= 2018 AVC Cup for Women squads =

This article shows the women's squads of the participating teams at the 2018 Asian Women's Volleyball Cup.

== Australia ==
- Head Coach: Shannon Winzer

The following is the Australian roster from Asianvolleyball

No.	Name	Date of birth	Height	Weight	Spike	Block	2017–18 club
1	Jennifer Tait	4 January 1995	1.91 m (6 ft 3 in)	80 kg (180 lb)	306 cm (10 ft 0 in)	291 cm (9 ft 7 in)	(Germany) VC Tyrol
3	Mikaela Stevens	11 July 1998	1.79 m (5 ft 10 in)	65 kg (143 lb)	290 cm (9 ft 6 in)	283 cm (9 ft 3 in)	(Australia) Centre Of Excellence
6	Alice De Innocentiis	4 June 1984	1.68 m (5 ft 6 in)	66 kg (146 lb)	268 cm (8 ft 10 in)	247 cm (8 ft 1 in)	(Australia) UTSSU
7	Kelly Lean	19 July 1995	1.75 m (5 ft 9 in)	70 kg (150 lb)	281 cm (9 ft 3 in)	269 cm (8 ft 10 in)	(United States) University of Tennessee Martin
9	Jaimee-Lee Morrow	16 November 1992	1.82 m (6 ft 0 in)	77 kg (170 lb)	290 cm (9 ft 6 in)	260 cm (8 ft 6 in)	(Netherlands) Springendal Set-up '65
11	Jennifer Sadler	18 March 1993	1.85 m (6 ft 1 in)	69 kg (152 lb)	302 cm (9 ft 11 in)	291 cm (9 ft 7 in)	(Austria) Asko Linz-Steg
13	Beth Carey (c)	28 September 1990	1.90 m (6 ft 3 in)	78 kg (172 lb)	300 cm (9 ft 10 in)	290 cm (9 ft 6 in)	(Philippines) Cignal HD Spikers
14	Rebecca Reeve	23 May 1994	1.79 m (5 ft 10 in)	69 kg (152 lb)	294 cm (9 ft 8 in)	283 cm (9 ft 3 in)	(United States) University of Tulsa
15	Monique Stojanovic	27 April 1992	1.86 m (6 ft 1 in)	72 kg (159 lb)	298 cm (9 ft 9 in)	290 cm (9 ft 6 in)	(Romania) CSM-Lugoj Volei
16	Agnieszka Kudziela	26 March 1996	1.88 m (6 ft 2 in)	70 kg (150 lb)	299 cm (9 ft 10 in)	288 cm (9 ft 5 in)	(Australia) Centre Of Excellence
20	Elissa Blowes	19 August 1992	1.80 m (5 ft 11 in)	73 kg (161 lb)	289 cm (9 ft 6 in)	281 cm (9 ft 3 in)	(Australia) Centre Of Excellence
22	Rachel Rourke	1 October 1988	1.92 m (6 ft 4 in)	85 kg (187 lb)	314 cm (10 ft 4 in)	301 cm (9 ft 11 in)	(China) Sichuan

== China ==
- Head Coach: Shi Hairong

The following is the Chinese roster from Asianvolleyball

No.	Name	Date of birth	Height	Weight	Spike	Block	2017–18 club
1	Yang Zhou	21 April 1992	1.89 m (6 ft 2 in)	80 kg (180 lb)	309 cm (10 ft 2 in)	298 cm (9 ft 9 in)	(China) Zhejiang
2	Che Wenhan	11 April 2000	1.93 m (6 ft 4 in)	67 kg (148 lb)	311 cm (10 ft 2 in)	300 cm (9 ft 10 in)	(China) Shandong
3	Ren Kaiyi	14 December 1991	1.82 m (6 ft 0 in)	74 kg (163 lb)	312 cm (10 ft 3 in)	301 cm (9 ft 11 in)	(China) Beijing
5	Gao Yi	22 July 1998	1.94 m (6 ft 4 in)	71 kg (157 lb)	322 cm (10 ft 7 in)	313 cm (10 ft 3 in)	(China) Bayi
6	Sun Haiping	23 May 1996	1.80 m (5 ft 11 in)	66 kg (146 lb)	300 cm (9 ft 10 in)	289 cm (9 ft 6 in)	(China) Liaoning
7	Chen Xintong	8 April 1994	1.80 m (5 ft 11 in)	65 kg (143 lb)	301 cm (9 ft 11 in)	290 cm (9 ft 6 in)	(China) Tianjin
8	Chen Peiyan	16 September 1999	1.94 m (6 ft 4 in)	83 kg (183 lb)	320 cm (10 ft 6 in)	310 cm (10 ft 2 in)	(China) Guangdong
9	Gong Meizi	17 July 1995	1.77 m (5 ft 10 in)	75 kg (165 lb)	295 cm (9 ft 8 in)	285 cm (9 ft 4 in)	(China) Liaoning
10	Zheng Yixin	6 May 1995	1.87 m (6 ft 2 in)	70 kg (150 lb)	308 cm (10 ft 1 in)	300 cm (9 ft 10 in)	(China) Fujian
12	Wang Meiyi	20 June 1995	1.75 m (5 ft 9 in)	75 kg (165 lb)	294 cm (9 ft 8 in)	285 cm (9 ft 4 in)	(China) Shanghai
19	Liu Yanhan	19 January 1993	1.88 m (6 ft 2 in)	82 kg (181 lb)	318 cm (10 ft 5 in)	309 cm (10 ft 2 in)	(China) Bayi
20	Duan Fang	26 December 1994	1.87 m (6 ft 2 in)	72 kg (159 lb)	317 cm (10 ft 5 in)	309 cm (10 ft 2 in)	(China) Liaoning
21	Zhang Yichan (c)	11 February 1991	1.89 m (6 ft 2 in)	78 kg (172 lb)	320 cm (10 ft 6 in)	311 cm (10 ft 2 in)	(China) Shanghai
25	Meng Zixuan	18 November 1996	1.80 m (5 ft 11 in)	63 kg (139 lb)	300 cm (9 ft 10 in)	289 cm (9 ft 6 in)	(China) Tianjin

== Iran ==
- Head Coach: Javad Mehregan

The following is the Iranian roster from Asianvolleyball

No.	Name	Date of birth	Height	Weight	Spike	Block	2017–18 club
2	Elham Fallah	14 April 1994	1.72 m (5 ft 8 in)	68 kg (150 lb)	270 cm (8 ft 10 in)	260 cm (8 ft 6 in)	
4	Soudabeh Bagherpour	16 September 1990	1.84 m (6 ft 0 in)	74 kg (163 lb)	294 cm (9 ft 8 in)	285 cm (9 ft 4 in)	
6	Shabnam Alikhani	25 September 1992	1.70 m (5 ft 7 in)	65 kg (143 lb)	270 cm (8 ft 10 in)	260 cm (8 ft 6 in)	
7	Fatemeh Hassani Sadi	12 November 1994	1.80 m (5 ft 11 in)	70 kg (150 lb)	296 cm (9 ft 9 in)	285 cm (9 ft 4 in)	
8	Mahsa Saberi	14 February 1993	1.75 m (5 ft 9 in)	70 kg (150 lb)	290 cm (9 ft 6 in)	280 cm (9 ft 2 in)	
9	Neda Chamlanian	3 July 1994	1.80 m (5 ft 11 in)	70 kg (150 lb)	292 cm (9 ft 7 in)	285 cm (9 ft 4 in)	
10	Maedeh Borhani Esfahani (c)	22 June 1988	1.79 m (5 ft 10 in)	70 kg (150 lb)	299 cm (9 ft 10 in)	285 cm (9 ft 4 in)	
11	Mahsa Kadkhoda	22 June 1993	1.79 m (5 ft 10 in)	65 kg (143 lb)	299 cm (9 ft 10 in)	290 cm (9 ft 6 in)	
13	Negar Kiani	6 August 1992	1.68 m (5 ft 6 in)	60 kg (130 lb)	260 cm (8 ft 6 in)	250 cm (8 ft 2 in)	
14	Farzaneh Moradian Ganjeh	6 June 1992	1.70 m (5 ft 7 in)	57 kg (126 lb)	260 cm (8 ft 6 in)	250 cm (8 ft 2 in)	
16	Tahmineh Dargazani	26 March 1996	1.82 m (6 ft 0 in)	61 kg (134 lb)	295 cm (9 ft 8 in)	290 cm (9 ft 6 in)	
17	Shekoufeh Safari	3 July 1989	1.87 m (6 ft 2 in)	75 kg (165 lb)	290 cm (9 ft 6 in)	280 cm (9 ft 2 in)	
19	Mona Ashofteh	1 February 2001	1.85 m (6 ft 1 in)	66 kg (146 lb)	298 cm (9 ft 9 in)	288 cm (9 ft 5 in)	
21	Mona Deris Mahmoudi	21 April 1993	1.88 m (6 ft 2 in)	90 kg (200 lb)	295 cm (9 ft 8 in)	285 cm (9 ft 4 in)	

== Japan ==
- Head Coach: Kiyoshi Abo

The following is the Japanese roster from Asianvolleyball

No.	Name	Date of birth	Height	Weight	Spike	Block	2017–18 club
1	Miwako Osanai	19 July 1997	1.73 m (5 ft 8 in)	66 kg (146 lb)	293 cm (9 ft 7 in)	270 cm (8 ft 10 in)	(Japan) Hitachi Rivale
2	Rei Kudo	5 December 1997	1.75 m (5 ft 9 in)	65 kg (143 lb)	300 cm (9 ft 10 in)	290 cm (9 ft 6 in)	(Japan) Denso Airybees
3	Moeri Hanai	17 April 1997	1.67 m (5 ft 6 in)	60 kg (130 lb)	275 cm (9 ft 0 in)	270 cm (8 ft 10 in)	(Japan) Nippon Sport Science University
4	Shuri Yamaguchi	2 September 1998	1.75 m (5 ft 9 in)	69 kg (152 lb)	292 cm (9 ft 7 in)	280 cm (9 ft 2 in)	(Japan) Ageo Medics
5	Shiori Aratani (c)	22 September 1998	1.73 m (5 ft 8 in)	61 kg (134 lb)	298 cm (9 ft 9 in)	275 cm (9 ft 0 in)	(Japan) NEC Red Rockets
6	Miyuki Horie	12 October 1998	1.73 m (5 ft 8 in)	62 kg (137 lb)	295 cm (9 ft 8 in)	280 cm (9 ft 2 in)	(Japan) Ageo Medics
7	Kotona Hayashi	13 November 1999	1.73 m (5 ft 8 in)	60 kg (130 lb)	295 cm (9 ft 8 in)	275 cm (9 ft 0 in)	(Japan) JT Marvelous
8	Miyu Nakagawa	8 January 2000	1.83 m (6 ft 0 in)	62 kg (137 lb)	300 cm (9 ft 10 in)	290 cm (9 ft 6 in)	(Japan) Hisamitsu Springs
9	Nichika Yamada	24 February 2000	1.83 m (6 ft 0 in)	70 kg (150 lb)	300 cm (9 ft 10 in)	290 cm (9 ft 6 in)	(Japan) NEC Red Rockets
10	Sayaka Yokota	30 September 1999	1.78 m (5 ft 10 in)	70 kg (150 lb)	298 cm (9 ft 9 in)	275 cm (9 ft 0 in)	(Japan) Tokai University
11	Rena Mizusugi	6 April 2000	1.63 m (5 ft 4 in)	47 kg (104 lb)	265 cm (8 ft 8 in)	255 cm (8 ft 4 in)	(Japan) Kinrankai High School
12	Hitomi Shiode	15 September 1999	1.75 m (5 ft 9 in)	65 kg (143 lb)	285 cm (9 ft 4 in)	270 cm (8 ft 10 in)	(Japan) Nippon Sport Science University
13	Mai Irisawa	2 June 1999	1.89 m (6 ft 2 in)	68 kg (150 lb)	309 cm (10 ft 2 in)	300 cm (9 ft 10 in)	(Japan) Hitachi Rivale
16	Minami Yasuda	12 December 2001	1.77 m (5 ft 10 in)	65 kg (143 lb)	285 cm (9 ft 4 in)	275 cm (9 ft 0 in)	(Japan) Okazaki Gakuen High School

== Kazakhstan ==
Head coach: Shapran Vyacheslav

No.	Name	Date of birth	Height	Weight	Spike	Block	2017–18 club
1	Tatyana Fendrikova (L)	23 February 1990	1.69 m (5 ft 7 in)	55 kg (121 lb)	280 cm (110 in)	275 cm (108 in)	(Kazakhstan) Almaty VC
2	Lyudmila Issayeva	26 September 1989	1.84 m (6 ft 0 in)	70 kg (150 lb)	295 cm (116 in)	280 cm (110 in)	(Kazakhstan) Zhetyssu VC
3	Sana Anarkulova	21 July 1989	1.89 m (6 ft 2 in)	74 kg (163 lb)	305 cm (120 in)	280 cm (110 in)	(Kazakhstan) Altay VC
4	Yekaterina Zhdanova	28 May 1992	1.83 m (6 ft 0 in)	65 kg (143 lb)	280 cm (110 in)	270 cm (110 in)	(Kazakhstan) Zhetyssu VC
5	Marina Storozhenko (L)	6 June 1985	1.75 m (5 ft 9 in)	57 kg (126 lb)	285 cm (112 in)	275 cm (108 in)	(Kazakhstan) Zhetyssu VC
6	Natalya Akilova	31 May 1993	1.83 m (6 ft 0 in)	62 kg (137 lb)	295 cm (116 in)	275 cm (108 in)	(Kazakhstan) Zhetyssu VC
7	Inna Yakovleva	4 March 1988	1.77 m (5 ft 10 in)	65 kg (143 lb)	208 cm (82 in)	217 cm (85 in)	(Kazakhstan) Zhetyssu VC
9	Olga Drobyshevskaya	22 September 1985	1.85 m (6 ft 1 in)	71 kg (157 lb)	305 cm (120 in)	275 cm (108 in)	(Kazakhstan) Altay VC
11	Katerina Tatko	15 December 1992	1.82 m (6 ft 0 in)	70 kg (150 lb)	285 cm (112 in)	275 cm (108 in)	(Kazakhstan) Zhetyssu VC
13	Radmila Beresneva (c)	6 June 1983	1.85 m (6 ft 1 in)	70 kg (150 lb)	300 cm (120 in)	295 cm (116 in)	(Kazakhstan) Altay VC
14	Alessya Safronova	10 February 1986	1.92 m (6 ft 4 in)	70 kg (150 lb)	290 cm (110 in)	280 cm (110 in)	(Kazakhstan) Ihtisas
15	Aliya Batkuldina	18 November 1995	1.81 m (5 ft 11 in)	74 kg (163 lb)	273 cm (107 in)	264 cm (104 in)	(Kazakhstan) Zhetyssu VC
17	Alla Bogdashkina	22 August 1985	1.85 m (6 ft 1 in)	65 kg (143 lb)	275 cm (108 in)	270 cm (110 in)	(Kazakhstan) Irtysh-Kazchrome
18	Kristina Anikonova	5 January 1991	1.83 m (6 ft 0 in)	73 kg (161 lb)	295 cm (116 in)	285 cm (112 in)	(Kazakhstan) Altay VC

== South Korea ==
- Head Coach: Lee Kyung-suk

The following is the South Korean roster from Asianvolleyball

No.	Name	Date of birth	Height	Weight	Spike	Block	2017–18 club
1	Ha Hye-jin	7 September 1996	1.80 m (5 ft 11 in)	61 kg (134 lb)	286 cm (9 ft 5 in)	265 cm (8 ft 8 in)	(South Korea) Gimcheon
2	Na Hyun-soo	15 September 1999	1.83 m (6 ft 0 in)	61 kg (134 lb)	285 cm (9 ft 4 in)	267 cm (8 ft 9 in)	(South Korea) Daejeon Yongsan High School
3	An Hye-jin	16 February 1998	1.75 m (5 ft 9 in)	65 kg (143 lb)	279 cm (9 ft 2 in)	254 cm (8 ft 4 in)	(South Korea) Seoul
5	Jeong Ji-yun	1 January 2001	1.79 m (5 ft 10 in)	68 kg (150 lb)	250 cm (8 ft 2 in)	240 cm (7 ft 10 in)	(South Korea) Gyeongnam Girls'High School
6	Kim Chae-yeon	11 December 1999	1.83 m (6 ft 0 in)	70 kg (150 lb)	290 cm (9 ft 6 in)	279 cm (9 ft 2 in)	(South Korea) Incheon
7	Go Ye-rim	12 June 1994	1.77 m (5 ft 10 in)	62 kg (137 lb)	293 cm (9 ft 7 in)	283 cm (9 ft 3 in)	(South Korea) Hwaseong
8	Kim Yeon-gyeon	1 December 1993	1.63 m (5 ft 4 in)	54 kg (119 lb)	265 cm (8 ft 8 in)	265 cm (8 ft 8 in)	(South Korea) Suwon
11	Ji Min-kyeong	16 March 1998	1.84 m (6 ft 0 in)	73 kg (161 lb)	283 cm (9 ft 3 in)	270 cm (8 ft 10 in)	(South Korea) Daejeon
13	Han Soo-ji (c)	1 February 1989	1.82 m (6 ft 0 in)	78 kg (172 lb)	305 cm (10 ft 0 in)	296 cm (9 ft 9 in)	(South Korea) Daejeon
14	Park Hye-min	8 November 2000	1.81 m (5 ft 11 in)	64 kg (141 lb)	288 cm (9 ft 5 in)	275 cm (9 ft 0 in)	(South Korea) Sunmyeng Girls' High School
15	Hwang Min-kyoung	1 June 1990	1.74 m (5 ft 9 in)	63 kg (139 lb)	275 cm (9 ft 0 in)	265 cm (8 ft 8 in)	(South Korea) Suwon
19	Lee So-lah	11 August 1998	1.74 m (5 ft 9 in)	58 kg (128 lb)	285 cm (9 ft 4 in)	280 cm (9 ft 2 in)	(South Korea) Daejeon

== Philippines ==
- Head Coach: Cesael Delos Santos

The following is the Philippine roster from Asianvolleyball

No.	Name	Date of birth	Height	Weight	Spike	Block	2017–18 club
2	Alyssa Valdez	29 June 1993	1.72 m (5 ft 8 in)	59 kg (130 lb)	282 cm (9 ft 3 in)	276 cm (9 ft 1 in)	(Philippines) Creamline
3	Mika Aereen Reyes	21 June 1994	1.81 m (5 ft 11 in)	66 kg (146 lb)	284 cm (9 ft 4 in)	278 cm (9 ft 1 in)	(Philippines) Petron Blaze
4	Jasmine Nabor	11 July 1998	1.70 m (5 ft 7 in)	55 kg (121 lb)	278 cm (9 ft 1 in)	272 cm (8 ft 11 in)	(Philippines) PayMaya
5	Risa Sato	4 October 1994	1.77 m (5 ft 10 in)	65 kg (143 lb)	275 cm (9 ft 0 in)	269 cm (8 ft 10 in)	(Philippines) Creamline
7	Mylene Paat	4 May 1994	1.80 m (5 ft 11 in)	68 kg (150 lb)	288 cm (9 ft 5 in)	282 cm (9 ft 3 in)	(Philippines) Cignal
8	Aiza Maizo-Pontillas	29 February 1988	1.75 m (5 ft 9 in)	69 kg (152 lb)	280 cm (9 ft 2 in)	275 cm (9 ft 0 in)	(Philippines) Petron Blaze
10	Maika Angela Ortiz	30 August 1991	1.80 m (5 ft 11 in)	73 kg (161 lb)	284 cm (9 ft 4 in)	278 cm (9 ft 1 in)	(Philippines) Foton Tornadoes
11	Charleen Abigaile Cruz	5 November 1988	1.71 m (5 ft 7 in)	62 kg (137 lb)	281 cm (9 ft 3 in)	274 cm (9 ft 0 in)	(Philippines) Foton Tornadoes
12	Julia Melissa Morado	5 October 1995	1.70 m (5 ft 7 in)	60 kg (130 lb)	278 cm (9 ft 1 in)	272 cm (8 ft 11 in)	(Philippines) Creamline
13	Denden Lazaro	21 January 1992	1.61 m (5 ft 3 in)	54 kg (119 lb)	251 cm (8 ft 3 in)	247 cm (8 ft 1 in)	(Philippines) Cocolife
15	Jessica Margarett Galanza	28 November 1996	1.70 m (5 ft 7 in)	55 kg (121 lb)	281 cm (9 ft 3 in)	274 cm (9 ft 0 in)	(Philippines) Creamline
18	Abigail Maraño (c)	22 December 1992	1.78 m (5 ft 10 in)	65 kg (143 lb)	282 cm (9 ft 3 in)	276 cm (9 ft 1 in)	(Philippines) F2 Logistics
20	Grethcel Soltones	9 September 1995	1.73 m (5 ft 8 in)	68 kg (150 lb)	275 cm (9 ft 0 in)	276 cm (9 ft 1 in)	(Philippines) PayMaya
22	Melissa Gohing	22 October 1991	1.60 m (5 ft 3 in)	58 kg (128 lb)	249 cm (8 ft 2 in)	246 cm (8 ft 1 in)	(Philippines) Creamline

== Chinese Taipei ==
Head Coach: Lin Min-hui

No.	Name	Date of birth	Height	Weight	Spike	Block	2017–18 club
1	Lin Shu-ho	6 February 1999	1.67 m (5 ft 6 in)	62 kg (137 lb)	272 cm (107 in)	262 cm (103 in)	(Chinese Taipei) Taiwan Power
2	Hsiao Hsiang-ling	2 January 1993	1.70 m (5 ft 7 in)	69 kg (152 lb)	260 cm (100 in)	248 cm (98 in)	(Chinese Taipei) Taiwan Power
5	Chen Yi-ju	21 December 1989	1.73 m (5 ft 8 in)	68 kg (150 lb)	277 cm (109 in)	275 cm (108 in)	(Chinese Taipei) CMFC
6	Hsieh Yi-chen	25 September 1990	1.65 m (5 ft 5 in)	58 kg (128 lb)	280 cm (110 in)	275 cm (108 in)	(Chinese Taipei) Taipei University
7	Tseng Wan-ling	13 May 1996	1.71 m (5 ft 7 in)	66 kg (146 lb)	290 cm (110 in)	277 cm (109 in)	(Chinese Taipei) Taiwan Power
9	Chang Li-yun	28 February 1991	1.80 m (5 ft 11 in)	66 kg (146 lb)	288 cm (113 in)	276 cm (109 in)	(Chinese Taipei) Taiwan Power
11	Chen Wan-ting (c)	25 November 1990	1.78 m (5 ft 10 in)	65 kg (143 lb)	280 cm (110 in)	290 cm (110 in)	(Chinese Taipei) Taiwan Power
12	Yang Meng-hua	15 August 1991	1.70 m (5 ft 7 in)	67 kg (148 lb)	270 cm (110 in)	262 cm (103 in)	(Chinese Taipei) CMFC
15	Lee Tzu-ying	4 July 1994	1.74 m (5 ft 9 in)	71 kg (157 lb)	274 cm (108 in)	265 cm (104 in)	(Chinese Taipei) Taiwan Power
16	Chen Tzu-ya	26 August 1997	1.78 m (5 ft 10 in)	61 kg (134 lb)	272 cm (107 in)	271 cm (107 in)	(Chinese Taipei) Taiwan Power
18	Huang Hsin-yu	25 February 1998	1.79 m (5 ft 10 in)	63 kg (139 lb)	289 cm (114 in)	279 cm (110 in)	(Chinese Taipei) Taiwan Power
19	Wu Wei-hua	5 February 1994	1.73 m (5 ft 8 in)	73 kg (161 lb)	278 cm (109 in)	267 cm (105 in)	(Chinese Taipei) New Tapei National University

== Thailand ==
- Head Coach: Danai Sriwatcharamethakul

The following is the Thai roster from Thailand Volleyball Association

No.	Name	Date of birth	Height	Weight	Spike	Block	2017–18 club
2	Piyanut Pannoy	10 November 1989	1.72 m (5 ft 8 in)	62 kg (137 lb)	280 cm (9 ft 2 in)	275 cm (9 ft 0 in)	(Thailand) Chonburi
3	Pornpun Guedpard	5 May 1993	1.72 m (5 ft 8 in)	63 kg (139 lb)	288 cm (9 ft 5 in)	279 cm (9 ft 2 in)	(Thailand) Bangkok
4	Thatdao Nuekjang	3 February 1994	1.85 m (6 ft 1 in)	72 kg (159 lb)	308 cm (10 ft 1 in)	296 cm (9 ft 9 in)	(Thailand) Khonkaen Star
5	Pleumjit Thinkaow (c)	9 November 1983	1.80 m (5 ft 11 in)	67 kg (148 lb)	303 cm (9 ft 11 in)	283 cm (9 ft 3 in)	(Thailand) Bangkok
6	Onuma Sittirak	13 June 1986	1.75 m (5 ft 9 in)	72 kg (159 lb)	304 cm (10 ft 0 in)	285 cm (9 ft 4 in)	(Thailand) Nakhon Ratchasima
7	Hattaya Bamrungsuk	12 August 1993	1.80 m (5 ft 11 in)	71 kg (157 lb)	292 cm (9 ft 7 in)	282 cm (9 ft 3 in)	(Thailand) Nakhon Ratchasima
8	Watchareeya Nualjam	22 July 1996	1.77 m (5 ft 10 in)	64 kg (141 lb)	292 cm (9 ft 7 in)	279 cm (9 ft 2 in)	(Thailand) Chonburi
10	Wilavan Apinyapong	6 June 1984	1.74 m (5 ft 9 in)	70 kg (150 lb)	294 cm (9 ft 8 in)	282 cm (9 ft 3 in)	(Thailand) Chonburi
13	Nootsara Tomkom	7 July 1985	1.69 m (5 ft 7 in)	57 kg (126 lb)	289 cm (9 ft 6 in)	278 cm (9 ft 1 in)	(Turkey) Fenerbahçe
15	Malika Kanthong	8 January 1987	1.78 m (5 ft 10 in)	65 kg (143 lb)	292 cm (9 ft 7 in)	278 cm (9 ft 1 in)	(Thailand) Chonburi
16	Pimpichaya Kokram	16 June 1998	1.78 m (5 ft 10 in)	62 kg (137 lb)	293 cm (9 ft 7 in)	283 cm (9 ft 3 in)	(Thailand) Nonthaburi
18	Ajcharaporn Kongyot	18 June 1995	1.78 m (5 ft 10 in)	65 kg (143 lb)	298 cm (9 ft 9 in)	287 cm (9 ft 5 in)	(Thailand) Chonburi
20	Supattra Pairoj	27 June 1990	1.60 m (5 ft 3 in)	58 kg (128 lb)	275 cm (9 ft 0 in)	265 cm (8 ft 8 in)	(Thailand) Chonburi
24	Thanacha Sooksod	26 May 2000	1.80 m (5 ft 11 in)	70 kg (150 lb)	283 cm (9 ft 3 in)	275 cm (9 ft 0 in)	(Thailand) Chonburi

== Vietnam ==
- Head coach: (Vietnam) Nguyễn Tuấn Kiệt
- Assistant coaches:
  - (Vietnam) Lê Thị Hiền
  - (Vietnam) Trịnh Nguyễn Hoàng Huy

No.	Pos	Name	Date of Birth (age)	Height	Weight	Spike	Block	2018 club
1	OH	Dương Thị Hên	August 15, 1998 (age 28)	1.74 m (5 ft 9 in)	56 kg (123 lb)	303 cm (119 in)	294 cm (116 in)	(Vietnam) VTV Bình Điền Long An
2	OP	Đặng Thị Kim Thanh	March 28, 1999 (age 27)	1.78 m (5 ft 10 in)	64 kg (141 lb)	300 cm (120 in)	295 cm (116 in)	(Vietnam) VTV Bình Điền Long An
3	OH	Trần Thị Thanh Thuý	November 12, 1997 (age 28)	1.93 m (6 ft 4 in)	67 kg (148 lb)	320 cm (130 in)	310 cm (120 in)	(Vietnam) VTV Bình Điền Long An
5	L	Lê Thị Thanh Liên	April 7, 1993 (age 33)	1.60 m (5 ft 3 in)	54 kg (119 lb)	275 cm (108 in)	265 cm (104 in)	(Vietnam) Đức Giang Hà Nội VC
6	MB	Đinh Thị Trà Giang (captain)	June 26, 1992 (age 34)	1.82 m (6 ft 0 in)	69 kg (152 lb)	305 cm (120 in)	297 cm (117 in)	(Vietnam) Kinh Bắc VC
8	L	Nguyễn Thị Kim Liên	February 10, 1993 (age 33)	1.58 m (5 ft 2 in)	53 kg (117 lb)	271 cm (107 in)	263 cm (104 in)	(Vietnam) VTV Bình Điền Long An
10	S	Nguyễn Linh Chi	July 31, 1990 (age 36)	1.73 m (5 ft 8 in)	65 kg (143 lb)	295 cm (116 in)	288 cm (113 in)	(Vietnam) Thông tin LVPB
14	OH	Đinh Thị Thúy	April 12, 1998 (age 28)	1.75 m (5 ft 9 in)	64 kg (141 lb)	307 cm (121 in)	298 cm (117 in)	(Vietnam) Vietinbank VC
15	MB	Nguyễn Thị Trinh	May 9, 1997 (age 29)	1.81 m (5 ft 11 in)	61 kg (134 lb)	306 cm (120 in)	296 cm (117 in)	(Vietnam) Đắk Lắk VC
16	MB	Bùi Thị Ngà	August 15, 1994 (age 32)	1.87 m (6 ft 2 in)	74 kg (163 lb)	310 cm (120 in)	302 cm (119 in)	(Vietnam) Thông tin LVPB
17	MB	Lê Thanh Thúy	May 23, 1995 (age 31)	1.80 m (5 ft 11 in)	62 kg (137 lb)	305 cm (120 in)	300 cm (120 in)	(Vietnam) Vietinbank VC
18	MB	Lưu Thị Huệ	January 2, 1999 (age 27)	1.85 m (6 ft 1 in)	59 kg (130 lb)	312 cm (123 in)	306 cm (120 in)	(Vietnam) Vietinbank VC
20	S	Nguyễn Thu Hoài	September 16, 1998 (age 28)	1.74 m (5 ft 9 in)	60 kg (130 lb)	298 cm (117 in)	293 cm (115 in)	(Vietnam) Vietinbank VC

Notes:

- ^{OH} Outside Hitter
- ^{OP} Opposite Spiker
- ^{S} Setter
- ^{MB} Middle Blocker
- ^{L} Libero
