= 2024–25 SV.League Women's =

Japanese volleyball league

2024-25 SV.League Women's
- Sport: Volleyball
- Duration: October 12, 2024 - May 4, 2025
- Teams: 14
- League champions: Osaka Marvelous
- Runners-up: NEC Red Rockets

Seasons
- 2025-26

The Volleyball 2024–25 SV.League Women's is the first tournament of the newly established SV.League which scheduled from October 12, 2024, to May 4, 2025.

Osaka Marvelous beat NEC Red Rockets Kawasaki with straight set in final match to became the first champions of the league.

== Clubs ==
2024–25 SV.League Women's
Club	Head Coach	Captain	City, Prefecture	Colors	Affiliation
Aranmare Yamagata	(Japan) Tsutomu Kitahara	(Japan) Yuri Kimura	Sakata, Yamagata		Prestige International
Denso Airybees	(Japan) Takeshi Tsuji	(Japan) Haruna Kawabata	Koriyama, Fukushima; Nishio, Aichi		Denso
Astemo Rivale Ibaraki	(Japan) Nakaya Kodai	(Japan) Ruriko Uesaka	Hitachinaka, Ibaraki		Hitachi
Gunma Green Wings	(Japan) Mayumi Saito	(Japan) Minami Matsuura	Maebashi, Gunma		Gunma Bank
Saitama Ageo Medics	(Japan) Shigekazu Okubo	(Japan) Yuuka Sato	Ageo, Saitama		Ageo Medical Group
NEC Red Rockets Kawasaki	(Japan) Takayuki Kaneko	(Japan) Yuka Sawada	Kawasaki, Kanagawa		NEC
Kurobe AquaFairies	(Japan) Gen Kawakita	(Japan) Anri Nakamura	Kurobe, Toyama		Kurobe City Athletic Association
PFU BlueCats Ishikawa Kahoku	(Japan) Baba Daitaku	(Japan) Aya Hosonuma	Kahoku, Ishikawa		PFU Limited
Queenseis Kariya	(Japan) Hiro Takahashi	(Japan) Hinata Shigihara	Kariya, Aichi		Toyota Auto Body
Toray Arrows Shiga	(Japan) Akira Koshiya	(Japan) Tsugumi Fukazawa	Ōtsu, Shiga		Toray Industries
Osaka Marvelous	(Japan) Daisuke Sakai	(Japan) Mizuki Tanaka	Osaka		Japan Tobacco Ltd.
Victorina Himeji	(Netherlands) Avital Selinger	(Japan) Mika Shibata	Himeji, Hyōgo		Himeji Victorina Co., Ltd.
Okayama Seagulls	(Japan) Akiyoshi Kawamoto	(Japan) Mizuki Ugajin	Okayama		Okayama Seagulls Co., Ltd.
Saga Hisamitsu Springs	(Japan) Shingo Sakai	(Japan) Erika Sakae	Tosu, Saga		Hisamitsu Pharmaceutical

== Transfer Players ==
2024–25 SV.League Women's Inbound Transfers
Player	Coming from	Coming to	Ref.
(Ukraine) Oleksandra Bytsenko	(China) Shenzhen Zhongsai	(Japan) Aranmare Yamagata	
(Thailand) Donphon Sinpho	(Thailand) Nakhon Ratchasima QminC VC	(Japan) Aranmare Yamagata	
(Japan) Mao Ogawa	(Japan) Niigata University of Health and Welfare	(Japan) Aranmare Yamagata	
(Japan) Maho Tanaka	(Japan) Kobe Shinwa University	(Japan) Aranmare Yamagata	
(Japan) Yuka Yoshimura	(Japan) Juntendo University	(Japan) Aranmare Yamagata	
(Japan) Yuki Yamagami	(Japan) Queenseis Kariya	(Japan) Denso Airybees	
(Japan) Kyoka Seto	(Japan) PFU BlueCats Ishikawa Kahoku	(Japan) Denso Airybees	
(Japan) Kotomi Osaki	(Japan) Toray Arrows Shiga	(Japan) Denso Airybees	
(Japan) Hitomi Fukumoto	(Japan) Kurobe AquaFairies	(Japan) Denso Airybees	
(Colombia) Amanda Coneo	(Poland) KS DevelopRes Rzeszow	(Japan) Denso Airybees	
(Japan) Reina Tokoku	(South Korea) Heungkuk Life Pink Spiders	(Japan) Denso Airybees	
(Japan) Chika Yanagi	(Japan) Shimokitazawa Seitoku High School	(Japan) Denso Airybees	
(Japan) Yee Mon Myat	(Japan) Shimokitazawa Seitoku High School	(Japan) Denso Airybees	
(Japan) Yusa Kawagishi	(Japan) Kyoto Tachibana High School	(Japan) Denso Airybees	
(Japan) Reika Sato	(Japan) Kurobe AquaFairies	(Japan) Astemo Rivale Ibaraki	
(United States) Brionne Butler	(Brazil) Osasco São Cristóvão Saúde	(Japan) Astemo Rivale Ibaraki	
(United States) Mackenzie May	(Poland) PGE Grot Budowlani Łódź	(Japan) Astemo Rivale Ibaraki	
(Japan) Mion Hirose	(Japan) NSSU	(Japan) Astemo Rivale Ibaraki	
(Japan) Kaera Chuganji	(Japan) Higashi Kyushu Ryukoku High School	(Japan) Astemo Rivale Ibaraki	
(Japan) Niji Sato	(Japan) Koriyama Joshidai High School	(Japan) Astemo Rivale Ibaraki	
(Japan) Minami Takaso	(Japan) PFU BlueCats Ishikawa Kahoku	(Japan) Gunma Green Wings	
(Japan) Aoba Shiozaki	(Japan) JA Gifu Rioreina	(Japan) Gunma Green Wings	
(Japan) Hinaru Koide	(Japan) Queenseis Kariya	(Japan) Gunma Green Wings	
(Thailand) Chitaporn Kamlangmak	(Japan) Toray Arrows Shiga	(Japan) Gunma Green Wings	
(Moldova) Aliona Martiniuc	(Romania) CSM Lugoj	(Japan) Gunma Green Wings	
(Poland) Natalia Lijewska	(Poland) UNI Opole	(Japan) Gunma Green Wings	
(Japan) Mizuki Arai	(Japan) Kokushikan University	(Japan) Gunma Green Wings	
(Japan) Otomo Moka	(Japan) Kokushikan University	(Japan) Gunma Green Wings	
(Japan) Riko Sato	(Japan) Juntendo University	(Japan) Gunma Green Wings	
(Japan) Yasuha Nakano	(Japan) NSSU	(Japan) Gunma Green Wings	
(Japan) Koto Monta	(Japan) University of Tsukuba	(Japan) Gunma Green Wings	
(Slovenia) Nika Markovič	(Romania) Rapid București	(Japan) Saitama Ageo Medics	
(Japan) Asuka Hamamatsu	(Japan) Saga Hisamitsu Springs	(Japan) Saitama Ageo Medics	
(Japan) Nanami Inoue	(Japan) Toray Arrows Shiga	(Japan) Saitama Ageo Medics	
(Japan) Sora Ishiro	(Japan) Osaka International University	(Japan) Saitama Ageo Medics	
(Japan) Mei Koyama	(Japan) Shimokitazawa Seitoku High School	(Japan) Saitama Ageo Medics	
(Brazil) Lorrayna Marys	(Italy) Volley Bergamo	(Japan) NEC Red Rockets Kawasaki	
(Japan) Yukiko Wada	(Japan) Osaka Marvelous	(Japan) NEC Red Rockets Kawasaki	
(Japan) Haruka Hosokawa	(Japan) Kaetsu University	(Japan) NEC Red Rockets Kawasaki	
(Japan) Misuzu Takahashi	(Japan) Aoyama Gakuin University	(Japan) NEC Red Rockets Kawasaki	
(Japan) Hasebe Naka	(Japan) Nihon University	(Japan) NEC Red Rockets Kawasaki	
(Japan) Natsumi Kodama	(Japan) Juntendo University	(Japan) NEC Red Rockets Kawasaki	
(Japan) Shion Nagasawa	(Japan) Artemis Hokkaido	(Japan) Kurobe AquaFairies	
(Japan) Rino Furuichi	(Japan) Victorina Himeji	(Japan) Kurobe AquaFairies	
(Japan) Rimi Kaneda	(Japan) Victorina Himeji	(Japan) Kurobe AquaFairies	
(Japan) Ayami Urayama	(Japan) Artemis Hokkaido	(Japan) Kurobe AquaFairies	
(Netherlands) Iris Scholten	(Italy) Itas Trentino	(Japan) Kurobe AquaFairies	
(Belgium) Lena Stigrot	(Italy) Cuneo Granda Volley	(Japan) Kurobe AquaFairies	
(Philippines) Madeleine Yrenea Madayag	(Philippines) Choco Mucho Flying Titans	(Japan) Kurobe AquaFairies	
(Japan) Kokoro Inada	Japan Women's College of Physical Education	(Japan) Kurobe AquaFairies	
(Japan) Aoi Hata	(Japan) Nihon University	(Japan) Kurobe AquaFairies	
(Japan) Ciara Hirano	(Japan) Kinrankai High School	(Japan) Kurobe AquaFairies	
(United States) Kashauna Williams	(Indonesia) Jakarta BIN	(Japan) PFU BlueCats Ishikawa Kahoku	
(Thailand) Thatdao Nuekjang	(Japan) Astemo Rivale Ibaraki	(Japan) PFU BlueCats Ishikawa Kahoku	
(Thailand) Natthanicha Jaisaen	(Vietnam) Than Quang Ninh	(Japan) PFU BlueCats Ishikawa Kahoku	
(Japan) Kaede Goto	(Japan) Chukyo University	(Japan) PFU BlueCats Ishikawa Kahoku	
(Japan) Lisa Lopez	(Japan) NSSU	(Japan) PFU BlueCats Ishikawa Kahoku	
(Japan) Sanae Yoshida	(Japan) J. F. Oberlin University	(Japan) PFU BlueCats Ishikawa Kahoku	
(Japan) Mami Yokota	(Japan) Denso Airybees	(Japan) Queenseis Kariya	
(Japan) Sayaka Yokota	(Japan) Denso Airybees	(Japan) Queenseis Kariya	
(Japan) Ayano Sato	(Japan) Kurobe AquaFairies	(Japan) Queenseis Kariya	
(Belgium) Kaja Grobelna	(Italy) Chieri '76 Volleyball	(Japan) Queenseis Kariya	
(Japan) Shiori Mitome	(Japan) Gifu Kyoritsu University	(Japan) Queenseis Kariya	
(Japan) Haruka Nakamura	(Japan) University of Tsukuba	(Japan) Queenseis Kariya	
(Japan) Kanami Tahiro	(Turkey) Galatasaray Daikin	(Japan) Toray Arrows Shiga	
(Japan) Kyoko Aoyagi	(Japan) Saitama Ageo Medics	(Japan) Toray Arrows Shiga	
(Japan) Karin Nojima	(Japan) Tokyo Sunbeams	(Japan) Toray Arrows Shiga	
(Japan) Tomo Yamashita	(Japan) Veertien Mie	(Japan) Toray Arrows Shiga	
(Japan) Aimi Okawa	(Japan) Queenseis Kariya	(Japan) Toray Arrows Shiga	
(Japan) Manami Koyama	(Japan) Osaka Marvelous	(Japan) Toray Arrows Shiga	
(Netherlands) Juliët Lohuis	(Italy) Volleyball Casalmaggiore	(Japan) Toray Arrows Shiga	
(Japan) Chisato Hanaoka	(Japan) Kinrankai High School	(Japan) Toray Arrows Shiga	
(Japan) Minami Kessoku	(Japan) Narashino High School	(Japan) Toray Arrows Shiga	
(Japan) Haruka Yamashita	(Japan) PFU BlueCats Ishikawa Kahoku	(Japan) Osaka Marvelous	
(Japan) Mikoto Shima	(Japan) PFU BlueCats Ishikawa Kahoku	(Japan) Osaka Marvelous	
(Belgium) Lise Van Hecke	(Japan) Queenseis Kariya	(Japan) Osaka Marvelous	
(Japan) Koyumi Fukumura	(Japan) Shujitsu High School	(Japan) Osaka Marvelous	
(Japan) Karen Moriki	(Japan) Breath Hamamatsu	(Japan) Victorina Himeji	
(Brazil) Ana Luiza Rudiger	(Brazil) Barueri Volleyball Club	(Japan) Victorina Himeji	
(Serbia) Minja Osmajić	(Serbia) Jedinstvo Stara Pazova	(Japan) Victorina Himeji	
(Japan) Miku Akimoto	(Japan) Kyoei Gakuen High School	(Japan) Victorina Himeji	
(Japan) Kokomi Kawamata	(Japan) Shimokitazawa Seitoku High School	(Japan) Victorina Himeji	
(Japan) Waka Yada	(Japan) Imabari Seika High School	(Japan) Victorina Himeji	
(Japan) Tomona Nozue	(Japan) Ryukoku University	(Japan) Victorina Himeji	
(Japan) Yuna Yamamoto	(Japan) J. F. Oberlin University	(Japan) Victorina Himeji	
(Japan) Tomoka Nagai	(Japan) Keiai University	(Japan) Okayama Seagulls	
(Japan) Ayaha Miyagawa	(Japan) Osaka International High School	(Japan) Okayama Seagulls	
(Japan) Kotoha Miyagawa	(Japan) Osaka International High School	(Japan) Okayama Seagulls	
(Japan) Miku Wada	(Japan) Fukuoka Kodai Jyoto High School	(Japan) Okayama Seagulls	
(Japan) Risa Kawabata	(Japan) Osaka International High School	(Japan) Okayama Seagulls	
(Japan) Aya Watanabe	(Japan) Astemo Rivale Ibaraki	(Japan) Saga Hisamitsu Springs	
(United States) Stephanie Samedy	(United States) Omaha Supernovas	(Japan) Saga Hisamitsu Springs	
(Hungary) Gréta Szakmáry	(Italy) Igor Gorgonzola Novara	(Japan) Saga Hisamitsu Springs	

== Schedule ==
=== Regular season ===
The season began on Saturday, October 12, 2024, and ended on Sunday, April 13, 2025.

1. Each club will play a total of 44 matches in a home-and-away format, with 22 of those matches being home games.
2. The top 8 clubs from the regular season will advance to the Championship.
3. The final standings for the clubs ranked 9th to 14th will be determined based on the results of the regular season.
4. All matches will be played as best-of-five sets.

=== Championship ===
Begins on April 18, 2025, and ends on May 3, 2025.

1. The Championship will be conducted in a tournament format.
2. The clubs ranked 1st to 8th in the regular season will play in the Quarterfinals based on their rankings at the end of the regular season.
3. The winners of the Quarterfinals will advance to the Semifinals, and the winners of the Semifinals will advance to the Final.
4. There will be no ranking matches for the clubs that lose in the Quarterfinals and Semifinals; the final rankings for the 3rd to 8th clubs will be determined based on the final regular season standings.
5. All matches, except for the Final, will be hosted by the higher-ranked club from the regular season.
6. All matches will be played as best-of-five sets.

== Season standing procedure ==
=== Regular season ===
Points awarded per match are as follows:

- 3 Points: Win with a set score of "3-0" or "3-1"
- 2 Points: Win with a set score of "3-2"
- 1 Point: Loss with a set score of "2-3"
- 0 Points: Loss with a set score of "0-3" or "1-3"

=== Championship ===
A best-of-three format will be used, with the team winning two out of three matches advancing.

If both teams have one win each, a third match will be played to determine the winner.

== Regular Round ==
Qualified for the Final

2024–25 SV.League Women's Regular Round Final Standing
Rank	Team	Match	Win	Loss	Point	Win Ratio	Win Set	Loss Set	Set Rates
1	Osaka Marvelous	44	37	7	112	0.84	112	42	2.90
2	NEC Red Rockets Kawasaki	44	30	14	92	0.68	110	66	1.67
3	Saga Hisamitsu Springs	44	30	14	89	0.68	105	64	1.64
4	Denso Airybees	44	29	15	89	0.66	107	67	1.60
5	Saitama Ageo Medics	44	27	17	83	0.61	95	69	1.38
6	Victorina Himeji	44	27	17	79	0.61	99	72	1.38
7	Toray Arrows Shiga	44	26	18	74	0.59	96	85	1.13
8	Astemo Rivale Ibaraki	44	23	21	65	0.52	83	83	1.00
9	Queenseis Kariya	44	20	24	62	0.45	81	92	0.88
10	PFU BlueCats Ishikawa Kahoku	44	19	25	57	0.43	76	92	0.83
11	Okayama Seagulls	44	15	29	47	0.34	70	99	0.71
12	Kurobe AquaFairies	44	15	29	44	0.34	68	101	0.67
13	Aranmare Yamagata	44	5	39	16	0.11	30	121	0.25
14	Gunma Green Wings	44	5	39	15	0.11	34	123	0.28

== Final Ranking ==
Rank	Club
1st place, gold medalist(s)	Osaka Marvelous
2nd place, silver medalist(s)	NEC Red Rockets Kawasaki
3rd place, bronze medalist(s)	SAGA Hisamitsu Springs
4	DENSO AIRYBEES
5	SAITAMA AGEO MEDICS
6	VICTORINA HIMEJI
7	TORAY ARROWS SHIGA
8	Astemo Rivale Ibaraki
9	QUEENSEIS KARIYA
10	PFU BlueCats ISHIKAWA KAHOKU
11	OKAYAMA SEAGULLS
12	KUROBE AQUA FAIRIES
13	Aranmare YAMAGATA
14	GUNMA GREEN WINGS

2024–25 SV.League Women's Champions
Team roster	Setter: Hitomi Shiode, Mina Higashi, Haruka Yamashita Libero: Fuka Inoue, Mana Nishizaki, Yuka Meguro; MB: Sachi Minowa, Erina Ogawa, Nana Sakakibara, Momoka Naruse, Haruka Oyama; OP: Lise Van Hecke; OH: Yuki Nishikawa, Kotona Hayashi, Mizuki Tanaka, Ameze Miyabe, Koyomi Fukumura, Mikoto Shima
Head Coach	Daisuke Sakai

== Awards ==
Awards	Name of the Awards	Name of the Winner	Team Name	Records
Club Award	SV.League Champion	Osaka Marvelous		
Club Award	SV.League Runners-up	NEC Red Rockets Kawasaki		
Club Award	Championship Final Four-T	Saga Hisamitsu Springs		
Club Award	Championship Final Four-B	Denso Airybees		
Club Award	Regular Season Winners	Osaka Marvelous		
Club Award	Best Youth Scheme	Saga Hisamitsu Springs		
Club Award	Best Community Engagement Award	Okayama Seagulls		
Leaders Award	Top Scorer	(Italy) Sylvia Chinelo Nwakalor	Toray Arrows Shiga	1047 pts.
Leaders Award	Top Spiker	(United States) Brionne Butler	Astemo Rivale Ibaraki	51.7%
Leaders Award	Top Server	(Netherlands) Juliet Lohuis	Toray Arrows Shiga	16.9%
Leaders Award	Top Blocker	(United States) Brionne Butler	Astemo Rivale Ibaraki	0.86/set
Leaders Award	Top Serve Receiver	(Japan) Haruna Kawabata	Denso Airybees	54.1%
Individual Award	Regular Season MVP	(Japan) Kotona Hayashi	Osaka Marvelous	
Individual Award	Best Six	(Italy) Sylvia Chinelo Nwakalor	Toray Arrows Shiga	
Individual Award	Best Six	(Japan) Yoshino Sato	NEC Red Rockets Kawasaki	
Individual Award	Best Six	(Brazil) Rosamaria Montibeller	Denso Airybees	
Individual Award	Best Six	(United States) Brionne Butler	Astemo Rivale Ibaraki	
Individual Award	Best Six	(Japan) Haruyo Shimamura	NEC Red Rockets Kawasaki	
Individual Award	Best Six	(Japan) Koyomi Iwasaki	Saitama Ageo Medics	
Individual Award	Libero of the Year	(Japan) Haruna Kawabata	Denso Airybees	
Individual Award	Receiver of the Year	(Japan) Kotona Hayashi	Osaka Marvelous	
Individual Award	Head Coach of the Year	(Japan) Daisuke Sakai	Osaka Marvelous	
Individual Award	Championship MVP	(Japan) Mizuki Tanaka	Osaka Marvelous	
Individual Award	Rookie of the Year	(Japan) Yoshino Sato	NEC Red Rockets Kawasaki	
Individual Award	Fair Play Prize	(Japan) Haruyo Shimamura	NEC Red Rockets Kawasaki	5 sheets
Individual Award	Most Impressive Player	(Brazil) Rosamaria Montibeller	Denso Airybees	
Lifetime Achievement Award		(Japan) Yurie Nabeya	Queenseis Kariya	
Lifetime Achievement Award		(Japan) Akane Yamagishi	Saitama Ageo Medics	
