= 2011–12 V-League (South Korea) =

V League
- Season: 2011–12
- Dates: 22 October 2011 – 15 April 2012

The 2011-12 V-League season was the 8th season of the V-League, the highest professional volleyball league in South Korea. The season started on 22 October 2011 and finished on 15 April 2012. Daejeon Samsung Bluefangs were the defending champions in the men's league and Suwon Hyundai Hillstate the defending female champions.

== Teams ==
=== Men's clubs ===
Location of teams in V-League Men's Clubs

Team	Location	Stadium	Capacity
Cheonan Hyundai Capital Skywalkers	Cheonan	Yu Gwan-sun Gymnasium	5,482
Daejeon Samsung Bluefangs	Daejeon	Chungmu Gymnasium	5,000
Gumi LIG Greaters	Gumi	Park Jeong-hee Gymnasium	6,277
Incheon Korean Air Jumbos	Incheon	Dowon Gymnasium	5,000 Incheon Korean Air Jumbos
Sangmu Volleyball Team	Seongnam	Seongnam Gymnasium	5,711 Seongnam Sports Complex
Seoul Woori Card Dream Six	Seoul	Jangchung Gymnasium	4,618 Jangchung Arena
Suwon KEPCO Vixtorm	Suwon	Suwon Gymnasium	4,317

=== Women's clubs ===
Location of teams in V-League Women's Clubs

Team	Location	Stadium	Capacity
Daejeon KGC	Daejeon	Chungmu Gymnasium	5,000
Seongnam Korea Expressway Hi-pass	Seongnam	Seongnam Gymnasium	5,711 Seongnam Sports Complex
GS Caltex Seoul KIXX	Seoul	Jangchung Gymnasium	4,618 Jangchung Arena
Hwaseong IBK Altos	Hwaseong	Hwaseong Gymnasium	5,152 Hwaseong IBK Altos
Incheon Heungkuk Life Pink Spiders	Incheon	Dowon Gymnasium	5,000 Incheon Korean Air Jumbos
Suwon Hyundai Hillstate	Suwon	Suwon Gymnasium	4,317

== Season standing procedure ==
1. Match points
2. Number of matches won
3. Sets ratio
4. Points ratio
5. Result of the last match between the tied teams

Match won 3–0 or 3–1: 3 match points for the winner, 0 match points for the loser
Match won 3–2: 2 match points for the winner, 1 match point for the loser

== Regular season ==
=== League table (Male) ===
Pos	Team	Pld	W	L	Pts	SR	SPR	Qualification
1	Daejeon Samsung Bluefangs	36	29	7	84	2.447	1.171	Finals
2	Incheon Korean Air Jumbos	36	28	8	80	1.920	1.122	Semifinals
3	Cheonan Hyundai Skywalkers	36	22	14	70	1.509	1.082	Semifinals
4	Suwon KEPCO Vixtorm	36	18	18	52	0.971	1.000	
5	Seoul Woori Card Dream Six	36	15	21	49	0.824	1.020	
6	Gumi LIG Greaters	36	11	25	33	0.647	0.995	
7	Sangmu Volleyball Team	36	3	27	10	0.192	0.635	

=== League table (Female) ===
Pos	Team	Pld	W	L	Pts	SR	SPR	Qualification
1	Daejeon KGC	30	20	10	62	1.674	1.064	Finals
2	Seongnam Korea Expressway Hi-pass	30	19	11	49	1.085	0.973	Semifinals
3	Suwon Hyundai Hillstate	30	15	15	43	0.935	1.024	Semifinals
4	Hwaseong IBK Altos	30	13	17	42	0.902	0.989	
5	Incheon Heungkuk Life Pink Spiders	30	13	17	41	0.892	0.994	
6	GS Caltex Seoul KIXX	30	10	20	33	0.738	0.959	

== Play-offs ==
=== Bracket (Male) ===
Semifinals
1	Daejeon Samsung Bluefangs
2	Incheon Korean Air Jumbos	3	0	3
3	Cheonan Hyundai Skywalkers	2	3	2

Finals
1	Daejeon Samsung Bluefangs	3	3	1	3
2	Incheon Korean Air Jumbos	1	1	3	0

=== Bracket (Female) ===
Semifinals
1	Daejeon KGC
2	Seongnam Korea Expressway Hi-pass	0	1
3	Suwon Hyundai Hillstate	3	3

Finals
1	Daejeon KGC	3	0	3	0	3
2	Suwon Hyundai Hillstate	1	3	0	3	1

== Top Scorers ==
=== Men's ===
Rank	Player	Club	Points
1	(Canada) Gavin Schmitt	Daejeon Samsung Bluefangs	1112
2	(Croatia) Andelko Ćuk	Suwon KEPCO Vixtorm	1015
3	(Canada) Dallas Soonias	Cheonan Hyundai Skywalkers	885
4	(Slovenia) Martin Nemec	Incheon Korean Air Jumbos	755
5	(South Korea) Kim Yo-han	Gumi LIG Greaters	671
6	(South Korea) Kim Hak-min	Incheon Korean Air Jumbos	591
7	(South Korea) Moon Sung-min	Cheonan Hyundai Skywalkers	503
8	(South Korea) Choi Hong-suk	Seoul Woori Card Dream Six	490
9	(South Korea) Park Chul-woo	Daejeon Samsung Bluefangs	457
10	(South Korea) Kim Jung-hwan	Seoul Woori Card Dream Six	423

=== Women's ===
Rank	Player	Club	Points
1	(Colombia) Madelaynne Montaño	Daejeon KGC	1076
2	(Ukraine) Olesia Rykhliuk	Hwaseong IBK Altos	909
3	(Croatia) Mia Jerkov	Incheon Heungkuk Life Pink Spiders	884
4	(South Korea) Yang Hyo-jin	Suwon Hyundai Hillstate	483
5	(South Korea) Hwang Yeon-joo	Suwon Hyundai Hillstate	442
6	(Argentina) Georgina Pinedo	Seongnam Korea Expressway Hi-pass	428
7	(South Korea) Han Song-yi	GS Caltex Seoul KIXX	414
8	(South Korea) Jung Dae-young	GS Caltex Seoul KIXX	358
9	(Serbia) Ivana Nešović	Seongnam Korea Expressway Hi-pass	331
10	(Serbia) Brankica Mihajlović	Suwon Hyundai Hillstate	311

== Player of the Round ==
=== Men's ===
Round	Player	Club
1	(Canada) Gavin Schmitt	Daejeon Samsung Bluefangs
2	(Canada) Dallas Soonias	Cheonan Hyundai Skywalkers
3	(Slovenia) Martin Nemec	Incheon Korean Air Jumbos
4	(South Korea) Kim Hak-min	Incheon Korean Air Jumbos
5	(Croatia) Andelko Ćuk	Suwon KEPCO Vixtorm
6	(South Korea) Kim Yo-han	Gumi LIG Greaters

=== Women's ===
Round	Player	Club
1	(Colombia) Madelaynne Montaño	Daejeon KGC
2	(Colombia) Madelaynne Montaño	Daejeon KGC
3	(South Korea) Kim Sa-nee	Incheon Heungkuk Life Pink Spiders
4	(South Korea) Yang Hyo-jin	Suwon Hyundai Hillstate
5	(Serbia) Ivana Nešović	Seongnam Korea Expressway Hi-pass
6	(Serbia) Ivana Nešović	Seongnam Korea Expressway Hi-pass

== Final standing ==
=== Men's League ===
Rank	Team
1st place, gold medalist(s)	Daejeon Samsung Bluefangs
2nd place, silver medalist(s)	Incheon Korean Air Jumbos
3rd place, bronze medalist(s)	Cheonan Hyundai Skywalkers
4	Suwon KEPCO Vixtorm
5	Seoul Woori Card Dream Six
6	Gumi LIG Greaters
7	Sangmu Volleyball Team

=== Women's League ===
Rank	Team
1st place, gold medalist(s)	Daejeon KGC
2nd place, silver medalist(s)	Suwon Hyundai Hillstate
3rd place, bronze medalist(s)	Seongnam Korea Expressway Hi-pass
4	Hwaseong IBK Altos
5	Incheon Heungkuk Life Pink Spiders
6	GS Caltex Seoul KIXX
