= Shikoku Eighty 8 Queen =

Japanese volleyball club

Club Name	四国Eighty8Queen
Nickname	エイティエイツ (Eighty Eights)
Arena	Takamatsu city, Kagawa, Japan.
Manager	Hisao Takahashi
Head coach	Kazunori Yoneda
League	V.Challenge League
Position 2010-11	7th place
Team Colors	Blue
Website	https://web.archive.org/web/20080916164304/http://www.eighty8.jp/index.html

Shikoku Eighty 8 Queen is a women's volleyball team based in Takamatsu, Kagawa, Shikoku District, Japan. It plays in V.Challenge League. The club was founded in 2005). It is operated by NPO J-HOT Volleyball Federation.
General Manager and head coach is Kazunori Yoneda who was the former head coach of women's volleyball national team of Japan.

== History ==
- It was founded in 2005.
- It promoted to V.Challenge League in 2007.
- In October 2008, Two players are rental transferred for the register from Denso Airybees in order to reinforce strength.
- On July 1, 2011, the team has suspended the activities because lack of funds.
- In August 2011, the team resumed and moved to Sendai, and so renamed as Sendai Belle Fille.

== League results ==
League		Position	Teams	Matches	Win	Lose
V・challenge	2007-08	6th	8	14	3	11
V・challenge	2008-09	5th	10	18	11	7
V・challenge	2009-10	10th	12	16	6	10
V・challenge	2010-11	7th	12	18	7	11

== Current squad ==
As of June 2011

- 1 (Japan) Junko Takahashi
- 3 (Japan) Orie Haga
- 4 (Japan) Mieko Uchihara
- 5 (Japan) Minako Nakajima
- 10 (Japan) Mai Uemura
- 12 (Japan) Suzue Inui
- 13 (Japan) Sakika Osuga
- 14 (China) Ya Chen Wang
- 15 (Japan) Saori Kimura (1988birth)

== Former players ==
- (Japan) Akina Ida (-2009)
- (Japan) Nanami Inoue (2008–09)
- (Japan) Naoko Takahashi (2008–09)
- (Japan) Rie Sasazaki
- (Japan) Natsumi Oka
- (Japan) Aya Matsuda
