= Hosoda =

Hosoda (written: 細田) is a Japanese surname. Notable people with the surname include:

- Eri Hosoda (細田 絵理, born 1984), Japanese volleyball player
- Hiroshi Hosoda, Japanese general, vice chief of staff of the Ground Self-Defense Force
- Hiroyuki Hosoda (細田 博之, born 1944), Japanese politician
- Mamoru Hosoda (細田 守, born 1967), Japanese film director and animator
- Tomomi Hosoda (細田 朋美, born 1971), Japanese swimmer
- Tomoya Hosoda (細田 智也, born 1991), Japanese politician
- Yoshihiko Hosoda (細田 よしひこ, born 1988), Japanese actor
- Yuichi Hosoda (細田 雄一, born 1984), Japanese triathlete
