= Shiho Yoshimura =

Japanese volleyball player (born 1989)

Personal information
- Born: December 13, 1989 (age 36); Isehara, Kanagawa, Japan
- Height: 5 ft 6 (168 cm)
- Weight: 150 lb (68kg)

Career
Years	Teams
2011-2016	Ageo Medics

Shiho Yoshimura (吉村志穂, Yoshimura Shiho; born December 13, 1989) is a former Japanese volleyball player. She played for Ageo Medics in the V Premier League.

== Early life and career ==
Yoshimura was born in Isehara City, Kanagawa Prefecture. In the third year of elementary school, she started playing volleyball under the influence of her sister. At Kawasaki Tachibana High School, she was active in the 2007 Saga Inter High (Best 4).

In 2008, Yoshimura attended Tokai University and joined Akari Omi and Kaname Yamaguchi as first-year quartet ace spikers to win second place in the second league in the spring of the same year.

In July 2011, Yoshimura was elected as the 26th Universiade's representative.

In December of the same year, she became the driving force of the victory at All Japan Incare and won the Best Scorer Award. In December 2011, her transfer to Challenge League Ageo Medics was decided.

In the 2012/13 V.Challenge League, Yoshimura made a significant contribution to the team's second victory as an ace and won the Best New Face Award. In 2013 Yoshimura was a representative in the Summer Universiade.

In June 2016, Ageo Medics announced Yoshimura's resignation.

== Teams ==
- Kawasaki Tachibana High School
- Tokai University (2008–2012)
- Ageo Medics (2012–2016)
