= Chihiro Kato =

Chihiro Kato may refer to:

- Chihiro Kato (volleyball) (加藤 千尋, born 1988), Japanese volleyball player
- Chihiro Kato (footballer) (加藤 千尋, born 1998), Japanese footballer
