= Saitama Ageo Medics =

Japanese volleyball team

- Ground: Ageo, Saitama, Japan
- Manager Head Coach: (Japan) Masahiro Hirukawa (Japan) Shigekazu Okubo
- Captain: Mami Uchiseto
- League: SV.League
- 2025-26: 8th place
- Website: Club home page

Uniforms
Home	Away

Saitama Ageo Medics (埼玉上尾メディックス Saitama Ageo Medikkusu) is a women's volleyball team based in Ageo city, Saitama, Japan. It plays in SV.League. The club was founded in 2001. The owner of the team is Ageo Medical Group.

== History ==
- Founded in 2001.
- Promoted to V.Challenge League in 2003.
- Won 2010-11 V.Challenge League for the first time.
- On 6 April 2014 Medics beat JT Marvelous in the V.Challenge match, winning promotion to V.Premier league for the coming season.

== League results ==
League		Position	Teams	Matches	Win	Lose
V1.League	6th (2003–04)	6th	7	12	2	10
V1.League	7th (2004–05)	5th	8	14	8	6
V1.League	8th (2005–06)	8th	8	14	2	12
V・challenge	2006-07	Third place	8	14	9	5
V・challenge	2007-08	Third place	8	14	10	4
V・challenge	2008-09	Third place	10	18	14	4
V・challenge	2009-10	Runner-up	12	16	12	4
V・challenge	2010-11	Champion	12	20	19	1
V・challenge	2011-12	Runner-up	12	22	20	2
V・challenge	2012-13	Champion	10	18	17	1
V・challenge	2013-14	Runner-up	10	18	17	1
V.Premier	2014-15	Third place	8	21	12	9
V.Premier	2015-16	8th	8	21	6	15
V・challenge	2016-17	Runner-up	8	21	20	1
V・Premier	2017-18	7th	8	21	7	14
V・Cup	2020-21	Champion	12	7	7	0
V.League Division 1 (V1)	2018–19	7th	11	20	11	9
V.League Division 1 (V1)	2019-20	Third place	12	21	13	8
V.League Division 1 (V1)	2020-21	5th	12	20	12	8
V.League Division 1 (V1)	2021-22	5th	12	33	20	13
V.League Division 1 (V1)	2022–23	4th	12	36	25	11
SV.League	2024-25	5th	14	44	27	17
SV.League	2025-26	8th	14	44	23	21

== Current squad ==
2026/27 Squad as of November 2026

- Head coach: (Japan) Shigekazu Okubo

No.	Name	Position	Date of birth	Height (m)
1	(Japan) Hiroyo Yamanaka	Middle Blocker	11 November 1999 (age 27)	1.81 m (5 ft 11 in)
2	(Japan) Koyomi Iwasaki	Setter	1 May 1989 (age 37)	1.75 m (5 ft 9 in)
4	(Japan) Asuka Hamamtsu	Middle Blocker	22 December 1998 (age 27)	1.82 m (6 ft 0 in)
6	(Japan) Aki Meguro	Outside Hitter	25 May 1998 (age 28)	1.72 m (5 ft 8 in)
7	(Japan) Nanami Inoue	Middle Blocker	19 June 1989 (age 37)	1.79 m (5 ft 10 in)
8	(Japan) Rina Yamaji	Outside Hitter	8 October 2002 (age 24)	1.78 m (5 ft 10 in)
9	(Japan) Sora Ishiro	Opposite Hitter	10 March 2003 (age 23)	1.75 m (5 ft 9 in)
10	(Japan) Shuka Kaneda	Outside Hitter	6 June 1996 (age 30)	1.76 m (5 ft 9 in)
11	(Japan) Mai Irisawa	Middle Blocker	2 June 1999 (age 27)	1.88 m (6 ft 2 in)
14	(Japan) Okumuoba Fuyumihaui	Outside Hitter	27 June 1998 (age 28)	1.77 m (5 ft 10 in)
16	(United States) Izabella Maria Rapacz	Opposite Hitter	25 September 1995 (age 31)	1.88 m (6 ft 2 in)
17	(Japan) Saki Kamata	Setter	26 January 1999 (age 27)	1.65 m (5 ft 5 in)
18	(Japan) Hirona Gonda	Middle Blocker	11 January 2001 (age 25)	1.87 m (6 ft 2 in)
19	(Thailand) Chatchu-On Moksri	Outside Hitter	6 November 1999 (age 27)	1.81 m (5 ft 11 in)
20	(Japan) Hikaru Takeno	Libero	11 June 1999 (age 27)	1.67 m (5 ft 6 in)
22	(Japan) Mei Koyama	Setter	19 October 2006 (age 20)	1.67 m (5 ft 6 in)
23	(Thailand) Jidapa Nahuanong	Libero	22 February 2002 (age 24)	1.72 m (5 ft 8 in)

== Former players ==
Domestic players

Japan

- Tomomi Nakao (2002–2009)
- Ayuka Hattori (2009–2012)
- Yurie Yamamoto (2010–2012)
- Maiko Hanzawa (2010–2012)
- Mai Seki (2008–2015)
- Asuka Minamoto (2010–2015)
- Saori Arita (2011–2013) (2014–2017)
- Nozomi Tsuchida (2012–2016)
- Erika Araki Shinomiya (2014–2016), transferred to Toyota Auto Body Queenseis
- Yoshika Okamoto (2014–2016)
- Shiho Kondo (2012–2018)
- Ayaka Matsumoto (2016–2019)
- Natsuko Kozasa (2012–2018)
- Miku Benoki (2014–2018)
- Yuki Araki (2014–2019)
- Shiho Yoshimura (2012–2016)
- Mami Miura (2012–2020)
- Misaki Inoue (2016–2020), transferred to Hisamitsu Springs
- Miyuki Horie (2016–2021)
- Risa Omuro (2012–2021)

Foreign Players

Canada

- Shainah Joseph (2020–2021)

Croatia

- Katarina Barun Šušnjar (2018–2020)

Cuba

- Rosir Calderon (2016–2017)
- Kenia Carcaces (2017–2018)

Dominican Republic

- Sidarka Núñez (2007–08)
- Altagracia Mambrú (2008–09)

Italy

- Valentina Fiorin (2011–2012)

Philippines

- Jaja Santiago (2022–2023)

Serbia

- Sara Lozo (2022-)

Slovenia

- Nika Markovič (2024-)

Ukraine

- Olena Ustymenko (2012–2013)

United States

- Nancy Metcalf (2013–2014)
- Kelly Murphy (2014–2016)
