= Tomoko Okano =

Japanese volleyball player

Personal information
- Full name: Tomoko Okano
- Nickname: Tomo
- Born: August 29, 1979 (age 47) Chikusei, Ibaraki, Japan
- Height: 1.77 m (5 ft 10 in)
- Weight: 64 kg (141 lb)
- Spike: 286 cm (113 in)
- Block: 280 cm (110 in)

Volleyball information
- Position: Wing Spiker

Tomoko Okano (岡野知子 Okano Tomoko, born August 29, 1979) is a former Japanese volleyball player. She served as the captain of Denso Airybees between 2006 and 2009.

== Clubs ==
- Kokugakuin Univ. Tochigi High School → Kaetujoshi college → Denso Airybees (2000–2009)

== National team ==
- Japan Universiade national team (1999, 2001)

== Honors ==
- Team
  - Japan Volleyball League/V.League/V.Premier
    Runners-up (1): 2007-2008
  - Kurowashiki All Japan Volleyball Championship
    Champions (1): 2008
- Individual
  - 2008 2007-08 Premier.League Excellent player award
  - 2009 2008-09 Premier.League Receive award
