= Aleeza Aichi =

Women's volleyball team

- Founded: 1951
- Ground: Kariya city, Aichi, Japan
- Manager Head coach: (Japan) (Japan) Shingo Sakai
- Captain: (Japan) Ayano Sato
- League: SV.League
- 2025-26: 6th Place
- Website: Club home page

Uniforms
Home	Away

Aleeza Aichi (アリーザ愛知, Arīza Aichi), formerly the Queenseis Kariya (クインシーズ刈谷, Kuinshīzu Kariya) is a women's volleyball team based in Kariya city, Aichi, Japan. It plays in SV.League. The club was founded in 1951. The owner of the team is Toyota Auto Body.

Queenseis is a coined word combining Queen and Seis ("six" in Spanish).

== History ==
- It was founded in 1951.
- It promoted to V.Challenge League in 1999.
- It promoted to V.Premier League in 2006.
- It rebranding as Aleeza Aichi on June 2026.

== Honours ==
- V.Challenge League
  - Champion(1) - 2005-06
  - Runner-up(1) - 2004-05
- Empress's Cup
  - Champion (1): 2008
  - Runner-up (2): 2011, 2018
  - Champion (1): 2017
- Kurowashiki All Japan Volleyball Tournament
  - Champion (1): 2014

== League results ==
League		Position	Teams	Matches	Win	Lose
V.Challenge.League	3rd (2000–01)	6th	8	14	4	10
V.Challenge.League	4th (2001–02)	5th	7	12	4	8
V.Challenge.League	5th (2002–03)	5th	8	14	5	9
V.Challenge.League	6th (2003–04)	3rd	7	12	8	4
V.Challenge.League	7th (2004–05)	Runner-up	8	14	11	3
V.Challenge.League	8th (2005–06)	Champion	8	14	12	2
V・Premier	2006-07	10th	10	27	5	22
V・Premier	2007-08	7th	10	27	12	15
V・Premier	2008-09	5th	10	27	13	14
V・Premier	2009-10	7th	8	28	7	21
V・Premier	2010-11	5th	8	26	12	14
V・Premier	2011-12	7th	8	21	5	16
V・Premier	2012-13	5th	8	28	12	16
V・Premier	2013-14	4th	8	28	15	13
V・Premier	2014-15	8th	8	21	6	15
V・Premier	2015-16	6th	8	21	8	13
V・Premier	2016-17	5th	8	21	10	11
V・Premier	2017-18	3rd	8	21	11	10
V.League Division 1 (V1)	2018-19	4th	11	20	13	7
V.League Division 1 (V1)	2019-20	5th	12	21	14	7
V.League Division 1 (V1)	2020–21	11th	12	21	6	15
SV.League	2024-25	9th	14	44	20	24
SV.League	2025-26	6th	14	44	26	18

== Current squad ==
2026/27 Squad as of November 2026

- Head coach: (Japan) Shingo Sakai

No.	Name	Position	Date of birth	Height (m)
1	(Japan) Hinata Shigihara	Outside Hitter	25 February 2001 (age 25)	1.77 m (5 ft 10 in)
3	(Japan) Furi Kosa	Setter	4 September 2000 (age 26)	1.66 m (5 ft 5 in)
4	(Japan) Riri Kasai	Outside Hitter	22 April 2005 (age 21)	1.75 m (5 ft 9 in)
5	(Japan) Sayaka Yokota	Middle Blocker	30 September 1999 (age 27)	1.78 m (5 ft 10 in)
6	(United States) Lindsey Ruddins	Opposite Hitter	5 November 1997 (age 29)	1.91 m (6 ft 3 in)
7	(Japan) Ayana Funane	Opposite Hitter	15 May 2002 (age 24)	1.81 m (5 ft 11 in)
8	(Japan) Ayano Sato (c)	Setter	4 November 1999 (age 27)	1.65 m (5 ft 5 in)
9	(Japan) Yuki Yoshinaga	Outside Hitter	23 November 2001 (age 24)	1.71 m (5 ft 7 in)
12	(Japan) Haruka Nakamura	Libero	5 December 2002 (age 23)	1.49 m (4 ft 11 in)
13	(Thailand) Nootsara Tomkom	Setter	7 July 1985 (age 41)	1.69 m (5 ft 7 in)
14	(Switzerland) Laura Kunzler	Outside Hitter	25 December 1996 (age 29)	1.89 m (6 ft 2 in)
15	(Japan) Yuka Tateishi	Libero	21 March 1998 (age 28)	1.67 m (5 ft 6 in)
17	(Japan) Aimi Nakada	Middle Blocker	28 July 2006 (age 20)	1.84 m (6 ft 0 in)
18	(Japan) Shiori Mitome	Outside Hitter	2 December 2002 (age 23)	1.73 m (5 ft 8 in)
19	(Japan) Yuka Iwashima	Middle Blocker	16 September 2002 (age 24)	1.76 m (5 ft 9 in)
20	(Japan) Mio Kitagawa	Middle Blocker	19 April 2006 (age 20)	1.76 m (5 ft 9 in)
21	(Dominican Republic) Jineiry Martinez	Middle Blocker	3 December 1997 (age 28)	1.95 m (6 ft 5 in)
22	(Japan) Rin Nishikawa	Libero	7 June 2006 (age 20)	1.58 m (5 ft 2 in)
23	(Japan) Shiori Yamauchi	Outside Hitter	28 May 2006 (age 20)	1.75 m (5 ft 9 in)

== Former players ==
Domestic players

Japan

- Eika Oikawa (2004–2008)
- Midori Hane (2002–2011)
- Sakie Takahashi (2011–2014)
- Yumiko Tsuzuki (2006–2012)
- Kaori Tahara (2009–2013)
- Yoshiko Yano (2012–2014)
- Kasumi Takamoto (2012–2014)
- Yukiji Kajiwara (2009–2014)
- Seiko Kawamura (2009–2012) (2013–2014)
- Ayako Sana (2009–2014)
- Yuki Shōji (2013–2015)
- Ikumi Nishibori (2013–2015)
- Mari Yamada (2009–2017)
- Saki Takeda (2011–2018)
- Miyuki Hiramatsu (2010–2018)
- Mio Satō (2014-2019) Transferred to NEC Red Rockets
- Momoko Higane (2014-2019)
- Saori Takahashi (2014–2020)
- Marina Shichi (2014–2020)
- Nozomi Kanemoto (2016–2020)
- Mami Uchiseto (2018–2020) Transferred to Saitama Ageo Medics
- Nao Muranaga (2015–2021)
- Aya Watanabe (2017–2021) Transferred to Hitachi Rivale
- Risako Yamagata (2017-2022)
- Yukiho Hara (2020-2022)
- Wakaba Sugihara (2021-2022)
- Kazane Kumai (2020-2022)

Foreign players

Azerbaijan

- Polina Rahimova (2015–2017)

Brazil

- Renata Colombo (2008-2010)

Belgium

- Lise Van Hecke (2023-2024)
- Kaja Grobelna (2024-2025)

Germany

- Marie Schölzel (2025-)

Italy

- Indre Sorokaite (2020–2021)

Russia

- Sofya Kuznetsova (2025-)

Thailand

- Pornpun Guedpard (2020–2021)
- Hattaya Bamrungsuk (2021-2025)
- Nootsara Tomkom (2025-)

Turkey

- Neriman Özsoy (2017–2020)

United States

- Jennifer Joines (2007–2008)
- Foluke Akinradewo (2010-2011)
- Lauren Gibbemeyer (2011–2012)
- Kanani Danielson (2012-2015)
- Kelsey Robinson (2021-2022)
- Danielle Cuttino (2022-2023) (2025-)
