= Ohno Group Hiroshima Oilers =

Japanese volleyball club

Ohno-group Hiroshima Oilers
- Founded: 1992
- Ground: Hiroshima City and Fukuyama, Hiroshima Prefecture, Japan
- Manager Head coach: (Japan) Yuji Taniguchi (Japan) Hikaru Suzuki
- Captain: Yuriko Yamauchi
- League: V.League Division 2
- 2019–20: 6th place (V2)
- Website: Club home page

Uniforms
Home	Away

Ohno-group Hiroshima Oilers (大野石油広島オイラーズ, Ōno Sekiyu Hiroshima Oirāzu) is a women's volleyball team based in Hiroshima, Hiroshima and Fukuyama, Hiroshima, Japan. It plays in V.League Division 2. The club was founded in 1992 as OSC (Ohno-group Sports Club). The owner of the team is Ohno-group.

== History ==
- 1992 – Founded as Ohno oil Sports Club
- 1994 – Renamed Ohno oil Hiroshima (Regional League)
- 2002 – Won the Regional League
- 2003 – Promoted to V.Challenge League 1
- 2007 – Nicknamed "Oilers" (Ohno-group Hiroshima Oilers)
- 2018 – Promoted to V.League Women Division 2

== League results ==
Official Record

League		Position	Teams	Matches	Win	Lose
V1.League	6th (2003–04)	7th	7	12	1	11
V1.League	7th (2004–05)	6th	8	14	3	11
V1.League	8th (2005–06)	6th	8	14	4	10
V・challenge	2006-07	4th	8	14	7	7
V・challenge	2007-08	5th	8	14	8	6
V・challenge	2008-09	4th	10	18	12	6
V・challenge	2009-10	6th	12	16	7	9
V・challenge	2010-11	9th	12	19	6	13
V・challenge	2011-12	4th	12	22	13	9
V・challenge	2012–13	3rd	10	18	13	5
V・challenge	2013–14	5th	10	18	8	10
V・challenge	2014–15	3rd	10	18	13	5
V・challenge 1	2015–16	6th	8	21	6	15
V・challenge 1	2016–17	6th	8	21	9	12
V・challenge 1	2017–18	7th	7	18	3	14
V.League Division 2	2018–19	6th	10	18	9	9
V.League Division 2	2019–20	6th	8	21	8	13
V.League Division 2	2020–21	6th	9	13	4	9

== Current squad ==
2019–20 Squad as of 9 February – 2020

- Head coach: (Japan) Hiraku Suzuki (鈴木 輝)

No.	Name	Position	Date of birth	Height (m)	Weight (kg)	Spike (cm)
1	(Japan) Minari Kitagawa	Middle blocker	10 December 1993 (age 32)	1.72 m (5 ft 8 in)	67 kg (148 lb)	290
2	(Japan) Masaki Ohnishi	Outside hitter	18 July 2000 (age 25)	1.72 m (5 ft 8 in)	70 kg (150 lb)	285
3	(Japan) Nari Isobe	Middle blocker	9 July 1993 (age 32)	1.76 m (5 ft 9 in)	72 kg (159 lb)	288
4	(Japan) Yuuna Hasegawa	Setter	8 January 1995 (age 31)	1.67 m (5 ft 6 in)	60 kg (130 lb)	273
5	(Japan) Mai Kakizaki	Outside hitter	29 September 1997 (age 28)	1.73 m (5 ft 8 in)	63 kg (139 lb)	275
6	(Japan) Chiaki Kawase	Middle blocker	27 November 1997 (age 28)	1.70 m (5 ft 7 in)	60 kg (130 lb)	280
7	(Japan) Ayano Sakaguchi	Setter	26 March 1998 (age 28)	1.68 m (5 ft 6 in)	52 kg (115 lb)	260
8	(Japan) Shiho Yoshimoto	Outside hitter	11 September 1996 (age 29)	1.67 m (5 ft 6 in)	55 kg (121 lb)	283
9	(Japan) Megumi Sato	Outside hitter	7 September 1997 (age 28)	1.75 m (5 ft 9 in)	61 kg (134 lb)	295
10	(Japan) Yuriko Yamauchi (C)	Opposite	9 September 1992 (age 33)	1.68 m (5 ft 6 in)	63 kg (139 lb)	275
11	(Japan) Yuika Nakata	Outside hitter	16 August 1993 (age 32)	1.67 m (5 ft 6 in)	64 kg (141 lb)	280
12	(Japan) Manami Komada	Outside hitter	6 August 1997 (age 28)	1.74 m (5 ft 9 in)	62 kg (137 lb)	295
13	(Japan) Aika Ito	Libero	24 February 2000 (age 26)	1.58 m (5 ft 2 in)	65 kg (143 lb)	
14	(Japan) Tomomi Nishida	Middle blocker	10 November 1995 (age 30)	1.79 m (5 ft 10 in)	70 kg (150 lb)	305
15	(Japan) Yuuka Saito	Outside hitter	27 March 2000 (age 26)	1.64 m (5 ft 5 in)	62 kg (137 lb)	283
16	(Japan) Rie Mitsui	Outside hitter	10 February 2000 (age 26)	1.71 m (5 ft 7 in)	61 kg (134 lb)	292
17	(Japan) Mao Tsuchioka	Libero	8 July 1999 (age 26)	1.58 m (5 ft 2 in)	65 kg (143 lb)	268
19	(Japan) Miho Mitsunaga	Setter	28 April 1995 (age 30)	1.52 m (5 ft 0 in)	52 kg (115 lb)	260

== Former players ==
- Yoshiko Ueda
- Yurina Inoue
- Nanako Senoo
- Hiroyo Shigemitsu
- Mari Kuwazane
- Kayoko Kouke
- Megumi Ebihara
- Suzuka Takimoto
- Tomomi Matsui
- Mami Kobara
- Yumi Harukawa
- Norie Sakane
- Akane Matsumoto
- Hikaru Arase
- Ryōko Tanaka
