= Mai Uemura =

Japanese volleyball player

Personal information
- Full name: Mai Uemura
- Nickname: Leo
- Born: September 15, 1987 (age 39); Watarai, Mie, Japan
- Height: 1.83 m (6 ft 0 in)
- Weight: 74 kg (163 lb)
- Spike: 279 cm (110 in)
- Block: 275 cm (108 in)

Volleyball information
- Position: Middle Blocker
- Current club: Shikoku Eighty 8 Queen

Mai Uemura (上村 麻衣 Uemura Mai, born September 15, 1987) is a Japanese volleyball player who plays for Shikoku Eighty 8 Queen.

== Clubs ==
- Tsushogyo High School → Denso Airybees (2006–2009) → Shikoku Eighty 8 Queen (2009-)

== Honors ==
- Team
  - Japan Volleyball League/V.League/V.Premier
    Runners-up (1): 2007–2008
  - Kurowashiki All Japan Volleyball Championship
    Champions (1): 2008
