= Ayako Sana =

Japanese volleyball player

Personal information
- Full name: Ayako Sana
- Nickname: Ako
- Born: May 18, 1985 (age 41); Taito, Tokyo, Japan
- Height: 1.80 m (5 ft 11 in)
- Weight: 66 kg (146 lb)
- Spike: 292 cm (115 in)
- Block: 286 cm (113 in)

Volleyball information
- Position: Wing Spiker
- Current club: Toyota Auto Body Queenseis
- Number: 9

Ayako Sana (眞恵子 Sana Ayako, born May 18, 1985) is a Japanese volleyball player who plays for Toyota Auto Body Queenseis.

== Profiles ==
- Her father and grandfather were Sumo wrestlers.

== Clubs ==
- Shukutokugakuen High School → Denso Airybees (2004–2009) → Toyota Auto Body Queenseis (2009-)

== National team ==
- Japan Youth national team (2000)
- Japan Junior national team (2002)

== Awards ==
=== Team ===
- 2007-08 Japan Volleyball League/V.League/V.Premier - Runner-up, with Denso Airybees.
- 2008 57th Kurowashiki All Japan Volleyball Tournament - Champion, with Denso.
