= Haruna Kawabata =

Japanese volleyball player (born 2001)

Personal information
- Full name: Haruna Kawabata
- Nationality: Japanese
- Born: 8 February 2001 (age 25) Gifu, Japan
- Education: Tokai University
- Height: 1.63 m (5 ft 4 in)
- Weight: 58 kg (128 lb)
- Spike: 274 cm (108 in)
- Block: 255 cm (100 in)

Volleyball information
- Position: Libero
- Current club: (Japan) Denso Airybees
- Number: 23 (national); 4 (club)

Career
- Years: Team
- 2016–2019 2019–2023 2023-present: (Japan) Kyoto Tachibana High School (Japan) Tokai University (Japan) Denso Airybees

National team
- Years: Team
- 2023, 2025: Japan
Honours
Women's volleyball
Representing Japan
FISU World University Games
Silver medal – second place	2021 Chengdu	Team

Haruna Kawabata (川畑 遥奈, Kawabata Haruna; born 8 February 2001) is a Japanese professional volleyball player. She plays in the SV.League for Denso Airybees.

== Career ==
=== Early Years ===
She enrolled at Tokai University. She was selected to represent Japan at 2021 FISU World University Games.

In her fourth year, the team achieved remarkable success of becoming the first university team to reach the semi-final of the 70th Kurowashiki All Japan Volleyball Tournament.

After that, the team achieved a quadruple crown, winning the Kanto University Autumn & Spring Championship, East Japan Intercollegiate Championship, and All Japan Intercollegiate Championship. In her final All Japan Intercollegiate Championship, she won the championship for the second consecutive year.

=== Professional Years ===
In 2022, Denso Airybees announced that she would join the team.

In 2025, she was selected for the Japan women's national volleyball team for the first time.

== Award ==
=== Individual ===
- 2019-20 Kanto University Autumn League - Best Receiver
- 2021 FISU World University Games - Best Libero, Best Digger, Best Receiver
- 2021-22 All Japan Intercollegiate Championship - Best Libero
- 2022-23 All Japan Intercollegiate Championship - Best Libero
- 2022-23 Kanto University Autumn League - Best Libero, Best Receiver
- 2022-23 Kanto University Spring League - Best Libero, Best Receiver
- 2022-23 East Japan Intercollegiate Championship - Best Libero
- 2024-25 SV.League Women's - Best Libero, Best Receiver

=== University Team ===
- 2019-20 All Japan Intercollegiate Championship - - Bronze Medal, with Tokai University
- 2019-20 Kanto University Autumn League - Champion, with Tokai University
- 2020-21 All Japan Intercollegiate Championship - - Runner-up, with Tokai University
- 2021-22 Kurowashiki All Japan Volleyball Tournament - - Bronze Medal, with Tokai University
- 2021-22 All Japan Intercollegiate Championship - - Champion, with Tokai University
- 2021-22 Kanto University Autumn League - - Runner-up, with Tokai University
- 2022-23 All Japan Intercollegiate Championship - - Champion, with Tokai University
- 2022-23 Kanto University Autumn League - - Champion, with Tokai University
- 2022-23 Kanto University Spring League - - Champion, with Tokai University
- 2022-23 East Japan Intercollegiate Championship - - Champion, with Tokai University

=== Club Team ===
- 2023-24 Kurowashiki All Japan Volleyball Tournament - - Runner-up, with Denso Airybees

=== National Team ===
- (China) 2021 FISU World University Games - - Runner-up
