= Ayaka Matsumoto =

Japanese volleyball player (born 1988)

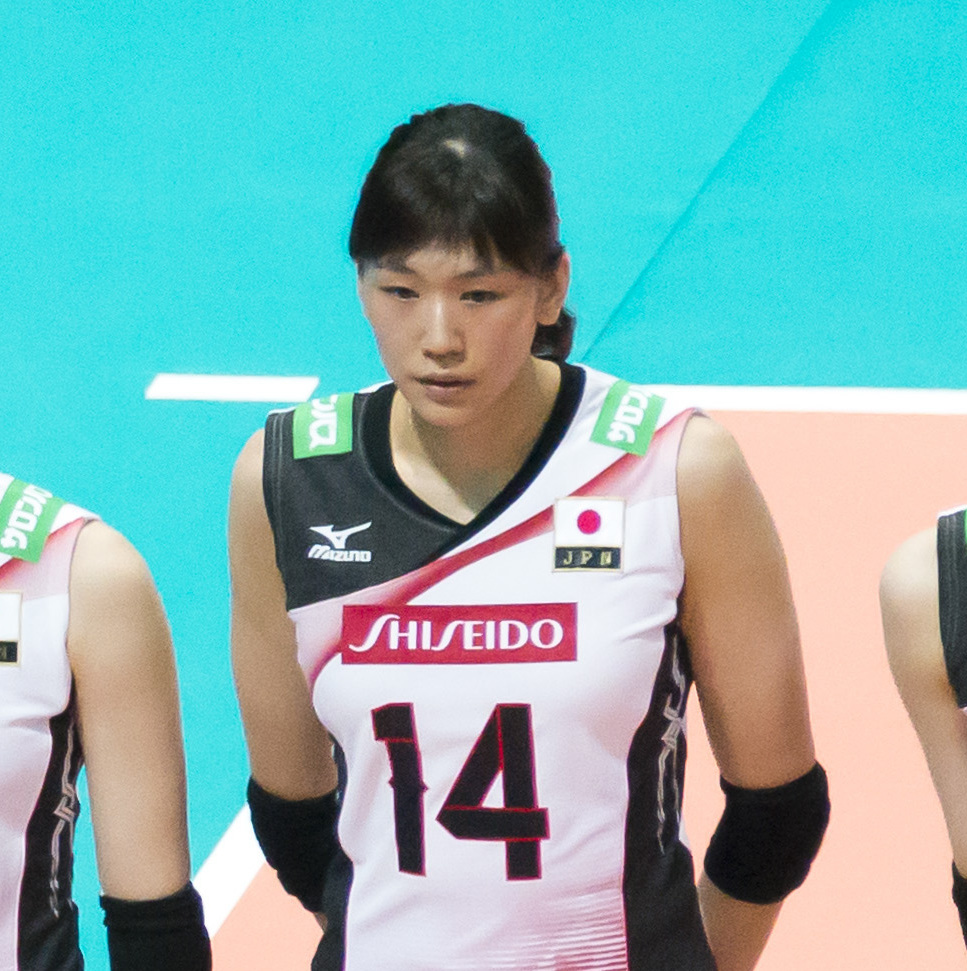

Personal information
- Nickname: Jacky
- Born: 26 December 1988 (age 37); Beijing, China
- Height: 188 cm (6 ft 2 in)
- Weight: 70 kg (150 lb)
- Spike: 326 cm (128 in)
- Block: 312 cm (123 in)

Volleyball information
- Position: Middle blocker
- Current club: Ageo Medics

National team
Japan

Ayaka Matsumoto (松本 亜弥華, Matsumoto Ayaka; born 26 December 1988) is a Japanese volleyball player.

== Life ==
She was born with the name Ya Chen Wang in China. Whilst being educated in America she played for Jefferson College and Long Beach State. She graduated from Jefferson College in 2009.

She became a naturalized Japanese citizen in 2015 and assumed a Japanese name. She was selected for the Japan women's national volleyball team in 2017.
