= Keiki Nishiyama =

Japanese volleyball player (born 1988)

Personal information
- Full name: Keiki Nishiyama
- Nickname: Keiki
- Born: 19 October 1988 (age 38); Kyoto, Kyoto, Japan
- Height: 1.76 m (5 ft 9 in)
- Weight: 66 kg (146 lb)
- Spike: 295 cm (116 in)
- Block: 285 cm (112 in)

Volleyball information
- Position: Wing Spiker
- Current club: JT Marvelous
- Number: 12

National team
Japan (2008)

Keiki Nishiyama (西山 慶樹 Nishiyama Keiki, born 19 October 1988) is a Japanese volleyball player who plays for JT Marvelous.

== Clubs ==
- (Japan) Kyoto Tachibana High School
- (Japan) JT Marvelous (2007–)

== Awards ==
=== Team ===
- 2009–2010 V.Premier League – Runner-Up, with JT Marvelous.
- 2010 59th Kurowashiki All Japan Volleyball Tournament – Runner-Up, with JT Marvelous.
- 2010–11 V.Premier League – Champion, with JT Marvelous.
- 2011 60th Kurowashiki All Japan Volleyball Tournament – Champion, with JT Marvelous.

=== National team ===
==== Senior team ====
- (Japan) 2008 – 1st AVC Women's Cup

==== Junior team ====
- 2006 Asian junior volleyball competition
- 2007 World junior volleyball competition
