= Tomomi Nakao =

Japanese volleyball player

Personal information
- Full name: Tomomi Nakao
- Nickname: Kai
- Born: November 27, 1981 (age 44) Miyakonojo, Miyazaki, Japan
- Height: 1.74 m (5 ft 9 in)
- Weight: 61 kg (134 lb)
- Spike: 282 cm (111 in)
- Block: 277 cm (109 in)

Volleyball information
- Position: Wing Spiker

National team
- Years: Team
- –: Japan

Tomomi Nakao (中尾 巴美 Nakao Tomomi, born 27 November 1981) is a former Japanese volleyball player who played for Ageo Medics.

== Profiles ==
- She played as the captain of Ageo Medics.

== Clubs ==
- NobeokaGakuen High School → Daiichi YoujiKyouiku College → Ageo Medics (2002–2009)

== National team ==
- (Japan) 2008 - 1st AVC Women's Cup
