= Yoshiko Yano =

Japanese volleyball player

Personal information
- Full name: Yoshiko Yano
- Nickname: Yoshi
- Born: August 1, 1985 (age 41) Kitamorokata District, Miyazaki; Miyazaki, Japan
- Height: 1.83 m (6 ft 0 in)
- Weight: 81 kg (179 lb)
- Spike: 304 cm (120 in)
- Block: 293 cm (115 in)

Volleyball information
- Position: Middle Blocker
- Current club: Toyota Auto Body Queenseis
- Number: 2

Yoshiko Yano (矢野美子 Yano Yoshiko, born August 1, 1985) is a Japanese volleyball player who plays for Toyota Auto Body Queenseis.

== Clubs ==
- Miyazaki Prefectural MiyakonojoShogyo High School
- Denso Airybees (2004-2012)
- Toyota Auto Body Queenseis (2012–present)

== Awards ==
=== Team ===
- 2008 2007-08 V.Premier League - Runner-up, with Denso.
- 2008 57th Kurowashiki All Japan Volleyball Tournament - Champion, with Denso.
- 2010 Empress's Cup - Champion, with Denso.
- 2014 63rd Kurowashiki All Japan Volleyball Tournament Champion, with Toyota Auto body.
