= Denso Airybees =

Japanese volleyball club

- Founded: 1972
- Ground: Kōriyama, Japan
- Head Coach: (Japan) Takeshi Tsuji
- Captain: (Japan) Haruna Kawabata
- League: SV.League
- 2025-26: 9th place
- Website: Club home page

Uniforms
Home	Away

Denso Airybees (デンソー・エアリービーズ, Densō Earībīzu) is a women's volleyball team based in Kōriyama, Japan. It plays in SV.League. The club was founded in 1972.

The owner of the team is Denso.

== Honours ==
Japan Volleyball League/V.League/V.Premier League

- Runners-up (1): 2007-2008

Business League/V1 League/V.Challenge League/V.Challenge League I/V.League Division 2

- Champion (2): 2013-14, 2016-17

Japan V.League Division 1 V.Cup

- Champion (1): 2024

Kurowashiki All Japan Volleyball Championship

- Champion (2): 2008, 2017
- Runners-up (1): 2024

Empress's Cup

- Champion (1): 2010
- Runners-up (2): 2009, 2017

== League results ==
League		Position	Teams	Matches	Win	Lose
Japan League	20th (1986–87)	6th	8	21	6	15
Japan League	21st (1987–88)	6th	8	14	5	9
Japan League	22nd (1988–89)	7th	8	14	3	11
V・League	1st (1994–95)	7th	8	21	10	11
V・League	3rd (1996–97)	3rd	8	21	11	10
V・League	4th (1997–98)	5th	8	21	9	12
V・League	5th (1998–99)	4th	10	18	14	4
V・League	6th (1999-2000)	6th	10	18	10	8
V・League	7th (2000–01)	9th	10	18	4	14
V・League	8th (2001–02)	8th	9	16	4	12
V・League	9th (2002–03)	7th	8	21	7	14
V・League	10th (2003–04)	9th	10	18	6	12
V・League	11th (2004–05)	3rd	10	27	15	12
V・League	12th (2005–06)	9th	10	27	5	22
V・Premier	2006-07	7th	10	27	11	16
V・Premier	2007-08	Runner-up	10	27	20	7
V・Premier	2008-09	4th	10	27	16	11
V・Premier	2009-10	3rd	8	28	15	13
V・Premier	2010-11	6th	8	26	12	14
V・Premier	2011-12	3rd	8	21	14	7
V・Premier	2012-13	7th	8	28	7	21
V・Challenge League	2013-14	Champion	10	18	17	1
V・Premier	2014-15	7th	8	21	6	15
V・Premier	2015-16	7th	8	21	8	13
V・Challenge League	2016-17	Champion	8	21	19	2
V・Premier	2017-18	4th	8	21	11	10
V.League Division 1 (V1)	2018–19	5th	11	20	10	10
V.League Division 1 (V1)	2019-20	4th	12	21	18	3
V.League Division 1 (V1)	2020-21	4th	12	19	12	7
V.League Division 1 (V1)	2021-22	6th	12	33	20	13
V.League Division 1 (V1)	2022-23	6th	12	33	14	19
V.League Division 1 (V1)	2023-24	5th	12	24	13	11
SV.League	2024–25	4th	14	44	29	15
SV.League	2025-26	9th	14	44	22	22

== Players ==
=== Current squad ===
2026/27 Squad for the SV.League

- Head coach: (Brazil) Henrique Modenesi

Denso Airybees
Number	Player	Position	Date of Birth	Height	Weight	Spike	Block
1	(Japan) Haruna Yamashita	Outside Hitter	21 April 2000 (age 26)	1.71 m (5 ft 7 in)	63 kg (139 lb)	285	
3	(Philippines) Thea Allison Gagate	Middle Blocker	26 July 2000 (age 26)	1.88 m (6 ft 2 in)		324	
4	(Japan) Haruna Kawabata (C)	Libero	8 February 2001 (age 25)	1.63 m (5 ft 4 in)	58 kg (128 lb)	269	
6	(Japan) Hitomi Fukumoto	Libero	11 January 2000 (age 26)	1.62 m (5 ft 4 in)	55 kg (121 lb)	255	
7	(Brazil) Rosamaria Montibeller	Opposite Hitter	9 April 1994 (age 32)	1.85 m (6 ft 1 in)	76 kg (168 lb)	290	
8	(Japan) Minami Nakamoto	Outside Hitter	14 May 1997 (age 29)	1.77 m (5 ft 10 in)			
10	(Japan) Saki Ishikura	Outside Hitter	16 February 2002 (age 24)	1.74 m (5 ft 9 in)	65 kg (143 lb)	293	
11	(Colombia) Amanda Coneo	Outside Hitter	20 December 1996 (age 29)	1.77 m (5 ft 10 in)		314	
12	(Brazil) Roberta Ratzke	Setter	28 April 1990 (age 36)	1.85 m (6 ft 1 in)		290	
14	(Japan) Nonoka Yamazaki	Setter	9 September 1998 (age 28)	1.72 m (5 ft 8 in)			
15	(Japan) Chika Yanagi	Middle Blocker	6 April 2006 (age 20)	1.84 m (6 ft 0 in)			
16	(Japan) Yuki Noda	Outside Hitter	15 November 2004 (age 22)	1.77 m (5 ft 10 in)	63 kg (139 lb)	300	
17	(Japan) Yee Mon Myat	Outside Hitter	27 December 2006 (age 19)	1.76 m (5 ft 9 in)			
18	(Japan) Yuki Yamagami	Setter	6 March 1995 (age 31)	1.70 m (5 ft 7 in)	60 kg (130 lb)	295	
19	(Japan) Yusa Kawagishi	Setter	22 October 2006 (age 20)	1.58 m (5 ft 2 in)			
20	(Japan) Kanna Wada	Libero	19 July 2007 (age 19)	1.62 m (5 ft 4 in)		278	
22	(Japan) Kotomi Osaki	Middle Blocker	23 August 2000 (age 26)	1.80 m (5 ft 11 in)	71 kg (157 lb)	307	
25	(Japan) Kyoka Seto	Middle Blocker	21 December 1997 (age 28)	1.78 m (5 ft 10 in)	68 kg (150 lb)	298	

== Former players ==
Domestic players

Japan

- Furudate Ayumi (2003-2007)
- Sayaka Ishida (2003-2008)
- Tomoko Okano (2000-2009)
- Ayako Sana (2004-2009)
- Junko Takahashi (2005-2009)
- Mai Fukuda (2006-2009)
- Mai Uemura (2006-2009)
- Masami Yokoyama (2002-2010)
- Rika Seki (2006-2010)
- Maya Ohtsuki (2006-2010)
- Kyoko Katashita (2008-2010)
- Keiko Kuroha (2009-2010)
- Eri Hosoda (2003-2011)
- Tsubasa Honda (2008-2011)
- Shoko Ohmura (2008-2011)
- Yoshiko Yano (2004-2012)
- Yuka Sakurai (1993-2012)
- Nanami Inoue (2008-2014)
- Kaori Inoue (2001–2015)
- Yuko Sano (2014–2015)
- Risa Ishii (2009-2018)
- Mizuho Ishida (2015-2019)
- Nanaka Sakamoto (ja) (2014-2020)
- Yui Asahi (ja) (2016–2020)
- Asuka Nomura (2018-2020)
- Riho Ōtake (2012–2021) Transferred to Hisamitsu Springs
- Yurie Nabeya (2012–2021) Transferred to PFU BlueCats
- Kanami Tashiro (2019–2021)
- Mai Okumura (2019–2021)
- Kotoe Inoue (2019–2021) Transferred to NEC Red Rockets
- Rei Kudou (2015-2022)
- Haruka Sekiyama (2017-2022)
- Yuki Hyodo (2017-2023) Secretariat to Denso Airybees
- Momoko Ishibashi (2017-2023)
- Fumika Moriya (2019-2023) Academy Staff to Denso Airybees
- Tamaki Matsui (2019-2023) Transferred to Unilife Vôlei Maringá
- Airi Takahashi (2021-2023) Team Manager to Denso Airybees
- Minami Yakamoto (2016-2024)
- Mami Yokota (2019-2024) Transferred to Queenseis Kariya
- Sayaka Yokota (2021-2024) Transferred to Queenseis Kariya
- Satomi Fukudome (2019-2024) Transferred to Vero Volley Milano

Foreign players

Brazil

- Rosamaria Montibeller (2023-)

Colombia

- Amanda Coneo (2024-2025)

Croatia

- Barbara Jelic (1994-1999)
- Slavica Kuzmanić (1994-1996)
- Yelena Chebukina (1996-1997)
- Mia Jerkov (2014-2016)

Dominican Republic

- Kenia Moreta (2006-2007)
- Cindy Rondón (2007-2009)
- Lisvel Elisa Eve (2010-2011)
- Bethania de la Cruz (2011-2012)

Germany

- Christiane Fürst (2016-2018)

Italy

- Indre Sorokaite (2013-2014)

Netherlands

- Chaïne Staelens (2009-2010)

Philippines

- Julia Melissa Morado-De Guzman (2023-2025)
- Thea Allison Ravanera Gagate (2026–)

Serbia

- Ivana Nešović (2012-2013)

Thailand

- Jarasporn Bundasak (2021–2022)

Trinidad and Tobago

- Sinéad Jack (2018–2020)

Turkey

- Neriman Özsoy (2022-2023)

United States

- Kathryn Plummer (2020–2021)

Venezuela

- Roslandy Acosta (2021–2022)

Vietnam

- Trần Thị Thanh Thúy (2019–2020)

== Coaching staff ==
Head coach

- 2006 - ??? : Takeshi Tsuji
- 2017-2022 : Gen Kawakita

Advisory Coach

- 2023 - ??? : Antonio Marcos Lerbach

Team Manager

- 2023 - ??? : Airi Takahashi

Medical Trainer

- 2023 - ??? : Ayaka Miyazono

Front Manager

- 2023 - ??? : Jun Sato
