= Masami Taniguchi =

Japanese volleyball player

Personal information
- Full name: Masami Taniguchi
- Nickname: Natsu (from the Miyazaki citrus, Hyuganatsu)
- Born: September 17, 1976 (age 50); Miyazaki city, Miyazaki, Japan
- Height: 1.77 m (5 ft 10 in)
- Weight: 62 kg (137 lb)
- Spike: 302 cm (119 in)
- Block: 292 cm (115 in)

Volleyball information
- Position: Wing Spiker
- Current club: JT Marvelous
- Number: 2

National team
Japan (1999, 2009)

Masami Taniguchi (谷口雅美 Taniguchi Masami, born September 17, 1976) is a Japanese volleyball player who plays for JT Marvelous.

== Profiles ==
- She became a volleyball player at 10 years old.
- She served as the captain until 2006.
- In JT Marvelous, her nickname is "The Taicho" which means the commander.

== Clubs ==
- (Japan) Miyazaki Nichidai High School
- (Japan) Odakyu (1995–1999)
- (Japan) Hitachi (1999–2001)
- (Japan) JT Marvelous (2001-)

== Awards ==
=== Individual ===
- 2003 52nd Kurowashiki All Japan Volleyball Championship : Best 6
- 2004 53rd Kurowashiki All Japan Volleyball Championship : Excellent player award, Best 6
- 2007 2006-07 V.Premier League : Best 6
- 2008 57th Kurowashiki All Japan Volleyball Tournament : Excellent player award, Best 6

=== Team ===
- 2003 Kurowashiki All Japan Volleyball Championship - Runner-Up, with JT Marvelous.
- 2004 Kurowashiki All Japan Volleyball Championship - Runner-Up, with JT Marvelous.
- 2006-2007 V.Premier League - Runner-Up, with JT Marvelous.
- 2007 Kurowashiki All Japan Volleyball Championship - Runner-Up, with JT Marvelous.
- 2009-2010 V.Premier League - Runner-Up, with JT Marvelous.
- 2010 Kurowashiki All Japan Volleyball Tournament - Runner-Up, with JT Marvelous.
- 2010-11 V.Premier League - Champion, with JT Marvelous.
- 2011 Kurowashiki All Japan Volleyball Tournament - Champion, with JT Marvelous.

=== National team ===
==== Senior team ====
- Japan National team (1999 and 2009)

==== Junior team ====
- Japan Youth national team (1992)
- Japan Junior national team (1994-5)
