= Chiba Angel Cross =

Japanese volleyball club

- Founded: 2001
- Ground: Kashiwa City, Chiba; Japan
- Manager Head coach: (Japan) Kiyoshi Yoshizawa (Japan) Noriaki Mameda
- Captain: Ayana Ishikawa
- League: V.League Division 2
- 2020–21: 7th place
- Website: Club home page

Chiba Angel Cross (千葉エンゼルクロス, Chiba Enzeru Kurosu) is a women's volleyball team based in Kashiwa, Chiba, Japan. It plays in V.League Division 2. The club was founded in 2001. The owner of the team is Tensenkai Medical Corporation.

== History ==
- Founded in 2001
- Promoted to V.Challenge League in 2003
- Joined V.League Division 2 in 2018
- (May 1, 2020) Changed the name of the team to Chiba Angel Cross

== League results ==
League		Position	Teams	Matches	Win	Lose
V1.League	5th (2002–03)	8th	8	14	2	12
V1.League	6th (2003–04)	5th	7	12	5	7
V1.League	7th (2004–05)	7th	8	14	2	12
V1.League	8th (2005–06)	7th	8	14	2	12
V・challenge	2006-07	7th	8	14	2	12
V・challenge	2007-08	7th	8	14	2	12
V・challenge	2008-09	8th	10	18	4	14
V・challenge	2009-10	8th	12	16	8	8
V・challenge	2010-11	8th	12	18	6	12
V・challenge	2011-12	8th	12	22	6	16
V・challenge	2012-13	8th	10	18	6	12
V・challenge	2013-14	7th	10	18	7	11
V・challenge	2014-15	8th	10	18	7	11
V・challenge 1	2015-16	8th	8	21	3	18
V・challenge 1	2016-17	8th	8	18	2	19
V・challenge 2	2017-18	2nd	6	15	10	5
V.League Division 2	2018-19	7th	10	18	7	11
V.League Division 2	2019-20	7th	8	21	8	13
V.League Division 2	2020-21	7th	9	11	3	8
V.League Division 2	2021-22	5th	10	17	8	9

== Current squad ==
2021-2022 Squad, as of 14 January 2022

No.	Name	Position	Date of birth	Height (m)	Weight (kg)	Spike (cm)
2	(Japan) Miyu Okabe	Setter	10 April 1999 (age 26)	1.65 m (5 ft 5 in)	52 kg (115 lb)	270
3	(Japan) Yumeno Kuroda	Libero	22 June 1998 (age 27)	1.64 m (5 ft 5 in)	56 kg (123 lb)	266
4	(Japan) Ayana Ishikawa	Outside hitter	8 January 1995 (age 31)	1.70 m (5 ft 7 in)	63 kg (139 lb)	292
5	(Japan) Yukari Morita	Middle blocker	6 July 1997 (age 28)	1.71 m (5 ft 7 in)	64 kg (141 lb)	280
6	(Japan) Aya Kimishima	Middle blocker	21 September 1998 (age 27)	1.76 m (5 ft 9 in)	65 kg (143 lb)	280
8	(Japan) Minoru Morita	Outside hitter	30 May 1998 (age 27)	1.72 m (5 ft 8 in)	62 kg (137 lb)	282
9	(Japan) Mai Okamura	Setter	2 May 1996 (age 29)	1.67 m (5 ft 6 in)	60 kg (130 lb)	275
10	(Japan) Mutsuki Kanai	Middle blocker	21 September 2001 (age 24)	1.70 m (5 ft 7 in)	63 kg (139 lb)	275
11	(Japan) Yuka Sekine	Middle blocker	28 May 1997 (age 28)	1.75 m (5 ft 9 in)	65 kg (143 lb)	279
12	(Japan) Nami Yoshida	Outside hitter	23 June 1997 (age 28)	1.71 m (5 ft 7 in)	56 kg (123 lb)	290
14	(Japan) Kazuha Tsurugasaki	Libero	6 July 1992 (age 33)	1.70 m (5 ft 7 in)	54 kg (119 lb)	280
15	(Japan) Yuka Nakajima	Outside hitter	24 February 1998 (age 27)	1.68 m (5 ft 6 in)	63 kg (139 lb)	289
16	(Japan) Nene Nahara	Setter	10 February 2000 (age 26)	1.71 m (5 ft 7 in)	61 kg (134 lb)	292
19	(Japan) Kana Tsuruta	Outside hitter	7 January 1997 (age 29)	1.69 m (5 ft 7 in)	62 kg (137 lb)	285
21	(Japan) Minami Matsubara	Outside hitter	24 December 1996 (age 29)	1.69 m (5 ft 7 in)	61 kg (134 lb)	290

== Former players ==
- Akika Hattori
- Hideko Murakami
- Yumi Mizuguchi
- Chinatsu Tabei
- Yumeno Hashizume
- Yukie Inamasu
- Rieko Sato
- Nanae Yashi
- Chika Nakamoto
- Yukako Suzuki
- Naomi Yamamoto (2016–2020)
- Haruka Suzuki (2016–2020)
- Mai Jono (2017–2021)
- Shiori Kimura (2017–2021) Transferred to Veertien Mie volleyball club
