= Hitomi Shiode =

Japanese volleyball player (born 1999)

Personal information
- Full name: Hitomi Shiode
- Nationality: Japanese
- Born: 15 September 1999 (age 27) Ebetsu City, Hokkaido, Japan
- Height: 1.74 m (5 ft 9 in)
- Weight: 61 kg (134 lb)
- Spike: 276 cm (109 in)
- Block: 270 cm (106 in)

Volleyball information
- Position: Setter
- Current club: (Japan) Osaka Marvelous
- Number: 18 (national); 4 (club)

Career
- Years: Team
- 2015–2018 2018–2022 2022-present: (Japan) Sapporo Yamanote High School (Japan) Nippon Sport Science University (Japan) Osaka Marvelous

National team
- Years: Team
- 2018, 2025: Japan
Honours
Women's volleyball
Representing Japan
AVC Cup
Silver medal – second place	2018 Nakhon Ratchasima	Team

Hitomi Shiode (塩出 仁美, Shiode Hitomi; born 15 September 1999) is a Japanese professional volleyball player. She plays in the SV.League for Osaka Marvelous.

== Career ==
She enrolled in Nippon Sport Science University in 2018. In the same year, she was selected as a member of the Japan women's national volleyball team B for the AVC Cup, which was composed of young players. She participated in the tournament and contributed to the team's silver medal.

In 2021, as a fourth year student at NSSU, she contributed to the team's runner-up finish in the All Japan Intercollegiate Championship and also received the Fighting Spirit Award.

In December 2021, she was selected to join JT Marvelous (now Osaka Marvelous).

In 2025, she was registered as a member of Japan women's national volleyball team for the first time.

== Award ==
=== Individual ===
- 2021-22 All Japan Intercollegiate Championship - Fighting Spirit

=== University Team ===
- 2018-19 Kanto University Autumn League - - Runner-up, with NSSU
- 2018-19 Kanto University Spring League - - Runner-up, with NSSU
- 2020-21 Kanto University Autumn League - - Bronze Medal, with NSSU
- 2021-22 All Japan Intercollegiate Championship - - Runner-up, with NSSU
- 2021-22 Kanto University Autumn League - - Bronze Medal, with NSSU

=== Club Team ===
- 2021–22 V.League Division 1 Women's - - Runner-up, with JT Marvelous
- 2022-23 Empress' Cup All Japan Volleyball Championship - - Bronze Medal, with JT Marvelous
- 2023-24 Empress' Cup All Japan Volleyball Championship - - Bronze Medal, with JT Marvelous
- 2023-24 V.League Division 1 Women's - - Runner-up, with JT Marvelous
- 2024-25 Empress' Cup All Japan Volleyball Championship - - Bronze Medal, with Osaka Marvelous
- 2024-25 SV.League Women's - - Champion, with Osaka Marvelous
- 2024-25 Empress' Cup All Japan Volleyball Championship - - Champion, with Osaka Marvelous

=== National Team ===
- (Thailand) 2018 AVC Cup - - Runner-up
