= Nozomi Tsuchida =

Japanese volleyball player (born 1986)

Personal information
- Born: August 19, 1986 (age 40); Fussa, Tokyo, Japan
- Height: 1.67 m (5 ft 6 in)
- Weight: 59 kg (130 lb)
- Spike: 280 cm (110 in)
- Block: 275 cm (108 in)

Volleyball information
- Position: Wing Spiker
- Current club: Toray Arrows
- Number: 6

Nozomi Tsuchida (born 19 August 1986) is a Japanese female volleyball player. She is part of the Japan women's national volleyball team. She participated at the 2015 FIVB World Grand Prix. At the club level she played for Ageo Medics in 2015.
