= Tatiana Alves dos Santos =

Brazilian volleyball player (born 1978)

Personal information
- Full name: Tatiana Alves dos Santos
- Nickname: Tati
- Nationality: Brazil
- Born: June 19, 1978 (age 48); Belo Horizonte, Brazil
- Hometown: Belo Horizonte, Brazil
- Height: 1.83 m (6 ft 0 in)

Volleyball information
- Position: Outside hitter
- Current club: (Russia) Omsk
- Number: 10

Tatiana Alves dos Santos (born June 19, 1978) is a Brazilian volleyball player. She is 183 cm. She played for Blumenau (Furb), Lupo Nautico, Farça Olimpica, Zaon, sparta(Bh) Vassauras (RJ) in Brazil, Zarechie Odintsova in Russia, Beşiktaş J.K., Fenerbahçe Acıbadem and VakıfBank Güneş Sigorta in Turkey and JT Marvelous in Japan. Now, she currently plays for Omsk in Russia.
