= Mana Nishizaki =

Japanese volleyball player (born 2002)

Personal information
- Full name: Mana Nishizaki
- Nationality: Japanese
- Born: 1 May 2002 (age 24) Okazaki City, Aichi, Japan
- Height: 1.58 m (5 ft 2 in)
- Weight: 53 kg (117 lb)
- Spike: 265 cm (104 in)
- Block: 250 cm (98 in)

Volleyball information
- Position: Libero
- Current club: (Japan) Osaka Marvelous
- Number: 35 (national); 10 (club)

Career
- Years: Team
- 2018–2021 2021–present: (Japan) Kinrankai High School (Japan) Osaka Marvelous

National team
- Years: Team
- 2018–2019, 2025: Japan
Honours
Women's volleyball
Representing Japan
Cornacchia World Cup
Gold medal – first place	2019 Pordenone	Team
Asian U17 Championship
Gold medal – first place	2018 Nakhon Pathom	Team

Mana Nishizaki (西崎 愛菜, Nishizaki Mana; born 1 May 2002) is a Japanese professional volleyball player. She plays in the SV.League for Osaka Marvelous.

== Career ==
=== Early Years ===
In 2018, she was selected to represent Japan in the Asian U17 Championship in Thailand where the team won the championship.

In 2019, she was selected to represent Japan in the 2019 Cornacchia World Cup, a youth competitive volleyball tournament in Italy. The team won the gold medal in their first appearance at the tournament. She was awarded the Best Libero.

She was also selected for the 2019 U19 World Championship. The team finished in the 5th place after defeated by USA in quarterfinals.

=== Professional Years ===
On February 17, 2021, JT Marvelous announced that she would join the team.

Nishizaki was a setter when she entered Kinrankai Junior High School, and switched to libero in her second year of junior high school. In the 2021–22 season, her first season with JT Marvelous, she was used as a setter from the start of the season.

In 2025, she was selected as a member of the Japan women's national volleyball team for the first time.

== Award ==
=== Individual ===
- 2019 Cornacchia World Cup - Best Libero
- 2023 V.Summer League - Fighting Spirit

=== High School Team ===
- 2018-19 All Japan High School Championship - - Champion, with Kinrankai High School
- 2019-20 All Japan High School Championship - - Bronze Medal, with Kinrankai High School

=== Club Team ===
- 2020-21 Empress' Cup All Japan Volleyball Championship - - Champion, with JT Marvelous
- 2020-21 V.League Division 1 Women's - - Champion, with JT Marvelous
- 2021-22 V.League Division 1 Women's - - Runner-up, with JT Marvelous
- 2022-23 Empress' Cup All Japan Volleyball Championship - - Bronze Medal, with JT Marvelous
- 2023-24 Empress' Cup All Japan Volleyball Championship - - Bronze Medal, with JT Marvelous
- 2023-24 V.League Division 1 Women's - - Runner-up, with JT Marvelous
- 2024-25 Empress' Cup All Japan Volleyball Championship - - Bronze Medal, with Osaka Marvelous
- 2024-25 SV.League Women's - - Champion, with Osaka Marvelous
- 2025-26 Empress' Cup All Japan Volleyball Championship - - Champion, with Osaka Marvelous

=== National Team ===
- (Thailand) 2018 Asian U17 Championship - - Champion
- (Italy) 2019 Cornacchia World Cup - - Champion
