= Eri Hosoda =

Japanese volleyball player

Personal information
- Full name: Eri Hosoda
- Nickname: Eri
- Born: May 15, 1984 (age 42); Miwa, Aichi, Japan
- Height: 1.75 m (5 ft 9 in)
- Weight: 66 kg (146 lb)
- Spike: 287 cm (113 in)
- Block: 279 cm (110 in)

Volleyball information
- Position: Wing Spiker
- Current club: Denso Airybees
- Number: 4

Eri Hosoda (細田絵理 Hosoda Eri, born May 15, 1984) is a Japanese volleyball player who played for Denso Airybees.

== Clubs ==
- Okazaki Gakuen High School → Denso Airybees (2003-2011)

== Honors ==
- Team
  - Japan Volleyball League/V.League/V.Premier
    Runners-up (1): 2007-2008
  - Kurowashiki All Japan Volleyball Championship
    Champions (1): 2008
