= Nanami Inoue =

Japanese volleyball player

Personal information
- Full name: Nanami Inoue
- Nickname: Nana
- Born: June 19, 1989 (age 37) Fuchu, Tokyo, Japan
- Height: 1.78 m (5 ft 10 in)
- Weight: 64 kg (141 lb)
- Spike: 305 cm (120 in)
- Block: 286 cm (113 in)

Volleyball information
- Position: Middle Blocker
- Current club: Saitama Ageo Medics
- Number: 23

Nanami Inoue (井上 奈々朱 Inoue Nanami, born 19 June 1989) is a Japanese volleyball player who plays for Saitama Ageo Medics.

== Clubs ==
- Shimokitazawa Seitoku High School → Denso Airybees (2008-2014) → Shikoku Eighty 8 Queen (Rental transferring for register: 2008-2009) → Hitachi Rivale (2014-2017) → Toray Arrows (2017-2024) → Saitama Ageo Medics (2024-)

== National team ==
- (Japan) 2008 - 1st AVC Women's Cup

== Awards ==
=== Individuals ===
- 1st AVC Women's Cup : Best Server award

=== Team ===
- 2008 57th Kurowashiki All Japan Volleyball Championship - Champion, with Denso.
- 2010 Empress's Cup - Champion, with Denso.
