= Ivana Nešović =

Serbian volleyball player

Ivana Nešović Ивана Нешовић
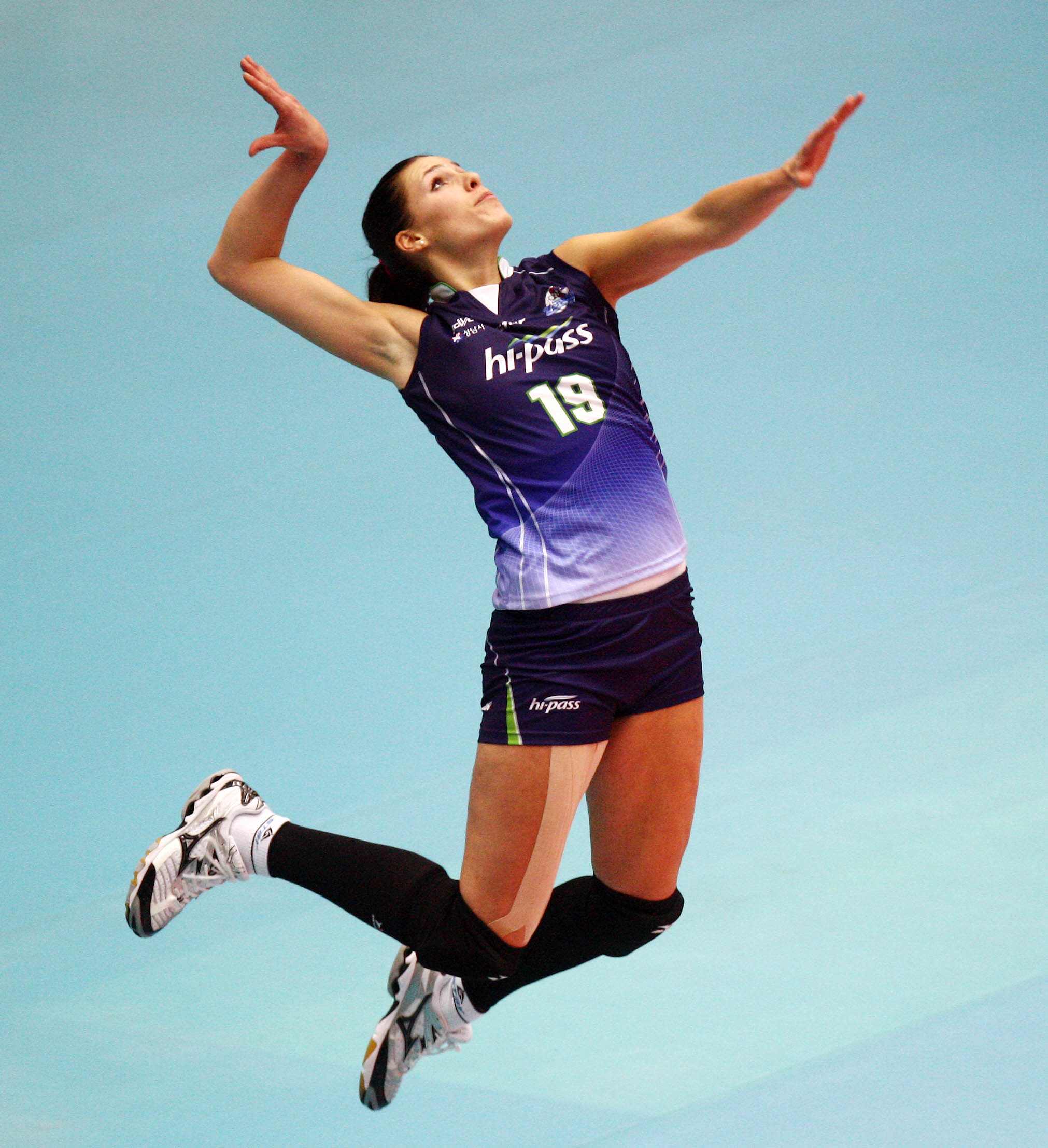

Personal information
- Full name: Ivana Nešović
- Nationality: Serbia
- Born: 23 July 1988 (age 38); Belgrade, SFR Yugoslavia
- Height: 1.90 m (6 ft 3 in)

Volleyball information
- Position: Opposite

Career
Years	Teams
2003-2010; 2010-2011; 2011-2012; 2012-2012; 2012-2013; 2013-2014; 2014; 2014; 2015-2017; 2017-2018	Red Star; Asystel Novara; Volley Soverato; KEC Hi-pass; Denso Airybees; Canakkale Belediyespor; Železničar Lajkovac; Tianjin Bohai Bank; Olympiacos; KEC Hi-pass

National team
Serbia

Ivana Nešović (Serbian Cyrillic: Ивана Нешовић; born 23 July 1988) is a volleyball player from Serbia, playing as an opposite for South Korean club Gyeongbuk Gimcheon Hi-pass and the Serbia women's national volleyball team.

== Career ==
Her professional career started in 2003 in Red Star, and in the same season the club won the national championship. During her stay in Red Star for three years she was a captain and was named as the most talented young player. Nešović was a member of the Red Star until 2010, when after a successful season she signed a contract with Italian club Asystel Novara.

In the 2010/11 season she played for Asystel, and played the next season for Soverato from Southern Italy. After the half-season in South Korean club Seongnam KEC Hi-pass, Nešović signed a contract with Japanese team Denso Airybees.

On 19 September 2012, Denso Airybees announced her joining.

On January 15 2015, Nešović signed with Olympiacos.

== Trophies ==
- National Championship of Serbia and Montenegro (2003/2004)
- National Championship of Serbia (2009/2010)
- Serbia Cup (2010)
- Greek Women's Volleyball Cup (2015)

== Individual awards ==
- 2008 - Best player of National Championship in October
- 2012 - Best player in South Korea in February
