= Osaka Marvelous =

Japanese women's volleyball team

- Founded: 1956
- Ground: Nishinomiya, Hyogo; Japan
- Manager Head coach: (Japan) Hiroyuki Tohma (Japan) Daisuke Sakai
- Captain: (Japan) Hitomi Shiode
- League: SV.League
- 2025-26: Runners-up
- Website: Club home page

Uniforms
Home	Away

Osaka Marvelous (大阪マーヴェラス, Ōsaka Māvuerasu), formerly the JT Marvelous (JTマーヴェラス, JT Māvuerasu), is a women's volleyball team owned by Japan Tobacco Ltd., and based in Nishinomiya, Hyogo, Japan.

== History ==
Osaka Marvelous was established in 1956.

== Honours ==
=== Domestic competitions ===
Japan Volleyball League/V.League/V.Premier League/V.LEAGUE Division 1

- Champion (3): 2010-11, 2019-20, 2020-21
- Runners-up (5): 2006-07, 2009–10, 2017–18, 2021-22, 2023-24

Business League/V1 League/V.Challenge League/V.Challenge League I/V.LEAGUE Division 2

- Champion (4): 1998–99, 2002–03, 2014–15, 2015–16
- Runners-up (1): 1995–96

Kurowashiki All Japan Volleyball Championship

- Champion (5): 2011, 2012, 2015, 2016, 2018
- Runners-up (5): 2003, 2004, 2007, 2008, 2010

Empress's Cup

- Champion (1): 2020, 2025

SV.League

- Champion (1): 2024-25
- Runners-up (1): 2025-26

=== International competitions ===
- Asian Championship 1 appearance
  - 2010 — Third place

== League results ==
League		Position	Teams	Matches	Win	Lose
V.League (V・Premier)	3rd (1996–97)	8th	8	21	1	20
V.League (V・Premier)	6th (2000–01)	7th	10	18	6	12
V.League (V・Premier)	7th (2000–01)	8th	10	18	6	12
V.League (V・Premier)	8th (2001–02)	9th	9	16	2	14
V.League (V・Premier)	10th (2003–04)	7th	10	18	6	12
V.League (V・Premier)	11th (2004–05)	4th	10	27	15	12
V.League (V・Premier)	12th (2005–06)	7th	10	27	12	15
V・Premier	2006-07	Runner-up	10	27	20	7
V・Premier	2007-08	8th	10	27	12	15
V・Premier	2008-09	9th	10	27	10	17
V・Premier	2009-10	Runner-up	8	28	26	2
V・Premier	2010-11	Champion	8	26	20	6
V・Premier	2011-12	5th	8	21	11	10
V・Premier	2012-13	6th	8	28	9	19
V・Premier	2013-14	7th	8	28	12	16
V・Challenge	2014-15	Champion	10	18	17	1
V・Challenge 1	2015-16	Champion	8	21	21	0
V・Premier	2016-17	4th	8	21	13	8
V・Premier	2017–18	Runner-up	8	21	13	8
V.League Division 1 (V1)	2018–19	3rd	11	20	14	6
V.League Division 1 (V1)	2019-20	Champion	12	21	17	4
V.League Division 1 (V1)	2020-21	Champion	12	20	16	4
V.League Division 1 (V1)	2021-22	Runner-up	12	34	27	7
V.League Division 1 (V1)	2022-23	5th	12	33	23	10
V.League Division 1 (V1)	2023-24	Runner-up	12	24	23	1
SV.League	2024-25	Champion	14	44	37	7
SV.League	2025-26	Runner-up	14	44	30	14

== Current squad ==
2026/27 Squad as of November 2026

Head coach: (Japan) Sakai Daisuke

No.	Name	Position	Date of birth	Height (m)
1	(Japan) Kyoko Aoyagi	Middle Blocker	16 December 1991 (age 34)	1.82 m (6 ft 0 in)
2	(Japan) Kotona Hayashi	Outside Hitter	13 November 1999 (age 27)	1.73 m (5 ft 8 in)
3	(Japan) Airi Furukawa	Opposite Hitter	7 April 2004 (age 22)	1.84 m (6 ft 0 in)
4	(Japan) Hitomi Shiode (c)	Setter	15 September 1999 (age 27)	1.74 m (5 ft 9 in)
5	(Japan) Momoka Naruse	Middle Blocker	10 May 2004 (age 22)	1.79 m (5 ft 10 in)
6	(Japan) Mizuki Tanaka	Outside Hitter	28 January 1996 (age 30)	1.70 m (5 ft 7 in)
7	(Japan) Mina Higashi	Setter	4 March 2000 (age 26)	1.60 m (5 ft 3 in)
8	(Japan) Haruka Oyama	Middle Blocker	5 May 2001 (age 25)	1.77 m (5 ft 10 in)
9	(United States) Brionne Butler	Middle Blocker	29 January 1999 (age 27)	1.95 m (6 ft 5 in)
10	(Japan) Mana Nishizaki	Libero	1 May 2002 (age 24)	1.58 m (5 ft 2 in)
11	(Japan) Yuka Meguro	Outside Hitter	6 January 1996 (age 30)	1.70 m (5 ft 7 in)
12	(Germany) Hanna Orthmann	Opposite Hitter	3 October 1998 (age 28)	1.88 m (6 ft 2 in)
14	(Japan) Nanase Akahoshi	Setter	7 January 1995 (age 31)	1.75 m (5 ft 9 in)
15	(Brazil) Glayce Vasconcelos	Outside Hitter	28 January 1998 (age 28)	1.88 m (6 ft 2 in)
17	(Japan) Koyumi Fukumura	Outside Hitter	29 June 2006 (age 20)	1.78 m (5 ft 10 in)
18	(Japan) Nanami Tokumoto	Outside Hitter	7 July 2007 (age 19)	1.72 m (5 ft 8 in)

== Notable players ==
Domestic players

Japan

- Naomi Eto
- Junko Moriyama
- Chikako Kumamae
- Kaoru Sugayama
- Makiko Horai
- Seiko Kawamura
- Rie Takaki (2003–2011)
- Yuki Kawai (2008–2011)
- Chihiro Kato
- Yoshie Takeshita (2002–2012)
- Masami Taniguchi
- Ai Yamamoto/Ai Ōtomo (2009–2013)
- Keiki Nishiyama
- Yuki Ishikawa
- Naoko Hashimoto
- Mai Okumura (ja) (2012–2018)
- Megumi Kurihara (2018-2019)
- Misaki Tanaka (2013–2020)
- Anna Ogawa (2013–2021)
- Jaja Santiago (Note: Jaja Santiago prior to August 2024, Sachi Minowa since then after she acquired Japanese citizenship) (2024–)

Foreign players

Brazil

- Tatiana Alves Dos Santos (2008–2009)

Bulgaria

- Eva Yaneva (2012–2013)

Colombia

- Kenny Moreno Pino (2006–2008)

Serbia

- Jovana Brakočević (2011–2012)
- Brankica Mihajlović (2017–2019)

South Korea

- Yeon-Koung Kim (2009–2011)

Thailand

- Onuma Sittirak (2014–2017)
- Kaewkalaya Kamulthala (2018–2020)
- Thatdao Nuekjang (2020-2023)

Turkey

- Dilara Bilge (2013–2014)

United States

- Annie Drews (2019–2022, 2023-2024)
- Karsta Lowe (2019–2022)

Philippines

- Jaja Santiago (2023–2024)
- Alyssa Solomon (2025–)
