= Brionne Butler =

American volleyball player (born 1999)

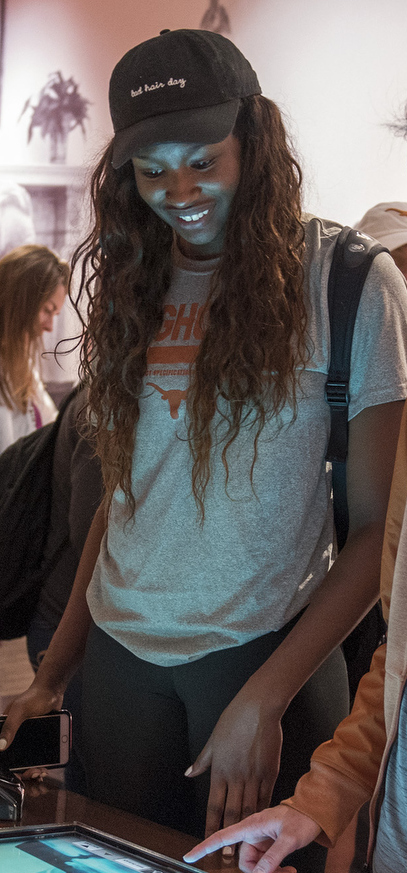

Personal information
- Full name: Brionne Kierra Butler
- Nationality: United States
- Born: January 29, 1999 (age 27) Louisiana, U.S.
- Home town: Kendleton, Texas, U.S.
- Education: Texas
- Height: 6 ft 4 in (1.94 m)
- Weight: 172 lb (78 kg)
- Spike: 128 in (325 cm)
- Block: 125 in (318 cm)

Volleyball information
- Position: Middle Blocker
- Current club: (Japan) Osaka Marvelous

Career
- Years: Team
- 2021–2022: (Indonesia) Gresik Petrokimia
- 2022–2023: (Italy) Chieri
- 2023–2024: (Brazil) Osasco
- 2024–2026: (Japan) Astemo Rivale
- 2026–: (Japan) Osaka Marvelous

National team
- Years: Team
- 2019–: United States
Medal record
Indoor Volleyball
Representing the United States
Pan-American Cup
| Gold medal – first place | 2019 Trujillo/Chiclayo |
| Bronze medal – third place | 2022 Hermosillo |

Brionne Kierra Butler (born January 29, 1999) is an American professional volleyball player who plays as a middle blocker for the United States national team and Japanese SV.League club Osaka Marvelous.

== Early life ==
Butler was born in Louisiana to Brian Butler and Javonne Brooks and grew up in Kendleton, Texas. Her mother played volleyball for University of New Orleans and holds 2nd place in the NCAA record books for career kills.

She attended high school at Boling High School, and was the #2 nationally ranked recruit in her graduating class. At the end of her sophomore year, she committed to the University of Texas at Austin and sat out the rest of her UIL eligibility. While in high school, she was on the Junior USA national team.

== Career ==
=== College ===
After redshirting her freshman season in 2017, Butler played as a starting middle blocker the remaining three years of her collegiate career, earning First Team All-American honors her senior year. In her senior season in 2020, she led the NCAA in total blocks. She helped Texas to a national runner-up finish at the 2020 NCAA tournament, and was named to the NCAA Final Four All-Tournament Team. Additionally, she helped Texas to Big 12 Conference titles every year she was on the team.

=== Professional clubs ===
- (Indonesia) Gresik Petrokimia (2021–2022)
- (Italy) Chieri (2022–2023)
- (Brazil) Osasco Voleibol Clube (2023–2024)
- (Japan) Astemo Rivale Ibaraki (2024–2026)
- (Japan) Osaka Marvelous (2026–)

=== U.S. National Team ===
While still in college, Butler made her U.S. national team debut at the 2019 Women's Pan-American Volleyball Cup, earning a gold medal with the team.

In May 2022, Butler was named to the 25-player roster for the 2022 FIVB Volleyball Nations League tournament.

== Awards and honors ==
=== Clubs ===
- 2022 Indonesian Proliga – Silver medal, with Gresik Petrokimia.

=== International ===
- 2022 Pan-American Cup, Bronze Medal with the U.S. National Team.
- 2019 Pan-American Cup, Gold Medal with the U.S. National Team.

=== College ===
- AVCA First Team All-American (2020)
- All-Big 12 First Team (2018, 2019, 2020)
- Volleyball Magazine Second Team All-American (2019)
