= Martin Nemec (volleyball) =

Slovak volleyball player (born 1984)

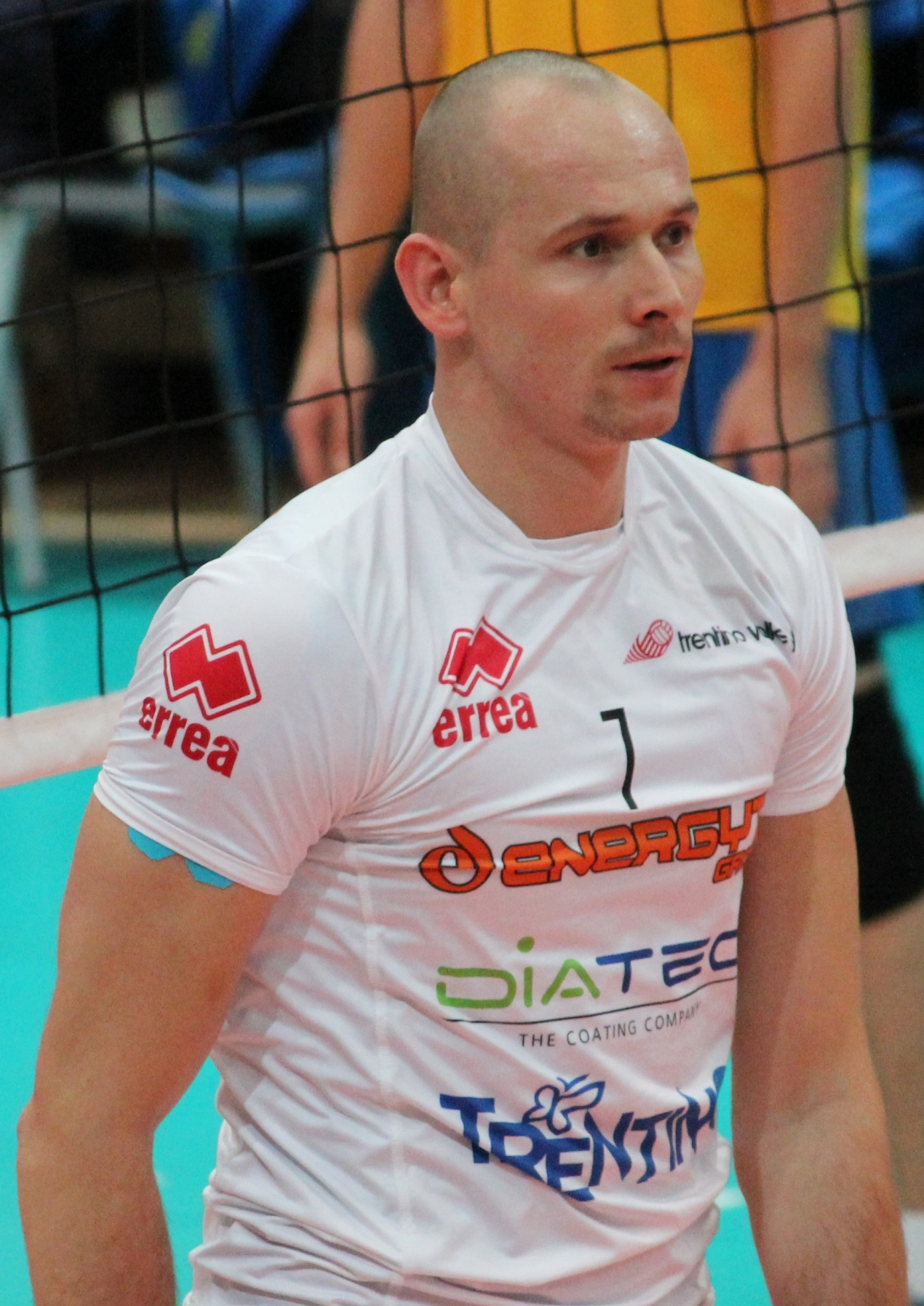

Personal information
- Nationality: Slovak
- Born: 31 July 1984 (age 42)

Volleyball information

National team
- Years: Team
- –: Slovakia

Martin Nemec (born 31 July 1984) is a retired Slovak male volleyball player.

== Clubs ==
- VKP Bratislava (1998–2006)
- Rennes Volley (2006–2007)
- Ziraat Bankası Ankara (2007–2008)
- Perugia Volley (2008–2010)
- PV Città di Castello (2010–2011)
- Incheon Korean Air Jumbos (2011–2013)
- Police Doha (2013)
- C.V.M. Tomis Constanța (2013–2014)
- Trentino Volley (2014–2015)
- Gumi KB Insurance Stars (2015–2016)
- Beşiktaş JK (2016–2017)
- Palembang Bank Sumsel Babel (2017-Present)
