= Chihiro Kato (volleyball) =

Japanese volleyball player (born 1988)

Personal information
- Full name: Chihiro Kato
- Nickname: Chi
- Born: 22 November 1988 (age 37); Fujisawa, Kanagawa, Japan
- Height: 1.78 m (5 ft 10 in)
- Weight: 61 kg (134 lb)
- Spike: 302 cm (119 in)
- Block: 285 cm (112 in)

Volleyball information
- Position: Middle Blocker
- Current club: JT Marvelous
- Number: 17

Chihiro Kato (加藤 千尋 Kato Chihiro, born 22 November 1988) is a Japanese volleyball player who plays for JT Marvelous.

== Profile ==
- She became a volleyball player at nine years old.

== Clubs ==
- Kanagawa Prefectural Yamatominami High School → JT Marvelous (2007-)

== Awards ==
=== Team ===
- 2009-2010 V.Premier League - Runner-Up, with JT Marvelous.
- 2010 59th Kurowashiki All Japan Volleyball Tournament - Runner-Up, with JT Marvelous.
- 2010-11 V.Premier League - Champion, with JT Marvelous.
- 2011 60th Kurowashiki All Japan Volleyball Tournament - Champion, with JT Marvelous.

== National team ==
- (Japan) 2005 Youth national team Asian youth volleyball competition
- (Japan) 2006-2007 Junior national team - Asian junior volleyball competition (2006), World junior volleyball competition (2007)
- (Japan) 2008 - 1st AVC Women's Cup
