= Kotona Hayashi =

Japanese volleyball player (born 1999)

Personal information
- Full name: Kotona Hayashi
- Nationality: Japanese
- Born: 13 November 1999 (age 27) Kyoto, Japan
- Height: 1.73 m (5 ft 8 in)
- Weight: 62 kg (137 lb)
- Spike: 292 cm (115 in)
- Block: 280 cm (110 in)

Volleyball information
- Position: Wing spiker
- Current club: (Japan) JT Marvelous
- Number: 15 (national); 2 (club)

Career
- Years: Team
- 2015: U-19 national team
- 2018: U-21 national team
- 2020–present: Senior national team

National team
- Years: Team
- 2020–present: Japan
Honours
Women's Volleyball
Representing Japan
FIVB Nations League
Silver medal – second place	2024 Bangkok	Team

Kotona Hayashi (林琴奈, Hayashi Kotona; born 13 November 1999) is a Japanese volleyball player. She plays for the Japan women's national volleyball team. She competed at the 2020 Summer Olympics, in Women's volleyball.

== Career ==
She participated in the 2015 FIVB Volleyball Girls' U18 World Championship, 2018 Asian Women's Volleyball Cup and 2021 FIVB Volleyball Women's Nations League.

She plays for JT Marvelous, who placed first in the 2019–20 V.League Division 1 Women's.
