= V.Challenge League =

Japanese volleyball league

V.League Division 2 and 3
- Current season, competition or edition: 2021–22 V.Challenge League
- Sport: Volleyball
- Founded: 1994
- Motto: We Never Drop the Ball
- No. of teams: Men: V2:15, V3:4; Women: V2:10
- Country: Japan
- Most recent champions: Men V2: Voreas Hokkaido; Women V2: Gunma Bank Green Wings; Men V3: Aisin Tealmare; (2021–22)
- Related competitions: V.League Division 1
- Website: https://www.vleague.jp

V.League Division 2 (V2) and V.League Division 3 (V3) are the second- and third-level volleyball leagues for both men and women in Japan. For women tournament, was only held in Division 2

== History ==
The league started in 1998 as V1 League. In 2006 the name of V1.League was changed in the V.Challenge League. The Champion and runner-up team could play the replacement game with lower place teams of V.premier League.

On 2 February 2014 Japan Volleyball League Organization announced that:

1. V.Challenge League will be divided into V.Challenge League 1 and V.Challenge League 2 from next season.
2. V.Challenge League 1 include higher 8 teams in the 2014–15 season.
3. V.Challenge League 2 include lower teams in the 2014–15 season.
4. Associate teams of JVL will play in the V.Challenge League 2.
5. Bottom team of V.Challenge League 1 and top team of V.Challenge League 2 will compete a Promotion and relegation match except associate teams.

In 2018–2019 season, V.League (Japan) was reorganized and renamed with V.League Division 2 replacing V.Challenge League 1 and V.League Division 3 replacing V.Challenge League 2.

== V.League Division 2 ==
=== Men ===
Season 2022/23(10 clubs)

Club	Location	2022–23 Final Ranking
Voreas Hokkaido	Asahikawa	Champions
Fujitsu Kawasaki Red Spirits	Kawasaki	
Veertien MIE	Yokkaichi	
Saitama Azalea	Saitama	
Safilva Hokkaido	Sapporo	
Daido Steel Red Star	Nagoya	
Hyogo Delfino	Hyogo	
Kinden Trinity Blitz	Osaka	
Tsukuba United Sun Gaia	Tsukuba	
Aisin Tealmare	Hekinan	

=== Previous results ===
Season 2021–22 (15 clubs)

Club	Location	2021–22 Final Ranking
Voreas Hokkaido	Asahikawa	Champion
Fujitsu Kawasaki Red Spirits	Kawasaki	Runner-up
Veertien MIE	Yokkaichi	3rd place
Saitama Azalea	Saitama	4th place
Safilva Hokkaido	Sapporo	5th place
Daido Steel Red Star	Nagoya	6th place
Hyogo Delfino	Hyogo	7th place
Kinden Trinity Blitz	Osaka	8th place
Tsukuba United Sun Gaia	Tsukuba	9th place
Toyota Sunhawks	Toyota, Aichi	10th place
Nara Dreamers	Nara	11th place
Tokyo Metropolitan Police Department Fort Fighters	Shinjuku	12th place
Tokyo Verdy Volleyball Team	Inagi	13th place
KUBOTA Spears	Osaka	14th place
Chiba ZELVA	Chiba	15th place

==== Women ====
Season 2022/23(11 clubs)

Club	Location	2022–23 Final Ranking
Route Inn Hotels Brilliant Aries	Ueda	
Gunma Bank Green Wings	Maebashi	
Prestige International Aranmare Yamagata	Sakata	Champions
GSS Tokyo SunBeams	Tokyo / Annaka	
Chiba Angel Cross	Kashiwa	
Ligare Sendai	Sendai	
Breath Hamamatsu	Hamamatsu	
Ohno Group Hiroshima Oilers	Hiroshima	
JA Gifu Rioreina	Gifu	
Forest Leaves Kumamoto	Kumamoto	
Veertien Mie	Kuwana, Mie	

=== Previous results ===
Season 2021–22 (10 clubs)

Club	Location	2021–22 Final Ranking
Route Inn Hotels Brilliant Aries	Ueda	Champion
Gunma Bank Green Wings	Maebashi	Runner-up
Prestige International Aranmare Yamagata	Sakata	3rd place
GSS Tokyo SunBeams	Tokyo / Annaka	4th place
Chiba Angel Cross	Kashiwa	5th place
Ligare Sendai	Sendai	6th place
Breath Hamamatsu	Hamamatsu	7th place
Ohno Group Hiroshima Oilers	Hiroshima	8th place
JA Gifu Rioreina	Gifu	9th place
Forest Leaves Kumamoto	Kumamoto	10th place

=== Season winners ===
Season	Men		Women	
Season	Champion	Runner-up	Champion	Runner-up
2018–19	Fujitsu Kawasaki Red Spirits	Toyota Sunhawks	Victorina Himeji	JA Gifu Rioreina
2019–20	Fujitsu Kawasaki Red Spirits	Voreas Hokkaido	Gunma Bank Green Wings	GSS Tokyo SunBeams
2020–21	Fujitsu Kawasaki Red Spirits	Voreas Hokkaido	Gunma Bank Green Wings	Route Inn Hotels Brilliant Aries
2021–22	Voreas Hokkaido	Fujitsu Kawasaki Red Spirits	Route Inn Hotels Brilliant Aries	Gunma Bank Green Wings

== V.League Division 3 ==
V.League Division 3 is held only men's tournament

=== Current clubs and results ===
This is the men's clubs roster in 2021–22 season (4 clubs)

Club	Location	2021–22 Final Ranking
Aisin Tealmare	Hekinan	Champion
Kinki Club Sfida	Higashiōsaka	Runner-up
Nagano GaRons	Nagano / Suzaka	3rd place
Toyota Mobility Tokyo Sparkle	Minato, Tokyo	4th place

=== Previous winners ===
Season	Champion	Runner-up
2018–19	Voreasu Hokkaido	Veertien MIE
2019–20	Nara Dreamers	Kinki Club Sfida
2020–21	Kinki Club Sfida	Chiba ZELVA
2021–22	Aisin Tealmare	Kinki Club Sfida

== See also ==
- V.League Division 1
