= 2025–26 SV.League Women's =

Japanese volleyball league

- Sport: Volleyball
- Duration: October 10, 2025 — April 27, 2026
- Teams: 14
- League champions: Saga Hisamitsu Springs
- Runners-up: Osaka Marvelous
- Finals venue: Yokohama Buntai, Kanagawa

Seasons
- 2024-25 2026–27

The 2025–26 SV.League Women's is the second tournament of the SV.League which scheduled from October 10, 2025 to April 27, 2026.

Saga Hisamitsu Springs beats Osaka Marvelous with straight set in final match to claim their first championship title. Minami Nishimura was named the Championship MVP while Yoshino Sato was awarded Regular Season MVP.

== Clubs ==
2024–25 SV.League Women's
Club	Head Coach	Captain	City, Prefecture	Colors	Affiliation
Aranmare Yamagata	(Japan) Kou Ozaki	(Japan) Yuri Kimura	Sakata, Yamagata		Prestige International
Denso Airybees	(Japan) Takeshi Tsuji	(Japan) Haruna Kawabata	Koriyama, Fukushima; Nishio, Aichi		Denso
Astemo Rivale Ibaraki	(Japan) Aihara Noboru	(Japan) Miwako Osanai	Hitachinaka, Ibaraki		Hitachi
Gunma Green Wings	(Japan) Masayasu Sakamoto	(Japan) Minami Takaso	Maebashi, Gunma		Gunma Bank
Saitama Ageo Medics	(Japan) Shigekazu Okubo	(Japan) Mami Uchiseto	Ageo, Saitama		Ageo Medical Group
NEC Red Rockets Kawasaki	(Japan) Kodai Nakaya	(Japan) Nichika Yamada	Kawasaki, Kanagawa		NEC
Kurobe AquaFairies	(Japan) Gen Kawakita	(Japan) Anri Nakamura	Kurobe, Toyama		Kurobe City Athletic Association
PFU BlueCats Ishikawa Kahoku	(Japan) Baba Daitaku	(Japan) Aya Hosonuma	Kahoku, Ishikawa		PFU Limited
Queenseis Kariya	(Japan) Shingo Sakai	(Japan) Hinata Shigihara	Kariya, Aichi		Toyota Auto Body
Toray Arrows Shiga	(Japan) Hitomi Nakamichi	(Japan) Tsugumi Fukazawa	Ōtsu, Shiga		Toray Industries
Osaka Marvelous	(Japan) Daisuke Sakai	(Japan) Mizuki Tanaka	Osaka		Japan Tobacco Ltd.
Victorina Himeji	(Netherlands) Avital Selinger	(Japan) Chihiro Sasaki	Himeji, Hyōgo		Himeji Victorina Co., Ltd.
Okayama Seagulls	(Japan) Akiyoshi Kawamoto	(Japan) Sora Nagase	Okayama		Okayama Seagulls Co., Ltd.
Saga Hisamitsu Springs	(Japan) Kumi Nakada	(Japan) Erika Sakae	Tosu, Saga		Hisamitsu Pharmaceutical

Source: SV.League - Team List

== Transfer Players ==
2024–25 SV.League Women's Inbound Transfers
Player	Coming from	Coming to	Ref.
(Japan) Shuna Omoto	(Mongolia) Kashkhan	(Japan) Aranmare Yamagata	
(Japan) Kaho Wakazumi	(Japan) Breath Hamamatsu	(Japan) Aranmare Yamagata	
(Thailand) Ajcharaporn Kongyot	(Japan) NEC Red Rockets Kawasaki	(Japan) Aranmare Yamagata	
(Thailand) Wimonrat Thanapan	(Japan) Gunma Green Wings	(Japan) Aranmare Yamagata	
(Japan) Yuna Tokunaga	(Japan) Osaka University of Health and Sport Sciences	(Japan) Aranmare Yamagata	
(Japan) Haruka Sawada	(Japan) Aichi Gakuin University	(Japan) Aranmare Yamagata	
(Japan) Saki Matsumoto	(Japan) Nihon Wellness High School Ibaraki	(Japan) Aranmare Yamagata	
(Japan) Miyu Niigata	(Japan) Nihon Wellness High School Ibaraki	(Japan) Aranmare Yamagata	
(Japan) Kokoro Ozaki	(Japan) Shinwa Girls High School	(Japan) Aranmare Yamagata	
(China) Qiushuang Du	(China) Liaoning Donggang Strawberry Alliance	(Japan) Aranmare Yamagata	
(Japan) Nonoka Yamazaki	(Japan) Saitama Ageo Medics	(Japan) Denso Airybees	
(Brazil) Sabrina de Jesus Machado	(Poland) KS DevelopRes Rzeszów	(Japan) Denso Airybees	
(Japan) Sachi Minowa	(Japan) Osaka Marvelous	(Japan) Denso Airybees	
(Japan) Kanna Wada	(Japan) Shimokitazawa Seitoku High School	(Japan) Denso Airybees	
(Japan) Aya Watanabe	(Japan) Saga Hisamitsu Springs	(Japan) Astemo Rivale Ibaraki	
(Japan) Yui Hamamura	(Japan) Tokyo Women's College of Physical Education	(Japan) Astemo Rivale Ibaraki	
(Japan) Mai Samura	(Japan) Aoyama Gakuin University	(Japan) Astemo Rivale Ibaraki	
(Japan) Momoka Niida	(Japan) Saitama Ageo Medics	(Japan) Gunma Green Wings	
(Japan) Haruka Yamashita	(Japan) Osaka Marvelous	(Japan) Gunma Green Wings	
(Japan) Maho Kudo	(Japan) Aranmare Yamagata	(Japan) Gunma Green Wings	
(Poland) Olivia Różański	(Turkey) Beşiktaş JK	(Japan) Gunma Green Wings	
(Bulgaria) Nasya Dimitrova	(Turkey) Kuzeyboru	(Japan) Gunma Green Wings	
(Vietnam) Trần Thị Thanh Thúy	(Vietnam) VTV Bình Điền Long An	(Japan) Gunma Green Wings	
(Japan) Yuka Hori	(Japan) Tezukayama University	(Japan) Gunma Green Wings	
(Japan) Arina Tsutsumi	(Japan) Meikai University	(Japan) Gunma Green Wings	
(Japan) Manaka Yokoyama	(Japan) Kokushikan University	(Japan) Gunma Green Wings	
(Japan) Izumi Nagai	(Japan) Meikai University	(Japan) Gunma Green Wings	
(Japan) Sakura Nishikawa	(Japan) Sonoda University	(Japan) Gunma Green Wings	
(Japan) Mai Irisawa	(Japan) Tokyo Cerisier	(Japan) Saitama Ageo Medics	
(United States) Izabella Maria Rapacz	(United States) Colombus Fury	(Japan) Saitama Ageo Medics	
(Japan) Fuyumi Hawi Okumu Oba	(Japan) Astemo Rivale Ibaraki	(Japan) Saitama Ageo Medics	
(United States) Giovanna Day	(United States) LOVB Atlanta	(Japan) NEC Red Rockets Kawasaki	
(Italy) Sylvia Nwakalor	(Japan) Toray Arrows Shiga	(Japan) NEC Red Rockets Kawasaki	
(Dominican Republic) Camila De La Rosa	(United States) Florida A&M University	(Japan) NEC Red Rockets Kawasaki	
(Japan) Miyu Nakagawa	(Japan) Saga Hisamitsu Springs	(Japan) Kurobe AquaFairies	
(Japan) Hana Okuhara	(Japan) Saga Hisamitsu Springs	(Japan) Kurobe AquaFairies	
(Brazil) Leirelainy Saito de Andrade	(Japan) Breath Hamamatsu	(Japan) Kurobe AquaFairies	
(United States) Shayla Hoeft	(Portugal) FC Porto	(Japan) Kurobe AquaFairies	
(Japan) Hitomi Kozono	(Japan) Tokyo Women's College of Physical Education	(Japan) Kurobe AquaFairies	
(Japan) Tamaki Matsui	(United States) LOVB Salt Lake	(Japan) PFU BlueCats Ishikawa Kahoku	
(Japan) Mami Yokota	(Japan) Queenseis Kariya	(Japan) PFU BlueCats Ishikawa Kahoku	
(Japan) Yuki Nishikawa	(Japan) Osaka Marvelous	(Japan) PFU BlueCats Ishikawa Kahoku	
(Thailand) Nootsara Tomkom	(United States) Colombus Fury	(Japan) Queenseis Kariya	
(Germany) Marie Schölzel	(Italy) SMI Roma Volley	(Japan) Queenseis Kariya	
(Russia) Sofya Kuznetsova	(Brazil) Dentil Praia Clube	(Japan) Queenseis Kariya	
(United States) Danielle Cuttino	(United States) LOVB Atlanta	(Japan) Queenseis Kariya	
(France) Lucille Gicquel	(Italy) Chieri '76 Volleyball	(Japan) Toray Arrows Shiga	
(Japan) Aika Hayashida	(Japan) Gunma Green Wings	(Japan) Toray Arrows Shiga	
(Japan) Rin Honda	(Japan) University of Tsukuba	(Japan) Toray Arrows Shiga	
(Japan) Koyuki Oritate	(Japan) NSSU	(Japan) Toray Arrows Shiga	
(United States) Samantha Francis	(United States) LOVB Nebraska	(Japan) Osaka Marvelous	
(Philippines) Alyssa Jae Solomon	(Philippines) NU Lady Bulldogs	(Japan) Osaka Marvelous	
(Japan) Nanami Tokumoto	(Japan) Kinrankai High School	(Japan) Osaka Marvelous	
(Japan) Kyoka Oshima	(Japan) Kurashiki Ablaze	(Japan) Victorina Himeji	
(South Korea) Lee Jae-yeong	(Greece) PAOK	(Japan) Victorina Himeji	
(Italy) Camilla Mingardi	(Italy) Savino Del Bene Scandicci	(Japan) Victorina Himeji	
(Japan) Rui Nonaka	(Japan) Astemo Rivale Ibaraki	(Japan) Victorina Himeji	
(Japan) Satomi Fukudome	(Italy) Vero Volley Milano	(Japan) Victorina Himeji	
(Bulgaria) Mira Todorova	(Romania) CSO Voluntari 2005	(Japan) Victorina Himeji	
(Japan) Mizuki Ninomiya	(Japan) Tokyo Women's College of Physical Education	(Japan) Victorina Himeji	
(Japan) Akiho Kurisu	(Japan) Saitama Ageo Medics	(Japan) Okayama Seagulls	
(Japan) Wakana Fujimura	(Japan) Hiroshima Oilers	(Japan) Okayama Seagulls	
(Japan) Nanaka Sahara	(Japan) Osaka International High School	(Japan) Okayama Seagulls	
(Vietnam) Trần Thị Bích Thủy	(Vietnam) Hóa chất Đức Giang	(Japan) Okayama Seagulls	
(Japan) Aki Momii	(Greece) AEK Athens	(Japan) Saga Hisamitsu Springs	
(Thailand) Hattaya Bamrungsuk	(Thailand) Queenseis Kariya	(Japan) Saga Hisamitsu Springs	
(Greece) Olga Strantzali	(Italy) Volley Talmassons	(Japan) Saga Hisamitsu Springs	
(Japan) Haruka Yamashita	(Japan) NIFS	(Japan) Saga Hisamitsu Springs	
(Japan) Meika Ogino	(Japan) Shimokitazawa Seitoku High School	(Japan) Saga Hisamitsu Springs	
(Japan) Kokoro Semba	(Japan) Shujitsu High School	(Japan) Saga Hisamitsu Springs	
(Switzerland) Julie Lengweiler	(Poland) MOYA Radomka Radom	(Japan) Saga Hisamitsu Springs	

== Schedule ==
=== Regular season ===
The season began on Friday, October 10, 2025, and ended on Sunday, April 5, 2026.

1. Each club will play a total of 44 matches in a home-and-away format, with 22 of those matches being home games.
2. The top 8 clubs from the regular season will advance to the Championship.
3. The final standings for the clubs ranked 9th to 14th will be determined based on the results of the regular season.
4. All matches will be played as best-of-five sets.

=== Championship ===
Begins on Friday, April 10, 2026, and ends on Monday, April 27, 2026.

1. The Championship will be conducted in a tournament format.
2. The clubs ranked 1st to 8th in the regular season will play in the Quarterfinals based on their rankings at the end of the regular season.
3. The winners of the Quarterfinals will advance to the Semifinals, and the winners of the Semifinals will advance to the Final.
4. There will be no ranking matches for the clubs that lose in the Quarterfinals and Semifinals; the final rankings for the 3rd to 8th clubs will be determined based on the final regular season standings.
5. All matches, except for the Final, will be hosted by the higher-ranked club from the regular season.
6. All matches will be played as best-of-five sets.

Source:SV.League - Schedule

== Season standing procedure ==
=== Regular season ===
Points awarded per match are as follows:

- 3 Points: Win with a set score of "3-0" or "3-1"
- 2 Points: Win with a set score of "3-2"
- 1 Point: Loss with a set score of "2-3"
- 0 Points: Loss with a set score of "0-3" or "1-3"

=== Championship ===
A best-of-three format will be used, with the team winning two out of three matches advancing.

If both teams have one win each, a third match will be played to determine the winner.

Source:SV.League - Regulation

== Regular Round ==
=== Ranking ===
Qualified for the Final

2025–26 SV.League Women's Regular Round Final Standing
Rank	Team	Match	Win	Loss	Point	Win Ratio	Win Set	Loss Set	Set Rates
1	NEC Red Rockets Kawasaki	44	36	8	104	0.82	119	51	2.33
2	Saga Hisamitsu Springs	44	36	8	99	0.82	115	54	213
3	PFU BlueCats Ishikawa Kahoku	44	31	13	96	0.70	111	59	1.88
4	Osaka Marvelous	44	30	14	91	0.68	109	62	1.76
5	Victorina Himeji	44	28	16	82	0.64	100	67	1.49
6	Queenseis Kariya	44	26	18	84	0.59	102	68	1.50
7	Gunma Green Wings	44	25	19	73	0.57	90	79	1.14
8	Saitama Ageo Medics	44	23	21	62	0.52	84	93	0.90
9	Denso Airybees	44	22	22	68	0.50	87	80	1.09
10	Astemo Rivale Ibaraki	44	18	26	58	0.41	75	94	0.80
11	Kurobe AquaFairies	44	17	27	50	0.39	75	99	0.76
12	Okayama Seagulls	44	7	37	25	0.16	41	116	0.35
13	Toray Arrows Shiga	44	6	38	21	0.14	40	122	0.33
14	Aranmare Yamagata	44	3	41	11	0.07	20	124	0.16

Source: SV.League Women's - Standings

=== Week 1 ===
- All times are Japan Standard Time (UTC+09:00).

10 October 2025; 19:05	Kurobe AquaFairies	3-1	Okayama Seagulls	Kurobe City Gymnastics Center, Toyama
10 October 2025; 19:05	26-24, 25-20, 22-25, 25-13; Report			Kurobe City Gymnastics Center, Toyama

10 October 2025; 19:10	Osaka Marvelous	1-3	Victorina Himeji	Ookini Arena Maishima, Osaka
10 October 2025; 19:10	19-25, 25-21, 21-25, 10-25; Report			Ookini Arena Maishima, Osaka

11 October 2025; 13:05	Denso Airybees	3-0	Toray Arrows Shiga	Horaiya Bonds Arena, Fukushima
11 October 2025; 13:05	25-21, 25-17, 25-22; Report			Horaiya Bonds Arena, Fukushima

11 October 2025; 13:05	Saitama Ageo Medics	3-2	PFU BlueCats Ishikawa Kahoku	Lipro Martial Arts Arena, Saitama
11 October 2025; 13:05	21-25, 25-21, 21-25, 25-21, 15-11; Report			Lipro Martial Arts Arena, Saitama

11 October 2025; 14:05	Kurobe AquaFairies	3-0	Okayama Seagulls	Kurobe City Gymnastics Center, Toyama
11 October 2025; 14:05	25-21, 25-20, 25-17; Report			Kurobe City Gymnastics Center, Toyama

11 October 2025; 14:05	Aranmare Yamagata	1-3	Astemo Rivale Ibaraki	INPEX Sakata Arena, Yamagata
11 October 2025; 14:05	25-22, 18-25, 15-25, 17-25; Report			INPEX Sakata Arena, Yamagata

11 October 2025; 14:05	NEC Red Rockets Kawasaki	3-0	Saga Hisamitsu Springs	Tokyu Dresser Todoroki Arena, Kanagawa
11 October 2025; 14:05	25-18, 25-22, 25-23; Report			Tokyu Dresser Todoroki Arena, Kanagawa

11 October 2025; 15:05	Osaka Marvelous	2-3	Victorina Himeji	Ookini Arena Maishima, Osaka
11 October 2025; 15:05	25-17, 26-28, 25-23, 22-25, 11-15; Report			Ookini Arena Maishima, Osaka

12 October 2025; 13:05	Aranmare Yamagata	1-3	Astemo Rivale Ibaraki	INPEX Sakata Arena, Yamagata
12 October 2025; 13:05	18-25, 14-25, 25-14, 20-25; Report			INPEX Sakata Arena, Yamagata

12 October 2025; 13:05	Denso Airybees	3-0	Toray Arrows Shiga	Horaiya Bonds Arena, Fukushima
12 October 2025; 13:05	27-25, 25-22, 25-20; Report			Horaiya Bonds Arena, Fukushima

12 October 2025; 13:05	Saitama Ageo Medics	3-1	PFU BlueCats Ishikawa Kahoku	Lipro Martial Arts Arena, Saitama
12 October 2025; 13:05	25-22, 18-25, 25-17, 25-19; Report			Lipro Martial Arts Arena, Saitama

12 October 2025; 13:05	NEC Red Rockets Kawasaki	3-0	Saga Hisamitsu Springs	Tokyu Dresser Todoroki Arena, Kanagawa
12 October 2025; 13:05	25-20, 25-22, 25-20; Report			Tokyu Dresser Todoroki Arena, Kanagawa

12 October 2025; 14:05	Queenseis Kariya	1-3	Gunma Green Wings	Kariya City Gymnasium, Aichi
12 October 2025; 14:05	31-29, 19-25, 25-27, 21-25; Report			Kariya City Gymnasium, Aichi

13 October 2025; 13:05	Queenseis Kariya	3-1	Gunma Green Wings	Kariya City Gymnasium, Aichi
13 October 2025; 13:05	21-25, 25-15, 25-18, 25-22; Report			Kariya City Gymnasium, Aichi

=== Week 2 ===
- All times are Japan Standard Time (UTC+09:00).

18 October 2025; 13:05	Gunma Green Wings	0-3	NEC Red Rockets Kawasaki	Yamato Citizen Gymnasium Maebashi, Gunma
18 October 2025; 13:05	20-25, 17-25, 22-25; Report			Yamato Citizen Gymnasium Maebashi, Gunma

18 October 2025; 13:05	Saitama Ageo Medics	2-3	Kurobe AquaFairies	Ageo Sports Park, Saitama
18 October 2025; 13:05	25-23, 20-25, 20-25, 28-26, 13-15; Report			Ageo Sports Park, Saitama

18 October 2025; 13:05	PFU BlueCats Ishikawa Kahoku	3-0	Okayama Seagulls	Toriyasaimiso BLUECATS ARENA, Ishikawa
18 October 2025; 13:05	25-20, 25-21, 25-14; Report			Toriyasaimiso BLUECATS ARENA, Ishikawa

18 October 2025; 14:05	Astemo Rivale Ibaraki	0-3	Denso Airybees	Hitachinaka City Sports Park Total Gymnastics, Ibaraki
18 October 2025; 14:05	24-26, 20-25, 17-25; Report			Hitachinaka City Sports Park Total Gymnastics, Ibaraki

18 October 2025; 14:05	Osaka Marvelous	3-1	Aranmare Yamagata	HOS Sumiyoshi Sports Center, Osaka
18 October 2025; 14:05	20-25, 25-18, 25-23, 25-21; Report			HOS Sumiyoshi Sports Center, Osaka

18 October 2025; 14:05	Saga Hisamitsu Springs	1-3	Queenseis Kariya	Saga Arena, Saga
18 October 2025; 14:05	25-21, 23-25, 26-28, 20-25; Report			Saga Arena, Saga

18 October 2025; 15:05	Toray Arrows Shiga	1-3	Victorina Himeji	Kusatsu City Shiga Toyota Arena, Shiga
18 October 2025; 15:05	27-25, 16-25, 31-33, 19-25; Report			Kusatsu City Shiga Toyota Arena, Shiga

19 October 2025; 13:05	Gunma Green Wings	0-3	NEC Red Rockets Kawasaki	Yamato Citizen Gymnasium Maebashi, Gunma
19 October 2025; 13:05	22-25, 15-25, 23-25; Report			Yamato Citizen Gymnasium Maebashi, Gunma

19 October 2025; 13:05	Saitama Ageo Medics	2-3	Kurobe AquaFairies	Ageo Sports Park, Saitama
19 October 2025; 13:05	21-25, 19-25, 26-24, 25-21, 10-15; Report			Ageo Sports Park, Saitama

19 October 2025; 13:05	PFU BlueCats Ishikawa Kahoku	3-0	Okayama Seagulls	Toriyasaimiso BLUECATS ARENA, Ishikawa
19 October 2025; 13:05	25-15, 25-15, 25-20; Report			Toriyasaimiso BLUECATS ARENA, Ishikawa

19 October 2025; 14:05	Astemo Rivale Ibaraki	3-1	Denso Airybees	Hitachinaka City Sports Park Total Gymnastics, Ibaraki
19 October 2025; 14:05	25-22, 19-25, 25-22, 25-16; Report			Hitachinaka City Sports Park Total Gymnastics, Ibaraki

19 October 2025; 14:05	Osaka Marvelous	3-0	Aranmare Yamagata	HOS Sumiyoshi Sports Center, Osaka
19 October 2025; 14:05	25-21, 25-21, 25-16; Report			HOS Sumiyoshi Sports Center, Osaka

19 October 2025; 14:05	Saga Hisamitsu Springs	3-1	Queenseis Kariya	Saga Arena, Saga
19 October 2025; 14:05	25-20, 25-11, 22-25, 25-20; Report			Saga Arena, Saga

19 October 2025; 15:05	Toray Arrows Shiga	0-3	Victorina Himeji	Kusatsu City Shiga Toyota Arena, Shiga
19 October 2025; 15:05	27-29, 20-25, 24-26; Report			Kusatsu City Shiga Toyota Arena, Shiga

=== Week 3 ===
- All times are Japan Standard Time (UTC+09:00).

24 October 2025; 18:35	NEC Red Rockets Kawasaki	3-2	Osaka Marvelous	Tokyu Dresser Todoroki Arena, Kanagawa
24 October 2025; 18:35	25-23, 25-23, 21-25, 17-25, 15-13; Report			Tokyu Dresser Todoroki Arena, Kanagawa

25 October 2025; 13:05	Denso Airybees	0-3	Saga Hisamitsu Springs	Fukushima Toyota Crown Arena, Fukushima
25 October 2025; 13:05	20-25, 22-25, 18-25; Report			Fukushima Toyota Crown Arena, Fukushima

25 October 2025; 13:05	Gunma Green Wings	3-1	PFU BlueCats Ishikawa Kahoku	OPEN HOUSE ARENA OTA, Gunma
25 October 2025; 13:05	25-21, 25-22, 17-25, 25-20; Report			OPEN HOUSE ARENA OTA, Gunma

25 October 2025; 14:05	Kurobe AquaFairies	3-2	Queenseis Kariya	Kurobe City Gymnastics Center, Toyama
25 October 2025; 14:05	23-25, 16-25, 25-22, 25-23, 19-17; Report			Kurobe City Gymnastics Center, Toyama

25 October 2025; 14:05	Victorina Himeji	3-0	Aranmare Yamagata	Victorina Wink Gymnasium, Hyogo
25 October 2025; 14:05	25-14, 25-22, 25-15; Report			Victorina Wink Gymnasium, Hyogo

25 October 2025; 14:05	Okayama Seagulls	1-3	Toray Arrows Shiga	Shigeto Arena Okayama, Okayama
25 October 2025; 14:05	25-22, 22-25, 17-25, 23-25; Report			Shigeto Arena Okayama, Okayama

25 October 2025; 15:35	NEC Red Rockets Kawasaki	3-2	Osaka Marvelous	Tokyu Dresser Todoroki Arena, Kanagawa
25 October 2025; 15:35	22-25, 17-25, 25-18, 26-24, 19-17; Report			Tokyu Dresser Todoroki Arena, Kanagawa

26 October 2025; 13:05	Denso Airybees	0-3	Saga Hisamitsu Springs	Fukushima Toyota Crown Arena, Fukushima
26 October 2025; 13:05	18-25, 21-25, 26-28; Report			Fukushima Toyota Crown Arena, Fukushima

26 October 2025; 13:05	Gunma Green Wings	3-2	PFU BlueCats Ishikawa Kahoku	OPEN HOUSE ARENA OTA, Gunma
26 October 2025; 13:05	21-25, 25-22, 16-25, 25-22, 15-12; Report			OPEN HOUSE ARENA OTA, Gunma

26 October 2025; 14:05	Kurobe AquaFairies	3-1	Queenseis Kariya	Kurobe City Gymnastics Center, Toyama
26 October 2025; 14:05	27-25, 20-25, 25-18, 25-19; Report			Kurobe City Gymnastics Center, Toyama

26 October 2025; 14:05	Victorina Himeji	3-0	Aranmare Yamagata	Victorina Wink Gymnasium, Hyogo
26 October 2025; 14:05	25-12, 25-17, 25-18; Report			Victorina Wink Gymnasium, Hyogo

26 October 2025; 14:05	Okayama Seagulls	2-3	Toray Arrows Shiga	Shigeto Arena Okayama, Okayama
26 October 2025; 14:05	25-19, 24-26, 25-22, 29-31, 11-15; Report			Shigeto Arena Okayama, Okayama

21 February 2026; 13:05	Saitama Ageo Medics	3-2	Astemo Rivale Ibaraki	Ota City General Gymnasium, Tokyo
21 February 2026; 13:05	21-25, 25-19, 25-20, 18-25, 16-14; Report			Ota City General Gymnasium, Tokyo

22 February 2026; 13:05	Saitama Ageo Medics	0-3	Astemo Rivale Ibaraki	Ota City General Gymnasium, Tokyo
22 February 2026; 13:05	23-25, 22-25, 20-25; Report			Ota City General Gymnasium, Tokyo

* The matches between Ageo and Rivale was postponed.

=== Week 4 ===
- All times are Japan Standard Time (UTC+09:00).

01 November 2025; 13:05	PFU BlueCats Ishikawa Kahoku	3-1	Denso Airybees	Toriyasaimiso BLUECATS ARENA, Ishikawa
01 November 2025; 13:05	28-30, 36-34, 25-23, 25-21; Report			Toriyasaimiso BLUECATS ARENA, Ishikawa

01 November 2025; 13:05	Queenseis Kariya	3-0	Aranmare Yamagata	Wing Arena Kariya, Aichi
01 November 2025; 13:05	25-19, 25-18, 25-22; Report			Wing Arena Kariya, Aichi

01 November 2025; 13:05	Okayama Seagulls	1-3	Osaka Marvelous	Shigeto Arena Okayama, Okayama
01 November 2025; 13:05	15-25, 20-25,25-23, 14-25; Report			Shigeto Arena Okayama, Okayama

01 November 2025; 14:05	Astemo Rivale Ibaraki	0-3	NEC Red Rockets Kawasaki	CNA Arena Akita, Akita
01 November 2025; 14:05	22-25, 13-25, 19-25; Report			CNA Arena Akita, Akita

01 November 2025; 14:05	Kurobe AquaFairies	0-3	Gunma Green Wings	Kurobe City Gymnastics Center, Toyama
01 November 2025; 14:05	18-25, 20-25, 22-25; Report			Kurobe City Gymnastics Center, Toyama

01 November 2025; 14:05	Victorina Himeji	0-3	Saga Hisamitsu Springs	Victorina Wink Gymnasium, Hyogo
01 November 2025; 14:05	20-25, 21-25, 22-25; Report			Victorina Wink Gymnasium, Hyogo

01 November 2025; 15:05	Toray Arrows Shiga	1-3	Saitama Ageo Medics	Proceed Arena HIKONE, Shiga
01 November 2025; 15:05	25-23, 17-25, 20-25, 19-25; Report			Proceed Arena HIKONE, Shiga

02 November 2025; 12:05	Okayama Seagulls	0-3	Osaka Marvelous	Shigeto Arena Okayama, Okayama
02 November 2025; 12:05	19-25, 18-25, 17-25; Report			Shigeto Arena Okayama, Okayama

02 November 2025; 13:05	PFU BlueCats Ishikawa Kahoku	2-3	Denso Airybees	Toriyasaimiso BLUECATS ARENA, Ishikawa
02 November 2025; 13:05	25-20, 22-25, 20-25, 25-20, 13-15; Report			Toriyasaimiso BLUECATS ARENA, Ishikawa

02 November 2025; 13:05	Queenseis Kariya	3-0	Aranmare Yamagata	Wing Arena Kariya, Aichi
02 November 2025; 13:05	25-20, 25-23, 29-27; Report			Wing Arena Kariya, Aichi

02 November 2025; 14:05	Astemo Rivale Ibaraki	1-3	NEC Red Rockets Kawasaki	CNA Arena Akita, Akita
02 November 2025; 14:05	21-25, 25-18, 20-25, 16-25; Report			CNA Arena Akita, Akita

02 November 2025; 14:05	Kurobe AquaFairies	3-2	Gunma Green Wings	Kurobe City Gymnastics Center, Toyama
02 November 2025; 14:05	25-18, 24-26, 30-28, 19-25, 15-13; Report			Kurobe City Gymnastics Center, Toyama

02 November 2025; 14:05	Victorina Himeji	2-3	Saga Hisamitsu Springs	Victorina Wink Gymnasium, Hyogo
02 November 2025; 14:05	25-23, 16-25, 20-25, 25-22, 13-15; Report			Victorina Wink Gymnasium, Hyogo

02 November 2025; 15:05	Toray Arrows Shiga	0-3	Saitama Ageo Medics	Proceed Arena HIKONE, Shiga
02 November 2025; 15:05	22-25, 22-25, 18-25; Report			Proceed Arena HIKONE, Shiga

=== Week 5 ===
- All times are Japan Standard Time (UTC+09:00).

08 November 2025; 13:05	Denso Airybees	2-3	NEC Red Rockets Kawasaki	Fukushima Toyota Crown Arena, Fukushima
08 November 2025; 13:05	20-25, 25-18, 20-25, 26-24, 10-15; Report			Fukushima Toyota Crown Arena, Fukushima

08 November 2025; 13:05	Gunma Green Wings	1-3	Saga Hisamitsu Springs	Izumi General Park Gymnasium, Gunma
08 November 2025; 13:05	21-25, 23-25, 25-17, 19-25; Report			Izumi General Park Gymnasium, Gunma

08 November 2025; 13:05	PFU BlueCats Ishikawa Kahoku	3-0	Toray Arrows Shiga	Kanazawa City General Gymnasium, Ishikawa
08 November 2025; 13:05	25-23, 25-20, 25-18; Report			Kanazawa City General Gymnasium, Ishikawa

08 November 2025; 13:05	Queenseis Kariya	3-2	Astemo Rivale Ibaraki	Park Arena Komaki, Aichi
08 November 2025; 13:05	22-25, 17-25, 25-20, 25-16, 15-10; Report			Park Arena Komaki, Aichi

08 November 2025; 14:05	Aranmare Yamagata	0-3	Okayama Seagulls	Yamagata Prefectural Sports Park Arena, Yamagata
08 November 2025; 14:05	20-25, 24-26, 24-26; Report			Yamagata Prefectural Sports Park Arena, Yamagata

08 November 2025; 14:05	Osaka Marvelous	3-0	Kurobe AquaFairies	Panasonic Arena, Osaka
08 November 2025; 14:05	25-21, 28-26, 25-18; Report			Panasonic Arena, Osaka

08 November 2025; 15:05	Saitama Ageo Medics	3-2	Victorina Himeji	Saiden Chemical Arena Saitama, Saitama
08 November 2025; 15:05	18-25, 25-15, 25-23, 22-25, 15-11; Report			Saiden Chemical Arena Saitama, Saitama

09 November 2025; 12:05	Aranmare Yamagata	3-0	Okayama Seagulls	Yamagata Prefectural Sports Park Arena, Yamagata
09 November 2025; 12:05	26-24, 25-23, 25-14; Report			Yamagata Prefectural Sports Park Arena, Yamagata

09 November 2025; 13:05	Denso Airybees	0-3	NEC Red Rockets Kawasaki	Fukushima Toyota Crown Arena, Fukushima
09 November 2025; 13:05	22-25, 21-25, 20-25; Report			Fukushima Toyota Crown Arena, Fukushima

09 November 2025; 13:05	Gunma Green Wings	2-3	Saga Hisamitsu Springs	Izumi General Park Gymnasium, Gunma
09 November 2025; 13:05	22-25, 25-23, 25-18, 22-25, 21-23; Report			Izumi General Park Gymnasium, Gunma

09 November 2025; 13:05	PFU BlueCats Ishikawa Kahoku	3-1	Toray Arrows Shiga	Kanazawa City General Gymnasium, Ishikawa
09 November 2025; 13:05	25-17, 20-25, 25-23, 25-19; Report			Kanazawa City General Gymnasium, Ishikawa

09 November 2025; 13:05	Queenseis Kariya	3-0	Astemo Rivale Ibaraki	Park Arena Komaki, Aichi
09 November 2025; 13:05	25-17, 32-30, 25-21; Report			Park Arena Komaki, Aichi

09 November 2025; 14:05	Osaka Marvelous	3-1	Kurobe AquaFairies	Panasonic Arena, Osaka
09 November 2025; 14:05	25-22, 28-26, 20-25, 25-14; Report			Panasonic Arena, Osaka

09 November 2025; 15:05	Saitama Ageo Medics	1-3	Victorina Himeji	Saiden Chemical Arena Saitama, Saitama
09 November 2025; 15:05	21-25, 25-18, 19-25, 21-25; Report			Saiden Chemical Arena Saitama, Saitama

=== Week 6 ===
- All times are Japan Standard Time (UTC+09:00).

15 November 2025; 12:05	Osaka Marvelous	1-3	Queenseis Kariya	Ookini Arena Maishima, Osaka
15 November 2025; 12:05	25-15, 22-25, 24-26, 21-25; Report			Ookini Arena Maishima, Osaka

15 November 2025; 13:05	Denso Airybees	2-3	Saitama Ageo Medics	Horaiya Bonds Arena, Fukushima
15 November 2025; 13:05	25-23, 25-15, 24-26, 20-25, 12-15; Report			Horaiya Bonds Arena, Fukushima

15 November 2025; 14:05	Aranmare Yamagata	0-3	Gunma Green Wings	Yamagata Prefectural Sports Park Arena, Yamagata
15 November 2025; 14:05	31-33, 23-25, 19-25; Report			Yamagata Prefectural Sports Park Arena, Yamagata

15 November 2025; 14:05	NEC Red Rockets Kawasaki	1-3	PFU BlueCats Ishikawa Kahoku	Culttz Kawasaki, Kanagawa
15 November 2025; 14:05	18-25, 25-17, 21-25, 17-25; Report			Culttz Kawasaki, Kanagawa

15 November 2025; 14:05	Okayama Seagulls	0-3	Victorina Himeji	Sanyo Fureai Gymnasium, Okayama
15 November 2025; 14:05	23-25, 14-25, 12-25; Report			Sanyo Fureai Gymnasium, Okayama

15 November 2025; 14:05	Saga Hisamitsu Springs	3-0	Astemo Rivale Ibaraki	Saga Arena, Saga
15 November 2025; 14:05	25-23, 25-22, 25-16; Report			Saga Arena, Saga

15 November 2025; 15:05	Toray Arrows Shiga	3-1	Kurobe AquaFairies	Kusatsu City Shiga Toyota Arena, Shiga
15 November 2025; 15:05	26-28, 25-22, 25-16, 25-21; Report			Kusatsu City Shiga Toyota Arena, Shiga

16 November 2025; 12:05	Osaka Marvelous	3-1	Queenseis Kariya	Ookini Arena Maishima, Osaka
16 November 2025; 12:05	25-18, 25-21, 18-25, 25-21; Report			Ookini Arena Maishima, Osaka

16 November 2025; 13:05	Aranmare Yamagata	0-3	Gunma Green Wings	Yamagata Prefectural Sports Park Arena, Yamagata
16 November 2025; 13:05	22-25, 18-25, 20-25; Report			Yamagata Prefectural Sports Park Arena, Yamagata

16 November 2025; 13:05	Denso Airybees	3-0	Saitama Ageo Medics	Horaiya Bonds Arena, Fukushima
16 November 2025; 13:05	25-17, 25-19, 26-24; Report			Horaiya Bonds Arena, Fukushima

16 November 2025; 13:05	NEC Red Rockets Kawasaki	3-0	PFU BlueCats Ishikawa Kahoku	Culttz Kawasaki, Kanagawa
16 November 2025; 13:05	25-17, 25-19, 25-20; Report			Culttz Kawasaki, Kanagawa

16 November 2025; 14:05	Okayama Seagulls	0-3	Victorina Himeji	Sanyo Fureai Gymnasium, Okayama
16 November 2025; 14:05	17-25, 19-25, 19-25; Report			Sanyo Fureai Gymnasium, Okayama

16 November 2025; 14:05	Saga Hisamitsu Springs	3-0	Astemo Rivale Ibaraki	Saga Arena, Saga
16 November 2025; 14:05	25-23, 25-22, 25-18; Report			Saga Arena, Saga

16 November 2025; 15:05	Toray Arrows Shiga	0-3	Kurobe AquaFairies	Kusatsu City Shiga Toyota Arena, Shiga
16 November 2025; 15:05	18-25, 17-25, 19-25; Report			Kusatsu City Shiga Toyota Arena, Shiga

=== Week 7 ===
- All times are Japan Standard Time (UTC+09:00).

21 November 2025; 19:05	Saga Hisamitsu Springs	3-0	Toray Arrows Shiga	Saga Arena, Saga
21 November 2025; 19:05	25-11, 25-20, 25-14; Report			Saga Arena, Saga

22 November 2025; 13:05	Saitama Ageo Medics	0-3	Osaka Marvelous	Yume Arena Takata, Iwate
22 November 2025; 13:05	23-25, 21-25, 22-25; Report			Yume Arena Takata, Iwate

22 November 2025; 13:05	PFU BlueCats Ishikawa Kahoku	3-0	Astemo Rivale Ibaraki	Toriyasaimiso BLUECATS ARENA, Ishikawa
22 November 2025; 13:05	25-15, 25-17, 25-17; Report			Toriyasaimiso BLUECATS ARENA, Ishikawa

22 November 2025; 14:05	Aranmare Yamagata	0-3	Denso Airybees	Tsurushin Arena Komagihara, Yamagata
22 November 2025; 14:05	19-25, 19-25, 18-25; Report			Tsurushin Arena Komagihara, Yamagata

22 November 2025; 14:05	NEC Red Rockets Kawasaki	3-0	Queenseis Kariya	Tokyu Dresser Todoroki Arena, Kanagawa
22 November 2025; 14:05	25-22, 25-23, 25-18; Report			Tokyu Dresser Todoroki Arena, Kanagawa

22 November 2025; 14:05	Victorina Himeji	3-2	Kurobe AquaFairies	Victorina Wink Gymnasium, Hyogo
22 November 2025; 14:05	25-23, 16-25, 20-25, 25-22, 15-13; Report			Victorina Wink Gymnasium, Hyogo

22 November 2025; 14:05	Okayama Seagulls	0-3	Gunma Green Wings	Shigeto Arena Okayama, Okayama
22 November 2025; 14:05	17-25, 16-25, 21-25; Report			Shigeto Arena Okayama, Okayama

22 November 2025; 15:05	Saga Hisamitsu Springs	3-0	Toray Arrows Shiga	Saga Arena, Saga
22 November 2025; 15:05	25-20, 25-16, 25-19; Report			Saga Arena, Saga

23 November 2025; 12:05	Saitama Ageo Medics	0-3	Osaka Marvelous	Yume Arena Takata, Iwate
23 November 2025; 12:05	21-25, 11-25, 21-25; Report			Yume Arena Takata, Iwate

23 November 2025; 13:05	Aranmare Yamagata	0-3	Denso Airybees	Tsurushin Arena Komagihara, Yamagata
23 November 2025; 13:05	20-25, 18-25, 22-25; Report			Tsurushin Arena Komagihara, Yamagata

23 November 2025; 13:05	NEC Red Rockets Kawasaki	3-2	Queenseis Kariya	Tokyu Dresser Todoroki Arena, Kanagawa
23 November 2025; 13:05	25-21, 25-22, 22-25, 25-27, 15-12; Report			Tokyu Dresser Todoroki Arena, Kanagawa

23 November 2025; 13:05	PFU BlueCats Ishikawa Kahoku	1-3	Astemo Rivale Ibaraki	Toriyasaimiso BLUECATS ARENA, Ishikawa
23 November 2025; 13:05	23-25, 21-25, 25-13, 27-29; Report			Toriyasaimiso BLUECATS ARENA, Ishikawa

23 November 2025; 14:05	Victorina Himeji	3-2	Kurobe AquaFairies	Victorina Wink Gymnasium, Hyogo
23 November 2025; 14:05	21-25, 25-18, 25-21, 24-26, 16-14; Report			Victorina Wink Gymnasium, Hyogo

23 November 2025; 14:05	Okayama Seagulls	2-3	Gunma Green Wings	Shigeto Arena Okayama, Okayama
23 November 2025; 14:05	25-22, 19-25, 13-25, 25-22, 10-15; Report			Shigeto Arena Okayama, Okayama

=== Week 8 ===
- All times are Japan Standard Time (UTC+09:00).
  29 November 2025; 13:05	Denso Airybees	3-0	Okayama Seagulls	Fukushima Toyota Crown Arena, Fukushima
  29 November 2025; 13:05	25-23, 25-17, 25-13; Report			Fukushima Toyota Crown Arena, Fukushima

29 November 2025; 13:05	Gunma Green Wings	3-2	Toray Arrows Shiga	OPEN HOUSE ARENA OTA, Gunma
29 November 2025; 13:05	23-25, 27-25, 24-26, 25-20, 15-12; Report			OPEN HOUSE ARENA OTA, Gunma

29 November 2025; 13:05	PFU BlueCats Ishikawa Kahoku	3-0	Aranmare Yamagata	Toriyasaimiso BLUECATS ARENA, Ishikawa
29 November 2025; 13:05	20-25, 25-9, 25-12, 25-17; Report			Toriyasaimiso BLUECATS ARENA, Ishikawa

29 November 2025; 14:05	NEC Red Rockets Kawasaki	3-2	Saitama Ageo Medics	Culttz Kawasaki, Kanagawa
29 November 2025; 14:05	21-25, 31-29, 23-25, 25-20, 15-13; Report			Culttz Kawasaki, Kanagawa

29 November 2025; 14:05	Kurobe AquaFairies	0-3	Saga Hisamitsu Springs	Kurobe City Gymnastics Center, Toyama
29 November 2025; 14:05	20-25, 18-25, 22-25; Report			Kurobe City Gymnastics Center, Toyama

29 November 2025; 14:05	Osaka Marvelous	3-0	Astemo Rivale Ibaraki	Baycom General Gymnasium, Hyogo
29 November 2025; 14:05	25-20, 28-26, 25-18; Report			Baycom General Gymnasium, Hyogo

29 November 2025; 18:05	Queenseis Kariya	1-3	Victorina Himeji	Wing Arena Kariya, Aichi
29 November 2025; 18:05	24-26, 13-25, 25-20, 19-25; Report			Wing Arena Kariya, Aichi

30 November 2025; 13:05	Denso Airybees	1-3	Okayama Seagulls	Fukushima Toyota Crown Arena, Fukushima
30 November 2025; 13:05	22-25, 25-16, 22-25, 18-25; Report			Fukushima Toyota Crown Arena, Fukushima

30 November 2025; 13:05	Gunma Green Wings	3-1	Toray Arrows Shiga	OPEN HOUSE ARENA OTA, Gunma
30 November 2025; 13:05	25-16, 25-22, 28-30, 25-19; Report			OPEN HOUSE ARENA OTA, Gunma

30 November 2025; 13:05	NEC Red Rockets Kawasaki	2-3	Saitama Ageo Medics	Culttz Kawasaki, Kanagawa
30 November 2025; 13:05	22-25, 23-25, 25-20, 25-15, 11-15; Report			Culttz Kawasaki, Kanagawa

30 November 2025; 13:05	Kurobe AquaFairies	1-3	Saga Hisamitsu Springs	Kurobe City Gymnastics Center, Toyama
30 November 2025; 13:05	26-28, 25-21, 22-25, 14-25; Report			Kurobe City Gymnastics Center, Toyama

30 November 2025; 13:05	PFU BlueCats Ishikawa Kahoku	3-0	Aranmare Yamagata	Toriyasaimiso BLUECATS ARENA, Ishikawa
30 November 2025; 13:05	25-19, 25-20, 25-14; Report			Toriyasaimiso BLUECATS ARENA, Ishikawa

30 November 2025; 14:05	Osaka Marvelous	3-2	Astemo Rivale Ibaraki	Baycom General Gymnasium, Hyogo
30 November 2025; 14:05	23-25, 24-26, 25-18, 25-17, 15-13; Report			Baycom General Gymnasium, Hyogo

30 November 2025; 15:05	Queenseis Kariya	2-3	Victorina Himeji	Wing Arena Kariya, Aichi
30 November 2025; 15:05	25-14, 24-26, 25-23, 21-25, 10-15; Report			Wing Arena Kariya, Aichi

=== Week 9 ===
- All times are Japan Standard Time (UTC+09:00).

06 December 2025; 13:05	Denso Airybees	0-3	Osaka Marvelous	Horaiya Bonds Arena, Fukushima
06 December 2025; 13:05	24-26, 24-26, 15-25; Report			Horaiya Bonds Arena, Fukushima

06 December 2025; 14:05	Aranmare Yamagata	1-3	NEC Red Rockets Kawasaki	INPEX Sakata Arena, Yamagata
06 December 2025; 14:05	16-25, 17-25, 25-23, 21-25; Report			INPEX Sakata Arena, Yamagata

06 December 2025; 14:05	Astemo Rivale Ibaraki	2-3	Kurobe AquaFairies	Hitachinaka City Sports Park Total Gymnastics, Ibaraki
06 December 2025; 14:05	22-25, 25-20, 20-25, 25-21, 11-15; Report			Hitachinaka City Sports Park Total Gymnastics, Ibaraki

06 December 2025; 14:05	Victorina Himeji	0-3	Gunma Green Wings	SHOWA Group General Gymnasium, Hyogo
06 December 2025; 14:05	18-25, 26-28, 19-25; Report			SHOWA Group General Gymnasium, Hyogo

06 December 2025; 14:05	Okayama Seagulls	3-1	Saitama Ageo Medics	Sanyo Fureai Gymnasium, Okayama
06 December 2025; 14:05	25-22, 18-25, 25-20, 25-18; Report			Sanyo Fureai Gymnasium, Okayama

06 December 2025; 14:05	Saga Hisamitsu Springs	1-3	PFU BlueCats Ishikawa Kahoku	Teruha Sekisui House Arena, Fukuoka
06 December 2025; 14:05	25-27, 17-25, 25-15, 18-25; Report			Teruha Sekisui House Arena, Fukuoka

06 December 2025; 15:05	Toray Arrows Shiga	0-3	Queenseis Kariya	Kusatsu City Shiga Toyota Arena, Shiga
06 December 2025; 15:05	18-25, 21-25, 21-25; Report			Kusatsu City Shiga Toyota Arena, Shiga

07 December 2025; 13:05	Aranmare Yamagata	0-3	NEC Red Rockets Kawasaki	INPEX Sakata Arena, Yamagata
07 December 2025; 13:05	15-25, 17-25, 17-25; Report			INPEX Sakata Arena, Yamagata

07 December 2025; 13:05	Denso Airybees	3-2	Osaka Marvelous	Horaiya Bonds Arena, Fukushima
07 December 2025; 13:05	26-24, 16-25, 11-25, 25-23, 15-7; Report			Horaiya Bonds Arena, Fukushima

07 December 2025; 13:05	Saga Hisamitsu Springs	3-2	PFU BlueCats Ishikawa Kahoku	Teruha Sekisui House Arena, Fukuoka
07 December 2025; 13:05	21-25, 25-18, 25-20, 28-30, 17-15; Report			Teruha Sekisui House Arena, Fukuoka

07 December 2025; 14:05	Astemo Rivale Ibaraki	3-2	Kurobe AquaFairies	Hitachinaka City Sports Park Total Gymnastics, Ibaraki
07 December 2025; 14:05	26-24, 23-25, 25-21, 23-25, 15-13; Report			Hitachinaka City Sports Park Total Gymnastics, Ibaraki

07 December 2025; 14:05	Victorina Himeji	3-2	Gunma Green Wings	SHOWA Group General Gymnasium, Hyogo
07 December 2025; 14:05	21-25, 20-25, 25-20, 25-23, 16-14; Report			SHOWA Group General Gymnasium, Hyogo

07 December 2025; 14:05	Okayama Seagulls	1-3	Saitama Ageo Medics	Sanyo Fureai Gymnasium, Okayama
07 December 2025; 14:05	25-18, 22-25, 22-25, 17-25; Report			Sanyo Fureai Gymnasium, Okayama

07 December 2025; 15:05	Toray Arrows Shiga	0-3	Queenseis Kariya	Kusatsu City Shiga Toyota Arena, Shiga
07 December 2025; 15:05	23-25, 22-25, 19-25; Report			Kusatsu City Shiga Toyota Arena, Shiga

=== Week 10 ===
- All times are Japan Standard Time (UTC+09:00).

27 December 2025; 13:05	PFU BlueCats Ishikawa Kahoku	2-3	Osaka Marvelous	Komatsu General Gymnasium, Ishikawa
27 December 2025; 13:05	25-21, 25-20, 16-25, 22-25, 11-15; Report			Komatsu General Gymnasium, Ishikawa

27 December 2025; 14:05	Astemo Rivale Ibaraki	3-1	Toray Arrows Shiga	Ikenokawa Sakura Arena, Ibaraki
27 December 2025; 14:05	25-16, 20-25, 25-18, 25-21; Report			Ikenokawa Sakura Arena, Ibaraki

27 December 2025; 14:05	Kurobe AquaFairies	3-0	Aranmare Yamagata	Ariso Dome, Toyama
27 December 2025; 14:05	25-20, 25-20, 25-17; Report			Ariso Dome, Toyama

27 December 2025; 14:05	Queenseis Kariya	3-0	Denso Airybees	Nishihara Shokai Arena, Kagoshima
27 December 2025; 14:05	25-21, 25-17, 25-19; Report			Nishihara Shokai Arena, Kagoshima

27 December 2025; 14:05	Victorina Himeji	1-3	NEC Red Rockets Kawasaki	Victorina Wink Gymnasium, Hyogo
27 December 2025; 14:05	34-32, 21-25, 15-25, 17-25; Report			Victorina Wink Gymnasium, Hyogo

27 December 2025; 14:05	Saga Hisamitsu Springs	3-2	Okayama Seagulls	Saga Arena, Saga
27 December 2025; 14:05	25-21, 23-25, 23-25, 25-22, 15-4; Report			Saga Arena, Saga

28 December 2025; 13:05	PFU BlueCats Ishikawa Kahoku	3-1	Osaka Marvelous	Komatsu General Gymnasium, Ishikawa
28 December 2025; 13:05	25-17, 25-23, 22-25, 25-22; Report			Komatsu General Gymnasium, Ishikawa

28 December 2025; 13:05	Queenseis Kariya	3-1	Denso Airybees	Nishihara Shokai Arena, Kagoshima
28 December 2025; 13:05	25-18, 20-25, 27-25, 25-20; Report			Nishihara Shokai Arena, Kagoshima

28 December 2025; 13:05	Saitama Ageo Medics	2-3	Gunma Green Wings	Ageo Citizen Gymnasium, Saitama
28 December 2025; 13:05	22-25, 23-25, 25-18, 25-21, 6-15; Report			Ageo Citizen Gymnasium, Saitama

28 December 2025; 14:05	Astemo Rivale Ibaraki	3-0	Toray Arrows Shiga	Ikenokawa Sakura Arena, Ibaraki
28 December 2025; 14:05	25-19, 25-20, 25-19; Report			Ikenokawa Sakura Arena, Ibaraki

28 December 2025; 14:05	Kurobe AquaFairies	3-2	Aranmare Yamagata	Ariso Dome, Toyama
28 December 2025; 14:05	24-26, 23-25, 25-20, 25-14, 17-15; Report			Ariso Dome, Toyama

28 December 2025; 14:05	Victorina Himeji	1-3	NEC Red Rockets Kawasaki	Victorina Wink Gymnasium, Hyogo
28 December 2025; 14:05	17-25, 21-25, 25-23, 16-25; Report			Victorina Wink Gymnasium, Hyogo

28 December 2025; 14:05	Saga Hisamitsu Springs	3-0	Okayama Seagulls	Saga Arena, Saga
28 December 2025; 14:05	25-18, 27-25, 25-23; Report			Saga Arena, Saga

29 December 2025; 13:05	Saitama Ageo Medics	0-3	Gunma Green Wings	Ageo Citizen Gymnasium, Saitama
29 December 2025; 13:05	24-26, 21-25, 14-25; Report			Ageo Citizen Gymnasium, Saitama

=== Week 11 ===
- All times are Japan Standard Time (UTC+09:00).

03 January 2026; 13:05	Gunma Green Wings	2-3	Astemo Rivale Ibaraki	Yamato Citizen Gymnasium Maebashi, Gunma
03 January 2026; 13:05	24-26, 18-25, 25-20, 25-19, 12-15; Report			Yamato Citizen Gymnasium Maebashi, Gunma

03 January 2026; 13:05	Saitama Ageo Medics	3-2	Queenseis Kariya	Ageo Citizen Gymnasium, Saitama
03 January 2026; 13:05	19-25, 25-22, 23-25, 25-17, 15-13; Report			Ageo Citizen Gymnasium, Saitama

03 January 2026; 14:05	Victorina Himeji	2-3	Osaka Marvelous	Victorina Wink Gymnasium, Hyogo
03 January 2026; 14:05	20-25, 25-15, 27-25, 16-25, 12-15; Report			Victorina Wink Gymnasium, Hyogo

04 January 2026; 13:05	Gunma Green Wings	3-0	Astemo Rivale Ibaraki	Yamato Citizen Gymnasium Maebashi, Gunma
04 January 2026; 13:05	25-20, 25-22, 25-19; Report			Yamato Citizen Gymnasium Maebashi, Gunma

04 January 2026; 13:05	Saitama Ageo Medics	3-2	Queenseis Kariya	Ageo Citizen Gymnasium, Saitama
04 January 2026; 13:05	25-23, 25-14, 21-25, 18-25, 15-12; Report			Ageo Citizen Gymnasium, Saitama

04 January 2026; 14:05	Victorina Himeji	1-3	Osaka Marvelous	Victorina Wink Gymnasium, Hyogo
04 January 2026; 14:05	23-25, 25-20, 23-25, 17-25; Report			Victorina Wink Gymnasium, Hyogo

21 February 2026; 13:05	Okayama Seagulls	0-3	NEC Red Rockets Kawasaki	Shigeto Arena Okayama, Okayama
21 February 2026; 13:05	22-25, 15-25, 23-25; Report			Shigeto Arena Okayama, Okayama

21 February 2026; 14:05	Aranmare Yamagata	0-3	Saga Hisamitsu Springs	Yamagata City Sports Center, Yamagata
21 February 2026; 14:05	18-25, 18-25, 11-25; Report			Yamagata City Sports Center, Yamagata

21 February 2026; 14:05	Kurobe AquaFairies	1-3	PFU BlueCats Ishikawa Kahoku	Toyamaken Seibu Taiiku Center, Toyama
21 February 2026; 14:05	20-25, 25-19, 23-25, 19-25; Report			Toyamaken Seibu Taiiku Center, Toyama

21 February 2026; 15:05	Toray Arrows Shiga	3-2	Denso Airybees	Kusatsu City Shiga Toyota Arena, Shiga
21 February 2026; 15:05	25-18, 25-19, 18-25, 21-25, 16-14; Report			Kusatsu City Shiga Toyota Arena, Shiga

22 February 2026; 12:05	Okayama Seagulls	0-3	NEC Red Rockets Kawasaki	Shigeto Arena Okayama, Okayama
22 February 2026; 12:05	22-25, 25-27, 23-25; Report			Shigeto Arena Okayama, Okayama

22 February 2026; 13:05	Aranmare Yamagata	1-3	Saga Hisamitsu Springs	Yamagata City Sports Center, Yamagata
22 February 2026; 13:05	12-25, 25-20, 15-25, 11-25; Report			Yamagata City Sports Center, Yamagata

22 February 2026; 14:05	Kurobe AquaFairies	1-3	PFU BlueCats Ishikawa Kahoku	Toyamaken Seibu Taiiku Center, Toyama
22 February 2026; 14:05	25-23, 22-25, 21-25, 17-25; Report			Toyamaken Seibu Taiiku Center, Toyama

22 February 2026; 15:05	Toray Arrows Shiga	0-3	Denso Airybees	Kusatsu City Shiga Toyota Arena, Shiga
22 February 2026; 15:05	11-25, 15-25, 16-25; Report			Kusatsu City Shiga Toyota Arena, Shiga

- The matches on 21-22 February was postponed match.

=== Week 12 ===
- All times are Japan Standard Time (UTC+09:00).

10 January 2026; 13:05	Gunma Green Wings	0-3	Queenseis Kariya	Takasaki Arena, Gunma
10 January 2026; 13:05	11-25, 20-25, 19-25; Report			Takasaki Arena, Gunma

10 January 2026; 13:05	Saitama Ageo Medics	3-0	Aranmare Yamagata	Ageo Citizen Gymnasium, Saitama
10 January 2026; 13:05	25-21, 25-20, 27-25; Report			Ageo Citizen Gymnasium, Saitama

10 January 2026; 14:05	Astemo Rivale Ibaraki	0-3	Victorina Himeji	Hitachinaka City Sports Park Total Gymnastics, Ibaraki
10 January 2026; 14:05	18-25, 21-25, 16-25; Report			Hitachinaka City Sports Park Total Gymnastics, Ibaraki

10 January 2026; 14:05	Kurobe AquaFairies	3-1	Denso Airybees	Kurobe City Gymnastics Center, Toyama
10 January 2026; 14:05	25-17, 25-19, 13-25, 25-22; Report			Kurobe City Gymnastics Center, Toyama

10 January 2026; 14:05	Osaka Marvelous	3-1	Saga Hisamitsu Springs	Nishinomiya City Central Gymnasium, Hyogo
10 January 2026; 14:05	21-25, 25-21, 25-21, 25-15; Report			Nishinomiya City Central Gymnasium, Hyogo

10 January 2026; 14:05	Okayama Seagulls	0-3	PFU BlueCats Ishikawa Kahoku	Shigeto Arena Okayama, Okayama
10 January 2026; 14:05	18-25, 22-25, 22-25; Report			Shigeto Arena Okayama, Okayama

10 January 2026; 15:05	Toray Arrows Shiga	1-3	NEC Red Rockets Kawasaki	Shiga Daihatsu Arena, Shiga
10 January 2026; 15:05	15-25, 18-25, 26-24, 23-25; Report			Shiga Daihatsu Arena, Shiga

11 January 2026; 13:05	Gunma Green Wings	3-2	Queenseis Kariya	Takasaki Arena, Gunma
11 January 2026; 13:05	18-25, 23-25, 25-21, 27-25, 15-10; Report			Takasaki Arena, Gunma

11 January 2026; 13:05	Saitama Ageo Medics	3-1	Aranmare Yamagata	Ageo Citizen Gymnasium, Saitama
11 January 2026; 13:05	25-21, 25-14, 26-28, 25-16; Report			Ageo Citizen Gymnasium, Saitama

11 January 2026; 14:05	Astemo Rivale Ibaraki	0-3	Victorina Himeji	Hitachinaka City Sports Park Total Gymnastics, Ibaraki
11 January 2026; 14:05	21-25, 15-25, 21-25; Report			Hitachinaka City Sports Park Total Gymnastics, Ibaraki

11 January 2026; 14:05	Kurobe AquaFairies	1-3	Denso Airybees	Kurobe City Gymnastics Center, Toyama
11 January 2026; 14:05	25-21, 14-25, 13-25, 18-25; Report			Kurobe City Gymnastics Center, Toyama

11 January 2026; 14:05	Osaka Marvelous	2-3	Saga Hisamitsu Springs	Nishinomiya City Central Gymnasium, Hyogo
11 January 2026; 14:05	26-24, 25-18, 20-25, 11-25, 9-15; Report			Nishinomiya City Central Gymnasium, Hyogo

11 January 2026; 14:05	Okayama Seagulls	0-3	PFU BlueCats Ishikawa Kahoku	Shigeto Arena Okayama, Okayama
11 January 2026; 14:05	17-25, 17-25, 15-25; Report			Shigeto Arena Okayama, Okayama

11 January 2026; 15:05	Toray Arrows Shiga	0-3	NEC Red Rockets Kawasaki	Shiga Daihatsu Arena, Shiga
11 January 2026; 15:05	14-25, 15-25, 17-25; Report			Shiga Daihatsu Arena, Shiga

=== Week 13 ===
- All times are Japan Standard Time (UTC+09:00).

17 January 2026; 13:05	Denso Airybees	3-1	Gunma Green Wings	Daisen Arena Nishio, Aichi
17 January 2026; 13:05	20-25, 25-17, 25-20, 25-16; Report			Daisen Arena Nishio, Aichi

17 January 2026; 14:05	Astemo Rivale Ibaraki	2-3	Saitama Ageo Medics	Ikenokawa Sakura Arena, Ibaraki
17 January 2026; 14:05	28-26, 25-18, 23-25, 28-30, 12-15; Report			Ikenokawa Sakura Arena, Ibaraki

17 January 2026; 14:05	NEC Red Rockets Kawasaki	3-2	Kurobe AquaFairies	Tokyu Dresser Todoroki Arena, Kanagawa
17 January 2026; 14:05	20-25, 25-16, 23-25, 25-13, 15-13; Report			Tokyu Dresser Todoroki Arena, Kanagawa

17 January 2026; 14:05	Victorina Himeji	0-3	PFU BlueCats Ishikawa Kahoku	Sun Arena Sendai, Kagoshima
17 January 2026; 14:05	14-25, 22-25, 20-25; Report			Sun Arena Sendai, Kagoshima

17 January 2026; 15:05	Toray Arrows Shiga	0-3	Aranmare Yamagata	Shiga Daihatsu Arena, Shiga
17 January 2026; 15:05	22-25, 19-25, 22-25; Report			Shiga Daihatsu Arena, Shiga

17 January 2026; 17:05	Osaka Marvelous	3-0	Okayama Seagulls	Asue Arena Osaka, Osaka
17 January 2026; 17:05	25-21, 25-21, 25-20; Report			Asue Arena Osaka, Osaka

17 January 2026; 18:05	Queenseis Kariya	2-3	Saga Hisamitsu Springs	Wing Arena Kariya, Aichi
17 January 2026; 18:05	18-25, 23-25, 25-22, 25-21, 12-15; Report			Wing Arena Kariya, Aichi

18 January 2026; 13:05	Denso Airybees	3-0	Gunma Green Wings	Daisen Arena Nishio, Aichi
18 January 2026; 13:05	25-22, 25-23, 25-21; Report			Daisen Arena Nishio, Aichi

18 January 2026; 13:05	NEC Red Rockets Kawasaki	3-0	Kurobe AquaFairies	Tokyu Dresser Todoroki Arena, Kanagawa
18 January 2026; 13:05	25-19, 25-13, 25-21; Report			Tokyu Dresser Todoroki Arena, Kanagawa

18 January 2026; 14:05	Astemo Rivale Ibaraki	0-3	Saitama Ageo Medics	Ikenokawa Sakura Arena, Ibaraki
18 January 2026; 14:05	24-26, 17-25, 19-25; Report			Ikenokawa Sakura Arena, Ibaraki

18 January 2026; 14:05	Queenseis Kariya	3-0	Saga Hisamitsu Springs	Wing Arena Kariya, Aichi
18 January 2026; 14:05	25-22, 31-29, 25-18; Report			Wing Arena Kariya, Aichi

18 January 2026; 14:05	Victorina Himeji	1-3	PFU BlueCats Ishikawa Kahoku	Sun Arena Sendai, Kagoshima
18 January 2026; 14:05	18-25, 15-25, 26-24, 16-25; Report			Sun Arena Sendai, Kagoshima

18 January 2026; 15:05	Toray Arrows Shiga	1-3	Aranmare Yamagata	Shiga Daihatsu Arena, Shiga
18 January 2026; 15:05	20-25, 25-17, 20-25, 28-30; Report			Shiga Daihatsu Arena, Shiga

18 January 2026; 17:05	Osaka Marvelous	3-1	Okayama Seagulls	Asue Arena Osaka, Osaka
18 January 2026; 17:05	19-25, 25-22, 25-12, 25-22; Report			Asue Arena Osaka, Osaka

=== Week 14 ===
- All times are Japan Standard Time (UTC+09:00).

24 January 2026; 12:05	Osaka Marvelous	3-2	Toray Arrows Shiga	Asue Arena Osaka, Osaka
24 January 2026; 12:05	19-25, 25-22, 23-25, 25-15, 15-11; Report			Asue Arena Osaka, Osaka

24 January 2026; 13:05	PFU BlueCats Ishikawa Kahoku	3-1	Gunma Green Wings	Toriyasaimiso BLUECATS ARENA, Ishikawa
24 January 2026; 13:05	25-16, 25-22, 23-25, 25-22; Report			Toriyasaimiso BLUECATS ARENA, Ishikawa

24 January 2026; 14:05	Aranmare Yamagata	0-3	Queenseis Kariya	Yamagata Prefectural Sports Park Arena, Yamagata
24 January 2026; 14:05	17-25, 18-25, 15-25; Report			Yamagata Prefectural Sports Park Arena, Yamagata

24 January 2026; 14:05	NEC Red Rockets Kawasaki	3-1	Astemo Rivale Ibaraki	Ota City General Gymnasium, Kanagawa
24 January 2026; 14:05	34-36, 25-22, 25-21, 25-16; Report			Ota City General Gymnasium, Kanagawa

24 January 2026; 14:05	Victorina Himeji	3-1	Saitama Ageo Medics	Victorina Wink Gymnasium, Hyogo
24 January 2026; 14:05	25-21, 25-22, 18-25, 25-21; Report			Victorina Wink Gymnasium, Hyogo

24 January 2026; 14:05	Okayama Seagulls	3-1	Kurobe AquaFairies	Shigeto Arena Okayama, Okayama
24 January 2026; 14:05	25-22, 29-27, 25-27, 25-21; Report			Shigeto Arena Okayama, Okayama

24 January 2026; 14:05	Saga Hisamitsu Springs	3-1	Denso Airybees	Saga Arena, Saga
24 January 2026; 14:05	25-15, 26-28, 25-19, 25-18; Report			Saga Arena, Saga

25 January 2026; 12:05	Osaka Marvelous	3-0	Toray Arrows Shiga	Asue Arena Osaka, Osaka
25 January 2026; 12:05	25-15, 25-23, 25-17; Report			Asue Arena Osaka, Osaka

25 January 2026; 13:05	Aranmare Yamagata	0-3	Queenseis Kariya	Yamagata Prefectural Sports Park Arena, Yamagata
25 January 2026; 13:05	12-25, 17-25, 27-29; Report			Yamagata Prefectural Sports Park Arena, Yamagata

25 January 2026; 13:05	NEC Red Rockets Kawasaki	2-3	Astemo Rivale Ibaraki	Ota City General Gymnasium, Kanagawa
25 January 2026; 13:05	26-24, 32-34, 25-18, 23-25, 9-15; Report			Ota City General Gymnasium, Kanagawa

25 January 2026; 13:05	PFU BlueCats Ishikawa Kahoku	1-3	Gunma Green Wings	Toriyasaimiso BLUECATS ARENA, Ishikawa
25 January 2026; 13:05	25-23, 22-25, 15-25, 21-25; Report			Toriyasaimiso BLUECATS ARENA, Ishikawa

25 January 2026; 14:05	Victorina Himeji	3-0	Saitama Ageo Medics	Victorina Wink Gymnasium, Hyogo
25 January 2026; 14:05	25-21, 25-23, 26-24; Report			Victorina Wink Gymnasium, Hyogo

25 January 2026; 14:05	Okayama Seagulls	1-3	Kurobe AquaFairies	Shigeto Arena Okayama, Okayama
25 January 2026; 14:05	22-25, 25-19, 15-25, 19-25; Report			Shigeto Arena Okayama, Okayama

25 January 2026; 14:05	Saga Hisamitsu Springs	3-2	Denso Airybees	Saga Arena, Saga
25 January 2026; 14:05	21-25, 25-21, 25-23, 25-27, 15-11; Report			Saga Arena, Saga

=== Week 15 ===
- All times are Japan Standard Time (UTC+09:00).

07 February 2026; 13:05	Denso Airybees	1-3	Victorina Himeji	Horaiya Bonds Arena, Fukushima
07 February 2026; 13:05	21-25, 34-32, 20-25, 22-25; Report			Horaiya Bonds Arena, Fukushima

07 February 2026; 13:05	Gunma Green Wings	0-3	Osaka Marvelous	Yamato Citizen Gymnasium Maebashi, Gunma
07 February 2026; 13:05	15-25, 20-25, 16-25; Report			Yamato Citizen Gymnasium Maebashi, Gunma

07 February 2026; 13:05	PFU BlueCats Ishikawa Kahoku	3-1	Saitama Ageo Medics	Toriyasaimiso BLUECATS ARENA, Ishikawa
07 February 2026; 13:05	23-25, 25-20, 25-23, 25-18; Report			Toriyasaimiso BLUECATS ARENA, Ishikawa

07 February 2026; 13:05	Queenseis Kariya	3-0	Okayama Seagulls	Sky Hall Toyota, Aichi
07 February 2026; 13:05	25-20, 27-25, 25-18; Report			Sky Hall Toyota, Aichi

07 February 2026; 14:05	Astemo Rivale Ibaraki	3-0	Aranmare Yamagata	Hitachinaka City Sports Park Total Gymnastics, Ibaraki
07 February 2026; 14:05	29-27, 25-15, 25-15; Report			Hitachinaka City Sports Park Total Gymnastics, Ibaraki

07 February 2026; 14:05	Kurobe AquaFairies	0-3	Toray Arrows Shiga	Kurobe City Gymnastics Center, Toyama
07 February 2026; 14:05	19-25, 19-25, 19-25; Report			Kurobe City Gymnastics Center, Toyama

07 February 2026; 14:05	Saga Hisamitsu Springs	2-3	NEC Red Rockets Kawasaki	Saga Arena, Saga
07 February 2026; 14:05	20-25, 25-18, 25-22, 22-25, 12-15; Report			Saga Arena, Saga

08 February 2026; 13:05	Denso Airybees	3-1	Victorina Himeji	Horaiya Bonds Arena, Fukushima
08 February 2026; 13:05	25-18, 25-20, 23-25, 25-20; Report			Horaiya Bonds Arena, Fukushima

08 February 2026; 13:05	Gunma Green Wings	3-1	Osaka Marvelous	Yamato Citizen Gymnasium Maebashi, Gunma
08 February 2026; 13:05	25-15, 22-25, 25-16, 25-21; Report			Yamato Citizen Gymnasium Maebashi, Gunma

08 February 2026; 13:05	PFU BlueCats Ishikawa Kahoku	3-0	Saitama Ageo Medics	Toriyasaimiso BLUECATS ARENA, Ishikawa
08 February 2026; 13:05	25-19, 25-18, 25-20; Report			Toriyasaimiso BLUECATS ARENA, Ishikawa

08 February 2026; 13:05	Queenseis Kariya	3-1	Okayama Seagulls	Sky Hall Toyota, Aichi
08 February 2026; 13:05	25-18, 22-25, 25-16, 25-12; Report			Sky Hall Toyota, Aichi

08 February 2026; 14:05	Astemo Rivale Ibaraki	3-0	Aranmare Yamagata	Hitachinaka City Sports Park Total Gymnastics, Ibaraki
08 February 2026; 14:05	25-21, 25'-22, 25-16; Report			Hitachinaka City Sports Park Total Gymnastics, Ibaraki

08 February 2026; 14:05	Kurobe AquaFairies	2-3	Toray Arrows Shiga	Kurobe City Gymnastics Center, Toyama
08 February 2026; 14:05	25-19, 19-25, 20-25, 25-21, 8-15; Report			Kurobe City Gymnastics Center, Toyama

08 February 2026; 14:05	Saga Hisamitsu Springs	3-2	NEC Red Rockets Kawasaki	Saga Arena, Saga
08 February 2026; 14:05	26-28, 25-20, 19-25, 25-22, 15-8; Report			Saga Arena, Saga

=== Week 16 ===
- All times are Japan Standard Time (UTC+09:00).

14 February 2026; 12:05	Victorina Himeji	3-0	Toray Arrows Shiga	Victorina Wink Gymnasium, Hyogo
14 February 2026; 12:05	25-13, 29-27, 25-19; Report			Victorina Wink Gymnasium, Hyogo

14 February 2026; 13:05	Gunma Green Wings	3-1	Kurobe AquaFairies	IO Shinkin Isezaki Arena, Gunma
14 February 2026; 13:05	25-17, 25-20, 21-25, 25-22; Report			IO Shinkin Isezaki Arena, Gunma

14 February 2026; 13:05	PFU BlueCats Ishikawa Kahoku	3-0	Queenseis Kariya	Toriyasaimiso BLUECATS ARENA, Ishikawa
14 February 2026; 13:05	25-23, 25-17, 25-19; Report			Toriyasaimiso BLUECATS ARENA, Ishikawa

14 February 2026; 14:05	Aranmare Yamagata	0-3	Osaka Marvelous	Yamagata Prefectural Sports Park Arena, Yamagata
14 February 2026; 14:05	18-25, 19-25, 23-25; Report			Yamagata Prefectural Sports Park Arena, Yamagata

14 February 2026; 14:05	NEC Red Rockets Kawasaki	3-2	Denso Airybees	Tokyu Dresser Todoroki Arena, Kanagawa
14 February 2026; 14:05	25-23, 21-25, 25-22, 23-25, 16-14; Report			Tokyu Dresser Todoroki Arena, Kanagawa

14 February 2026; 14:05	Okayama Seagulls	0-3	Astemo Rivale Ibaraki	Shigeto Arena Okayama, Okayama
14 February 2026; 14:05	22-25, 23-25, 24-26; Report			Shigeto Arena Okayama, Okayama

14 February 2026; 14:05	Saga Hisamitsu Springs	3-2	Saitama Ageo Medics	Saga Arena, Saga
14 February 2026; 14:05	25-22, 24-26, 20-25, 25-18, 15-10; Report			Saga Arena, Saga

15 February 2026; 12:05	Victorina Himeji	3-0	Toray Arrows Shiga	Victorina Wink Gymnasium, Hyogo
15 February 2026; 12:05	25-21, 25-11, 25-19; Report			Victorina Wink Gymnasium, Hyogo

15 February 2026; 13:05	Aranmare Yamagata	0-3	Osaka Marvelous	Yamagata Prefectural Sports Park Arena, Yamagata
15 February 2026; 13:05	16-25, 19-25, 19-25; Report			Yamagata Prefectural Sports Park Arena, Yamagata

15 February 2026; 13:05	Gunma Green Wings	0-3	Kurobe AquaFairies	IO Shinkin Isezaki Arena, Gunma
15 February 2026; 13:05	22-25, 23-25, 13-25; Report			IO Shinkin Isezaki Arena, Gunma

15 February 2026; 13:05	NEC Red Rockets Kawasaki	3-0	Denso Airybees	Tokyu Dresser Todoroki Arena, Kanagawa
15 February 2026; 13:05	26-24, 25-16, 34-32; Report			Tokyu Dresser Todoroki Arena, Kanagawa

15 February 2026; 13:05	PFU BlueCats Ishikawa Kahoku	1-3	Queenseis Kariya	Toriyasaimiso BLUECATS ARENA, Ishikawa
15 February 2026; 13:05	21-25, 19-25, 25-21, 20-25; Report			Toriyasaimiso BLUECATS ARENA, Ishikawa

15 February 2026; 14:05	Okayama Seagulls	1-3	Astemo Rivale Ibaraki	Shigeto Arena Okayama, Okayama
15 February 2026; 14:05	23-25, 25-17, 24-26, 20-25; Report			Shigeto Arena Okayama, Okayama

15 February 2026; 14:05	Saga Hisamitsu Springs	3-0	Saitama Ageo Medics	Saga Arena, Saga
15 February 2026; 14:05	25-19, 25-20, 25-22; Report			Saga Arena, Saga

=== Week 17 ===
- All times are Japan Standard Time (UTC+09:00).

28 February 2026; 13:05	Queenseis Kariya	3-1	Kurobe AquaFairies	Sogo Arena Yokkaichi, Aichi
28 February 2026; 13:05	25-21, 22-25, 25-22, 25-18; Report			Sogo Arena Yokkaichi, Aichi

28 February 2026; 14:05	Aranmare Yamagata	0-3	Victorina Himeji	Tsurushin Arena Komagihara, Yamagata
28 February 2026; 14:05	20-25, 22-25, 15-25; Report			Tsurushin Arena Komagihara, Yamagata

28 February 2026; 14:05	Astemo Rivale Ibaraki	2-3	PFU BlueCats Ishikawa Kahoku	Ikenokawa Sakura Arena, Ibaraki
28 February 2026; 14:05	25-15, 19-25, 20-25, 25-20, 11-15; Report			Ikenokawa Sakura Arena, Ibaraki

28 February 2026; 14:05	NEC Red Rockets Kawasaki	3-0	Gunma Green Wings	Tokyu Dresser Todoroki Arena, Kanagawa
28 February 2026; 14:05	25-22, 25-17, 27-25; Report			Tokyu Dresser Todoroki Arena, Kanagawa

28 February 2026; 14:05	Osaka Marvelous	3-0	Saitama Ageo Medics	Ota City General Gymnasium, Tokyo
28 February 2026; 14:05	25-20, 25-21, 25-15; Report			Ota City General Gymnasium, Tokyo

28 February 2026; 14:05	Okayama Seagulls	1-3	Denso Airybees	Shigeto Arena Okayama, Okayama
28 February 2026; 14:05	25-19, 22-25, 18-25, 19-25; Report			Shigeto Arena Okayama, Okayama

28 February 2026; 15:05	Toray Arrows Shiga	0-3	Saga Hisamitsu Springs	Shiga Daihatsu Arena, Shiga
28 February 2026; 15:05	22-25, 14-25, 21-25; Report			Shiga Daihatsu Arena, Shiga

01 March 2026; 13:05	Aranmare Yamagata	0-3	Victorina Himeji	Tsurushin Arena Komagihara, Yamagata
01 March 2026; 13:05	24-26, 12-25, 20-25; Report			Tsurushin Arena Komagihara, Yamagata

01 March 2026; 13:05	NEC Red Rockets Kawasaki	3-1	Gunma Green Wings	Tokyu Dresser Todoroki Arena, Kanagawa
01 March 2026; 13:05	25-21, 21-25, 25-21, 25-20; Report			Tokyu Dresser Todoroki Arena, Kanagawa

01 March 2026; 13:05	Queenseis Kariya	3-0	Kurobe AquaFairies	Sogo Arena Yokkaichi, Aichi
01 March 2026; 13:05	26-24, 25-19, 25-20; Report			Sogo Arena Yokkaichi, Aichi

01 March 2026; 13:05	Okayama Seagulls	1-3	Denso Airybees	Shigeto Arena Okayama, Okayama
01 March 2026; 13:05	22-25, 25-20, 24-26, 22-25; Report			Shigeto Arena Okayama, Okayama

01 March 2026; 14:05	Astemo Rivale Ibaraki	1-3	PFU BlueCats Ishikawa Kahoku	Ikenokawa Sakura Arena, Ibaraki
01 March 2026; 14:05	25-27, 20-25, 31-29, 14-25; Report			Ikenokawa Sakura Arena, Ibaraki

01 March 2026; 14:05	Osaka Marvelous	3-0	Saitama Ageo Medics	Ota City General Gymnasium, Tokyo
01 March 2026; 14:05	25-15, 25-19, 25-21; Report			Ota City General Gymnasium, Tokyo

01 March 2026; 15:05	Toray Arrows Shiga	0-3	Saga Hisamitsu Springs	Shiga Daihatsu Arena, Shiga
01 March 2026; 15:05	18-25, 21-25, 21-25; Report			Shiga Daihatsu Arena, Shiga

=== Week 18 ===
- All times are Japan Standard Time (UTC+09:00).

07 March 2026; 13:05	Denso Airybees	3-2	Aranmare Yamagata	Daisen Arena Nishio, Aichi
07 March 2026; 13:05	25-21, 21-25, 25-15, 20-25, 15-9; Report			Daisen Arena Nishio, Aichi

07 March 2026; 13:05	PFU BlueCats Ishikawa Kahoku	3-2	NEC Red Rockets Kawasaki	Toriyasaimiso BLUECATS ARENA, Ishikawa
07 March 2026; 13:05	24-26, 26-24, 25-21, 16-25, 15-9; Report			Toriyasaimiso BLUECATS ARENA, Ishikawa

07 March 2026; 13:05	Queenseis Kariya	3-2	Osaka Marvelous	Kariya City Gymnasium, Aichi
07 March 2026; 13:05	22-25, 23-25, 25-23, 25-22, 15-11; Report			Kariya City Gymnasium, Aichi

07 March 2026; 14:05	Astemo Rivale Ibaraki	1-3	Saga Hisamitsu Springs	Ikenokawa Sakura Arena, Ibaraki
07 March 2026; 14:05	27-29, 25-17, 19-25, 23-25; Report			Ikenokawa Sakura Arena, Ibaraki

07 March 2026; 14:05	Kurobe AquaFairies	1-3	Saitama Ageo Medics	Kurobe City Gymnastics Center, Toyama
07 March 2026; 14:05	17-25, 19-25, 35-33, 22-25; Report			Kurobe City Gymnastics Center, Toyama

07 March 2026; 14:05	Victorina Himeji	3-0	Okayama Seagulls	Victorina Wink Gymnasium, Hyogo
07 March 2026; 14:05	25-21, 25-18, 25-19; Report			Victorina Wink Gymnasium, Hyogo

07 March 2026; 15:05	Toray Arrows Shiga	2-3	Gunma Green Wings	Kusatsu City Shiga Toyota Arena, Shiga
07 March 2026; 15:05	25-23, 15-25, 25-19, 22-25, 17-19; Report			Kusatsu City Shiga Toyota Arena, Shiga

08 March 2026; 13:05	Denso Airybees	3-0	Aranmare Yamagata	Daisen Arena Nishio, Aichi
08 March 2026; 13:05	25-23, 25-20, 25-20; Report			Daisen Arena Nishio, Aichi

08 March 2026; 13:05	PFU BlueCats Ishikawa Kahoku	1-3	NEC Red Rockets Kawasaki	Toriyasaimiso BLUECATS ARENA, Ishikawa
08 March 2026; 13:05	33-35, 25-20, 22-25, 21-25; Report			Toriyasaimiso BLUECATS ARENA, Ishikawa

08 March 2026; 13:05	Queenseis Kariya	2-3	Osaka Marvelous	Kariya City Gymnasium, Aichi
08 March 2026; 13:05	17-25, 25-17, 21-25, 25-23, 11-15; Report			Kariya City Gymnasium, Aichi

08 March 2026; 14:05	Astemo Rivale Ibaraki	2-3	Saga Hisamitsu Springs	Ikenokawa Sakura Arena, Ibaraki
08 March 2026; 14:05	25-21, 21-25, 25-19, 15-25, 13-15; Report			Ikenokawa Sakura Arena, Ibaraki

08 March 2026; 14:05	Kurobe AquaFairies	2-3	Saitama Ageo Medics	Kurobe City Gymnastics Center, Toyama
08 March 2026; 14:05	25-22, 25-20, 22-25, 23-25, 11-15; Report			Kurobe City Gymnastics Center, Toyama

08 March 2026; 14:05	Victorina Himeji	3-0	Okayama Seagulls	Victorina Wink Gymnasium, Hyogo
08 March 2026; 14:05	25-14, 25-22, 25-14; Report			Victorina Wink Gymnasium, Hyogo

08 March 2026; 15:05	Toray Arrows Shiga	2-3	Gunma Green Wings	Kusatsu City Shiga Toyota Arena, Shiga
08 March 2026; 15:05	10-25, 25-19, 25-23, 11-25, 8-15; Report			Kusatsu City Shiga Toyota Arena, Shiga

=== Week 19 ===
- All times are Japan Standard Time (UTC+09:00).

14 March 2026; 13:05	Denso Airybees	1-3	PFU BlueCats Ishikawa Kahoku	Horaiya Bonds Arena, Fukushima
14 March 2026; 13:05	25-13, 26-28, 17-25, 22-25; Report			Horaiya Bonds Arena, Fukushima

14 March 2026; 13:05	Gunma Green Wings	3-1	Okayama Seagulls	Yamato Citizen Gymnasium Maebashi, Gunma
14 March 2026; 13:05	21-25, 25-22, 25-16, 25-20; Report			Yamato Citizen Gymnasium Maebashi, Gunma

14 March 2026; 13:05	Saitama Ageo Medics	3-1	Toray Arrows Shiga	Lipro Martial Arts Arena, Saitama
14 March 2026; 13:05	25-17, 21-25, 25-8, 25-20; Report			Lipro Martial Arts Arena, Saitama

14 March 2026; 14:05	Aranmare Yamagata	0-3	Kurobe AquaFairies	Yamagata Prefectural Sports Park Arena, Yamagata
14 March 2026; 14:05	21-25, 17-25, 18-25; Report			Yamagata Prefectural Sports Park Arena, Yamagata

14 March 2026; 14:05	Astemo Rivale Ibaraki	0-3	Queenseis Kariya	CNA Arena Akita, Akita
14 March 2026; 14:05	18-25, 18-25, 25-27; Report			CNA Arena Akita, Akita

14 March 2026; 14:05	Osaka Marvelous	0-3	NEC Red Rockets Kawasaki	Green Arena Kobe, Hyogo
14 March 2026; 14:05	20-25, 16-25, 24-26; Report			Green Arena Kobe, Hyogo

14 March 2026; 14:05	Saga Hisamitsu Springs	2-3	Victorina Himeji	Saga Arena, Saga
14 March 2026; 14:05	20-25, 18-25, 25-19, 25-19, 11-15; Report			Saga Arena, Saga

15 March 2026; 13:05	Aranmare Yamagata	0-3	Kurobe AquaFairies	Yamagata Prefectural Sports Park Arena, Yamagata
15 March 2026; 13:05	13-25, 18-25, 13-25; Report			Yamagata Prefectural Sports Park Arena, Yamagata

15 March 2026; 13:05	Denso Airybees	0-3	PFU BlueCats Ishikawa Kahoku	Horaiya Bonds Arena, Fukushima
15 March 2026; 13:05	19-25, 14-25, 20-25; Report			Horaiya Bonds Arena, Fukushima

15 March 2026; 13:05	Gunma Green Wings	3-0	Okayama Seagulls	Yamato Citizen Gymnasium Maebashi, Gunma
15 March 2026; 13:05	25-23, 25-22, 25-22; Report			Yamato Citizen Gymnasium Maebashi, Gunma

15 March 2026; 13:05	Saitama Ageo Medics	3-0	Toray Arrows Shiga	Lipro Martial Arts Arena, Saitama
15 March 2026; 13:05	25-13, 25-20, 25-23; Report			Lipro Martial Arts Arena, Saitama

15 March 2026; 14:05	Astemo Rivale Ibaraki	1-3	Queenseis Kariya	CNA Arena Akita, Akita
15 March 2026; 14:05	25-22, 17-25, 19-25, 17-25; Report			CNA Arena Akita, Akita

15 March 2026; 14:05	Osaka Marvelous	3-2	NEC Red Rockets Kawasaki	Green Arena Kobe, Hyogo
15 March 2026; 14:05	25-22, 21-25, 24-26, 25-19, 16-14; Report			Green Arena Kobe, Hyogo

15 March 2026; 14:05	Saga Hisamitsu Springs	3-1	Victorina Himeji	Saga Arena, Saga
15 March 2026; 14:05	23-25, 25-17, 28-26, 25-18; Report			Saga Arena, Saga

=== Week 20 ===
- All times are Japan Standard Time (UTC+09:00).

20 March 2026; 14:05	Osaka Marvelous	0-3	Denso Airybees	Kobe Tokiwa Arena, Hyogo
20 March 2026; 14:05	25-27, 24-26, 22-25; Report			Kobe Tokiwa Arena, Hyogo

21 March 2026; 14:05	Osaka Marvelous	2-3	Denso Airybees	Kobe Tokiwa Arena, Hyogo
21 March 2026; 14:05	25-22, 20-25, 21-25, 25-23, 12-15; Report			Kobe Tokiwa Arena, Hyogo

21 March 2026; 14:05	Aranmare Yamagata	0-3	PFU BlueCats Ishikawa Kahoku	INPEX Sakata Arena, Yamagata
21 March 2026; 14:05	20-25, 14-25, 22-25; Report			INPEX Sakata Arena, Yamagata

21 March 2026; 14:05	NEC Red Rockets Kawasaki	3-1	Victorina Himeji	Ota City General Gymnasium, Tokyo
21 March 2026; 14:05	20-25, 25-23, 26-24, 25-20; Report			Ota City General Gymnasium, Tokyo

21 March 2026; 14:05	Kurobe AquaFairies	1-3	Astemo Rivale Ibaraki	Ariso Dome, Toyama
21 March 2026; 14:05	25-27, 25-21, 22-25, 22-25; Report			Ariso Dome, Toyama

21 March 2026; 14:05	Saga Hisamitsu Springs	3-0	Gunma Green Wings	HAPPINESS ARENA, Nagasaki
21 March 2026; 14:05	25-20, 25-19, 25-18; Report			HAPPINESS ARENA, Nagasaki

21 March 2026; 15:05	Toray Arrows Shiga	0-3	Okayama Seagulls	Shiga Daihatsu Arena, Shiga
21 March 2026; 15:05	21-25, 10-25, 12-25; Report			Shiga Daihatsu Arena, Shiga

21 March 2026; 18:05	Queenseis Kariya	0-3	Saitama Ageo Medics	Wing Arena Kariya, Aichi
21 March 2026; 18:05	18-25, 19-25, 28-30; Report			Wing Arena Kariya, Aichi

22 March 2026; 13:05	Aranmare Yamagata	0-3	PFU BlueCats Ishikawa Kahoku	INPEX Sakata Arena, Yamagata
22 March 2026; 13:05	20-25, 20-25, 20-25; Report			INPEX Sakata Arena, Yamagata

22 March 2026; 13:05	NEC Red Rockets Kawasaki	3-0	Victorina Himeji	Ota City General Gymnasium, Tokyo
22 March 2026; 13:05	25-18, 25-22, 25-22; Report			Ota City General Gymnasium, Tokyo

22 March 2026; 14:05	Kurobe AquaFairies	1-3	Astemo Rivale Ibaraki	Ariso Dome, Toyama
22 March 2026; 14:05	28-30, 21-25, 25-14, 18-25; Report			Ariso Dome, Toyama

22 March 2026; 14:05	Saga Hisamitsu Springs	3-2	Gunma Green Wings	HAPPINESS ARENA, Nagasaki
22 March 2026; 14:05	18-25, 25-15, 25-22, 21-25, 15-13; Report			HAPPINESS ARENA, Nagasaki

22 March 2026; 15:05	Queenseis Kariya	2-3	Saitama Ageo Medics	Wing Arena Kariya, Aichi
22 March 2026; 15:05	25-23, 20-25, 22-25, 25-23, 11-15; Report			Wing Arena Kariya, Aichi

22 March 2026; 15:05	Toray Arrows Shiga	1-3	Okayama Seagulls	Shiga Daihatsu Arena, Shiga
22 March 2026; 15:05	21-25, 18-25, 25-22, 15-25; Report			Shiga Daihatsu Arena, Shiga

=== Week 21 ===
- All times are Japan Standard Time (UTC+09:00).

28 March 2026; 13:05	Gunma Green Wings	3-0	Aranmare Yamagata	OPEN HOUSE ARENA OTA, Gunma
28 March 2026; 13:05	25-20, 25-22, 25-22; Report			OPEN HOUSE ARENA OTA, Gunma

28 March 2026; 13:05	Saitama Ageo Medics	3-2	Denso Airybees	Hasuda City Civic Gymnasium Palthy, Saitama
28 March 2026; 13:05	23-25, 25-22, 22-25, 25-20, 15-13; Report			Hasuda City Civic Gymnasium Palthy, Saitama

28 March 2026; 13:05	PFU BlueCats Ishikawa Kahoku	2-3	Kurobe AquaFairies	Toriyasaimiso BLUECATS ARENA, Ishikawa
28 March 2026; 13:05	25-18, 21-25, 25-19, 20-25, 12-15; Report			Toriyasaimiso BLUECATS ARENA, Ishikawa

28 March 2026; 14:05	Astemo Rivale Ibaraki	1-3	Osaka Marveleous	Hitachinaka City Sports Park Total Gymnastics, Ibaraki
28 March 2026; 14:05	25-23, 22-25, 18-25, 24-26; Report			Hitachinaka City Sports Park Total Gymnastics, Ibaraki

28 March 2026; 14:05	NEC Red Rockets Kawasaki	3-0	Toray Arrows Shiga	Tokyu Dresser Todoroki Arena, Kanagawa
28 March 2026; 14:05	25-19, 25-15, 25-20; Report			Tokyu Dresser Todoroki Arena, Kanagawa

28 March 2026; 14:05	Victorina Himeji	2-3	Queenseis Kariya	Victorina Wink Gymnasium, Hyogo
28 March 2026; 14:05	25-17, 25-23, 22-25, 18-25, 8-15; Report			Victorina Wink Gymnasium, Hyogo

28 March 2026; 14:05	Okayama Seagulls	0-3	Saga Hisamitsu Springs	Shigeto Arena Okayama, Okayama
28 March 2026; 14:05	26-28, 19-25, 20-25; Report			Shigeto Arena Okayama, Okayama

29 March 2026; 13:05	Saitama Ageo Medics	0-3	Denso Airybees	Hasuda City Civic Gymnasium Palthy, Saitama
29 March 2026; 13:05	15-25, 21-25, 21-25; Report			Hasuda City Civic Gymnasium Palthy, Saitama

29 March 2026; 13:05	NEC Red Rockets Kawasaki	3-2	Toray Arrows Shiga	Tokyu Dresser Todoroki Arena, Kanagawa
29 March 2026; 13:05	21-25, 25-17, 21-25, 25-20, 15-13; Report			Tokyu Dresser Todoroki Arena, Kanagawa

29 March 2026; 13:05	PFU BlueCats Ishikawa Kahoku	3-0	Kurobe AquaFairies	Toriyasaimiso BLUECATS ARENA, Ishikawa
29 March 2026; 13:05	25-12, 25-20, 25-20; Report			Toriyasaimiso BLUECATS ARENA, Ishikawa

29 March 2026; 13:06	Gunma Green Wings	3-0	Aranmare Yamagata	OPEN HOUSE ARENA OTA, Gunma
29 March 2026; 13:06	25-23, 25-15, 25-18; Report			OPEN HOUSE ARENA OTA, Gunma

29 March 2026; 14:05	Astemo Rivale Ibaraki	3-1	Osaka Marveleous	Hitachinaka City Sports Park Total Gymnastics, Ibaraki
29 March 2026; 14:05	25-20, 25-21, 22-25, 25-22; Report			Hitachinaka City Sports Park Total Gymnastics, Ibaraki

29 March 2026; 14:05	Victorina Himeji	3-1	Queenseis Kariya	Victorina Wink Gymnasium, Hyogo
29 March 2026; 14:05	25-22, 20-25, 25-20, 25-20; Report			Victorina Wink Gymnasium, Hyogo

29 March 2026; 14:05	Okayama Seagulls	1-3	Saga Hisamitsu Springs	Shigeto Arena Okayama, Okayama
29 March 2026; 14:05	25-22, 17-25, 23-25, 15-25; Report			Shigeto Arena Okayama, Okayama

=== Week 22 ===
04 April 2026; 13:05	Denso Airybees	3-1	Astemo Rivale Ibaraki	Fukushima Toyota Crown Arena, Fukushima
04 April 2026; 13:05	25-15, 25-22, 20-25, 25-23; Report			Fukushima Toyota Crown Arena, Fukushima

04 April 2026; 13:05	Gunma Green Wings	3-1	Victorina Himeji	Yamato Citizen Gymnasium Maebashi, Gunma
04 April 2026; 13:05	25-21, 15-25, 25-19, 25-19; Report			Yamato Citizen Gymnasium Maebashi, Gunma

04 April 2026; 13:05	Saitama Ageo Medics	3-2	Okayama Seagulls	Tokorozawa Citizen Gymnasium, Saitama
04 April 2026; 13:05	25-19, 16-25, 25-19, 21-25, 15-13; Report			Tokorozawa Citizen Gymnasium, Saitama

04 April 2026; 14:05	Kurobe AquaFairies	0-3	Osaka Marvelous	Kurobe City Gymnastics Center, Toyama
04 April 2026; 14:05	25-27, 21-25, 18-25; Report			Kurobe City Gymnastics Center, Toyama

04 April 2026; 14:05	Queenseis Kariya	3-0	NEC Red Rockets Kawasaki	Sky Hall Toyota, Aichi
04 April 2026; 14:05	25-21, 25-23, 26-24; Report			Sky Hall Toyota, Aichi

04 April 2026; 14:05	Saga Hisamitsu Springs	3-0	Aranmare Yamagata	Saga Arena, Saga
04 April 2026; 14:05	25-20, 25-12, 25-20; Report			Saga Arena, Saga

04 April 2026; 15:05	Toray Arrows Shiga	2-3	PFU BlueCats Ishikawa Kahoku	Kusatsu City Shiga Toyota Arena, Shiga
04 April 2026; 15:05	25-27, 18-25, 25-23, 25-20, 11-15; Report			Kusatsu City Shiga Toyota Arena, Shiga

05 April 2026; 13:05	Denso Airybees	1-3	Astemo Rivale Ibaraki	Fukushima Toyota Crown Arena, Fukushima
05 April 2026; 13:05	22-25, 25-20, 19-25, 22-25; Report			Fukushima Toyota Crown Arena, Fukushima

05 April 2026; 13:05	Gunma Green Wings	0-3	Victorina Himeji	Yamato Citizen Gymnasium Maebashi, Gunma
05 April 2026; 13:05	15-25, 21-25, 19-25; Report			Yamato Citizen Gymnasium Maebashi, Gunma

05 April 2026; 13:05	Saitama Ageo Medics	1-3	Okayama Seagulls	Tokorozawa Citizen Gymnasium, Saitama
05 April 2026; 13:05	20-25, 21-25, 25-23, 16-25; Report			Tokorozawa Citizen Gymnasium, Saitama

05 April 2026; 13:05	Queenseis Kariya	3-0	NEC Red Rockets Kawasaki	Sky Hall Toyota, Aichi
05 April 2026; 13:05	28-26, 25-13, 25-19; Report			Sky Hall Toyota, Aichi

05 April 2026; 14:05	Kurobe AquaFairies	0-3	Osaka Marvelous	Kurobe City Gymnastics Center, Toyama
05 April 2026; 14:05	23-25, 21-25, 22-25; Report			Kurobe City Gymnastics Center, Toyama

05 April 2026; 14:05	Saga Hisamitsu Springs	3-0	Aranmare Yamagata	Saga Arena, Saga
05 April 2026; 14:05	25-17, 25-18, 32-30; Report			Saga Arena, Saga

04 April 2026; 15:05	Toray Arrows Shiga	1-3	PFU BlueCats Ishikawa Kahoku	Kusatsu City Shiga Toyota Arena, Shiga
04 April 2026; 15:05	20-25, 17-25, 25-23, 20-25; Report			Kusatsu City Shiga Toyota Arena, Shiga

== Final round ==
- All times are Japan Standard Time (UTC+09:00).

Quarterfinals
10-11 April
NEC Red Rockets Kawasaki	2
Saitama Ageo Medics	0
11-12 April
Osaka Marvelous	2
Victorina Himeji	0
11-12 April
Saga Hisamitsu Springs	2
Gunma Green Wings	0
11-12 April
PFU BlueCats Ishikawa Kahoku	2
Queenseis Kariya	0

Semifinals
17-18 April
NEC Red Rockets Kawasaki	0
Osaka Marvelous	2
18-20 April
Saga Hisamitsu Springs	2
PFU BlueCats Ishikawa Kahoku	1

Final
25-26 April
Saga Hisamitsu Springs	2
Osaka Marvelous	0

=== Quarterfinals ===
10 April 2026; 19:05	NEC Red Rockets Kawasaki	3-1	Saitama Ageo Medics	Tokyu Dresser Todoroki Arena, Kanagawa
10 April 2026; 19:05	25-23, 25-15, 13-25, 25-21; Report			Tokyu Dresser Todoroki Arena, Kanagawa

11 April 2026; 13:05	PFU BlueCats Ishikawa Kahoku	3-1	Queenseis Kariya	Toriyasaimiso BLUECATS ARENA, Ishikawa
11 April 2026; 13:05	25-19, 20-25, 25-16, 25-20; Report			Toriyasaimiso BLUECATS ARENA, Ishikawa

11 April 2026; 14:05	Saga Hisamitsu Springs	3-0	Gunma Green Wings	Salon Pas Arena, Saga
11 April 2026; 14:05	25-20, 25-18, 25-18; Report			Salon Pas Arena, Saga

11 April 2026; 14:05	Osaka Marvelous	3-1	Victorina Himeji	Green Arena Kobe, Hyogo
11 April 2026; 14:05	24-26, 25-20, 25-22, 25-23; Report			Green Arena Kobe, Hyogo

11 April 2026; 16:05	NEC Red Rockets Kawasaki	3-0	Saitama Ageo Medics	Tokyu Dresser Todoroki Arena, Kanagawa
11 April 2026; 16:05	25-18, 25-19, 25-15; Report			Tokyu Dresser Todoroki Arena, Kanagawa

12 April 2026; 13:05	PFU BlueCats Ishikawa Kahoku	3-0	Queenseis Kariya	Toriyasaimiso BLUECATS ARENA, Ishikawa
12 April 2026; 13:05	25-18, 30-28, 25-18; Report			Toriyasaimiso BLUECATS ARENA, Ishikawa

12 April 2026; 14:05	Saga Hisamitsu Springs	3-0	Gunma Green Wings	Salon Pas Arena, Saga
12 April 2026; 14:05	26-24, 25-20, 20-14; Report			Salon Pas Arena, Saga

12 April 2026; 14:05	Osaka Marvelous	3-1	Victorina Himeji	Green Arena Kobe, Hyogo
12 April 2026; 14:05	25-21, 25-20, 16-25, 22-25, 11-15; Report			Green Arena Kobe, Hyogo

=== Semifinals ===
17 April 2026; 19:05	NEC Red Rockets Kawasaki	0-3	Osaka Marvelous	Tokyu Dresser Todoroki Arena, Kanagawa
17 April 2026; 19:05	20-25, 19-25, 18-25; Report			Tokyu Dresser Todoroki Arena, Kanagawa

18 April 2026; 14:05	Saga Hisamitsu Springs	1-3	PFU BlueCats Ishikawa Kahoku	Saga Arena, Saga
18 April 2026; 14:05	19-25, 25-19, 18-25, 17-25; Report			Saga Arena, Saga

18 April 2026; 16:05	NEC Red Rockets Kawasaki	0-3	Osaka Marvelous	Tokyu Dresser Todoroki Arena, Kanagawa
18 April 2026; 16:05	19-25, 23-25, 15-25; Report			Tokyu Dresser Todoroki Arena, Kanagawa

19 April 2026; 14:05	Saga Hisamitsu Springs	3-2	PFU BlueCats Ishikawa Kahoku	Saga Arena, Saga
19 April 2026; 14:05	24-26, 26-24, 25-17, 21-25, 15-12; Report			Saga Arena, Saga

20 April 2026; 19:05	Saga Hisamitsu Springs	3-2	PFU BlueCats Ishikawa Kahoku	Saga Arena, Saga
20 April 2026; 19:05	18-25, 25-27, 25-22, 25-19, 15-11; Report			Saga Arena, Saga

=== Final ===
25 April 2026; 13:35	Saga Hisamitsu Springs	3-2	Osaka Marvelous	Yokohama Buntai, Kanagawa
25 April 2026; 13:35	25-21, 28-26, 19-25, 22-25, 15-10; Report			Yokohama Buntai, Kanagawa

26 April 2026; 16:05	Saga Hisamitsu Springs	3-0	Osaka Marvelous	Yokohama Buntai, Kanagawa
26 April 2026; 16:05	25-20, 25-23, 25-14; Report			Yokohama Buntai, Kanagawa

== Final Ranking ==
Rank	Club
1st place, gold medalist(s)	SAGA Hisamitsu Springs
2nd place, silver medalist(s)	Osaka Marvelous
3rd place, bronze medalist(s)	NEC Red Rockets Kawasaki
4	PFU BlueCats ISHIKAWA KAHOKU
5	VICTORINA HIMEJI
6	QUEENSEIS KARIYA
7	GUNMA GREEN WINGS
8	SAITAMA AGEO MEDICS
9	DENSO AIRYBEES
10	Astemo Rivale Ibaraki
11	KUROBE AQUA FAIRIES
12	OKAYAMA SEAGULLS
13	TORAY ARROWS SHIGA
14	Aranmare YAMAGATA

2025–26 SV.League Women's Champions
Team roster	Setter: Manami Mandai, Aki Momii, Erika Sakae Libero: Minami Nishimura, Kokoro Semba, Aoi Takahashi; MB: Ayaka Araki, Shion Hirayama, Miina Inoue, Haruka Yamashita, Hattaya Bamrungsuk; OP: Stephanie Samedy, Mika Yoshitake; OH: Ayane Kitamado, Sae Nakajima, Megumi Fukazawa, Meika Ogino, Julie Lengweiler
Head Coach	Kumi Nakada

Source: SV.League - Final Ranking

== Awards ==
Awards	Name of the Awards	Name of the Winner	Team Name	Records
Club Award	SV.League Champion	Saga Hisamitsu Springs		
Club Award	SV.League Runners-up	Osaka Marvelous		
Club Award	Championship Final Four-T	Saga Hisamitsu Springs		
Club Award	Championship Final Four-B	PFU BlueCats Ishikawa Kahoku		
Club Award	Regular Season Winners	NEC Red Rockets Kawasaki		
Club Award	Best Youth Scheme	Saga Hisamitsu Springs		
Club Award	Best Community Engagement Award	PFU BlueCats Ishikawa Kahoku		
Club Award	Best Community Engagement Award	Toray Arrows Shiga		
Leaders Award	Top Scorer	(Poland) Olivia Różański	Gunma Green Wings	1028 pts.
Leaders Award	Top Spiker	(Japan) Ayaka Araki	Saga Hisamitsu Springs	52.8%
Leaders Award	Top Server	(Netherlands) Juliet Lohuis	Toray Arrows Shiga	16.9%
Leaders Award	Top Blocker	(United States) Brionne Butler	Astemo Rivale Ibaraki	0.92/set
Leaders Award	Top Serve Receiver	(Japan) Minami Nishimura	Saga Hisamitsu Springs	55.6%
Individual Award	Regular Season MVP	(Japan) Yoshino Sato	NEC Red Rockets Kawasaki	
Individual Award	Best Six	(Italy) Sylvia Nwakalor	NEC Red Rockets Kawasaki	
Individual Award	Best Six	(Poland) Olivia Różański	Gunma Green Wings	
Individual Award	Best Six	(Japan) Yoshino Sato	NEC Red Rockets Kawasaki	
Individual Award	Best Six	(Japan) Ayaka Araki	Saga Hisamitsu Springs	
Individual Award	Best Six	(Thailand) Thatdao Nuekjang	PFU BlueCats Ishikawa Kahoku	
Individual Award	Best Six	(Japan) Tamaki Matsui	PFU BlueCats Ishikawa Kahoku	
Individual Award	Libero of the Year	(Japan) Minami Nishimura	Saga Hisamitsu Springs	
Individual Award	Receiver of the Year	(Japan) Kotona Hayashi	Osaka Marvelous	
Individual Award	Head Coach of the Year	(Japan) Kodai Nakaya	NEC Red Rockets Kawasaki	
Individual Award	Championship MVP	(Japan) Minami Nishimura	Saga Hisamitsu Springs	
Individual Award	Rookie of the Year	(Japan) Chisato Hanaoka	Toray Arrows Shiga	
Individual Award	Fair Play Prize	(Germany) Lena Stigrot	Kurobe AquaFairies	
Individual Award	Most Impressive Player	(Poland) Olivia Różański	Gunma Green Wings	
Special Award		(Japan) Ai Kurogo	Saitama Ageo Medics	

Source: SV.League - Award

== Statistics leaders ==
Best Scorers
	Player	Team	Attacks	Blocks	Serves	Total
1	(Poland) Olivia Różański	Gunma Green Wings	932	63	33	1028
2	(United States) Mackenzie May	Astemo Rivale Ibaraki	839	45	52	936
3	(United States) Stephanie Samedy	Saga Hisamitsu Springs	773	47	26	846
4	(Italy) Camilla Mingardi	Victorina Himeji	762	43	13	818
5	(Brazil) Rosamaria Montibeller	Denso Airybees	728	60	17	805

Best Attackers
	Player	Team	Attempts	Points	Errors	Success
1	(Japan) Ayaka Araki	Saga Hisamitsu Springs	568	300	23	52.8%
2	(Thailand) Thatdao Nuekjang	PFU BlueCats Ishikawa Kahoku	534	273	21	51.1%
3	(Bulgaria) Nasya Dimitrova	Gunma Green Wings	726	351	39	48.3%
4	(United States) Brionne Butler	Astemo Rivale Ibaraki	549	265	32	48.3%
5	(Italy) Sylvia Nwakalor	NEC Red Rockets Kawasaki	1239	584	90	47.1%

Best Blockers
	Player	Team	Set	Points	Per Set
1	(United States) Brionne Butler	Astemo Rivale Ibaraki	156	143	0.92
2	(Japan) Maki Yamaguchi	Kurobe AquaFairies	165	136	0.82
3	(Bulgaria) Mira Todorova	Victorina Himeji	149	120	0.81
4	(Bulgaria) Nasya Dimitrova	Gunma Green Wings	166	113	0.68
5	(Thailand) Thatdao Nuekjang	PFU BlueCats Ishikawa Kahoku	120	80	0.67

Best Servers
	Player	Team	Aces	Errors	Effects	Attempts	Effect %
1	(Netherlands) Juliet Lohuis	Toray Arrows Shiga	30	45	198	405	16.9%
2	(United States) Mackenzie May	Astemo Rivale Ibaraki	52	95	347	734	15.7%
3	(Japan) Rui Nonaka	Victorina Himeji	29	42	291	609	15.0%
4	(United States) Danielle Cuttino	Queenseis Kariya	22	33	165	373	14.7%
5	(Thailand) Wimonrat Thanapan	Aranmare Yamagata	27	40	153	375	14.7%

Best Receivers
	Player	Team	Perfect	Positive	Fail	Attempts	Positive %
1	(Japan) Minami Nishimura	Saga Hisamitsu Springs	261	178	190	629	55.6%
2	(Japan) Haruna Kawabata	Denso Airybees	385	215	302	902	54.6%
3	(Japan) Ayami Urayama	Kurobe AquaFairies	224	163	187	574	53.2%
4	(Japan) Sayaka Daikuzono	NEC Red Rockets Kawasaki	176	148	155	479	52.2%
5	(Japan) Haruka Nakamura	Queenseis Kariya	233	178	220	631	51.0%

Source: SV.League - Individual Ranking

== See Also ==
2025-26 SV.League Men's
