= Gunma Green Wings =

Japanese volleyball club

- Founded: 1975
- Ground: Maebashi, Gunma, Japan.
- Chairman: (Japan) Nobuyuki Horie
- Manager Head coach: (Japan) Kimihiko Sato (Japan) Masayasu Sakamoto
- Captain: (Japan) Minami Takaso
- League: SV.League
- 2025/26: 7th
- Website: Club home page

Gunma Green Wings (群馬グリーンウイングス) is a women's volleyball team based in Maebashi City, Gunma Prefecture, Japan. The team competed in the SV.League. The owner of the team is Gunma Bank.

== History ==
The Gunma Bank Volleyball Club was founded in 1975 as 9-a-side volleyball club.

In 2015, the team was fully transitioned to 6-a-side volleyball and joined the V.Challenge League 2 from the 2015/16 season.

On October 1, 2023, the team was rebranding as "Gunma Green Wings" and took part in SV.League from 2024 to 2025 season.

In their first season in the top volleyball league, they didn't win a single match from the start of the season in October 2024. However, on March 16, 2025, in the 19th round against Queenseis Kariya, they achieved their first victory, ending their 35 losing streak.

== Honors ==
V.Challenge League 2
Championship (1): 2017-18

V.League Division 2
Champions (2): 2019-20, 2020-21
Runner-up (2): 2021-22, 2022-23

== League Result ==
League		Position	Teams	Matches	Win	Lose
V.Challenge League 2	2015-16	4th	5	16	7	9
V.Challenge League 2	2016-17	3rd	6	15	9	6
V.Challenge League 2	2017-18	Champion	6	15	13	2
V.League Division 2	2018-19	3rd	10	18	14	4
V.League Division 2	2019-20	Champion	8	21	18	3
V.League Division 2	2020-21	Champion	9	12	10	2
V.League Division 2	2021-22	Runner-up	10	17	16	1
V.League Division 2	2022-23	Runner-up	11	20	15	5
V.League Division 2	2023-24	3rd	10	18	13	5
SV.League	2024-25	14th	14	44	5	39
SV.League	2025-26	7th	14	46	25	21

== Current Squad ==
2026–27 squad as of November 2026

- Head coach: (Japan) Masayasu Sakamoto

No.	Name	Position	Date of birth	Height (m)
1	(Russia) Alina Popova	Outside Hitter	4 January 2005 (age 21)	1.86 m (6 ft 1 in)
2	(Japan) Riko Sato	Middle Blocker	22 August 2002 (age 24)	1.77 m (5 ft 10 in)
3	(Japan) Mikoto Shima	Outside Hitter	18 January 1999 (age 27)	1.75 m (5 ft 9 in)
4	(Japan) Maho Kudo	Libero	5 August 2004 (age 22)	1.67 m (5 ft 6 in)
5	(Japan) Momoko Niida	Outside Hitter	1 August 2000 (age 26)	1.77 m (5 ft 10 in)
6	(Japan) Moka Otomo	Setter	24 April 2002 (age 24)	1.73 m (5 ft 8 in)
7	(Japan) Yasuha Nakano	Outside Hitter	30 July 2002 (age 24)	1.71 m (5 ft 7 in)
8	(Japan) Minami Takaso (c)	Outside Hitter	8 August 1996 (age 30)	1.64 m (5 ft 5 in)
9	(Japan) Haruka Yamashita	Setter	14 October 1996 (age 30)	1.70 m (5 ft 7 in)
10	(Poland) Olivia Różański	Outside Hitter	5 June 1997 (age 29)	1.85 m (6 ft 1 in)
11	(Japan) Haruyo Shimamura	Middle Blocker	4 March 1992 (age 34)	1.82 m (6 ft 0 in)
12	(Japan) Yuka Hori	Outside Hitter	26 May 2003 (age 23)	1.75 m (5 ft 9 in)
13	(Japan) Arina Tsutsumi	Outside Hitter	9 September 2003 (age 23)	1.70 m (5 ft 7 in)
14	(Japan) Sunaho Yoshikawa	Middle Blocker	18 November 2004 (age 22)	1.78 m (5 ft 10 in)
15	(Serbia) Jovana Stevanovic	Middle Blocker	30 June 1992 (age 34)	1.92 m (6 ft 4 in)
16	(Vietnam) Trần Thị Thanh Thúy	Outside Hitter	12 November 1997 (age 29)	1.90 m (6 ft 3 in)
17	(Japan) Mizuki Arai	Middle Blocker	27 November 2002 (age 23)	1.76 m (5 ft 9 in)
19	(Japan) Manaka Yokoyama	Middle Blocker	11 April 2003 (age 23)	1.76 m (5 ft 9 in)
20	(Japan) Izumi Nagai	Setter	20 May 2003 (age 23)	1.70 m (5 ft 7 in)
22	(Japan) Sakura Nishikawa	Libero	14 March 2004 (age 22)	1.67 m (5 ft 6 in)
29	(Japan) Koto Monta	Libero	3 April 2002 (age 24)	1.67 m (5 ft 6 in)

== Notable Players ==
Domestic players

Japan

- Haruyo Shimamura (2026-)

Foreign players

Bulgaria

- Nasya Dimitrova (2025–2026)

Poland

- Olivia Różański (2025-)

Serbia

- Jovana Stevanovic (2026-)

Vietnam

- Trần Thị Thanh Thúy (2025-)
