= Aranmare Akita Shonai =

Japanese volleyball club

Coordinates: 38°52′21.5″N 139°50′8.3″E

- Short name: Aranmare
- Founded: 2015
- Ground: Akita Prefectural Gymnasium; Akita, Akita Prefecture, Japan (Capacity: 6,000)
- Chairman: Shinichi Tamagami
- Manager Head coach: Kei Sato (Bulgaria) Khristian Mikhailov
- Captain: Shuna Omoto
- League: SV.League
- 2026-27: 14th (SVL)
- Website: Club home page

Uniforms
Home	Away

Prestige International Aranmare Akita Shonai (プレステージ・インターナショナルアランマーレ (バレーボール), Puresutēji Intānashonaru Aranmare (Barēbōru)) is a women's volleyball team based in Katagami, Japan. It plays in SV.League. The club was founded in 2015, and the owner of the team is Shinichi Tamagami of the Prestige International. Prestige also runs basketball and handball teams in Akita and Toyama.

Aranmare is a coined word combining arancia and mare ("orange and sea" in Italian).

== History ==
- 2015 - Founded as Prestige International Aranmare Volleyball Club
- 2016-17 - Aya Sato won the scoring leader of the league.
- 2018 - Promoted to V.League Women Division 2
- 2018-19 - Aranmare placed 4th
- 2026-27 - Changed the club's name to Aranmare Akita Shonai

== League results ==
Official Record

=== V・challenge 2 ===
League	Year	Position	Teams	Regular round				PS		
League	Year	Position	Teams	Position	G	W	L	G	W	L
challenge II	2015/16	5th	5	5th	16	2	14	-		
challenge II	2016/17	4th	6	4th	15	8	7	-		
challenge II	2017/18	5th	6	5th	15	6	9	-		

=== V.LEAGUE ===
League	Year	Position	Teams	Regular round				PS		
League	Year	Position	Teams	Position	G	W	L	G	W	L
DIVISION2	2018-19	4th	10	4th	18	10	8	5	1	4
DIVISION2	2019-20	5th	8	5th	21	11	10	-		
DIVISION2	2020-21	3rd	9	3rd	14	10	4	-		

=== SV.League ===
Year	Position	Teams	Matches	Win	Lose
2024-25	13	14	44	5	39
2025-26	14	14	44	3	41

== Current squad ==
2026/27 Squad as of November 2026

- Head coach: (Bulgaria) Kristian Michailov

No.	Name	Position	Date of birth	Height (m)
1	(Japan) Shuna Ohmoto (C)	Middle Blocker	2 May 1995 (age 31)	1.75 m (5 ft 9 in)
2	(China) Qiushuang Du	Outside Hitter	16 September 2006 (age 20)	1.85 m (6 ft 1 in)
4	(Brazil) Leirelainy Andrade	Outside Hitter	6 May 2000 (age 26)	1.75 m (5 ft 9 in)
6	(Japan) Haruka Kaji	Setter	24 March 2003 (age 23)	1.73 m (5 ft 8 in)
8	(Japan) Mari Morita	Libero	18 September 1997 (age 29)	1.67 m (5 ft 6 in)
9	(Japan) Yuna Tokunaga	Outside Hitter	11 July 2003 (age 23)	1.70 m (5 ft 7 in)
10	(Japan) Natsu Kawatsuri	Middle Blocker	16 July 2001 (age 25)	1.72 m (5 ft 8 in)
11	(Japan) Maho Tanaka	Libero	4 October 2002 (age 24)	1.67 m (5 ft 6 in)
12	(Japan) Nozomi Kohiro	Outside Hitter	5 December 2003 (age 22)	1.65 m (5 ft 5 in)
15	(Japan) Haruka Sawada	Outside Hitter	7 March 2004 (age 22)	1.75 m (5 ft 9 in)
16	(Spain) María Priscilla Schlegel	Outside Hitter	29 August 1993 (age 33)	1.80 m (5 ft 11 in)
17	(Japan) Saki Matsumoto	Outside Hitter	13 February 2008 (age 18)	1.84 m (6 ft 0 in)
19	(Japan) Ogawa Mao	Opposite Hitter	9 July 2002 (age 24)	1.74 m (5 ft 9 in)
21	(Japan) Miyu Niigata	Middle Blocker	12 June 2007 (age 19)	1.77 m (5 ft 10 in)
24	(Japan) Kokoro Ozaki	Outside Hitter	18 July 2007 (age 19)	1.71 m (5 ft 7 in)
25	(Japan) Chihiro Kanda	Setter	20 November 2001 (age 24)	1.66 m (5 ft 5 in)
27	(Japan) Suzumi Arimura	Outside Hitter	17 September 1999 (age 27)	1.72 m (5 ft 8 in)
28	(Japan) Ndigwe Chisom Cindy	Middle Blocker	16 August 2005 (age 21)	1.84 m (6 ft 0 in)
29	(Thailand) Wimonrat Thanapan	Middle Blocker	2 April 2002 (age 24)	1.80 m (5 ft 11 in)
30	(Moldova) Aliona Martiniuc	Opposite Hitter	22 June 1991 (age 35)	1.86 m (6 ft 1 in)

== Former players ==
Japan

- Nozomi Asakawa
- Yuki Egawa Transfer to Ligare Sendai (ja)
- Mariko Fujiwara
- Yuri Fukuda
- Yuki Honma
- Serena Ito
- Yukiko Matsuo
- Miyu Misawa
- Kasumi Nakada
- Juri Sakurai
- Aya Sato (volleyball)
- Chisaki Sato
- Nashika Sato
- Tsubura Satō
- Mizuki Tanno
- Sayaka Toda

== Arenas and practice facilities ==
The team would use arenas in Katagami to practice.

== Gallery ==
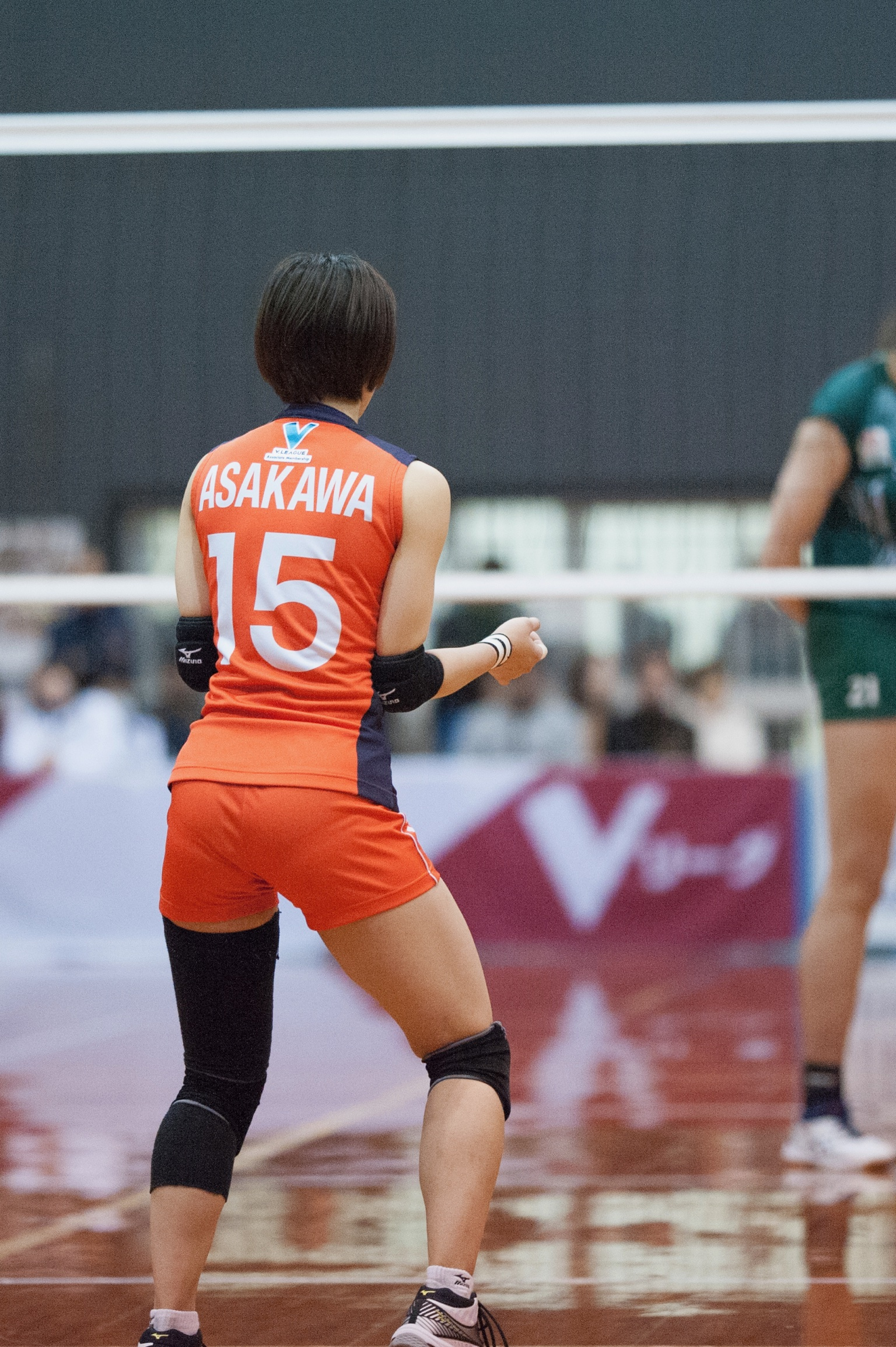
Nozomi Asakawa

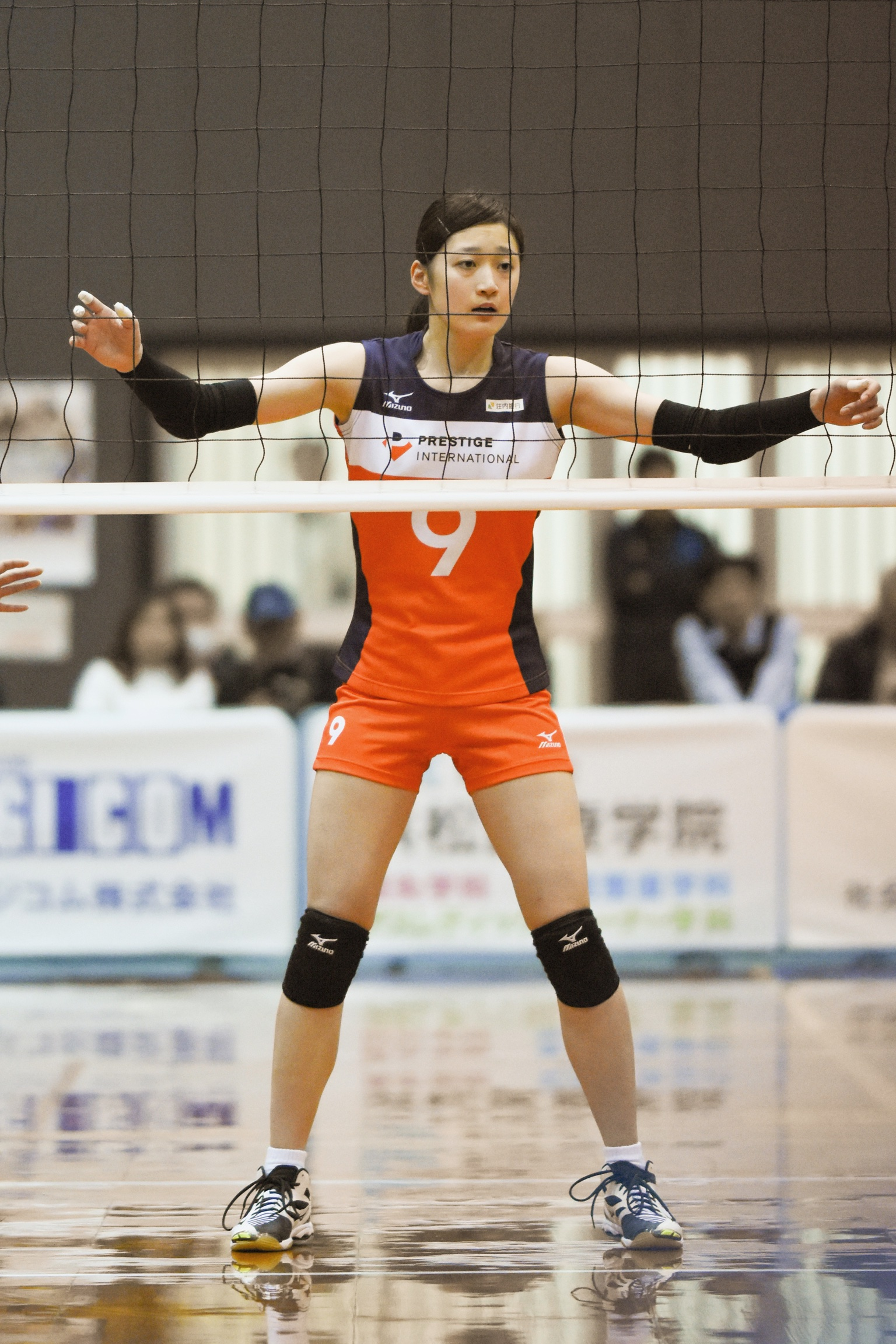
Sayaka Toda

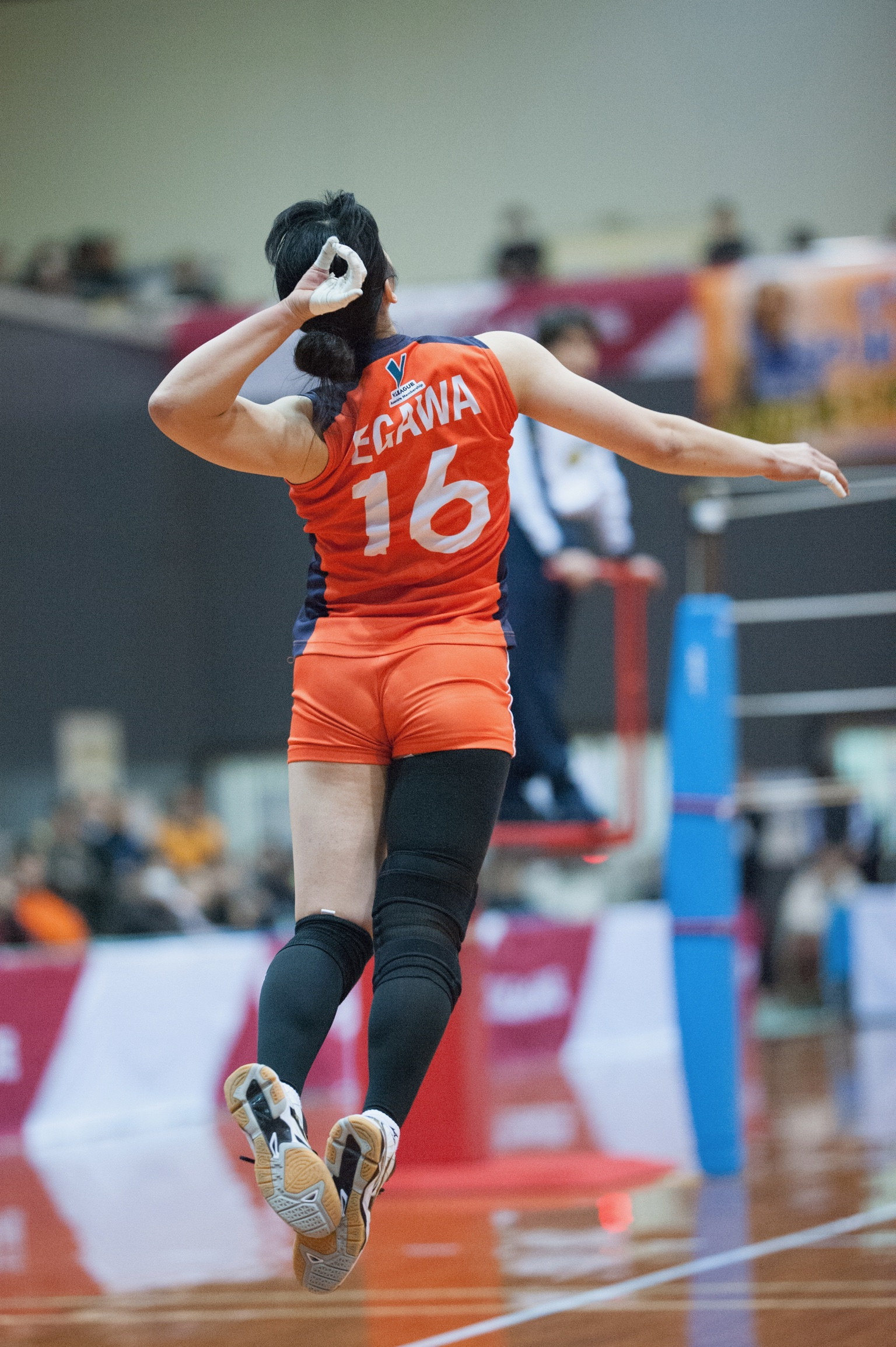
Yuki Egawa

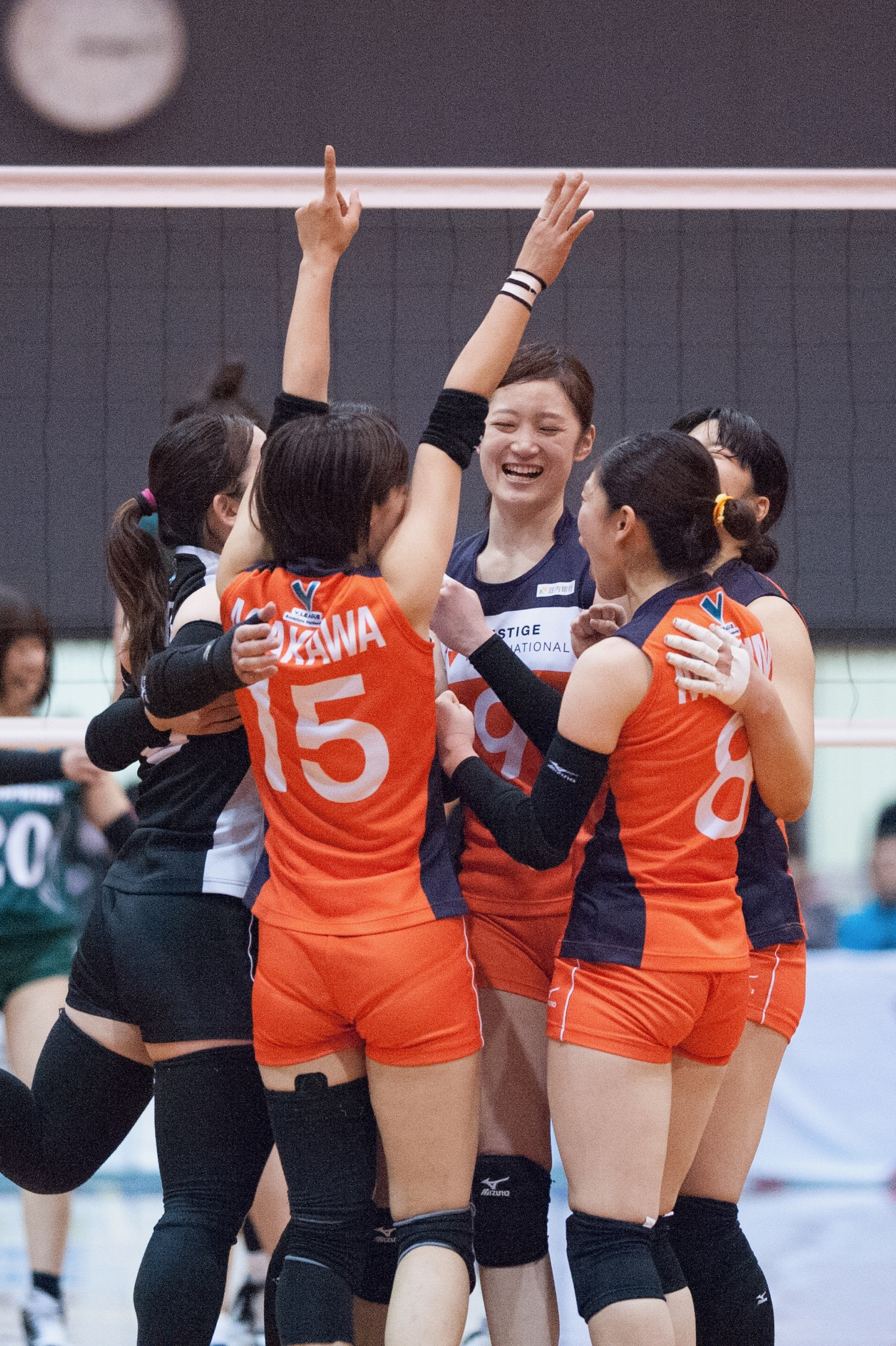

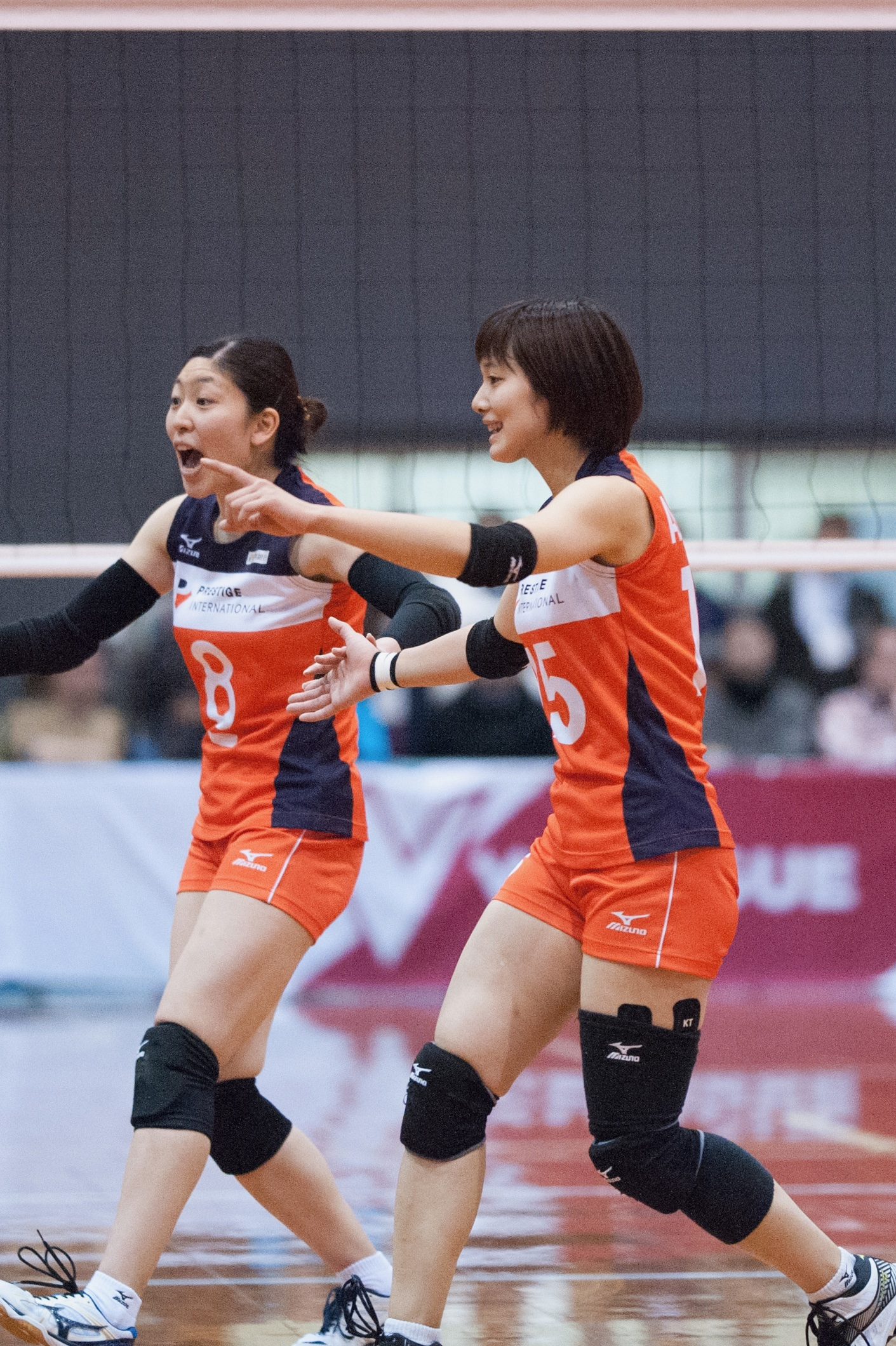
Megumi Tamura

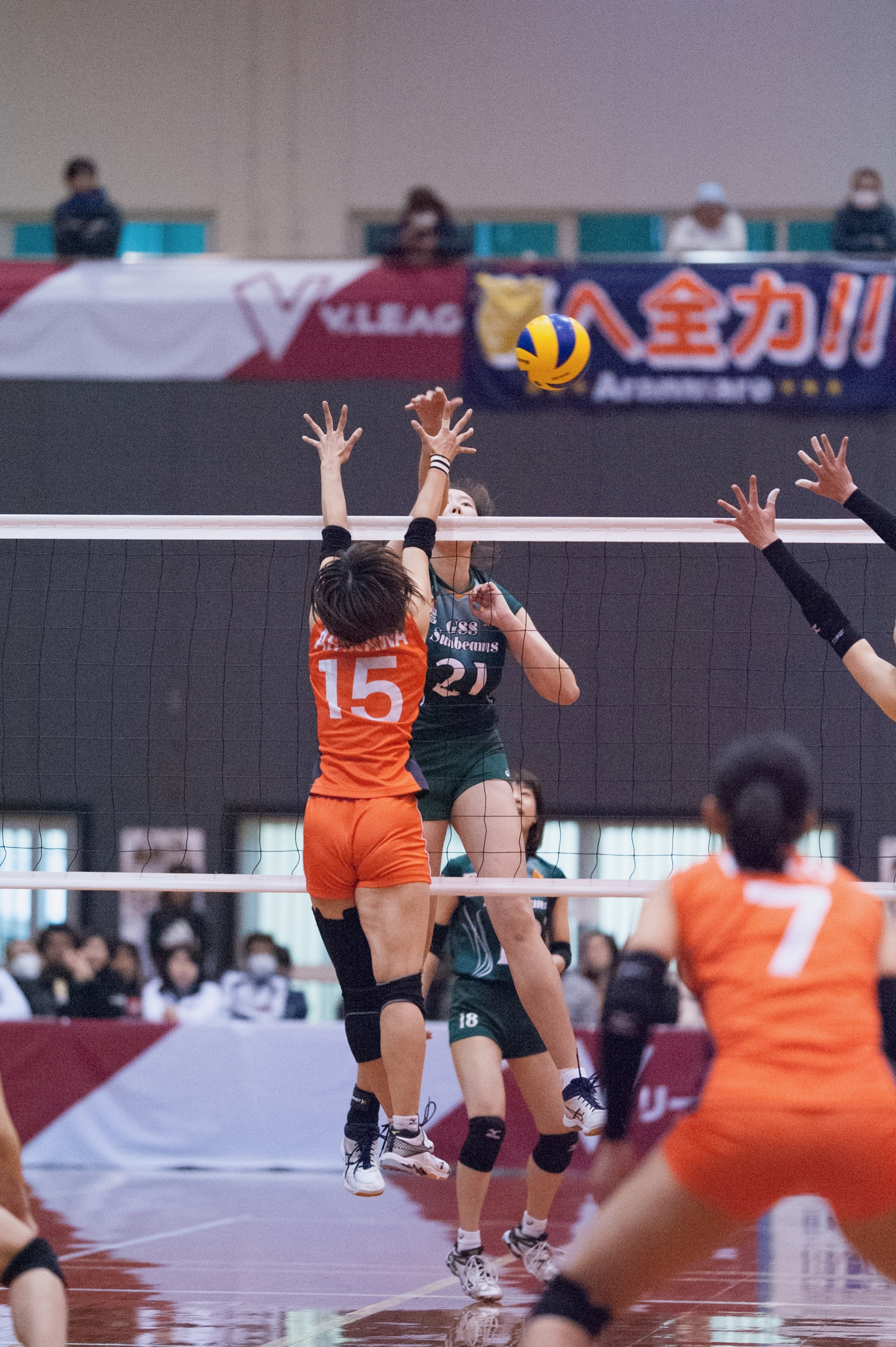
Nozomi Asakawa

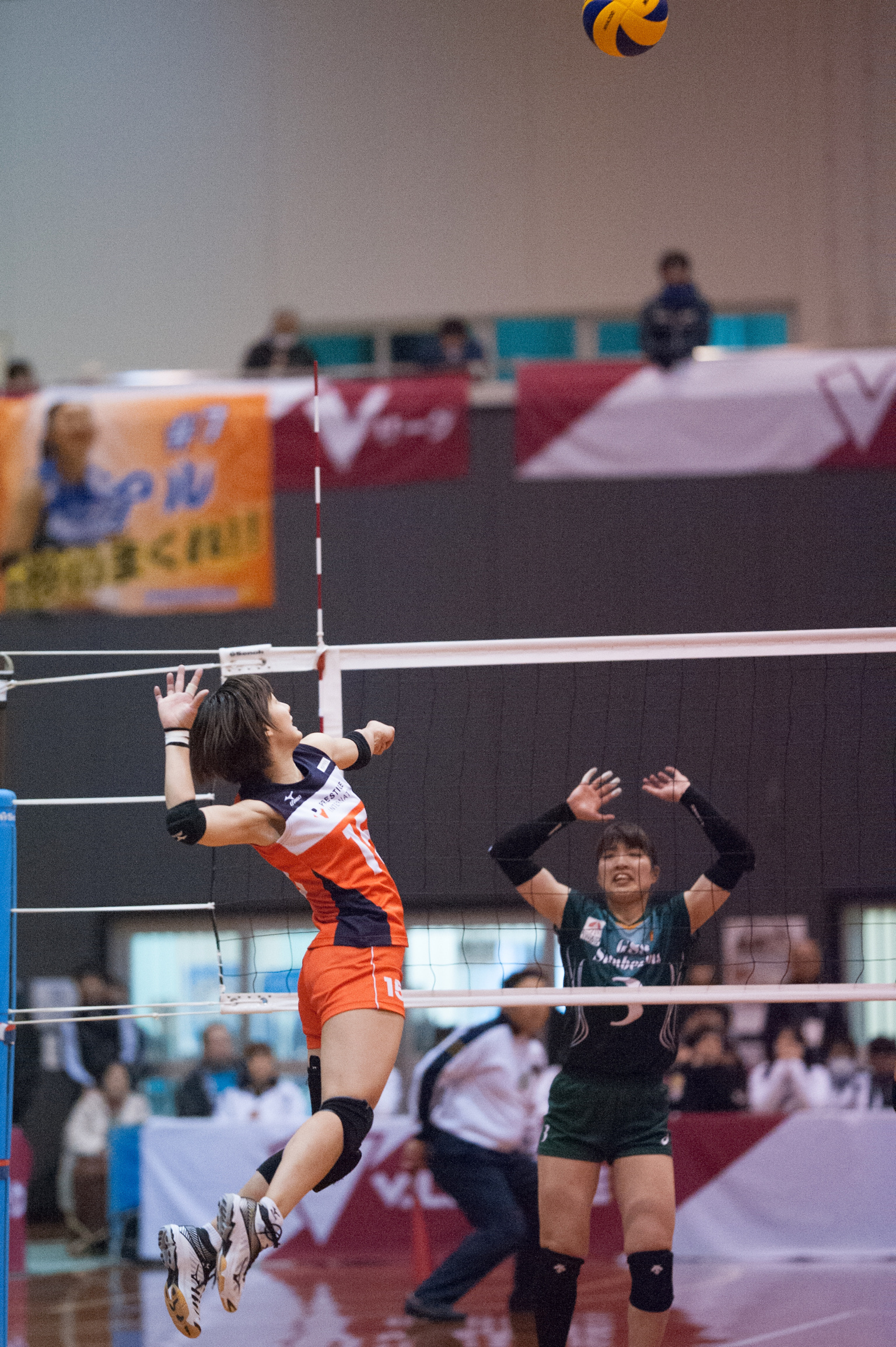
Nozomi Asakawa

== See also ==
- Prestige International Aranmare Akita
- Prestige International Aranmare Toyama
