= Wimonrat Thanapan =

Thai volleyball player

Personal information
- Full name: Wimonrat Thanapan
- Nickname: Kai
- Born: 2 August 2002 (age 24)
- Height: 182 cm (6 ft 0 in)
- Weight: 59 kg (130 lb)
- Spike: 298 cm (117 in)
- Block: 292 cm (115 in)

Volleyball information
- Position: Middle Blocker
- Current club: (Japan) Aranmare Yamagata
- Number: 29

National team
- Years: Team
- 2023–: Thailand
Honours
Women's volleyball
Representing Thailand
Asian Women's Volleyball Championship
Gold medal – first place	2023 Nakhon Ratchasima	Team
Gold medal – first place	2026 Tianjin	Team
Southeast Asian Games
Gold medal – first place	2023 Cambodia	Team
SEA V. League
Gold medal – first place	2023 Vietnam	Team
Gold medal – first place	2023 Chiang Mai	Team
Gold medal – first place	2024 Vĩnh Phúc	Team
Gold medal – first place	2025 Nakhon Ratchasima	Team
Silver medal – second place	2025 Ninh Bình	Team

Wimonrat Thanapan (Thai: วิมลรัตน์ ทะนะพันธุ์, born 2 August 2002) is a member of Thailand women's national volleyball team.

== Career ==
She made her debut at 2023 SEA Games and won gold with her team. She also competed in the 2023 Asian Women's Volleyball Championship and won the championship title.

In the 2023–2024 season of V.League (Japan), she played for Toray Arrows.

== Clubs ==
- (Thailand) Nonthaburi (2018–2022)
- (Thailand) Khonkaenstar Volleyball Club (2022–2023)
- (Japan) Toray Arrows (2023–2024)
- (Japan) Gunma Green Wings (2024–2025)
- (Japan) Aranmare Yamagata (2025-present)
