= Nasya Dimitrova =

Bulgarian volleyball player (born 1992)

Personal information
- Full name: Nasya Dimitrova
- Nationality: Bulgarian
- Born: 6 November 1992 (age 34) Yambol, Bulgaria
- Height: 1.89 m (6 ft 2 in)

Volleyball information
- Position: Middle blocker
- Current club: Gunma Green Wings

Career
- Years: Team
- 2008–2014 2014–2015 2015–2016 2016–2019 2019–2020 2020–2021 2021–2022 2022–2024 2024–2025 2025–2026: BUL Levski (Sofia); AZE Azerrail (Baku); BUL Levski (Sofia); BUL VC Maritza (Plovdiv); TUR PTT Spor (Ankara); ROM CS Dinamo București; UKR SC Prometeyi; ROM CS Dinamo București; TUR Kuzeyboru Spor Kulübü; JPN Gunma Green Wings

National team
- Years: Team
- –: Bulgaria

Nasya Dimitrova (Bulgarian Cyrillic: Нася Димитрова; born 6 November 1992) is a Bulgarian volleyball player.

She participated in the 2018 FIVB Volleyball Women's World Championship. 2019 FIVB Volleyball Women's Nations League. 2021 Women's European Volleyball League, winning a gold medal, and 2022 FIVB Volleyball Women's World Championship.

She currently plays for Bulgaria women's national team and Kuzeyboru Spor Kulübü as middle blocker.
