= 2023 Men's NORCECA Volleyball Championship squads =

National team squads for 2023 NORCECA Championship

This article shows the rosters of all participating teams at the 2023 Men's NORCECA Volleyball Championship in Charleson, West Virginia, United States.

== Canada ==
The following is the Canada squad.

Head coach: (Finland) Tuomas Sammelvuo

No.	Name	Pos.	Date of birth	Height	Spike	Block	2022–23 club
1	Pearson Eshenko	MB	16 Oct 1997	2.04 m (6 ft 8 in)	363 cm (11 ft 11 in)	340 cm (11 ft 2 in)	(Germany) SVG Lüneburg
2	Luke Herr	S	18 Jul 1994	1.92 m (6 ft 4 in)	325 cm (10 ft 8 in)	307 cm (10 ft 1 in)	(Greece) AONS Milon
4	Nicholas Hoag C	OH	19 Aug 1992	2.00 m (6 ft 7 in)	350 cm (11 ft 6 in)	323 cm (10 ft 7 in)	(Turkey) Arkas Spor
6	Danny Demyanenko	MB	13 Jul 1994	1.96 m (6 ft 5 in)	355 cm (11 ft 8 in)	325 cm (10 ft 8 in)	(France) Montpellier
7	Stephen Maar	OH	6 Dec 1994	2.01 m (6 ft 7 in)	358 cm (11 ft 9 in)	329 cm (10 ft 10 in)	(Italy) Vero Volley Monza
8	Brett Walsh	S	19 Feb 1994	1.96 m (6 ft 5 in)	347 cm (11 ft 5 in)	315 cm (10 ft 4 in)	(Greece) PAOK Thessaloniki
12	Lucas Van Berkel	MB	29 Nov 1991	2.10 m (6 ft 11 in)	350 cm (11 ft 6 in)	326 cm (10 ft 8 in)	(France) Tourcoing Lille Métropole
13	Samuel Cooper	OH	17 Jun 2001	2.00 m (6 ft 7 in)	369 cm (12 ft 1 in)	335 cm (11 ft 0 in)	(Canada) McMaster University
14	Arthur Szwarc	OP	30 Mar 1995	2.09 m (6 ft 10 in)	360 cm (11 ft 10 in)	337 cm (11 ft 1 in)	(Italy) Vero Volley Monza
16	Jordan Schnitzer	MB	28 Jul 1999	1.98 m (6 ft 6 in)	359 cm (11 ft 9 in)	331 cm (10 ft 10 in)	(Germany) SVG Lüneburg
18	Justin Lui	L	8 May 2000	1.78 m (5 ft 10 in)	304 cm (10 ft 0 in)	302 cm (9 ft 11 in)	(United States) Stanford University
20	Jordan Canham	OP	4 Jul 2000	1.95 m (6 ft 5 in)	353 cm (11 ft 7 in)	321 cm (10 ft 6 in)	(Canada) University of Alberta
80	Eric Loeppky	OH	1 Aug 1998	1.97 m (6 ft 6 in)	355 cm (11 ft 8 in)	325 cm (10 ft 8 in)	(Italy) Prisma Volley
97	Landon Currie	L	16 Oct 1999	1.74 m (5 ft 9 in)	310 cm (10 ft 2 in)	225 cm (7 ft 5 in)	(Canada) University of Alberta

== Cuba ==
The following is the Cuba squad.

Head coach: Jesús Cruz

No.	Name	Pos.	Date of birth	Height	Spike	Block	2022–23 club
2	Osniel Melgarejo C	OH	18 Dec 1997	1.95 m (6 ft 5 in)	348 cm (11 ft 5 in)	327 cm (10 ft 9 in)	(Italy) Power Volley Milano
3	Alexis Wilson Velazquez	MB	23 Oct 2003	2.08 m (6 ft 10 in)	342 cm (11 ft 3 in)	345 cm (11 ft 4 in)	(Cuba) Leones de La Habana
5	Javier Concepcion	MB	27 Dec 1997	2.00 m (6 ft 7 in)	356 cm (11 ft 8 in)	350 cm (11 ft 6 in)	(France) Stade Poitevin Poitiers
6	Christian Thondike Mejías	S	28 May 2001	1.95 m (6 ft 5 in)	340 cm (11 ft 2 in)	336 cm (11 ft 0 in)	(Romania) CS Dinamo București
7	Yonder Garcia	L	26 Feb 1993	1.83 m (6 ft 0 in)	325 cm (10 ft 8 in)	320 cm (10 ft 6 in)	(Egypt) Al Ahly
10	Miguel Gutierrez	OP	21 Feb 1997	1.97 m (6 ft 6 in)	340 cm (11 ft 2 in)	355 cm (11 ft 8 in)	(Italy) Volley Prata
11	Liván Taboada	S	4 Oct 1998	1.91 m (6 ft 3 in)	343 cm (11 ft 3 in)	327 cm (10 ft 9 in)	(Romania) Știința Explorări
12	Jesus Herrera Jaime	OP	4 Apr 1995	1.94 m (6 ft 4 in)	340 cm (11 ft 2 in)	336 cm (11 ft 0 in)	(Italy) Sir Safety Perugia
16	Jose Carlos Romero	OP	5 Jan 1999	1.98 m (6 ft 6 in)	350 cm (11 ft 6 in)	325 cm (10 ft 8 in)	(Argentina) Ciudad
17	Roamy Alonso	MB	24 Jul 1997	2.01 m (6 ft 7 in)	350 cm (11 ft 6 in)	330 cm (10 ft 10 in)	(Italy) Volley Piacenza
18	Miguel Angel Lopez	OH	25 Mar 1997	1.89 m (6 ft 2 in)	345 cm (11 ft 4 in)	320 cm (10 ft 6 in)	(Brazil) Sada Cruzeiro
22	Jose Miguel Gutierrez	OH	27 Oct 2001	1.92 m (6 ft 4 in)	329 cm (10 ft 10 in)	325 cm (10 ft 8 in)	(Italy) Top Volley Latina
23	Marlon Yant	OH	23 May 2001	2.02 m (6 ft 8 in)	345 cm (11 ft 4 in)	320 cm (10 ft 6 in)	(Italy) Volley Lube
24	Alain Gorguet	L	28 Dec 1993	1.89 m (6 ft 2 in)	345 cm (11 ft 4 in)	334 cm (10 ft 11 in)	Santiago de Cuba

== Dominican Republic ==
The following is the Dominican Republic squad.

Head coach: (Venezuela) José Gutiérrez Sánchez

No.	Name	Pos.	Date of birth	Height	Spike	Block	2022–23 club
1	Henry Tapia	OP	1 Mar 1992	1.98 m (6 ft 6 in)	355 cm (11 ft 8 in)	340 cm (11 ft 2 in)	(Turkey) Hatay BBSK
2	Luis David Renoso	OH	4 Sep 2000	1.88 m (6 ft 2 in)	330 cm (10 ft 10 in)	320 cm (10 ft 6 in)	(Dominican Republic) Voleibol Baní
4	Wifrido Hernández	OH	8 Dec 1990	2.00 m (6 ft 7 in)	360 cm (11 ft 10 in)	350 cm (11 ft 6 in)	(United Arab Emirates) Hatta Club Dubai
5	Enger Meses	L	1 Dec 1995	1.71 m (5 ft 7 in)	240 cm (7 ft 10 in)		(United States) Inland Empire Matadors
6	Adrián Figueroa Lantigua	OP	17 Sep 2003	1.95 m (6 ft 5 in)	325 cm (10 ft 8 in)	315 cm (10 ft 4 in)	(Dominican Republic) Voleibol Moca
8	Henry López	OH	9 Dec 1994	1.80 m (5 ft 11 in)	345 cm (11 ft 4 in)	335 cm (11 ft 0 in)	(Dominican Republic) Voleibol Moca
9	Bryan Turbides Pepén	L	29 Sep 2001	1.77 m (5 ft 10 in)	228 cm (7 ft 6 in)		(United States) Edward Waters College
10	Gerson Toribio	MB	14 Aug 1996	1.96 m (6 ft 5 in)	340 cm (11 ft 2 in)	330 cm (10 ft 10 in)	(Dominican Republic) Voleibol Santiago
11	Juan José De Jesús Hernández	S	1 Nov 1994	1.91 m (6 ft 3 in)	365 cm (12 ft 0 in)	353 cm (11 ft 7 in)	(Dominican Republic) Club Mauricio Baez
12	Rafael Almonte Bismal	OP	9 Apr 1999	1.83 m (6 ft 0 in)	338 cm (11 ft 1 in)	336 cm (11 ft 0 in)	(Dominican Republic) Voleibol Monte Plata
14	Francisco Argelis Arredondo	S	1 Oct 1996	1.87 m (6 ft 2 in)	333 cm (10 ft 11 in)	323 cm (10 ft 7 in)	(Dominican Republic) Voleibol Bayaguana
15	Luther Rosario Adames	MB	5 Apr 2003	2.00 m (6 ft 7 in)	335 cm (11 ft 0 in)	315 cm (10 ft 4 in)	(Dominican Republic) Guerreros Volleyball
18	Moises Ortiz	MB	3 Dec 2003	2.04 m (6 ft 8 in)	360 cm (11 ft 10 in)	350 cm (11 ft 6 in)	(Dominican Republic) Club Mauricio Baez
19	Héctor Alexis Cruz	OH	12 Jun 1997	1.87 m (6 ft 2 in)	340 cm (11 ft 2 in)	330 cm (10 ft 10 in)	(Libya) Al-Nasr SC

== Mexico ==
The following is the Mexico squad.

Head coach: Jorge Azair López

No.	Name	Pos.	Date of birth	Height	Spike	Block	2022–23 club
2	Jorge Hernández Cabrera	OH	14 Aug 2003	1.97 m (6 ft 6 in)	358 cm (11 ft 9 in)	327 cm (10 ft 9 in)	(Mexico) Baja California Voleibol
3	Hiram Bravo Moreno	L	19 Dec 1999	1.73 m (5 ft 8 in)	234 cm (7 ft 8 in)	226 cm (7 ft 5 in)	(Mexico) Mezcaleros
5	Victor Parra Valenzuela	MB	3 Sep 1999	2.02 m (6 ft 8 in)	348 cm (11 ft 5 in)	325 cm (10 ft 8 in)	(Mexico) Mezcaleros
6	Josué López Ríos	OH	21 Jul 2002	1.97 m (6 ft 6 in)	360 cm (11 ft 10 in)	330 cm (10 ft 10 in)	(Portugal) Sporting CP
8	Edgar Alejandro Mendoza Burgueño	S	8 Jan 1999	1.97 m (6 ft 6 in)	338 cm (11 ft 1 in)	326 cm (10 ft 8 in)	(Mexico) Nayarit Voleibol
10	Pedro Rangel	S	16 Sep 1988	1.92 m (6 ft 4 in)	340 cm (11 ft 2 in)	324 cm (10 ft 8 in)	(Romania) CS Arcada Galați
11	Brandon López Ríos	MB	30 Aug 1996	1.97 m (6 ft 6 in)	350 cm (11 ft 6 in)	325 cm (10 ft 8 in)	(Mexico) Mezcaleros
16	Miguel Chávez Pasos	MB	13 May 1996	2.02 m (6 ft 8 in)	335 cm (11 ft 0 in)	293 cm (9 ft 7 in)	(Mexico) Tapatíos de Jalisco
17	Jesús Izaguirre Rodriguez	L	7 Mar 1997	1.65 m (5 ft 5 in)	300 cm (9 ft 10 in)	280 cm (9 ft 2 in)	(Mexico) Mezcaleros
18	Yasutaka Sanay Heredia	OH	2 May 2001	1.86 m (6 ft 1 in)	345 cm (11 ft 4 in)	315 cm (10 ft 4 in)	(Mexico) Mezcaleros
19	Luis Hernández Baca	OP	4 Jan 2001	2.00 m (6 ft 7 in)	357 cm (11 ft 9 in)	327 cm (10 ft 9 in)	(Mexico) Vaqueros URN
23	Luis Antonio Sanchez Lopez	OH	20 Jan 1999	1.65 m (5 ft 5 in)	300 cm (9 ft 10 in)	295 cm (9 ft 8 in)	(Mexico) Chihuahua Voleibol
48	Franky Hernández Milantony	OH	4 Mar 2002	1.94 m (6 ft 4 in)	322 cm (10 ft 7 in)	318 cm (10 ft 5 in)	(Mexico) Mezcaleros

== Puerto Rico ==
The following is the Puerto Rico squad.

Head coach: Oswald Antonetti

No.	Name	Pos.	Date of birth	Height	Spike	Block	2022–23 club
2	Klistan Lawrence	OH	7 Jan 2003	1.96 m (6 ft 5 in)	297 cm (9 ft 9 in)	275 cm (9 ft 0 in)	(Italy) Power Volley Milano
3	Omar Hoyos	OH	20 Dec 2001	1.96 m (6 ft 5 in)	297 cm (9 ft 9 in)	275 cm (9 ft 0 in)	(United States) George Mason University
4	Lorenzo Rivera George	OP	3 Jul 2006	2.03 m (6 ft 8 in)	303 cm (9 ft 11 in)	285 cm (9 ft 4 in)	(Puerto Rico) National Team
5	Leemanuel Lamboy Perez	MB	20 Jan 1999	1.82 m (6 ft 0 in)	262 cm (8 ft 7 in)	255 cm (8 ft 4 in)	(Puerto Rico) National Team
6	Kevin Rodríguez	S	12 Aug 1994	1.94 m (6 ft 4 in)	328 cm (10 ft 9 in)	302 cm (9 ft 11 in)	(Puerto Rico) Mets de Guaynabo
8	Sebastián Huyke Calderon	S	14 May 2003	1.85 m (6 ft 1 in)	332 cm (10 ft 11 in)	303 cm (9 ft 11 in)	(Puerto Rico) National Team
12	Axel Meléndez Watts	OH	30 Sep 2003	2.03 m (6 ft 8 in)	304 cm (10 ft 0 in)	285 cm (9 ft 4 in)	(United States) Purdue University Fort Wayne
13	Jamal Elis Carballo	OP	15 Mar 2004	2.03 m (6 ft 8 in)	345 cm (11 ft 4 in)	315 cm (10 ft 4 in)	(Puerto Rico) National Team
18	Antonio Elias Rodríguez	MB	15 Sep 2000	1.93 m (6 ft 4 in)	256 cm (8 ft 5 in)	252 cm (8 ft 3 in)	(United States) Lewis University
20	Fernand Albaladejo Morales	L	9 Jan 2003	1.70 m (5 ft 7 in)	317 cm (10 ft 5 in)	293 cm (9 ft 7 in)	(Puerto Rico) National Team
21	Janluar Figueroa Torrens	MB	30 Mar 2006	1.96 m (6 ft 5 in)	335 cm (11 ft 0 in)	325 cm (10 ft 8 in)	(Puerto Rico) National Team
24	Diego Rosich	OH	28 Feb 2002	1.93 m (6 ft 4 in)	256 cm (8 ft 5 in)	249 cm (8 ft 2 in)	(United States) North Greenville University

== Suriname ==
The following is the Suriname squad.

Head coach: (Cuba) Carlos Orta Fellove

No.	Name	Pos.	Date of birth	Height	Spike	Block	2022–23 club
3	Anfernee Lee A Leong	MB	4 Jan 2005	2.01 m (6 ft 7 in)	319 cm (10 ft 6 in)	307 cm (10 ft 1 in)	(Suriname) SVV
4	Ethan Asimia	OH	16 Sep 2001	1.89 m (6 ft 2 in)	299 cm (9 ft 10 in)	301 cm (9 ft 11 in)	(Suriname) LIVO
6	David Pinas	MB	19 May 1994	1.94 m (6 ft 4 in)	320 cm (10 ft 6 in)	308 cm (10 ft 1 in)	(Suriname) LIVO
7	Keven Sporkslede	OH	21 Oct 1993	1.97 m (6 ft 6 in)	326 cm (10 ft 8 in)	311 cm (10 ft 2 in)	(Suriname) YELYCO
8	Anferney Schmeltz	L	19 Sep 1999	1.83 m (6 ft 0 in)	276 cm (9 ft 1 in)	270 cm (8 ft 10 in)	(Suriname) YELLOWBIRDS
9	Zefanio Breinburg	OP	26 Sep 1992	1.96 m (6 ft 5 in)	326 cm (10 ft 8 in)	308 cm (10 ft 1 in)	(Suriname) LIVO
11	Leonel Mahabali	S	9 Nov 1993	1.87 m (6 ft 2 in)	303 cm (9 ft 11 in)	293 cm (9 ft 7 in)	(Suriname) YELLOWBIRDS
12	Casey Foe-A-Man	S	10 Oct 1988	1.83 m (6 ft 0 in)	305 cm (10 ft 0 in)	296 cm (9 ft 9 in)	(Suriname) YELYCO
13	Jonovan Wingaarde	OH	17 Mar 2004	1.90 m (6 ft 3 in)	322 cm (10 ft 7 in)	310 cm (10 ft 2 in)	(Suriname) SVV
14	Quincy Kruydenhof	MB	10 Oct 2000	2.02 m (6 ft 8 in)	290 cm (9 ft 6 in)	285 cm (9 ft 4 in)	(Suriname) YELYCO
17	Jason Lesperans	L	4 Nov 2003	1.80 m (5 ft 11 in)	255 cm (8 ft 4 in)	250 cm (8 ft 2 in)	(Suriname) YELLOWBIRDS
18	Meson Anakaba	OP	13 Jul 2005	1.82 m (6 ft 0 in)	320 cm (10 ft 6 in)	318 cm (10 ft 5 in)	(Suriname) SVV

== United States ==
The following is the United States squad.

Head coach: John Speraw

No.	Name	Pos.	Date of birth	Height	Spike	Block	2022–23 club
1	Matthew Anderson	OP	18 Apr 1987	2.02 m (6 ft 8 in)	360 cm (11 ft 10 in)	332 cm (10 ft 11 in)	(Russia) Zenit Saint-Petersburg
2	Aaron Russell	OH	4 Jun 1993	2.05 m (6 ft 9 in)	356 cm (11 ft 8 in)	337 cm (11 ft 1 in)	(Japan) JT Thunders
4	Jeffrey Jendryk	MB	15 Sep 1995	2.08 m (6 ft 10 in)	353 cm (11 ft 7 in)	345 cm (11 ft 4 in)	(Poland) LKPS Lublin
6	Timothy McIntosh	L	20 Nov 1997	1.82 m (6 ft 0 in)	324 cm (10 ft 8 in)	304 cm (10 ft 0 in)	(Austria) Hypo Tirol Innsbruck
9	Torey Defalco	OH	10 Apr 1997	1.98 m (6 ft 6 in)	340 cm (11 ft 2 in)	328 cm (10 ft 9 in)	(Poland) Asseco Resovia
10	Jake Hanes	OP	3 May 1998	2.10 m (6 ft 11 in)	361 cm (11 ft 10 in)	341 cm (11 ft 2 in)	(Poland) BBTS Bielsko-Biała
11	Micah Christenson	S	8 May 1993	1.98 m (6 ft 6 in)	349 cm (11 ft 5 in)	340 cm (11 ft 2 in)	(Russia) Zenit Kazan
12	Maxwell Holt	MB	12 Mar 1987	2.05 m (6 ft 9 in)	351 cm (11 ft 6 in)	333 cm (10 ft 11 in)	(China) Beijing BAIC
14	Micah Maʻa	S	16 Apr 1997	1.92 m (6 ft 4 in)	333 cm (10 ft 11 in)	318 cm (10 ft 5 in)	(Turkey) Halkbank
17	Thomas Jaeschke	OH	4 Sep 1993	1.98 m (6 ft 6 in)	348 cm (11 ft 5 in)	330 cm (10 ft 10 in)	(China) Beijing BAIC
18	Garrett Muagututia	OH	26 Feb 1988	2.05 m (6 ft 9 in)	359 cm (11 ft 9 in)	345 cm (11 ft 4 in)	(Egypt) Al Ahly
19	Taylor Averill	MB	5 Mar 1992	2.01 m (6 ft 7 in)	370 cm (12 ft 2 in)	330 cm (10 ft 10 in)	(Poland) AZS Olsztyn
20	David Smith	MB	15 Mar 1985	2.01 m (6 ft 7 in)	348 cm (11 ft 5 in)	314 cm (10 ft 4 in)	(Poland) ZAKSA Kędzierzyn-Koźle
22	Erik Shoji	L	24 Aug 1989	1.84 m (6 ft 0 in)	330 cm (10 ft 10 in)	321 cm (10 ft 6 in)	(Poland) ZAKSA Kędzierzyn-Koźle

== See also ==
- 2023 Women's NORCECA Volleyball Championship squads
