= 2023 FIVB Volleyball Men's Olympic Qualification Tournaments squads =

This article shows all participating team squads at the 2023 FIVB Volleyball Men's Olympic Qualification Tournaments held in Brazil, Japan and China, from 30 September to 8 October 2023.

== Pool A ==
=== Brazil ===
The following is the Brazilian roster in the 2023 FIVB Volleyball Men's Olympic Qualification Tournaments.

- Head coach: Renan Dal Zotto
- 1 Bruno Rezende S
- 2 Lukas Bergmann OH
- 4 Otávio Pinto MB
- 6 Adriano Cavalcante OH
- 8 Henrique Honorato OH
- 14 Fernando Kreling S
- 15 Maique Nascimento L
- 16 Lucas Saatkamp MB
- 17 Thales Hoss L
- 18 Ricardo Lucarelli OH
- 21 Alan Souza O
- 23 Flávio Gualberto MB
- 28 Darlan Souza O
- 30 Judson Amabel MB

=== Cuba ===
The following is the Cuban roster in the 2023 FIVB Volleyball Men's Olympic Qualification Tournaments.

- Head coach: Jesús Cruz
- 1 José Masso MB
- 2 Osniel Mergarejo OH
- 5 Javier Concepción MB
- 6 Christian Thondike Mejías S
- 7 Yonder García L
- 10 Miguel Gutiérrez O
- 11 Liván Taboada S
- 12 Jesús Herrera O
- 17 Roamy Alonso MB
- 18 Miguel Ángel López OH
- 22 José Gutiérrez OH
- 23 Marlon Yant OH
- 24 Alain Gorguet L
- 33 Alexis Wilson MB

=== Czech Republic ===
The following is the Czech roster in the 2023 FIVB Volleyball Men's Olympic Qualification Tournaments.

- Head coach: Jiří Novák
- 2 Jan Hadrava O
- 3 Daniel Pfeffer L
- 5 Adam Zajíček MB
- 6 Milan Moník L
- 8 Lukáš Trojanowicz MB
- 10 Jan Svoboda OH
- 11 Lukáš Vašina OH
- 12 Martin Licek OH
- 13 Jan Galabov OH
- 16 Jiří Srb S
- 17 Marek Šotola O
- 18 Jakub Janouch S
- 20 Petr Špulák MB
- 25 Josef Polák MB

=== Germany ===
The following is the German roster in the 2023 FIVB Volleyball Men's Olympic Qualification Tournaments.

- Head coach: (Poland) Michał Winiarski
- 1 Christian Fromm OH
- 2 Johannes Tille S
- 3 Denis Kaliberda OH
- 5 Moritz Reichert OH
- 9 György Grozer O
- 10 Julian Zenger L
- 12 Anton Brehme L
- 13 Ruben Schott OH
- 14 Moritz Karlitzek OH
- 17 Jan Zimmermann S
- 18 Florian Krage MB
- 19 Erik Röhrs OH
- 21 Tobias Krick MB
- 25 Lukas Maase MB

=== Iran ===
The following is the Iranian roster in the 2023 FIVB Volleyball Men's Olympic Qualification Tournaments.

- Head coach: Alireza Tolookian
- 1 Mahdi Jelveh MB
- 6 Mohammad Mousavi MB
- 8 Mohammad Reza Hazratpour L
- 10 Amin Esmaeilnezhad O
- 11 Saber Kazemi O
- 12 Amirhossein Esfandiar OH
- 14 Javad Karimi S
- 17 Meisam Salehi OH
- 18 Mohammad Taher Vadi S
- 19 Poriya Hossein Khanzadeh OH
- 20 Shahrooz Homayonfarmanesh OH
- 21 Arman Salehi L
- 22 Mohammad Valizadeh MB
- 30 Mobin Nasri OH

=== Italy ===
The following is the Italian roster in the 2023 FIVB Volleyball Men's Olympic Qualification Tournaments.

- Head coach: Ferdinando De Giorgi
- 5 Alessandro Michieletto OH
- 6 Simone Giannelli S
- 7 Fabio Balaso L
- 8 Riccardo Sbertoli S
- 10 Leonardo Scanferla L
- 12 Mattia Bottolo OH
- 13 Lorenzo Cortesia MB
- 14 Gianluca Galassi MB
- 15 Daniele Lavia OH
- 16 Yuri Romanò O
- 20 Tommaso Rinaldi OH
- 23 Alessandro Bovolenta O
- 28 Giovanni Sanguinetti MB
- 30 Leandro Mosca MB

=== Qatar ===
The following is the Qatari roster in the 2023 FIVB Volleyball Men's Olympic Qualification Tournaments.

- Head coach: (Argentina) Camilo Soto
- 2 Papemaguette Diagne MB
- 4 Ribeiro Renan O
- 6 Borislav Georgiev S
- 7 Belal Nabel Abunabot MB
- 8 Mohamed Widatalla OH
- 9 Milos Stevanovic S
- 10 Abdulwahid Wagihalla Osman MB
- 11 Nikola Vasić OH
- 12 Mubarak Dahi O
- 13 Raimi Wadidie OH
- 17 Ahmed Noaman Gamal L
- 18 Ahmed Abdelrahim MB
- 19 Mahmoud Naji L
- 24 Abdelrahman Ayman Bakry O

=== Ukraine ===
The following is the Ukrainian roster in the 2023 FIVB Volleyball Men's Olympic Qualification Tournaments.

- Head coach: (Latvia) Uģis Krastiņš
- 1 Tymofii Poluian OH
- 3 Bohdan Mazenko MB
- 5 Oleh Plotnytskyi OH
- 7 Yurii Synytsia S
- 9 Volodymyr Ostapenko MB
- 10 Yurii Semeniuk MB
- 11 Dmytro Kanaiev L
- 12 Serhii Yevstratov S
- 13 Vasyl Tupchii O
- 14 Illia Kovalov OH
- 16 Vitalii Kucher OH
- 17 Oleksandr Boiko L
- 21 Yevhenii Kisiliuk OH
- 27 Vladyslav Shchurov MB

== Pool B ==
=== Egypt ===
The following is the Egyptian roster in the 2023 FIVB Volleyball Men's Olympic Qualification Tournaments.

- Head coach: (Italy) Flavio Gulinelli
- 3 Ashraf Ellakany S
- 6 Mohamed Hassan L
- 7 Mohamed Noureldin L
- 8 Abdelrahman Elhossiny Eissa OH
- 9 Mohamed Sayedin OH
- 10 Mohamed Masoud MB
- 11 Ahmed Afifi OH
- 12 Hossam Abdalla S
- 13 Mohamed Khater MB
- 14 Seifeldin Hassan Aly O
- 15 Abdelrahman Seoudy MB
- 17 Reda Haikal O
- 22 Mohamed Moustafa Issa OH
- 23 Ahmed Omar OH

=== Finland ===
The following is the Finnish roster in the 2023 FIVB Volleyball Men's Olympic Qualification Tournaments.

- Head coach: (United Kingdom) Joel Banks
- 2 Eemi Tervaportti S
- 3 Jiri Hänninen OH
- 5 Alexej Zhbankov MB
- 7 Niko Suihkonen OH
- 8 Voitto Köykkä L
- 10 Luka Marttila OH
- 11 Miika Haapaniemi MB
- 12 Aaro Nikula O
- 13 Joonas Jokela O
- 14 Nuutti Niinivaara MB
- 19 Niklas Breilin L
- 20 Henrik Porkka MB
- 21 Fedor Ivanov S
- 23 Antti Sakari Mäkinen OH

=== Japan ===
The following is the Japanese roster in the 2023 FIVB Volleyball Men's Olympic Qualification Tournaments.

- Head coach: (France) Philippe Blain
- 1 Yuji Nishida O
- 2 Taishi Onodera MB
- 4 Kento Miyaura O
- 5 Tatsunori Otsuka OH
- 6 Akihiro Yamauchi MB
- 8 Masahiro Sekita S
- 10 Kentaro Takahashi MB
- 11 Shoma Tomita OH
- 12 Ran Takahashi OH
- 13 Tomohiro Ogawa L
- 14 Yūki Ishikawa OH
- 20 Tomohiro Yamamoto L
- 29 Ryu Yamamoto S
- 30 Masato Kai OH

=== Serbia ===
The following is the Serbian roster in the 2023 FIVB Volleyball Men's Olympic Qualification Tournaments.

- Head coach: (Montenegro) Igor Kolaković
- 2 Uroš Kovačević OH
- 3 Milorad Kapur L
- 7 Petar Krsmanović MB
- 8 Marko Ivović OH
- 10 Miran Kujundžić OH
- 11 Aleksa Batak S
- 12 Pavle Perić OH
- 14 Aleksandar Atanasijević O
- 15 Nemanja Mašulović MB
- 16 Dražen Luburić O
- 17 Miloš Krsteski L
- 18 Marko Podraščanin MB
- 21 Vuk Todorović S
- 29 Aleksandar Nedeljković MB

=== Slovenia ===
The following is the Slovenian roster in the 2023 FIVB Volleyball Men's Olympic Qualification Tournaments.

- Head coach: (Romania) Gheorghe Crețu
- 2 Alen Pajenk MB
- 3 Uroš Planinšič S
- 4 Jan Kozamernik MB
- 6 Urban Toman L
- 8 Rok Bračko OH
- 9 Dejan Vinčić S
- 10 Sašo Štalekar MB
- 11 Danijel Koncilja MB
- 13 Jani Kovačič L
- 14 Žiga Štern OH
- 17 Tine Urnaut OH
- 18 Klemen Čebulj OH
- 19 Rok Možič OH
- 20 Nik Mujanović O

=== Tunisia ===
The following is the Tunisian roster in the 2023 FIVB Volleyball Men's Olympic Qualification Tournaments.

- Head coach: (Italy) Antonio Giacobbe
- 2 Ahmed Kadhi MB
- 3 Khaled Ben Slimene S
- 4 Taieb Korbosli L
- 6 Mohamed Ali Ben Othmen Miladi OH
- 7 Elyes Karamosli OH
- 8 Oussama Ben Romdhane OH
- 9 Omar Agrebi MB
- 10 Hamza Nagga O
- 12 Marouane M'rabet S
- 13 Selim Mbareki MB
- 14 Mahdi Ben Tahar MB
- 15 MohamedBen Youssef Lasgher O
- 19 Aymen Bouguerra OH
- 20 Saddem Hmissi L

=== Turkey ===
The following is the Turkish roster in the 2023 FIVB Volleyball Men's Olympic Qualification Tournaments.

- Head coach: (Italy) Alberto Giuliani
- 1 Kaan Gürbüz O
- 6 Arda Bostan S
- 7 Bedirhan Bülbül MB
- 9 Mirza Lagumdzija O
- 10 Arslan Ekşi S
- 11 Yiğit Gülmezoğlu OH
- 12 Adis Lagumdzija O
- 14 Faik Samed Güneş MB
- 15 Mert Matić MB
- 18 Yasin Aydın OH
- 19 Berkay Bayraktar L
- 21 Yunus Emre Tayaz MB
- 28 Enes Atlı OH
- 53 Volkan Döne L

=== United States ===
The following is the American roster in the 2023 FIVB Volleyball Men's Olympic Qualification Tournaments.

- Head coach: John Speraw
- 1 Matt Anderson O
- 2 Aaron Russell OH
- 4 Jeffrey Jendryk MB
- 5 Kyle Ensing O
- 8 Torey DeFalco OH
- 10 Kyle Dagostino L
- 11 Micah Christenson S
- 12 Maxwell Holt MB
- 14 Micah Maʻa S
- 17 Thomas Jaeschke OH
- 18 Garrett Muagututia OH
- 19 Taylor Averill MB
- 20 David Smith MB
- 22 Erik Shoji L

== Pool C ==
=== Argentina ===
The following is the Argentine roster in the 2023 FIVB Volleyball Men's Olympic Qualification Tournaments.

- Head coach: Marcelo Méndez
- 1 Matías Sánchez S
- 3 Jan Martínez Franchi U
- 4 Joaquin Gallego MB
- 7 Facundo Conte OH
- 8 Agustín Loser MB
- 9 Santiago Danani L
- 11 Manuel Armoa OH
- 12 Bruno Lima O
- 15 Luciano De Cecco S
- 16 Pablo Koukartsev OH
- 17 Luciano Vicentín OH
- 18 Martín Ramos MB
- 21 Luciano Palonsky OH
- 22 Nicolás Zerba MB

=== Belgium ===
The following is the Belgian roster in the 2023 FIVB Volleyball Men's Olympic Qualification Tournaments.

- Head coach: (Italy) Emanuele Zanini
- 1 Jolan Cox O
- 3 Sam Deroo OH
- 4 Stijn D'Hulst S
- 5 Pieter Coolman MB
- 9 Wout D'Heer MB
- 10 Mathijs Desmet OH
- 11 Seppe van Hoyweghen S
- 12 Seppe Rotty OH
- 13 Elias Thys MB
- 20 Robbe Van De Velde OH
- 23 Ferre Reggers O
- 26 Martin Perin L
- 33 Michiel Fransen OH
- 34 Kobe Verwimp L

=== Bulgaria ===
The following is the Bulgarian roster in the 2023 FIVB Volleyball Men's Olympic Qualification Tournaments.

- Head coach: Plamen Konstantinov
- 2 Stefan Chavdarov MB
- 3 Nikolay Kolev MB
- 4 Martin Atanasov OH
- 8 Asparuh Asparuhov OH
- 9 Georgi Seganov S
- 11 Aleks Grozdanov MB
- 14 Martin Bozhilov L
- 17 Nikolay Penchev OH
- 19 Tsvetan Sokolov O
- 21 Simeon Dobrev L
- 22 Simeon Nikolov S
- 23 Aleksandar Nikolov OH
- 24 Iliya Petko MB

=== Canada ===
The following is the Canada roster in the 2023 FIVB Volleyball Men's Olympic Qualification Tournaments.

- Head coach: (Finland) Tuomas Sammelvuo
- 1 Pearson Eshenko MB
- 2 Luke Herr S
- 4 Nicholas Hoag OH
- 5 Brodie Hofer OH
- 6 Danny Demyanenko MB
- 7 Stephen Maar OH
- 8 Brett Walsh S
- 12 Lucas Van Berkel MB
- 14 Arthur Szwarc O
- 16 Jordan Schnitzer MB
- 18 Justin Lui L
- 20 Jordan Canham O
- 80 Eric Loeppky OH
- 97 Landon Currie L

=== China ===
The following is the Chinese roster in the 2023 FIVB Volleyball Men's Olympic Qualification Tournaments.

- Head coach: Wu Sheng
- 1 Wang Dongchen MB
- 2 Jiang Chuan O
- 3 Wang Hebin S
- 4 Yang Yiming L
- 6 Yu Yuantai OH
- 7 Yu Yaochen S
- 9 Li Yongzhen MB
- 15 Peng Shikun MB
- 16 Qu Zongshuai L
- 19 Zhang Guanhua O
- 21 Miao Ruantong MB
- 22 Zhang Jingyin OH
- 23 Wang Bin OH
- 29 Dai Qingyao OH

=== Mexico ===
The following is the Mexican roster in the 2023 FIVB Volleyball Men's Olympic Qualification Tournaments.

- Head coach: Jorge Azair
- 2 Jorge Hernández Cabrera OH
- 3 Hiram Bravo Moreno L
- 5 Víctor Parra Valenzuela MB
- 6 Josué López Ríos OH
- 7 Diego González Castañeda O
- 8 Edgar Mendoza Burgueño S
- 9 Axel Téllez Rodríguez MB
- 11 Brandon López Ríos MB
- 12 Mauro Fuentes Rascón OH
- 16 Miguel Chávez Pasos MB
- 17 Jesús Izaguirre Rodríguez L
- 19 Luis Hernández Baca O
- 48 Franky Hernández Milantony OH
- 96 Miguel García Reséndiz S

=== Netherlands ===
The following is the Dutch roster in the 2023 FIVB Volleyball Men's Olympic Qualification Tournaments.

- Head coach: (Italy) Roberto Piazza
- 2 Wessel Keemink S
- 3 Maarten van Garderen OH
- 4 Thijs ter Horst OH
- 5 Luuc van der Ent MB
- 6 Sil Meijs S
- 7 Gijs Jorna OH
- 8 Fabian Plak MB
- 11 Jeffrey Klok L
- 12 Bennie Tuinstra OH
- 14 Nimir Abdel-Aziz O
- 16 Wouter ter Maat O
- 17 Michaël Parkinson MB
- 18 Robbert Andringa L
- 22 Twan Wiltenburg MB

=== Poland ===
The following is the Polish roster in the 2023 FIVB Volleyball Men's Olympic Qualification Tournaments.

- Head coach: (Serbia) Nikola Grbić
- 3 Jakub Popiwczak L
- 5 Łukasz Kaczmarek O
- 7 Karol Kłos MB
- 9 Wilfredo León OH
- 10 Bartosz Bednorz OH
- 11 Aleksander Śliwka OH
- 12 Grzegorz Łomacz S
- 15 Jakub Kochanowski MB
- 16 Kamil Semeniuk OH
- 17 Paweł Zatorski L
- 19 Marcin Janusz S
- 21 Tomasz Fornal OH
- 30 Bartłomiej Bołądź O
- 99 Norbert Huber MB

== See also ==
- 2023 FIVB Volleyball Women's Olympic Qualification Tournaments squads
