= 2023 FIVB Volleyball Women's Olympic Qualification Tournaments squads =

This article shows all participating team squads at the 2023 FIVB Volleyball Women's Olympic Qualification Tournaments held in China, Japan and Poland, from 16 September to 24 September 2023.

== Pool A ==
=== Canada ===
The following is the Canada roster in the 2023 FIVB Volleyball Women's Olympic Qualification Tournaments.

- Head coach: (Canada) Shannon Winzer
- 3 Kiera Van Ryk OH
- 4 Vicky Savard OH
- 5 Julia Murmann L
- 6 Jazmine White MB
- 8 Alicia Ogoms MB
- 9 Alexa Gray OH
- 11 Andrea Mitrovic OH
- 13 Brie King S
- 14 Hilary Howe OH
- 15 Shainah Joseph O
- 17 Kacey Jost L
- 19 Emily Maglio MB
- 21 Avery Heppell MB
- 26 Quinn Pelland S

=== China ===
The following is the Chinese roster in the 2023 FIVB Volleyball Women's Olympic Qualification Tournaments.

- Head coach: (China) Cai Bin
- 1 Yuan Xinyue MB
- 3 Diao Linyu S
- 4 Yang Hanyu MB
- 5 Gao Yi MB
- 6 Gong Xiangyu O
- 7 Wang Yuanyuan MB
- 10 Wang Yunlu OH
- 11 Zhong Hui OH
- 12 Li Yingying OH
- 14 Zheng Yixin O
- 16 Ding Xia S
- 17 Ni Feifan L
- 18 Wang Mengjie L
- 21 Wu Mengjie OH

=== Czech Republic ===
The following is the Czech roster in the 2023 FIVB Volleyball Women's Olympic Qualification Tournaments.

- Head coach: (Greece) Ioannis Athanasopoulos
- 2 Eva Hodanová O
- 4 Silvie Pavlová MB
- 7 Magdalena Bukovksa OS
- 8 Ela Koulisiani MB
- 9 Daniela Digrinová L
- 10 Kateřina Valková S
- 11 Veronika Dostálová L
- 12 Ema Kneiflová MB
- 14 Lucie Kolářová OS
- 16 Michaela Mlejnková OS
- 19 Kateřina Pelikánová S
- 22 Gabriela Orvošová OP
- 25 Monika Brancuská MB
- 61 Helena Havelková OS

=== Dominican Republic ===
The following is the Dominican Republic roster in the 2023 FIVB Volleyball Women's Olympic Qualification Tournaments.

- Head coach: (Brazil) Marcos Kwiek
- 1 Cándida Arias MB
- 3 Lisvel Elisa Eve MB
- 4 Vielka Peralta OH
- 5 Brenda Castillo L
- 6 Ariana Rodríguez Fung S
- 7 Niverka Marte S
- 11 Geraldine González MB
- 15 Madeline Guillén OH
- 16 Yonkaira Peña OH
- 18 Bethania de la Cruz OH
- 20 Brayelin Martínez O
- 21 Jineiry Martínez MB
- 23 Gaila González O
- 25 Larysmer Martínez L

=== Mexico ===
The following is the Mexican roster in the 2023 FIVB Volleyball Women's Olympic Qualification Tournaments.

- Head coach: (Italy) Nicola Negro
- 1 Ivone Martinez S
- 3 Cassandra Soto OH
- 4 María Fernanda Rodríguez OH
- 6 Grecia Castro OH
- 9 María Celeste Vela S
- 11 Jocelyn Urías MB
- 12 Joseline Landeros L
- 15 Karen Rivera O
- 16 Angela Muñoz OH
- 20 Aime Topete OH
- 25 Karina Flores MB
- 30 Arleth Marquez MB

=== Netherlands ===
The following is the Dutch roster in the 2023 FIVB Volleyball Women's Olympic Qualification Tournaments.

- Head coach: (Germany) Felix Koslowski
- 1 Kirsten Knip L
- 4 Celeste Plak OP
- 5 Jolien Knollema OS
- 7 Juliet Lohuis MB
- 10 Sarah van Aalen S
- 12 Britt Bongaerts S
- 14 Laura Dijkema S
- 16 Indy Baijens MB
- 18 Marrit Jasper OS
- 19 Nika Daalderop OS
- 23 Eline Timmerman MB
- 25 Florien Reesink L
- 26 Elles Dambrink OP
- 33 Nova Marring OS

=== Serbia ===
The following is the Serbian roster in the 2023 FIVB Volleyball Women's Olympic Qualification Tournaments.

- Head coach: (Italy) Giovanni Guidetti
- 1 Bianka Buša OS
- 2 Katarina Lazović OS
- 5 Mina Popović MB
- 7 Ana Jakšić S
- 8 Slađana Mirković S
- 9 Aleksandra Uzelac OS
- 10 Maja Ognjenović S
- 12 Teodora Pušić L
- 13 Ana Bjelica OP
- 14 Maja Aleksić MB
- 15 Jovana Stevanović MB
- 16 Aleksandra Jegdić L
- 18 Tijana Bošković OP
- 22 Sara Lozo OS

=== Ukraine ===
The following is the Ukrainian roster in the 2023 FIVB Volleyball Women's Olympic Qualification Tournaments.

- Head coach: (Bulgaria) Ivan Petkov
- 1 Oleksandra Milenko OS
- 2 Diana Meliushkyna MB
- 4 Alika Lutsenko L
- 5 Krystyna Niemtseva L
- 7 Svitlana Dorsman MB
- 9 Viktoriia Oliinyk S
- 14 Daria Sharhorodska S
- 16 Anastasiia Maievska MB
- 17 Yevheniia Khober OS
- 19 Viktoriia Danchak OP
- 23 Yuliia Dymar OS
- 24 Anastasiia Kraiduba OP
- 26 Ulyana Kotar MB
- 29 Nadiia Kodola OS

== Pool B ==
=== Argentina ===
The following is the Argentine roster in the 2023 FIVB Volleyball Women's Olympic Qualification Tournaments.

- Head coach: Daniel Castellani
- 1 Tatiana Vera S
- 3 Yamila Nizetich OH
- 4 Eugenia Nosach O
- 5 Candela Sol Salinas OH
- 7 Erika Mercado O
- 9 Bianca Cugno O
- 10 Daniela Simian Bulaich OH
- 12 Tatiana Rizzo L
- 13 Bianca Farriol MB
- 14 Victoria Mayer S
- 15 Antonela Fortuna OH
- 17 Candelaria Herrera MB
- 19 Brenda Graff MB
- 20 Agostina Pelozo L

=== Belgium ===
The following is the Belgian roster in the 2023 FIVB Volleyball Women's Olympic Qualification Tournaments.

- Head coach: Kris Vansnick
- 2 Elise Van Sas S
- 4 Nathalie Lemmens MB
- 7 Celine Van Gestel OH
- 9 Nel Demeyer L
- 10 Pauline Martin O
- 12 Charlotte Krenicky S
- 13 Marlies Janssens MB
- 15 Jutta Van de Vyver S
- 17 Kaat Cos OH
- 18 Britt Rampelberg L
- 19 Silke Van Avermaet MB
- 21 Manon Stragier OH
- 22 Anna Koulberg MB
- 23 Noor Debouck OH

=== Brazil ===
The following is the Brazilian roster in the 2023 FIVB Volleyball Women's Olympic Qualification Tournaments.

- Head coach: José Roberto Guimaraes
- 2 Diana Duarte MB
- 3 Nyeme Costa L
- 5 Priscila Daroit OH
- 6 Thaísa Menezes MB
- 7 Rosamaria Montibeller OH
- 9 Roberta Ratzke S
- 10 Gabriela Guimarães OH
- 11 Maiara Basso MB
- 14 Natália Araujo L
- 15 Ana Carolina da Silva MB
- 16 Kisy Nascimento O
- 17 Júlia Bergmann OH
- 19 Tainara Santos OH
- 21 Naiane Rios S

=== Bulgaria ===
The following is the Bulgarian roster in the 2023 FIVB Volleyball Women's Olympic Qualification Tournaments.

- Head coach: (Italy) Lorenzo Micelli
- 5 Maria Yordanova OH
- 6 Miroslava Paskova OH
- 8 Petya Barakova S
- 9 Elena Becheva OH
- 11 Mariya Krivoshiyska MB
- 13 Mila Pashkuleva L
- 14 Borislava Saykova MB
- 17 Radostina Marinova OH
- 21 Mikaela Stoyanova OH
- 22 Viktoria Koeva OH
- 24 Margarita Guncheva S
- 26 Yoana Dokova L
- 27 Iva Dudova O
- 30 Boryana Angelova MB

=== Japan ===
The following is the Japanese roster in the 2023 FIVB Volleyball Women's Olympic Qualification Tournaments.

- Head coach: Masayoshi Manabe
- 2 Kotona Hayashi OH
- 3 Sarina Koga OH
- 4 Mayu Ishikawa OH
- 6 Nanami Seki S
- 9 Aya Watanabe MB
- 10 Arisa Inoue OH
- 11 Nichika Yamada MB
- 12 Satomi Fukudome L
- 17 Mizuki Tanaka OH
- 21 Tamaki Matsui S
- 23 Airi Miyabe MB
- 24 Mai Irisawa MB
- 29 Minami Nishimura L
- 37 Yukiko Wada OH

=== Peru ===
The following is the Peruvian roster in the 2023 FIVB Volleyball Women's Olympic Qualification Tournaments.

- Head coach: (Spain) Francisco Hervás
- 2 Diana De la Peña MB
- 3 María Paula Rodríguez O
- 4 Maricarmen Guerrero MB
- 6 Aixa Vigil OH
- 7 Shanaiya Ayme O
- 10 Mirian Patiño L
- 12 Daniela Muñoz OH
- 13 Maria Rojas S
- 14 Flavia Montes MB
- 15 Karla Ortiz OH
- 17 Nayeli Yabar OH
- 18 Ysabella Sánchez OH
- 19 Shiamara Almeida S
- 21 Esmeralda Sanchez L

=== Puerto Rico ===
The following is the Puerto Rican roster in the 2023 FIVB Volleyball Women's Olympic Qualification Tournaments.

- Head coach: Fernando Morales
- 1 Andrea Fuentes S
- 2 Shara Venegas L
- 3 Elaine Vazquez O
- 5 Wilmarie Rivera S
- 8 Paola Rojas MB
- 11 Brittany Abercrombie O
- 12 Neira Ortiz MB
- 16 Paola Santiago OH
- 17 Solimar Cestero O
- 18 Alba Hernández MB
- 20 Paula Cerame OH
- 21 Pilar Marie Victoria OH
- 23 Nomaris Vélez L

=== Turkey ===
The following is the Turkish roster in the 2023 FIVB Volleyball Women's Olympic Qualification Tournaments.

- Head coach: (Italy) Daniele Santarelli
- 1 Gizem Örge L
- 2 Simge Şebnem Aköz L
- 3 Cansu Özbay S
- 4 Melissa Vargas O
- 5 Ayça Aykaç L
- 6 Kübra Akman MB
- 7 Hande Baladın OH
- 11 Derya Cebecioğlu OH
- 12 Elif Şahin S
- 14 Eda Erdem Dündar MB
- 18 Zehra Güneş MB
- 19 Aslı Kalaç MB
- 22 İlkin Aydın OH
- 99 Ebrar Karakurt O

== Pool C ==
=== Colombia ===
The following is the Colombian roster in the 2023 FIVB Volleyball Women's Olympic Qualification Tournaments.

- Head coach: (Brazil) Antônio Rizola Neto
- 3 Dayana Segovia O
- 4 Laura Grajales Pascua OH
- 5 Ana Karina Olaya OH
- 8 Laura Zapata OH
- 9 Maira Ospino MB
- 10 Juliana Toro L
- 12 Sofía Cuartas O
- 13 Camila Gómez L
- 15 María Marín S
- 20 Amanda Coneo OH
- 21 Doris Manco S
- 23 Yeny Montoya Murillo OH
- 26 Sheilla Lucumi MB
- 27 Katherin Ramírez OH

=== Germany ===
The following is the German roster in the 2023 FIVB Volleyball Women's Olympic Qualification Tournaments.

- Head coach: (Belgium) Vital Heynen
- 2 Pia Kästner S
- 3 Annie Cesar L
- 4 Anna Pogany L
- 6 Antonia Stautz OH
- 9 Lina Alsmeier OH
- 10 Lena Stigrot OH
- 14 Marie Schölzel MB
- 16 Anastasia Cekulaev MB
- 17 Laura Weihenmaier OH
- 20 Kimberly Drewniok O
- 21 Camilla Weitzel MB
- 22 Monique Strubbe MB
- 23 Sarah Straube S
- 25 Rica Maase OP

=== Italy ===
The following is the Italian roster in the 2023 FIVB Volleyball Women's Olympic Qualification Tournaments.

- Head coach: Davide Mazzanti
- 1 Marina Lubian MB
- 2 Alice Degradi OH
- 3 Francesca Villani OH
- 4 Francesca Bosio S
- 7 Eleonora Fersino L
- 11 Anna Danesi MB
- 14 Elena Pietrini OH
- 15 Sylvia Nwakalor O
- 17 Miriam Sylla OH
- 19 Federica Squarcini MB
- 20 Beatrice Parrocchiale L
- 23 Giulia Gennari S
- 24 Ekaterina Antropova O
- 34 Linda Nwakalor MB

=== Poland ===
The following is the Polish roster in the 2023 FIVB Volleyball Women's Olympic Qualification Tournaments.

- Head coach: (Italy) Stefano Lavarini
- 1 Maria Stenzel L
- 5 Agnieszka Kąkolewska MB
- 6 Kamila Ganszczyk MB
- 7 Monika Gałkowska O
- 9 Magdalena Stysiak O
- 10 Monika Fedusio OH
- 11 Martyna Łukasik OH
- 12 Aleksandra Szczygłowska OH
- 14 Joanna Wołosz S
- 15 Martyna Czyrniańska OH
- 26 Katarzyna Wenerska S
- 27 Joanna Pacak MB
- 30 Olivia Różański OH
- 95 Magdalena Jurczyk MB

=== Slovenia ===
The following is the Slovenian roster in the 2023 FIVB Volleyball Women's Olympic Qualification Tournaments.

- Head coach: (Italy) Marco Bonitta
- 1 Iza Mlakar O
- 3 Eva Pogačar S
- 4 Maša Pucelj OH
- 5 Lorena Lorber Fijok OH
- 8 Eva Zatković O
- 9 Mija Šiftar OH
- 10 Sara Najdič S
- 11 Mirta Velikonja Grbac MB
- 13 Nika Milošič MB
- 15 Anja Mazej L
- 18 Saša Planinšec MB
- 19 Naja Kukman MB
- 20 Katja Banko L
- 27 Isa Ramić OH

=== South Korea ===
The following is the South Korean roster in the 2023 FIVB Volleyball Women's Olympic Qualification Tournaments.

- Head coach: (Spain) Cesar Hernández González
- 2 Juah Lee MB
- 5 Kim Dain S
- 6 Park Eun-jin MB
- 7 Kim Ji-won S
- 8 Kim Yeong-yeon L
- 12 Moon Jung-won L
- 13 Park Jeong-ah OH
- 14 Lee Da-hyeon MB
- 15 Lee Seon-woo O
- 17 Jung Ho-young MB
- 19 Pyo Seung-ju OH
- 23 Kwon Min-ji OH
- 28 Lee Han-bi OH
- 97 Kang So-hwi OH

=== Thailand ===
The following is the Thai roster in the 2023 FIVB Volleyball Women's Olympic Qualification Tournaments.

- Head coach: Danai Sriwatcharamethakul
- 1 Wipawee Srithong OH
- 2 Piyanut Pannoy L
- 3 Pornpun Guedpard S
- 5 Thatdao Nuekjang MB
- 12 Hattaya Bamrungsuk MB
- 13 Nootsara Tomkom S
- 16 Pimpichaya Kokram O
- 17 Sasipapron Janthawisut OH
- 18 Ajcharaporn Kongyot OH
- 19 Chatchu-on Moksri OH
- 21 Thanacha Sooksod O
- 29 Wimonrat Thanapan MB
- 30 Jidapa Nahuanong L
- 99 Jarasporn Bundasak MB

=== United States ===
The following is the American roster in the 2023 FIVB Volleyball Women's Olympic Qualification Tournaments.

- Head coach: Karch Kiraly
- 4 Justine Wong-Orantes L
- 5 Alexandra Frantti OH
- 6 Morgan Hentz L
- 7 Lauren Carlini S
- 10 Jordan Larson OH
- 11 Andrea Drews OP
- 12 Jordan Thompson OP
- 15 Haleigh Washington MB
- 16 Dana Rettke MB
- 22 Kathryn Plummer OH
- 23 Kelsey Robinson OH
- 24 Chiaka Ogbogu MB
- 27 Avery Skinner OH
- 28 Ashley Evans S

== See also ==
- 2023 FIVB Volleyball Men's Olympic Qualification Tournaments squads
