= Francisco Hervás =

Francisco Hervás may refer to:

- Francisco Hervás (volleyball)
- Francisco Hervás (swimmer)
