= Volleyball at the 2022 South American Games – Women's tournament =

2022 South American Games women's volleyball tournament
Tournament details
- Host country: Paraguay
- City: Asunción
- Dates: 10–14 October 2022
- Teams: 6 (from 1 confederation)
- Venue: 1 (in 1 host city)

Final positions
- Champions: Peru (2nd title)
- Runners-up: Argentina
- Third place: Chile
- Fourth place: Colombia

Tournament statistics
- Matches played: 11

The women's tournament of the volleyball at the 2022 South American Games was held from 10 to 14 October 2022 at the Paraguayan Volleyball Federation facilities in the SND complex cluster in Asunción, Paraguay. It was the sixth appearance of the volleyball women's tournament since the first edition in La Paz 1978 (it was not held from Santiago 1986 to Buenos Aires 2006).

Peru won the gold medal and their second South American Games women's volleyball title after beating Argentina by a narrow 3–2 score in the final. Chile beat the defending champions Colombia 3–0 to win the bronze medal.

== Schedule ==
The tournament was held over a 5-day period, from 10 to 14 October.

PR	Preliminary round	SF	Semi-finals	B	Bronze medal match	F	Gold medal match

Mon 10	Tue 11	Wed 12	Thu 13	Fri 14	
PR	PR	PR	SF	B	F
2 M	2 M	2 M	2 M	3 M	

== Teams ==
A total of six ODESUR NOCs entered teams for the women's tournament.

Teams	App	Previous best performance
Argentina	5th	Gold medal (2014)
Bolivia	2nd	Gold medal (1978)
Chile	3rd	Silver medal (2014)
Colombia	4th	Gold medal (2018)
Paraguay	2nd	Silver medal (1978)
Peru	5th	Gold medal (1982)

=== Rosters ===
Each participating NOC had to enter a roster of 12 players (Technical manual Article 9.3).

== Results ==
All match times are in PYST (UTC−3).

=== Preliminary round ===
The preliminary round or group stage consisted of two groups of 3 teams, each group was played under round-robin format with the top two teams progressing to the semi-finals and the third placed team of each group advancing to the fifth place match.

The pool ranking criteria was the following (Technical manual Articles 5.2 and 5.3):

1. Number of matches won
2. Match points
  - Match won 3–0 or 3–1: 3 points for the winner, 0 points for the loser
  - Match won 3–2: 2 points for the winner, 1 point for the loser
3. Sets ratio
4. Points ratio
5. Result of the match between the tied teams

==== Pool A ====
Pos	Team	Pld	W	L	Pts	SW	SL	SR	SPW	SPL	SPR	Qualification
1	Peru	2	2	0	6	6	0	MAX	150	98	1.531	Semi-finals
2	Chile	2	1	1	3	3	3	1.000	129	107	1.206	Semi-finals
3	Paraguay (H)	2	0	2	0	0	6	0.000	76	150	0.507	Fifth place match

Source: ASU2022
(H) Host

10 October 2022; 11:48	Paraguay	0–3	Chile	Paraguayan Volleyball Federation – SND court 1 Referees: Julio Lluque (PER), Jonatan Escudero (ARG)
10 October 2022; 11:48	(10–25, 10–25, 12–25); Report			Paraguayan Volleyball Federation – SND court 1 Referees: Julio Lluque (PER), Jonatan Escudero (ARG)

11 October 2022; 11:48	Peru	3–0	Chile	Paraguayan Volleyball Federation – SND court 1 Referees: Yeison García (COL), José Blanco (VEN)
11 October 2022; 11:48	(25–19, 25–18, 25–17); Report			Paraguayan Volleyball Federation – SND court 1 Referees: Yeison García (COL), José Blanco (VEN)

12 October 2022; 11:48	Paraguay	0–3	Peru	Paraguayan Volleyball Federation – SND court 1 Referees: Jonatan Escudero (ARG), Andre Calado (BRA)
12 October 2022; 11:48	(15–25, 20–25, 9–25); Report			Paraguayan Volleyball Federation – SND court 1 Referees: Jonatan Escudero (ARG), Andre Calado (BRA)

==== Pool B ====
Pos	Team	Pld	W	L	Pts	SW	SL	SR	SPW	SPL	SPR	Qualification
1	Argentina	2	2	0	6	6	0	MAX	153	104	1.471	Semi-finals
2	Colombia	2	1	1	3	3	3	1.000	140	137	1.022	Semi-finals
3	Bolivia	2	0	2	0	0	6	0.000	98	150	0.653	Fifth place match

Source: ASU2022

10 October 2022; 9:18	Colombia	3–0	Bolivia	Paraguayan Volleyball Federation – SND court 1 Referees: Andrés Checa (ECU), Sebastián Leyton (CHI)
10 October 2022; 9:18	(25-15, 25-21, 25-23); Report			Paraguayan Volleyball Federation – SND court 1 Referees: Andrés Checa (ECU), Sebastián Leyton (CHI)

11 October 2022; 9:18	Argentina	3–0	Bolivia	Paraguayan Volleyball Federation – SND court 1 Referees: Fabián Gal (URU), Julio Lluque (PER)
11 October 2022; 9:18	(25–19, 25–10, 25–10); Report			Paraguayan Volleyball Federation – SND court 1 Referees: Fabián Gal (URU), Julio Lluque (PER)

12 October 2022; 9:18	Colombia	0–3	Argentina	Paraguayan Volleyball Federation – SND court 1 Referees: Cristina Gamarra (PAR), Jaime Suárez (BOL)
12 October 2022; 9:18	(21–25, 26–28, 18–25); Report			Paraguayan Volleyball Federation – SND court 1 Referees: Cristina Gamarra (PAR), Jaime Suárez (BOL)

=== Final round ===
The final round consisted of the fifth place match (between the third placed teams of pools A and B), the semi-finals and the bronze and gold medal matches. The semi-finals match-ups were:

- Semifinal 1: Winners Pool A v Runners-up Pool B
- Semifinal 2: Winners Pool B v Runners-up Pool A

Winners of semi-finals played the gold medal match, while losers played the bronze medal match.

Semi-finals
13 October
Argentina	3
Chile	0
13 October
Peru	3
Colombia	0

Gold medal match
14 October
Argentina	2
Peru	3

Fifth place match
14 October
Paraguay	2
Bolivia	3

Bronze medal match
14 October
Chile	3
Colombia	0

==== Semi-finals ====
13 October 2022; 9:18	Argentina	3–0	Chile	Paraguayan Volleyball Federation – SND court 1 Referees: Fabián Gal (URU), Andrés Checa (ECU)
13 October 2022; 9:18	(25–16, 25–19, 25–21); Report			Paraguayan Volleyball Federation – SND court 1 Referees: Fabián Gal (URU), Andrés Checa (ECU)

13 October 2022; 11:48	Peru	3–0	Colombia	Paraguayan Volleyball Federation – SND court 1 Referees: José Blanco (VEN), Jonatan Escudero (ARG)
13 October 2022; 11:48	(25–14, 25–14, 25–17); Report			Paraguayan Volleyball Federation – SND court 1 Referees: José Blanco (VEN), Jonatan Escudero (ARG)

==== Fifth place match ====
14 October 2022; 9:18	Paraguay	2–3	Bolivia	Paraguayan Volleyball Federation – SND court 1 Referees: Sebastián Leyton (CHI), Julio Lluque (PER)
14 October 2022; 9:18	(25–21, 20–25, 25–16, 19-25, 9-15); Report			Paraguayan Volleyball Federation – SND court 1 Referees: Sebastián Leyton (CHI), Julio Lluque (PER)

==== Bronze medal match ====
14 October 2022; 11:48	Chile	3–0	Colombia	Paraguayan Volleyball Federation – SND court 1 Referees: Jonatan Escudero (ARG), Fabián Gal (URU)
14 October 2022; 11:48	(25–11, 25–22, 25–14); Report			Paraguayan Volleyball Federation – SND court 1 Referees: Jonatan Escudero (ARG), Fabián Gal (URU)

==== Gold medal match ====
14 October 2022; 19:48	Argentina	2–3	Peru	Paraguayan Volleyball Federation – SND court 1 Referees: Cristina Gamarra (PAR), Andre Calado (BRA)
14 October 2022; 19:48	(25–22, 21–25, 25–17, 19-25, 11-15); Report			Paraguayan Volleyball Federation – SND court 1 Referees: Cristina Gamarra (PAR), Andre Calado (BRA)

== Final ranking ==
Rank	Team
1st place, gold medalist(s)	Peru
2nd place, silver medalist(s)	Argentina
3rd place, bronze medalist(s)	Chile
4	Colombia
5	Bolivia
6	Paraguay

2022 Women's South American Volleyball Champions

Peru
Second title

Team roster: Diana de la Peña, María Paula Rodríguez, Maricarmen Guerrero, Aixa Vigil, Kiara Vicente, Ángela Barboza, María José Rojas, Karla Ortiz (c), Nayeli Calderón, Jade Cuya, Ysabella Sánchez, Esmeralda Sánchez (L)
Head coach: Francisco Hervás

== Medalists ==
Gold	Silver	Bronze
Peru Diana de la Peña; María Paula Rodríguez; Maricarmen Guerrero; Aixa Vigil; Kiara Vicente; Ángela Barboza; María José Rojas; Karla Ortiz (c); Nayeli Calderón; Jade Cuya; Ysabella Sánchez; Esmeralda Sánchez (L) Head coach: Francisco Hervás	Argentina Dalma Pérez; Avril García; Julieta Aruga; Guadalupe Martín; Valentina Vaulet; Rosa Reinoso; María Luz Cosulich (c); Julieta Cervini; Marlen Siri; María de la Paz Corbalán; Camila Giraudo; Valentina González (L) Head coach: Marcelo Fabián Silva	Chile Florencia Giglio; Camila Donoso (L); Beatriz Novoa (c); Paula Salinas; Karen Morales; Gabriela Badilla; Elisa Sandrock; Camila Mendoza; Raphaella Aniegbuna; Paula Vallejos; Catalina Nuñez; Petra Schwartzman Head coach: Eduardo Guillaume
