= Yuliya Fomenko =

Yuliya Fomenko may refer to:

- Yuliya Fomenko (runner) (born 1979), Russian middle distance runner
- Yuliya Fomenko (swimmer) (born 1981), Russian Olympic swimmer
- Yuliya Fomenko (volleyball), volleyball player, see 2026 AVC Women's Volleyball Continental Championship squads
