= Seiko Kawamura =

Japanese volleyball player (born 1984)

Personal information
- Full name: Seiko Kawamura
- Nickname: Say
- Born: May 23, 1984 (age 42); Houfu, Yamaguchi, Japan
- Height: 1.74 m (5 ft 9 in)
- Weight: 64 kg (141 lb)
- Spike: 283 cm (111 in)
- Block: 269 cm (106 in)

Volleyball information
- Position: Setter
- Current club: Toyota Auto Body Queenseis
- Number: 6

Seiko Kawamura (河村 聖子 Kawamura Seiko, born 23 May 1984) is a Japanese volleyball player who plays for Toyota Auto Body Queenseis.

== Profile ==
- Her mother, Keiko Okushima, was on the national volleyball team.
- She became a volleyball player at 6 years old.
- While attending high school, the volleyball team won in the Japanese high school league with Megumi Kurihara and Rie Takaki.

== Clubs ==
- MitajiriJoshi High School → JT Marvelous (2003–2009) → Toyota Auto Body Queenseis (2009-)

== National team ==
- Japan 2008 - 1st AVC Women's Cup
