= Rie Takaki =

Japanese volleyball player (born 1983)

Personal information
- Full name: Rie Takaki
- Nickname: Rie
- Born: August 9, 1983 (age 43); Houfu, Yamaguchi, Japan
- Height: 1.76 m (5 ft 9 in)
- Weight: 64 kg (141 lb)
- Spike: 290 cm (114 in)
- Block: 280 cm (110 in)

Volleyball information
- Position: Middle Blocker
- Current club: Victorina Himeji
- Number: 14

National team
Japan(2002)

Rie Takaki (高木 理江 Takaki Rie, born 9 August 1983) is a Japanese volleyball player who plays as vice captain for Victorina Himeji.

== Profile ==
- She became a volleyball player at 10 years old.
- While attending junior high, she played as a wing-spiker.
- While attending high school, the volleyball team won in the Japanese high school league with Megumi Kurihara and Seiko Kawamura.
- She served as a captain of JT Marvelous between 2006 and 2009.
- In June 2011, she retired from JT Marvelous.
- She signed with Victorina Himeji on 2018-07-01

== Clubs ==
- (Japan) Mitajiri Girls' High School (now MakotoEi high)
- (Japan) JT Marvelous (2002–2011)
- (Japan) Victorina Himeji (2018–

== Awards ==
=== Team ===
- 2003 52nd Kurowashiki All Japan Volleyball Championship - Runner-Up, with JT Marvelous.
- 2004 53rd Kurowashiki All Japan Volleyball Championship - Runner-Up, with JT Marvelous.
- 2006-2007 V.Premier League - Runner-Up, with JT Marvelous.
- 2007 56th Kurowashiki All Japan Volleyball Championship - Runner-Up, with JT Marvelous.
- 2009-2010 V.Premier League - Runner-Up, with JT Marvelous.
- 2010 59th Kurowashiki All Japan Volleyball Tournament - Runner-Up, with JT Marvelous.
- 2010-11 V.Premier League - Champion, with JT Marvelous.
- 2011 60th Kurowashiki All Japan Volleyball Tournament - Champion, with JT Marvelous.

=== National team ===
==== Senior team ====
- Japan 2002
