= Airi Miyabe =

Japanese volleyball player (born 1998)

Personal information
- Full name: Airi Miyabe
- Nationality: Japanese
- Born: 29 July 1998 (age 28) Hyogo Prefecture, Japan
- Education: College of Southern Idaho (2017–2018); University of Minnesota (2018–2020)
- Height: 182 cm (6 ft 0 in)
- Weight: 63 kg (139 lb)
- Spike: 313 cm (123 in)
- Block: 290 cm (114 in)

Volleyball information
- Current club: (Japan) Victorina Himeji
- Number: 15 (national team)

Career
- Years: Team
- 2015: Kinrankai Senior Highschool

National team
- Years: Team
- 2015–present: Japan
Honours
Women's volleyball
Representing Japan
AVC Continental Championship
Bronze medal – third place	2026 Tianjin	Team
FIVB Nations League
Silver medal – second place	2024 Bangkok	Team

Airi Miyabe (宮部 藍梨, Miyabe Airi; born 29 July 1998) is a Japanese volleyball player and a member of the Japan women's national volleyball team. She is of mixed Nigerian and Japanese heritage and is the older sister of Ameze Miyabe.

Miyabe competed in the 2015 FIVB Volleyball World Grand Prix. At the club level, she represented Kinrankai Senior High School in 2015.

At the collegiate level in the United States, Miyabe attended the College of Southern Idaho before transferring to the University of Minnesota, where she played for the Minnesota Golden Gophers.

She was also a member of the Japanese national team at the 2024 Olympics.
