= 2022 Women's Pan-American Volleyball Cup =

Volleyball tournament

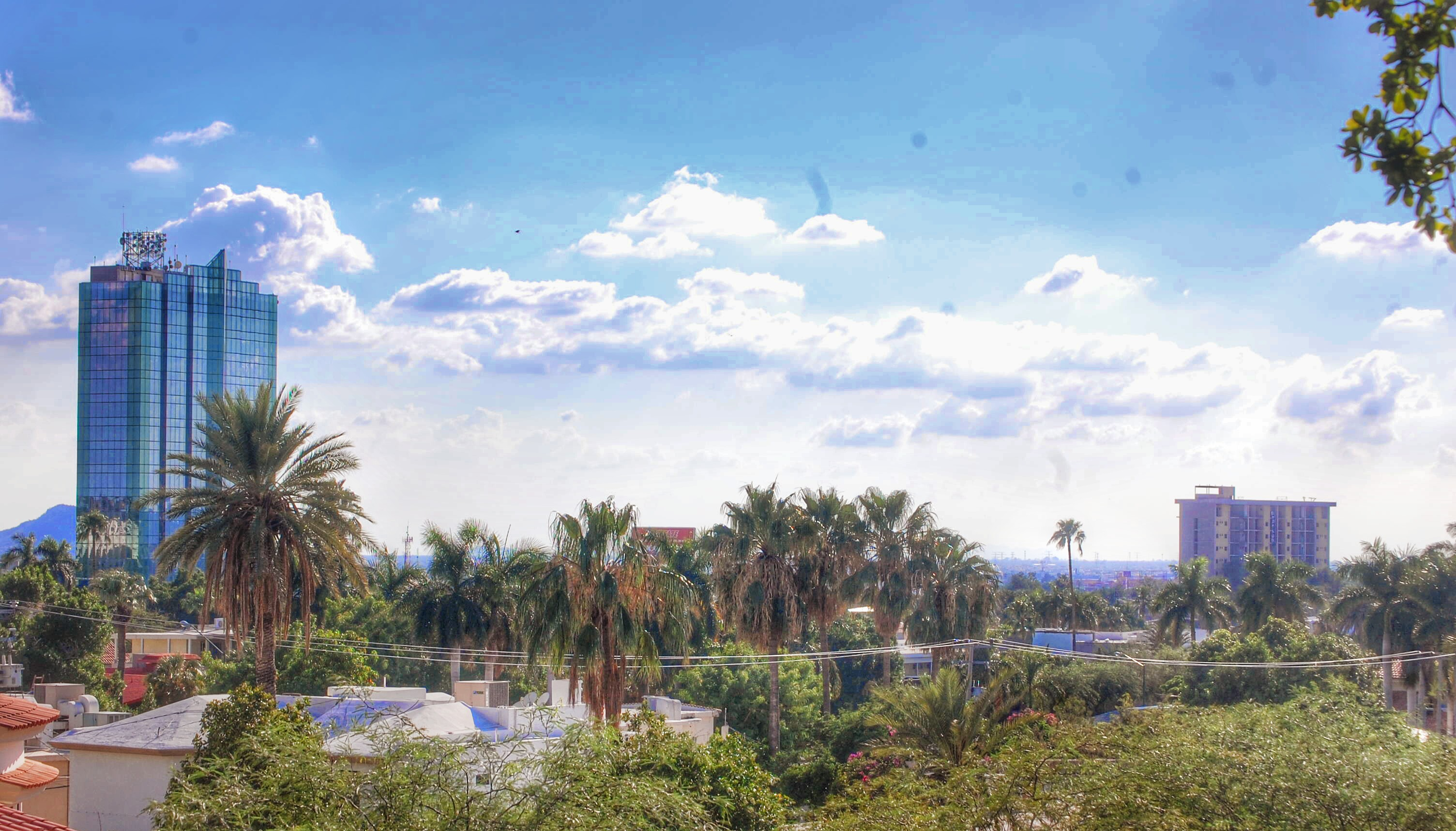
- Hermosillo, host city of the tournament

Tournament details
- Host country: Mexico
- Dates: 19–29 August
- Teams: 10
- Venue: 1 (in 1 host city)

Final positions
- Champions: Dominican Republic (6th title)
- Runners-up: Colombia
- Third place: United States
- Fourth place: Mexico

Tournament awards
- MVP: (Dominican Republic) Niverka Marte

The 2022 Women's Pan-American Volleyball Cup was the 19th edition of the annual women's volleyball tournament. It was held at the Arena Sonora in Hermosillo, Mexico from 19 to 29 August 2022.

The Dominican Republic won the gold medal, its 6th overall, while Colombia finished as runners-up for the first time in its history. The United States defeated Mexico to claim the bronze medal. Dominican Republic's Niverka Marte was the most valuable player.

== Pool composition ==
Pool A	Pool B
Dominican Republic; Puerto Rico; United States; Costa Rica; Peru	Mexico; Cuba; Canada; Nicaragua; Colombia

== Preliminary rounds ==
=== Pool A ===
Pos	Team	Pld	W	L	Pts	SPW	SPL	SPR	SW	SL	SR	Qualification
1	Dominican Republic	4	4	0	18	337	222	1.518	12	2	6.000	Semifinals
2	United States	4	3	1	16	322	284	1.134	11	4	2.750	Quarterfinals
3	Puerto Rico	4	2	2	8	282	250	1.128	6	8	0.750	Quarterfinals
4	Peru	4	1	3	8	304	316	0.962	6	9	0.667	7th–10th classification
5	Costa Rica	4	0	4	0	143	300	0.477	0	12	0.000	7th–10th classification

Date	Time		Score		Set 1	Set 2	Set 3	Set 4	Set 5	Total	Report
21 Aug	14:00	Dominican Republic	3–0	Costa Rica	25–9	25–8	25–9			75–26	Report
21 Aug	18:00	United States	3–1	Peru	25–13	21–25	25–22	25–17		96–77	Report
22 Aug	14:00	Dominican Republic	3–0	Peru	25–13	25–18	25–22			75–53	Report
22 Aug	18:00	United States	3–0	Puerto Rico	25–19	25–16	25–22			75–57	Report
23 Aug	14:00	Peru	3–0	Costa Rica	25–15	25–12	25–14			75–41	Report
23 Aug	18:00	Dominican Republic	3–0	Puerto Rico	25–17	25–11	25–18			75–46	Report
24 Aug	14:00	United States	3–0	Costa Rica	25–14	25–17	25–7			75–38	Report
24 Aug	18:00	Puerto Rico	3–2	Peru	23–25	25–20	16–25	25–17	15–12	104–99	Report
25 Aug	14:00	Puerto Rico	3–0	Costa Rica	25–12	25–14	25–12			75–38	Report
25 Aug	18:00	Dominican Republic	3–2	United States	23–25	24–26	25–16	25–22	15–8	112–97	

=== Pool B ===
Pos	Team	Pld	W	L	Pts	SPW	SPL	SPR	SW	SL	SR	Qualification
1	Colombia	4	4	0	20	305	195	1.564	12	0	MAX	Semifinals
2	Mexico	4	3	1	14	299	242	1.236	9	4	2.250	Quarterfinals
3	Cuba	4	2	2	11	284	271	1.048	7	6	1.167	Quarterfinals
4	Canada	4	1	3	5	259	279	0.928	3	9	0.333	7th–10th classification
5	Nicaragua	4	0	4	0	140	300	0.467	0	12	0.000	7th–10th classification

Date	Time		Score		Set 1	Set 2	Set 3	Set 4	Set 5	Total	Report
21 Aug	16:00	Canada	0–3	Cuba	16–25	26–28	23–25			65–78	Report
21 Aug	20:00	Mexico	3–0	Nicaragua	25–11	25–8	25–9			75–28	Report
22 Aug	16:00	Colombia	3–0	Canada	25–18	25–14	28–26			78–58	Report
22 Aug	20:00	Mexico	3–1	Cuba	24–26	25–16	25–16	25–18		99–76	Report
23 Aug	16:00	Cuba	3–0	Nicaragua	25–7	25–11	25–14			75–32	Report
23 Aug	20:00	Mexico	0–3	Colombia	14–25	25–27	11–25			50–77	Report
24 Aug	16:00	Canada	3–0	Nicaragua	25–10	25–19	25–19			75–48	Report
24 Aug	20:00	Cuba	0–3	Colombia	16–25	22–25	17–25			55–75	Report
25 Aug	16:00	Colombia	3–0	Nicaragua	25–8	25–12	25–12			75–32	Report
25 Aug	20:00	Mexico	3–0	Canada	25–19	25–21	25–21			75–61	

== Classification round ==
=== Classification 7/10 ===
Date	Time		Score		Set 1	Set 2	Set 3	Set 4	Set 5	Total	Report
26 Aug	14:00	Costa Rica	3–2	Nicaragua	19–25	20–25	25–14	25–22	15–13	104–99	Report
26 Aug	16:00	Canada	0–3	Peru	22–25	22–25	18–25			62–75	

== Final rounds ==
=== Quarterfinals ===
Date	Time		Score		Set 1	Set 2	Set 3	Set 4	Set 5	Total	Report
26 Aug	18:00	United States	3–2	Cuba	27–29	22–25	25–22	25–16	19–17	118–109	Report
26 Aug	20:00	Mexico	3–2	Puerto Rico	25–17	25–19	18–25	20–25	15–12	103–98	

=== Final classification 7/8th & 9/10th place ===
Date	Time		Score		Set 1	Set 2	Set 3	Set 4	Set 5	Total	Report
27 Aug	14:00	Nicaragua	0–3	Canada	21–25	14–25	22–25			57–75	
27 Aug	16:00	Costa Rica	0–3	Peru	14–25	17–25	13–25			44–75	

=== Semifinals ===
Date	Time		Score		Set 1	Set 2	Set 3	Set 4	Set 5	Total	Report
27 Aug	18:00	Colombia	3–1	United States	25–16	25–27	25–20	25-20		100–63	
27 Aug	20:00	Dominican Republic	3–1	Mexico	23–25	25–21	25–8	25–14		98–68	

=== Final classification 5/6th place ===
Date	Time		Score		Set 1	Set 2	Set 3	Set 4	Set 5	Total	Report
28 Aug	14:00	Cuba	3–1	Puerto Rico	14–25	25–22	25–23	25–21		89–91	

=== 3rd place match ===
Date	Time		Score		Set 1	Set 2	Set 3	Set 4	Set 5	Total	Report
28 Aug	16:00	United States	3–1	Mexico	25–19	24–26	25–16	25–11		99–72	

=== Final ===
Date	Time		Score		Set 1	Set 2	Set 3	Set 4	Set 5	Total	Report
28 Aug	18:00	Colombia	1–3	Dominican Republic	25–21	13–25	21–25	16–25		75–96	

== Statistics leaders ==
Statistics leaders of the tournament: (Source)

Top Scorers
	Player	Total
1	(United States) Avery Skinner	105
2	(Dominican Republic) Bethania de la Cruz	103
3	(Dominican Republic) Gaila González	102
4	(Mexico) Samantha Bricio	86
5	(Puerto Rico) Pilar Victoria	83

Best Blockers
	Player	Blocks
1	(Dominican Republic) Geraldine Gonzalez	19
2	(Puerto Rico) Paola Rojas	16
3	(United States) Brionne Butler	15
4	(Colombia) Darlevis Mosquera (Cuba) Dayana Martinez	14

Best Servers
	Player	Aces
1	(Dominican Republic) Bethania de la Cruz	20
2	(Dominican Republic) Gaila González	13
3	(Canada) Sydney Grills	11
3	(Puerto Rico) Wilmarie Rivera	11
5	(United States) Tori Dilfer	10

== Final standing ==
Rank	Team
1st place, gold medalist(s)	Dominican Republic
2nd place, silver medalist(s)	Colombia
3rd place, bronze medalist(s)	United States
4	Mexico
5	Cuba
6	Puerto Rico
7	Peru
8	Costa Rica
9	Canada
10	Nicaragua

2022 Women's Pan-American Cup champions

Dominican Republic
6th title

14-woman roster
Florangel Terrero, Yaneirys Rodríguez, Vielka Peralta, Brenda Castillo, Niverka Marte, Cándida Arias, Angélica Hinojosa,
Camila de la Rosa, Madeline Guillén, Yonkaira Peña, Bethania de la Cruz, Samaret Caraballo, Gaila González and Geraldine González
Head coach
Marcos Kwiek

== Individual awards ==
- Most valuable player
  Niverka Marte (DOM)
- Best setter
  María Alejandra Marín (COL)
- Best outside hitters
  Bethania de la Cruz (DOM)
  Avery Skinner (USA)
- Best middle blockers
  Geraldine González (DOM)
  Darlevis Mosquera (COL)
- Best Opposite
  Gaila González (DOM)
- Best scorer
  Avery Skinner (USA)
- Best server
  Bethania de la Cruz (DOM)
- Best libero
  Brenda Castillo (DOM)
- Best digger
  Brenda Castillo (DOM)
- Best receiver
  Brenda Castillo (DOM)

== See also ==
- 2022 Men's Pan-American Volleyball Cup
