= Kyoko Katashita =

Japanese volleyball player (born 1989)

Personal information
- Full name: Kyoko Katashita
- Nickname: Kaz
- Born: July 13, 1989 (age 37); Chikuzen, Fukuoka, Japan
- Height: 1.57 m (5 ft 2 in)
- Weight: 54 kg (119 lb)
- Spike: 270 cm (106 in)

Volleyball information
- Position: Libero
- Current club: Victorina Himeji
- Number: 8

Kyoko Katashita (片下恭子 Katashita Kyoko, born July 13, 1989) is a Japanese volleyball player who played for Victorina Himeji.

== Profiles ==
She became a volleyball player at 6 years old. While attending high school, the volleyball team won the top of Japanese high school with Yuki Kawai.

== Clubs ==
- Higashikyushu Ryukoku High School → Denso Airybees (2008-)
- Victorina Himeji - (2018–2019)

== National team ==
- Japan Junior national team (2007)

== Honors ==
- Team
  - Japan Volleyball League/V.League/V.Premier
    Runners-up (1): 2007-2008
  - Kurowashiki All Japan Volleyball Championship
    Champions (1): 2008
  - Japan V.League Division 2
    Champions (1): 2018-2019
- Individual
  - 2008 - Kurowashiki All Japan Volleyball Championship Best Libero awards
