= Yuki Kawai =

Japanese volleyball player (born 1990)

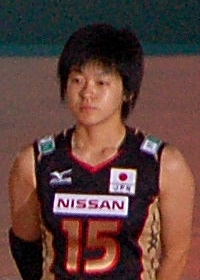

Personal information
- Full name: Yuki Kawai
- Nickname: Kai
- Born: January 22, 1990 (age 36) Hiji, Ōita, Oita, Japan
- Height: 1.68 m (5 ft 6 in)
- Weight: 57 kg (126 lb)
- Spike: 280 cm (110 in)

Volleyball information
- Position: Setter
- Current club: Retired

National team
- Years: Team
- 2007-2008: Japan

Yuki Kawai (河合 由貴, Kawai Yuki; born January 22, 1990) is a former Japanese volleyball player.

== Career ==
Yuki became a volleyball player when in a Primary school. At the time when she was in the 3rd grade of Higashikyushu Ryokoku High School she served as a captain of the team. The team won the top of Japanese high school with Kyoko Katashita.

She retired from JT Marvelous in June 2011. She signed with Victorina Himeji on July 1, 2018. She retired from volleyball in June 2019 after captaining Victorina Himeji to a season championship.

== Clubs ==
- (Japan) Higashi Kyushu Ryukoku High School
- (Japan) JT Marvelous (2008-2011)
- (Japan) Victorina Himeji (2018-2019)

== Awards ==
=== Individual ===
- 2007: Champion in the 6th Asian Youth Volleyball Championship
- 2008: 5th place in the Olympic Games of Beijing
- 2008: Champion in the 14th Asian Junior Volleyball Championship - MVP, Best Setter award
- 2010 Asian Club Championship "Best Setter"

=== Team ===
- 2009-2010 V.Premier League - Runner-Up, with JT Marvelous
- 2010 59th Kurowashiki All Japan Volleyball Tournament - Runner-Up, with JT Marvelous
- 2010-11 V.Premier League - Champion, with JT Marvelous
- 2011 60th Kurowashiki All Japan Volleyball Tournament - Champion, with JT Marvelous
- 2019 V.League Division 2 (V2) Women's Tournament - Champion, with Victorina Himeji

== National team ==
- Japan Youth National Team (2007)
- Japan National Team (2007-)
- Japan Junior National Team (2008)
