= 2026 AVC Women's Volleyball Continental Championship squads =

The 2026 AVC Women's Volleyball Continental Championship was an international volleyball held in China from 21 to 30 August 2026. The 12 national teams involved in the tournament were required to register a squad of up to 14 players. A provisional release list of 25 players per national team had to be submitted to AVC by 22 July 2026, one month prior to the opening match of the tournament. The release lists were made public via Volleyball World website. From the preliminary squad, the final list of at least 12 and at most 14 players (at least one of whom shall be libero) per national team had to be submitted to AVC by 15 August, seven days prior to the opening match of the tournament. The squad lists were published by AVC the following day.

== Pool A ==
=== China ===
The following is the China roster for the 2026 AVC Women's Volleyball Continental Championship.

China women's national volleyball team – 2026 AVC Continental roster
Players
Coaches

Pos.	No.	Name	Age – Date of birth	Height	Club
OH	1	Wu Mengjie	23 – 10 September 2002	1.90 m (6 ft 3 in)	Jiangsu Zenith Steel
OH	2	Zhuang Yushan	23 – 28 April 2003	1.84 m (6 ft 0 in)	Göztepe S.K.
OP	3	Tang Xin	22 – 21 May 2004	1.84 m (6 ft 0 in)	Jiangsu Zenith Steel
S	5	Diao Linyu	32 – 7 April 1994	1.83 m (6 ft 0 in)	Jiangsu Zenith Steel
OP	6	Gong Xiangyu (C)	29 – 21 April 1997	1.89 m (6 ft 2 in)	LOVB Madison
MB	7	Wang Yuanyuan	29 – 14 July 1997	1.96 m (6 ft 5 in)	Galatasaray S.K.
MB	8	Chen Houyu	20 – 8 October 2005	1.97 m (6 ft 6 in)	Shanghai Bright Ubest
MB	9	Wang Aoqian	18 – 15 November 2007	1.96 m (6 ft 5 in)	Shanghai Bright Ubest
OP	10	Yang Shuming	18 – 31 July 2008	1.92 m (6 ft 4 in)	Shanghai Bright Ubest
OH	11	Li Chenxuan	19 – 7 December 2006	1.87 m (6 ft 2 in)	Shandong Rizhao Steel
S	14	Xie Shengyu	22 – 28 May 2004	1.86 m (6 ft 1 in)	Shandong Rizhao Steel
MB	16	Guo Zhongnan	17 – 3 June 2009	1.90 m (6 ft 3 in)	Jiangsu Zenith Steel
OH	17	Ni Feifan	25 – 14 February 2001	1.77 m (5 ft 10 in)	Jiangsu Zenith Steel
L	18	Wang Mengjie	30 – 14 November 1995	1.73 m (5 ft 8 in)	Shandong Rizhao Steel

Head coach

- Zhao Yong

Assistant coach(es)

- Zhang Chen
- Yang Hao
- Yuan Lingxi

Legend

- (C) – team captain
- Club – describes last
  club before the tournament
- Age – describes age
  on 21 August 2026

=== Chinese Taipei ===
The following is the Chinese Taipei roster for the 2026 AVC Women's Volleyball Continental Championship.

Chinese Taipei women's national volleyball team – 2026 AVC Continental roster
Players
Coaches

Pos.	No.	Name	Age – Date of birth	Height	Club
OH	2	Hsu Heng-yun	20 – 29 November 2005	1.74 m (5 ft 9 in)	KingWhale Taipei
OH	3	Xu Zhen-xuan	17 – 11 September 2008	1.76 m (5 ft 9 in)	Yunlin County Jian-huo Junior High
OH	5	Lin Liang-tai	21 – 9 January 2005	1.70 m (5 ft 7 in)	KingWhale Taipei
S	6	Hung Chia-yao	22 – 7 January 2004	1.77 m (5 ft 10 in)	Taipower
OH	7	Lin Shu-ho	27 – 6 February 1999	1.68 m (5 ft 6 in)	Top Speed
MB	9	Kan Ko-hui	23 – 3 September 2002	1.87 m (6 ft 2 in)	KingWhale Taipei
L	10	Hsu Wan-yun	23 – 10 May 2003	1.66 m (5 ft 5 in)	Taipower
OH	11	Tsai Yu-chun	25 – 20 July 2001	1.72 m (5 ft 8 in)	Taipower
S	12	Liao Yi-jen (C)	29 – 8 June 1997	1.65 m (5 ft 5 in)	KingWhale Taipei
OP	13	Chen Chieh	25 – 1 December 2000	1.65 m (5 ft 5 in)	KingWhale Taipei
MB	15	Wen Yi-chin	25 – 21 January 2001	1.65 m (5 ft 5 in)	Top Speed
MB	19	Yeh Yu-wen	25 – 31 July 2001	1.76 m (5 ft 9 in)	CMFC
MB	20	Wu Tzu-hua	17 – 28 July 2009	1.76 m (5 ft 9 in)	Taipei Municipal Ming-hu Junior High
OP	21	Chang Yi-chi	21 – 19 July 2005	1.81 m (5 ft 11 in)	CMFC

Head coach

- Teng Yen-min

Assistant coach(es)

- Ko Kenneth Jeffrey
- Lin Ming-hui
- Chang Sheng-lun

Legend

- (C) – team captain
- Club – describes last
  club before the tournament
- Age – describes age
  on 21 August 2026

=== Iran ===
The following is the Iran roster for the 2026 AVC Women's Volleyball Continental Championship.

Iran women's national volleyball team – 2026 AVC Continental roster
Players
Coaches

Pos.	No.	Name	Age – Date of birth	Height	Club
L	1	Seyedehnegar Hashemi	19 – 3 May 2007	1.66 m (5 ft 5 in)	Shahrdari Tabriz
OH	2	Fatemeh Manzouri	21 – 6 November 2004	1.68 m (5 ft 6 in)	Saipa Tehran
MB	4	Soudabeh Bagherpour	35 – 16 September 1990	1.85 m (6 ft 1 in)	Arka
L	5	Mohadeseh Moshtaghi Khozani	27 – 20 April 1999	1.73 m (5 ft 8 in)	Sepahan
S	6	Shabnam Alikhani (C)	33 – 25 September 1992	1.72 m (5 ft 8 in)	Arka
MB	9	Reyhane Karimi	24 – 1 June 2002	1.93 m (6 ft 4 in)	Sepahan
MB	10	Zahra Karimi	24 – 15 February 2002	1.86 m (6 ft 1 in)	Sepahan
OH	11	Mahsa Kadkhoda	33 – 23 June 1993	1.82 m (6 ft 0 in)	Sepahan
OH	15	Fatemeh Khalili	24 – 22 May 2002	1.84 m (6 ft 0 in)	Sepahan
OH	16	Ayda Valinezhad	19 – 13 March 2007	1.78 m (5 ft 10 in)	Majan
OP	18	Elaheh Poorsaleh	23 – 26 April 2003	1.84 m (6 ft 0 in)	Sepahan
OP	19	Setayeshsadat Hosseini	19 – 10 April 2007	1.89 m (6 ft 2 in)	Majan
MB	66	Yasna Ahankoubroo	18 – 11 March 2008	1.83 m (6 ft 0 in)	Majan
S	99	Ghazaleh Bostan	21 – 1 January 2005	1.72 m (5 ft 8 in)	Shahrdari Tabriz

Head coach

- Alireza Tolookian

Assistant coach(es)

- Hamid Jafarzadeh Fard
- Fatemeh Hassani Sadi
- Niloofar Hojati

Legend

- (C) – team captain
- Club – describes last
  club before the tournament
- Age – describes age
  on 21 August 2026

=== Iraq ===
The following is the Iraq roster for the 2026 AVC Women's Volleyball Continental Championship.

Iraq women's national volleyball team – 2026 AVC Continental roster
Players
Coaches

Pos.	No.	Name	Age – Date of birth	Height	Club
MB	1	Doreen Shamow	20 – 18 August 2006	1.77 m (5 ft 10 in)	Sahnareeb
L	2	Amanda Barbar	29 – 6 May 1997	1.63 m (5 ft 4 in)	Akad Ankawa
MB	3	Vanest Bahjat (C)	25 – 15 November 2000	1.72 m (5 ft 8 in)	Akad Ankawa
L	4	Rakela Ibrahim	20 – 8 November 2005	1.61 m (5 ft 3 in)	Akad Ankawa
OP	5	Helen Othman	25 – 26 June 2001	1.78 m (5 ft 10 in)	Akad Ankawa
S	8	Violet Albilati	27 – 10 February 1999	1.60 m (5 ft 3 in)	Akad Ankawa
OP	9	Tahani Naser	23 – 12 September 2002	1.65 m (5 ft 5 in)	Amant Baghdada
OH	10	Dashne Abdullah	34 – 20 January 1992	1.71 m (5 ft 7 in)	Akad Ankawa
OP	11	Norma Askar	25 – 28 November 2000	1.72 m (5 ft 8 in)	Akad Ankawa
S	13	Hamisha Baban	19 – 3 October 2006	1.68 m (5 ft 6 in)	Sahnareeb
OP	18	Moreen Abba	19 – 15 October 2006	1.69 m (5 ft 7 in)	Qaraqosh
OP	20	Nairy Younan	27 – 25 July 1999	1.70 m (5 ft 7 in)	Akad Ankawa
MB	77	Kazhin Mahmood	27 – 24 January 1999	1.78 m (5 ft 10 in)	Akad Ankawa

Head coach

- Matti Randy

Assistant coach(es)

- Khalis Rafi
- Mustafa Sangar

Legend

- (C) – team captain
- Club – describes last
  club before the tournament
- Age – describes age
  on 21 August 2026

== Pool B ==
=== Thailand ===
The following is the Thailand roster for the 2026 AVC Women's Volleyball Continental Championship.

Thailand women's national volleyball team – 2026 AVC Continental roster
Players
Coaches

Pos.	No.	Name	Age – Date of birth	Height	Club
L	2	Piyanut Pannoy	36 – 10 November 1989	1.71 m (5 ft 7 in)	LOVB Atlanta
S	3	Pornpun Guedpard (C)	33 – 5 May 1993	1.73 m (5 ft 8 in)	Orlando Valkyries
MB	4	Kanyarat Kunmueang	23 – 14 October 2002	1.85 m (6 ft 1 in)	Supreme TIP Chonburi-E.Tech
MB	5	Thatdao Nuekjang	32 – 3 February 1994	1.86 m (6 ft 1 in)	PFU BlueCats Ishikawa Kahoku
OH	6	Warisara Seetaloed	20 – 31 October 2005	1.73 m (5 ft 8 in)	Supreme TIP Chonburi-E.Tech
L	9	Kalyarat Khamwong	21 – 8 June 2005	1.68 m (5 ft 6 in)	Nakhon Ratchasima 3M Films
OH	11	Sasipaporn Janthawisut	29 – 10 June 1997	1.78 m (5 ft 10 in)	Nakhon Ratchasima 3M Films
S	15	Natthanicha Jaisaen	28 – 21 May 1998	1.72 m (5 ft 8 in)	Supreme TIP Chonburi-E.Tech
OP	16	Pimpichaya Kokram	28 – 16 June 1998	1.80 m (5 ft 11 in)	Vandœuvre Nancy Volley-Ball
OH	18	Ajcharaporn Kongyot	31 – 18 June 1995	1.80 m (5 ft 11 in)	Aranmare Yamagata
OH	19	Chatchu-on Moksri	26 – 6 November 1999	1.82 m (6 ft 0 in)	Victorina Himeji
MB	29	Wimonrat Thanapan	24 – 2 April 2002	1.80 m (5 ft 11 in)	Aranmare Yamagata
OH	30	Jidapa Nahuanong	24 – 22 February 2002	1.72 m (5 ft 8 in)	Harrudot Chonburi RMUTT
MB	41	Kaewkalaya Kamulthala	32 – 7 August 1994	1.79 m (5 ft 10 in)	Nakhon Ratchasima 3M Films

Head coach

- (Thailand) Kiattipong Radchatagriengkai

Assistant coach(es)

- (Thailand) Onuma Sittirak
- (Japan) Shin Yoshida
- (Thailand) Teerasak Nakprasong

Legend

- (C) – team captain
- Club – describes last
  club before the tournament
- Age – describes age
  on 21 August 2026

=== Kazakhstan ===
The following is the Kazakhstan roster for the 2026 AVC Women's Volleyball Continental Championship.

Kazakhstan women's national volleyball team – 2026 AVC Continental roster
Players
Coaches

Pos.	No.	Name	Age – Date of birth	Height	Club
OH	1	Perizat Nurbergenova	22 – 29 March 2004	1.80 m (5 ft 11 in)	Zhetysu
MB	7	Yuliya Fomenko	23 – 21 April 2003	1.85 m (6 ft 1 in)	Berel
MB	8	Polina Ufimtseva	30 – 13 November 1995	1.85 m (6 ft 1 in)	Zhetysu
OP	9	Bota Uatayeva	23 – 20 September 2002	1.78 m (5 ft 10 in)	Turan
OH	10	Margarita Belchenko	27 – 21 March 1999	1.77 m (5 ft 10 in)	Kuanysh
L	11	Mariya Syrgina	26 – 15 November 1999	1.60 m (5 ft 3 in)	Zhetysu
OH	13	Kristina Belova (C)	27 – 29 November 1998	1.83 m (6 ft 0 in)	Zhetysu
OH	14	Zhanna Syroyeshkina	27 – 4 June 1999	1.83 m (6 ft 0 in)	Kuanysh
L	15	Madina Beket	26 – 6 November 1999	1.60 m (5 ft 3 in)	Zhetysu
OP	16	Tatyana Nikitina	25 – 15 January 2001	1.85 m (6 ft 1 in)	Zhetysu
MB	17	Valeriya Nastenko	27 – 25 January 1999	1.85 m (6 ft 1 in)	Karaganda
MB	18	Aigul Mulkibayeva	25 – 1 April 2001	1.85 m (6 ft 1 in)	Turan
S	20	Rayanna Dyussenbayeva	22 – 23 June 2004	1.84 m (6 ft 0 in)	Berel
S	99	Irina Kuznetsova	35 – 19 March 1991	1.76 m (5 ft 9 in)	Turan

Head coach

- Askar Shalkibekov

Assistant coach(es)

- Denis Issayev
- Ruslan Ayupov

Legend

- (C) – team captain
- Club – describes last
  club before the tournament
- Age – describes age
  on 21 August 2026

=== Indonesia ===
The following is the Indonesia roster for the 2026 AVC Women's Volleyball Continental Championship.

Indonesia women's national volleyball team – 2026 AVC Continental roster
Players
Coaches

Pos.	No.	Name	Age – Date of birth	Height	Club
L	1	Ema Herawati	29 – 3 February 1997	1.72 m (5 ft 8 in)	Popsivo Polwan
MB	2	Namira Maradanti	20 – 1 May 2006	1.75 m (5 ft 9 in)	Yuso Yogyakarta
OH	3	Tina Salim	17 – 15 July 2009	1.74 m (5 ft 9 in)	O2C
MB	4	Chelsa Nurtomo	19 – 24 June 2007	1.83 m (6 ft 0 in)	Bharata Muda
OH	5	Mediol Yoku (C)	26 – 1 September 1999	1.68 m (5 ft 6 in)	Gresik Petrokimia Pupuk
OH	7	Venisa Oktaviani	16 – 3 October 2009	1.75 m (5 ft 9 in)	JVC
OP	9	Arsela Purnama	29 – 21 January 1997	1.77 m (5 ft 10 in)	Popsivo Polwan
L	10	Indah Guretno	21 – 2 March 2005	1.65 m (5 ft 5 in)	Bank Jatim
OH	11	Ersandrina Devega	26 – 16 December 1999	1.70 m (5 ft 7 in)	TNI AU
S	12	Shakira Wijaya	16 – 7 October 2009	1.70 m (5 ft 7 in)	O2C
MB	15	Geofanny Cahyaningtyas	21 – 7 May 2005	1.74 m (5 ft 9 in)	Gresik Petrokimia Pupuk
OH	21	Azzahra Febyane	19 – 1 February 2007	1.77 m (5 ft 10 in)	Bharata Muda
OP	23	Khanza Ganeshtri	15 – 4 September 2010	1.80 m (5 ft 11 in)	Gresik Petrokimia Pupuk
S	24	Arneta Amelian	24 – 2 May 2002	1.71 m (5 ft 7 in)	Bank Jatim

Head coach

- (Brazil) (Japan) Marcos Sugiyama

Assistant coach(es)

- (Indonesia) Angga Mubarok
- (Indonesia) Bobby Setiawan

Legend

- (C) – team captain
- Club – describes last
  club before the tournament
- Age – describes age
  on 21 August 2026

=== Australia ===
The following is the Australia roster for the 2026 AVC Women's Volleyball Continental Championship.

Australia women's national volleyball team – 2026 AVC Continental roster
Players
Coaches

Pos.	No.	Name	Age – Date of birth	Height	Club
OH	2	Emily Heintzelman	22 – 16 May 2004	1.80 m (5 ft 11 in)	NSW Pheonix
S	3	Mikaela Stevens (C)	28 – 11 July 1998	1.78 m (5 ft 10 in)	NSW Pheonix
L	4	Mali Towers	20 – 28 October 2005	1.74 m (5 ft 9 in)	Dodge City CC
MB	5	Jaiha Birkett	24 – 27 April 2002	1.89 m (6 ft 2 in)	Canberra Heat
OH	8	Caitlin O'Dea	27 – 3 September 1998	1.82 m (6 ft 0 in)
MB	10	Chloe Walker	21 – 13 February 2005	1.91 m (6 ft 3 in)	AO Markopoulo
OH	11	Jesse Mann	22 – 9 February 2004	1.80 m (5 ft 11 in)	Hawaii Rainbow Wahine
OH	17	Georgina Vanloo	21 – 25 June 2005	1.76 m (5 ft 9 in)	Canberra Heat
MB	23	Rachel Linskey	19 – 15 October 2006	1.86 m (6 ft 1 in)	Canberra Heat
L	24	Joclyn Warner	29 – 7 April 1997	1.70 m (5 ft 7 in)	Queensland Pirates
OP	33	Ella Milne	21 – 20 September 2004	1.89 m (6 ft 2 in)	Saskatchewan Huskies
OH	39	Sylvia Musel	24 – 23 March 2002	1.78 m (5 ft 10 in)	ProVolley
S	40	Milla Greber	19 – 10 April 2007	1.76 m (5 ft 9 in)	Canberra Heat
MB	42	Ruby Wright	20 – 7 August 2006	1.84 m (6 ft 0 in)	NSW Phoenix

Head coach

- Russell Borgeaud

Assistant coach(es)

- Nicole Hannan

Legend

- (C) – team captain
- Club – describes last
  club before the tournament
- Age – describes age
  on 21 August 2026

== Pool C ==
=== Japan ===
The following is the Japan roster for the 2026 AVC Women's Volleyball Continental Championship.

Japan women's national volleyball team – 2026 AVC Continental roster
Players
Coaches

Pos.	No.	Name	Age – Date of birth	Height	Club
OH	1	Yukiko Wada	24 – 2 January 2002	1.74 m (5 ft 9 in)	NEC Red Rockets Kawasaki
MB	3	Haruyo Shimamura	34 – 4 March 1992	1.82 m (6 ft 0 in)	Gwangju AI Peppers
OH	4	Mayu Ishikawa (C)	26 – 14 May 2000	1.74 m (5 ft 9 in)	Igor Gorgonzola Novara
OH	5	Yoshino Sato	24 – 12 November 2001	1.78 m (5 ft 10 in)	NEC Red Rockets Kawasaki
S	6	Nanami Seki	27 – 12 June 1999	1.71 m (5 ft 7 in)	UYBA Volley
S	7	Erika Sakae	35 – 3 April 1991	1.68 m (5 ft 6 in)	Saga Hisamitsu Springs
L	8	Manami Kojima	31 – 7 November 1994	1.58 m (5 ft 2 in)	LOVB Salt Lake
MB	11	Nichika Yamada	26 – 24 February 2000	1.84 m (6 ft 0 in)	NEC Red Rockets Kawasaki
L	12	Satomi Fukudome	28 – 23 November 1997	1.62 m (5 ft 4 in)	Victorina Himeji
MB	13	Maki Yamaguchi	27 – 13 March 1999	1.75 m (5 ft 9 in)	Kurobe AquaFairies
MB	15	Airi Miyabe	28 – 29 July 1998	1.81 m (5 ft 11 in)	Victorina Himeji
OH	16	Hinata Shigihara	25 – 25 February 2001	1.77 m (5 ft 10 in)	Queenseis Kariya
OH	22	Ayane Kitamado	22 – 6 July 2004	1.83 m (6 ft 0 in)	Saga Hisamitsu Springs
OH	26	Miku Akimoto	20 – 18 August 2006	1.85 m (6 ft 1 in)	Dresdner SC 1898

Head coach

- (Turkey) Ferhat Akbaş

Assistant coach(es)

- (Japan) Gakuto Hashimoto
- (Japan) Shun Toyokihara
- (Japan) Takayuki Kaneko

Legend

- (C) – team captain
- Club – describes last
  club before the tournament
- Age – describes age
  on 21 August 2026

=== Vietnam ===
The following is the Vietnam roster for the 2026 AVC Women's Volleyball Continental Championship.

Vietnam women's national volleyball team – 2026 AVC Continental roster
Players
Coaches

Pos.	No.	Name	Age – Date of birth	Height	Club
OP	1	Nguyễn Thị Trà My	22 – 7 July 2004	1.78 m (5 ft 10 in)	VTV Bình Điền Long An
OH	3	Trần Thị Thanh Thúy (C)	28 – 12 November 1997	1.90 m (6 ft 3 in)	Gunman Green Wings
OH	5	Bùi Thị Ánh Thảo	17 – 4 May 2009	1.70 m (5 ft 7 in)	Hà Nội Tasco Auto
OH	6	Phạm Quỳnh Hương	18 – 14 February 2008	1.85 m (6 ft 1 in)	Binh chủng Thông tin
OH	7	Nguyễn Thị Uyên	27 – 18 August 1999	1.80 m (5 ft 11 in)	LP Bank Ninh Bình
MB	8	Lê Thanh Thúy	31 – 23 May 1995	1.80 m (5 ft 11 in)	Hà Nội Tasco Auto
S	9	Vi Thị Yến Nhi	24 – 12 January 2002	1.75 m (5 ft 9 in)	Hà Nội Tasco Auto
MB	10	Lê Như Anh	21 – 23 July 2005	1.77 m (5 ft 10 in)	VTV Bình Điền Long An
L	12	Nguyễn Khánh Đang	25 – 3 October 2000	1.58 m (5 ft 2 in)	Hà Nội Tasco Auto
S	14	Võ Thị Kim Thoa	28 – 18 March 1998	1.73 m (5 ft 8 in)	VTV Bình Điền Long An
MB	15	Lưu Thị Huệ	27 – 1 February 1999	1.85 m (6 ft 1 in)	LP Bank Ninh Bình
L	18	Lê Thị Yến	28 – 15 September 1997	1.68 m (5 ft 6 in)	Đức Giang Chemical
MB	26	Trần Thị Bích Thủy	25 – 11 December 2000	1.83 m (6 ft 0 in)	Đức Giang Chemical

Head coach

- Nguyễn Tuấn Kiệt

Assistant coach(es)

- Nguyễn Thị Ngọc Hoa
- Nguyễn Ngọc Dũng

Legend

- (C) – team captain
- Club – describes last
  club before the tournament
- Age – describes age
  on 21 August 2026

=== South Korea ===
The following is the South Korea roster for the 2026 AVC Women's Volleyball Continental Championship.

South Korea – 2026 AVC Continental roster
Players
Coaches

Pos.	No.	Name	Age – Date of birth	Height	Club
OH	1	Lee Ye-lim	28 – 10 January 1998	1.75 m (5 ft 9 in)	Suwon Hyundai Hillstate
MB	2	Lee Ju-ah	26 – 21 August 2000	1.85 m (6 ft 1 in)	Hwaseong IBK Altos
S	3	Kim Da-in	27 – 15 October 1998	1.72 m (5 ft 8 in)	Suwon Hyundai Hillstate
L	4	Han Da-hye	31 – 28 February 1995	1.64 m (5 ft 5 in)	Gwangju AI Peppers
MB	6	Park Eun-jin	26 – 15 December 1999	1.87 m (6 ft 2 in)	Anyang Jung Kwan Jang
OP	9	Na Hyun-soo	26 – 15 December 1999	1.83 m (6 ft 0 in)	Suwon Hyundai Hillstate
OH	11	Yuk Seo-young	25 – 9 June 2001	1.80 m (5 ft 11 in)	Hwaseong IBK Altos
MB	12	Lee Da-hyeon	24 – 11 November 2001	1.85 m (6 ft 1 in)	Incheon Heungkuk Life Insurance
OP	13	Park Eun-seo	23 – 16 April 2003	1.76 m (5 ft 9 in)	Gwangju AI Peppers
OP	14	Jeong Yun-ju	23 – 14 April 2003	1.78 m (5 ft 10 in)	Incheon Heungkuk Life Insurance
S	21	Lee Su-yeon	19 – 5 November 2006	1.77 m (5 ft 10 in)	Gimcheon Korea Hi-Pass
OH	22	Kim Hyo-im	18 – 22 September 2007	1.64 m (5 ft 5 in)	GS Caltex Seoul Kixx
L	23	Yu Ga-ram	20 – 30 September 2005	1.66 m (5 ft 5 in)	GS Caltex Seoul Kixx
OH	97	Kang So-hwi (C)	29 – 18 July 1997	1.80 m (5 ft 11 in)	Gimcheon Korea Hi-Pass

Head coach

- Cha Sang-hyun

Assistant coach(es)

- Lee Sook-ja
- Cheon Chang-beom
- Jo Doo-young

Legend

- (C) – team captain
- Club – describes last
  club before the tournament
- Age – describes age
  on 21 August 2026

=== Hong Kong, China ===
The following is the Hong Kong roster for the 2026 AVC Women's Volleyball Continental Championship.

Hong Kong – 2026 AVC Continental roster
Players
Coaches

Pos.	No.	Name	Age – Date of birth	Height	Club
L	1	Cheung Hui-nok Michelle (C)	25 – 24 January 2001	1.62 m (5 ft 4 in)	International
S	3	Fung Tsz-yan	32 – 13 July 1994	1.77 m (5 ft 10 in)	Hip Hing
S	6	Wong Wan-wun	20 – 11 April 2006	1.61 m (5 ft 3 in)	International
OH	7	Tang Sum-yuen	18 – 1 July 2008	1.74 m (5 ft 9 in)	Victory
OH	8	Chim Wing-lam	28 – 8 November 1997	1.73 m (5 ft 8 in)	Hip Hing
L	10	Lee Kit-sum	19 – 13 May 2007	1.59 m (5 ft 3 in)	CYT
S	11	Suen Yee-tung	26 – 22 July 2000	1.80 m (5 ft 11 in)
OH	12	Pang Wing-lam	29 – 11 February 1997	1.73 m (5 ft 8 in)	Hip Hing
OP	14	Shum Lam	26 – 7 July 2000	1.73 m (5 ft 8 in)	International
OH	15	Yu Ying-chi	34 – 7 August 1992	1.69 m (5 ft 7 in)	International
MB	17	Fong Ka-yi	24 – 27 July 2002	1.80 m (5 ft 11 in)	International
MB	21	Leung Nga-yee	33 – 12 May 1993	1.77 m (5 ft 10 in)	Hip Hing
OP	25	Halimah Zampaligre Wilson	20 – 3 March 2006	1.72 m (5 ft 8 in)	CYT
MB	30	Yim Wing-ni	26 – 30 July 2000	1.79 m (5 ft 10 in)	KT

Head coach

- Kwok Kin-chueh

Assistant coach(es)

- Yeung Sau-mei
- Li Yuk-hing

Legend

- (C) – team captain
- Club – describes last
  club before the tournament
- Age – describes age
  on 21 August 2026
