= Volleyball at the 2022 South American Games =

Volleyball competitions at the 2022 South American Games

- Venue: Federación Paraguaya de Voleibol – SND complex
- Dates: 4−14 October 2022
- Competitors: 132 from 6 nations
- Teams: 11 (5 men and 6 women)

Medalists
gold medal	Chile (men)
gold medal	Peru (women)
silver medal	Colombia (men)
silver medal	Argentina (women)
bronze medal	Peru (men)
bronze medal	Chile (women)

Volleyball competitions at the 2022 South American Games in Asunción, Paraguay were held between 4 and 14 October 2022 at the Paraguayan Volleyball Federation facilities located within the SND complex cluster.

Two medal events were scheduled to be contested: a men's and women's tournament. A total of 132 athletes (60 athletes–5 teams for men and 72 athletes–6 teams for women) competed in the events. Both tournaments were open competitions without age restrictions.

Argentina and Colombia were the defending champions of the South American Games men's and women's volleyball events. Argentina had won all previous men's tournament but did not take part in this edition while Colombia had won the women's tournament in the Cochabamba 2018 edition.

Chile and Peru won the gold medal in the men's and women's events respectively.

== Participating nations ==
A total of 6 ODESUR nations registered teams for the volleyball events. Each nation was able to enter a maximum of 24 athletes (one team of 12 players per gender). Bolivia, Chile, Colombia, hosts Paraguay and Peru participated in both men's and women's tournament. Argentina participated in the women's tournament.

- Argentina (12 players)
- Bolivia (24)
- Chile (24)
- Colombia (24)
- Paraguay (24)
- Peru (24)

== Schedule ==
The competition schedule is as follows:

G	Group stage	½	Semifinals	B	Bronze medal match	F/G	Final/Gold medal match

Date Event	Tue 4	Wed 5	Thu 6	Fri 7	Sat 8	Sun 9	Mon 10	Tue 11	Wed 12	Thu 13	Fri 14	
Men	G	G	G	G	G							
Women							G	G	G	½	B	F

== Medal summary ==
=== Medal table ===
* Host nation (Paraguay)

Rank	Nation	Gold	Silver	Bronze	Total
1	Chile (CHI)	1	0	1	2
1	Peru (PER)	1	0	1	2
3	Argentina (ARG)	0	1	0	1
3	Colombia (COL)	0	1	0	1
Totals (4 entries)		2	2	2	6

=== Medalists ===
Event	Gold	Silver	Bronze
Men's tournament	Chile; Dusan Bonacic; Esteban Villarreal; Gabriel Araya; Jaime Bravo; Kaj Bonacic; Sebastián Albornoz; Sebastián Castillo; Tomás Parraguirre; Tomás Gago; Vicente Ibarra; Vicente Parraguirre; Vicente Mardones	Colombia; Daniel Medina; Harry Copete; Jhon Cuello; Juan Estupiñan; Juan Velasco; Leiner Aponzá; Oliver Murillo; Orian Medina; Ronnie Galvis; Roosvuelt Ramos; Samuel Jaramillo; Santiago Ruiz	Peru; Álvaro Hidalgo; Benjamín Patrón; Benny Bernaola; Bruno Seminario; Daniel Porras; Daniel Barbieri; Eduardo Romay; Francis Mendoza; Hiroshi la Torre; Jassir Morón; Juan Silva-Santisteban; Sebastián Blanco
Women's tournament	Peru; Aixa Vigil; Ángela Barboza; Diana de la Peña; Esmeralda Sánchez; Jade Cuya; Karla Ortiz; Kiara Vicente; María José Rojas; María Paula Rodríguez; Maricarmen Guerrero; Nayeli Calderón; Ysabella Sánchez	Argentina; Avril García; Camila Giraudo; Dalma Pérez; Guadalupe Martín; Julieta Aruga; Julieta Cervini; María de la Paz Corbalán; María Luz Cosulich; Marlen Siri; Rosa Reinoso; Valentina González; Valentina Vaulet	Chile; Beatriz Novoa; Camila Donoso; Camila Mendoza; Catalina Núñez; Elisa Sandrock; Florencia Giglio; Gabriela Badilla; Karen Morales; Paula Vallejos; Paula Salinas; Petra Schwartzman; Raphaella Aniegbuna

== Men's tournament ==
Pos	Team	Pld	W	L	Pts	SW	SL	SR	SPW	SPL	SPR	Final result
1	Chile (C)	4	4	0	12	12	0	MAX	302	200	1.510	Gold medal
2	Colombia	4	3	1	7	9	7	1.286	341	330	1.033	Silver medal
3	Peru	4	2	2	7	8	6	1.333	303	303	1.000	Bronze medal
4	Paraguay (H)	4	1	3	4	5	9	0.556	299	311	0.961	Fourth place
5	Bolivia	4	0	4	0	0	12	0.000	202	303	0.667	Fifth place

Source: ASU2022
Rules for classification: 1) Matches won; 2) Points; 3) Sets Ratio; 4)Points ratio; 5) Head-to-head result.
(C) Champion; (H) Host

== Women's tournament ==
=== Preliminary round ===
==== Pool A ====
Pos	Team	Pld	W	L	Pts	SW	SL	SR	SPW	SPL	SPR	Qualification
1	Peru	2	2	0	6	6	0	MAX	150	98	1.531	Semi-finals
2	Chile	2	1	1	3	3	3	1.000	129	107	1.206	Semi-finals
3	Paraguay (H)	2	0	2	0	0	6	0.000	76	150	0.507	Fifth place match

Source: ASU2022
(H) Host

==== Pool B ====
Pos	Team	Pld	W	L	Pts	SW	SL	SR	SPW	SPL	SPR	Qualification
1	Argentina	2	2	0	6	6	0	MAX	153	104	1.471	Semi-finals
2	Colombia	2	1	1	3	3	3	1.000	140	137	1.022	Semi-finals
3	Bolivia	2	0	2	0	0	6	0.000	98	150	0.653	Fifth place match

Source: ASU2022

=== Final round ===
Semi-finals
13 October
Argentina	3
Chile	0
13 October
Peru	3
Colombia	0

Gold medal match
14 October
Argentina	2
Peru	3

Fifth place match
14 October
Paraguay	2
Bolivia	3

Bronze medal match
14 October
Chile	3
Colombia	0

=== Final standings ===
Rank	Team
1st place, gold medalist(s)	Peru
2nd place, silver medalist(s)	Argentina
3rd place, bronze medalist(s)	Chile
4	Colombia
5	Bolivia
6	Paraguay
