= Klistan Lawrence =

Puerto Rican volleyball player (born 2003)

Personal information
- Full name: Klistan Lawrence Vidal
- Nationality: Puerto Rico
- Born: 7 January 2003 (age 23); Cuba
- Height: 2.01 m (6 ft 7 in)
- Weight: 93 kg (205 lb)
- Spike: 365 cm (12 ft 0 in)
- Block: 346 cm (11 ft 4 in)

Volleyball information
- Position: Opposite

Career
| Years | Teams |
|---|---|
| 2021–2022; 2022–2023; 2023–2024; 2024– | Long Beach State; Power Volley Milano; Volley Lupi Santa Croce; Pallavolo Franco Tigano |

National team
| 2019; 2022– | United States U19; Puerto Rico |
Honours
Men's volleyball
Representing Puerto Rico

Klistan Lawrence (born 7 January 2003) is a Puerto Rican volleyball player. He is a member of the Puerto Rico men's national volleyball team, representing the team at the 2022 FIVB Volleyball Men's World Championship.

== Personal life ==
Lawrence was born in Cuba and holds dual Cuban and Puerto Rican citizenship.

== Career ==
Lawrence signed for Long Beach State for the 2022 season, but left the team before playing any official matches.

In September 2022, Lawrence signed for Italian team Power Volley Milano.

Lawrence represented the United States at youth level, playing in the 2019 FIVB Volleyball Boys' U19 World Championship.

== Achievements ==
=== Individually ===
- 2023: NORCECA Championship – Best outside hitter
- 2023: NORCECA Championship – Best scorer
