= 2023 Men's NORCECA Volleyball Championship =

28th edition, held in Charleston, West Virginia, US

2023 Men's NORCECA Championship

Tournament details
- Host country: United States
- City: Charleston
- Dates: 5–10 September 2023
- Teams: 7
- Venue: 1 (in 1 host city)

Final positions
- Champions: United States (10th title)
- Runners-up: Canada
- Third place: Cuba
- Fourth place: Dominican Republic

Tournament awards
- MVP: (United States) Micah Christenson
- Best Setter: (Canada) Luke Herr
- Best OH: (Puerto Rico) Klistan Lawrence (Canada) Stephen Maar
- Best MB: (Puerto Rico) Antonio Elias Rodríguez (Canada) Danny Demyanenko
- Best OPP: (Canada) Arthur Szwarc
- Best Libero: (Mexico) Hiram Bravo Moreno

Tournament statistics
- Matches played: 17
- Attendance: 6,934 (408 per match)
- Best scorer: (Puerto Rico) Klistan Lawrence (91 points)
- Best server: (Cuba) Miguel Ángel López (0.68 Avg)
- Best digger: (Mexico) Hiram Bravo Moreno (2.46 Avg)
- Best receiver: (United States) Erik Shoji (54.00%)

The 2023 Men's NORCECA Volleyball Championship was the 28th edition of the tournament, and was played from 5 to 10 September 2023 in Charleston, West Virginia, the United States. The top three teams of the tournament qualified for the 2025 FIVB Volleyball Men's World Championship as the NORCECA representatives.

== Competing nations ==
The following national teams have qualified:

Pool A	Pool B
Canada	Cuba
Dominican Republic	Puerto Rico
Mexico	Suriname
	United States

== Pool standing procedure ==
1. Number of matches won
2. Match points
3. Points ratio
4. Sets ratio
5. Result of the last match between the tied teams

Match won 3–0: 5 match points for the winner, 0 match points for the loser
Match won 3–1: 4 match points for the winner, 1 match point for the loser
Match won 3–2: 3 match points for the winner, 2 match points for the loser

== Preliminary round ==
=== Pool A ===
Pos	Team	Pld	W	L	Pts	SPW	SPL	SPR	SW	SL	SR	Qualification
1	Canada	2	2	0	10	150	87	1.724	6	0	MAX	Semifinals
2	Dominican Republic	2	1	1	5	106	138	0.768	3	3	1.000	Quarterfinals
3	Mexico	2	0	2	0	119	150	0.793	0	6	0.000	Quarterfinals

Source: norceca.net

Date	Time		Score		Set 1	Set 2	Set 3	Set 4	Set 5	Total	Report
5 Sep	15:00	Canada	3–0	Dominican Republic	25–11	25–8	25–12			75–31	P2 P3
6 Sep	17:00	Canada	3–0	Mexico	25–18	25–18	25–20			75–56	P2 P3
7 Sep	17:00	Dominican Republic	3–0	Mexico	25–21	25–21	25–21			75–63	P2 P3

=== Pool B ===
Pos	Team	Pld	W	L	Pts	SPW	SPL	SPR	SW	SL	SR	Qualification
1	United States (H)	3	3	0	13	261	179	1.458	9	2	4.500	Semifinals
2	Cuba	3	2	1	12	252	219	1.151	8	3	2.667	Quarterfinals
3	Puerto Rico	3	1	2	5	174	208	0.837	3	6	0.500	Quarterfinals
4	Suriname	3	0	3	0	144	225	0.640	0	9	0.000	6th place match

Source: norceca.net
(H) Host

Date	Time		Score		Set 1	Set 2	Set 3	Set 4	Set 5	Total	Report
5 Sep	17:00	Cuba	3–0	Puerto Rico	25–21	25–19	25–15			75–55	P2 P3
5 Sep	19:30	United States	3–0	Suriname	25–14	25–9	25–10			75–33	P2 P3
6 Sep	15:00	Suriname	0–3	Cuba	11–25	19–25	23–25			53–75	P2 P3
6 Sep	19:30	Puerto Rico	0–3	United States	14–25	18–25	12–25			44–75	P2 P3
7 Sep	15:00	Suriname	0–3	Puerto Rico	22–25	15–25	21–25			58–75	P2 P3
7 Sep	19:30	United States	3–2	Cuba	25–22	25–17	24–26	22–25	15–12	111–102	P2 P3

== Final round ==
Quarterfinals
8 September
Cuba	3
Mexico	0
8 September
Dominican Republic	3
Puerto Rico	0

Semifinals
9 September
Canada	3
Cuba	2
9 September
United States	3
Dominican Republic	0

Final
10 September
Canada	0
United States	3
3rd place match
10 September
Cuba	3
Dominican Republic	0

5th place match
9 September
Mexico	3
Puerto Rico	1

6th place match
10 September
Puerto Rico	3
Suriname	1

=== Quarterfinals ===
Date	Time		Score		Set 1	Set 2	Set 3	Set 4	Set 5	Total	Report
8 Sep	17:00	Cuba	3–0	Mexico	25–20	25–15	25–23			75–58	P2 P3
8 Sep	19:30	Dominican Republic	3–0	Puerto Rico	25–19	25–21	32–30			82–70	P2 P3

=== 5th place match ===
Date	Time		Score		Set 1	Set 2	Set 3	Set 4	Set 5	Total	Report
9 Sep	15:00	Mexico	3–1	Puerto Rico	25–22	27–29	25–20	25–20		102–91	P2 P3

=== Semifinals ===
Date	Time		Score		Set 1	Set 2	Set 3	Set 4	Set 5	Total	Report
9 Sep	17:00	United States	3–0	Dominican Republic	25–22	25–12	25–14			75–48	P2 P3
9 Sep	19:30	Canada	3–2	Cuba	18–25	25–21	25–17	24–26	15–13	107–102	P2 P3

=== 6th place match ===
Date	Time		Score		Set 1	Set 2	Set 3	Set 4	Set 5	Total	Report
10 Sep	15:00	Puerto Rico	3–1	Suriname	25–11	21–25	25–19	25–14		96–69	P2 P3

=== 3rd place match ===
Date	Time		Score		Set 1	Set 2	Set 3	Set 4	Set 5	Total	Report
10 Sep	17:00	Cuba	3–0	Dominican Republic	25–15	25–14	25–16			75–45	P2 P3

=== Final ===
Date	Time		Score		Set 1	Set 2	Set 3	Set 4	Set 5	Total	Report
10 Sep	19:30	Canada	0–3	United States	20–25	14–25	22–25			56–75	P2 P3

== Final standing ==
Rank	Team
1st place, gold medalist(s)	United States
2nd place, silver medalist(s)	Canada
3rd place, bronze medalist(s)	Cuba
4	Dominican Republic
5	Mexico
6	Puerto Rico
7	Suriname

Qualified for the 2025 World Championship

2023 Men's NORCECA champions

United States
10th title

== Awards ==
The following players were awarded for their performance during the competition.

- Most valuable player
  Micah Christenson (USA)
- Best setter
  Luke Herr (CAN)
- Best outside spikers
  Klistan Lawrence (PUR)
  Stephen Maar (CAN)
- Best opposite spiker
  Arthur Szwarc (CAN)
- Best middle blockers
  Antonio Elias Rodriguez (PUR)
  Danny Demyanenko (CAN)
- Best libero
  Hiram Bravo Moreno (MEX)
- Best scorer
  Klistan Lawrence (PUR)
- Best receiver
  Erik Shoji (USA)
- Best server
  Miguel Ángel López (CUB)
- Best digger
  Hiram Bravo Moreno (MEX)

== See also ==
- 2023 Women's NORCECA Volleyball Championship
