= Satomi Fukudome =

Japanese volleyball player (born 1997)

Personal information
- Full name: Satomi Fukudome
- Nationality: Japanese
- Born: 23 November 1997 (age 28) Kyoto City, Kyoto, Japan
- Education: Ryukoku University
- Height: 1.62 m (5 ft 4 in)
- Weight: 60 kg (132 lb)
- Spike: 275 cm (108 in)
- Block: 260 cm (102 in)

Volleyball information
- Position: Libero
- Current club: (Japan) Victorina Himeji
- Number: 12 (national); 13 (club)

Career
- Years: Team
- 2013–2016 2016–2020 2020–2024 2024–2025 2025-present: (Japan) Kyoto Tachibana High School (Japan) Ryukoku University (Japan) Denso Airybees (Italy) Vero Volley Milano (Japan) Victorina Himeji

National team
- Years: Team
- 2022–: Japan
Honours
Women's volleyball
Representing Japan
AVC Continental Championship
Bronze medal – third place	2026 Tianjin	Team
Nations League
Silver medal – second place	2024 Bangkok	Team

Satomi Fukudome (福留 慧美, Fukudome Satomi; born 23 November 1997) is a Japanese professional volleyball player. She plays in the SV.League for Victorina Himeji.

== Career ==
On November 25, 2019. It was announced that she would join Denso Airybees. She officially join the team in 2020.

In 2022, she was selected for Japan women's national volleyball team. She was selected for the training camp for the 2022 World Championship, which would begin in late September. She also participated in the Paris Olympic Pre-Games, a warm-up tournament for the world championship. Then, she was selected for the World Championship team.

In 2023, she participated in the Paris Olympic Qualifiers and played as starting libero.

In June 2024, after 4 season with Denso, she parted ways with the team to pursue career overseas. In September the same year, it was announced that she would join Vero Volley Milano.

In July 2025, she joined Victorina Himeji.

== Awards ==
=== Individual ===
- 2019 West Japan Intercollegiate Championship - Best Libero

=== National Team ===
- (Thailand) 2024 FIVB Volleyball Women's Nations League - - Runner-up
- (China) 2026 AVC Women's Volleyball Continental Championship - - Bronze Medal
