= Avery Skinner (volleyball) =

American volleyball player (born 1999)

Personal information
- Full name: Avery A. Skinner
- Nationality: United States
- Born: April 25, 1999 (age 27)
- Hometown: Katy, Texas, U.S.
- Height: 6 ft 1 in (1.86 m)
- Weight: 165 lb (75 kg)
- Spike: 122 in (309 cm)
- Block: 118 in (299 cm)
- Education: Kentucky / Baylor

Volleyball information
- Position: Outside hitter
- Current club: (Italy) Pallavollo Scandicci
- Number: 4 (club) 3 (national team)

Career
Years	Teams
2017–2020	(United States) Kentucky
2021	(United States) Baylor
2022–2023	(France) Béziers Volley
2023–2025	(Italy) Chieri
2025-	(Italy) Savino Del Bene Volley

National team
2022–	United States
Medal record
Indoor Volleyball
Representing the United States
Olympic Games
Silver medal – second place	2024 Paris	Team
NORCECA Championship
Silver medal – second place	2023 Quebec City
NORCECA Pan-American Cup
Bronze medal – third place	2022 Hermosillo
NORCECA Pan American Cup Final Six
Silver medal – second place	2022 Santo Domingo

Avery A. Skinner (born April 25, 1999) is an American professional volleyball player who plays as an outside hitter for the United States women's national volleyball team and Italian Series A1 professional team Savino del Bene Scandicci.

== Personal life ==
Skinner is from Katy, Texas. In addition to playing volleyball, she was tap, ballet, and musical theater dancer before deciding at age 13 to focus solely on volleyball. Skinner played school volleyball for HCYA and she helped the team win state championships in 2015 and 2016. She also played club volleyball for Houston's Skyline. She considered playing volleyball for Baylor, Iowa State, and Texas A&M but ultimately settled on Kentucky as she wanted to see what life was like outside of Texas.

Skinner is the daughter of Rebecca Skinner and Brian Skinner, who was a star basketball player at Baylor and played in the NBA for 14 years. Her sister, Madisen, played volleyball with her at Kentucky.

== Career ==
=== College ===
Skinner played college volleyball for a total of five years, as she opted to use the extra year of eligibility granted by the NCAA due to the COVID-19 pandemic.

From 2017 to 2020, she played for the Kentucky Wildcats. As a freshman in 2017, she finished second on the team with 362 kills and was named to the SEC All-Freshman Team. In 2019, plagued by a knee injury, she only played in nine matches. However, she was able to return to full strength in 2020 and credited the extra time off due to the COVID-19 quarantines that were in place at the time allowing her more time to rehabilitate her injuries. As a result of her strong senior season, she was named an AVCA First Team All-American after leading Kentucky to its first ever NCAA championship title in the 2020 NCAA Tournament. She was named on the NCAA Final Four All-Tournament Team. She graduated from Kentucky with two degrees in interdisciplinary early childhood education and communication studies and disorders.

She opted to play her extra year of eligibility as a graduate transfer for the Baylor Bears. She finished the season as an Honorable Mention All-American and had the second-most kills on the team with 355 in her 101 sets played, averaging 3.51 kills per set, had 255 digs and 49 blocks. She was named a finalist for the NCAA Woman of the Year.

=== Professional clubs ===
- (France) Béziers Volley (2022–2023)
- (Italy) Chieri (2023–2025)
- (Italy) Scandicci (2025–)

Skinner signed her first professional volleyball contract with Béziers Volley in June 2022 and played for the team in the 2022–2023 season. She has played for the Italian Serie A1 team Chieri since 2023.

Savino Del Bene Volley announced the signing of Skinner for the 2025–2026 professional season.

== Awards and honors ==
=== Clubs ===
- 2025 FIVB Club World Championship – Gold medal, with Savino del Bene Scandicci
- 2025 FIVB Club World Championship – Best Outside Hitter

=== College ===
The following are the awards Skinner won during her collegiate career:

- 2021 All-Big 12 First Team (unanimous)
- 2021 AVCA All-America – Honorable Mention
- 2020 AVCA All-America First Team
- 2020 All-SEC First Team
- 2017 All-SEC Freshman Team

=== International ===
- 2023 French Volleyball Cup – "Most Valuable Player"
- 2022 Pan American Cup – "Best Outside Hitter"
- 2022 Pan American Cup – "Best Scorer"
