= Arthur Szwarc =

Canadian volleyball player (born 1995)

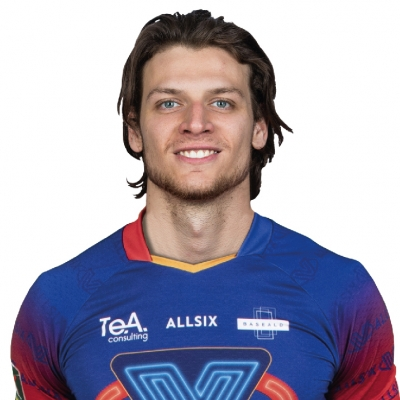
- Szwarc in 2022

Personal information
- Full name: Arthur Damian Szwarc
- Born: 30 March 1995 (age 31); Toronto, Ontario, Canada
- Hometown: Toronto, Ontario, Canada
- Height: 2.08 m (6 ft 10 in)
- Weight: 97 kg (214 lb)
- Spike: 356 cm (140 in)
- Block: 335 cm (132 in)
- Education: York University

Volleyball information
- Position: Middle blocker / Opposite
- Current club: AZS Olsztyn
- Number: 31

Career
Years	Teams
2013–2016; 2017–2019; 2019–2022; 2022–2025; 2025–	York Lions; Arago de Sète; Top Volley Cisterna; Vero Volley Monza; AZS Olsztyn

National team
2017–	Canada
Honours
Men's volleyball
Representing Canada
FIVB World League
Bronze medal – third place	2017 Curitiba
NORCECA Championship
Silver medal – second place	2023 Charleston
Bronze medal – third place	2019 Winnipeg

Arthur Damian Szwarc (born 30 March 1995) is a Canadian professional volleyball player who plays for Indykpol AZS Olsztyn and the Canada national team. He took part in the Olympic Games Tokyo 2020.

== Personal life ==
Szwarc is of Polish descent.

== Honours ==
=== Club ===
- CEV Challenge Cup
  - 2023–24 – with Vero Volley Monza

=== Individual awards ===
- 2023: NORCECA Championship – Best opposite spiker
