= Christian Thondike Mejías =

Cuban volleyball player (born 2001)

Personal information
- Full name: Christian Thondike Mejías
- Nationality: Cuban
- Born: 28 May 2001 (age 25)
- Height: 195 cm (6 ft 5 in)
- Weight: 76 kg (168 lb)
- Spike: 340 cm (134 in)
- Block: 336 cm (132 in)

Volleyball information
- Position: Setter
- Current club: (Turkey) Afyon Belediyespor

Career
| Years | Teams |
|---|---|
| 2018–2020 | (Cuba) La Habana |
| 2020–2021 | (Ukraine) Barkom-Kazhany |
| 2021–present | (Turkey) Afyon Belediyespor |

National team
| 2017–2021 | Youth Cuba Team |
| 2022– | Cuba |

Christian Manuel Thondike Mejías (born 28 May 2001) is a Cuban male volleyball player. He is part of the Cuba men's national volleyball team. On club level he plays for Afyon Belediyespor of Turkish Men's Volleyball League.

== Career ==
His career started in La Habana in Cuba.

In September 2020, Mejías signed with Barkom-Kazhany of the Ukrainian Super League.
