= Victorina Himeji =

Japanese volleyball club

Victorina Himeji ヴィクトリーナ姫路
- Short name: Himeji
- Nickname: Victorina
- Founded: March 14, 2016
- Ground: Himeji, Hyogo Prefecture, Japan
- Executive Adviser Head coach: (Japan) Yoshie Takeshita (Netherlands) Avital Selinger
- Captain: Chihiro Sasaki
- League: SV.League
- 2025-26: 5th
- Website: (in Japanese) Club home page

Uniforms
Home	Away

Victorina Himeji (ヴィクトリーナ姫路) is a women's volleyball team based in Himeji, Japan. The owner of the team is Masayoshi Manabe, former head coach of the Japan women's national volleyball team. The club was founded in 2016.

Himeji entered the V.League in 2018 playing in V.League Division 2 and won the 2018–2019 season Championship which automatically promoted them to Japan's top level V.League Division 1.

== History ==
The team registered with the Japan Volleyball association in March 2016. Three months later Yoshie Takeshita was announced as head coach. In November 2016 Masayoshi Manabe, who was born in Himeji, was appointed general manager.

In July 2017, Himeji announced it would transfer the franchise of bankrupt club Sendai Belle Fille to Himeji Victorina, with a requirement that it take 8 of the players from Sendai Belle Fille and reach contract agreements with them. If successful it would be the first time in Japan that one club team had transferred to another. The team's goal was to enter the V.Challenge League II for the 2017–2018 season. By August 3 Himeji had reached an agreement with only two Sendai players. On August 10 the V.League announced Himeji had been unable to sign a sufficient number of Sendai players and would not be allowed to participate in the V.Challenge League II 2017–18 season.

In March 2018 the Japanese V.League announced Himeji Victorina will play the 2018–2019 season in the newly organized V.League Division 2

On March 17, 2019, Himeji Victorina defeated JA Gifu Rioreina in straight sets to claim the title of Women's V.League Division 2 Champions. As 2018-2019 V2 Champions they are automatically promoted to play the 2019–2020 season in V.League Division 1.

Masayoshi Manabe is currently the team owner and Kiyoshi Abo is the team's general manager.

== Honors ==
V.League Division 2

- Champions (1): 2018–2019
- Runners-up ():

Emperor's Cup and Empress' Cup All Japan Volleyball Championship

- Champions (1): 2024

== League results ==
League		Position	Teams	Matches	Win	Lose
V.League Division 2	2018-19	Champions	8	18	17	1
V.League Division 1	2019-20	12th	12	21	3	18
V.League Division 1	2020-21	10th	12	21	4	17
V.League Division 1	2021-22	11th	12	33	8	25
SV.League	2024-25	6th	14	44	27	17
SV.League	2025-26	5th	14	44	28	16

== Current squad ==
2026/27 Squad as of November 2026

- Head coach: (Netherlands) Avital Selinger

No.	Name	Position	Date of birth	Height (m)
2	(Japan) Miki Sakurai	Setter	1 May 1996 (age 30)	1.70 m (5 ft 7 in)
3	(Japan) Saki Tanaka	Outside Hitter	21 September 1996 (age 30)	1.70 m (5 ft 7 in)
4	(Japan) Chihiro Sasaki (C)	Middle Blocker	17 November 1997 (age 29)	1.75 m (5 ft 9 in)
5	(Japan) Mao Ito	Middle Blocker	23 June 2000 (age 26)	1.78 m (5 ft 10 in)
6	(Japan) Fuka Inoue	Libero	11 April 2000 (age 26)	1.58 m (5 ft 2 in)
7	(Bulgaria) Mira Todorova	Middle Blocker	12 April 1994 (age 32)	1.88 m (6 ft 2 in)
8	(Japan) Kyoka Oshima	Setter	2 February 1998 (age 28)	1.75 m (5 ft 9 in)
9	(Japan) Kokomi Kawamata	Opposite Hitter	19 September 2006 (age 20)	1.83 m (6 ft 0 in)
11	(Japan) Nanami Asano	Middle Blocker	13 December 2002 (age 23)	1.83 m (6 ft 0 in)
12	(Japan) Rui Nonaka	Outside Hitter	3 August 2001 (age 25)	1.76 m (5 ft 9 in)
13	(Japan) Satomi Fukudome	Libero	23 November 1997 (age 28)	1.62 m (5 ft 4 in)
14	(Japan) Tomona Nozue	Outside Hitter	16 December 2002 (age 23)	1.76 m (5 ft 9 in)
15	(Japan) Yuna Yamamoto	Middle Blocker	17 February 2003 (age 23)	1.73 m (5 ft 8 in)
16	(Japan) Mizuki Ninomiya	Setter	7 May 2003 (age 23)	1.70 m (5 ft 7 in)
17	(Sweden) Anna Haak	Outside Hitter	19 September 1996 (age 30)	1.80 m (5 ft 11 in)
18	(Italy) Camilla Mingardi	Opposite Hitter	19 October 1997 (age 29)	1.86 m (6 ft 1 in)
19	(Japan) Miyu Kikuta	Outside Hitter	7 April 2003 (age 23)	1.70 m (5 ft 7 in)

== Former players ==
Domestic Players Japan

- Mihoko Tsutsui (2018–2019)
- Yuki Kawai (2018–2019)
- Sakie Takahashi (高橋咲妃恵) (2018–2020)
- Kyoko Katashita (2018–2020)
- Rie Takaki (2018–2020)
- Yuko Asazu (2018–2020)
- Haruka Kojima (2019–2020) Transferred to staff
- Yuka Kanasugi (2018–2021)
- Yurika Mizoguchi (2018–2021) Transferred to Prestige International

Foreign Players Brazil

- Suelle Oliveira (2018–2019)
- Ivna Colombo (2019–2020)
- Ana Luiza Rüdiger (2024–2025)

Bulgaria

- Mira Todorova (2025-)

Italy

- Camilla Mingardi (2025-)

South Korea

- Lee Jae-yeong (2025-2026)

Moldova

- Aliona Martiniuc (2020–2021)

Netherlands

- Celeste Plak (2021–2023)

Serbia

- Minja Osmajić (2024–2025)

Thailand

- Chatchu-on Moksri (2023-)
