= Hiram Bravo Moreno =

Mexican volleyball player (born 1999)

Personal information
- Full name: Hiram Said Bravo Moreno
- Born: 19 December 1999 (age 26); Mexico City, Mexico
- Height: 1.73 m (5 ft 8 in)
- Weight: 75 kg (165 lb)
- Spike: 234 cm (7 ft 8 in)
- Block: 226 cm (7 ft 5 in)

Volleyball information
- Position: Libero
- Current club: Mezcaleros

Career
| Years | Teams |
|---|---|
| 2021–2022; 2022– | Tigres UANL Volley; Mezcaleros |

National team
| 2022– | Mexico |
Honours
Men's volleyball
Representing Mexico

Hiram Bravo Moreno (born 19 December 1999) is a Mexican volleyball player. He is a member of the Mexico men's national volleyball team, representing the team at the 2022 FIVB Volleyball Men's World Championship.

== Career ==
=== Club ===
Bravo Moreno plays for Mezcaleros in the Mexican Volleyball League, helping his team win the league championship in 2023.

=== National team ===
Bravo Moreno played for the Mexican national team at the 2022 FIVB Volleyball Men's World Championship. At the 2023 NORCECA Championship, Bravo Moreno was named the best libero and digger in the tournament.

== Achievements ==
=== Individual ===
- 2023: NORCECA Championship – Best libero
- 2023: NORCECA Championship – Best digger
