= Luke Herr =

Canadian volleyball player (born 1994)

Personal information
- Born: 18 July 1994 (age 32); Three Hills, Alberta, Canada
- Hometown: Winnipeg, Manitoba, Canada
- Height: 1.92 m (6 ft 4 in)
- Weight: 82 kg (181 lb)
- Spike: 325 cm (128 in)
- Block: 307 cm (121 in)
- Education: University of Manitoba

Volleyball information
- Position: Setter
- Current club: Narbonne Volley

Career
Years	Teams
2012–2017; 2017–2020; 2020–2021; 2021–2022; 2022–2024; 2024–	Manitoba Bisons; Netzhoppers; Lycurgus; WWK Volleys Herrsching; AONS Milon; Narbonne Volley

National team
2022–	Canada
Honours
Men's volleyball
Representing Canada
NORCECA Championship
Silver medal – second place	2023 Charleston
Pan American Cup
Bronze medal – third place	2022 Gatineau
- Last updated: 2024-07-29

Luke Herr (born 18 July 1994) is a Canadian volleyball player. He is a member of the Canadian national team and competed for Canada at the 2024 Summer Olympics.

== Personal life ==
Luke Herr was born in Three Hills, Alberta. He studied Kinesiology and Recreation Management at the University of Manitoba while playing for the Manitoba Bisons.

=== Individual awards ===
- 2022: Pan American Cup – Best setter
- 2023: NORCECA Championship – Best setter
