= Francisco Hervás (volleyball) =

Spanish volleyball player (born 1962)

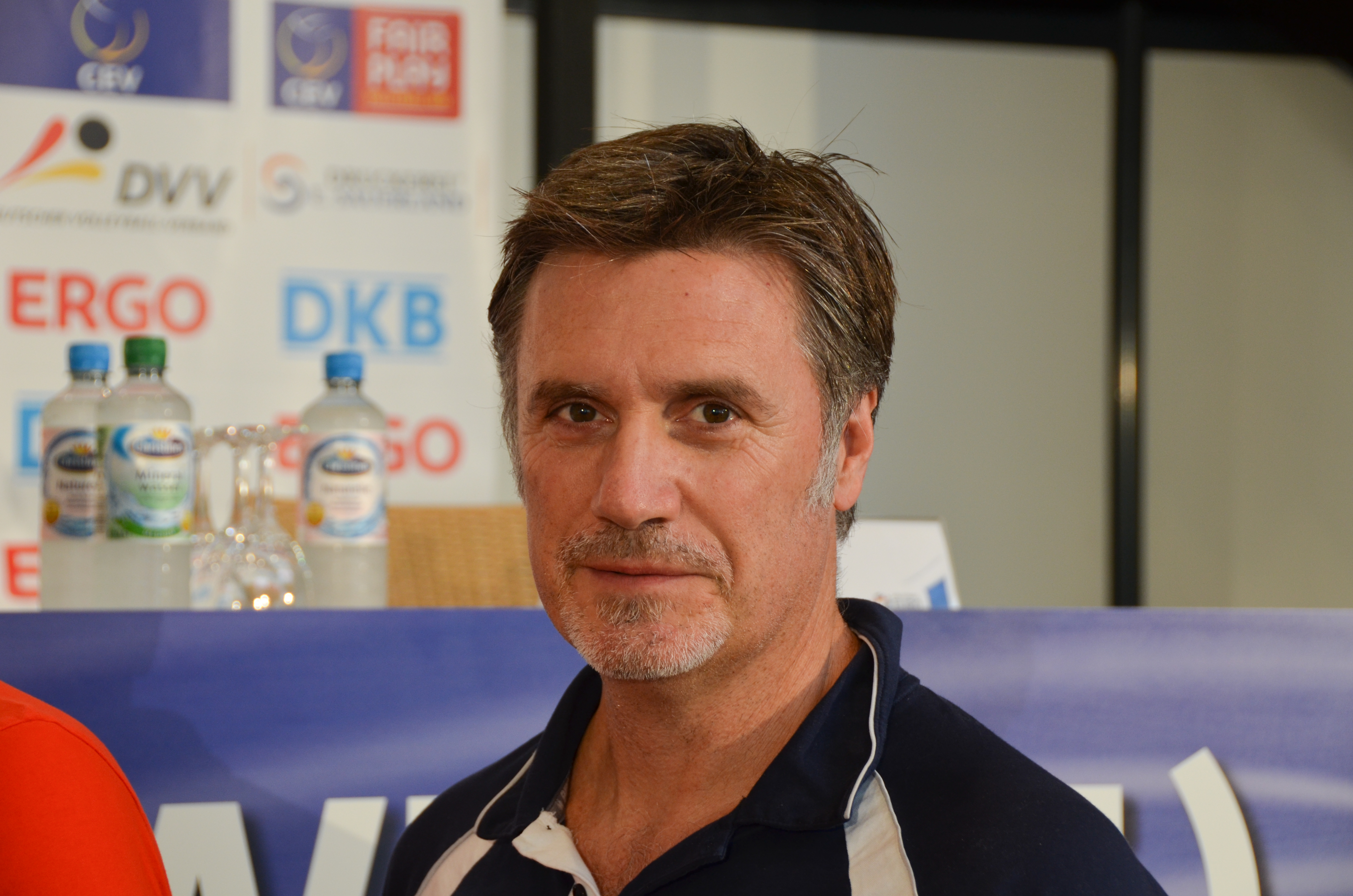
- Francisco Hervás in 2013

Personal information
- Full name: Francisco Manuel Hervás Tirada
- Nationality: Spanish
- Born: March 7, 1962 (age 64); Sevilla, Spain

Francisco Manuel Hervás Tirada (born 7 March 1962, in Sevilla) is a Spanish volleyball player who represented his native country with the men's national team at the Summer Olympics in 1992.

In August 2018, he was appointed coach of the Peru women's national volleyball team
