= 2015 Asian Women's U23 Volleyball Championship squads =

This article shows the rosters of all participating teams at the 2015 Asian Women's U23 Volleyball Championship in Pasig, Philippines.

== China ==
- Head Coach: Xu Jiande

The following is the Chinese roster in the 2015 Asian U23 Championship.

No.	Name	Date of birth	Height	Weight	Spike	Block	2015 club
1	Zhang Yu	25 September 1995	1.96 m (6 ft 5 in)	71 kg (157 lb)	320 cm (130 in)	320 cm (130 in)	(China) Beijing
2	Chen Xintong	8 April 1994	1.78 m (5 ft 10 in)	69 kg (152 lb)	297 cm (117 in)	270 cm (110 in)	(China) Beijing
4	Xu Jiujing	13 July 1995	1.89 m (6 ft 2 in)	73 kg (161 lb)	316 cm (124 in)	305 cm (120 in)	(China) Shanghai
7	Cheng Long (C)	10 January 1995	1.85 m (6 ft 1 in)	75 kg (165 lb)	305 cm (120 in)	295 cm (116 in)	(China) Shandong
8	Song Meili	23 February 1995	1.86 m (6 ft 1 in)	75 kg (165 lb)	310 cm (120 in)	300 cm (120 in)	(China) Shandong
9	Duan Fang	26 December 1994	1.86 m (6 ft 1 in)	73 kg (161 lb)	301 cm (119 in)	296 cm (117 in)	(China) Liaoning
10	Zheng Yixin	6 May 1995	1.87 m (6 ft 2 in)	69 kg (152 lb)	305 cm (120 in)	300 cm (120 in)	(China) Fujian
11	Liu Yanhan	19 January 1993	1.88 m (6 ft 2 in)	84 kg (185 lb)	315 cm (124 in)	305 cm (120 in)	(China) Bayi
12	Wang Qi	22 September 1993	1.87 m (6 ft 2 in)	70 kg (150 lb)	305 cm (120 in)	300 cm (120 in)	(China) Bayi
14	Huang Liuyan	13 June 1994	1.78 m (5 ft 10 in)	66 kg (146 lb)	297 cm (117 in)	290 cm (110 in)	(China) Bayi
15	Gong Xiangyu	21 April 1997	1.86 m (6 ft 1 in)	72 kg (159 lb)	313 cm (123 in)	292 cm (115 in)	(China) Jiangsu
18	Wang Mengjie	14 November 1995	1.72 m (5 ft 8 in)	65 kg (143 lb)	289 cm (114 in)	280 cm (110 in)	(China) Shandong

== India ==
- Head Coach: Vaishali Phadtare

The following is Indian roster in the 2015 Asian U23 Championship.

No.	Name	Date of birth	Height	Weight	Spike	Block	2015 club
1	Neradi Bincy	25 April 1994	1.66 m (5 ft 5 in)	52 kg (115 lb)	262 cm (103 in)	247 cm (97 in)	India
2	Pandi Bhagyalakshmi	9 January 1993	1.72 m (5 ft 8 in)	65 kg (143 lb)	283 cm (111 in)	275 cm (108 in)	India
4	Ghosh Anusri	9 October 1994	1.86 m (6 ft 1 in)	76 kg (168 lb)	293 cm (115 in)	286 cm (113 in)	India
5	Muraleedharan Poornima (C)	8 March 1993	1.80 m (5 ft 11 in)	74 kg (163 lb)	303 cm (119 in)	295 cm (116 in)	India
6	Chhikara Hiteshi	10 November 1993	1.73 m (5 ft 8 in)	61 kg (134 lb)	282 cm (111 in)	275 cm (108 in)	India
7	Nishya Joseph	26 March 1992	1.80 m (5 ft 11 in)	73 kg (161 lb)	289 cm (114 in)	280 cm (110 in)	India
9	Kannasseri Smisha	21 May 1993	1.81 m (5 ft 11 in)	74 kg (163 lb)	295 cm (116 in)	290 cm (110 in)	India
10	Nirmala	29 September 1996	1.81 m (5 ft 11 in)	77 kg (170 lb)	286 cm (113 in)	279 cm (110 in)	India
11	Murali Sruthi	7 November 1994	1.75 m (5 ft 9 in)	63 kg (139 lb)	298 cm (117 in)	285 cm (112 in)	India
15	Puthiya Reshma	26 November 1993	1.73 m (5 ft 8 in)	62 kg (137 lb)	293 cm (115 in)	280 cm (110 in)	India
16	Khatun Ruksana	10 March 1994	1.67 m (5 ft 6 in)	62 kg (137 lb)	271 cm (107 in)	262 cm (103 in)	India
18	Erulath Sanisha	3 March 1995	1.77 m (5 ft 10 in)	63 kg (139 lb)	280 cm (110 in)	270 cm (110 in)	India

== Iran ==
- Head Coach: Abbas Barghi

The following is the Iranian roster in the 2015 Asian U23 Championship.

No.	Name	Date of birth	Height	Weight	Spike	Block	2015 club
3	Samaneh Siavoshi	4 July 1993	1.76 m (5 ft 9 in)	74 kg (163 lb)	263 cm (104 in)	253 cm (100 in)	(Iran) Zobahan
5	Neda Chamlanian	7 March 1994	1.82 m (6 ft 0 in)	72 kg (159 lb)	275 cm (108 in)	265 cm (104 in)	(Iran) Gaz
6	Tahmineh Dargazani	26 March 1996	1.90 m (6 ft 3 in)	71 kg (157 lb)	286 cm (113 in)	276 cm (109 in)	(Iran) Gaz
8	Mahsa Saberi (C)	14 February 1993	1.78 m (5 ft 10 in)	74 kg (163 lb)	280 cm (110 in)	270 cm (110 in)	(Iran) Gaz
9	Mina Roosta	21 March 1993	1.78 m (5 ft 10 in)	68 kg (150 lb)	278 cm (109 in)	268 cm (106 in)	(Iran) Mizan
11	Fatemeh Hassani	11 December 1994	1.80 m (5 ft 11 in)	67 kg (148 lb)	271 cm (107 in)	261 cm (103 in)	(Iran) Kerman
12	Haleh Motaghiyan	6 November 1997	1.70 m (5 ft 7 in)	56 kg (123 lb)	251 cm (99 in)	241 cm (95 in)	(Iran) Zobahan
13	Negin Shirtari	3 March 1998	1.85 m (6 ft 1 in)	81 kg (179 lb)	270 cm (110 in)	260 cm (100 in)	(Iran) Mizan
14	Zoya Khaleghi	25 May 1993	1.80 m (5 ft 11 in)	74 kg (163 lb)	279 cm (110 in)	269 cm (106 in)	(Iran) Uromiye
16	Mona Derismahmoudi	21 April 1993	1.82 m (6 ft 0 in)	92 kg (203 lb)	277 cm (109 in)	267 cm (105 in)	(Iran) Zobahan
17	Maryam Khalili	20 February 1995	1.75 m (5 ft 9 in)	58 kg (128 lb)	271 cm (107 in)	261 cm (103 in)	(Iran) Uromiye
19	Mahsa Kadkhoda	22 June 1993	1.82 m (6 ft 0 in)	72 kg (159 lb)	275 cm (108 in)	265 cm (104 in)	(Iran) Mizan

== Japan ==
- Head Coach: Kiyoshi Abo

The following is the Japanese roster in the 2015 Asian U23 Championship.

No.	Name	Date of birth	Height	Weight	Spike	Block	2015 club
1	Nao Muranaga (C)	26 December 1993	1.77 m (5 ft 10 in)	66 kg (146 lb)	302 cm (119 in)	292 cm (115 in)	(Japan) Kobe Shinwa University
2	Yuka Imamura	2 September 1993	1.76 m (5 ft 9 in)	69 kg (152 lb)	297 cm (117 in)	291 cm (115 in)	(Japan) Hisamitsu Springs
3	Mika Shibata	7 June 1994	1.70 m (5 ft 7 in)	64 kg (141 lb)	275 cm (108 in)	270 cm (110 in)	(Japan) Nippon Sport Science University
4	Manami Kojima	7 November 1994	1.58 m (5 ft 2 in)	58 kg (128 lb)	260 cm (100 in)	250 cm (98 in)	(Japan) Aoyama Gakuin University
5	Misaki Yamauchi	10 March 1995	1.72 m (5 ft 8 in)	69 kg (152 lb)	306 cm (120 in)	295 cm (116 in)	(Japan) Tokai University
6	Arisa Inoue	8 May 1995	1.80 m (5 ft 11 in)	67 kg (148 lb)	300 cm (120 in)	289 cm (114 in)	(Japan) University of Tsukuba
7	Minami Higane	2 July 1995	1.69 m (5 ft 7 in)	60 kg (130 lb)	284 cm (112 in)	264 cm (104 in)	(Japan) Aoyama Gakuin University
10	Mami Miura	21 July 1993	1.82 m (6 ft 0 in)	70 kg (150 lb)	296 cm (117 in)	286 cm (113 in)	(Japan) Ageo Medics
11	Miku Namba	6 December 1994	1.78 m (5 ft 10 in)	72 kg (159 lb)	295 cm (116 in)	285 cm (112 in)	(Japan) Hisamitsu Springs
16	Nanaka Sakamoto	6 September 1996	1.76 m (5 ft 9 in)	65 kg (143 lb)	304 cm (120 in)	294 cm (116 in)	(Japan) Denso Airybees
17	Kaori Mabashi	18 November 1996	1.73 m (5 ft 8 in)	63 kg (139 lb)	296 cm (117 in)	286 cm (113 in)	(Japan) Hitachi Rivale
18	Hitomi Kodama	26 September 1996	1.79 m (5 ft 10 in)	67 kg (148 lb)	287 cm (113 in)	280 cm (110 in)	(Japan) Hisamitsu Springs

== Kazakhstan ==
- Head Coach: Lyudmila Perevertova

The following is the Kazakhstani roster in the 2015 Asian U23 Championship.

No.	Name	Date of birth	Height	Weight	Spike	Block	2015 club
2	Valeriya Markovskaya	3 November 1997	1.65 m (5 ft 5 in)	58 kg (128 lb)	262 cm (103 in)	247 cm (97 in)	(Kazakhstan) Irtysh-Kazchrome
3	Zarina Sitkazinova	20 March 1993	1.82 m (6 ft 0 in)	70 kg (150 lb)	295 cm (116 in)	280 cm (110 in)	(Kazakhstan) Astana
4	Irina Chumak	26 January 1994	1.85 m (6 ft 1 in)	67 kg (148 lb)	280 cm (110 in)	266 cm (105 in)	(Kazakhstan) Almaty
6	Natalya Akilova (C)	31 May 1993	1.83 m (6 ft 0 in)	62 kg (137 lb)	295 cm (116 in)	275 cm (108 in)	(Kazakhstan) Karaganda
7	Yekaterina Razorenkova	3 June 1993	1.85 m (6 ft 1 in)	69 kg (152 lb)	283 cm (111 in)	280 cm (110 in)	(Kazakhstan) Almaty
8	Yekaterina Sakharova	1 December 1995	1.81 m (5 ft 11 in)	68 kg (150 lb)	290 cm (110 in)	285 cm (112 in)	(Kazakhstan) Shygys
11	Anastassiya Rostovchshikova	17 April 1994	1.80 m (5 ft 11 in)	64 kg (141 lb)	280 cm (110 in)	260 cm (100 in)	(Kazakhstan) Kostanay
12	Ainagul Aizharikhova	4 September 1994	1.87 m (6 ft 2 in)	64 kg (141 lb)	286 cm (113 in)	280 cm (110 in)	(Kazakhstan) Astana
13	Yana Yagodina	24 January 1993	1.81 m (5 ft 11 in)	67 kg (148 lb)	286 cm (113 in)	283 cm (111 in)	(Kazakhstan) Almaty
15	Aliya Batkuldina	18 November 1995	1.80 m (5 ft 11 in)	69 kg (152 lb)	273 cm (107 in)	264 cm (104 in)	(Kazakhstan) Astana
17	Ardak Maratova	3 June 1994	1.82 m (6 ft 0 in)	76 kg (168 lb)	275 cm (108 in)	265 cm (104 in)	(Kazakhstan) Almaty
19	Diana Bortnokova	9 May 1995	1.79 m (5 ft 10 in)	61 kg (134 lb)	280 cm (110 in)	277 cm (109 in)	(Kazakhstan) Shygys

== South Korea ==
- Head Coach: Hong Sung-jin

The following is the Korean roster in the 2015 Asian U23 Championship.

No.	Name	Date of birth	Height	Weight	Spike	Block	2015 club
1	Lee So-young	17 October 1994	1.76 m (5 ft 9 in)	69 kg (152 lb)	280 cm (110 in)	265 cm (104 in)	(South Korea) GS Caltex
2	Go Ye-rim	12 June 1994	1.77 m (5 ft 10 in)	63 kg (139 lb)	278 cm (109 in)	260 cm (100 in)	(South Korea) Korea Corporation
3	Ha Hye-jin	7 September 1996	1.81 m (5 ft 11 in)	60 kg (130 lb)	290 cm (110 in)	275 cm (108 in)	(South Korea) Korea Corporation
4	An Hye-ri	20 May 1994	1.73 m (5 ft 8 in)	62 kg (137 lb)	275 cm (108 in)	250 cm (98 in)	(South Korea) GS Caltex
6	Noh Ran	17 March 1994	1.67 m (5 ft 6 in)	59 kg (130 lb)	260 cm (100 in)	245 cm (96 in)	(South Korea) IBK
8	Kim Yeong-yeon	1 December 1993	1.63 m (5 ft 4 in)	54 kg (119 lb)	257 cm (101 in)	240 cm (94 in)	(South Korea) Hyundai Construction
9	Kim Ha-kyung	15 November 1996	1.74 m (5 ft 9 in)	65 kg (143 lb)	273 cm (107 in)	269 cm (106 in)	(South Korea) IBK
12	Gong Yun-hui	12 March 1995	1.79 m (5 ft 10 in)	65 kg (143 lb)	287 cm (113 in)	278 cm (109 in)	(South Korea) Heungkuk Life
13	Moon Myoung-hwa	4 September 1995	1.90 m (6 ft 3 in)	73 kg (161 lb)	295 cm (116 in)	282 cm (111 in)	(South Korea) KGC Jinseng
14	Cho Song-hwa (C)	12 March 1995	1.77 m (5 ft 10 in)	66 kg (146 lb)	275 cm (108 in)	265 cm (104 in)	(South Korea) Heungkuk Life
17	Kim Mi-youn	5 March 1993	1.77 m (5 ft 10 in)	65 kg (143 lb)	275 cm (108 in)	266 cm (105 in)	(South Korea) Korea Corporation
18	Jeong Da-woun	18 March 1995	1.83 m (6 ft 0 in)	70 kg (150 lb)	286 cm (113 in)	275 cm (108 in)	(South Korea) GS Caltex

== Philippines ==
- Head Coach: Rogelio Gorayeb

The following is the Filipino roster in the 2015 Asian U23 Championship.

No.	Name	Date of birth	Height	Weight	Spike	Block	2015 club
1	Christine Agno	15 October 1993	1.56 m (5 ft 1 in)	64 kg (141 lb)	244 cm (96 in)	239 cm (94 in)	(Philippines) FEU Lady Tamaraws
2	Alyssa Valdez (C)	29 June 1993	1.75 m (5 ft 9 in)	60 kg (130 lb)	290 cm (110 in)	282 cm (111 in)	(Philippines) Ateneo Lady Blue Spikers
3	Jaja Santiago	20 January 1996	1.96 m (6 ft 5 in)	67 kg (148 lb)	296 cm (117 in)	287 cm (113 in)	(Philippines) NU Lady Bulldogs
5	Grethcel Soltones	5 September 1995	1.73 m (5 ft 8 in)	64 kg (141 lb)	298 cm (117 in)	283 cm (111 in)	(Philippines) San Sebastian Stags
6	Risa Sato	4 October 1994	1.78 m (5 ft 10 in)	65 kg (143 lb)	275 cm (108 in)	269 cm (106 in)	(Philippines) Ateneo Lady Blue Spikers
8	Jorella Marie De Jesus	17 August 1993	1.54 m (5 ft 1 in)	64 kg (141 lb)	275 cm (108 in)	266 cm (105 in)	(Philippines) Ateneo Lady Blue Spikers
9	Ennajie Laure	31 July 1997	1.75 m (5 ft 9 in)	65 kg (143 lb)	283 cm (111 in)	275 cm (108 in)	(Philippines) UST Golden Tigresses
12	Julia Melissa Morado	10 May 1995	1.68 m (5 ft 6 in)	61 kg (134 lb)	244 cm (96 in)	239 cm (94 in)	(Philippines) Ateneo Lady Blue Spikers
14	Isabel Beatriz De Leon	2 August 1996	1.79 m (5 ft 10 in)	62 kg (137 lb)	278 cm (109 in)	269 cm (106 in)	(Philippines) Ateneo Lady Blue Spikers
15	Jhoana Louisse Maraguinot	25 January 1996	1.71 m (5 ft 7 in)	65 kg (143 lb)	278 cm (109 in)	272 cm (107 in)	(Philippines) Ateneo Lady Blue Spikers
17	Myla Pablo	12 September 1994	1.73 m (5 ft 8 in)	63 kg (139 lb)	275 cm (108 in)	266 cm (105 in)	(Philippines) NU Lady Bulldogs
18	Marivic Velaine Meneses	18 October 1995	1.85 m (6 ft 1 in)	64 kg (141 lb)	275 cm (108 in)	269 cm (106 in)	(Philippines) UST Golden Tigresses

== Chinese Taipei ==
- Head Coach: Lin Ming-hui

The following is the Taiwanese roster in the 2015 Asian U23 Championship.

No.	Name	Date of birth	Height	Weight	Spike	Block	2015 club
1	Lai Xiang-chen	19 March 1995	1.52 m (5 ft 0 in)	50 kg (110 lb)	252 cm (99 in)	245 cm (96 in)	Chinese Taipei
2	Chang Li-wen	27 February 1994	1.75 m (5 ft 9 in)	57 kg (126 lb)	285 cm (112 in)	275 cm (108 in)	Chinese Taipei
3	Wang Jing-ting	5 July 1994	1.61 m (5 ft 3 in)	58 kg (128 lb)	268 cm (106 in)	265 cm (104 in)	Chinese Taipei
4	Huang Chen-yu	25 February 1998	1.78 m (5 ft 10 in)	58 kg (128 lb)	295 cm (116 in)	287 cm (113 in)	Chinese Taipei
6	Lee Wan-jung	23 June 1995	1.62 m (5 ft 4 in)	60 kg (130 lb)	268 cm (106 in)	265 cm (104 in)	Chinese Taipei
10	Wu Wei-hua	5 February 1994	1.73 m (5 ft 8 in)	73 kg (161 lb)	278 cm (109 in)	267 cm (105 in)	Chinese Taipei
14	Chien Huang-ying	10 September 1994	1.86 m (6 ft 1 in)	83 kg (183 lb)	289 cm (114 in)	279 cm (110 in)	Chinese Taipei
15	Lee Tzu-ying	4 July 1994	1.74 m (5 ft 9 in)	71 kg (157 lb)	274 cm (108 in)	265 cm (104 in)	Chinese Taipei
16	Chen Tzu-ya	26 August 1997	1.78 m (5 ft 10 in)	61 kg (134 lb)	272 cm (107 in)	270 cm (110 in)	Chinese Taipei
17	Hung Ching-chun	8 August 1996	1.76 m (5 ft 9 in)	56 kg (123 lb)	273 cm (107 in)	271 cm (107 in)	Chinese Taipei
18	Wu Ching-ting (C)	14 February 1993	1.70 m (5 ft 7 in)	60 kg (130 lb)	275 cm (108 in)	263 cm (104 in)	Chinese Taipei
19	Tseng Wan-ling	13 May 1996	1.70 m (5 ft 7 in)	66 kg (146 lb)	290 cm (110 in)	277 cm (109 in)	Chinese Taipei

== Thailand ==
- Head Coach: Nataphon Srisamutnak

The following is the Thai roster in the 2015 Asian U23 Championship.

No.	Name	Date of birth	Height	Weight	Spike	Block	2015 club
1	Anisa Yotpinit	23 June 1998	1.64 m (5 ft 5 in)	64 kg (141 lb)	245 cm (96 in)	265 cm (104 in)	(Thailand) Sisaket
3	Wipawee Srithong	28 January 1999	1.73 m (5 ft 8 in)	63 kg (139 lb)	288 cm (113 in)	267 cm (105 in)	(Thailand) Supreme Chonburi
7	Hattaya Bamrungsuk	12 August 1993	1.80 m (5 ft 11 in)	70 kg (150 lb)	300 cm (120 in)	289 cm (114 in)	(Thailand) Nakhon Ratchasima
8	Pimpichaya Kokram	16 June 1998	1.76 m (5 ft 9 in)	57 kg (126 lb)	300 cm (120 in)	281 cm (111 in)	(Thailand) 3BB Nakornnont
9	Chatchu-on Moksri	6 November 1999	1.77 m (5 ft 10 in)	63 kg (139 lb)	298 cm (117 in)	295 cm (116 in)	(Thailand) Ayutthaya A.T.C.C
11	Pornpun Guedpard (C)	5 May 1993	1.72 m (5 ft 8 in)	63 kg (139 lb)	310 cm (120 in)	287 cm (113 in)	(Thailand) Bangkok Glass
12	Sineenat Phocharoen	19 May 1995	1.74 m (5 ft 9 in)	53 kg (117 lb)	287 cm (113 in)	270 cm (110 in)	(Thailand) Sisaket
14	Parinya Pankaew	27 December 1995	1.70 m (5 ft 7 in)	59 kg (130 lb)	281 cm (111 in)	271 cm (107 in)	(Thailand) Supreme Chonburi
15	Kaewkalaya Kamulthala	7 August 1994	1.78 m (5 ft 10 in)	66 kg (146 lb)	298 cm (117 in)	281 cm (111 in)	(Thailand) Idea Khonkaen
16	Jarasporn Bundasak	1 March 1993	1.80 m (5 ft 11 in)	66 kg (146 lb)	292 cm (115 in)	282 cm (111 in)	(Thailand) Bangkok Glass
17	Tichaya Boonlert	14 February 1997	1.78 m (5 ft 10 in)	64 kg (141 lb)	291 cm (115 in)	283 cm (111 in)	(Thailand) 3BB Nakornnont
18	Ajcharaporn Kongyot	18 June 1995	1.80 m (5 ft 11 in)	66 kg (146 lb)	296 cm (117 in)	285 cm (112 in)	(Thailand) Supreme Chonburi
