= 2017 Asian Women's Volleyball Championship squads =

This article shows all participating team squads at the 2017 Asian Women's Volleyball Championship, held in the Philippines from 9 to 17 August 2017.

== Pool A ==
=== Philippines ===
The following is the Filipino roster in the 2017 Asian Championship.

Head Coach: Francis Vicente

No.	Name	Date of birth	Height	Weight	Spike	Block	2016–17 club
1	Rhea Dimaculangan	21 March 1991	1.70 m (5 ft 7 in)	66 kg (146 lb)	266 cm (105 in)	256 cm (101 in)	(Philippines) Petron Blaze Spikers
2	Alyssa Valdez	29 June 1993	1.75 m (5 ft 9 in)	60 kg (130 lb)	283 cm (111 in)	279 cm (110 in)	(Philippines) Creamline Cool Smashers (Thailand) 3BB Nakornnont
3	Jaja Santiago	20 January 1996	1.96 m (6 ft 5 in)	65 kg (143 lb)	280 cm (110 in)	277 cm (109 in)	(Philippines) Foton Tornadoes
5	Mika Reyes (c)	21 June 1994	1.83 m (6 ft 0 in)	61 kg (134 lb)	283 cm (111 in)	279 cm (110 in)	(Philippines) Petron Blaze Spikers
6	Jovelyn Gonzaga	31 October 1991	1.72 m (5 ft 7 1/2 in)	61 kg (134 lb)	273 cm (107 in)	274 cm (108 in)	(Philippines) Cignal HD Spikers
7	Frances Molina	24 September 1994	1.80 m (5 ft 11 in)	61 kg (134 lb)	280 cm (110 in)	275 cm (108 in)	(Philippines) Petron Blaze Spikers
8	Aiza Maizo-Pontillas	29 February 1988	1.78 m (5 ft 10 in)	68 kg (150 lb)	280 cm (110 in)	275 cm (108 in)	(Philippines) Petron Blaze Spikers
9	Kim Fajardo	30 September 1993	1.70 m (5 ft 7 in)	59 kg (130 lb)	275 cm (108 in)	265 cm (104 in)	(Philippines) F2 Logistics Cargo Movers
10	Maika Ortiz	30 August 1991	1.80 m (5 ft 11 in)	70 kg (150 lb)	290 cm (110 in)	295 cm (116 in)	(Philippines) Foton Tornadoes
11	Kim Kianna Dy	26 July 1995	1.80 m (5 ft 11 in)	57 kg (126 lb)	280 cm (110 in)	270 cm (110 in)	(Philippines) F2 Logistics Cargo Movers
12	Geneveve Casugod	12 January 1994	1.85 m (6 ft 1 in)	72 kg (159 lb)	271 cm (107 in)	268 cm (106 in)	(Philippines) Generika-Ayala Lifesavers
13	Denden Lazaro	21 January 1992	1.65 m (5 ft 5 in)	56 kg (123 lb)	251 cm (99 in)	247 cm (97 in)	(Philippines) Cocolife Asset Managers
15	Dawn Macandili	31 May 1996	1.53 m (5 ft 0 in)	50 kg (110 lb)	246 cm (97 in)	234 cm (92 in)	(Philippines) F2 Logistics Cargo Movers
16	Aby Maraño	22 December 1992	1.75 m (5 ft 9 in)	54 kg (119 lb)	280 cm (110 in)	270 cm (110 in)	(Philippines) F2 Logistics Cargo Movers

=== Kazakhstan ===
The following is the Kazakhstani roster in the 2017 Asian Championship.

Head Coach: Shapran Vyacheslav

No.	Name	Date of birth	Height	Weight	Spike	Block	2016–17 club
4	Yekaterina Zhdanova	28 May 1992	1.83 m (6 ft 0 in)	65 kg (143 lb)	280 cm (110 in)	270 cm (110 in)	(Kazakhstan) Zhetyssu
5	Diana Kempa	30 December 1992	1.67 m (5 ft 6 in)	56 kg (123 lb)	270 cm (110 in)	275 cm (108 in)	(Kazakhstan) Pavlodar
6	Natalya Akilova	31 May 1993	1.83 m (6 ft 0 in)	62 kg (137 lb)	295 cm (116 in)	275 cm (108 in)	(Kazakhstan) Zhetyssu
8	Yana Petrenko	30 July 1990	1.81 m (5 ft 11 in)	71 kg (157 lb)	297 cm (117 in)	265 cm (104 in)	(Kazakhstan) Almaty
10	Irina Shenberger	20 February 1992	1.80 m (5 ft 11 in)	73 kg (161 lb)	290 cm (110 in)	280 cm (110 in)	(Kazakhstan) Astana
11	Katerina Tatko	15 December 1992	1.82 m (6 ft 0 in)	70 kg (150 lb)	285 cm (112 in)	275 cm (108 in)	(Kazakhstan) Zhetyssu
13	Radmila Beresneva (c)	6 June 1983	1.85 m (6 ft 1 in)	70 kg (150 lb)	300 cm (120 in)	295 cm (116 in)	(Kazakhstan) Irtysh-Kazchrome
14	Antonina Rubtsova	30 December 1984	1.84 m (6 ft 0 in)	67 kg (148 lb)	302 cm (119 in)	275 cm (108 in)	(Kazakhstan) Zhetyssu
15	Aliya Batkuldina	18 November 1995	1.81 m (5 ft 11 in)	74 kg (163 lb)	273 cm (107 in)	264 cm (104 in)	(Kazakhstan) Almaty
17	Alla Bogdashkina	22 August 1985	1.85 m (6 ft 1 in)	65 kg (143 lb)	275 cm (108 in)	270 cm (110 in)	(Kazakhstan) Irtysh-Kazchrome
19	Alessya Safronova	10 February 1986	1.85 cm (1 in)	65 kg (143 lb)	300 cm (120 in)	290 cm (110 in)	(Kazakhstan) Altay

=== Hong Kong ===
The following is the Hong Kong roster in the 2017 Asian Championship.

Head coach: Lam Chun-kwok

No.	Name	Date of birth	Height	Weight	Spike	Block	2016–17 club
1	Yu Ying-chi	7 August 1992	1.69 m (5 ft 7 in)	64 kg (141 lb)	270 cm (8 ft 10 in)	265 cm (8 ft 8 in)	Hong Kong
3	Kwok Pui-yiu	20 September 1991	1.73 m (5 ft 8 in)	62 kg (137 lb)	290 cm (9 ft 6 in)	280 cm (9 ft 2 in)	Hong Kong
5	Tsang Sze-nga (c)	7 May 1987	1.74 m (5 ft 9 in)	59 kg (130 lb)	254 cm (8 ft 4 in)	246 cm (8 ft 1 in)	Hong Kong
6	Chim Wing-lam	8 November 1997	1.73 m (5 ft 8 in)	63 kg (139 lb)	287 cm (9 ft 5 in)	280 cm (9 ft 2 in)	Hong Kong
7	Yeung Sau-mei	30 August 1985	1.83 m (6 ft 0 in)	67 kg (148 lb)	285 cm (9 ft 4 in)	280 cm (9 ft 2 in)	Hong Kong
8	Fung Wing-yan	7 March 1990	1.75 m (5 ft 9 in)	76 kg (168 lb)	280 cm (9 ft 2 in)	272 cm (8 ft 11 in)	Hong Kong
9	To Wing-man	14 September 1993	1.78 m (5 ft 10 in)	55 kg (121 lb)	288 cm (9 ft 5 in)	282 cm (9 ft 3 in)	Hong Kong
10	Cheung Man-lee	15 August 1987	1.74 m (5 ft 9 in)	56 kg (123 lb)	275 cm (9 ft 0 in)	270 cm (8 ft 10 in)	Hong Kong
12	Chan Eu-eu	1 October 1988	1.55 m (5 ft 1 in)	55 kg (121 lb)	243 cm (8 ft 0 in)	229 cm (7 ft 6 in)	Hong Kong
14	Lam Yee-ting	26 December 1990	1.68 m (5 ft 6 in)	63 kg (139 lb)	245 cm (8 ft 0 in)	240 cm (7 ft 10 in)	Hong Kong
15	Cheung Sze-wing	17 January 1992	1.73 m (5 ft 8 in)	65 kg (143 lb)	265 cm (8 ft 8 in)	256 cm (8 ft 5 in)	Hong Kong
16	Tsui Ka-yee	30 July 1986	1.65 m (5 ft 5 in)	53 kg (117 lb)	270 cm (8 ft 10 in)	260 cm (8 ft 6 in)	Hong Kong
18	Ip Hoi-lun	24 October 1990	1.77 m (5 ft 10 in)	70 kg (150 lb)	281 cm (9 ft 3 in)	268 cm (8 ft 10 in)	Hong Kong
19	Ngai Kwai-ting	23 May 1995	1.75 m (5 ft 9 in)	69 kg (152 lb)	282 cm (9 ft 3 in)	270 cm (8 ft 10 in)	Hong Kong

== Pool B ==
=== China ===
The following is the Chinese roster in the 2017 Asian Championship.

Head coach: Bao Zhuang

No.	Name	Date of birth	Height	Weight	Spike	Block	2016–17 club
2	Liu Mengya (c)	2 December 1988	1.85 m (6 ft 1 in)	75 kg (165 lb)	305 cm (10 ft 0 in)	295 cm (9 ft 8 in)	(China) Yunnan
3	Chen Peiyan	16 September 1999	1.94 m (6 ft 4 in)	80 kg (180 lb)	302 cm (9 ft 11 in)	290 cm (9 ft 6 in)	(China) Guangdong
5	Guan Ruige	25 October 1998	1.88 m (6 ft 2 in)	71 kg (157 lb)	311 cm (10 ft 2 in)	303 cm (9 ft 11 in)	(China) Beijing
6	Cai Xiaoqing	5 April 1998	1.68 m (5 ft 6 in)	60 kg (130 lb)	295 cm (9 ft 8 in)	285 cm (9 ft 4 in)	(China) Henan
7	Huang Ruilei	8 May 1996	1.91 m (6 ft 3 in)	75 kg (165 lb)	304 cm (10 ft 0 in)	295 cm (9 ft 8 in)	(China) Henan
9	Jin Ye	1 March 1996	1.87 m (6 ft 2 in)	75 kg (165 lb)	309 cm (10 ft 2 in)	300 cm (9 ft 10 in)	(China) Beijing
12	Liang Guiqian	2 October 1997	1.74 m (5 ft 9 in)	62 kg (137 lb)	295 cm (9 ft 8 in)	285 cm (9 ft 4 in)	(China) Fujian
13	Wang Simin	13 December 1997	1.70 m (5 ft 7 in)	60 kg (130 lb)	280 cm (9 ft 2 in)	270 cm (8 ft 10 in)	(China) Beijing
14	Huang Feng	29 October 1998	1.86 m (6 ft 1 in)	69 kg (152 lb)	298 cm (9 ft 9 in)	296 cm (9 ft 9 in)	(China) Fujian
16	Shu Zhijia	10 December 1996	1.73 m (5 ft 8 in)	60 kg (130 lb)	275 cm (9 ft 0 in)	266 cm (8 ft 9 in)	(China) Yunnan
17	Yu Jiarui	23 October 1997	1.85 m (6 ft 1 in)	70 kg (150 lb)	300 cm (9 ft 10 in)	290 cm (9 ft 6 in)	(China) Guangdong
18	Wang Zichen	13 June 1999	1.83 m (6 ft 0 in)	66 kg (146 lb)	295 cm (9 ft 8 in)	285 cm (9 ft 4 in)	(China) Henan
19	Lei Yanxi	20 January 1995	1.86 m (6 ft 1 in)	73 kg (161 lb)	302 cm (9 ft 11 in)	290 cm (9 ft 6 in)	(China) Yunnan

=== Japan ===
The following is the Japanese roster in the 2017 Asian Championship.

Head coach: Kumi Nakada

No.	Name	Date of birth	Height	Weight	Spike	Block	2016–17 club
1	Kotoe Inoue	15 February 1990	1.62 m (5 ft 4 in)	53 kg (117 lb)	287 cm (113 in)	275 cm (108 in)	(Japan) JT Marvelous
2	Sarina Koga	21 May 1996	1.80 m (5 ft 11 in)	66 kg (146 lb)	307 cm (121 in)	290 cm (110 in)	(Japan) NEC Red Rockets
3	Nana Iwasaka (c)	3 July 1990	1.87 m (6 ft 2 in)	76 kg (168 lb)	298 cm (117 in)	293 cm (115 in)	(Japan) Hisamitsu Springs
4	Risa Shinnabe	11 July 1990	1.73 m (5 ft 8 in)	64 kg (141 lb)	293 cm (115 in)	285 cm (112 in)	(Japan) Hisamitsu Springs
5	Erika Araki	3 August 1984	1.86 m (6 ft 1 in)	78 kg (172 lb)	305 cm (120 in)	297 cm (117 in)	(Japan) Toyota Auto Body Queenseis
8	Rika Nomoto	21 September 1991	1.80 m (5 ft 11 in)	73 kg (161 lb)	310 cm (120 in)	291 cm (115 in)	(Japan) Hisamitsu Springs
9	Haruyo Shimamura	4 March 1992	1.82 m (6 ft 0 in)	77 kg (170 lb)	305 cm (120 in)	280 cm (110 in)	(Japan) NEC Red Rockets
10	Koyomi Tominaga	1 May 1989	1.76 m (5 ft 9 in)	67 kg (148 lb)	305 cm (120 in)	280 cm (110 in)	(Japan) Ageo Medics
11	Yurie Nabeya	15 December 1993	1.76 m (5 ft 9 in)	57 kg (126 lb)	302 cm (119 in)	292 cm (115 in)	(Japan) Denso Airybees
12	Miya Sato	7 March 1990	1.74 m (5 ft 9 in)	61 kg (134 lb)	284 cm (112 in)	280 cm (110 in)	(Japan) Hitachi Rivale
13	Mai Okumura	31 October 1990	1.77 m (5 ft 10 in)	66 kg (146 lb)	297 cm (117 in)	285 cm (112 in)	(Japan) JT Marvelous
16	Risa Ishii	19 May 1990	1.79 m (5 ft 10 in)	65 kg (143 lb)	305 cm (120 in)	277 cm (109 in)	(Japan) Denso Airybees
18	Mami Uchiseto	25 October 1991	1.71 m (5 ft 7 in)	70 kg (150 lb)	296 cm (117 in)	285 cm (112 in)	(Japan) Hitachi Rivale
20	Mako Kobata	15 August 1992	1.64 m (5 ft 5 in)	55 kg (121 lb)	284 cm (112 in)	274 cm (108 in)	(Japan) JT Marvelous

=== Australia ===
The following is the Australian roster in the 2017 Asian Championship.

Head coach: Shannon Winzer

No.	Name	Date of birth	Height	Weight	Spike	Block	2016–17 club
1	Jennifer Tait	3 January 1995	1.93 m (6 ft 4 in)	80 kg (180 lb)	306 cm (10 ft 0 in)	291 cm (9 ft 7 in)	(Australia) Campbell University
3	Sophie Paine	1 September 1992	1.76 m (5 ft 9 in)	65 kg (143 lb)	287 cm (9 ft 5 in)	276 cm (9 ft 1 in)	(Australia) University Blues
4	Sophie Godfrey	2 December 1987	1.86 m (6 ft 1 in)	73 kg (161 lb)	295 cm (9 ft 8 in)	284 cm (9 ft 4 in)	(Australia) Timișoara
7	Kelly Lean	19 July 1995	1.74 m (5 ft 9 in)	70 kg (150 lb)	281 cm (9 ft 3 in)	269 cm (8 ft 10 in)	(Australia) University of Tennessee Martin
8	Hannah Martin	15 September 1990	1.83 m (6 ft 0 in)	80 kg (180 lb)	294 cm (9 ft 8 in)	289 cm (9 ft 6 in)	(Australia) University Blues
9	Jamie-Lee Marrow	16 November 1992	1.77 m (5 ft 10 in)	77 kg (170 lb)	290 cm (9 ft 6 in)	260 cm (8 ft 6 in)	(Australia) Centre of Excellence
11	Jennifer Sadler	18 March 1993	1.85 m (6 ft 1 in)	69 kg (152 lb)	302 cm (9 ft 11 in)	291 cm (9 ft 7 in)	(Australia) Centre of Excellence
12	Kathryn Chen	27 September 1990	1.65 m (5 ft 5 in)	66 kg (146 lb)	262 cm (8 ft 7 in)	255 cm (8 ft 4 in)	(Australia) Centre of Excellence
13	Beth Carey (c)	28 September 1990	1.90 m (6 ft 3 in)	78 kg (172 lb)	300 cm (9 ft 10 in)	290 cm (9 ft 6 in)	(Australia) VFB91
14	Rebecca Reeve	23 March 1994	1.81 m (5 ft 11 in)	69 kg (152 lb)	294 cm (9 ft 8 in)	283 cm (9 ft 3 in)	(Australia) Tulsa University
18	Katrina Janssen	12 March 1995	1.90 m (6 ft 3 in)	80 kg (180 lb)	300 cm (9 ft 10 in)	285 cm (9 ft 4 in)	(Australia) Caldwell University
21	Elissa Blowes	19 August 1992	1.74 m (5 ft 9 in)	73 kg (161 lb)	289 cm (9 ft 6 in)	281 cm (9 ft 3 in)	(Australia) Centre of Excellence

== Pool C ==
=== South Korea ===
The following is the Korean roster in the 2017 Asian Championship.

Head coach: Hong Sung-jin

No.	Name	Date of birth	Height	Weight	Spike	Block	2016–17 club
1	Lee Jae-eun	11 March 1987	1.76 m (5 ft 9 in)	63 kg (139 lb)	278 cm (109 in)	265 cm (104 in)	(South Korea) Daejeon KGC
2	Kim Yeon-gyeon	1 December 1993	1.62 m (5 ft 4 in)	48 kg (106 lb)	250 cm (98 in)	240 cm (94 in)	(South Korea) Suwon Hyundai
3	Yeum Hye-seon	3 February 1991	1.77 m (5 ft 10 in)	65 kg (143 lb)	278 cm (109 in)	263 cm (104 in)	(South Korea) Hwaseong IBK Altos
4	Kim Hee-jin	29 April 1991	1.85 m (6 ft 1 in)	75 kg (165 lb)	300 cm (120 in)	295 cm (116 in)	(South Korea) Hwaseong IBK Altos
8	Na Hyun-jung (L)	10 March 1990	1.63 m (5 ft 4 in)	54 kg (119 lb)	257 cm (101 in)	250 cm (98 in)	(South Korea) GS Caltex Seoul KIXX
9	Han Soo-ji	1 February 1989	1.82 m (6 ft 0 in)	78 kg (172 lb)	305 cm (120 in)	296 cm (117 in)	(South Korea) Daejeon KGC
10	Kim Yeon-koung (c)	26 February 1988	1.92 m (6 ft 4 in)	73 kg (161 lb)	310 cm (120 in)	300 cm (120 in)	(Turkey) Fenerbahçe
11	Kim Su-ji	11 July 1987	1.86 m (6 ft 1 in)	68 kg (150 lb)	303 cm (119 in)	294 cm (116 in)	(South Korea) Hwaseong IBK Altos
13	Park Jeong-ah	26 March 1993	1.87 m (6 ft 2 in)	73 kg (161 lb)	300 cm (120 in)	290 cm (110 in)	(South Korea) Daejeon KGC
14	Yang Hyo-jin	14 December 1989	1.90 m (6 ft 3 in)	72 kg (159 lb)	308 cm (121 in)	301 cm (119 in)	(South Korea) Suwon Hyundai
15	Kim Yu-ri	11 September 1991	1.82 m (6 ft 0 in)	75 kg (165 lb)	300 cm (120 in)	290 cm (110 in)	(South Korea) GS Caltex Seoul KIXX
17	Kim Mi-youn	5 March 1993	1.78 m (5 ft 10 in)	62 kg (137 lb)	290 cm (110 in)	280 cm (110 in)	(South Korea) Hwaseong IBK Altos
18	Hwang Min-kyoung	2 June 1990	1.74 m (5 ft 9 in)	64 kg (141 lb)	290 cm (110 in)	282 cm (111 in)	(South Korea) Suwon Hyundai

=== Vietnam ===
The following is the Vietnamese roster in the 2017 Asian Championship.

Head Coach: Hidehiro Irisawa

No.	Name	Date of birth	Height	Weight	Spike	Block	2016–17 club
1	Doan Thi Xuan	17 May 1997	1.84 m (6 ft 0 in)	64 kg (141 lb)	310 cm (120 in)	305 cm (120 in)	(Vietnam) Vietinbank
3	Tran Thi Thanh Thuy	12 November 1997	1.90 m (6 ft 3 in)	68 kg (150 lb)	315 cm (124 in)	310 cm (120 in)	(Vietnam) VTV Binh Dien
5	Pham Thi Kim Hue	3 August 1982	1.80 m (5 ft 11 in)	70 kg (150 lb)	312 cm (123 in)	305 cm (120 in)	(Vietnam) Vietinbank
7	Ha Ngoc Diem	22 December 1994	1.77 m (5 ft 10 in)	58 kg (128 lb)	310 cm (120 in)	295 cm (116 in)	(Vietnam) Vinh Long
8	Nguyen Thi Kim Lien	10 February 1993	1.58 m (5 ft 2 in)	53 kg (117 lb)	280 cm (110 in)	275 cm (108 in)	(Vietnam) VTV Binh Dien
9	Nguyen Thi Ngoc Hoa (c)	10 November 1987	1.83 m (6 ft 0 in)	64 kg (141 lb)	315 cm (124 in)	305 cm (120 in)	(Vietnam) VTV Binh Dien
10	Bui Vu Thanh Tuyen	30 May 1991	1.65 m (5 ft 5 in)	58 kg (128 lb)	285 cm (112 in)	280 cm (110 in)	(Vietnam) Vietinbank
11	Nguyen Thi Hong Dao	24 July 1994	1.74 m (5 ft 9 in)	66 kg (146 lb)	294 cm (116 in)	290 cm (110 in)	(Vietnam) VTV Binh Dien
13	Nguyen Linh Chi	31 July 1990	1.73 m (5 ft 8 in)	62 kg (137 lb)	286 cm (113 in)	280 cm (110 in)	(Vietnam) Lien Viet Postbank
16	Dinh Thi Thuy	16 April 1998	1.75 m (5 ft 9 in)	67 kg (148 lb)	298 cm (117 in)	290 cm (110 in)	(Vietnam) Vietinbank
17	Le Thanh Thuy	23 May 1995	1.80 m (5 ft 11 in)	62 kg (137 lb)	300 cm (120 in)	295 cm (116 in)	(Vietnam) Vietinbank
18	Bui Thi Nga	15 August 1994	1.86 m (6 ft 1 in)	65 kg (143 lb)	300 cm (120 in)	295 cm (116 in)	(Vietnam) Lien Viet Postbank

=== Sri Lanka ===
The following is the Sri Lankan roster for the 2017 Asian Championship.

Head coach: Sumith Jayalal

No.	Name	Date of birth	Height	Weight	Spike	Block	2016–17 club
1	Kanchana Wijekoon	25 March 1989	1.86 m (6 ft 1 in)	88 kg (194 lb)	290 cm (110 in)	277 cm (109 in)	Sri Lanka Army
2	Dinesha Prasadani (c)	11 November 1987	1.74 m (5 ft 9 in)	67 kg (148 lb)	280 cm (110 in)	270 cm (110 in)	Sri Lanka Air Force
4	Ashani Jayathunga	13 July 1990	1.69 m (5 ft 7 in)	61 kg (134 lb)	265 cm (104 in)	252 cm (99 in)	Sri Lanka Air Force
5	Wasana Dharmatissa	7 July 1990	1.60 m (5 ft 3 in)	56 kg (123 lb)	266 cm (105 in)	243 cm (96 in)	Sri Lanka Army
6	Thilini Perera	18 October 1995	1.70 m (5 ft 7 in)	50 kg (110 lb)	304 cm (120 in)	294 cm (116 in)	Sri Lanka Army
7	Hashini Lakshika	30 October 1991	1.73 m (5 ft 8 in)	66 kg (146 lb)	260 cm (100 in)	250 cm (98 in)	Sri Lanka Army
9	Chathu Ranasingha	27 June 1989	1.72 m (5 ft 8 in)	60 kg (130 lb)	280 cm (110 in)	264 cm (104 in)	Sri Lanka Army
10	Ayesha Madurika	3 October 1993	1.74 m (5 ft 9 in)	56 kg (123 lb)	278 cm (109 in)	262 cm (103 in)	Sri Lanka Army
11	Iresha Perera	13 December 1981	1.66 m (5 ft 5 in)	64 kg (141 lb)	266 cm (105 in)	253 cm (100 in)	Sri Lanka Army
12	Dilusha Sanjeewani	27 March 1991	1.58 m (5 ft 2 in)	50 kg (110 lb)	250 cm (98 in)	232 cm (91 in)	Sri Lanka Navy
16	Sanju Karunarathna	1 December 1993	1.79 m (5 ft 10 in)	64 kg (141 lb)	275 cm (108 in)	260 cm (100 in)	Sri Lanka Army
19	Apsara Senevirathna	20 October 1995	1.72 m (5 ft 8 in)	59 kg (130 lb)	296 cm (117 in)	288 cm (113 in)	Sri Lanka Army

=== New Zealand ===
The following is the New Zealand roster for the 2017 Asian Championship.

Head coach: Alisfer McKenzie

No.	Name	Date of birth	Height	Weight	Spike	Block	2016–17 club
1	Terisa Maulolo	2 December 1991	1.89 m (6 ft 2 in)	90 kg (200 lb)	316 cm (124 in)	308 cm (121 in)	New Zealand
2	Luisa Giles-Baker	13 July 1994	1.87 m (6 ft 2 in)	84 kg (185 lb)	314 cm (124 in)	307 cm (121 in)	New Zealand
3	Samantha Cording	28 June 1993	1.70 m (5 ft 7 in)	65 kg (143 lb)	287 cm (113 in)	283 cm (111 in)	New Zealand
4	Phoenix Paniora	25 July 2000	1.72 m (5 ft 8 in)	60 kg (130 lb)	289 cm (114 in)	287 cm (113 in)	New Zealand
5	Danielle Tuagalu	27 November 1992	1.73 m (5 ft 8 in)	69 kg (152 lb)	305 cm (120 in)	300 cm (120 in)	New Zealand
6	Abbie Meredith	17 July 1995	1.65 m (5 ft 5 in)	60 kg (130 lb)	0 cm (0 in)	0 cm (0 in)	New Zealand
7	Lauren Fleury	14 July 1983	1.74 m (5 ft 9 in)	88 kg (194 lb)	285 cm (112 in)	280 cm (110 in)	New Zealand
8	Stacy Niao (c)	28 October 1992	1.78 m (5 ft 10 in)	72 kg (159 lb)	305 cm (120 in)	300 cm (120 in)	New Zealand
9	Melissa Cairns	12 August 1993	1.73 m (5 ft 8 in)	75 kg (165 lb)	298 cm (117 in)	296 cm (117 in)	New Zealand
10	Katie Adamson	14 October 1993	1.79 m (5 ft 10 in)	80 kg (180 lb)	300 cm (120 in)	296 cm (117 in)	New Zealand
12	Margaret Lafaele	23 September 1990	1.80 m (5 ft 11 in)	90 kg (200 lb)	305 cm (120 in)	300 cm (120 in)	New Zealand
17	Danielle Pierce	6 September 1991	1.73 m (5 ft 8 in)	62 kg (137 lb)	0 cm (0 in)	0 cm (0 in)	New Zealand
20	Francesca Edmondson	18 April 1991	1.85 m (6 ft 1 in)	75 kg (165 lb)	300 cm (120 in)	296 cm (117 in)	New Zealand

== Pool D ==
=== Thailand ===
The following is the Thai roster in the 2017 Asian Championship.

Head coach: Danai Sriwatcharamethakul

No.	Name	Date of birth	Height	Weight	Spike	Block	2016–17 club
1	Wipawee Srithong	28 January 1999	1.74 m (5 ft 9 in)	65 kg (143 lb)	288 cm (9 ft 5 in)	266 cm (8 ft 9 in)	(Thailand) Supreme Chonburi
2	Piyanut Pannoy	10 November 1989	1.71 m (5 ft 7 in)	62 kg (137 lb)	280 cm (9 ft 2 in)	275 cm (9 ft 0 in)	(Thailand) Supreme Chonburi
3	Pornpun Guedpard	5 May 1993	1.73 m (5 ft 8 in)	63 kg (139 lb)	288 cm (9 ft 5 in)	279 cm (9 ft 2 in)	(Thailand) Bangkok Glass
5	Pleumjit Thinkaow (c)	9 November 1983	1.80 m (5 ft 11 in)	67 kg (148 lb)	303 cm (9 ft 11 in)	283 cm (9 ft 3 in)	(Thailand) Bangkok Glass
7	Hattaya Bamrungsuk	12 August 1993	1.80 m (5 ft 11 in)	71 kg (157 lb)	292 cm (9 ft 7 in)	282 cm (9 ft 3 in)	(Thailand) Nakhon Ratchasima
9	Jarasporn Bundasak	1 March 1993	1.81 m (5 ft 11 in)	65 kg (143 lb)	291 cm (9 ft 7 in)	283 cm (9 ft 3 in)	(Thailand) Bangkok Glass
10	Wilavan Apinyapong	6 June 1984	1.74 m (5 ft 9 in)	70 kg (150 lb)	294 cm (9 ft 8 in)	282 cm (9 ft 3 in)	(Thailand) Supreme Chonburi
12	Tapaphaipun Chaisri	29 November 1989	1.68 m (5 ft 6 in)	70 kg (150 lb)	295 cm (9 ft 8 in)	276 cm (9 ft 1 in)	(Thailand) Khonkaen Star
13	Nootsara Tomkom	7 July 1985	1.69 m (5 ft 7 in)	57 kg (126 lb)	289 cm (9 ft 6 in)	278 cm (9 ft 1 in)	(Turkey) Fenerbahçe
16	Pimpichaya Kokram	16 June 1998	1.78 m (5 ft 10 in)	62 kg (137 lb)	293 cm (9 ft 7 in)	283 cm (9 ft 3 in)	(Thailand) 3BB Nakornnont
17	Tichaya Boonlert	14 February 1997	1.79 m (5 ft 10 in)	64 kg (141 lb)	293 cm (9 ft 7 in)	284 cm (9 ft 4 in)	(Thailand) 3BB Nakornnont
18	Ajcharaporn Kongyot	18 June 1995	1.78 m (5 ft 10 in)	65 kg (143 lb)	298 cm (9 ft 9 in)	287 cm (9 ft 5 in)	(Thailand) Supreme Chonburi
19	Chatchu-on Moksri	6 November 1999	1.78 m (5 ft 10 in)	58 kg (128 lb)	298 cm (9 ft 9 in)	290 cm (9 ft 6 in)	(Thailand) Nakhon Ratchasima
20	Supattra Pairoj	27 June 1990	1.60 m (5 ft 3 in)	58 kg (128 lb)	275 cm (9 ft 0 in)	265 cm (8 ft 8 in)	(Thailand) Supreme Chonburi

=== Chinese Taipei ===
The following is the Taiwanese roster in the 2017 Asian Championship.

Head Coach: Lin Min-hui

No.	Name	Date of birth	Height	Weight	Spike	Block	2016–17 club
1	Lin Shu-ho	6 February 1999	1.67 m (5 ft 6 in)	62 kg (137 lb)	272 cm (107 in)	262 cm (103 in)	Chinese Taipei
2	Hsiao Hsiang-ling	2 January 1993	1.70 m (5 ft 7 in)	69 kg (152 lb)	260 cm (100 in)	248 cm (98 in)	Chinese Taipei
5	Chen Yi-ju	21 December 1989	1.73 m (5 ft 8 in)	68 kg (150 lb)	277 cm (109 in)	275 cm (108 in)	Chinese Taipei
6	Hsieh Yi-chen	25 September 1990	1.65 m (5 ft 5 in)	58 kg (128 lb)	280 cm (110 in)	275 cm (108 in)	Chinese Taipei
7	Tseng Wan-ling	13 May 1996	1.71 m (5 ft 7 in)	66 kg (146 lb)	290 cm (110 in)	277 cm (109 in)	Chinese Taipei
9	Chang Li-yun	28 February 1991	1.80 m (5 ft 11 in)	66 kg (146 lb)	288 cm (113 in)	276 cm (109 in)	Chinese Taipei
11	Chen Wan-ting (c)	25 November 1990	1.78 m (5 ft 10 in)	65 kg (143 lb)	280 cm (110 in)	290 cm (110 in)	Chinese Taipei
12	Yang Meng-hua	15 August 1991	1.70 m (5 ft 7 in)	67 kg (148 lb)	270 cm (110 in)	262 cm (103 in)	Chinese Taipei
15	Lee Tzu-ying	4 July 1994	1.74 m (5 ft 9 in)	71 kg (157 lb)	274 cm (108 in)	265 cm (104 in)	Chinese Taipei
16	Chen Tzu-ya	26 August 1997	1.78 m (5 ft 10 in)	61 kg (134 lb)	272 cm (107 in)	271 cm (107 in)	Chinese Taipei
18	Huang Hsin-yu	25 February 1998	1.79 m (5 ft 10 in)	63 kg (139 lb)	289 cm (114 in)	279 cm (110 in)	Chinese Taipei
19	Wu Wei-hua	5 February 1994	1.73 m (5 ft 8 in)	73 kg (161 lb)	278 cm (109 in)	267 cm (105 in)	Chinese Taipei

=== Iran ===
The following is the Iranian roster in the 2017 Asian Championship.

Head Coach: Mirmostafa Shojaei

No.	Name	Date of birth	Height	Weight	Spike	Block	2016–17 club
1	Mahdieh Khajehkolaei	13 September 1988	1.78 m (5 ft 10 in)	75 kg (165 lb)	280 cm (110 in)	270 cm (110 in)	(Iran) Sarmayeh Bank
3	Mina Roosta	21 March 1993	1.78 m (5 ft 10 in)	69 kg (152 lb)	280 cm (110 in)	270 cm (110 in)	(Iran) Saipa
4	Soudabeh Bagherpour	16 September 1990	1.88 m (6 ft 2 in)	66 kg (146 lb)	281 cm (111 in)	271 cm (107 in)	(Iran) Azad University
7	Zeinab Giveh (c)	11 July 1983	1.76 m (5 ft 9 in)	64 kg (141 lb)	265 cm (104 in)	255 cm (100 in)	(Iran) Bul
8	Mahsa Saberi	14 February 1993	1.78 m (5 ft 10 in)	73 kg (161 lb)	280 cm (110 in)	270 cm (110 in)	(Iran) Sarmayeh Bank
9	Neda Chamlanian	7 March 1994	1.82 m (6 ft 0 in)	72 kg (159 lb)	275 cm (108 in)	265 cm (104 in)	(Iran) Zob Ahan
10	Maedeh Borhani	22 June 1988	1.83 m (6 ft 0 in)	72 kg (159 lb)	287 cm (113 in)	277 cm (109 in)	(Iran) Bul
11	Mahsa Kadkhoda	22 June 1993	1.82 m (6 ft 0 in)	72 kg (159 lb)	275 cm (108 in)	265 cm (104 in)	(Iran) Sarmayeh Bank
12	Farzaneh Zareii	29 October 1991	1.82 m (6 ft 0 in)	73 kg (161 lb)	273 cm (107 in)	260 cm (100 in)	(Iran) Zob Ahan
13	Negar Kiani	8 June 1992	1.70 m (5 ft 7 in)	60 kg (130 lb)	259 cm (102 in)	249 cm (98 in)	(Iran) Azad University
14	Farzaneh Moradian	6 June 1992	1.69 m (5 ft 7 in)	65 kg (143 lb)	255 cm (100 in)	245 cm (96 in)	(Iran) Zob Ahan
15	Elham Fallah	14 April 1994	1.73 m (5 ft 8 in)	68 kg (150 lb)	260 cm (100 in)	251 cm (99 in)	(Iran) Saipa
16	Tahmineh Dargazani	26 March 1996	1.90 m (6 ft 3 in)	71 kg (157 lb)	290 cm (110 in)	260 cm (100 in)	(Iran) Sarmayeh Bank
18	Faranak Babelian	17 April 1992	1.77 m (5 ft 10 in)	69 kg (152 lb)	272 cm (107 in)	260 cm (100 in)	(Iran) Zob Ahan

=== Maldives ===
The following is the Maldivian roster in the 2017 Asian Championship.

Head Coach: Mohamed Nadheem

No.	Name	Date of birth	Height	Weight	Spike	Block	2016–17 club
1	Zareer Joozan	21 August 1995	1.57 m (5 ft 2 in)	58 kg (128 lb)	261 cm (103 in)	247 cm (97 in)	(Maldives) Police Club
2	Waheed Nuha	21 October 1994	1.51 m (4 ft 11 in)	49 kg (108 lb)	239 cm (94 in)	225 cm (89 in)	(Maldives) Fysda
3	Sahir Silma	21 January 1995	1.64 m (5 ft 5 in)	56 kg (123 lb)	256 cm (101 in)	245 cm (96 in)	(Maldives) Maldivian RC
4	Mariyam Mizna	4 February 1996	1.56 m (5 ft 1 in)	55 kg (121 lb)	263 cm (104 in)	252 cm (99 in)	(Maldives) Maldivian RC
6	Rashidha Hawwa	20 November 1992	1.72 m (5 ft 8 in)	73 kg (161 lb)	277 cm (109 in)	267 cm (105 in)	(Maldives) Police Club
7	Adam Shaufa	7 February 1994	1.67 m (5 ft 6 in)	62 kg (137 lb)	270 cm (110 in)	264 cm (104 in)	(Maldives) Maldivian RC
9	Hawwa Sakha	31 January 1994	1.73 m (5 ft 8 in)	71 kg (157 lb)	271 cm (107 in)	260 cm (100 in)	(Maldives) Police Club
10	Aishath Majidha	14 March 1993	1.69 m (5 ft 7 in)	66 kg (146 lb)	266 cm (105 in)	250 cm (98 in)	(Maldives) Maldivian RC
11	Aishath Shaffa (c)	8 March 1989	1.70 m (5 ft 7 in)	68 kg (150 lb)	267 cm (105 in)	256 cm (101 in)	(Maldives) Maldivian RC
14	Aishath Imthinan	20 September 1995	1.67 m (5 ft 6 in)	74 kg (163 lb)	266 cm (105 in)	254 cm (100 in)	(Maldives) Maldivian RC
17	Aminath Areesha	24 June 1998	1.56 m (5 ft 1 in)	56 kg (123 lb)	264 cm (104 in)	251 cm (99 in)	(Maldives) Police Club
18	Aminath Riyasa	5 January 1997	1.69 m (5 ft 7 in)	61 kg (134 lb)	276 cm (109 in)	261 cm (103 in)	(Maldives) Fysda
