= 2025 AVC Women's Volleyball Champions League squads =

This article shows the rosters of all participating teams at the 2025 AVC Women's Volleyball Champions League in Pasig, Metro Manila in the Philippines.

Previously known as the Asian Women's Club Volleyball Championship, the AVC Women's Champions League allows each team can now have a maximum of three foreign players in its roster that can play at any time. Previously in the Club Championship, teams can only have two foreign players and only one of which can play at a time.

For the purpose of quota, an athlete is a "foreign player" if their FIVB sporting nationality is different than the club's national volleyball federation affiliation. A player's FIVB sporting nationality is independent of their citizenship/s. A domestic league may also handle sporting nationality differently.

== Pool A ==
=== Creamline Cool Smashers ===
The following is the roster of the Filipino club Creamline Cool Smashers in the 2025 AVC Women's Champions League.

Head coach: (Philippines) Sherwin Meneses

- 1 (Philippines) Kyle Negrito S
- 2 (Philippines) Alyssa Valdez OH
- 3 (Russia) Anastasiya Kudryashova OP
- 5 (Kazakhstan) Anastassiya Kolomoyets MB
- 6 (Philippines) Jeanette Panaga MB
- 7 (Philippines) Michele Gumabao OP
- 8 (Philippines) Ella de Jesus OH
- 9 (Philippines) Lorie Bernardo MB
- 11 (Philippines) Kyla Atienza L
- 19 (Philippines) Bernadeth Pons OH
- 21 (Philippines) Rhea Dimaculangan S
- 22 (United States) Erica Staunton OH
- 23 (Philippines) Jema Galanza OH
- 24 (Philippines) Aleiah Torres L

=== Zhetysu ===
The following is the roster of the Kazakh club Zhetysu in the 2025 AVC Women's Champions League.

Head coach: (Serbia) Marko Gršić

- 1 (Kazakhstan) Perizat Nurbergenova OH
- 5 (Ukraine) Karina Denisova OH
- 7 (Ukraine) Yuliya Dymar OH
- 9 (Kazakhstan) Valeriya Yakutina MB
- 10 (Kazakhstan) Irina Kenzhebaeva OH
- 11 (Kazakhstan) Mariya Syrygina L
- 13 (Kazakhstan) Kristina Belova OH
- 14 (Ukraine) Daria Sharhorodska S
- 15 (Kazakhstan) Madina Beket L
- 16 (Kazakhstan) Tatyana Nikitina OP
- 18 (Kazakhstan) Kristina Anikonova MB
- 21 (Kazakhstan) Alina Ashkhabekova S
- 23 (Kazakhstan) Olga Khadzhioglo MB
- 27 (Kazakhstan) Nataliya Borisenko MB

=== Al Naser ===
The following is the roster of the Jordani club Al Naser in the 2025 AVC Women's Champions League.

Head coach: (Egypt) Hassan El Hossary

- 1 (Jordan) Al Ashoush Ghayda'a OH
- 2 (Jordan) Rand Haimur L
- 3 (Jordan) Ragad Haimur S
- 4 (Brazil) Natiele Gonçalves OH
- 7 (Jordan) Tala Abu Zaid OP
- 9 (Jordan) Dana Al Mashaileh MB
- 10 (Jordan) Rahaf Haimur OH
- 11 (Brazil) Ilisandra Klein OH
- 13 (Jordan) Shahed Awamleh MB
- 17 (Brazil) Isabela Paquiardi OH
- 19 (Jordan) Haya Kardan OP
- 20 (Jordan) Sara Makahleh S

== Pool B ==
=== Petro Gazz Angels ===
The following is the roster of the Filipino club Petro Gazz Angels in the 2025 AVC Women's Champions League.

Head coach: (Japan) Koji Tsuzurabara

- 2 (Philippines) Djanel Cheng S
- 3 (Philippines) Donnalyn Paralejas S
- 5 (Philippines) Joy Dacoron MB
- 7 (Philippines) Jellie Tempiatura L
- 8 (Philippines) Aiza Maizo-Pontillas OP
- 9 (Philippines) Remy Palma MB
- 10 (United States) Brooke Van Sickle OH
- 13 (United States) MJ Phillips MB
- 15 (Philippines) Myla Pablo OH
- 16 (Philippines) Ranya Musa MB
- 17 (Philippines) Chie Saet S
- 20 (Philippines) Jonah Sabete OH
- 23 (Philippines) Baby Love Barbon L
- 77 (United States) Gia Day OH

=== Kaohsiung Taipower ===
The following is the roster of the Taiwanese club Kaohsiung Taipower in the 2025 AVC Women's Champions League.

Head coach: (Chinese Taipei) Chang Li-yun

- 1 (Chinese Taipei) Hu Xiao-pei MB
- 2 (Chinese Taipei) Liu Yu-chun S
- 4 (Chinese Taipei) Lin Cai-zhen MB
- 5 (Chinese Taipei) Wu Min-yu L
- 7 (Chinese Taipei) Huang Hsin-yu MB
- 9 (Chinese Taipei) Tsai Yu-chun OH
- 10 (Chinese Taipei) Hsu Wan-yun OH
- 11 (Chinese Taipei) Hung Chia-yao S
- 12 (Chinese Taipei) Peng Yu-rou OH
- 13 (Chinese Taipei) Pao Yin-chi MB
- 16 (Chinese Taipei) Lin Xi OH
- 20 (Chinese Taipei) Huang Ching-hsuan OP

=== Hip Hing ===
The following is the roster of the Hong Kong club Hip Hing in the 2025 AVC Women's Champions League.

Head coach: (Hong Kong) Wong Suk Yee

- 1 (Hong Kong) Ng Ki Tung OP
- 2 (Hong Kong) Tam Wing Tung MB
- 3 (Hong Kong) Fung Tsz San S
- 5 (Hong Kong) Ho Kin Yiu MB
- 6 (Hong Kong) Leung Hiu Laam L
- 10 (Hong Kong) Kwan Sze Man OP
- 11 (Hong Kong) Pang Wing Nam L
- 12 (Hong Kong) Pang Wing Lam OH
- 13 (Hong Kong) Lam Tsz Ching OH
- 14 (China) Huang Yuchen S
- 16 (Hong Kong) Wong Sum Yu MB
- 20 (Hong Kong) Fung Hiu Nam OP
- 21 (Hong Kong) Leung Nga Yee MB
- 22 (Hong Kong) Chan Hoi Ching OH

== Pool C ==
=== Beijing BAIC Motor ===
The following is the roster of the Chinese club Beijing BAIC Motor in the 2025 AVC Women's Champions League.

Head coach: (China) Kuang Qi

- 1 (China) Shan Lanfeng OP
- 2 (China) Shen Hongyi OP
- 4 (China) Zhao Yalun S
- 5 (China) Tian Yue MB
- 7 (China) Liu Tian L
- 11 (China) Lu Yufei OH
- 12 (China) Cai Yitong S
- 13 (China) Jin Ye OH
- 15 (China) Jiang Liwei OP
- 17 (China) Jin Jiabao MB

=== VTV Bình Điền Long An ===
The following is the roster of the Vietnamese club VTV Bình Điền Long An in the 2025 AVC Women's Champions League.

Head coach: (Vietnam) Thái Quang Lai

- 1 (Vietnam) Nguyễn Thị Trà My OP
- 2 (Vietnam) Đặng Thị Kim Thanh MB
- 3 (Vietnam) Trần Thị Thanh Thúy OH
- 8 (Vietnam) Đoàn Thị Mỹ Tiên OH
- 9 (Vietnam) Nguyễn Thị Ngọc Hoa MB
- 10 (Vietnam) Lê Như Anh MB
- 12 (Vietnam) Nguyễn Khánh Đang L
- 14 (Vietnam) Võ Thị Kim Thoa S
- 15 (Vietnam) Vi Thị Như Quỳnh OH
- 16 (Vietnam) Nguyễn Lan Vy OH
- 17 (Vietnam) Trần Nguyễn Quý Uyên S
- 18 (Vietnam) Nguyễn Ngọc Mỹ Tiên L
- 20 (Vietnam) Lữ Thị Phương MB
- 22 (Poland) Natalia Lijewska OH

=== Saipa Tehran ===
The following is the roster of the Iranian club Saipa Tehran in the 2025 AVC Women's Champions League.

Head coach: (Iran) Samira Imanifouladi

- 1 (Iran) Setayesh Jebeli OH
- 2 (Iran) Mona Derismahmoudi MB
- 4 (Iran) Soudabeh Bagherpour MB
- 6 (Iran) Shabnam Alikhani S
- 7 (Iran) Mahta Yahyapour MB
- 8 (Iran) Mahsa Saberi OH
- 9 (Iran) Neda Chamlanian OP
- 10 (Iran) Zahra Karimi MB
- 11 (Iran) Mahsa Kadkhoda OH
- 13 (Iran) Negar Kiani L
- 15 (Iran) Fatemeh Khalili OH
- 16 (Iran) Zahra Moghani Ghahremanlooei S
- 18 (Iran) Zahra Bakhshi L
- 20 (Iran) Elahe Poorsaleh Shahdehsari OP

== Pool D ==
=== Nakhon Ratchasima QminC ===
The following is the roster of the Thai club Nakhon Ratchasima QminC in the 2025 AVC Women's Champions League.

Head coach: (Thailand) Somchai Donpraiyod

- 2 (Thailand) Tikamporn Changkeaw L
- 3 (Thailand) Sirima Manakij S
- 5 (Greece) Eva Chantava OH
- 6 (Thailand) Onuma Sittirak OH
- 8 (United States) Anyse Smith OP
- 10 (Thailand) Saowapha Soosuk OP
- 11 (Thailand) Sasipapron Janthawisut OH
- 12 (Thailand) Waruni Kanram MB
- 15 (Japan) Yuka Makimori L
- 16 (Thailand) Kantima Aekpatcha OH
- 24 (Thailand) Tichakorn Boonlert MB
- 25 (Thailand) Soraya Phomla S
- 41 (Thailand) Kaewkalaya Kamulthala MB
- 68 (Thailand) Wiranyupa Inchan OP

=== PLDT High Speed Hitters ===
The following is the roster of the Filipino club PLDT High Speed Hitters in the 2025 AVC Women's Champions League.

Head coach: (Philippines) Rald Ricafort

- 1 (Philippines) Nieza Viray L
- 2 (Cuba) Wilma Salas OH
- 3 (Philippines) Mika Reyes MB
- 5 (Philippines) Erika Santos OP
- 6 (Canada) Savi Davison OH
- 8 (Philippines) Kath Arado L
- 9 (Philippines) Kim Fajardo S
- 10 (Philippines) Majoy Baron MB
- 11 (Philippines) Kim Kianna Dy OP
- 13 (Philippines) Dell Palomata MB
- 14 (Philippines) Kiesha Bedonia OH
- 16 (Philippines) Angelica Alcantara S
- 17 (Philippines) Fiola Ceballos OH
- 19 (Philippines) Jovie Prado OH

=== Queensland Pirates ===
The following is the roster of the Australian club Queensland Pirates in the 2025 AVC Women's Champions League.

Head coach: (Australia) Terry Rudder

- 2 (Australia) Kylee White S
- 3 (Australia) Alisha Stevens OH
- 4 (Australia) Denzi Elley L
- 5 (Australia) Milla Greber S
- 6 (Australia) Amy McCarthy MB
- 10 (Australia) Matisse Sipa Borgeaud OH
- 11 (Australia) Holly Mallet OH
- 13 (Australia) Scarlett Rudder MB
- 24 (Australia) Jodeci Faraimo-Saolele OH
- 27 (Australia) Lilyana Stanojevic OP
- 28 (Australia) Thea Biss MB
