= 2024 Asian Women's Club Volleyball Championship squads =

This article shows the rosters of all participating teams at the 2024 Asian Women's Club Volleyball Championship in Nakhon Ratchasima, Thailand.

== Pool A ==
=== Kuanysh ===
The following is the roster of the Kazakh club Kuanysh in the 2024 Asian Club Championship.

Head coach: (Kazakhstan) Azamat Yessimov

- 1 (Bulgaria) Petya Barakova S
- 2 (Kazakhstan) Sabira Bekisheva L
- 5 (Kazakhstan) Sofiya Gorbacheba OH
- 7 (Kazakhstan) Yekaterina Seleznyova MB
- 8 (Kazakhstan) Polina Ufimtseva MB
- 9 (Ukraine) Yulia Dymar OH
- 14 (Kazakhstan) Zhanna Syroyeshkina OH
- 17 (Kazakhstan) Margrita Belchenko OP
- 18 (Russia) Anastasiya Kudryashova OP
- 20 (Kazakhstan) Kristina Shvidkaya L
- 22 (Kazakhstan) Sana Anarkulova OH
- 29 (Kazakhstan) Ayaulym Turdykhanova OP
- 88 (Kazakhstan) Anastassiya Kolomoyets MB
- 99 (Kazakhstan) Irina Kuznetsova S

=== Đức Giang Chemical Club ===
The following is the roster of the Vietnamese club Đức Giang Chemical Club in the 2024 Asian Club Championship.

Head coach: (Vietnam) Phạm Văn Long

- 2 (Vietnam) Cao Thị Hoa Thắm
- 3 (Vietnam) Lê Thị Thanh Liên
- 5 (Vietnam) Hoàng Thị Hồng Ngát
- 7 (Vietnam) Trần Tú Linh
- 8 (Vietnam) Nguyễn Thị Kiều Oanh
- 9 (Vietnam) Trần Thị Bích Thủy
- 10 (Vietnam) Nông Thùy Anh
- 14 (Thailand) Tichaya Boonlert
- 15 (Vietnam) Phạm Thị Khánh Lâm
- 16 (Vietnam) Nguyễn Thị Thủy
- 19 (Vietnam) Lý Thị Luyến
- 20 (Vietnam) Luân Thị Loan
- 23 (Vietnam) Hoàng Hồng Hạnh
- 30 (Russia) Elena Samoilenko

=== Nakhon Ratchasima QminC ===
The following is the roster of the Thai club Nakhon Ratchasima QminC in the 2024 Asian Club Championship.

Head coach: (Thailand) Somchai Donpraiyod

- 1 (Thailand) Sanitklang Nattaporn
- 3 (Thailand) Manakit Sirima
- 4 (Thailand) Kamlangmak Chitaporn
- 5 (Thailand) Sittisad Patcharaporn
- 6 (Thailand) Sittirak Onuma
- 7 (United States) Markenzie Benoit
- 9 (Thailand) Khumthong Amornthip
- 10 (Thailand) Phontham Papatchaya
- 11 (Thailand) Janthawisut Sasipapron
- 12 (Thailand) Kanram Warruni
- 14 (Thailand) Intharasit Parichat
- 15 (Japan) Kotoe Inoue
- 16 (Croatia) Katarina Pilepić
- 19 (Thailand) Paowana Nokyoong

=== Kwai Tsing ===
The following is the roster of the Hong Kong club Kwai Tsing in the 2024 Asian Club Championship.

Head coach: (Hong Kong) Leung King Laam

- 1 (Hong Kong) Tsang Ngok Ling
- 2 (Hong Kong) Kwan Lok Yi
- 3 (Hong Kong) Li Pui Ki
- 5 (Hong Kong) To Wing Man
- 6 (Hong Kong) Lin Wing Lam
- 7 (Hong Kong) Cheung Nok In
- 10 (Hong Kong) Chan Pui Shan
- 11 (Hong Kong) Lau See Wai
- 12 (Hong Kong) Lai Lok Chi
- 14 (Hong Kong) Shum Lam
- 15 (Hong Kong) Yu Ying Chi
- 19 (Hong Kong) Chiu Wing Ki
- 20 (Hong Kong) To Wingtung
- 25 (Hong Kong) Michelle Cheung Hiu-nok

== Pool B ==
=== Monolith Sky Risers ===
The following is the roster of Filipino collegiate team NU Lady Bulldogs playing under the club name Monolith Sky Risers in the 2024 Asian Club Championship.

Head coach: (Philippines) Sherwin Meneses

- 1 (Philippines) Kaye Bombita
- 3 (Philippines) Abegail Pono
- 4 (Philippines) Mhicaela Belen
- 5 (Philippines) Shaira Jardio
- 6 (Philippines) Evangeline Alinsug
- 10 (Philippines) Nicole Mata
- 12 (Philippines) Alyssa Solomon
- 13 (Philippines) Camilla Lamina
- 14 (Philippines) Erin Pangilinan
- 16 (Philippines) Patriz Salazar
- 17 (Philippines) Minierva Maaya
- 18 (Philippines) Arah Panique
- 19 (Philippines) Celine Marsh
- 20 (Philippines) IC Cepada

=== Saipa Tehran ===
The following is the roster of the Iranian club Saipa Tehran in the 2024 Asian Club Championship.

Head coach: (Iran) Niloofar Hojati

- 1 (Iran) Aytak Salamat
- 2 (Iran) Mona Derismahmoudi
- 3 (Iran) Reyhaneh Davarpanah
- 4 (Iran) Soudabeh Bagherpour
- 6 (Iran) Shabnam Alikhani
- 8 (Iran) Zahra Bakhshi
- 9 (Iran) Neda Chamlanian
- 10 (Iran) Zahra Karimi
- 11 (Iran) Mahsa Kadkhoda
- 13 (Iran) Negar Kiani
- 14 (Iran) Pouran Zare
- 15 (Iran) Fatemeh Khalili Chermahini
- 19 (Iran) Mahtab Rahmani
- 22 (Iran) Fatemeh Manzouri Shirehjini

=== LP Bank Ninh Bình ===
The following is the roster of the Vietnamese club LP Bank Ninh Bình in the 2024 Asian Club Championship.

Head coach: (Vietnam) Thái Thanh Tùng

- 1 (Vietnam) Dương Thị Yến Nhi
- 3 (Vietnam) Nguyễn Thị Thanh Diệu
- 4 (Vietnam) Tôn Thị Minh Thư
- 6 (Vietnam) Nguyễn Thị Kim Liên
- 7 (Vietnam) Nguyễn Thị Hoài Mi
- 8 (Vietnam) Lê Thanh Thúy
- 10 (Vietnam) Nguyễn Thị Bích Tuyền
- 11 (Vietnam) Nguyễn Thu Hà
- 14 (Thailand) Warisara Setaloed
- 15 (Vietnam) Nguyễn Thị Trinh
- 16 (Vietnam) Đinh Thị Thúy
- 17 (Vietnam) Bùi Thị Bích Nga
- 18 (Vietnam) Lưu Thị Huệ

=== NEC Red Rockets ===
The following is the roster of the Japanese club NEC Red Rockets in the 2024 Asian Club Championship.

Head coach: (Japan) Takayuki Kaneko

- 1 (Japan) Haruyo Shimamura
- 3 (Japan) Shiori Tsukada
- 4 (Japan) Ai Hirota
- 6 (Japan) Yuka Sawada
- 7 (Japan) Moeka Kinoe
- 8 (Japan) Kasumi Nojima
- 9 (Japan) Riko Fujii
- 10 (Japan) Tsukasa Nakagawa
- 12 (Japan) Misaki Yamauchi
- 13 (Japan) Yukiko Wada
- 15 (Brazil) Lorrayna da Silva
- 20 (Japan) Sayaka Daikuzono
- 22 (Japan) Haruko Sasaki
