= Kempa =

Kempa is a surname. Notable bearers include:

- Beata Kempa (born 1966), Polish politician
- Bernhard Kempa (1920–2017), German handball player
- Diana Kempa (born 1992), Kazakhstani volleyball player

== See also ==
- Kempa Airport
- Kempa, a Uhlsport brand
