= Salat al-Istikharah =

Islamic prayer offered in the interest of seeking guidance on life issues

Salat al-Istikhaara (Arabic: صلاة الاستخارة), which translates as Prayer of Seeking Counsel, is a prayer recited by Muslims who seek guidance from God when facing a decision in their life. The prayer, known as salah in Arabic, is performed in two units of prayer or raka'ah followed by the supplication of Salat al-Istikhaara. It was revealed as a permissible substitute of belomancy and augury, which is haram in Islam, and was common in pre-Islamic Arabia.

== In Quran ==
Your Lord creates and chooses whatever He wills—the choice is not theirs. Glorified and Exalted is Allah above what they associate ˹with Him˺!

— Quran 28:68

What you dislike may be good for you, and what you love may be bad for you. And Allah knows while you do not know.

— Quran 2:216

And consult them in the affair.

— Quran 3:159

And who (conduct) their affairs by mutual consultation.

— Quran 42:38

== Historical example ==
After the death of Muhammad, the method of digging his grave was selected through istikhara. During the reign of Yazid ibn Muawiyah, Ibn Jubayr decided to rebuild the Kaaba after three days of istikhara. Following the instructions of Caliph Umar (ra), Abd al-Rahman ibn Awf spent three days after Umar's passing engaged in prayer, supplication, and seeking divine guidance (Istikhara), while also consulting with men of wisdom to select the next Caliph.

Al-Miswar ibn Makhrama wrote to Hussain when he departed for Iraq that: "Be warned! Do not be deceived by the letters of the people of Iraq and the words of Ibn al-Zubayr that ‘You join them, they will help you’. Do not leave Mecca. Because if they really need you, they will come to you on camels until they reach you. Then you will be able to go out with strength and equipment. Hussain prayed for his well-being and said: I am doing Istikhara (asking Allah for His good) in this matter.

Imam Ahmad said: Ibrahim bin Khalid narrated to us, Umar bin Abdur Rahman narrated to us, I heard Wahb bin Munabbih say: Dawud (peace be upon him) said: O my Lord, who is the most beloved of Your servants to You? He said: The believer whose appearance is beautiful and whose deeds are good. He said: O my Lord, who is the most hated of Your servants to You? He said: The disbeliever whose appearance is beautiful; he disbelieves and he thanks you - these two (Abu Nuaim narrated this in Hilyatul Awliya' (4/55); and his narration is: "He disbelieves and he thanks you"). In a narration narrated by Ahmad bin Hanbal, it is stated: Who is the most hated of Your servants to You? He said: The disbeliever whose appearance is beautiful; he disbelieves and he thanks you. He said: That servant made Istikharah to me regarding something and was not satisfied with what I chose for him.

Ibn Taymiyyah prayed Istikhara for Ghazan Khan: "O Allah! If You know that Ghazan is fighting to uphold Your Word and to strive in Your way, then help him. And if his aim is only to gain worldly power and wealth, then reward him accordingly."

== Description of the prayer ==
The description of Salat al-Istikhaara which translates to "Prayer of Seeking Counsel" was narrated by the well known disciple of Muhammad, Jabir ibn ‘Abd-Allah al-Salami, who said:

The Messenger of Allah used to teach his companions to seek counsel from Allah (Istikhaara) in all things, just as he used to teach them chapters from the Qur'an. He said:

'If any one of you is concerned about a decision he has to make or wants to take an action then let him pray two units raka'ah of voluntary salah prayer and say: Pronunciation: Allah-humma inni astakhiruka bi-ilmika wa astakdiruka bi-qudratika wa asaluka min fazbalikal azeem, faynaka taqdiru wala aqdiru wata'lamu wala a'lamu wa anta Allah-mul ghayub. Allah-humma in kunta ta'alamu anna ha-zal amar ( ) khairul li fi deeni wa maashi wa aqibati amri wa a-jilihi wa a'-jilih, faqdurhu li, wa yassirhu li, summa ba-rik li fih. oya in kunta ta'lamu anna ha-jal amra sharrun lee fee dini, wa ma'ay-shi oya 'ay-kkibati amri, fasrifahu 'anni wasrifni 'anhu, wakdur lial-khair. hysu ka-na, summa ardwini bih.

"O Allah, I seek Your counsel through Your knowledge and I seek Your assistance through Your might and I ask You from Your immense favour, for verily You alone decree our fate while I do not, and You know while I do not, and You alone possess all knowledge of the Unseen. O Allah, if You know this matter ( mention matter here ) to be good for me in relation to my religion, my life and livelihood and the end of my affairs, my present and future, then decree it for me and facilitate it for me, and then place blessing for me within it, and if You know this affair to be harmful for me concerning my religion, my life and livelihood and the end of my affairs, then remove it from me and remove me from it, and decree for me what is good, wherever it may be, and make me content with it."'

in Al-Musnad. An-Nasa’i added in the supplication: (وأسألك الرضى بعد القضاء, wa'as'aluk alridaa baed alqada') “…and I ask You for contentment after the decree comes to pass.”

Another translation is as follows:

O Allah, I seek Your guidance [in making a choice] by virtue of Your knowledge, and I seek ability by virtue of Your power, and I ask You of Your great bounty. You have power, I have none. And You know, I know not. You are the Knower of hidden things. O Allah, if in Your knowledge, this matter (then it should be mentioned by name) is good for me both in this world and the hereafter, then ordain it for me, make it easy for me, and bless it for me. And if in Your knowledge it is bad for me and for my religion, my livelihood and my affairs (or: for me both in this world and the next), then turn me away from it, [and turn it away from me], and ordain for me the good wherever it may be and make me pleased with it.

Muhammad ibn Bashar (may Allah be pleased with him). ... Abu Bakr as-Siddiq (may Allah be pleased with him) reported: When the Prophet (peace and blessings of Allah be upon him) intended to do something, he would say: (O Allah, make my action good and choose for me a good action).

— Tirmidhi 3516, Grade: Weak (Darus Salam: Zubair Ali Zai) Da’eef, Da’eefah 1515 Grade: Very weak (Albani) (Note: The hadith is weak. We do not know anything about this hadith except from the narration of Janfal (may Allah be pleased with him). According to the hadith scholars, he is Da’eef. He is called Janfal ibn Abdullah al-Arafi. He used to live in Arafa. He narrated this hadith alone, and he has no supporters. /Abu ‘Eesa said: This hadith is weak. We only know this hadith from the narration of Janfal. He is weak according to the scholars of hadith. He is also called Janfal ibn Abdullah al-Arafi because he lived in the area of `Arafat. He narrated this hadith alone and he has no supporters in his narration of this hadith. Shaykh Zubair Ali Za'i concluded that the hadith is weak due to the presence of a specific narrator who is considered unreliable in transmitting hadith. The Weak Narrator: The primary reason for the weakness is the presence of Zanfal ibn 'Abdullah (زنفل بن عبد الله) in the chain. Scholarly Assessment: Zanfal is considered weak or rejected in narration (ḍa'īf or matrūk) by most classical scholars of Jarḥ wa al-Ta'dīl (disparagement and validation of narrators). Shaykh Muhammad Nasiruddin Al-Albani (may Allah have mercy upon him) graded this particular narration as Da'if (Weak). Specific References: * Primary Grading Source: * Book Title: Silsilat al-Ahādīth aḍ-Ḍa‘īfah wal-Mawḍū‘ah (Chain of Weak and Fabricated Hadith). * Hadith Number: No. 3591 (Note: Numbering can vary slightly by edition). * Commentary: Shaykh Al-Albani mentioned the hadith and graded it as Da'if Jiddan (Very Weak), primarily due to the weakness of one of the narrators in the chain named Zanfal ibn Abdullah al-'Arafi. * Compilation Source (Where the hadith is found): * Book Title: Jami' at-Tirmidhi * Hadith Number: No. 3516 * Cross-Reference in other Al-Albani works: * Book Title: Da'if al-Jāmi' aṣ-Ṣaghīr wa Ziyādatih * Hadith Number: No. 5430, according to Shaykh Al-Albani's comprehensive methodology, this specific wording is not authenticated to be relied upon due to issues in its chain of narration (sanad).)

Umar told this quote as supplication of Istikhara,

اللَّهُمَّ إِنْ عَلِمْتَ فِيهِ خَيْرًا فَأَمْضِهِ, (allahumma in alimta feehi khairan fa-'amdih(i)) O Allah, if you know good in it, then make it done.

Al-Bayhaqi and others narrated on the authority of Anas, may God be pleased with him, who said: The Prophet, may God bless him and grant him peace, never set out on a journey without saying, when he stood up from his sitting: “O God, with You I have spread out, to You I have turned, in You I have sought refuge, and upon You I have relied. O God, You are my trust, and You are my hope. O God, suffice me in what concerns me and what I do not care about, and what You know better than I do. Your protection is mighty, Your praise is sublime, and there is no god but You. O God, provide me with piety, forgive me my sins, and guide me to good wherever I turn.” Then he would go out.

=== Istikhara in marriage ===
There is a Sunnah regarding Istikhara in such matters. In a Hadith recorded by Ibn Hibban, the Prophet (ﷺ) first instructed to keep the marriage proposal secret and to perform Istikhara.

Muhammad ibn Ishaq ibn Khuzaymah told us: Yunus ibn Abd al-A'la told us: Ibn Wahb told us: Haywah told us that al-Walid ibn Abi al-Walid told him that Ayyub ibn Khalid ibn Abi Ayyub al-Ansari told him from his father, from his grandfather Abu Ayyub, that the Messenger of Allah (ﷺ) said: Keep the proposal secret, then perform ablution well. Then supplicate as much as Allah has ordained for you. Then praise and glorify your Lord. Then say: "O Allah, You are Almighty and I am not, You know and I do not know, and You are the Knower of the unseen. If You see in so-and-so (mentioning his/her name) anything that is good for my religion, my worldly life, and my hereafter, then ordain it for me. And if someone else is better for me..." then ordain that person for me regarding my religion, my worldly life, and my hereafter.

— Ibn Hibban 4040, Musnad Ahmad 23596

If any man or woman wishes to perform Istikhara for an engagement (i.e., marriage), they should also seek consultation (istishara) and adopt the necessary practical measures, as found in the Hadith of Fatima bint Qais:

Yahya ibn Yahya (rahimahullah) narrated [...] from Fatimah bint Qais (radiyallahu 'anha), who said: Abu Amr ibn Hafs (radiyallahu 'anh) divorced her with an irrevocable divorce while he was away, and sent her a small amount of barley through his agent. She was extremely displeased with this. The agent said, "By Allah, you have no claim to maintenance from us!" So Fatimah bint Qais went to the Messenger of Allah (ﷺ) and informed him of the whole matter. (Having heard her story,) he said, "There is no maintenance for you from your husband Abu Amr ibn Hafs." Then he told her to observe her waiting period (iddah) at the house of Umm Sharik. He then added, "That is a woman whom my Companions frequently visit. Instead, go and observe your waiting period at the house of Ibn Umm Maktum (radiyallahu 'anh), for he is a blind man. There you can put off your garments if you need to. When your waiting period is over, inform me." She said: When my waiting period was over, I informed the Messenger of Allah (ﷺ) that Mu'awiyah ibn Abi Sufyan (radiyallahu 'anh) and Abu Jahm (radiyallahu 'anh) had sent marriage proposals to me. The Messenger of Allah (ﷺ) said: "As for Abu Jahm, he never puts his staff down from his shoulder (he travels a lot / beats his wives), and as for Mu'awiyah, he is a destitute man with no wealth. Marry Usamah ibn Zaid." But I disliked him. He repeated, "Marry Usamah." So I married him, and Allah blessed me immensely through him, to the extent that I became the envy of others.

— Muslim 3589

== Conditions of the prayer ==
Istikhara salat is prayed in case of seeking counsel about a matter, whereas either the action is worthy for oneself or the person is worthy of the action, as Zaynab bint Jahsh prayed istikhara at the marriage proposal from Muhammad, to ascertain whether she herself was worthy for him, as scholars explain.

One must wash themselves ahead of the Salat al-Istikharah, in the same manner as one would do when entering into any salah.

Ibn Hajr said, commenting on this hadith: "Istikharah is a word which means asking Allah to help one make a choice, meaning choosing the best of two things where one needs to choose one of them."

With the salaa completed one should immediately say the supplication of Istikhaara.

Istikhaara is done when a decision is to be made in matters which are neither obligatory nor prohibited. So one does not need to seek counsel from Allah for deciding whether he should go for hajj or not. Because if he is financially and physically able to do it then hajj is obligatory and he does not have a choice. But seeking counsel from Allah (Istikhaara) can be done in all kind of other permissible matters where a choice needs to be made such as buying something, taking a job, or choosing a spouse etc.

It is recorded in hadith that Muhammad used to teach his disciples to seek counsel from Allah (Istikhaara) for every matter just as he used to teach them the Sürah from the Qur'an. Scholars said that istikhara salat is any of two rakah prayers outside fard salat (The obligatory prayer), either it is sunnah or nafl, and during menstruation, women can pray the supplication without prayer and also one can perform this salat in forbidden time in case of emergency.

== Range ==
It is recommended for all acts except the fard and the haram, and the scholars have forbidden any act to be considered unnecessary for Istikhara, because even a small matter can have important consequences, and even a small matter can cause harm. Because Muhammad said take the Lord's advice even in the matter of tying shoelaces. Istikhara is also prescribed for taking Islamic political decisions where the solution can not be found in Quran and hadith clearly. Tahir ibn Husayn advised to his son Abdallah ibn Tahir after he had become a governor of Diyar Rabi'a:

Whenever a matter of importance comes upon you, seek assistance in it by making istikharah to Allah and fearing him... and perform istikhara abundantly in all your matters.

== Language ==
The original Arabic text is below, followed by transliteration using Latin characters.

اللَّهُمَّ إِنِّي أَسْتَخِيرُكَ بِعِلْمِكَ وَأَسْتَقْدِرُكَ بِقُدْرَتِكَ، وَأَسْأَلُكَ مِنْ فَضْلِكَ الْعَظِيمِ، فَإِنَّكَ تَقْدِرُ وَلاَ أَقْدِرُ وَتَعْلَمُ وَلاَ أَعْلَمُ وَأَنْتَ عَلاَّمُ الْغُيُوبِ، اللَّهُمَّ إِنْ كُنْتَ تَعْلَمُ أَنَّ هَذَا الأَمْرَ خَيْرٌ لِي فِي دِينِي وَمَعَاشِي وَعَاقِبَةِ أَمْرِي فَاقْدُرْهُ لِي وَيَسِّرْهُ لِي ثُمَّ بَارِكْ لِي فِيهِ، وَإِنْ كُنْتَ تَعْلَمُ أَنَّ هَذَا الأَمْرَ شَرٌّ لِي فِي دِينِي وَمَعَاشِي وَعَاقِبَةِ أَمْرِي فَاصْرِفْهُ عَنِّي وَاصْرِفْنِي عَنْهُ، وَاقْدُرْ لِي الْخَيْرَ حَيْثُ كَانَ ثُمَّ أَرْضِنِي بِهِ

Allahumma innee astakheeruka bi ilmika wa-astaqdiruka biqudratika wa-as'aluka min fadhlika al-adheem. Fa innaka taqdiru walaa aqdiru. Wa ta'lamu walaa a'lamu wa anta 'alamul ghuyoob. Allahumma in kunta ta'lamu anna haadhal-amra (mention your concern) khayrun liy fiy deeniy wa-ma'aashiy wa-'aaqibati amriy, faqdur hu liy wa-'yassir hu- liy thumma baarik liy feehi. Wa in-kunta ta'lamu anna haadhal amra sharrun liy fiy deeniy wa-ma'aashiy wa-'aaqibati amriy. Fa-srifhu 'annee wa-srifni 'anhu. Wa aqdur lial khayra haythu kaana thumma a-rdhiniy bihee

== Istishara ==
Istishara (Arabic: الاستشارة) literally means seeking counsel or consultation. In Islamic practice, it refers to consulting a trustworthy and knowledgeable person before or after making a decision. Allah commands consultation in the Quran:

"And consult them in the matter" — Quran 3:159

Muhammad himself regularly consulted his companions in important matters, demonstrating that seeking human wisdom alongside divine guidance is encouraged in Islam.

== Repetition ==
According to Albani, Istikhara can not be performed with doubt, it must be performed with firm determination, and it can be reapeated only if performer doubts that, he or she did not gave proper concentration while uttering the supplication, otherwise repeatation of this prayer is Bidah. Others say, one can perform this salat as many times as desired while his doubt about the action persists. Scholars suggest that the narration of praying seven times or seven days is weak, therefore the number of praying in case of doubt is not limited, as Caliph Omar did Istikhara for one month before requesting Abu Bakr for canonizing the Quran because he feared that it would be a Bidah as Muhammad neither did it himself nor ordered to do it. But after doing istikhara for one month he became surely convinced to take decision to do it. Omar bin Khattab sought to collect hadith and did istikhara for a month and cancelled the decision in fear of it being mixed with Quran. Abd al-Razzaaq narrated in al-Musannaf (10/301) from Ibn al-Musayyib that, "‘Umar ibn al-Khattaab wrote a document about the grandfather and kalaalah (issues of inheritance when a grandfather of the deceased was still living, or if the deceased left behind no children), and he continued to pray istikhaarah, saying, "O Allaah, if You know that there is some good in it then let it be." Then when he was stabbed he called for the document, and erased it, and no one knew what was in it. He said: "I wrote something about the grandfather and kalaalah, and I prayed istikhaarah asking Allaah for guidance, then I decided to leave you as you are now." Imam Bukhari before writing each Hadith in his Sahih Bukhari, performed ablution, prayed two rakats and made Istikhara. If there was any doubt in his heart about the hadith then he would not have written it in Sahih Bukhari even though the hadith is authentic according to the conditions. Thus sitting in Masjid an-Nabawi, he started writing it and worked on this work for 16 consecutive years. Al-Shafii said in Kitab al-Umm that, "It was said that zakaah is due on jewellery for personal use, and this is what I pray istikhaarah about, asking Allaah for guidance. Al-Rabee’ said: He prayed istikhaarah, asking Allaah for guidance concerning it, and al-Shaafa’i said: There is no zakaah on jewellery for personal use." Muhaddith Ibn Hibban in al-Majrooheen says (1/194), "Bahz ibn Mu’aawiyah ibn Heedah al-Qushayri, one of the people of Basrah, who narrated from his father, from his grandfather; al-Thawri and Hammaad ibn Salamah narrated from him. He made many mistakes. As for Ahmad ibn Hanbal and Ishaaq ibn Ibraaheem (may Allaah have mercy on him), they quoted him as evidence and narrated from him, but a number of our imams ignored him. Were it not for the hadeeth, "We will take them [the camels that are due as zakaah] and half of his camels as the due of our Lord", I would have included him among the thiqaat (trustworthy). He is one of those concerning whom I pray istikhaarah, asking Allaah for guidance."

== Signs of acceptance ==
There are two sign of the result of istikhara

- The heart will feel ease for the action, either negative or positive
- if the circumstance become easy, then it will be the sign of positivity from Allah, and if the circumstance become difficult or hard, then it will be the sign of negativity from Allah

Scholars say that there are some common superstitions that certain things should be done to obtain a result through istikhara, such as sleeping and seeking signs in dreams, which they reject as there are no trustworthy references in Quran or Hadith about that.

== Opinions of scholars ==
Ibn Taymiyyah said in Al-Wabilus Sayyib that: "Whoever seeks guidance istikhara from Allah, consults with people, and is steadfast in his work, will never regret it."

Ibn Al-Qayyim in Zad al-Ma'ad (2/442), "He compensated them with this supplication – the Du`a of Istikharah – which reflects the concept of Tawhid, desperate need of Allah’s help, servitude to Him, putting one’s trust in Him and seeking help from the One in Whose hand is all goodness, for no one could grant all that is good except Him, and no one can avert all that is bad except Him, for He is the One Who, if he opens the door of mercy to His slave, no one will be able to withhold it from him except Him, and if He withholds [mercy], no one will be able to make it reach him by any means, such as augury [bird omens], astrology, horoscopes and the like. This supplication [Istikharah] is the “good omen” of the blessed and guided, for whom Allah has already decreed the best reward, and it is not the “omen” of the people of shirk, doom and failure, who associated other gods with Allah; but they will come to know. This supplication [Istikharah] implies affirmation of the existence of Allah, may He be Glorified; affirmation of His perfect attributes, such as His perfect knowledge, power and will; affirmation of His Lordship, delegating one’s affairs to Him, seeking His help, putting one’s trust in Him, turning away from relying on one’s own means, declaring that there is no power and no strength except with Him, acknowledging one’s failure to know what is good for oneself and to attain it, and acknowledging that that is all in the hand of one’s Protector, Creator and true God." He also said in the book Shifa al-A'lil, "What is destined is surrounded by two things: seeking guidance (doing istikhara) before it, and being content after it."

Al-Ghazali says in Ihya’ `Ulum Ad-Din (1/206): "Some wise men say that whoever is inspired to do four things will not be deprived of four things: whoever is inspired to give thanks will not be deprived of more [of Allah’s bounty]; whoever is inspired to repent will not be deprived of his repentance being accepted; whoever is inspired to pray Istikharah will not be deprived of a good outcome; and whoever is inspired to seek the advice of others will not be deprived of reaching the right decision."

== In popular culture and liturature ==
- Saib Tabrizi used the word Istikhara in one of his poetries.
- The Divân of Hafez includes a poem named "bah azm tobeh sahar goftam estekhareh konam" (bah azm tobeh sahar goftam estekhareh konam (I decided to repent at dawn and said Istikharah).
- Tebyan Stories (2017) includes a short film named "Istikhara" directed by Farajollah Salahshoor.
- 2015 Pakistani drama series Khuda Dekh Raha Hai is made based on the concept of Istikhara.
- Teri Raza, a 2017 Pakistani triangle romantic drama series, which revolves around the deep consequences of an istikhara.
- In 28 November 2022, Mishari bin Rashid Alafasy has released a short drama video (in music video style without music) reciting the supplication in his official youtube channel.
- Istikhara New York - A 2022 American short film which follows Reza, a 20-year-old working as a food delivery courier in New York City to make ends meet, aspiring to be Broadway actor.
- Urdu poet Amir Ameer has a popular poetry "Agar Ye Keh Do Baghair Mere" (If you say without me) contains the last 4 verse including the word and topic of istikhara.

== See also ==
- Moderation in Islam
- Shura
- Maslaha
- Ashtamangala prasnam
