= Kempa Airport =

- IATA: none; ICAO: FZBG

Summary
- Airport type: Closed
- Serves: Kempa
- Elevation AMSL: 1,148 ft / 350 m
- Coordinates: 2°57′15″S 18°22′45″E

Map
- Location of the airport in Democratic Republic of the Congo

Runways
Direction	Length		Surface
Direction	ft	m	Surface
Closed
- Sources: GCM Google Maps

Kempa Airport (ICAO: FZBG) was an airstrip serving the village of Kempa in Mai-Ndombe Province, Democratic Republic of the Congo.

Google Earth Historical Imagery shows increasing shrub growth on the runway since (6/15/2009).

Bokoro Airport is 8 kilometres (5.0 mi) north of Kempa.

== See also ==
- Transport in the Democratic Republic of the Congo
- List of airports in the Democratic Republic of the Congo
