= Mami Uchiseto =

Japanese volleyball player (born 1991)

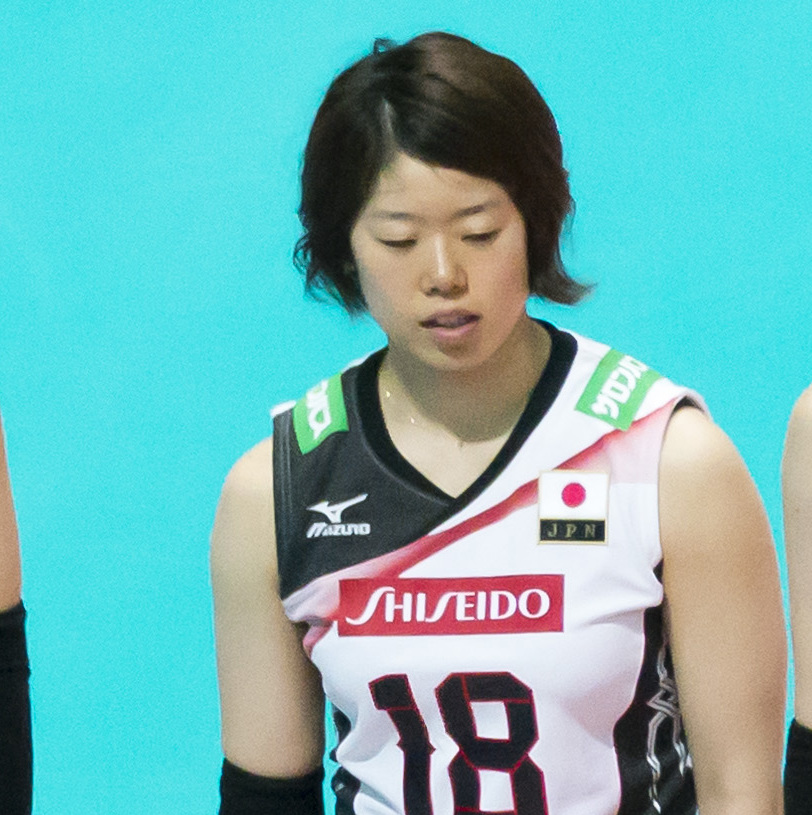

Personal information
- Full name: Mami Uchiseto
- Nickname: Mami
- Born: October 25, 1991 (age 35); Nobeoka, Miyazaki, Japan
- Height: 1.71 m (5 ft 7 in)
- Weight: 70 kg (150 lb)
- Spike: 296 cm (117 in)
- Block: 285 cm (112 in)

Volleyball information
- Position: Wing Spiker
- Current club: Korea Expressway Corporation Hi-Pass
- Number: 2 (national); 9 (club)

National team
2014–present	Japan
Honours
Representing Japan
World Grand Prix
Silver medal – second place	2014 Tokyo	Team
Asian Championship
Gold medal – first place	2017 Philippines	Team

Mami Uchiseto (内瀬戸 真実, Uchiseto Mami; born 25 October 1991) is a Japanese volleyball player who played for Saitama Ageo Medics in the V.League 1. She is part of the Japan women's national volleyball team.

== Clubs ==
- (Japan) Nobeoka Gakuen High School (2007–2010)
- (Japan) National Institute of Fitness and Sports (2010–2014)
- (Japan) Hitachi Rivale (2013–2017)
- (Italy) Pallavolo Hermaea (2017–2018)
- (Japan) Toyota Auto Body Queenseis (2018–2020)
- (Japan) Saitama Ageo Medics (2020–2023, 2025-2026)
- (South Korea) Korea Expressway Corporation Hi-Pass (2026–present)

== Awards ==
=== Individual ===
- 2014 Kurowashiki Tournament - Best Newcomer
- 2017 FIVB Volleyball Women's World Grand Champions Cup - Best Receiver

=== Club ===
- 2015/16 V.Premier League - Runner-up, with Hitachi Rivale
- 2016/17 V.Premier League - Bronze medal, with Hitachi Rivale
- 2018/19 Empress Cup - Runner-up, with Toyota Auto Body Queenseis
- 2020/21 V-Cup - Champion, with Saitama Ageo Medics

=== National team ===
- (Switzerland) 2014 Montreux Volley Masters - 6th place
- (Japan) 2014 FIVB World Grand Prix - Silver medal
- (Japan) 2015 FIVB World Cup – 5th place
- (United States) 2015 FIVB World Grand Prix - 6th place
- (Thailand) 2016 FIVB World Grand Prix - 9th place
- (China) 2017 FIVB World Grand Prix - 7th place
- (Japan) 2017 FIVB World Grand Champions Cup - 5th place
- (Philippines) 2017 Asian Championship - Champion
- (China) 2018 FIVB Nations League - 10th place
- (Japan) 2018 FIVB World Championship - 6th place
- (China) 2019 FIVB Nations League - 9th place
