= Moderation in Islam =

Approach to middle ground in Islam

In Islam, wasat (moderation) is one of the most basic terms and deliberately used topics. In the sense of shariah, it is a central characteristic of Islamic creed and has been used from the very beginning of Islam. It refers to a justly balanced way of life, avoiding extremes and experiencing things in moderation.

== Etymology ==
Wasat, also called wasatiyyah (وسط, وسطية) is the Arabic word for best, middle, centered, balanced, middle way or moderation in the Islamic context, meanwhile Qasd and Iqtisad are other terms for moderation in Islam, which mean "right way," "middle way," and "honest, truthful way."

== In scripture ==
=== In Quran ===
==== As Wasat ====
Bangladeshi Islamic scholar Abdul Hi Muhammad Saifullah and Nouman Ali Khan said, there are 286 verses in Surah Baqarah of the Quran, it is 143 if divided by 2, Surah Baqarah verse 143 contains the word moderation (wasat(-an)), which is a miracle of the Quran.

And thus we have made you a wasat (moderate) community, that you will be witnesses over the people and the Messenger will be a witness over you. And We did not make the qiblah which you used to face except that We might make evident who would follow the Messenger from who would turn back on his heels. And indeed, it is difficult except for those whom Allah has guided. And never would Allah have caused you to lose your faith. Indeed Allah is, to the people, Kind and Merciful.

— Al-Baqara 2:143

== In hadiths ==
=== As wasat ===
In a hadith, Islamic prophet Muhammad is purported as saying that, the meaning of wasat (moderation) in verse 2:143 of Quran is adl (justice).

=== As sadad, qasd or iqtisad, and ittidal ===
Abu Huraira reported: The Prophet (sallallaahu alayhi wa sallam) said, “The religion (of Islam) is easy, and whoever makes the religion a rigour, it will overpower him. So, follow a middle course (in worship); if you can’t do this, do something near to it and give glad tidings and seek help (of Allah) at morn and at dusk and some part of night”.

— Bukhari:39

== See also ==
- Salat al-Istikharah
- Shura
- Al-Kahf - the midst Sura of Quran.
- Mizan
