= Islamic inheritance jurisprudence =

Inheritance in Islam

Islamic Inheritance jurisprudence is a field of Islamic jurisprudence (Arabic: فقه) that deals with inheritance, a topic that is prominently dealt with in the Qur'an. It is often called Mīrāth (Arabic: ميراث, literally "inheritance"), and its branch of Islamic law is technically known as ʿilm al-farāʾiḍ (Arabic: علم الفرائض, "the science of the ordained quotas").

== Inheritance and the Qur'an ==
The Qur'an introduced additional heirs that were not entitled inheritance in pre-Islamic times, mentioning nine relatives specifically of which six were female and three were male. The laws of inheritance in the Qur'an also included other male relatives, such as the husband and half-brothers from the mother's side, who were excluded from inheritance in old customs. The heirs mentioned in the Qur'an are the mother, father, husband, wife, daughter, brother who shares the same mother, full sister, sister who shares the same mother, and consanguine sister.

In general, the Qur'an improved the status of women by identifying their share of inheritance in clear terms. It also completely forbade the practice of inheriting widows.^{[4:19]} Orientalist Joseph Schacht states that "this is not meant as a regular legal ordinance, but is part of the Qur'anic endeavor to improve the position of women." The Qur'an does not explicitly mention the shares of male relatives, such as the decedent's son, but provides the rule that the son's share must be twice that of the daughter's. Muslim theologians explain this aspect of inheritance by looking at Islamic law in its entirety, which bestows the responsibility and accountability on men to provide safety, protection and sustenance to women.^{[Qur'an 4:34]}. One explanation of why a daughter is entitled to only half that of the son is that Islam decrees that women, upon marriage are entitled to a "dowry" from the husband (in addition to any provision by her parents). It is thereafter the husband's obligation to care for and maintain his wife and the "dowry" is, therefore, essentially an advance of inheritance rights from her husband's estate.

Before the revelation of the verses containing the above changes^{[Qur'an, 4:11-12, 4:176]}, the Qur'an used to require Muslims to write down a will detailing how they wish to dispose of their entire property.^{[Qur'an, 2:180–182, 2:240, 4:33, 5:106–107]} Nonetheless, in the now optional will, called waṣeyya, Muslims are allowed to give out a maximum of one third of their property, while the rest will be divided according to the verses of inheritance, after all debt, should there be any, be relieved, as most Jurists now agree that the verses of waṣeyya has been abrogated by the verses of inheritance.

Muslims are also encouraged to give money to the orphans and poor if they are present during the division of property. ^{[Qur'an, 4:8]}

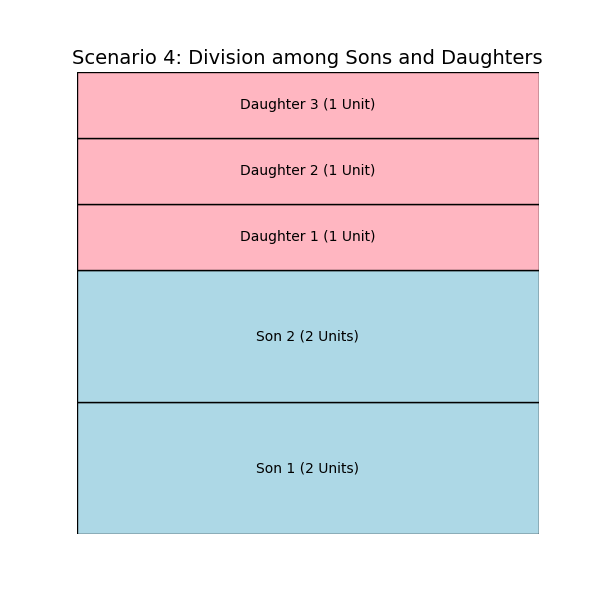
Scenario 4 Islamic Inheritance Division among Sons and Daughter

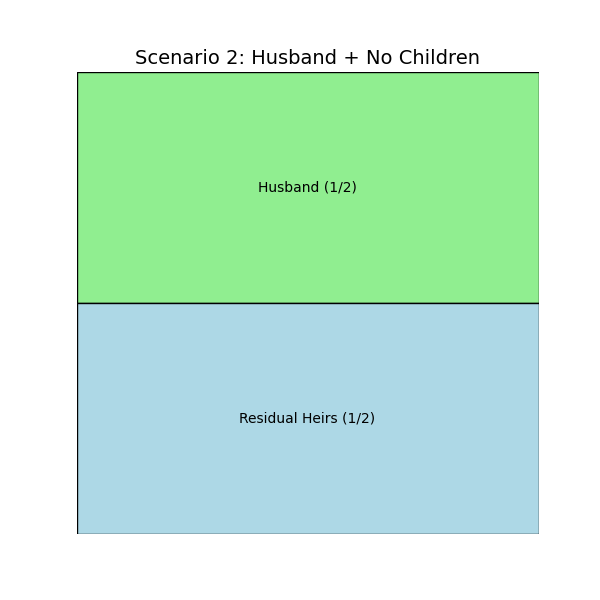
Scenario 2 Islamic Inheritance Husband + No Children

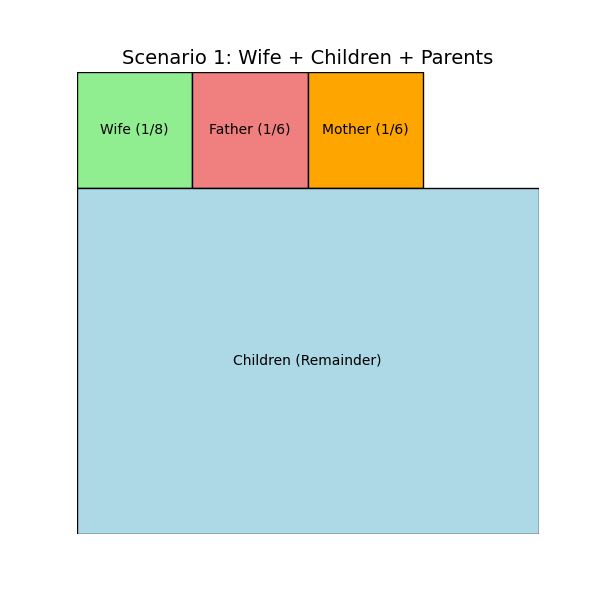
Scenario 1 Islamic Inheritance Wife+ Children + Parents

== Later development ==
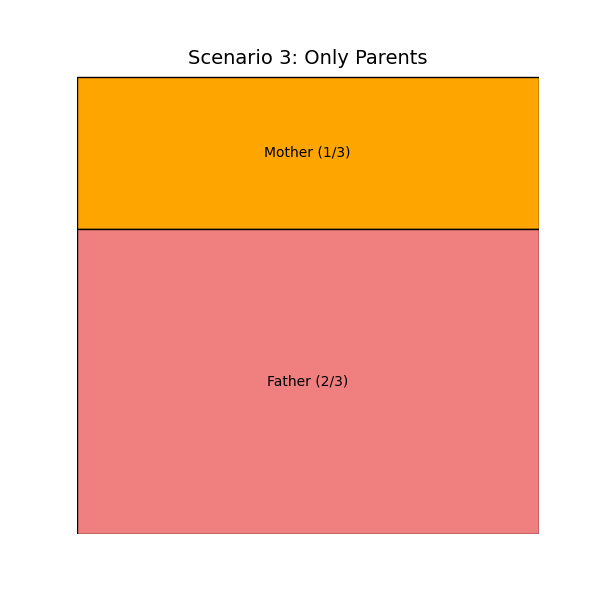
Scenario 4 Islamic Inheritance Only Parents Alive

The Qur'an contains only three verses ^{[4:11, 4:12 and 4:176]} that give specific details of inheritance and shares, in addition to few verses dealing with testamentary power. It has also been reported in Hadith that Muhammad allotted great importance to the laws of inheritance and ordered his followers to learn and teach them. Muslim jurists used these verses as a starting point to expound the laws of inheritance even further using Hadith, as well as methods of juristic reasoning, like Qiyas. In later periods, large volumes of work have been written on the subject.

This amalgamation of old agnatic customs and Islamic law led to a number of problems and controversies that Muslim jurists have solved in different ways. Through the use of deductive reasoning (Qiyas), Muslim jurists added three additional heirs: the paternal grandfather, maternal grandmother, and agnatic granddaughter. These heirs, if entitled to inherit, are given their fixed shares and the remaining estate is inherited by the residuaries (ʿaṣaba). This led to some minor differences between jurisprudence schools of the Sunni maddhabs. Also, the laws of inheritance for Twelver Shia, despite being based on the same principles, differ in a number of features due to the rejection of certain accounts of Hadith and based on their understanding of certain events in early Islam. On the other hand, the system of inheritance of the Kharajite Ibadis and Zaidis closely resemble that of the Sunni system. In modern Muslim countries, usually a mixture of different schools of jurisprudence (including Shia) is in effect, in addition to a number of important reforms to the traditional system. The main achievements of such modern systems was the codification of inheritance laws.

== Details of inheritance in Islamic law ==
Inheritance is considered as an integral part of Shariah Law. Muslims inherit from one another as stated in the Qur'an.^{[Qur'an 4:7]} Hence, there is a legal share for relatives of the decedent in his estate and property. The major rules of inheritance are detailed in Qur'an, Hadith and Fiqh.

When a Muslim dies there are four duties that need to be performed. They are:

1. Pay funeral and burial expenses.
2. Paying debts of the deceased.
3. Determine the value / will of the deceased if any (which is capped to one third of the estate as the remainder is decided by shariah law).
4. Distribute the remainder of estate and property to the relatives of the deceased according to Shariah Law.

Therefore, it is necessary to determine the relatives of the deceased who are entitled to inherit, and their shares.

These laws take greater prominence in Islam because of the restrictions placed on the testator (a person who makes a will). Islamic law places the following types of restrictions on the testator.

1. Which persons they can bequeath their wealth to.
2. The amount that they can bequeath (which must not exceed one third of the deceased's estate).

=== Different types of heirs ===
Heirs referred to as primary heirs are always entitled to a share of the inheritance; they are never totally excluded. These primary heirs consist of the spouse relict, both parents, the son(s) and the daughter(s). All remaining heirs can be totally excluded by the presence of other heirs. But under certain circumstances, other heirs can also inherit as residuaries, namely the father, paternal grandfather, daughter, agnatic granddaughter, full sister, consanguine sister, and mother. Those who inherit are usually categorized into three groups:

1. Quota-heirs (dhawu al-farāʾḍ), This group includes four males and eight females. The male quota-heirs are the husband, father, paternal grandfather and maternal brother. The female quota-heirs are the wife, daughter, granddaughter, mother, grandmother, full sister, paternal sister and maternal sister. Nevertheless, there are scenarios that could move the daughter, granddaughter, father, grandfather, full siblings and paternal siblings to the second group ('asaba).
2. Members of the ʿaṣaba (residuaries), usually a combination of male (and sometimes female) relatives that inherit as residuaries after the shares of the Quota-heirs is distributed.
3. Extended family members (dhawu al arham): This includes any blood relative who is not a quot-heir or 'asaba (residuary). Examples include maternal grandfather, aunts, nieces and female cousins.

=== Process of inheritance ===
Inheritance is distributed in the following order:

1. All quota-heirs are allocated their shares. If this exhausts the property, the process completes. Otherwise, go to next step.
2. Residuary heirs get the remainder of the property.
3. If there are no residuaries, but there is a balance from step (1), then the money is redistributed proportionally to the quota-heirs. This process is called (al rad).
4. If there are no quota-heirs and no residuary heirs, then the property is distributed to extended family members.
5. If there are no quota-heirs, no residuary heirs, and no extended heirs, then the property escheats to the state treasury, Bayt al-mal.

The classical position of the Maliki and Shafi'i schools is that if there are no quota or residuary heirs, the property directly goes to the state treasury, i.e. steps (3) and (4) are skipped. Both schools later joined the Hanafi and Hanbali schools in adopting the above five steps due to the absence or disorganization of Bayt al-mal.

=== Rules of inclusion and exclusion ===
In Islamic law, only relatives with a legitimate blood relationship to the deceased are entitled to inherit. Thus, illegitimate children and adopted children have no shares in inheritance. In general, a full brother will exclude a half-brother who shares a common father ("consanguine" brother), but not a half-brother who shares a common mother. In cases where a deceased man leaves a pregnant woman, the unborn child's share will be reserved. Also a woman during the time of waiting (ʿiddat) after divorce is considered a wife of the deceased for purposes of inheritance.

There are even further rules of exclusion and inclusion of different relatives. The only "practical situations" that may cause disqualification are differences of religion and homicide. But schools of Islamic jurisprudence differed whether a Muslim can inherit from a non-Muslim or not. All the jurists agree that intentional or unjustifiable killing would exclude a person from inheritance.

=== Women and inheritance ===
In Islam, women are entitled the right of inheritance, though generally, Islam allots women half the share of inheritance available to men if they inherit from the same father. For example, where the decedent has both male and female children, a son's share is double that of a daughter's. There are other circumstances where women might receive equal shares to men. For example, the share of the mother and father of a decedent who leaves children behind. Also the share of a brother who shares the same mother is equal to the share of a sister who shares the same mother, as do the shares of their descendants.

There are some who say women are entitled to equal inheritance in Islam. In seventeenth century Ottoman cities, such as Bursa, inheritance issues were commonly resolved in courts, with the defendants even being family members of women that were suing them.

Sometimes, women get double the share as that of men; for example, if there are only parents and a husband, the husband will receive half, the father gets 1/6 and the mother gets 2/6. This is according to Ibn Abbas's interpretation of verses 11, 12 of Surah An-Nisa. ^{[Quran 4:11,12]}

Even the Qur'an does distinguish between men and women in cases of kalalah relation. Kalalah describes a person who leaves behind neither parents nor children; it also means all the relatives of a deceased except his parents and children, and it also denotes the relationships that are not through [the deceased's] parents or children. Islamic scholars hold that the original reasons for these differences are the responsibilities that are allotted to spouses. A husband in Islam must use his inheritance to support his family while a wife has no support obligations. Additionally, Arab society traditionally practiced the custom of bride price or dower rather than dowry; i.e., the man paid a gift to his wife or her family upon marriage, rather than the opposite, placing a financial burden on men where none existed on women. This custom was continued but changed materially by Islam. The divine injunction stipulated that the dowry (mahr) is due to the wife only not her family. It can also be deferred thereby reducing the burden if the husband is unable to afford the requested dowry at the time of the marriage. The wife can defer it till a stipulated date or it can become a debt on the estate when the husband dies.^{[Quran 4:5]}

And give their dowries willingly to women (as an obligation), but if they, of their own accord, remit a portion of the dowry, you may enjoy it with pleasure.[18]

== The role of Islamic inheritance in the development of Islamic mathematics ==
The Islamic law of inheritance served as an impetus behind the development of algebra (derived from the Arabic al-jabr) by Muhammad ibn Mūsā al-Khwārizmī and other medieval Islamic mathematicians. Al-Khwārizmī's Hisab al-jabr w’al-muqabala, the foundational text of algebra, devoted its third and longest chapter to solving problems related to Islamic inheritance using algebra. He formulated the rules of inheritance as linear equations, hence his knowledge of quadratic equations was not required.

Al-Hassār, a mathematician from the Maghreb (North Africa) specializing in Islamic inheritance jurisprudence during the 12th century, developed the modern symbolic mathematical notation for fractions, where the numerator and denominator are separated by a horizontal bar. The "dust ciphers he used are also nearly identical to the digits used in the current Western Arabic numerals. These same digits and fractional notation appear soon after in the work of Fibonacci in the 13th century.

In the 15th century, Abū al-Hasan ibn Alī al-Qalasādī, a specialist in Islamic inheritance jurisprudence, used characters from the Arabic alphabet as a mathematical notation system in algebraic equations.

== See also ==
- Women and Islam
- Mathematics in medieval Islam
