= Pallavolo Hermaea =

Italian women's volleyball club

Volley Hermaea Olbia
- Full name: Volley Hermaea Olbia
- Founded: 1980
- Ground: Geopalace, Olbia, Italy (Capacity: 3,000)
- Chairman: Pier Giorgio Marcelli
- Website: Club home page

Uniforms
Home	Away

Volley Hermaea is an Italian women's volleyball club based in Olbia.

== Previous names ==
Due to sponsorship, the club have competed under the following names:

- Gruppo Sportivo Avis Olbia (1980–1983)
- Pallavolo Hermaea Olbia (1983–....)
- Volley Hermaea Olbia (....–2012)
- Sartel Olbia (2012–2013)
- Angeli del Fango Olbia (2013–2014)
- Entu Olbia (2014–2017)
- Golem Olbia (2017–2018)
- Volley Hermaea Olbia (2018–2019)
- Geovillage Hermaea Olbia (2019–2021)
- Volley Hermaea Olbia (2021–2024)
- Resinglass Olbia (2024–2025)

== History ==
The club was established in 1980 and was originally named Gruppo Sportivo Avis Olbia. It started competing in the lower divisions and reached the Serie D in 1983, the same year its name was changed to Pallavolo Hermaea. The club arrived at Serie B2 (in 2007), Serie B1 (in 2012) and Serie A2 (in 2014).

In July 2025, the club announced it would focus on its youth sectors and not participate in the 2025–26 season of Serie A2.

== Venue ==
Since 2013 the club plays its home matches at the Geopalace in Olbia. The venue has a 3,000 spectators capacity.

== Team ==
2017–2018 Team
Number	Player	Position	Height (m)	Weight (kg)	Birth date
1	(Italy) Carlotta Simoncini	Setter	1.77		2 November 1998 (age 27)
2	(Italy) Marianna Iannone	Outside Hitter	1.81		9 November 1996 (age 29)
3	(Japan) Mami Uchiseto	Outside Hitter	1.70	70	25 October 1991 (age 34)
7	(Italy) Natasha Spinello	Setter	1.73		15 December 1998 (age 27)
8	(Italy) Claudia Provaroni	Outside Hitter	1.80		14 May 1998 (age 28)
9	(Italy) Cristina Murru	Outside Hitter	1.62		22 September 2001 (age 24)
10	(Italy) Benedetta Bartolini	Middle Blocker	1.84		5 March 1999 (age 27)
11	(Hungary) Nikolett Soós	Opposite	1.85	78	17 October 1988 (age 37)
12	(Italy) Agnese Cecconello	Middle Blocker	1.88		6 November 1999 (age 26)
13	(Italy) Giulia Melli	Outside Hitter	1.85		8 January 1998 (age 28)
14	(Italy) Alice Barbagallo	Libero	1.68		24 April 1997 (age 29)
16	(Italy) Eleonora Caboni	Libero	1.72		18 June 1993 (age 33)
17	(Romania) Daiana Mureșan	Outside Hitter	1.91	75	6 July 1990 (age 35)
18	(Italy) Jenny Barazza	Middle Blocker	1.88	70	24 July 1981 (age 44)

2016–2017 Team
Number	Player	Position	Height (m)	Weight (kg)	Birth date
1	(Italy) Giulia Carraro	Setter	1.75		25 July 1994 (age 31)
2	(Italy) Francesca Trevisan	Outside Hitter	1.80		22 September 1995 (age 30)
3	(Italy) Emma Bateman	Setter	1.82		7 March 1995 (age 31)
4	(Italy) Lucrezia Formenti	Libero	1.75		4 March 1996 (age 30)
6	(Italy) Noura Mabilo	Middle Blocker	1.83		22 August 1996 (age 29)
8	(Italy) Marianna Maggipinto	Libero	1.64		5 January 1996 (age 30)
9	(Italy) Francesca Villani	Outside Hitter	1.87		30 May 1995 (age 31)
10	(Italy) Sirya Tangini	Middle Blocker	1.85		1 October 1997 (age 28)
11	(United States) AJ Whitaker	Middle Blocker	1.90		16 August 1992 (age 33)
12	(Italy) Giulia Angelina	Outside Hitter	1.92	89	26 February 1997 (age 29)
13	(Serbia) Ivana Radonjić	Outside Hitter	1.85		2 October 1991 (age 34)
14	(Italy) Marianna Iannone	Outside Hitter	1.80		9 November 1996 (age 29)
15	(Italy) Silvia Lotti	Outside Hitter	1.88	72	17 June 1992 (age 34)
18	(Italy) Eleonora Caboni	Libero	1.68		18 June 1993 (age 33)
