= Kalalah =

Term in Islamic estate inheritance

Kalālah (Arabic: كلالة) is a term in Islamic inheritance which refers to a someone that has an estate, but no direct ascendants or descendants. Abd al-Razzaaq narrated in al-Musannaf (10/301) from Ibn al-Musayyib that, "‘Umar ibn al-Khattaab wrote a document about the grandfather and kalaalah (issues of inheritance when a grandfather of the deceased was still living, or if the deceased left behind no children), and he continued to pray istikhaarah, saying, “O Allaah, if You know that there is some good in it then let it be.” Then when he was stabbed he called for the document, and erased it, and no one knew what was in it. He said: “I wrote something about the grandfather and kalaalah, and I prayed istikhaarah asking Allaah for guidance, then I decided to leave you as you are now.”

== Sources ==
- Steward, Devin (2002). "Muhammad B. Daud Al-Zahiri's Manual of Jurisprudence, Al-wusul ila marifat al-usul". In Benard G. Weiss (ed.). Studies in Islamic Legal Theory. Leiden: Brill. ISBN 90-04-12066-1.
