= Mizan =

Term in Islam

Mizan (Arabic: ميزان, lit. 'balance') is a concept in the Quran, which has been described as "the principle of the middle path" and "the overarching divine principle for organizing our universe". Azizah Y. al-Hibri argues that Mizan, as the "divine scale", could be transformed into Adl in human realm.

Mizan also refers to the unique rhythmic meter of the musical movements within the Andalusian Nubah genre.

== See also ==
- Moderation in Islam
