= Ardak Maratova =

Kazakhstani volleyball player (born 1994)

Personal information
- Nationality: Kazakhstani
- Born: 3 June 1994 (age 32)
- Height: 183 cm (72 in)
- Weight: 76 kg (168 lb)
- Spike: 275 cm (108 in)
- Block: 265 cm (104 in)

Volleyball information
- Number: 18 (national team)

Career
Years	Teams
2015	Zhetysu Almaty

National team
2015	Kazakhstan

Ardak Maratova (born 3 June 1994) is a Kazakhstani female volleyball player. She is part of the Kazakhstan women's national volleyball team.

She participated in the 2015 FIVB Volleyball World Grand Prix. On club level she played for Zhetysu Almaty in 2015.
