= Aliya Batkuldina =

Kazakhstani volleyball player (born 1995)

Personal information
- Nationality: Kazakhstani
- Born: 17 November 1995 (age 30)
- Height: 181 cm (71 in)
- Weight: 74 kg (163 lb)
- Spike: 273 cm (107 in)
- Block: 264 cm (104 in)

Volleyball information
- Number: 23 (national team)

Career
- Years: Team
- 2015: Astana

National team
- Years: Team
- 2015: Kazakhstan

Aliya Batkuldina is a Kazakh volleyball player. She is part of the Kazakhstan women's national volleyball team.

She participated in the 2015 FIVB Volleyball World Grand Prix. On club level she played for Astana in 2015.
