= Mina Roosta =

Iranian volleyball player (born 1993)

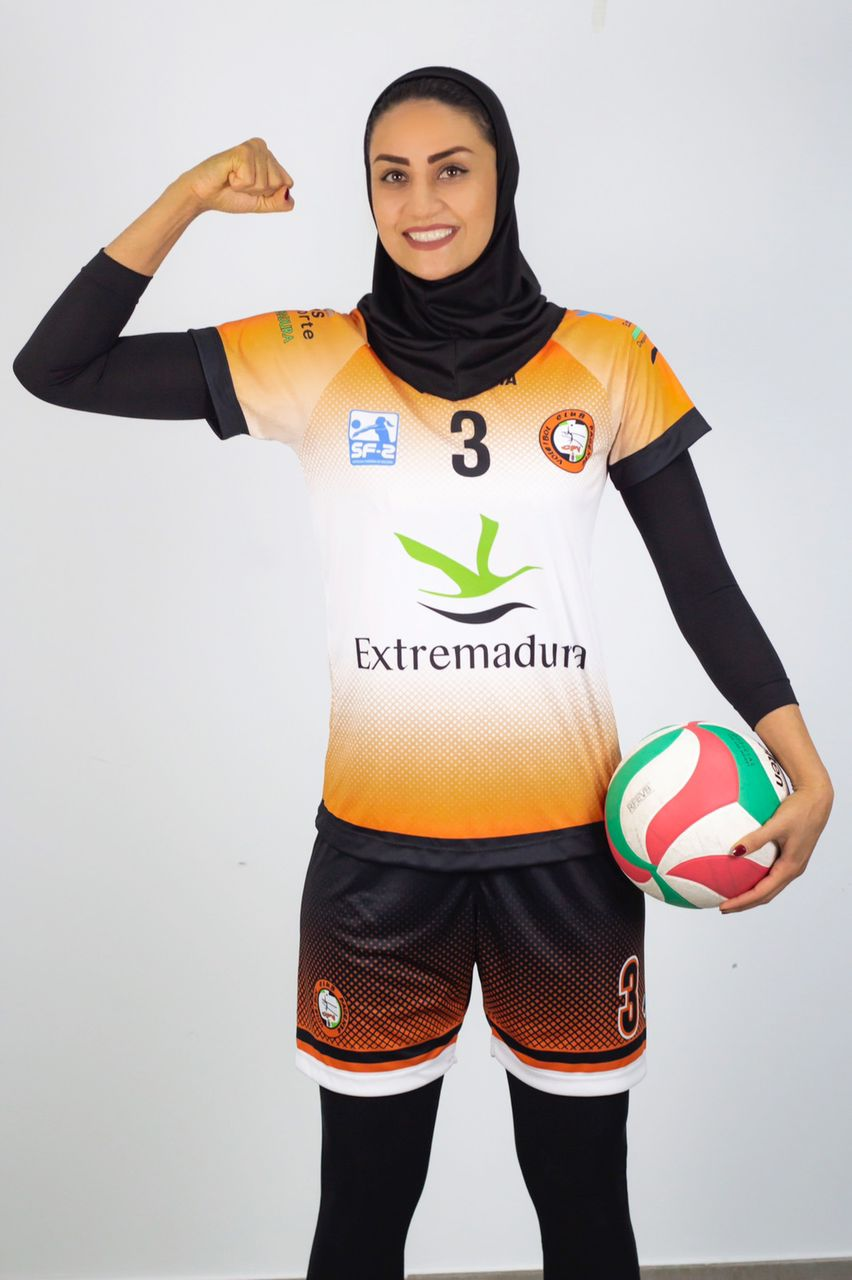

Personal information
- Full name: Mina Roosta
- Nationality: Iranian
- Born: 21 March 1993 (age 33); Shiraz, Iran
- Height: 1.78 m (5 ft 10 in)
- Weight: 69 kg (152 lb)
- Spike: 2.73 m (107 in)
- Block: 2.64 m (104 in)

Volleyball information
- Position: Middle Blocker
- Current club: (Iran) Zob Ahan Isfahan

Career
Years	Teams
2022-2023	Badajoz, Spain

National team
2022	Iran

Mina Roosta (born 21 March 1993) is an Iranian volleyball player who plays for the Iran women's national volleyball team.

Mina Roosta is referred to as "the best female sprinter of Iran". She was also part of the Iranian women's volleyball team in the 2020 Tokyo Olympic selection competition. The Spanish Badajoz Club entered the Spanish Volleyball League and the first Iranian female legionnaire won a league title in the Spanish League.

== Career ==
In 2015, she was part of Iran's semi-national team in the Asian under-23 tournament. In 2016, she was part of Iran's women's national volleyball team in the 19th Asia Championship women's volleyball tournament. The composition of the Iranian women's national volleyball team played in the world selection tournament in 2016.

== Club records ==
In 2016, on the eve of the start of the premier women's volleyball club league, Rosta joined Isfahan's Zob Ahan team.

=== Participation in the Spanish league ===
In 1400, the village entered the Spanish league by signing a contract with the Spanish Badajoz club and was named the first Iranian lady legionnaire in the Spanish league.

== Personal life ==
Mina Roosta is a graduate of Physiology of Physical Education. She is also in charge of the Women's Education Committee of Shiraz Volleyball Board.
