= Diana Kempa =

Kazakhstani volleyball player

Personal information
- Nationality: Kazakhstan
- Born: Diana Kavtorina; 30 December 1992 (age 33)
- Hometown: Temirtau, Karaganda, Kazakhstan
- Height: 1.67 m (5 ft 6 in)
- Weight: 56 kg (123 lb)
- Spike: 270 cm (110 in)
- Block: 275 cm (108 in)

Volleyball information
- Current club: Astana
- Number: 11

Career
Teams
	(Kazakhstan) Pavlodar

National team
Kazakhstan

Diana Kempa (born Diana Kavtorina; 30 December 1992) is a Kazakhstani female volleyball player. She is a member of the Kazakhstan women's national volleyball team. She was part of the Kazakhstani national team at the 2015 FIVB World Grand Prix, 2017 FIVB Volleyball World Grand Prix, and 2017 Asian Women's Volleyball Championship.

== Clubs ==
- (Kazakhstan) Pavlodar (2015-present)
