= Mona Derismahmoudi =

Iranian volleyball player

Mona Derismahmoudi (born April 21, 1993, in Isfahan, Iran) is a player of the Iranian women's national volleyball team. She has a record of playing for the Zob Ahan Isfahan team and winning the Iranian Super League championship with them. She plays as a middle blocker. Mona has studied accounting at Isfahan University and has been a member of the Iranian national team under 23 years old. She achieved the seventh and fifth place with the national team in the Asian Nations Cup in 2019 and 2023, respectively. Furthermore, She has a record of playing for Boavista Club in Portugal.

== Honours ==
=== National team ===
- 2023 Asian Women's Volleyball Challenge Cup: 5th place

=== Club ===
- Iranian Super League
  - Champions (1): 2016 (Zob Ahan)
