= Neda Chamlanian =

Iranian volleyball player

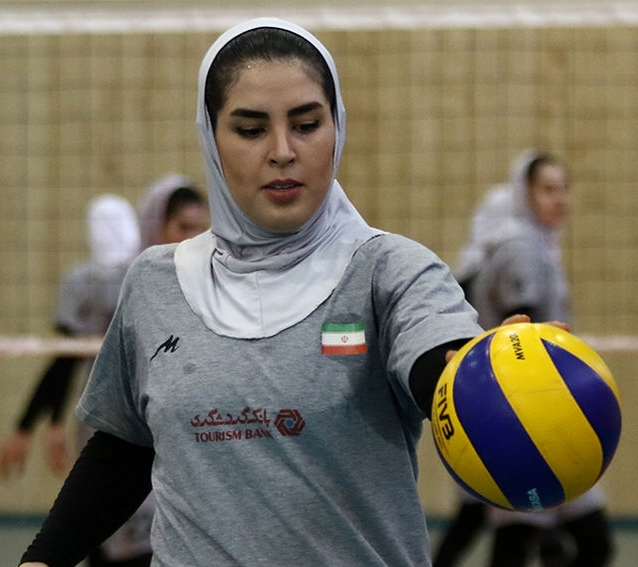

Personal information
- Born: March 7, 1994 (age 32); Isfahan, Iran
- Height: 1.83 m (6 ft 0 in)
- Weight: 75 kg (165 lb)
- Spike: 2.92 m (115 in)
- Block: 2.82 m (111 in)

Volleyball information
- Position: opposite diagonal
- Current club: saipa
- Number: 9

National team
| Iran women's national volleyball team |

Neda Chamlanian (Persian: ندا چملانیان, born 7 March 1994) is an Iranian volleyball player from Iran women's national volleyball team who plays for the Women's National Team and Saipa Cultural and Sport Club. She is in the position of opposite diagonal.
