= Kariya Stadium =

Baseball stadium in Kariya, Aichi, Japan

- 刈谷球場
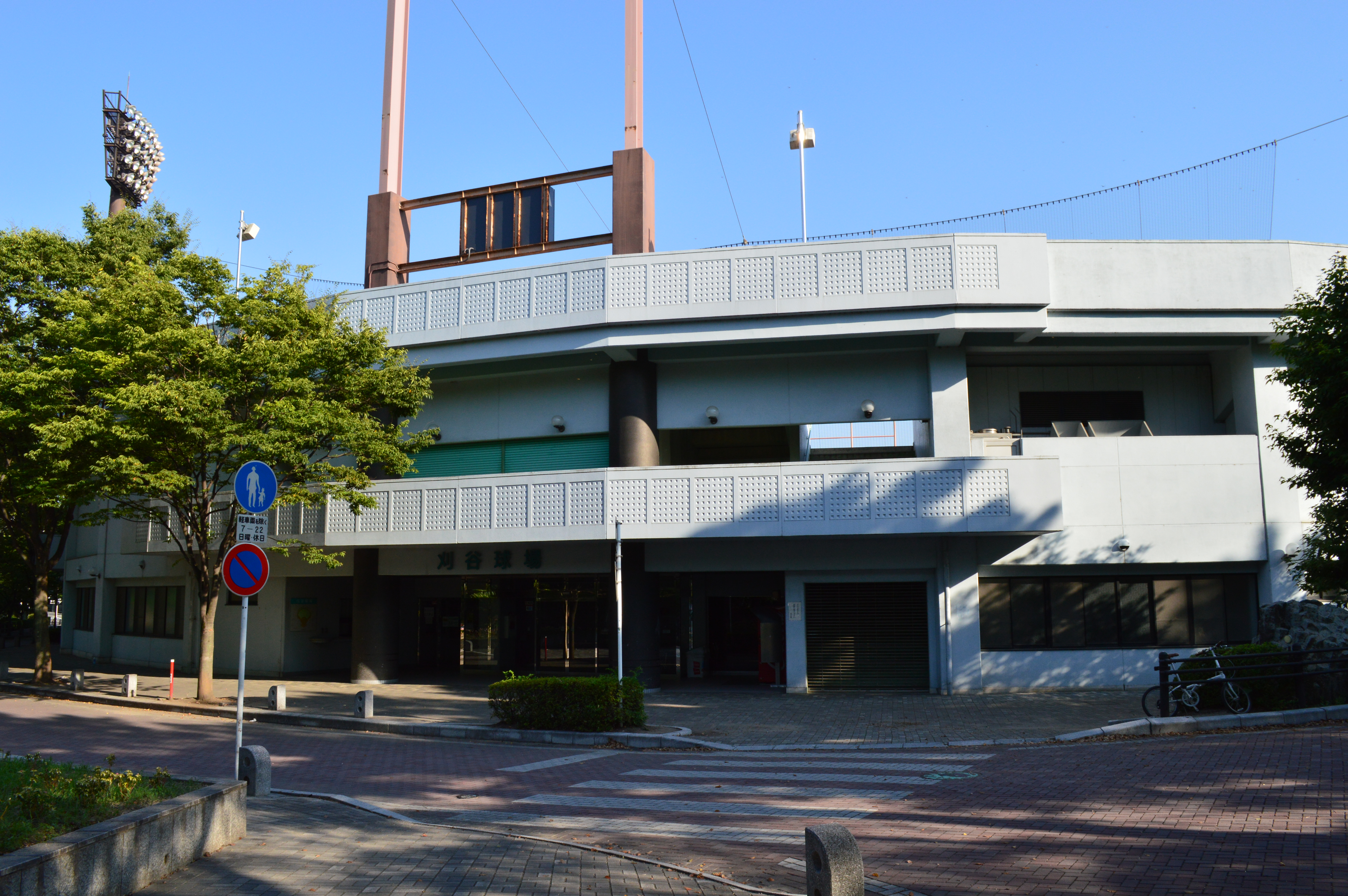

- Location within Aichi Prefecture Location within Japan
- Location: Kariya, Aichi, Japan
- Coordinates: 34°59′14.9″N 136°59′3.08″E
- Owner: Kariya City
- Capacity: 10,000

Construction
- Opened: 1950

Website
- Official site

Kariya Stadium (刈谷球場) is a baseball stadium in the city of Kariya, Aichi Prefecture, Japan. It was also used as an Association football stadium until 1994.

It hosted the 1950 Emperor's Cup final game between All Kwangaku and Keio University, which was played there on June 4, 1950.

In 1964, lighting was installed to support nighttime activities.
