= Kariya, Aichi =

Kariya 刈谷市
- City
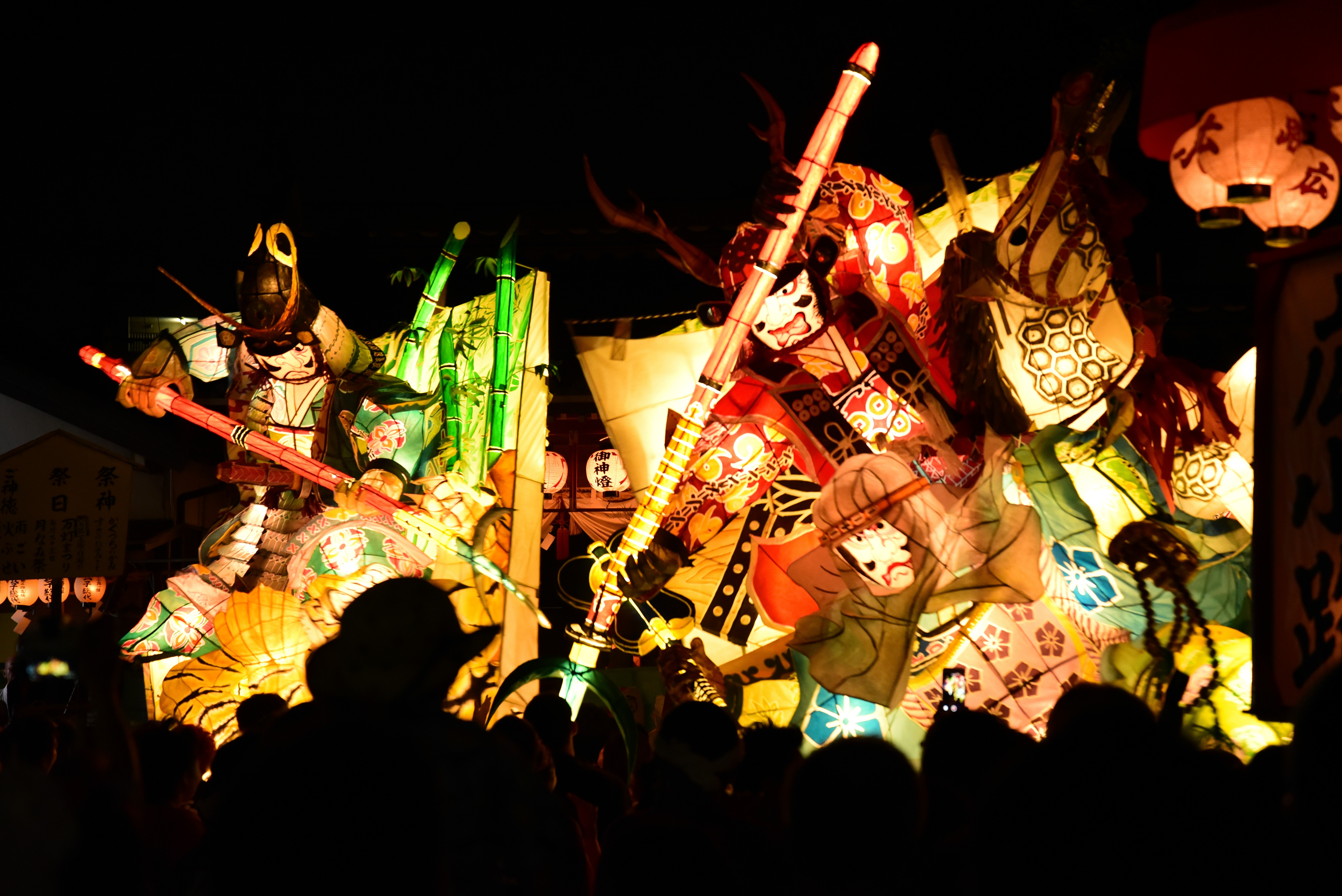
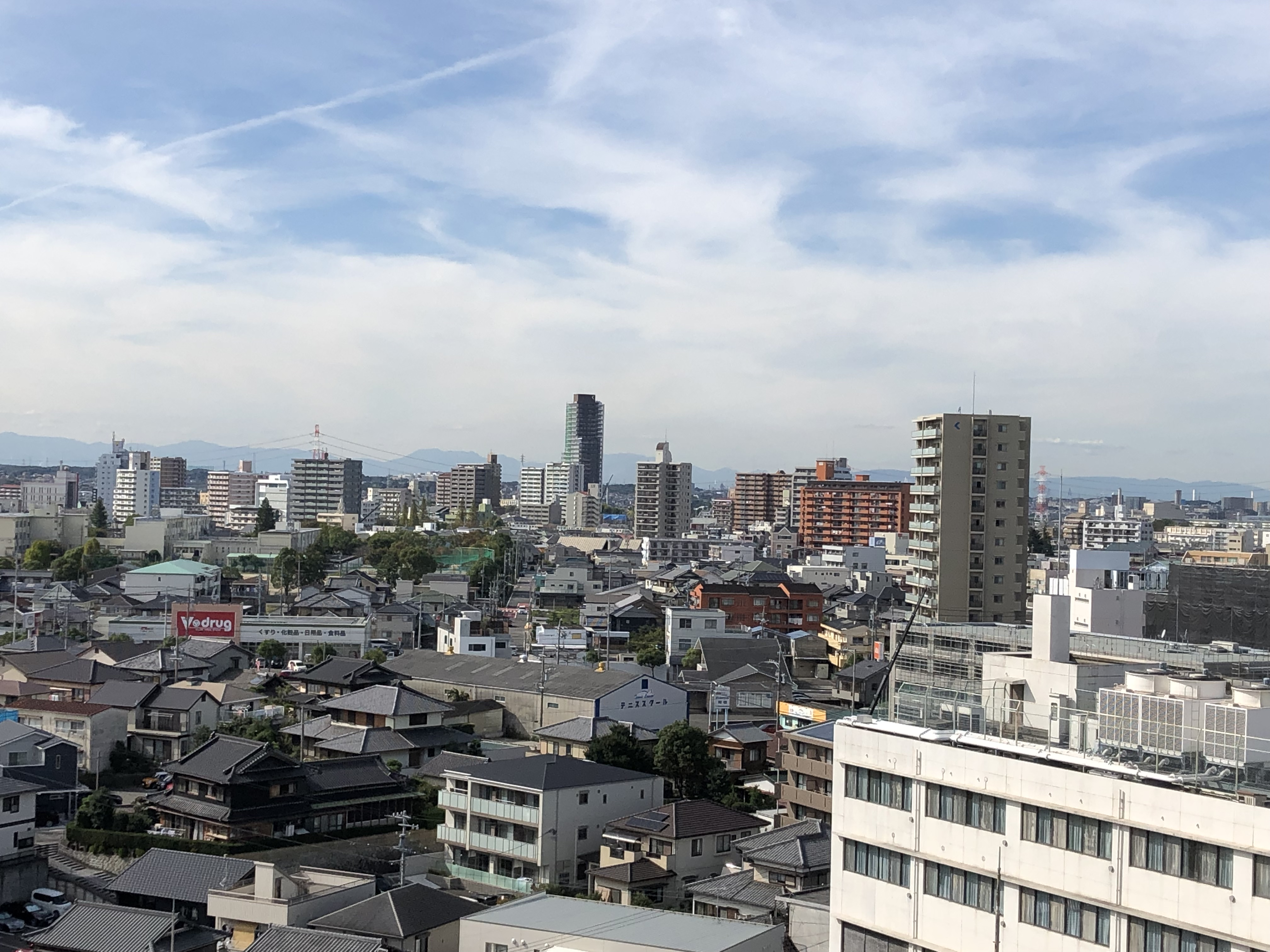
- Upper stage：Mando Matsuri; Lower stage：Skyline of Kariya City

- Flag Seal

- Location of Kariya in Aichi Prefecture

- Coordinates: 34°59′21.4″N 137°0′7.7″E
- Country: Japan
- Region: Chūbu (Tōkai)
- Prefecture: Aichi

Government

Area
  - Total: 50.39 km^{2} (19.46 sq mi)

Population (October 1, 2019)
  - Total: 153,162
  - Density: 3,040/km^{2} (7,872/sq mi)
- Time zone: UTC+9 (Japan Standard Time)
- Tree: Camphor laurel
- Flower: Iris laevigata
- Phone number: 0566-23-1111
- Address: 1-1 Tōyōchō, Kariya-shi, Aichi-ken 448-8501
- Website: Official website

Kariya (刈谷市, Kariya-shi) is a city in central Aichi Prefecture, Japan. As of 1 October 2019, the city had an estimated population of 153,162 in 66,751 households, and a population density of 3,040 persons per km^{2}. The total area of the city is 50.39 square kilometres (19.46 sq mi).

== Geography ==
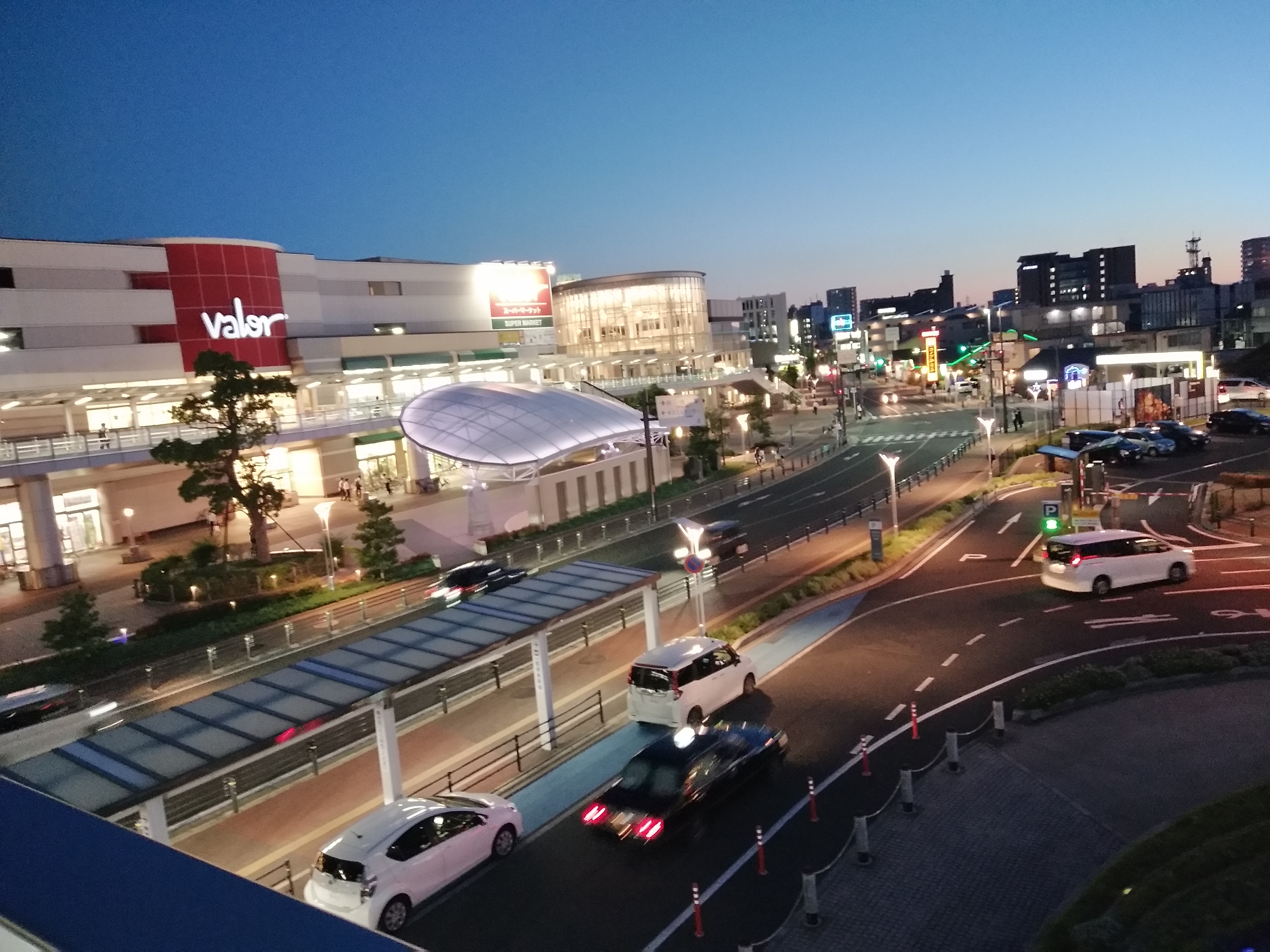
Downtown of Kariya City

Kariya is situated in central Aichi Prefecture, on the Mikawa side of the border between former Owari Province and Mikawa Province. The area is flat and well-watered, with an average elevation of less than 10 meters above sea level.

=== Climate ===
The city has a climate characterized by hot and humid summers, and relatively mild winters (Köppen climate classification Cfa). The average annual temperature in Aisai is 15.7 °C. The average annual rainfall is 1578 mm with September as the wettest month. The temperatures are highest on average in August, at around 27.9 °C, and lowest in January, at around 4.4 °C.

=== Demographics ===
Per Japanese census data, the population of Kariya has grown steadily over the past 70 years.

Historical population
Year	Pop.	±%
1950	50,384	—
1960	59,235	+17.6%
1970	87,672	+48.0%
1980	105,643	+20.5%
1990	120,126	+13.7%
2000	132,054	+9.9%
2010	145,744	+10.4%

=== Neighboring municipalities ===
Aichi Prefecture

- Anjō
- Chiryū
- Higashiura
- Miyoshi
- Ōbu
- Takahama
- Tōgō
- Toyoake
- Toyota

== History ==
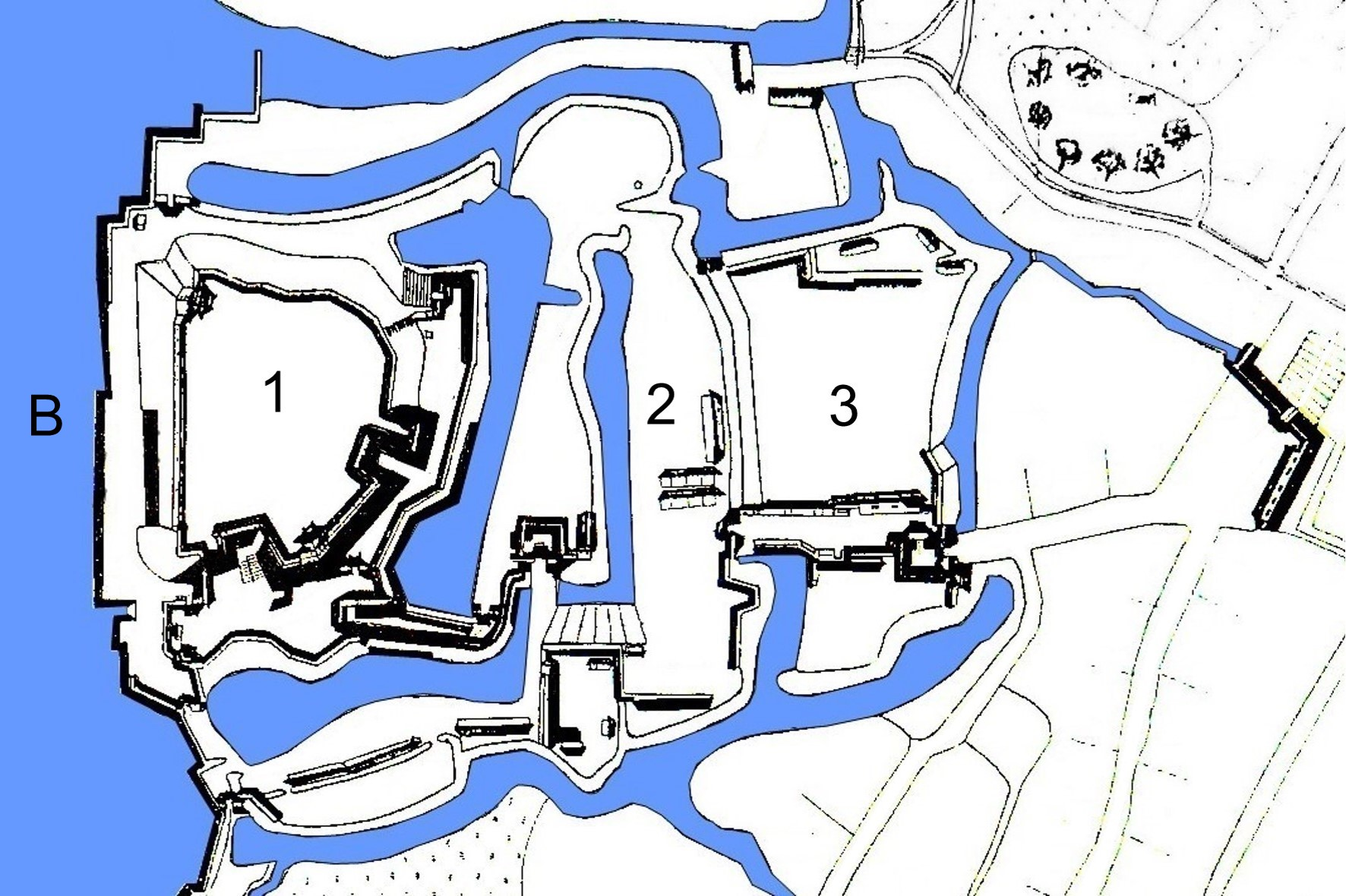
Kariya castle

=== Feudal period ===
Kariya was a castle town in the Sengoku period, in an area contested between the Imagawa clan, Oda clan and various local warlords, including the Mizuno clan and Matsudaira clan.

=== Early modern period ===
Tokugawa Ieyasu’s maternal grandfather Mizuno Tadamasa rebuilt Kariya Castle in the mid-16th century. The Mizuno clan shifted allegiances adroitly between the Imagawa clan to Oda Nobunaga and to Toyotomi Hideyoshi, who relocated the clan to Ise Province.

However, Mizuno Katsunari, the grandson of Tadamasa was allowed to return to the clan's ancestral territories by Ieyasu after the Battle of Sekigahara as daimyō of Kariya Domain, a feudal han under the Tokugawa shogunate. The domain was reassigned to numerous clans during the Edo period, but was retained by the Doi clan from 1734 until the Meiji Restoration.

=== Late modern period ===
After the Meiji Restoration, Kariya Town was created within Hekikai District, Aichi Prefecture with the establishment of the modern municipalities system on October 1, 1889. The town prospered as a center for commerce, sake production, sericulture and ceramics due to its location on the main railway routes. The Yosami Transmitting Station, located in Kariya, was Japan's tallest structure when completed in 1929.

=== Contemporary history ===
Kariya achieved city status on April 1, 1950. The city expanded by annexation of neighboring Fujimatsu and most of Yosami villages on April 1, 1955. Control of the Yosami Transmitting Station was returned to Japan from the United States Navy in 1994, and the former facility is now a city park.

== Government ==
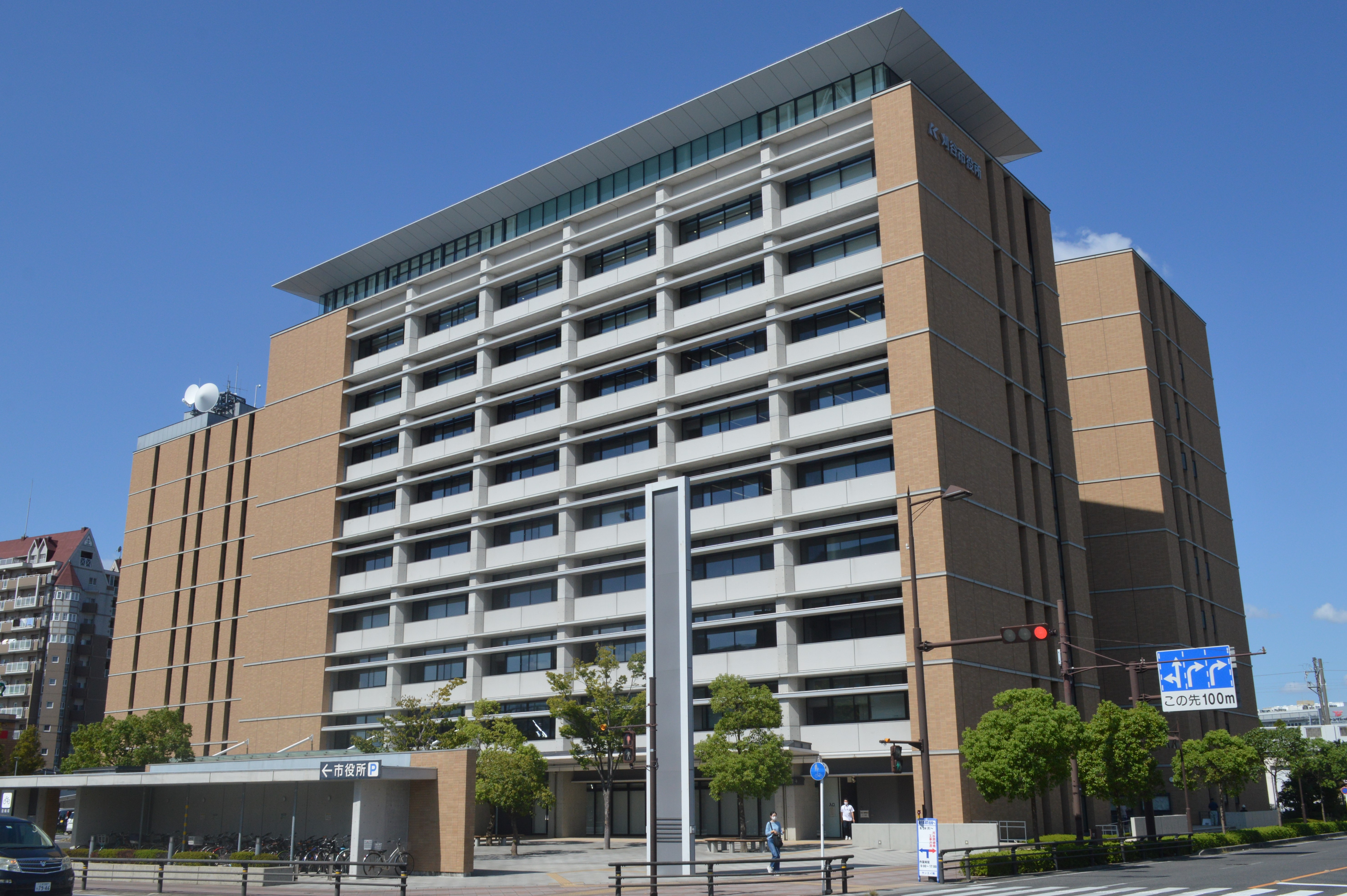
Kariya city hall

Kariya has a mayor-council form of government with a directly elected mayor and a unicameral city legislature of 28 members. The city contributes two members to the Aichi Prefectural Assembly. In terms of national politics, the city is part of Aichi District 13 of the lower house of the Diet of Japan.

== Sister cities ==
=== International ===
- Mississauga, Ontario, Canada, since July 7, 1981

=== National ===
- (Japan) Higashiyoshino, Nara Prefecture, since July 1, 2013

== Economy ==
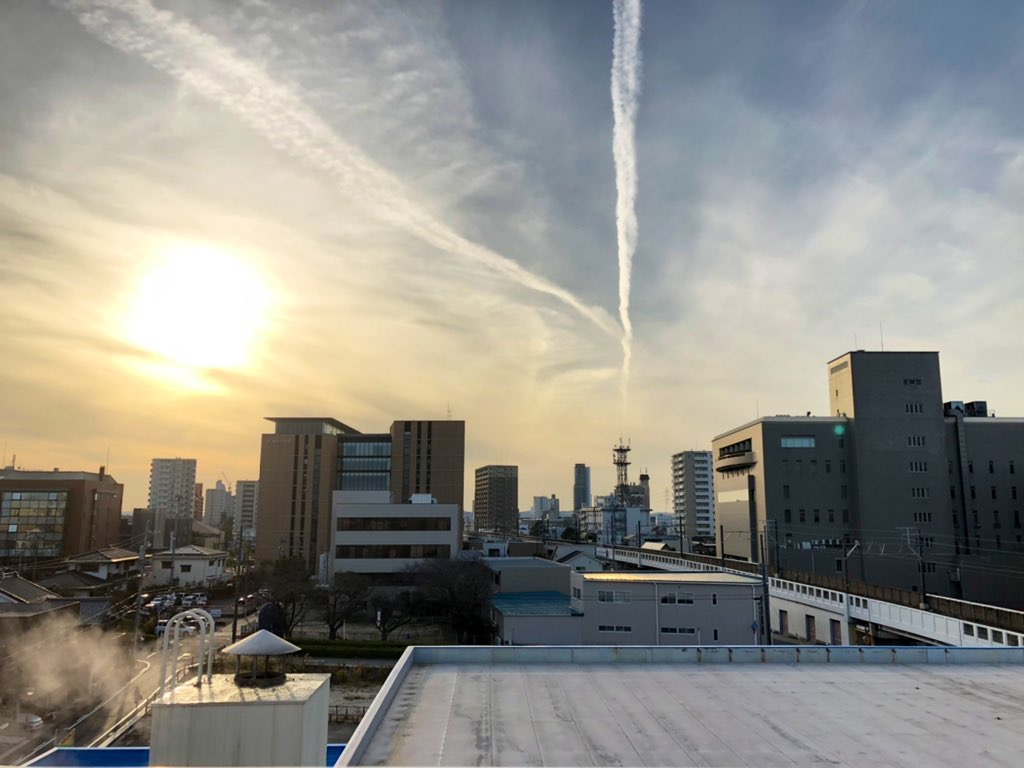
Kariya CBD

=== Secondary sector of the economy ===
==== Manufacturing ====
The economy of Kariya is dominated by companies related to the Toyota Group, including Toyota Industries Corporation, Aisin Seiki and Denso Corporation. Toyota Motor Corporation started as a division of Toyoda Automatic Loom Works (now called Toyota Industries Corporation). The Toyoda Automatic Loom Works was highly profitable and board members reinvested much of the profits into the growing automobile manufacturing business.

=== Companies headquartered in Kariya ===
- ADVICS
- Aisin
- Aska Corporation
- DCM Kahma
- Denso
- JTEKT
- Toyota Auto Body
- Toyota Boshoku
- Toyota Industries
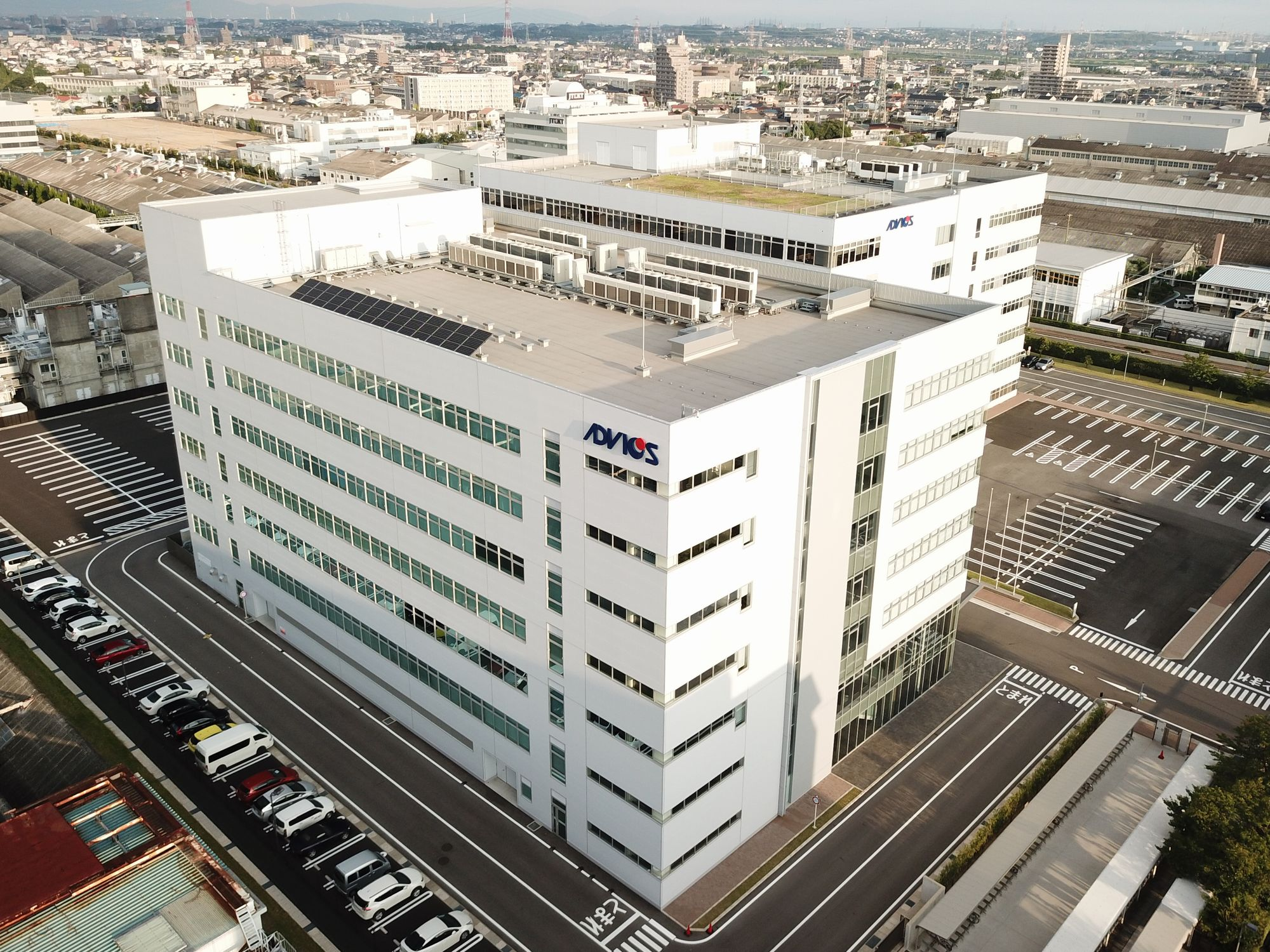
ADVICS

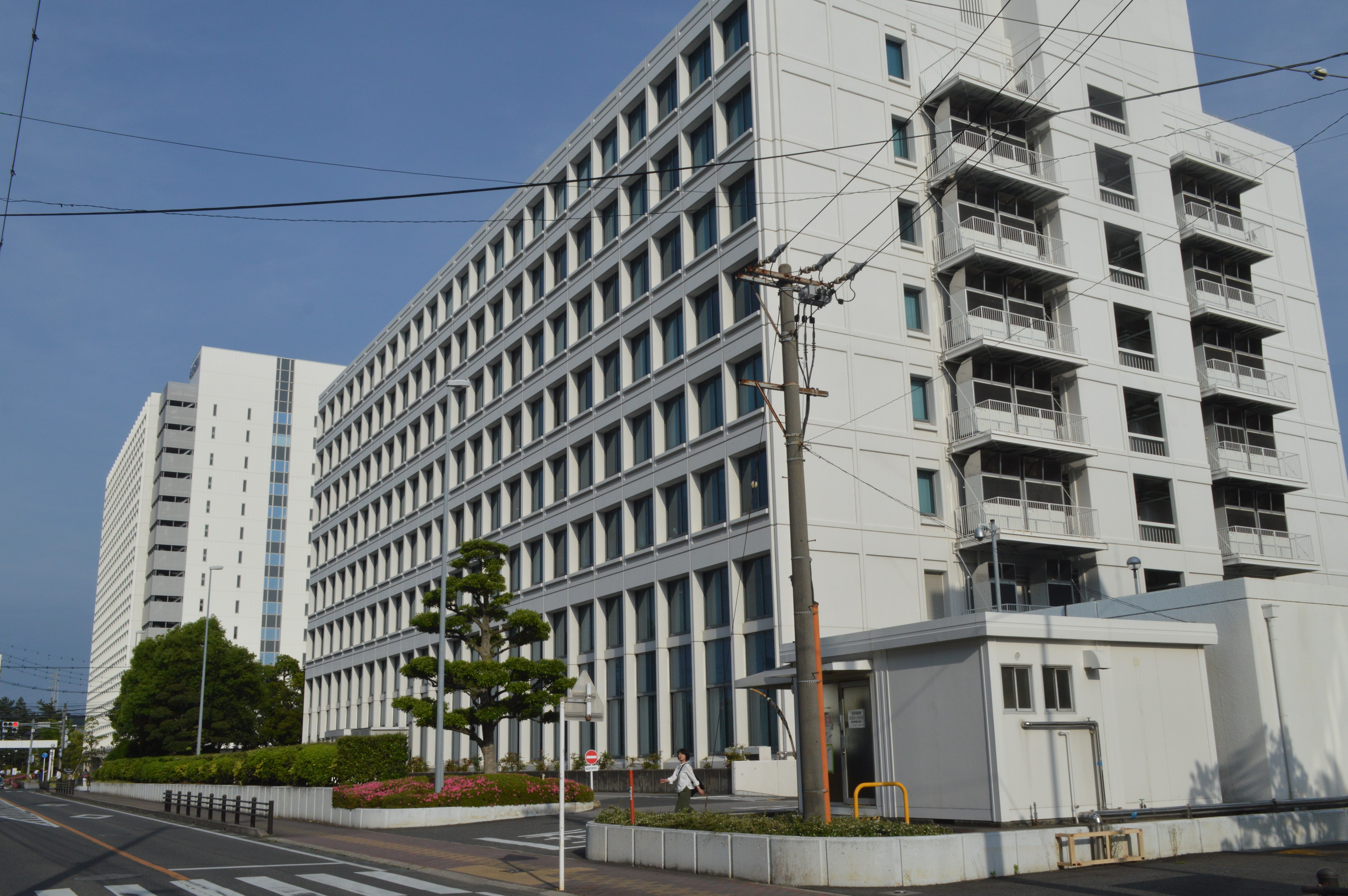
Aisin

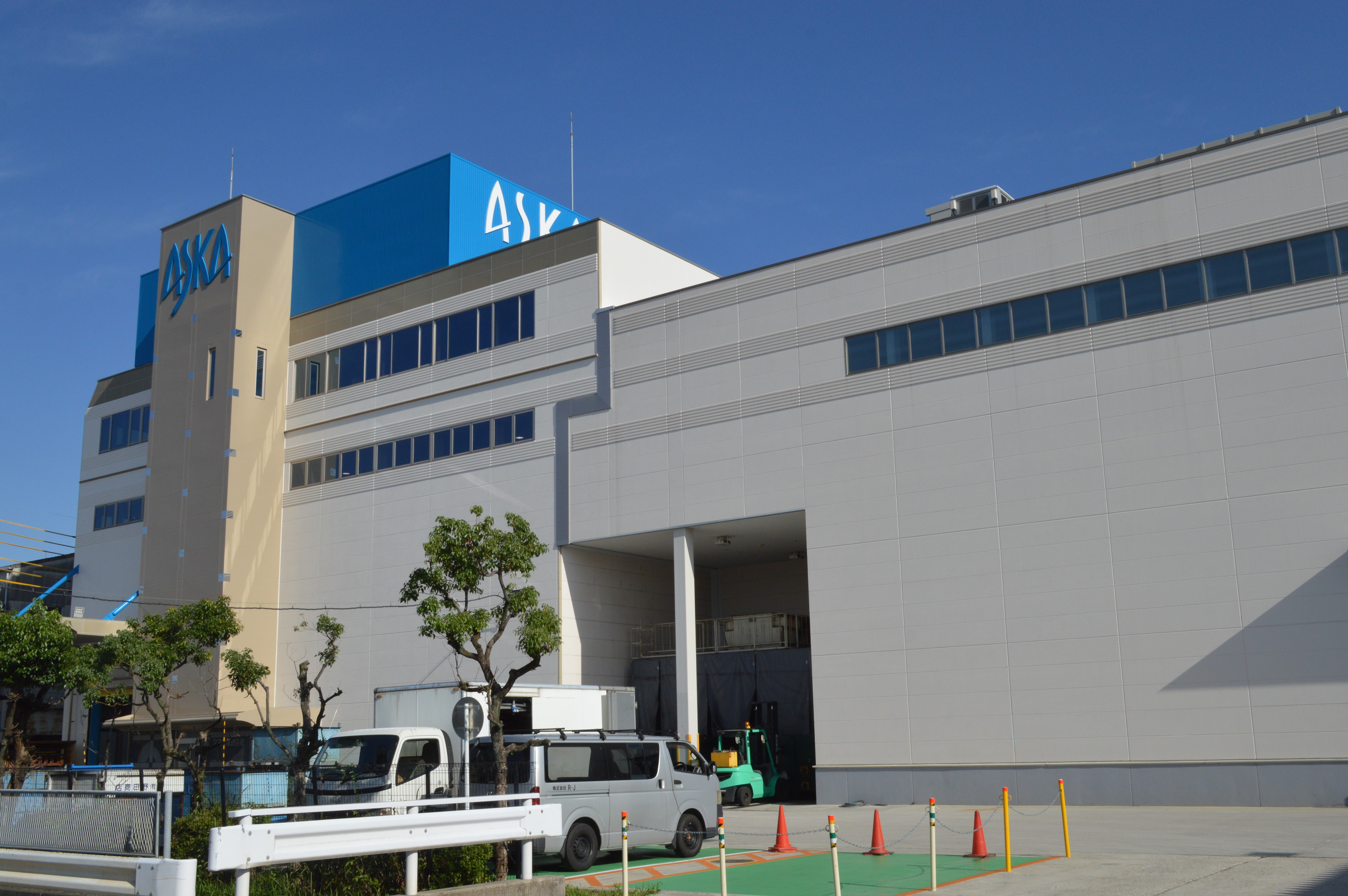
Aska Corporation

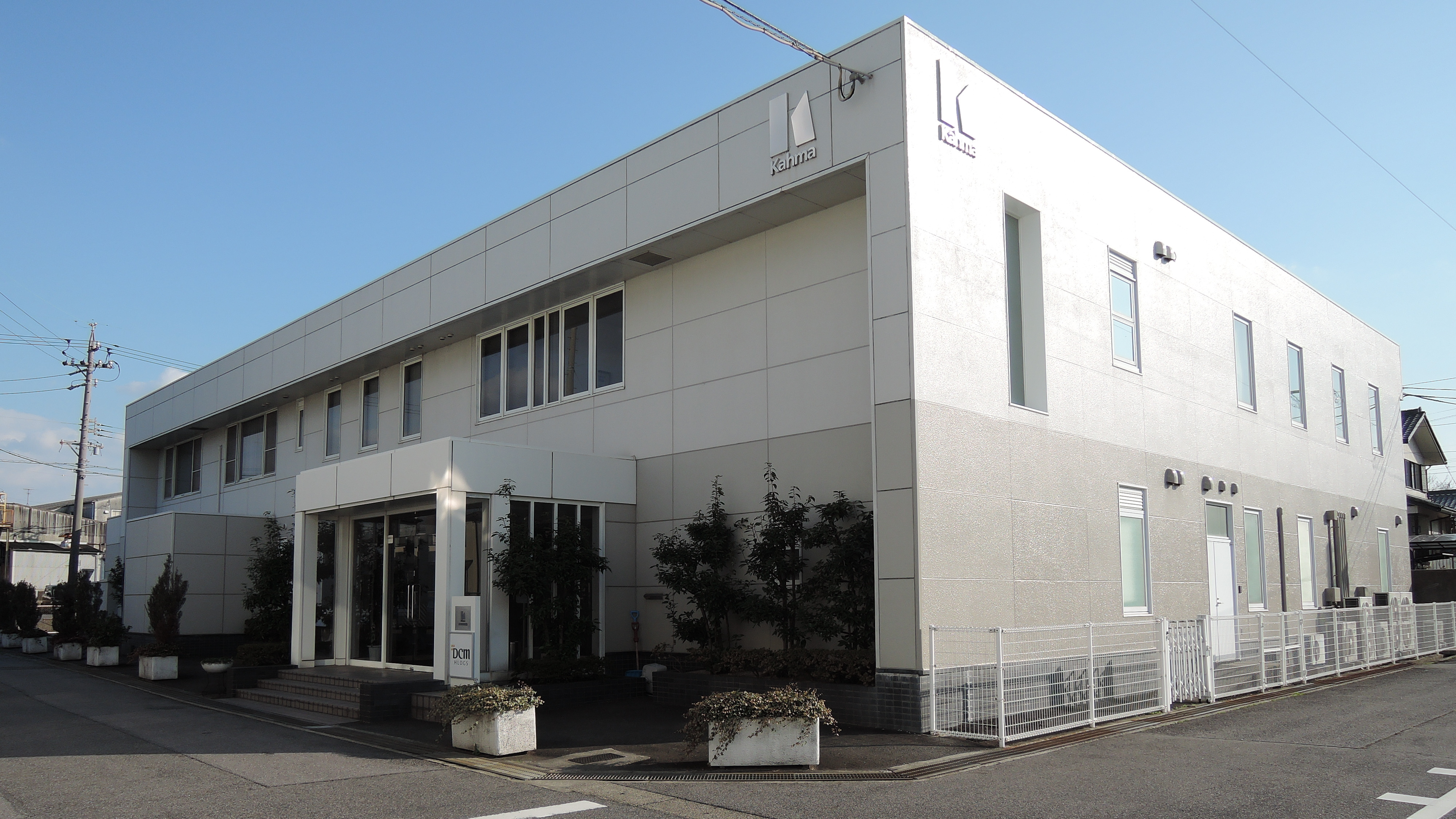
DCM Kahma

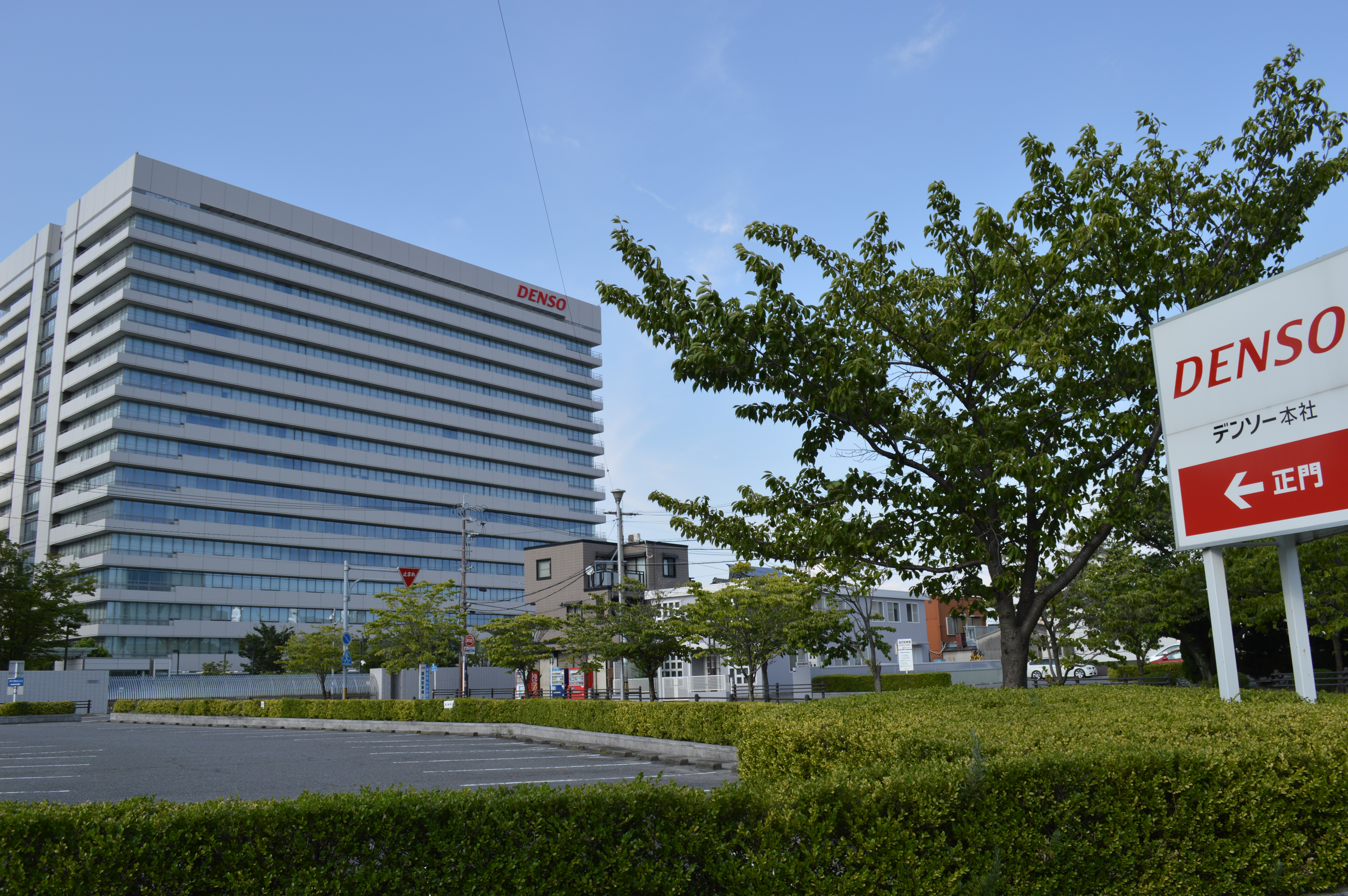
Denso

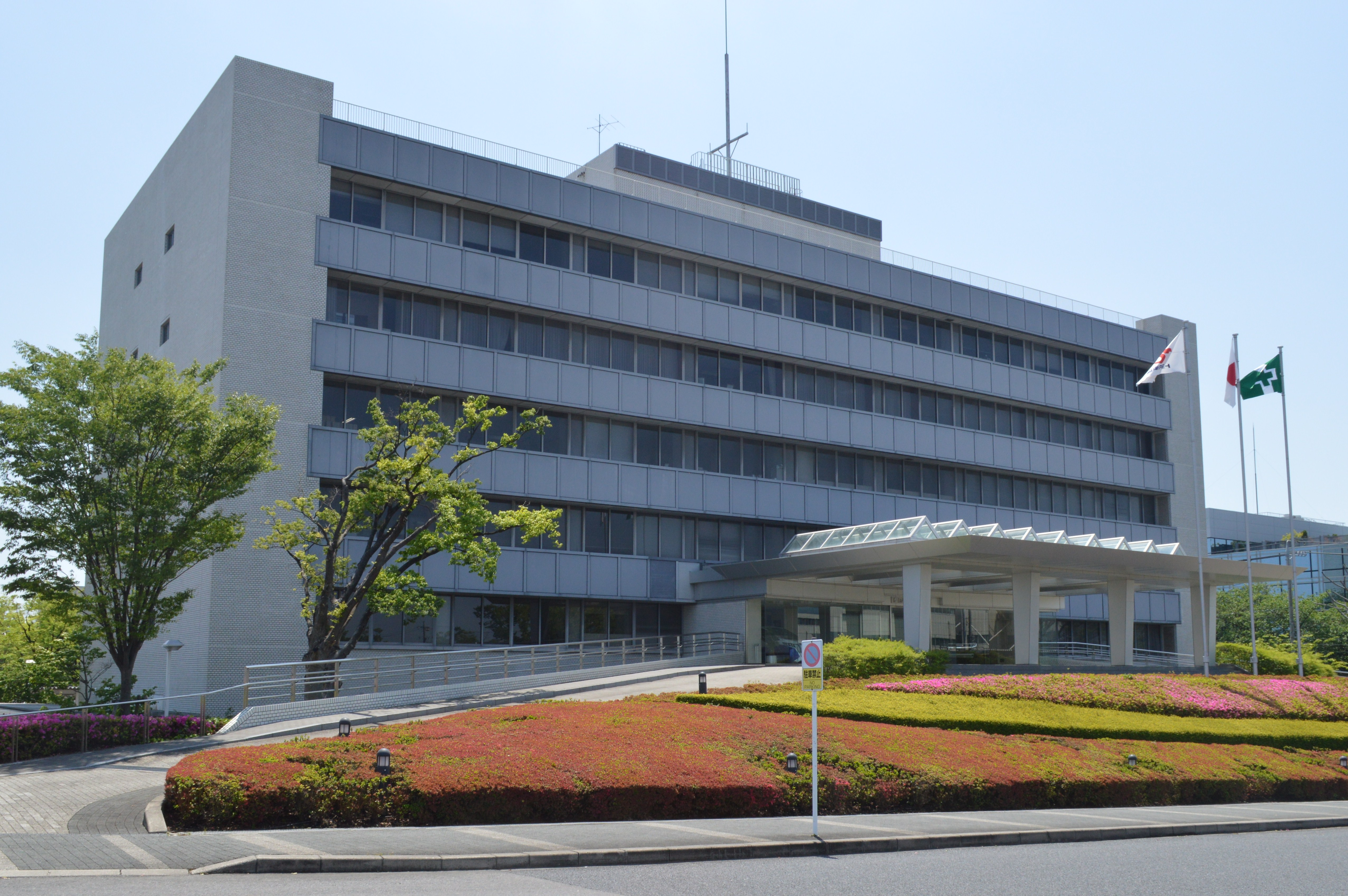
Toyota Auto Body

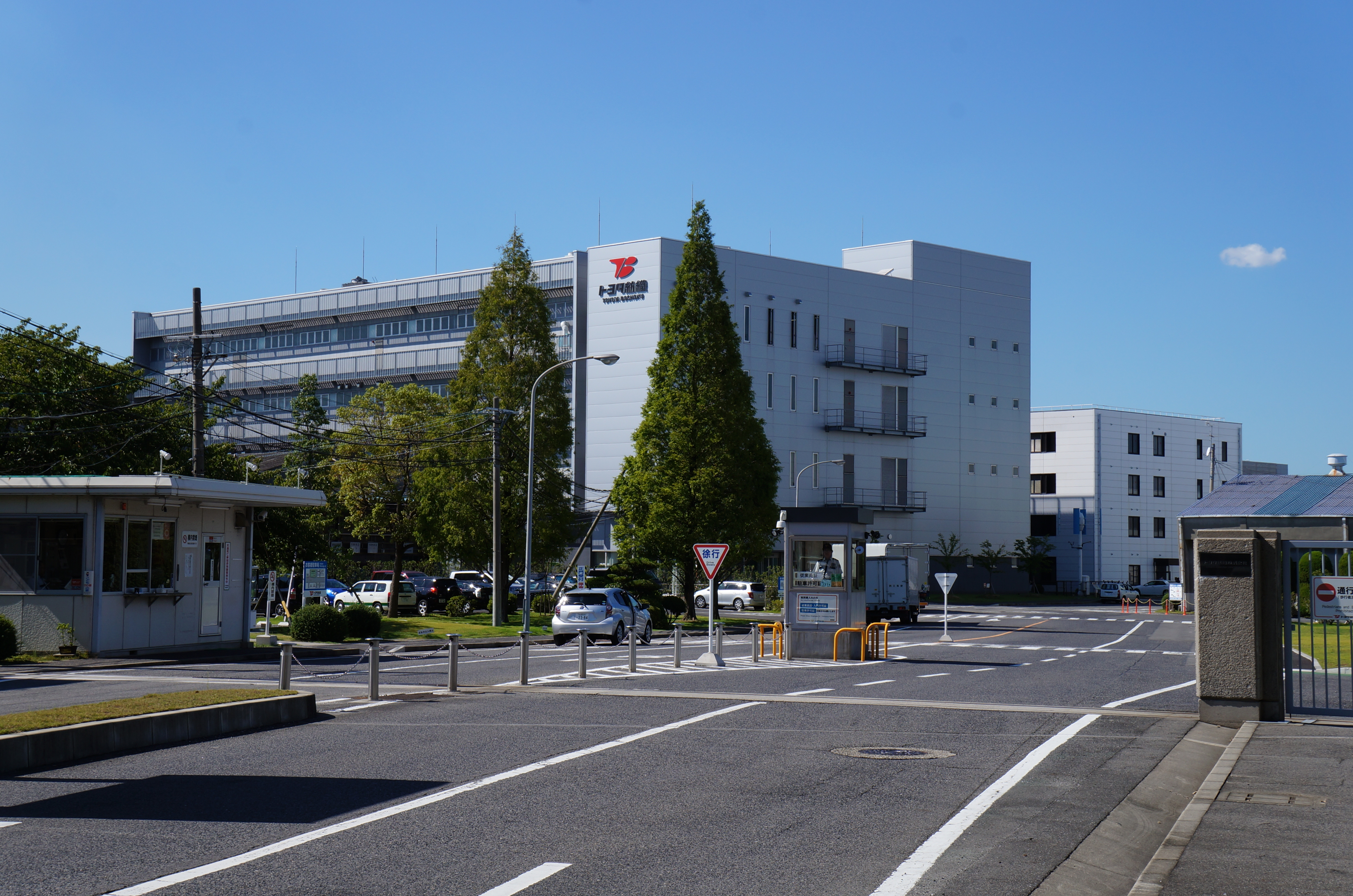
Toyota Boshoku

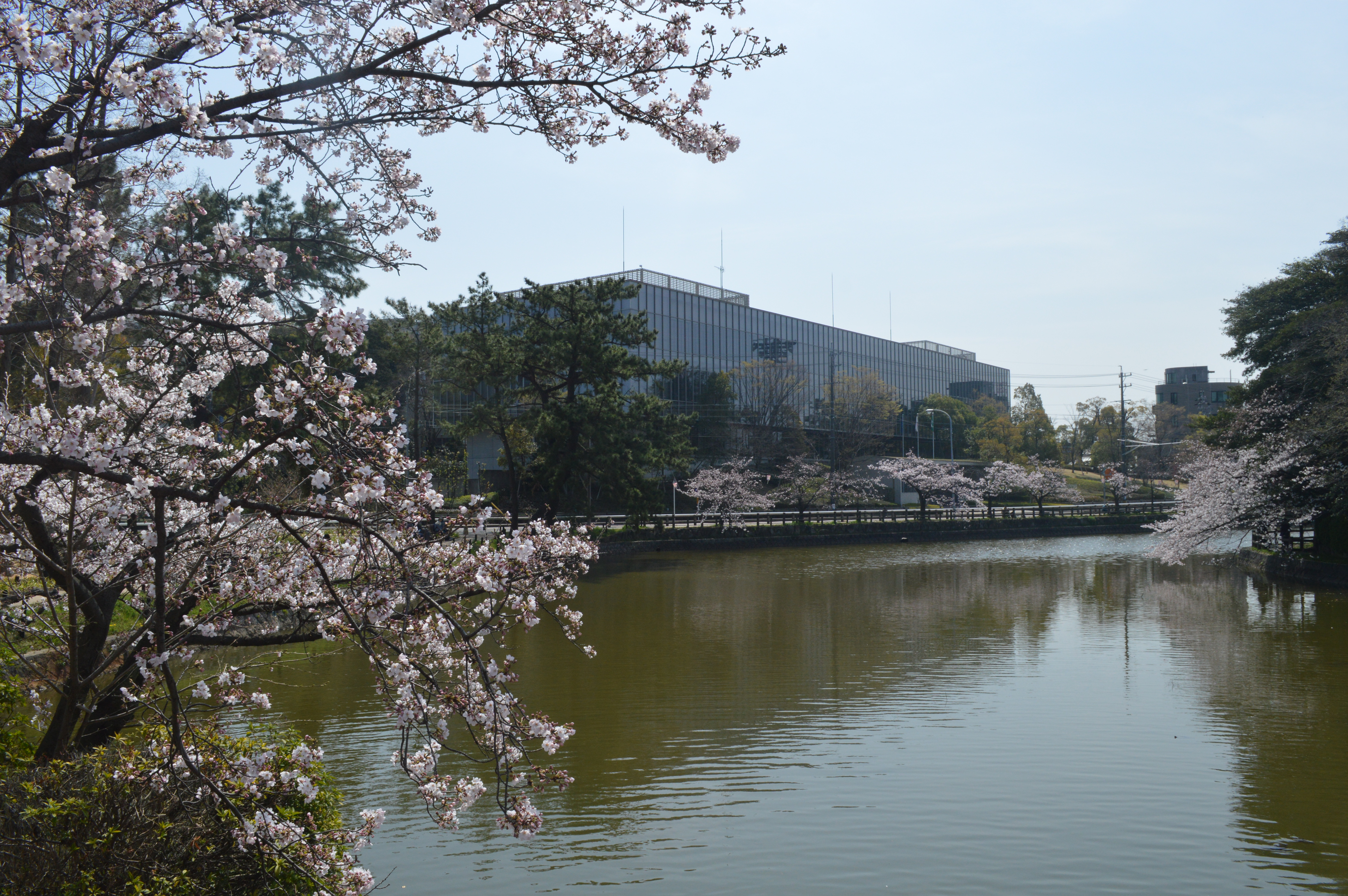
Toyota Industries

== Education ==
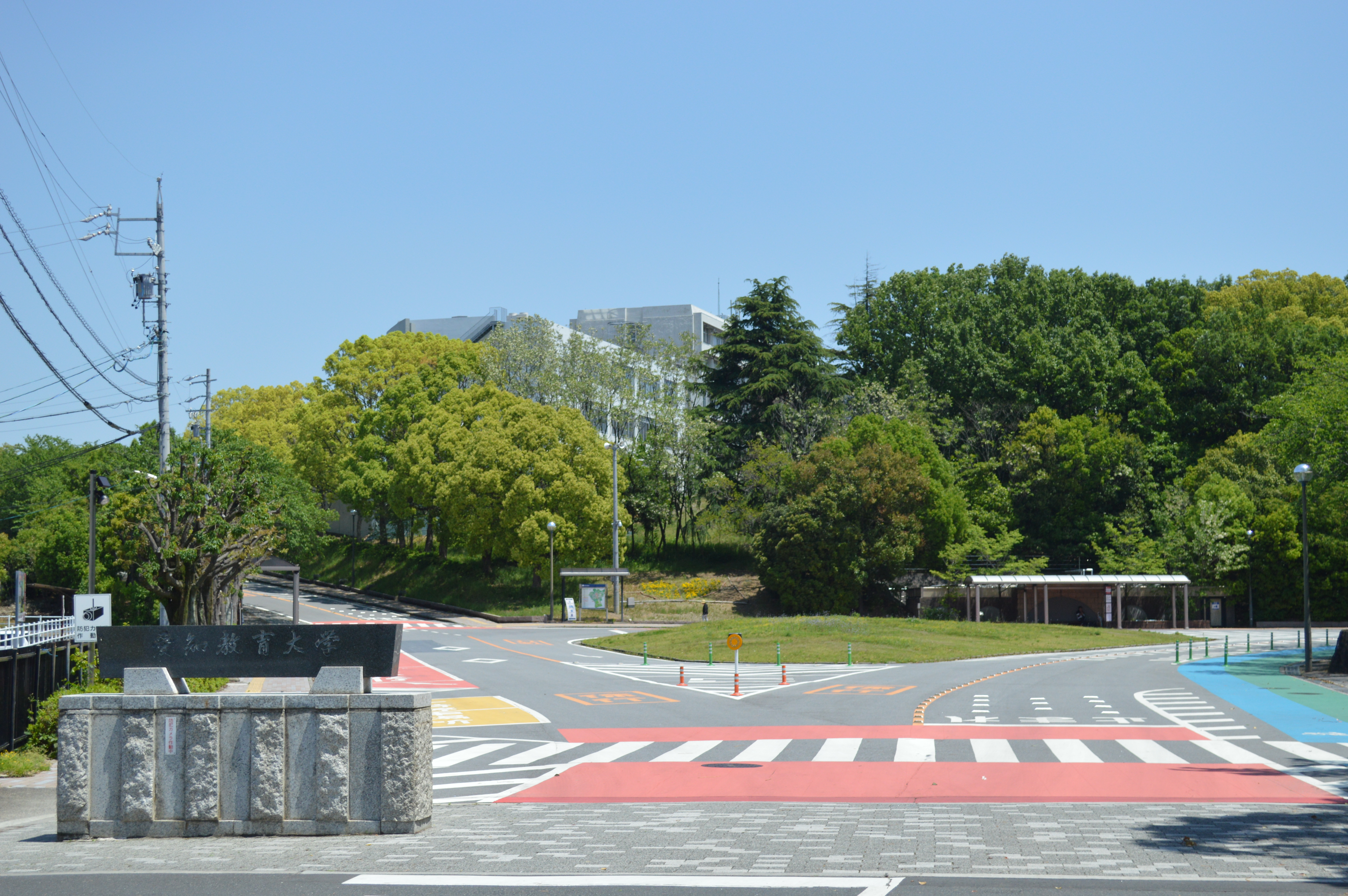
Aichi University of Education

=== University ===
- Aichi University of Education

=== Schools ===
- Kariya has 15 public elementary schools and six public junior high schools operated by the city government, and four public high schools operated by the Aichi Prefectural Board of Education. There are also one public high schools operated by the national government.

=== International School ===
- The Colégio Pitágoras Brasil, a Brazilian school was previously located in Kariya.

== Transportation ==
Map of Meitetsu Mikawa Line

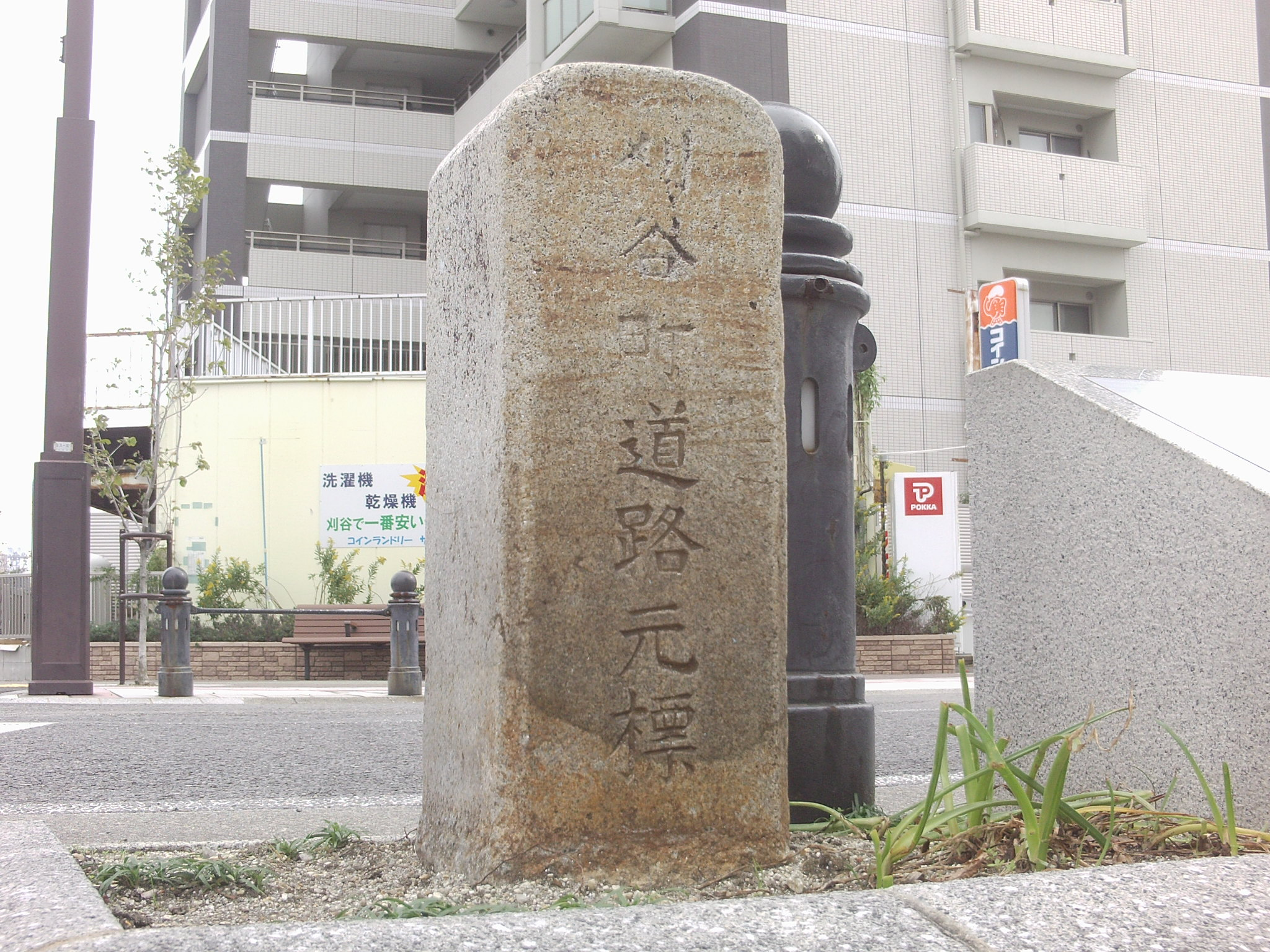
The Kilometre Zero of Kariya

=== Railway ===
==== Conventional lines ====
Central Japan Railway Company

- Tōkaidō Main Line: - Higashi-Kariya - Noda-Shimmachi - Kariya - Aizuma -

Meitetsu

- Meitetsu Nagoya Main Line: - Hitotsugi - Fujimatsu -
- Mikawa Line: - Kariya - Kariyashi - Ogakie -

=== Roads ===
==== Expressway ====
- Isewangan Expressway

==== Japan National Route ====
- National Route 1
- National Route 23
- National Route 155
- National Route 419
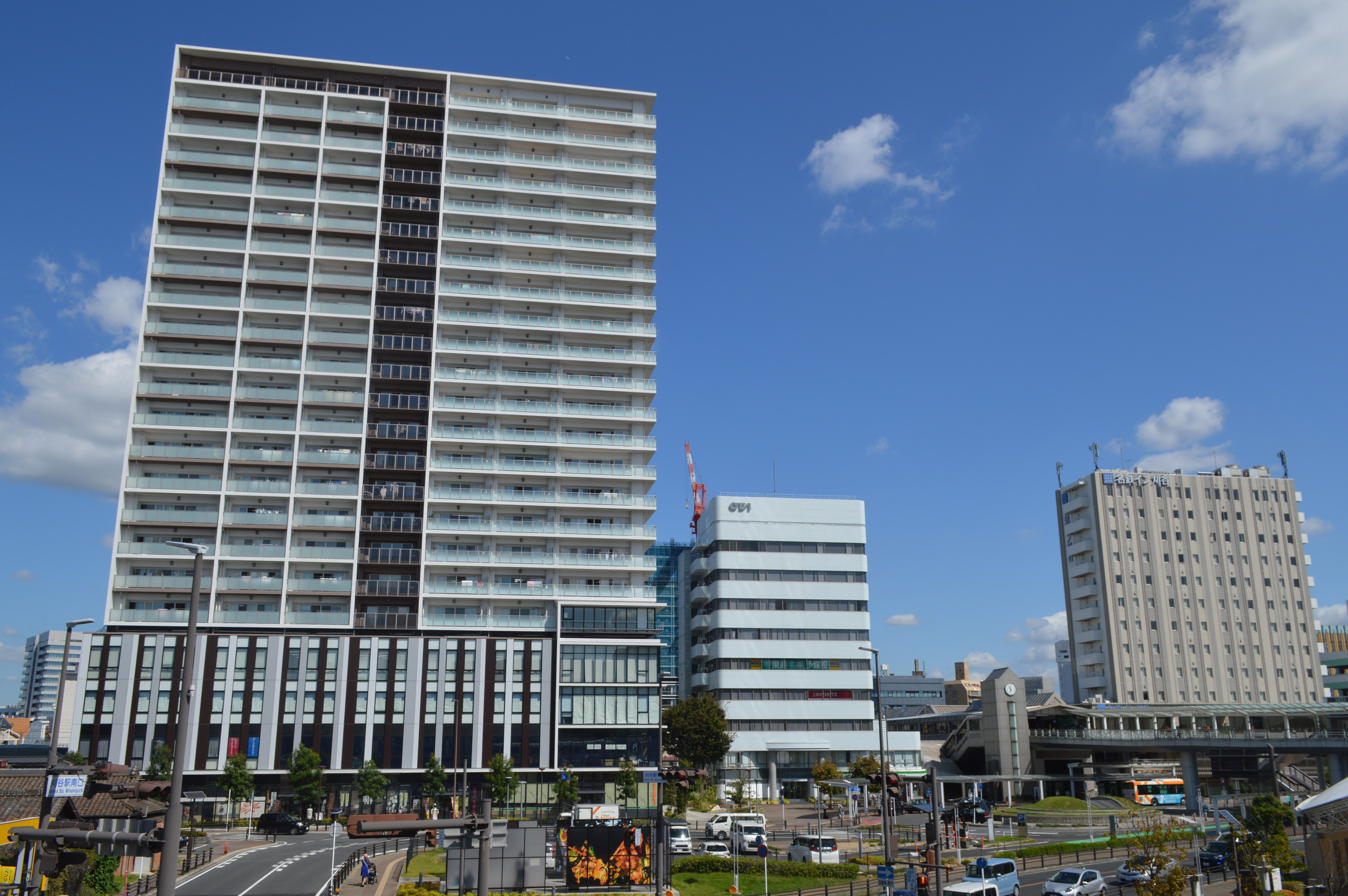
Kariya Station

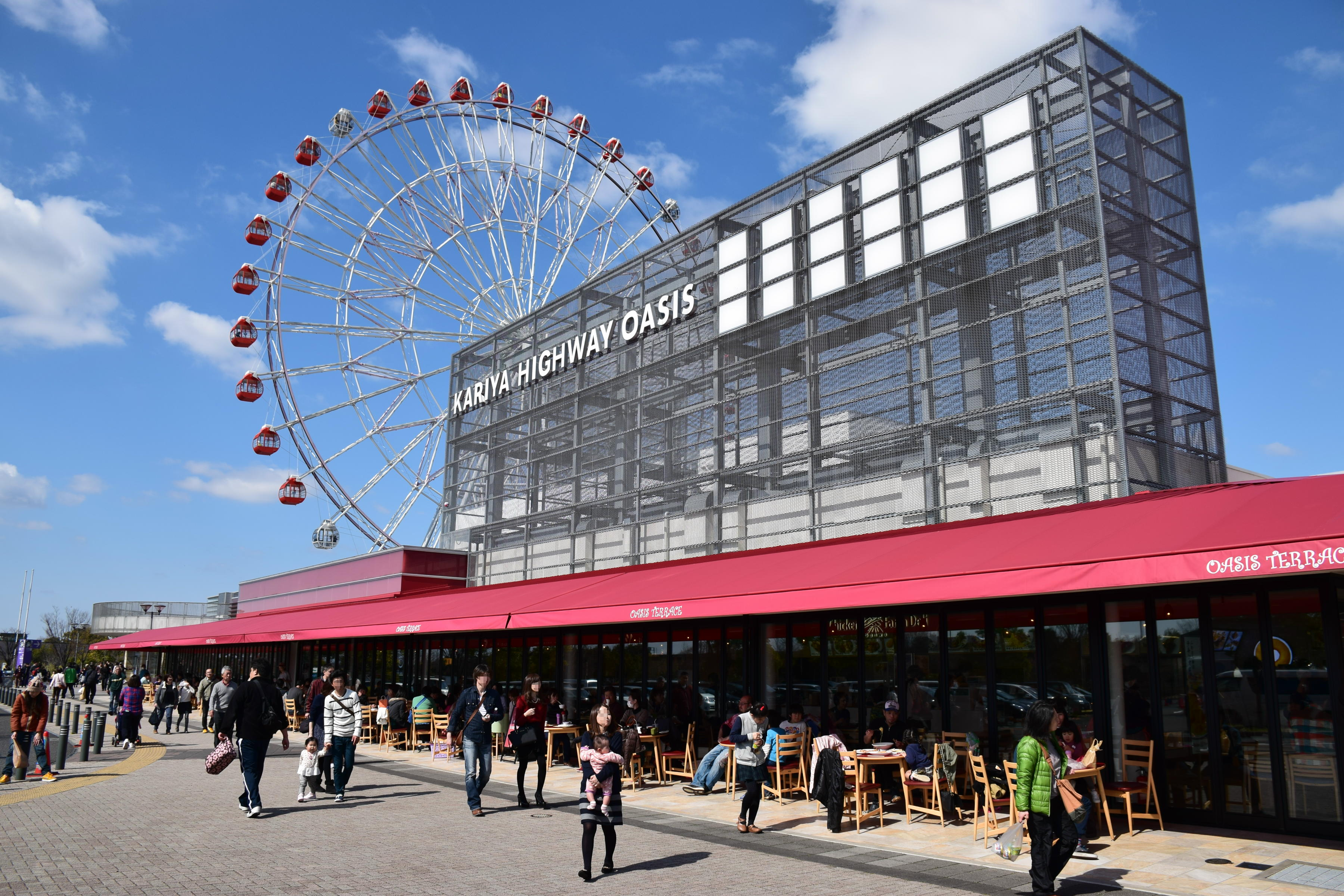
Kariya Parking Area
(Kariya Highway Oasis)

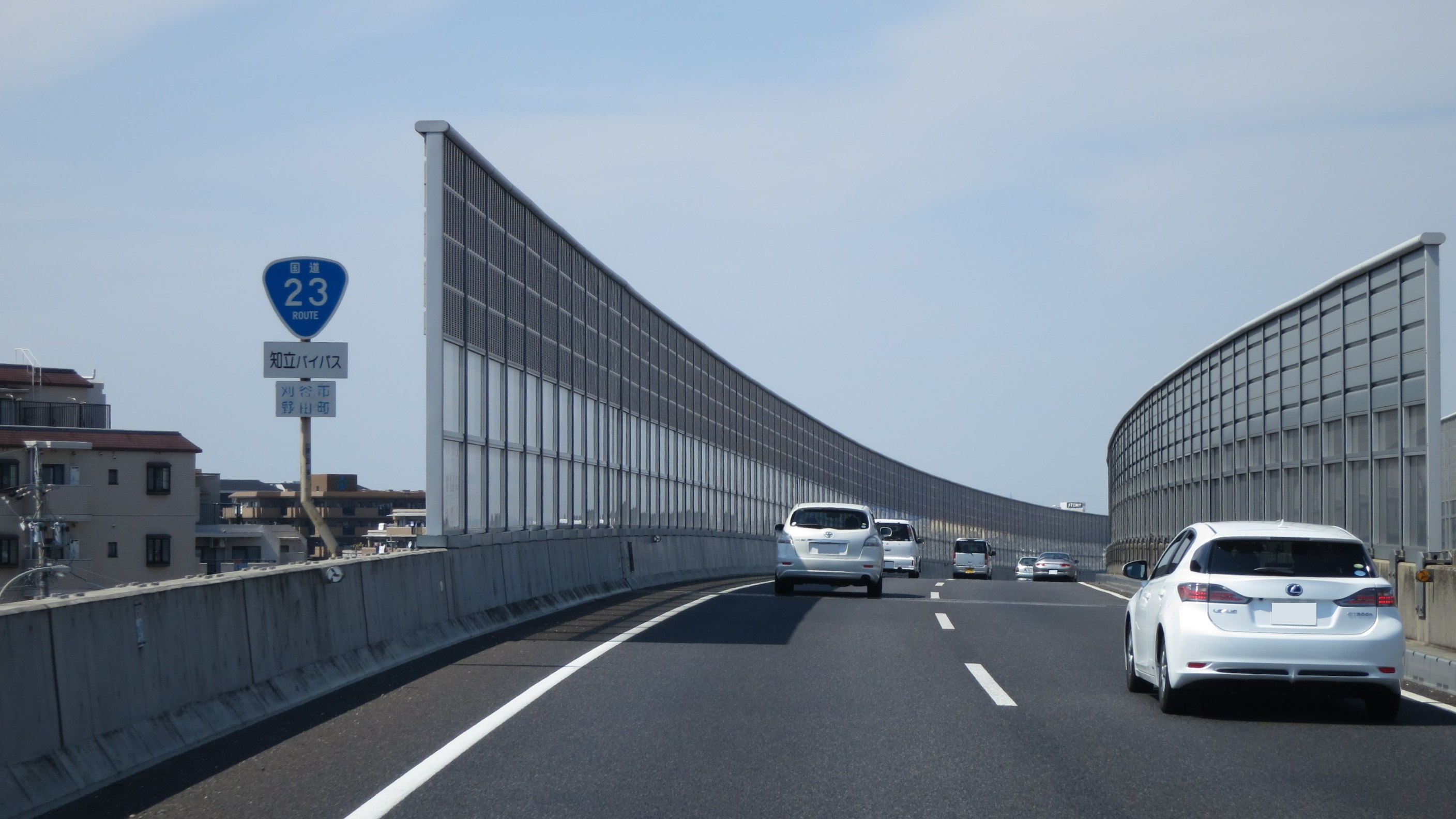
Japan National Route 23
(Chiryu Bypass)

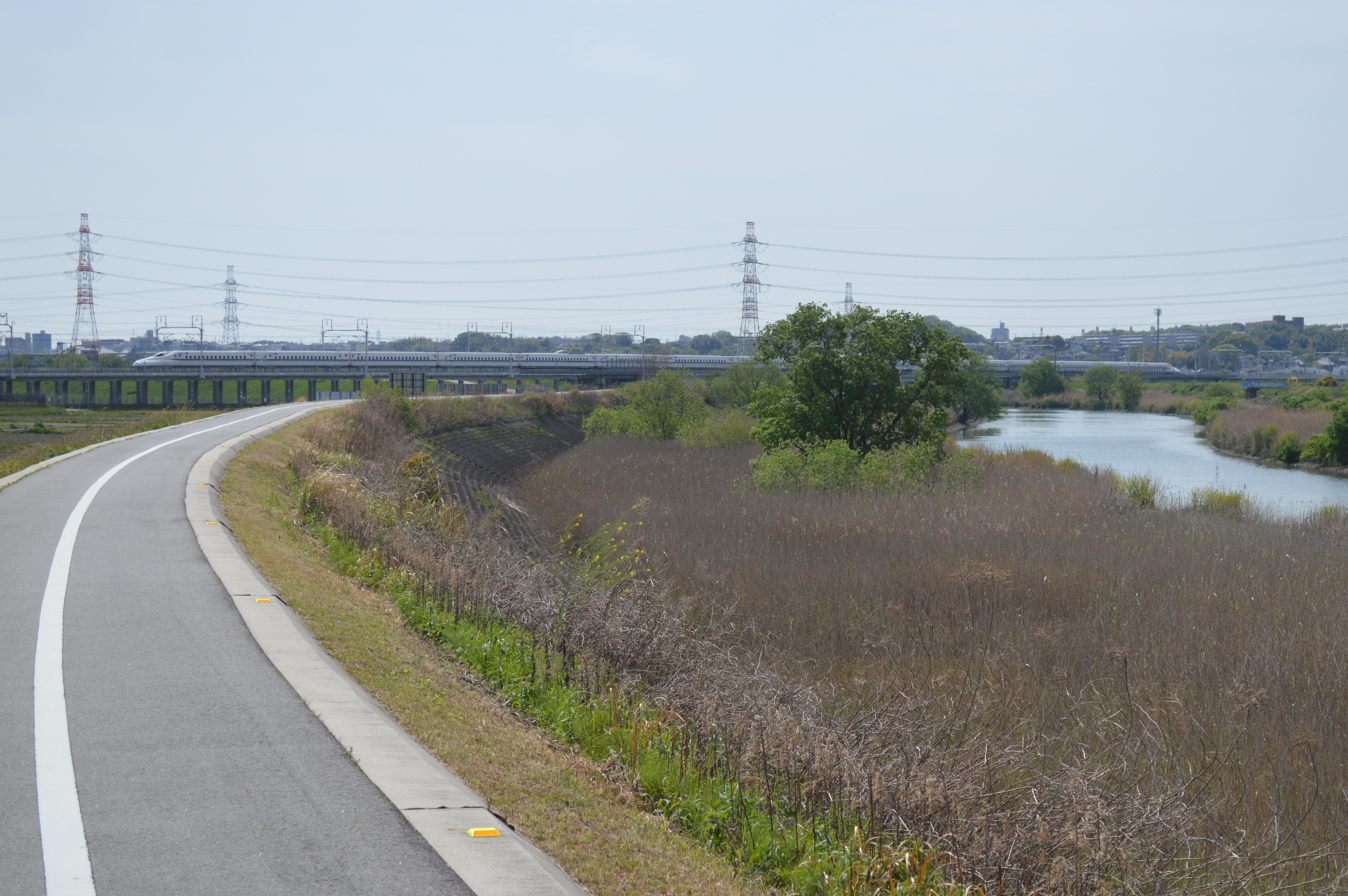
Aizuma river cycling road

== Culture ==
=== Festival ===
- Mando Matsuri

=== Tokusanhin ===
- Dried turnip (Kiriboshi Daikon)

=== Sports ===
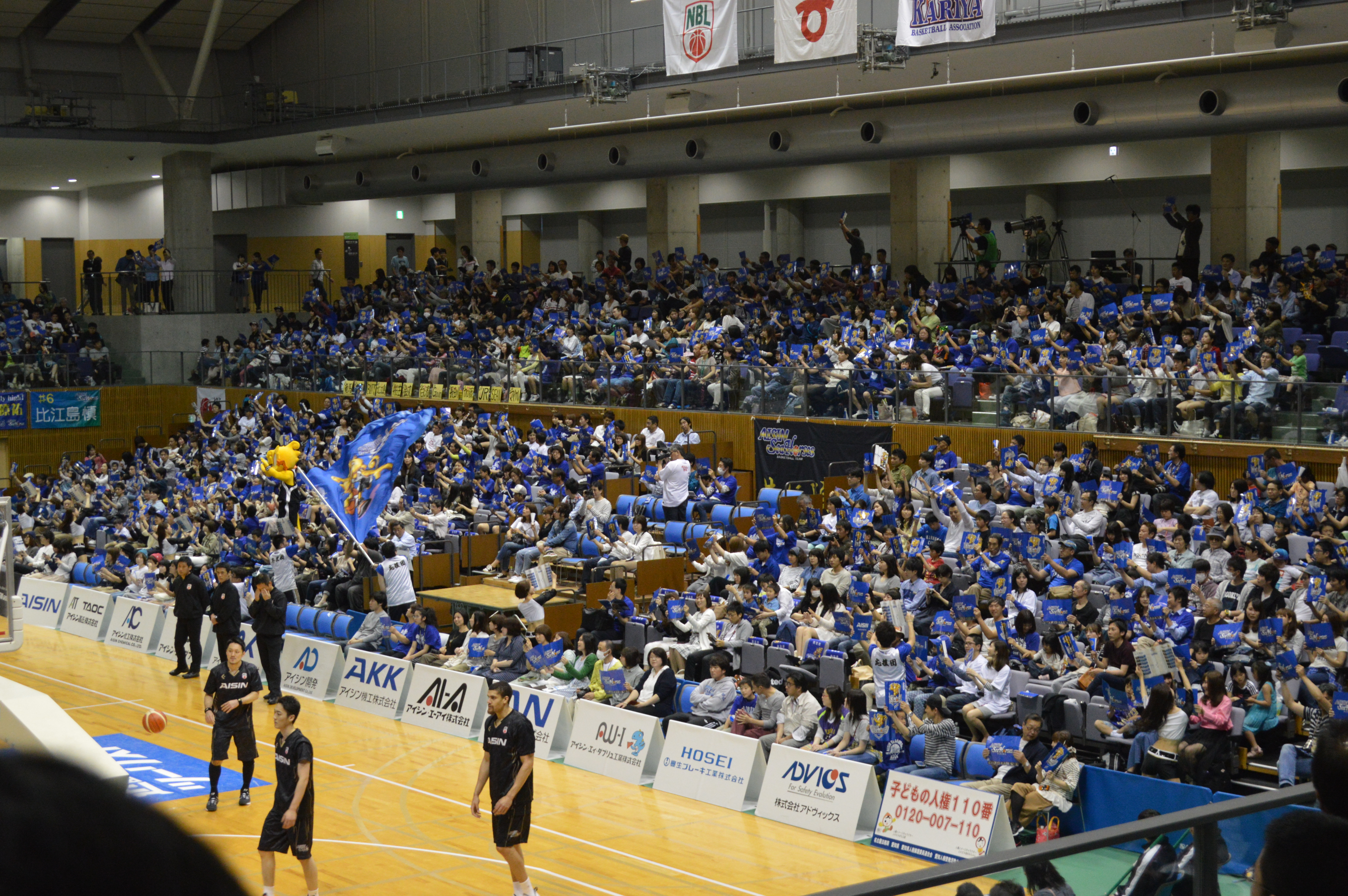
SeaHorses Mikawa

The city is home to the SeaHorses Mikawa, 5-time champion of Japan's top professional basketball league.

Sex	Name	competition	League	Home	Sponsor	Since
Men	Toyota Industries SC	Soccer	Tōkai Regional League	Toyota Industries Obu plant ground	Toyota Industries	1946
Men	SeaHorses Mikawa	Basketball	B.League (B1)	Wing Arena Kariya	SeaHorses Mikawa	1947
Women	Toyota Auto Body Queenseis	Volleyball	V.League (V1)	Kariya City Gymnasium	Toyota Auto Body	1951
Women	Toyota Industries Shyning VEGA	Softball	Japan Softball League (JSL)	Kariya Stadium	Toyota Industries	1952
Men	JTEKT Stings	Volleyball	V.League (V1)	Kariya City Gymnasium	JTEKT	1958
Women	Denso Iris	Women's basketball	W.League	Wing Arena Kariya	Denso	1962
Men	Toyota Auto Body BRAVE KINGS	Handball	Japan Handball League (JHL)	Toyota Auto Body Yoshiwara Gymnasium	Toyota Auto Body	1967
Women	Toyota Boshoku Sunshine Rabbits	Women's basketball	W.League	Wing Arena Kariya	Toyota Boshoku	1980
Men	Toyota Industries Shuttles	Rugby	Top Challenge League (Top1)	Toyota Industries Kariya ground	Toyota Industries	1984
Men	FC Kariya	Soccer	Japan Football League (JFL)	Wave stadium Kariya	MIKAWA BAY FOOTBALL CLUB	2006

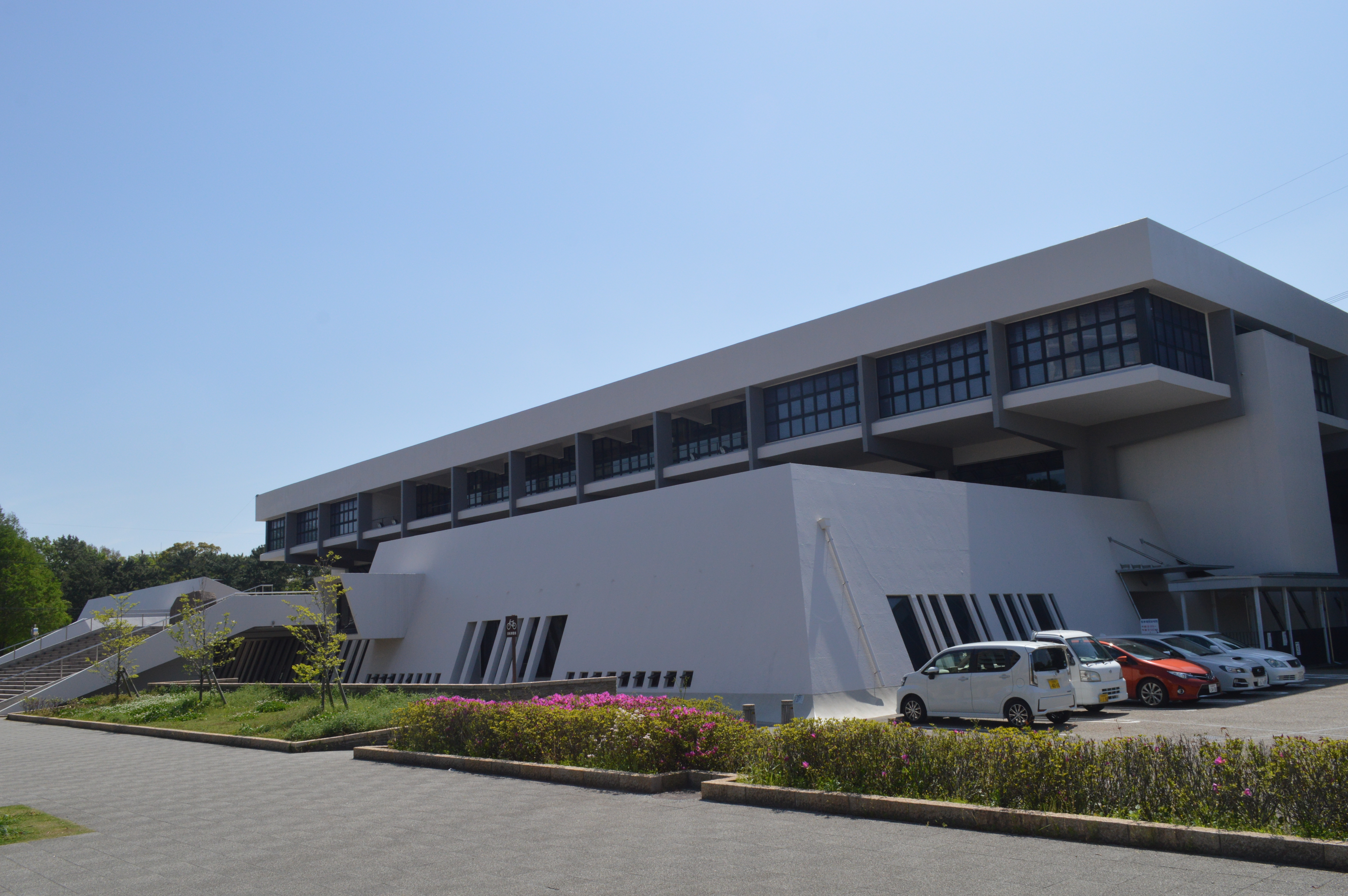
Kariya City Gymnasium

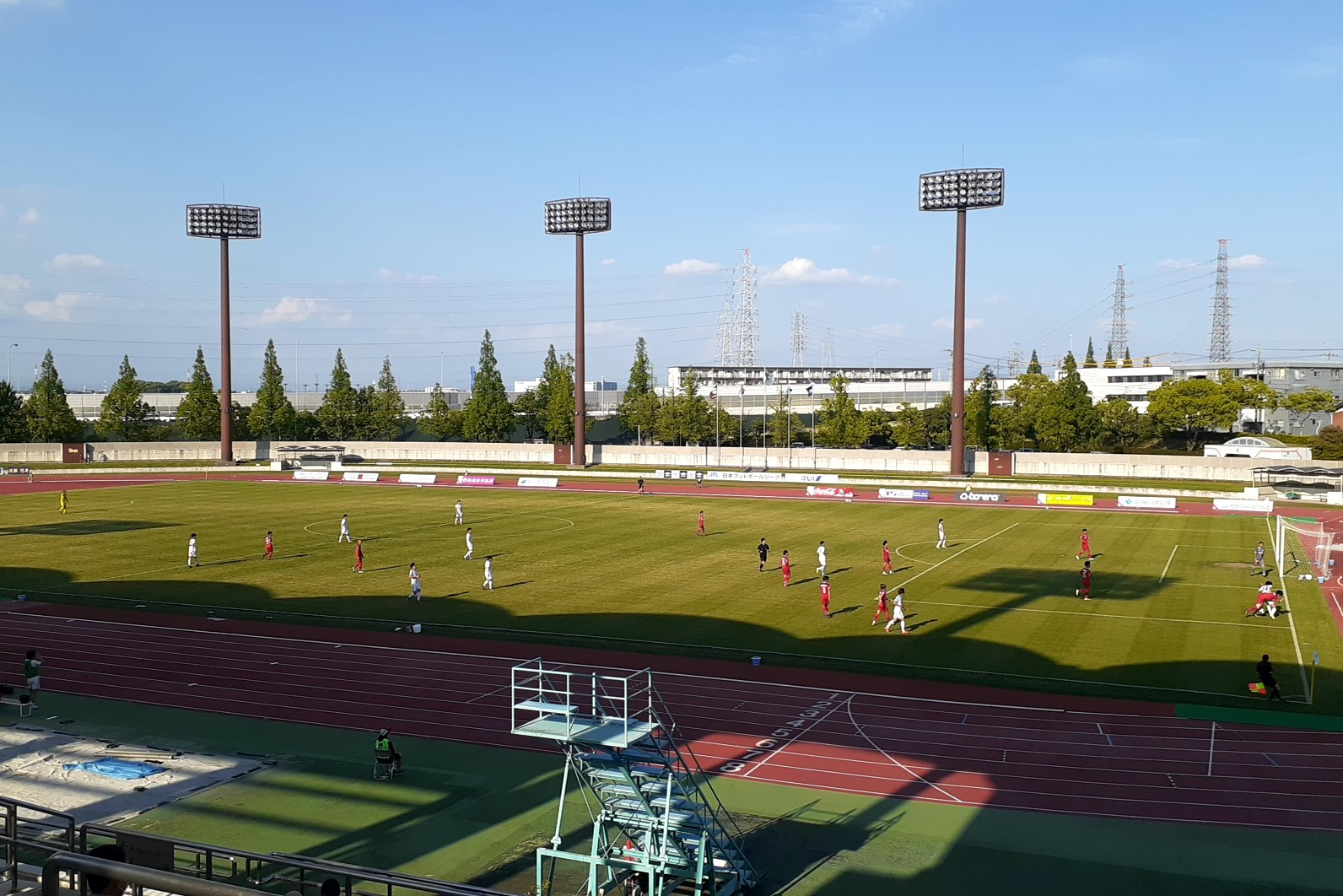
Wave stadium Kariya

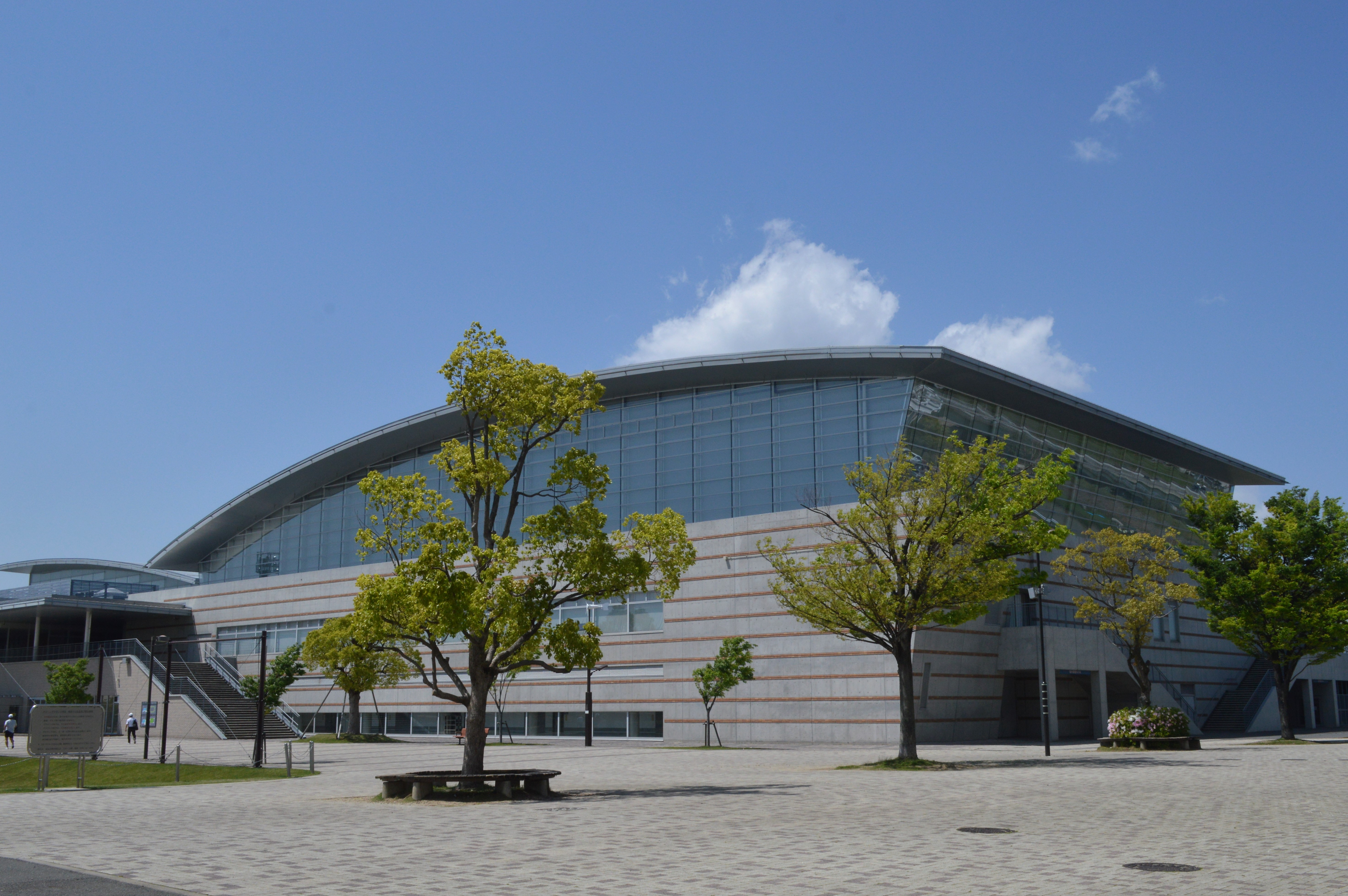
Wing Arena Kariya

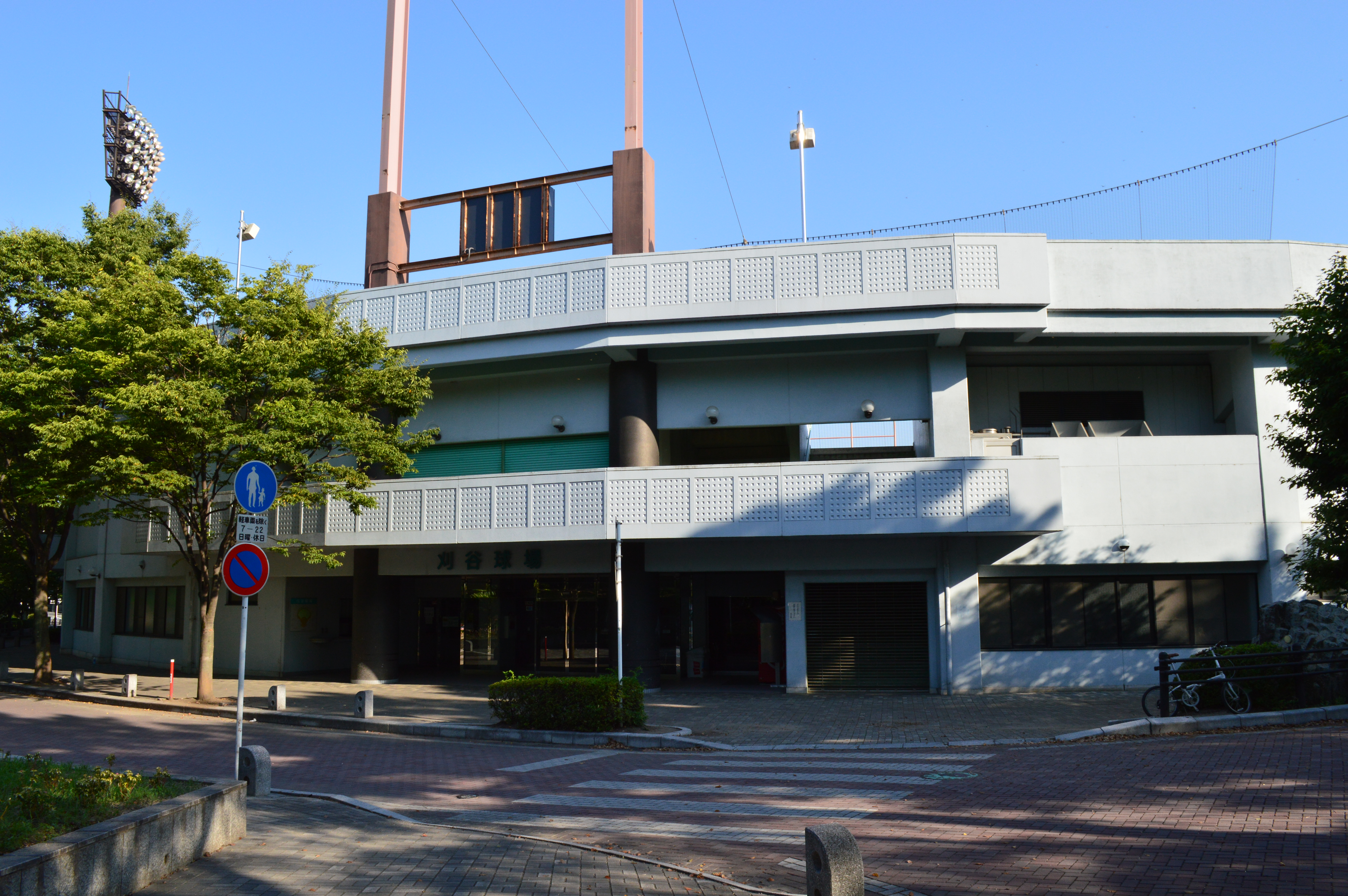
Kariya Stadium

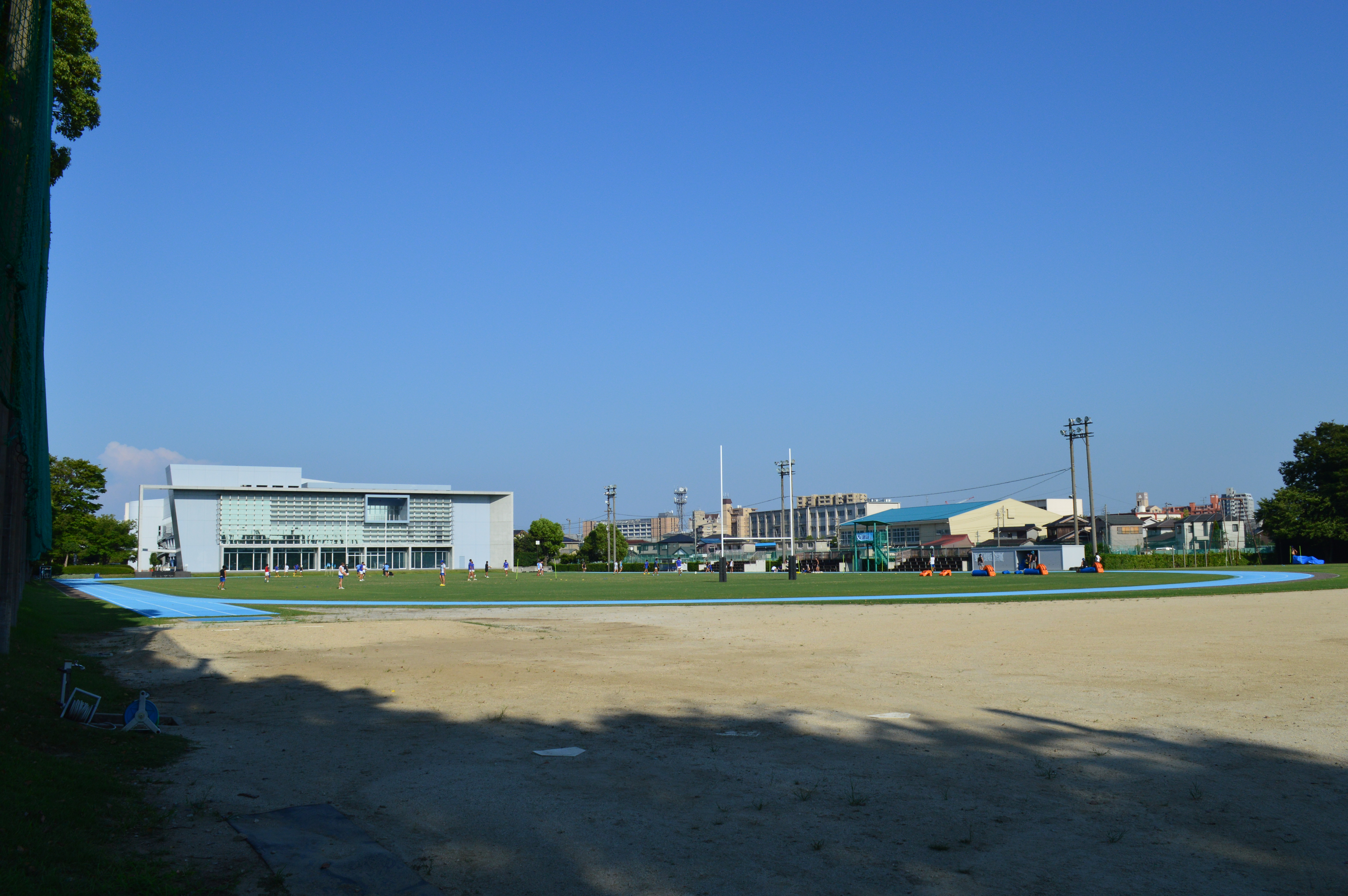
Toyota Industries Kariya ground

== Local attractions ==
  - Kariya castle
- Kariya city Children's traffic park
- Kariya Highway Oasis
- Kijo Park
- Mississauga Park - in honour of twinning with Mississauga, Ontario and scaled model of Mississauga City Centre
- Suhara Park
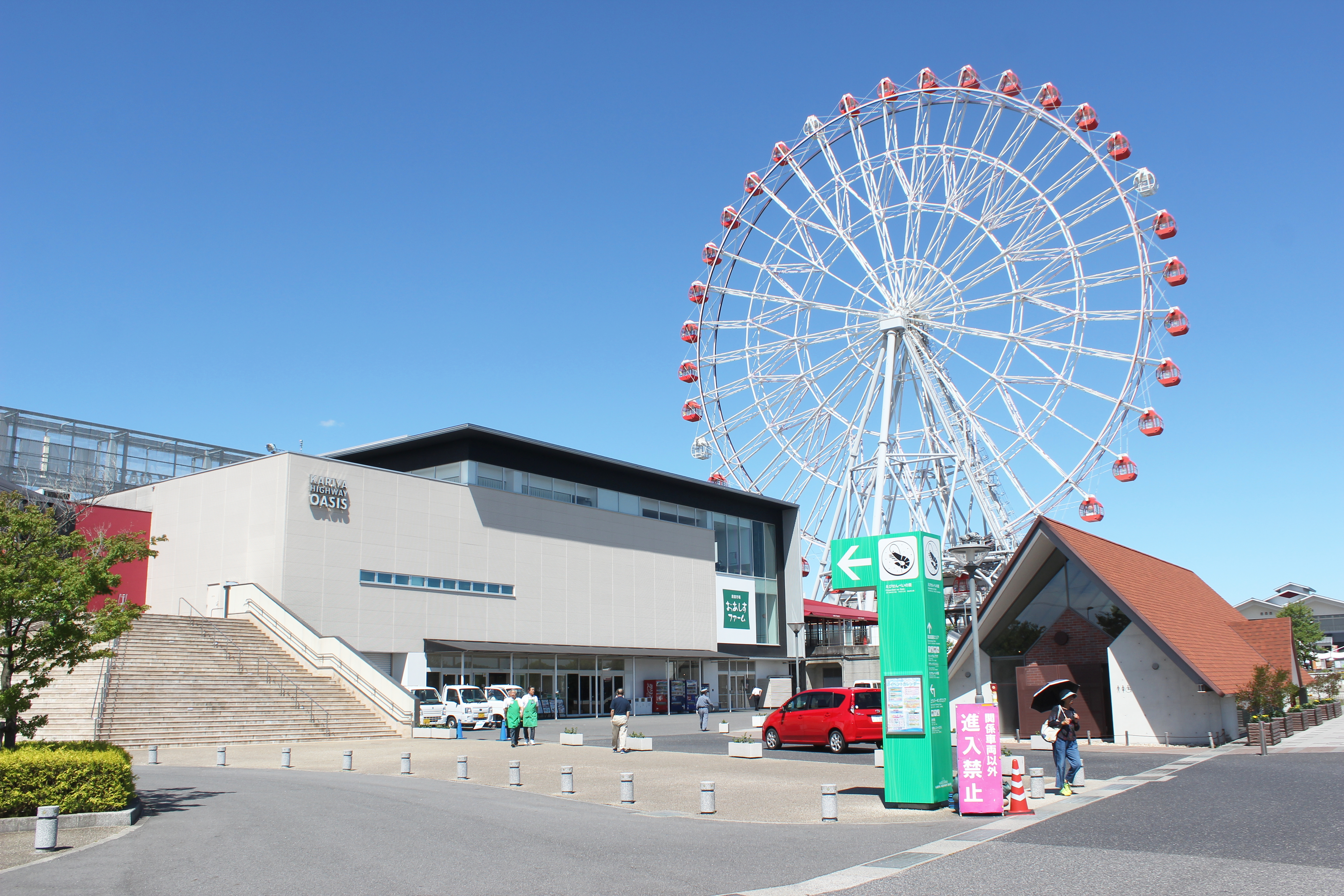
Kariya Highway Oasis

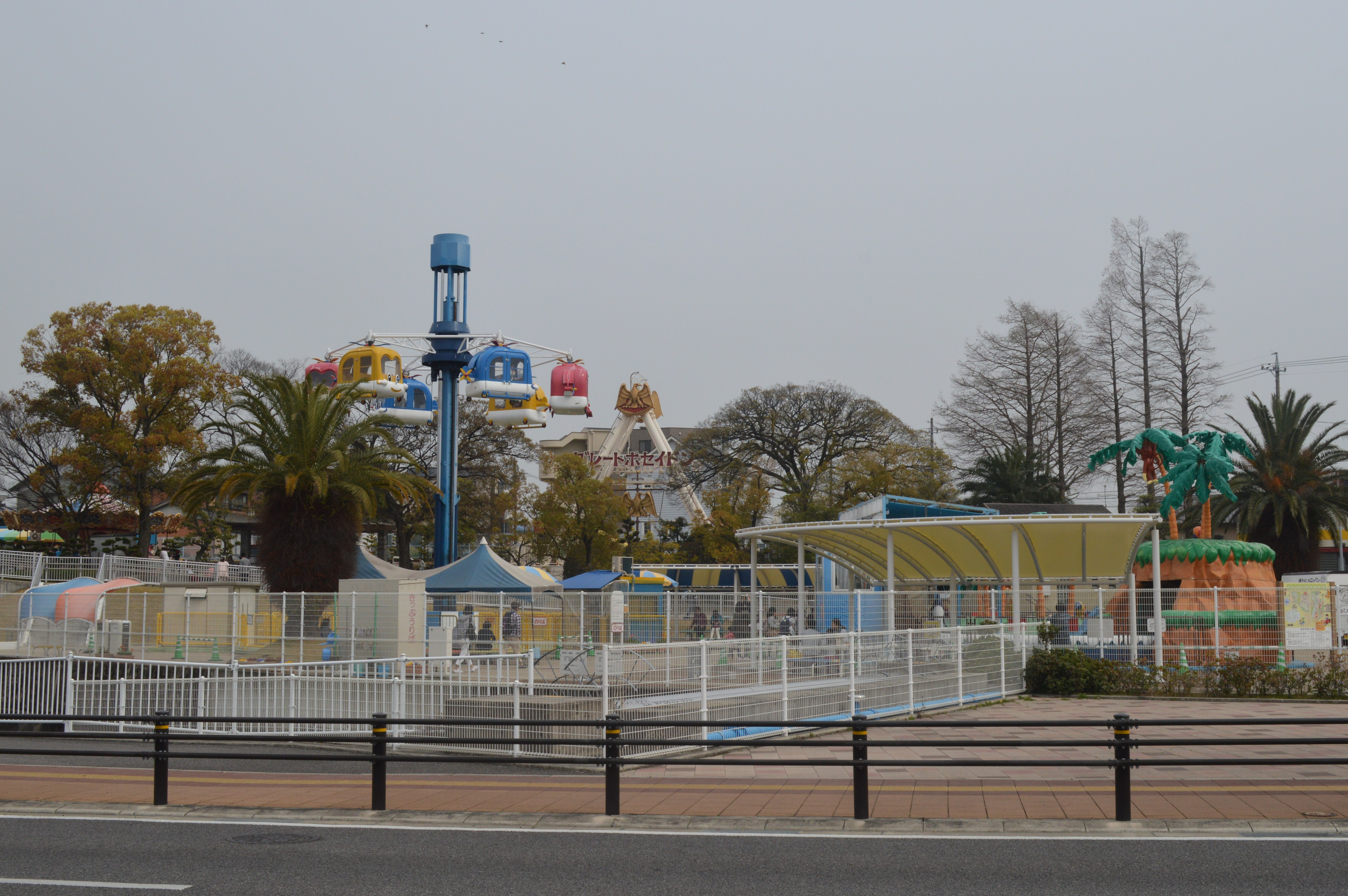
Kariya city Children's traffic park

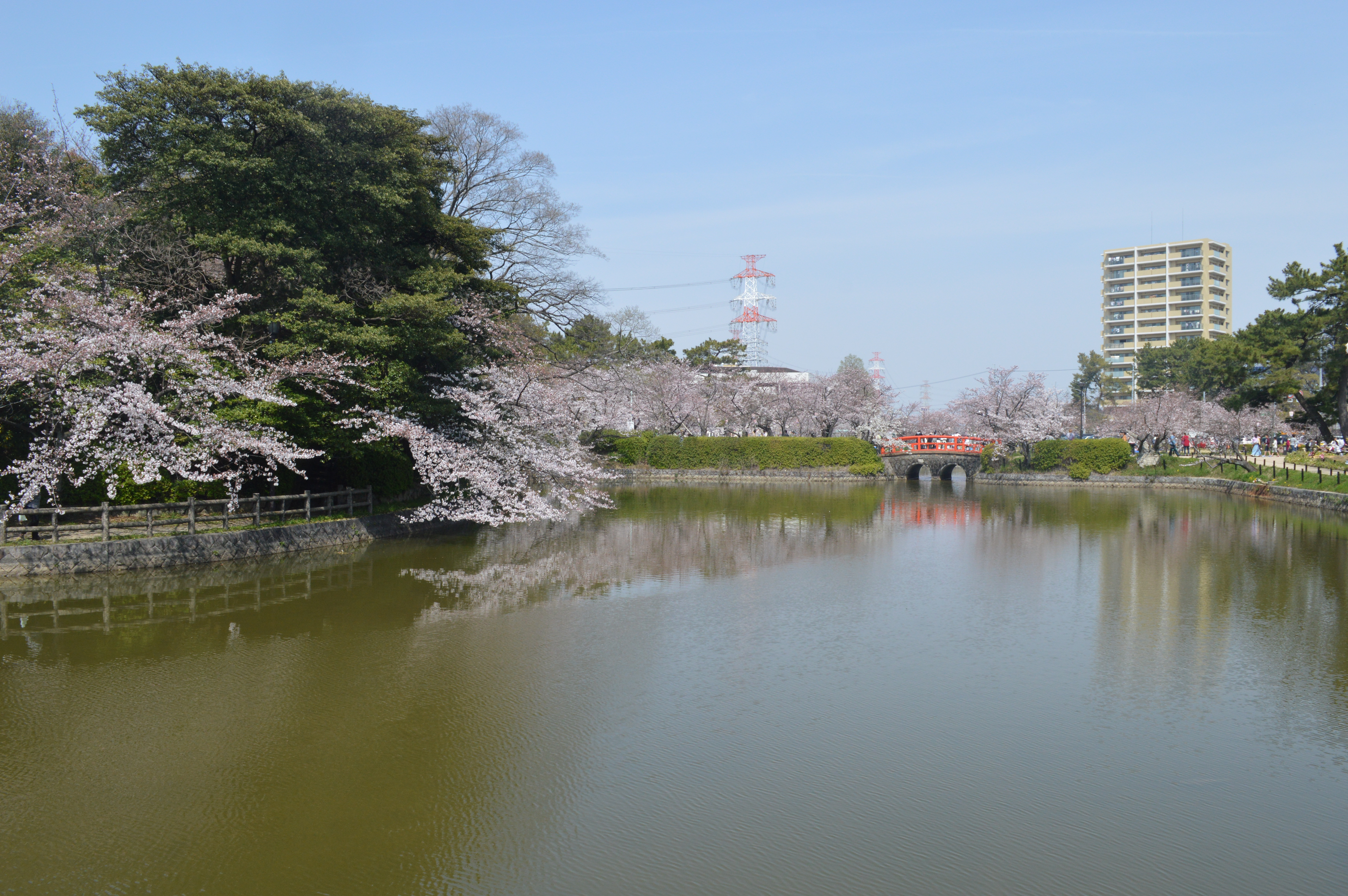
Kijo Park

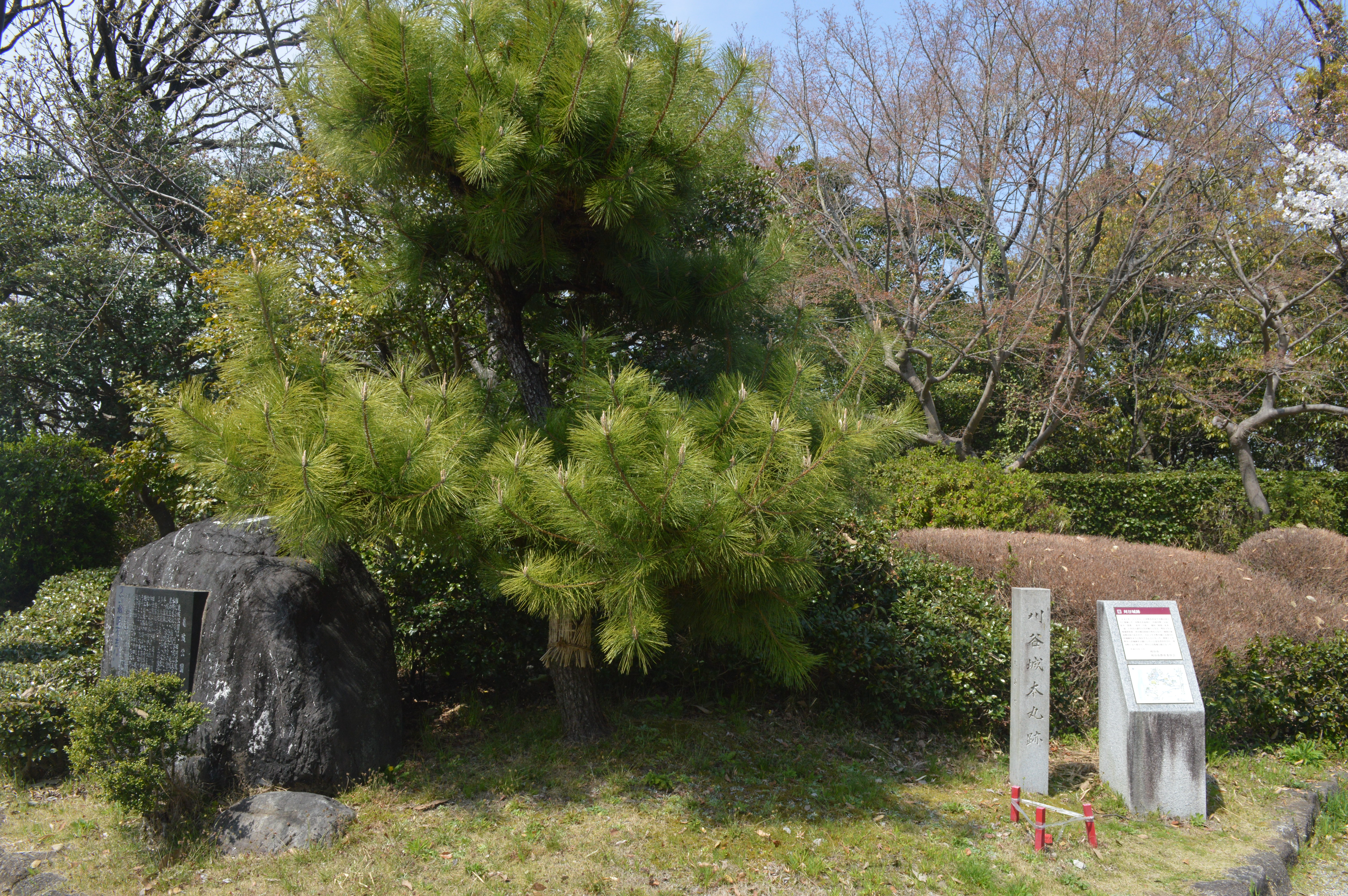
Kariya castle

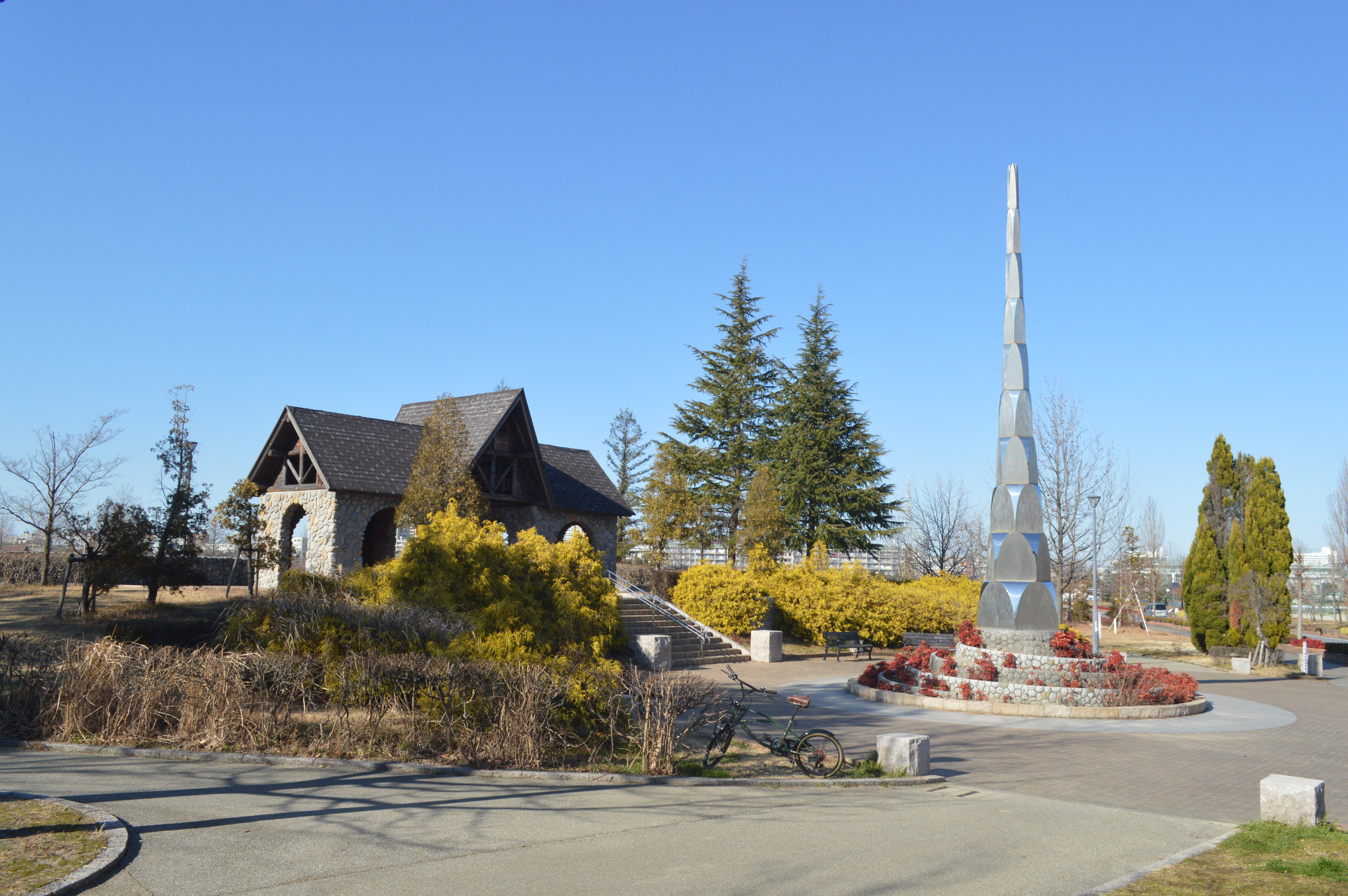
Mississauga Park

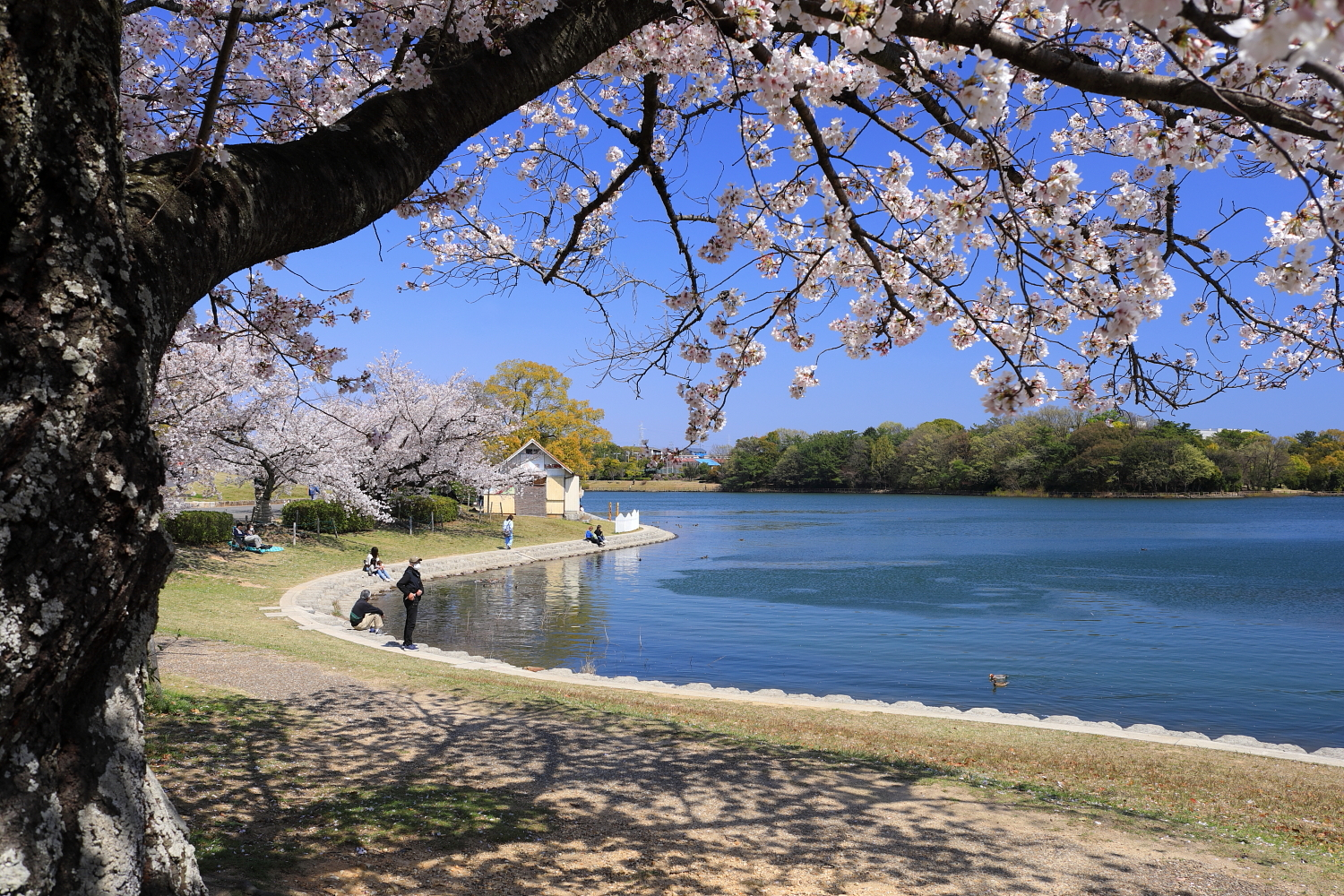
Suhara Park

== Notable people from Kariya ==
- Norihiro Akahoshi, professional baseball player
- On Kawara, artist
- Koji Kondo, professional soccer player
- Nikita Moiseev, professional baseball player
- Nobuyuki Sato, marathon runner
- Mitsunori Yoshida, professional soccer player
