= 1950 Emperor's Cup final =

1950 Emperor's Cup Final
All Kwangaku	Keio University
6	1
- Date: June 4, 1950
- Venue: Kariya Stadium, Aichi

1950 Emperor's Cup Final was the 30th final of the Emperor's Cup competition. The final was played at Kariya Stadium in Aichi on June 4, 1950. All Kwangaku won the championship.

== Overview ==
All Kwangaku won the championship, by defeating Keio University 6–1.

== Match details ==
June 4, 1950

All Kwangaku	6–1	Keio University
? ?' ? ?' ? ?' ? ?' ? ?' ? ?'		? ?'

Kariya Stadium

== See also ==
- 1950 Emperor's Cup
