= Aizuma Station =

Railway station in Kariya, Aichi Prefecture, Japan

CA59 Aizuma Station 逢妻駅
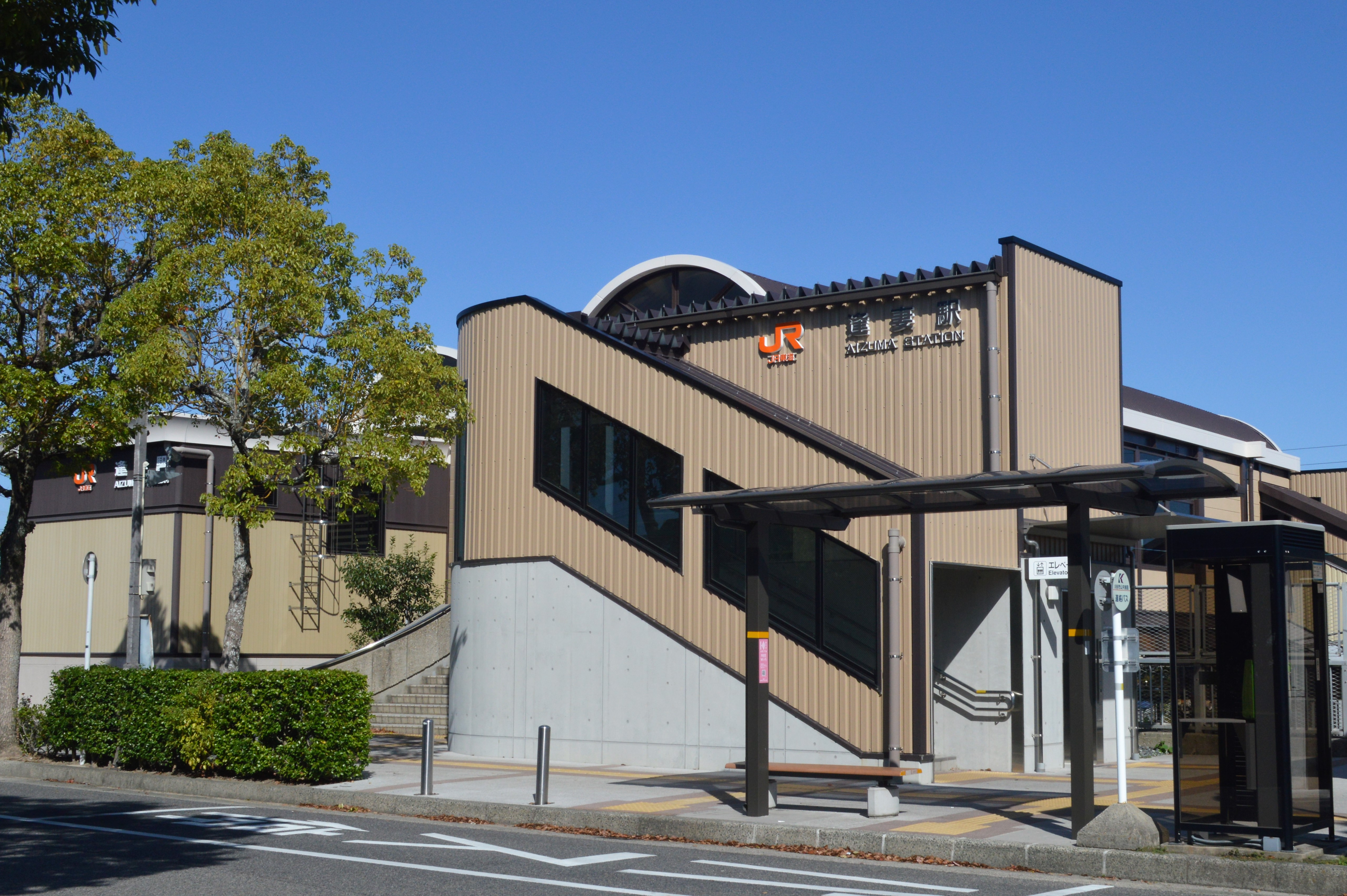
- Aizuma Station south exit, November 2018

General information
- Location: 2-77 Kumano-chō, Kariya-shi, Aichi-ken 448-0831; Japan
- Coordinates: 34.9983°N 136.9907°E
- Operator: JR Central
- Line: Tokaido Main Line
- Distance: 343.5 kilometers from Tokyo
- Platforms: 2 side platforms

Other information
- Status: Staffed
- Station code: CA59

History
- Opened: March 13, 1988

Passengers
- 2023–2024: 4,668 daily
Location
- Location within Aichi Prefecture Location within Japan

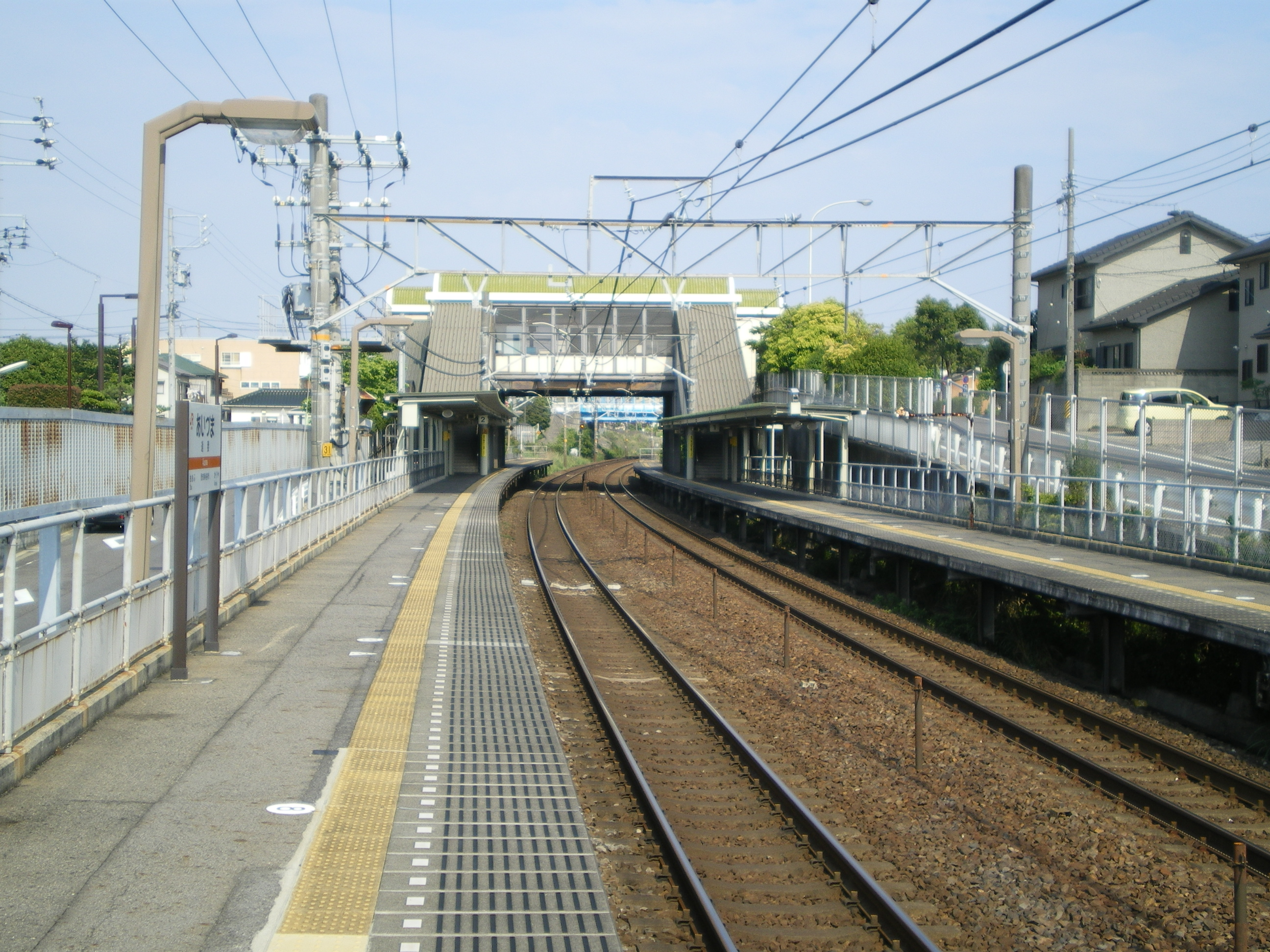
Aizuma Station platforms

Aizuma Station (逢妻駅, Aizuma-eki) is a railway station in the city of Kariya, Aichi Prefecture, Japan, operated by Central Japan Railway Company (JR Tōkai).

== Lines ==
Aizuma Station is served by the Tōkaidō Main Line, and is located 343.5 kilometers from the starting point of the line at Tokyo Station.

== Station layout ==
The station has two opposed side platforms connected by a footbridge. The station building has automated ticket machines, TOICA automated turnstiles and is staffed.

=== Platforms ===
1	■ Tōkaidō Main Line	For Nagoya and Ōgaki
2	■ Tōkaidō Main Line	For Okazaki and Toyohashi

== Adjacent stations ==
«	Service	»
Central Japan Railway Company
Tōkaidō Main Line
Special Rapid: Does not stop at this station
New Rapid: Does not stop at this station
Rapid: Does not stop at this station
Sectional Rapid: Does not stop at this station
Kariya	Local	Ōbu

== Station history ==
Aizuma Station was opened on 13 March 1988.

Station numbering was introduced to the section of the Tōkaidō Line operated JR Central in March 2018; Aizuma Station was assigned station number CA59.

== Passenger statistics ==
In fiscal 2017, the station was used by an average of 2386 passengers daily.

== Surrounding area ==
- site of Kijō Castle
- Kariya Technical High School

== See also ==
- List of railway stations in Japan
