= Yosami Transmitting Station =

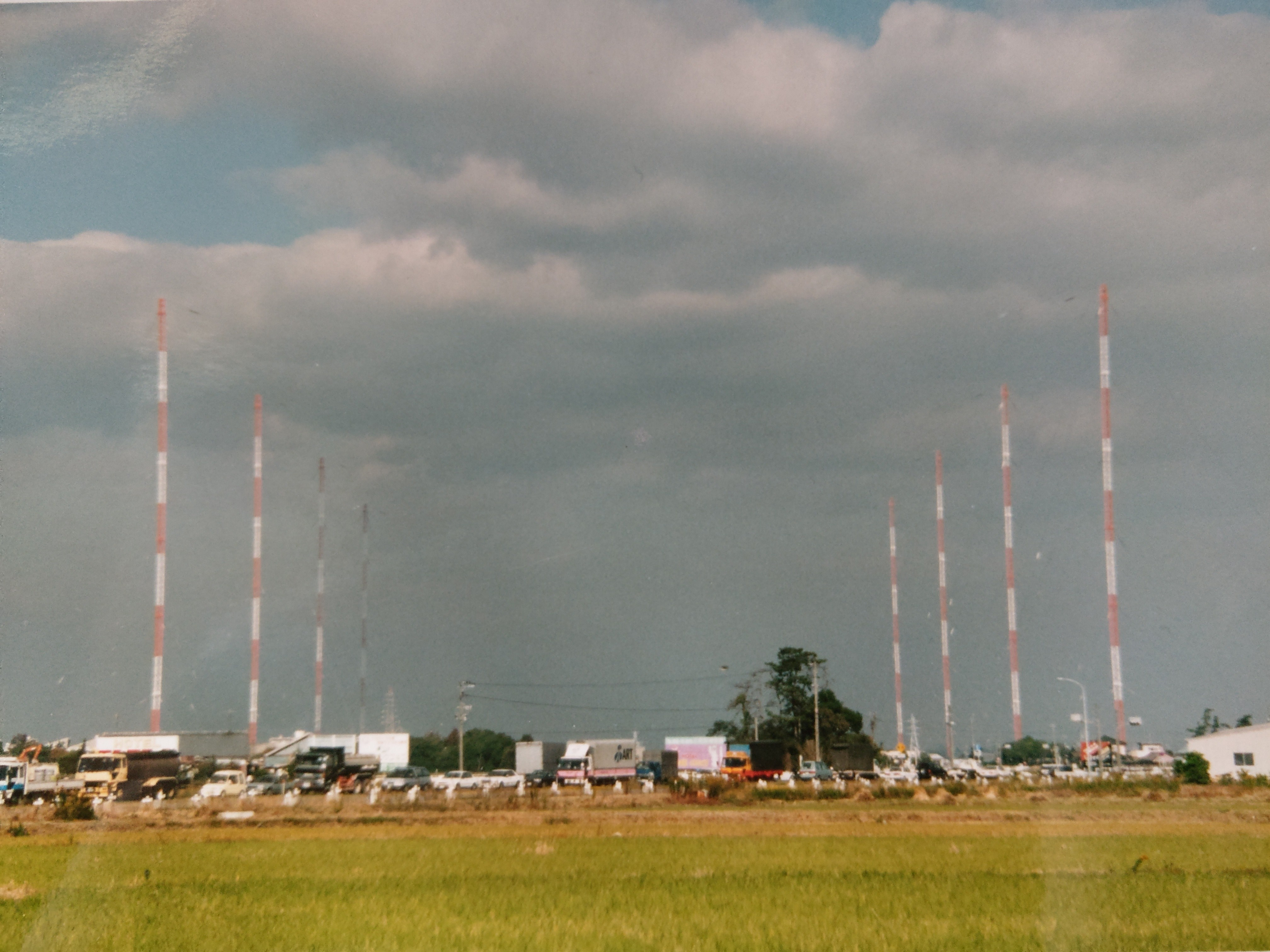

Location
- Coordinates: 34°58′20″N 137°00′59″E

Site history
- Built: 1929

Yosami Transmitting Station was a very large transmitting station for intercontinental communication and for submarine communication in the VLF-range at Kariya, Aichi, Japan. Yosami Transmitting Station used as antenna a wire antenna system, which was spun between 8 guyed masts, each 250 metres tall and insulated against ground. The masts of Yosami transmitting station were at its completion in 1929 Japan's tallest architectural structure. Yosami Transmitting Station played an important role in World War II for transmitting news to Germany and Italy and for transmitting messages to submarines under water.

After 1950 the transmitters were used by the US Navy. Although the masts were repainted in 1985, the station shut down in 1993 and became a beautiful flower park. However, the transmitter and building as well as the bottom section of one of the masts were moved and rebuilt as a museum a short way from the original site.

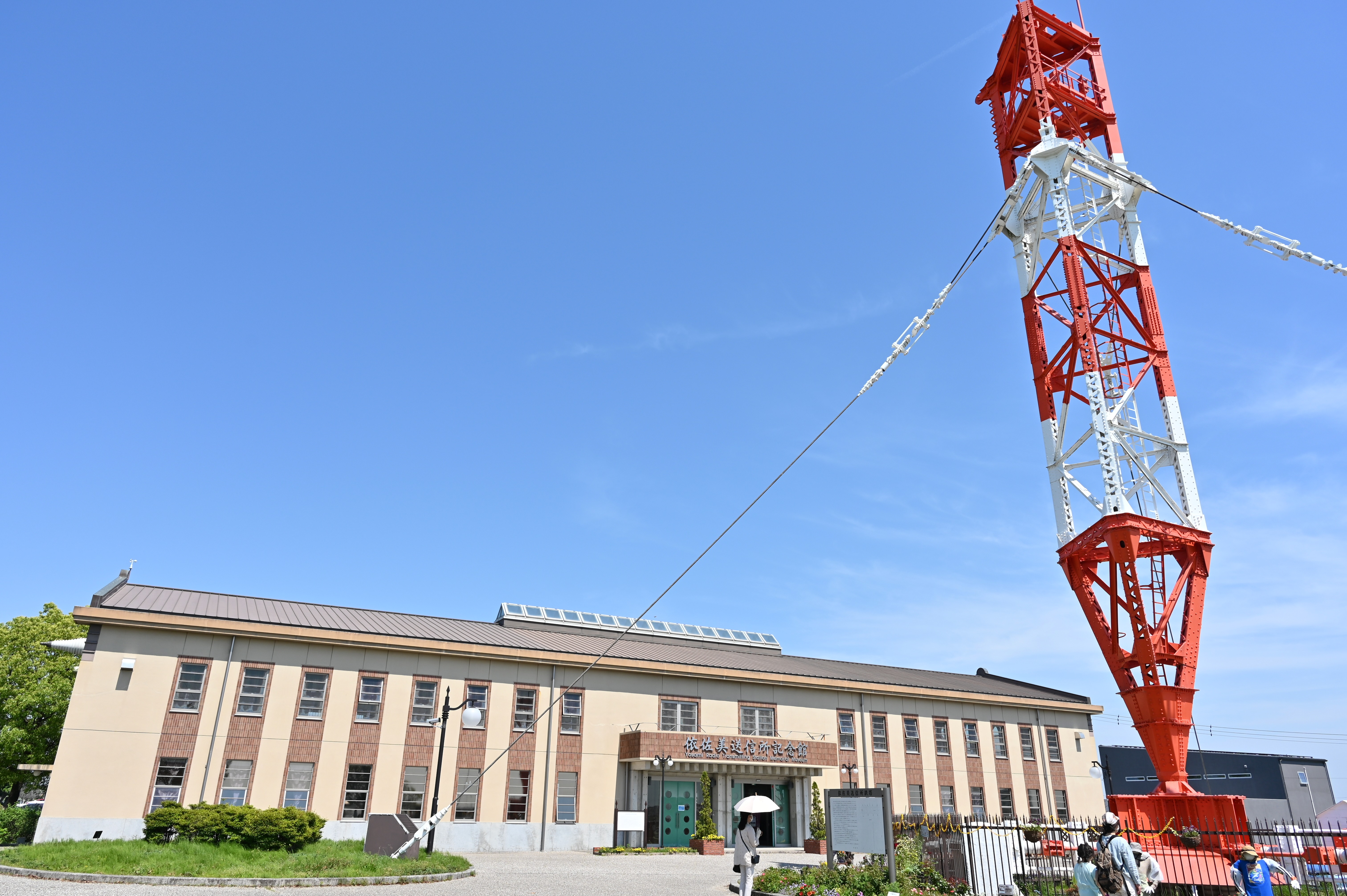
Yosami Radio Transmitting Station Memorial Museum
