= Dried turnip =

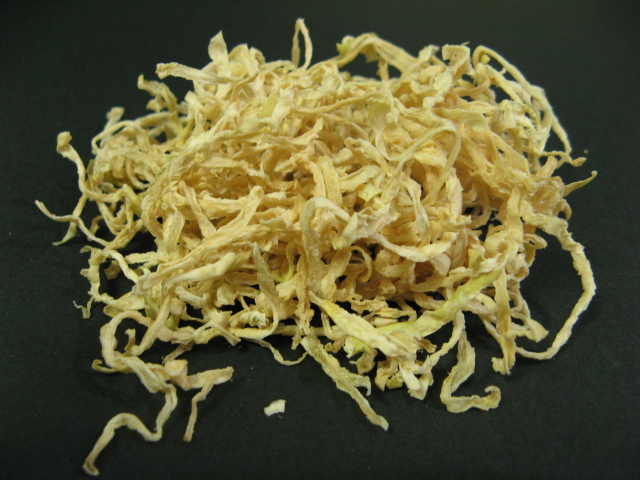
Dried radish

Dried turnip (dried radish) (simplified Chinese: 萝卜干; traditional Chinese: 蘿蔔乾; pinyin: luó bō gān; alternative simplified: 菜頭乾) is one kind of pickles in China, also a kind of vegetables with unique flavor. It is rich in both Vitamin B and iron.

== Procedure ==
Dried turnip is usually made around the winter solstice. Turnips are cleaned before solarization. Then the turnips are mixed with salt and put into a jar with a big rock upon them. One week later, turnips are taken out and dried in the sun again. Then the turnips are squeezed until no water can be squeezed. Next, turnips should are soaked in boiling brine. The turnips are again squeezed and dried in the sun until they become golden yellow. The last procedure is to put turnips into a clean jar. Half a year later, they can be tasted.

== Use ==
In China, people eat dried turnips when they are having porridge or noodles. It is regarded as an appetizer. The quality guarantee period of the dried turnip is months or even years. People are advised to pay attention to the amount of the dried turnip they eat because too much pickle is not good for health.
