= 1950 Emperor's Cup =

Tournament details
- Country: Japan

Final positions
- Champions: All Kwangaku
- Runners-up: Keio University
- Semifinalists: Waseda University; All Kansai University

Statistics of Emperor's Cup in the 1950 season.

== Overview ==
It was contested by 16 teams, and All Kwangaku won the championship.

== Results ==
=== 1st Round ===
- Waseda University WMW 4–2 Nagoya Soccer
- Nittetsu Futase – (retired) Sapporo Club
- Shiun Club 0–3 Kariya Soccer
- Urawa Club 0–4 All Kwangaku
- Keio University 4–0 Hiroshima Club
- Tohoku Representatives (retired) – Kyoto Club
- Toyama University Club 1–10 Shida Soccer
- Ogaki Soccer 1–5 All Kansai University

=== Quarterfinals ===
- Waseda University WMW 7–0 Nittetsu Futase
- Kariya Soccer 2–4 All Kwangaku
- Keio University 3–0 Kyoto Club
- Shida Soccer 1–2 All Kansai University

=== Semifinals ===
- Waseda University WMW 2–4 All Kwangaku
- Keio University 2–0 All Kansai University

=== Final ===
- All Kwangaku 6–1 Keio University

All Kwangaku won the championship.
