= DePaul Blue Demons men's basketball statistical leaders =

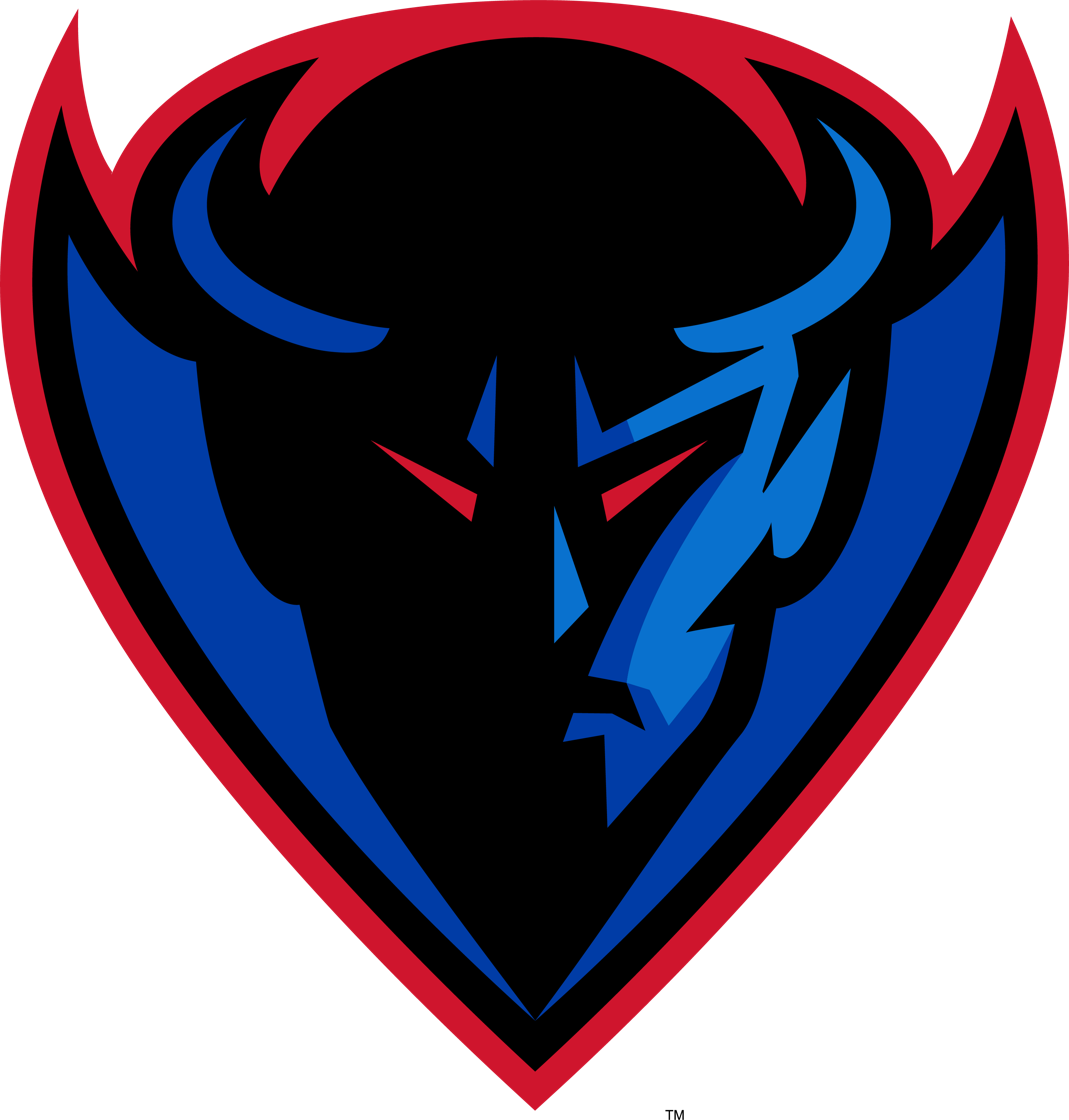
DePaul Blue Demons

The DePaul Blue Demons basketball statistical leaders are individual statistical leaders of the DePaul Blue Demons men's basketball program in various categories, including points, rebounds, assists, steals, and blocks. Within those areas, the lists identify single-game, single-season, and career leaders. The Blue Demons represent DePaul University in the NCAA's Big East Conference.

DePaul began competing in intercollegiate basketball in 1923. However, the school's record book does not generally list records from before the 1950s, as records from before this period are often incomplete and inconsistent. Since scoring was much lower in this era, and teams played much fewer games during a typical season, it is likely that few or no players from this era would appear on these lists anyway.

The NCAA did not officially record assists as a stat until the 1983–84 season, and blocks and steals until the 1985–86 season, but DePaul's record books includes players in these stats before these seasons. These lists are updated through the end of the 2020–21 season.

== Scoring ==
Career
Rk	Player	Points	Seasons
1	Mark Aguirre	2,182	1978–79 1979–80 1980–81
2	David Booth	1,933	1988–89 1989–90 1990–91 1991–92
3	Brandon Young	1,899	2010–11 2011–12 2012–13 2013–14
4	Dave Corzine	1,896	1974–75 1975–76 1976–77 1977–78
5	George Mikan	1,870	1942–43 1943–44 1944–45 1945–46
6	Tom Kleinschmidt	1,837	1991–92 1992–93 1993–94 1994–95
7	Cleveland Melvin	1,792	2010–11 2011–12 2012–13 2013–14
8	Stephen Howard	1,691	1988–89 1989–90 1990–91 1991–92
9	Eli Cain	1,642	2015–16 2016–17 2017–18 2018–19
10	Billy Garrett Jr.	1,632	2013–14 2014–15 2015–16 2016–17

Season
Rk	Player	Points	Season
1	Mark Aguirre	767	1978–79
2	Mark Aguirre	749	1979–80
3	Max Strus	705	2018–19
4	Mark Aguirre	666	1980–81
5	Stanley Brundy	642	1988–89
6	Dave Corzine	630	1977–78
7	Terry Cummings	624	1981–82
8	Tom Kleinschmidt	599	1994–95
9	David Booth	592	1989–90
	Dar Tucker	592	2008–09

Single game
Rk	Player	Points	Season	Opponent
1	George Mikan	53	1944–45	Rhode Island
2	Stanley Brundy	47	1988–89	Loyola Marymount
	Mark Aguirre	47	1980–81	Maine
4	Dave Corzine	46	1977–78	Louisville
5	Mark Aguirre	45	1978–79	Loyola-Chicago
6	Max Strus	43	2018–19	St. John's
	Howie Carl	43	1960–61	Marquette
8	Stanley Brundy	41	1988–89	Loyola Marymount
	Mark Aguirre	41	1979–80	Loyola-Chicago
10	Sammy Mejia	40	2006–07	Northwestern State
	David Booth	40	1990–91	UCLA
	Mark Aguirre	40	1979–80	Illinois State
	Mark Aguirre	40	1979–80	LaSalle

== Rebounds ==
Career
Rk	Player	Rebounds	Seasons
1	Dave Corzine	1,151	1974–75 1975–76 1976–77 1977–78
2	M.C. Thompson	972	1960–61 1961–62 1962–63
3	Tyrone Corbin	893	1981–82 1982–83 1983–84 1984–85
4	Ken Warzynski	890	1967–68 1968–69 1969–70
5	Stephen Howard	883	1988–89 1989–90 1990–91 1991–92
6	Errol Palmer	874	1964–65 1965–66 1966–67
7	Terry Cummings	857	1979–80 1980–81 1981–82
8	Andre Brown	855	2000–01 2001–02 2002–03 2003–04
9	Stanley Brundy	835	1985–86 1986–87 1987–88 1988–89
10	Curtis Watkins	810	1975–76 1976–77 1977–78 1978–79

Season
Rk	Player	Rebounds	Season
1	Ken Warzynski	379	1969–70
2	M.C. Thompson	354	1961–62
3	Dave Corzine	340	1977–78
4	Dave Corzine	339	1976–77
5	Bill Robinzine	338	1974–75
6	Stanley Brundy	336	1988–89
7	Terry Cummings	334	1981–82
8	M.C. Thompson	333	1960–61
9	Quentin Richardson	327	1998–99
10	Quentin Richardson	325	1999–00

Single game
Rk	Player	Rebounds	Season	Opponent
1	Ken Warzynski	28	1969–70	Harvard
2	Andre Brown	27	2001–02	TCU
3	Errol Palmer	25	1964–65	Notre Dame
4	Stanley Brundy	23	1988–89	Loyola Marymount
5	Mac Koshwal	22	2008–09	Creighton
	Ken Warzynski	22	1969–70	John F. Kennedy
7	Will Macon	21	1994–95	Marquette
	Bill Robinzine	21	1974–75	Manhattan
	Ken Warzynski	21	1969–70	Missouri-St. Louis
	Ken Warzynski	21	1969–70	Parsons
	Ken Warzynski	21	1969–70	E. Tennessee State
	Tom Hunter	21	1968–69	Illinois Wesleyan
	Ron Sobieszczyk	21	1955–56	Manhattan

== Assists ==
Career
Rk	Player	Assists	Seasons
1	Kenny Patterson	669	1981–82 1982–83 1983–84 1984–85
2	Clyde Bradshaw	606	1977–78 1978–79 1979–80 1980–81
3	Rod Strickland	557	1985–86 1986–87 1987–88
4	Brandon Young	521	2010–11 2011–12 2012–13 2013–14
5	Terence Greene	449	1985–86 1986–87 1987–88 1988–89
6	Rashon Burno	439	1998–99 1999–00 2000–01 2001–02
7	Billy Garrett Jr.	432	2013–14 2014–15 2015–16 2016–17
8	Eli Cain	405	2015–16 2016–17 2017–18 2018–19
9	Sammy Mejia	396	2003–04 2004–05 2005–06 2006–07
10	Tom Kleinschmidt	386	1991–92 1992–93 1993–94 1994–95

Season
Rk	Player	Assists	Season
1	Clyde Bradshaw	215	1979–80
2	Rod Strickland	201	1987–88
3	Kenny Patterson	201	1984–85
4	Charlie Moore	196	2019–20
	Rod Strickland	196	1986–87
6	Kenny Patterson	189	1983–84
7	Clyde Bradshaw	188	1980–81
	Gary Garland	188	1978–79
9	Kenny Patterson	187	1982–83
10	Imari Sawyer	179	2000–01

Single game
Rk	Player	Assists	Season	Opponent
1	Imari Sawyer	17	2001–02	Youngstown State
2	Kenny Patterson	15	1984–85	Syracuse
3	Rashon Burno	14	1999–00	UNC Charlotte
	Terence Greene	14	1985–86	Northern Iowa
	Clyde Bradshaw	14	1979–80	Loyola-Chicago
6	Charlie Moore	13	2019–20	Central Michigan
	Cliff Clinkscales	13	2006–07	Chaminade
	Cliff Clinkscales	13	2004–05	Illinois-Chicago
	Rod Strickland	13	1987–88	Wichita State
	Rod Strickland	13	1986–87	South Florida
	Kenny Patterson	13	1984–85	Indiana State
	Kenny Patterson	13	1984–85	Louisville

== Steals ==
Career
Rk	Player	Steals	Seasons
1	Kenny Patterson	280	1981–82 1982–83 1983–84 1984–85
2	Rod Strickland	204	1985–86 1986–87 1987–88
3	Rashon Burno	201	1998–99 1999–00 2000–01 2001–02
4	Brandon Young	188	2010–11 2011–12 2012–13 2013–14
5	Stanley Brundy	167	1985–86 1986–87 1987–88 1988–89
6	David Booth	165	1988–89 1989–90 1990–91 1991–92
7	Jeremiah Kelly	152	2008–09 2009–10 2010–11 2011–12
	Will Walker	152	2006–07 2007–08 2008–09 2009–10
	Willie Coleman	152	1997–98 1998–99
10	Peter Patton	149	1992–93 1993–94 1994–95 1995–96

Season
Rk	Player	Steals	Season
1	Gary Garland	124	1978–79
2	Willie Coleman	100	1997–98
3	Rashon Burno	80	1999–00
4	Kenny Patterson	79	1984–85
	Clyde Bradshaw	79	1980–81
6	Kenny Patterson	77	1982–83
7	Jermaine Watts	75	1995–96
	Rod Strickland	75	1987–88
9	Rod Strickland	69	1985–86
10	Kevin Edwards	68	1987–88
	Kenny Patterson	68	1983–84

Single game
Rk	Player	Steals	Season	Opponent
1	Gary Garland	10	1978–79	USC
2	Willie Coleman	9	1997–98	Louisville
3	Mac Koshwal	8	2009–10	Rutgers
	Rod Strickland	8	1987–88	UTSA
	Terry Cummings	8	1981–82	Maine
6	Paul Reed	7	2019–20	Xavier
	Willie Coleman	7	1997–98	Tulane
	Willie Coleman	7	1997–98	Saint Louis
	Willie Coleman	7	1997–98	Northwestern
	Rod Strickland	7	1986–87	Marquette
	Kenny Patterson	7	1984–85	Northern Illinois
	Skip Dillard	7	1979–80	Valparaiso
	Mark Aguirre	7	1979–80	North Texas State
	Clyde Bradshaw	7	1979–80	Northwestern
	Gary Garland	7	1978–79	Butler

== Blocks ==
Career
Rk	Player	Blocks	Seasons
1	Dallas Comegys	297	1983–84 1984–85 1985–86 1986–87
2	George Mikan	154	1942–43 1943–44 1944–45 1945–46
3	Paul Reed	142	2017–18 2018–19 2019–20
4	Nick Ongenda	135	2019–20 2020–21 2021–22 2022–23
5	Cleveland Melvin	131	2010–11 2011–12 2012–13 2013–14
6	Steven Hunter	128	1999–00 2000–01
7	Jeff Stern	121	1990–91 1991–92
8	Stanley Brundy	118	1985–86 1986–87 1987–88 1988–89
9	David Booth	113	1988–89 1989–90 1990–91 1991–92
10	Walter Downing	105	1981–82 1982–83

Season
Rk	Player	Blocks	Season
1	Dallas Comegys	108	1986–87
2	Dallas Comegys	79	1983–84
3	Paul Reed	74	2019–20
4	Steven Hunter	72	2000–01
5	Jeff Stern	61	1990–91
6	Dallas Comegys	59	1985–86
7	Jeff Stern	57	1991–92
8	Steven Hunter	56	1999–00
	Walter Downing	56	1982–83
10	Paul Reed	55	2018–19

Single game
Rk	Player	Blocks	Season	Opponent
1	Dallas Comegys	10	1986–87	Dayton
2	Nick Ongenda	8	2022–23	St. John's
	Nick Ongenda	8	2021–22	Louisville
	Paul Reed	8	2019–20	Minnesota
	Donnavan Kirk	8	2011–12	Providence
	Walter Downing	8	1982–83	Nebraska
	Steven Hunter	8	2000–01	Houston
8	Jeff Stern	7	1990–91	Texas
	Steven Hunter	7	2000–01	Memphis
	Nick Ongenda	7	2021–22	Providence
