= 1985–86 DePaul Blue Demons men's basketball team =

American college basketball season

1985–86 DePaul Blue Demons men's basketball
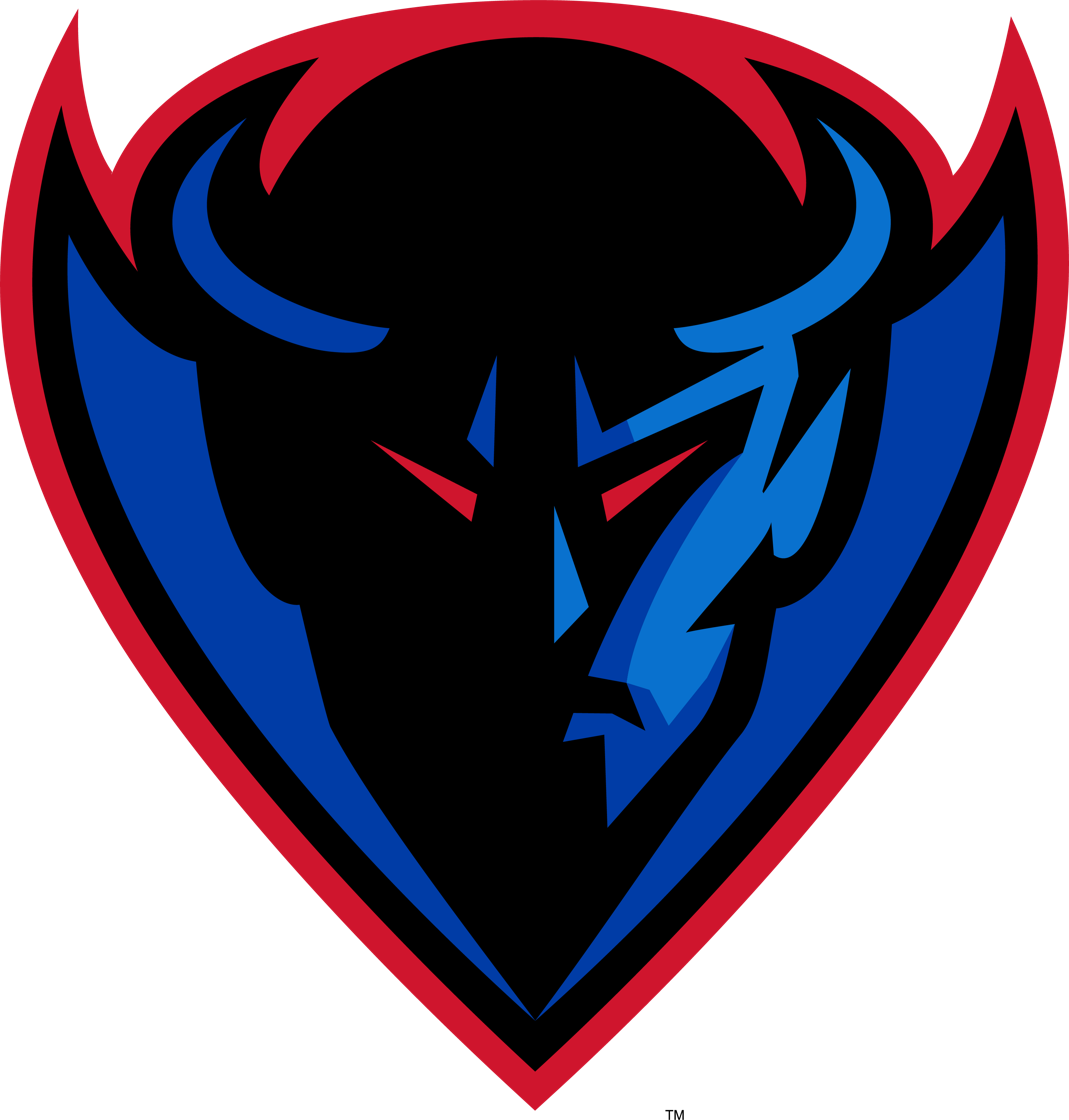

NCAA tournament, Sweet Sixteen
- Conference: Independent
- Record: 18–13
- Head coach: Joey Meyer (2nd season)
- Assistant coaches: Jim Molinari (7th season); Jim Platt (2nd season)
- Home arena: Rosemont Horizon

1985–86 NCAA Division I men's basketball independents standings
| | Conf. | | | | Overall |
| Team | W | | L | PCT | W | | L | PCT |
|---|---|---|---|---|---|---|---|---|
| No. 10 Notre Dame | - | – | - | – | 23 | – | 6 | .793 |
| Chicago State | - | – | - | – | 22 | – | 6 | .786 |
| Eastern Washington | - | – | - | – | 20 | – | 8 | .714 |
| Texas–Pan American | - | – | - | – | 20 | – | 8 | .714 |
| Marquette | - | – | - | – | 19 | – | 11 | .633 |
| DePaul | - | – | - | – | 18 | – | 13 | .581 |
| New Orleans | - | – | - | – | 16 | – | 12 | .571 |
| Dayton | - | – | - | – | 17 | – | 13 | .567 |
| Southwestern Louisiana | - | – | - | – | 15 | – | 13 | .536 |
| Miami (Fla.) | - | – | - | – | 14 | – | 14 | .500 |
| Tennessee State | - | – | - | – | 14 | – | 14 | .500 |
| Utica | - | – | - | – | 13 | – | 14 | .481 |
| Florida A&M | - | – | - | – | 12 | – | 16 | .429 |
| Brooklyn | - | – | - | – | 9 | – | 22 | .290 |
| U.S. International | - | – | - | – | 8 | – | 20 | .286 |
| Texas–San Antonio | - | – | - | – | 7 | – | 24 | .226 |
| Central Florida | - | – | - | – | 6 | – | 22 | .214 |
Rankings from AP Poll

The 1985–86 DePaul Blue Demons men's basketball team represented DePaul University during the 1985–86 NCAA Division I men's basketball season. They were led by head coach Joey Meyer, in his 2nd season at the school, and played their home games at the Rosemont Horizon in Rosemont.

After finishing the regular season at 16–12, DePaul received a bid to the 1986 NCAA Tournament as the No. 12 seed in the East region. DePaul beat Virginia in the opening round and Oklahoma in the round of 32 to advance to the Sweet Sixteen. In the East Regional semifinals, the Blue Demons were defeated by No. 1 Duke, 74–67, and finished the season 18–13.

== Roster ==
1985–86 DePaul Blue Demons men's basketball team
Players
Coaches

| Pos. | # | Name | Height | Weight | Year | Previous school | Hometown |
|---|---|---|---|---|---|---|---|
| G | 10 | Rod Strickland | 6 ft 3 in (1.91 m) | 175 lb (79 kg) | Fr | Oak Hill Academy | Bronx, NY |
| G | 13 | Terence Greene | 6 ft 4 in (1.93 m) | 190 lb (86 kg) | Fr | Flint Central | Flint, MI |
| G | 14 | Andy Laux | 6 ft 5 in (1.96 m) | 195 lb (88 kg) | So | Immaculate Conception | Elmhurst, IL |
| G | 20 | Tony Jackson | 6 ft 5 in (1.96 m) | 200 lb (91 kg) | Sr | Bishop O'Dowd | San Francisco, CA |
| F | 23 | Stanley Brundy | 6 ft 6 in (1.98 m) | 205 lb (93 kg) | Fr | Crenshaw | Los Angeles, CA |
| C | 32 | Lemone Lampley | 6 ft 11 in (2.11 m) | 210 lb (95 kg) | Sr | Chicago Vocational | Chicago, IL |
| G | 33 | Marvin Woods | 6 ft 4 in (1.93 m) | 190 lb (86 kg) | So | Aliquippa | Aliquippa, PA |
| F | 34 | Kevin Holmes | 6 ft 8 in (2.03 m) | 225 lb (102 kg) | Sr | Cleveland | Los Angeles, CA |
| F | 35 | Dallas Comegys | 6 ft 9 in (2.06 m) | 205 lb (93 kg) | Jr | Roman Catholic | Philadelphia, PA |
| C | 51 | Marty Embry | 6 ft 9 in (2.06 m) | 250 lb (113 kg) | Sr | Flint Central | Flint, MI |
| F | 55 | Kevin Golden | 6 ft 9 in (2.06 m) | 205 lb (93 kg) | So | Lumen Christi | Jackson, MI |

Head coach

- Joey Meyer

Assistant coach(es)

- Jim Molinari (Illinois Wesleyan)
- Jim Platt (Concordia (IL))

Legend

- (C) Team captain
- (S) Suspended
- (I) Ineligible
- (W) Walk-on
- Injured
- Current redshirt

Roster

== Schedule and results ==
| Date time, TV | Rank^{#} | Opponent^{#} | Result | Record | Site city, state |
Regular season
| Nov 30, 1985* | | at Northern Illinois | W 63–61 | 1–0 | Chick Evans Fieldhouse (5,757); DeKalb, Illinois |
| Dec 4, 1985* | | St. Francis (NY) | W 93–48 | 2–0 | Rosemont Horizon (8,543); Rosemont, Illinois |
| Dec 7, 1985* | | Illinois State | W 71–64 | 3–0 | Rosemont Horizon (14,377); Rosemont, Illinois |
| Dec 10, 1985* | No. 19 | Western Michigan | W 70–59 | 4–0 | Rosemont Horizon (8,123); Rosemont, Illinois |
| Dec 12, 1985* | No. 18 | at Houston | W 84–78 | 5–0 | Hofheinz Pavilion (4,930); Houston, Texas |
| Dec 19, 1985* | No. 18 | at Northwestern | W 70–67 | 6–0 | Welsh-Ryan Arena (8,117); Evanston, Illinois |
| Dec 21, 1985* | No. 18 | No. 5 Georgetown | L 70–85 | 6–1 | Rosemont Horizon (17,259); Rosemont, Illinois |
| Dec 23, 1985* | No. 20 | at Purdue | L 56–71 | 6–2 | Mackey Arena (14,003); West Lafayette, Indiana |
| Dec 27, 1985* | No. 20 | vs. Navy; Cotton States Classic | L 64–67 | 6–3 | The Omni (14,010); Atlanta, Georgia |
| Dec 28, 1985* | No. 20 | vs. Texas; Cotton States Classic | W 63–62 | 7–3 | The Omni (15,130); Atlanta, Georgia |
| Jan 4, 1986* | | Dayton | W 66–52 | 8–3 | Rosemont Horizon (12,731); Rosemont, Illinois |
| Jan 9, 1986* | | Pepperdine | W 70–57 | 9–3 | Rosemont Horizon (9,876); Rosemont, Illinois |
| Jan 11, 1986* | | No. 16 Notre Dame | L 54–70 | 9–4 | Rosemont Horizon (17,093); Rosemont, Illinois |
| Jan 15, 1986* | | Cleveland State | L 75–90 | 9–5 | Rosemont Horizon (7,384); Rosemont, Illinois |
| Jan 18, 1986* | | No. 12 UAB | W 70–61 | 10–5 | Rosemont Horizon (12,591); Rosemont, Illinois |
| Jan 21, 1986* | | Loyola–Chicago | W 90–55 | 11–5 | Rosemont Horizon (11,593); Rosemont, Illinois |
| Jan 29, 1986* | | Northern Iowa | W 96–53 | 12–5 | Rosemont Horizon (6,739); Rosemont, Illinois |
| Feb 1, 1986* | | at Dayton | L 64–77 | 12–6 | University of Dayton Arena (12,893); Dayton, Ohio |
| Feb 4, 1986* | | Evansville | W 73–41 | 13–6 | Rosemont Horizon (6,903); Rosemont, Illinois |
| Feb 8, 1986* | | at Marquette | L 65–70 | 13–7 | MECCA Arena (11,052); Milwaukee, Wisconsin |
| Feb 11, 1986* | | at Old Dominion | L 53–66 | 13–8 | Norfolk Scope (8,542); Norfolk, Virginia |
| Feb 15, 1986* | | No. 19 Louisville | L 53–72 | 13–9 | Rosemont Horizon (15,754); Rosemont, Illinois |
| Feb 17, 1986* | | at Creighton | L 61–74 | 13–10 | Omaha Civic Auditorium (5,828); Omaha, Nebraska |
| Feb 19, 1986* | | at Indiana State | W 48–44 | 14–10 | Hulman Center (6,769); Terre Haute, Indiana |
| Feb 22, 1986* | | No. 6 St. John's | W 81–72 | 15–10 | Rosemont Horizon (13,921); Rosemont, Illinois |
| Feb 25, 1986* | | at No. 12 Notre Dame | L 59–70 | 15–11 | Joyce Center (11,345); Notre Dame, Indiana |
| Mar 1, 1986* | | at UCLA | L 63–65 | 15–12 | Pauley Pavilion (7,235); Los Angeles, California |
| Mar 8, 1986* | | Marquette | W 95–87 | 16–12 | Rosemont Horizon (15,331); Rosemont, Illinois |
NCAA Tournament
| Mar 13, 1986* | (12 E) | vs. (5 E) Virginia; First round | W 72–68 | 17–12 | Greensboro Coliseum (7,640); Greensboro, North Carolina |
| Mar 15, 1986* | (12 E) | vs. (4 E) No. 15 Oklahoma; Second round | W 74–69 | 18–12 | Greensboro Coliseum (12,096); Greensboro, North Carolina |
| Mar 21, 1986* | (12 E) | vs. (1 E) No. 1 Duke; East Regional semifinal – Sweet Sixteen | L 67–74 | 18–13 | Brendan Byrne Arena (19,454); East Rutherford, New Jersey |
*Non-conference game. ^{#}Rankings from AP Poll. (#) Tournament seedings in parentheses. E=East.

== Team players drafted into the NBA ==
| Round | Pick | Player | NBA Club |
|---|---|---|---|
| 2 | 38 | Lemone Lampley | Seattle SuperSonics |
