= 1986–87 DePaul Blue Demons men's basketball team =

American college basketball season

1986–87 DePaul Blue Demons men's basketball
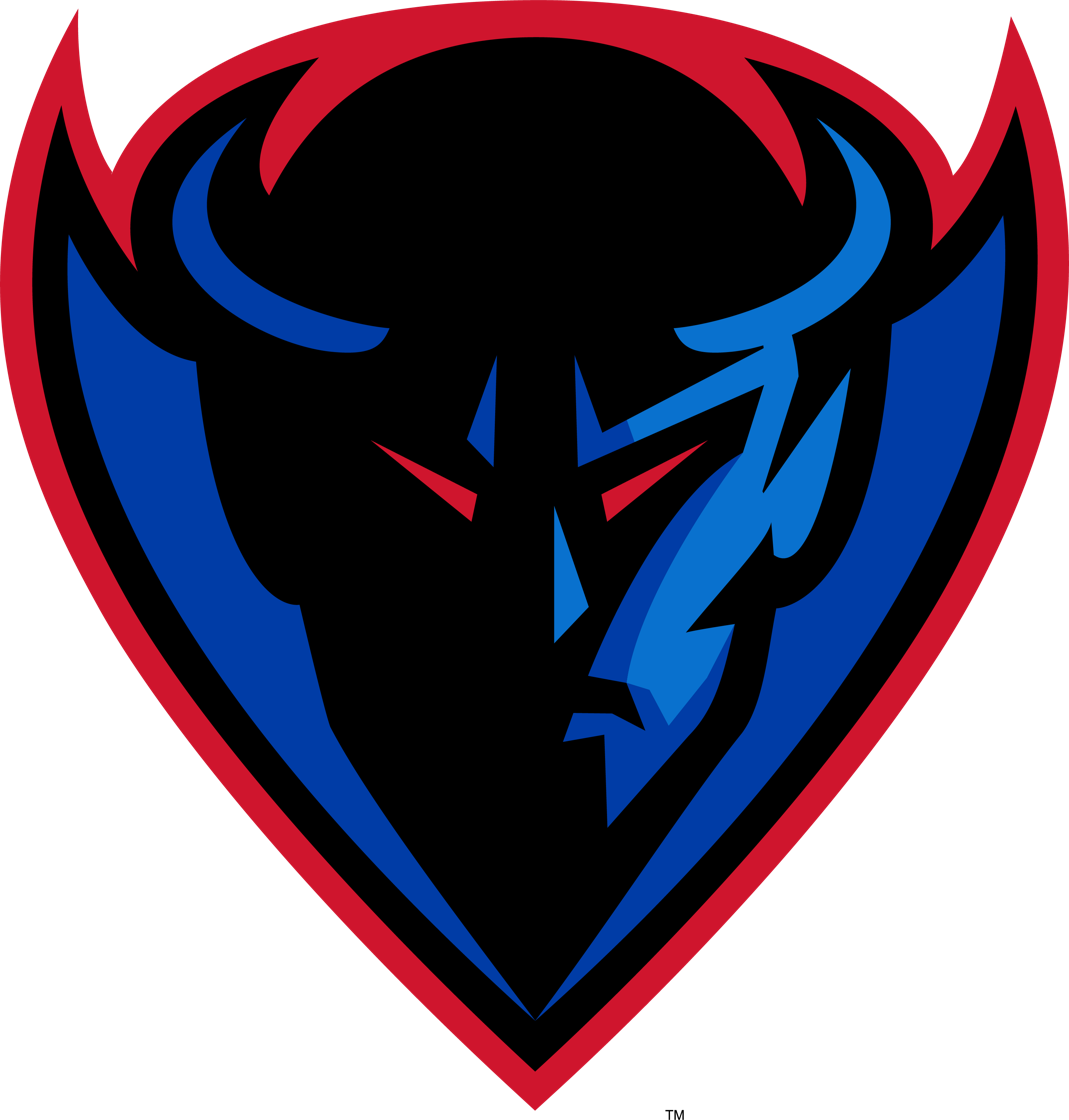

NCAA tournament, Sweet Sixteen
- Conference: Independent

Ranking
- Coaches: No. 5
- AP: No. 5
- Record: 28–3
- Head coach: Joey Meyer (3rd season)
- Assistant coaches: Jim Molinari (8th season); Jim Platt (3rd season); Dwayne Tyus
- Home arena: Rosemont Horizon

1986–87 NCAA Division I men's basketball independents standings
	Conf.				Overall
Team	W		L	PCT	W		L	PCT
No. 5 DePaul	-	–	-	–	28	–	3	.903
No. 16 New Orleans	-	–	-	–	26	–	4	.867
No. 18 Notre Dame	-	–	-	–	24	–	8	.750
Texas–Pan American	-	–	-	–	16	–	12	.571
Tennessee State	-	–	-	–	15	–	12	.556
Marquette	-	–	-	–	16	–	13	.552
Miami (FL)	-	–	-	–	15	–	16	.484
Dayton	-	–	-	–	13	–	15	.464
Central Florida	-	–	-	–	12	–	15	.444
UMBC	-	–	-	–	12	–	15	.444
Chicago State	-	–	-	–	11	–	17	.393
Southwestern Louisiana	-	–	-	–	11	–	17	.393
U.S. International	-	–	-	–	11	–	17	.393
Utica	-	–	-	–	10	–	16	.385
Brooklyn	-	–	-	–	10	–	18	.357
Northern Illinois	-	–	-	–	9	–	19	.321
Central Connecticut State	-	–	-	–	8	–	21	.276
Eastern Washington	-	–	-	–	5	–	23	.179
Rankings from AP Poll

The 1986–87 DePaul Blue Demons men's basketball team represented DePaul University during the 1986–87 NCAA Division I men's basketball season. They were led by head coach Joey Meyer, in his 3rd season at the school, and played their home games at the Rosemont Horizon in Rosemont.

After opening the season unranked in both major polls, the Blue Demons won their first 16 games and rose as high as No. 4 in the AP poll. DePaul received a bid to the 1987 NCAA Tournament as the No. 3 seed in the Midwest region. DePaul beat Louisiana Tech in the opening round and St. John's in the round of 32 to advance to the Sweet Sixteen. In the Midwest Regional semifinals, the Blue Demons were upset by LSU, 63–58, and finished the season 28–3 and ranked No. 5 in both major polls.

As of 2025, this is the last time DePaul has advanced to the Sweet Sixteen of the NCAA tournament. This appearance was vacated, however (as was 1986's), making their 1984 venture the last NCAA-recognized season with an appearance in that round.

== Roster ==
1986–87 DePaul Blue Demons men's basketball team
Players
Coaches

Pos.	#	Name	Height	Weight	Year	Previous school	Hometown
G	10	Rod Strickland	6 ft 3 in (1.91 m)	175 lb (79 kg)	So	Oak Hill Academy	Bronx, NY
G	13	Terence Greene	6 ft 4 in (1.93 m)	190 lb (86 kg)	So	Flint Central	Flint, MI
G	14	Andy Laux	6 ft 5 in (1.96 m)	195 lb (88 kg)	Jr	Immaculate Conception	Elmhurst, IL
F	15	Kevin Holland	6 ft 7 in (2.01 m)	215 lb (98 kg)	Fr	Cerritos	Cerritos, CA
G	20	Kevin Edwards	6 ft 3 in (1.91 m)	185 lb (84 kg)	Jr	Lakeland CC	Cleveland, OH
F	23	Stanley Brundy	6 ft 6 in (1.98 m)	205 lb (93 kg)	So	Crenshaw	Los Angeles, CA
F/C	34	Charles Sowell	6 ft 9 in (2.06 m)	230 lb (104 kg)	Fr	E. E. Smith	Fayetteville, NC
F/C	35	Dallas Comegys	6 ft 9 in (2.06 m)	205 lb (93 kg)	Sr	Roman Catholic	Philadelphia, PA
C	44	James Hamby	7 ft 0 in (2.13 m)	230 lb (104 kg)	Fr	Elgin	Elgin, IL
F	45	James O'Shaughnessy	6 ft 7 in (2.01 m)	215 lb (98 kg)	Sr	Benet Academy	Naperville, IL
F	55	Kevin Golden	6 ft 9 in (2.06 m)	205 lb (93 kg)	Jr	Lumen Christi	Jackson, MI

Head coach

- Joey Meyer

Assistant coach(es)

- Jim Molinari (Illinois Wesleyan)
- Jim Platt (Concordia (IL))
- Dwayne Tyus

Legend

- (C) Team captain
- (S) Suspended
- (I) Ineligible
- (W) Walk-on
- Injured
- Current redshirt

Roster

== Schedule and results ==
Date time, TV	Rank^{#}	Opponent^{#}	Result	Record	Site city, state
Regular season
Nov 29, 1986*		Northern Illinois	W 78–51	1–0	Rosemont Horizon (9,978); Rosemont, Illinois
Dec 2, 1986*		UNC Wilmington	W 63–44	2–0	Rosemont Horizon (7,868); Rosemont, Illinois
Dec 6, 1986*		at Illinois State	W 61–53	3–0	Horton Field House (7,628); Normal, Illinois
Dec 10, 1986*		at Western Michigan	W 93–61	4–0	University Arena (5,384); Kalamazoo, Michigan
Dec 13, 1986*		at Louisville	W 75–68	5–0	Freedom Hall (19,198); Louisville, Kentucky
Dec 17, 1986*	No. 19	Creighton	W 74–64	6–0	Rosemont Horizon (9,225); Rosemont, Illinois
Dec 20, 1986*	No. 19	Old Dominion	W 72–61	7–0	Rosemont Horizon (9,254); Rosemont, Illinois
Dec 22, 1986*	No. 17	Northwestern	W 72–54	8–0	Rosemont Horizon (10,023); Rosemont, Illinois
Dec 30, 1986*	No. 15	at Pepperdine	W 92–75	9–0	Firestone Fieldhouse (3,104); Malibu, California
Jan 3, 1987*	No. 15	at Dayton	W 80–64	10–0	University of Dayton Arena (12,452); Dayton, Ohio
Jan 5, 1987*	No. 7	Furman	W 81–64	11–0	Rosemont Horizon (8,959); Rosemont, Illinois
Jan 10, 1987*	No. 7	Notre Dame	W 58–54	12–0	Rosemont Horizon (17,623); Rosemont, Illinois
Jan 15, 1987*	No. 7	at Loyola–Chicago	W 84–65	13–0	UIC Pavilion (8,232); Chicago, Illinois
Jan 17, 1987*	No. 7	South Florida	W 81–55	14–0	Rosemont Horizon (10,310); Rosemont, Illinois
Jan 19, 1987*	No. 6	Indiana State	W 61–49	15–0	Rosemont Horizon (8,827); Rosemont, Illinois
Jan 21, 1987*	No. 6	at Evansville	W 78–68	16–0	Roberts Stadium (9,640); Evansville, Indiana
Jan 25, 1987*	No. 6	at No. 15 Georgetown	L 71–74	16–1	Capital Centre (6,722); Washington, D.C.
Jan 27, 1987*	No. 8	Weber State	W 70–51	17–1	Rosemont Horizon (9,060); Rosemont, Illinois
Jan 31, 1987*	No. 8	at La Salle	W 58–54	18–1	The Palestra (8,117); Philadelphia, Pennsylvania
Feb 2, 1987*	No. 5	NC State	W 84–62	19–1	Rosemont Horizon (13,370); Rosemont, Illinois
Feb 7, 1987*	No. 5	Dayton	W 88–65	20–1	Rosemont Horizon (14,280); Rosemont, Illinois
Feb 10, 1987*	No. 5	at Marquette	W 88–76	21–1	MECCA Arena (11,052); Milwaukee, Wisconsin
Feb 14, 1987*	No. 5	at UAB	W 83–71	22–1	Birmingham-Jefferson Civic Center (8,352); Birmingham, Alabama
Feb 16, 1987*	No. 4	Monmouth	W 88–53	23–1	Rosemont Horizon (9,047); Rosemont, Illinois
Feb 18, 1987*	No. 4	vs. Iona	W 96–82	24–1	Madison Square Garden (10,228); New York, New York
Feb 22, 1987*	No. 4	Georgia Tech	W 84–67	25–1	Rosemont Horizon (15,656); Rosemont, Illinois
Feb 25, 1987*	No. 4	at Notre Dame	L 62–73	25–2	Joyce Center (11,418); Notre Dame, Indiana
Mar 7, 1987*	No. 5	Marquette	W 68–59	26–2	Rosemont Horizon (16,369); Rosemont, Illinois
NCAA Tournament
Mar 13, 1987*	(5) No. 3 MW	vs. Louisiana Tech; First round	W 76–62	27–2	Rosemont Horizon (16,866); Rosemont, Illinois
Mar 15, 1987*	(5) No. 3 MW	vs. (6 MW) St. John's; Second round	W 83–75 ^{OT}	28–2	Rosemont Horizon (16,875); Rosemont, Illinois
Mar 20, 1987*	(5) No. 3 MW	vs. (10 MW) LSU; Midwest Regional semifinal – Sweet Sixteen	L 58–63	28–3	Riverfront Coliseum (16,902); Cincinnati, Ohio
*Non-conference game. ^{#}Rankings from AP Poll. (#) Tournament seedings in parentheses. MW=Midwest.

== Team players drafted into the NBA ==
Round	Pick	Player	NBA Club
1	21	Dallas Comegys	Atlanta Hawks
