= Peter Patton (basketball) =

American basketball player and coach (born 1974)

New York Knicks
- Title: Shooting coach
- League: NBA

Personal information
- Born: February 9, 1974 (age 52) Illinois, U.S.
- Listed height: 6 ft 1 in (1.85 m)

Career information
- High school: Loyola Academy (Wilmette, Illinois)
- College: DePaul (1992–1996)
- NBA draft: 1996: undrafted
- Playing career: 1996–1999
- Position: Guard
- Coaching career: 2016–present

Career history

Playing
- 1996: Carolina Cardinals
- 1996–1997: Dakota Wizards
- 1997–1998: Magic City Snowbears
- 1998–1999: Kandid Olimpija Osijek

Coaching
- 2016–2018: Minnesota Timberwolves (shooting)
- 2018–2023: Dallas Mavericks (shooting)
- 2023–2025: Chicago Bulls (player development)
- 2025–present: New York Knicks (shooting)

Career highlights
- All-IBA Second Team (1997); NBA Champion (2026)

Peter Patton (born February 9, 1974) is an American professional basketball coach and former basketball player. He currently serves as the shooting coach for the New York Knicks of the National Basketball Association (NBA). He has previously been a shooting coach in the NBA for the Minnesota Timberwolves and Dallas Mavericks.

He played college basketball for the DePaul Blue Demons before playing in the International Basketball Association and Croatia. He set the DePaul single-season three-point shooting percentage record. In high school, he was a highly touted multisport athlete who as a quarterback/punter was the Chicago Catholic League co-MVP in football after leading his high school football team to the Illinois High School Association (IHSA) semi-finals twice. He also played high school baseball and basketball.

== Early life ==
Patton states that he attended basketball camps from an early age. He attended a camp by Ray Meyer in Wisconsin as a sixth grader, earning the nickname General Patton. Meyer was the father of Joey Meyer who succeeded him as DePaul head coach. Patton also claims to have attended basketball camps at the University of Indiana from sixth grade through his high school freshman year.

== High school career ==
Patton attended Loyola Academy in Wilmette, Illinois. He played basketball, football and baseball at Loyola in the Chicago Catholic League. He was a gridiron football quarterback, basketball guard and baseball pitcher-first baseman who was regarded as one of the best three-sport athletes of his day in the Chicago metropolitan area.

As a sophomore he was the starting quarterback, point guard and pitcher for Loyola. As a junior, he led Loyola to the IHSA 1990 Class 6A football semi-finals where they lost to Thornton Township High School. After the season, he was mentioned as one of the three best football prospects (along with Chris Piggott and Bryan Jurewicz) in the Chicago area. In basketball, Loyola (18–10) lost in the IHSA 1991 Class AA basketball sectional round to DePaul College Prep (known as Gordon Tech), whose star was future DePaul teammate Tom Kleinschmidt.

As a senior, Patton led an undefeated Loyola team to the IHSA 1991 Class 6A state football semi-finals to lose to Glenbard North High School. Patton, who also served as punter, was Chicago Catholic League co-MVP. That November, Chicago Sun-Times journalist Taylor Bell described Patton as "one of the best three-sport athletes produced in Illinois since Dike Eddleman created his legend in Centralia 50 years ago". Loyola (16–10) lost in the 1992 IHSA basketball sectional semi-finals.

The only football recruiting visit that Patton made was to Indiana because recruiters were unsure which sport he would choose. By early March 1992, he chose basketball over football. In late March 1992, Patton verbally committed to DePaul for basketball over athletic scholarship offers from Northern Illinois and Evansville and an opportunity to be a preferred walk-on at Illinois. On April 15, 1992, Patton signed his National Letter of Intent with DePaul. Patton would have been likely in the playing rotation at either Evansville or Northern as a freshman. In fact, if he had met the admissions standards at Northwestern, he would have been in the rotation there as well, but he did not meet the standards. Patton had dreamt of playing for Indiana, but in the end they ranked Patton below Malcolm Sims. At DePaul, Patton was expected to perform as a backup to Howard Nathan and bolster DePaul at the point guard position where they were lacking depth alongside shooting guard/small forward Kleinschmidt. As a senior, his multi-sport star status put him in the conversation along with the likes of Dani Tyler and Chris Collins for Chicago Tribune athlete of the year recognition.

== College career ==
On September 3, 1992, DePaul announced that Nathan was "dismissed for academic reasons". Nathan had started eight games as a freshman, led the team in steals and placed second all-time among DePaul freshmen in assists and steals. Head coach Joey Meyer was evaluating Patton and Brandon Cole as his potential starting point guards. On the eve of opening night it was not clear who would start. After the first few games, Patton was described as "a semi-starter" by Sun-Times writer Toni Ginnetti.

Patton played four seasons of college basketball for the DePaul Blue Demons between 1992 and 1996. He never missed a game in college and set the DePaul single-season three-point percentage record as a junior (54.1%), a mark that still stood as of 2016.

== Playing career ==
In 1996, Patton had a two-game stint with the Carolina Cardinals of the United States Basketball League (USBL). He went on to play 30 games in the International Basketball Association (IBA) for the Dakota Wizards during the 1996–97 season, where he earned All-IBA Second Team honors. In 1997–98, he played 34 games in the IBA for the Magic City Snowbears.

For the 1998–99 season, Patton played in Croatia for Kandid Olimpija Osijek. He averaged 7.3 points and 2.5 assists before he was waived in January 1999.

== Coaching career ==
In 2016, Patton joined the Minnesota Timberwolves coaching staff as a shooting coach. Between 2018 and 2023, Patton served as shooting coach of the Dallas Mavericks. In 2023, the Chicago Bulls hired Patton as the Director of Player Development. On April 18, 2025, Patton was fired by the Bulls following their play-in loss to the Miami Heat.

On October 8, 2025, the New York Knicks hired Patton to serve as their shooting coach.

== See also ==
- DePaul Blue Demons men's basketball statistical leaders
