= JBL Super League =

- Founded: 2001
- First season: 2001–02
- Folded: 2007
- Country: Japan
- Confederation: FIBA Asia (Asia)
- Number of teams: 8
- Level on pyramid: 1
- Last champions: Toyota Alvark (3rd title)
- Most championships: Toyota Alvark (3)

The JBL Super League was a professional basketball league in Japan. It started operations in 2001 and was disbanded in 2007, with the foundation of the Japan Basketball League.

== History ==
The first season of the JBL Super League was played in 2001–02, but a "Pre-Super League" was played in 2000–01. The league was played with 8 participating teams for the first seasons until 2006, when Fukuoka Red Falcons left the league. The JBL Super League was disbanded in 2007, after the 2006–07 season, and the 7 teams went on to found the Japan Basketball League.

== List of champions ==
Season	Regular season champion	Finals champion	Series	Runner-up
2000–01 (Pre)	Toshiba Red Thunders	Isuzu Motors Giga Cats	2–1	Toyota Alvark
2001–02	Aisin Seiki Aisin SeaHorses	Toyota Alvark	2–0	Isuzu Motors Giga Cats
2002–03	Aisin Seiki Aisin SeaHorses	Aisin Seiki Aisin SeaHorses	2–0	Toyota Alvark
2003–04	Aisin Seiki Aisin SeaHorses	Aisin Seiki Aisin SeaHorses	2–1	Toshiba Brave Thunders
2004–05	Aisin SeaHorses	Toshiba Brave Thunders	3–2	Aisin SeaHorses
2005–06	Toyota Alvark	Toyota Alvark	3–1	OSG Phoenix
2006–07	Mitusbishi Electric Melco Dolphins	Toyota Alvark	3–0	Mitusbishi Electric Melco Dolphins

== Teams ==
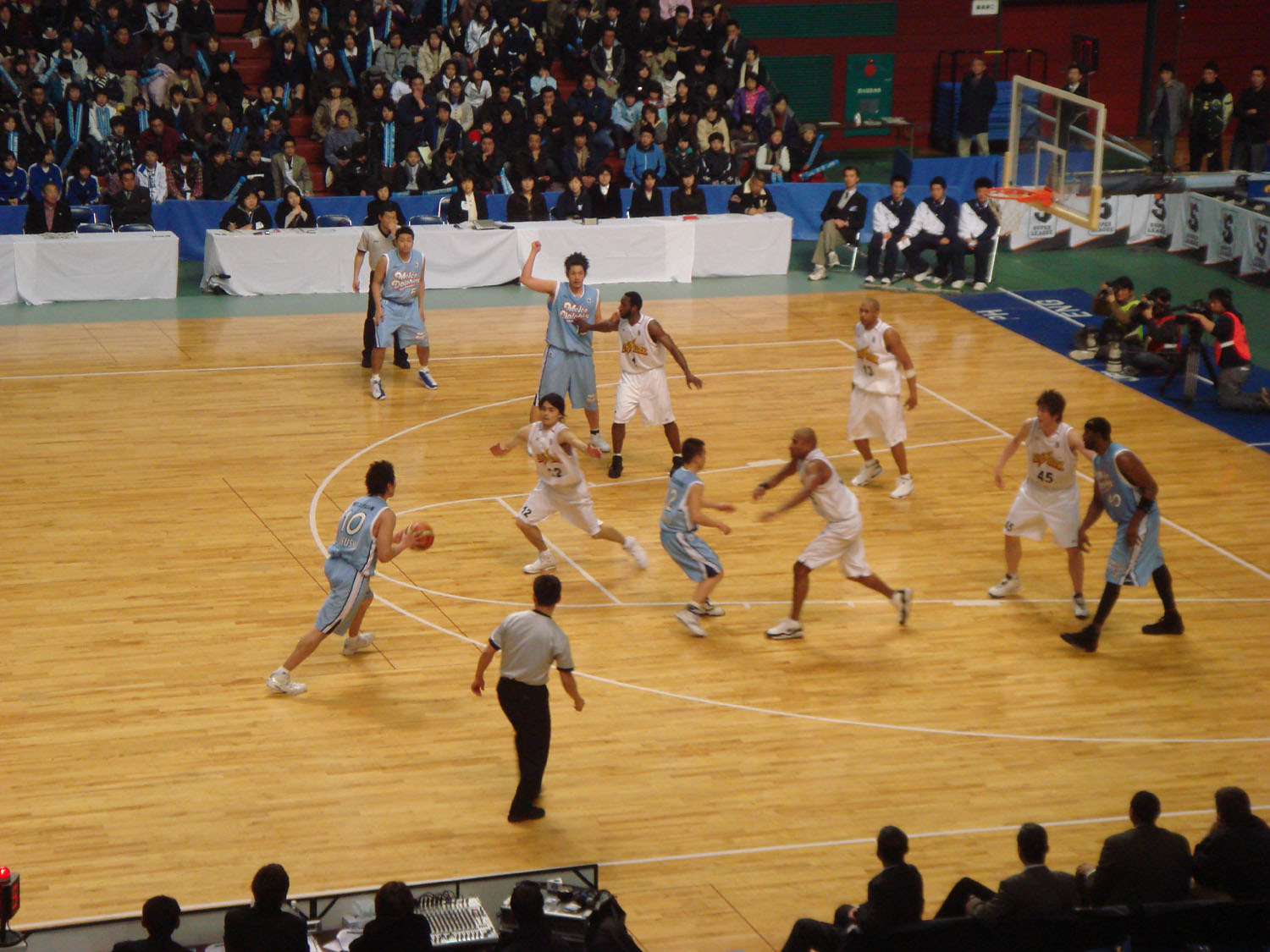
A JBL Super League match in the league's final season

The following is a list of clubs that took part in JBL Super League seasons. Teams that also participated in the 2000–01 Pre-Super League are marked with an asterisk. Teams that left the league before its final season are in italics.

- Aisin Seiki Aisin SeaHorses* (2000–07), changed name to Aisin SeaHorses in 2004
- Bosch Blue Winds* (2000–02)
- Fukuoka Red Falcons (2005–06)
- Hitachi SunRockers* (2000–07)
- Isuzu Motors Giga Cats* (2000–02)
- Matsushita Electric Panasonic Super Kangaroos* (2000–07), changed name to Panasonic Super Kangaroos in 2006
- Mitsubishi Electric Melco Dolphins* (2000–07)
- Niigata Albirex (2002–05)
- OSG Phoenix (2002–07)
- Toshiba Red Thunders* (2000–07), changed name to Toshiba Brave Thunders in 2002
- Toyota Alvark* (2000–07)

== Award winners ==
=== Most Valuable Player ===
Season	MVP	Team
2000–01 (Pre)	(Japan) Kenichi Sako	Isuzu Motors Giga Cats
2001–02	(Japan) Takehiko Orimo	Toyota Alvark
2002–03	(Japan) Masaki Goto	Aisin Seiki Aisin SeaHorses
2003–04	(Japan) Masaki Goto (2×)	Aisin Seiki Aisin SeaHorses
2004–05	(United States) Tom Kleinschmidt	Toshiba Brave Thunders
2005–06	(United States) Doron Perkins	Toyota Alvark
2006–07	(United States) Charles O'Bannon	Toyota Alvark

== Statistical leaders ==
=== Top scorers ===
Season	Player	Team	PPG
2000–01 (Pre)	(United States) Lucius Davis	Isuzu Motors Giga Cats	25.1
2001–02	(United States) David Booth	Matsushita Electric Panasonic Super Kangaroos	32.3
2002–03	(United States) David Booth (2×)	Matsushita Electric Panasonic Super Kangaroos	31.4
2003–04	(United States) Johnny Rhodes	OSG Phoenix	31.8
2004–05	(United States) Ace Custis	OSG Phoenix	28.0
2005–06	(United States) J. R. Henderson	Aisin SeaHorses	26.0
2006–07	(United States) Randy Holcomb	Toshiba Brave Thunders	26.5

=== Rebounding leaders ===
Season	Player	Team	RPG
2000–01 (Pre)	(United States) Eric McArthur	Bosch Blue Winds	13.5
2001–02	(United States) David Booth	Matsushita Electric Panasonic Super Kangaroos	13.9
2002–03	(United States) Greg Stolt	Niigata Albirex	14.8
2003–04	(United States) David Booth (2×)	Matsushita Electric Panasonic Super Kangaroos	14.0
2004–05	(United States) Nick Davis	Niigata Albirex	15.6
2005–06	(United States) Peter Cornell	Fukuoka Red Falcons	15.3
2006–07	(United States) Ace Custis	Panasonic Super Kangaroos	13.6

=== Assists leaders ===
Season	Player	Team	APG
2000–01 (Pre)	(Japan) Takahiro Setsumasa	Toshiba Red Thunders	5.5
2001–02	(United States) Tom Kleinschmidt	Bosch Blue Winds	7.3
2002–03	(United States) Tom Kleinschmidt (2×)	Toshiba Brave Thunders	5.3
2003–04	(United States) Johnny Rhodes	OSG Phoenix	6.9
2004–05	(United States) Ace Custis	OSG Phoenix	5.4
2005–06	(United States) Doron Perkins	Toyota Alvark	6.8
2006–07	(United States) Louis Campbell	Toyota Alvark	5.6

=== Steals leaders ===
Season	Player	Team	SPG
2001–02	(United States) Fred Lewis	Bosch Blue Winds	2.1
2002–03	(United States) Fred Lewis (2×)	Toshiba Brave Thunders	1.8
2003–04	(United States) Johnny Rhodes	OSG Phoenix	3.0
2004–05	(Japan) Shinsuke Kashiwagi	Hitachi SunRockers	2.1
2005–06	(United States) Doron Perkins	Toyota Alvark	2.9
2006–07	(United States) Louis Campbell	Toyota Alvark	2.1

=== Blocks leaders ===
Season	Player	Team	BPG
2001–02	(United States) Casey Calvary	Isuzu Motors Giga Cats	2.5
2002–03	(Senegal) Ndongo N'Diaye	OSG Phoenix	3.0
2003–04	(United States) Todd Lindeman	Toyota Alvark	1.8
2004–05	(United States) Nick Davis	Niigata Albirex	1.9
2005–06	(United States) Jerald Honeycutt	OSG Phoenix	1.6
2006–07	(United States) Jerald Honeycutt (2×)	Mitsubishi Electric Melco Dolphins	1.6
