= Ken Warzynski =

American basketball player (1948–2019)

Personal information
- Born: June 30, 1948 Chicago, Illinois, U.S.
- Died: January 18, 2019 (aged 70) Mount Pleasant, South Carolina, U.S.
- Listed height: 6 ft 7 in (2.01 m)
- Listed weight: 213 lb (97 kg)

Career information
- High school: Gordon Tech (Chicago, Illinois)
- College: DePaul (1967–1970)
- NBA draft: 1970: 2nd round, 32nd overall pick
- Drafted by: Detroit Pistons
- Position: Power forward
- Number: 40
- Stats at Basketball Reference

Kenneth Harry Warzynski (June 30, 1948 – January 18, 2019) was an American basketball player who played for DePaul University and was a second round draft pick (32nd pick overall) of the Detroit Pistons in the 1970 NBA draft.

== Early life ==
Warzynski was born in Chicago, Illinois, on June 30, 1948, the son of Harry and Florence Warzynski. He was raised with his sister Arlene and attended Gordon Technical High School in Chicago. Warzynski graduated from Gordon Technical in 1966, where he played basketball and also varsity baseball.

== College career ==
A 6'7" forward, Warzynski played college basketball for DePaul University under Hall of Fame Coach Ray Meyer. As a Senior in 1969–1970, Warzynski averaged 19.7 points and 15.2 rebounds, as DePaul finished 12–13.

Warzynski had 28 rebounds against Harvard on Jan. 3, 1970, still the DePaul single-game team record. Warzynski ranks fourth on DePaul's all-time rebounding list and his career rebounding average of 11.6 is currently third all time. His 15.2 rebounding average in 1969–1970 is second all-time at DePaul.

Overall, Warzynski averaged 16.0 points and 11.6 rebounds in his 75 career games at DePaul, with 1,203 total points and 890 total rebounds.

== Professional career ==
The Detroit Pistons selected Warzynski in the second round of the 1970 NBA draft. The Pistons had drafted Bob Lanier with the #1 pick in the 1970 Draft. Warzynski never played in the NBA. The Denver Rockets of the American Basketball Association also selected Warzynski in the 11th round of the 1970 ABA Draft.

In 1970–1971, Warzynski played for the Rockford Royals of the Continental Basketball Association, along with former DePaul teammate Al Zetsche.

== Honors ==
- Warzynski was inducted into the DePaul Athletics Hall of Fame in 1987. His coach, Ray Meyer, was a fellow inductee in the ceremony on November 20, 1987.

== Personal ==
Warzynski had a career in real estate in South Carolina.

Warzynski died on January 18, 2019. He was survived by his four children, Julie, JoAnne, Chris and Kevin.
