= Peter Patton =

Peter Patton may refer to:

- Peter Patton (ice hockey) (1876–1939), English ice hockey player and administrator
- Peter Patton (basketball) (born 1973), American former basketball player, coach, and administrator
