= Lemone Lampley =

American basketball player

Personal information
- Born: May 9, 1964 (age 62) Chicago, Illinois, U.S.
- Listed height: 6 ft 11 in (2.11 m)
- Listed weight: 205 lb (93 kg)

Career information
- High school: Vocational (Chicago, Illinois)
- College: DePaul (1982–1986)
- NBA draft: 1986: 2nd round, 38th overall pick
- Drafted by: Seattle SuperSonics
- Playing career: 1986–1994
- Position: Center
- Number: 32

Career history
- 1986–1987: Sebastiani Rieti
- 1987–1988: CAI Zaragoza
- 1988–1989: Tenerife Nº1
- 1989–1990: Joventut Badalona
- 1990–1993: Ticino Siena
- 1993–1994: Stefanel Trieste
- 1994–1995: PAOK Thessaloniki
- Stats at Basketball Reference

Lemone Lampley (born May 9, 1964) is an American former basketball player and until 2016 was assistant director of Athletic Development at his alma mater, DePaul University. He left DePaul after completing his master's degree there to found a non profit charitable organization dedicated to helping youth in Chicago to realize their potential called M.O.C.C.H.A, (Men of Color Connected for Higher Achievement). He played professionally for eight years in Italy, Greece and Spain.

Lampley, a 6'11" center from Chicago, played college basketball for Hall of Fame coach Ray Meyer, then his son Joey Meyer at DePaul. Despite never being a regular starter for the Blue Demons, Lampley was drafted by the Seattle SuperSonics in the second round of the 1986 NBA draft (38th pick overall). Though he never played in the NBA, Lampley did play in the top leagues in Spain, Italy and Greece. While in Europe, Lampley twice played in teams that reached the final of the FIBA Korać Cup, winning the trophy in 1990 with Joventut Badalona and losing the final in 1994 with Stefanel Trieste, ironically against PAOK, the team he then joined.
