= Ron Feiereisel =

American basketball player and coach

Personal information
- Born: August 6, 1931
- Died: January 28, 2000 (aged 68)
- Listed height: 6 ft 3 in (1.91 m)
- Listed weight: 185 lb (84 kg)

Career information
- High school: DePaul Academy (Chicago, Illinois)
- College: DePaul (1950–1953)
- NBA draft: 1953: 2nd round, 15th overall pick
- Drafted by: Minneapolis Lakers
- Position: Guard
- Number: 22

Career history

Playing
- 1955: Minneapolis Lakers

Coaching
- 19??–1980: DePaul (men's assistant)
- 1980–1984: DePaul (women's)

Career highlights
- Third-team All-American – UPI (1953)
- Stats at NBA.com
- Stats at Basketball Reference

Ronald E. Feiereisel (August 6, 1931 – January 28, 2000) was an American basketball player and coach.

== Playing career ==
A 6'3" guard, Feiereisel starred at DePaul Academy in Chicago before playing for Ray Meyer at DePaul University from 1950 to 1953. As a senior, he was an honorable mention All-American after averaging 18 points per game.

Following a two-year stint with the Army, Feiereisel signed with the Minneapolis Lakers of the NBA in August 1955. After a good showing during the preseason, he was released by the Lakers in end of November the same year after appearing in 10 of Lakers' first 11 regular season games where he averaged 3.0 points per game.

== Coaching career ==
Feiereisel began his coaching career with DePaul Academy, first as an assistant and later as head coach, and led the school to the 1959 Chicago Catholic League title. After a stint as an assistant to Ray Meyer, Feiereisel moved on to St. Viator High School, where he became the school's first boys' basketball coach. He then became a referee for the American Basketball Association and Big Ten Conference.

In 1980, he returned to DePaul to become their women's basketball coach. Over four seasons, he posted a 61–57 record.

== Death ==
Feiereisel died on January 28, 2000, aged 68, at Northwestern Memorial Hospital in Chicago.

== Career statistics ==
Legend
GP	Games played	GS	Games started	MPG	Minutes per game
FG%	Field goal percentage	3P%	3-point field goal percentage	FT%	Free throw percentage
RPG	Rebounds per game	APG	Assists per game	SPG	Steals per game
BPG	Blocks per game	PPG	Points per game	**Bold**	Career high

=== NBA ===
==== Regular season ====
Year	Team	GP	MPG	FG%	FT%	RPG	APG	PPG
1955–56	Minneapolis	10	5.9	.286	.875	.6	.6	3.0
