= Great Midwest Conference Men's Basketball Player of the Year =

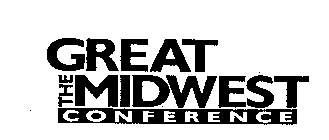
- Awarded for: the most outstanding basketball player in the Great Midwest Conference
- Country: United States

History
- First award: 1992
- Final award: 1995

The Great Midwest Conference Men's Basketball Player of the Year was an award given to the Great Midwest Conference's most outstanding player. The award was short-lived and only handed out from 1992 to 1995. Four recipients received the award, but only Anfernee "Penny" Hardaway won more than once. Hardaway was the award's first and second player of the year recipient honoree.

The Great Midwest Conference was an NCAA Division I conference that existed from 1991–92 to 1994–95. It was formed in 1990 with six members: Cincinnati and Memphis State (now Memphis) from the Metro Conference; UAB from the Sun Belt Conference; Marquette and Saint Louis from the Midwestern Collegiate Conference (now the Horizon League), and independent DePaul. Dayton joined in 1993.

In 1995, reunification with the Metro Conference and teams from the Southwest Conference formed Conference USA.

== Winners ==
Player (X)	Denotes the number of times the player has been awarded the Great Midwest Player of the Year award

Season	Player	School	Position	Class	Reference
1991–92	Penny Hardaway	Memphis	G / SF	Sophomore	
1992–93	Penny Hardaway (2)	Memphis	G / SF	Junior	
1993–94	Jim McIlvaine	Marquette	C	Senior	
1994–95	Tom Kleinschmidt	DePaul	SG / SF	Senior	

== Winners by school ==
School (year joined)	Winners	Years
Memphis (1991)	2	1992, 1993
Marquette (1991)	1	1994
DePaul (1991)	1	1995
Cincinnati (1991)	0	—
Saint Louis (1991)	0	—
UAB (1991)	0	—
