= David Booth (basketball) =

American basketball player (born 1970)

Personal information
- Born: May 28, 1970 (age 56) Peoria, Illinois, U.S.
- Listed height: 6 ft 7 in (2.01 m)
- Listed weight: 209 lb (95 kg)

Career information
- High school: Manual (Peoria, Illinois)
- College: DePaul (1988–1992)
- NBA draft: 1992: undrafted
- Playing career: 1992–2005
- Position: Power forward / center
- Number: 30

Career history
- 1992–1993: Évreux
- 1993–1994: Tri-City Chinook
- 1994: Yakima Sun Kings
- 1994: Trotamundos de Carabobo
- 1994–1995: Pallacanestro Pavia
- 1995–1996: Toulouse Spacer's
- 1996–1997: JDA Dijon
- 1997–1998: La Crosse Bobcats
- 1998: Pop Cola 800s
- 1998–1999: Müller Verona
- 1999–2000: Idaho Stampede
- 2000: Aris
- 2001–2005: Panasonic Super Kangaroos

Career highlights
- 2× JBL Super League rebounding leader (2002, 2004); 2× JBL Super League top scorer (2002, 2003); LNB Pro A Best Scorer (1997); LNB Pro B MVP (1996); Liga Profesional de Baloncesto champion (1994); All-CBA First Team (1998); First-team All-Great Midwest (1992)

David Booth (born May 28, 1970) is an American basketball executive and former professional player. A native of Peoria, Illinois, Booth played for Manual High School, where he reached the Class AA Tournaments in three consecutive seasons; he would later be inducted in the Greater Peoria Sports Hall of Fame. He then played 4 years of college basketball with DePaul, and graduated as the second best scorer in program history with 1,933 total points. After going undrafted in the 1992 NBA draft, Booth started his career in France and over a 13-year span he also played in Greece, Italy, Japan, the Philippines and Venezuela. In 2009, Booth was inducted in DePaul's Hall of Fame.

== High school career ==
Booth was born in Peoria, Illinois and he attended Manual High School there. Listed at 6 ft 6 in (1.98 m) and 160 pounds (73 kg), he mainly played as a center, though he was sometimes used at the forward position. Booth gave significant contribution to the team since his sophomore season in 1986, reaching the Class AA tournament; in his junior season in 1987 he averaged 17.2 points and 7.2 rebounds per game, while his team had a 26–0 record before losing in overtime to Quincy, 59–61 during the Class AA tournament; that year, Booth was an Honorable Mention All-State selection. In his senior season, Booth helped his team reach the Class AA tournament for the third consecutive year, losing in the semifinal game to Lincoln High School, which was led by future NBA players LaPhonso Ellis and Cuonzo Martin: Booth had 20 points and 12 rebounds in that game.

== College career ==
Booth had attracted the interest of several NCAA Division I programs, including Bradley, DePaul, Iowa, Marquette, Michigan and Purdue: he verbally committed to DePaul in November 1987, and later signed officially to play for them. In his first season with DePaul, Booth started 10 out of 33 games, and averaged 9.9 points, 4.4 rebounds, 1.5 assist and 1.1 steals in 21.8 minutes per game.

Booth received increased playing time in his sophomore season in 1989–90, playing 1,140 total minutes (32.6 per game) and he improved his averages to 16.9 points, 6.1 rebounds, 1.9 assists, 1.4 steals and 1.3 blocks per game. On January 27, 1990, Booth scored a season-high and then career-high 37 points in a 66 62 win against Louisville. This performance earned him the National Player of the Week award by Sports Illustrated.

Booth started the 1990–91 season as one of the main players in DePaul's rotation and he played 29 games, averaging a career-best 18.7 points along with 6.8 rebounds, 1.7 assists, 1.4 steals and 1 block per game; On December 15, 1990, he scored his career high with DePaul with 40 points against UCLA. In his senior season he was named team captain; on December 21, 1991, he scored 30 points against Baylor. He was the top scorer of DePaul's first conference home game on January 11, 1992, against Memphis (25 points) and he scored a season-high 35 points against Loyola Marymount on January 15. Booth was a Great Midwest Conference First team selection after averaging 17.4 points, 5.3 rebounds, 1.3 assists and 1.5 steals per game over 27 appearances (all starts), playing an average of 29.6 minutes per game; he also improved his shooting, and shot career-highs in field goal percentage (51.1%), three-point field goal percentage (41.2%) and free throw percentage (77.3%).

He graduated as the first player in DePaul's history to record 1,500 points, 500 rebounds, 200 assists and 100 blocks.

== Professional career ==
After graduating from DePaul, Booth was automatically eligible for the 1992 NBA draft: in a June 24, 1992 article The Philadelphia Inquirer indicated him as one of the best small forwards available in the draft. He had participated in pre-draft workouts with some NBA teams, including the New Jersey Nets, and took part in the Orlando All-Star Classic, a game for college seniors attended by NBA scouts, where he scored 16 points and had 6 rebounds. Despite interest from NBA teams, Booth went undrafted. He was drafted in the 3rd round (41st overall) of the Continental Basketball Association (CBA) draft by the Rapid City Thrillers. Booth decided not to sign with the Thrillers and moved instead to France, starting his professional career with Évreux in the LNB Pro B, the second tier of French basketball. In his rookie season, he averaged 26.7 points, 6.9 rebounds and 2.9 assists per game while also shooting 43.3% from three over 22 games (38.6 minutes per game).

After playing in France, Booth moved back to the United States; in December 1993 the Rapid City Thrillers traded him to the Tri-City Chinook in exchange for the rights to Anthony Cook and a 1994 draft pick; Booth played 23 games with the Chinook, averaging 8.7 points, 2.8 rebounds and 0.7 assists per game; he then finished the season with another CBA team, the Yakima Sun Kings, for which he played 10 games averaging 8.4 points, 2.7 rebounds and 0.7 assists per game. In 1994 Booth was part of the Trotamundos de Carabobo squad that won the 1994 Liga Profesional de Baloncesto championship in Venezuela. Booth later moved to Italy where he played for Pallacanestro Pavia in the Serie A2, the second tier of basketball in Italy: during the season he scored 56 points in a game against Turboair Fabriano, establishing one of the best single-game scoring performances of all time in Italy. In 15 league games Booth averaged 38.8 points, 11.1 rebounds, 0.9 assists and 3.7 steals in 36.4 minutes per game.

In 1995 Booth went back to France and joined the Toulouse Spacer's, another Pro B team, and averaged 31.3 points, 8.7 rebounds, 3 assists and 1.4 steals in 38 minutes per game, receiving the LNB Pro B MVP award for the 1995–96 season as the best foreign player in the league. Booth then played for the Los Angeles Lakers during the Summer Pro League in Southern California and he signed a contract with the team in September; he was waived on October 21, 1996, a few days before the start of the 1996–97 NBA season. Booth then signed for JDA Dijon, moving up to the Pro A, the top league in France. In 18 games with the new team, Booth averaged 22.6 points, 6 rebounds, 2.2 assists and 0.9 steals per game, and was the league's top scorer.

In 1997 Booth spent the preseason with the Vancouver Grizzlies of the NBA before being released in late October; later on the La Crosse Bobcats, a CBA team, signed Booth: he appeared in 46 games in the 1997–98 CBA season, starting 42 and averaging 18.5 points, 5.8 rebounds, 1.4 assists, 1 steal and 1.4 blocks per game (35.4 minutes of average playing time). The Bobcats qualified for the playoffs and Booth appeared in 3 games, averaging 16.7 points, 6.3 rebounds and 3.7 assists in a career-high 45.7 minutes per game. He was selected to the All-CBA First Team in 1998. Booth then moved to the Philippines and played for the Pop Cola 800s during the 1998 PBA Governors' Cup. He went back to Italy for the 1998–99 Lega Basket Serie A season, signing for Müller Verona. In 20 games he averaged 21.3 points, 6.3 rebounds and 0.9 assists per game, shooting a career-high 45.2% from three.

Booth returned to the United States for the 1999–2000 season, signing for the Idaho Stampede of the CBA: he played 12 games with the team (10 starts) and averaged 12.9 points, 5.4 rebounds and 1.5 assists per game. He then played for Aris in Greece, and later on he moved to Japan, signing with the Matsushita Electric Panasonic Super Kangaroos. He was the top scorer of the 2000–01 JBL Super League season, averaging 32.3 points per game, and also led the league in rebounding at 13.9 a game. He repeated as the league's top scorer in the 2002–03 season, with an average of 31.4 points per game; he was then the top rebounder in the league in the 2003–04 season at 14 per game. He stopped playing after the 2004–05 season spent with the Super Kangaroos.

== Post-playing career ==
After his retirement from professional basketball, Booth served as a scout for the Memphis Grizzlies and the New Orleans Pelicans; from 2014 to 2019 he was Director of Player Personnel for the Pelicans. On June 22, 2020, Booth was appointed NBA Vice President of Basketball Operations.
