= Jim Platt (basketball) =

American basketball player and coach

Biographical details
- Born: March 1, 1952 (age 74); Aurora, Illinois, U.S.

Playing career
- 1969–1973: Concordia (IL)

Coaching career (HC unless noted)
- 1973–1978: Luther North HS
- 1978–1984: Illinois State (assistant)
- 1984–1990: DePaul (assistant)
- 1990–1994: Arkansas–Little Rock
- 1994–1997: Tulsa (assistant)
- 1997–2000: Florida State (assistant)
- 2000–2005: Charleston Southern
- 2005–2010: Army (assistant)
- 2010–2011: Bradley (assistant)
- 2012–2016: Saint Louis (assistant)

Head coaching record
- Overall: 111–148 (college)

Accomplishments and honors

Awards
- Big South Coach of the Year (2001)

Jim Platt (born March 1, 1952) is an American college basketball coach. He has previously served as head coach at the University of Arkansas at Little Rock and Charleston Southern University. While at Charleston Southern, Platt earned Big South Conference Coach of the Year honors in his first season at the helm. The Buccaneers were 55–89 under his leadership.

Platt reunited with Jim Crews at Saint Louis University as an assistant coach between 2012 and 2016, after spending one season at Bradley as assistant coach. He had spent the previous five seasons at Army with Jim Crews.

Prior to his stint in Charleston, Platt worked as an assistant coach at Florida State University for three years, which itself was preceded by another three-year assistant's job at the University of Tulsa.

Platt arrived at Tulsa after being relieved of his duties at his first head coaching job at the University of Arkansas at Little Rock. Platt worked for four years at the helm of the Trojan program, accruing a record of 56–59 between 1990 and 1994.

Platt started his collegiate coaching career in 1978 at Illinois State University, where he stayed for six years. He left Illinois State to join Joey Meyer's coaching staff at DePaul University in 1984, where he spent another six years as an assistant.

Born in Aurora, Illinois, he is an alumnus of Concordia University Chicago, where he played both basketball and baseball as an undergrad. In 2003, Platt was inducted into the Concordia Athletic Hall of Fame.

After graduating from Concordia in 1973, Platt got his start in coaching at Illinois' Luther High School North, where he stayed for five years before transitioning to the collegiate level.
