= Bosch Blue Winds =

- Leagues: JBL
- Founded: 1950
- Folded: 2002
- History: Diesel Kiki Higashimatsuyama; Zexel Blue Winds; Bosch Blue Winds
- Location: Higashimatsuyama, Saitama
- Ownership: Zexel

The Bosch Blue Winds were a Japanese basketball team that played in the Japan Basketball League. They were based in Higashimatsuyama, Saitama.

== Notable players ==
- Yoshihiko Amano
- Deron Feldhaus
- Makoto Hasegawa
- Tom Kleinschmidt
- Marcus Liberty
- Takeo Mabashi
- Eric McArthur
- John Murray (basketball)
- Seiichi Oba
- Kenji Okamura
- Gerald Paddio
- Andre Riddick
- Dan Weiss (basketball)
- Galen Young
