= Tom Kleinschmidt =

American basketball player and coach

Personal information
- Born: February 21, 1973 (age 53)
- Listed height: 6 ft 5 in (1.96 m)
- Listed weight: 220 lb (100 kg)

Career information
- High school: Gordon Tech (Chicago, Illinois)
- College: DePaul (1991–1995)
- NBA draft: 1995: undrafted
- Playing career: 1995–2006
- Position: Small forward / shooting guard

Career history
- 1995–1996: Chicago Rockers
- 1996–2000: Mitsubishi Dolphins
- 2000: Andrea Costa Imola
- 2000–2002: Bosch Blue Winds
- 2002–2006: Toshiba Brave Thunders

Career highlights
- JBL Super League champion (2005); 2× JBL Super League All-Star (2005, 2006); CBA All-Rookie Second Team (1996); Great Midwest Player of the Year (1995); 3× First-team All-Great Midwest (1993–1995); First-team Parade All-American (1991); McDonald's All-American (1991)

Thomas Kleinschmidt (born February 21, 1973) is a retired American basketball player and current head basketball coach at DePaul College Prep High School in Chicago, Illinois. He was an All-American at DePaul University and the first player in school history to win a conference player of the year award.

== High school ==
Kleinschmidt led Chicago's Gordon Tech to a runner-up finish in the 1990 Illinois High School Association's boys basketball tournament. While losing to Chicago King, 65 - 55, Kleinschmidt, as a junior, scored 27 of the 55 points. During the entire tournament that included four games, he totaled 125 points (31.25 ppg), 38 rebounds (9.5 rpg), 15 assists (3.75 apg), 14 steals (3.5 spg) and 7 blocked shots (1.75 bpg). In 2006, Kleinschmidt was voted as one of the 100 Legends of the IHSA Boys Basketball Tournament, a group of former players and coaches in honor of the 100 anniversary of the IHSA boys basketball tournament.

== College career ==
A hotly recruited small forward from Gordon Tech in Chicago, Kleinschmidt settled on hometown DePaul University. There, he became one of the Blue Demons' greatest players. He was a three-time first team All-Great Midwest Conference pick and was the conference player of the year and an AP honorable mention All-American as a senior in 1995. This made him the first conference player of the year winner in DePaul history. In his DePaul career, Kleinschmidt scored 1,837 points (16.3 per game). He was the first Blue Demon to amass over 1,000 points, 500 rebounds, 300 assists, 100 steals and 100 three pointers.

== Professional career ==
After graduation, Kleinschmidt was not drafted in the 1995 NBA draft. He went to training camp with the Seattle SuperSonics but was among the final cuts. He then played for the Chicago Rockers of the Continental Basketball Association during the 1995–96 season, where he averaged 13.3 points per game and made the CBA All-Rookie second team.

From there, Kleinschmidt played in Japan, Italy and Venezuela, with his best years coming in the Japanese Super League for Bosch, Mitsubishi and Toshiba. He led the Super League in scoring twice during his time there.

== Coaching career ==
After the conclusion of his professional career, Kleinschmidt sought to enter coaching. He became Director of Basketball Operations in 2009 at his alma mater under head coach Jerry Wainwright, but was released when Wainwright was fired at the end of the 2009–10 season. He became a volunteer assistant at York High School in 2010, then became head coach in June 2011. In April 2012, Kleinschmidt left York to return to his alma mater to become the head basketball coach at Gordon Tech High School which changed its name in July 2014 to DePaul College Prep. Kleinschmidt's DePaul Prep won three consecutive Illinois state championships in different divisions from 2023 to 2025.
