= Steven Hunter =

American basketball player (born 1981)

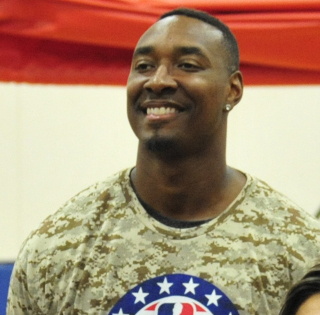
- Hunter at Luke Air Force Base in 2016

Personal information
- Born: October 31, 1981 (age 45) Chicago, Illinois, U.S.
- Listed height: 7 ft 0 in (2.13 m)
- Listed weight: 240 lb (109 kg)

Career information
- High school: Proviso East (Maywood, Illinois)
- College: DePaul (1999–2001)
- NBA draft: 2001: 1st round, 15th overall pick
- Drafted by: Orlando Magic
- Playing career: 2001–2011
- Position: Center / power forward
- Number: 34, 45

Career history
- 2001–2004: Orlando Magic
- 2004–2005: Phoenix Suns
- 2005–2007: Philadelphia 76ers
- 2007–2008: Denver Nuggets
- 2009–2010: Memphis Grizzlies
- 2011: Dinamo Sassari
- Stats at NBA.com
- Stats at Basketball Reference

Steven Deon Hunter (born October 31, 1981) is an American former professional basketball player. He is listed as a center. He most recently played for Dinamo Sassari.

== High school and college career ==
Hunter played basketball at Proviso East High School, which has produced other NBA players such as Sherell Ford, Michael Finley, Jim Brewer, Doc Rivers, Dee Brown, Donnie Boyce, Reggie Jordan, Shannon Brown, Sterling Brown, and Jevon Carter. Hunter then played two years at DePaul University in Chicago, before declaring himself eligible for the 2001 NBA draft.

== Professional career ==
As a rookie, Hunter set a then-career high points total with 17 points on December 5, 2001, in a 102–74 win over the Chicago Bulls.

In 2002 during training camp with the Magic he suffered an anterior cruciate ligament injury and missed 49 games of the 2002–2003 NBA season.

On April 24, 2005, then on the Phoenix Suns, Hunter scored a postseason career high 16 points, alongside grabbing 5 rebounds, in a 114–103 victory over the Memphis Grizzlies. Hunter and the Suns would ultimately make it to the Western Conference Finals before losing to the Spurs.

In the 2005 offseason, he signed with the 76ers as a free agent. They traded him to the New Orleans Hornets on February 1, 2006, in exchange for two second-round draft picks in 2006 and 2007. On February 10, Philadelphia president Billy King announced that the Hornets rescinded the deal.

On September 10, 2007, Hunter was traded with Bobby Jones by the 76ers to the Denver Nuggets for Reggie Evans and the draft rights to Ricky Sanchez.

On August 7, 2009, the Nuggets traded Hunter and a lottery-protected 2010 first-round draft pick to the Memphis Grizzlies for a future second-round pick.

Hunter's final NBA game was played on February 6, 2010, in a 102–109 loss to the Minnesota Timberwolves where he recorded 2 points and 1 rebound in 5 minutes of play.

In October 2011 he signed with Dinamo Sassari in Italy.

In 2013, Hunter became a community liaison for the NBA and the Phoenix Suns throughout the community in Arizona.

== NBA career statistics ==
Legend
GP	Games played	GS	Games started	MPG	Minutes per game
FG%	Field goal percentage	3P%	3-point field goal percentage	FT%	Free throw percentage
RPG	Rebounds per game	APG	Assists per game	SPG	Steals per game
BPG	Blocks per game	PPG	Points per game	**Bold**	Career high

=== Regular season ===
Year	Team	GP	GS	MPG	FG%	3P%	FT%	RPG	APG	SPG	BPG	PPG
2001–02	Orlando	53	21	9.7	.456	.000	**.585**	1.8	.1	.1	.8	3.6
2002–03	Orlando	33	5	13.5	.544	.000	.409	2.8	.2	**.3**	1.1	3.9
2003–04	Orlando	59	23	13.4	.529	.000	.333	2.9	.2	.1	1.2	3.2
2004–05	Phoenix	**76**	3	13.8	**.614**	.000	.479	3.0	.2	.1	**1.3**	4.6
2005–06	Philadelphia	69	35	19.0	.601	.000	.514	3.9	.2	.2	1.1	6.1
2006–07	Philadelphia	70	**41**	**22.9**	.577	.000	.490	**4.8**	**.4**	.2	1.1	**6.4**
2007–08	Denver	19	2	6.3	.536	.000	.450	1.5	.0	.0	.3	2.1
2009–10	Memphis	21	0	7.5	.395	.000	.528	2.0	.0	.0	.5	2.5
Career		400	130	15.0	.560	.000	.485	3.2	.2	.1	1.1	4.5

=== Playoffs ===
Year	Team	GP	GS	MPG	FG%	3P%	FT%	RPG	APG	SPG	BPG	PPG
2003	Orlando	7	0	5.7	.300	.000	.000	.4	.1	.0	.4	.9
2005	Phoenix	**15**	0	**14.2**	**.558**	.000	**.600**	**2.5**	**.2**	**.1**	**1.2**	**4.0**
2008	Denver	2	0	2.5	.000	.000	.000	1.0	.0	.0	.0	.0
Career		24	0	10.8	.500	.000	.522	1.8	.2	.0	.9	2.8
