= Clyde Bradshaw =

American basketball player (born 1959)

Personal information
- Born: December 28, 1959 (age 66) East Orange, New Jersey, U.S.
- Listed height: 6 ft 0 in (1.83 m)
- Listed weight: 170 lb (77 kg)

Career information
- High school: East Orange (East Orange, New Jersey)
- College: DePaul (1977–1981)
- NBA draft: 1981: 2nd round, 38th overall pick
- Drafted by: Atlanta Hawks
- Playing career: 1981–1987
- Position: Point guard

Career history
- 1981–1982: Lattesole Bologna
- 1984–1985: Lancaster Lightning
- 1984–1985: Cincinnati Slammers
- 1985: Connecticut Colonials
- 1985–1986: Evansville Thunder
- 1987: Jersey Jammers

Career highlights
- Third-team All-American – UPI (1981)
- Stats at Basketball Reference

Clyde Bradshaw Jr. (born December 28, 1959) is an American former basketball player. He is known both for his All-American college years at DePaul University and was a second round draft pick in the 1981 NBA draft.

Bradshaw was recruited to DePaul from East Orange High School in East Orange, New Jersey. He played at DePaul from 1977 to 1981 and was team captain as a junior and senior. Alongside star Mark Aguirre, Bradshaw was a part of the Blue Demons' 1979 Final Four team. For his DePaul career, Bradshaw scored 1,102 points and left the program as its all-time assist leader.

After leaving DePaul, Bradshaw was drafted in the second round of the 1981 NBA Draft (38th pick overall) by the Atlanta Hawks. He played a season in Italy for Lattesole Bologna, where he averaged 16.8 points per game. He also played for two seasons in the Continental Basketball Association for the Lancaster Lightning, Cincinnati Slammers and Evansville Thunder. He averaged 6.5 points and 2.5 assists in 76 games.
