= Errol Palmer =

American basketball player

Personal information
- Born: 1945 (age 80–81)
- Listed height: 6 ft 5 in (1.96 m)
- Listed weight: 195 lb (88 kg)

Career information
- High school: Harlan (Chicago, Illinois)
- College: DePaul (1964–1967)
- NBA draft: 1967: undrafted
- Position: Small forward
- Number: 32

Career history
- 1967–1968: Minnesota Muskies
- Stats at Basketball Reference

Errol Palmer (born 1945) is an American former professional basketball small forward who played one season in the American Basketball Association (ABA) as a member of the Minnesota Muskies (1967–68). He attended DePaul University.

== Career statistics ==
Legend
GP	Games played	GS	Games started	MPG	Minutes per game
FG%	Field goal percentage	3P%	3-point field goal percentage	FT%	Free throw percentage
RPG	Rebounds per game	APG	Assists per game	SPG	Steals per game
BPG	Blocks per game	PPG	Points per game	**Bold**	Career high

=== ABA ===
==== Regular season ====
Year	Team	GP	MPG	FG%	3P%	FT%	RPG	APG	PPG
1967–68	Minnesota	63	18.9	.364	–	.672	7.5	1.4	7.9

==== Playoffs ====
Year	Team	GP	MPG	FG%	3P%	FT%	RPG	APG	PPG
1968	Minnesota	6	12.5	.400	–	.800	4.5	1.2	4.7
