= Joey Meyer (basketball) =

American basketball coach (1949–2023)

Personal information
- Born: April 2, 1949 Chicago, Illinois, U.S.
- Died: December 29, 2023 (aged 74) Hinsdale, Illinois, U.S.

Career information
- College: DePaul (1968–1971)
- NBA draft: 1971: 18th round, 233rd overall pick
- Drafted by: Buffalo Braves
- Position: Guard

Career history

Coaching
- 1974–1984: DePaul (assistant)
- 1984–1997: DePaul
- 2000–2001: Chicago Skyliners
- 2001–2005: Asheville Altitude
- 2006–2008: Tulsa 66ers
- 2009–2012: Fort Wayne Mad Ants

Career highlights
- As coach: 2× NBADL champion (2004, 2005); Great Midwest regular season champion (1992); CBS/Chevrolet Coach of the Year (1987)
- Stats at Basketball Reference

Joseph E. Meyer (April 2, 1949 – December 29, 2023) was an American college and professional men's basketball coach. He was the head coach of the DePaul Blue Demons from 1984 to 1997 and the Asheville Altitude in the NBA Development League (NBADL) from 2001 to 2005 before they moved to become the Tulsa 66ers, where he coached from 2006 to 2008. With Asheville, he became the only coach to win back-to-back league championships. He then coached Fort Wayne Mad Ants in the NBADL. He is currently the circuit's all-time leader in victories (226) and losses (237). He provided color commentary on radio broadcasts of Northwestern University men's basketball games on WGN-AM in Chicago.

== DePaul Blue Demons ==
As a player, Meyer was captain of the 1970–71 DePaul Blue Demons. He was drafted in the 18th round of the 1971 NBA draft by the Buffalo Braves. Meyer was an assistant coach at DePaul for 11 seasons under his father, Ray Meyer. Ray Meyer coached DePaul from 1942 to 1984, winning 724 games and leading the Blue Demons to winning records in 37 of his 42 seasons, including seven NCAA men's basketball tournament appearances in his last nine seasons. When Ray Meyer retired in 1984, Joey Meyer was promoted to head coach.

Joey Meyer led DePaul to seven NCAA Tournament appearances in his first eight seasons, including back-to-back Sweet Sixteen appearances in his second and third seasons. In the 1986 tournament, #12-seeded DePaul—led by freshman guard Rod Strickland (14.1 ppg season average) and junior Dallas Comegys (13.8 ppg) – upset #5-seeded Virginia and #4-seeded Oklahoma in the East regional before losing to top-seeded Duke 74–67. In 1987, the Blue Demons—again led by Comegys (17.5 ppg) and Strickland (16.3 ppg) – finished the regular season 26–2 and received a #3 seed in the Midwest regional of the 1987 tournament. They defeated #14-seeded Louisiana Tech and #6-seeded St. John's before losing to #10-seeded LSU. Meyer was honored as the Chevrolet Coach of the Year in 1987. Besides seven NCAA tournament appearances, Meyer led the Blue Demons to three appearances in the National Invitation Tournament.

In both 1988 and 1989, DePaul reached the second round of the NCAA tournament, but they were on a downward trajectory. In 1992, the Blue Demons were co-champions of the newly formed Great Midwest Conference but made their last NCAA tournament appearance under Meyer. An 11–18 finish in 1996 which was the first losing season since 1971 was followed by a 13-game losing streak to end a program-worst 3–23 in 1997. Meyer was fired on April 28, 1997, and replaced by Pat Kennedy 1 1/2 months later on June 12.

== American Basketball Association ==
Meyer began his professional basketball head coaching career with the Chicago Skyliners of the American Basketball Association, leading them to a 29–11 record and the Western Conference championship in 2000–01. After defeating the Indiana Legends 119–105 on April 12, 2001, and the Kansas City Knights 106–105 on April 13, the Skyliners lost the championship game to the Detroit Dogs 107–91 on April 14.

== NBA Development League ==
In 2001, he joined the NBA D-League with the Asheville Altitude, winning back-to-back league championships in 2004 and 2005; he is the only coach to win consecutive NBA D-League titles. After the franchise moved to Tulsa, Oklahoma to become the Tulsa 66ers, following its second title, Meyer continued to coach the team until the end of the 2007–08 campaign.

Meyer was named the head coach of the Fort Wayne Mad Ants on June 3, 2009. During his first two seasons with the Mad Ants, the ballclub went 22–28 in 2009–10 and 24–26 in 2010–11. The team's 5–10 start to the 2011–12 campaign led to his dismissal on January 6, 2012. Meyer later worked as a basketball broadcaster for WGN-AM and as a scout for the Los Angeles Clippers.

Meyer's son, Brian, was an NBA scout with the Chicago Bulls.

== Personal life ==
=== Death ===
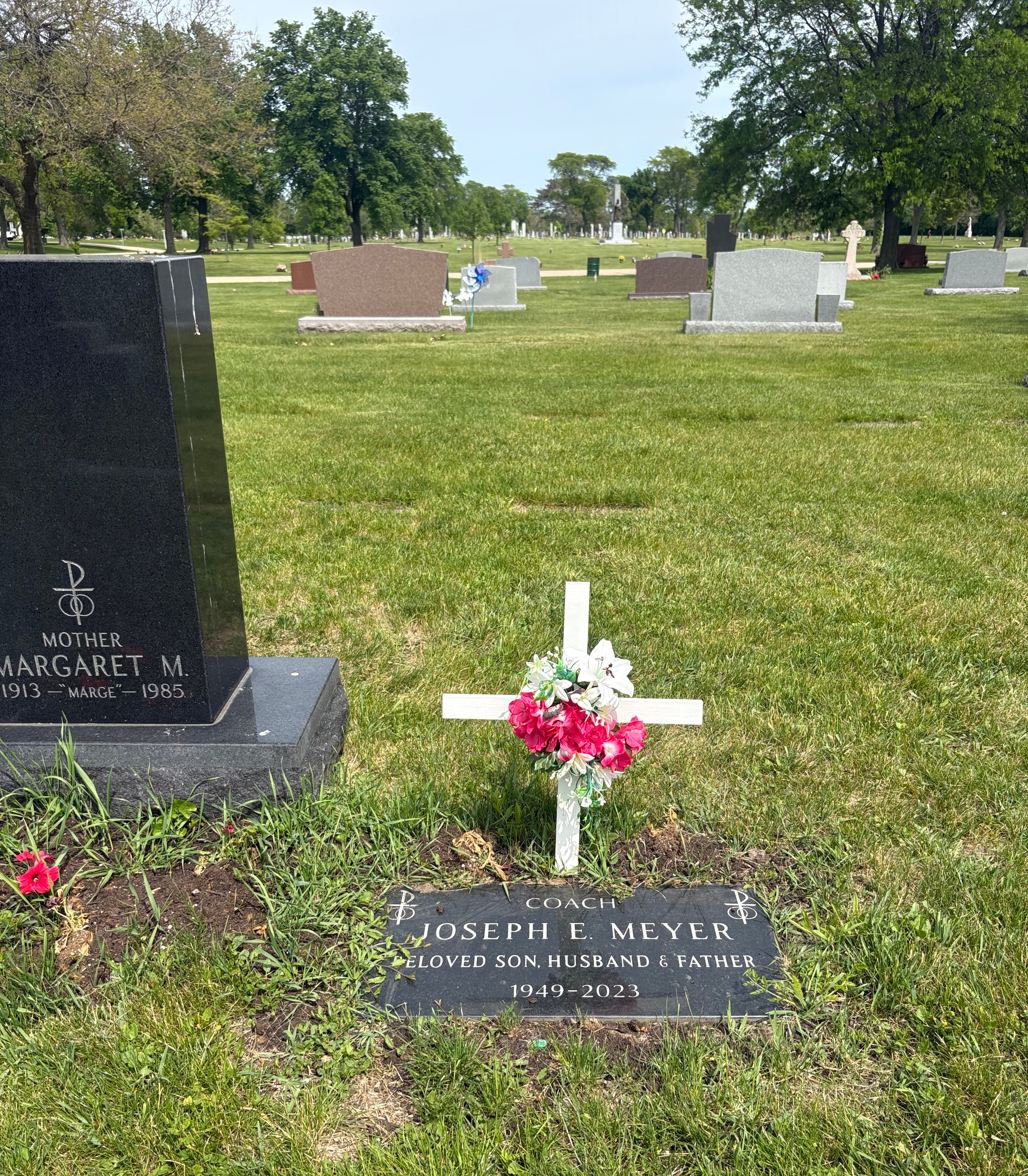
Meyer's grave at All Saints Cemetery

Meyer died peacefully on December 29, 2023, at the age of 74. A funeral service was held at the St. Vincent de Paul Church and he was laid to rest in All Saints Cemetery in Des Plaines, IL on January 4, 2024.

== Head coaching record ==
Record table
Season	Team	Overall	Conference	Standing	Postseason
DePaul Blue Demons (NCAA Division I Independent) (1984–1991)
1984–85	DePaul	19–10			NCAA Division I first round
1985–86	DePaul	18–13			NCAA Division I Sweet 16
1986–87	DePaul	28–3			NCAA Division I Sweet 16
1987–88	DePaul	22–8			NCAA Division I second round
1988–89	DePaul	21–12			NCAA Division I second round
1989–90	DePaul	20–15			NIT Quarterfinals
1990–91	DePaul	20–9			NCAA Division I first round
DePaul:		148–70			
DePaul Blue Demons (Great Midwest Conference) (1991–1995)
1991–92	DePaul	20–9	8–2	T–1st	NCAA Division I first round
1992–93	DePaul	16–15	3–7	5th	
1993–94	DePaul	16–12	4–8	T–5th	NIT First Round
1994–95	DePaul	17–11	6–6	5th	NIT First Round
DePaul:		69–47	21–23		
DePaul Blue Demons (Conference USA) (1995–1997)
1995–96	DePaul	11–18	2–12	4th (Blue)	
1996–97	DePaul	3–23	1–13	4th (Blue)	
DePaul:		14–41	3–25		
Total:		231–158	24–48		
National champion Postseason invitational champion Conference regular season champion Conference regular season and conference tournament champion Division regular season champion Division regular season and conference tournament champion Conference tournament champion

=== NBA D-League ===
Team	Year	G	W	L	W–L%	Finish	PG	PW	PL	PW–L%	Result
Ashville	2001–02	56	26	30	.464	6th in NBDL	—	—	—	—	Missed playoffs
Asheville	2002–03	50	23	27	.460	7th in NBDL	—	—	—	—	Missed playoffs
Asheville	2003–04	46	28	18	.609	1st in NBDL	2	2	0	1.000	Won Championship
Asheville	2004–05	48	27	21	.563	2nd in NBA D-League	2	2	0	1.000	Won Championship
Tulsa	2005–06	48	24	24	.500	T-5th in NBADL	—	—	—	—	Missed playoffs
Tulsa	2006–07	50	21	29	.420	4th in Eastern	—	—	—	—	Missed playoffs
Tulsa	2007–08	50	26	24	.520	3rd in Southwest	—	—	—	—	Missed playoffs
Career		348	175	173	.503		4	4	0	1.000	
