= DePaul College Prep =

Location
- 3300 N. Campbell Avenue; Chicago, Cook, Illinois 60618; USA; 41.9421°N 87.6921°W

Information
- Type: Private, Coeducational, secondary, parochial
- Religious affiliation: Roman Catholic
- Established: 1952 (as Gordon Tech); 2014 (as DePaul College Prep)
- Founder: Congregation of the Mission
- CEEB code: 140-850
- President: Mary A. Dempsey
- Principal: Megan Stanton-Anderson
- Staff: 110
- Teaching staff: 67
- Grades: 9–12
- Enrollment: 1315 (2025-2026)
- Average class size: 20
- Student to teacher ratio: 12:1
- Campus type: Urban
- Colors: Navy, White, Lake Blue
- Fight song: Root Root Root for DePaul
- Athletics conference: Chicago Catholic League (m); Girls Catholic Athletic Conference (f)
- Sports: Basketball (Males and Females), Volleyball (Males and Females), Football, Sailing, Wrestling, Baseball, Bowling, Cheer, Cross Country, Field Hockey, Golf, Hockey, Lacrosse, Tennis, Soccer, Softball, and Track & Field
- Mascot: Roscoe the Ram
- Nickname: DePaul Prep Rams
- Accreditation: North Central Association of Colleges and Schools
- Newspaper: The Ram Page
- School fees: Registration fee: $550
- Tuition: US$20,600
- Affiliation: Congregation of the Mission (Vincentians)
- Website: http://www.depaulprep.org

DePaul College Prep is a Vincentian Catholic college preparatory high school founded in 2014 in Chicago. The founders were a group of administrators and trustees of DePaul University and other individuals committed to Catholic education. As part of its mission and vision, DePaul Prep teaches the charism of St. Vincent de Paul, encouraging its students to serve those who live on the margins of society.

== History ==
In 2012, a group of trustees and administrators of DePaul University was asked by the Archdiocese of Chicago and the priests and brothers of the Congregation of the Resurrection to assist Gordon Tech High School. As the academic partnership with DePaul University progressed successfully, the school officially became DePaul College Prep in 2014.

In July 2019, in response to a rapidly growing enrollment, DePaul College Prep's Board of Directors acquired a new 17-acre campus and modern school buildings at 3300 N. Campbell, Chicago, Illinois. DePaul College Prep moved its operations to the new campus in August 2020. The religious sponsorship of the school transferred from the Resurrectionists to the Congregation of the Mission (“the Vincentians”) in September 2019. In August 2020, DePaul College Prep began the 2020–2021 school year on the school's new campus.

Since 2020, additional renovations and new construction have been completed. The 17-acre campus includes the 178,000 square foot Mary A. Dempsey Academic Center, comprising 62 modern classrooms, 2 student dining halls, 4 maker spaces, 10 state-of-the-art science labs, Black Box Theatre, strength training and weight room, library, chapel, and 2 student gathering spaces. The campus also includes an organic teaching garden, greenhouse, grass practice field, and 1,800-seat turf field stadium.

=== Athletics ===
DePaul Prep is a member of the Illinois High School Association (IHSA) and competes in two conferences: the Girls Catholic Athletic Conference (GCAC) and the Chicago Catholic League (CCL) for boys athletics.
There are 31 total athletic programs in 2024-2025 for the following sports: Basketball, Baseball, Bowling, Cheerleading, Cross Country, Field Hockey, Football, Golf, Hockey, Lacrosse, Rowing, Sailing, Soccer, Softball, Swimming, Tennis, Track & Field, Volleyball, and Wrestling.

The following teams have placed in the top four of their respective IHSA sponsored state tournaments:

- Boys Basketball
  - 2024-2025 - 3A State Champions
  - 2023-2024 - 3A State Champions
  - 2022-2023 - 2A State Champions
  - 2021-2022 - 3rd Place in IHSA Tournament
  - 2020-2021 (Covid) - #1 ranking in IL and #23 in the country
- Football
  - 2024-2025 - 4A State Champions
- Boys Cross Country
  - 2022-2023 - State Champions
- Girls Cross Country
  - 2022-2023 - 2nd Place
