= Stanley Brundy =

American basketball player (born 1967)

Stanley Brundy סטנלי ברונדי
Personal information
- Born: November 13, 1967 (age 59) New Orleans, Louisiana, U.S.
- Listed height: 6 ft 6 in (1.98 m)
- Listed weight: 210 lb (95 kg)

Career information
- High school: Crenshaw (Los Angeles, California)
- College: DePaul (1985–1989)
- NBA draft: 1989: 2nd round, 32nd overall pick
- Drafted by: New Jersey Nets
- Playing career: 1989–2005
- Position: Small forward
- Number: 21

Career history
- 1989–1990: New Jersey Nets
- 1991–1993: Rapid City Thrillers
- 1993–1994: Trotamundos de Carabobo
- 1995–1996: Leopardos de Bucaramanga
- 1999–2000: Hapoel Haifa
- 2000–2002: Maccabi Haifa
- 2002–2003: Bnei HaSharon
- 2003–2004: Elitzur Ashkelon
- 2004–2005: Maccabi Petah Tikva

Career highlights
- 4× Israeli League Rebounding Leader (2000–2002, 2005); LPB champion (1994); All-CBA First Team (1993); All-CBA Second Team (1992); CBA All-Defensive Team (1993); CBA Newcomer of the Year (1992); 2× CBA rebounding leader (1992, 1993)
- Stats at NBA.com
- Stats at Basketball Reference

Stanley Dwayne Brundy (Hebrew: סטנלי ברונדי; born November 13, 1967) is an American-Israeli former professional basketball player. He was selected by the New Jersey Nets in the second round (32nd pick overall) of the 1989 NBA draft. A 6-foot-6-inch (1.98 m), 210-pound (95 kg) forward from DePaul University, Brundy played in just one NBA season for the Nets (1989–90), averaging 2.3 points and 1.6 rebounds a game. He was suspended for the majority of that season after failing a drug test.

Brundy played for the Rapid City Thrillers in the Continental Basketball Association (CBA) from 1991 to 1993 and was selected as the CBA Newcomer of the Year and named to the All-CBA First Team in 1993, All-CBA Second Team in 1992 and All-Defensive Team in 1993.

Brundy also played in Venezuela, Colombia, Turkey (2nd division), the Philippines, France (2nd division), and Israel. He was the top rebounder in the Israel Basketball Premier League in four seasons: 2000–02 and 2005.
