= Dallas Comegys =

American basketball player (born 1964)

Personal information
- Born: August 17, 1964 (age 62) Philadelphia, Pennsylvania, U.S.
- Listed height: 6 ft 9 in (2.06 m)
- Listed weight: 205 lb (93 kg)

Career information
- High school: Roman Catholic (Philadelphia, Pennsylvania)
- College: DePaul (1983–1987)
- NBA draft: 1987: 1st round, 21st overall pick
- Drafted by: Atlanta Hawks
- Playing career: 1987–2006
- Position: Power forward
- Number: 45, 22

Career history
- 1987–1988: New Jersey Nets
- 1988–1989: San Antonio Spurs
- 1989–1990: Oximesa Granada
- 1990–1991: Dinamo Sassari
- 1991: Philadelphia Spirit
- 1991–1992: Dinamo Sassari
- 1992: Philadelphia Spirit
- 1992–1994: Fortitudo Bologna
- 1994–1995: Montepaschi Siena
- 1995–1998: Fenerbahçe
- 1998–1999: SNAI Montecatini
- 1999–2000: Maccabi Tel Aviv
- 2000–2001: Chicago Skyliners
- 2002: Pınar Karşıyaka
- 2002: Pennsylvania ValleyDawgs
- 2003–2004: Delaware Destroyers
- 2006: NEPA Breakers

Career highlights
- Second-team All-American – NABC (1987); Third-team All-American – AP, UPI (1987); Second-team Parade All-American (1983); McDonald's All-American (1983)
- Stats at NBA.com
- Stats at Basketball Reference

Dallas Alonzo Comegys (born August 17, 1964) is an American former professional basketball player.

== College career ==
Comegys played collegiate basketball for the DePaul Blue Demons in the NCAA Division I from 1983 to 1987.

== Professional career ==
Comegys was selected by the Atlanta Hawks with the 21st overall pick of the 1987 NBA draft. He was traded to the New Jersey Nets in exchange for a second-round draft choice in either 1989 or 1990. He played 75 games (17 starts) for the Nets in 1987–88, averaging 5.6 ppg, adding totals of 218 rebounds and 70 blocks.

Comegys was traded to the San Antonio Spurs in exchange for Walter Berry in August 1988. With the Spurs, he played 67 games (10 starts), with 6.5 points and 3.5 rebounds on average in 1988–89

He then moved to Europe, playing a good part of his career in Italy, mostly in the second division Serie A2, with some spells in the top tier Serie A. There he played for Banco di Sardegna Sassari, Fortitudo Bologna, Comerson Siena – with whom he led the Serie A in rebounding in 1995 – and SNAI Montecatini.

Comegys also played in the Spanish Liga ACB for Oximesa Granada, his first experience abroad, in the Turkish Basketball League for Fenerbahçe and Pınar Karşıyaka. During his time at Fenerbahçe he was shot after leaving a nightclub. He later played in the Israeli Basketball Super League for Maccabi Tel Aviv and for various U.S. minor league teams.

== Career statistics ==
Legend
GP	Games played	GS	Games started	MPG	Minutes per game
FG%	Field goal percentage	3P%	3-point field goal percentage	FT%	Free throw percentage
RPG	Rebounds per game	APG	Assists per game	SPG	Steals per game
BPG	Blocks per game	PPG	Points per game	**Bold**	Career high

=== NBA ===
==== Regular season ====
Year	Team	GP	GS	MPG	FG%	3P%	FT%	RPG	APG	SPG	BPG	PPG
1987–88	New Jersey	**75**	**17**	15.0	.430	.000	**.707**	2.9	**.9**	.5	**.9**	5.6
1988–89	San Antonio	67	10	**16.7**	**.487**	.000	.658	**3.5**	.4	**.6**	**.9**	**6.5**
Career		142	27	15.8	.457	.000	.682	3.2	.7	.5	.9	6.0
