= DePaul Blue Demons men's basketball =

Men's college basketball team at DePaul

2026–27 DePaul Blue Demons men's basketball team
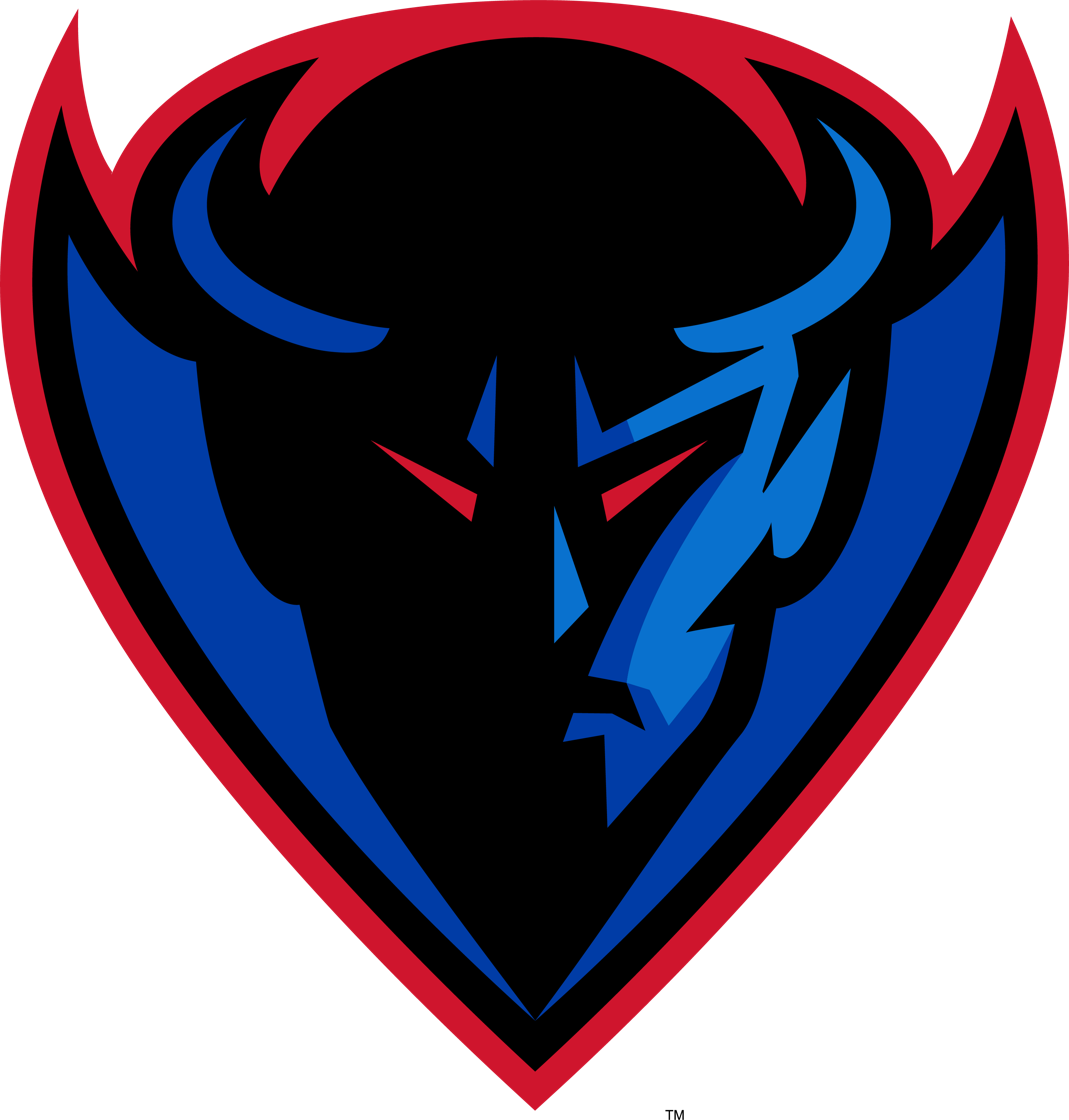
- University: DePaul University
- Athletic director: DeWayne Peevy
- Head coach: Chris Holtmann; 3rd season, 30–35 (.462)
- Location: Chicago, Illinois
- Arena: Wintrust Arena (capacity: 10,387)
- NCAA division: Division I
- Conference: Big East
- Nickname: Blue Demons
- Colors: DePaul blue and scarlet
- All-time record: 1546–1157 (.572)
- NCAA tournament record: 21–25 (.457)

NCAA Division I tournament Final Four
- 1943, 1979
Other NCAA Division I tournament results
Elite Eight	1943, 1978, 1979
Sweet Sixteen	1953, 1959, 1960, 1965, 1976, 1978, 1979, 1984, 1986, 1987
Appearances	1943, 1953, 1956, 1959, 1960, 1965, 1976, 1978, 1979, 1980, 1981, 1982, 1984, 1985, 1986, 1987, 1988, 1989, 1991, 1992, 2000, 2004

NIT champions
- 1945

Conference regular-season champions
- GMC: 1992 C-USA: 2004

Uniforms
Home	Away	Alternate

The DePaul Blue Demons men's basketball program is the NCAA Division I intercollegiate men's basketball program of DePaul University in Chicago, Illinois. The team competes in the Big East Conference. DePaul has appeared 22 times in the NCAA Tournament, and have made two Final Fours. DePaul's last NCAA tournament victory was in 2004.

The Blue Demons play home games at Wintrust Arena at the McCormick Place convention center on Chicago's Near South Side.

== History ==
DePaul was an independent from 1923 to 1991, despite having a team since 1908. It joined the Great Midwest Conference in 1991 which later merged with the Metro Conference in 1995 to become Conference USA, in which DePaul was a member through 2005. DePaul left for the Big East Conference in 2005 and was a member until 2012 when it joined the reconfigured Big East in 2013.

=== Early history (1923–1942) ===
Robert L. Stevenson was the first head coach in DePaul basketball history. In his one season as coach during the 1923–24 season, he coached the Blue Demons to a record of 8–6. Harry Adams was head coach for the 1924–25 season and finished with a record of 6–13. Eddie Anderson was head coach from 1925 to 1929 and compiled an overall record of 37–26.

In 1929, Jim Kelly became head coach at DePaul where he compiled a record of 99–22 in his 7 seasons as coach before leaving in 1936. Tom Haggerty coached DePaul from 1936 to 1940 and compiled an overall record of 63–32. Bill Wendt coached DePaul for 2 seasons from 1940 to 1941 and had a record of 23–20.

=== Ray Meyer era (1942–1984) ===
Naismith Memorial Basketball Hall of Fame head coach Ray Meyer coached at DePaul for 42 years from 1942 to 1984 and finished with an overall 724–354 record (.672). He coached his teams to 21 post-season appearances (13 NCAA, eight NIT). Meyer led his teams to two Final Four appearances in the 1943 NCAA basketball tournament and 1979 NCAA Division I basketball tournament. (Note: At the time, the NCAA did not sponsor championships in women's sports.) Meyer's 1943 Final Four appearance was his first season coaching DePaul. His teams were a No. 1 seed in its NCAA regional three years in a row in 1980, 1981 and 1982; however, those teams all lost their first game to #8 seeds in upsets. Meyer led DePaul past Bowling Green to capture the 1945 National Invitation Tournament, the school's only post-season title. In total, Meyer recorded 37 winning seasons and twelve 20-win seasons, including seven straight from 1978 to 1984.

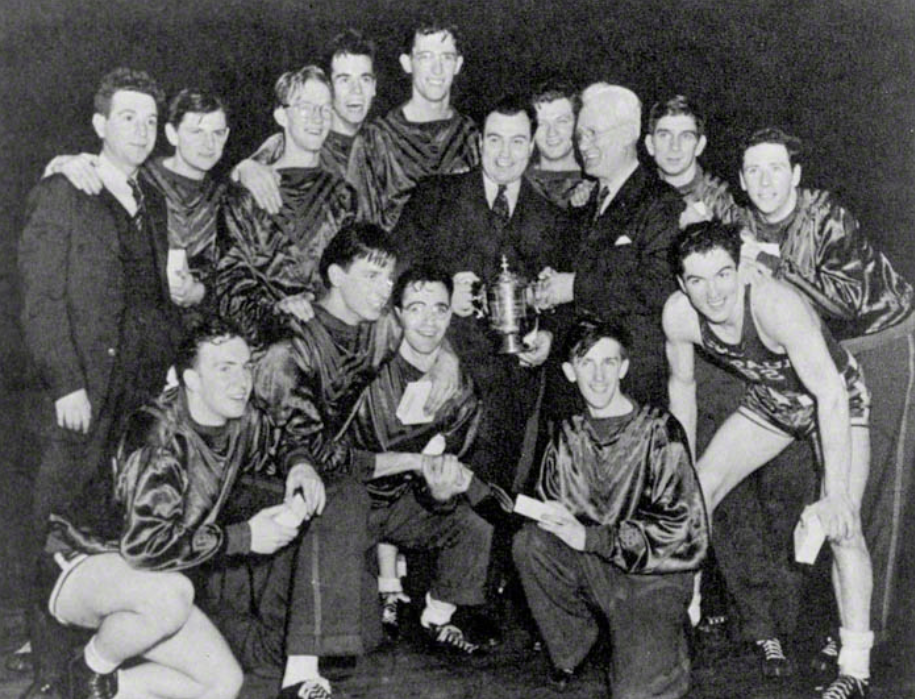
1945 NIT champions

Meyer coached George Mikan who was inducted into the Naismith Memorial Basketball Hall of Fame in 1959, made the 25th and 35th NBA Anniversary Teams of 1970 and 1980, and was elected one of the NBA's 50 Greatest Players ever in 1996. On October 21, 2021, it was also announced that Mikan had made the NBA 75th Anniversary Team. Meyer also coached the 1980 Naismith College Player of the Year, Mark Aguirre.

During Ray Meyer's tenure, the Blue Demons originally played in University Auditorium before moving to Alumni Hall in 1956. For the start of the 1980 season, DePaul men's basketball moved to the Rosemont Horizon later renamed Allstate Arena.

=== Joey Meyer era (1984–1997) ===
Joey Meyer was head coach of DePaul from 1984 to 1997 compiling an overall record of 231–158. He started as an assistant coach at DePaul for eleven seasons under his father, Ray Meyer. When Ray Meyer retired in 1984, Joey Meyer was promoted to head coach.

Joey Meyer led DePaul to seven NCAA Tournament appearances in his first eight seasons, including back-to-back Sweet Sixteen appearances in his second and third seasons. In the 1986 tournament, #12-seeded DePaul—led by freshman guard Rod Strickland (14.1 ppg season average) and junior Dallas Comegys (13.8 ppg) -- upset #5-seeded Virginia and #4-seeded Oklahoma in the East regional before losing to top-seeded Duke 74–67. In 1987, the Blue Demons—again led by Comegys (17.5 ppg) and Strickland (16.3 ppg) -- finished the regular season 26–2 and received a #3 seed in the Midwest regional of the 1987 tournament. They defeated #14-seeded Louisiana Tech and #6-seeded St. John's before losing to #10-seeded LSU. Meyer was honored as the Chevrolet Coach of the Year in 1987. Besides seven NCAA tournament appearances, Meyer led the Blue Demons to three appearances in the National Invitation Tournament.

In both 1988 and 1989, DePaul reached the second round of the NCAA tournament, but they were on a downward trajectory. In 1992, the Blue Demons were co-champions of the newly formed Great Midwest Conference but made their last NCAA tournament appearance under Meyer. In 1996, they finished 11–18, their first losing season since 1971, and the next year, a young DePaul team finished 3–23. Meyer was dismissed on April 28, 1997.

=== Pat Kennedy era (1997–2002) ===
Pat Kennedy was named head coach after Joey Meyer. It was the first time a member of the Meyer family hadn't coached DePaul basketball in 55 years. Kennedy coached DePaul from 1997 to 2002 and finished with an overall record of 67–85.

=== Dave Leitao era – First tenure (2002–2005) ===
Dave Leitao was named head coach at DePaul for the 2002–03 season. His teams made post-season play in all three of his seasons as head coach. In his second season, his team advanced to the second round of the 2004 NCAA tournament before being eliminated by eventual national champion Connecticut. His teams also played in the 2003 and 2005 NIT Tournaments. In his first stint as head coach at Depaul, he finished with a 58–34 overall record. Leitao left to become the head coach at the University of Virginia in 2005.

=== Jerry Wainwright era (2005–2010) ===
Jerry Wainwright was named DePaul head coach in 2005. In his first season he finished with a 12–15 record. In his second season in 2006–07, the Blue Demons beat #5 Kansas, pulling off one of the greatest upsets in school history. They also beat 2006 NCAA tournament teams California, Northwestern State, Marquette, Connecticut and Villanova with Wainwright leading the Blue Demons to the 2007 National Invitation Tournament quarterfinals before losing to Air Force. Four games into the 2007–08 season, Wainwright logged his 200th career win as a head coach, but the team finished with a 10–19 record. The 2008–2009 season saw DePaul finish 9–24 overall and 0–18 in regular season Big East play. Wainwright began the 2009–10 season as head coach, but was fired on January 11, 2010, after a 7–8 start to the season. He still had two years remaining on his contract at the time of his firing. Wainwright finished with a 59–80 overall record in his five years at DePaul. Assistant coach Tracy Webster was named interim head coach for the remainder of the 2009–10 season and finished with a 1–15 record.

=== Oliver Purnell era (2010–2015) ===
On April 6, 2010, Oliver Purnell, formerly of Clemson University signed a seven-year deal with DePaul. In his first season in 2010–11, Purnell finished with a record of 7–24. The rest of his tenure saw his teams with finish with similar records of 12–19 during the 2011–2012 season, 11–21 during the 2012–2013 season, 12–21 during the 2013–2014 season and 12–20 in 2014–15. At the conclusion of the 2014–2015 season, Purnell announced his resignation. He finished with an overall record of 54–105 at DePaul.

=== Dave Leitao era – Second tenure (2015–2021) ===
Dave Leitao returned for his second stint as DePaul head basketball coach for the 2015–2016 season. The team finished with a record of 9–22 in his first season back with the Blue Demons. The 2016–2017 season saw the Blue Demons finish with a 9–23 record in Leitao's second season. This season would be DePaul's last season playing at Allstate Arena in Rosemont, Illinois after 37 years at the venue. For the 2017–2018 season, the Blue Demons moved back to Chicago to play their home games at 10,387-seat Wintrust Arena at the McCormick Place convention center. The first season at Wintrust Arena saw the Blue Demons return to double-digit wins finishing with a record of 11–20 in Leitao's third season.

Following the 2017–2018 season, DePaul's eleventh straight losing season under coaches hired by current Athletic Director Jean Lenti Ponsetto, a group of "concerned students and alumni" purchased a full-page advertisement in the Chicago Sun-Times calling for change within the school's Athletic Department. Additional reasons the students and alumni wanted change was that since the 1989–90 season, DePaul had won only one NCAA tournament game in the 29 seasons that transpired. DePaul had also only been to two NCAA Tournaments since the 1991–92 season, hadn't qualified for the NCAA Tournament since the 2003–04 season and the Blue Demons had not made postseason play since 2006–07. Additionally, DePaul finished last in the Big East eight out of the past ten seasons including a tie for last place during the 2017–18 season.

The 2018–2019 season saw a turnaround for DePaul as the Blue Demons finished with a 19–17 overall record. In Leitao's fourth season, he led the Blue Demons to the 2019 College Basketball Invitational post-season tournament. The team finished as runner-up to the University of South Florida Bulls. In the Best of Three Championship series, DePaul beat South Florida in game 2, but dropped games one and three to the Bulls to give DePaul a second-place finish in the tournament.

=== Tony Stubblefield era – (2021–2024) ===
On April 1, 2021, Tony Stubblefield was hired as head coach. He previously served as an assistant coach at Oregon. Stubblefield was fired on January 22, 2024 after a troubling partial season of (3–15). Only managing to beat South Dakota, Louisville, and Chicago State. All home games. He returned to his previous assistant coaching position at Oregon.

On February 24, Terry Cummings had his No. 32 (1979–1982) jersey retired by the program. Becoming only the third player in franchise history to receive the honor and the first since Mark Aguirre in 1996.

Assistant coach Matt Brady served as the interim head coach for the remainder of the 2023-24 season finishing (3–29) (.093) overall and (0–20) in the Big East before leaving and becoming the assistant coach at High Point University. Making it the worst season since 1996–97 season (4–36) and the worst in program history.

=== Chris Holtmann era ― (2024–present) ===
==== 2024–25 Season ====
On March 14, 2024, former Butler and Ohio State head coach Chris Holtmann was hired as the new head coach on a six-year deal. With Ohio State's former assistant coach Jack Owens also being hired.

Holtmann and the 2024–25 team went 7–1 to start the season, losing their first game on the road to Texas Tech in the program's final Big East–Big 12 Battle on December 4, 2024. On January 17, 2025, the team won their first Big East Conference game since January 18, 2023. They would defeat Georgetown at Capital One Arena 73–68, their first conference win in 1 year and 364 days after 39 straight losses. The team would follow that up on February 2, 2025 with their first conference win at home since January 10, 2023, defeating Seton Hall 74–57. This ended a 2 year and 24 day drought.

On February 22, Dave Corzine had his No. 40 (1974–1978) jersey retired by the program. Becoming the fourth player in franchise history to receive the honor.

The improvement could be seen compared to the last season as the team finished (14–20) overall and (4–16) in the conference, finishing with the #10 seed. The team even managed to reach the quarterfinals of the 2025 Big East tournament, where they would be eliminated following a hard fought battle against #2 seed Creighton, losing 81–85 in double-overtime.

On March 17, 2025, it was announced that the Blue Demons would play in the College Basketball Crown inaugural postseason tournament as the #15 seed. The team played #2 seed Cincinnati in the First Round at MGM Grand Garden Arena on April 1, losing 61–83.

==== 2025–26 Season ====
It was announced on June 11 that the 2025–26 Blue Demons would be participating in the men's 2025 Emerald Coast Classic along with Drake, Georgia Tech, and former 2021 Classic champion LSU. The event took place during Thanksgiving weekend (Nov. 28-29) at Northwest Florida State College in Niceville. The team would become the runners-up, falling to LSU 63–96 in the final.

On November 26, the program announced that Rod Strickland would have his No. 10 (1985-1988) jersey retired by the program during a game on February 3, 2026 against St. John's. Becoming the fifth player in franchise history to receive the honor.

The Blue Demons finished the overall season 16–16 and 8–12 in the conference, placing sixth. The highest Big East tournament seed since joining the original conference in 2005.

==== 2026–27 Season ====
It was announced on May 21, 2026 that the 2026–27 Blue Demons would compete in their first Fort Myers Tip-Off over Thanksgiving (Nov. 24-26). The tournament will also include Purdue, Pittsburgh, and Oklahoma at Suncoast Credit Union Arena.

On September 29, DePaul Athletics announnced that head coach Chris Holtmann had signed a contract extension through the 2030–31 season. On November 17, the program announced that Quentin Richardson would have his No. 3 (1998-2000) jersey retired by the program during a game on March 6, 2026 against Marquette.

== Major upsets ==
- In 1950, the Blue Demons upset #2-ranked St. John's 74–68.
- In 1952–53, the #19 Blue Demons upset #1-ranked and #3-ranked La Salle 63–61 and 68–62 respectively. The Explorers were 1952 NIT champions the previous season and 1954 NCAA champions the following season.
- In 1979, the #20 Blue Demons upset #9-ranked Marquette 62–56 and the #15 Blue Demons upset #2-ranked Notre Dame 76–72.
- In 1983, the #13 Blue Demons upset #3-ranked Georgetown 63–61. The Hoyas would later win both the Big East tournament and the 1984 NCAA tournament.
- In 1986, the Blue Demons upset #6-ranked St. John's 81–72.
- In 1990, the Blue Demons upset #3-ranked Cincinnati 61–59 in 2OT in the Second Round of the NIT.
- In 2006, the Blue Demons upset #5-ranked Kansas 64–57 in front of a sold-out crowd at Allstate Arena.
- In 2016, the Blue Demons upset #11-ranked Providence 77–70.
- In 2020, the Blue Demons upset #5-ranked Butler 79–66, defeating the 2019 Hall of Fame Classic champions.
- In 2023, the Blue Demons upset #8-ranked Xavier 73–72, snapping the Musketeers's 11-game win streak.

== Championships ==
=== Final Fours ===
DePaul has played in two Final Fours in the NCAA Division I men's basketball tournament. The Blue Demons are 0–2 all-time in the Final Four.

Year	Coach	Record
1942–43	Ray Meyer	19–5
1978–79	Ray Meyer	26–6
Total Final Fours:	2

=== NIT Championships ===
DePaul has won one National Invitation Tournament (NIT) championship.

Year	Coach	Record	Result
1944–45	Ray Meyer	21–3	DePaul 71 Bowling Green Falcons 54
Total NIT championships:	1		

=== Conference championships ===
DePaul has won a total of two conference championships since leaving independent status following the 1990–91 season.

Year	Conference	Coach	Overall Record	Conference Record
1991–92	Great Midwest Conference	Joey Meyer	20–9	8–2
2003–04	Conference USA	Dave Leitao	22–10	12–4
Total conference championships:			2	

== Postseason ==
=== NCAA tournament results ===
The Blue Demons have appeared in the NCAA tournament 22 times. Their combined record is 21–25, although the NCAA vacated their appearances from 1986 to 1989, thereby making their record officially 15–21.

Year	Seed	Round	Opponent	Result
1943		Elite Eight; Final Four	Dartmouth; Georgetown	W 46–35; L 49–53
1953		First Round; Sweet Sixteen; Regional 3rd Place Game	Miami(OH); Indiana; Pennsylvania	W 74–72; L 80–82; L 70–90
1956		First Round	Wayne State	L 63–72
1959		First Round; Sweet Sixteen; Regional 3rd Place Game	Portland; Kansas State; TCU	W 57–56; L 70–102; L 65–71
1960		First Round; Sweet Sixteen; Regional 3rd Place Game	Air Force; Cincinnati; Texas	W 69–63; L 59–99; W 67–61
1965		First Round; Sweet Sixteen; Regional 3rd Place Game	Eastern Kentucky; Vanderbilt; Dayton	W 99–52; L 78–83 ^{OT} L 69–75
1976		First Round; Sweet Sixteen	Virginia; VMI	W 69–60; L 66–71 ^{OT}
1978		First Round; Sweet Sixteen; Elite Eight	Creighton; Louisville; Notre Dame	W 80–76; W 90–89 ^{OT} L 64–84
1979	#2	Second Round; Sweet Sixteen; Elite Eight; Final Four; National 3rd Place Game	#7 USC #3 Marquette #1 UCLA #1 Indiana State #9 Penn	W 89–78; W 62–56; W 95–91; L 74–76; W 96–93
1980	#1	Second Round	#8 UCLA	L 71–77
1981	#1	Second Round	#9 Saint Joseph's	L 48–49
1982	#1	Second Round	#8 Boston College	L 75–82
1984	#1	Second Round; Sweet Sixteen	#8 Illinois State #4 Wake Forest	W 75–61; L 71–73 ^{OT}
1985	#10	First Round	#7 Syracuse	L 65–70
1986*	#12	First Round; Second Round; Sweet Sixteen	#5 Virginia #4 Oklahoma #1 Duke	W 72–68; W 74–69; L 67–74
1987*	#3	First Round; Second Round; Sweet Sixteen	#14 Louisiana Tech #6 St. John's #10 LSU	W 76–62; W 83–75 ^{OT} L 58–63
1988*	#5	First Round; Second Round	#12 Wichita State #4 Kansas State	W 83–62; L 58–66
1989*	#12	First Round; Second Round	#5 Memphis State #4 UNLV	W 66–63; L 70–85
1991	#9	First Round	#8 Georgia Tech	L 70–87
1992	#5	First Round	#12 New Mexico State	L 73–81
2000	#9	First Round	#8 Kansas	L 77–81 ^{OT}
2004	#7	First Round; Second Round	#10 Dayton #2 Connecticut	W 76–69 ^{OT} L 55–72

* Vacated by the NCAA

=== NIT results ===
The Blue Demons have appeared in the National Invitation Tournament (NIT) 16 times. Their combined record is 17–17. They were NIT Champions in 1945.

Year	Round	Opponent	Result
1940	Quarterfinals; Semifinals; 3rd Place Game	Long Island; Colorado; Oklahoma A&M	W 45–38; L 37–52; L 22–23
1944	Quarterfinals; Semifinals; Final	Muhlenberg; Oklahoma A&M; St. John's	W 68–45; W 41–38; L 39–47
1945	Quarterfinals; Semifinals; Final	West Virginia; Rhode Island; Bowling Green	W 76–52; W 97–53; W 71–54
1948	Quarterfinals; Semifinals; 3rd Place Game	NC State; NYU; WKU	W 75–64; L 59–72; L 59–61
1961	Quarterfinals	Providence	L 67–73
1963	Quarterfinals	Villanova	L 51–63
1964	Quarterfinals	NYU	L 66–79
1966	First Round	NYU	L 65–68
1983	First Round; Second Round; Quarterfinals; Semifinals; Final	Minnesota; Northwestern; Ole Miss; Nebraska; Fresno State	W 76–73; W 65–63; W 75–67; W 68–58; L 60–69
1990	First Round; Second Round; Quarterfinals	Creighton; Cincinnati; Saint Louis	W 89–72; W 61–59; L 47–54
1994	First Round	Northwestern	L 68–69
1995	First Round	Iowa	L 87–96
1999	First Round; Second Round	Northwestern; California	W 69–64; L 57–58
2003	First Round	North Carolina	L 72–83
2005	First Round; Second Round	Missouri; Texas A&M	W 75–70; L 72–75
2007	First Round; Second Round; Quarterfinals	Hofstra; Kansas State; Air Force	W 83–71; W 70–65; L 51–52

=== CBI results ===
The Blue Demons have appeared in the College Basketball Invitational (CBI) one time. Their record is 4–2.

Year	Round	Opponent	Result
2019	First Round; Quarterfinals; Semifinals; Finals Game 1 Finals Game 2 Finals Game 3	Central Michigan; Longwood; Coastal Carolina; South Florida; South Florida; South Florida	W 100–86; W 97–89; W 92–87; L 61–63; W 100–96 ^{OT} L 65–77

=== CBC results ===
Depaul has appeared in the College Basketball Crown once. Their overall record is 0–1.

Year	Round	Opponent	Result
2025	First Round	Cincinnati	L 61–83

== Honors ==
=== Hall of Fame inductees ===
Naismith Memorial Basketball Hall of Fame

Person	Position
George Mikan	Player
Ray Meyer	Coach

National Collegiate Basketball Hall of Fame

Person	Position
George Mikan	Player
Ray Meyer	Coach
Mark Aguirre	Player

=== Retired numbers ===
DePaul has retired five jersey numbers.

DePaul Blue Demons retired numbers
No.	Player	Pos.	Career	Year Retired
99	George Mikan	C	1942–46	1990
24	Mark Aguirre	SF	1978–81	1996
32	Terry Cummings	PF	1979–82	2024
40	Dave Corzine	C	1974–78	2025
10	Rod Strickland	PG	1985–88	2026

=== Individual Player honors ===
National Player of the Year
1944	George Mikan	Center	Helms
1945	George Mikan	Center	Helms
1980	Mark Aguirre	Guard	Naismith, AP, UPI, Oscar Robertson Trophy
1999	Quentin Richardson	Guard	Wayne Tisdale Award

Conference Player of the Year
1995	Tom Kleinschmidt	Guard	Great Midwest Conference
1999	Quentin Richardson	Guard	Conference USA

Conference Individual Awards
1999	Quentin Richardson	Guard	C-USA Freshman of the Year
2004	Drake Diener	Guard	C-USA Scholar Athlete of the Year
2005	Drake Diener	Guard	C-USA Scholar Athlete of the Year
2011	Cleveland Melvin	Forward	Big East Rookie of the Year
2014	Billy Garrett Jr.	Guard	Big East Rookie of the Year
2017	Billy Garrett Jr.	Guard	Big East Scholar-Athlete of the Year
2019	Paul Reed	Forward	Big East Most Improved Player

All-Freshman team selections

1992	Howard Nathan	Great Midwest
1993	Kris Hill	Great Midwest
1996	Thomas Cooper	C-USA
1997	Doc Taylor	C-USA
1999	Quentin Richardson	C-USA
1999	Bobby Simmons	C-USA
1999	Lance Williams	C-USA
2000	Steven Hunter	C-USA
2001	Imari Sawyer	C-USA
2004	Sammy Mejía	C-USA

2006	Wilson Chandler	Big East
2008	Mac Koshwal	Big East
2008	Dar Tucker	Big East
2011	Cleveland Melvin	Big East
2011	Brandon Young	Big East
2014	Billy Garrett Jr.	Big East
2014	Tommy Hamilton IV	Big East
2016	Eli Cain	Big East
2020	Romeo Weems	Big East

All-Conference team selections

Year	Name	Pos.	Conf.
1992	David Booth†	F	Great Midwest
1992	Stephen Howard†	F	Great Midwest
1992	Terry Davis‡	G	Great Midwest
1993	Tom Kleinschmidt†	G	Great Midwest
1994	Tom Kleinschmidt†	G	Great Midwest
1995	Tom Kleinschmidt†	G	Great Midwest
1999	Quentin Richardson†	G	C-USA
2000	Quentin Richardson†	G	C-USA
2000	Bobby Simmons‡	F	C-USA

Year	Name	Pos.	Conf.
2004	Andre Brown‡	C	C-USA
2004	Delonte Holland‡	F	C-USA
2005	Quemont Greer†	F	C-USA
2007	Wilson Chandler‡	F	Big East
2007	Sammy Mejía‡	G	Big East
2008	Draelon Burns‡	G	Big East
2019	Max Strus‡	G	Big East
2020	Paul Reed‡	G	Big East
2022	Javon Freeman-Liberty‡	G	Big East

† – denotes First-Team All-Conference
‡ – denotes Second-Team All-Conference

=== All-Americans ===
Player	Year(s)	Team(s)
Ed Campion	1937	Madison Square Garden (1st)
Bobby Neu	1938	Madison Square Garden (2nd)
Bobby Neu	1939	Madison Square Garden (1st)
Stan Szukala	1939	Madison Square Garden (2nd)
Stan Szukala	1940	Madison Square Garden (2nd)
Lou Possner	1940	Madison Square Garden (2nd)
Elmer Gainer	1941	Madison Square Garden (2nd)
George Mikan	1943	Helms (2nd)
George Mikan	1944	Consensus First Team – Helms (1st), Converse (1st), Pic (1st), Sporting News (1st)
George Mikan	1945	Consensus First Team – Helms (1st), Converse (1st), Pic (1st), Argosy (1st), Sporting News (1st)
George Mikan	1946	Consensus First Team – Helms (1st), Converse (1st), True (1st), Sporting News (1st)
Dick Triptow	1944	Consensus Second Team – Converse (2nd), Pic (2nd), Sporting News (3rd)
Ed Mikan	1948	Helms (3rd)
Ron Feiereisel	1953	UPI (3rd)
Dave Corzine	1978	AP (2nd), UPI (3rd)
Mark Aguirre	1980	Consensus First Team – AP (1st), USBWA (1st), NABC (1st), UPI (1st)
Mark Aguirre	1981	Consensus First Team – AP (1st), USBWA (1st), NABC (1st), UPI (1st)
Clyde Bradshaw	1981	UPI (3rd)
Terry Cummings	1982	Consensus First Team – AP (2nd), USBWA (2nd), NABC (2nd), UPI (1st)
Dallas Comegys	1987	AP (3rd), NABC (2nd), UPI (3rd)
Rod Strickland	1988	UPI (3rd)

=== National Coach of the Year ===
DePaul has had two of their coaches awarded the National Coach of the Year, done on five occasions.

Person	Year Awarded
Ray Meyer	1978, 1979, 1980, 1984
Joey Meyer	1987

== Professional players ==
=== Blue Demons in the NBA ===
==== Current players ====
Player	Team
Max Strus	Los Angeles Clippers
Paul Reed	Detroit Pistons

==== All-time NBA/ABA players ====
The following former DePaul Blue Demons have played in the NBA or original ABA:

- Mark Aguirre
- Andre Brown
- Stanley Brundy
- Em Bryant
- Howie Carl
- Wilson Chandler
- Dallas Comegys
- Tyrone Corbin
- Dave Corzine
- Terry Cummings
- Gene Dyker
- Kevin Edwards
- Ron Feiereisel
- Javon Freeman-Liberty
- Elmer Gainer
- Gary Garland
- Billy Garrett Jr.
- Bato Govedarica
- Myke Henry
- Stephen Howard
- Steven Hunter
- Johnny Jorgensen
- Whitey Kachan
- Paul McPherson
- Ed Mikan
- George Mikan
- Nick Ongenda
- Errol Palmer
- Jack Phelan
- Paul Reed
- Quentin Richardson
- Bill Robinzine
- Bobby Simmons
- Ron Sobieszczyk
- Rod Strickland
- Gene Stump
- Max Strus
- Dick Triptow

=== Blue Demons in international leagues ===
==== Current players overseas ====
Player	Team	Country
Yor Anei	Brampton Honey Badgers	(Canada)
Javon Freeman-Liberty	Montreal Alliance	(Canada)
Umoja Gibson	KK Cedevita Olimpija	(Slovenia)
C.J. Gunn	Calgary Surge	(Canada)
Javan Johnson	Scarborough Shooting Stars	(Canada)
Nick Ongenda	Bàsquet Manresa	(Spain)
Brandon Young	Shandong Honey Badger	(China)

==== All-time players overseas ====
The following former DePaul Blue Demons have played professionally in leagues outside of the United States:

- David Booth
- Tom Kleinschmidt
- Draelon Burns
- Cliff Clinkscales
- Drake Diener
- Marty Embry
- Umoja Gibson
- Brandon Johnson
- Sammy Mejía
- Brandon Young
- Dar Tucker

== Arenas ==
=== Wintrust Arena ===
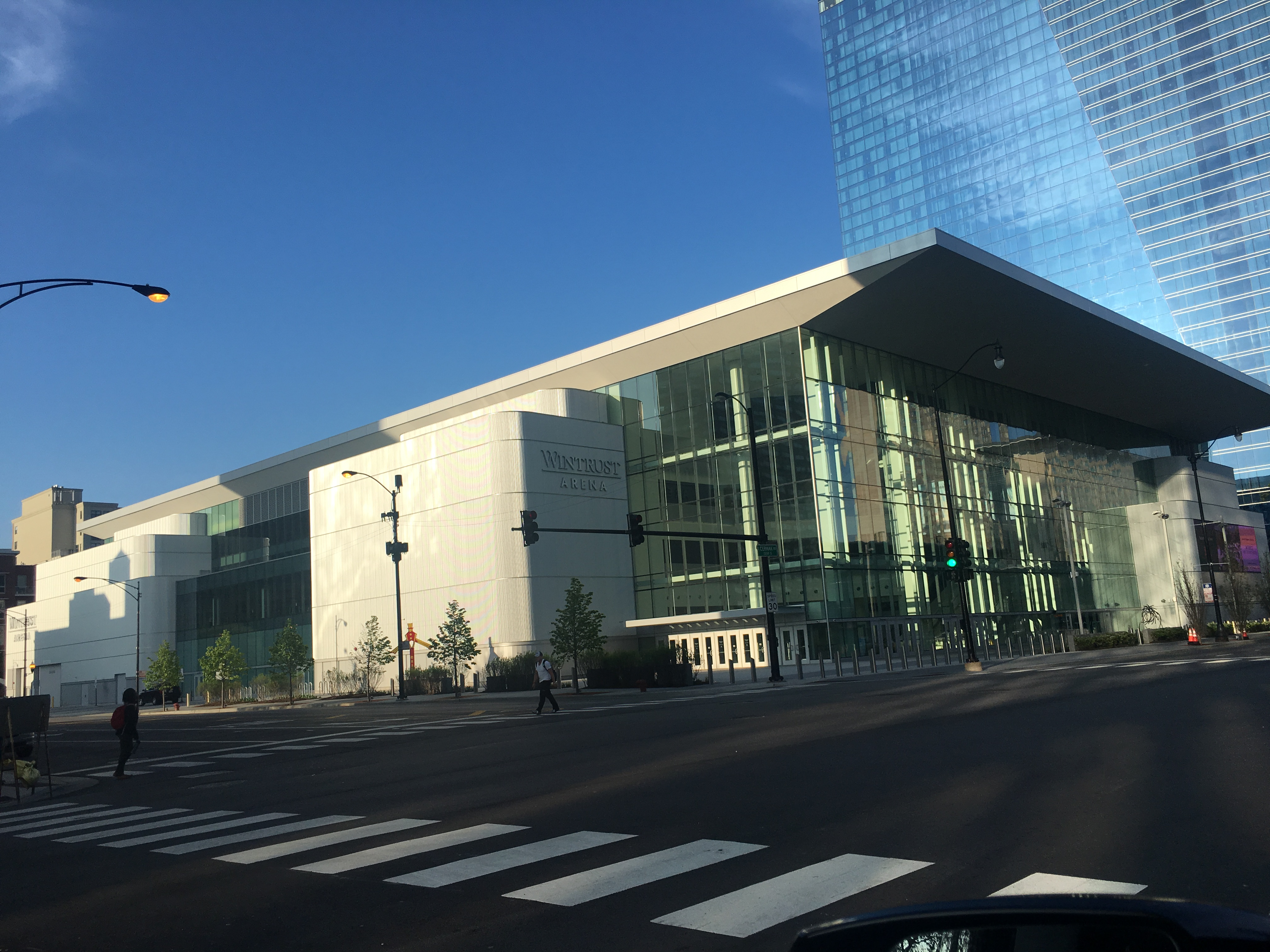
Wintrust Arena

Wintrust Arena is a 10,387-seat multi-purpose sports venue in Chicago. The arena opened in 2017 and is home of the DePaul Blue Demons men's basketball team.

=== Allstate Arena ===
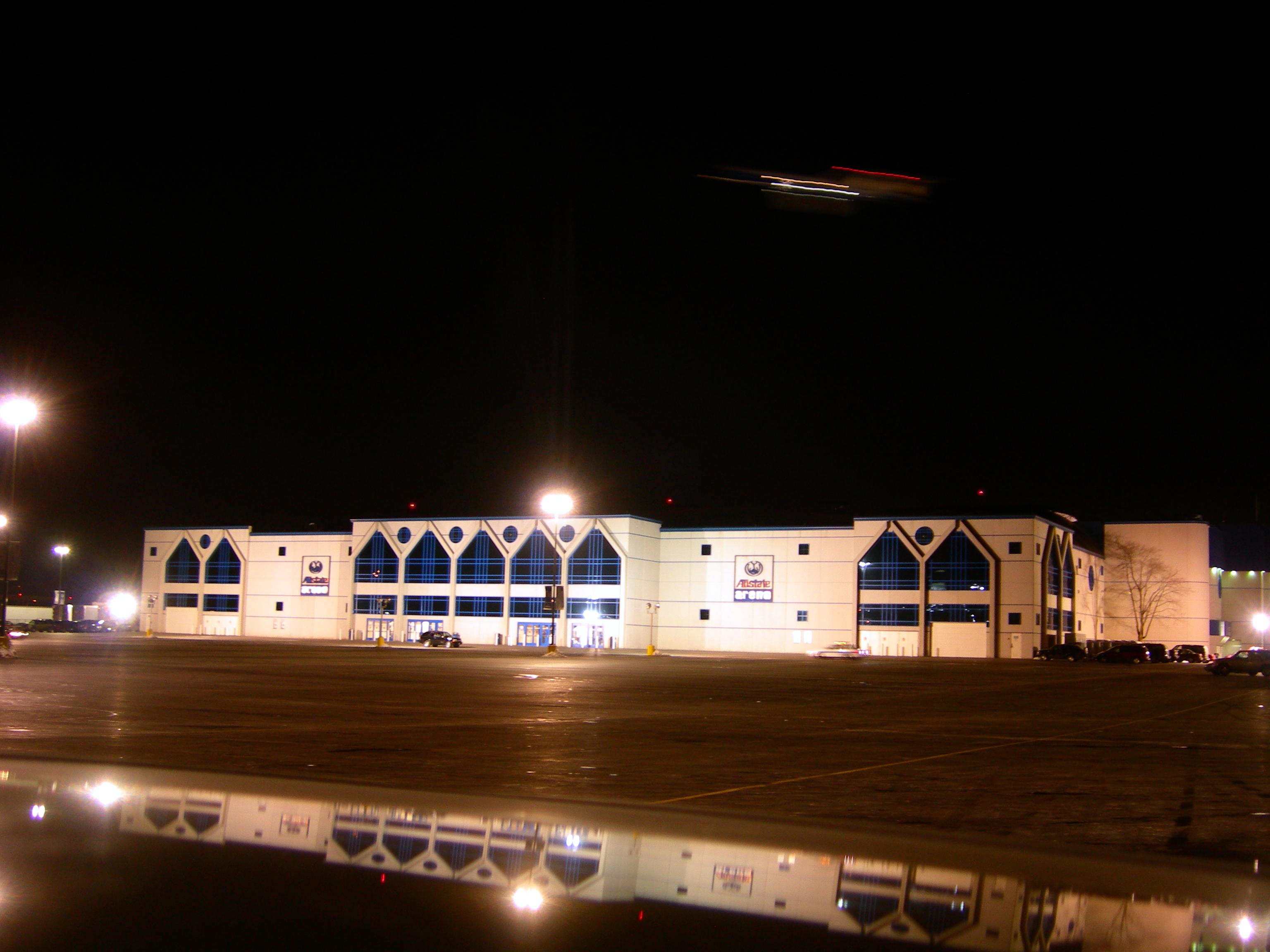
Allstate Arena

Allstate Arena, formerly the Rosemont Horizon, opened in 1980 and was home of the DePaul men's basketball team from its opening until 2017. The arena sat 17,500 people for basketball.

=== Alumni Hall ===
Alumni Hall was completed in 1956 and was the on-campus home venue of the DePaul Blue Demons men's basketball team through 1980 when the Rosemont Horizon opened.

=== University Auditorium ===
University Auditorium, nicknamed "The Barn", was the original on-campus home gymnasium for DePaul men's basketball starting in 1923 until 1956.

=== Alternate arenas ===
McGrath-Phillips Arena, located in the Sullivan Athletic Center, was the home venue for select on-campus games for the men's basketball team from 2000 until 2017. The venue also hosted DePaul men's basketball games during the 2007 National Invitation Tournament and 2019 College Basketball Invitational Tournament.

Chicago Stadium was the home of college basketball doubleheaders involving the DePaul men's basketball team in the 1940s and 1950s.

=== Practice and Training facilities ===
McGrath-Phillips Arena is the practice facility for the DePaul Blue Demons men's basketball team. The facility is located in the Sullivan Athletic Center, which was completed in 2000.

Due to claims that this facility is no longer adequate, a new training facility is being built across the street.
