= Koju Munakata =

Japanese basketball player and coach

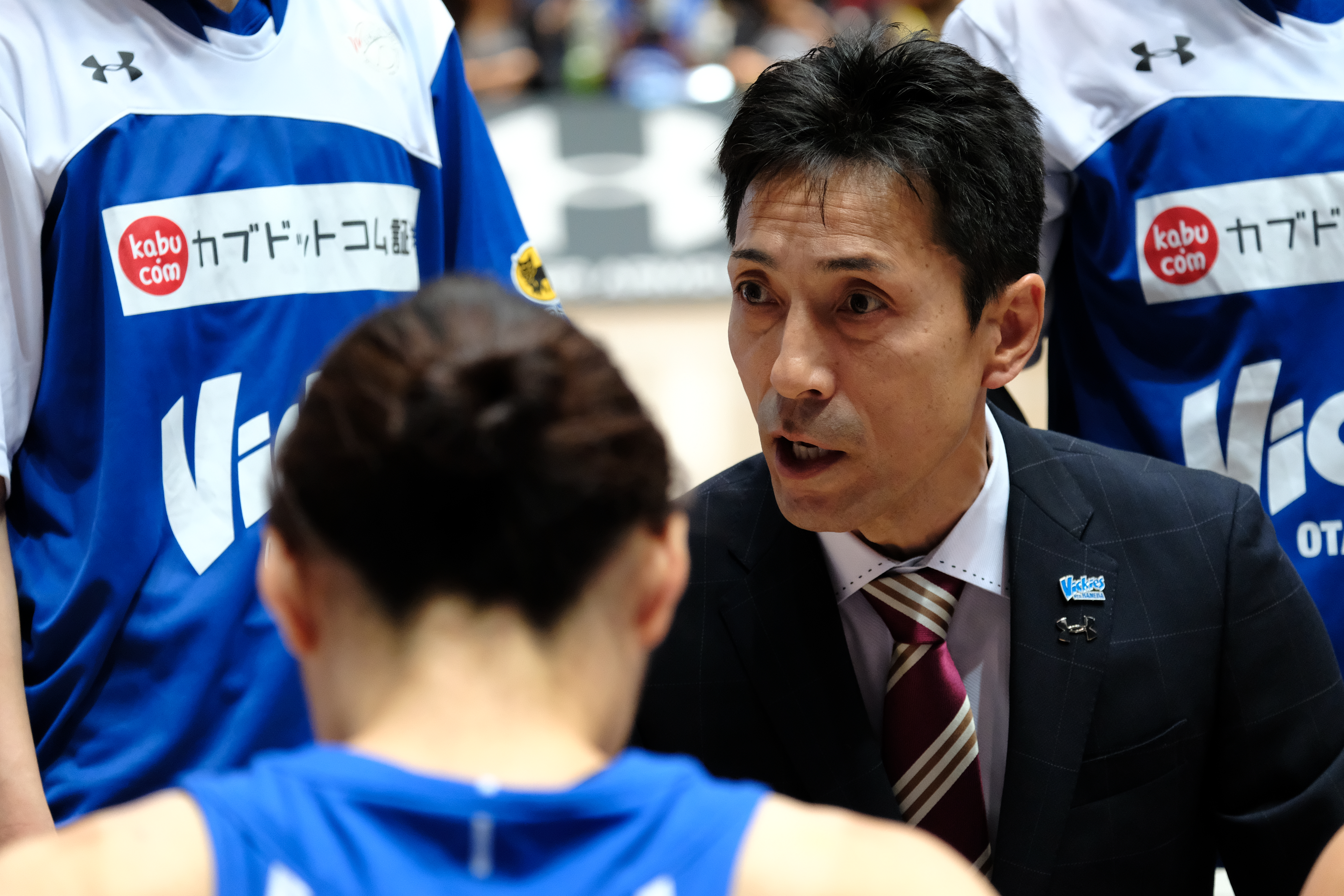

Haneda Vickies
- Position: Head coach
- League: Women's Japan Basketball League

Personal information
- Born: January 10, 1967 (age 59) Tsuruta, Aomori

Career information
- High school: Hirosaki Jitsugyo (Hirosaki, Aomori)
- College: Takushoku University
- Playing career: 1989–2006

Career history

Playing
- 1989-1998: Nippon Mining/Japan Energy
- 1998-2006: Toyota Alvark

Coaching
- 2005-2008: Toyota Alvark (asst)
- 2008-2010: Toyota Alvark
- 2011-2013: Hitachi High-Technologies Cougars
- 2013-2015: Aomori Wat's
- 2015-2016: Shinshu Brave Warriors
- 2016-2017: Yamagata Wyverns
- 2017-present: Haneda Vickies

Career highlights
- 3x JBL Best5; JBL Assist leader

Koju Munakata (棟方 公寿, Munakata Kōju) is the head coach of the Haneda Vickies in the Women's Japan Basketball League.

== Head coaching record ==
Legend
Regular season	G	Games coached	W	Games won	L	Games lost	W–L %	Win–loss %
Playoffs	PG	Playoff games	PW	Playoff wins	PL	Playoff losses	PW–L %	Playoff win–loss %

Team	Year	G	W	L	W–L%	Finish	PG	PW	PL	PW–L%	Result
Toyota Alvark	2008-09	35	18	17	.514	4th	2	0	2	.000	4th
Toyota Alvark	2009-10	42	20	22	.476	6th	-	-	-	–	-
Hitachi High-Technologies Cougars	2011-12	16	12	4	.750	2nd in W1	-	-	-	–	-
Hitachi High-Technologies Cougars	2012-13	22	5	17	.227	10th	-	-	-	–	-
Aomori Wat's	2013-14	52	27	25	.519	6th in Eastern	2	0	2	.000	Lost in 1st round
Aomori Wat's	2014-15	52	23	29	.442	6th in Eastern	4	2	2	.500	Lost in 2nd round
Shinshu Brave Warriors	2015-16	52	27	25	.519	7th in Eastern	2	0	2	.000	Lost in 1st round
Yamagata Wyverns	2016-17	60	26	34	.433	5th in B2 Eastern	-	-	-	–	-
Haneda Vickies	2017-18	33	9	24	.273	10th	-	-	-	–	-
Haneda Vickies	2018-19	22	8	14	.364	8th	-	-	-	–	-
