= Toru Shioya =

Japanese basketball coach and former player

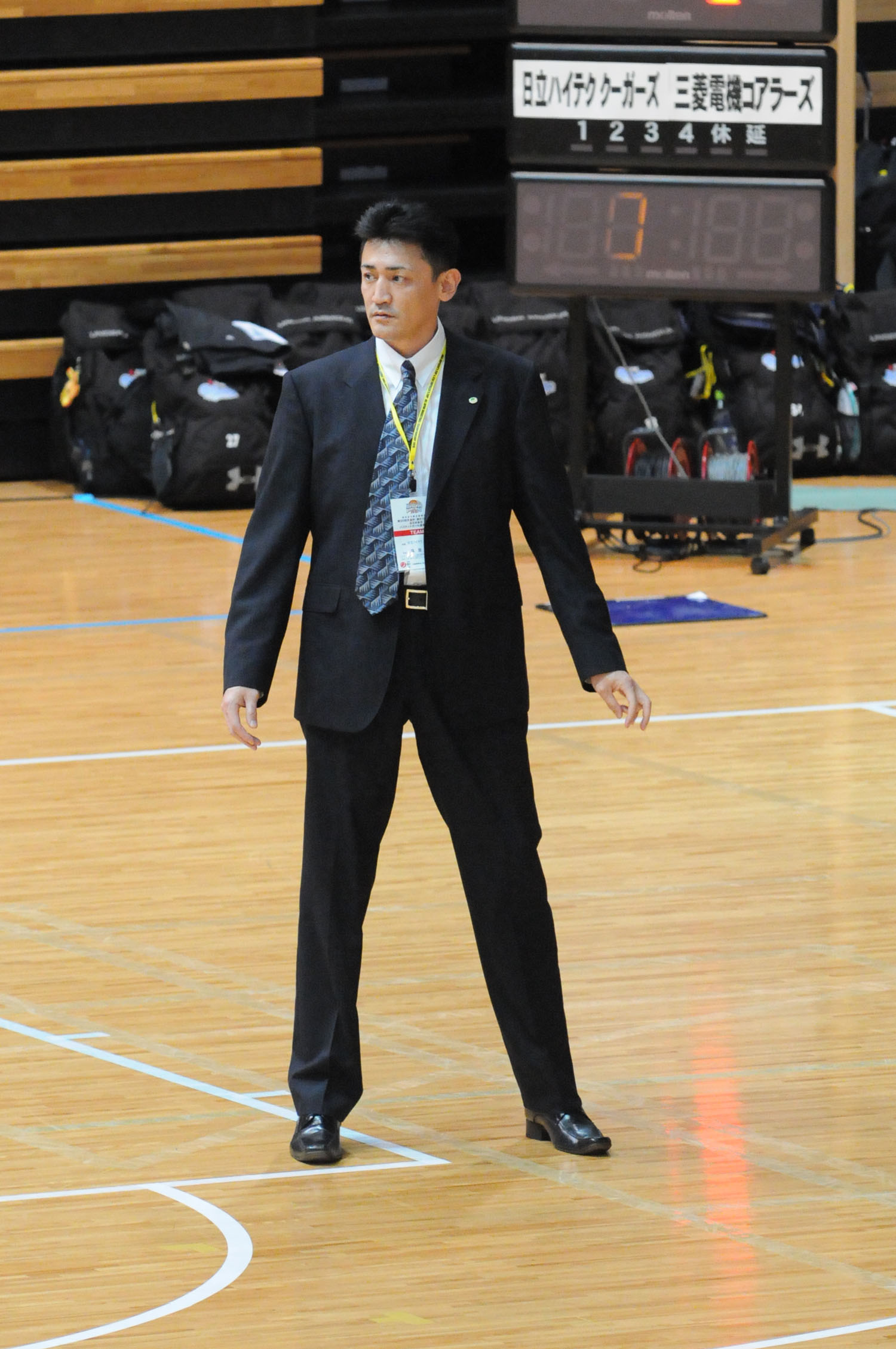
- Shioya in 2015

Personal information
- Born: January 9, 1968 (age 58) Akita, Akita
- Listed height: 6 ft 4 in (1.93 m)
- Listed weight: 198 lb (90 kg)

Career information
- High school: Akita Keizaihoka University High School (Akita, Akita)
- College: Akita Keizaihoka University
- Playing career: 1990–1998
- Position: Coach
- Coaching career: 2010–present

Career history

Playing
- 1990–1998: Isuzu Motors

Coaching
- 2010–2014: Women's National Wheelchair team (asst.)
- 2014–2015: Hitachi High-Technologies Cougars (coach)

Career highlights
- 4x JBL Champions; 3x Emperor's Cup Champions; National Sports Festival of Japan Champions
Medals
Men's basketball
Representing Japan
FIBA Asia Champions Cup
Silver medal – second place	1996 Manila	Isuzu Lynx

Toru Shioya (born January 9, 1968) is a former professional basketball Head coach for the Hitachi High-Technologies Cougars of Women's Japan Basketball League .

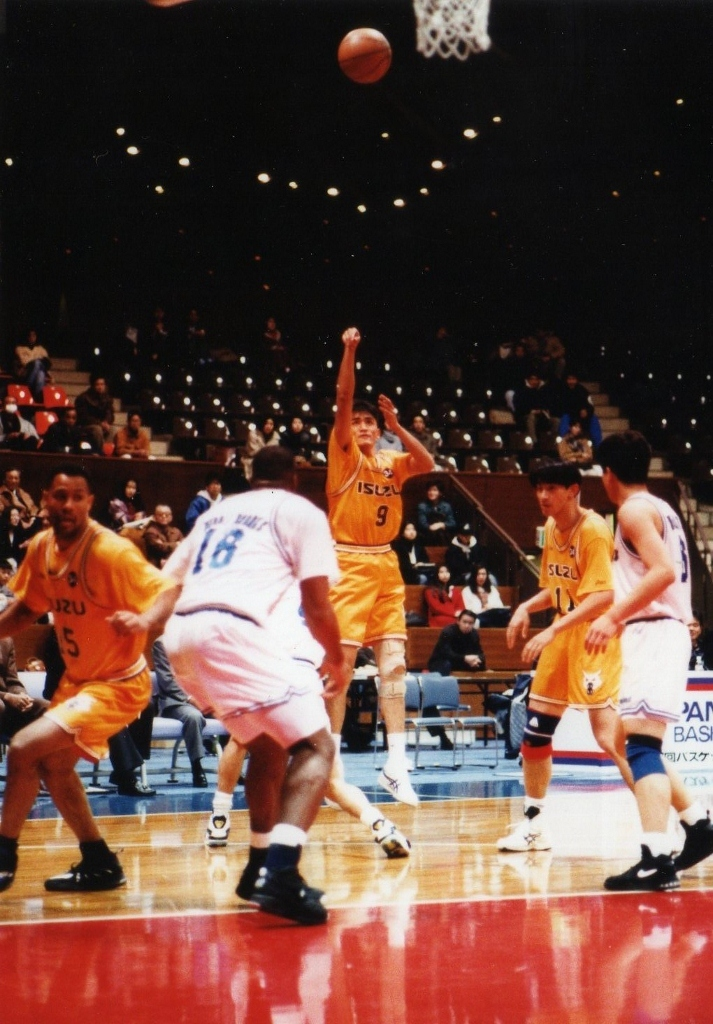
