= Mitsuaki Sato =

Basketball coach

Mitsuaki Sato 佐藤満明
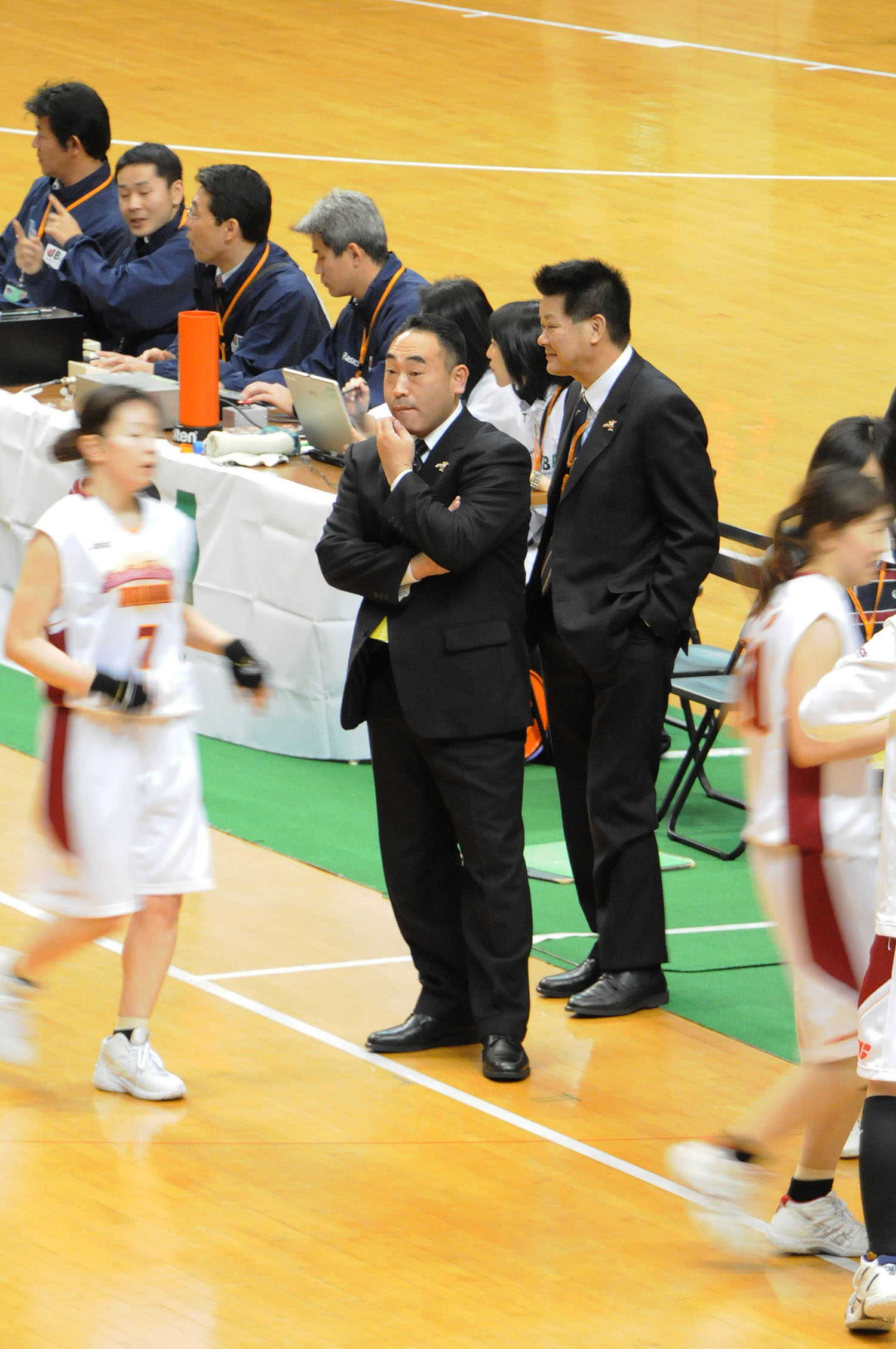
- Sato in 2010

Toyota Boshoku Sunshine Rabbits
- Position: General manager
- League: Women's Japan Basketball League

Personal information
- Born: November 2, 1968 (age 58) Omonogawa, Akita

Career information
- High school: Noshiro Technical (Noshiro, Akita)
- College: Chukyo University
- Coaching career: 1991–present

Career history

Coaching
- 1991-1993: Chukyo University (asst)
- 1994-2012: Toyota Boshoku Sunshine Rabbits

Mitsuaki Sato (佐藤満明, Sato Mitsuaki) is the former Head coach of the Toyota Boshoku Sunshine Rabbits in the Women's Japan Basketball League. He played college basketball for Chukyo University.

== Head coaching record ==
Head coaching record
Team	Year	Games Coached	Games won	Games lost	Win-loss %	Finish
Boshoku	2004-05	12	1	11	.083	5th in W1
Boshoku	2005-06	16	4	12	.250	5th in W1
Boshoku	2006-07	16	2	14	.125	5th in W1
Boshoku	2007-08	16	8	8	.500	2nd in W1
Boshoku	2008-09	16	8	8	.500	2nd in W1
Boshoku	2009-10	16	10	6	.625	3rd in W1
Boshoku	2010-11	16	9	7	.563	2nd in W1
Boshoku	2011-12	16	14	2	.875	1st in W1
