= Akita Bank Red Arrows =

Basketball team

Coordinates: 39°43′24.9″N 140°6′36.2″E

Akita Bank Red Arrows 秋田銀行レッドアローズ
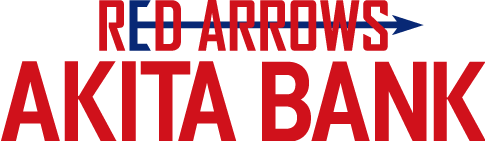
- Leagues: Japan Industrial and Commercial Basketball Federation
- Founded: May 2000
- Arena: Akita Prefectural Gymnasium; CNA Arena Akita
- Location: Akita, Akita, Japan
- Team colors: Red, Navy blue
- Head coach: Michihito Otaki
- Ownership: Akita Bank
- Website: www.akita-bank.co.jp/aboutus/csr/basket/
Home	Away

Akigin Gymnasium
- あきぎん体育館
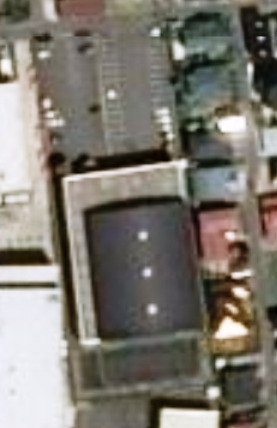

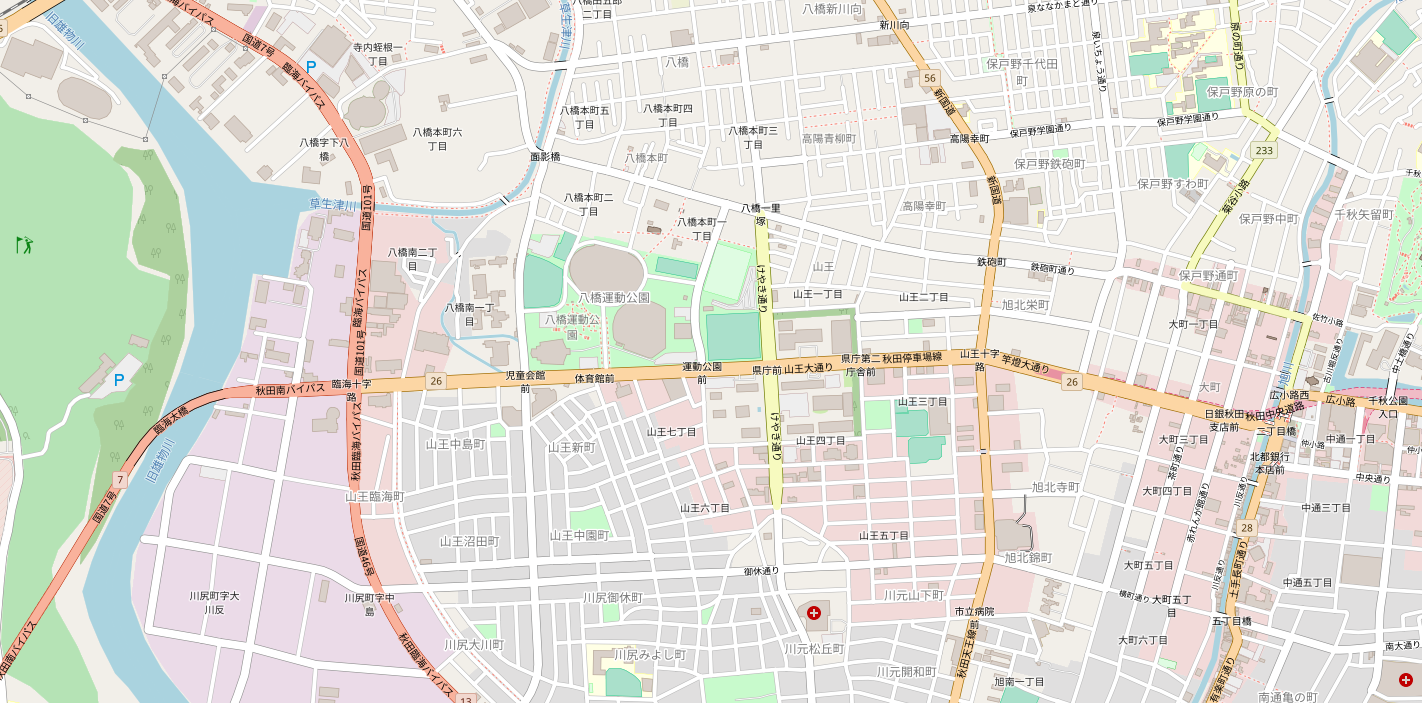
- Location within Akita, Akita Location within Akita Prefecture Location within Japan
- Interactive map of Akigin Gymnasium
- Full name: 秋銀体育館
- Address: 5-24, Hodono Teppomachi, Akita City 010-0913
- Owner: Akita Bank
- Operator: Akita Bank

Tenants
- Akita Bank Red Arrows (practice); Akita Northern Happinets (practice)

Akita Bank Red Arrows is a Japanese women's basketball club based in Akita, Akita, playing in the Japan Industrial and Commercial Basketball Federation. They play their home games at the Akita Prefectural Gymnasium, located on the Yabase Sports Park.

== Coaches ==
- Shigeyoshi Kasahara
- Satoru Furuta
- Takuo Aoki
- Masato Ogasawara
- Michihito Otaki
- Naoko Hattori

== Practice facilities ==
- Akigin Gymnasium

== Honors and titles ==
Japan Industrial and Commercial Basketball Federation Championships

- Champions (10): 2001, 2003, 2005, 2006, 2007, 2008, 2013, 2014, 2017, 2018
- Runners-up (1): 2015

Japan Industrial and Commercial Basketball Federation Competitions

- Champions (3): 2005, 2006, 2007
- Runners-up (5): 2002, 2011, 2012, 2013, 2017

Japan Industrial and Commercial Basketball Federation Regional League Championships

- Champions (2): 2019, 2020

National Sports Festival of Japan

- Champions (4): 2007, 2012, 2014, 2017

== Gallery ==
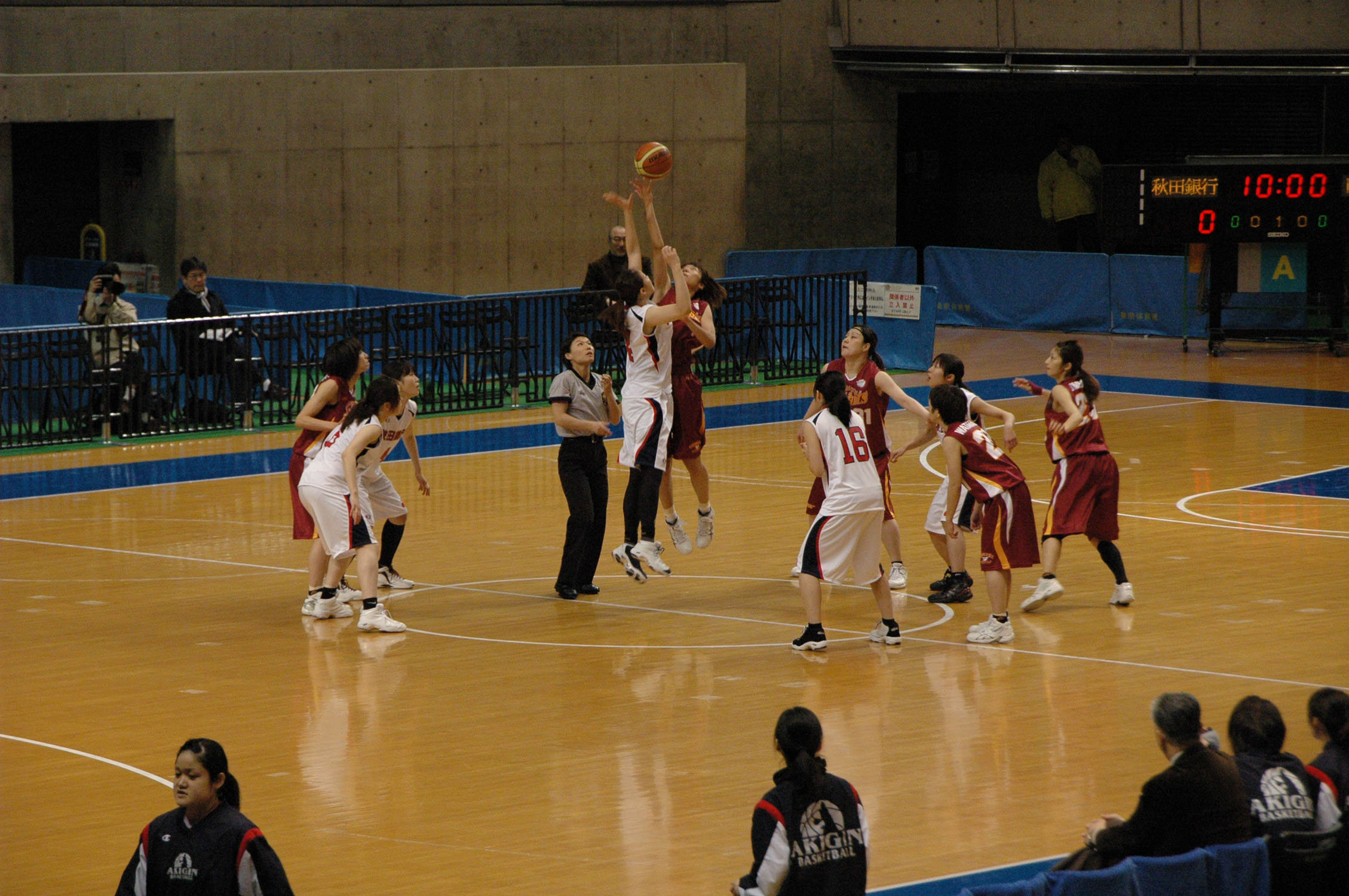

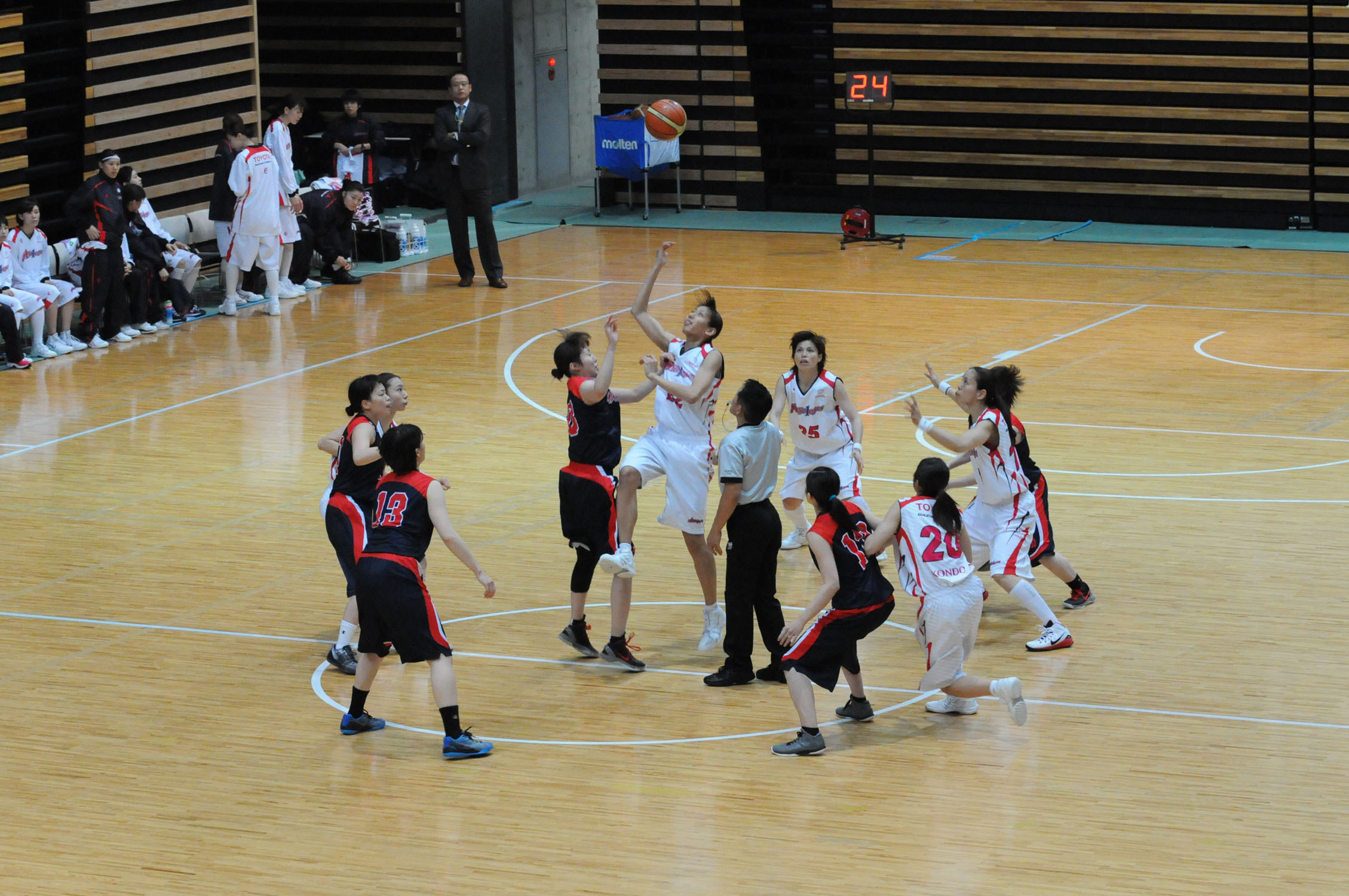

== See also ==
- Prestige International Aranmare Akita

== Location map ==
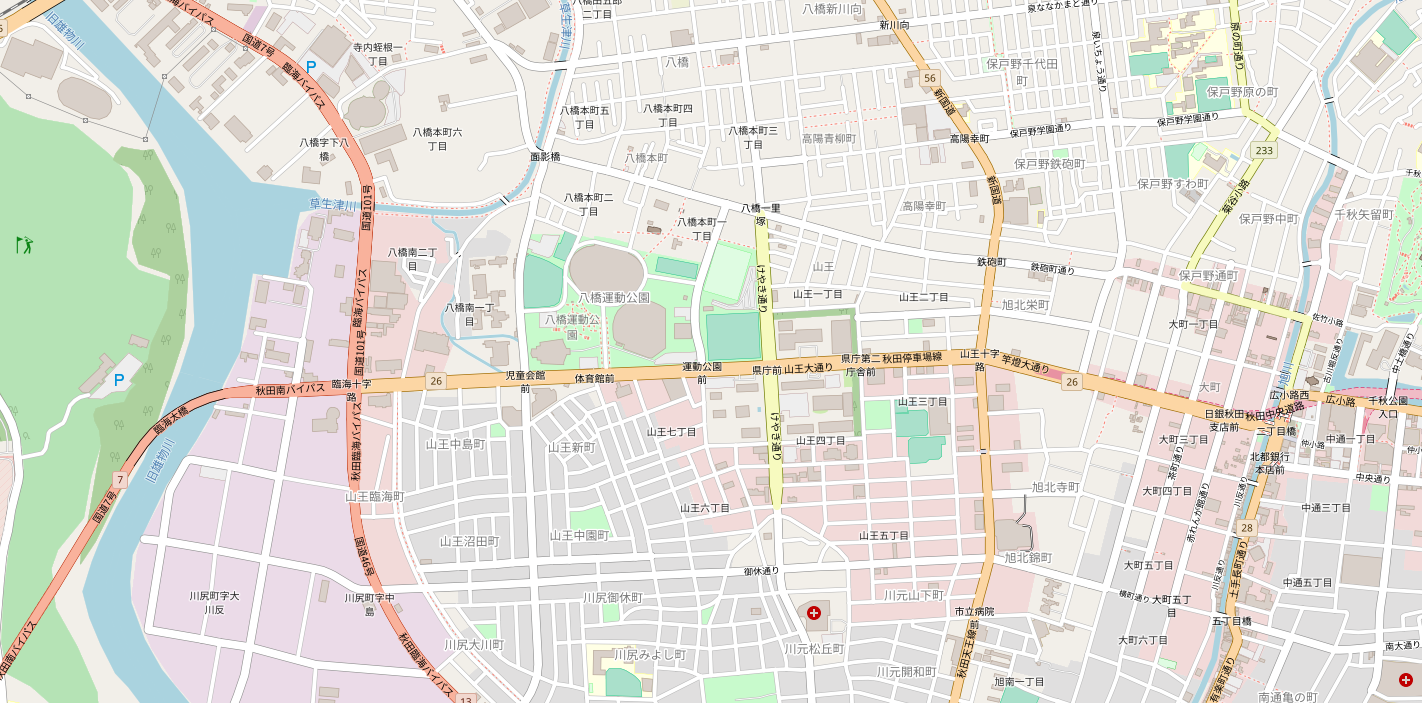
Akigin Gymnasium (Akita, Akita)
