= Yuka Harada =

Japanese basketball player (born 1968)

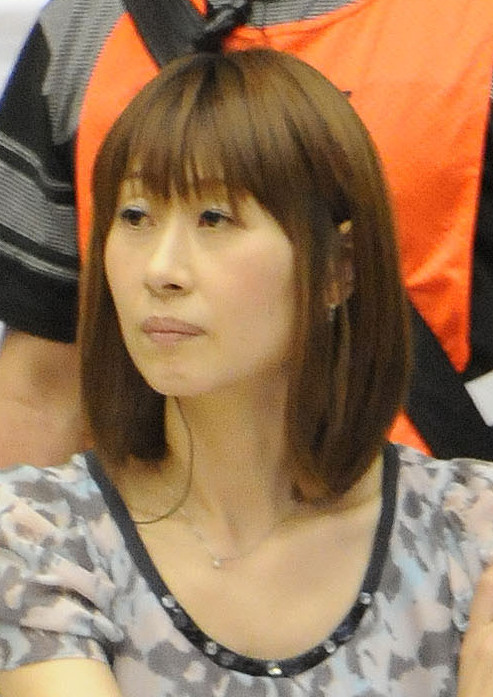
- Yuka Harada in 2010

Personal information
- Nationality: Japanese
- Born: 5 June 1968 (age 58) Shunan, Japan

Sport
- Sport: Basketball

Yuka Harada (原田裕花, Harada Yuka; born 5 June 1968) is a Japanese former professional basketball player and sports commentator who has served as the president of the Women's Japan Basketball League (WJBL) since 2023. She competed in the women's tournament at the 1996 Summer Olympics.
