= Nihon Kogakuin Arena =

Event venue in Tokyo, Japan

Coordinates: 35°33′54″N 139°42′53.8″E

Nihon Kogakuin Arena 日本工学院アリーナ
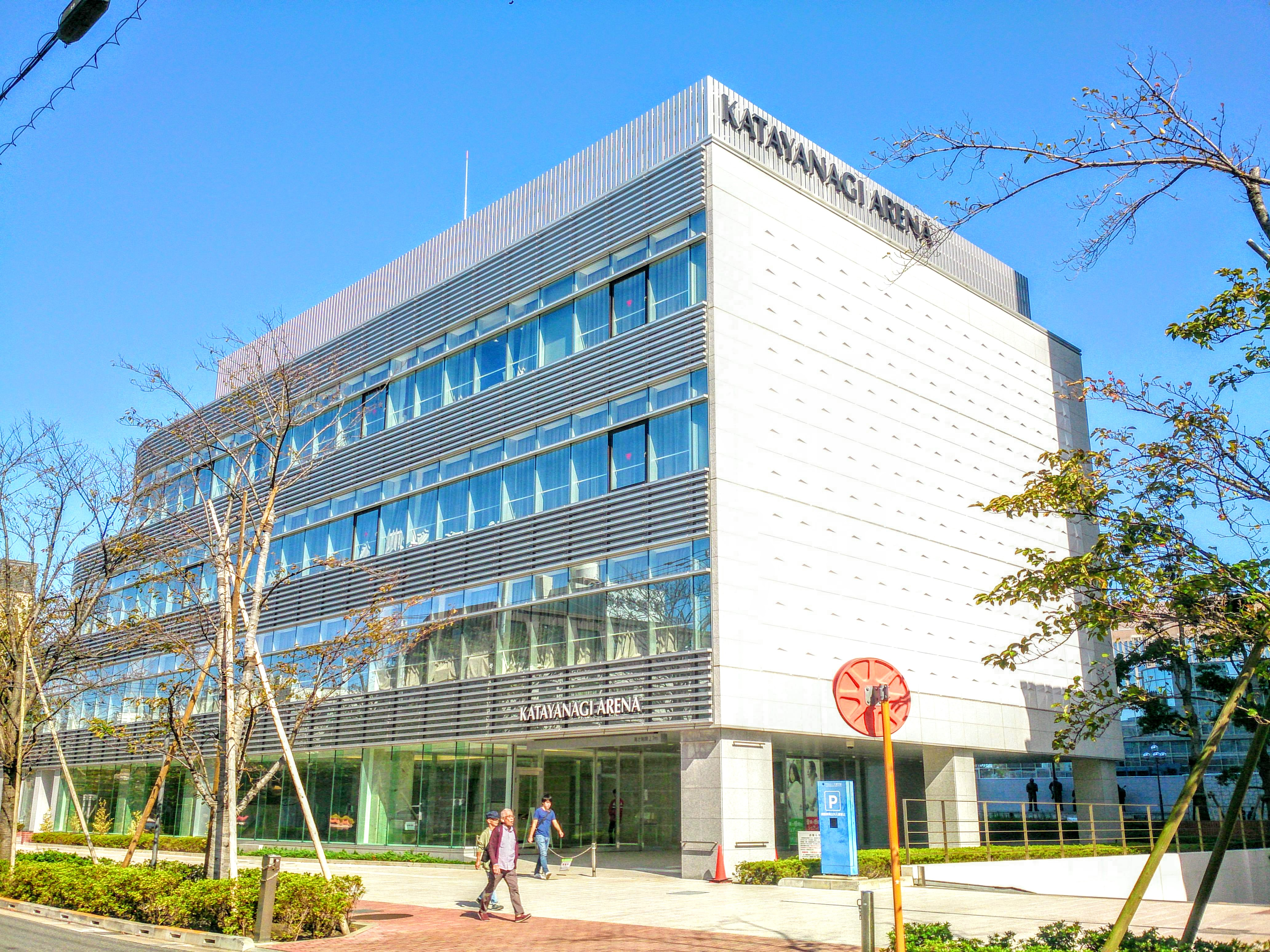
- Interactive map of Nihon Kogakuin Arena 日本工学院アリーナ
- Full name: Nihon Kogakuin Arena
- Former names: Katayanagi Arena 片柳アリーナ
- Location: Ōta, Tokyo, Japan
- Owner: Nihon Kogakuin College
- Operator: Nihon Kogakuin College
- Capacity: 4,000
- Public transit: Japan Railway Kamata Station

Construction
- Opened: October 19, 2016

Tenants
- Earthfriends Tokyo Z B.League playoff B.League U15 Championship; Nippon TV

Website
- Official Website

Nihon Kogakuin Arena is an event venue in Tokyo, Japan. It is located in the basement of building number 2 of the Nihon Kogakuin College. It is used not only by the college but also for public events including basketball matches, concerts and TV programs. Basketball team Earthfriends Tokyo Z of Japans's B.League plays games there. Amongst the television programs recorded in the arena are the National High School Quiz Championship and NTV's entertainment shows Kasou Taishou and Singing King (ja).

It was renamed from Katayanagi Arena on April 1, 2024.

== Facilities ==
- Main arena - 2,800 m^{2}

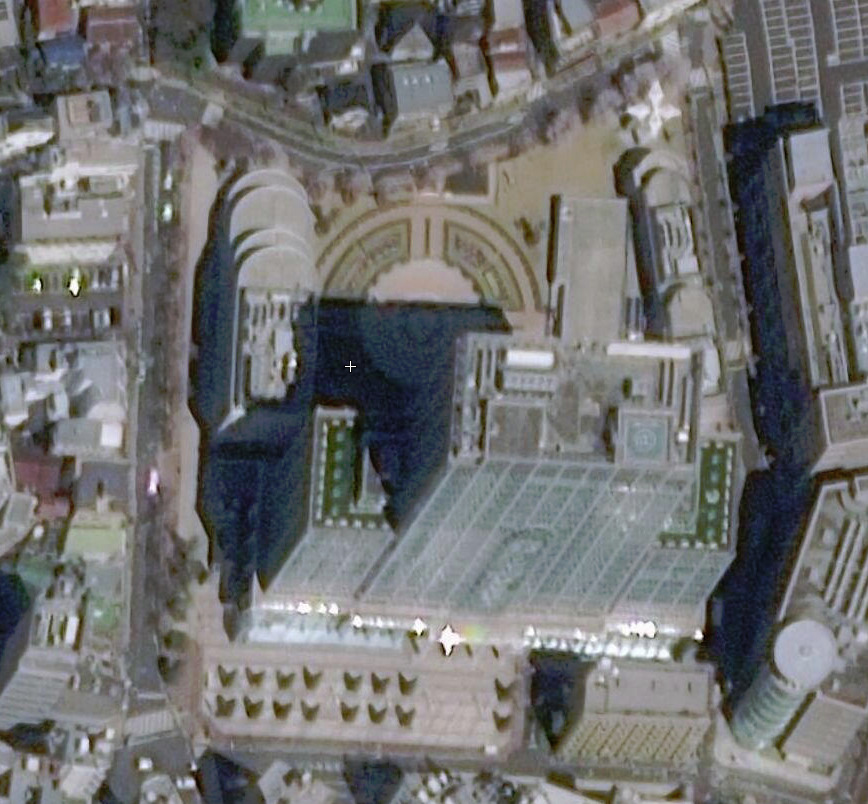
Satellite view
