= Ričmonds Vilde =

Latvian basketball player

Personal information
- Born: July 5, 1990 (age 36) Rīga, Latvia
- Listed height: 2.11 m (6 ft 11 in)
- Listed weight: 130 kg (287 lb)

Career information
- High school: Lee Academy (Lee, Maine)
- College: SMU (2010–2012); Houston Baptist (2013–2015)
- NBA draft: 2015: undrafted
- Playing career: 2015–2018
- Position: Center / power forward
- Number: 55

Career history
- 2015–2016: VEF Rīga
- 2016–2017: ALM Évreux Basket
- 2017–2018: Earthfriends Tokyo Z

Ričmonds Vilde (born July 5, 1990) is a Latvian retired professional basketball player, who played the center/power forward position. Currently, he owns multiple successful businesses in the United States.

He has previously represented Latvia in the U16, U18 and U20 European Championships. After high school Ricmonds Vilde moved to United States and joined SMU to play at NCAA level. During his red shirt year, Vilde started to practice American football and was offered a place in an American football team. Vilde decided to stay with basketball.

In the summer of 2015 for the first time in his career Vilde was included in the Latvian National team's candidate list. However, he was one of the last players who did not make the team for EuroBasket 2015. Later he signed his first pro contract with Latvian champions VEF Rīga.

Ricmonds Vilde's father is a famous Latvian volleyball player Raimonds Vilde who now is the head coach of Latvian Men's Volleyball National Team.
