= Hitachi High-Tech Cougars =

Japanese women's basketball team

Hitachi High-Tech Cougars 日立ハイテク クーガーズ
- League: Women's Japan Basketball League
- Founded: 1961
- Arena: Hitachinaka General Gymnasium
- Capacity: 2,536
- Location: Hitachinaka, Ibaraki
- Ownership: Hitachi High-Tech Corporation
- Website: cougars.hitachi-hightech.com
Home	Away

The Hitachi High-Tech Cougars (Japanese: 日立ハイテク クーガーズ; formerly the Hitachi High-Technologies Cougars) are a professional basketball club based in Hitachinaka, Ibaraki, playing in the Women's Japan Basketball League. From 2024 they play in the upper “W-League Premier”, after the women's league is split into two divisions.

== Notable players ==
- Reika Takahashi
- Kumiko Yamada

== Coaches ==
- Koju Munakata
- Toru Shioya
- Natsumi Yabuuchi
- Tomohide Utsumi
- Sachiko Ishikawa (asst)

== Venues ==
- Hitachinaka General Gymnasium
- Kamisu Bosai Arena
