= North Asia University =

Coordinates: 39°42′59.9″N 140°9′27.2″E

- ノースアジア大学
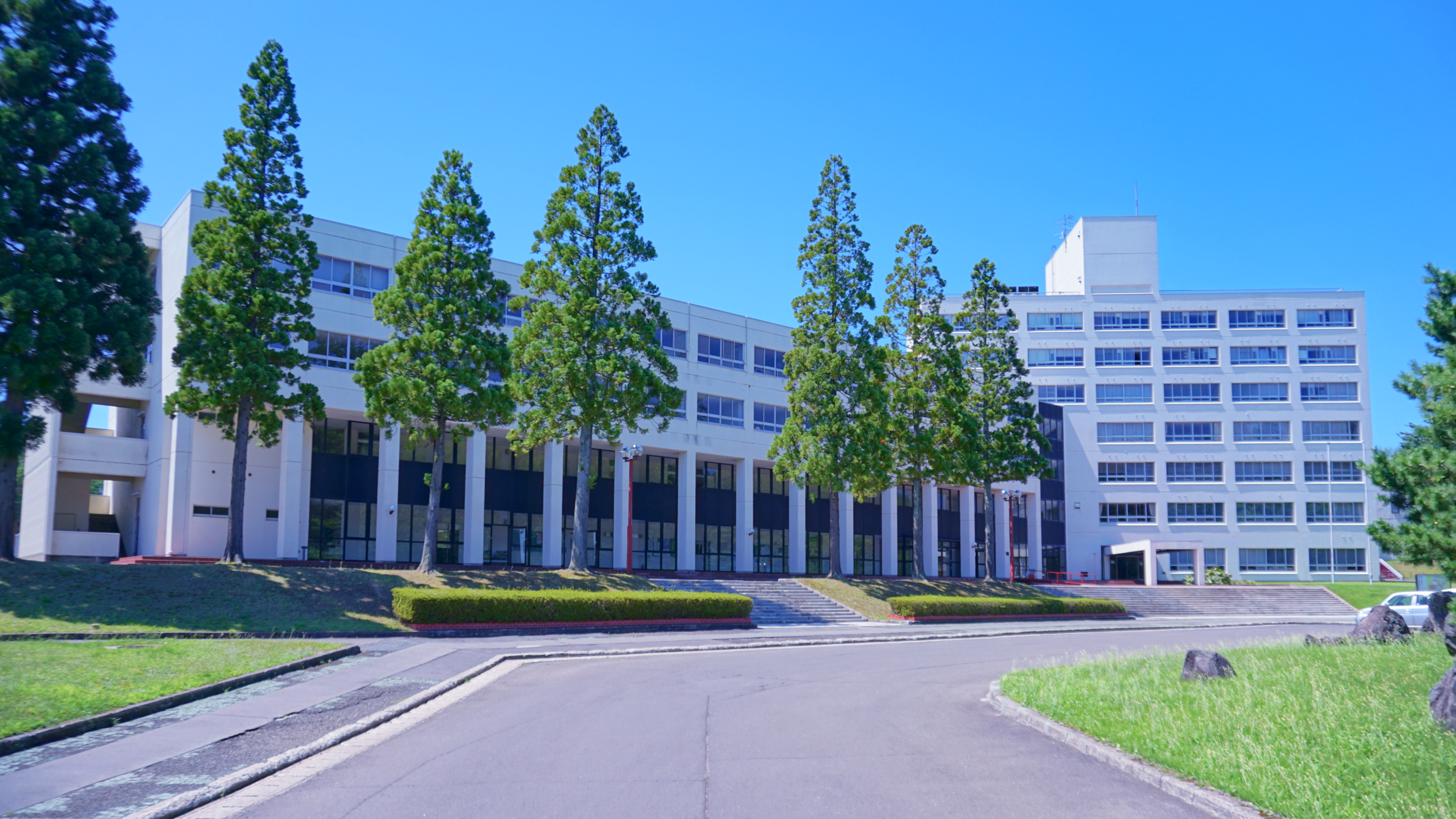
- Type: Private
- Established: 1999
- Location: Akita, Akita Prefecture, Japan
- Website: http://www.nau.ac.jp/

North Asia University (ノースアジア大学, Nōsu ajia daigaku) is a private university located in the city of Akita, Japan.

== History ==
The school opened as Akita University of Economics in 1964. It changed its name to Akita University of Economics and Law in 1983. The present name was adopted in 2007.

== Organization ==
- Department of Economics
- School of Law
  - Law Department
    - Police officers, civil servants course
    - Clerical law course
    - Enterprise management course
    - Journalism course
- Department of Tourism

== Notable alumni ==
- Yuta Kobayashi - basketball player
- Seiichi Oba – basketball manager
- Keiji Oyama- baseball player
- Toru Shioya – basketball coach
