= Toyota Boshoku Sunshine Rabbits =

Basketball team in Kariya, Aichi, Japan

Toyota Boshoku Sunshine Rabbits トヨタ紡織サンシャインラビッツ
- League: Women's Japan Basketball League
- Founded: 1980
- Arena: Wing Arena Kariya
- Capacity: 2,376
- Location: Kariya, Aichi
- General manager: Mitsuaki Sato
- Ownership: Toyota Boshoku
- Website: tb-athlete.jp/basket/index.html
Home	Away

The Toyota Boshoku Sunshine Rabbits (トヨタ紡織サンシャインラビッツ, Toyota Bōshoku Sanshainrabittsu) are a Japanese professional basketball team based in Kariya, Aichi. The Sunshine Rabbits compete in the "Premier" first division of the Women's Japan Basketball League (WJBL). The team plays its home games at Wing Arena Kariya.

== Notable players ==
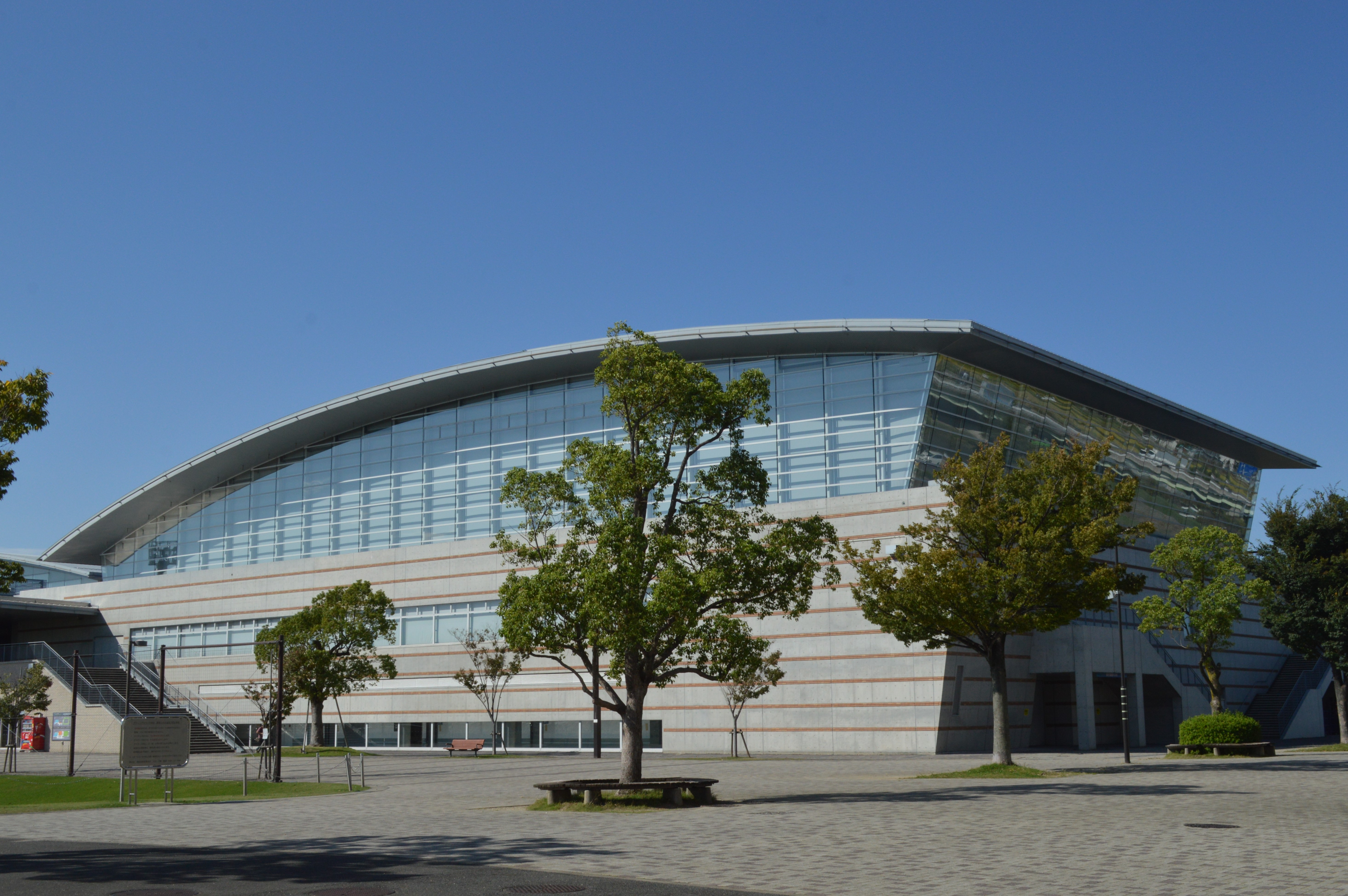
Wing Arena Kariya

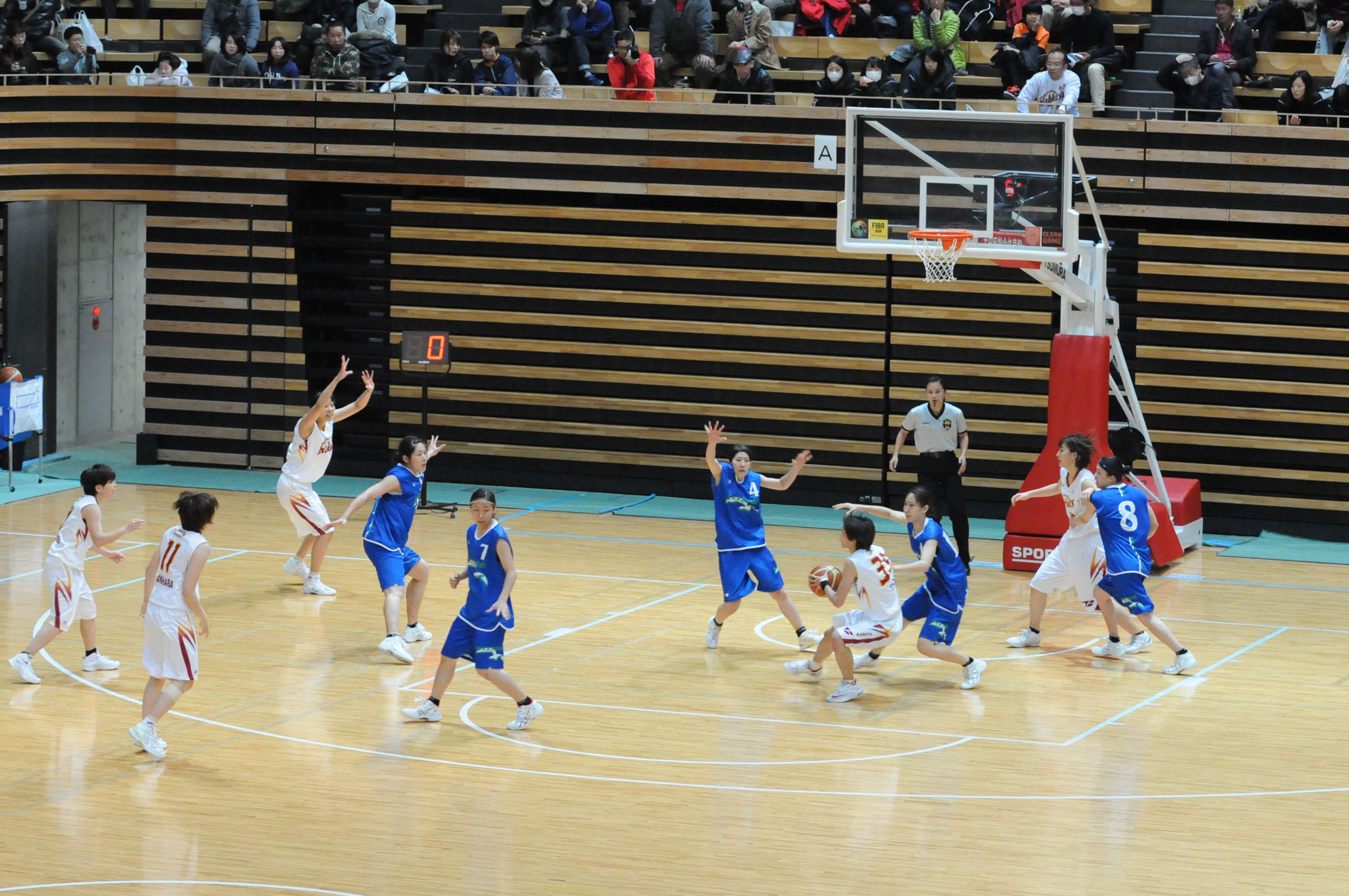

== Coaches ==
- Mitsuaki Sato
