= Taku Saito =

Japanese basketball coach

Ehime Orange Vikings
- Position: Assistant coach
- League: B.League

Personal information
- Born: January 1, 1979 (age 47) Setagaya, Tokyo

Career information
- High school: Komaba (Meguro, Tokyo)
- College: Tokai University
- Coaching career: 2013–present

Career history

Playing
- xxxx-xxxx: Yokohama Giga Cats

Coaching
- 2013-2017: Earthfriends Tokyo Z (asst)
- 2017-2018: Earthfriends Tokyo Z
- 2021-2023: Levanga Hokkaido (asst)
- 2023-present: Ehime Orange Vikings (asst)

Taku Saito (斎藤 卓, Saitō Taku) is the former head coach of the Earthfriends Tokyo Z in the Japanese B.League.

== Head coaching record ==
Legend
Regular season	G	Games coached	W	Games won	L	Games lost	W–L %	Win–loss %
Playoffs	PG	Playoff games	PW	Playoff wins	PL	Playoff losses	PW–L %	Playoff win–loss %

Team	Year	G	W	L	W–L%	Finish	PG	PW	PL	PW–L%	Result
Earthfriends Tokyo Z	2017-18	60	20	40	.333	6th in B2 Central	-	-	-	–	-
