= Wing Arena Kariya =

Arena in Kariya, Japan

Coordinates: 35°1′10.47″N 137°0′37.56″E

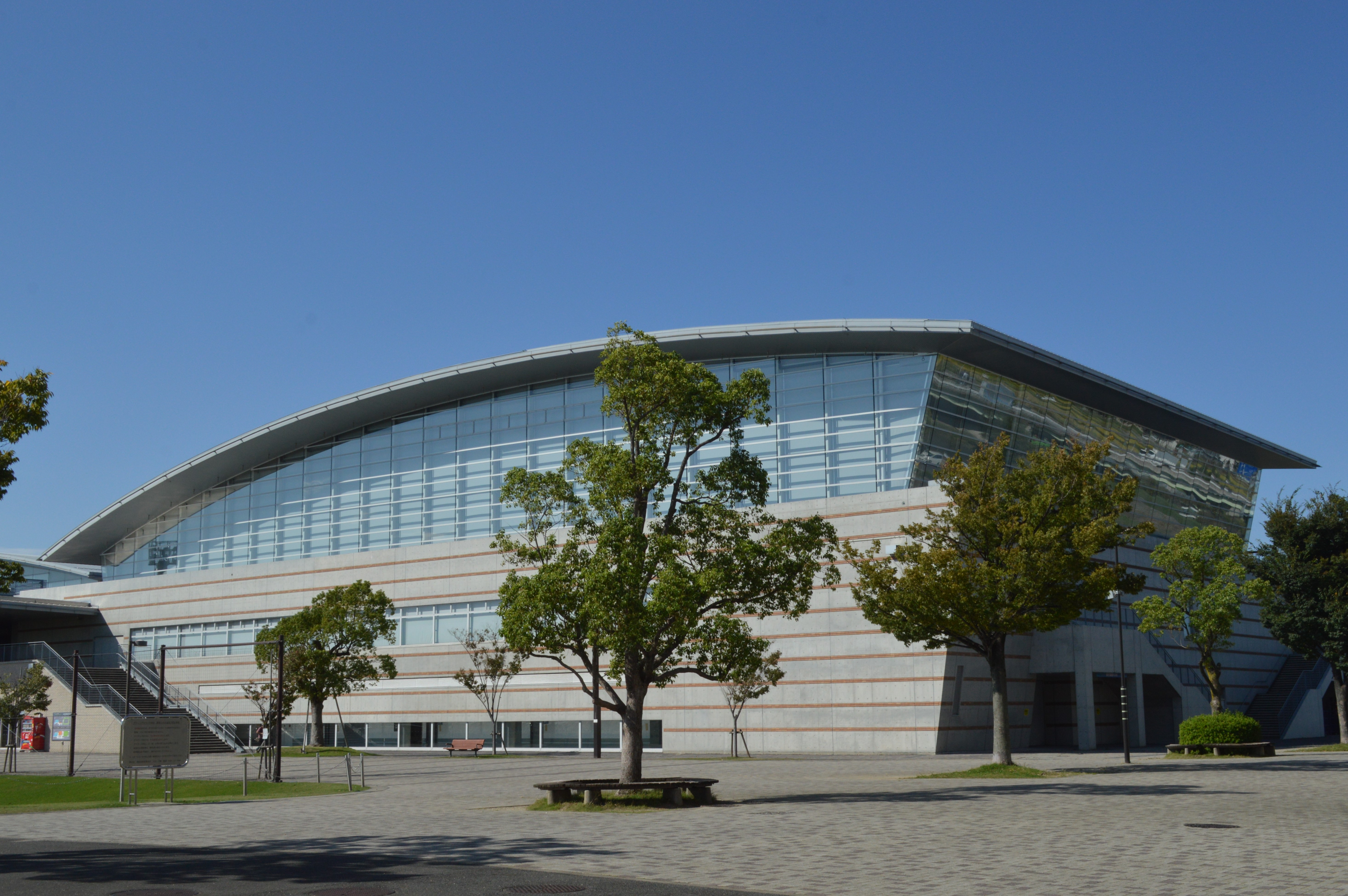
- Interactive map of Wing Arena Kariya
- Full name: Wing Arena Kariya
- Location: Kariya, Aichi, Japan
- Owner: Kariya city
- Operator: Konami Sports Club Co., Ltd.
- Scoreboard: Diamond Vision LED centerhung scoreboard

Construction
- Opened: January, 2007
- Cost

Tenants
- SeaHorses Mikawa (Men's Bascketball); Denso Iris (Women's Bascketball); Toyota Boshoku Sunshine Rabbits (Women's Bascketball)

Website
- http://www.wing-kariya.jp/about/wing.html

Wing Arena Kariya is an arena in Kariya, Aichi, Japan. It is located in Kariya City General Athletic Park.

== Description ==
It was built in January, 2007. It has 2,376 seats (1,576 fixed, 800 temporary).

It is the home arena of the SeaHorses Mikawa of the B.League, Japan's professional basketball league. It is the home arena of the Denso Iris and Toyota Boshoku Sunshine Rabbits of the Women's Japan Basketball League.

== Gallery ==
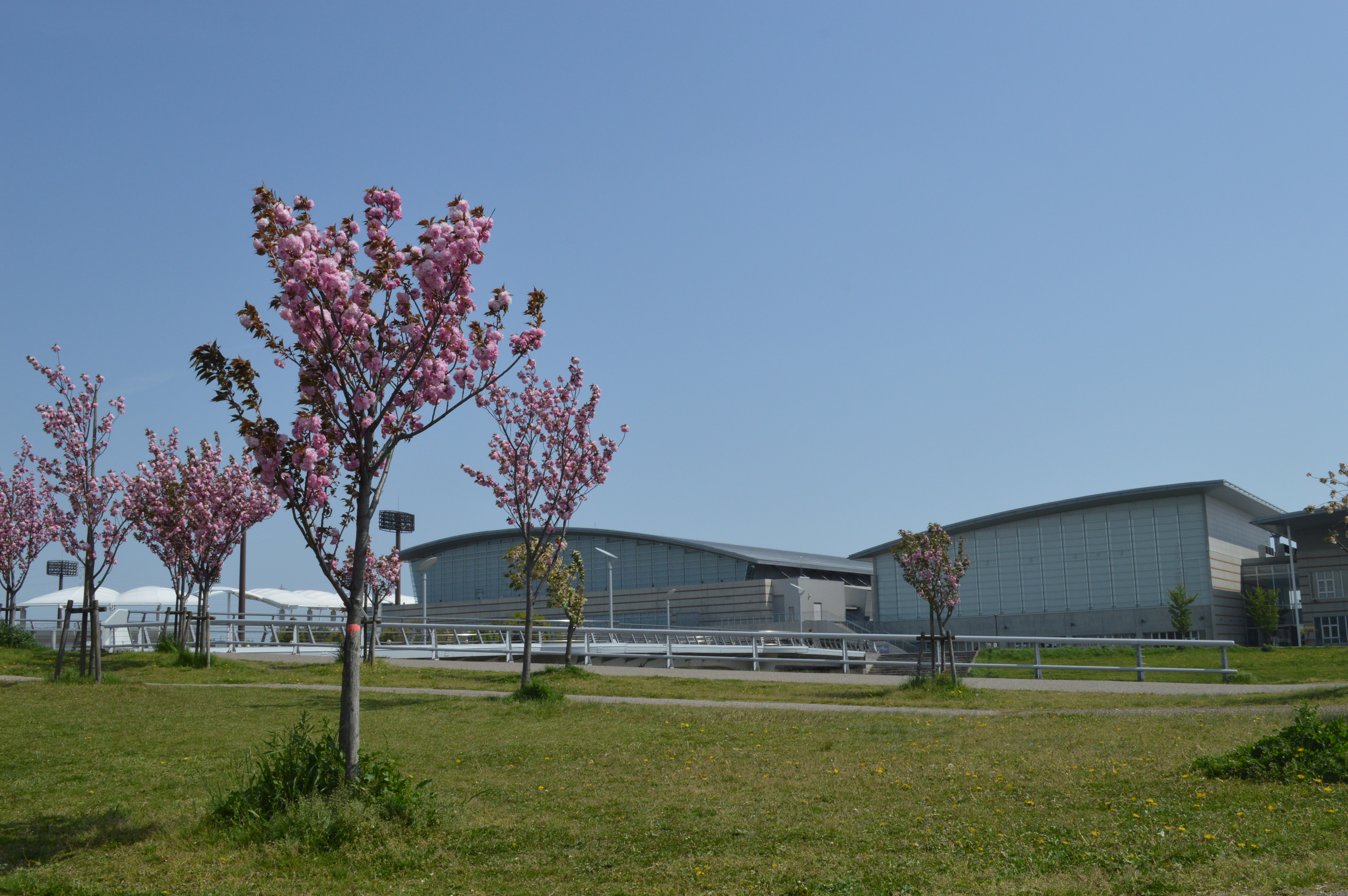

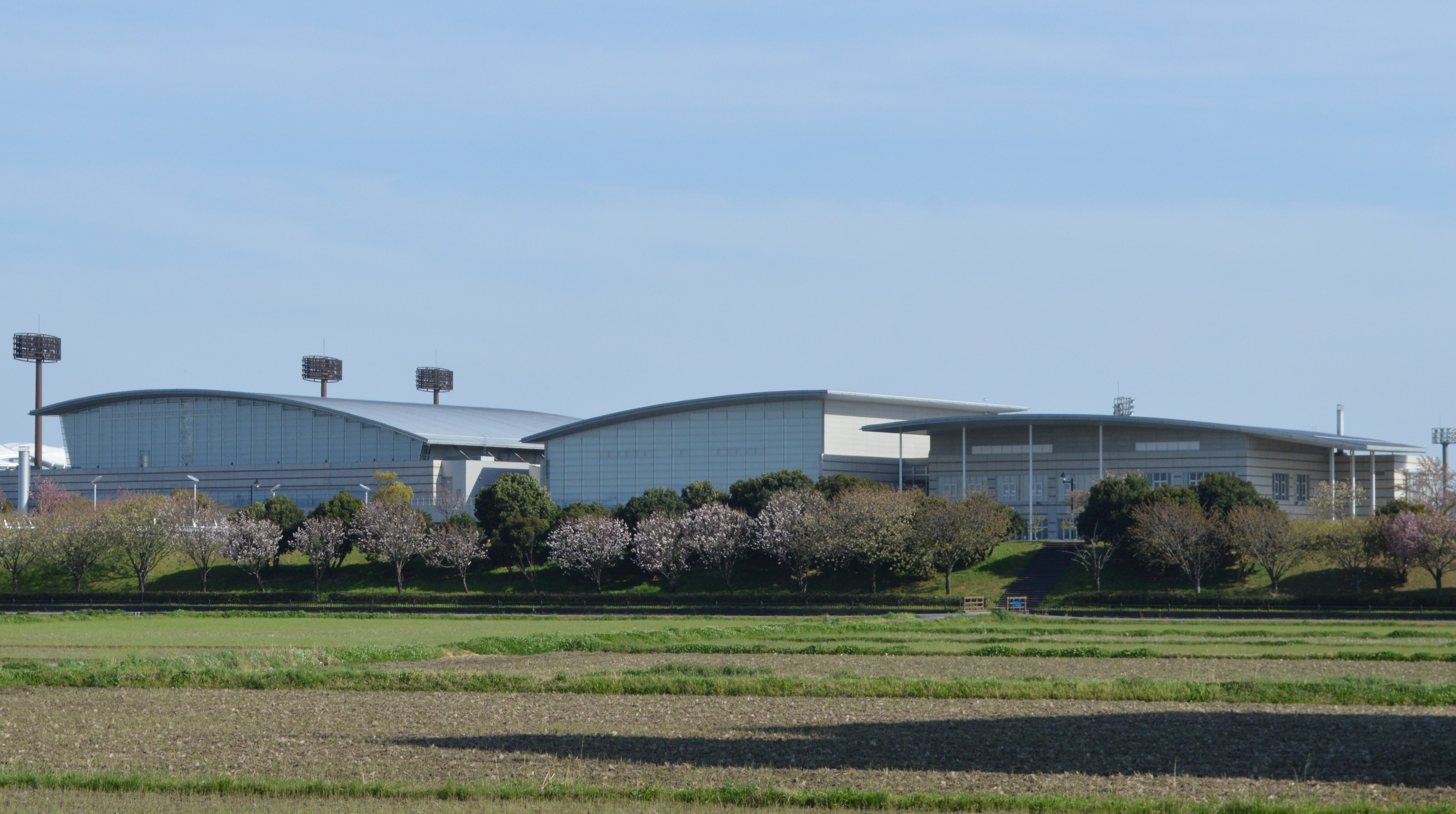

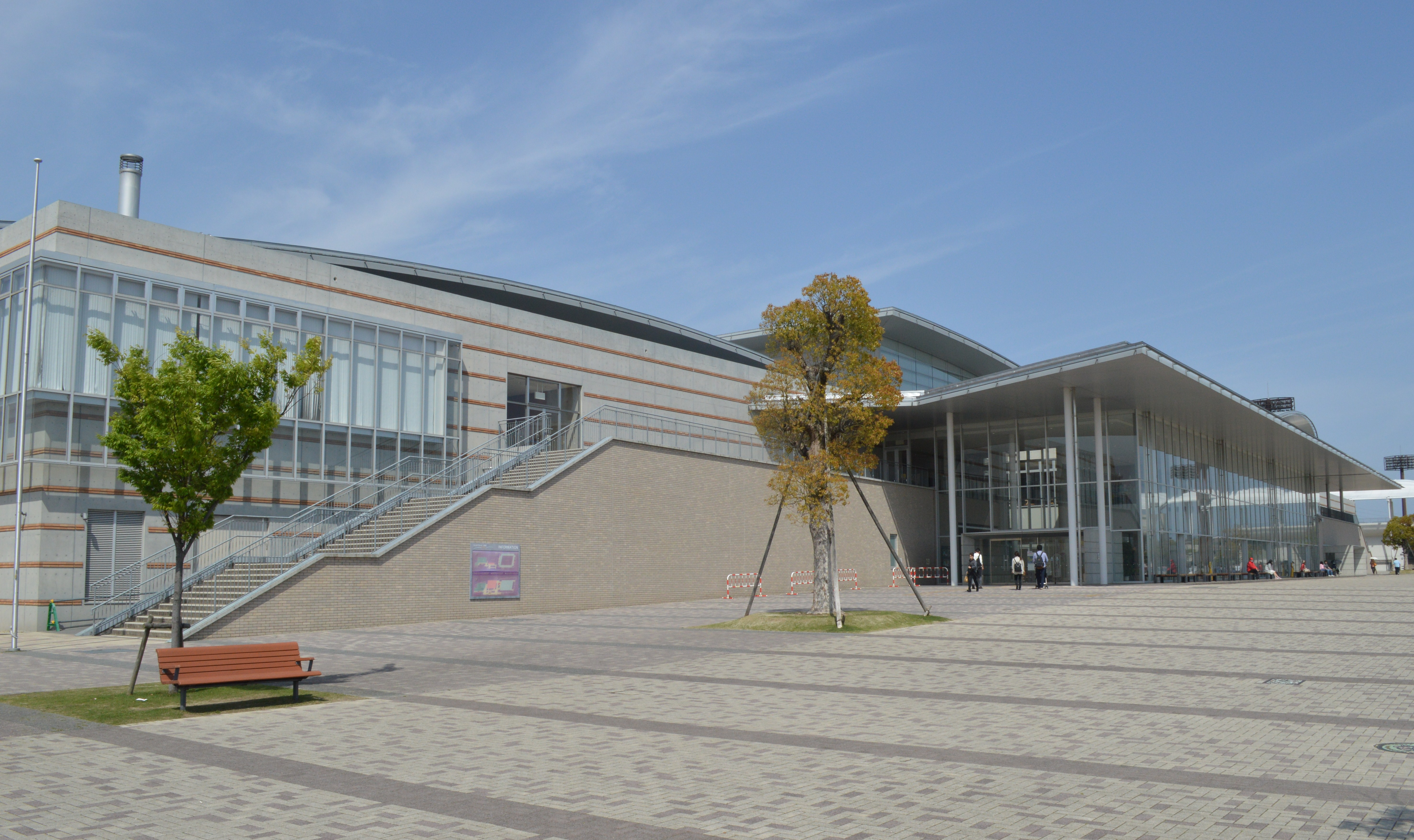

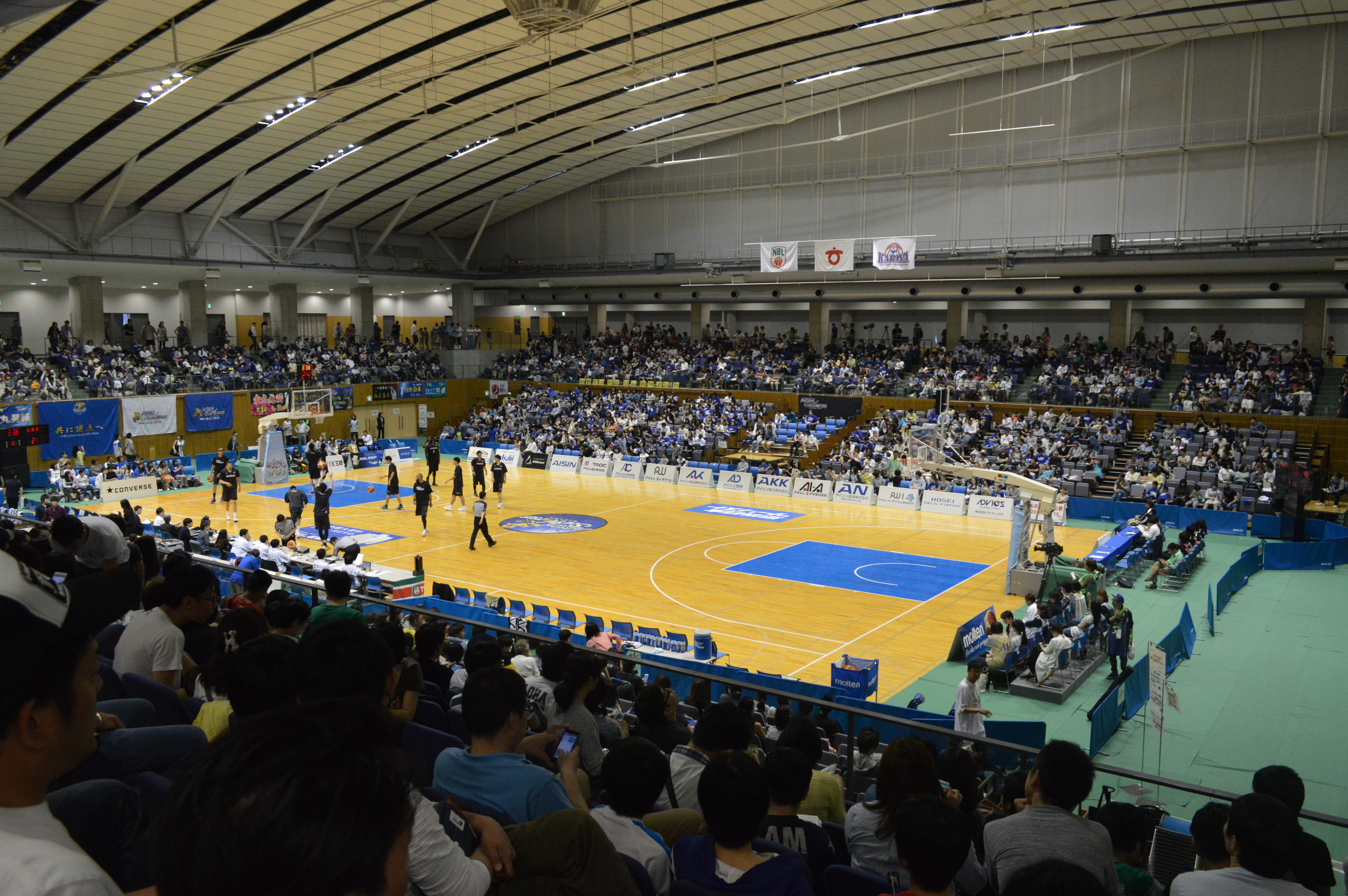

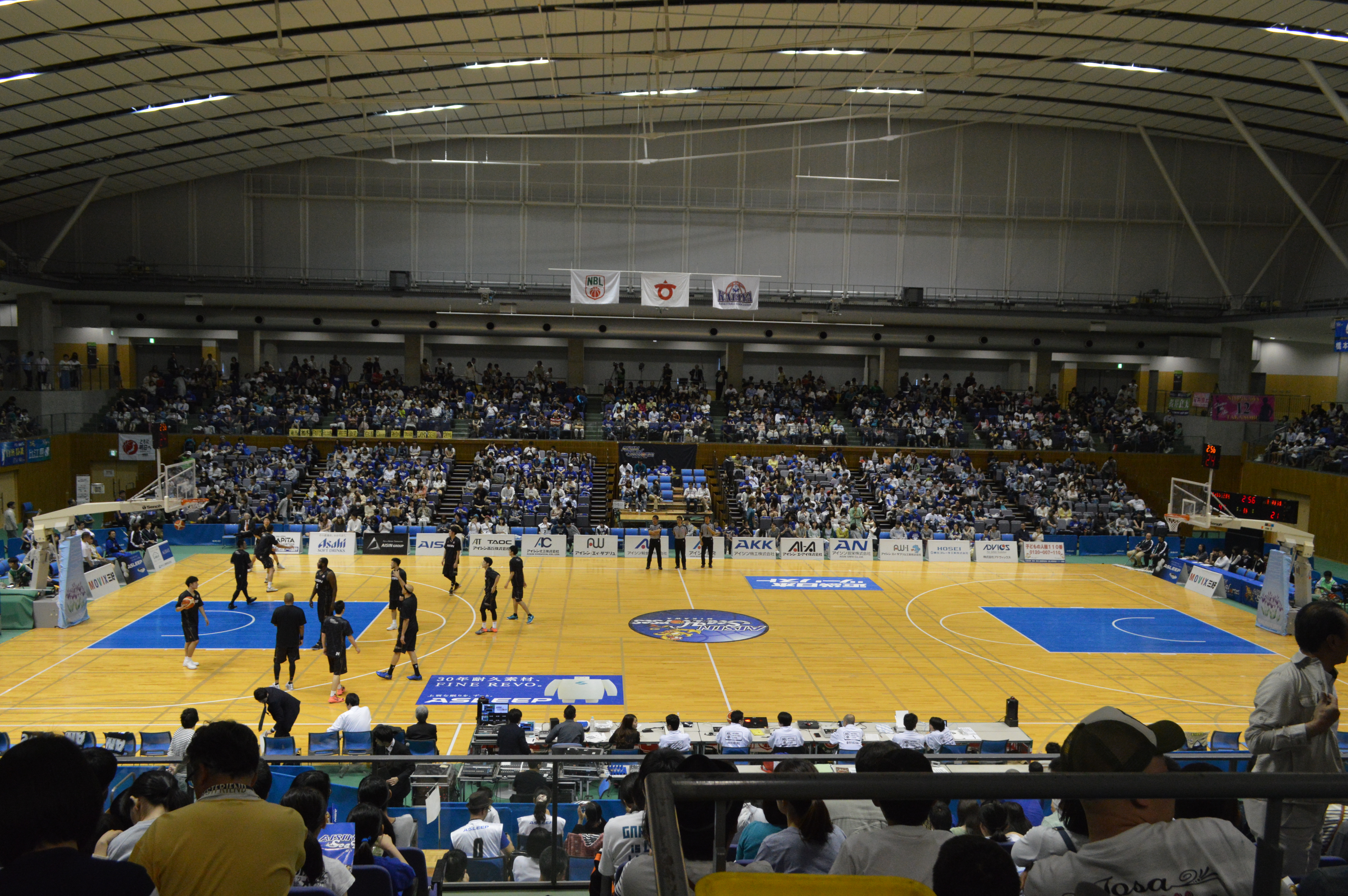

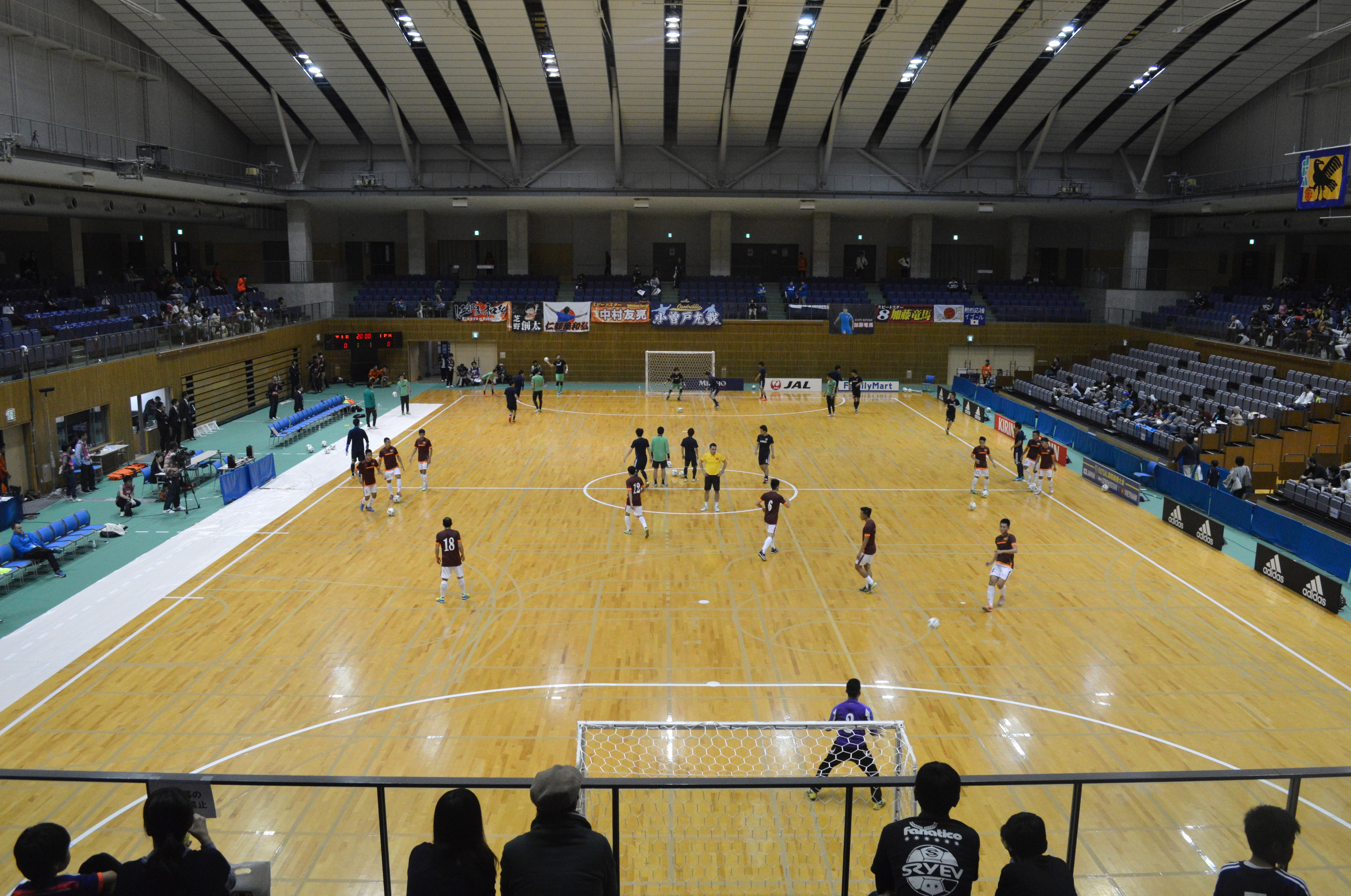

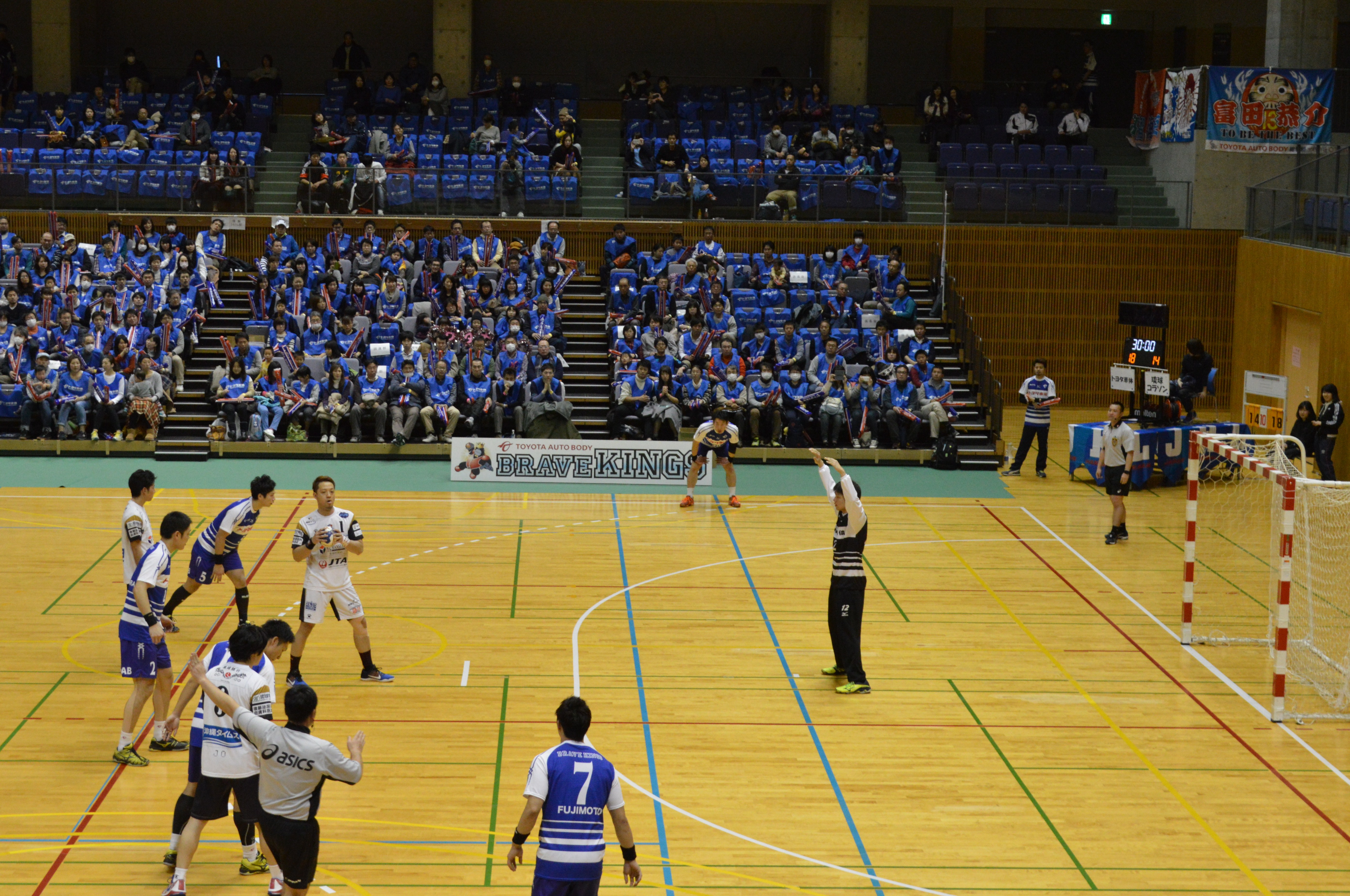

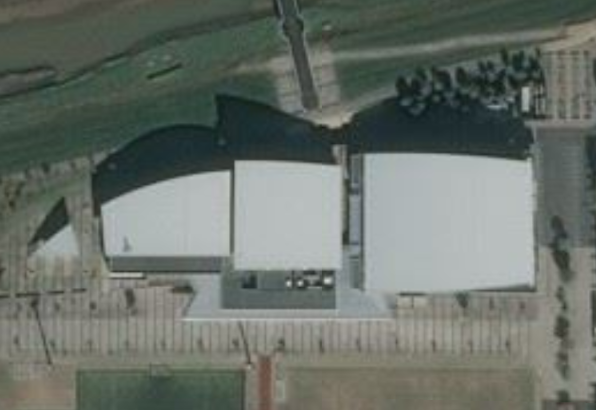
