= Satoru Furuta =

Japanese basketball player

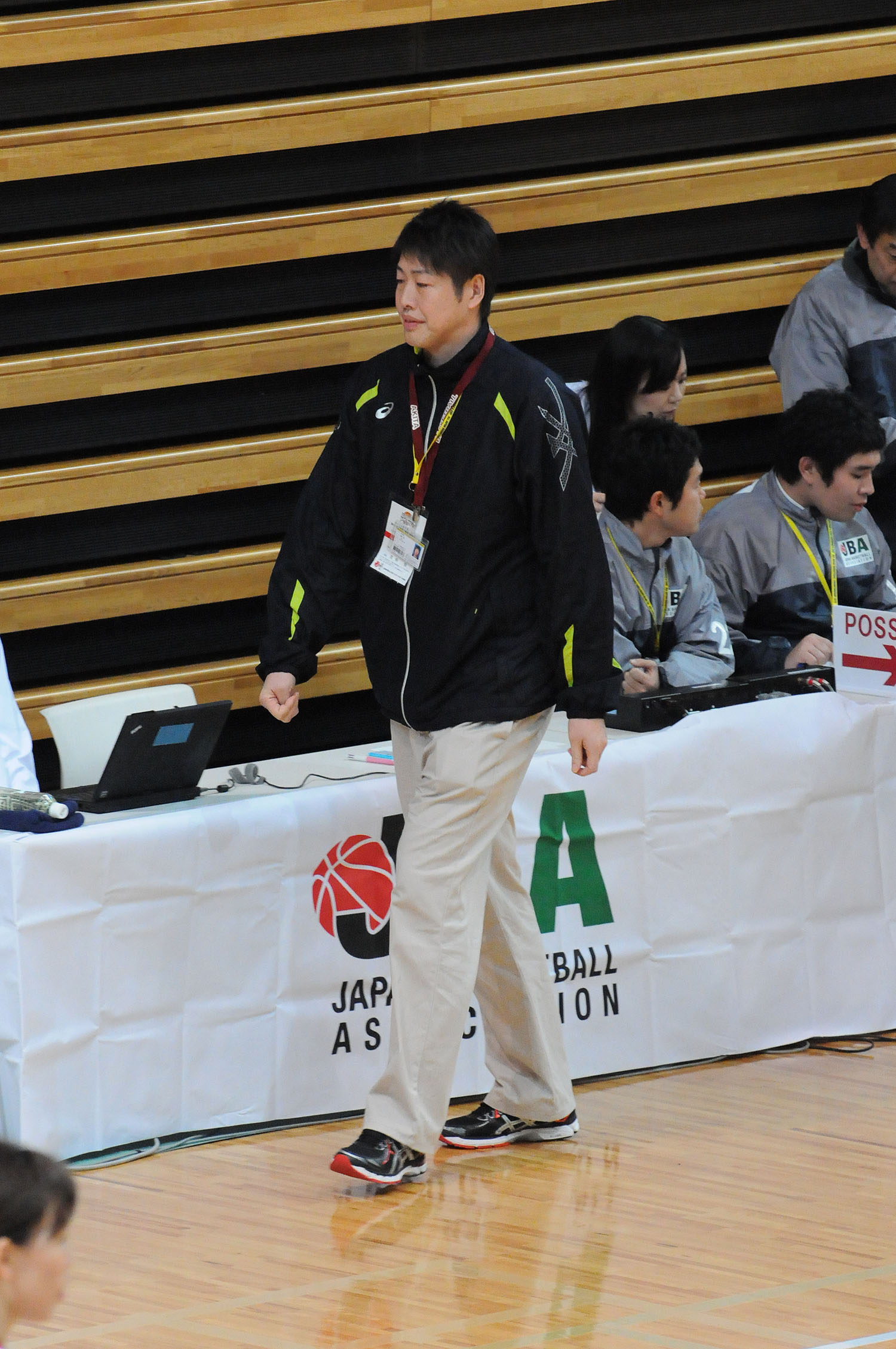
- Furuta coached the Akita Bank team

Yamanashi Gakuin University
- Position: Head coach

Personal information
- Born: August 3, 1971 (age 55) Seto, Aichi
- Listed height: 6 ft 7 in (2.01 m)
- Listed weight: 209 lb (95 kg)

Career information
- High school: Aichi Institute of Technology Meiden
- College: Nippon Sport Science University

Career history

Playing
- 1994–2005: Mitsubishi Electric
- 2005-2011: Toyota Alvark

Coaching
- 2011: Japan national basketball team U-22
- 2012-2013: Edogawa University (asst)
- 2013-2014: Edogawa University
- 2014: Akita Bank
- 2015-2017: Haneda Vickies
- 2017: Yokohama B-Corsairs (associate)
- 2017: Yokohama B-Corsairs
- 2018-2019: Earthfriends Tokyo Z
- 2019-present: Yamanashi Gakuin University
Medals
Men's basketball
Representing Japan
Asian Games
Bronze medal – third place	1994 Hiroshima	Japan
Summer Universiade
Silver medal – second place	1995 Fukuoka	Japan
William Jones Cup
Bronze medal – third place	2002 Taipei	Team

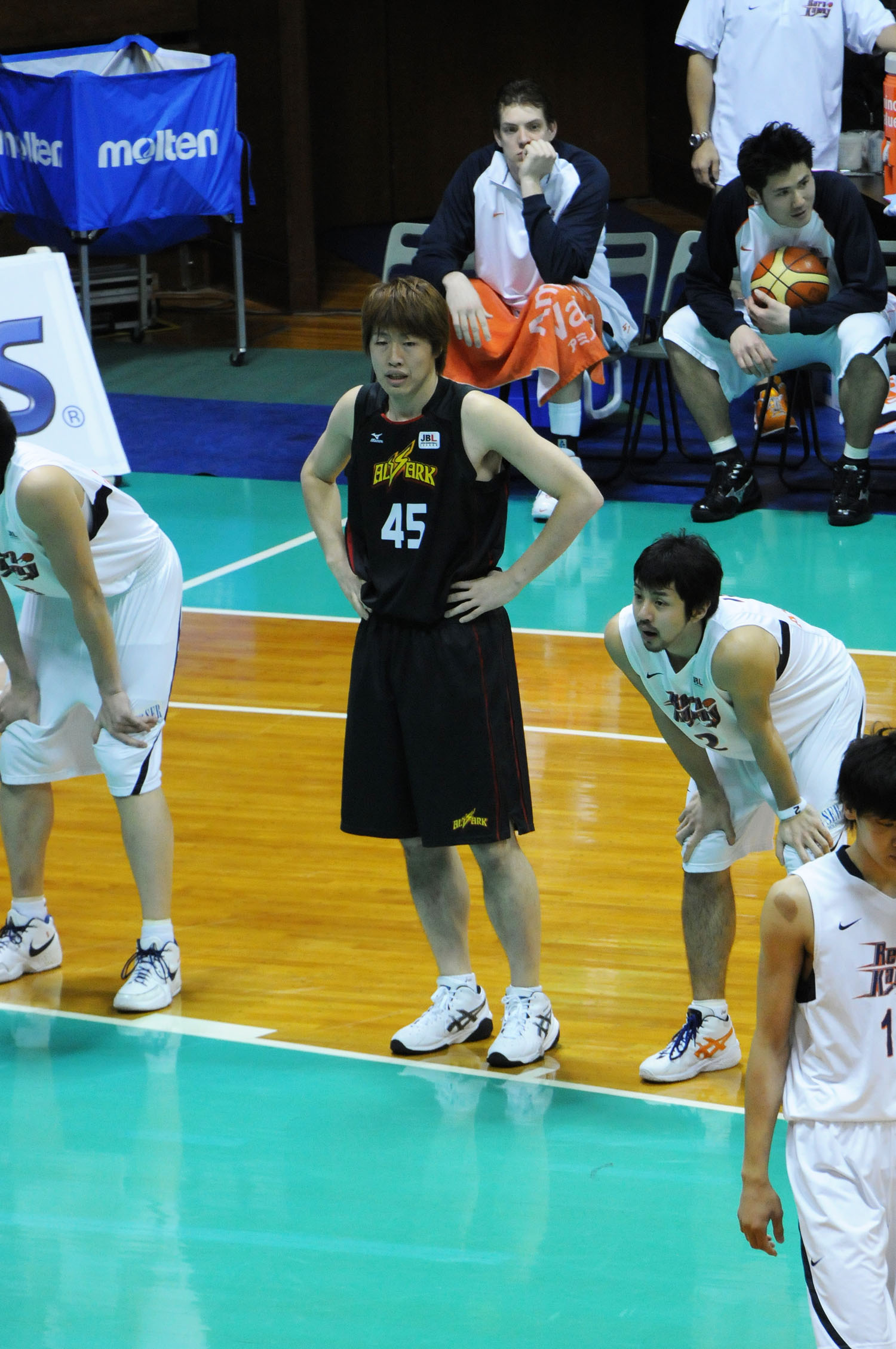
Furuta with Toyota Alvark

Satoru Furuta (古田悟, born 3 August 1971) is a Japanese former basketball player.

== Head coaching record ==
Legend
Regular season	G	Games coached	W	Games won	L	Games lost	W–L %	Win–loss %
Playoffs	PG	Playoff games	PW	Playoff wins	PL	Playoff losses	PW–L %	Playoff win–loss %

Team	Year	G	W	L	W–L%	Finish	PG	PW	PL	PW–L%	Result
Haneda Vickies	2015-16	25	5	20	.200	9th	-	-	-	–	
Haneda Vickies	2016-17	27	10	17	.370	8th	2	0	2	.000	Lost in 1st round
Yokohama B-Corsairs	2017	19	4	15	.211	Fired	-	-	-	–	
Earthfriends Tokyo Z	2018-19	60	22	38	.367	4th in B2 Central	-	-	-	–	
