= Cinmeon Bowers =

American basketball player

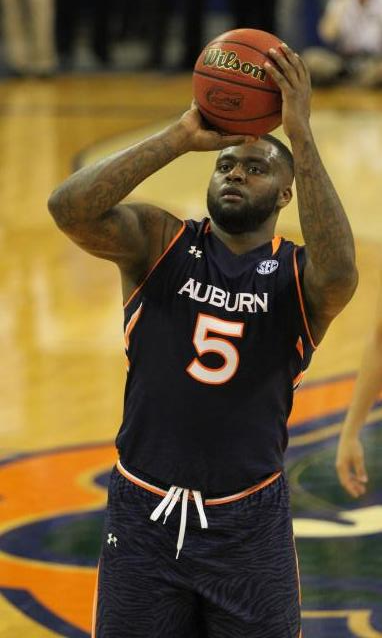
- Bowers shooting for Auburn in 2015

Personal information
- Born: May 1, 1993 (age 33) Racine, Wisconsin, U.S.
- Listed height: 6 ft 7 in (2.01 m)
- Listed weight: 250 lb (113 kg)

Career information
- High school: Rufus King (Milwaukee, Wisconsin)
- College: Chipola College (2012–2014); Auburn (2014–2016)
- NBA draft: 2016: undrafted
- Playing career: 2016–2019
- Position: Power forward

Career history
- 2016–2017: Hapoel Galil Elyon
- 2017: Purefoods Star Hotshots
- 2018: Earthfriends Tokyo Z
- 2018: Wisconsin Herd
- 2018–2019: FMP

Cinmeon Henry Bowers (born May 1, 1993) is an American former professional basketball player.

== Professional career ==
In February 2018, Bowers signed with Earthfriends Tokyo Z in Japan. Bowers was added to the opening night roster of the Wisconsin Herd on November 1, 2018, after trying out for the team. He was waived by the Herd on December 5, 2018. On December 20, 2018, he signed for FMP of the Basketball League of Serbia and the Adriatic League. FMP parted ways with him in February 2019.

== The Basketball Tournament ==
Cinmeon Bowers played for the Golden Eagles in the 2018 edition of The Basketball Tournament. In 5 games, he averaged 3.8 points, .8 assists, and 1.4 rebounds per game. The Golden Eagles reached the semi-finals before falling to Overseas Elite.

== Career statistics ==
=== College ===
==== NCAA Division I ====
All statistics per Sports Reference.

Year	Team	GP	GS	MPG	FG%	3P%	FT%	RPG	APG	SPG	BPG	PPG
2014–15	Auburn	34	34	30.1	.416	.179	.478	9.6	1.3	1.1	.6	12.1
2015–16	Auburn	30	20	28.5	.369	.246	.538	9.6	1.6	1.0	.4	10.5
Career		64	54	29.3	.396	.225	.505	9.6	1.4	1.0	.5	11.4

==== JUCO ====
Year	Team	GP	GS	MPG	FG%	3P%	FT%	RPG	APG	SPG	BPG	PPG
2012–13	Chipola	-	-	–	-	-	-	-	-	-	-	-
2013–14	Chipola	22	15	7.0	.472	.176	.483	8.9	.7	1.3	.2	12.4
Career		22	15	7.0	.472	.176	.483	8.9	.7	1.3	.2	12.4
