= Tokyo Haneda Vickies =

Tokyo Haneda Vickies 東京羽田ヴィッキーズ
- League: Women's Japan Basketball League
- Founded: 1971
- History: Ebara Corporation Hello Vickies; Ebara Vickies; Haneda Vickies
- Arena: Ota City General Gymnasium
- Capacity: 4,212
- Location: Ota, Tokyo
- Head coach: Mikiko Hagiwara
- Website: vickies.jp
Home	Away

The Tokyo Haneda Vickies (東京羽田ヴィッキーズ, Tōkyō Haneda Vikkīzu) are a Japanese professional basketball team based in Ota, Tokyo. The Vickies compete in the "Premier" first division of the Women's Japan Basketball League.

== Notable players ==
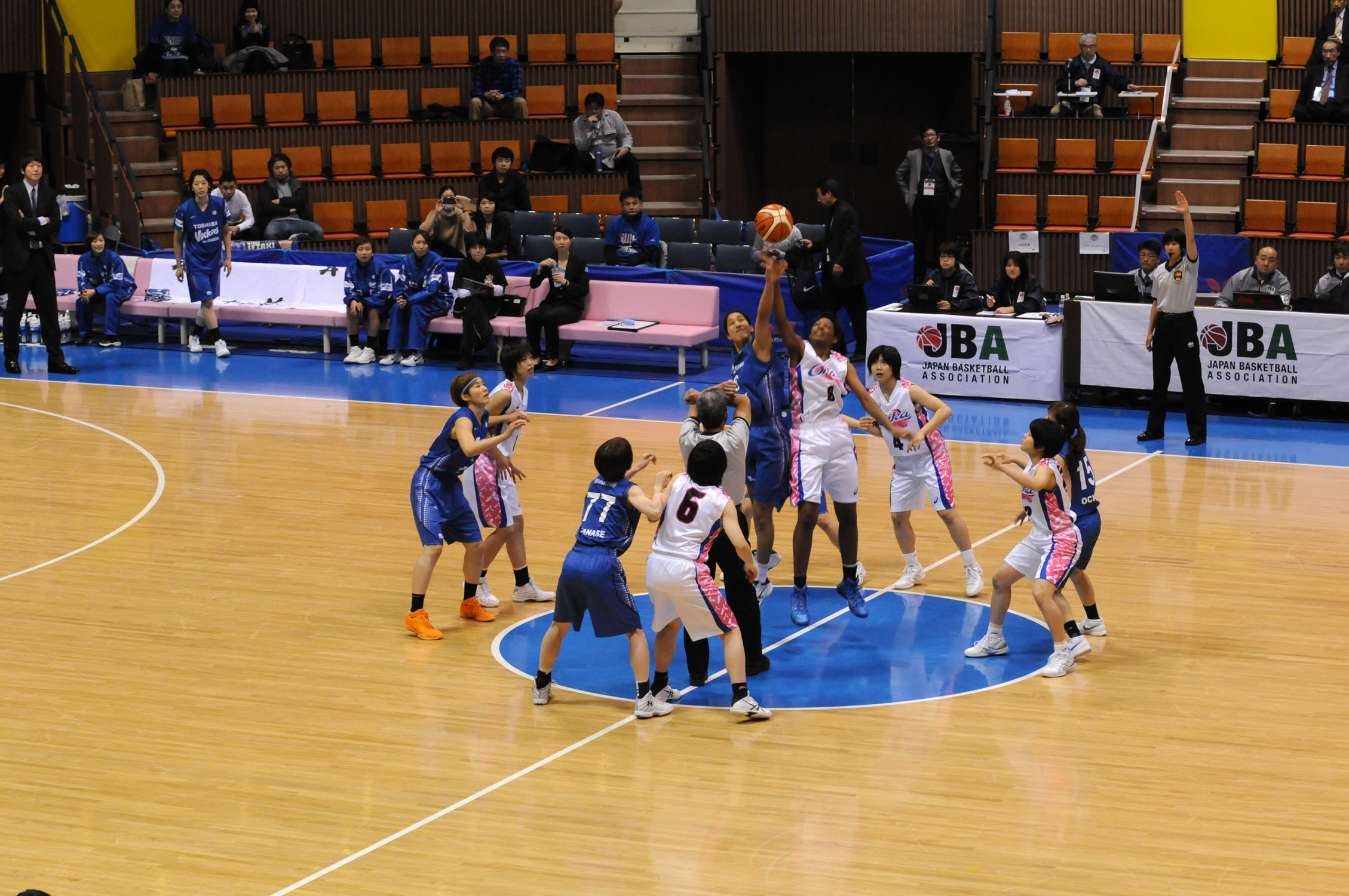
Vickies (blue)

- Asuka Hiramatsu
- Mami Koyama (basketball)
- Nako Motohashi
- Saori Yoshida

== Coaches ==
- Kiyohide Kuwata
- Satoru Furuta
- Koju Munakata
- Mikiko Hagiwara

== Venues ==
- Minatoku Sports Center
- Omori Sports Center
