= Earthfriends Tokyo Z =

- Division: Third
- League: B.League
- Founded: 2014
- Arena: Ota City General Gymnasium
- Capacity: 4,012
- Location: Ota, Tokyo
- General manager: Miki Hirose
- Head coach: Kohei Eto
- Website: eftokyo-z.jp
Home	Away

Earthfriends Tokyo Z is a Japanese professional basketball team based in Tokyo. The team most recently competed in the third division of the B.League. Starting from the 2026–27 season, the team will compete in the B.League One, the league's second division, as a member of the Eastern Conference.

== Roster ==
Earthfriends Tokyo Z roster
Players
Coaches

Pos.	No.	Nat.	Name
SF	0	(Japan)	Yoshi Louis Takemoto
PG	1	(United States)	Cameron Parker
C	3	(Japan)	Samba Faye
PF	4	(United States)	Jacob Lampkin
SF	7	(United States)	Nick Allen
PG	13	(Japan)	Yuya Ukeda
SG	22	(Japan)	Ryota Kondo (C)
PG	28	(Japan)	Takumi Ide
SG	32	(Japan)	Kosuke Tanahashi
SG	78	(Japan)	Keijiro Ikeda
PG	78	(Japan)	Kazusa Kinjo

Head coach

(Japan) Kohei Eto

Assistant coach(es)

(Japan) Tomoyuki Umeda

Legend

- (C) Team captain
- Injured

- Roster
Updated: October 21, 2023

== Notable players ==
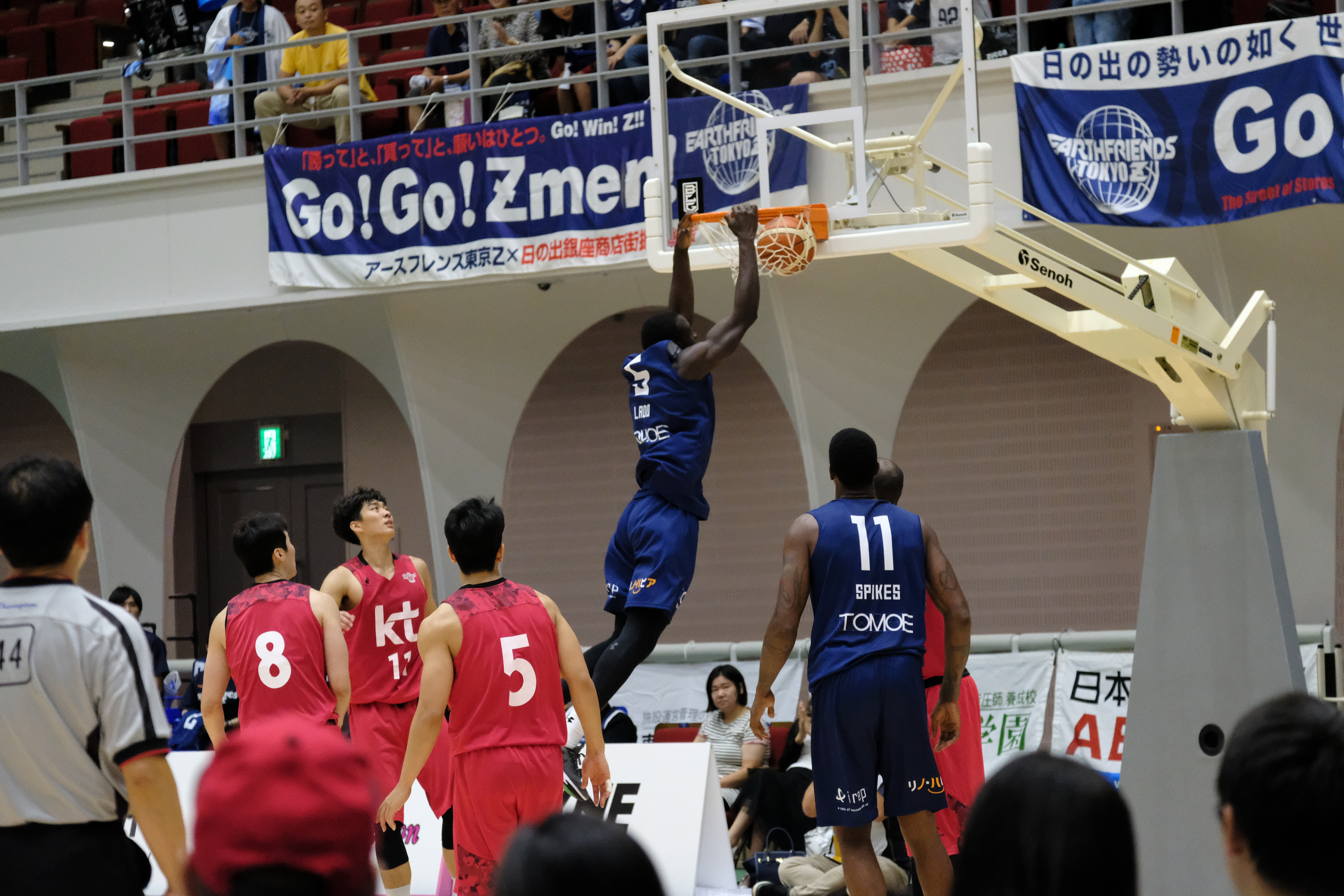

- Shinji Akiba
- Zach Andrews
- Cinmeon Bowers
- Ruben Boykin
- Kyle Casey
- Will Creekmore
- Nnanna Egwu
- Luke Evans (fr)
- Robert Gilchrist
- Deon Jones
- Nigel Spikes
- Ričmonds Vilde

== Coaches ==
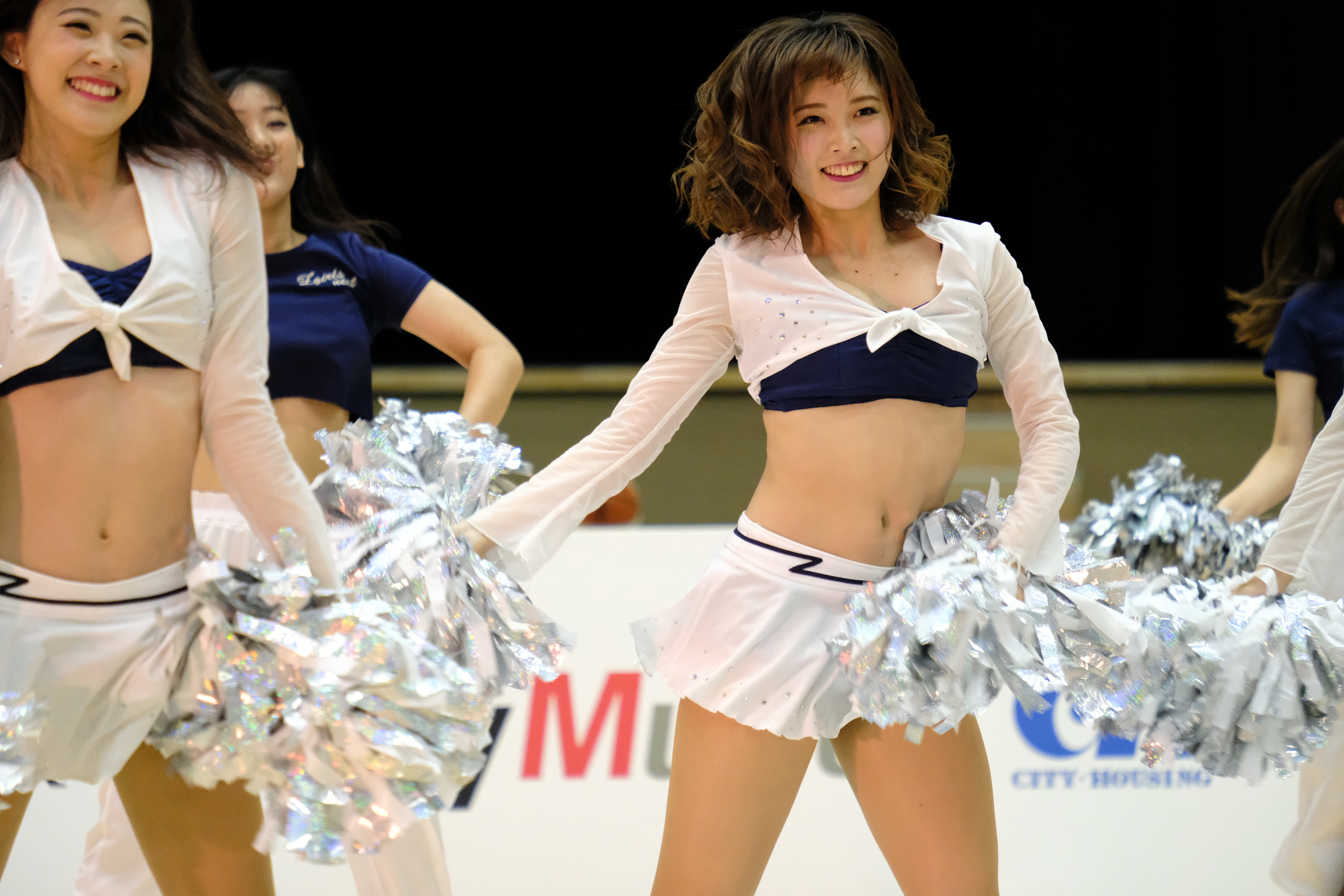
Zgirls

- Shuji Ono
- Taku Saito
- Satoru Furuta
- Shunsuke Todo
- Hugo López

== Arenas ==
- Ota City General Gymnasium
- Nihon Kogakuin Arena
- Setagaya Ward Okura Sports Park Gymnasium
