= Ota City General Gymnasium =

Arena in Ōta, Tokyo, Japan

Coordinates: 35°33′52.2″N 139°43′40.3″E

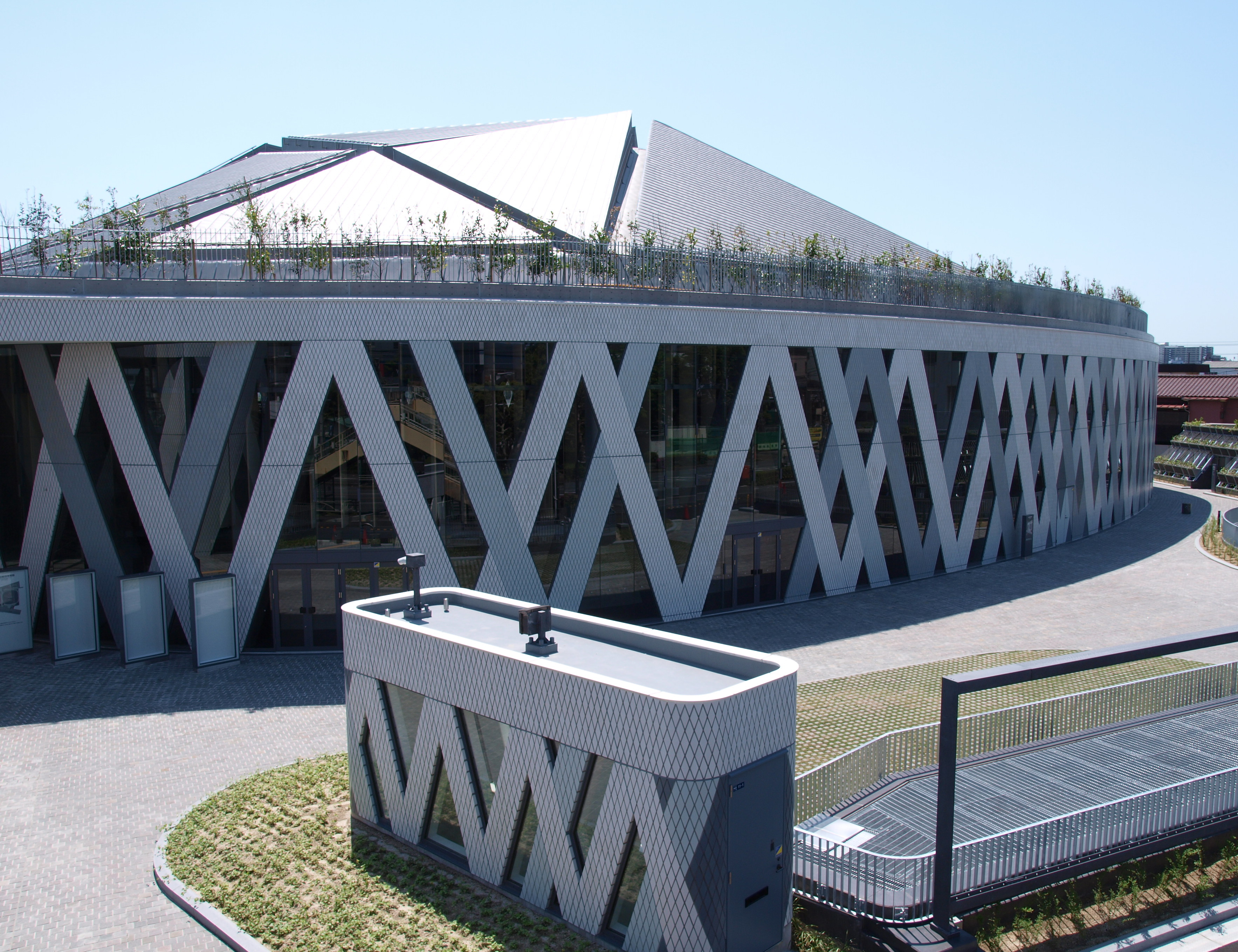
- Interactive map of Ota City General Gymnasium
- Full name: Ota City General Gymnasium
- Location: Ōta, Tokyo, Japan
- Owner: Ōta, Tokyo
- Operator: Sumitomo Realty & Development Esforta
- Capacity: main arena 4,012 second arena 200
- Scoreboard: Daktronics centerhung scoreboard SS-80X144-20i-RGB-10 224×672

Construction
- Built: 2009
- Opened: 2012
- Cost: JPY 6.85 billion
- Architects: Ishimoto Architectural & Engineering
- Structural engineer: Shigeru Ban
- Main contractor: Fujita Corporation

Tenants
- Earthfriends Tokyo Z Tokyo Cinq Reves; Haneda Vickies; B.League U15 Championship

Website
- http://www.ota.esforta.jp/ http://www.ota.esforta.jp/pdf/english.pdf

Ota City General Gymnasium, also known as EBARA WAVE Arena Ota, is an arena in Ōta, Tokyo, Japan. It is the home arena of the Earthfriends Tokyo Z of the B.League, Japan's professional basketball league.

Since 2012, the gymnasium has regularly held boxing events, with many notable world championship fights.

== Gallery ==
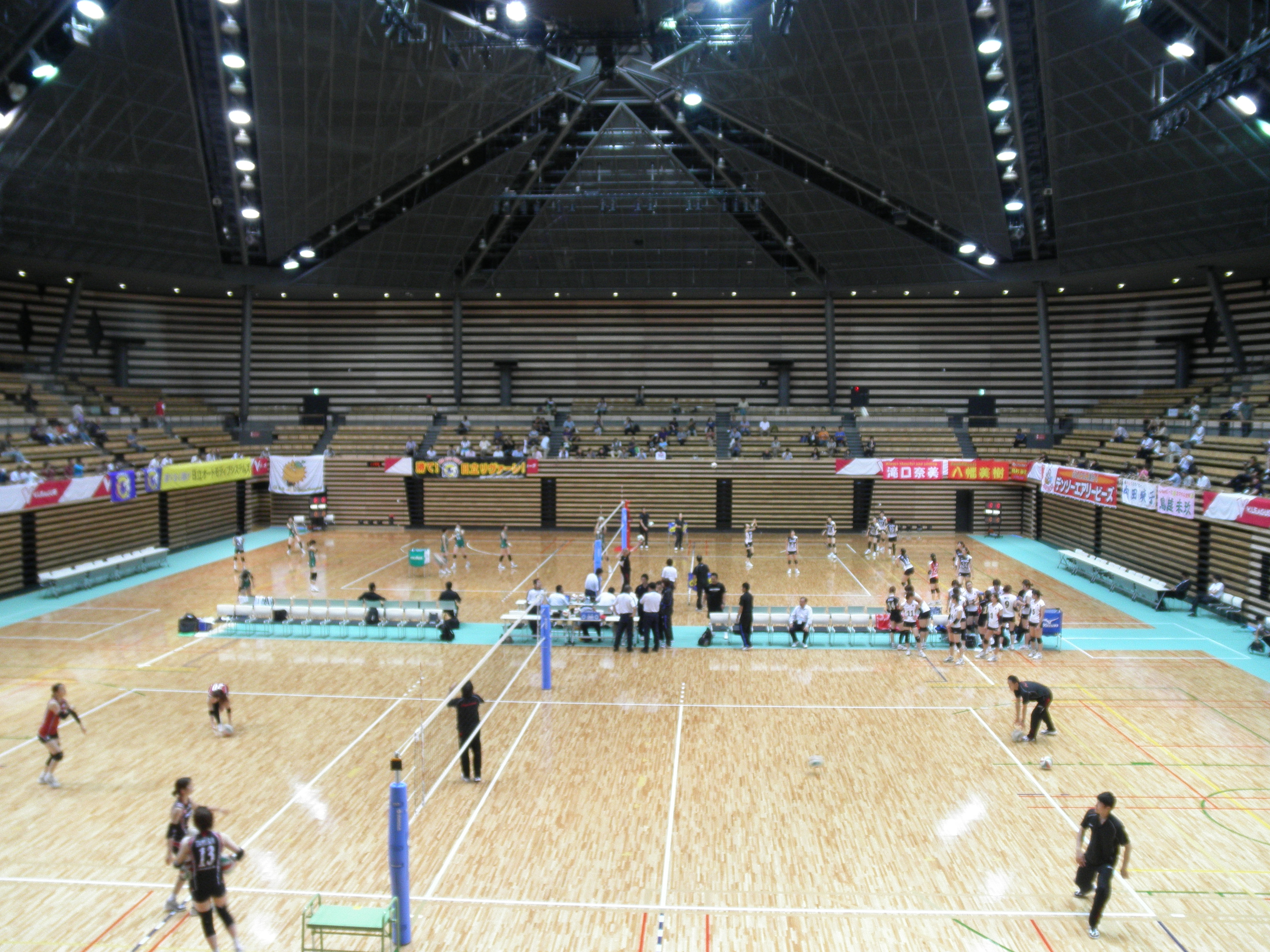
Main Arena

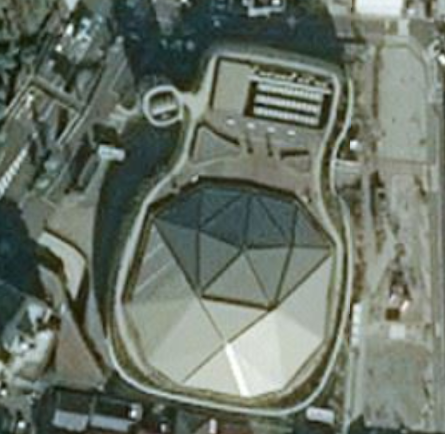
Satellite view

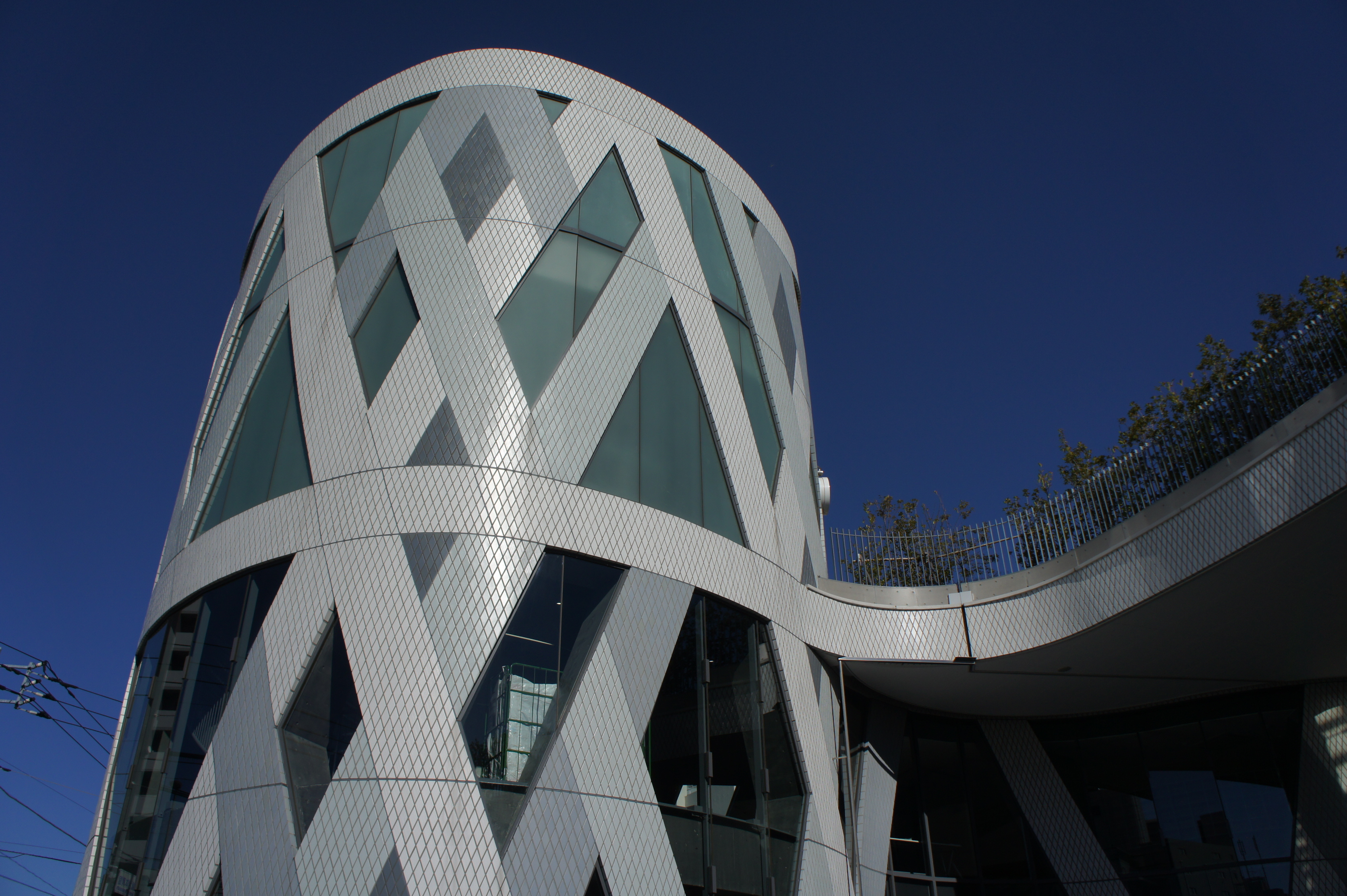

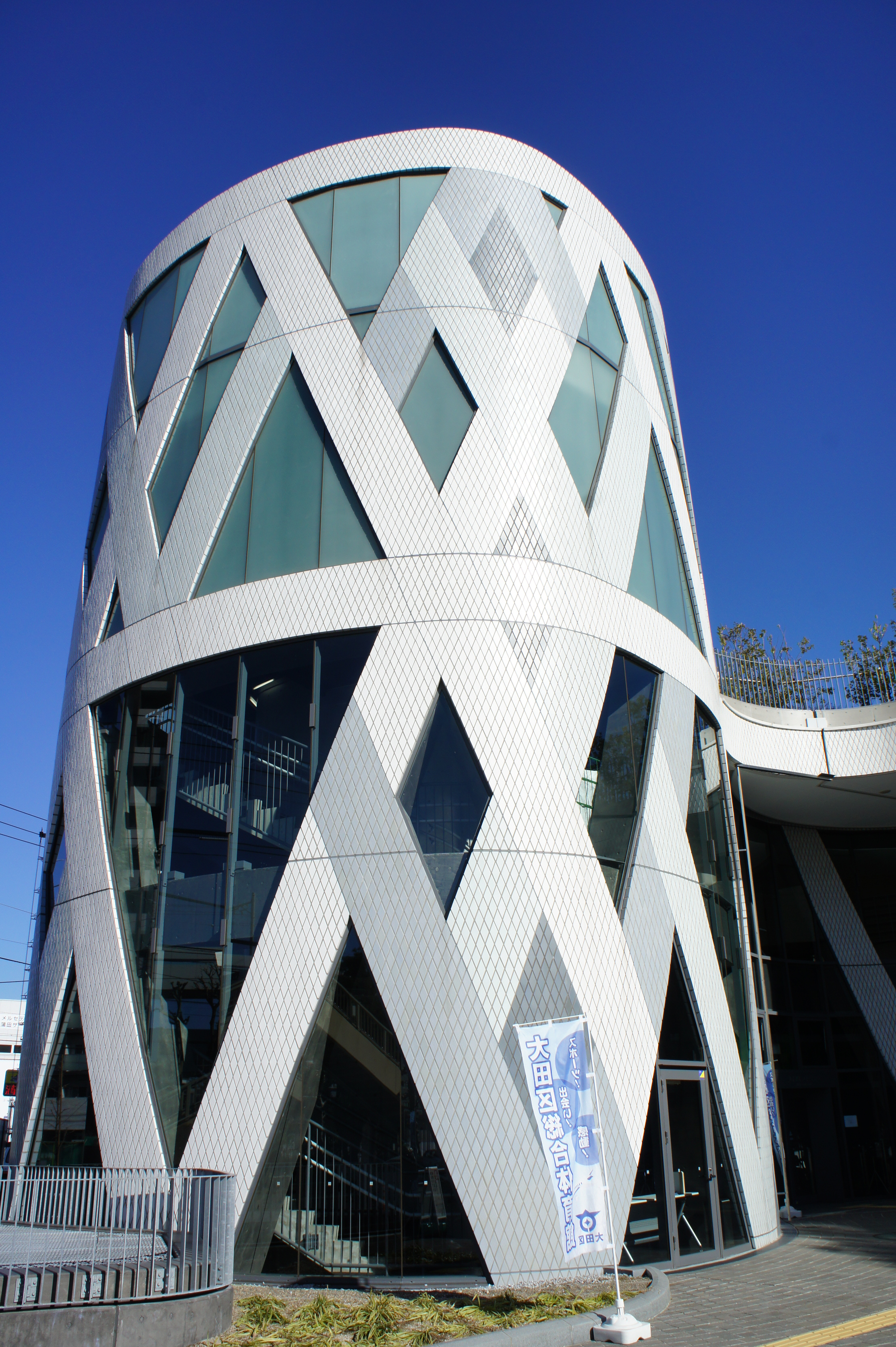

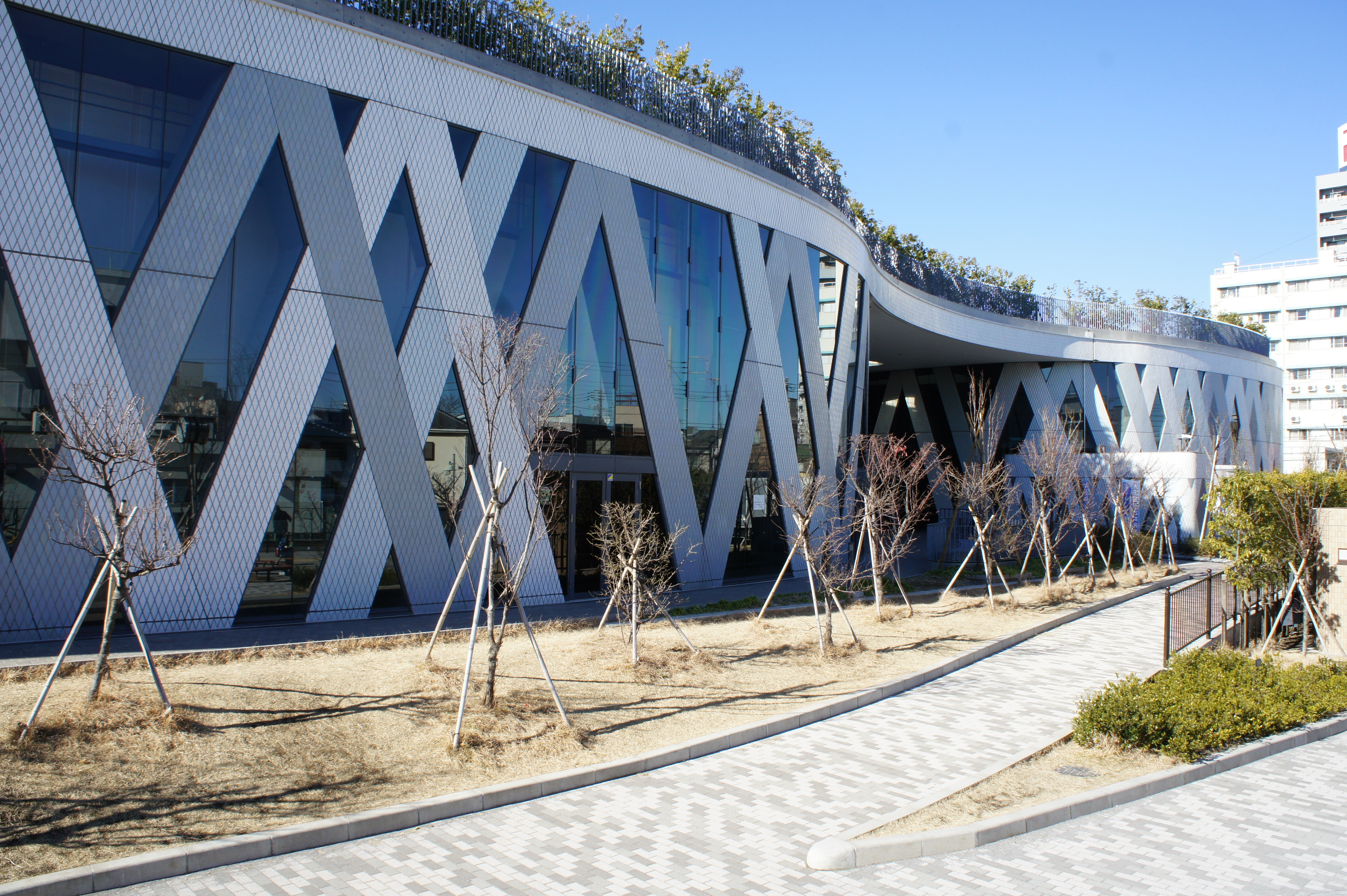

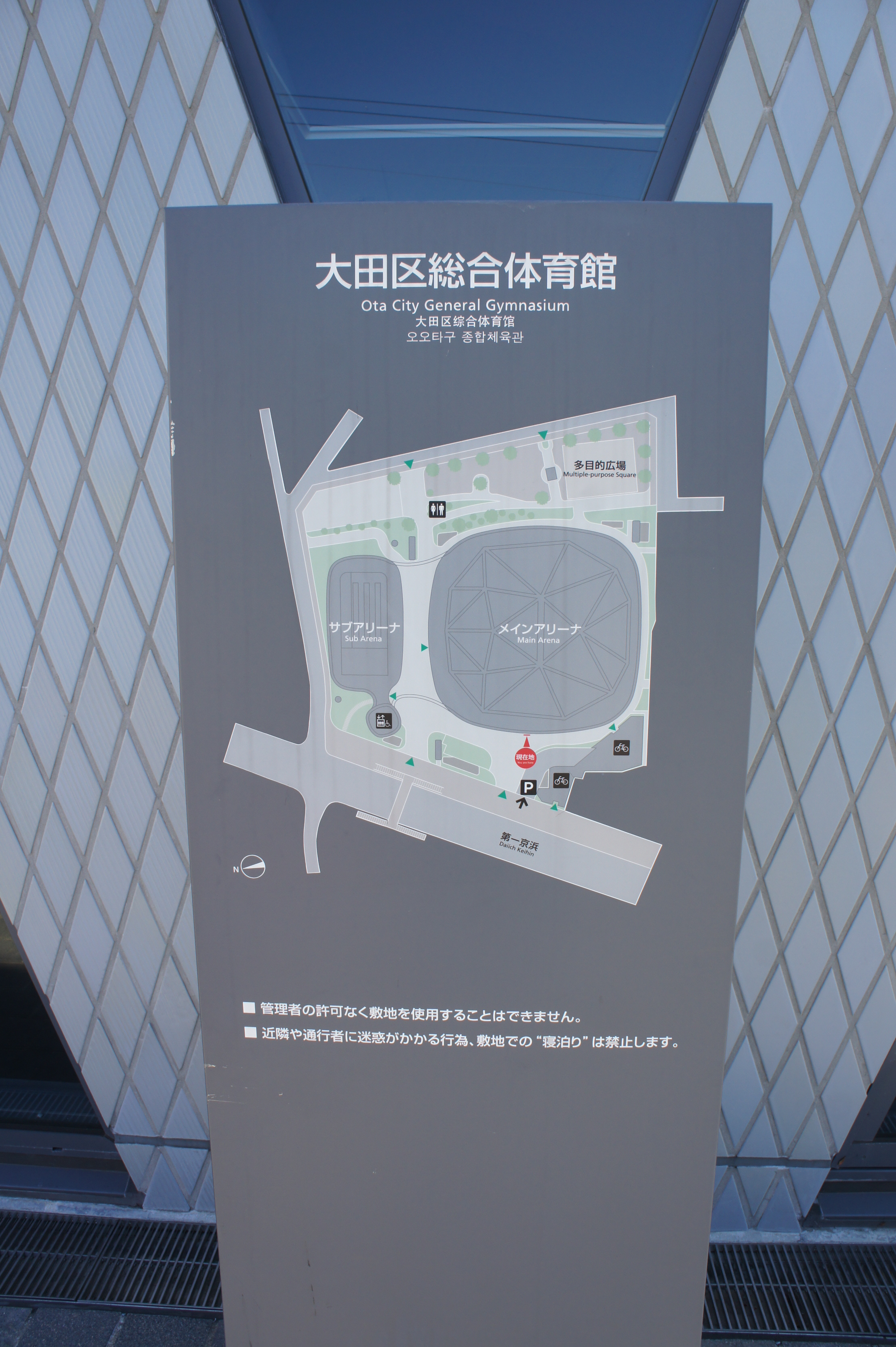
