= Women's Japan Basketball League =

Women's Japan Basketball League 一般社団法人バスケットボール女子日本リーグ
- Founded: 1998
- Country: Japan
- Confederation: FIBA Asia (Asia)
- Number of teams: 15
- Level on pyramid: 1
- Most championships: Denso Iris (1 title)
- President: Yuka Harada
- Website: WJBL

The Women's Japan Basketball League (Japanese: 一般社団法人バスケットボール女子日本リーグ, romanized: Ippanshadanhōjin Basukettobōru Joshi Nihon Rīgu) is a professional women's basketball league in Japan. The league is composed of 15 teams across two divisions, with 8 teams competing in the "Premier" (プレミア, Puremia) first division, and 7 in the "Future" (フューチャー, Fyūchā) second division. The league is commonly referred to simply as the W League (Wリーグ).

== History ==
The league was founded in 1998, with the Chanson V-Magic winning the inaugural title.

From 2024–25 there was a change to a two level league structure, with the “W League Premier” being the top league, and the “W League Future” being the lower league.

== Leadership ==
In June 2023, former player and sports broadcaster Yuka Harada became president of the league.

Previous presidents include:

- Businessperson Kiyomi Saito 2015-2021
- Film Director Naomi Kawase 2021-2023

== Teams ==
Overview of WJBL teams
Division	Team	Location	Arena	Founded	Joined
Premier Division	Fujitsu Red Wave	Kawasaki, Kanagawa	Kawasaki City Todoroki Arena	1985	1994
Premier Division	Denso Iris	Kariya, Aichi	Wing Arena Kariya	1985	1993
Premier Division	Chanson V-Magic	Shizuoka, Shizuoka	Konohana Arena	1962	1977
Premier Division	Eneos Sunflowers	Kashiwa, Chiba	Kashiwa Central Gymnasium	1969	1976
Premier Division	Toyota Antelopes	Nagoya, Aichi	Sky Hall Toyota	1963	1997
Premier Division	Toyota Boshoku Sunshine Rabbits	Kariya, Aichi	Wing Arena Kariya	1980	2004
Premier Division	Aisin Wings	Anjō, Aichi	Tōsho Arena Anjō	1979	2000
Premier Division	Tokyo Haneda Vickies	Ōta, Tokyo	Ota City General Gymnasium	1972	2001
Future Division	Hitachi High-Tech Cougars	Hitachinaka, Ibaraki	Hitachinaka General Gymnasium	1961	2000
Future Division	Mitsubishi Electric Koalas	Nagoya, Aichi	Aichi Prefectural Gymnasium	1956	1999
Future Division	Yamanashi Queenbees	Kai, Yamanashi	Kai Shikishima Gymnasium	1968	1999
Future Division	Niigata Albirex BB Rabbits	Niigata, Niigata	Niigata Toyano General Gymnasium	1967*	2000
Future Division	Prestige International Aranmare Akita	Akita, Akita	Masuda Gymnasium	2015	2021
Future Division	Hiroshima Egrets	Hiroshima, Hiroshima		2013	2022
Future Division	SMBC Tokyo Solua	Chiyoda, Tokyo	Arena Tachikawa Tachihi	1955	2025

Notes:

- The Niigata Albirex BB Rabbits were formerly known as the JAL Rabbits. The team came under new ownership and was reorganized in 2011.
- The Hiroshima Egrets were formerly known as the Himeji Egrets. In 2026, the team relocated to Hiroshima after being purchased by the Hiroshima Dragonflies ownership group.
Locations of the WJBL teams
Locations of the WJBL Kanto teams
Locations of the WJBL Aichi teams

== Champions ==
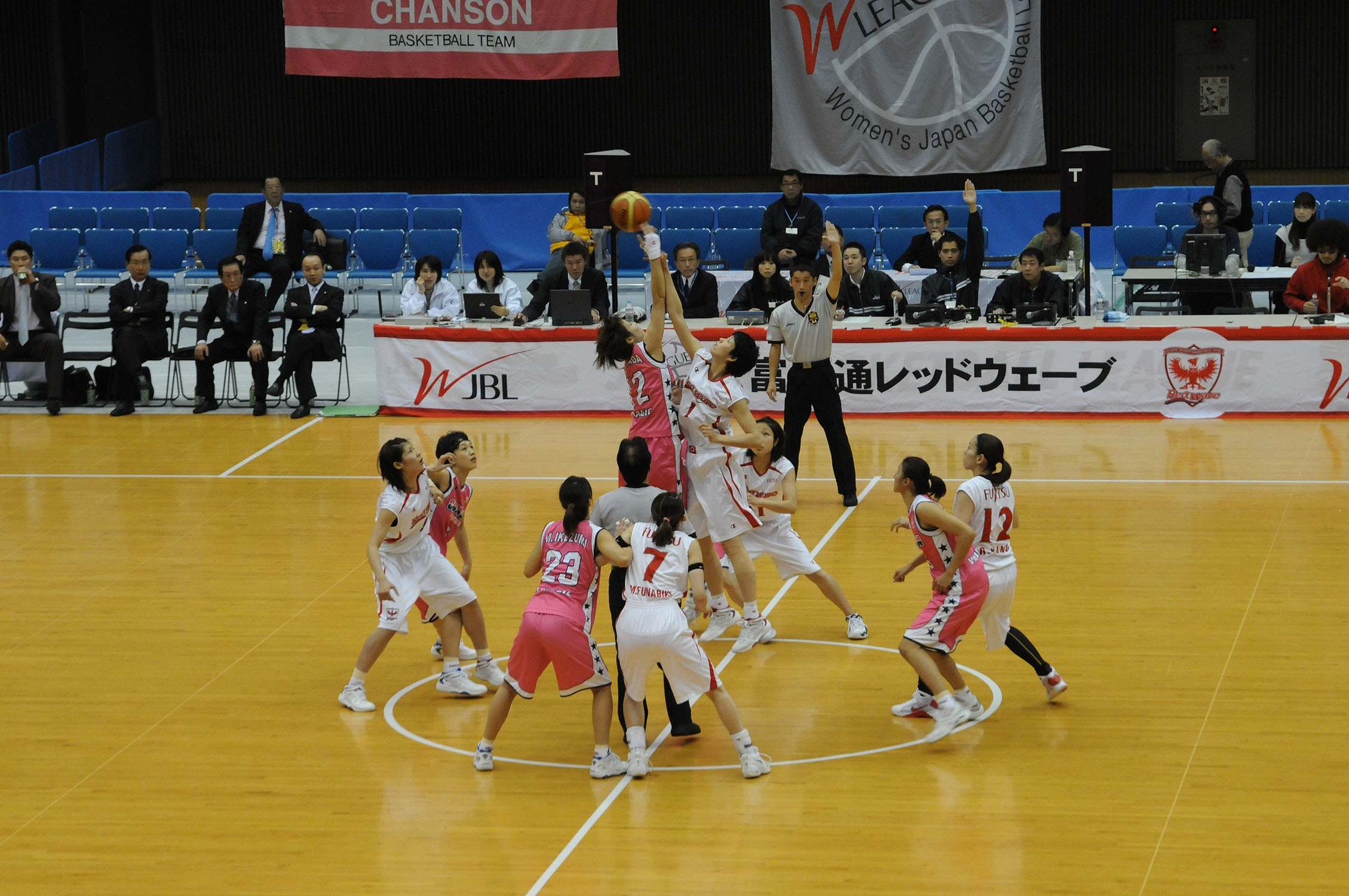
WJBL 08-09 Regular League, Fujitsu vs Chanson

- 1999–00: Chanson V-Magic
- 2000–01: JOMO Sunflowers
- 2001–02: JOMO Sunflowers
- 2002–03: JOMO Sunflowers
- 2003–04: JOMO Sunflowers
- 2004–05: Chanson V-Magic
- 2005–06: Chanson V-Magic
- 2006–07: JOMO Sunflowers
- 2007–08: Fujitsu Redwave
- 2008–09: JOMO Sunflowers
- 2009–10: JOMO Sunflowers
- 2010–11: JX Sunflowers
- 2011–12: JX Sunflowers
- 2012–13: JX Sunflowers
- 2013–14: JX Sunflowers
- 2014–15: JX-Eneos Sunflowers
- 2015–16: JX-Eneos Sunflowers
- 2016–17: JX-Eneos Sunflowers
- 2017–18: JX-Eneos Sunflowers
- 2018–19: JX-Eneos Sunflowers
- 2019–20: Cancelled due to the COVID-19 pandemic in Japan
- 2020–21: Toyota Antelopes
- 2021–22: Toyota Antelopes
- 2022–23: Eneos Sunflowers
- 2023–24: Fujitsu Redwave
- 2024–25: Fujitsu Red Wave
- 2025–26: Denso Iris

== See also ==
- Women's Basketball League Asia
