= 1998 FIBA World Championship squads =

The 1998 FIBA World Championship squads were the squads of the 1998 FIBA World Championship. The list includes the 12-man rosters of the 16 participating countries, totaling 192 players.

== Group A ==
=== Canada ===
Head coach: Steve Konchalski

#	Pos	Name	Year born	Team
4	Guard	Joey Vickery	1967	(France) Poissy-Chatou Basket
5	Guard	Sherman Hamilton	1972	(Finland) Espoon Honka
6	Guard	David Daniels	1971	
7	Guard	Greg Francis	1974	(United Kingdom) Worthing Bears
8	Forward	William Njoku	1972	(Portugal) Illianbum Taka
9	Guard	Rowan Barrett	1972	(Spain) Lucentum Alicante
10	Forward	Kory Hallas	1969	(France) Poissy-Chatou Basket
11	Center	Todd MacCulloch	1976	(United States) Washington Huskies
12	Center	Martin Keane	1969	(Spain) Melilla Baloncesto
13	Forward	Peter Guarasci	1974	(Italy) Scavolini Pesaro
14	Forward	Michael Meeks	1972	(Germany) Brandt Hagen
15	Center	Greg Newton	1974	(Belgium) Siemens Gent

=== Greece ===
Head coach: Panagiotis Giannakis

#	Pos	Name	Year born	Team
4	Guard	Giorgos Kalaitzis	1976	(Greece) Panathinaikos
5	Forward	Giorgos Balogiannis	1971	(Greece) PAOK
6	Guard	Nikos Boudouris	1971	(Greece) PAOK
7	Forward	Dimitrios Papanikolaou	1977	(Greece) Olympiacos
8	Guard	Giorgos Sigalas	1971	(Italy) Stefanel Milano
9	Guard	Angelos Koronios	1969	(Greece) Peristeri
10	Forward	Fragiskos Alvertis	1974	(Greece) Panathinaikos
11	Forward	Nikos Oikonomou	1973	(Greece) Panathinaikos
12	Center	Iakovos Tsakalidis	1979	(Greece) AEK Athens
13	Center	Panagiotis Fasoulas	1963	(Greece) Olympiacos
14	Center	Efthimios Rentzias	1976	(Spain) FC Barcelona
15	Forward	Giorgos Karagkoutis	1976	(Greece) Panionios

=== Italy ===
Head coach: Bogdan Tanjević

#	Pos	Name	Year born	Team
4	Guard	Davide Bonora	1973	(Italy) Benetton Treviso
5	Guard	Gianluca Basile	1975	(Italy) CFM Reggio Emilia
6	Forward	Alessandro De Pol	1972	(Italy) Pallacanestro Varese
7	Forward	Gregor Fučka	1971	(Italy) Teamsystem Bologna
8	Guard	Gianmarco Pozzecco	1972	(Italy) Pallacanestro Varese
9	Forward	Giacomo Galanda	1975	(Italy) Teamsystem Bologna
10	Guard	Carlton Myers	1971	(Italy) Teamsystem Bologna
11	Guard	Andrea Meneghin	1974	(Italy) Pallacanestro Varese
12	Guard	Alessandro Abbio	1971	(Italy) Kinder Bologna
13	Center	Alessandro Frosini	1972	(Italy) Kinder Bologna
14	Center	Roberto Chiacig	1974	(Italy) Teamsystem Bologna
15	Center	Marcelo Damiao	1975	(Italy) CFM Reggio Emilia

=== Senegal ===
Head coach: Ousseynou Ndiaga Diop

#	Pos	Name	Year born	Team
4	Guard	Samba Aly Ngoné Niang	1973	(Senegal) ASFO Dakar
5	Center	Omar Ba	1972	(France) Brêmes
6	Forward	Boubacar Aw	1975	(United States) Georgetown Hoyas
7	Center	Makhtar N'Diaye	1973	(United States) North Carolina Tar Heels
8	Guard	Kader Fall	1975	(Saudi Arabia) KSA
9	Guard	Vincent Da Sylva	1973	(Lebanon) Wardie Rosaire Mansourieh
10	Guard/forward	Mamadou Diouf	1977	(United States) University of Delaware
11	Guard	Raymond Carvalho	1969	(Senegal) JA Dakar
12	Guard	Mouhamadou Sow	1968	(Senegal) Asdouane Dakar
13	Center	Mamadou N'diaye	1975	(United States) Auburn Tigers
14	Forward	Cheikh Yaya Dia	1974	(Argentina) Regatas San Nicolás
15	Center	Assane Ndiaye	1975	(Lebanon) Club Sagesse

== Group B ==
=== Japan ===
Head coach: Mototaka Kohama

#	Pos	Name	Year born	Team
4	Center	Akifumi Yamasaki	1968	(Japan) Matsushita Electric
5	Forward	Takeshi Yuki	1968	(Japan) Aisin Seahorses
6	Forward	Hiroshi Nagano	1967	(Japan) Isuzu Motor
7	Guard	Kenichi Sako	1970	(Japan) Isuzu Motor
8	Guard	Makoto Hasegawa	1971	(Japan) Zexel
9	Guard	Takehiko Orimo	1970	(Japan) Toyota Alvark
10	Guard	Takahiro Setsumasa	1972	(Japan) Toshiba Brave Thunders
11	Guard	Makoto Minamiyama	1973	(Japan) Isuzu Motor
12	Forward	Michael Takahashi	1974	(Japan) Isuzu Motor
13	Forward	Satoru Furuta	1971	(Japan) Mitsubishi Diamond Dolphins
14	Guard	Satoshi Sakumoto	1972	(Japan) Isuzu Motor
15	Center	Hiroyuki Tominaga	1973	(Japan) Mitsubishi Diamond Dolphins

=== Puerto Rico ===
Head coach: Carlos Morales

#	Pos	Name	Year born	Team
4	Center	José Ortiz	1963	(Greece) Aris
5	Guard	Eddie Casiano	1972	(Puerto Rico) Atléticos de San Germán
6	Guard	Carmelo Travieso	1975	(Puerto Rico) Titanes de Morovis
7	Guard	Eddin "Guayacán" Santiago	1975	(Puerto Rico) Cangrejeros de Santurce
8	Forward	Jerome Mincy	1964	(Puerto Rico) Vaqueros de Bayamón
9	Guard	James Carter	1964	(Puerto Rico) Brujos de Guayama
10	Guard	Javier Antonio Colón	1969	(Puerto Rico) Leones de Ponce
11	Forward	Orlando Vega	1968	(Puerto Rico) Piratas de Quebradillas
12	Forward	Rolando Hourruitiner	1975	(Puerto Rico) Gallitos de Isabela
13	Forward	Edgar de León	1971	(Puerto Rico) Leones de Ponce
14	Center	Daniel Santiago	1976	(Puerto Rico) Vaqueros de Bayamón
15	Forward	Eugenio Soto	1973	(Puerto Rico) Vaqueros de Bayamón

=== Russia ===
Head coach: Sergei Belov

#	Pos	Name	Year born	Team
4	Guard	Vasily Karasev	1971	(Germany) ALBA Berlin
5	Guard	Igor Kudelin	1972	(Russia) CSKA Moscow
6	Forward	Zakhar Pashutin	1974	(Russia) Avtodor Saratov
7	Forward	Evgeni Kisurin	1969	(Croatia) Cibona
8	Guard	Dmitri Domani	1974	(Russia) CSKA Moscow
9	Forward	Valeri Tikhonenko	1964	(Russia) CSKA Moscow
10	Guard	Sergei Babkov	1967	(Spain) Unicaja Málaga
11	Center	Mikhail Mikhailov	1971	(Spain) Real Madrid
12	Forward	Nikita Morgunov	1975	(Lithuania) Atletas Kaunas
13	Center	Igor Kurashov	1972	(Russia) CSKA Moscow
14	Forward	Sergei Panov	1970	(Russia) CSKA Moscow
15	Center	Vitaly Nosov	1968	(Slovenia) Union Olimpija

=== FR Yugoslavia ===
Head coach: Željko Obradović

#	Pos	Name	Year born	Team
4	Forward	Dejan Bodiroga	1973	(Spain) Real Madrid
5	Guard	Vlado Šćepanović	1975	(Federal Republic of Yugoslavia) Budućnost Podgorica
6	Guard	Saša Obradović	1969	(Italy) Calze Pompea Roma
7	Forward	Nikola Lončar	1972	(France) PSG Racing
8	Guard	Dragan Lukovski	1975	(Federal Republic of Yugoslavia) Partizan
9	Guard	Miroslav Berić	1973	(Spain) TAU Cerámica
10	Guard	Aleksandar Đorđević	1967	(Spain) FC Barcelona
11	Center	Željko Rebrača	1972	(Italy) Benetton Treviso
12	Center	Predrag Drobnjak	1975	(Federal Republic of Yugoslavia) Partizan
13	Center	Nikola Bulatović	1971	(Federal Republic of Yugoslavia) FMP Železnik
14	Forward	Dejan Tomašević	1973	(Federal Republic of Yugoslavia) Partizan
15	Forward	Milenko Topić	1969	(Federal Republic of Yugoslavia) Crvena zvezda

== Group C ==
=== Brazil ===
Head coach: Hélio Rubens Garcia

#	Pos	Name	Year born	Team
4	Forward	Marcelo Machado	1975	(Brazil) Corinthians
5	Guard	André Fonseca	1969	(Brazil) Flamengo
6	Guard	Caio Cazziolato	1974	(Brazil) Flamengo
7	Forward	João Vianna	1964	(Brazil) Flamengo
8	Center	Sandro Varejão	1972	(United States) West Virginia Mountaineers
9	Guard	Demetrius Ferraciu	1970	(Brazil) Franca
10	Guard	Hélio Filho	1975	(Brazil) Franca
11	Guard	Marco dos Santos	1963	(Brazil) Franca
12	Center	Aristides dos Santos	1970	(Brazil) COC-Ribeirão Preto
13	Forward	Claudio Antonio Clemente	1972	(Brazil) São Paulo
14	Forward	Rogério Klafke	1971	(Brazil) Franca
15	Forward	Joelcio Joerke	1972	(Brazil) Flamengo

=== Lithuania ===
Head coach: Jonas Kazlauskas

#	Pos	Name	Year born	Team
4	Guard	Šarūnas Jasikevičius	1976	(United States) Maryland Terrapins
5	Center	Eurelijus Žukauskas	1973	(Lithuania) Žalgiris
6	Forward	Tomas Masiulis	1975	(Lithuania) Žalgiris
7	Guard	Saulius Štombergas	1973	(Lithuania) Žalgiris
8	Forward	Mindaugas Žukauskas	1975	(Lithuania) Žalgiris
9	Guard	Tomas Pačėsas	1975	(Ukraine) Odesa
10	Guard	Darius Lukminas	1968	(Russia) Avtodor
11	Forward	Dainius Adomaitis	1974	(Lithuania) Žalgiris
12	Forward	Artūras Karnišovas	1971	(Greece) Olympiacos
13	Guard	Darius Maskoliūnas	1971	(Lithuania) Žalgiris
14	Center	Gintaras Einikis	1969	(Russia) Avtodor
15	Center	Virginijus Praškevičius	1979	(Lithuania) Atletas

=== South Korea ===
Head coach: Chung Kwang-suk

#	Pos	Name	Year born	Team
4	Forward	Choo Seung-gyun	1974	(South Korea) Daejeon Hyundai Dynat
5	Guard	Kang Dong-hee	1966	(South Korea) Busan Kia Enterprise
6	Guard	Kim Hee-sun	1973	(South Korea) Suwon Samsung Thunders
7	Guard	Kim Byong-chul	1976	(South Korea) Daegu Tongyang Orions
8	Guard/forward	Cho Sang-hyun	1976	(South Korea) Yonsei University
9	Forward	Hyun Joo-yup	1975	(South Korea) Cheongju SK Knights
10	Guard	Lee Sang-min	1972	(South Korea) Daejeon Hyundai Dynat
11	Center	Seo Jang-hoon	1974	(South Korea) Cheongju SK Knights
12	Forward	Kim Sung-chul	1976	(South Korea) Kyung Hee University
13	Forward	Yang Kyung-min	1973	(South Korea) Sangmu
14	Forward	Moon Kyung-eun	1971	(South Korea) Suwon Samsung Thunders
15	Center	Kim Joo-sung	1979	(South Korea) Chung-Ang University

=== United States ===
Head coach: Rudy Tomjanovich

#	Pos	Name	Year born	Team
4	Guard	Trajan Langdon	1976	(United States) Duke Blue Devils
5	Guard	Michael Hawkins	1972	(Greece) Olympiacos
6	Guard	Kiwane Garris	1974	(United States) Grand Rapids Hoops
7	Forward	Jason Sasser	1974	(Spain) CSF Sevilla
8	Guard	Jimmy King	1973	(United States) Quad City Thunder
9	Forward	Bill Edwards	1971	(Italy) Calze Pompea Roma
10	Guard	Jimmy Oliver	1969	(Spain) CB Ciudad de Huelva
11	Forward	Wendell Alexis	1964	(Germany) ALBA Berlin
12	Center	Gerard King	1972	(Italy) Fontanafredda Siena
13	Forward	David Wood	1964	(Spain) Unicaja Málaga
14	Center	Ashraf Amaya	1971	(United States) Idaho Stampede
15	Center	Brad Miller	1976	(United States) Purdue Boilermakers

== Group D ==
=== Argentina ===
Head coach: Julio Lamas

#	Pos	Name	Year born	Team
4	Forward	Marcelo Nicola	1971	(Spain) FC Barcelona
5	Forward	Hugo Sconochini	1971	(Italy) Kinder Bologna
6	Guard	Alejandro Montecchia	1972	(Argentina) Olimpia de Venado Tuerto
7	Forward	Esteban de la Fuente	1968	(Argentina) Boca Juniors
8	Guard	Juan Ignacio Sánchez	1977	(United States) Temple Owls
9	Guard	Marcelo Milanesio	1965	(Argentina) Atenas de Córdoba
10	Guard	Juan Espil	1968	(Spain) TAU Cerámica
11	Forward	Diego Osella	1969	(Argentina) Atenas de Córdoba
12	Center	Fabricio Oberto	1975	(Argentina) Atenas de Córdoba
13	Guard	Emanuel Ginóbili	1977	(Argentina) Estudiantes de Bahía Blanca
14	Forward	Carlos Simoni	1971	(Argentina) Andino de La Rioja
15	Center	Rubén Wolkowyski	1973	(Argentina) Boca Juniors

=== Australia ===
Head coach:

#	Pos	Name	Year born	Team
4	Forward	Tony Ronaldson	1972	(Australia) South East Melbourne Magic
5	Guard	Brett Maher	1973	(Australia) Adelaide 36ers
6	Forward	Scott Fisher	1963	(Australia) Perth Wildcats
7	Guard	Frank Drmic	1978	(Australia) South East Melbourne Magic
8	Forward	Sam Mackinnon	1976	(Australia) South East Melbourne Magic
9	Forward	Simon Dwight	1976	(Australia) Canberra Cannons
10	Guard	Andrew Gaze	1965	(Australia) Melbourne Tigers
11	Guard	Shane Heal	1970	(Australia) Sydney Kings
12	Center	Ben Melmeth	1975	(Australia) Newcastle Falcons
13	Center	Chris Anstey	1975	(United States) Dallas Mavericks
14	Forward	Andrew Vlahov	1969	(Australia) Perth Wildcats
15	Center	Paul Rogers	1973	(Spain) Real Madrid

=== Nigeria ===
Head coach:

#	Pos	Name	Year born	Team
4	Guard	Kingsley Ogwudire	1972	(United States) Montana State University – Northern
5	Guard	Dominic Okon	1976	(United States) Loyola Ramblers
6	Guard/forward	Olapido Ayinla	1964	(France) ALM Évreux Basket
7	Guard	Daniel Okonkwo	1975	(England) Plymouth Raiders
8	Forward	Mohammed Acha	1973	(Lebanon) Club Sagesse
9	Forward/center	Godwin Owinje	1973	(United States) Dakota Wizards
10	Forward	Julius Nwosu	1971	(Turkey) Galatasaray
11	Center	Yinka Dare	1972	(United States) New Jersey Nets/Orlando Magic
12	Forward	Tunji Awojobi	1973	(Turkey) Kayseri Meysuspor, (Cyprus) PAO Limassol
13	Forward	Obinna Ekezie	1975	(United States) Maryland Terrapins
14	Forward	Peter Aluma	1973	(Venezuela) Toros de Aragua
15	Forward	Emeka Okenwa	1970	(Argentina) Belgrano de San Nicolás

=== Spain ===
Head coach: Lolo Sainz

#	Pos	Name	Year born	Team
4	Guard	Alberto Angulo	1970	(Spain) Real Madrid
5	Guard	Nacho Rodilla	1974	(Spain) Pamesa Valencia
6	Guard	Ignacio Azofra	1969	(Spain) Adecco Estudiantes
7	Center	Juan Antonio Orenga	1966	(Spain) Real Madrid
8	Guard	Ignacio Rodríguez	1970	(Spain) Unicaja Málaga
9	Forward	Carlos Jiménez	1976	(Spain) Adecco Estudiantes
10	Forward	Rodrigo De la Fuente	1976	(Spain) FC Barcelona
11	Guard	Alberto Herreros	1969	(Spain) Real Madrid
12	Forward	José Antonio Paraíso	1971	(Spain) Cáceres CB
13	Forward	Ignacio de Miguel	1973	(Spain) Adecco Estudiantes
14	Forward	Alfonso Reyes	1971	(France) Paris Basket Racing
15	Center	Roberto Dueñas	1975	(Spain) FC Barcelona
