= Basketball at the 1995 Summer Universiade =

Basketball events were contested at the 1995 Summer Universiade in Fukuoka, Japan.

== Medal summary ==
Event	Gold	Silver	Bronze
Men's basketball	United States (USA); Ray Allen; Chucky Atkins; Austin Croshere; Tim Duncan; Brian Evans; Jerod Haase; Othella Harrington; Allen Iverson; Kerry Kittles; Jason Lawson; Charles O'Bannon; Lorenzen Wright	Japan (JPN); Makoto Akaho; Yoshihiko Amano; Satoru Furuta; Atsushi Haga; Makoto Hasegawa; Takuya Kita; Makoto Minamiyama; Kenichi Sako; Satoshi Sekiguchi; Michael Takahashi; Hiroyuki Tominaga; Masanori Waki	Canada (CAN); Frederic Arsenault; Rowan Barrett; Richard Bohne; Greg Francis; Brendan Graves; Peter Guarasci; Matt Hildebrand; Todd MacCulloch; David Picton; Shawn Swords; Peter Van Elswyk; Keith Vassell
Women's basketball	Italy (ITA)	United States (USA)	Japan (JPN)
