= Dwane Casey =

American professional basketball coach (born 1957)

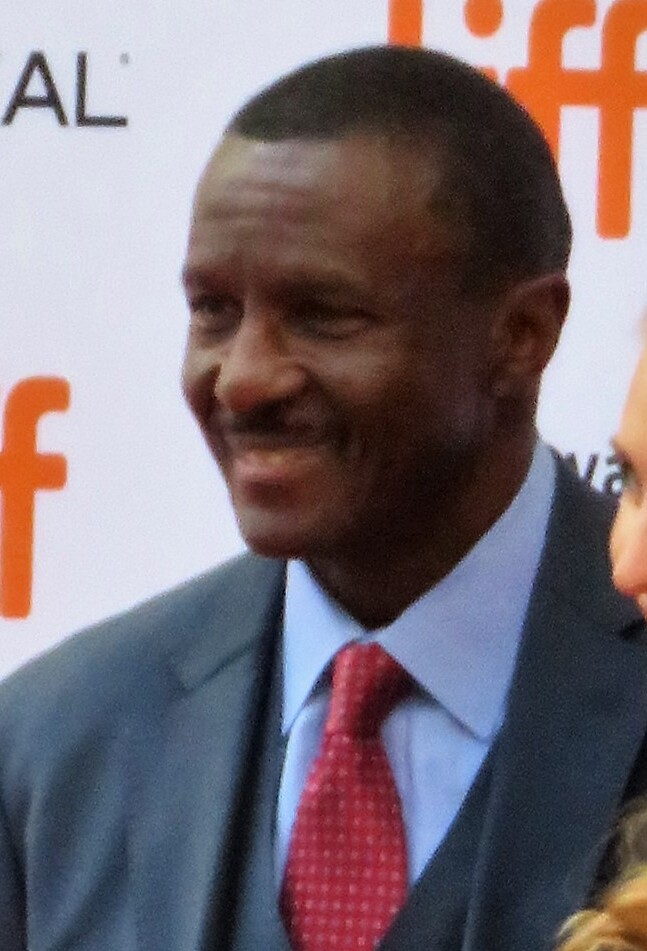
- Casey in 2017

Detroit Pistons
- Position: Member of front office
- League: NBA

Personal information
- Born: April 17, 1957 (age 69) Indianapolis, Indiana, U.S.
- Listed height: 6 ft 2 in (1.88 m)
- Listed weight: 195 lb (88 kg)

Career information
- High school: Union County (Morganfield, Kentucky)
- College: Kentucky (1975–1979)
- NBA draft: 1979: undrafted
- Coaching career: 1979–2023

Career highlights
- As player: NCAA champion (1978); NIT champion (1976); As assistant coach: NBA champion (2011); As head coach: NBA Coach of the Year (2018); NBCA Coach of the Year (2018); NBA All-Star Game head coach (2018); Emperors' Cup winner (1994)

Dwane Lyndon Casey (born April 17, 1957) is an American retired basketball coach who most recently served as the head coach of the Detroit Pistons before transitioning to a front office position with the team. He is a former NCAA basketball player and coach, having played and coached NCAA basketball for over a decade before moving on to the NBA. He was previously the head coach of the Minnesota Timberwolves and the Toronto Raptors, with whom he won the NBA Coach of the Year Award in 2018.

== Early life and education ==
Dwane Lyndon Casey was born on April 17, 1957, in Indianapolis. However, his family moved to Morganfield, Kentucky when he was three years old. Casey graduated from Union County High School in 1975.

Casey was a top recruit coming out of high school. He made the decision to commit to the University of Kentucky. During the 1977–78 Wildcats season, Casey helped guide the team to an NCAA Tournament Championship. He served as team captain during his senior year. During the summers, Casey worked several odd jobs to support himself, including coal mining and tobacco farming.

He graduated from the University of Kentucky with a degree in business administration in 1979, also receiving Kentucky's All-Academic Award that same year.

== Coaching career ==
=== Early career ===
Casey's coaching experience went back to his first coaching job at the age of 13 when Morganfield Baseball Commissioner Earl McKendree allowed the young Casey to coach a Little League team with kids just three years younger than him. He began his college coaching career in 1979 due to a suggestion made by his coach Joe B. Hall. Casey spent a season with Hall as an assistant coach at Kentucky. The next season, Casey made the move to Western Kentucky, where he spent the next five seasons. Casey later returned to Kentucky in 1985 where he would take the role of an assistant coach and top recruiter.

In late March 1988 while still serving as an assistant coach at Kentucky, Emery Worldwide employees discovered $1,000 in cash in an envelope that was accidentally opened. The envelope was addressed to Claud Mills, the father of recruit Chris Mills, and the sender was identified as Casey. The University of Kentucky said that the evidence collected during the investigation was inconclusive, and did not prove that Casey sent the money. The scandal resulted in Casey's resignation, and Casey was then placed on probation for 5 years by the NCAA. The NCAA later rescinded the penalty after it was shown that Casey wasn't involved in sending the package. Casey also settled outside of court in a defamation suit against Emery Worldwide. The case was originally for $6.9 million.

=== Overseas ===
After his resignation from Kentucky, Casey accepted a head coaching job in the Japanese Basketball League. During his time there, Casey coached for Sekisui Chemical and Isuzu Motors Lynx that his teammate Jack Givens played for. While in Japan, Casey did coaching work for the national team alongside longtime friend Mototaka Kohama and veteran coach Pete Newell.

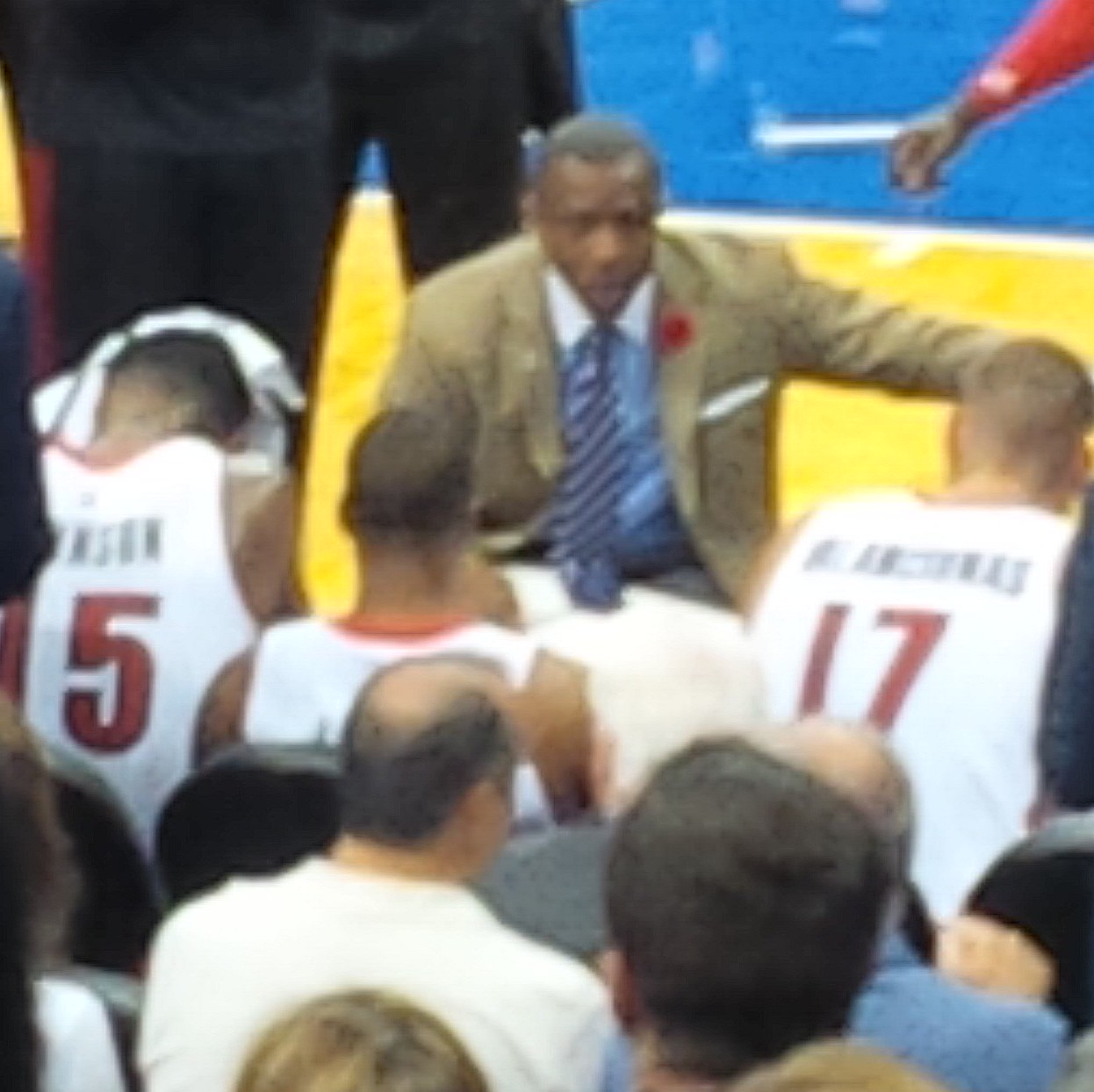
Casey during a timeout with the Toronto Raptors.

During the summers, Casey continued to work with the Japanese national team. In the summer of 1998 the team appeared in the FIBA World Championship basketball tournament, which would be the team's first appearance there in over 30 years.

=== Return to the NBA ===
Casey left the Japanese Basketball League in 1994 after receiving an assistant coaching position for the Seattle SuperSonics. During his tenure in Seattle, the team won four division titles.

At the beginning of the 2005–06 NBA season, Casey landed his first job as head coach for the Minnesota Timberwolves, replacing Kevin McHale. Casey's overall record with the team was 53–69, and he was fired on January 23, 2007, after only a season and a half with the Timberwolves. At the time of his firing, the Timberwolves were 20–20, he was replaced by assistant coach Randy Wittman, who went 12–30 for the rest of the season.

During the 2008–09 NBA season, Casey served as an assistant coach for the Dallas Mavericks. During the 2009–10 NBA season, the Mavericks won a division title. In 2011, the Mavericks defeated the Miami Heat in the 2011 NBA Finals and won their first championship. LeBron James of the Heat would later admit that Casey's defensive schemes for Dallas helped make him improve his game even further after that series.

=== Toronto Raptors ===
In early June 2011, the Toronto Raptors decided not to pick up the option on Jay Triano's contract. Casey was named the new Raptors head coach on June 21 and would run through until the 2013–14 season.

Casey's first two seasons with the Raptors involved little to no success. The team exceeded expectations in the first season and underachieved in the second. The team failed to make the playoffs both seasons. During his third season with the team, it managed to set a new team record for most wins in a season, an Atlantic Division Championship, and its first playoff appearance in six years.

On May 6, 2014, a day after being eliminated from the playoffs, Casey and the Raptors agreed to a three-year contract extension.

On November 1, 2015, Casey surpassed Sam Mitchell's franchise record for wins, getting his 157th against Milwaukee Bucks with the score of 106–87.

On March 18, 2016, Casey became the first Raptors head coach to reach 200 wins with the franchise in a 101–94 win over the Indiana Pacers, and twelve days later, in a 105–97 win over the Atlanta Hawks, he coached the Raptors to its first 50-win season in franchise history.

On May 1, 2016, Casey coached the Raptors to their first Game 7 victory in franchise history with an 89–84 win over the Indiana Pacers in the first round of the 2016 NBA Playoffs and on May 15, he coached the Raptors to their first appearance in the Eastern Conference finals in franchise history with a 116–89 victory over the Miami Heat in the second round of the playoffs, where they fell to the eventual NBA champions Cleveland Cavaliers in six games. On June 7, he agreed with the Raptors to a contract extension.

On January 28, 2018, Casey became the first coach in Raptors history to be selected for the NBA All-Star Game. On February 11, 2018, he celebrated his 300th win as a coach for the Raptors. Casey's Raptors set franchise records for wins and points in the regular season as they finished first in the Eastern Conference. In the playoffs, the Raptors defeated the Washington Wizards in six games and were then swept in four games by the Cleveland Cavaliers led by LeBron James. Casey's conservative coaching structure and system was credited with developing the Raptors' younger players, however it did not fare well in the playoffs against the Tyronn Lue-coached Cavaliers who were flexible rather than being consistent. On May 11, Casey was fired as the Raptors' head coach, shortly after being named as NBCA Coach of the Year. He was named the NBA Coach of the Year at the 2018 NBA Awards.

=== Detroit Pistons ===
On June 11, 2018, Casey was named the head coach for the Detroit Pistons, agreeing to a five-year deal. On November 14, 2018, Casey returned to Scotiabank Arena for the first time since being fired by the Toronto Raptors, coaching the Pistons to a 106–104 win over his former team. In the playoffs, the Pistons were swept in the first round by the Milwaukee Bucks, while Casey's former team, Raptors, won the NBA championship against the Golden State Warriors. On May 12, 2021, the Pistons signed Casey to a contract extension through the 2024 season. On April 10, 2023, Casey stepped down as the head coach following the conclusion of 2022–23 season. During five seasons as coach for the Pistons, he led the team to a regular season record of 121–262 (.316). He transitioned to the Pistons' front office.

== Head coaching record ==
Legend
Regular season	G	Games coached	W	Games won	L	Games lost	W–L %	Win–loss %
Playoffs	PG	Playoff games	PW	Playoff wins	PL	Playoff losses	PW–L %	Playoff win–loss %

Team	Year	G	W	L	W–L%	Finish	PG	PW	PL	PW–L%	Result
Minnesota	2005–06	82	33	49	.402	3rd in Northwest	—	—	—	—	Missed playoffs
Minnesota	2006–07	40	20	20	.500	(fired)	—	—	—	—	—
Toronto	2011–12	66	23	43	.348	4th in Atlantic	—	—	—	—	Missed playoffs
Toronto	2012–13	82	34	48	.415	5th in Atlantic	—	—	—	—	Missed playoffs
Toronto	2013–14	82	48	34	.585	1st in Atlantic	7	3	4	.429	Lost in First round
Toronto	2014–15	82	49	33	.598	1st in Atlantic	4	0	4	.000	Lost in First round
Toronto	2015–16	82	56	26	.683	1st in Atlantic	20	10	10	.500	Lost in Conference finals
Toronto	2016–17	82	51	31	.622	2nd in Atlantic	10	4	6	.400	Lost in Conference semifinals
Toronto	2017–18	82	59	23	.720	1st in Atlantic	10	4	6	.400	Lost in Conference semifinals
Detroit	2018–19	82	41	41	.500	3rd in Central	4	0	4	.000	Lost in First round
Detroit	2019–20	66	20	46	.303	4th in Central	—	—	—	—	Missed playoffs
Detroit	2020–21	72	20	52	.278	5th in Central	—	—	—	—	Missed playoffs
Detroit	2021–22	82	23	59	.280	5th in Central	—	—	—	—	Missed playoffs
Detroit	2022–23	82	17	65	.207	5th in Central	—	—	—	—	Missed playoffs
Career		1,064	494	570	.464		55	21	34	.382	

== Personal life ==
Casey and his family have a home in Seattle, Washington. During the summers, Casey likes to travel to Japan to help with basketball camps and coaching clinics.
