= Clarksville High School (Tennessee) =

Location
- 151 Richview Rd; Clarksville, Tennessee 37043; United States; 36.5157°N 87.2774°W

Information
- Type: Public
- Founded: 1906
- School district: Clarksville-Montgomery County School System
- Principal: Erin Hedrick
- Teaching staff: 70.10 (on an FTE basis)
- Grades: 9-12
- Enrollment: 1,530 (2026-27)
- Student to teacher ratio: 19.73
- Colors: Purple and Gold
- Athletics: Tennessee Secondary School Athletic Association
- Nickname: Wildcats
- Website: clarksvillehigh.cmcss.net

Clarksville High School is an urban public high school located in Clarksville in Montgomery County, Tennessee. It is part of the Clarksville-Montgomery County School System.

== History ==
The original building was built in 1906, but the school moved to the current building in 1968.

== Additional school information ==
Clarksville High School holds the CMCSS Business Academy which provides an open enrollment option for entering freshmen in Montgomery County. Its mascot is Wiley the Wildcat. The school colors are purple and gold, and the sports teams wear purple and gold with some black. Athletics are part of the TSSAA. The School meets expectations for the standardized tests and ACT's.

== Athletics ==
Clarksville High School Football is led by Head Coach Isaac Shelby, whose accomplishments include a 45-13 record against teams in the city. Under Shelby, the team has made the playoffs ten out of twelve years at Clarksville High, with a 10-9 playoff record. Shelby has coached 13 players who have gone on to play in the Tennessee All-Star Game and 62 players who have signed to play college football, 2 of which have gone on to play in the NFL. Coach Shelby also holds the record for the most winningest coach in school history at Clarksville Northeast High School, which he joined in 2008. He left Northeast to coach for Clarksville High School in 2014.

Only 3 years after hiring Andrew Gaskill as director, the Clarksville Highschool Marching Band competed in the 2024 Bands of America Grand National Championships in Indianapolis, Indiana, achieving a historic milestone and being one of only five bands from Tennessee to compete on that national stage.

In its second year, the 2021 Lady Cats Girls Wrestling Team had two State Champions Ella-Lina Gonzalez and Brielle Bissonette. The team won the TSSAA State Duals and placed second in the Girls Traditional State Tournament. The girls' soccer team won the state title in 2014 and 2016 with a 2nd place trophy in 2015. The women's golf team won the state title in 2016, their third.

Girls' Golf has also won multiple state titles as well.

== Notable alumni ==
- Donny Everett, former College Baseball player at Vanderbilt
- Galen Fott, director and animator
- Harry Galbreath, former NFL Football player
- Brock Gillespie, basketball player
- Bashaara Graves, WNBA basketball player
- Ryne Harper, MLB pitcher
- Trenton Hassell, former NBA basketball player
- Shawn Marion, former NBA basketball player
- Wes Parsons, MLB pitcher
- Robert Penn Warren, poet and novelist
- Ted Young, former JBL basketball player for the Akita Isuzu Motors
