= Kiyomi Sato =

Japanese basketball coach

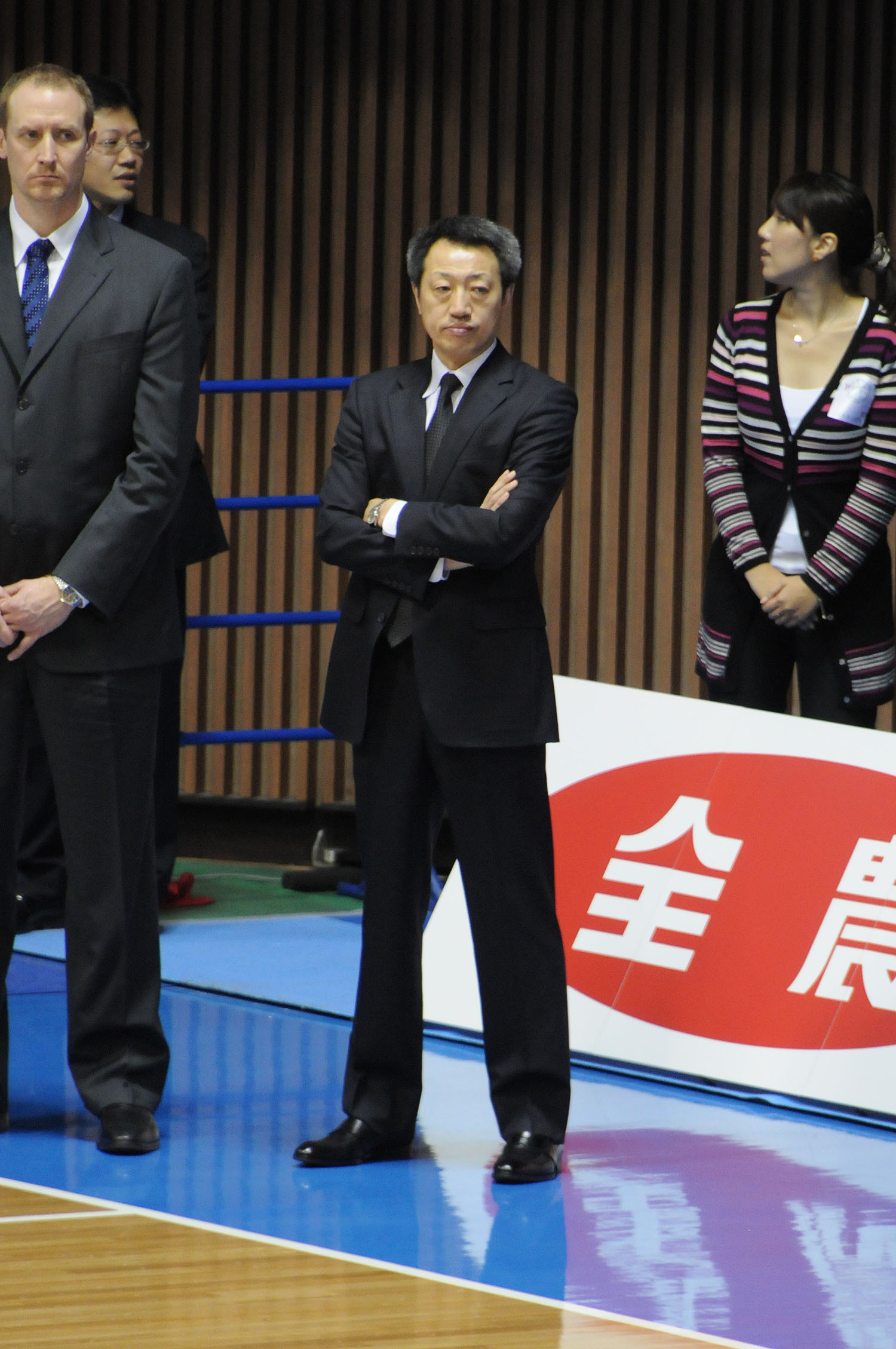

JX-Eneos Sunflowers
- Position: Head coach

Personal information
- Born: May 21, 1962 (age 64) Omori, Akita
- Listed height: 5 ft 9 in (1.75 m)
- Listed weight: 143 lb (65 kg)

Career information
- High school: Noshiro Technical (Noshiro, Akita)
- College: Nihon University
- Coaching career: 1993–present

Career history

Playing
- 1985-1993: Nippon Mining

Coaching
- 1993-1994: Japan Energy Griffins (asst)
- 1994-1995: Nihon University (asst)
- 1998-1999: Japan National(asst)
- 1998-2008: Tokoha University
- 2008-2012: Japan Energy Sunflowers(asst)
- 2012-present: JX-Eneos Sunflowers

Career highlights
- As player: 2x Japanese College Champions; 2x Japanese High School Champions; As coach: 4x WJBL Champions

Kiyomi Sato (佐藤 清美, Satō Kiyomi; born May 26, 1962) is a current basketball head coach for JX-Eneos Sunflowers in Japan and the former head coach for Tokoha University.

== Head coaching record ==
Legend
Regular season	G	Games coached	W	Games won	L	Games lost	W–L %	Win–loss %
Playoffs	PG	Playoff games	PW	Playoff wins	PL	Playoff losses	PW–L %	Playoff win–loss %

Team	Year	G	W	L	W–L%	Finish	PG	PW	PL	PW–L%	Result
JX-Eneos Sunflowers	2012-2013	29	29	0	1.000	1st	6	5	1	.833	Champions
JX-Eneos Sunflowers	2013-2014	33	30	3	.909	1st	5	5	0	1.000	Champions
JX-Eneos Sunflowers	2014-2015	30	26	4	.867	1st	5	5	0	1.000	Champions
JX-Eneos Sunflowers	2015-2016	24	20	4	.833	1st	6	5	1	.833	Champions
