= Ted Young (basketball) =

American basketball player and coach

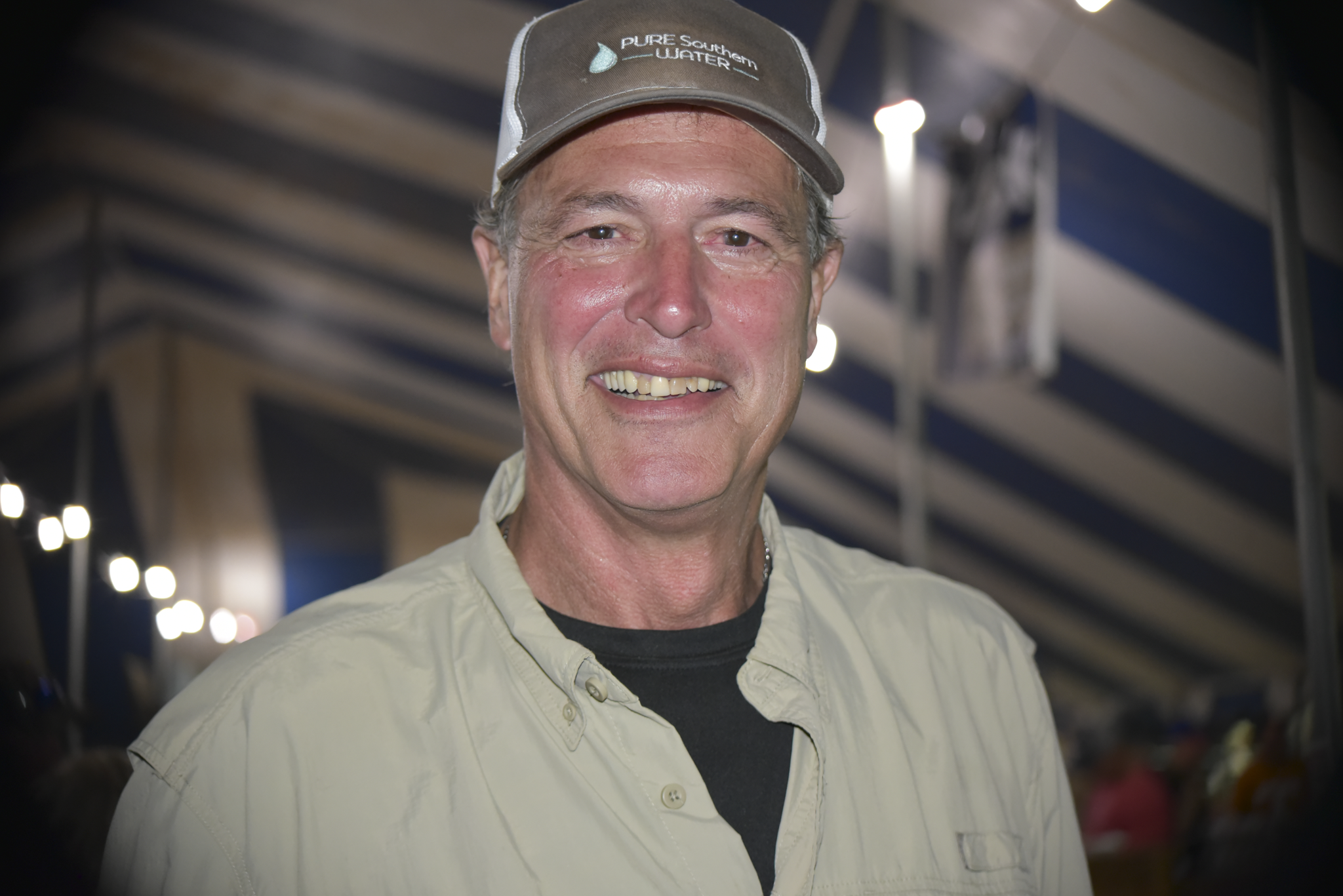

Personal information
- Born: November 12, 1960 (age 66) Clarksville, Tennessee, U.S.
- Listed height: 6 ft 8 in (2.03 m)
- Listed weight: 250 lb (113 kg)

Career information
- High school: Clarksville (Clarksville, Tennessee)
- College: Vanderbilt (1979–1983)
- NBA draft: 1983: undrafted
- Playing career: 1983–1992
- Coaching career: 1997–present

Career history

Playing
- 1983–1992: Akita Isuzu Motors/Isuzu Lynx/Giga Cats

Coaching
- 1997–present: Clarksville HS

Career highlights
- JBL MVP (1988); JBL Best5 (1988); JBL Scoring Leader (1985); 2x JBL Rebound Leader (1984, 1985); JBL Assist Leader (1988); JBL2 champion (1983); 2x Japanese Emperor's Cup champions (1984, 1988); JBL champion (1988)

Ted Young (born November 12, 1960) is an American former professional basketball player. He played college basketball at Vanderbilt, before playing professionally for the Akita Isuzu Motors/Isuzu Lynx/Giga Cats, of the Japan Basketball League.

== Coaching career ==
Young is the head boys basketball coach at Clarksville, and one of the most successful coaches in Tennessee Secondary School Athletic Association history.

== Personal ==
His son, Teal Young plays baseball.
