= Kimikazu Suzuki =

Japanese basketball player and coach

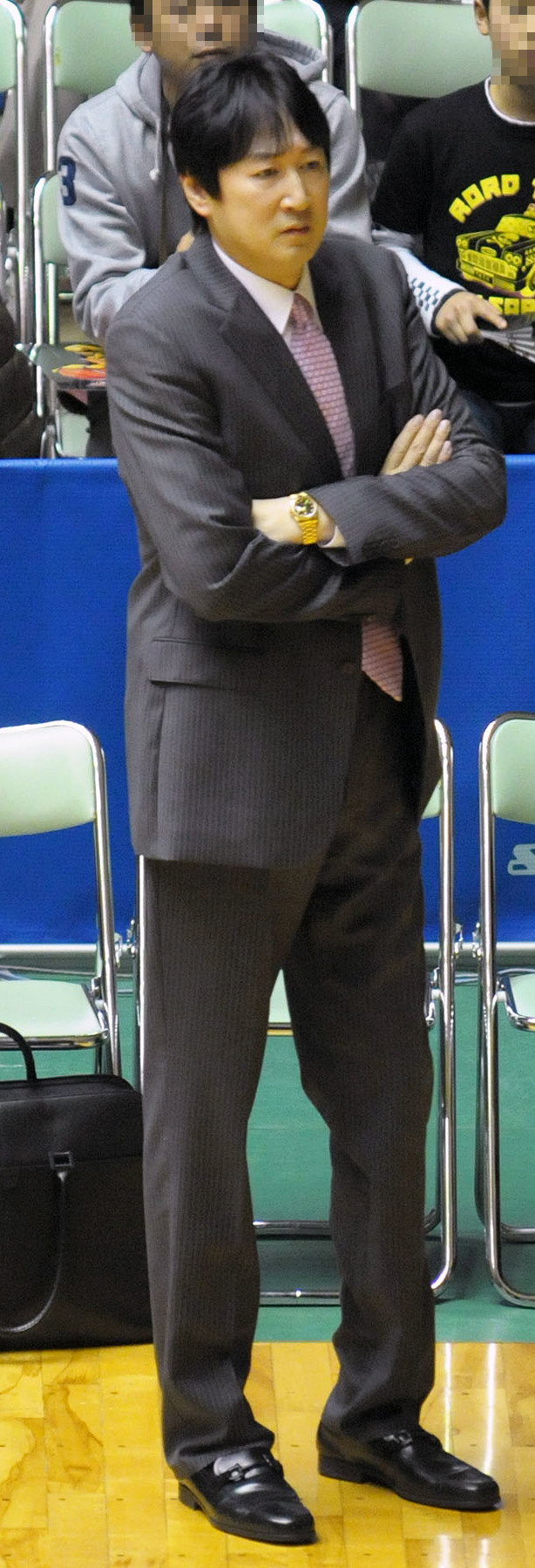

SeaHorses Mikawa
- Position: Head coach
- League: B.League

Personal information
- Born: September 26, 1959 (age 67) Shibuya, Tokyo
- Listed height: 6 ft 4 in (1.93 m)
- Listed weight: 192 lb (87 kg)

Career information
- High school: Akita Higashi Junior High School; Noshiro Technical (Noshiro, Akita)
- College: Hosei University
- Coaching career: 1988–2023

Career history

Playing
- 1982–1988: Nippon Mining

Coaching
- 1988–1995: Akita Keizaihoka University
- 1995–2023: Aisin SeaHorses Mikawa
- 2006–2007, 2012–2014: Japan

Career highlights
- 8x Japanese champions

Kimikazu Suzuki (鈴木貴美一, Suzuki Kimikazu) is a former Japanese basketball coach and player. He was most recently the head coach of SeaHorses Mikawa. Suzuki served as head coach of the Japan national basketball team two times. His first term was from 2006 to 2007, while his second one was from May 2012 until 2014.

After Mikawa finished fifth in their division with a 27–33 record, Suzuki announced in May 2023 that he would be stepping down as the team's head coach.

== Head coaching record ==
Legend
Regular season	G	Games coached	W	Games won	L	Games lost	W–L %	Win–loss %
Playoffs	PG	Playoff games	PW	Playoff wins	PL	Playoff losses	PW–L %	Playoff win–loss %

Team	Year	G	W	L	W–L%	Finish	PG	PW	PL	PW–L%	Result
Aisin	1994	15	11	4	.733	2nd	-	-	-	–	Runners-up
Aisin	1995	16	4	12	.250	10th	-	-	-	–	-
Aisin	1996	16	5	11	.313	11th	-	-	-	–	-
Aisin	1997	16	5	11	.313	10th	-	-	-	–	-
Aisin	1998	16	9	7	.563	7th	-	-	-	–	-
Aisin	1999	16	7	9	.438	3rd	-	-	-	–	4th
Aisin	2000	21	13	8	.619	3rd	2	0	2	.000	3rd
Aisin	2001	21	17	4	.810	1st	2	0	2	.000	3rd
Aisin	2002	21	18	3	.857	1st	4	4	0	1.000	JBL Champions
Aisin	2003	28	20	8	.714	1st	5	5	1	.833	JBL Champions
Aisin	2004	28	22	6	.786	1st	6	2	4	.333	Runners-up
Aisin	2005	26	11	15	.423	5th	-	-	-	–	5th
Aisin	2006	24	14	10	.583	3rd	2	0	2	.000	3rd
Aisin	2007-08	35	26	9	.743	1st	7	5	2	.714	JBL Champions
Aisin	2008-09	35	24	11	.686	1st	6	5	1	.833	JBL Champions
Aisin	2009-10	42	31	11	.738	1st	5	2	3	.400	Runners-up
Aisin	2010-11	36	26	10	.722	1st	-	-	-	–	-
Aisin	2011-12	42	31	11	.738	1st	7	3	4	.429	Runners-up
Aisin	2012-13	42	34	8	.810	1st	7	5	2	.714	JBL Champions
Aisin	2013-14	54	40	14	.741	2nd in Western	5	3	2	.600	4th
Aisin	2014-15	54	43	11	.796	1st in Western	8	7	1	.875	NBL Champions
Aisin	2015-16	53	35	18	.660	4th	9	6	3	.667	Runners-up
Mikawa	2016-17	60	46	14	.767	1st in Western	5	3	2	.600	Lost in 2nd round
Mikawa	2017-18	60	48	12	.800	1st in Central	4	2	2	.500	Lost in 2nd round
Mikawa	2018-19	60	31	29	.517	4th in Central	-	-	-	–	-
Mikawa	2019-20	41	18	23	.439	2nd in Central	-	-	-	–	-
