= Masahiro Ohara =

Japanese basketball player and coach

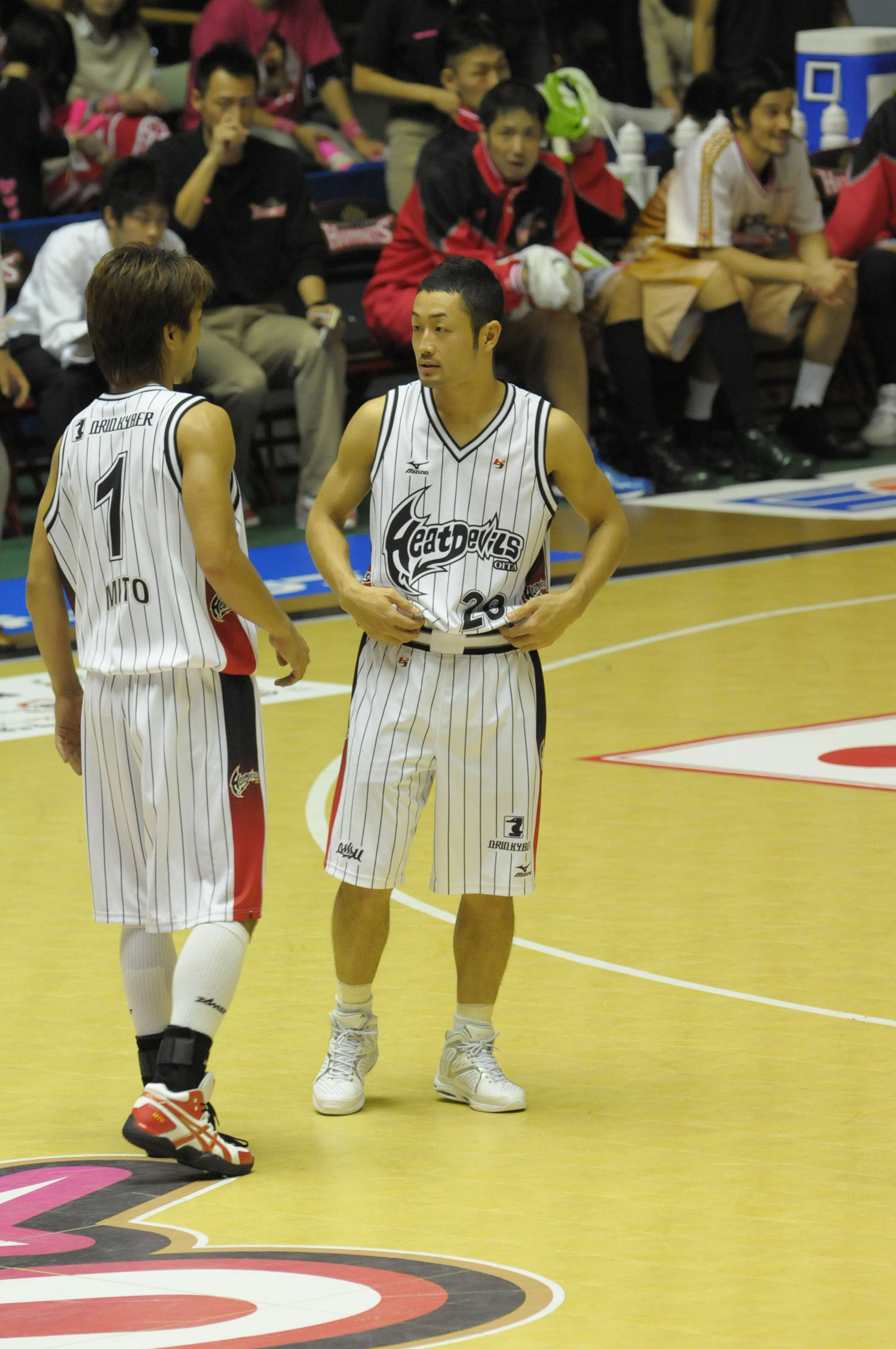
- Ohara in 2011

Personal information
- Born: April 3, 1982 (age 44) Chōfu, Tokyo
- Listed height: 5 ft 7 in (1.70 m)
- Listed weight: 148 lb (67 kg)

Career information
- High school: Tokyo University of Agriculture Daiichi (Setagaya, Tokyo)
- College: Tokyo University of Agriculture
- Position: Head coach
- Coaching career: 2013–present

Career history

Playing
- 2004-2006: Yokohama Giga Cats/Spirits
- 2006-2008: Chiba Pias Arrow Badgers
- 2008-2013: Oita Heat Devils
- 2014-2015: Renova Kagoshima

Coaching
- 2013-2015: Renova Kagoshima

Masahiro Ohara (小原匡博, Ohara Masahiro) is the former Head coach of the Renova Kagoshima in the Japanese NBDL.

== Head coaching record ==
Legend
Regular season	G	Games coached	W	Games won	L	Games lost	W–L %	Win–loss %
Playoffs	PG	Playoff games	PW	Playoff wins	PL	Playoff losses	PW–L %	Playoff win–loss %

Team	Year	G	W	L	W–L%	Finish	PG	PW	PL	PW–L%	Result
Renova Kagoshima	2013-14	32	11	21	.344	6th in NBDL	-	-	-	–	-
Renova Kagoshima	2014-15	32	5	27	.156	8th in NBDL	-	-	-	–	-
