= Howard Wright (basketball) =

American basketball player

Personal information
- Born: December 20, 1967 (age 58) San Diego, California, U.S.
- Listed height: 6 ft 8 in (2.03 m)
- Listed weight: 220 lb (100 kg)

Career information
- High school: Patrick Henry (San Diego, California)
- College: Stanford (1985–1989)
- NBA draft: 1989: undrafted
- Playing career: 1990–2000
- Position: Power forward
- Number: 41, 42, 34

Career history
- 1990: Atlanta Hawks
- 1990: Orlando Magic
- 1991: Dallas Mavericks
- 1991: Atlético Madrid Villalba
- 1991–1992: Reims Champagne Basket
- 1992: Tri-City Chinook
- 1992–1993: Auxilium Torino
- 1993: Orlando Magic
- 1993–1994: Andorra
- 1994–1995: Joventut Badalona
- 1995–1996: Murcia
- 1996–1998: Japan Energy Griffins
- 1998–2000: Toyota Motors Pacers

Career highlights
- 2× First-team All-Pac-10 (1988, 1989)
- Stats at NBA.com
- Stats at Basketball Reference

Howard Gregory Wright (born December 20, 1967) is an American former professional basketball player. Born in San Diego, California, he is a 6-foot-8-inch (203 cm) 220 pounds (100 kg) power forward and played collegiately at Stanford University from 1987 to 1989.

Wright played for the NBA's Dallas Mavericks, Atlanta Hawks, and Orlando Magic. He also played in the Continental Basketball Association for the Tri-City Chinook.
