= Japan Energy Griffins =

- Leagues: JBL
- Founded: 1937
- Folded: 1998
- History: Nippon Mining; Nikko Kyoseki
- Location: Tokyo
- Ownership: Japan Energy
- Championships: 1
Uniform	Away

The Japan Energy Griffins were a Japanese basketball team that played in the Japan Basketball League. They were based in Tokyo.

== Notable players ==
- Shigeaki Abe
- Yoshihiko Amano
- Mike Boyd (basketball, born 1972)
- Corey Gaines
- Alfred Grigsby
- Kenichi Imaizumi
- Takatoshi Ishibashi
- Akira Kodama
- Mototaka Kohama
- Koju Munakata
- Kunihiko Nakamura
- Setsuo Nara
- Tetsurō Noborisaka
- Kenji Okamura
- Yasukuni Ōshima
- Eric Reveno
- Hiroshi Saitō
- Satoshi Sakumoto
- Kiyomi Sato
- Masashi Shiga
- Shūtarō Shōji
- Alex Stivrins
- Kimikazu Suzuki
- Tomohide Utsumi
- Howard Wright

== Coaches ==
- John Patrick (basketball)
