= 1997 ABC Champions Cup =

1997 FIBA Asia Champions Cup
8th Asia Champions Cup

Tournament details
- Host country: Indonesia
- Dates: 18–25 July
- Teams: 10
- Venue: 1 (in 1 host city)

Final positions
- Champions: Hong Kong (1st title)

Tournament statistics
- MVP: (United States) Wayman Strickland

The ABC Champions Cup 1997 was the 8th staging of the ABC Champions Cup, the basketball club tournament of Asian Basketball Confederation. The tournament was held in Jakarta, Indonesia between July 18 and July 25, 1997.

== Preliminary round ==
=== Group A ===
Team	Pld	W	L	Pts	Tiebreaker
(Indonesia) Aspac	4	3	1	7	1–0
(Hong Kong) Regal	4	3	1	7	0–1
(Philippines) Tanduay Gold Rhum	4	2	2	6	
(Uzbekistan) MHSK Tashkent	4	1	3	5	1–0
(Malaysia) Petronas	4	1	3	5	0–1

July 18

Report

Tanduay Gold Rhum (Philippines)	90–76	(Uzbekistan) MHSK Tashkent
Scoring by half: 59−39, 31−37

Senayan Indoor Stadium, Jakarta

July 18

Aspac (Indonesia)	66–71	(Malaysia) Petronas

Senayan Indoor Stadium, Jakarta

July 19

Petronas (Malaysia)	vs.	(Hong Kong) Regal

Senayan Indoor Stadium, Jakarta

July 19

Report

MHSK Tashkent (Uzbekistan)	63–72	(Indonesia) Aspac
Scoring by half: 38−32, 31−40

Senayan Indoor Stadium, Jakarta

July 20

Regal (Hong Kong)	87–83	(Uzbekistan) MHSK Tashkent

Senayan Indoor Stadium, Jakarta

July 20
19:45

Report

Aspac (Indonesia)	75–63	(Philippines) Tanduay Gold Rhum
Scoring by half: 42−35, 33−28

Senayan Indoor Stadium, Jakarta

July 21

Report

Tanduay Gold Rhum (Philippines)	79–81	(Hong Kong) Regal

Senayan Indoor Stadium, Jakarta

July 21

MHSK Tashkent (Uzbekistan)	vs.	(Malaysia) Petronas

Senayan Indoor Stadium, Jakarta

July 22

Report

Petronas (Malaysia)	81–99	(Philippines) Tanduay Gold Rhum

Senayan Indoor Stadium, Jakarta

July 22

Regal (Hong Kong)	vs.	(Indonesia) Aspac

Senayan Indoor Stadium, Jakarta

=== Group B ===
Team	Pld	W	L	Pts
(Japan) Isuzu Giga Cats	4	4	0	8
(South Korea) Kia Motors	4	3	1	7
(China) PLA Hongshan	4	2	2	6
(Iran) Zob Ahan Isfahan	4	1	3	5
(Singapore) Tong Whye	4	0	4	4

July 20

Kia Motors (South Korea)	105–92	(Singapore) Tong Whye

Senayan Indoor Stadium, Jakarta

July 20

Isuzu Giga Cats (Japan)	79–59	(Iran) Zob Ahan Isfahan

Senayan Indoor Stadium, Jakarta

July 22

PLA Hongshan (China)	71–86	(Japan) Isuzu Giga Cats

Senayan Indoor Stadium, Jakarta

== Classification 5th–10th ==
=== 9th place ===
July 24

Petronas (Malaysia)	vs.	(Singapore) Tong Whye

Senayan Indoor Stadium, Jakarta

=== 7th place ===
July 24

MHSK Tashkent (Uzbekistan)	vs.	(Iran) Zob Ahan Isfahan

Senayan Indoor Stadium, Jakarta

=== 5th place ===
July 25

Tanduay Gold Rhum (Philippines)	94–89	(China) PLA Hongshan

Senayan Indoor Stadium, Jakarta

== Final round ==
Semifinals
July 24
(Indonesia) Aspac	65
(South Korea) Kia Motors	86
July 24
(Japan) Isuzu Giga Cats	66
(Hong Kong) Regal	70

Final
July 25
(South Korea) Kia Motors	59
(Hong Kong) Regal	64
3rd place
July 25
(Indonesia) Aspac	78
(Japan) Isuzu Giga Cats	52

=== Semifinals ===
July 24

Report

Aspac (Indonesia)	65–86	(South Korea) Kia Motors
Scoring by half: 30–46, 35–40

Senayan Indoor Stadium, Jakarta

July 24

Report

Isuzu Giga Cats (Japan)	66–70	(Hong Kong) Regal
Scoring by half: 32–28, 34–42

Senayan Indoor Stadium, Jakarta

=== 3rd place ===
July 25

Aspac (Indonesia)	78–52	(Japan) Isuzu Giga Cats

Senayan Indoor Stadium, Jakarta

=== Final ===
July 25

Kia Motors (South Korea)	59–64	(Hong Kong) Regal
Scoring by half: 26–32, 33–32

Senayan Indoor Stadium, Jakarta

== Final standing ==
Rank	Team	Record
1st place, gold medalist(s)	(Hong Kong) Regal	5–1
2nd place, silver medalist(s)	(South Korea) Kia Motors	4–2
3rd place, bronze medalist(s)	(Indonesia) Aspac	4–2
4	(Japan) Isuzu Giga Cats	4–2
5	(Philippines) Tanduay Gold Rhum	3–2
6	(China) PLA Hongshan	2–3
7	(Uzbekistan) MHSK Tashkent	2–3
8	(Iran) Zob Ahan Isfahan	1–4
9	(Malaysia) Petronas	2–3
10	(Singapore) Tong Whye	0–5

== Awards ==
- Most Valuable Player: (United States) Wayman Strickland (Regal)
