= Yoshihiko Amano =

Japanese basketball player (born 1971)

Personal information
- Born: May 18, 1974 (age 52) Komaki, Aichi
- Listed height: 6 ft 1 in (1.85 m)
- Listed weight: 176 lb (80 kg)

Career information
- High school: Aichi Institute of Technology Meiden
- College: Nippon University

Career history
- 1994-1998: Japan Energy Griffins
- 1998-1999: Aisin SeaHorses Mikawa
- 1999-2002: Bosch Blue Winds
- 2002-2003: Yokohama Giga Cats
- 2003-2005: Kagoshima Teachers
Medals
Men's basketball
Representing Japan
Summer Universiade
| Silver medal – second place | 1995 Fukuoka | Japan |

Yoshihiko Amano (born 18 May 1971) is a retired Japanese basketball player.
