= Takuya Kita =

Japanese basketball coach and former player

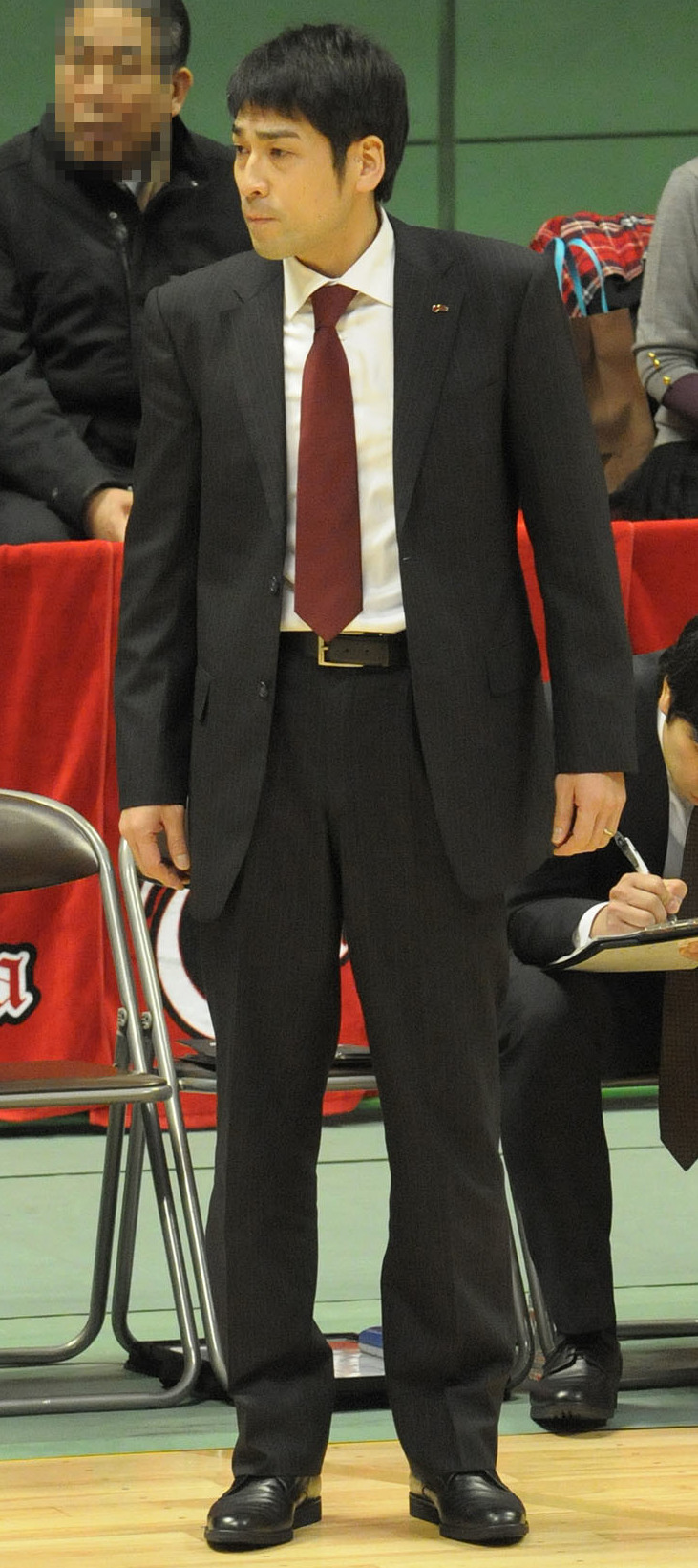

Kawasaki Brave Thunders
- Position: General manager
- League: B.League

Personal information
- Born: Hakui, Ishikawa
- Listed height: 6 ft 1 in (1.85 m)
- Listed weight: 176 lb (80 kg)

Career information
- High school: Hakui
- College: Takushoku University

Career history

Coaching
- 2009-2011: Kawasaki Brave Thunders (assistant)
- 2011-2019: Kawasaki Brave Thunders (head coach)
Medals
Men's basketball
Representing Japan
Summer Universiade
Silver medal – second place	1995 Fukuoka	Japan
William Jones Cup
Bronze medal – third place	2002 Taipei	Team

Takuya Kita (北 卓也, Kita Takuya; born 29 May 1972) is a professional Japanese basketball coach and former player.

== Head coaching record ==
Legend
Regular season	G	Games coached	W	Games won	L	Games lost	W–L %	Win–loss %
Playoffs	PG	Playoff games	PW	Playoff wins	PL	Playoff losses	PW–L %	Playoff win–loss %

Team	Year	G	W	L	W–L%	Finish	PG	PW	PL	PW–L%	Result
Toshiba	2011-12	42	8	34	.190	8th	-	-	-	–	-
Toshiba	2012-13	42	29	13	.690	3rd	8	4	4	.500	Runners-up
Toshiba	2013-14	54	46	8	.852	1st in Eastern	5	5	0	1.000	NBL Champions
Toshiba	2014-15	54	38	16	.704	4th in Eastern	2	0	2	.000	Lost in 1st round
Toshiba	2015-16	54	37	17	.685	3rd	10	7	3	.700	NBL Champions
Kawasaki	2016-17	60	49	11	.817	1st in Central	6	4	2	.667	Runners-up
Kawasaki	2017-18	60	41	19	.683	3rd in Eastern	3	1	2	.333	Lost in 1st round
Kawasaki	2018-19	60	40	20	.667	2nd in Central	2	0	2	.000	Lost in 1st round
