= Michael Takahashi =

Japanese-American basketball player

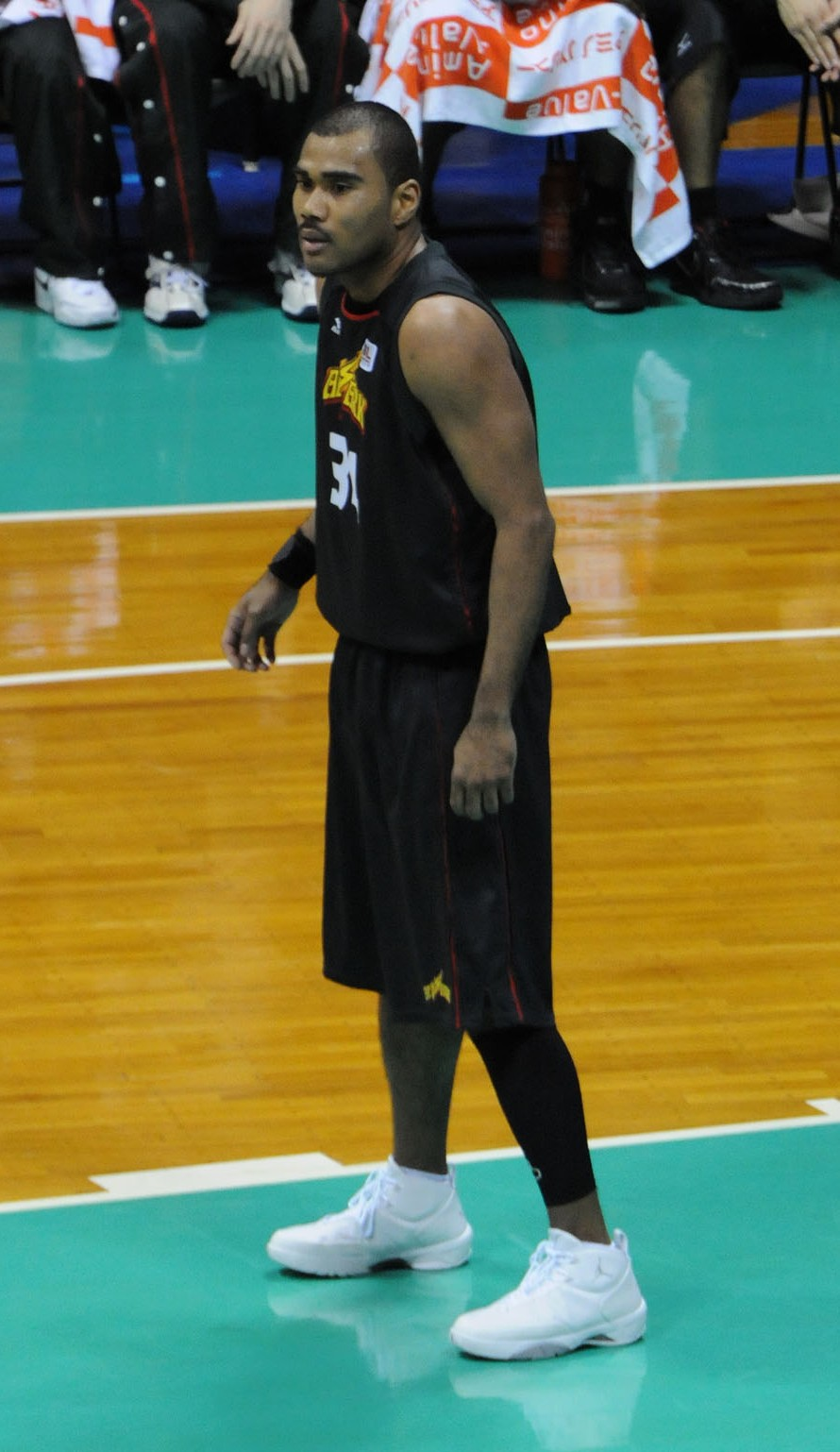

Personal information
- Born: September 5, 1974 (age 52) Kokubunji, Tokyo, Japan
- Listed height: 198 cm (6 ft 6 in)
- Listed weight: 92 kg (203 lb)

Career information
- College: Cal State Northridge (1993–1995)
- Playing career: 1995–2017
- Position: Small forward

Career history
- 1995–2002: Isuzu Motors / Isuzu Giga Cats
- 2003–2004: Niigata Albirex BB
- 2004–2014: Toyota Alvark
- 2014–2017: Aisin Seahorses

Career highlights
- 9× JBL champion (1996–1999, 2001, 2002, 2006, 2007, 2012); 7× JBL All-Star; 2× Asia All-Star Team (1998, 1999)
Medals
Men's basketball
Representing Japan
Summer Universiade
Silver medal – second place	1995 Fukuoka	Team competition
Asian Championship
Bronze medal – third place	1995 Seoul	Team
Silver medal – second place	1997 Riyadh	Team
FIBA Asia Champions Cup
Silver medal – second place	1996 Manila	Isuzu Lynx
William Jones Cup
Bronze medal – third place	2002 Taipei	Team

Michael Takahashi (高橋 マイケル, Takahashi Maikeru; formerly Michael Dorsey; born September 5, 1974), sometimes called Maikeru Takahashi, is a Japanese-born American professional basketball player who was considered in the mid-1990s to early 2000s one of the best players in Asia, a prolific scorer and rebounder, dominating the opposition through his athleticism and technique.

== Biography ==
Takahashi was born in Kokubunji, Tokyo to Ikuko Takahashi, a Japanese woman who now works as a computer programmer in Missouri and American actor Willie Dorsey who died sometime before 1995. Michael moved to the United States when he was 2 years old, settling in Los Angeles where he started playing basketball in high school. He is married and has two children. It was revealed that Takahashi has one younger brother, actor Jun Soejima.

== Professional career ==
After playing in college for Cal State Northridge he moved to Japan after playing there in the Universiade. On arrival he adopted his mother's surname of Takahashi to integrate.

Takahashi joined Isuzu Motors of the Japan Basketball League for the 1995–1996 season and quickly established himself in Japanese basketball, winning the league title and being awarded rookie of the year and the first of many All-Star designations. From then on he would be a vital element of the team that won all but two titles until it withdrew from the league due to financial difficulties in 2002.

Takahashi would later repeat that success at Toyota Alvark where he won the title a further three times before joining his current team the Aisin Seahorses. He won his ninth championship in his first year with the Aisin seahorses.

== National team ==
Takahashi became a mainstay on the Japanese national team starting with the 1995 Asian Championship where he helped the team win a bronze medal. They would do better at the next edition losing the final to South Korea which qualified them for the FIBA World Championship for the first time in 31 years.

At the 1998 tournament in Athens they were eliminated at the group stage, losing all their games although Takahashi finished as his team's best scorer with 16.4 PPG. After playing in the 1999 Asian Championship, the 2002 Asian Games and the 2003 Asian Championship (missing the 2001 edition due to club interference) without repeating earlier successes, his distinguished international career ended.
