= Yokohama Giga Spirits =

- Leagues: Japan Basketball League
- Founded: 1955
- Location: Akita, Akita (1955-1987); Yokohama, Kanagawa (1987-present)
- Head coach: Taisuke Koyama
- Website: www.team-web.jp/gigaspirit/index.php

The Yokohama Giga Spirits are a Japanese corporate basketball team based in Yokohama, Kanagawa.

== History ==
=== Akita Isuzu Motors 1955-1987 ===
Akita Isuzu Motors
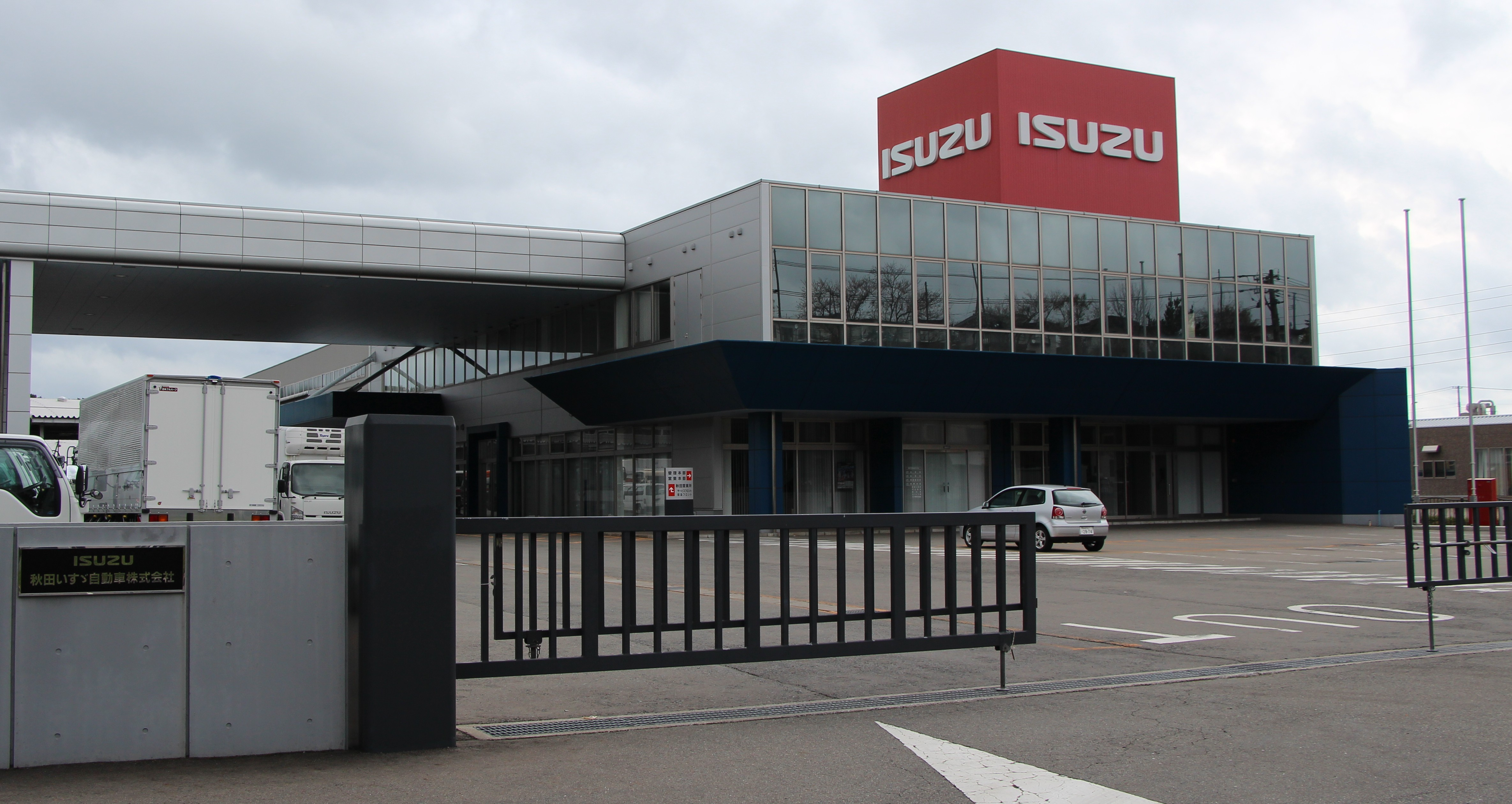
- Leagues: JBL2, JBL
- Founded: 1955
- Arena: Akita Prefectural Gymnasium
- Location: Akita, Akita
- President: Shozaburo Makinae
- Head coach: Mototaka Kohama
- Championships: 1983 (2nd Division)

Akita Isuzu Motors basketball team was founded by Shozaburo Makinae in 1955. Makinae currently serves as a director and corporate adviser for the Akita Northern Happinets of B.League. They practiced at Sannoh Junior High School gymnasium in 1960's and 1970's.

==== Head coaches ====
- Mototaka Kohama
- Shiro Yoshii
- Shigeyoshi Kasahara
- Hyokichi Tsuji V

==== Notable players ====
- Vince Brookins -Louisville vs Iowa
- Jack Givens(JBL2 MVP, Best5, Scoring Leader)
- Derrick Hord - Drafted in the third round of the NBA draft by the Cleveland Cavaliers - Louisville vs Kentucky 1983
- Mitsuhiko Kato
- Hirohide Matsuoka
- Kazuo Nakamura
- Taku Umetsu
- Lavon Williams (JBL2 Best5) -Denver, Colorado, Drafted in the fifth round of the NBA draft by the Cleveland Cavaliers - 1980 UK @ LSU 2/24, Wood Carvings
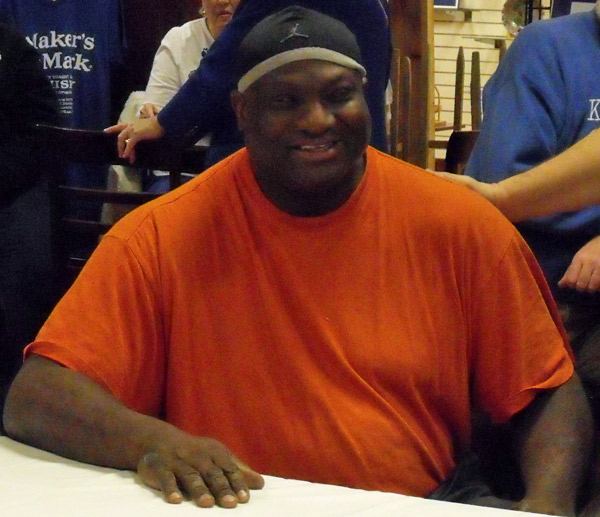
  Lavon Williams in 2013
- Ted Young (JBL MVP, Best5, 1988)

==== Honors and titles ====
JBL2

- Champions (1): 1983
- Runners-up (1): 1982

Emperor's Cup

- Champions (1): 1984
- Runners-up (1): 1986
- 3rd place (1): 1987

Japan Industrial and Commercial Basketball Federation Championships

- Runners-up (1): 1981

National Sports Festival of Japan

- Champions (2):

=== Isuzu Motors Lynx/Giga Cats 1987-2002 ===
Isuzu Motors Lynx/Giga Cats
- Conference: JBL
- Founded: 1987
- Location: Yokohama, Kanagawa
- Head coach: Mototaka Kohama; Dwane Casey
- Championships: 1988, 1995,1996, 1997, 1998, 2000

The team moved to Yokohama, Kanagawa in 1987. The club enjoyed its golden age winning JBL championships 6 times. Isuzu shut down its basketball and baseball clubs in 2002.

==== Head coach ====
- Mototaka Kohama
- Dwane Casey (1992-94)

Due to the Emery scandal in 1989, Kohama and Casey were reunited.

==== Notable players ====
- Dan Bingenheimer - Highlights
- Dave Butler
- Casey Calvary
- Richard Coffey
- Anthony Cook (basketball)
- Lucius Davis (JBL MVP, 1998)
- Terry Dozier
- Toshihiro Goto
- Reggie Hanson
- Makoto Hasegawa (JBL Rookie of the year, 1994)
- Brian Hendrick - Cal vs Duke
- Mike Higgins
- Cedric Jenkins
- Makoto Minamiyama
- Hiroshi Nagano
- Ernest Nzigmasabo
- Julius Nwosu
- Tadaharu Ogawa
- Dale Roberts
- A.J. Rollins
- Yukihiro Sakka (JBL Rookie of the year, 1988)
- Kenichi Sako
- Satoshi Sakumoto
- Toru Shioya
- Anthony Smith
- Michael Takahashi - Highlights
- Kenny Walker (JBL Best5, 1996)
- Joe Wallace
- Wang Libin

==== Honors and titles ====
JBL

- Champions (6): 1988, 1995,1996, 1997, 1998, 2000
- Runners-up (2): 1999. 2001

Emperor's Cup

- Champions (5): 1994, 1996, 1998, 1999, 2001
- 3rd place (2): 1990, 2002

ABC Champions Cup

- Runners-up (1): 1996
- 4th place (1): 1997

ABA Club Championship

- Runners-up (1): 2001

=== Yokohama Giga Cats 2002-2005 ===
Kohama led the revamped Giga Cats, after Isuzu dropped sponsorship, as a club team until 2005.

==== Notable players ====
- Yoshihiko Amano
- Kenji Hilke
- Haruyuki Ishibashi
- Hirokazu Nema
- Masahiro Ohara
- Taku Saito

=== Yokohama Giga Spirits 2005-present ===
==== Notable players ====
- Minoru Kimura (basketball)
- Masahiro Ohara
