= Kenichi Sako =

Japanese former basketball player

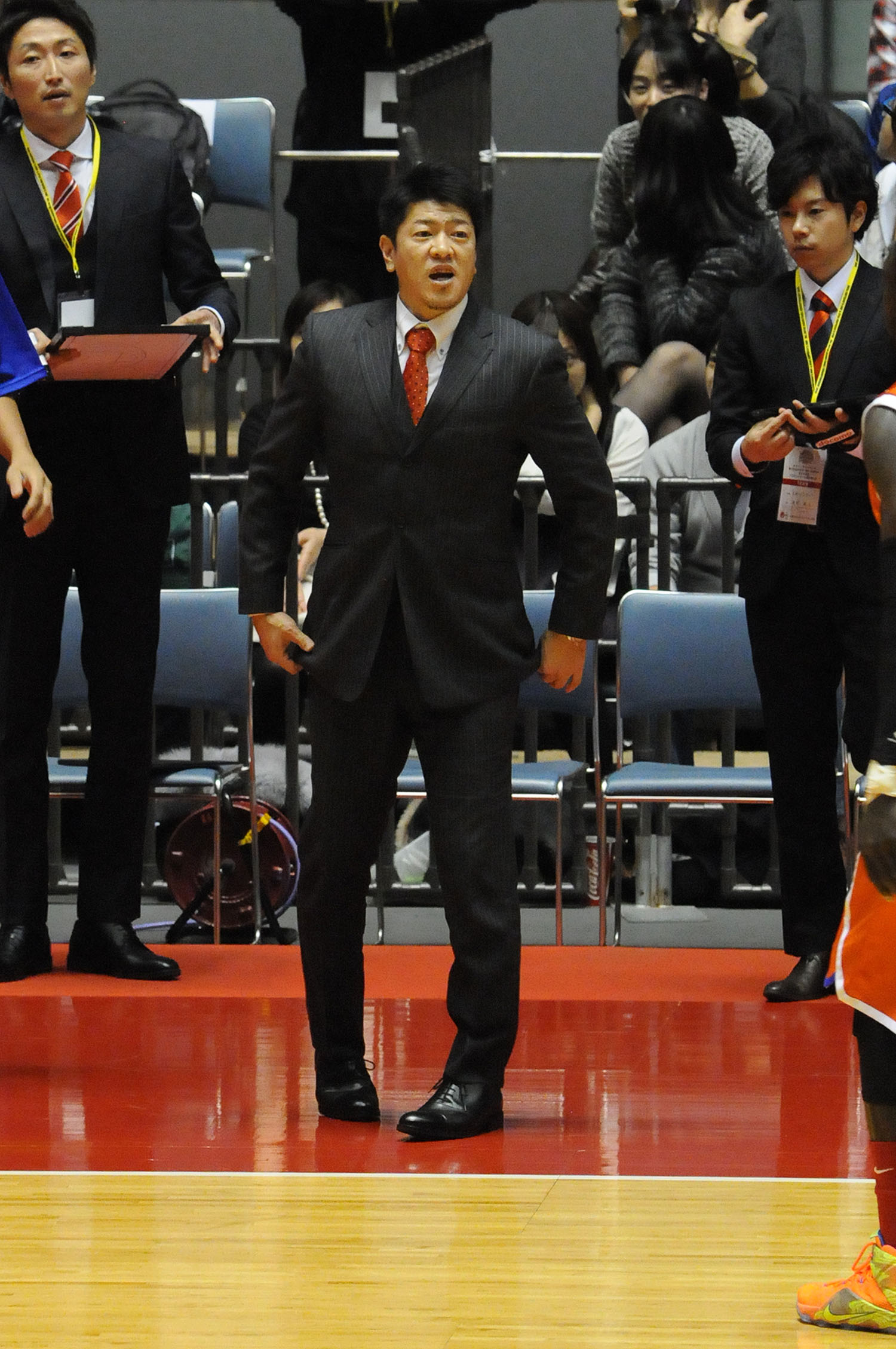
- Sako in 2015

Levanga Hokkaido
- Title: Head coach
- League: Japanese B.League

Personal information
- Born: July 17, 1970 (age 56) Iwakuni, Yamaguchi, Japan
- Listed height: 5 ft 11 in (1.80 m)
- Listed weight: 172 lb (78 kg)

Career information
- High school: Hokuriku
- College: Chuo University
- Playing career: 1993–2011
- Position: Point guard
- Coaching career: 2014–present

Career history

Playing
- 1993–2002: Isuzu Motors Giga Cats
- 2002–2011: Aisin SeaHorses Mikawa

Coaching
- 2014–2017: Hiroshima Dragonflies
- 2017–2021: Japan national basketball team (assistant)
- 2021–present: Levanga Hokkaido

Career highlights
- As player: 12× Emperor's Cup winner (1993, 1995, 1997, 1998, 2000, 2002–2004, 2007–2010); 9× JBL champion (1995–1998, 2000, 2002, 2003, 2007, 2008); 3× JBL MVP (1995, 1996, 2000); 9× JBL Best Five (1995–2003); 2× JBL 3point field goals leader (1997, 2001); 2× JBL assists leader (1993, 1994); Japanese Inter High School champion (1998)
- FIBA Hall of Fame
Medals
Men's basketball
Representing Japan
Asian Games
Bronze medal – third place	1994 Hiroshima	Japan
Summer Universiade
Silver medal – second place	1995 Fukuoka	Japan
FIBA Asia Champions Cup
Silver medal – second place	1996 Manila	Isuzu Lynx

Kenichi Sako (佐古 賢一, born 17 July 1970) is a Japanese former basketball player and current coach. Nicknamed "Mr. Basketball", Sako played as point guard and is widely regarded as one of the best Japanese players in history, having won twelve Emperor's Cup titles and nine JBL championships. Representing the Japan national team, Sako played at one FIBA World Cup in 1998, and won one silver and one bronze medal at the FIBA Asia Cup. He was enshrined into the FIBA Hall of Fame in 2020, becoming the first Japanese player to be inducted.

== Playing career ==
After leading his high school team to the national championship in 1998, Sako began his career with the Isuzu Motors Giga Cats, where he played for nine seasons. His second team were the SeaHorses Mikawa.

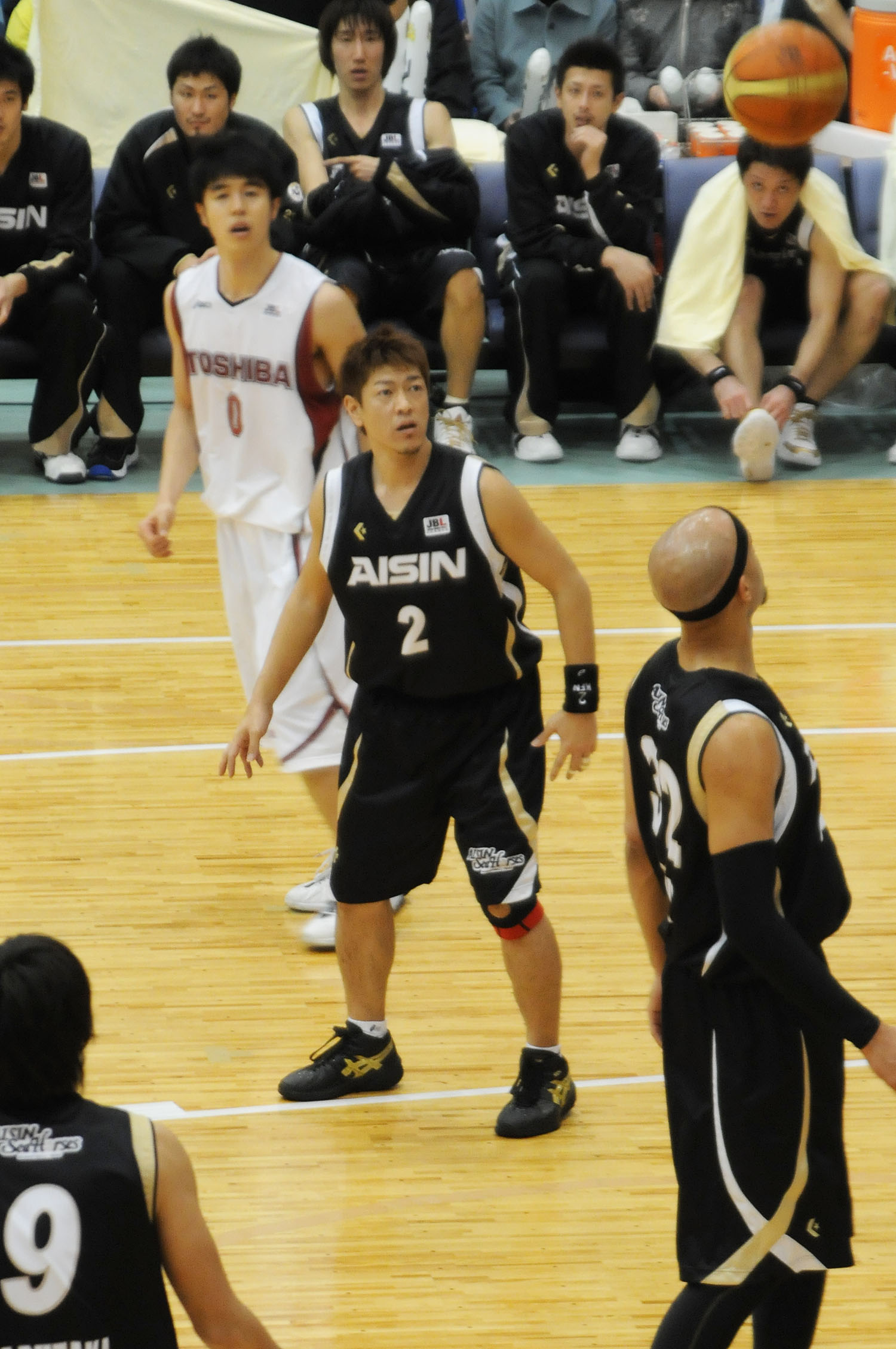
Sako with SeaHorses

== Head coaching record ==
Legend
Regular season	G	Games coached	W	Games won	L	Games lost	W–L %	Win–loss %
Playoffs	PG	Playoff games	PW	Playoff wins	PL	Playoff losses	PW–L %	Playoff win–loss %

Team	Year	G	W	L	W–L%	Finish	PG	PW	PL	PW–L%	Result
Hiroshima Dragonflies	2014-15	54	21	33	.389	3rd in Western	2	0	2	.000	5th
Hiroshima Dragonflies	2015-16	55	17	38	.309	9th	-	-	-	–	
Hiroshima Dragonflies	2016-17	60	46	14	.767	2nd in B2 Western	5	2	3	.400	3rd in B2
