= SeaHorses Mikawa =

Professional basketball team in Kariya, Aichi Prefecture, Japan

Seahorses Mikawa
- Leagues: B.League
- Founded: 1947; 79 years ago
- History: Aisin Seiki; Aisin Seiki Aisin SeaHorses; Aisin SeaHorses; Aisin SeaHorses Mikawa; SeaHorses Mikawa
- Arena: Wing Arena Kariya
- Capacity: 2,376
- Location: Kariya
- Head coach: Ryan Richman
- Championships: 6
- Website: go-seahorses.jp
Home	Away

Seahorses Mikawa is a Japanese professional basketball team based in Kariya, Aichi Prefecture and sponsored by Aisin. The team competes in the B.League Premier, the highest division of the B.League, as a member of the Western Conference. The team plays its home games at Wing Arena Kariya.

The team was founded in 1947. The team originally played in the National Basketball League. In July 2015 it was announced that the team will compete in the first division of the new Japan Professional Basketball League, which commenced in October 2016.

== History ==
Throughout the past decade, the team has been led by head coach Kimikazu Suzuki and naturalized big man J. R. Sakuragi, who led the SeaHorses to decades of success, including numerous titles in Japan's prime basketball league.

== Championships ==
- JBL Super League: 5

2003, 2004, 2008, 2009, 2013

- Challenge Cup: 1

2007

- Emperor's Cup: 2

2009, 2013

== Current roster ==
Note: Flags indicate national team eligibility at FIBA-sanctioned events. Players may hold other non-FIBA nationalities not displayed.

Seahorses Mikawa roster
Players
Coaches

Pos.	No.	Nat.	Name	Ht.	Age
F	1	(Japan)	Thomas Kennedy	2.01 m (6 ft 7 in)	39 – 17 May 1987
G	3	(Japan)	Shinsuke Kashiwagi	1.83 m (6 ft 0 in)	44 – 22 December 1981
F	5	(Japan)	Masayoshi Nimmo	1.98 m (6 ft 6 in)	20 – 23 September 2005
G	7	(Japan)	Satoshi Nagano	1.75 m (5 ft 9 in)	30 – 9 July 1995
F	10	(United States)	Jake Layman	2.06 m (6 ft 9 in)	32 – 7 March 1994
G	11	(Japan)	Yoshiaki Kubota	1.75 m (5 ft 9 in)	28 – 5 October 1997
G/F	13	(Japan)	Yutaro Suda	1.90 m (6 ft 3 in)	34 – 3 January 1992
G/F	18	(Japan)	Ryogo Sumino	1.94 m (6 ft 4 in)	30 – 14 June 1996
G	19	(Japan)	Yudai Nishida	1.88 m (6 ft 2 in)	27 – 13 March 1999
F	21	(Japan)	Kosuke Hashimoto	2.02 m (6 ft 8 in)	33 – 6 May 1993
G/F	24	(Japan)	Kenshin Urabe	2.06 m (6 ft 9 in)	31 – 5 April 1995
F	27	(Japan)	Kosuke Ishii	1.98 m (6 ft 6 in)	38 – 29 September 1987
PF	30	(United States)	Aaron White	2.06 m (6 ft 9 in)	33 – 10 September 1992
C	32	(Japan)	Avi Schafer	2.06 m (6 ft 9 in)	28 – 28 January 1998
F/C	54	(United States)	Davante Gardner	2.03 m (6 ft 8 in)	34 – 2 September 1991

Head coach

(United States) Ryan Richman

Assistant coach(es)

(Japan) Aiki Okubo
(United States) Dan Tacheny

Legend

- (C) Team captain
- Injured

- Roster
Updated: 1 March 2026

== Notable players ==
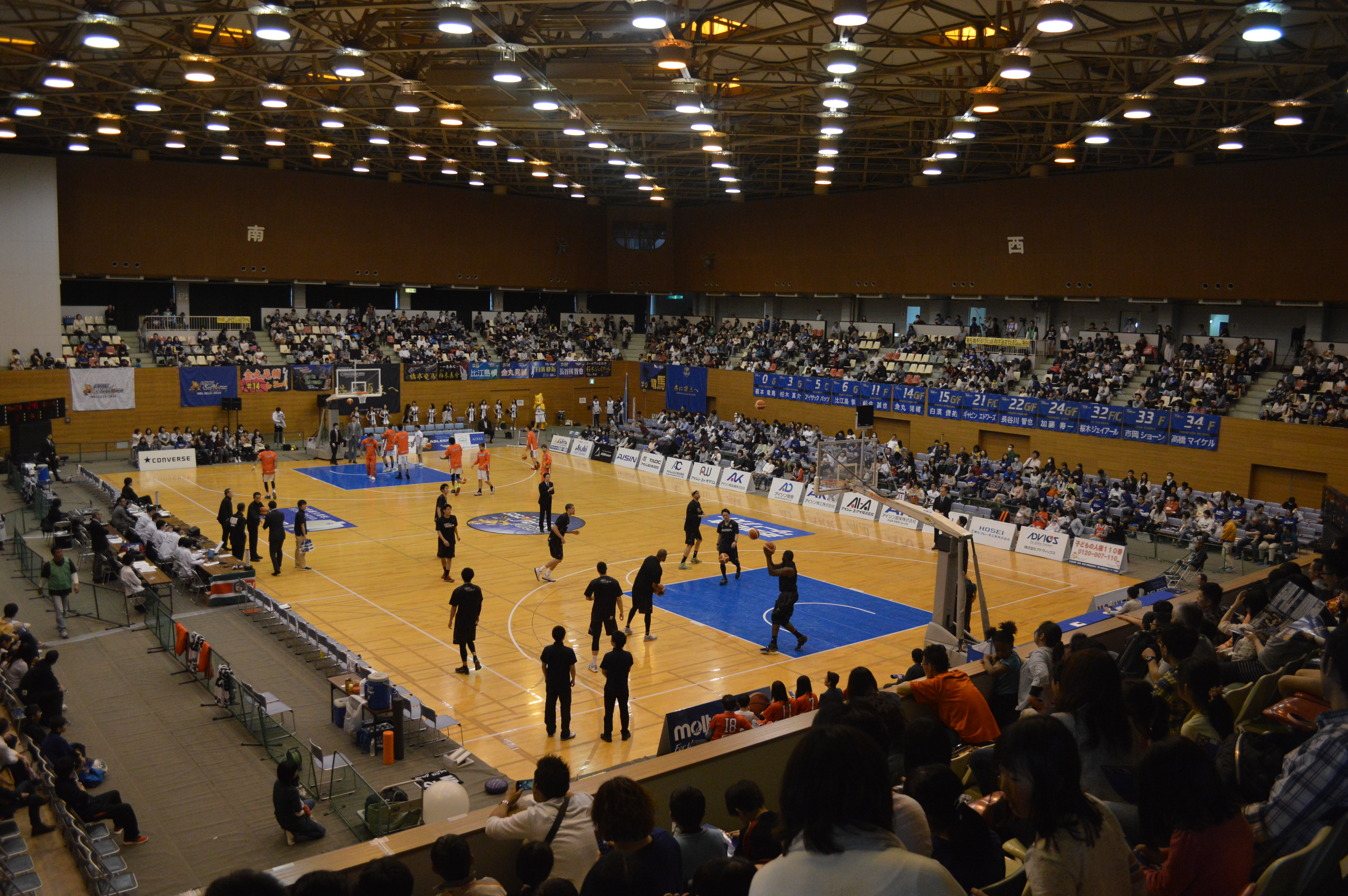
2015–16 season

To appear in this section a player must have either:

- Set a club record or won an individual award as a professional player.
- Played at least one official international match for his senior national team at any time. - Played at least one official regular season game in the NBA.

- (Japan) Yoshihiko Amano
- (Japan) Tomoo Amino
- (Sierra Leone) Alpha Bangura
- (United States) Junior Burrough
- (United States) Isaac Butts
- (United States) Jason Capel
- (United States) Robert Churchwell
- (United States) Ryvon Covile
- (United States) Gavin Edwards
- (United States) Marty Embry
- (United States) Ryan Forehan-Kelly
- (United States) Richie Frahm
- (Japan) Takatoshi Furukawa
- (United States) Josh Gross
- (Japan) Ryoma Hashimoto
- (Japan) Makoto Hiejima
- (United States) Ashante Johnson
- (Japan) Shinsuke Kashiwagi
- (Japan) Kunio Komiya
- (Japan) Keijuro Matsui
- (Japan) Eric McArthur
- (United States) Michael McDonald
- (Canada) Scott Morrison
- (United States) Daniel Orton
- (United States) Anthony Richardson
- (United States) Donzel Rush
- (Japan) Kenichi Sako
- (Japan) J. R. Sakuragi
- (Japan) Nobunaga Sato
- (United States) Daryan Selvy
- (Japan) Ryosuke Shirahama
- (Japan) Michael Takahashi
- (Japan) Kosuke Takeuchi
- (United States) Jarrod Uthoff
- (United States) Trevor Wilson
- (United States) David Young
- (Japan) Takeshi Yūki
- (Indonesia) Brandon Jawato

== Arenas ==
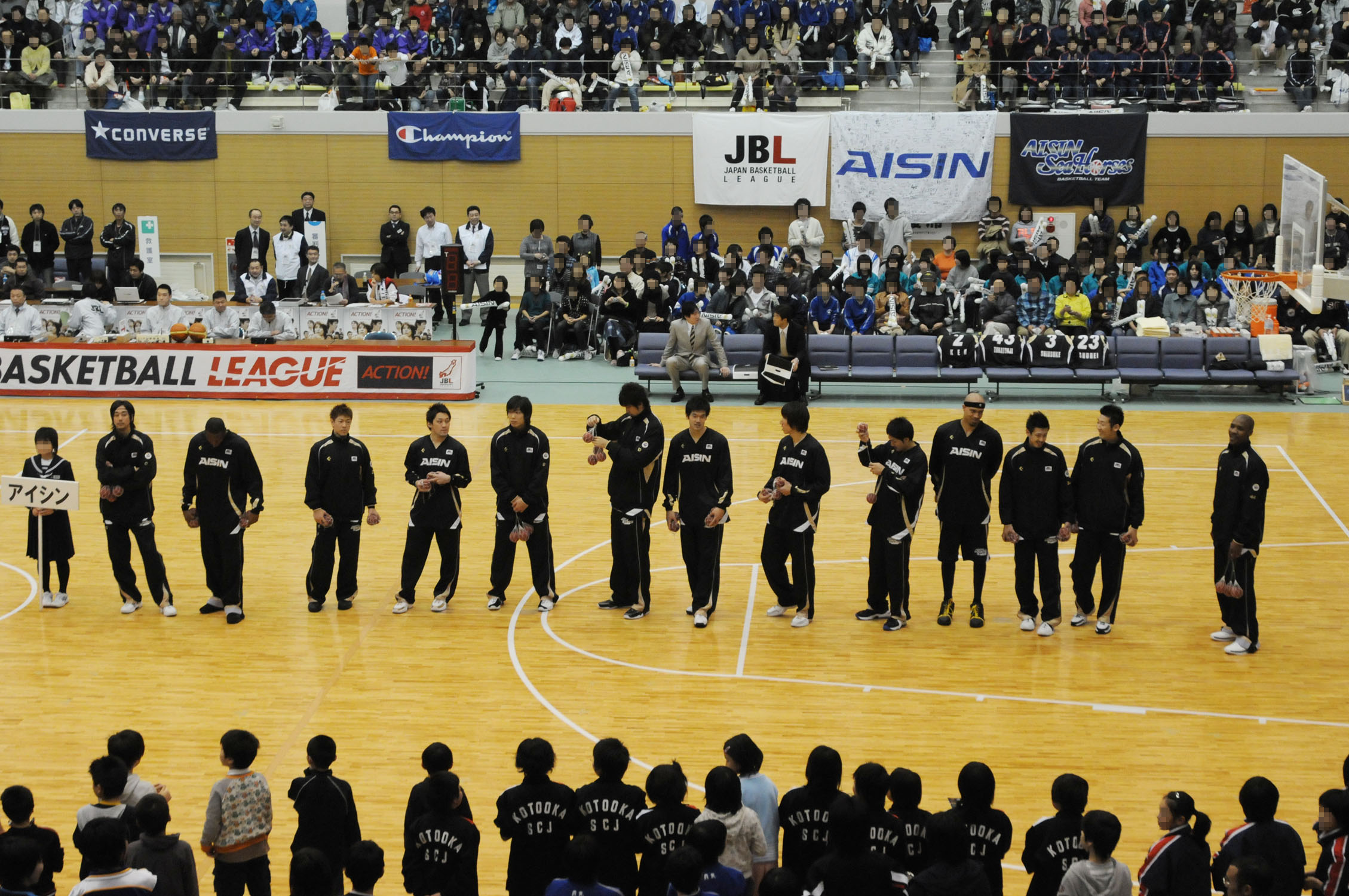
2008–09 season, Kotooka General Gymnasium

- Wing Arena Kariya
- Okazaki Central Park General Gymnasium
- Sky Hall Toyota

== Practice facilities ==
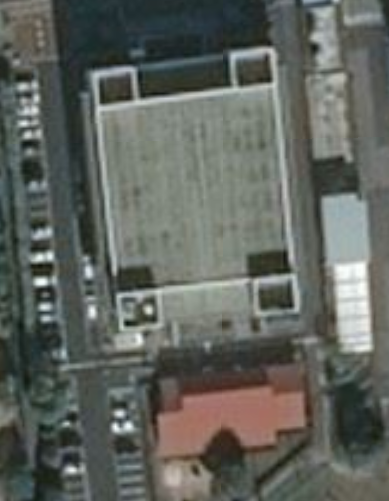
Aisin Seiki Gymnasium

- Aisin Seiki Gymnasium
