= Mototaka Kohama =

Japanese basketball coach

Personal information
- Born: October 17, 1932 Tokyo
- Died: 12 January 2017 (aged 84) Minato, Tokyo, Japan

Career information
- High school: Sumida Technical HS (Tokyo, Japan)
- Position: Head coach

Career history

Playing
- 1951-1958: Nippon Mining

Coaching
- ?: Showa Gakuin HS
- ?: Yasuda Life
- ?: Hitachi Totsuka Leopard
- 1977: Hosei University
- 1979: Japan National
- 1984-1989: Japan
- 1996-2000: Japan
- 1982-1992: Akita Isuzu Motors/Isuzu Motors Lynx
- 1994-2005: Isuzu Motors Lynx/Giga Cats/Yokohama Giga Cats
- 2007-2017: Ikai Red Chimps

Career highlights
- As player: Japanese High School MVP; As coach: Japanese college champion (1977); JBL2 champion (1983); 6x Emperor's Cup champions (1984, 1994, 1996, 1998, 1999, 2001); 6x JBL champions (1988, 1995,1996, 1997, 1998, 2000)

Mototaka Kohama (小浜元孝, Kohama Mototaka) was a Japanese basketball Head coach for the Akita Isuzu Motors, Isuzu Motors Lynx/Giga Cats and Yokohama Giga Cats. He was known as the “Godfather of Japanese basketball,” and served as head coach of the Japan national basketball team three times. Growing up in Akita during WWII as a young boy, he was told to stop playing basketball because it was an American sport. The pioneer studied basketball coaching at the University of Kentucky.
