= Makoto Minamiyama =

Japanese basketball player

Personal information
- Born: March 11, 1973 (age 53) Kanazawa-ku, Yokohama
- Listed height: 6 ft 0 in (1.83 m)
- Listed weight: 183 lb (83 kg)

Career information
- High school: Shonan Institute of Technology High School
- College: Hosei University

Career history
- 1995–2000: Isuzu Motors
Medals
Men's basketball
Representing Japan
Summer Universiade
Silver medal – second place	1995 Fukuoka	Japan
FIBA Asia Champions Cup
Silver medal – second place	1996 Manila	Isuzu Lynx

Makoto Minamiyama (南山 真, Minamiyama Makoto; born 11 March 1973) is a former Japanese basketball player.
