= Kawasaki Brave Thunders =

Professional basketball team in Kawasaki, Kanagawa Prefecture, Japan

Coordinates: 35.549298°N 139.688032°E

- Leagues: B.League
- Founded: 1950; 76 years ago
- History: Toshiba Red Thunders; Toshiba Brave Thunders; Toshiba Brave Thunders Kanagawa; Toshiba Kawasaki Brave Thunders; Kawasaki Brave Thunders
- Arena: Todoroki Arena
- Capacity: 6,500
- Location: Kawasaki, Kanagawa, Japan
- Head coach: Ronen Ginzburg
- Ownership: DeNA
- Championships: 4
- Retired numbers: 3 (8, 40, 51)
- Website: Official website
Home	Away

The Kawasaki Brave Thunders are a Japanese professional basketball team located in Kawasaki, Kanagawa Prefecture. The team competes in the highest division of basketball in Japan, the B.League, as a member of the Eastern Conference. The team plays its home games at Todoroki Arena. The team was the 2016 Champion of the now dissolved Japanese National Basketball League.

== Roster ==
Note: Flags indicate national team eligibility at FIBA-sanctioned events. Players may hold other non-FIBA nationalities not displayed.

Kawasaki Brave Thunders roster
Players
Coaches

Pos.	No.	Nat.	Name	Ht.	Age
G	0	(Japan)	Yuma Fujii	1.78 m (5 ft 10 in)	34 – 23 December 1991
F	1	(Japan)	Hirohide Araya	2.03 m (6 ft 8 in)	27 – 5 December 1998
G	3	(Japan)	Shun Matsuyama	1.76 m (5 ft 9 in)	29 – 27 September 1996
PF	4	(United States)	Jaedon LeDee	2.02 m (6 ft 8 in)	27 – 25 July 1999
SF	5	(United States)	Matt Bonds	1.96 m (6 ft 5 in)	30 – 6 November 1995
G	7	(Japan)	Ryusei Shinoyama	1.78 m (5 ft 10 in)	38 – 20 July 1988
F	11	(Japan)	Keisuke Masuda	1.94 m (6 ft 4 in)	28 – 22 January 1998
G	12	(Japan)	Reiya Nozaki	1.85 m (6 ft 1 in)	31 – 8 May 1995
F	18	(Japan)	Yuya Kamata	1.97 m (6 ft 6 in)	36 – 11 May 1990
G	21	(Japan)	Yuto Nohmi	1.82 m (6 ft 0 in)	29 – 10 April 1997
SF	33	(Japan)	Takumi Hasegawa	1.91 m (6 ft 3 in)	37 – 21 July 1989
G/F	37	(Japan)	Ryo Iida	1.85 m (6 ft 1 in)	31 – 11 April 1995
C	53	(United States)	Alex Kirk	2.11 m (6 ft 11 in)	34 – 14 November 1991

Head coach

- (Japan) Dai Oketani

Assistant coach(es)

- (Japan) Geoffrey Katsuhisa
- (Japan) Kensuke Hosaka

Legend

- (C) Team captain
- Injured

- Roster
Updated: June 1, 2026

== Notable players ==
Former logo

To appear in this section a player must have either:

- Set a club record or won an individual award as a professional player.
- Played at least one official international match for his senior national team.

- (United States) Lou Amundson
- (United States) Stephen Bardo
- (United States) Cedric Bozeman
- (United States) Brian Butch
- (United States) Peter Cornell
- (Senegal) Mamadou Diouf
- (Japan) Nick Fazekas
- (United States) Anthony Frederick
- (United States) Randy Holcomb
- (United States) Tom Hovasse
- (Japan) Takumi Ishizaki
- (Japan) Reina Itakura
- (Japan) Shunsuke Itō
- (Japan) Takuya Kita
- (United States) Tom Kleinschmidt
- (United States) Chris Moss
- (United States) Tyler Newton
- (United States) Charles O'Bannon
- (United States) Brian Rowsom
- (Japan) Takahiro Setsumasa
- (Japan) Ryusei Shinoyama
- (United States) Ryan Spangler
- (United States) Joe Stephens
- (Japan) Naoto Tsuji
- (United States) Cory Violette
- (Finland) Erik Murphy

== Arenas ==
- Todoroki Arena
- Tokkei Security Hiratsuka General Gymnasium

== Practice facilities ==
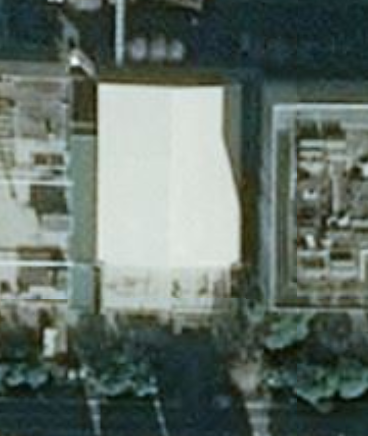
Toshiba Komukai Gymnasium

They practice at the Toshiba Komukai Gymnasium in Saiwai-ku, Kawasaki.
