= Japan Basketball League =

Professional basketball league (2007–2013)

- Founded: 2007
- First season: 2007–08
- Folded: 2013
- Country: Japan
- Confederation: FIBA Asia (Asia)
- Number of teams: 8
- Level on pyramid: 1
- Relegation to: JBL2
- Last champions: Aisin SeaHorses (4th title)
- Most championships: Aisin SeaHorses (4)
- Website: jbl.or.jp/ (Archived)

The Japan Basketball League (JBL) was a professional basketball league in Japan. It made up the top-tier of basketball in Japan alongside the bj league, Japan's other basketball competition, with no promotion and relegation between bj and the JBL.

The JBL was composed of two divisions, the JBL (Division 1, formerly JBL Super League) and the JBL2 (Division 2, formerly Japan League).

In June 2012, the Japan Basketball Association announced the establishment of the National Basketball League (NBL) as the topflight professional league in Japan. The 2012–13 season was the last JBL season as JBL teams joined the NBL.

== History ==
The Japan Basketball League was formed after the JBL Super League, which was held from 2001 to 2007, was disbanded. The new Japan Basketball League started with the 2007–08 season with 7 teams of the JBL Super League (Aisin SeaHorses, Hitachi SunRockers, Mitsubishi Electric Diamond Dolphins, OSG Phoenix, Panasonic Super Kangaroos, Toshiba Red Thunders, Toyota Alvark), and one team from another league, Rera Kamuy Hokkaido.

== List of champions ==
Season	Regular season champion	Finals champion	Series	Runner-up
2007–08	Aisin SeaHorses	Aisin SeaHorses	3–2	Toyota Alvark
2008–09	Aisin SeaHorses	Aisin SeaHorses	3–1	Hitachi SunRockers
2009–10	Aisin SeaHorses	Link Tochigi Brex	3–0	Aisin SeaHorses
2010–11	Aisin SeaHorses	No winner (league discontinued due to the 2011 Tōhoku earthquake and tsunami)		
2011–12	Aisin SeaHorses	Toyota Alvark	3–1	Aisin SeaHorses
2012–13	Aisin SeaHorses	Aisin SeaHorses	3–2	Toshiba Brave Thunders

== Award winners ==
=== Regular season MVP ===
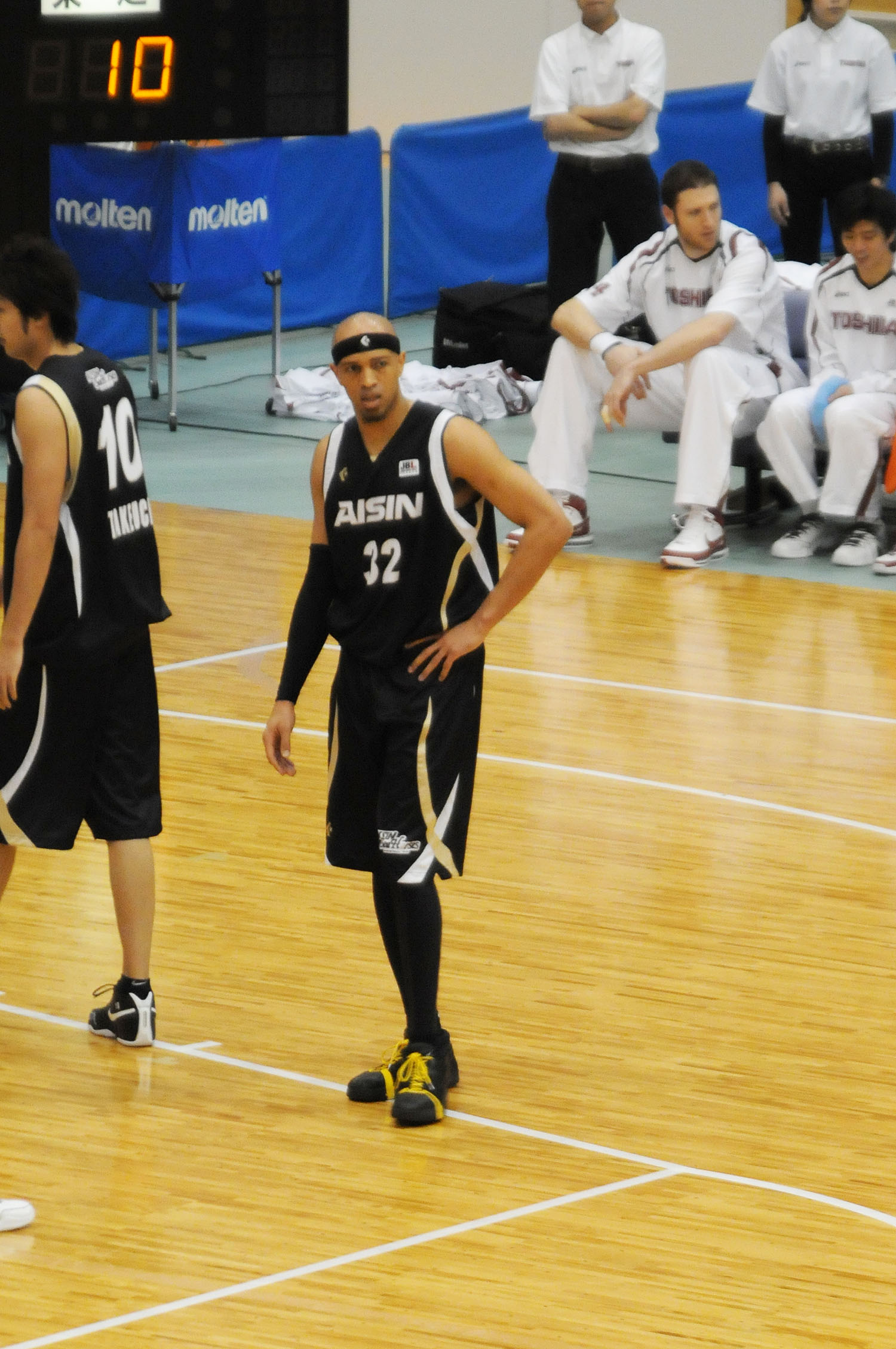
J. R. Sakuragi won the Regular season MVP award 3 times in a row

Season	MVP	Team
2007–08	(Japan) Shinsuke Kashiwagi	Aisin SeaHorses
2008–09	(Japan) Kosuke Takeuchi	Aisin SeaHorses
2009–10	(Japan) Kosuke Takeuchi (2×)	Aisin SeaHorses
2010–11	(Japan) J. R. Sakuragi	Aisin SeaHorses
2011–12	(Japan) J. R. Sakuragi (2×)	Aisin SeaHorses
2012–13	(Japan) J. R. Sakuragi (3×)	Aisin SeaHorses

=== Finals MVP ===
Season	MVP	Team
2007–08	(Japan) Shinsuke Kashiwagi	Aisin SeaHorses
2008–09	(Japan) Kosuke Takeuchi	Aisin SeaHorses
2009–10	(Japan) Yuta Tabuse	Link Tochigi Brex
2010–11	No winner (playoffs not played)	
2011–12	(United States) Philip Ricci	Toyota Alvark
2012–13	(Japan) J. R. Sakuragi	Aisin SeaHorses

== Statistical leaders ==
=== Top scorers ===
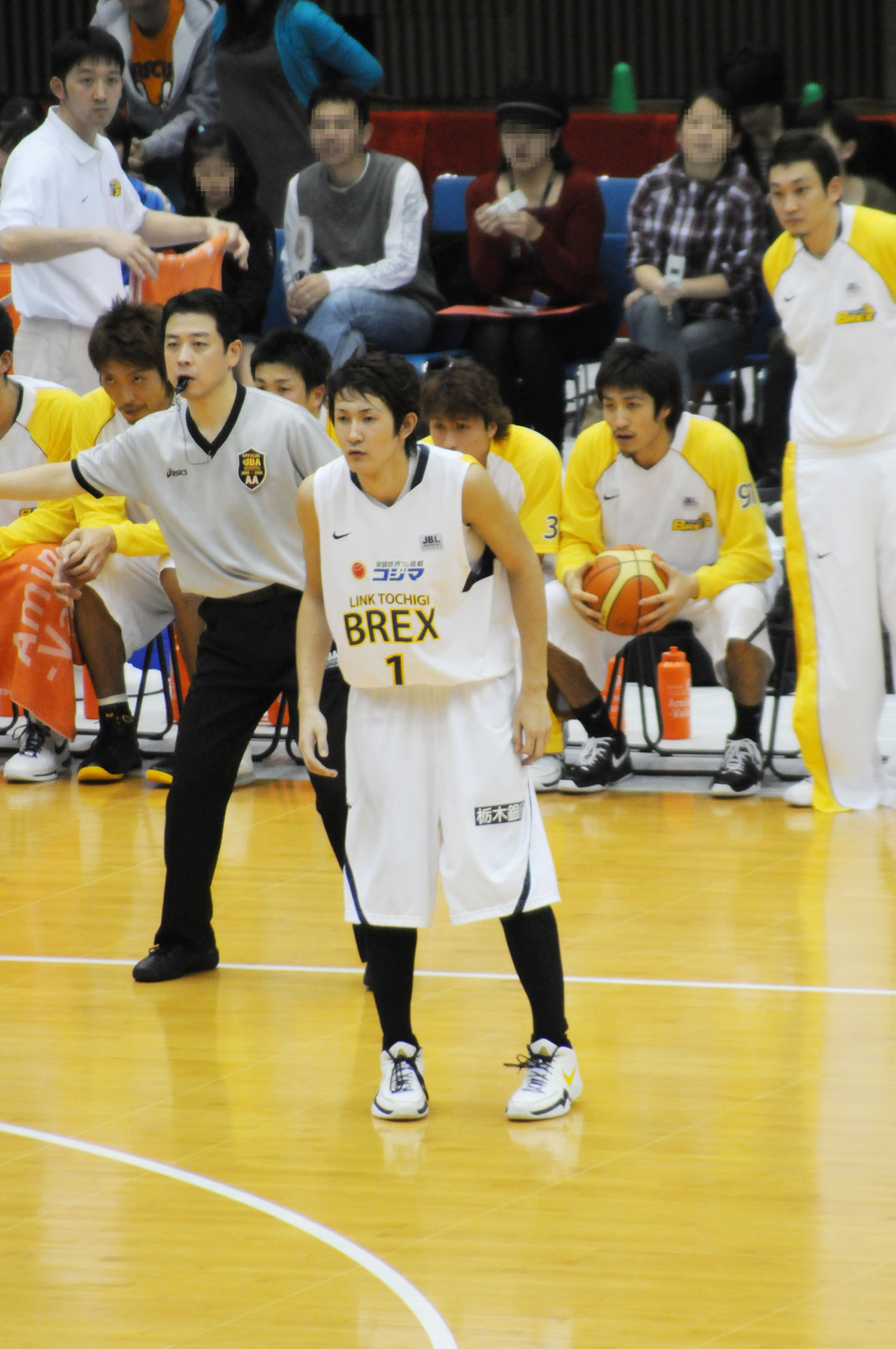
Takuya Kawamura led the league in scoring for 4 consecutive seasons

Season	Player	Team	PPG
2007–08	(United States) Marquis Estill	OSG Phoenix	24.9
2008–09	(Japan) Takuya Kawamura	Link Tochigi Brex	20.4
2009–10	(Japan) Takuya Kawamura (2×)	Link Tochigi Brex	20.5
2010–11	(Japan) Takuya Kawamura (3×)	Link Tochigi Brex	19.3
2011–12	(Japan) Takuya Kawamura (4×)	Link Tochigi Brex	20.4
2012–13	(United States) Nick Fazekas	Toshiba Brave Thunders	21.6

=== Rebounding leaders ===
Season	Player	Team	RPG
2007–08	(United States) Marquis Estill	OSG Phoenix	16.0
2008–09	(United States) Cory Violette	Toshiba Brave Thunders	11.0
2009–10	(Japan) Kosuke Takeuchi	Aisin SeaHorses	11.4
2010–11	(Japan) Joji Takeuchi	Hitachi SunRockers	12.2
2011–12	(Japan) J. R. Sakuragi	Aisin SeaHorses	12.0
2012–13	(Japan) J. R. Sakuragi (2×)	Aisin SeaHorses	12.5

=== Assists leaders ===
Season	Player	Team	APG
2007–08	(United States) Cliff Hawkins	OSG Phoenix	7.5
2008–09	(Japan) Yuta Tabuse	Link Tochigi Brex	5.6
2009–10	(Japan) Shinsuke Kashiwagi	Aisin SeaHorses	4.1
2010–11	(Japan) J. R. Sakuragi	Aisin SeaHorses	3.9
2011–12	(Japan) Takuya Kawamura	Link Tochigi Brex	4.5
2012–13	(Japan) J. R. Sakuragi (2×)	Aisin SeaHorses	4.4

=== Steals leaders ===
Season	Player	Team	SPG
2007–08	(United States) Cliff Hawkins	OSG Phoenix	2.3
2008–09	(Japan) Yuta Tabuse	Link Tochigi Brex	2.3
2009–10	(Japan) Toshihiro Sato	Hitachi SunRockers	2.9
2010–11	(Japan) Shinsuke Kashiwagi	Aisin SeaHorses	2.1
2011–12	(Japan) Toshihiro Sato (2×)	Hitachi SunRockers	1.7
2012–13	(Japan) Tomokazu Abe	Levanga Hokkaido	2.1

=== Blocks leaders ===
Season	Player	Team	BPG
2007–08	(Japan) Kosuke Takeuchi	Aisin SeaHorses	1.8
2008–09	(Japan) Kosuke Takeuchi (2×)	Aisin SeaHorses	1.7
2009–10	(Japan) Kosuke Takeuchi (3×)	Aisin SeaHorses	2.0
2010–11	(Japan) Kosuke Takeuchi (4×)	Aisin SeaHorses	1.7
2011–12	(Japan) Joji Takeuchi	Hitachi SunRockers	1.5
2012–13	(United States) Jameel Watkins	Panasonic Trians	2.1

== Clubs ==
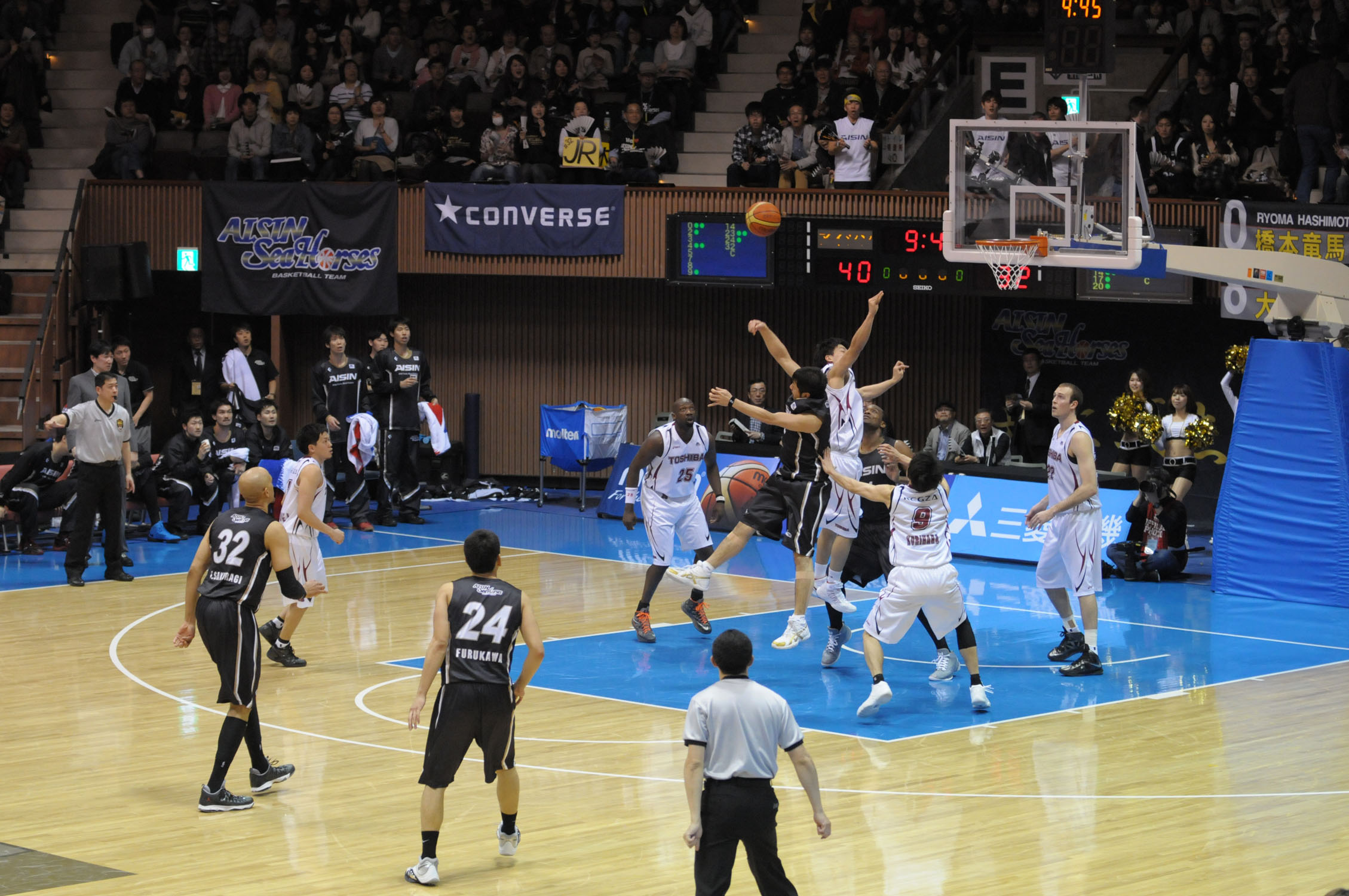
The playoff final game between the Aisin SeaHorses and the Toshiba Brave Thunders in 2013

The teams that played in JBL's last season in 2012–13 were:

=== JBL ===
- Aisin SeaHorses
- Mitsubishi Diamond Dolphins
- Levanga Hokkaido
- Toyota Alvark
- Hitachi SunRockers
- Toshiba Brave Thunders
- Panasonic Trians
- Link Tochigi Brex

=== JBL2 ===
- Hitachi Cable Bulldogs
- Big Blue Tokyo
- Kuroda Electric Bullet Spirits
- Ishikawa Blue Sparks
- Toyota Tsusho Fighting Eagles
- Aisin AW Areions Anjo
- Toyoda Gosei Scorpions
- Renova Kagoshima
- TGI D-Rise
- Hyogo Storks
