= 2018–19 V.League Division 1 Women's =

- League: V.League Division 1
- Sport: Volleyball
- Duration: Nov 3, 2018 – Apr 13, 2019
- Games: 110 (Regular round); 32 (Final stage)
- Teams: 11

2018–2019
- Season champions: Hisamitsu Springs
- Top scorer: Jana Kulan
- Finals champions: Hisamitsu Springs
- Runners-up: Toray Arrows
- Finals MVP: Foluke Akinradewo

Women's V.League Division 1 seasons
- 2017–18 2019–20

The Volleyball 2018–19 V.League Division 1 Women's was the 25th tournament year and the 1st top level women's tournament of the newly branded and reorganized V.League (Japan). It was held from November 3, 2018 – April 13, 2019.

== Clubs ==
Locations of the 2018–19 V.League Division 1 Women's clubs

=== Personnel ===
2018–19 V.League Division 1 Women's Personnel
Club	Head coach	Captain	Province/City	Colors	Main Sponsor
Saitama Ageo Medics	(Japan) Toshiaki Yoshida	(Japan) Yuko Maruyama	Ageo, Saitama		Ageo Medical Group
Denso Airybees	(Japan) Yuan Kawakita	(Japan) Mika Yamada	Nishio, Aichi		Denso
Hisamitsu Springs	(Japan) Shingo Sakai	(Japan) Nana Iwasaka	Kobe, Hyogo and Tosu, Saga		Hisamitsu Pharmaceutical
Hitachi Rivale	(Japan) Hiroyuki Kai	(Japan) Miya Sato	Hitachinaka, Ibaraki		Hitachi Automotive Systems
JT Marvelous	(Japan) Tomoko Yoshihhara	(Japan) Mako Kobata	Nishinomiya		Japan Tobacco Ltd.
Kurobe AquaFairies	(Japan) Maruyama Takaya	(Japan) Saki Maruyama	Toyama Prefecture		Kurobe Corporation
NEC Red Rockets	(Japan) Kaneko Takayuki	(Japan) Mizuki Yanagita	Kawasaki, Kanagawa		NEC
Okayama Seagulls	(Japan) Akiyoshi Kawamoto	(Japan) Mai Yamaguchi	Okayama		Okayama Corporation
PFU BlueCats	(Japan) Kato Yoichi	(Japan) Mai Shimizu	Kahoku, Ishikawa		PFU Corporation
Toray Arrows	(Japan) Koichiro Kanno	(Japan) Mari Horikawa	Ōtsu, Shiga		Toray Industries
Toyota Auto Body Queenseis	(Japan) Asako Tajimi	(Japan) Saori Takahashi	Kariya, Aichi		Toyota Auto Body

=== Foreign players ===
The total number of foreign players is restricted to one per club. Player from Southeast Asia nations are exempt from these restrictions.

V.League Division 1 Women's foreign players
Team	Player	Other
Saitama Ageo Medics	(Croatia) Katarina Barun (CEV)	(Philippines) Jaja Santiago (AVC)
Denso Airybees	(Trinidad and Tobago) Sinead Jack (NORCECA)	—N/a
Hisamitsu Springs	(United States) Foluke Akinradewo (NORCECA)	—N/a
Hitachi Rivale	(Belgium) Laura Heyrman (CEV)	—N/a
JT Marvelous	(Serbia) Brankica Mihajlović (CEV)	(Thailand) Kaewkalaya Kamulthala (AVC)
Kurobe AquaFairies	(Belgium) Freya Aelbrecht (CEV)	—N/a
NEC Red Rockets	(United States) Rhamat Alhassan (NORCECA)	—N/a
PFU BlueCats	(United States) Jennifer Doris (NORCECA)	(Thailand) Chatchu-on Moksri (AVC)
Toray Arrows	(Azerbaijan) Jana Kulan (CEV)	(Philippines) Dindin Santiago-Manabat (AVC)
Toyota Auto Body Queenseis	(Turkey) Neriman Özsoy (CEV)	—N/a

=== Transfer players ===
Player	Moving from	Moving to
(Japan) Koyomi Tominaga	(Japan) Saitama Ageo Medics	(Italy) Lardini Filottrano
(Cuba) Kenia Carcaces	(Japan) Saitama Ageo Medics	(Italy) Pomì Casalmaggiore
(Philippines) Jaja Santiago	(Philippines) Foton Tornadoes	(Japan) Saitama Ageo Medics
(Japan) Yuka Sato	(Japan) Toyota Walkure	(Japan) Saitama Ageo Medics
(Croatia) Katarina Barun	(Italy) Liu Jo Nordmeccanica Modena	(Japan) Saitama Ageo Medics
(Germany) Christiane Fürst	(Japan) Denso Airybees	—N/a
(Japan) Kozue Hayasaka	(Japan) Ashiya University	(Japan) Denso Airybees
(Japan) Asuka Nomura	(Japan) Toray Arrows	(Japan) Denso Airybees
(Trinidad and Tobago) Sinead Jack	(Turkey) Galatasaray S.K.	(Japan) Denso Airybees
(Japan) Miyu Nagaoka	(Japan) Hisamitsu Springs	(Italy) Imoco Volley Conegliano
(United States) Cursty Jackson	(Japan) Hitachi Rivale	(Turkey) Galatasaray S.K.
(Belgium) Laura Heyrman	(Italy) Liu Jo Nordmeccanica Modena	(Japan) Hitachi Rivale
(Japan) Mai Okumura	(Japan) JT Marvelous	(Thailand) Nakhon Ratchasima
(Japan) Kotoe Inoue	(Japan) JT Marvelous	(Romania) CSM București
(Thailand) Kaewkalaya Kamulthala	(Thailand) Thai–Denmark Khonkaen Star	(Japan) JT Marvelous
(Japan) Megumi Kurihara	(Japan) Hitachi Rivale	(Japan) JT Marvelous
(Belgium) Freya Aelbrecht	(Italy) Volley Pesaro	(Japan) Kurobe AquaFairies
(United States) Rhamat Alhassan	(United States) Professional debut University of Florida varsity	(Japan) NEC Red Rockets
(Japan) Saki Minemura	(Japan) Toray Arrows	(Japan) NEC Red Rockets
(Thailand) Chatchu-on Moksri	(Thailand) Nakhon Ratchasima	(Japan) PFU BlueCats
(United States) Kadie Rolfzen	(Japan) Toray Arrows	(China) Henan Volleyball
(Japan) Kanami Tashiro	(Japan) Toray Arrows	(Romania) CSM București
(Azerbaijan) Jana Kulan	(Turkey) Çanakkale Belediyespor	(Japan) Toray Arrows
(Philippines) Dindin Santiago-Manabat	(Philippines) Foton Tornadoes	(Japan) Toray Arrows
(Japan) Mami Uchiseto	(Italy) Pallavolo Hermaea	(Japan) Toyota Auto Body Queenseis

== Stadiums ==
Regular Round

Nices Arena
Ukaruchan Arena
Kobe Green Arena
Wing Arena Kariya
ZIP Arena Okayama
Ishikawa Sports Center
Komazawa Gymnasium

Tsu City Sports Center
YKK Kurobe Gymnastics
Ageo Citizen Gymnasium
Beikomu Total Gymnastics
Osaka Municipal Gymnasium
Ota City General Gymnasium
Kanazawa General Gymnasium

Wink Gymnasium
Sakura Ward Hall
Kurobe-shi General Center
Hitachinaka City Gymnasium
Saga Sunrise Park Gymnasium
Kawasaki City Todoroki Arena
Hasuda-shi Citizen Gymnasium

Funabashi Arena
Ikenokawa Sakura Arena
Ehime Prefecture Budokan
Nishio Municipal Gymnasium
Fukaya City General Stadium
Horaiya Koriyama Gymnasium
Nippon Steel Sakai Gymnasium

Final stage

== Season standing procedure ==
1. The teams will be ranked by the most point gained per match as follows:
  - Match won 3–0 or 3–1: 3 points for the winner, 0 points for the loser
  - Match won 3–2: 2 points for the winner, 1 point for the loser
  - Match forfeited: 3 points for the winner, 0 points (0–25, 0–25, 0–25) for the loser
2. In the event of a tie, the following first tiebreaker will apply: Total number of victories (matches won, matched lost)
3. If teams are still tied after examining points gained and the number of victories, then the results to break the tie will be examined in the following order:
  - Set quotient: if two or more teams are tied on total number of victories, they will be ranked by the quotient resulting from the division of the number of all set won by the number of all sets lost.
  - Points quotient: if the tie persists based on the set quotient, the teams will be ranked by the quotient resulting from the division of all points scored by the total of points lost during all sets.
  - If the tie persists based on the point quotient, the tie will be broken based on the team that won the match of the Round Robin Phase between the tied teams. When the tie in point quotient is between three or more teams, these teams ranked taking into consideration only the matches involving the teams in question.

== Regular round ==
=== Standings ===
==== Western Conference ====
Pos	Team	Pld	W	L	Pts	SW	SL	SR	SPW	SPL	SPR	Qualification
1	Hisamitsu Springs	20	18	2	52	57	19	3.000	1805	1571	1.149	Final 8
2	JT Marvelous	20	14	6	44	52	31	1.677	1880	1749	1.075	Final 8
3	Toyota Auto Body Queenseis	20	13	7	39	43	28	1.536	1665	1550	1.074	Final 8
4	Toray Arrows	20	13	7	37	46	33	1.394	1789	1694	1.056	Final 8
5	Okayama Seagulls	20	10	10	30	41	38	1.079	1771	1748	1.013	

Updated to match(es) played on 23 February 2019.
Source: Western Conference Ranking Table V.league Division 1 Women's 2018–19

==== Eastern Conference ====
Pos	Team	Pld	W	L	Pts	SW	SL	SR	SPW	SPL	SPR	Qualification
1	NEC Red Rockets	20	11	9	35	43	36	1.194	1758	1729	1.017	Final 8
2	Saitama Ageo Medics	20	11	9	32	40	37	1.081	1703	1643	1.037	Final 8
3	Denso Airybees	20	10	10	29	35	36	0.972	1593	1602	0.994	Final 8
4	Hitachi Rivale	20	8	12	21	36	49	0.735	1783	1910	0.934	Final 8
5	Kurobe AquaFairies	20	2	18	7	16	60	0.267	1383	1646	0.840	
6	PFU BlueCats	20	0	20	4	12	54	0.222	1528	1816	0.841	

Updated to match(es) played on 23 February 2019
Source: Eastern Conference Ranking Table V.league Division 1 Women's 2018–19

=== Positions by week ===
Leader and qualification to Final 8
Qualification to Final 8

==== Western Conference ====
Club ╲ Week	1	2	3	4	5	6	7	8	9	10	11	12	13	14
Hisamitsu Springs	2	3	3	3	3	1	1	1	1	1	1	1	1	1
JT Marvelous	1	2	2	2	2	2	2	2	2	2	2	2	2	2
Okayama Seagulls	4	5	5	5	5	5	5	5	5	5	5	5	5	5
Toray Arrows	5	4	4	4	4	4	4	4	4	4	4	4	4	4
Toyota Auto Body Queenseis	3	1	1	1	1	3	3	3	3	3	3	3	3	3

==== Eastern Conference ====
Club ╲ Week	1	2	3	4	5	6	7	8	9	10	11	12	13	14
Saitama Ageo Medics	1	2	4	4	4	4	4	4	1	1	1	2	2	2
Denso Airybees	6	3	2	2	2	2	2	3	2	2	3	3	3	3
Hitachi Rivale	2	4	3	3	3	3	3	2	4	4	4	4	4	4
Kurobe AquaFairies	4	5	5	5	5	5	5	5	5	5	5	5	5	5
NEC Red Rockets	3	1	1	1	1	1	1	1	3	3	2	1	1	1
PFU BlueCats	5	6	6	6	6	6	6	6	6	6	6	6	6	6

=== Results by match played ===
==== Western Conference ====
Team ╲ Round	1	2	3	4	5	6	7	8	9	10	11	12	13	14	15	16	17	18	19	20
Hisamitsu Springs	W	L	W	W	W	W	W	W	W	W	W	W	W	W	L	W	W	W	W	W
JT Marvelous	W	L	W	W	L	W	W	W	W	W	W	L	L	W	L	W	W	W	L	W
Okayama Seagulls	L	L	W	L	L	L	L	L	W	L	W	W	W	W	W	W	W	L	W	L
Toray Arrows	L	W	L	W	W	L	W	L	W	L	W	W	W	L	W	W	L	W	W	W
Toyota Auto Body Queenseis	W	W	W	W	L	W	W	W	L	L	W	W	L	L	W	L	W	L	W	W

W = Win; L = Lose

==== Eastern Conference ====
Team ╲ Round	1	2	3	4	5	6	7	8	9	10	11	12	13	14	15	16	17	18	19	20
Saitama Ageo Medics	W	W	L	L	W	L	L	W	L	L	W	W	L	W	W	W	W	L	W	L
Denso Airybees	L	W	W	W	L	W	W	L	W	L	L	L	W	W	L	L	L	W	L	W
Hitachi Rivale	W	W	L	L	W	W	W	L	W	W	L	W	L	L	L	L	L	L	L	L
Kurobe AquaFairies	L	L	W	L	L	L	L	L	L	W	L	L	L	L	L	L	L	L	L	L
NEC Red Rockets	W	L	W	W	W	L	L	L	W	L	W	L	L	W	L	W	W	W	L	W
PFU BlueCats	L	L	L	L	L	L	L	L	L	L	L	L	L	L	L	L	L	L	L	L

W = Win; L = Lose

=== Results table ===
==== Western Conference ====
===== Leg 1 =====
Home \ Away	HIS	JT	OKA	TOR	TBQ
Hisamitsu Springs		2–3	3–1	3–0	3–0
JT Marvelous	3–2		3–1	3–1	2–3
Okayama Seagulls	1–3	1–3		1–3	3–1
Toray Arrows	0–3	1–3	3–1		3–1
Toyota Auto Body Queenseis	0–3	3–2	1–3	1–3	

Legend: Blue = home team win; Yellow = draw; Red = away team win.

===== Leg 2 =====
Home \ Away	HIS	JT	OKA	TOR	TBQ
Hisamitsu Springs		3–0	3–1	3–1	3–0
JT Marvelous	0–3		3–0	3–1	3–0
Okayama Seagulls	1–3	0–3		3–2	3–0
Toray Arrows	1–3	1–3	2–3		3–2
Toyota Auto Body Queenseis	0–3	0–3	0–3	2–3	

Legend: Blue = home team win; Yellow = draw; Red = away team win.

==== Eastern Conference ====
===== Leg 1 =====
Home \ Away	AGE	DEN	HIT	KUR	NEC	PFU
Saitama Ageo Medics		0–3	2–3	3–1	3–0	3–0
Denso Airybees	3–0		3–1	3–0	0–3	3–0
Hitachi Rivale	3–2	1–3		3–2	2–3	3–2
Kurobe AquaFairies	1–3	0–3	2–3		0–3	3–0
NEC Red Rockets	0–3	3–0	3–2	3–0		3–0
PFU BlueCats	0–3	0–3	2–3	0–3	0–3	

Legend: Blue = home team win; Yellow = draw; Red = away team win.

===== Leg 2 =====
Home \ Away	AGE	DEN	HIT	KUR	NEC	PFU
Saitama Ageo Medics		2–3	3–1	3–0	3–2	3–1
Denso Airybees	3–2		3–0	3–1	0–3	3–0
Hitachi Rivale	1–3	0–3		3–0	0–3	3–1
Kurobe AquaFairies	0–3	1–3	0–3		1–3	3–1
NEC Red Rockets	2–3	3–0	3–0	3–1		3–1
PFU BlueCats	1–3	0–3	1–3	1–3	1–3	

Legend: Blue = home team win; Yellow = draw; Red = away team win.

==== Interchange ====
===== Leg 1 =====
Home \ Away	AGE	DEN	HIS	HIT	JT	KUR	NEC	OKA	PFU	TOR	TBQ
Saitama Ageo Medics			0–3		1–3			3–2		0–3	0–3
Denso Airybees			1–3		1–3			0–3		3–0	1–3
Hisamitsu Springs	3–0	3–1		3–2		3–1	3–0		3–1		
Hitachi Rivale			2–3		3–2			3–2		2–3	1–3
JT Marvelous	3–1	3–1		2–3		3–0	3–2		3–1		
Kurobe AquaFairies			1–3		0–3			0–3		0–3	1–3
NEC Red Rockets			0–3		2–3			3–1		2–3	0–3
Okayama Seagulls	2–3	3–0		2–3		3–0	1–3		3–2		
PFU BlueCats			1–3		1–3			2–3		1–3	0–3
Toray Arrows	3–0	0–3		3–2		3–0	3–2		3–1		
Toyota Auto Body Queenseis	3–0	3–1		3–1		3–1	3–0		3–0		

Legend: Blue = home team win; Yellow = draw; Red = away team win.

===== Leg 2 =====
Home \ Away	AGE	DEN	HIS	HIT	JT	KUR	NEC	OKA	PFU	TOR	TBQ
Saitama Ageo Medics			3–1		3–2			3–0		1–3	1–3
Denso Airybees			2–3		3–2			0–3		0–3	0–3
Hisamitsu Springs	1–3	3–2		3–1		3–0	3–2		3–0		
Hitachi Rivale			1–3		1–3			3–2		0–3	1–3
JT Marvelous	2–3	2–3		3–1		3–0	2–3		3–2		
Kurobe AquaFairies			0–3		0–3			0–3		0–3	0–3
NEC Red Rockets			2–3		3–2			2–3		3–2	0–3
Okayama Seagulls	0–3	3–0		2–3		3–0	3–2		3–1		
PFU BlueCats			0–3		2–3			1–3		2–3	0–3
Toray Arrows	3–1	3–0		3–0		3–0	2–3		3–2		
Toyota Auto Body Queenseis	3–1	3–0		3–1		3–0	3–0		3–0		

Legend: Blue = home team win; Yellow = draw; Red = away team win.

=== Head-to-head results ===
Home \ Away	AGE	DEN	HIS	HIT	JT	KUR	NEC	OKA	PFU	TOR	TBQ
Saitama Ageo Medics		0–2	1–1	1–1	1–1	2–0	2–0	2–0	2–0	0–2	0–2
Denso Airybees	1–0		0–2	2–0	1–1	2–0	0–2	0–2	2–0	1–1	0–2
Hisamitsu Springs	1–1	2–0		2–0	1–1	2–0	2–0	2–0	2–0	2–0	2–0
Hitachi Rivale	1–1	0–2	0–2		1–1	2–0	0–2	2–0	2–0	0–2	0–2
JT Marvelous	1–1	1–1	1–1	1–1		2–0	1–1	2–0	2–0	2–0	1–1
Kurobe AquaFairies	0–2	0–2	0–2	0–2	0–2		0–2	0–2	2–0	0–2	0–2
NEC Red Rockets	0–2	2–0	0–2	2–0	1–1	2–0		1–1	2–0	1–1	0–2
Okayama Seagulls	0–2	2–0	0–2	0–2	0–2	2–0	1–1		2–0	1–1	2–0
PFU BlueCats	0–2	0–2	0–2	0–2	0–2	0–2	0–2	0–2		0–2	0–2
Toray Arrows	2–0	1–1	0–2	2–0	0–2	2–0	1–1	1–1	2–0		2–0
Toyota Auto Body Queenseis	2–0	2–0	0–2	2–0	1–1	2–0	2–0	0–2	2–0	0–2	

Legend: Blue = home team win; Yellow = draw; Red = away team win.

=== Results ===
==== Week 1 ====
- All times are Japan Standard Time (UTC+09:00).
- Venue: Nices Arena, Yurihonjo
- Venue: Komazawa Gymnasium, Tokyo
- Venue: Osaka Municipal Central Gymnasium, Osaka

Date	Time		Score		Set 1	Set 2	Set 3	Set 4	Set 5	Total	Report
3 Nov	12:00	Saitama Ageo Medics	3–1	Kurobe AquaFairies	23–25	25–14	25–19	25–16		98–74	
3 Nov	12:15	Denso Airybees	0–3	NEC Red Rockets	18–25	25–27	19–25			62–77	
3 Nov	13:00	JT Marvelous	3–1	Okayama Seagulls	27–25	23–25	25–20	25–23		100–93	
3 Nov	15:00	Hitachi Rivale	3–2	PFU BlueCats	23–25	25–15	20–25	25–22	15–11	108–98	
3 Nov	15:10	Toray Arrows	0–3	Hisamitsu Springs	17–25	14–25	22–25			53–75	
4 Nov	12:00	Saitama Ageo Medics	3–0	PFU BlueCats	25–15	25–19	26–24			76–58	
4 Nov	13:00	JT Marvelous	2–3	Toyota Auto Body Queenseis	19–25	25–20	25–20	23–25	13–15	105–105	
4 Nov	15:00	Hitachi Rivale	3–2	Kurobe AquaFairies	22–25	18–25	25–23	25–23	15–10	105–106	

==== Week 2 ====
- All times are Japan Standard Time (UTC+09:00).
- Venue: Beikomu Total Gymnastics, Amagasaki
- Venue: Kanazawa City General Gymnasium, Kanazawa

Date	Time		Score		Set 1	Set 2	Set 3	Set 4	Set 5	Total	Report
10 Nov	11:00	Denso Airybees	3–0	Saitama Ageo Medics	25–21	25–22	25–23			75–66	
10 Nov	12:00	Toray Arrows	3–1	Okayama Seagulls	25–14	16–25	25–23	25–22		91–84	
10 Nov	13:15	Toyota Auto Body Queenseis	3–0	NEC Red Rockets	25–17	25–20	25–18			75–55	
10 Nov	15:00	JT Marvelous	3–2	Hisamitsu Springs	25–20	21–25	14–25	25–19	15–10	100–99	
10 Nov	15:30	PFU BlueCats	0–3	Kurobe AquaFairies	18–25	19–25	28–30			65–80	
11 Nov	11:00	Denso Airybees	3–1	Hitachi Rivale	21–25	25–19	26–24	25–16		97–84	
11 Nov	13:40	Toyota Auto Body Queenseis	3–1	Kurobe AquaFairies	20–25	25–17	25–21	25–21		95–84	
11 Nov	16:25	PFU BlueCats	0–3	NEC Red Rockets	22–25	20–25	17–25			59–75	

==== Week 3 ====
- All times are Japan Standard Time (UTC+09:00).
- Venue: Wing Arena Kariya, Kariya
- Venue: Ageo Citizen Gymnasium, Ageo
- Venue: YKK Kurobe Gymnastics, Kurobe

Date	Time		Score		Set 1	Set 2	Set 3	Set 4	Set 5	Total	Report
17 Nov	12:00	Okayama Seagulls	3–2	PFU BlueCats	21–25	25–19	25–17	18–25	15–12	104–98	
17 Nov	12:00	Toyota Auto Body Queenseis	3–1	Hitachi Rivale	29–31	25–21	25–15	29–27		108–94	
17 Nov	14:05	Saitama Ageo Medics	0–3	Hisamitsu Springs	20–25	21–25	21–25			62–75	
17 Nov	15:00	JT Marvelous	3–1	Toray Arrows	16–25	25–17	25–19	28–26		94–87	
17 Nov	15:25	Kurobe AquaFairies	0–3	NEC Red Rockets	17–25	21–25	23–25			61–75	
18 Nov	12:00	NEC Red Rockets	3–1	PFU BlueCats	20–25	25–18	25–21	25–23		95–87	
18 Nov	12:00	Toyota Auto Body Queenseis	1–3	Toray Arrows	22–25	25–16	20–25	24–26		91–92	
18 Nov	15:00	JT Marvelous	2–3	Hitachi Rivale	18–25	28–26	21–25	25–21	11–15	103–112	
18 Nov	15:10	Kurobe AquaFairies	0–3	Denso Airybees	17–25	23–25	19–25			59–75	

==== Week 4 ====
- All times are Japan Standard Time (UTC+09:00).
- Venue: Momotaro Arena, Okayama
- Venue: Ishikawa Sports Center, Kanazawa
- Venue: Tsu City Industry and Sports Center, Tsu
- Venue: Ota City General Gymnasium, Ōta, Tokyo

Date	Time		Score		Set 1	Set 2	Set 3	Set 4	Set 5	Total	Report
24 Nov	11:00	Toyota Auto Body Queenseis	3–1	Denso Airybees	25–21	25–22	17–25	25–20		92–88	
24 Nov	12:00	PFU BlueCats	1–3	JT Marvelous	25–19	24–26	16–25	12–25		77–95	
24 Nov	13:00	NEC Red Rockets	2–3	Toray Arrows	25–23	15–25	25–14	16–25	9–15	90–102	
24 Nov	13:00	Okayama Seagulls	2–3	Saitama Ageo Medics	27–25	25–18	19–25	16–25	9–15	96–108	
25 Nov	11:00	Denso Airybees	3–1	Kurobe AquaFairies	26–24	20–25	25–17	26–24		97–90	
25 Nov	13:00	NEC Red Rockets	0–3	Hisamitsu Springs	17–25	22–25	21–25			60–75	
25 Nov	13:00	Okayama Seagulls	2–3	Hitachi Rivale	25–17	20–25	18–25	25–21	10–15	98–103	

==== Week 5 ====
- All times are Japan Standard Time (UTC+09:00).
- Venue: Ukaruchan Arena, Otsu
- Venue: Kobe Green Arena, Kobe
- Venue: Fukaya City General Stadium, Fukaya
- Venue: Kawasaki City Todoroki Arena, Kawasaki

Date	Time		Score		Set 1	Set 2	Set 3	Set 4	Set 5	Total	Report
1 Dec	12:00	Hitachi Rivale	3–2	Okayama Seagulls	28–26	25–20	19–25	20–25	17–15	109–111	
1 Dec	13:00	NEC Red Rockets	2–3	JT Marvelous	22–25	25–18	18–25	25–22	16–18	106–108	
1 Dec	13:00	Toray Arrows	0–3	Denso Airybees	20–25	21–25	35–37			76–87	
1 Dec	13:00	Hisamitsu Springs	3–1	PFU BlueCats	25–23	20–25	25–20	25–13		95–81	
1 Dec	15:00	Saitama Ageo Medics	0–3	Toyota Auto Body Queenseis	20–25	20–25	18–25			58–75	
2 Dec	11:00	NEC Red Rockets	3–1	Okayama Seagulls	25–21	25–19	21–25	25–15		96–80	
2 Dec	12:00	Hisamitsu Springs	3–1	Denso Airybees	25–13	25–18	21–25	25–22		96–78	
2 Dec	13:00	Saitama Ageo Medics	1–3	JT Marvelous	26–24	24–26	22–25	21–25		93–100	
2 Dec	15:00	Toray Arrows	3–0	Kurobe AquaFairies	25–20	25–17	25–23			75–60	
2 Dec	16:30	Toyota Auto Body Queenseis	3–1	Hitachi Rivale	20–25	25–13	25–19	25–18		95–75	

==== Week 6 ====
- All times are Japan Standard Time (UTC+09:00).
- Venue: Hitachinaka City General Sports Park Gymnasium, Hitachinaka
- Venue: Saga Prefecture General Gymnasium, Saga
- Venue: Hasuda-shi General Citizen Gymnasium, Hasuda

Date	Time		Score		Set 1	Set 2	Set 3	Set 4	Set 5	Total	Report
8 Dec	12:00	Denso Airybees	3–0	PFU BlueCats	25–21	25–21	25–16			75–58	
8 Dec	12:00	Hisamitsu Springs	3–0	Toyota Auto Body Queenseis	25–21	25–23	32–30			82–74	
8 Dec	13:00	Saitama Ageo Medics	3–0	NEC Red Rockets	27–25	25–17	25–19			77–61	
8 Dec	15:00	Hitachi Rivale	3–0	Kurobe AquaFairies	26–24	25–21	25–19			76–64	
8 Dec	15:00	JT Marvelous	3–0	Okayama Seagulls	25–22	25–22	25–18			75–62	
9 Dec	11:00	Kurobe AquaFairies	3–1	PFU BlueCats	25–20	20–25	25–23	25–22		95–90	
9 Dec	12:00	Hisamitsu Springs	3–1	Toray Arrows	25–19	15–25	25–22	25–22		90–88	
9 Dec	13:00	Denso Airybees	0–3	NEC Red Rockets	22–25	21–25	19–25			62–75	
9 Dec	15:00	Hitachi Rivale	3–2	Saitama Ageo Medics	25–21	25–21	20–25	20–25	15–9	105–101	
9 Dec	15:00	Toyota Auto Body Queenseis	1–3	Okayama Seagulls	28–26	29–31	22–25	20–25		99–107	

==== Week 7 ====
- All times are Japan Standard Time (UTC+09:00).
- Venue: Kurobe-shi General Physical Education Center, Kurobe

Date	Time		Score		Set 1	Set 2	Set 3	Set 4	Set 5	Total	Report
5 Jan	11:00	Hisamitsu Springs	3–1	Okayama Seagulls	23–25	25–20	25–9	25–20		98–74	
5 Jan	13:25	Saitama Ageo Medics	0–3	Toray Arrows	19–25	18–25	23–25			60–75	
5 Jan	15:00	Kurobe AquaFairies	0–3	JT Marvelous	9–25	16–25	23–25			48–75	
6 Jan	12:00	Hisamitsu Springs	3–0	PFU BlueCats	25–14	25–16	25–23			75–53	
6 Jan	15:00	Kurobe AquaFairies	0–3	Saitama Ageo Medics	20–25	22–25	21–25			63–75	

==== Week 8 ====
- All times are Japan Standard Time (UTC+09:00).
- Venue: Wink Gymnasium, Himeji
- Venue: Sakura Ward Hall, Saitama
- Venue: Momotaro Arena, Okayama
- Venue: Kakogawa Municipal General Gymnasium, Kakogawa

Date	Time		Score		Set 1	Set 2	Set 3	Set 4	Set 5	Total	Report
12 Jan	12:00	NEC Red Rockets	0–3	Toyota Auto Body Queenseis	24–26	23–25	23–25			70–76	
12 Jan	13:00	Okayama Seagulls	3–2	Toray Arrows	25–13	19–25	21–25	29–27	15–11	109–101	
12 Jan	14:00	Hisamitsu Springs	3–1	Kurobe AquaFairies	25–16	21–25	25–19	25–19		96–79	
12 Jan	15:00	Saitama Ageo Medics	3–1	Hitachi Rivale	15–25	25–13	25–20	25–10		90–68	
12 Jan	16:00	JT Marvelous	3–1	Denso Airybees	18–25	25–22	25–14	25–23		93–84	
13 Jan	12:00	Saitama Ageo Medics	1–3	Toyota Auto Body Queenseis	15–25	25–19	16–25	22–25		78–94	
13 Jan	13:00	Okayama Seagulls	3–0	Kurobe AquaFairies	25–11	25–20	25–23			75–54	
13 Jan	14:00	Hisamitsu Springs	3–0	JT Marvelous	33–31	25–19	25–17			83–67	
13 Jan	15:00	Hitachi Rivale	3–1	PFU BlueCats	25–22	20–25	25–18	25–19		95–84	
13 Jan	16:00	Denso Airybees	0–3	Toray Arrows	21–25	16–25	28–30			65–80	

==== Week 9 ====
- All times are Japan Standard Time (UTC+09:00).
- Venue: Funabashi Arena, Funabashi
- Venue: Ishikawa Sports Center, Kanazawa
- Venue: Saga Prefecture General Gymnasium, Saga

Date	Time		Score		Set 1	Set 2	Set 3	Set 4	Set 5	Total	Report
19 Jan	12:00	Hisamitsu Springs	3–0	Toyota Auto Body Queenseis	25–20	25–17	25–23			75–60	
19 Jan	13:00	PFU BlueCats	0–3	Denso Airybees	18–25	22–25	19–25			59–75	
19 Jan	14:00	Saitama Ageo Medics	3–2	JT Marvelous	25–19	17–25	16–25	25–23	15–13	98–105	
19 Jan	15:00	Toray Arrows	3–2	Hitachi Rivale	25–23	25–18	23–25	22–25	15–7	110–98	
20 Jan	12:00	Hisamitsu Springs	3–2	Hitachi Rivale	23–25	25–17	23–25	25–15	15–12	111–94	
20 Jan	13:00	PFU BlueCats	1–3	Okayama Seagulls	15–25	20–25	25–23	21–25		81–98	
20 Jan	13:00	Saitama Ageo Medics	3–2	NEC Red Rockets	25–20	17–25	25–23	23–25	15–9	105–102	
20 Jan	15:00	Toyota Auto Body Queenseis	2–3	Toray Arrows	25–20	18–25	22–25	25–23	9–15	99–108	

==== Week 10 ====
- All times are Japan Standard Time (UTC+09:00).
- Venue: Momotaro Arena, Okayama
- Venue: Kawasaki City Todoroki Arena, Kawasaki

Date	Time		Score		Set 1	Set 2	Set 3	Set 4	Set 5	Total	Report
26 Jan	10:00	Toyota Auto Body Queenseis	3–0	PFU BlueCats	29–27	26–24	25–15			80–66	
26 Jan	12:00	NEC Red Rockets	3–2	Hitachi Rivale	25–20	23–25	25–23	20–25	15–10	108–103	
26 Jan	13:00	Okayama Seagulls	3–0	Kurobe AquaFairies	25–19	25–20	25–22			75–61	
26 Jan	15:00	Hisamitsu Springs	1–3	Saitama Ageo Medics	12–25	27–25	22–25	20–25		81–100	
26 Jan	15:00	JT Marvelous	3–1	Toray Arrows	25–16	25–19	24–26	25–22		99–83	
27 Jan	12:00	NEC Red Rockets	2–3	Hisamitsu Springs	25–23	24–26	25–23	18–25	13–15	105–112	
27 Jan	13:00	Okayama Seagulls	3–0	Toyota Auto Body Queenseis	25–17	25–18	25–21			75–56	
27 Jan	15:00	Hitachi Rivale	0–3	Denso Airybees	15–25	20–25	20–25			55–75	
27 Jan	16:00	Toray Arrows	3–1	PFU BlueCats	29–27	25–27	25–18	26–24		105–96	

==== Week 11 ====
- All times are Japan Standard Time (UTC+09:00).
- Venue: Kobe Green Arena, Kobe
- Venue: Wing Arena Kariya, Kariya
- Venue: Ishikawa Sports Center, Kanazawa
- Venue: Horaiya Koriyama General Gymnasium, Koriyama

Date	Time		Score		Set 1	Set 2	Set 3	Set 4	Set 5	Total	Report
2 Feb	12:00	Toyota Auto Body Queenseis	3–0	Kurobe AquaFairies	25–18	25–13	25–18			75–49	
2 Feb	12:00	Toray Arrows	3–0	Hitachi Rivale	29–27	26–24	25–17			80–68	
2 Feb	13:00	Denso Airybees	0–3	Okayama Seagulls	20–25	21–25	20–25			61–75	
2 Feb	13:00	PFU BlueCats	1–3	Saitama Ageo Medics	19–25	15–25	25–22	15–25		74–97	
2 Feb	15:00	JT Marvelous	2–3	NEC Red Rockets	25–19	17–25	25–22	21–25	13–15	101–106	
3 Feb	12:00	NEC Red Rockets	3–2	Toray Arrows	25–23	25–23	16–25	23–25	15–12	104–108	
3 Feb	13:00	Denso Airybees	2–3	Hisamitsu Springs	20–25	25–21	25–21	17–25	21–23	108–115	
3 Feb	15:00	JT Marvelous	3–1	Hitachi Rivale	25–22	26–24	22–25	25–18		98–89	

==== Week 12 ====
- All times are Japan Standard Time (UTC+09:00).
- Venue: Ukaruchan Arena, Otsu
- Venue: Kawasaki City Todoroki Arena, Kawasaki
- Venue: Kurobe-shi General Physical Education Center, Kurobe

Date	Time		Score		Set 1	Set 2	Set 3	Set 4	Set 5	Total	Report
9 Feb	11:00	Denso Airybees	0–3	Okayama Seagulls	20–25	22–25	15–25			57–75	
9 Feb	12:00	NEC Red Rockets	3–0	Hitachi Rivale	25–22	25–20	25–21			75–63	
9 Feb	13:00	JT Marvelous	3–0	Toyota Auto Body Queenseis	27–25	25–22	25–19			77–66	
9 Feb	13:00	Toray Arrows	3–1	Saitama Ageo Medics	25–21	25–17	14–25	25–22		89–85	
9 Feb	15:00	Kurobe AquaFairies	0–3	Hisamitsu Springs	20–25	23–25	22–25			65–75	
10 Feb	11:00	Toyota Auto Body Queenseis	3–0	PFU BlueCats	25–18	25–20	25–19			75–57	
10 Feb	13:00	Hisamitsu Springs	3–1	Okayama Seagulls	25–23	22–25	25–18	27–25		99–91	
10 Feb	15:00	Kurobe AquaFairies	0–3	JT Marvelous	21–25	13–25	19–25			53–75	

==== Week 13 ====
- All times are Japan Standard Time (UTC+09:00).
- Venue: Momotaro Arena, Okayama
- Venue: Ikenokawa Sakura Arena, Ibaraki
- Venue: Nishio Municipal Gymnasium, Nishio
- Venue: Ehime Prefecture Budokan, Matsuyama

Date	Time		Score		Set 1	Set 2	Set 3	Set 4	Set 5	Total	Report
16 Feb	13:00	Hitachi Rivale	1–3	Hisamitsu Springs	12–25	25–23	22–25	20–25		79–98	A B
16 Feb	13:00	Denso Airybees	3–2	JT Marvelous	25–21	25–21	23–25	21–25	15–11	109–103	A B
16 Feb	13:00	Okayama Seagulls	3–2	NEC Red Rockets	27–25	31–29	31–33	20–25	15–12	124–124	A B
16 Feb	14:00	Toray Arrows	3–0	Kurobe AquaFairies	25–16	25–22	25–11			75–49	A B
17 Feb	13:00	Denso Airybees	0–3	Toyota Auto Body Queenseis	18–25	20–25	17–25			55–75	A B
17 Feb	13:00	Okayama Seagulls	0–3	Saitama Ageo Medics	21–25	19–25	25–27			65–77	A B
17 Feb	14:00	Toray Arrows	3–2	PFU BlueCats	23–25	23–25	25–11	25–21	15–9	111–91	A B
17 Feb	16:00	NEC Red Rockets	3–1	Kurobe AquaFairies	25–22	25–18	24–26	25–23		99–89	A B

==== Week 14 ====
- All times are Japan Standard Time (UTC+09:00).
- Venue: Nippon Steel Sumikin Sakai Gymnasium, Sakai

Date	Time		Score		Set 1	Set 2	Set 3	Set 4	Set 5	Total	Report
23 Feb	12:00	Saitama Ageo Medics	2–3	Denso Airybees	25–20	25–23	16–25	21–25	12–15	99–108	A B
23 Feb	15:00	JT Marvelous	3–2	PFU BlueCats	25–18	19–25	23–25	25–20	15–8	107–96	A B

== Final stage ==
=== Final 8 ===
==== Standing Procedure ====
1. Total points (match points of final 8 and the ranking points of regular round)
  - Ranking points of regular round; From each Conference: 1st place – 6 point, 2nd place – 4 point, 3rd place – 2 point, 4th place – 0 point
2. In the event of a tie, the following first tiebreaker will apply: The ranking points of regular round
3. If teams are still tied after examining total points and the ranking points of regular round, then the FIVB will examine the results in order to break the tie in the following order:
  - The teams will be ranked by the most point gained per match in Final 8 as follows:
    - Match won 3–0 or 3–1: 3 points for the winner, 0 points for the loser
    - Match won 3–2: 2 points for the winner, 1 point for the loser
    - Match forfeited: 3 points for the winner, 0 points (0–25, 0–25, 0–25) for the loser
  - Total number of victories in Final 8 (matches won, matched lost)
  - Set quotient: if two or more teams are tied on total number of victories, they will be ranked by the quotient resulting from the division of the number of all set won by the number of all sets lost.
  - Points quotient: if the tie persists based on the set quotient, the teams will be ranked by the quotient resulting from the division of all points scored by the total of points lost during all sets.
  - If the tie persists based on the point quotient, the tie will be broken based on the team that won the match of the Round Robin Phase between the tied teams. When the tie in point quotient is between three or more teams, these teams ranked taking into consideration only the matches involving the teams in question.

==== Standings ====
Pos	Team	Pld	W	L	Pts	SW	SL	SR	SPW	SPL	SPR	Qualification
1	Hisamitsu Springs	7	7	0	27	21	5	4.200	632	528	1.197	Final
2	Toray Arrows	7	6	1	16	19	9	2.111	647	585	1.106	Final 3
3	JT Marvelous	7	3	4	15	13	13	1.000	574	568	1.011	Final 3
4	Toyota Auto Body Queenseis	7	4	3	13	14	13	1.077	618	615	1.005	
5	Denso Airybees	7	4	3	12	14	14	1.000	602	611	0.985	
6	NEC Red Rockets	7	1	6	10	8	20	0.400	579	634	0.913	
7	Saitama Ageo Medics	7	1	6	10	9	18	0.500	562	600	0.937	
8	Hitachi Rivale	7	2	5	7	21	17	1.235	558	631	0.884	

Updated to match(es) played on 24 March 2019. Source: Ranking Table

==== Results ====
2 March 2019; 11:01	Hisamitsu Springs	3–0	Denso Airybees	Fukuoka City General Gymnasium, Fukuoka; Attendance: 1,300
2 March 2019; 11:01	(25–19, 25–20, 25–23); Report A Report B			Fukuoka City General Gymnasium, Fukuoka; Attendance: 1,300

2 March 2019; 13:30	Toyota Auto Body Queenseis	3–1	Hitachi Rivale	Fukuoka City General Gymnasium, Fukuoka; Attendance: 1,300
2 March 2019; 13:30	(21-25, 25-22, 25-19, 25-19); Report A Report B			Fukuoka City General Gymnasium, Fukuoka; Attendance: 1,300

2 March 2019; 16:10	NEC Red Rockets	2–3	Toray Arrows	Fukuoka City General Gymnasium, Fukuoka; Attendance: 1,400
2 March 2019; 16:10	(25-23, 26-24, 19-25, 23-25, 12-15); Report A Report B			Fukuoka City General Gymnasium, Fukuoka; Attendance: 1,400

3 March 2019; 11:01	Hisamitsu Springs	3–1	Toyota Auto Body Queenseis	Fukuoka City General Gymnasium, Fukuoka; Attendance: 1,500
3 March 2019; 11:01	(25-23, 25-16, 29-31, 25-17); Report A Report B			Fukuoka City General Gymnasium, Fukuoka; Attendance: 1,500

3 March 2019; 13:40	JT Marvelous	3–0	Saitama Ageo Medics	Fukuoka City General Gymnasium, Fukuoka
3 March 2019; 13:40	(25-21, 25-18, 26-24); Report A Report B			Fukuoka City General Gymnasium, Fukuoka

3 March 2019; 16:00	Denso Airybees	3–1	Hitachi Rivale	Fukuoka City General Gymnasium, Fukuoka; Attendance: 1,600; Referees: Yuka Kitamura, Nana Yoshioka
3 March 2019; 16:00	(20-25, 25-18, 25-20, 25-18); Report A Report B			Fukuoka City General Gymnasium, Fukuoka; Attendance: 1,600; Referees: Yuka Kitamura, Nana Yoshioka

9 March 2019; 11:00	NEC Red Rockets	2–3	Toyota Auto Body Queenseis	Hanamaki Gymnasium, Iwate Prefecture; Attendance: 1,100; Referees: Nobuko Sasaki, Yuka Kitamura
9 March 2019; 11:00	(25-20, 25-16, 24-26, 22-25, 23-25); Report A Report B			Hanamaki Gymnasium, Iwate Prefecture; Attendance: 1,100; Referees: Nobuko Sasaki, Yuka Kitamura

9 March 2019; 12:00	Hisamitsu Springs	3–1	Toray Arrows	Hanamaki Gymnasium Annex, Iwate Prefecture; Attendance: 1,250; Referees: Takeshi Nishinakano, Nana Yoshioka
9 March 2019; 12:00	(22-25, 25-20, 25-19, 25-22); Report A Report B			Hanamaki Gymnasium Annex, Iwate Prefecture; Attendance: 1,250; Referees: Takeshi Nishinakano, Nana Yoshioka

9 March 2019; 14:05	JT Marvelous	2–3	Denso Airybees	Hanamaki Gymnasium, Iwate Prefecture; Attendance: 1,350; Referees: Atsushi Hattori, Akae Toshie
9 March 2019; 14:05	(18-25, 23-25, 25-17, 25-23, 8-15); Report A Report B			Hanamaki Gymnasium, Iwate Prefecture; Attendance: 1,350; Referees: Atsushi Hattori, Akae Toshie

9 March 2019; 14:30	Saitama Ageo Medics	2–3	Hitachi Rivale	Hanamaki Gymnasium Annex, Iwate Prefecture; Attendance: 1,150
9 March 2019; 14:30	(25-16, 25-18, 17-25, 22-25, 11-15); Report A Report B			Hanamaki Gymnasium Annex, Iwate Prefecture; Attendance: 1,150

10 March 2019; 12:00	NEC Red Rockets	1–3	JT Marvelous	Hanamaki Gymnasium, Iwate Prefecture; Attendance: 1,120
10 March 2019; 12:00	(17-25, 25-22, 16-25, 18-25); Report A Report B			Hanamaki Gymnasium, Iwate Prefecture; Attendance: 1,120

10 March 2019; 12:00	Hisamitsu Springs	Match 122	Hitachi Rivale	Hanamaki Gymnasium Annex, Iwate Prefecture; Attendance: 1,350
10 March 2019; 12:00	(25-19, 25-19, 23-25, 25-19); Report A Report B			Hanamaki Gymnasium Annex, Iwate Prefecture; Attendance: 1,350

10 March 2019; 14:36	Denso Airybees	1–3	Toyota Auto Body Queenseis	Hanamaki Gymnasium, Iwate Prefecture; Attendance: 1,350
10 March 2019; 14:36	(22-25, 16-25, 25-21, 14-25); Report A Report B			Hanamaki Gymnasium, Iwate Prefecture; Attendance: 1,350

10 March 2019; 14:50	Saitama Ageo Medics	0–3	Toray Arrows	Hanamaki Gymnasium Annex, Iwate Prefecture; Attendance: 1,350
10 March 2019; 14:50	(20-25, 19-25, 22-25); Report A Report B			Hanamaki Gymnasium Annex, Iwate Prefecture; Attendance: 1,350

16 March 2019; 11:00	NEC Red Rockets	0–3	Denso Airybees	Fukaya Gymnasium (Fukaya Big Turtle), Saitama Prefecture; Attendance: 1,410
16 March 2019; 11:00	(19-25, 17-25, 19-25 ) Report A Report B			Fukaya Gymnasium (Fukaya Big Turtle), Saitama Prefecture; Attendance: 1,410

16 March 2019; 12:00	Hisamitsu Springs	3–2	Saitama Ageo Medics	Fukuoka City Gymnasium (Teruha Sekisui House Arena), Fukuoka; Attendance: 1,500
16 March 2019; 12:00	(20-25, 25-18, 23-25, 25-17, 15-10); Report A Report B			Fukuoka City Gymnasium (Teruha Sekisui House Arena), Fukuoka; Attendance: 1,500

16 March 2019; 13:30	Hitachi Rivale	0–3	Toray Arrows	Fukaya Gymnasium (Fukaya Big Turtle), Saitama Prefecture; Attendance: 1,450
16 March 2019; 13:30	(17-25, 15-25, 16-25 ) Report A Report B			Fukaya Gymnasium (Fukaya Big Turtle), Saitama Prefecture; Attendance: 1,450

16 March 2019; 14:55	JT Marvelous	3–0	Toyota Auto Body Queenseis	Fukuoka City Gymnasium (Teruha Sekisui House Arena), Fukuoka; Attendance: 1,500
16 March 2019; 14:55	(25-20, 25-22, 26-24); Report A Report B			Fukuoka City Gymnasium (Teruha Sekisui House Arena), Fukuoka; Attendance: 1,500

17 March 2019; 11:00	NEC Red Rockets	3–2	Hitachi Rivale	Fukaya Gymnasium (Fukaya Big Turtle), Saitama Prefecture; Attendance: 1,390
17 March 2019; 11:00	(23-25, 18-25, 25-15, 25-12, 15-11); Report A Report B			Fukaya Gymnasium (Fukaya Big Turtle), Saitama Prefecture; Attendance: 1,390

17 March 2019; 12:00	Hisamitsu Springs	3–0	JT Marvelous	Fukuoka City Gymnasium (Teruha Sekisui House Arena), Fukuoka; Attendance: 1,800
17 March 2019; 12:00	(25-18, 25-22, 25-16); Report A Report B			Fukuoka City Gymnasium (Teruha Sekisui House Arena), Fukuoka; Attendance: 1,800

17 March 2019; 13:45	Denso Airybees	1–3	Toray Arrows	Fukaya Gymnasium (Fukaya Big Turtle), Saitama Prefecture; Attendance: 1,480
17 March 2019; 13:45	(25-22, 19-25, 23-25, 15-25); Report A Report B			Fukaya Gymnasium (Fukaya Big Turtle), Saitama Prefecture; Attendance: 1,480

17 March 2019; 14:30	Saitama Ageo Medics	0–3	Toyota Auto Body Queenseis	Fukuoka City Gymnasium (Teruha Sekisui House Arena), Fukuoka; Attendance: 1,700
17 March 2019; 14:30	(17-25, 26-28, 17-25); Report A Report B			Fukuoka City Gymnasium (Teruha Sekisui House Arena), Fukuoka; Attendance: 1,700

23 March 2019; 11:00	NEC Red Rockets	Match 133	Saitama Ageo Medics	Xebio Arena Sendai, Miyagi Prefecture; Attendance: 1,700
23 March 2019; 11:00	(18-25, 21-25, 19-25); Report A Report B			Xebio Arena Sendai, Miyagi Prefecture; Attendance: 1,700

23 March 2019; 13:30	Toyota Auto Body Queenseis	1–3	Toray Arrows	Xebio Arena Sendai, Miyagi Prefecture; Attendance: 1,544
23 March 2019; 13:30	(18-25, 25-19, 17-25, 23-25); Report A Report B			Xebio Arena Sendai, Miyagi Prefecture; Attendance: 1,544

23 March 2019; 16:20	JT Marvelous	0–3	Hitachi Rivale	Xebio Arena Sendai, Miyagi Prefecture; Attendance: 2,050
23 March 2019; 16:20	(20-25, 21-25, 20-25); Report A Report B			Xebio Arena Sendai, Miyagi Prefecture; Attendance: 2,050

24 March 2019; 11:00	NEC Red Rockets	0–3	Hisamitsu Springs	Xebio Arena Sendai, Miyagi Prefecture; Attendance: 1,323
24 March 2019; 11:00	(21-25, 23-25, 16-25); Report A Report B			Xebio Arena Sendai, Miyagi Prefecture; Attendance: 1,323

24 March 2019; 13:30	JT Marvelous	2–3	Toray Arrows	Xebio Arena Sendai, Miyagi Prefecture; Attendance: 2,018
24 March 2019; 13:30	(25-22, 25-18, 23-25, 26-28, 10-15); Report A Report B			Xebio Arena Sendai, Miyagi Prefecture; Attendance: 2,018

24 March 2019; 16:50	Saitama Ageo Medics	2–3	Denso Airybees	Xebio Arena Sendai, Miyagi Prefecture; Attendance: 1,316
24 March 2019; 16:50	(25-18, 19-25, 25-20, 25-27, 14-16); Report A Report B			Xebio Arena Sendai, Miyagi Prefecture; Attendance: 1,316

=== Final 3 ===
Team 1	Agg.	Team 2	1st leg	2nd leg
Toray Arrows	2–1	JT Marvelous	0–1	2–0

March 30, 2019; 15:08	Toray Arrows	2–3	JT Marvelous	Shimadzu Arena Kyoto; Attendance: 1,600; Referees: Yutaka Moriguchi, Hiroaki Takahashi
March 30, 2019; 15:08	(25-20, 24-26, 25-22, 18-25, 15-17); Report A Report B			Shimadzu Arena Kyoto; Attendance: 1,600; Referees: Yutaka Moriguchi, Hiroaki Takahashi

March 31, 2019; 15:08	Toray Arrows	3–1	JT Marvelous	Shimadzu Arena Kyoto; Attendance: 1,600; Referees: Hiroaki Takahashi, Yutaka Moriguchi
March 31, 2019; 15:08	(21-25, 25-21, 25-17, 25-22); Report A Report B			Shimadzu Arena Kyoto; Attendance: 1,600; Referees: Hiroaki Takahashi, Yutaka Moriguchi

March 31, 2019; 17:21	Toray Arrows	1–0	JT Marvelous	Shimadzu Arena Kyoto; Attendance: 1,600; Referees: Hiroaki Takahashi, Yutaka Moriguchi
March 31, 2019; 17:21	(25-20) Golden Set; Report A Report B			Shimadzu Arena Kyoto; Attendance: 1,600; Referees: Hiroaki Takahashi, Yutaka Moriguchi

=== Final ===
Final 3					Final
					1	Hisamitsu Springs	3	2	1
2	Toray Arrows	2	3	1	2	Toray Arrows	0	3	0
3	JT Marvelous	3	1	0

Team 1	Agg.	Team 2	1st leg	2nd leg
Hisamitsu Springs	2–1	Toray Arrows	1–0	1–1

April 6, 2019; 13:10	Hisamitsu Springs	3–0	Toray Arrows	Takeda Teva Ocean Arena, Nagoya, Aichi Prefecture; Attendance: 2050
April 6, 2019; 13:10	(25-21, 25-13, 27-25); Report A Report B			Takeda Teva Ocean Arena, Nagoya, Aichi Prefecture; Attendance: 2050

April 13, 2019; 14:10	Hisamitsu Springs	2–3	Toray Arrows	Musashino Forest Comprehensive Sports Plaza; Attendance: 4050
April 13, 2019; 14:10	(31-29, 19-25, 23-25, 25-23, 13-15); Report A Report B			Musashino Forest Comprehensive Sports Plaza; Attendance: 4050

April 13, 2019; 16:47	Hisamitsu Springs	1–0	Toray Arrows	Musashino Forest Comprehensive Sports Plaza; Attendance: 4050
April 13, 2019; 16:47	(25–18) Golden Set; Report A Report B			Musashino Forest Comprehensive Sports Plaza; Attendance: 4050

== All–Star Game ==
April 20, 2019; 14:00	Team Chiba (Eastern Conference)	0–3	Team V.Lea (Western Conference)	Urayasu Sports Park Gymnasium
April 20, 2019; 14:00	15-25 20-25 14-15			Urayasu Sports Park Gymnasium

== Final standing ==
Rank	Club
1st place, gold medalist(s)	Hisamitsu Springs
2nd place, silver medalist(s)	Toray Arrows
3rd place, bronze medalist(s)	JT Marvelous
4	Toyota Auto Body Queenseis
5	Denso Airybees
6	NEC Red Rockets
7	Saitama Ageo Medics
8	Hitachi Rivale
9	Okayama Seagulls
10	Kurobe AquaFairies
11	PFU BlueCats

Qualified for the 2020 Asian Women's Club Volleyball Championship

2018–19 V.League Division 1 Women's Champions

Team Roster
Setter: 2 Chizuru Koto, 11 Erika Sakae, 23 Minami Higane

Libero: 10 Kotoki Zayasu, 15 Yuka Taura(OH), 20 Sayaka Tsustui, 18 Mana Toe
MB: 4 Nana Iwasaka(C), 13 Kiyora Obikawa, 14 Fumika Moriya, 16 Foluke Akinradewo, 17 Asuka Hamamtsu, 21 Haruka Kanamori
OH: 3 Risa Shinnabe(OP), 6 Yuki Ishii, 8 Rika Nomoto, 12 Yuka Imamura, 22 Arisa Inoue, 24 Miyu Nakagawa, 25 Hikari Kato

Head coach
Shingo Sakai

== Awards ==
- Most valuable player
  Foluke Akinradewo
- Best setter
  Nanami Seki
- Best Middle Blockers
  Foluke Akinradewo
  Sinead Jack
- Fighting Spirit
  Jana Kulan
- Best Outside Hitters
  Brankica Mihajlovic
  Jana Kulan
- Best Opposite Hitter
  Risa Shinnabe
- Best libero
  Mako Kobata
- Best Newcomer
  Nanami Seki

== Statistics leaders ==
=== Regular round ===
The statistics of each group follows the vis reports. The statistics include 4 volleyball skills; serve, reception, spike, and block. The table below shows the top 10 ranked players in each skill plus top scorers at the completion of the Regular Round.

As of matches played on 23 February 2019--except for servers, which is too complicated to update.

Best Scorers
	Player	Club	Spikes	Blocks	Serves	Total
1	(Azerbaijan) Jana Kulan	Toray Arrows	465	57	22	544
2	(Serbia) Brankica Mihajlović	JT Marvelous	463	21	12	496
3	(Croatia) Katerina Barun	Saitama Ageo Medics	412	39	22	473
4	(Turkey) Neriman Özsoy	Toyota Auto Body Queenseis	407	32	10	449
5	(Japan) Ai Kurogo	Toray Arrows	314	20	22	356
6	(Japan) Mizuki Tanaka	JT Marvelous	320	18	15	353
7	(Trinidad and Tobago) Sinéad Jack	Denso Airybees	250	57	10	317
8	(Japan) Syuka Kaneda	Okayama Seagulls	296	12	8	316
9	(Japan) Hisae Watanabe	Hitachi Rivale	289	9	8	306
10	(Japan) Yuki Ishii	Hisamitsu Springs	278	12	13	303

Best Spikers
	Player	Club	Spikes	Faults	Shots	Total	%
1	(United States) Foluke Akinradewo	Hisamitsu Springs	212	11	132	355	59.72
2	(Trinidad and Tobago) Sinead Jack	Denso Airybees	191	15	129	335	57.02
3	(Philippines) Jaja Santiago	Saitama Ageo Medics	159	8	133	300	53.00
4	(Croatia) Katerina Barun	Saitama Ageo Medics	370	46	370	786	47.07
5	(United States) Jennifer Doris	PFU BlueCats	159	13	175	347	45.82
6	(Azerbaijan) Jana Kulan	Toray Arrows	409	48	454	911	44.90
7	(Japan) Aya Watanabe	Toyota Auto Body Queenseis	93	13	103	209	44.50
8	(Japan) Mai Irisawa	Hitachi Rivale	125	27	131	283	44.17
9	(Belgium) Freya Aelbrecht	Kurobe AquaFairies	156	16	184	356	43.82
10	(Serbia) Brankica Mihajlović	JT Marvelous	426	76	478	980	43.47

Best Blockers
	Player	Club	Matches	Sets	Blocks	Avg
1	(United States) Foluke Akinradewo	Hisamitsu Springs	16	61	53	0.87
2	(Trinidad and Tobago) Sinead Jack	Denso Airybees	20	71	57	0.80
3	(Japan) Nana Iwasaka	Hisamitsu Springs	20	73	58	0.79
3	(Japan) Erika Araki	Toyota Auto Body Queenseis	16	57	45	0.79
5	(Azerbaijan) Jana Kulan	Toray Arrows	20	79	57	0.72
6	(Japan) Mai Irisawa	Hitachi Rivale	20	79	51	0.65
7	(United States) Jennifer Doris	PFU BlueCats	20	76	46	0.61
8	(Japan) Kaho Ōno	Toray Arrows	20	76	43	0.57
9	(Japan) Kana Ōno	NEC Red Rockets	20	64	33	0.52
9	(Japan) Risa Shinnabe	Hisamitsu Springs	18	64	33	0.52

Best Servers
	Player	Club	Aces	Faults	Hits	Total	Eff.
1	(Japan) Erika Araki	Toyota Auto Body Queenseis	16	20	166	202	14.11
2	(Japan) Ai Kurogo	Toray Arrows	21	17	230	268	13.99
3	(Japan) Mai Irisawa	Hitachi Rivale	22	40	165	227	13.88
4	(Azerbaijan) Jana Kulan	Toray Arrows	17	26	196	239	13.08
5	(Japan) Yurie Nabeya	Denso Airybees	13	13	170	196	12.76
6	(Japan) Aya Watanabe	Toyota Auto Body Queenseis	14	12	175	201	12.44
7	(Japan) Naoko Shimahata	PFU BlueCats	7	12	78	97	12.37
8	(Japan) Misaki Inoue	Saitama Ageo Medics	10	18	206	234	12.18
9	(Philippines) Jaja Santiago	Saitama Ageo Medics	17	28	196	241	12.14
10	(Japan) Mizuki Tanaka	JT Marvelous	15	16	231	262	11.74

Best Receivers
	Player	Club	Excellents	Good	Faults	Total	%
1	(Japan) Risa Shinnabe	Hisamitsu Springs	136	47	45	228	70.0
2	(Japan) Yurika Baba	Kurobe AquaFairies	109	30	44	183	67.8
3	(Japan) Misato Sakakibara	Toyota Auto Body Queenseis	120	54	46	220	66.8
4	(Japan) Nanami Wasai	Kurobe AquaFairies	295	100	127	522	66.1
5	(Japan) Mana Toe	Hisamitsu Springs	154	73	67	294	64.8
6	(Japan) Mako Kobata	JT Marvelous	168	85	72	325	64.8
7	(Japan) Yūka Meguro	JT Marvelous	111	58	51	220	63.6
8	(Japan) Yuki Ishii	Hisamitsu Springs	229	83	122	434	62.3
9	(Japan) Akane Yamagishi	Saitama Ageo Medics	131	60	70	261	61.7
10	(Japan) Mami Uchiseto	Toyota Auto Body Queenseis	175	93	99	367	60.4

== See also ==
- 2018–19 V.League Division 1 Men's
