= 2017–18 V.Premier League Women's =

- League: V.Premier League
- Duration: October 21, 2017 – March 17, 2018
- Teams: 8

Seasons
- ← 2016–17 2018–19 →

The Volleyball 2017–18 V.Premier League Women's was the 24th tournament of the V.Premier League which was held from October 21, 2017 – March 4, 2018.

== Teams ==
=== Personnel and sponsoring ===
V.Premier League Women's personnel and sponsoring
| Team | Head coach | Team captain | Colors | Main Sponsor |
|---|---|---|---|---|
| Ageo Medics | (Japan) Toshiaki Yoshida | (Japan) Yuko Maruyama | | Ageo Medical Group |
| Denso Airybees | (Japan) Gen Kawakita | (Japan) Ishida Mizuho | | Denso |
| JT Marvelous | (Japan) Tomoko Yoshihhara | (Japan) Mai Okumura | | Japan Tobacco Ltd. |
| Hisamitsu Springs | (Japan) Shingo Sakai | (Japan) Erika Sakae | | Hisamitsu Pharmaceutical |
| Hitachi Rivale | (Japan) Hiroyuki Kai | (Japan) Miya Sato | | Hitachi Automotive Systems |
| NEC Red Rockets | (Japan) Akinori Yamada | (Japan) Mizuki Yanagita | | NEC |
| Toray Arrows | (Japan) Koichiro Kanno | (Japan) Kanami Tashiro | | Toray Industries |
| Toyota Auto Body Queenseis | (Japan) Asako Tajimi | (Japan) Saori Takahashi | | Toyota Auto Body |

== Season standing procedure ==
1. Match points
2. Number of matches won
3. Sets ratio
4. Points ratio
5. Result of the last match between the tied teams

Match won 3–0 or 3–1: 3 match points for the winner, 0 match points for the loser
Match won 3–2: 2 match points for the winner, 1 match point for the loser

== League table ==
=== Standings ===
| Pos | Team | Pld | W | L | Pts | SW | SL | SR | Qualification |
|---|---|---|---|---|---|---|---|---|---|
| 1 | Hisamitsu Springs | 21 | 21 | 0 | 61 | 63 | 11 | 5.727 | Final 6 |
| 2 | JT Marvelous | 21 | 13 | 8 | 40 | 50 | 34 | 1.471 | Final 6 |
| 3 | Toyota Auto Body Queenseis | 21 | 11 | 10 | 32 | 41 | 40 | 1.025 | Final 6 |
| 4 | Denso Airybees | 21 | 11 | 10 | 32 | 42 | 41 | 1.024 | Final 6 |
| 5 | NEC Red Rockets | 21 | 8 | 13 | 26 | 36 | 45 | 0.800 | Final 6 |
| 6 | Toray Arrows | 21 | 8 | 13 | 24 | 33 | 47 | 0.702 | Final 6 |
| 7 | Ageo Medics | 21 | 7 | 14 | 22 | 32 | 48 | 0.667 | |
| 8 | Hitachi Rivale | 21 | 5 | 16 | 15 | 25 | 56 | 0.446 | |

Source: vleague.or.jp

=== Result table ===
1st leg
| Home \ Away | HIS | TAB | JT | AGE | DEN | TOR | NEC | HIT |
|---|---|---|---|---|---|---|---|---|
| Hisamitsu Springs | | 3–0 | 3–2 | 3–1 | 3–1 | 3–0 | 3–0 | 3–0 |
| Toyota Auto Body Queenseis | 0–3 | | 0–3 | 1–3 | 3–1 | 3–0 | 3–0 | 3–0 |
| JT Marvelous | 2–3 | 3–0 | | 2–3 | 3–2 | 3–1 | 1–3 | 3–2 |
| Ageo Medics | 1–3 | 3–1 | 3–2 | | 3–1 | 1–3 | 3–0 | 0–3 |
| Denso Airybees | 1–3 | 1–3 | 2–3 | 1–3 | | 3–1 | 3–2 | 3–1 |
| Toray Arrows | 0–3 | 0–3 | 1–3 | 3–1 | 1–3 | | 3–0 | 3–2 |
| NEC Red Rockets | 0–3 | 0–3 | 3–1 | 3–0 | 2–3 | 0–3 | | 1–3 |
| Hitachi Rivale | 0–3 | 0–3 | 2–3 | 0–3 | 1–3 | 2–3 | 3–1 | |

Legend: Blue = home team win; Red = away team win.

2nd leg
| Home \ Away | HIS | TAB | JT | AGE | DEN | TOR | NEC | HIT |
|---|---|---|---|---|---|---|---|---|
| Hisamitsu Springs | | 3–0 | 3–1 | 3–1 | 3–1 | 3–1 | 3–0 | 3–1 |
| Toyota Auto Body Queenseis | 0–3 | | 0–3 | 3–2 | 0–3 | 2–3 | 3–2 | 2–3 |
| JT Marvelous | 1–3 | 3–0 | | 3–0 | 3–0 | 3–1 | 3–1 | 3–0 |
| Ageo Medics | 1–3 | 2–3 | 0–3 | | 1–3 | 3–0 | 0–3 | 3–0 |
| Denso Airybees | 1–3 | 3–0 | 0–3 | 3–1 | | 3–1 | 3–1 | 2–3 |
| Toray Arrows | 0–3 | 3–2 | 1–3 | 0–3 | 3–1 | | 0–3 | 3–1 |
| NEC Red Rockets | 0–3 | 2–3 | 1–3 | 3–0 | 1–3 | 3–0 | | 3–1 |
| Hitachi Rivale | 1–3 | 3–2 | 0–3 | 0–3 | 3–2 | 1–3 | 1–3 | |

Legend: Blue = home team win; Red = away team win.

3rd leg
| Home \ Away | HIS | TAB | JT | AGE | DEN | TOR | NEC | HIT |
|---|---|---|---|---|---|---|---|---|
| Hisamitsu Springs | | 3–2 | 3–0 | 3–0 | 3–0 | 3–0 | 3–0 | 3–0 |
| Toyota Auto Body Queenseis | 2–3 | | 1–3 | 3–2 | 3–0 | 3–2 | 3–1 | 3–0 |
| JT Marvelous | 0–3 | 3–1 | | 3–2 | 1–3 | 3–0 | 2–3 | 2–3 |
| Ageo Medics | 0–3 | 2–3 | 2–3 | | 0–3 | 1–3 | 3–2 | 3–0 |
| Denso Airybees | 0–3 | 0–3 | 3–1 | 3–0 | | 3–2 | 3–2 | 3–0 |
| Toray Arrows | 0–3 | 2–3 | 0–3 | 3–1 | 2–3 | | 0–3 | 1–3 |
| NEC Red Rockets | 0–3 | 1–3 | 3–2 | 2–3 | 2–3 | 3–0 | | 3–2 |
| Hitachi Rivale | 0–3 | 0–3 | 3–2 | 0–3 | 0–3 | 3–1 | 2–3 | |

Legend: Blue = home team win; Red = away team win.

== Results ==
=== 1 leg ===
==== Matchday 1 ====
| Date | Time | | Score | | Set 1 | Set 2 | Set 3 | Set 4 | Set 5 | Total | Report |
|---|---|---|---|---|---|---|---|---|---|---|---|
| 21 Oct | 13:05 | NEC Red Rockets | 0–3 | Hisamitsu Springs | 14–25 | 19–25 | 9–25 | | | 42–75 | |
| 21 Oct | 15:15 | Denso Airybees | 1–3 | Ageo Medics | 22–25 | 25–23 | 21–25 | 22–25 | | 90–98 | |
| 22 Oct | 13:00 | Hitachi Rivale | 2–3 | JT Marvelous | 25–23 | 25–15 | 26–28 | 16–25 | 14–16 | 106–107 | |
| 22 Oct | 16:50 | Body Queenseis | 3–0 | Toray Arrows | 25–19 | 25–13 | 25–22 | | | 75–54 | |

==== Matchday 2 ====
| Date | Time | | Score | | Set 1 | Set 2 | Set 3 | Set 4 | Set 5 | Total | Report |
|---|---|---|---|---|---|---|---|---|---|---|---|
| 28 Oct | 13:00 | NEC Red Rockets | 3–0 | Ageo Medics | 25–16 | 25–17 | 25–20 | | | 75–53 | |
| 28 Oct | 13:00 | Hisamitsu Springs | 3–2 | JT Marvelous | 23–25 | 23–25 | 28–26 | 25–13 | 15–13 | 114–102 | |
| 28 Oct | 14:50 | Toray Arrows | 1–3 | Denso Airybees | 25–20 | 24–26 | 19–25 | 23–25 | | 91–96 | |
| 28 Oct | 15:05 | Hitachi Rivale | 0–3 | Body Queenseis | 15–25 | 25–27 | 26–28 | | | 66–80 | |

==== Matchday 3 ====
| Date | Time | | Score | | Set 1 | Set 2 | Set 3 | Set 4 | Set 5 | Total | Report |
|---|---|---|---|---|---|---|---|---|---|---|---|
| 29 Oct | 13:00 | Body Queenseis | 1–3 | Ageo Medics | 14–25 | 22–25 | 25–21 | 24–26 | | 85–97 | |
| 29 Oct | 13:00 | Hisamitsu Springs | 3–1 | Denso Airybees | 21–25 | 25–22 | 25–20 | 25–19 | | 96–86 | |
| 29 Oct | 15:30 | JT Marvelous | 3–1 | Toray Arrows | 25–20 | 17–25 | 25–16 | 25–23 | | 92–84 | |
| 29 Oct | 15:45 | Hitachi Rivale | 3–1 | NEC Red Rockets | 25–23 | 18–25 | 25–19 | 25–23 | | 93–90 | |

==== Matchday 4 ====
| Date | Time | | Score | | Set 1 | Set 2 | Set 3 | Set 4 | Set 5 | Total | Report |
|---|---|---|---|---|---|---|---|---|---|---|---|
| 4 Nov | 13:00 | NEC Red Rockets | 3–1 | JT Marvelous | 23–25 | 25–20 | 25–19 | 25–16 | | 98–80 | |
| 4 Nov | 13:00 | Hitachi Rivale | 0–3 | Ageo Medics | 20–25 | 18–25 | 23–25 | | | 61–75 | |
| 4 Nov | 15:00 | Toray Arrows | 0–3 | Hisamitsu Springs | 16–25 | 22–25 | 16–25 | | | 54–75 | |
| 4 Nov | 15:42 | Denso Airybees | 1–3 | Body Queenseis | 25–19 | 19–25 | 21–25 | 22–25 | | 87–94 | |

==== Matchday 5 ====
| Date | Time | | Score | | Set 1 | Set 2 | Set 3 | Set 4 | Set 5 | Total | Report |
|---|---|---|---|---|---|---|---|---|---|---|---|
| 5 Nov | 13:00 | NEC Red Rockets | 0–3 | Body Queenseis | 21–25 | 23–25 | 22–25 | | | 66–75 | |
| 5 Nov | 13:00 | Hisamitsu Springs | 3–0 | Hitachi Rivale | 25–18 | 25–15 | 25–16 | | | 75–49 | |
| 5 Nov | 15:00 | Toray Arrows | 3–1 | Ageo Medics | 19–25 | 25–23 | 25–18 | 25–10 | | 94–76 | |
| 5 Nov | 15:20 | Denso Airybees | 2–3 | JT Marvelous | 25–16 | 25–11 | 20–25 | 23–25 | 11–15 | 104–92 | |

==== Matchday 6 ====
| Date | Time | | Score | | Set 1 | Set 2 | Set 3 | Set 4 | Set 5 | Total | Report |
|---|---|---|---|---|---|---|---|---|---|---|---|
| 11 Nov | 13:00 | NEC Red Rockets | 0–3 | Toray Arrows | 21–25 | 13–25 | 18–25 | | | 52–75 | |
| 11 Nov | 13:00 | Ageo Medics | 1–3 | Hisamitsu Springs | 25–20 | 25–27 | 18–25 | 18–25 | | 86–97 | |
| 11 Nov | 15:00 | Denso Airybees | 3–1 | Hitachi Rivale | 25–11 | 25–21 | 22–25 | 25–18 | | 97–75 | |
| 11 Nov | 15:50 | Body Queenseis | 0–3 | JT Marvelous | 19–25 | 21–25 | 15–25 | | | 55–75 | |

==== Matchday 7 ====
| Date | Time | | Score | | Set 1 | Set 2 | Set 3 | Set 4 | Set 5 | Total | Report |
|---|---|---|---|---|---|---|---|---|---|---|---|
| 12 Nov | 13:00 | Hitachi Rivale | 2–3 | Toray Arrows | 15–25 | 25–16 | 23–25 | 25–19 | 13–15 | 101–100 | |
| 12 Nov | 13:00 | JT Marvelous | 2–3 | Ageo Medics | 25–19 | 25–22 | 15–25 | 17–25 | 15–11 | 97–102 | |
| 12 Nov | 15:40 | NEC Red Rockets | 2–3 | Denso Airybees | 25–19 | 24–26 | 23–25 | 25–21 | 10–15 | 107–106 | |
| 12 Nov | 15:50 | Body Queenseis | 0–3 | Hisamitsu Springs | 17–25 | 19–25 | 12–25 | | | 48–75 | |

=== 2 leg ===
==== Matchday 8 ====
| Date | Time | | Score | | Set 1 | Set 2 | Set 3 | Set 4 | Set 5 | Total | Report |
|---|---|---|---|---|---|---|---|---|---|---|---|
| 18 Nov | 13:00 | Hisamitsu Springs | 3–1 | Denso Airybees | 25–20 | 22–25 | 25–23 | 25–18 | | 97–86 | |
| 18 Nov | 13:00 | Body Queenseis | 2–3 | Toray Arrows | 23–25 | 25–21 | 25–23 | 22–25 | 16–18 | 111–112 | |
| 18 Nov | 15:30 | NEC Red Rockets | 3–0 | Ageo Medics | 25–21 | 25–18 | 25–20 | | | 75–59 | |
| 18 Nov | 16:05 | Hitachi Rivale | 0–3 | JT Marvelous | 21–25 | 21–25 | 19–25 | | | 61–75 | |

==== Matchday 9 ====
| Date | Time | | Score | | Set 1 | Set 2 | Set 3 | Set 4 | Set 5 | Total | Report |
|---|---|---|---|---|---|---|---|---|---|---|---|
| 19 Nov | 13:00 | Denso Airybees | 3–1 | Ageo Medics | 21–25 | 25–14 | 25–21 | 25–18 | | 96–78 | |
| 19 Nov | 13:00 | Toray Arrows | 1–3 | JT Marvelous | 14–25 | 25–23 | 18–25 | 24–26 | | 81–99 | |
| 19 Nov | 15:40 | Body Queenseis | 2–3 | Hitachi Rivale | 20–25 | 26–24 | 25–18 | 22–25 | 10–15 | 103–107 | |
| 19 Nov | 15:48 | NEC Red Rockets | 0–3 | Hisamitsu Springs | 24–26 | 24–26 | 19–25 | | | 67–77 | |

==== Matchday 10 ====
| Date | Time | | Score | | Set 1 | Set 2 | Set 3 | Set 4 | Set 5 | Total | Report |
|---|---|---|---|---|---|---|---|---|---|---|---|
| 25 Nov | 13:00 | Ageo Medics | 1–3 | Hisamitsu Springs | 13–25 | 26–24 | 21–25 | 25–27 | | 85–101 | |
| 25 Nov | 13:00 | NEC Red Rockets | 1–3 | JT Marvelous | 19–25 | 23–25 | 25–22 | 21–25 | | 88–97 | |
| 25 Nov | 15:35 | Hitachi Rivale | 1–3 | Toray Arrows | 21–25 | 25–20 | 21–25 | 25–27 | | 92–97 | |
| 25 Nov | 15:40 | Denso Airybees | 3–0 | Body Queenseis | 25–22 | 26–24 | 25–20 | | | 76–66 | |

==== Matchday 11 ====
| Date | Time | | Score | | Set 1 | Set 2 | Set 3 | Set 4 | Set 5 | Total | Report |
|---|---|---|---|---|---|---|---|---|---|---|---|
| 26 Nov | 13:00 | Ageo Medics | 0–3 | Toray Arrows | 17–25 | 22–25 | 22–25 | | | 61–75 | |
| 26 Nov | 13:00 | Body Queenseis | 3–2 | NEC Red Rockets | 18–25 | 25–18 | 25–22 | 23–25 | 15–8 | 106–98 | |
| 26 Nov | 15:55 | Hisamitsu Springs | 3–1 | Hitachi Rivale | 19–25 | 25–19 | 25–16 | 25–15 | | 94–75 | |
| 26 Nov | 15:05 | Denso Airybees | 0–3 | JT Marvelous | 15–25 | 22–25 | 21–25 | | | 58–75 | |

==== Matchday 12 ====
| Date | Time | | Score | | Set 1 | Set 2 | Set 3 | Set 4 | Set 5 | Total | Report |
|---|---|---|---|---|---|---|---|---|---|---|---|
| 2 Dec | 13:00 | NEC Red Rockets | 3–0 | Toray Arrows | 25–21 | 25–20 | 25–14 | | | 75–55 | |
| 2 Dec | 13:00 | JT Marvelous | 1–3 | Hisamitsu Springs | 26–24 | 22–25 | 16–25 | 23–25 | | 87–99 | |
| 2 Dec | 15:00 | Hitachi Rivale | 3–2 | Denso Airybees | 26–24 | 16–25 | 17–25 | 25–17 | 15–13 | 99–104 | |
| 2 Dec | 15:35 | Body Queenseis | 3–2 | Ageo Medics | 22–25 | 26–24 | 16–25 | 25–20 | 15–13 | 104–107 | |

==== Matchday 13 ====
| Date | Time | | Score | | Set 1 | Set 2 | Set 3 | Set 4 | Set 5 | Total | Report |
|---|---|---|---|---|---|---|---|---|---|---|---|
| 3 Dec | 13:00 | Toray Arrows | 3–1 | Denso Airybees | 25–17 | 23–25 | 25–22 | 25–9 | | 98–73 | |
| 3 Dec | 13:00 | Hisamitsu Springs | 3–0 | Body Queenseis | 25–22 | 25–20 | 25–13 | | | 75–55 | |
| 3 Dec | 15:00 | JT Marvelous | 3–0 | Ageo Medics | 25–16 | 25–21 | 25–18 | | | 75–55 | |
| 3 Dec | 15:30 | Hitachi Rivale | 1–3 | NEC Red Rockets | 15–25 | 25–21 | 16–25 | 18–25 | | 74–96 | |

==== Matchday 14 ====
| Date | Time | | Score | | Set 1 | Set 2 | Set 3 | Set 4 | Set 5 | Total | Report |
|---|---|---|---|---|---|---|---|---|---|---|---|
| 9 Dec | 13:00 | NEC Red Rockets | 1–3 | Denso Airybees | 15–25 | 25–21 | 22–25 | 22–25 | | 84–96 | |
| 9 Dec | 13:00 | Hisamitsu Springs | 3–1 | Toray Arrows | 22–25 | 25–23 | 25–19 | 25–16 | | 97–83 | |
| 9 Dec | 15:40 | Ageo Medics | 3–0 | Hitachi Rivale | 25–17 | 25–18 | 25–22 | | | 75–57 | |
| 9 Dec | 15:45 | JT Marvelous | 3–0 | Body Queenseis | 25–22 | 25–22 | 25–21 | | | 75–65 | |

=== 3 leg ===
==== Matchday 15 ====
| Date | Time | | Score | | Set 1 | Set 2 | Set 3 | Set 4 | Set 5 | Total | Report |
|---|---|---|---|---|---|---|---|---|---|---|---|
| 10 Dec | 13:00 | Toray Arrows | 0–3 | JT Marvelous | 22–25 | 18–25 | 14–25 | | | 54–75 | |
| 10 Dec | 13:08 | NEC Red Rockets | 3–2 | Hitachi Rivale | 32–30 | 20–25 | 26–28 | 25–14 | 15–9 | 118–106 | |
| 10 Dec | 16:15 | Hisamitsu Springs | 3–2 | Body Queenseis | 25–16 | 27–29 | 25–19 | 28–30 | 15–6 | 120–100 | |
| 10 Dec | 15:10 | Ageo Medics | 0–3 | Denso Airybees | 29–31 | 20–25 | 22–25 | | | 71–81 | |

==== Matchday 16 ====
| Date | Time | | Score | | Set 1 | Set 2 | Set 3 | Set 4 | Set 5 | Total | Report |
|---|---|---|---|---|---|---|---|---|---|---|---|
| 6 Jan | 13:00 | JT Marvelous | 3–1 | Body Queenseis | 25–18 | 18–25 | 25–19 | 25–23 | | 93–85 | |
| 6 Jan | 13:00 | NEC Red Rockets | 2–3 | Denso Airybees | 18–25 | 25–19 | 24–26 | 25–21 | 12–15 | 104–106 | |
| 6 Jan | 15:00 | Ageo Medics | 1–3 | Toray Arrows | 23–25 | 25–20 | 14–25 | 22–25 | | 84–95 | |
| 6 Jan | 15:00 | Hisamitsu Springs | 3–0 | Hitachi Rivale | 25–20 | 25–22 | 25–22 | | | 75–64 | |

==== Matchday 17 ====
| Date | Time | | Score | | Set 1 | Set 2 | Set 3 | Set 4 | Set 5 | Total | Report |
|---|---|---|---|---|---|---|---|---|---|---|---|
| 7 Jan | 13:00 | Ageo Medics | 2–3 | JT Marvelous | 25–23 | 16–25 | 25–17 | 19–25 | 13–15 | 98–105 | |
| 7 Jan | 13:00 | Denso Airybees | 3–0 | Hitachi Rivale | 25–22 | 25–21 | 25–16 | | | 75–59 | |
| 7 Jan | 15:00 | Body Queenseis | 3–2 | Toray Arrows | 25–15 | 20–25 | 25–15 | 18–25 | 15–11 | 103–91 | |
| 7 Jan | 15:00 | NEC Red Rockets | 0–3 | Hisamitsu Springs | 17–25 | 25–27 | 15–25 | | | 57–77 | |

==== Matchday 18 ====
| Date | Time | | Score | | Set 1 | Set 2 | Set 3 | Set 4 | Set 5 | Total | Report |
|---|---|---|---|---|---|---|---|---|---|---|---|
| 13 Jan | 13:00 | Ageo Medics | 2–3 | Body Queenseis | 21–25 | 19–25 | 25–23 | 25–9 | 14–16 | 104–98 | |
| 13 Jan | 13:00 | Toray Arrows | 2–3 | Denso Airybees | 21–25 | 25–22 | 25–11 | 21–25 | 20–22 | 112–105 | |
| 13 Jan | 15:00 | Hisamitsu Springs | 3–0 | JT Marvelous | 25–18 | 25–22 | 25–21 | | | 75–61 | |

==== Matchday 19 ====
| Date | Time | | Score | | Set 1 | Set 2 | Set 3 | Set 4 | Set 5 | Total | Report |
|---|---|---|---|---|---|---|---|---|---|---|---|
| 14 Jan | 13:00 | Ageo Medics | 3–0 | Hitachi Rivale | 25–22 | 25–22 | 25–19 | | | 75–63 | |
| 14 Jan | 13:00 | Hisamitsu Springs | 3–0 | Denso Airybees | 25–19 | 25–16 | 25–17 | | | 75–52 | |

==== Matchday 20 ====
| Date | Time | | Score | | Set 1 | Set 2 | Set 3 | Set 4 | Set 5 | Total | Report |
|---|---|---|---|---|---|---|---|---|---|---|---|
| 20 Jan | 13:00 | Hitachi Rivale | 3–2 | JT Marvelous | 16–25 | 26–24 | 25–19 | 25–27 | 15–12 | 107–107 | |
| 20 Jan | 13:00 | NEC Red Rockets | 3–0 | Toray Arrows | 25–13 | 25–17 | 25–23 | | | 75–53 | |
| 20 Jan | 15:00 | Body Queenseis | 3–0 | Denso Airybees | 25–15 | 25–22 | 25–21 | | | 75–58 | |

==== Matchday 21 ====
| Date | Time | | Score | | Set 1 | Set 2 | Set 3 | Set 4 | Set 5 | Total | Report |
|---|---|---|---|---|---|---|---|---|---|---|---|
| 21 Jan | 13:00 | Body Queenseis | 3–0 | Hitachi Rivale | 25–16 | 25–14 | 25–19 | | | 75–49 | |
| 21 Jan | 15:00 | NEC Red Rockets | 2–3 | Ageo Medics | 25–12 | 25–20 | 21–25 | 29–31 | 11–15 | 111–103 | |

==== Matchday 22 ====
| Date | Time | | Score | | Set 1 | Set 2 | Set 3 | Set 4 | Set 5 | Total | Report |
|---|---|---|---|---|---|---|---|---|---|---|---|
| 27 Jan | 13:00 | NEC Red Rockets | 1–3 | Body Queenseis | 26–28 | 25–16 | 16–25 | 20–25 | | 87–94 | |
| 27 Jan | 13:00 | Ageo Medics | 0–3 | Hisamitsu Springs | 16–25 | 21–25 | 21–25 | | | 58–75 | |
| 27 Jan | 15:00 | JT Marvelous | 1–3 | Denso Airybees | 27–25 | 23–25 | 20–25 | 19–25 | | 89–100 | |
| 27 Jan | 15:00 | Toray Arrows | 1–3 | Hitachi Rivale | 19–25 | 25–23 | 19–25 | 18–25 | | 81–98 | |

==== Matchday 23 ====
| Date | Time | | Score | | Set 1 | Set 2 | Set 3 | Set 4 | Set 5 | Total | Report |
|---|---|---|---|---|---|---|---|---|---|---|---|
| 28 Jan | 13:00 | Toray Arrows | 0–3 | Hisamitsu Springs | 18–25 | 15–25 | 15–25 | | | 48–75 | |
| 28 Jan | 13:08 | JT Marvelous | 2–3 | NEC Red Rockets | 23–25 | 25–19 | 28–26 | 22–25 | 11–15 | 109–110 | |

== Playoff ==
=== Final 6 ===
==== Final 6 standing procedure ====
1. Total points (match points of Final 6 and the ranking points of regular season)
2. The rank of regular season

Ranking points of regular season

- 1st place - 5 points
- 2nd place - 4 points
- 3rd place - 3 points
- 4th place - 2 points
- 5th place - 1 point
- 6th place - 0 point

Match won 3–0 or 3–1: 3 match points for the winner, 0 match points for the loser
Match won 3–2: 2 match points for the winner, 1 match point for the loser

==== Standings ====
| Pos | Team | Pld | W | L | Pts | SW | SL | SR | Qualification |
|---|---|---|---|---|---|---|---|---|---|
| 1 | JT Marvelous | 5 | 5 | 0 | 18 | 15 | 4 | 3.750 | Final |
| 2 | Hisamitsu Springs | 5 | 4 | 1 | 16 | 12 | 8 | 1.500 | Final 3 |
| 3 | Toyota Auto Body Queenseis | 5 | 2 | 3 | 11 | 11 | 10 | 1.100 | Final 3 |
| 4 | Denso Airybees | 5 | 2 | 3 | 7 | 8 | 11 | 0.727 | |
| 5 | NEC Red Rockets | 5 | 1 | 4 | 5 | 7 | 12 | 0.583 | |
| 6 | Toray Arrows | 5 | 1 | 4 | 3 | 5 | 13 | 0.385 | |

==== Result ====
===== Matchday 1 =====
| Date | Time | | Score | | Set 1 | Set 2 | Set 3 | Set 4 | Set 5 | Total | Report |
|---|---|---|---|---|---|---|---|---|---|---|---|
| 10 Feb | 11:00 | Hisamitsu Springs | 3–2 | Body Queenseis | 25–23 | 17–25 | 22–25 | 25–22 | 18–16 | 107–111 | |
| 10 Feb | 11:00 | JT Marvelous | 3–1 | Toray Arrows | 18–25 | 25–22 | 25–15 | 25–23 | | 93–85 | |
| 10 Feb | 11:00 | Denso Airybees | 3–2 | NEC Red Rockets | 23–25 | 21–25 | 25–21 | 25–22 | 15–9 | 109–102 | |
| 11 Feb | 13:00 | Hisamitsu Springs | 3–1 | Toray Arrows | 25–22 | 22–25 | 25–16 | 25–19 | | 97–82 | |
| 11 Feb | 13:00 | JT Marvelous | 3–2 | Body Queenseis | 25–22 | 25–16 | 15–25 | 10–25 | 15–11 | 90–99 | |

===== Matchday 2 =====
| Date | Time | | Score | | Set 1 | Set 2 | Set 3 | Set 4 | Set 5 | Total | Report |
|---|---|---|---|---|---|---|---|---|---|---|---|
| 17 Feb | 11:00 | Hisamitsu Springs | 3–1 | NEC Red Rockets | 25–18 | 19–25 | 25–20 | 25–23 | | 94–86 | |
| 17 Feb | 11:00 | JT Marvelous | 3–0 | Denso Airybees | 25–23 | 25–15 | 25–18 | | | 75–56 | |
| 17 Feb | 11:00 | Body Queenseis | 1–3 | Toray Arrows | 25–23 | 19–25 | 23–25 | 16–25 | | 83–98 | |
| 18 Feb | 13:00 | Hisamitsu Springs | 3–1 | Denso Airybees | 25–19 | 18–25 | 30–28 | 25–15 | | 98–87 | |
| 18 Feb | 13:00 | JT Marvelous | 3–1 | NEC Red Rockets | 23–25 | 25–22 | 26–24 | 25–17 | | 99–88 | |

===== Matchday 3 =====
| Date | Time | | Score | | Set 1 | Set 2 | Set 3 | Set 4 | Set 5 | Total | Report |
|---|---|---|---|---|---|---|---|---|---|---|---|
| 24 Feb | 11:00 | Body Queenseis | 3–0 | NEC Red Rockets | 25–14 | 25–21 | 25–21 | | | 75–56 | |
| 24 Feb | 11:00 | Denso Airybees | 3–0 | Toray Arrows | 25–21 | 29–27 | 25–19 | | | 79–67 | |
| 24 Feb | 11:00 | Hisamitsu Springs | 0–3 | JT Marvelous | 22–25 | 20–25 | 17–25 | | | 59–75 | |
| 25 Feb | 13:00 | NEC Red Rockets | 3–0 | Toray Arrows | 25–19 | 25–16 | 25–21 | | | 75–56 | |
| 25 Feb | 13:00 | Body Queenseis | 3–1 | Denso Airybees | 25–20 | 25–22 | 16–25 | 25–13 | | 91–80 | |

=== Final 3 / final ===
| Final 3 | | | | | Final |
| | | | | | 1 | JT Marvelous | 0 | 0 | – |
| 2 | Hisamitsu Springs | 3 | 3 | – | 2 | Hisamitsu Springs | 3 | 3 | – |
| 3 | Toyota Auto Body Queenseis | 0 | 0 | – |

==== Final 3 ====
| Date | Time | | Score | | Set 1 | Set 2 | Set 3 | Set 4 | Set 5 | Total | Report |
|---|---|---|---|---|---|---|---|---|---|---|---|
| 3 Mar | 13:08 | Hisamitsu Springs | 3–0 | Toyota Auto Body Queenseis | 25–22 | 25–23 | 25–22 | | | 75–67 | |
| 4 Mar | 12:08 | Hisamitsu Springs | 3–0 | Toyota Auto Body Queenseis | 25–17 | 25–20 | 25–12 | | | 75–49 | |

==== Final ====
| Date | Time | | Score | | Set 1 | Set 2 | Set 3 | Set 4 | Set 5 | Total | Report |
|---|---|---|---|---|---|---|---|---|---|---|---|
| 10 Mar | 13:08 | JT Marvelous | 0–3 | Hisamitsu Springs | 9–25 | 20–25 | 21–25 | | | 50–75 | |
| 17 Mar | 15:08 | JT Marvelous | 0–3 | Hisamitsu Springs | 14–25 | 21–25 | 20–25 | | | 55–75 | |

== Final standing ==
| Rank | Team |
|---|---|
| 1st place, gold medalist(s) | Hisamitsu Springs |
| 2nd place, silver medalist(s) | JT Marvelous |
| 3rd place, bronze medalist(s) | Toyota Auto Body Queenseis |
| 4 | Denso Airybees |
| 5 | NEC Red Rockets |
| 6 | Toray Arrows |
| 7 | Ageo Medics |
| 8 | Hitachi Rivale |

| Qualified for the Asian Championship |

2017-2018 V.Premier League Women's Champions
Hisamitsu Springs

Team Roster
Miyu Nagaoka, Chizuru Kotō, Risa Shinnabe, Nana Iwasaka, Yuki Ishii, Rika Nomoto, Kotoki Zayasu, Erika Sakae, Yūka Imamura, Kiyora Obikawa, Fumika Moriya, Yūka Taura, Foluke Akinradewo, Asuka Hamamatsu, Mana Toe, Akane Ukishima, Sayaka Tsutsui, Haruka kanamori, Arisa Inoue, Minami Higane, Miyu Nakagawa, Hikari Katō
Head coach
Shingo Sakai

== Awards ==
- Most Valuable Player
  (Japan) Yuki Ishii (Hisamitsu)
- Excellent Player
  (Serbia) Brankica Mihajlović (JT)
- Allstar Team
  - (Japan) Yuki Ishii (Hisamitsu)
  - (Serbia) Brankica Mihajlović (JT)
  - (Turkey) Neriman Gençyürek (TAB)
  - (United States) Foluke Akinradewo (Hisamitsu)
  - (Japan) Erika Araki (TAB)
  - (Japan) Misaki Tanaka (JT)
  - (Japan) Mako Kobata (JT)
- Best coach
  (Japan) Shingo Sakai (Hisamitsu)
- New face award
  (Japan) Ai Kurogo (Toray)
- Best scorer
  - (Turkey) Neriman Gençyürek (TAB) 580points
- Spike award
  - (United States) Foluke Akinradewo (Hisamitsu) 60.3%
- Block award
  - (Japan) Erika Araki (TAB) 0.85points/set
- Service award
  - (Japan) Yuka Kanasugi (JT) 17.4%
- Reception award
  - (Japan) Risa Shinnabe (Hisamitsu) 63.0%
- Receive award
  - (Japan) Yuki Ishii (Hisamitsu)
- Special award (played more than 230 matches)
  - (Japan) Moemi Tōi (Hitachi)

== See also ==
- 2017–18 V.Premier League Men's
