= Kurobe AquaFairies Toyama =

Japanese volleyball club

Kurobe AquaFairies
- Founded: 1998
- Ground: Kurobe City, Toyama; Japan
- Manager Head Coach: (Japan) Koichi Iida (Japan) Gen Kawakita
- Captain: Anri Nakamura
- League: SV.League
- 2025-26: 11th place
- Website: Club home page

Uniforms
Home	Away

Kurobe AquaFairies (KUROBEアクアフェアリーズ, KUROBE Akuafearīzu) is a women's volleyball team based in Kurobe, Toyama, Japan. It plays in SV.League. The club was founded in 1998. It is operated by Kurobe city Athletic Association.

== History ==
- It was founded in 1998.
- It was promoted to V.Challenge League in 2001.
- It was promoted to V.League Division 1 Women in 2018.

== Honours ==
- V.Challenge League
  - Champion(1) - 2004

== League results ==
League		Position	Teams	Matches	Win	Lose
V1.League	3rd (2000–01)	8th	8	14	0	14
V1.League	4th (2001–02)	7th	7	12	1	11
V1.League	5th (2002–03)	3rd	8	14	9	5
V1.League	6th (2003–04)	Champion	7	12	11	1
V1.League	7th (2004–05)	3rd	8	14	10	4
V1.League	8th (2005–06)	4th	8	14	8	6
V・challenge	2006-07	6th	8	14	5	9
V・challenge	2007-08	8th	8	14	1	13
V・challenge	2008-09	7th	10	18	8	10
V・challenge	2009-10	5th	12	16	8	8
V・challenge	2010-11	5th	12	18	11	7
V・challenge	2011-12	3rd	12	22	16	6
V・challenge	2012-13	5th	10	18	9	9
V・challenge	2013-14	4th	10	18	10	8
V・challenge	2014-15	4th	10	18	12	6
V・challenge 1	2015-16	5th	8	21	10	11
V・challenge 1	2016-17	5th	8	20	8	12
V・challenge 1	2017-18	3rd	7	18	12	6
V.League Division 1 (V1)	2018–19	10th	11	20	2	18
V.League Division 1 (V1)	2019-20	10th	12	21	1	20
V.League Division 1 (V1)	2020-21	12th	12	20	4	16
V.League Division 1 (V1)	2021-22	12th	12	33	3	30
SV.League	2024-25	12th	14	44	15	29
SV.League	2025-26	11th	14	44	17	37

== Current squad ==
2026/27 squad as of November 2026

- Head coach: (Japan) Gen Kawakita

No.	Name	Position	Date of birth	Height (m)
1	(Japan) Rino Furuichi	Outside Hitter	18 June 1999 (age 27)	1.70 m (5 ft 7 in)
2	(Japan) Rimi Kaneda	Outside Hitter	6 October 1998 (age 28)	1.78 m (5 ft 10 in)
3	(Japan) Kanami Ong	Setter	25 March 1991 (age 35)	1.73 m (5 ft 8 in)
4	(Japan) Minami Yasuda	Setter	12 December 2001 (age 24)	1.79 m (5 ft 10 in)
5	(Japan) Aoi Hata	Outside Hitter	7 December 2002 (age 23)	1.70 m (5 ft 7 in)
6	(Japan) Ayana Tanabe	Outside Hitter	6 June 2001 (age 25)	1.71 m (5 ft 7 in)
7	(Russia) Anastasia Lyashko	Middle Blocker	17 February 2005 (age 21)	1.97 m (6 ft 6 in)
8	(Japan) Maiko Yoda	Libero	3 June 2000 (age 26)	1.60 m (5 ft 3 in)
9	(Japan) Yuka Yoshimura	Outside Hitter	5 February 2003 (age 23)	1.77 m (5 ft 10 in)
10	(Japan) Maki Yamaguchi (c)	Middle Blocker	31 March 1999 (age 27)	1.75 m (5 ft 9 in)
11	(Japan) Miyu Nakagawa	Outside Hitter	8 January 2000 (age 26)	1.83 m (6 ft 0 in)
12	(Japan) Akane Ukishima	Opposite	10 June 1996 (age 30)	1.72 m (5 ft 8 in)
14	(Japan) Waka Yada	Middle Blocker	28 April 2006 (age 20)	1.86 m (6 ft 1 in)
15	(Japan) Hitomi Kozono	Middle Blocker	11 May 2003 (age 23)	1.81 m (5 ft 11 in)
16	(China) Gong Xiangyu	Opposite Hitter	21 April 1997 (age 29)	1.89 m (6 ft 2 in)
17	(Japan) Ayami Urayama	Libero	1 July 2001 (age 25)	1.65 m (5 ft 5 in)
21	(Japan) Kokoro Inada	Setter	14 December 2002 (age 23)	1.65 m (5 ft 5 in)
22	(Japan) Ciara Hirano	Outside Hitter	22 August 2006 (age 20)	1.76 m (5 ft 9 in)
24	(Japan) Kanako Nakayama	Middle Blocker	25 July 1999 (age 27)	1.82 m (6 ft 0 in)
77	(United States) Giovanna Day	Outside Hitter	13 June 1998 (age 28)	1.88 m (6 ft 2 in)

== Former players ==
Domestic players

Japan

- Hiroko Hakuta (2002–2006)
- Hokaku Cho (2008–2009)
- Mayumi Kosuge (2011–2012)
- Ayano Inishi (2009–2012)
- Yuki Tanaka (2008–2013)
- Nao Murakami (2007–2013)
- Nanami Wasai (2014–2019) Transferred to PFU BlueCats
- Rina Hiratani (2014–2019)
- Natsuno Kurami (2014–2019)
- Natsumi Watabiki (2017–2020) Transferred to PFU BlueCats
- Ranna Shiraiwa (2018–2020) Transferred to Forest Leaves Kumamoto (ja)
- Saki Maruyama (2014–2021)
- Yurika Banba (2017–2021)

Foreign players

Belgium

- Freya Aelbrecht (2018–2019)

Germany

- Lena Stigrot (2024–)

Philippines

- Aleona Denise Manabat (2019–2020)
- Maddie Madayag (2024–2025)

United States

- Juliann Faucette (2017–2018)
- Simone Lee (2019–2021)

Thailand

- Pimpichaya Kokram (2021–2024)

Turkey

- Tuğba Şenoğlu (2022–2023)
