= Miyu Nakagawa =

Japanese volleyball player (born 2000)

Personal information
- Full name: Miyu Nakagawa
- Nickname: Yuzu
- Nationality: Japanese
- Born: 8 January 2000 (age 26) Okazaki City, Aichi, Japan
- Height: 1.83 m (6 ft 0 in)
- Weight: 65 kg (143 lb)
- Spike: 306 cm (120 in)
- Block: 300 cm (118 in)

Volleyball information
- Position: Outside hitter / Opposite
- Current club: (Japan) Kurobe AquaFairies
- Number: 11 (club)

Career
- Years: Team
- 2015–2018 2018–2025 2025-present: (Japan) Higashi Kyushu Ryukoku High School (Japan) Saga Hisamitsu Springs (Japan) Kurobe AquaFairies

National team
- Years: Team
- 2014–2023: Japan
Honours
Women's volleyball
Representing Japan
Asian Championship
Gold medal – first place	2019 Seoul	Team
Bronze medal – third place	2023 Nakhon Ratchasima	Team
Asian Games
Silver medal – second place	2022 Hangzhou	Team
Montreux Volley Masters
Silver medal – second place	2019 Switzerland	Team
World U21 Championship
Gold medal – first place	2019 Mexico	Team
Bronze medal – third place	2017 Mexico	Team
AVC Cup
Gold medal – first place	2022 Pasig	Team
Silver medal – second place	2018 Nakhon Ratchasima	Team
Asian U19 Championship
Gold medal – first place	2018 Bac Ninh	Team
Asian U17 Championship
Gold medal – first place	2014 Nakhon Ratchasima	Team

Miyu Nakagawa (中川 美柚, Nakagawa Miyu; born 8 January 2000) is a Japanese professional volleyball player. She plays in the SV.League for Kurobe AquaFairies.

== Career ==
=== Early Years ===
In third year of junior high school, Nakagawa was selected to represent Japan at the 2014 Asian U17 Championship in Thailand where the team won the championship. She was named as the best middle blocker.

In her third year of high school, she was selected to represent Japan at the 2017 World U21 Championship in Mexico. The team finished with the bronze medal.

In 2019, she was selected again as a member for 2019 World U21 Championship where the team won the championship and making it her consecutive World U21 Championship medal.

=== Professional Years ===
In January 2018, it was announced that she would join Hisamitsu Springs.

In 2019, she was selected as a member of Japan women's national volleyball team for the first time. She was selected for the 2019 Montreux Volley Masters where the team finished as the runner-up.

In 2020, her third season with Hisamitsu, she played as an opposite hitter. In an interview, she said that matches and practice are completely different, that she learns a lot from matches, and that winning matches builds her confidence.

In 2022, she was selected as a member of Japan women's national volleyball team and participated at the 2022 AVC Cup where the team won the championship for the first time.

On May 4, 2025, it was announced that she would leaving Hisamitsu at the end of 2024–25 season. On May 26 the same year, it was announced that she would join Kurobe AquaFairies.

== Award ==
=== Individual ===
- 2014 Asian U17 Championship - Best Middle Blocker
- 2017-18 All Japan High School Championship - Best Outside Hitter

=== High School Team ===
- 2017-18 All Japan High School Championship - - Runner-up, with Higashi Kyushu Ryukoku High School

=== Club Team ===
- 2017-18 Kurowashiki All Japan Volleyball Tournament - - Runner-up, with Hisamitsu Springs
- 2017–18 V.Premier League Women's - - Champion, with Hisamitsu Springs
- 2019 AVC Champions League - - Bronze Medal, with Hisamitsu Springs
- 2018-19 Empress' Cup All Japan Volleyball Championship - - Champion, with Hisamitsu Springs
- 2018-19 V.League Division 1 Women's - - Champion, with Hisamitsu Springs
- 2021-22 Empress' Cup All Japan Volleyball Championship - - Champion, with Hisamitsu Springs
- 2021-22 V.League Division 1 Women's - - Champion, with Hisamitsu Springs
- 2022-23 Empress' Cup All Japan Volleyball Championship - - Bronze Medal, with Hisamitsu Springs
- 2022-23 V.League Division 1 Women's - - Bronze Medal, with Hisamitsu Springs
- 2023-24 Kurowashiki All Japan Volleyball Tournament - - Bronze Medal, with Hisamitsu Springs
- 2023-24 Empress' Cup All Japan Volleyball Championship - - Runner-up, with Hisamitsu Springs
- 2024-25 Empress' Cup All Japan Volleyball Championship - - Runner-up, with Saga Hisamitsu Springs
- 2024-25 SV.League Women's - - Bronze Medal, with Saga Hisamitsu Springs

=== National Team ===
- (Thailand) 2014 Asian U17 Championship - - Champion
- (Mexico) 2017 World U21 Championship - - Bronze Medal
- (Thailand) 2018 AVC Cup - - Runner-up
- (Vietnam) 2018 Asian U19 Championship - - Champion
- (South Korea) 2019 Asian Championship - - Champion
- (Mexico) 2019 World U21 Championship - - Champion
- (Switzerland) 2019 Montreux Volley Masters - - Runner-up
- (Philippines) 2022 AVC Cup - - Champion
- (China) 2022 Asian Games - - Runner-up
- (Thailand) 2023 Asian Championship - - Bronze Medal

== See also ==
- 2018 Asian Women's U17 Volleyball Championship
