= PFU BlueCats =

Japanese volleyball club

PFU BlueCats Ishikawa Kahoku
- Founded: 1980
- Ground: Kahoku, Ishikawa; Japan
- Manager Head coach: (Japan) Haisuke Manabu (Japan) Baba Daitaku
- Captain: Tamaki Matsui
- League: SV.League
- 2025-26: 3th place
- Website: Club home page
- Championships: 2009 V.Challenge League

Uniforms
Home	Away

PFU BlueCats (PFUブルーキャッツ, PFU Burūkyattsu) is a women's volleyball team based in Kahoku city, Ishikawa, Japan. It plays in the SV.League having been promoted for the first time for the 2018–2019 season. The club was founded in 1980. The owner of the team is PFU Limited.

== History ==
- Founded in 1980.
- Promoted to V.Challenge League in 2002.
- Won the V.Challenge League in 2009.
- Promoted to V.Premier League in 2016.

== Honors ==
=== Team ===
Season	Conference	Title	Source
2004	V1• League	Runners Up	
2006	V1• League	Runners Up	
2007	V• Challenge	Runners Up	
2008	V• Challenge	Runners Up	
2009	V• Challenge	Champions	
2015	V• Challenge	Runners Up	
2016	V• Challenge 1	Runners Up	
2017	V• Challenge 1	Runners Up	

== League results ==
League		Position	Teams	Matches	Win	Lose
V1.League	5th (2002–03)	7th	8	14	2	12
V1.League	6th (2003–04)	Runner-up	7	12	9	3
V1.League	7th (2004–05)	4th	8	14	9	5
V1.League	8th (2005–06)	Runner-up	8	14	12	2
V・challenge	2006-07	Runner-up	8	14	13	1
V・challenge	2007-08	Runner-up	8	14	10	4
V・challenge	2008-09	Champion	10	18	15	3
V・challenge	2009-10	7th	12	16	9	7
V・challenge	2010-11	3rd	12	18	14	4
V・challenge	2011-12	5th	12	22	13	9
V・challenge	2012-13	4th	10	18	10	8
V・challenge	2013-14	3rd	10	18	13	5
V・challenge	2014-15	Runner-up	10	18	15	3
V.Challenge 1	2015-16	Runner-up	8	21	17	4
V.Premier	2016-17	8th	8	21	3	18
V.Challenge 1	2017-18	Runner-Up	8	18	16	2
V.League Division 1 (V1)	2018–19	11th	11	20	0	20
V.League Division 1 (V1)	2019-20	11th	12	21	4	17
V.League Division 1 (V1)	2020-21	9th	12	17	4	13
SV.League	2024-25	10th	14	44	19	25
SV.League	2025-26	3th	14	44	31	13

== Current roster ==
2026/27 Squad as of November 2026

- Head coach: (Japan) Baba Daitaku

PFU BlueCats
No.	Name	Position	Date of birth	Height
1	(Japan) Mami Yokota	Middle Blocker	10 December 1997 (age 28)	1.78 m (5 ft 10 in)
2	(Japan) Kaede Goto	Libero	2 August 2002 (age 24)	1.59 m (5 ft 3 in)
3	(Japan) Shuri Kurata	Setter	22 November 2000 (age 25)	1.69 m (5 ft 7 in)
4	(Japan) Reina Kawasaki	Outside Hitter	25 October 2001 (age 25)	1.77 m (5 ft 10 in)
5	(Japan) Kiiro Omura	Outside Hitter	26 September 2000 (age 26)	1.70 m (5 ft 7 in)
6	(Japan) Aya Hosonuma	Middle Blocker	25 May 2000 (age 26)	1.80 m (5 ft 11 in)
7	(Japan) Ririka Funada	Libero	25 May 2001 (age 25)	1.60 m (5 ft 3 in)
8	(Japan) Kisa Okuma	Outside Hitter	7 March 2004 (age 22)	1.73 m (5 ft 8 in)
9	(Japan) Miyu Kawazoe	Outside Hitter	22 September 2001 (age 25)	1.70 m (5 ft 7 in)
10	(Japan) Mayu Nagatomo	Middle Blocker	1 October 2001 (age 25)	1.76 m (5 ft 9 in)
11	(Japan) Tamaki Matsui (c)	Setter	10 January 1998 (age 28)	1.70 m (5 ft 7 in)
12	(Japan) Anna Uemura	Outside Hitter	23 March 2006 (age 20)	1.66 m (5 ft 5 in)
13	(Japan) Yuki Nishikawa	Outside Hitter	4 September 2000 (age 26)	1.80 m (5 ft 11 in)
14	(Japan) Ropez Liza	Middle Blocker	6 February 2003 (age 23)	1.75 m (5 ft 9 in)
15	(Thailand) Thatdao Nuekjang	Middle Blocker	3 February 1994 (age 32)	1.85 m (6 ft 1 in)
17	(United States) Jaali Winters	Outside Hitter	26 July 1997 (age 29)	1.90 m (6 ft 3 in)
23	(Japan) Melissa Valdes	Outside Hitter	8 October 2002 (age 24)	1.85 m (6 ft 1 in)

== Imports ==
Year	Number	Player	Country
2012	9	Yuranny Romanna	Colombia
2013	2	Jennifer Doris	United States
2014	2	Jennifer Doris	United States
2015	2	Jennifer Doris	United States
2016	2	Jennifer Doris	United States
2017	2	Jennifer Doris	United States
2018	2	Jennifer Doris	United States
2018	19	Chatchu-on Moksri	Thailand
2019	2	Jennifer Doris	United States
2019	19	Thanacha Sooksod	Thailand
2020	4	Hathairat Jarat	Thailand
2020	18	Roslandy Acosta	Venezuela
2021	12	Trần Thị Thanh Thúy	Vietnam
2022	12	Trần Thị Thanh Thúy	Vietnam
2022	18	Roslandy Acosta	Venezuela
2023	12	Trần Thị Thanh Thúy	Vietnam
2023	33	Daly Santana	Puerto Rico
2024	1	Natthanicha Jaisaen	Thailand
2024	15	Thatdao Nuekjang	Thailand
2024	22	Kashauna Williams	United States
2025	15	Thatdao Nuekjang	Thailand

== Team staffs ==
2024 Edition

Job	Name	Country
Representative	Haisuke Manabu	Japan
General Manager	Futoshi Teramawari	Japan
Assistant General Manager	Kentaro Kaneko	Japan
Head Coach	Baba Daitaku	Japan
Coach	Koji Iwai	Japan
Trainer	Hiroyuki Watanabe	Japan
Trainer	Yuki Maezawa	Japan
Analyst	Toma Sugaya	Japan
Manager	Aki Nakahara	Japan
Interpreter	Machiho Tachibana	Japan
Team Doctor	Taisuke Hasegawa	Japan

== Former players ==
Local players

Japan

- Yuki Sasaki
- Chizuru Kotō (2001–2009)
- Haruka Sunada (2009–2014)
- Maiko Kano (2015–2018)
- Amiyu Ikeda
- Yuna Miyajima
- Mami Matsunaga
- Risa Ohkubo
- Mana Tokinaga
- Kayoko Tsukahara
- Kotomi Matsushita
- Miku Suzuki
- Seina Kato
- Azusa Shimizu
- Megumi Funasaki
- Chika Mochida
- Mao Kawakami
- Eri Iyonaga
- Maiko Sakashita
- Yoshiko Kano
- Sayaka Ohbo
- Chiaki Takahashi
- Rino Makita
- Rina Sho (2017–2019)
- Aimi Akiyami (2016–2019)
- Saori Uda (2015–2020)
- Mai Shimizu (2014–2020)
- Minori Wada (2018–2020)
- Sayaka Tsutsui (2019–2020)
- Yukiko Ebata (2015–2021)
- Nao Tsuga (2017–2021)
- Naoko Shimahata (2016–2021)

Foreign Player

Colombia

- Yurrany Romana

Thailand

- Chatchu-on Moksri (2018-2019)
- Thanacha Sooksod (2019-2020)
- Thatdao Nuekjang (2024-)
- Natthanicha Jaisaen (2024-)

United States

- Jennifer Doris (2013–2020)
- Kashauna Williams (2024-)

Vietnam

- Trần Thị Thanh Thúy (2021-2024)

Venezuela

- Roslandy Acosta (2020–2021)
