= Yuki Tanaka (volleyball) =

Japanese volleyball player

Personal information
- Full name: Yuki Tanaka
- Nickname: Yuki
- Born: August 19, 1981 (age 45) Kawaguchi city, Saitama, Japan
- Height: 1.75 m (5 ft 9 in)
- Weight: 63 kg (139 lb)
- Spike: 293 cm (115 in)

Volleyball information
- Position: Wing Spiker, Libero

National team
- Years: Team
- –: Japan

Yuki Tanaka (田中 弓貴, Tanaka Yuki; born 19 August 1981) is a Japanese volleyball player who played for Kurobe AquaFairies. She served as the captain of the team from 2009.

== Profiles ==
- The former name is Yuki Sugawara.
- Her younger sister is the same team, Kurobe AquaFairies.
- She can play at any positions but setter.

== Clubs ==
- Kasukabe Kyoei High School → Hisamitsu Springs (2000–2002) → Mobara Arcas (2002–2006) → Hitachi Sawa Rivale (2006–2008) → Kurobe AquaFairies (2008-2012)

== National team ==
- (Japan) 2008 - 1st AVC Women's Cup
