= Island City, Fukuoka =

Artificial island in Fukuoka

Coordinates: 33°39′57″N 130°24′47.8″E

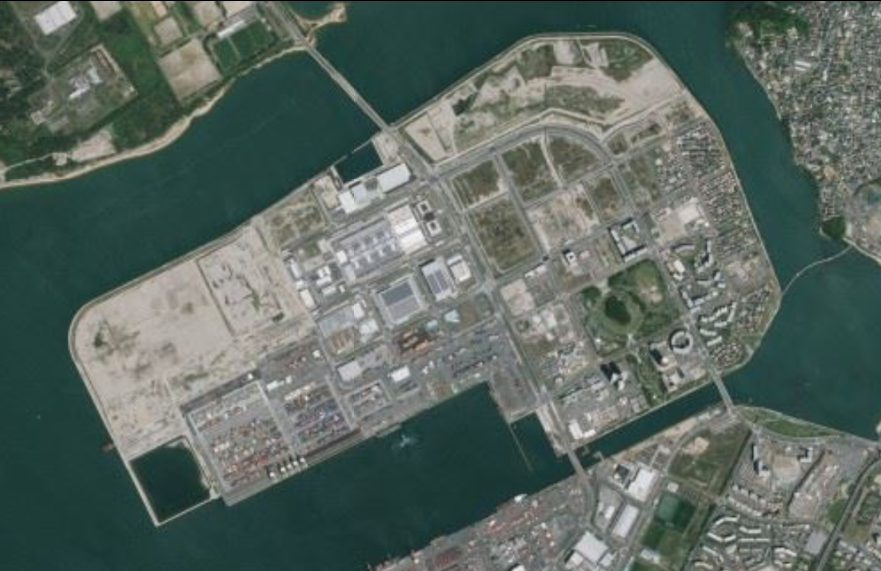
- Interactive map of Island City, Fukuoka

Geography
- Area: 401.3 ha (992 acres)

Island City (アイランドシティ) is an artificial island in Hakata Bay, Fukuoka, Japan. Island Tower Sky Club and Teriha Sekisui House Arena are on this island.

== Construction ==
The first building constructed on the island was a covered area and walkways in the island's Central Park designed by Japanese architect Toyo Ito.

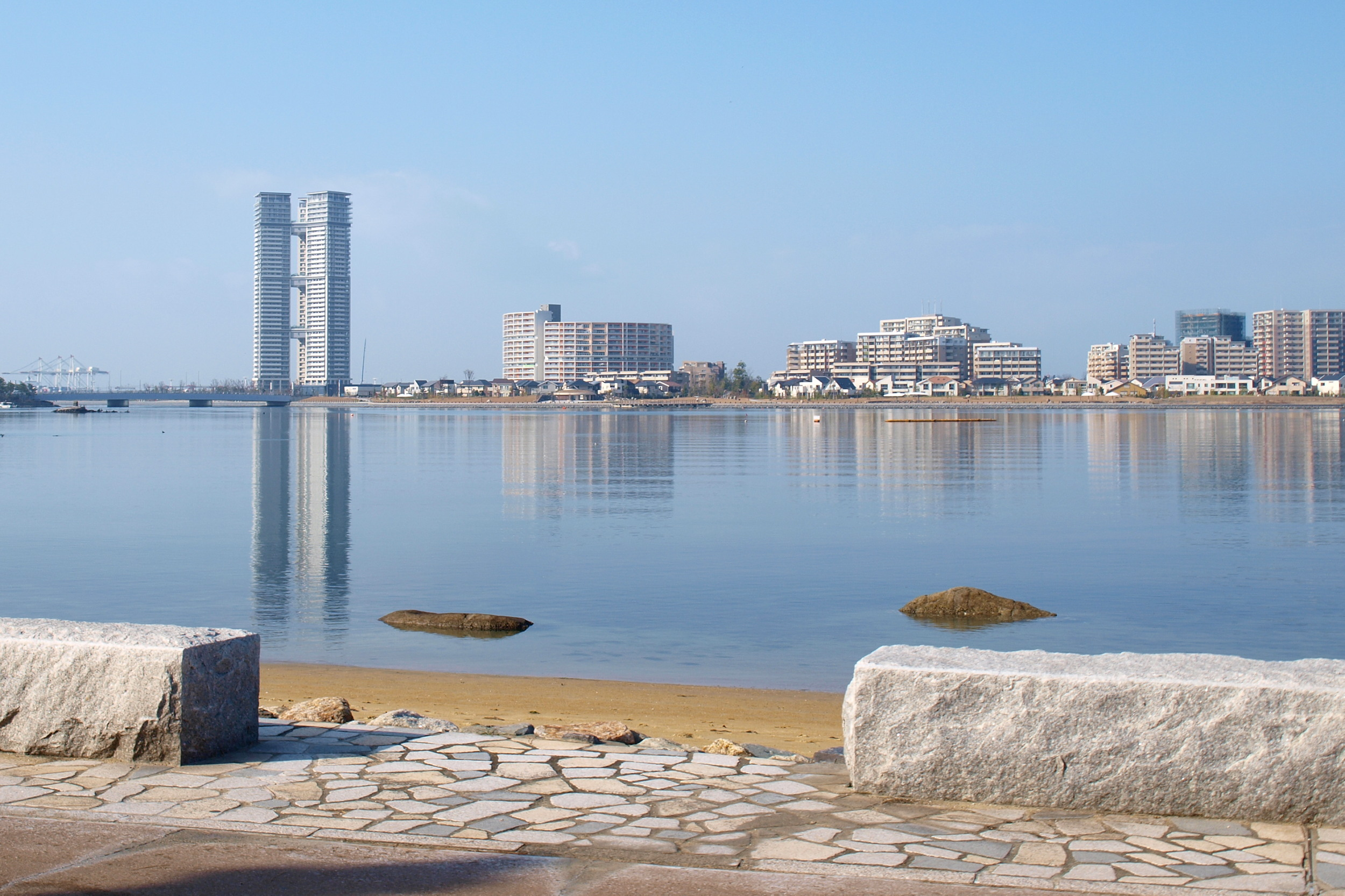
Island City
