= Freya Aelbrecht =

Belgian volleyball player (born 1990)

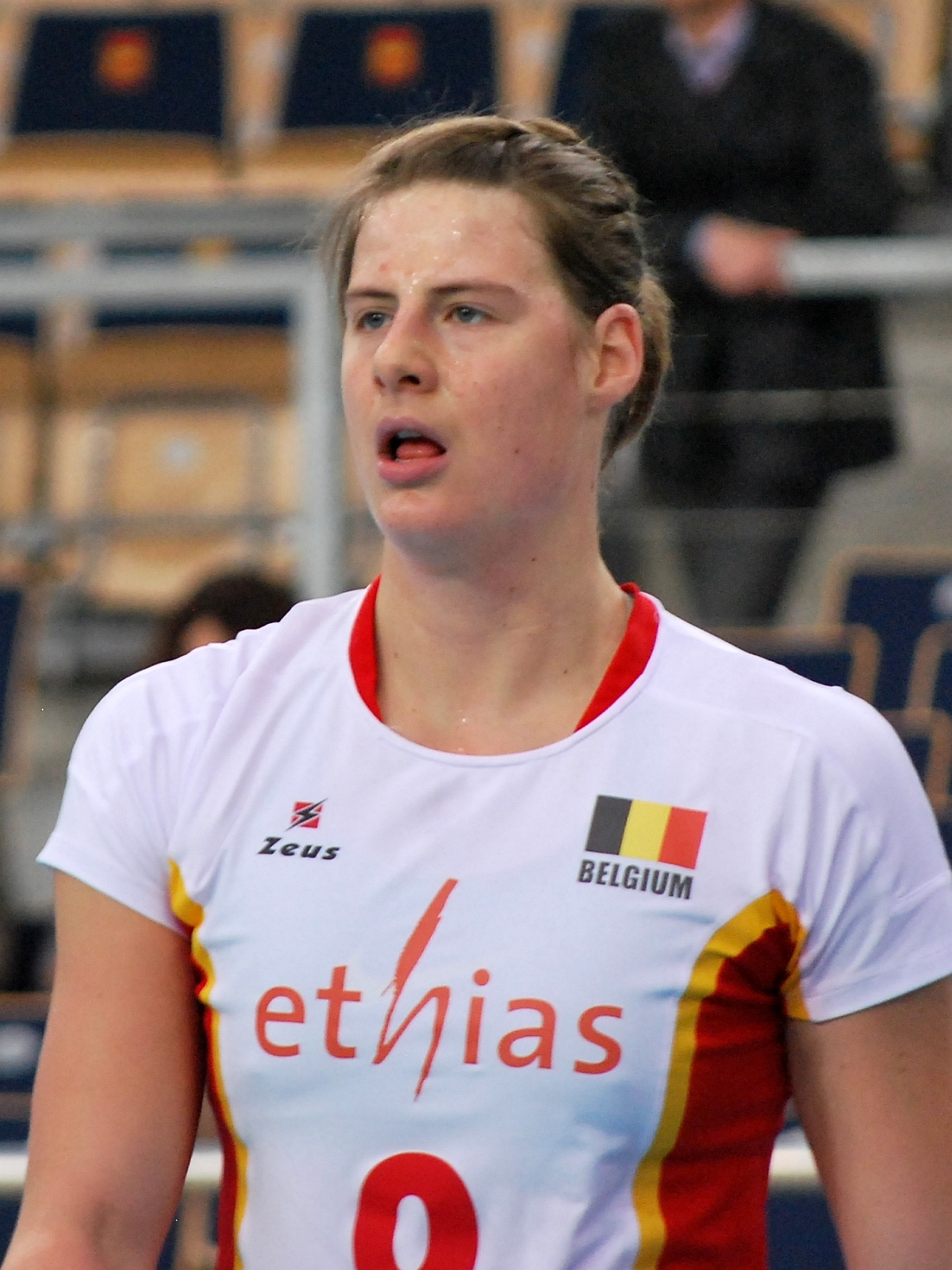

Personal information
- Nationality: Belgian
- Born: 10 February 1990 (age 36); Zutendaal, Belgium
- Height: 186 cm (6 ft 1 in)
- Weight: 82 kg (181 lb)
- Spike: 308 cm (121 in)
- Block: 282 cm (111 in)

Volleyball information
- Position: Middle-blocker
- Number: 9 (national team)

Career
Years	Teams
2008-2012	(Belgium) Asterix Kieldrecht
2012-2014	(France) Racing Club de Cannes
2014-2015	(Italy) Busto Arsizio
2015-2016	(Italy) Volley Pesaro
2016-2017	(Italy) US ProVictoria Pallavolo
2018-2019	(Japan) Kurobe AquaFairies
2019-2020	(Turkey) Türk Hava Yolları
2020-2021	(Italy) Perugia Volley
2021-2022	(Poland) Radomka Radom
2022	(Greece) Olympiacos
2023-present	(Italy) HR Macerata

National team
2015	Belgium
Honours
Women's volleyball
Representing Belgium
European Championships
Bronze medal – third place	2013 Germany	Team

Freya Aelbrecht (born 10 February 1990) is a Belgian volleyball player, playing as a middle-blocker. She is part of the Belgium women's national volleyball team.

She competed at the 2015 European Games and 2015 Women's European Volleyball Championship. On club level she plays for FV Busto Arsizio, and at the 2015 FIVB Volleyball World Grand Prix.
