= Teriha Sekisui House Arena =

Arena in Japan

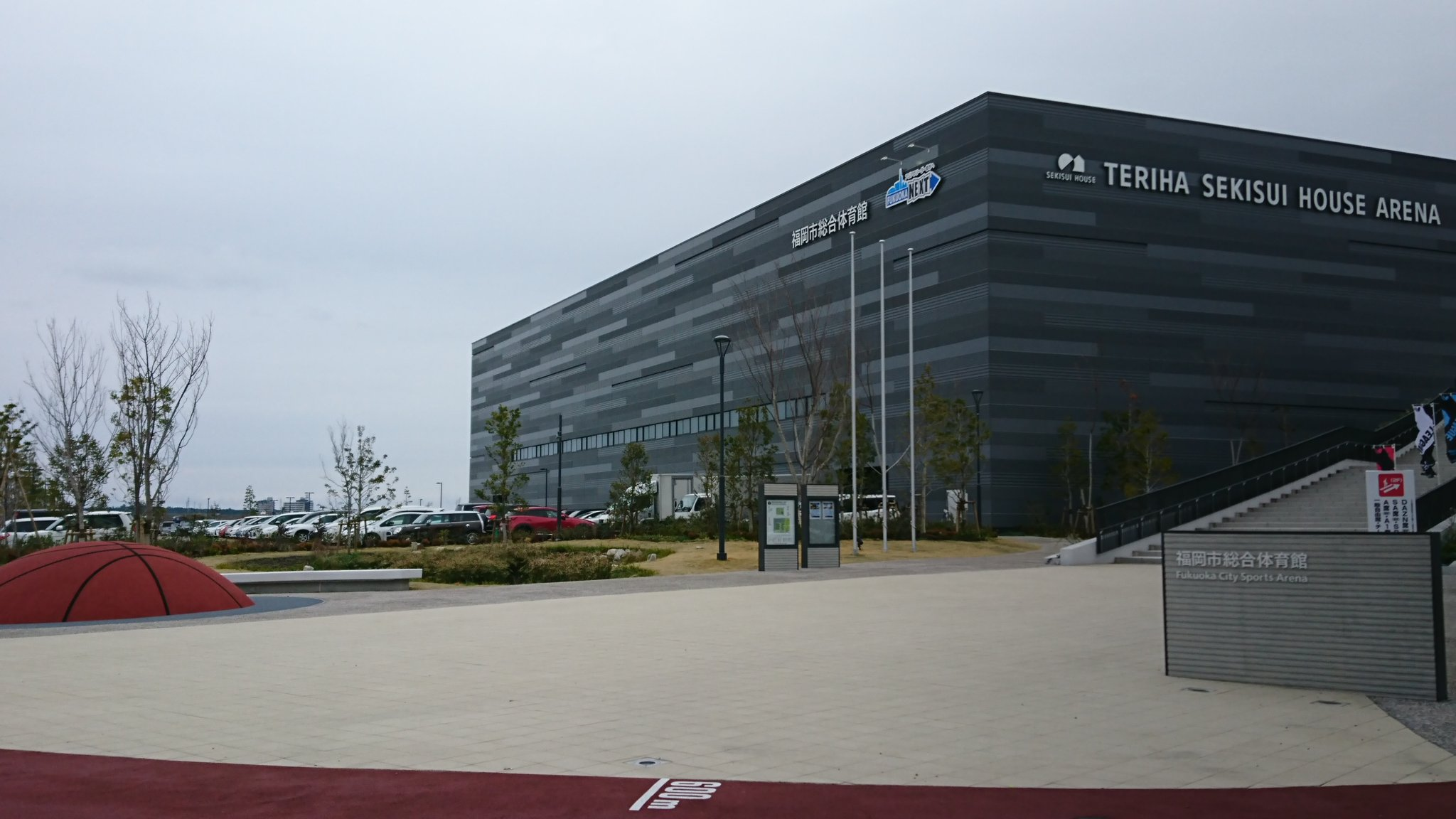

- Location within Fukuoka city Location within Fukuoka Prefecture Location within Japan
- Interactive map of Teriha Sekisui House Arena
- Full name: Fukuoka City General Gymnasium
- Location: Island City, Fukuoka, Japan
- Coordinates: 33°40′4.7″N 130°25′3.4″E
- Owner: Fukuoka city
- Capacity: 5,042
- Scoreboard: LED centerhung scoreboard
- Parking: 500 spaces

Construction
- Groundbreaking: February 1, 2017
- Opened: December 1, 2018
- Cost: JPY 9.5 billion
- Main contractor: Shimizu Corporation

Tenant
- Rizing Zephyr Fukuoka

Website
- http://www.fukuoka-city-arena.jp/

Teriha Sekisui House Arena is an arena in Island City, Fukuoka, Fukuoka. Groundbreaking and construction began on February 1, 2017, and opened on December 1, 2018.

== Facilities ==
- Main arena - 3,703 sqm
- Sub arena - 1,786 sqm
- Budojo
- Training room
- Kids room

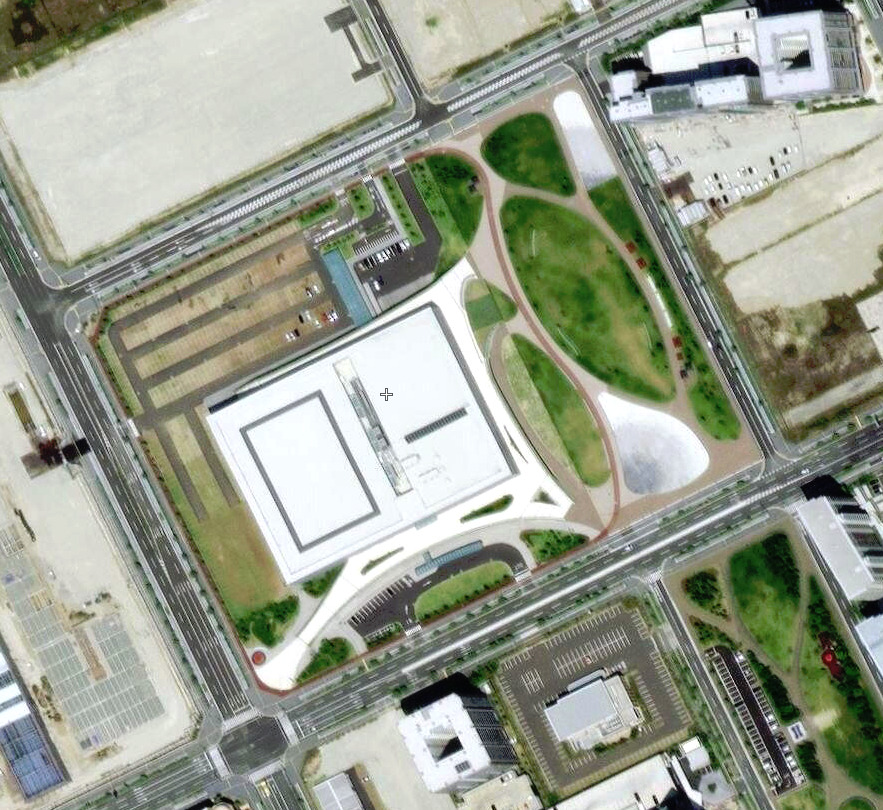
Satellite view

== Attendance records ==
The record for a basketball game is 5,618, set on February 2, 2019, when the Alvark Tokyo defeated the Rizing Zephyr Fukuoka 84-74.

== See also ==
- List of indoor arenas in Japan
