= Asuka Nomura =

Japanese volleyball player

Personal information
- Full name: Asuka Nomura
- Nickname: Asuka
- Born: July 23, 1994 (age 32); Ikeda, Ibi, Gifu, Japan
- Height: 181 cm (5 ft 11 in)
- Weight: 62 kg (137 lb)
- Spike: 306 cm (120 in)
- Block: 296 cm (117 in)

Volleyball information
- Position: Wing Spiker
- Current club: Toray Arrows
- Number: 13

Asuka Nomura (野村明日香 Nomura Asuka, born July 23, 1994) is a Japanese volleyball player who plays for Toray Arrows.

== Clubs ==
- (Japan) Kyushubunka high school
- (Japan) Toray Arrows (2013-)
