= Ai Kurogo =

Japanese volleyball player (born 1998)

Personal information
- Nickname: Roy
- Nationality: Japanese
- Born: 14 June 1998 (age 28) Utsunomiya, Tochigi, Japan
- Education: Shimokitazawa Seitoku High School
- Height: 1.80 m (5 ft 11 in)
- Weight: 69 kg (152 lb)
- Spike: 306 cm (120 in)
- Block: 295 cm (116 in)

Volleyball information
- Position: Opposite, Outside Hitter
- Current club: (Greece) AEK
- Number: 16

Career
- Years: Team
- 2017–2022: (Japan) Toray Arrows
- 2022–2026: (Japan) Saitama Ageo Medics
- 2026–: (Greece) AEK

National team
- Years: Team
- 2015–2016: U-18 national team
- 2017: U-20 national team
- 2017–2021, 2024: Senior national team
Honours
Women's volleyball
Representing Japan
FIVB Nations League
Silver medal – second place	2024 Bangkok	Team

Ai Kurogo (黒後 愛, Kurogo Ai; born 14 June 1998) is a Japanese volleyball player. She competed at the 2020 Summer Olympics, in Women's volleyball.

She was part of the Japan women's national volleyball team. She participated at the 2017 FIVB U20 Women's Volleyball World Championship, 2018 Asian Games, 2018 FIVB Volleyball Women's Nations League, 2018 FIVB Women's Volleyball World Championship, 2019 FIVB Volleyball Women's Nations League, 2021 FIVB Volleyball Women's Nations League and the 2024 FIVB Volleyball Women's Nations League where Japan won the silver medal for the first time in their Volleyball Nations League history. From the 2026/2027 season onwards, she will play for the Greek first division team AEK.

== Awards ==
=== Individual ===
- 2015-16 All Japan High School Championship - Best Outside Hitter
- 2015-16 All Japan High School Championship - Most Valuable Player
- 2016-17 All Japan High School Championship - Best Outside Hitter
- 2016-17 All Japan High School Championship - Most Valuable Player
- 2017–18 V.Premier League Women's - Best Face Award

=== High school ===
- 2015-16 All Japan High School Championship - Champion, with Shimokitazawa Seitoku High School
- 2016-17 All Japan High School Championship - Champion, with Shimokitazawa Seitoku High School
