= Fumika Moriya =

Japanese volleyball player (born 1992)

Personal information
- Nationality: Japanese
- Born: 7 April 1992 (age 34)
- Height: 180 cm (71 in)
- Weight: 75 kg (165 lb)
- Spike: 302 cm (119 in)
- Block: 286 cm (113 in)

Volleyball information
- Number: 22 (national team)

Career
| Years | Teams |
|---|---|
| 2013 | Hisamitsu Seiyaku Springs |

National team
| 2013 | Japan |

Fumika Moriya (森谷 史佳, Moriya Fumika; born 7 April 1992) is a Japanese female volleyball player. She was part of the Japan women's national volleyball team.

She participated in the 2013 FIVB Volleyball World Grand Prix. On club level she played for Hisamitsu Seiyaku Springs in 2013.
