= Yuki Ishii =

Japanese volleyball player (born 1991)

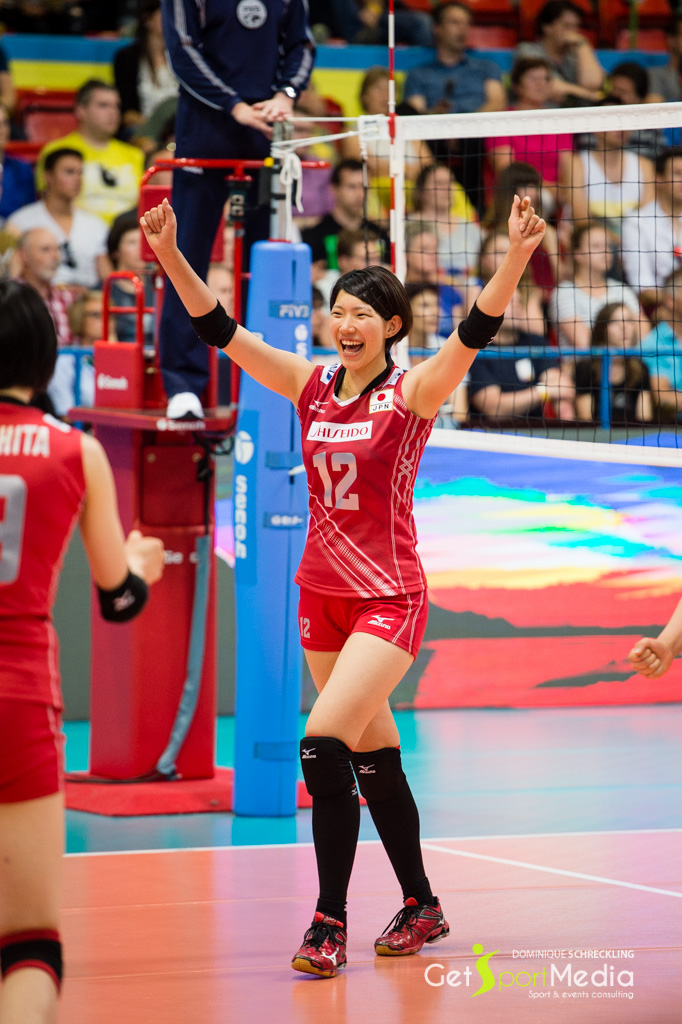

Personal information
- Full name: Yuki Ishii
- Nickname: Yuki
- Nationality: Japanese
- Born: May 8, 1991 (age 35) Kurashiki, Okayama, Japan
- Height: 1.80 m (5 ft 11 in)
- Weight: 68 kg (150 lb)
- Spike: 314 cm (124 in)
- Block: 307 cm (121 in)

Volleyball information
- Position: Wing Spiker (WS)
- Current club: Retired

National team
- Years: Team
- 2011–2021: Japan
Honours
Women's volleyball
Representing Japan
Montreux Volley Masters
Silver medal – second place	2019 Montreux	Team

Yuki Ishii (石井 優希, Ishii Yuki; born May 8, 1991) is a retired Japanese volleyball player who plays for Hisamitsu Springs. She also played for the All-Japan women's volleyball team. She competed at the 2020 Summer Olympics, in Women's volleyball.

== Career ==
Ishii played for the All-Japan team for the first time at the Montreux Volley Masters in June 2011.

== Clubs ==
- (Japan) Toyo Junior High
- (Japan) Shujitsu Highschool
- (Japan) Hisamitsu Springs (2010–2023)

== Awards ==
=== Individuals ===
- 2013 Japan-Korea V.League Top Match - MVP
- 2013-14 V.Premier League - Best Server
- 2014 Asian Club Championship - Best Outside Spiker
- 2015 Montreux Volley Masters - MVP, Best Outside Spiker
- 2017/18 V.League - MVP, Best Wing Spiker (best 6) and Best receiver

=== Clubs ===
- 2011-2012 V.Premier League - Runner-Up, with Hisamitsu Springs.
- 2012 Empress's Cup - Champion, with Hisamitsu Springs.
- 2012-2013 V.Premier League - Champion, with Hisamitsu Springs.
- 2013 - Japan-Korea V.League Top Match - Champion, with Hisamitsu Springs.
- 2013 - Kurowashiki All Japan Volleyball Tournament - Champion, with Hisamitsu Springs.
- 2013 - Empress's Cup - Champion, with Hisamitsu Springs.
- 2013-2014 V.Premier League - Champion, with Hisamitsu Springs.
- 2014 Asian Club Championship - Champion, with Hisamitsu Springs.
- 2014 - Empress's Cup - Champion, with Hisamitsu Springs.
- 2014-2015 V.Premier League - Runner-Up, with Hisamitsu Springs.

=== National team ===
- 2013 Asian Championship - Silver medal
- 2014 FIVB World Grand Prix - Silver medal
- 2015 Montreux Volley Masters - Silver medal
