= Sayaka Tsutsui =

Japanese volleyball player (born 1992)

Personal information
- Nickname: Saya
- Nationality: Japan
- Born: September 29, 1992 (age 34); Kurate, Fukuoka, Japan
- Height: 1.57 m (5 ft 2 in)
- Weight: 54 kg (119 lb)
- Spike: 260 cm (100 in)
- Block: 250 cm (98 in)

Volleyball information
- Position: Libero
- Current club: Le Cannet (fr)

National team
2014-	Japan

Sayaka Tsutsui (筒井 さやか, Tsutsui Sayaka; born 29 September 1992) is a female volleyball player from Japan. Tsutsui plays for Le Cannet (fr) and also plays for the Japan women's national volleyball team as libero.

== Career ==
Tsutsui was born in Kurate Town, Fukuoka Prefecture. She became a volleyball player at 6 years old and won a silver medal at All-Japan elementary school's tournament with Kurate junior VC.

While attending the Higashikyushu Ryukoku Highschool, Tsutsui won various highschool competitions with Miyu Nagaoka who is one year senior. Especially at 2009 Empress's Cup, Higashikyushu Ryukoku Highschool beat two teams of V.Premier League and Tsutsui won the bronze medal.

On 20 December 2010 Hisamitsu Springs announced her joining next season.

In 2013-14 V.Premier League Tsutsui played as regular libero and won the Best Libero Awards.

Once Tsutsui said "I want to play for the national team someday", which she did. Tsutsui competed at 2014 Montreux Volley Masters and won the silver medal at 2014 FIVB World Grand Prix.

On 3 August 2015 the French volleyball team Le Cannet (fr) announced her joining.

== Clubs ==
- (Japan) Kurate junior volleyball club
- (Japan) Hakata Girls' Junior High (2005-)
- (Japan) HIgashikyushu Ryukoku High (2008-)
- (Japan) Hisamitsu Springs (2011-2015)
- (France) Le Cannet(fr)

== Awards ==
=== Individuals ===
- 2013-14 V.Premier League - Best Libero award

=== Team ===
- 2011-2012 V.Premier League - Runner-Up, with Hisamitsu Springs.
- 2012 Empress's Cup - Champion, with Hisamitsu Springs.
- 2012-2013 V.Premier League - Champion, with Hisamitsu Springs.
- 2013 - Japan-Korea V.League Top Match - Champion, with Hisamitsu Springs.
- 2013 - Kurowashiki All Japan Volleyball Tournament - Champion, with Hisamitsu Springs.
- 2013 - Empress's Cup - Champion, with Hisamitsu Springs.
- 2013-2014 V.Premier League - Champion, with Hisamitsu Springs.
- 2014 Asian Club Championship - Champion, with Hisamitsu Springs.

=== National team ===
- 2014 FIVB World Grand Prix - Silver medal
