= Risa Shinnabe =

Japanese volleyball player (born 1990)

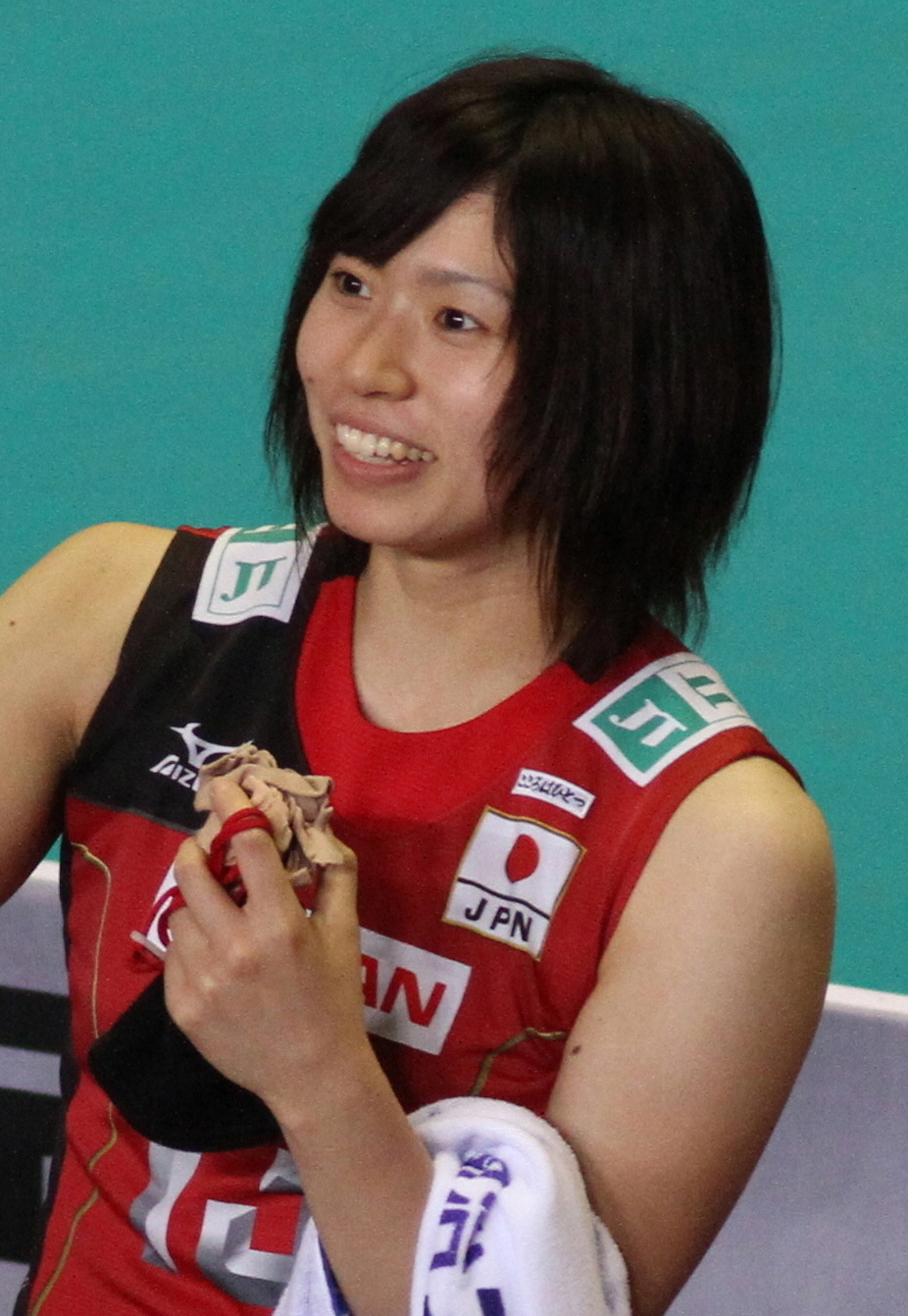

Personal information
- Full name: Risa Shinnabe
- Nickname: Risa
- Born: 11 July 1990 (age 36); Kokubu, Kagoshima, Japan
- Height: 173 cm (5 ft 8 in)
- Weight: 66 kg (146 lb)
- Spike: 293 cm (115 in)
- Block: 285 cm (112 in)

Volleyball information
- Position: Opposite spiker / Wing Spiker
- Current club: Hisamitsu Springs
- Number: 3

National team
Japan
Honours
Women's volleyball
Representing Japan
Olympic Games
Bronze medal – third place	2012 London	Team
World Grand Champions Cup
Bronze medal – third place	2013 Japan	Team
World Grand Prix
Silver medal – second place	2014 Tokyo	Team
Asian Championship
Gold medal – first place	2017 Biñan/Muntinlupa
Silver medal – second place	2013 Nakhon Ratchasima
Silver medal – second place	2011 Taipei
Montreux Volley Masters
Gold medal – first place	2011 Montreux	Team

Risa Shinnabe (新鍋 理沙 Shinnabe Risa, born July 11, 1990) is a retired professional Japanese volleyball player who played for Hisamitsu Springs. She also played for the All-Japan women's volleyball team. She won a bronze medal with the Japanese team at the 2012 Summer Olympics.

She announced her retirement from the sport at the age of 29.

== Clubs ==
- (Japan) Kanoya-chuo High School
- (Japan) NobeokaGakuen High School
- (Japan) Hisamitsu Springs (2009-2020)

== National team ==
- (Japan) National team (2011-2014)
- (Japan) National team (2017-2020)

== Awards ==
=== Individuals ===
- 2011 2010-11 V.Premier League - New Face Award
- 2012 2011-12 V.Premier League - Best Receive Award
- 2013 2012-13 V.Premier League - Best Receive Award
- 2013 Kurowashiki All Japan Volleyball Tournament Best6
- 2014 2013-14 V.Premier League - MVP, Best Serve Receiver, Best6
- 2014 Yeltsin Cup - Best Server
- 2017 Asian Women's Volleyball Championship - MVP

=== Clubs ===
- 2011-2012 V.Premier League - Runner-Up, with Hisamitsu Springs.
- 2012 Empress's Cup - Champion, with Hisamitsu Springs.
- 2012-2013 V.Premier League - Champion, with Hisamitsu Springs.
- 2013 - Japan-Korea V.League Top Match - Champion, with Hisamitsu Springs.
- 2013 - Kurowashiki All Japan Volleyball Tournament - Champion, with Hisamitsu Springs.
- 2013 - Empress's Cup - Champion, with Hisamitsu Springs.
- 2013-2014 V.Premier League - Champion, with Hisamitsu Springs.
- 2014 Asian Club Championship - Champion, with Hisamitsu Springs.

=== National team ===
- 2011: Montreux Volley Masters - Champion
- 2011: Silver Medal in the 16th Senior Asian Championship
- 2011: 4th place in the World Cup in Japan
- 2012: Bronze Medal in the Olympic Games of London
- 2013: Silver medal in the 17th Asian Women's Volleyball Championship
- 2017: Champion in the 19th Asian Women's Volleyball Championship

Awards
Preceded by (China) Zhu Ting	Most Valuable Player of Asian Championship; 2017	Succeeded by (Japan) Mayu Ishikawa
