= Yuko Maruyama =

Japanese volleyball player (born 1989)

Personal information
- Full name: Yuko Maruyama
- Nickname: Maru
- Born: September 17, 1989 (age 37) Matsumoto, Nagano, Nagano, Japan
- Height: 1.77 m (5 ft 10 in)
- Weight: 65 kg (143 lb)
- Spike: 298 cm (117 in)
- Block: 290 cm (114 in)

Volleyball information
- Position: Middle Blocker
- Current club: NEC Red Rockets
- Number: 24

National team
- Years: Team
- –: Japan

Yuko Maruyama (丸山 裕子, Maruyama Yūko; born September 17, 1989) is a Japanese volleyball player who plays for NEC Red Rockets.

== Profiles ==
- Her father was a volleyball player of NEC.

== Clubs ==
- MatsumotoShonan High School → NEC Red Rockets (2008-)

== National team ==
- Japan - 2008 (The 1st AVC Women's Cup)
