= 2021–22 V.League Division 1 Women's =

- League: V.League Division 1
- Sport: Volleyball
- Duration: Oct 15, 2021 – Apr 17, 2022
- Games: 198 (Regular round); 3 (Final stage)
- Teams: 12

2021–2022 Results
- Season champions: JT Marvelous
- Top scorer: Jana Kulan
- Finals champions: Hisamitsu Springs
- Runners-up: JT Marvelous
- Finals MVP: Arisa Inoue

Women's V.League Division 1 seasons
- 2020-21 2022-23

The Volleyball 2021–22 V.League Division 1 Women's is the 28th volleyball tournament year and includes the 4th top level women's volleyball tournament of the newly branded and reorganized V.League (Japan) scheduled for October 15, 2021 to April 17, 2022.

The V.League Division 1 Women's teams compete in four tournaments each year:

1. V.Summer League starts the season June 25 to July 4, 2021, and includes teams from V.League Division 2 Women's and two University selection teams. This is its 40th tournament year. Its main purpose is the strengthening and training of new and younger players.
2. The main V.League Division 1 Women's tournament starts October 15, 2021, and ends April 7, 2022 with a winter break December 6, 2021 to January 7, 2022.
3. The Empress' Cup Final Round is scheduled for December 10–19, 2021 during the winter break of the main V.League Division 1 Women's tournament. The Final Round is the culmination of a month's long qualification process where high school, university, business, and club teams participate in Prefectural and Block Round competitions for a chance to play in the Final Round. Sixteen teams will join the V.League Division 1 Women's teams in the Final Round. See also Japanese Wikipedia article: Reiwa 3rd Emperor's Cup / Empress's Cup All Japan Volleyball Championship (in Japanese) ja:令和3年度天皇杯・皇后杯全日本バレーボール選手権大会
4. The Kurowashiki All Japan Volleyball Tournament opens in May every year in Osaka and serves as the final competition of the season.

== Clubs ==
Locations of the 2021–22 V.League Division 1 Women's clubs

=== Personnel ===
2021–22 V.League Division 1 Women's Personnel
Club	Head coach	Captain	City, Prefecture	Colors	Main Sponsor
Denso Airybees	(Japan) Gen Kawakita	(Japan) Fumika Moriya	Nishio, Aichi		Denso
Himeji Victorina	(Japan) Kodai Nakaya	(Japan) Riho Sadakane	Himeji, Hyōgo		Himeji Victorina Co., Ltd.
Hisamitsu Springs	(Japan) Shingo Sakai	(Japan) Mana Toe	Tosu, Saga		Hisamitsu Pharmaceutical
Hitachi Rivale	(Japan) Asako Tajimi	(Japan) Kanako Saito	Hitachinaka, Ibaraki		Hitachi Automotive Systems
JT Marvelous	(Japan) Tomoko Yoshihara	(Japan) Mako Kobata	Osaka, Hyogo		Japan Tobacco Ltd.
Kurobe AquaFairies	(Japan) Takaya Maruyama	(Japan) Sayo Masuda	Kurobe, Toyama		Kurobe AquaFairies
NEC Red Rockets	(Japan) Takayuki Kaneko	(Japan) Misaki Yamauchi	Kawasaki, Kanagawa		NEC
Okayama Seagulls	(Japan) Akiyoshi Kawamoto	(Japan) Aimi Kawashima	Okayama		Okayama Seagulls Co., Ltd.
PFU BlueCats	(Japan) Masayasu Sakamoto	(Japan) Ayaka Horiguchi	Kanazawa, Ishikawa		PFU Limited
Saitama Ageo Medics	(Brazil) Antônio Marcos Lerbach	(Japan) Akane Yamagishi	Ageo, Saitama		Ageo Medical Group
Toray Arrows	(Japan) Akira Koshiya	(Japan) Misaki Shirai	Ōtsu, Shiga		Toray Industries
Toyota Auto Body Queenseis	(Japan) Haruya Indo	(Japan) Mioko Yabuta	Kariya, Aichi		Toyota Auto Body

=== Foreign players ===
The number of foreign players is restricted to one per club worldwide plus one per club from ASEAN nations.

V.League Division 1 Women's foreign players 2021-22
Team	Worldwide	ASEAN
Denso Airybees	(Venezuela) Roslandy Acosta (CSV)	(Thailand) Jarasporn Bundasak (AVC)
Himeji Victorina	(Netherlands) Celeste Plak (CEV)	—N/a
Hisamitsu Springs	(United States) Foluke Akinradewo (NORCECA)	—N/a
Hitachi Rivale	(United States) Hannah Tapp (NORCECA)	—N/a
JT Marvelous	(United States) Andrea Drews (NORCECA)	(Thailand) Thatdao Nuekjang (AVC)
Kurobe AquaFairies	(United States) Merete Lutz (NORCECA)	(Thailand) Pimpichaya Kokram (AVC)
NEC Red Rockets	(United States) Sarah Wilhite Parsons (NORCECA)	—N/a
Okayama Seagulls	(China) Xintian Fu	—N/a
PFU BlueCats	(Cuba) Melissa Valdes	(Vietnam) Trần Thị Thanh Thúy (AVC)
Saitama Ageo Medics	(Brazil) Lorenne Teixeira (CSV)	(Philippines) Jaja Santiago (AVC)
Toray Arrows	(Azerbaijan) Jana Kulan (CEV)	—N/a
Toyota Auto Body Queenseis	(United States) Kelsey Robinson (NORCECA)	(Thailand) Hattaya Bamrungsuk (AVC)

=== Transfer players ===
2021–22 V.League Division 1 Women's inbound transfers
Player	Coming from	Coming to
(Japan) Nanami Asano	(Japan) Kinrankai High School (ja)	(Japan) Denso Airybees
(Japan) Yoshino Sato	(Japan) Yonezawa Central High School (ja)	(Japan) Denso Airybees
(Japan) Airi Takahashi	(Japan) Kurashiki Ablaze	(Japan) Denso Airybees
(Venezuela) Roslandy Acosta	(Japan) PFU BlueCats	(Japan) Denso Airybees
(Thailand) Jarasporn Bundasak	(Thailand) Diamond Food	(Japan) Denso Airybees
(Japan) Kaya Watanabe	(Japan) Nihon University	(Japan) Himeji Victorina
(Japan) Rimi Kaneda	(Japan) Tokai Mermaids	(Japan) Himeji Victorina
(Netherlands) Celeste Plak	(Turkey) Aydın Büyükşehir Belediyespor	(Japan) Himeji Victorina
(Japan) Manami Mandai	(Japan) University of Tsukuba	(Japan) Hisamitsu Springs
(Japan) Riho Ōtake	(Japan) Denso Airybees	(Japan) Hisamitsu Springs
(Japan) Aya Watanabe	(Japan) Toyota Auto Body Queenseis	(Japan) Hitachi Rivale
(Japan) Rino Murooka	(Japan) Higashi Kyushu Ryukoku High School (ja)	(Japan) Hitachi Rivale
(Japan) Marina Takahashi	(Japan) University of Tsukuba	(Japan) JT Marvelous
(Japan) Mana Nishizaki	(Japan) Kinrankai High School (ja)	(Japan) JT Marvelous
(Japan) Manami Koyama	(Japan) Kyoei Gakuen High School (ja)	(Japan) JT Marvelous
(Japan) Anna Kikuchi	(Japan) Tokai Mermaids	(Japan) Kurobe AquaFairies
(Japan) Ami Yamashiro	(Japan) University of Tsukuba	(Japan) Kurobe AquaFairies
(Japan) Miku Shimada	(Japan) Juntendo University	(Japan) Kurobe AquaFairies
(United States) Merete Lutz	(South Korea) GS Caltex Seoul KIXX	(Japan) Kurobe AquaFairies
(Thailand) Pimpichaya Kokram	(Thailand) 3BB Nakornnont	(Japan) Kurobe AquaFairies
(Japan) Yuka Kanasugi	(Japan) Himeji Victorina	(Japan) Kurobe AquaFairies
(Japan) Chiyo Suzuki	(Japan) Beach volleyball	(Japan) Kurobe AquaFairies
(Japan) Riko Fujii	(Japan) Shoin University	(Japan) NEC Red Rockets
(Japan) Hina Kawakami	(Japan) University of Tsukuba	(Japan) NEC Red Rockets
(United States) Sarah Wilhite Parsons	(Turkey) Nilüfer Belediyespor	(Japan) NEC Red Rockets
(Japan) Kotoe Inoue	(Japan) Denso Airybees	(Japan) NEC Red Rockets
(China) Xintian Fu	(Japan) Kyoei Gakuen High School (ja)	(Japan) Okayama Seagulls
(Japan) Maika Matsumoto	(Japan) Shimada Commercial High School (ja)	(Japan) Okayama Seagulls
(Japan) Yuzu Nakamoto	(Japan) Osaka International Takii High School (ja)	(Japan) Okayama Seagulls
(Japan) Megumi Sato	(Japan) Hiroshima Oilers	(Japan) Okayama Seagulls
(Japan) Mari Morita	(Japan) Miyakonojo Commercial High School (ja)	(Japan) PFU BlueCats
(Cuba) Melissa Valdes	(Japan) Furukawa Gakuen High School (ja)	(Japan) PFU BlueCats
(Japan) Kanoha Kagamihara	(Japan) University of Tsukuba	(Japan) PFU BlueCats
(Japan) Airi Tahara	(Japan) Denso Airybees	(Japan) PFU BlueCats
(Japan) Mikoto Shima	(Japan) Juntendo University	(Japan) PFU BlueCats
(Japan) Sanae Watanabe	(Japan) Okayama Seagulls	(Japan) PFU BlueCats
(Japan) Yurie Nabeya	(Japan) Denso Airybees	(Japan) PFU BlueCats
(Vietnam) Trần Thị Thanh Thúy	(Vietnam) VTV Bình Điền Long An	(Japan) PFU BlueCats
(Japan) Saki Kamata	(Japan) NSSU	(Japan) Saitama Ageo Medics
(Japan) Aki Meguro	(Japan) Aoyama Gakuin University	(Japan) Saitama Ageo Medics
(Japan) Hibiki Suzuki	(Japan) Gunma Bank Green Wings (ja)	(Japan) Saitama Ageo Medics
(Japan) Akiho Kurisu	(Japan) Osaka Superiors (ja)	(Japan) Saitama Ageo Medics
(Philippines) Jaja Santiago	(Philippines) Chery Tiggo Crossovers	(Japan) Saitama Ageo Medics
(Brazil) Lorenne Teixeira	(Brazil) Sesc/Flamengo	(Japan) Saitama Ageo Medics
(Japan) Yoshino Nishikawa	(Japan) Kinrankai High School (ja)	(Japan) Toray Arrows
(Japan) Madoka Kashimura	(Japan) Mito Girls High School (ja)	(Japan) Toray Arrows
(Japan) Yukiho Hara	(Japan) Kansai University	(Japan) Toyota Auto Body Queenseis
(Japan) Haruka Kaji	(Japan) Sundai Gakuen High School (ja)	(Japan) Toyota Auto Body Queenseis
(Japan) Aimi Okawa	(Japan) Hachiojijissen (ja)	(Japan) Toyota Auto Body Queenseis
(Japan) Sakura Kurosu	(Japan) Hachiojijissen (ja)	(Japan) Toyota Auto Body Queenseis
(Japan) Hina Koide	(Japan) Shimokitazawa Seitoku (ja)	(Japan) Toyota Auto Body Queenseis
(Japan) Ayana Funane	(Japan) Shimokitazawa Seitoku (ja)	(Japan) Toyota Auto Body Queenseis
(Japan) Natsuki Suda	(Japan) Shujitsu High School (ja)	(Japan) Toyota Auto Body Queenseis
(United States) Kelsey Robinson	(Turkey) Fenerbahçe Opet	(Japan) Toyota Auto Body Queenseis
(Thailand) Hattaya Bamrungsuk	(Thailand) Diamond Food VC	(Japan) Toyota Auto Body Queenseis

== Venues ==
Regular Round 2021–2022

Adastria Arena, Mito
Ageo City Gymnasium (ja)
Baycom Gymnasium, Amagasaki (ja)
Brex Arena, Utsunomiya
CNA Arena, Akita
Fukuoka Citizens Gymnasium
Deai Dome, Gifu
Green Arena, Kobe
Higashiyama Gymnasium, Ichinoseki
Hiroshima Green Arena
Hitachinaka Sports Facility (ja)
Ikenokawa Sakura Arena, Hitachi

Kanazawa City Gymnasium
Kasaoka Gymnasium, Okayama (ja)
Kawagoe Sports Park, Saitama
Kitagas Arena, Sapporo (ja)
Komatsu City Gymnasium, Ishikawa
Konohana Arena, Shizuoka
Horaiya Koriyama Gymnasium
Kose Sports Park Gymnasium, Kofu (ja)
Kurobe General Sports Center (ja)
Kurume Arena, Fukuoka
Maruzen Intec Arena, Osaka
Muko Citizens Gymnasium, Kyoto

Nishio City Gymnasium (ja)
Okazaki Park Gymnasium, Aichi
Ota Ward Gymnasium, Tokyo
Saga Sunrise Park Gymnasium
Saiden Chemical Arena, Saitama (ja)
Saitama Prefectural Budokan, Ageo (ja)
Sanyo Fureai Park Gymnasium, Akaiwa
Shimadzu Arena, Kyoto (ja)
Shiwa Town Gymnasium, Iwate
Sky Hall Toyota
Sumiyoshi Sports Center, Osaka
Sun Arena Sendai (ja)

Sun Arena Wajima, Ishikawa
Todoroki Arena, Kawasaki
Toyama City Gymnasium
Toyama Seibu Sports Center, Tonami
Trim Park Kanazu, Awara (ja)
Ukaruchan Arena, Otsu
Wing Arena Kariya
Wink Gymnasium, Himeji
YMIT Arena, Kusatsu (ja
Yokkaichi City Gymnasium
Zip Arena, Okayama

Final Stage 2021–2022

Konohana Arena, Shizuoka

== Schedule ==
Regular Round begins October 15, 2021 (Saturday) and ends March 27, 2022 (Sunday). Matches are played every Saturday and Sunday along with a couple Friday Night matches.

1. Each team will play every other team three times for a total of thirty-three matches
2. It is not a strict round robin
3. A theme this season is for each team to host at least one opponent two nights in a row at their home arena
4. Teams are ranked in the Regular Round by:
  - Wins ->Points ->Set Percentage ->Scoring Rate
5. The top three teams from the Regular Round will advance to the Final Stage
6. Ranking of 4th to 12th place will be the ranking of the Regular Round and will be the final ranking. The 11th and 12th placed teams will compete in the V.Challenge Match.

Final Stage begins April 9, 2022 and ends April 17, 2022.

1. Final 3:
  - The 2nd and 3rd ranked teams from the Regular Round will play a one match playoff
  - The 2nd ranked team is given a one win advantage
  - There are no tie breakers
  - If the number of wins is equal a 25 point Golden Set will be played to determine the winner
2. Final
  - The winner of the Final 3 tournament will play the 1st ranked team from the Regular Round in a two match Final
  - No advantage points are given
  - No tie breakers
  - If the number of wins is equal a 25 point Golden Set will be played to determine the winner

V.Challenge Match (V1-V2 Promotion-Relegation Matches): TBD

== Season standing procedure ==
The team with the most wins will be ranked highest

Points awarded for a match as follows:

- 3 points: "3-0" or "3-1" victory
- 2 points: "3-2" victory
- 1 point: "2-3" loss
- 0 points: Lost in "0-3" or "1-3"

If a team abstains for some reason, it will be considered to have lost the game 0-25, 0-25, 0-25

Tie Breakers are as follows:

- If two or more teams have the same number of wins, the team with the most points will be ranked higher
- If the number of points is also the same, the team with the highest set rate will be ranked higher
- If the set rate is also the same, the team with the highest points rate will be ranked higher

== Regular round ==
=== Final standing ===
Qualified for the Final
Qualified for the Final 3 playoff
Will play the V.Challenge Match

2021–22 V.League Division 1 Women's Regular Round Final Standing
Rank	Team	Wins	Losses	Points	Sets Won	Sets Lost	Set Rate	Pts Won	Pts Lost	Pts Rate
1	JT Marvelous	27	6	80	86	30	2.87	2774	2320	1.20
2	Toray Arrows	26	7	79	87	34	2.56	2814	2485	1.13
3	Hisamitsu Springs	23	10	72	82	44	1.86	2955	2711	1.09
4	NEC Red Rockets	23	10	70	78	43	1.81	2815	2508	1.12
5	Saitama Ageo Medics	20	13	60	72	55	1.31	2936	2748	1.07
6	Denso Airybees	20	13	56	67	57	1.18	2798	2744	1.02
7	Hitachi Rivale	14	19	41	54	73	0.74	2612	2917	0.90
8	PFU BlueCats	12	21	38	50	72	0.69	2583	2757	0.94
9	Okayama Seagulls	12	21	36	49	71	0.69	2650	2759	0.96
10	Toyota Auto Body Queenseis	10	23	29	43	78	0.55	2601	2826	0.92
11	Himeji Victorina	8	25	25	49	86	0.57	2854	3102	0.92
12	Kurobe AquaFairies	3	30	8	20	94	0.21	2220	2735	0.81

=== Individual awards ===
2021–22 V.League Division 1 Women's Regular Round Individual Awards
Award	Player	Team	Achievement	# of Times
Top Scorer	Jana Kulan	Toray Arrows	Total Points = 789	3rd
Spike Award	Foluke Akinradewo	Hisamitsu Springs	Kill Rate = 56.5%	4th
Block Award	Jaja Santiago	Saitama Ageo Medics	Blocks/set = 0.81	1st
Serve Award	Mioko Yabuta	Toyota Auto Body Queenseis	Serve Effect Rate = 13.4%	1st
Receive Award	Mako Kobata	JT Marvelous	Reception Rate = 69.5%	2nd

=== Match results ===
Round 1 October 15–17, 2021

15 October 2021; 18:15	Toray Arrows	3−1	Himeji Victorina	Ukaruchan Arena, Otsu; Attendance: 767; Referees: Yuka Kitamura
15 October 2021; 18:15	(22−25, 25−22, 26−24, 25−21); Report A Report B			Ukaruchan Arena, Otsu; Attendance: 767; Referees: Yuka Kitamura

16 October 2021; 12:00	Toyota Auto Body Queenseis	1−3	JT Marvelous	Wing Arena Kariya; Attendance: 452; Referees: Nana Yoshioka
16 October 2021; 12:00	(22−25, 25−21, 18−25, 20−25); Report A Report B			Wing Arena Kariya; Attendance: 452; Referees: Nana Yoshioka

16 October 2021; 13:00	NEC Red Rockets	3−0	Kurobe AquaFairies	Todoroki Arena, Kawasaki; Attendance: 1218; Referees: Mikako Masuoka
16 October 2021; 13:00	(25−15, 25−19, 25−12); Report A Report B			Todoroki Arena, Kawasaki; Attendance: 1218; Referees: Mikako Masuoka

16 October 2021; 13:00	Denso Airybees	3−1	PFU BlueCats	Nishio City Gymnasium (ja); Attendance: 660; Referees: Toshie Akai
16 October 2021; 13:00	(23−25, 25−16, 25−21, 25−20); Report A Report B			Nishio City Gymnasium (ja); Attendance: 660; Referees: Toshie Akai

16 October 2021; 13:00	Hisamitsu Springs	2−3	Hitachi Rivale	Saga Sunrise Park; Attendance: 812; Referees: Junichi Hayashi
16 October 2021; 13:00	(23−25, 23−25, 25−16, 25−23, 16−18); Report A Report B			Saga Sunrise Park; Attendance: 812; Referees: Junichi Hayashi

16 October 2021; 14:00	Okayama Seagulls	2−3	Saitama Ageo Medics	Kasaoka Gymnasium, Okayama (ja); Attendance: 560; Referees: Hirokazu Tomita
16 October 2021; 14:00	(30−28, 24−26, 25−23, 13−25, 11−15); Report A Report B			Kasaoka Gymnasium, Okayama (ja); Attendance: 560; Referees: Hirokazu Tomita

16 October 2021; 17:30	Toray Arrows	3−0	Himeji Victorina	Ukaruchan Arena, Otsu; Attendance: 496; Referees: Yutaka Moriguchi
16 October 2021; 17:30	(25−20, 25−17, 25−18); Report A Report B			Ukaruchan Arena, Otsu; Attendance: 496; Referees: Yutaka Moriguchi

17 October 2021; 12:00	Toyota Auto Body Queenseis	0–3	JT Marvelous	Wing Arena Kariya; Attendance: 452; Referees: Nana Yoshioka
17 October 2021; 12:00	(16-25, 19-25, 13-25); Report A Report B			Wing Arena Kariya; Attendance: 452; Referees: Nana Yoshioka

17 October 2021; 13:00	NEC Red Rockets	3–1	Kurobe AquaFairies	Todoroki Arena, Kawasaki; Attendance: 1201; Referees: Nahoko Watanabe
17 October 2021; 13:00	(25-23, 25-20, 14-25, 25-17); Report A Report B			Todoroki Arena, Kawasaki; Attendance: 1201; Referees: Nahoko Watanabe

17 October 2021; 13:00	Denso Airybees	3–0	PFU BlueCats	Nishio City Gymnasium (ja); Attendance: 630; Referees: Tomohito Castle
17 October 2021; 13:00	(25-20, 25-23, 25-22); Report A Report B			Nishio City Gymnasium (ja); Attendance: 630; Referees: Tomohito Castle

17 October 2021; 12:00	Hisamitsu Springs	3–1	Hitachi Rivale	Saga Sunrise Park; Attendance: 819; Referees: Seiji Kiuchi
17 October 2021; 12:00	(25-20, 19-25, 25-22, 25-16); Report A Report B			Saga Sunrise Park; Attendance: 819; Referees: Seiji Kiuchi

17 October 2021; 14:00	Okayama Seagulls	0–3	Saitama Ageo Medics	Kasaoka Gymnasium, Okayama (ja); Attendance: 526; Referees: Yasuo Chiyonobu
17 October 2021; 14:00	(16-25, 15-25, 22-25); Report A Report B			Kasaoka Gymnasium, Okayama (ja); Attendance: 526; Referees: Yasuo Chiyonobu

Round 2 October 23–24, 2021

23 October 2021; 12:00	Kurobe AquaFairies	0–3	Okayama Seagulls	Kurobe General Sports Center (ja); Attendance: 1,100; Referees: Yutaka Moriguchi
23 October 2021; 12:00	(18-25, 15-25, 25-27); Report A Report B			Kurobe General Sports Center (ja); Attendance: 1,100; Referees: Yutaka Moriguchi

23 October 2021; 12:00	PFU BlueCats	3–0	Toyota Auto Body Queenseis	Sun Arena Wajima, Ishikawa; Attendance: 375; Referees: Hiroyuki Hara
23 October 2021; 12:00	(25-13, 25-21, 25-16); Report A Report B			Sun Arena Wajima, Ishikawa; Attendance: 375; Referees: Hiroyuki Hara

23 October 2021; 13:00	Saitama Ageo Medics	1–3	JT Marvelous	Higashiyama Gymnasium, Ichinoseki; Attendance: 500; Referees: Yuka Tsushima
23 October 2021; 13:00	(21-25, 26-28, 25-17, 23-25); Report A Report B			Higashiyama Gymnasium, Ichinoseki; Attendance: 500; Referees: Yuka Tsushima

23 October 2021; 13:00	Hitachi Rivale	2–3	Himeji Victorina	Ikenokawa Sakura Arena, Hitachi; Attendance: 559; Referees: Yui Asai
23 October 2021; 13:00	(25-17, 25-20, 23-25, 23-25, 11-15); Report A Report B			Ikenokawa Sakura Arena, Hitachi; Attendance: 559; Referees: Yui Asai

23 October 2021; 13:00	Hisamitsu Springs	3–1	Denso Airybees	Green Arena, Kobe; Attendance: 800; Referees: Ken Nakayama
23 October 2021; 13:00	(19-25, 25-22, 28-26, 25-21); Report A Report B			Green Arena, Kobe; Attendance: 800; Referees: Ken Nakayama

23 October 2021; 14:30	Toray Arrows	2–3	NEC Red Rockets	Kurobe General Sports Center (ja); Attendance: 1,200; Referees: Yuka Kitamura
23 October 2021; 14:30	(25-21, 25-22, 18-25, 16-25, 11-15); Report A Report B			Kurobe General Sports Center (ja); Attendance: 1,200; Referees: Yuka Kitamura

24 October 2021; 12:00	Kurobe AquaFairies	0–3	Okayama Seagulls	Kurobe General Sports Center (ja); Attendance: 1,100; Referees: Satomi Naito
24 October 2021; 12:00	(21-25, 13-25, 20-25); Report A Report B			Kurobe General Sports Center (ja); Attendance: 1,100; Referees: Satomi Naito

24 October 2021; 12:00	Saitama Ageo Medics	0–3	JT Marvelous	Higashiyama Gymnasium, Ichinoseki; Attendance: 600; Referees: Toshie Akai
24 October 2021; 12:00	(23-25, 18-25, 20-25); Report A Report B			Higashiyama Gymnasium, Ichinoseki; Attendance: 600; Referees: Toshie Akai

24 October 2021; 13:00	Hitachi Rivale	3–2	Himeji Victorina	Ikenokawa Sakura Arena, Hitachi; Attendance: 420; Referees: Mikako Masuoka
24 October 2021; 13:00	(25-19, 22-25, 23-25, 27-25, 16-14); Report A Report B			Ikenokawa Sakura Arena, Hitachi; Attendance: 420; Referees: Mikako Masuoka

24 October 2021; 13:00	Hisamitsu Springs	3–1	Denso Airybees	Green Arena, Kobe; Attendance: 750; Referees: Junichi Hayashi
24 October 2021; 13:00	(25-10, 25-21, 26-28, 25-22); Report A Report B			Green Arena, Kobe; Attendance: 750; Referees: Junichi Hayashi

24 October 2021; 14:00	PFU BlueCats	3–1	Toyota Auto Body Queenseis	Sun Arena Wajima, Ishikawa; Attendance: 369; Referees: Nana Yoshioka
24 October 2021; 14:00	(17-25, 25-18, 25-16, 25-18); Report A Report B			Sun Arena Wajima, Ishikawa; Attendance: 369; Referees: Nana Yoshioka

24 October 2021; 14:30	Toray Arrows	3–1	NEC Red Rockets	Kurobe General Sports Center (ja); Attendance: 1,170; Referees: Yutaka Moriguchi
24 October 2021; 14:30	(25-22, 25-23, 20-25, 25-22); Report A Report B			Kurobe General Sports Center (ja); Attendance: 1,170; Referees: Yutaka Moriguchi

Round 3 October 30–31, 2021

30 October 2021; 12:00	JT Marvelous	3–1	Kurobe AquaFairies	Maruzen Intec Arena, Osaka; Attendance: 734; Referees: Toshie Akai
30 October 2021; 12:00	(24-26, 25-22, 25-15, 25-19); Report A Report B			Maruzen Intec Arena, Osaka; Attendance: 734; Referees: Toshie Akai

30 October 2021; 13:00	Toyota Auto Body Queenseis	0–3	Hisamitsu Springs	Wing Arena Kariya; Attendance: 554; Referees: Tomohito Castle
30 October 2021; 13:00	(23-25, 20-25, 22-25); Report A Report B			Wing Arena Kariya; Attendance: 554; Referees: Tomohito Castle

30 October 2021; 13:00	Hitachi Rivale	0–3	Denso Airybees	CNA Arena, Akita; Attendance: 945; Referees: Atsushi Hattori
30 October 2021; 13:00	(20-25, 22-25, 17-25); Report A Report B			CNA Arena, Akita; Attendance: 945; Referees: Atsushi Hattori

30 October 2021; 13:00	Himeji Victorina	1–3	NEC Red Rockets	Wink Gymnasium, Himeji; Attendance: 962; Referees: Hirokazu Tomita
30 October 2021; 13:00	(19-25, 19-25, 25-23, 25-27); Report A Report B			Wink Gymnasium, Himeji; Attendance: 962; Referees: Hirokazu Tomita

30 October 2021; 14:00	PFU BlueCats	3–0	Saitama Ageo Medics	Komatsu City Gymnasium, Ishikawa; Attendance: 521; Referees: Satomi Naito
30 October 2021; 14:00	(25-23, 25-23, 25-20); Report A Report B			Komatsu City Gymnasium, Ishikawa; Attendance: 521; Referees: Satomi Naito

30 October 2021; 14:30	Okayama Seagulls	0–3	Toray Arrows	Zip Arena, Okayama; Attendance: 836; Referees: Yuka Kitamura
30 October 2021; 14:30	(26-28 17-25 20-25); Report A Report B			Zip Arena, Okayama; Attendance: 836; Referees: Yuka Kitamura

31 October 2021; 12:00	JT Marvelous	3–0	Kurobe AquaFairies	Maruzen Intec Arena, Osaka; Attendance: 774; Referees: Misato Sato
31 October 2021; 12:00	(25-15, 25-20, 25-17); Report A Report B			Maruzen Intec Arena, Osaka; Attendance: 774; Referees: Misato Sato

31 October 2021; 12:00	Hitachi Rivale	1–3	Denso Airybees	CNA Arena, Akita; Attendance: 1,055; Referees: Yuka Tsushima
31 October 2021; 12:00	(17-25, 25-21, 27-29, 21-25); Report A Report B			CNA Arena, Akita; Attendance: 1,055; Referees: Yuka Tsushima

31 October 2021; 13:00	Toyota Auto Body Queenseis	1–3	Hisamitsu Springs	Wing Arena Kariya; Attendance: 585; Referees: Kazuyoshi Yamamoto
31 October 2021; 13:00	(19-25, 20-25, 28-26, 20-2); Report A Report B			Wing Arena Kariya; Attendance: 585; Referees: Kazuyoshi Yamamoto

31 October 2021; 13:00	Himeji Victorina	1–3	NEC Red Rockets	Wink Gymnasium, Himeji; Attendance: 1,148; Referees: Mikako Masuoka
31 October 2021; 13:00	(25-23, 17-25, 19-25, 21-25); Report A Report B			Wink Gymnasium, Himeji; Attendance: 1,148; Referees: Mikako Masuoka

31 October 2021; 14:00	PFU BlueCats	0–3	Saitama Ageo Medics	Komatsu City Gymnasium, Ishikawa; Attendance: 641; Referees: Yutaka Moriguchi
31 October 2021; 14:00	(25-27, 17-25, 18-25); Report A Report B			Komatsu City Gymnasium, Ishikawa; Attendance: 641; Referees: Yutaka Moriguchi

31 October 2021; 14:00	Okayama Seagulls	1–3	Toray Arrows	Zip Arena, Okayama; Attendance: 835; Referees: Nana Yoshioka
31 October 2021; 14:00	(16-25, 25-22, 20-25, 21-25); Report A Report B			Zip Arena, Okayama; Attendance: 835; Referees: Nana Yoshioka

Round 4 November 6–7, 2021

6 November 2021; TBD	NEC Red Rockets	3–0	Hitachi Rivale	Horaiya Koriyama Gymnasium; Attendance: 1,053; Referees: Yuka Tsushima
6 November 2021; TBD	(25-10, 25-19, 25-21); Report A Report B			Horaiya Koriyama Gymnasium; Attendance: 1,053; Referees: Yuka Tsushima

6 November 2021; 12:00	Denso Airybees	3–0	Toyota Auto Body Queenseis	Horaiya Koriyama Gymnasium; Attendance: 1,045; Referees: Hiroaki Takahashi
6 November 2021; 12:00	(25-20, 25-21, 25-18); Report A Report B			Horaiya Koriyama Gymnasium; Attendance: 1,045; Referees: Hiroaki Takahashi

6 November 2021; 13:00	Kurobe AquaFairies	0–3	PFU BlueCats	Toyama Seibu Sports Center, Tonami; Attendance: 745; Referees: Hirokazu Tomita
6 November 2021; 13:00	(18-25, 24-26, 13-25); Report A Report B			Toyama Seibu Sports Center, Tonami; Attendance: 745; Referees: Hirokazu Tomita

6 November 2021; 13:00	Himeji Victorina	3–2	Okayama Seagulls	Wink Gymnasium, Himeji; Attendance: 983; Referees: Shin Yamamoto
6 November 2021; 13:00	(25-18, 20-25, 25-17, 29-31, 15-13); Report A Report B			Wink Gymnasium, Himeji; Attendance: 983; Referees: Shin Yamamoto

6 November 2021; 14:00	Saitama Ageo Medics	0–3	Hisamitsu Springs	Shimadzu Arena, Kyoto (ja); Attendance: 420; Referees: Yuka Kitamura
6 November 2021; 14:00	(22-25, 23-25, 21-25); Report A Report B			Shimadzu Arena, Kyoto (ja); Attendance: 420; Referees: Yuka Kitamura

6 November 2021; 15:00	Toray Arrows	0–3	JT Marvelous	YMIT Arena, Kusatsu (ja Attendance: 1,158; Referees: Yutaka Moriguchi
6 November 2021; 15:00	(19-25, 16-25, 21-25); Report A Report B			YMIT Arena, Kusatsu (ja Attendance: 1,158; Referees: Yutaka Moriguchi

7 November 2021; 14:55	NEC Red Rockets	3–2	Hitachi Rivale	Horaiya Koriyama Gymnasium; Attendance: 1,115; Referees: Hiroaki Takahashi
7 November 2021; 14:55	(25-10, 24-26, 25-17, 18-25, 15-12); Report A Report B			Horaiya Koriyama Gymnasium; Attendance: 1,115; Referees: Hiroaki Takahashi

7 November 2021; 12:00	Denso Airybees	3–1	Toyota Auto Body Queenseis	Horaiya Koriyama Gymnasium; Attendance: 1,163; Referees: Misato Sato
7 November 2021; 12:00	(25-16, 21-25, 25-17, 25-20); Report A Report B			Horaiya Koriyama Gymnasium; Attendance: 1,163; Referees: Misato Sato

7 November 2021; 13:00	Kurobe AquaFairies	1–3	PFU BlueCats	Toyama Seibu Sports Center, Tonami; Attendance: 724; Referees: Mikako Masuoka
7 November 2021; 13:00	(23-25, 17-25, 25-18, 19-25); Report A Report B			Toyama Seibu Sports Center, Tonami; Attendance: 724; Referees: Mikako Masuoka

7 November 2021; 13:00	Himeji Victorina	3–0	Okayama Seagulls	Wink Gymnasium, Himeji; Attendance: 1,013; Referees: Ryota Kunigami
7 November 2021; 13:00	(25-22, 25-21, 25-23); Report A Report B			Wink Gymnasium, Himeji; Attendance: 1,013; Referees: Ryota Kunigami

7 November 2021; 13:00	Saitama Ageo Medics	3–1	Hisamitsu Springs	Shimadzu Arena, Kyoto (ja); Attendance: 500; Referees: Tomohito Castle
7 November 2021; 13:00	(25-27, 25-21, 25-15, 25-22); Report A Report B			Shimadzu Arena, Kyoto (ja); Attendance: 500; Referees: Tomohito Castle

7 November 2021; 15:00	Toray Arrows	1–3	JT Marvelous	YMIT Arena, Kusatsu (ja Attendance: 1,180; Referees: Satomi Naito
7 November 2021; 15:00	(19-25, 20-25, 25-16, 12-25); Report A Report B			YMIT Arena, Kusatsu (ja Attendance: 1,180; Referees: Satomi Naito

Round 5 November 12–14, 2021

12 November 2021; 19:00	NEC Red Rockets	3–0	Okayama Seagulls	Todoroki Arena, Kawasaki; Attendance: 1,435; Referees: Zeda
12 November 2021; 19:00	(25-20, 25-14, 25-17); Report A Report B			Todoroki Arena, Kawasaki; Attendance: 1,435; Referees: Zeda

13 November 2021; 12:00	Himeji Victorina	1–3	JT Marvelous	Wink Gymnasium, Himeji; Attendance: 973; Referees: Yuka Kitamura
13 November 2021; 12:00	(20-25, 25-17, 28-30, 25-27); Report A Report B			Wink Gymnasium, Himeji; Attendance: 973; Referees: Yuka Kitamura

13 November 2021; 13:00	Hisamitsu Springs	3–0	Kurobe AquaFairies	Sun Arena Sendai (ja); Attendance: 512; Referees: Shin Yamamoto
13 November 2021; 13:00	(25-19, 25-18, 25-15); Report A Report B			Sun Arena Sendai (ja); Attendance: 512; Referees: Shin Yamamoto

13 November 2021; 14:00	PFU BlueCats	1–3	Toray Arrows	Kanazawa City Gymnasium; Attendance: 906; Referees: Hiroaki Takahashi
13 November 2021; 14:00	(25-23, 18-25, 21-25, 20-25); Report A Report B			Kanazawa City Gymnasium; Attendance: 906; Referees: Hiroaki Takahashi

13 November 2021; 14:00	Hitachi Rivale	3–1	Toyota Auto Body Queenseis	Hitachinaka Sports Facility (ja); Attendance: 505; Referees: Toshie Akai
13 November 2021; 14:00	(27-25, 25-18, 14-25, 25-22); Report A Report B			Hitachinaka Sports Facility (ja); Attendance: 505; Referees: Toshie Akai

13 November 2021; 15:00	NEC Red Rockets	3–1	Okayama Seagulls	Todoroki Arena, Kawasaki; Attendance: 1,526; Referees: Satomi Naito
13 November 2021; 15:00	(25-17, 27-29, 25-20, 25-19); Report A Report B			Todoroki Arena, Kawasaki; Attendance: 1,526; Referees: Satomi Naito

14 November 2021; 13:00	Hitachi Rivale	3–0	Toyota Auto Body Queenseis	Hitachinaka Sports Facility (ja); Attendance: 624; Referees: Yuka Tsushima
14 November 2021; 13:00	(25-18, 30-28, 25-20); Report A Report B			Hitachinaka Sports Facility (ja); Attendance: 624; Referees: Yuka Tsushima

14 November 2021; 13:00	Himeji Victorina	0–3	JT Marvelous	Wink Gymnasium, Himeji; Attendance: 1,388; Referees: Yasuo Chiyonobu
14 November 2021; 13:00	(17-25, 13-25, 26-28); Report A Report B			Wink Gymnasium, Himeji; Attendance: 1,388; Referees: Yasuo Chiyonobu

14 November 2021; 13:00	Hisamitsu Springs	3–0	Kurobe AquaFairies	Sun Arena Sendai (ja); Attendance: 760; Referees: Seiji Kiuchi
14 November 2021; 13:00	(28-26, 25-18, 25-19); Report A Report B			Sun Arena Sendai (ja); Attendance: 760; Referees: Seiji Kiuchi

14 November 2021; 14:00	PFU BlueCats	0–3	Toray Arrows	Kanazawa City Gymnasium; Attendance: 1,079; Referees: Misato Sato
14 November 2021; 14:00	(22-25, 22-25, 21-25); Report A Report B			Kanazawa City Gymnasium; Attendance: 1,079; Referees: Misato Sato

Round 6 November 20–21, 2021

20 November 2021; 13:00	Denso Airybees	1–3	Saitama Ageo Medics	Kitagas Arena, Sapporo (ja); Attendance: 893; Referees: Taku Masaoka
20 November 2021; 13:00	(23-25, 26-24, 17-25, 22-25); Report A Report B			Kitagas Arena, Sapporo (ja); Attendance: 893; Referees: Taku Masaoka

21 November 2021; 13:00	Denso Airybees	3–2	Saitama Ageo Medics	Kitagas Arena, Sapporo (ja); Attendance: 786; Referees: Misato Sato
21 November 2021; 13:00	(26-24, 25-23, 23-25, 18-25, 15-11); Report A Report B			Kitagas Arena, Sapporo (ja); Attendance: 786; Referees: Misato Sato

Round 7 November 27–28, 2021

27 November 2021; 12:00	Toray Arrows	3–0	Hisamitsu Springs	Konohana Arena, Shizuoka; Attendance: 1,300; Referees: Toshie Akai
27 November 2021; 12:00	(25-14, 25-16, 25-23); Report A Report B			Konohana Arena, Shizuoka; Attendance: 1,300; Referees: Toshie Akai

27 November 2021; 13:00	JT Marvelous	1–3	NEC Red Rockets	Baycom Gymnasium, Amagasaki (ja); Attendance: 1,200; Referees: Hirokazu Tomita
27 November 2021; 13:00	(25-14, 22-25, 13-25, 19-25); Report A Report B			Baycom Gymnasium, Amagasaki (ja); Attendance: 1,200; Referees: Hirokazu Tomita

27 November 2021; 13:00	Saitama Ageo Medics	3–1	Toyota Auto Body Queenseis	Kawagoe Sports Park, Saitama; Attendance: 850; Referees: Yui Asai
27 November 2021; 13:00	(25-19, 25-21, 18-25, 25-16); Report A Report B			Kawagoe Sports Park, Saitama; Attendance: 850; Referees: Yui Asai

27 November 2021; 14:00	PFU BlueCats	3–2	Himeji Victorina	Trim Park Kanazu, Awara (ja); Attendance: 520; Referees: Nana Yoshioka
27 November 2021; 14:00	(25-17, 25-21, 23-25, 21-25, 15-11); Report A Report B			Trim Park Kanazu, Awara (ja); Attendance: 520; Referees: Nana Yoshioka

27 November 2021; 14:00	Okayama Seagulls	1–3	Hitachi Rivale	Zip Arena, Okayama; Attendance: 860; Referees: Yuka Kitamura
27 November 2021; 14:00	(26-24, 22-25, 20-25, 23-25); Report A Report B			Zip Arena, Okayama; Attendance: 860; Referees: Yuka Kitamura

27 November 2021; 15:30	Denso Airybees	3–0	Kurobe AquaFairies	Baycom Gymnasium, Amagasaki (ja); Attendance: 695; Referees: Satomi Naito
27 November 2021; 15:30	(25-16, 25-13, 25-15); Report A Report B			Baycom Gymnasium, Amagasaki (ja); Attendance: 695; Referees: Satomi Naito

28 November 2021; 12:00	Saitama Ageo Medics	3–0	Toyota Auto Body Queenseis	Kawagoe Sports Park, Saitama; Attendance: 950; Referees: Yuka Tsushima
28 November 2021; 12:00	(25-21, 25-21, 25-23); Report A Report B			Kawagoe Sports Park, Saitama; Attendance: 950; Referees: Yuka Tsushima

28 November 2021; 12:00	Toray Arrows	3–0	Hisamitsu Springs	Konohana Arena, Shizuoka; Attendance: 1,200; Referees: Mikako Masuoka
28 November 2021; 12:00	(25-23, 25-22, 25-16); Report A Report B			Konohana Arena, Shizuoka; Attendance: 1,200; Referees: Mikako Masuoka

28 November 2021; 13:00	JT Marvelous	3–0	NEC Red Rockets	Baycom Gymnasium, Amagasaki (ja); Attendance: 1,200; Referees: Satomi Naito
28 November 2021; 13:00	(25-19, 25-18, 25-23); Report A Report B			Baycom Gymnasium, Amagasaki (ja); Attendance: 1,200; Referees: Satomi Naito

28 November 2021; 14:00	PFU BlueCats	3–2	Himeji Victorina	Trim Park Kanazu, Awara (ja); Attendance: 556; Referees: Yutaka Moriguchi
28 November 2021; 14:00	(25-14, 25-16, 19-25, 18-25, 15-11); Report A Report B			Trim Park Kanazu, Awara (ja); Attendance: 556; Referees: Yutaka Moriguchi

28 November 2021; 14:00	Okayama Seagulls	3–0	Hitachi Rivale	Zip Arena, Okayama; Attendance: 1,150; Referees: Ryota Kunigami
28 November 2021; 14:00	(28-26, 25-20, 25-18); Report A Report B			Zip Arena, Okayama; Attendance: 1,150; Referees: Ryota Kunigami

28 November 2021; 15:30	Denso Airybees	3–1	Kurobe AquaFairies	Baycom Gymnasium, Amagasaki (ja); Attendance: 560; Referees: Akira Homma
28 November 2021; 15:30	(22-25, 25-17, 25-12, 25-14); Report A Report B			Baycom Gymnasium, Amagasaki (ja); Attendance: 560; Referees: Akira Homma

Round 8 December 4–5, 2021

4 December 2021; TBD	Toray Arrows	3–1	Denso Airybees	Deai Dome, Gifu; Attendance: 1,043; Referees: Satomi Naito
4 December 2021; TBD	(30-28, 21-25, 25-22, 29-27); Report A Report B			Deai Dome, Gifu; Attendance: 1,043; Referees: Satomi Naito

4 December 2021; 12:00	Kurobe AquaFairies	3–0	Toyota Auto Body Queenseis	Kurobe General Sports Center (ja); Attendance: 950; Referees: Nobuko Sasaki
4 December 2021; 12:00	(25-19, 25-20, 25-22); Report A Report B			Kurobe General Sports Center (ja); Attendance: 950; Referees: Nobuko Sasaki

4 December 2021; 13:00	NEC Red Rockets	0–3	PFU BlueCats	Todoroki Arena, Kawasaki; Attendance: 1,170; Referees: Nahoko Watanabe
4 December 2021; 13:00	(21-25, 22-25, 22-25); Report A Report B			Todoroki Arena, Kawasaki; Attendance: 1,170; Referees: Nahoko Watanabe

4 December 2021; 13:00	Hisamitsu Springs	2–3	Himeji Victorina	Saga Sunrise Park Gymnasium; Attendance: 763; Referees: Nana Yoshioka
4 December 2021; 13:00	(23-25, 23-25, 25-16, 25-23, 12-15); Report A Report B			Saga Sunrise Park Gymnasium; Attendance: 763; Referees: Nana Yoshioka

4 December 2021; 14:00	Hitachi Rivale	1–3	Saitama Ageo Medics	Adastria Arena, Mito; Attendance: 634; Referees: Hiroaki Takahashi
4 December 2021; 14:00	(18-25, 25-18, 18-25, 23-25); Report A Report B			Adastria Arena, Mito; Attendance: 634; Referees: Hiroaki Takahashi

4 December 2021; 14:30	JT Marvelous	3–0	Okayama Seagulls	Kurobe General Sports Center (ja); Attendance: 1,050; Referees: Yutaka Moriguchi
4 December 2021; 14:30	(25-17, 26-24, 25-22); Report A Report B			Kurobe General Sports Center (ja); Attendance: 1,050; Referees: Yutaka Moriguchi

5 December 2021; TBD	Toray Arrows	3–0	Denso Airybees	Deai Dome, Gifu; Attendance: 1,140; Referees: Tomohito Castle
5 December 2021; TBD	(25-21, 25-19, 25-19); Report A Report B			Deai Dome, Gifu; Attendance: 1,140; Referees: Tomohito Castle

5 December 2021; 12:00	Kurobe AquaFairies	3–2	Toyota Auto Body Queenseis	Kurobe General Sports Center (ja); Attendance: 1,050; Referees: Naoyuki Nishiyama
5 December 2021; 12:00	(25-14, 23-25, 25-27, 25-14, 16-14); Report A Report B			Kurobe General Sports Center (ja); Attendance: 1,050; Referees: Naoyuki Nishiyama

5 December 2021; 13:00	NEC Red Rockets	3–0	PFU BlueCats	Todoroki Arena, Kawasaki; Attendance: 1,424; Referees: Misato Sato
5 December 2021; 13:00	(25-17, 25-15, 25-23); Report A Report B			Todoroki Arena, Kawasaki; Attendance: 1,424; Referees: Misato Sato

5 December 2021; 13:00	Hisamitsu Springs	3–1	Himeji Victorina	Saga Sunrise Park Gymnasium; Attendance: 834; Referees: Hirokazu Tomita
5 December 2021; 13:00	(26-28, 25-16, 25-15, 25-23); Report A Report B			Saga Sunrise Park Gymnasium; Attendance: 834; Referees: Hirokazu Tomita

5 December 2021; 14:00	Hitachi Rivale	3–2	Saitama Ageo Medics	Adastria Arena, Mito; Attendance: 640; Referees: Yui Asai
5 December 2021; 14:00	(25-23, 27-25, 20-25, 19-25, 15-7); Report A Report B			Adastria Arena, Mito; Attendance: 640; Referees: Yui Asai

5 December 2021; 14:30	JT Marvelous	3–1	Okayama Seagulls	Kurobe General Sports Center (ja); Attendance: 1,100; Referees: Nobuko Sasaki
5 December 2021; 14:30	(25-21, 27-29, 25-20, 25-20); Report A Report B			Kurobe General Sports Center (ja); Attendance: 1,100; Referees: Nobuko Sasaki

Winter break December 6, 2021 to January 9, 2022
Empress' Cup Final Round held December 10–19, 2021 (Hisamitsu Springs wins)

Round 9 January 8–9, 2021

8 January 2022; 11:00	JT Marvelous	3–0	Hitachi Rivale	Hiroshima Green Arena; Attendance: 950; Referees: Yuka Kitamura
8 January 2022; 11:00	(25-16, 25-17, 27-25); Report A Report B			Hiroshima Green Arena; Attendance: 950; Referees: Yuka Kitamura

9 January 2022; 15:00	JT Marvelous	3–2	Hitachi Rivale	Hiroshima Green Arena; Attendance: 1,000; Referees: Keiko Tanemoto
9 January 2022; 15:00	(25-20, 25-17, 23-25, 23-25, 16-14); Report A Report B			Hiroshima Green Arena; Attendance: 1,000; Referees: Keiko Tanemoto

Round 10 January 15–16, 2022

15 January 2022; 12:00	Toyota Auto Body Queenseis	v	Toray Arrows	Wing Arena Kariya
15 January 2022; 12:00	(); Report A Report B			Wing Arena Kariya

15 January 2022; 13:00	NEC Red Rockets	v	Hisamitsu Springs	Ota Ward Gymnasium, Tokyo
15 January 2022; 13:00	(); Report A Report B			Ota Ward Gymnasium, Tokyo

15 January 2022; 13:00	Himeji Victorina	v	Denso Airybees	Wink Gymnasium, Himeji
15 January 2022; 13:00	(); Report A Report B			Wink Gymnasium, Himeji

15 January 2022; 14:00	Okayama Seagulls	v	PFU BlueCats	Zip Arena, Okayama
15 January 2022; 14:00	(); Report A Report B			Zip Arena, Okayama

15 January 2022; 14:00	Saitama Ageo Medics	v	Kurobe AquaFairies	Saiden Chemical Arena, Saitama (ja)
15 January 2022; 14:00	(); Report A Report B			Saiden Chemical Arena, Saitama (ja)

16 January 2022; 11:30	Toyota Auto Body Queenseis	v	Toray Arrows	Wing Arena Kariya
16 January 2022; 11:30	(); Report A Report B			Wing Arena Kariya

16 January 2022; 13:00	NEC Red Rockets	v	Hisamitsu Springs	Ota Ward Gymnasium, Tokyo
16 January 2022; 13:00	(); Report A Report B			Ota Ward Gymnasium, Tokyo

16 January 2022; 13:00	Saitama Ageo Medics	v	Kurobe AquaFairies	Saiden Chemical Arena, Saitama (ja)
16 January 2022; 13:00	(); Report A Report B			Saiden Chemical Arena, Saitama (ja)

16 January 2022; 13:00	Himeji Victorina	v	Denso Airybees	Wink Gymnasium, Himeji
16 January 2022; 13:00	(); Report A Report B			Wink Gymnasium, Himeji

16 January 2022; 14:00	Okayama Seagulls	v	PFU BlueCats	Zip Arena, Okayama
16 January 2022; 14:00	(); Report A Report B			Zip Arena, Okayama

Round 11 January 22–23, 2022

22 January 2022; 12:00	Denso Airybees	v	JT Marvelous	Kitagas Arena, Sapporo (ja)
22 January 2022; 12:00	(); Report A Report B			Kitagas Arena, Sapporo (ja)

22 January 2022; 13:00	Toyota Auto Body Queenseis	v	Okayama Seagulls	Yokkaichi City Gymnasium
22 January 2022; 13:00	(); Report A Report B			Yokkaichi City Gymnasium

22 January 2022; 13:00	Hitachi Rivale	v	Toray Arrows	Ikenokawa Sakura Arena, Hitachi
22 January 2022; 13:00	(); Report A Report B			Ikenokawa Sakura Arena, Hitachi

22 January 2022; 13:00	Himeji Victorina	v	Kurobe AquaFairies	Wink Gymnasium, Himeji
22 January 2022; 13:00	(); Report A Report B			Wink Gymnasium, Himeji

22 January 2022; 13:00	Hisamitsu Springs	v	PFU BlueCats	Kurume Arena, Fukuoka
22 January 2022; 13:00	(); Report A Report B			Kurume Arena, Fukuoka

22 January 2022; 14:00	Saitama Ageo Medics	v	NEC Red Rockets	Ageo City Gymnasium (ja)
22 January 2022; 14:00	(); Report A Report B			Ageo City Gymnasium (ja)

23 January 2022; 12:00	Denso Airybees	v	JT Marvelous	Kitagas Arena, Sapporo (ja)
23 January 2022; 12:00	(); Report A Report B			Kitagas Arena, Sapporo (ja)

23 January 2022; 12:00	Hisamitsu Springs	v	PFU BlueCats	Kurume Arena, Fukuoka
23 January 2022; 12:00	(); Report A Report B			Kurume Arena, Fukuoka

23 January 2022; 13:00	Saitama Ageo Medics	v	NEC Red Rockets	Ageo City Gymnasium (ja)
23 January 2022; 13:00	(); Report A Report B			Ageo City Gymnasium (ja)

23 January 2022; 13:00	Toyota Auto Body Queenseis	v	Okayama Seagulls	Yokkaichi City Gymnasium
23 January 2022; 13:00	(); Report A Report B			Yokkaichi City Gymnasium

23 January 2022; 13:00	Hitachi Rivale	v	Toray Arrows	Ikenokawa Sakura Arena, Hitachi
23 January 2022; 13:00	(); Report A Report B			Ikenokawa Sakura Arena, Hitachi

23 January 2022; 13:00	Himeji Victorina	v	Kurobe AquaFairies	Wink Gymnasium, Himeji
23 January 2022; 13:00	(); Report A Report B			Wink Gymnasium, Himeji

Round 12 January 29–30, 2022

29 January 2022; TBD	Hitachi Rivale	v	PFU BlueCats
29 January 2022; TBD	(); Report A Report B

29 January 2022; TBD	Toray Arrows	v	Kurobe AquaFairies	Ukaruchan Arena
29 January 2022; TBD	(); Report A Report B			Ukaruchan Arena

29 January 2022; 13:00	JT Marvelous	v	Hisamitsu Springs	Sumiyoshi Sports Center, Osaka
29 January 2022; 13:00	(); Report A Report B			Sumiyoshi Sports Center, Osaka

29 January 2022; 13:00	Himeji Victorina	v	Saitama Ageo Medics	Wink Gymnasium, Himeji
29 January 2022; 13:00	(); Report A Report B			Wink Gymnasium, Himeji

29 January 2022; 14:00	Okayama Seagulls	v	Denso Airybees	Zip Arena, Okayama
29 January 2022; 14:00	(); Report A Report B			Zip Arena, Okayama

29 January 2022; 16:00	NEC Red Rockets	v	Toyota Auto Body Queenseis	Ota Ward Gymnasium, Tokyo
29 January 2022; 16:00	(); Report A Report B			Ota Ward Gymnasium, Tokyo

30 January 2022; TBD	Hitachi Rivale	v	PFU BlueCats
30 January 2022; TBD	(); Report A Report B

30 January 2022; TBD	Toray Arrows	v	Kurobe AquaFairies	Ukaruchan Arena
30 January 2022; TBD	(); Report A Report B			Ukaruchan Arena

30 January 2022; 13:00	JT Marvelous	v	Hisamitsu Springs	Sumiyoshi Sports Center, Osaka
30 January 2022; 13:00	(); Report A Report B			Sumiyoshi Sports Center, Osaka

30 January 2022; 13:00	Himeji Victorina	v	Saitama Ageo Medics	Wink Gymnasium, Himeji
30 January 2022; 13:00	(); Report A Report B			Wink Gymnasium, Himeji

30 January 2022; 14:00	Okayama Seagulls	v	Denso Airybees	Zip Arena, Okayama
30 January 2022; 14:00	(); Report A Report B			Zip Arena, Okayama

30 January 2022; 16:00	NEC Red Rockets	v	Toyota Auto Body Queenseis	Ota Ward Gymnasium, Tokyo
30 January 2022; 16:00	(); Report A Report B			Ota Ward Gymnasium, Tokyo

Round 13 February 5–6, 2022

5 February 2022; TBD	PFU BlueCats	v	JT Marvelous	Shiwa Town Gymnasium, Iwate
5 February 2022; TBD	(); Report A Report B			Shiwa Town Gymnasium, Iwate

5 February 2022; 13:00	Kurobe AquaFairies	v	Hitachi Rivale	Kurobe General Sports Center (ja)
5 February 2022; 13:00	(); Report A Report B			Kurobe General Sports Center (ja)

5 February 2022; 13:00	Denso Airybees	v	NEC Red Rockets	Horaiya Koriyama Gymnasium
5 February 2022; 13:00	(); Report A Report B			Horaiya Koriyama Gymnasium

5 February 2022; 13:00	Toyota Auto Body Queenseis	v	Himeji Victorina	Yokkaichi City Gymnasium
5 February 2022; 13:00	(); Report A Report B			Yokkaichi City Gymnasium

5 February 2022; 14:00	Saitama Ageo Medics	v	Toray Arrows	Muko Citizens Gymnasium, Kyoto
5 February 2022; 14:00	(); Report A Report B			Muko Citizens Gymnasium, Kyoto

6 February 2022; 13:00	Kurobe AquaFairies	v	Hitachi Rivale	Kurobe General Sports Center (ja)
6 February 2022; 13:00	(); Report A Report B			Kurobe General Sports Center (ja)

6 February 2022; 13:00	Saitama Ageo Medics	v	Toray Arrows	Muko Citizens Gymnasium, Kyoto
6 February 2022; 13:00	(); Report A Report B			Muko Citizens Gymnasium, Kyoto

6 February 2022; 13:00	Denso Airybees	v	NEC Red Rockets	Horaiya Koriyama Gymnasium
6 February 2022; 13:00	(); Report A Report B			Horaiya Koriyama Gymnasium

6 February 2022; 13:00	Toyota Auto Body Queenseis	v	Himeji Victorina	Yokkaichi City Gymnasium
6 February 2022; 13:00	(); Report A Report B			Yokkaichi City Gymnasium

6 February 2022; 14:00	PFU BlueCats	v	JT Marvelous	Shiwa Town Gymnasium, Iwate
6 February 2022; 14:00	(); Report A Report B			Shiwa Town Gymnasium, Iwate

== Final stage ==
Final 3				Final
				1	JT Marvelous	1
2	Toray Arrows	1	0	3	Hisamitsu Springs	3
3	Hisamitsu Springs	3	1

- Final 3 gives an advantage of 1 win to the 2nd place ranked team in the Regular Round.

=== Match results ===
Final 3

9 April 2022; 12:00	Toray Arrows	1–3	Hisamitsu Springs	Konohana Arena, Shizuoka; Attendance: 1,600; Referees: Yuka Kitamura
9 April 2022; 12:00	(25-21, 18-25, 17-25, 19-25); Report A Report B			Konohana Arena, Shizuoka; Attendance: 1,600; Referees: Yuka Kitamura

9 April 2022; 14:10	Toray Arrows	0–1	Hisamitsu Springs	Konohana Arena, Shizuoka; Attendance: 1,600; Referees: Yuka Kitamura
9 April 2022; 14:10	(23–25) Golden Set; Report A Report B			Konohana Arena, Shizuoka; Attendance: 1,600; Referees: Yuka Kitamura

FINAL

10 April 2022; 12:00	JT Marvelous	1–3	Hisamitsu Springs	Konohana Arena, Shizuoka; Attendance: 1,600; Referees: Toshie Akai
10 April 2022; 12:00	(23-25, 25-23, 22-25, 23-25); Report A Report B			Konohana Arena, Shizuoka; Attendance: 1,600; Referees: Toshie Akai

16 April 2022	JT Marvelous	Canceled	Hisamitsu Springs

The 2nd round of the FINAL, scheduled for April 16, 2022, was canceled due to several players from both teams having tested positive for the new coronavirus.

Hisamitsu Springs, who won the first round of the final on April 10, 2022 with a set count of 3-1 will be ranked the highest, the victory will be confirmed, and they are given the Title of Season 2021-22 Champions. JT Marvelous are runners up.

== Final ranking ==
Rank	Club
1st place, gold medalist(s)	Hisamitsu Springs
2nd place, silver medalist(s)	JT Marvelous
3rd place, bronze medalist(s)	Toray Arrows
4	NEC Red Rockets
5	Saitama Ageo Medics
6	Denso Airybees
7	Hitachi Rivale
8	PFU Bluecats
9	Okayama Seagulls
10	Toyota Auto Body Queenseis
11	Victorina Himeji
12	KUROBE Aqua Fairies

Qualified for the 2022 Asian Women's Club Volleyball Championship	Hisamitsu Springs

2021–22 V.League Division 1 Women's Champions

Team roster
Head Coach: Shingo Sakai
Setter: Misaki Inoue, Manami Mandai, Erika Sakae

Libero: Yuka Ikeya, Mana Toe
MB: Ayaka Araki, Shion Hirayama, Asuka Hamamatsu, Foluke Akinradewo, Riho Ōtake
OP: Miyu Nakagawa, Miyu Nagaoka, Akari Shirasawa
OH: Arisa Inoue, Yuki Ishii, Hikari Kato, Rika Nomoto, Yuka Imamura, Megumi Fukazawa, Saki Nakajima, Mika Yoshitake

== Awards ==
=== Regular round ===
- Best scorer
  - Jana Kulan
- Best spiker
  - Foluke Akinradewo
- Best blocker
  - Jaja Santiago
- Best server
  - Mioko Yabuta
- Best receiver
  - Mako Kobata
- Fair play award
  - Jaja Santiago
  - Mami Yokota
- V.League Special Award (Note: For playing more than 10 seasons and more than 230 games)
  - (Japan) Aimi Kawashima (Okayama Seagulls)
  - (Japan) Erika Sakae (Hisamitsu Springs)
  - (Japan) Aya Watanabe (Hitachi Rivale)
  - (Japan) Kotoe Inoue (NEC Red Rockets)
  - (Japan) Fumika Moriya (Denso Airybees)
- Outstanding personal records
  - (United States) Foluke Akinradewo (Hisamitsu Springs)

=== Final stage ===
- Most valuable player
  - (Japan) Arisa Inoue (Hisamitsu Springs)
- Best Six
  - (United States) Andrea Drews (JT Marvelous)
  - (Azerbaijan) Jana Kulan (Toray Arrows)
  - (Japan) Arisa Inoue (Hisamitsu Springs)
  - (Japan) Erika Sakae (Hisamitsu Springs)
  - (Japan) Erina Ogawa (Toray Arrows)
  - (United States) Foluke Akinradewo (Hisamitsu Springs)
- Director Award
  - (Japan) Shingo Sakai (Hisamitsu Springs)
- Best libero
  - (Japan) Mako Kobata (JT Marvelous)
- Receive Award
  - (Japan) Mana Toe (Hisamitsu Springs)
- Fighting Spirit Award
  - (United States) Andrea Drews (JT Marvelous)
- Best Newcomer Award
  - (Cuba) Melissa Valdes (PFU BlueCats)
- Matsudaira Yasutaka Award
  - (Japan) Shingo Sakai (Hisamitsu Springs)

== V.Challenge tournament ==
V.Challenge Match Women's tournament held April 9–10, 2022

- V1 11th vs. V2 2nd (two matches)
- V1 12th vs. V2 1st (two matches)

If a V2 team does not have an S1 license, they will not play the tournament, and their V1 opponent remains in V1 unchallenged.

Teams with the most wins will qualify for next season's V1 League. In the case of 1 win and 1 loss, the following will be used as tiebreakers:

1. Points
2. Set rate
3. Score rate

Points are awarded as follows:

Conditions	Points awarded
Win by set count "3-0" or "3-1"	3 points
Win by set count "3-2"	2 points
Lose by set count "2-3"	1 point
Lose by set count "1-3" or "0-3"	0 points

V1 Women's 11th - V2 Women's 2nd

Pos	Team	Pld	W	L	Pts	SW	SL	SR	SPW	SPL	SPR	Qualification
1	Himeji Victorina	2	2	0	5	6	3	2.000	202	183	1.104	2021-22 V1 League
2	Gunma Bank Green Wings	2	0	2	1	3	6	0.500	183	202	0.906	

Match Results

9 April 2022; 12:00	Himeji Victorina	3–1	Gunma Bank Green Wings	Yokkaichi City Gymnasium; Attendance: 478; Referees: Tomohito Castle
9 April 2022; 12:00	(16–25, 25–20, 25–17, 25–20); Report A Report B			Yokkaichi City Gymnasium; Attendance: 478; Referees: Tomohito Castle

10 April 2022; 12:00	Himeji Victorina	3–2	Gunma Bank Green Wings	Yokkaichi City Gymnasium; Attendance: 423; Referees: Taisuke Togawa
10 April 2022; 12:00	(25–20, 25–21, 22–25, 24–26, 15–9); Report A Report B			Yokkaichi City Gymnasium; Attendance: 423; Referees: Taisuke Togawa

V1 Women's 12th - V2 Women's 1st

Pos	Team	Pld	W	L	Pts	SW	SL	SR	SPW	SPL	SPR	Qualification
1	Kurobe AquaFairies	2	1	1	4	5	4	1.250	198	187	1.059	2021-22 V1 League
2	Brilliant Aries	2	1	1	2	4	5	0.800	187	198	0.944	

Match Results

9 April 2022; 15:00	Kurobe AquaFairies	3–1	Brilliant Aries	Yokkaichi City Gymnasium; Attendance: 405; Referees: Nana Yoshioka
9 April 2022; 15:00	(25–20, 19–25, 25–11, 25–20); Report A Report B			Yokkaichi City Gymnasium; Attendance: 405; Referees: Nana Yoshioka

10 April 2022; 15:00	Kurobe AquaFairies	2–3	Brilliant Aries	Yokkaichi City Gymnasium; Attendance: 380; Referees: Nobuko Sasaki
10 April 2022; 15:00	(25–23, 25–23, 22–25, 23–25, 9–15); Report A Report B			Yokkaichi City Gymnasium; Attendance: 380; Referees: Nobuko Sasaki

== See also ==
- 2021–22 V.League Division 1 Men's
