= Andrea Drews =

American volleyball player (born 1993)

Annie Drews
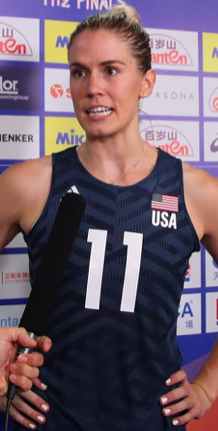
- Drews at the 2019 Volleyball National League

Personal information
- Full name: Andrea Carrie Drews
- Nickname: Annie
- Nationality: American
- Born: December 25, 1993 (age 32); Muncie, Indiana, United States
- Hometown: Elkhart, Indiana, U.S.
- Height: 192 cm (6 ft 4 in)
- Weight: 77 kg (170 lb)
- Spike: 315 cm (124 in)
- Block: 312 cm (123 in)
- Education: Purdue University

Volleyball information
- Position: Opposite
- Current club: (United States) LOVB Madison
- Number: 11 (national team) 11 (LOVB Madison)

Career
| Years | Teams |
|---|---|
| 2016 | (Puerto Rico) Indias de Mayagüez |
| 2017 | (Puerto Rico) Criollas de Caguas |
| 2017–18 | (Italy) SAB Volley Legnano |
| 2018 | (Italy) Pomí Casalmaggiore |
| 2018–19 | (Turkey) Beylikdüzü Voleybol |
| 2019–22 | (Japan) JT Marvelous |
| 2023 | (Italy) Megabox Volley Vallefoglia |
| 2023–24 | (Japan) JT Marvelous |
| 2024- | (United States) LOVB Madison |

National team
| 2017–2024 | United States |
Medal record
Women's volleyball
Representing the United States
Olympic Games
| Gold medal – first place | 2020 Tokyo | Team |
| Silver medal – second place | 2024 Paris | Team |
World Cup
| Silver medal – second place | 2019 Japan | Team |
World Grand Champions Cup
| Bronze medal – third place | 2017 Japan | Team |
FIVB Nations League
| Gold medal – first place | 2018 Nanjing | Team |
| Gold medal – first place | 2019 Nanjing | Team |
| Gold medal – first place | 2021 Rimini | Team |
NORCECA Championship
| Silver medal – second place | 2019 San Juan |
Pan-American Cup
| Gold medal – first place | 2017 Cañete/Lima |

Andrea Carrie "Annie" Drews (born December 25, 1993) is an American professional volleyball player for the United States women's national volleyball team. Drews was elected as the Most Valuable Player of the 2019 FIVB Women's Volleyball Nations League in Nanjing, China, where Team USA won the gold medal and the Best Opposite of the 2019 FIVB Volleyball Women's World Cup where the U.S. finished in second place. She won gold with the national team at the 2020 Tokyo Summer Olympics.

== Early life ==
Drews grew up in Elkhart, Indiana. Her parents are Mike Drews and Carrie Drews. Her father played basketball at Ball State University and coached high school basketball for ten years. Her brother, Derek Drews, also played basketball at Western Michigan University. She also has a sister, Erin Courey, who is an artist in Grand Rapids, MI.

As a child, Drews played many sports other than volleyball, including basketball, cheerleading, tennis, and track. She attended Elkhart Central High School before transferring to play volleyball at Penn High School.

== High school and collegiate years ==
=== Formative years and high school ===
Drews started playing indoor club volleyball in 2008 with Network Juniors and concluded her youth club career with Northern Indiana Volleyball Academy. She was a two-time volleyball state champion at Penn High School.

=== Purdue University ===
Drews began her sporting career in school tournaments. After emerging as one of the nation's top prep players at Penn High, she headed to Purdue University's women volleyball team, with which she took part in the NCAA Division I Championships from 2012 to 2015. "The monster of the Big Ten," Purdue coach Dave Shondell called Drews. She was an All-America outside hitter.

Drews received an honorable mention at the AVCA All-American in 2014. Moreover, Drews was selected AVCA Second-Team All-America in 2015 as a senior at Purdue University. She graduated from Purdue University in Hospitality and Tourism Management in 2015.

== Career ==
=== Junior national team ===
She was a member of the U.S. Women's National A2 Program (now known as U.S. Collegiate National Team) in 2013.

=== Club teams ===
==== 2016: Indias de Mayagüez (PUR) ====
In 2015, she began her professional career at 2016 Liga de Voleibol Superior Femenino where was finished runner-up with Indias de Mayagüez. She was named as part of the all-star team at the end of the tournament.

==== 2017: Criollas de Caguas (PUR) ====
In the following season, she played with Criollas de Caguas. Drews was named the league's MVP after leading Caquas Criollas to a 16–0 start and the Puerto Rican title. Her performance started catching the eye of Kiraly and SASB Volleyball Legano, the club in Italy's Serie A1 she eventually signed with.

==== 2017-2018: SAB Volley Legnano & Pomi Casalmaggiore (ITA) ====
In the 2017-18 championship she played in the Italian A1 Series in the newly promoted SAB Volley Legnano, ending her contract with the team in December 2017. In January 2018 she signed a contract with another Italian team, Casalmaggiore.

==== 2018-2019: Kameroglu Beylikdüzü Voleybol Ihtisas (TUR) ====
During the 2018-2019 pro season, she signed with Kameroglu Beylikdüzü Voleybol Ihtisas and played at the Turkish Volleyball League. She played the play-off quarterfinals and finished as the third-best scorer in the regular season with 384 points. She helped the club reach its best finish in the league since its inception.

==== 2019-present: JT Marvelous (JPN) & Megabox Volley Vallefoglia (ITA) ====
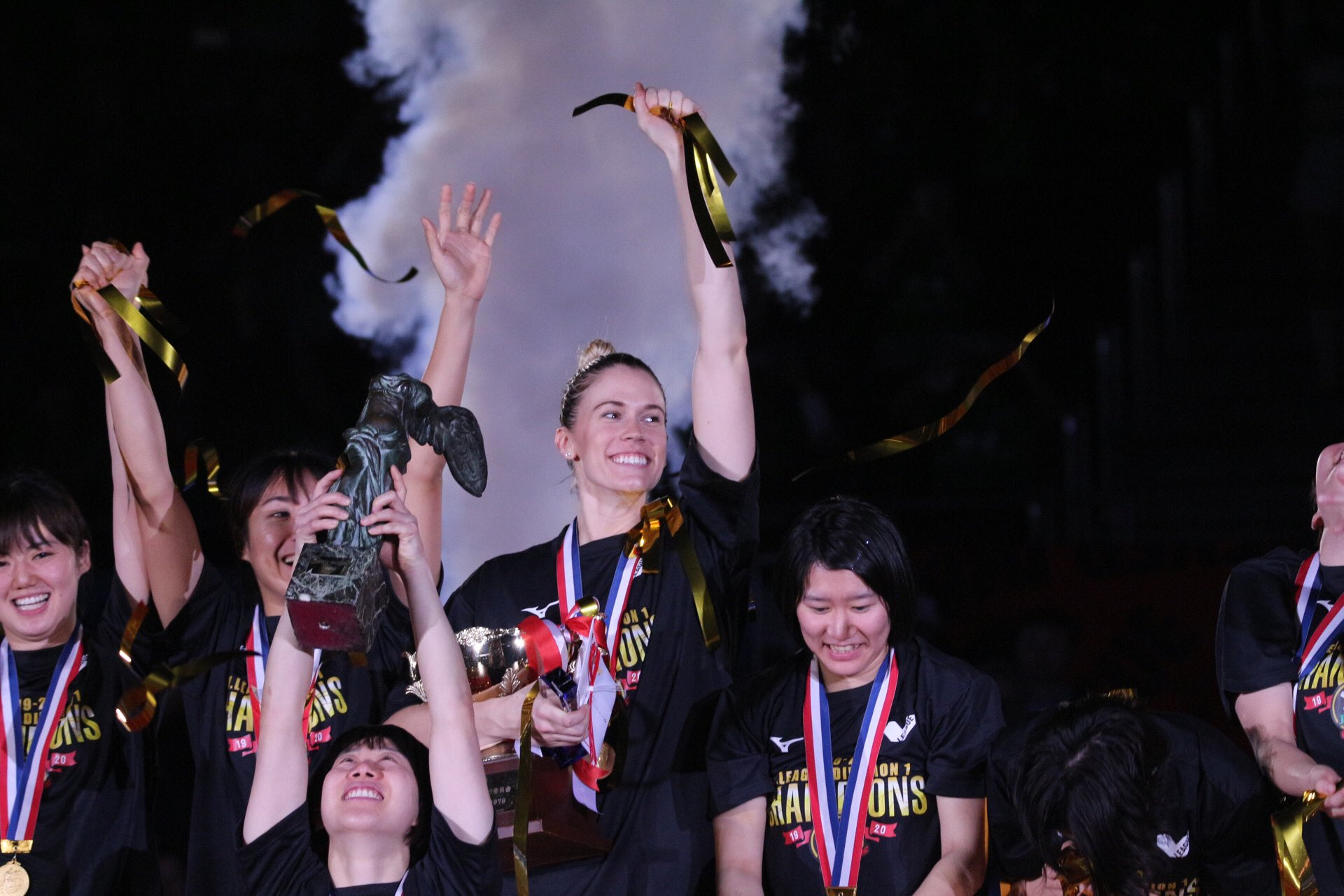
Drews bags V.League title and MVP

In 2019, Drews signed with JT Marvelous to play in the Japan V.League Division 1 (V1), replacing Serbia women's national volleyball team outside hitter Brankica Mihajlović. Due to prior commitments with the USA national team (participation in the 2019 Women's NORCECA Volleyball Continental Championship), she missed the season's first two games. In her debut game with the team, she registered 32 points against Ageo Medics. For her performance throughout the tournament, Drews was named Best Opposite and Most Valuable Player.

Drews continued playing with JT Marvelous through the end of the 2021–2022 season. In 2023, she joined Megabox Volley Vallefoglia in Italy. In 2023, Drews returned to JT Marvelous.

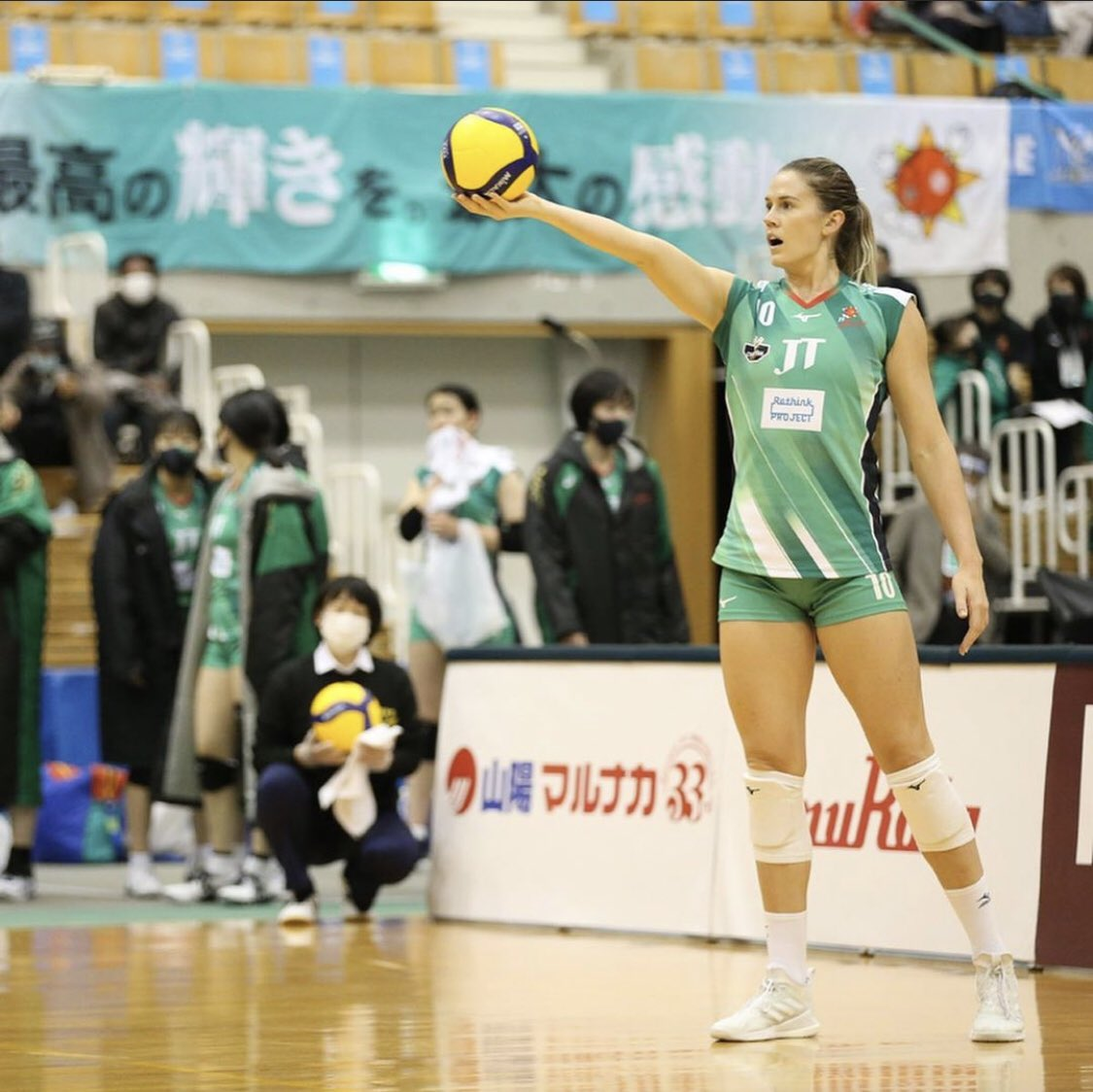
Drews prepares to serve a ball for JT Marvelous in 2020/21 season

=== Senior national team ===
==== 2017 ====
===== 2017 Women's Pan-American Volleyball Cup =====
Drews first joined the USA senior national volleyball team in 2017. She was recruited by Karch Kiraly, who returned as the head coach of the team that year after Rio Olympic Games in 2016. Kiraly brought Drews into Team USA's summer camp in Anaheim, California. When Drews joined the team, she was behind many of the players who had been in the Team USA gym since May 1 as the Puerto Rican league playoffs went through mid-May. Drews debuted for the United States national team later that year. Used primarily as the opposite in the double-sub with just two match starts, Drews led Team USA in scoring in three (against Columbia, Mexico and Argentina) of its first five matches in its gold medal run at the 2017 Women's Pan-American Volleyball Cup in June.

===== 2017 USA Volleyball Cup =====
Drews led Team USA past fourth-ranked Brazil with a 21-point performance to open the 2017 USA Volleyball Cup in Anaheim on a Sunday evening. Drews powered down 16 kills on 38 swings against Brazil while adding four blocks and an ace over the course of the four sets, with final set a bonus set after the Americans won the first three sets 25–21, 25–14, 29–27. However, in the official three sets of the match, Drews was her most dominant having 14 kills on 26 attacks with just three errors to go with three blocks and an ace. And she was able to have such a break-out match on American soil with her family in the stands watching.

"I think it has been awesome," Drews said immediately after the Brazil match. "The longer I get into my career, the more moments like this will stand out when we do get to play on American soil and have our families here. USA has been awesome about having our families able to come to practice and they are here tonight."

===== 2017 FIVB Volleyball World Grand Prix =====
Kiraly left Drews in Anaheim for the first rounds of the 2017 FIVB Volleyball World Grand Prix. Drews took advantage of being one of only two opposites in the two- and three-hour sessions in the gym back in Orange County.

"When you only have two (opposites), you're getting a ton, a ton of touches," Drews said. "There are some benefits to being in the home group when the team is traveling because you get so many reps. I think being so new to this system I really wanted to take advantage of those reps and see if I could get a lot better."

The extra work paid off with a spot on the U.S. roster for the 2017 FIVB Volleyball World Grand Prix finals round. Although the U.S. did not win either of its Finals Round matches against Serbia and Italy, Drews came off the bench in both contests to provide a huge spark. Drews was the U.S.' top scorer (16 points: 15 kills in 39 swings for a 38.46% hitting efficiency; and 1 ace) in a 3–1 loss to Italy. She racked up with 10 points (10/26 for a 38.46% hitting efficiency) in USA's faltered comeback attempt from being down 2 sets to none against Serbia. USA finished 5th at the final staging of the World Grand Prix, tied with Netherlands.

===== 2017 FIVB Volleyball Women's World Grand Champions Cup =====
Drews returned for duty as she joined the U.S. team for the 2017 FIVB Volleyball Women's World Grand Champions Cup. She started at opposite for all matches and top-scored in 2 occasions - 22 points vs. Japan and 12 points vs. Brazil. In its win over Korea, 25–22, 25–20, 25–16, Drews contributed 11 points on eight kills, two blocks and an ace. She helped USA claim the bronze medal for the tournament.

==== 2018 ====
===== 2018 FIVB Volleyball Women's Nations League =====
In 2018, Drews joined the U.S. team in the inaugural 2018 FIVB Volleyball Women's Nations League where they eventually won gold against Turkey (25–17, 22–25, 28–26, 15–25, 7–15).

==== 2019 ====
===== 2019 FIVB Volleyball Women's Nations League =====
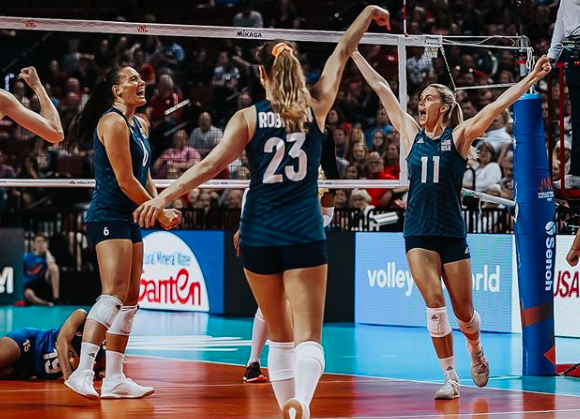
Drews at the 2019 Nations League

Drews returned for another round of duty for the U.S. team in the 2019 FIVB Volleyball Women's Nations League. During the preliminary rounds, she led the Best Attackers race with a 205-68-426 attacking card, good for 48.12% hitting efficiency. After advancing to the final round, Drews once again ranked first in the Best Attackers chart with a 69-18-132 attacking card, good for 52.27 hitting efficiency. She was the 2nd Best Scorer with 69 attacks, 4 blocks and 4 aces for 77 points, behind top scorer Liu Yanhan's (China) 79 points.

Annie Drews led Team USA with 23 points, including 21 kills on 41 attacks, one block and one ace against Poland in the finals pool play. Drews did not see action in the pool play match against Brazil to give way for Jordan Thompson. Drews scored 21 points in the semifinals against China to lead Team USA to victory. Drews had 16 kills on 31 swings, three aces and two blocks.

In the Gold Medal Match, Drews was named Most Valuable Player after leading USA to victory, including a team-high 33 points against Brazil in the title match. Drews hit 32/59 and added one block. The comeback concluded in high drama in the fifth set with an unusual ending. Although Brazil earned the first two-point cushion of the tiebreaking fifth set at 3–1, Team USA bounced back to take its first lead of the set at 5–4 with two Robinson kills after a Brazil service error. The Americans extended the advantage to three at 8–5 with a Drews kill, Robinson ace and Larson kill. Brazil closed to one at 10–9. Team USA went up 13–10 with kills from Drews and Haleigh Washington. Brazil saved two match points at 14–13. In a bold move, Coach Karch Kiraly called for a video challenge for net touch during the middle of match point and Team USA won the points as the video clearly showed Brazil touching the net antenna. After the win, Kiraly did not spare kind words for the tournament MVP Andrea Drews after the match

"Wow, Annie. I don't know how many points she had, but she was huge. Everyone was huge. What a great team win, fall down 2-0 against one of the greatest teams in the world, Brazil. Jordan Larson came in and gave us a great lift, Tori Dixon also. It was a total team win, 14-person plus here, all the other people in our program including the 14 battling in Peru. Total team effort. So much to be proud of. We got better as the match went along. We improved our blocking lineups, had a nice passing lineup in there. Lauren Carlini doing a really nice job of running our offense and distributing."

===== 2019 FIVB Women's Volleyball Intercontinental Olympic Qualification Tournament =====
On 2–4 August, Drews competed with USA in the 2019 FIVB Women's Volleyball Intercontinental Olympic Qualifications Tournament (IOQT) in CenturyLink Center, Shreveport-Bossier City, United States. After matches against Kazakhstan (3–0), Bulgaria (3–2) and Argentina (3–0), USA qualified for the Tokyo Olympic Games in 2020. As a result of their second-place finish in the 2019 FIVB Volleyball Women's World Cup, USA's FIVB World Rankings points led them to become the 2nd-best team in the world as of October 2019. This put them at Pool B during the Olympic Games in 2020.

===== 2019 FIVB Volleyball Women's World Cup =====
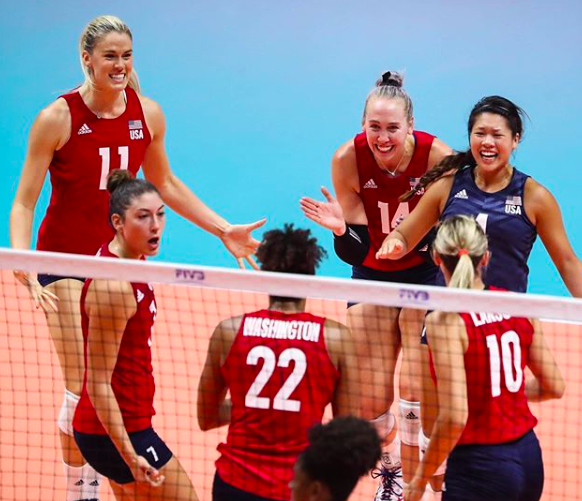
Drews and USA at the 2019 FIVB Women's World Cup

Drews was lined-up for another round of NT duties at the 2019 FIVB Volleyball Women's World Cup in Japan from September 14–29. Drews started at opposite for most of the time but also shared lineups with Karsta Lowe. In their first match against Kenya, Drews hit 12 attacks on 22 swings (54.45% hitting efficiency) and added 2 aces to top-score at 14 points. Drews hit 10 attacks on 23 swings (43.47% hitting efficiency), had a stuff block and an ace in their 3–0 win against the Netherlands. USA bagged another impressive straight sets victory against Brazil with Drews having 12 attacks on 27 swings (44.44% hitting efficiency) and 2 stuff blocks for 14 points. In their 3-set loss against eventual gold medalists China, Drews, used sparingly, contributed 6 kills on 12 swings (50% hitting efficiency). In their bounce-back win against Dominican Republic, Drews posted an impressive 23 points in 3 sets mounted from 18 attacks on 29 swings (62.07% hitting efficiency), 3 stuff blocks and 2 aces. USA gutted out a 5-set outing against Russia anchored on Drew's 20 attacks on 46 swings (43.48% hitting efficiency), 1 stuff block and 1 ace.

In their final match of the tournament vs. South Korea, Drews gave out an impressive 20 attacks on 41 swings (48.78% hitting efficiency), 2 stuff blocks and 2 aces for 24 points. South Korea women's national volleyball team head coach, Stefano Lavarini, gave praise to Drews' performance in the post-match interview saying:

"We couldn't put pressure on their service and the United States in the first two sets, but especially the second, played really strong and their attackers were almost unstoppable, most especially their incredible opposite Andrew Drews. You got Boskovic and Egonu and now I think she's the one to watch."

Drews was the league's 17th Best Scorer (105 attacks, 9 blocks, and 9 aces) and 3rd Best Attacker (105-29-225 for a 46.67% hitting efficiency). Her performance merited the team and her a silver medal finish and a Best Opposite award.

===== 2019 Women's NORCECA Volleyball Championship =====
For the final round of 2019 national team duty, Drews was lined-up for the 2019 Women's NORCECA Volleyball Continental Championship held in San Juan, Puerto Rico from 8–13 October. Drews was inserted as a starter during the second and third set of their pool play match against Mexico. USA eventually won the match in straight sets as she added eight kills on 14 swings and a block for nine points. During the finals, Drews came in as a substitute on the second set for teammate Karsta Lowe in the opposite position. She totalled 12 kills on 33 attacks (35.94% hitting efficiency) and chipped in 6 digs. USA eventually settled for silver for the tournament.

===== 2019 USA Volleyball Awards =====
After a breakout year with the USA WNVT, Drews was selected as the 2019 USA Volleyball Female Indoor Player of the Year. She sparked the U.S. Women's National Team to three tournament podium finishes (one gold, two silvers) in events she competed during 2019, all while being selected to two FIVB tournament dream teams. Drews tallied a Team USA-high 388 points in 2019 with a 4.56 scoring average per set, second most among players with at least one start. For the season, Drews started 23 matches and played in 85 sets compiling 3.94 kills, 0.35 blocks and 0.27 aces per set. She converted 46.3 percent of her attacks into points with a .317 hitting efficiency. Her defense improved throughout 2019 with 107 digs for a 1.26 dig average.

"I am beyond grateful to represent USA Volleyball and for all of the opportunities I got to experience in 2019 with our team," Drews said. "We have so many talented players and impactful women in our program and I'm just honored to continue to learn and grow alongside some of the best. Thank you to our team and staff for all of the work put in to make 2019 a successful year for USA Volleyball."

Drews claimed the most valuable player honor at the 2019 FIVB Volleyball Nations League and was selected as Best Opposite on the 2019 FIVB World Cup Dream Team. She averaged 4.70 points per set during the VNL, starting 12 of the 19 matches. She held a .315 hitting efficiency while converting 47.6 percent of her attacks into points. She averaged 4.08 kills, 0.34 blocks and 0.28 aces per set during the VNL. Drews started nine of the 11 World Cup matches and converted 45.3 percent of her attacks into points with a .324 hitting efficiency. She averaged 3.92 kills, 0.38 blocks and 0.31 aces per set for a 4.62 scoring average.

==== 2021 ====
===== 2021 FIVB Volleyball Women's Nations League =====
In May 2021, she was named to the 18-player roster for the 2021 FIVB Volleyball Women's Nations League tournament that was played in Rimini, Italy. It was the only major international competition before the Tokyo Olympics in July. She was one of two opposites selected for the tournament alongside Jordan Thompson. Her debut match against Canada saw her scoring 20 points (19-4-37 att, 51.4% hitting efficiency; 1 ace) to lead the US in a straight-sets victory. Against Brazil, Drews scored 16 points (15-7-37 att, 40.5% hitting efficiency; 1 ace) in their four-set win. Drews scored 11 points (9-4-25 att, 36% hitting efficiency; 2 blks) in their victory against the Netherlands. USA again routed Germany in straight sets following Drews' 17 points (17-0-26 att, 65.4% hitting efficiency). USA capped their third round of VNL action beating Italy, three sets to one, led by Drews' 20 points (18-3-30 att, 60% hitting efficiency; 2 aces).

FIVB Volleyball Women's Nations League 2021: Andrea Drews Statistics Summary
Preliminary round
| Match date | Opponent | Result | Spiking | | | | | Blocking | | Serving | | Total |
| Match date | Opponent | Result | Spikes | Faults | Attempts | Success | Hit Pct | Blocks | B/S | Aces | A/S | Total |
|---|---|---|---|---|---|---|---|---|---|---|---|---|
| May 25 | Canada | 3-0 (W) | 19 | 4 | 37 | 51.4% | 0.405 | - | - | 1 | 0.33 | 20 |
| May 27 | Brazil | 3-1 (W) | 15 | 7 | 37 | 40.5% | 0.216 | - | - | 1 | 0.25 | 16 |
| June 1 | Netherlands | 3-0 (W) | 9 | 4 | 25 | 36.0% | 0.200 | 2 | 0.67 | - | - | 11 |
| June 6 | Germany | 3-0 (W) | 17 | 0 | 26 | 65.4% | 0.654 | - | - | - | - | 17 |
| June 8 | Italy | 3-1 (W) | 18 | 3 | 30 | 60.0% | 0.500 | - | - | 2 | 0.50 | 20 |
| Subtotal performance | | | 78 | 18 | 155 | 50.3% | 0.387 | 2 | 0.12 | 4 | 0.24 | 84 |
| Overall total performance | | | 78 | 18 | 155 | 50.3% | 0.387 | 2 | 0.12 | 4 | 0.24 | 84 |

===== 2020 Summer Olympic Games in Tokyo =====
On June 7, 2021, US National Team head coach Karch Kiraly announced she would be part of the 12-player Olympic roster for the 2020 Summer Olympics in Tokyo. Drews was initially slotted as for an off-the-bench role but assumed starting opposite duties when Jordan Thompson went down with an ankle injury. She started in the pool play match against Italy, leading the United States to a 5-set victory. After landing at the top of their pool, the United States went unbeaten in the medal rounds, winning all their matches without dropping a single set. Drews top scored for the team in all four matches, leading the United States Women's Volleyball Team to its inaugural gold medal at the indoor volleyball event in Tokyo.

==== 2022 ====
===== 2022 FIVB Volleyball Women's Nations League =====
In May 2022, Drews made her return to the national team after winning the gold medal at the Tokyo Olympics for the 2022 FIVB Volleyball Women's Nations League. Drews helped the team clinch a 3–1 record in the first week, top scoring for the games she started.

==== 2024 Summer Olympic Games in Paris ====
On June 5, 2024, it was announced that Drews would be returning to represent the United States in her second Olympic Games at the 2024 Summer Olympics in Paris. With Team USA, she won the silver medal against Italian Team.

== Personal life ==
Drews graduated from Purdue University with a degree in Hospitality and Tourism Management in 2015. On June 15, 2020, Drews and Tanner Schumacher announced their engagement. On September 6, 2021, Drews married Schumacher.

== Clubs ==
- (Puerto Rico) Indias de Mayagüez (2016)
- (Puerto Rico) Criollas de Caguas (2017)
- (Italy) SAB Volley Legnano (2017–2018)
- (Italy) Pomi Casalmaggiore (2018)
- (Turkey) Kameroglu Beylikdüzü Voleybol Ihtisas (2018–2019)
- (Japan) JT Marvelous (2019–2022)
- (Italy) Megabox Volley Vallefoglia (2023)
- (Japan) JT Marvelous (2023–2024)
- (United States) LOVB Madison (2024–present)

== Awards and honors ==
=== United States national team ===
- 2017 Women's Pan-American Volleyball Cup - Champion
- 2017 USA Volleyball Cup - Champion
- 2017 FIVB Volleyball Women's World Grand Champions Cup - Bronze medal
- 2018 FIVB Volleyball Women's Nations League - Gold medal
- 2019 FIVB Volleyball Women's Nations League - Gold medal
- 2019 FIVB Women's Volleyball Intercontinental Olympic Qualifications Tournament (IOQT) - Gold medal, Qualified for Tokyo 2020
- 2019 FIVB Women's World Cup - Runner-Up
- 2019 Women's NORCECA Volleyball Continental Championship - Silver medal
- 2021 FIVB Volleyball Women's Nations League - Gold medal
- 2021 2020 Summer Olympics - Gold medal
- 2022 USA Volleyball Cup - Champion
- 2024 2024 Summer Olympics - Silver medal

=== Individuals ===
- 2012 BIG 10 All-Freshman Team
- 2014 Honorable Mention AVCA All-American
- 2015 AVCA Second-Team All-American
- 2016 Liga de Voleibol Superior Femenino - "Best Opposite"
- 2017 Liga de Voleibol Superior Femenino - "Best Opposite"
- 2017 Liga de Voleibol Superior Femenino - "Most Valuable Player"
- 2019 FIVB Women's Volleyball Nations League – "Best Attacker"
- 2019 FIVB Women's Volleyball Nations League – "Most Valuable Player"
- 2019 FIVB Women's World Cup – "Best Opposite"
- 2019 USA Volleyball - "Female Indoor Player of the Year"
- 2019-2020 Japan Division 1 V.League (V1) - "Best Server"
- 2019-2020 Japan Division 1 V.League (V1) - "Best Opposite"
- 2019-2020 Japan Division 1 V.League (V1) - "Most Valuable Player"
- 2020 Empress's Cup All Japan Volleyball Championship - "Most Valuable Player"
- 2020-2021 Japan Division 1 V.League (V1) - "Best Opposite"
- 2021-2022 Japan Division 1 V.League (V1) - "Best Opposite"
- 2021-2022 Japan Division 1 V.League (V1) - "Fighting Spirit Award"

=== Clubs ===
==== National championships ====
- Liga de Voleibol Superior Femenino
  - 2015-2016 runner-up, with Indias de Mayagüez
  - 2016-2017 Champion, with Criollas de Caguaso
- Japan Division 1 V.League (V1)
  - 2019-2020 Star Conference Champion, with JT Marvelous
  - 2019-2020 Final Stage Champion, with JT Marvelous
  - 2020-2021 Final Stage Champion, with JT Marvelous
  - 2021-2022 Season Champion, with JT Marvelous
  - 2021-2022 Final Stage runner-up, with JT Marvelous
- Empress's Cup All Japan Volleyball Championship
  - 2020 Champion, with JT Marvelous
  - 2021 runner-up, with JT Marvelous

=== Notable recognitions ===
On April 7, 2020, Fédération Internationale de Volleyball recognized Drews as the FIVB Player of the Week following a series of features of the world's elite volleyball players. She followed week 1 awardee Yuji Nishida.

Awards and achievements
| Preceded by (United States) Michelle Bartsch-Hackley | Most Valuable Player of FIVB Volleyball Women's Nations League; 2019 | Succeeded by (United States) Michelle Bartsch-Hackley |
| Preceded by (Russia) Nataliya Goncharova | Best Opposite of FIVB Volleyball Women's World Cup; 2019 | Succeeded by TBD |
| Preceded by (United States) Foluke Akinradewo | Most Valuable Player of Japan Division 1 V.League (V1); 2019-2020 | Succeeded by (Japan) Mako Kobata |
| Preceded by (Japan) Risa Shinnabe | Best Opposite of Japan Division 1 V.League (V1); 2019-2020, 2020-2021, 2021-2022 | Succeeded by TBD |
| Preceded by (Azerbaijan) Jana Kulan | Best Server of Japan Division 1 V.League (V1); 2019-2020 | Succeeded by Misaki Yamauchi |
| Preceded by (United States) Foluke Akinradewo | Most Valuable Player of Emperor's Cup and Empress's Cup All Japan Volleyball Championship; 2020 | Succeeded by (Japan) Arisa Inoue |
| Preceded by (United States) Foluke Akinradewo (United States) Kelsey Robinson | Female Indoor Volleyball Player of the Year of United States women's national volleyball team 2019 | Succeeded by None named |
| Preceded by (Puerto Rico) Stephanie Enright | Most Valuable Player of Liga de Voleibol Superior Femenino; 2016 | Succeeded by (Puerto Rico) Stephanie Enright |
