= Michael Ojo (basketball, born 1989) =

Nigerian-American basketball player

Personal information
- Born: June 28, 1989 (age 37) Santa Monica, California
- Listed height: 1.95 m (6 ft 5 in)
- Listed weight: 91 kg (201 lb)

Career information
- High school: Crossroads School (Santa Monica, California)
- College: Lehigh (2007–2011)
- Playing career: 2011–2021
- Position: Point guard / shooting guard

Career history
- 2011–2013: Plymouth Raiders
- 2013–2014: Apollon Limassol
- 2014–2015: Eco Örebro
- 2015: Apollon Patras
- 2015–2016: Sigma Barcellona
- 2016: mmcité Brno
- 2016–2017: Klosterneuburg Dukes
- 2017: Allianz Swans Gmunden
- 2018: Worcester Wolves
- 2019: Tindastóll
- 2019: BPC Virtus Cassino
- 2020–2021: Veltex Shizuoka

Michael Adetokunbo Ojo (born June 28, 1989) is a Nigerian-American former basketball player. He played college basketball for the Lehigh Mountain Hawks before playing professionally in Europe.

== Professional career ==
In 2011, Ojo signed with the Plymouth Raiders of the British Basketball League and played there for two seasons. He helped the team make it to the BBL Cup and Trophy finals and in his final season, he averaged 22.5 points per game.

Later, Ojo played professionally in several European leagues, including with Apollon Limassol in Cyprus, Eco Örebro in Sweden, Apollon PATRAS in Greece, Sigma Barcellona in Italy, mmcité Brno in the Czech Republic, and Austrian clubs Klosterneuburg Dukes and Allianz Swans Gmunden.

On January 3, 2018, Ojo signed for the Worcester Wolves. In 21 games, he averaged 11.9 points and 3.0 assists while shooting 41.7% from the three point line. He helped the club to the BBL Cup Final on January 28, 2018, where he scored a team-high 18 points in the Wolves 88–99 loss to the Cheshire Phoenix.

On January 25, 2019, Ojo signed with Tindastóll of the Icelandic Úrvalsdeild karla. He appeared in 3 games for the team, averaging 11.7 points per game, before being released on 8 February.

On 3 March 2019, Ojo signed with BPC Virtus Cassino of the Italian Serie A2.

== Nigerian national team ==
In February 2018, Ojo was invited by the senior national team head coach Alexander Nwora to represent Nigeria in the 2019 World Cup qualifications. He made his debut for the senior national team on 24 February 2018, in a game against Rwanda.
