= Veltex Shizuoka =

- Division: Second
- Leagues: B.League
- Founded: 2018
- Arena: Shizuoka City Central Gymnasium
- Location: Shizuoka, Shizuoka
- CEO: Kota Matsunaga
- General manager: Kota Matsunaga
- Head coach: Takahiro Mori
- Website: veltex.co.jp
Home	Away

The Veltex Shizuoka (ベルテックス静岡, Berutekksu Shizuoka) are a Japanese professional basketball team based in Shizuoka. The Veltex compete in the B.League One, the second division of the B.League, as a member of the Western Conference.

== Coaches ==
- Shota Goto
- Rasheed Hazzard
- Facundo Müller

== Roster ==
Veltex Shizuoka roster
Players
Coaches

Pos.	No.	Nat.	Name
PG	0	(Japan)	Atomu Yamada
PG	1	(Japan)	Shinnosuke Oishi
PG	3	(Japan)	Yuzo Okada (C)
SG	4	(Indonesia)	Abraham Damar Grahita
SG	6	(Japan)	Ryutaro Otomo
SF	7	(Argentina)	Alexis Elsener
SG	8	(Japan)	Keita Shinkawa
SF	10	(Japan)	Taiga Jack Komamizu
SG	12	(Japan)	Yohei Fukuda
PF	13	(Republic of the Congo)	Kubema Joseph Steve
PF	17	(The Bahamas)	Tavario Miller
PG	18	(Japan)	Haruki Yamamoto
PF	21	(United States)	John Harrar
PF	24	(Mali)	Tahirou Diabate
C	25	(Ecuador)	Kenny Lawson
PG	33	(Japan)	Haruto Kitahori
PG	37	(Japan)	Kentaro Yoshida
SF	41	(Japan)	Seiya Kano
PF	70	(New Zealand)	Finn Delany
PF	92	(Japan)	Keisuke Murakoshi

Head coach

Facundo Müller

Assistant coach(es)

Revidatti Gabriel

Legend

- (C) Team captain
- Injured

- Roster
Updated: 29 March 2023

Note: Flags indicate national team eligibility at FIBA-sanctioned events. Players may hold other non-FIBA nationalities not displayed.

== Notable players ==
- Muusa Dama
- Luke Evans (fr)
- Novar Gadson
- Michael Ojo
- Reginald Warren
- Abraham Damar Grahita
- Tavario Miller

== Arenas ==
- Shizuoka City Central Gymnasium
- Konohana Arena
- Inasa General Gymnasium
- Shizuoka City Hokubu Gymnasium
- Shizuoka Prefecture Budokan
- Shimizu General Sports Park Gymnasium
- Gotenba City Gymnasium
- Fujikawa Gymnasium
- Sawayaka Arena Fukuroi Gymnasium
