= Facundo Müller =

Argentine basketball coach (born 1973)

Mineros de Zacatecas
- Position: Head coach
- League: LNBP

Personal information
- Born: 9 September 1973 (age 53) Paraná, Argentina
- Coaching career: 2007–present

Career history

Coaching
- 2007–2008: Club Sportivo Ben Hur
- 2013–2015: Ciclista Olímpico
- 2015–2017: Libertad de Sunchales
- 2017–2019: Instituto
- 2019–2020: San Lorenzo
- 2020: Team Cali
- 2021–2024: Veltex Shizuoka
- 2025–: Mineros de Zacatecas

Facundo Müller (born 9 September 1973) is an Argentine basketball coach. He is the head coach of the Mineros de Zacatecas.

== Coaching career ==
Müller started his coaching career in Argentina with Club Sportivo Ben Hur in 2007. In 2017 he joined Instituto. On 2019, he signed with San Lorenzo. In 2021, he coached for the first time in Japan signing with Veltex Shizuoka. In 2025, Müller signed with the Mineros de Zacatecas of the LNBP.
