= Shizuoka City Central Gymnasium =

Arena in Shizuoka, Japan

Coordinates: 34°58′54.1″N 138°23′6.1″E

Shizuoka City Central Gymnasium 静岡市中央体育館
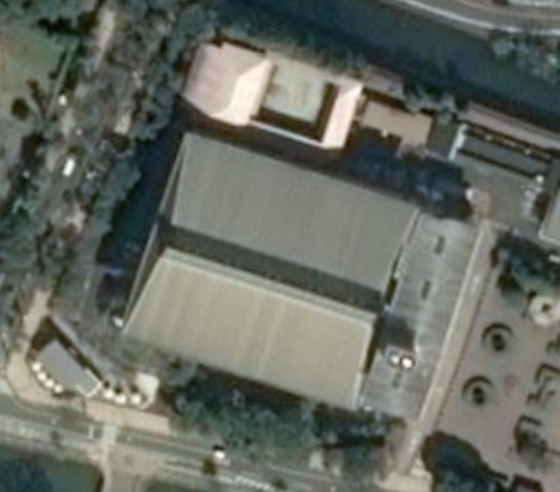
- Interactive map of Shizuoka City Central Gymnasium 静岡市中央体育館
- Full name: Shizuoka City Central Gymnasium
- Location: Shizuoka, Shizuoka, Japan
- Owner: Shizuoka City
- Operator: Shizuoka City Sports Association
- Capacity: 984

Construction
- Cost

Tenant
- Veltex Shizuoka

Website
- HP

Shizuoka City Central Gymnasium is an arena in Shizuoka, Shizuoka, Japan. It is the home arena of the Veltex Shizuoka of the B.League, Japan's professional basketball league.

== Facilities ==
- Main arena - 61.0m x 40.0m
