= Aimi Kawashima =

Japanese volleyball player (born 1990)

Personal information
- Nationality: Japanese
- Born: 15 April 1990 (age 36); Anpachi, Gifu, Japan
- Height: 181 cm (71 in)
- Weight: 67 kg (148 lb)
- Spike: 299 cm (118 in)
- Block: 275 cm (108 in)

Volleyball information
- Number: 20 (national team)

Career
Years	Teams
2013	Okayama Seagulls

National team
2013	Japan

Aimi Kawashima (川島 亜依美, Kawashima Aima; born 15 April 1990) is a Japanese female volleyball player. She was part of the Japan women's national volleyball team.

She competed at the 2013 FIVB Volleyball World Grand Prix. On club level she played for Okayama Seagulls in 2013.
