= Muko Citizens Gymnasium =

Arena in Muko, Kyoto, Japan

Coordinates: 34°56′46″N 135°42′46.2″E

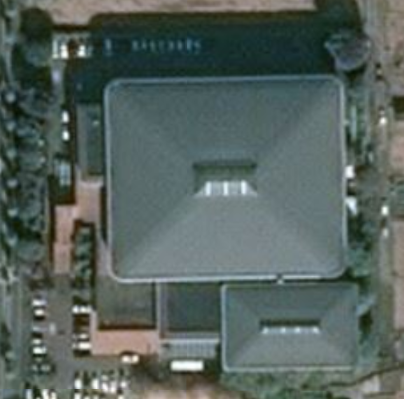
- Interactive map of Muko Citizens Gymnasium
- Full name: Muko Citizens Gymnasium
- Location: Muko, Kyoto, Japan
- Owner: Muko city
- Operator: Muko city

Construction
- Cost

Website
- http://www.mukosca.server-shared.com/contents11.html

Muko Citizens Gymnasium is an arena in Muko, Kyoto, Japan.

== Facilities ==
- Large gymnasium
- Small gymnasium
- Conference rooms
- Training room
