= Arisa Inoue =

Japanese volleyball player (born 1995)

Personal information
- Full name: Arisa Inoue
- Nickname: Arisa
- Born: 8 May 1995 (age 31) Maizuru, Kyoto, Japan
- Height: 1.78 m (5 ft 10 in)
- Weight: 65 kg (143 lb)
- Spike: 303 cm (119 in)
- Block: 287 cm (113 in)

Volleyball information
- Position: Outside hitter
- Current club: victorina Himeji
- Number: 10(National)

National team
- Years: Team
- –: Japan
Medal record
Women's volleyball
Representing Japan
FIVB Nations League
Silver medal – second place	2024 Bangkok	Team

Arisa Inoue (井上 愛里沙, Inoue Arisa; born 8 May 1995) is a Japanese volleyball player who plays for the Hisamitsu Springs. She also plays for the Japan women's national volleyball team.

Inoue won a silver medal with the Japan U20 national team at the 2013 FIVB Women's Junior World Championship. She also competed at the 2014 Montreux Volley Masters, 2022 FIVB Volleyball Women's Nations League, 2022 FIVB Volleyball Women's World Championship with the Japan women's national volleyball team.

Inoue won the Most Valuable Player award of 2021–22 V.League Division 1. Hisamitsu Springs were also the tournament champions.

For the 2022-2023 season, Inoue joined Saint-Raphaël Var Volleyball team to compete in French Ligue A.

== Clubs ==
- Maizuru Yoichi primary school volleyball club
- Shūjitu junior highschool
- Kyoto Prefectural Nishi-Maizuru highschool
- University of Tsukuba (2014-2018)
- Hisamitsu Springs (2018-2022)
- Saint-Raphaël Var Volley-Ball (2022-2023)
- Victorina Himeji (2023-)

== Awards ==
=== Individual ===
- 2009 - Junior highschool championship (prefectural)- JVA/JOC Cup (Excellent Player Award)
- 2013 - Kyoto Prefectural Sports Award
- 2024 - MVP Emperor's Cup and Empress' Cup All Japan Volleyball Championship

=== Team ===
- 2013 FIVB Women's Junior World Championship silver medal

== National team ==
- Junior Team - 2013
- Senior Team - 2014-present
- U~23 pH -2015
