= USA Volleyball Cup =

- Sport: Indoor volleyball
- First season: 2013
- CEO: Doug Beal
- Confederation: NORCECA
- Website: www.teamusa.org/USA-Volleyball

The USA Volleyball Cup or USAV Cup is an annual indoor volleyball event organized by USA Volleyball. The USAV CUP is an initiative of the USA Volleyball that draw elite teams to the United States to compete with the U.S. Men's and Women's National Indoor Volleyball Teams.

This provides the chance for the local communities around the U.S. specially to the host city of USA Volleyball, Anaheim, to watch world-class competition of women's volleyball.

In every tour series, at least one match will be played in Southern California and one throughout the country.

The USA Volleyball Cup was inaugurated in 2013 with the U.S. Women's National Team hosting Japan's Women's National Team.

The following year, the U.S. Men's National Team started the men's tour of USAV Cup hosting Iran's Men's National Team.

== 2013 ==
The inaugural year of USA Volleyball Cup only had the women's series. Japan's women's volleyball team accepted the U.S. invitation. The event served as a preparation to the 2013 FIVB World Grand Prix.

Prior to this tour series, the U.S. Women's National Team hosted Japan during the spring of 2000 with matches in Burleston, Texas, Pueblo, Colorado, Colorado Spring and Denver.

Japan won three of the four matches with three of the matches extending to a fifth set. In Pueblo, Colo., Japan won the contest with a 25–23 score in the fifth set. The single victory of U.S. also came to a five-set match.

=== U.S. Women vs Japan ===
All matches of the 2013 USA Volleyball Cup took place in Southern California.
Match 1
Venue: RIMAC Arena, UC San Diego, La Jolla, San Diego, CA

Date	Time		Score		Set 1	Set 2	Set 3	Set 4	Set 5	Total	Report
10 July	19:00	USA	3–1	Japan	23–25	25–23	25–22	25–23		98–93	Report

Match 2
Venue: Walter Pyramid, Long Beach State Long Beach, CA

Date	Time		Score		Set 1	Set 2	Set 3	Set 4	Set 5	Total	Report
12 July	19:00	USA	3–1	Japan	25–17	26–24	18–25	25–20		94–86	Report

Match 3
Venue: JSerra Pavilion, JSerra Catholic High School, San Juan Capistrano, CA

Date	Time		Score		Set 1	Set 2	Set 3	Set 4	Set 5	Total	Report
13 July	19:00	USA	3–2	Japan	25–15	25–19	21–25	23–25	15–10	109–94	Report

- USA won the series against Japan, 3–0

== 2014 ==
For this year's USAV Cup, the U.S. women hosted Brazil Women's National Team. In addition to the women's series, the U.S. Men's National Team were introduced to the USAV Cup with the inclusion of men's series.
The U.S. men hosted the I.R. Iran men's national team. This marked the first time the Iran's volleyball team compete on U.S. soil.

The 2014 USAV Cup featured four exhibition games for both men and women. It also served as a preparation for the 2014 FIVB World Championship.

=== U.S. Women vs Brazil ===
Match 1
Venue: Bren Events Center, UC Irvine, Irvine, CA

Date	Time		Score		Set 1	Set 2	Set 3	Set 4	Set 5	Total	Report
5 July	19:00	USA	3–1	Brazil	25–22	25–27	25–19	25–19		100–87	Report

Match 2
Venue: Galen Center, USC, Los Angeles, CA

Date	Time		Score		Set 1	Set 2	Set 3	Set 4	Set 5	Total	Report
6 July	17:00	USA	3–0	Brazil	25–21	25–23	25–20			75–64	Report

Match 3
Venue: Stan Sheriff Center, UH Manoa, Honolulu, HI

Date	Time		Score		Set 1	Set 2	Set 3	Set 4	Set 5	Total	Report
11 July	19:00	USA	3–2	Brazil	25–19	22–25	27–25	25–27	15–11	114–107	Report

Match 4
Venue: Stan Sheriff Center, UH Manoa, Honolulu, HI

Date	Time		Score		Set 1	Set 2	Set 3	Set 4	Set 5	Total	Report
12 July	19:00	USA	3–2	Brazil	22–25	27–25	23–25	25–23	15–11	112–109	Report

- USA swept Brazil, 4–0

=== U.S. Men vs Iran ===
Match 1
Venue: Galen Center, USC, Los Angeles, CA

Date	Time		Score		Set 1	Set 2	Set 3	Set 4	Set 5	Total	Report
9 August	19:00	USA	3–1	Iran	27–25	25–21	27–29	25–17		104–92	Report

Match 2
Venue: Anaheim Convention Center, Anaheim Resort, Anaheim, CA

Date	Time		Score		Set 1	Set 2	Set 3	Set 4	Set 5	Total	Report
13 August	19:00	USA	3–0	Iran	25–23	25–23	25–21			75–67	Report

Match 3
Venue: Viejas Arena, San Diego State, San Diego, CA

Date	Time		Score		Set 1	Set 2	Set 3	Set 4	Set 5	Total	Report
15 August	19:00	USA	2–3	Iran	26–24	24–26	27–25	20–25	9–15	106–115	Report

Match 4
Venue: Bren Events Center, UC Irvine, Irvine, CA

Date	Time		Score		Set 1	Set 2	Set 3	Set 4	Set 5	Total	Report
16 August	18:00	USA	3–0	Iran	25–18	25–22	25–19			75–59	Report

- USA beat Iran, 3–1

== 2015 ==
The 2015 USAV Cup featured China as the visiting team. This series was viewed as the continuation of the 2014 World Championship finals where the same two teams met.

The U.S. Men hosted Brazil for the 2015 USAV Cup. The seven served as a preparation of for the 2015 World Cup.

=== U.S. Women vs China ===
Match 1
Venue: Stan Sheriff Center, UH Manoa, Honolulu, HI

Date	Time		Score		Set 1	Set 2	Set 3	Set 4	Set 5	Total	Report
5 June	19:00	USA	3–0	China	25–22	25–15	25–22			75–59	Report

Match 2
Venue: Stan Sheriff Center, UH Manoa, Honolulu, HI

Date	Time		Score		Set 1	Set 2	Set 3	Set 4	Set 5	Total	Report
6 June	19:00	USA	0–3	China	21–25	23–25	12–25			56–75	Report

Match 3
Venue: Bren Events Center, UC Irvine, Irvine, CA

Date	Time		Score		Set 1	Set 2	Set 3	Set 4	Set 5	Total	Report
9 June	19:00	USA	2–3	China	29–27	21–25	25–19	19–25	15–17	109–113	Report

Match 4
Venue: Coussoulis Arena, Cal State San Bernardino, San Bernardino, CA

Date	Time		Score		Set 1	Set 2	Set 3	Set 4	Set 5	Total	Report
12 June	19:00	USA	3–0	China	25–22	27–25	25–22			77–69	Report

- Series tied at 2–2

=== U.S. Men vs Brazil ===
Match 1
Venue: Walter Pyramid, Long Beach State, Long Beach, CA

Date	Time		Score		Set 1	Set 2	Set 3	Set 4	Set 5	Total	Report
23 Aug	19:00	USA	2–3	Brazil	25–23	23–25	34–36	25–20	13–15	120–119	Report

Match 2
Venue: Jenny Craig Pavilion, University of San Diego, San Diego, CA

Date	Time		Score		Set 1	Set 2	Set 3	Set 4	Set 5	Total	Report
25 Aug	19:00	USA	0–3	Brazil	18–25	22–25	22–25			62–75	Report

Match 3
Venue: Galen Center, USC, Los Angeles, CA

Date	Time		Score		Set 1	Set 2	Set 3	Set 4	Set 5	Total	Report
26 Aug	19:00	USA	3–2	Brazil	24–26	25–22	25–22	21–25	15–11	110–106	Report

Match 4
Venue: Bren Events Center, UC Irvine, Irvine, CA

Date	Time		Score		Set 1	Set 2	Set 3	Set 4	Set 5	Total	Report
29 Aug	19:00	USA	1–3	Brazil	20–25	33–31	18–25	27–29		98–110	

- Brazil beat the event host, 3–1

== 2016 ==
The men's series of this year's USAV Cup was shorter than the previous editions with only two-exhibition games. The U.S. men hosted Japan.

The men's series was scheduled slightly earlier than the previous editions. Some of the leading players of U.S. men's team were still competing abroad making them unable to participate in the event.

The event served as a preparation of Japan for the 2016 World Olympic Qualification.

=== U.S. Men vs Japan ===
Match 1
Venue: Galen Center, USC, Los Angeles, CA

Date	Time		Score		Set 1	Set 2	Set 3	Set 4	Set 5	Total	Report
6 May	19:30	United States	1–3	Japan	23–25	20–25	25–19	20–25		88–94	Report

Match 2
Venue: Walter Pyramid, Long Beach State, Long Beach, CA

Date	Time		Score		Set 1	Set 2	Set 3	Set 4	Set 5	Total	Report
11 May	19:30	United States	3–0	Japan	25–18	25–21	25–21			75–60	Report

- Series tied at 1–1

== 2017 ==
The men's series of this year's USAV Cup was like the previous edition with only two-exhibition games. The U.S. men hosted Brazil.

The event served as a preparation for both teams to the 2017 FIVB Volleyball Men's World Grand Champions Cup.

=== U.S. Men vs Brazil ===
Match 1
Venue: Sears Centre Arena, Hoffman Estates, Illinois.

Date	Time		Score		Set 1	Set 2	Set 3	Set 4	Set 5	Total	Report
18 Aug	19:30	United States	0–3	Brazil	21–25	23–25	27–29			71–79	

Match 2
Venue: Sears Centre Arena, Hoffman Estates, Illinois.

Date	Time		Score		Set 1	Set 2	Set 3	Set 4	Set 5	Total	Report
19 Aug	19:30	United States	2–3	Brazil	25–23	22–25	23–25	25–22	16–18	111–113	

- Brazil won both matches, by 3-0 and 3-2.

=== U.S Women vs Brazil ===
The event serves as a preparation for both teams to the 2017 FIVB Volleyball Women's World Grand Champions Cup.

Match 1
Venue: Anaheim Convention Center, Anaheim, California.

Date	Time		Score		Set 1	Set 2	Set 3	Set 4	Set 5	Total	Report
27 Aug	16:00	United States	–	Brazil	–	–	–			0–0	

Match 2
Venue: Anaheim Convention Center, Anaheim, California.

Date	Time		Score		Set 1	Set 2	Set 3	Set 4	Set 5	Total	Report
29 Aug	19:30	United States	–	Brazil	–	–	–			0–0	

== See also ==
- United States men's national volleyball team
- United States women's national volleyball team
