= Kawagoe Sports Park Athletics Stadium =

Athletics stadium in Kawagoe, Saitama, Japan

Coordinates: 35°55′45″N 139°31′47″E

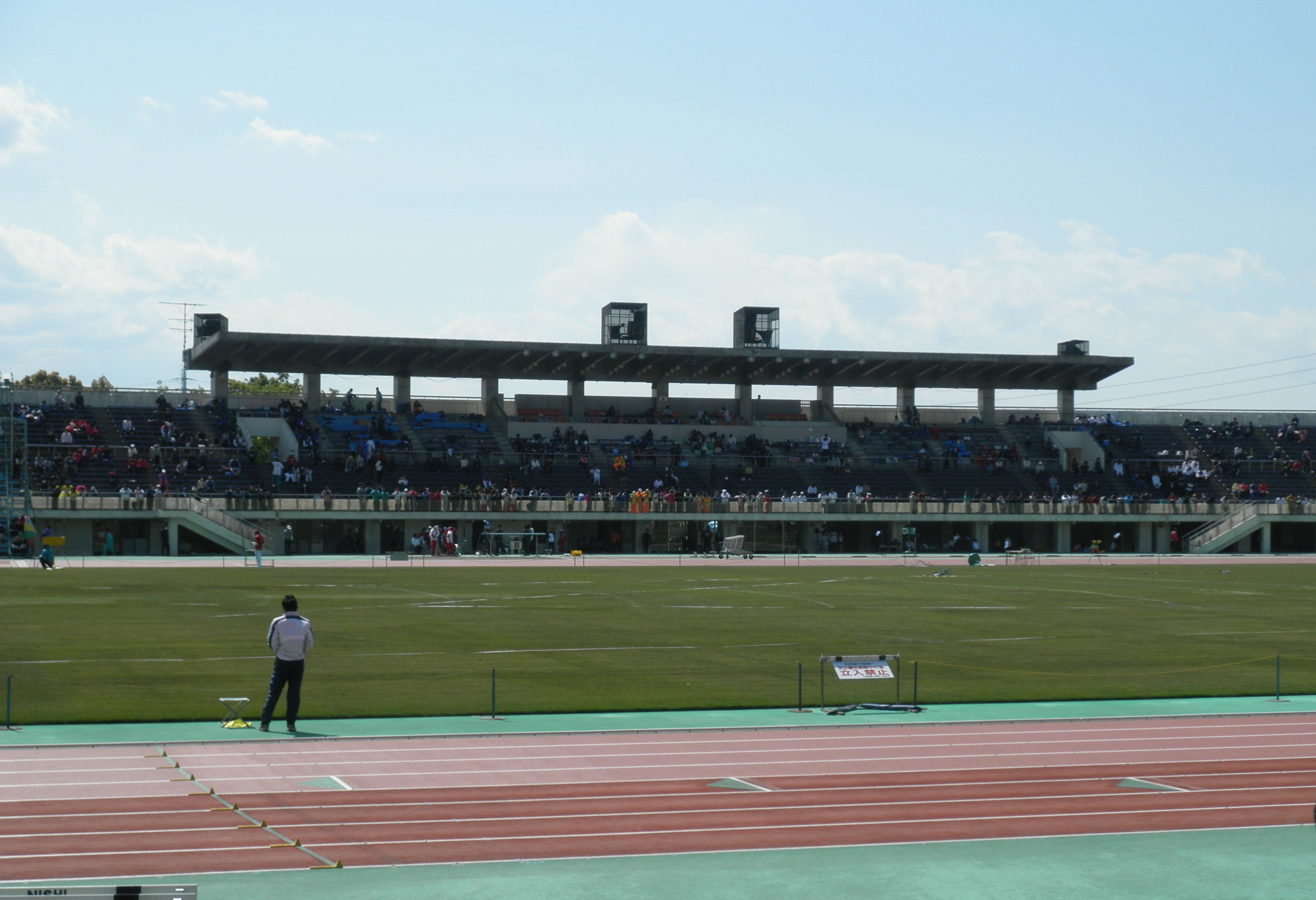
- Interactive map of Kawagoe Sports Park Athletics Stadium
- Location: Kawagoe, Saitama, Japan
- Owner: Kawagoe City
- Capacity: 8,500

Construction
- Opened: 1992

Tenant
- Chifure AS Elfen Saitama

Kawagoe Sports Park Athletics Stadium (川越運動公園陸上競技場) is an athletics stadium in Kawagoe, Saitama, Japan. It is located within the Kawagoe Sports Park, which also includes a general gymnasium, and tennis courts.
