= Kurume Arena =

Indoor arena in Kurume, Fukuoka, Japan

Coordinates: 33°19′17.7″N 130°31′50.9″E

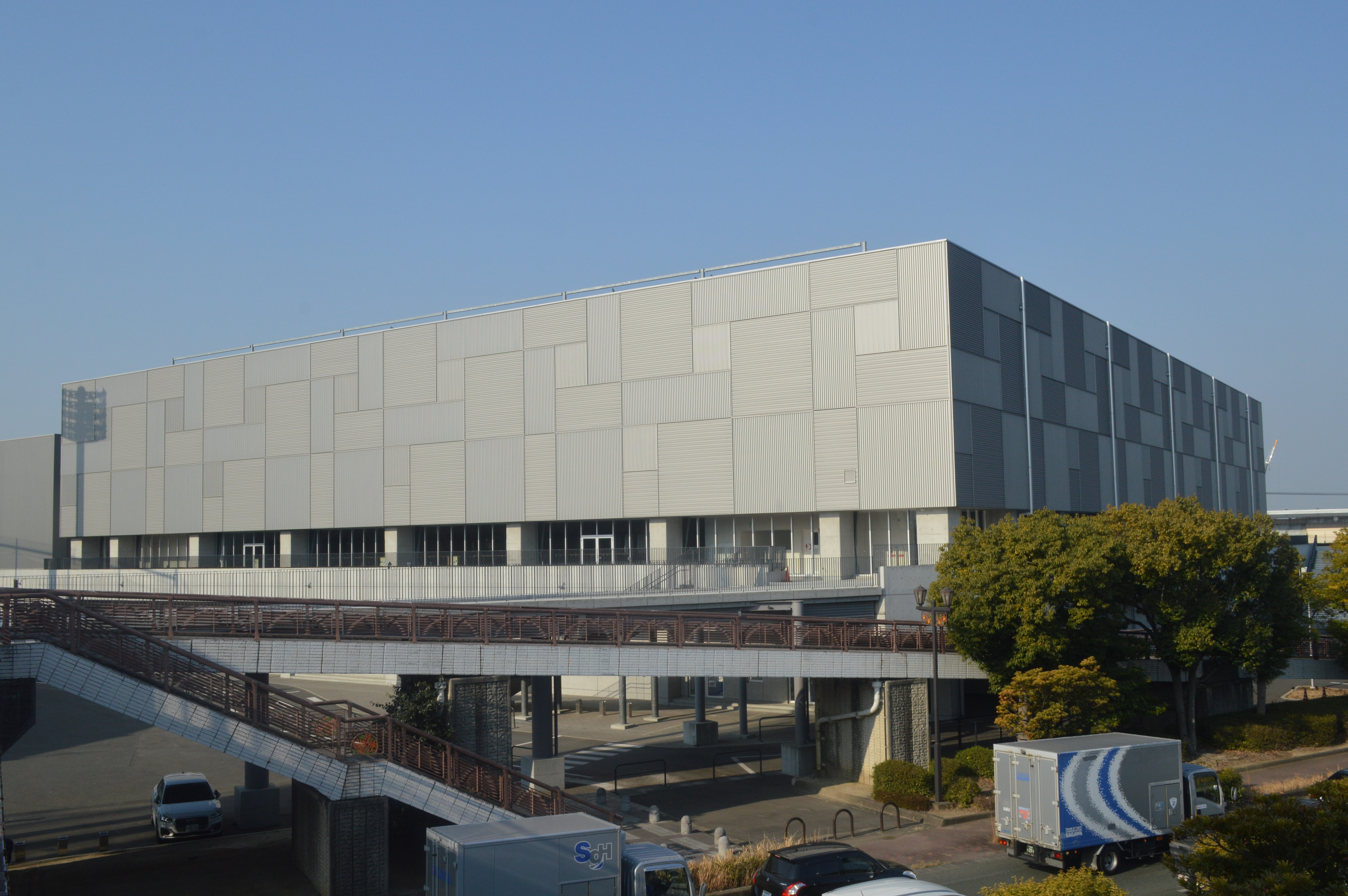
- Interactive map of Kurume Arena
- Full name: Fukuoka Prefectural General Sports Center Gymnasium
- Location: Kurume, Fukuoka, Japan
- Owner: Fukuoka Prefecture
- Operator: Fukuoka Sports Life Creation Partners
- Capacity: 5,000

Construction
- Opened: 2018
- Cost

Website
- https://kurume-sports-center.jp/facility/arena.html

Kurume Arena is an arena in Kurume, Fukuoka, Japan.

== Facilities ==
- Main arena 2,560m^{2}
- Sub arena 782m^{2}
- Training room
- Tatami Budojo
- Floor Budojo
- Archery field

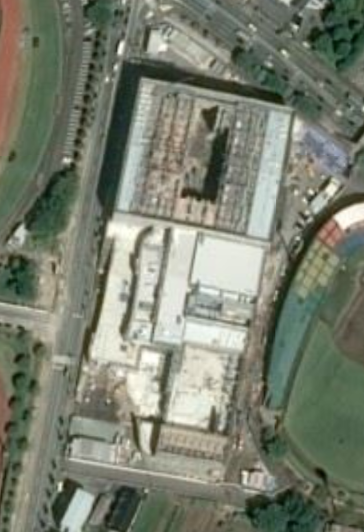
Old Kurume Gymnasium
