= Konohana Arena =

Sports arena in Shizuoka, Japan

Coordinates: 34°59′15.7″N 138°25′42.8″E

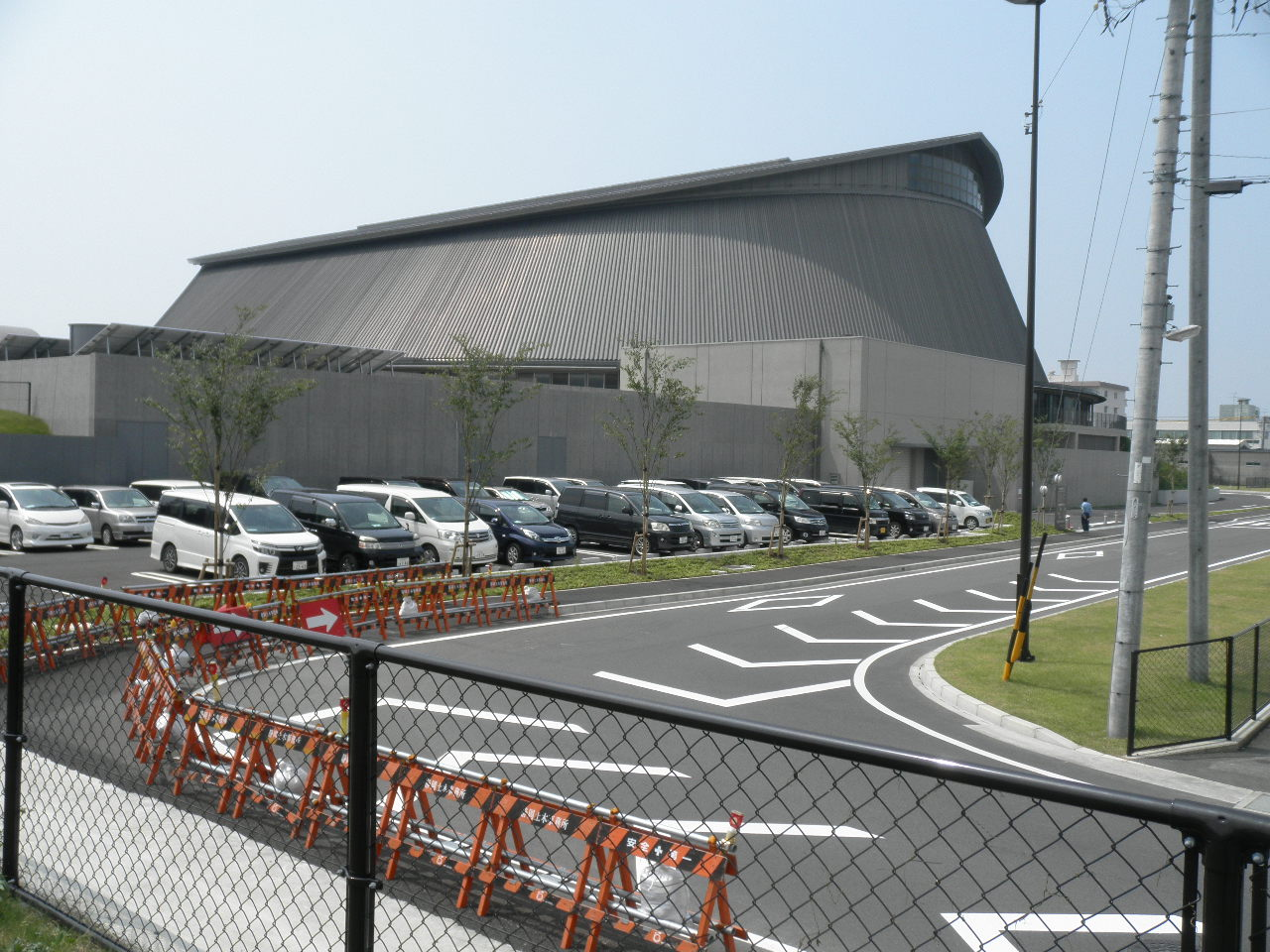
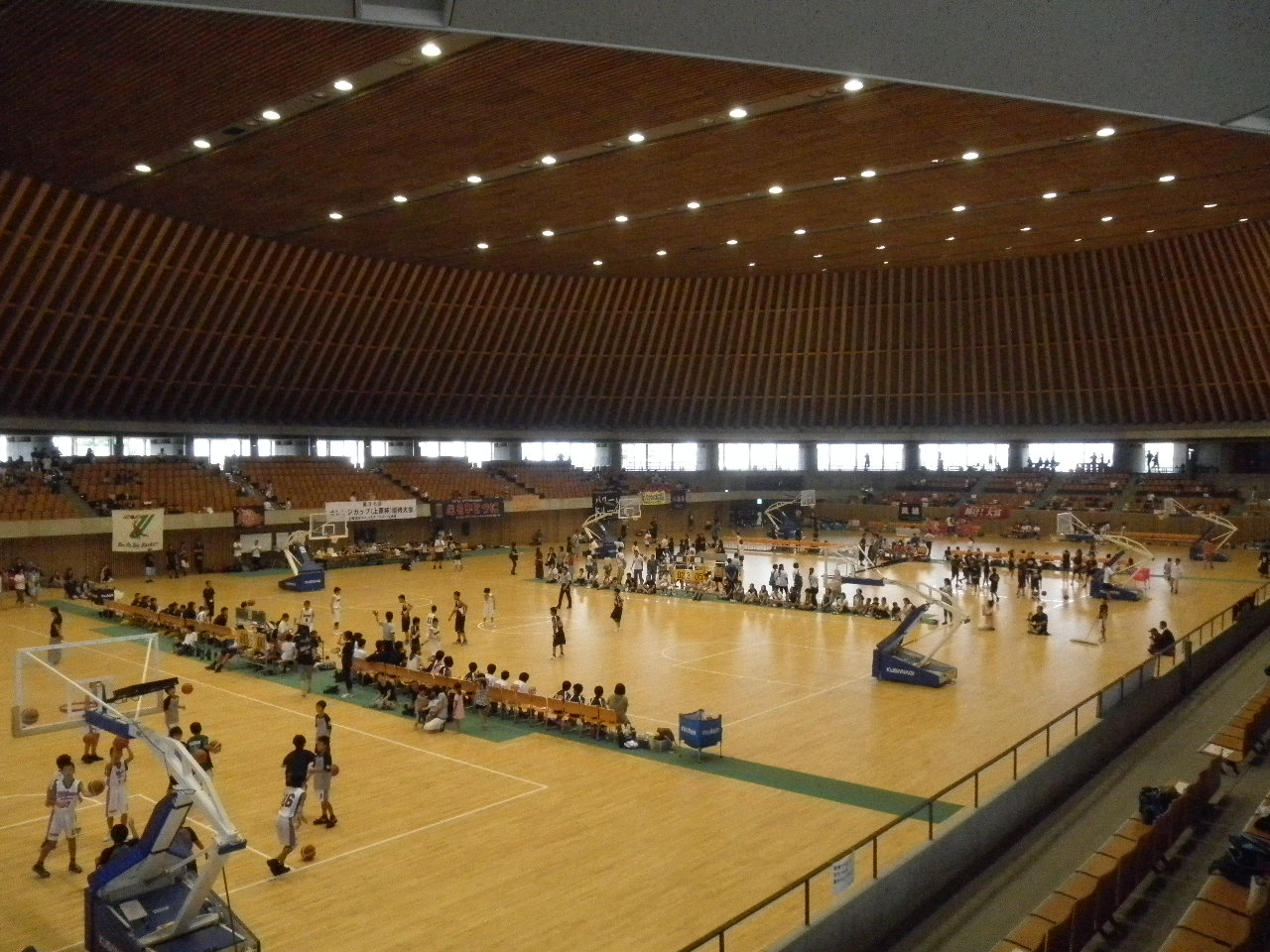
- Interactive map of Konohana Arena
- Full name: Shizuoka Prefectural Kusanagi General Sports Park Gymnasium
- Location: Shizuoka, Shizuoka, Japan
- Owner: Shizuoka Prefecture
- Operator: Shizuoka Prefecture
- Capacity: 4,000

Construction
- Opened: May 2, 2015
- Cost
- Architect: Hiroshi Naito
- Main contractor: Kajima

Tenants
- Veltex Shizuoka; Chanson V-Magic

Website
- HP

Konohana Arena is an arena in Shizuoka, Shizuoka, Japan. It is the home arena of the Veltex Shizuoka of the B.League, Japan's professional basketball league.

== Facilities ==
- Main arena - 3,772m^{2}（82m×46m）

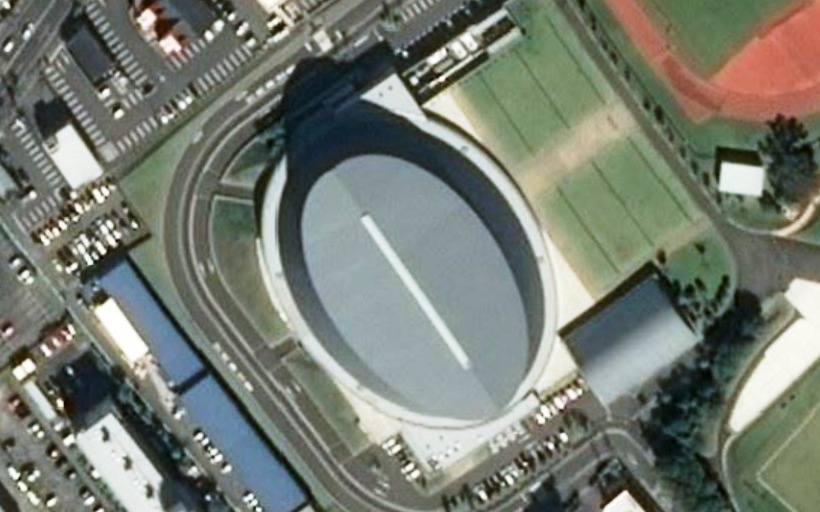
Satellite view
