= Jana Kulan =

Slovak-Azerbaijani volleyball player

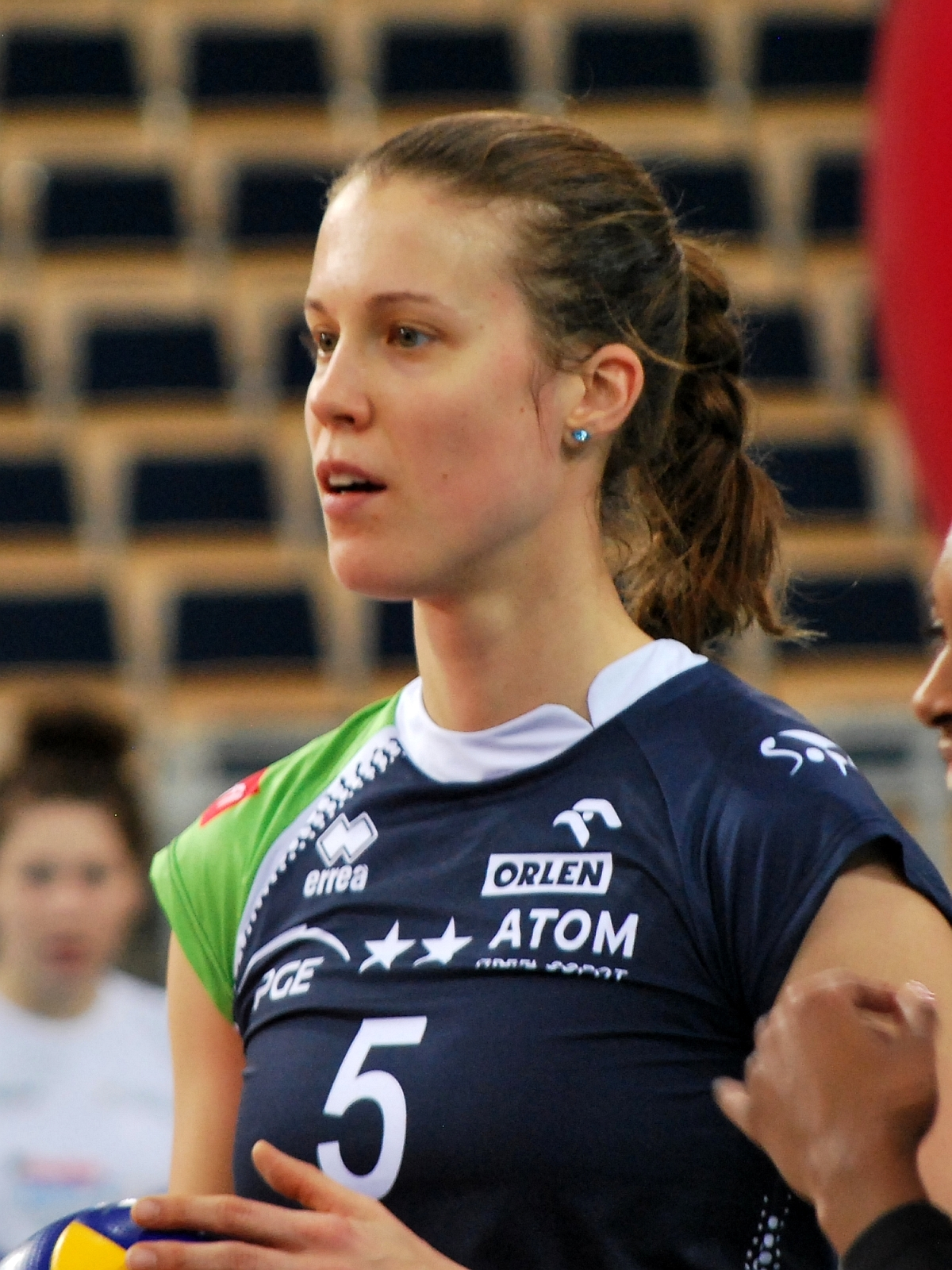
- Kulan in 2014

Personal information
- Nationality: Slovak; Azerbaijani
- Born: Jana Matiasovska; 7 July 1987 (age 39); Bratislava, Slovakia, Czechoslovakia
- Height: 1.98 m (6 ft 6 in)
- Weight: 83.5 kg (184 lb)
- Spike: 318 cm (125 in)
- Block: 302 cm (119 in)

Coaching information
- Current team: India
Previous teams coached
Years	Teams
2026–	India

Volleyball information
- Position: Outside-spiker

Career
Years	Teams
2023–2024	Nilüfer Belediyespor

National team
2005–2010	Slovakia
2013–2018	Azerbaijan

Jana Kulan (née Matiasovska-Aghayeva; born 7 July 1987) is a Slovak-Azerbaijani volleyball coach and former player, who serves as the head coach of the India national team. She has represented the Slovakia and the Azerbaijan national team.

On 10 May 2026, Kulan was appointed the head coach of the India women's national volleyball team.
