= Mako Kobata =

Japanese volleyball player (born 1992)

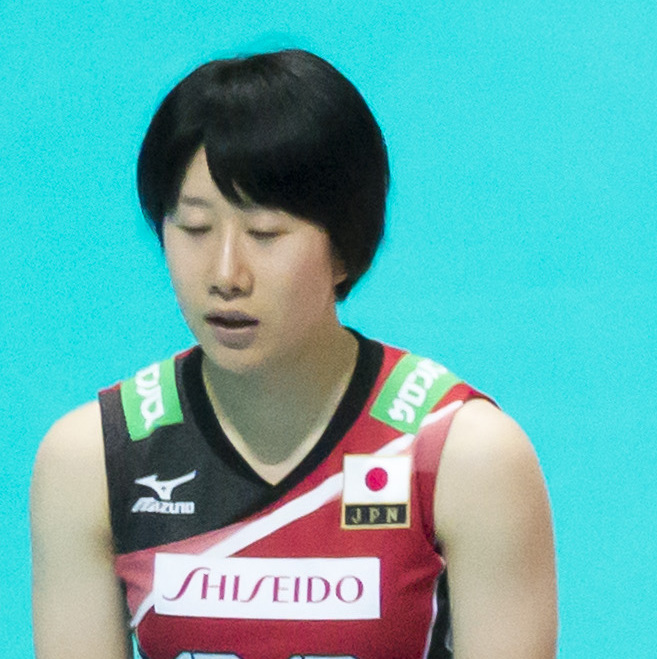

Personal information
- Born: August 15, 1992 (age 33) Kami-Amakusa, Kumamoto, Japan

Sport
- Sport: Volleyball

Mako Kobata (born August 15, 1992) is a Japanese professional volleyball player. She plays the libero position and is known for her fast reactions and strong defense. Kobata has played for the Japan women's national volleyball team and participated in several international tournaments, including the Tokyo 2020 Olympics. She also plays for Hisamitsu Springs, a top team in Japan's V.League.

== Early life ==
Mako Kobata was born in Japan on August 15, 1992, in Kami-Amakusa, Kumamoto. She became interested in volleyball at a young age. Although liberos are not usually in the spotlight, Kobata enjoyed defense and focused on becoming strong in that position. Before beginning her official career, she played for her high school team at Kyushu Bunka.

== Career ==
Kobata's professional career began in the Japanese V.League, where she joined Hisamitsu Springs. As a libero, her job is to play in the back row, receive serves, and dig attacks from the other team. Kobata quickly became one of the most reliable defensive players in the league. As pat of Hisamitsu Springs, she won the V.League and the Empress's Cup. She also played for JT Marvelous.

In 2019, she was selected for the Japan women's national volleyball team and played in the FIVB Volleyball Women's World Cup. She was also a member of the national team for the 2020 Tokyo Olympics. At the Olympics, Kobata was noted for her energetic and enthusiastic playing style.
