= 2019–20 V.League Division 1 Women's =

- League: V.League Division 1
- Sport: Volleyball
- Duration: Oct 12, 2019 – Jan 26, 2020
- Games: 126 (Regular round); 16 (Final stage)
- Teams: 12

2019–2020
- Season champions: JT Marvelous, Denso Airybees
- Top scorer: Neriman Özsoy
- Finals champions: JT Marvelous
- Runners-up: Okayama Seagulls
- Finals MVP: Andrea Drews

Women's V.League Division 1 seasons
- 2018-19 2020-21

The Volleyball 2019–20 V.League Division 1 Women's was the 26th tournament year and the 2nd top level women's tournament of the newly branded and reorganized V.League (Japan). It was held from October 12, 2019 – January 26, 2020.

== Clubs ==
Locations of the 2019–20 V.League Division 1 Women's clubs

=== Personnel ===
2019–20 V.League Division 1 Women's Personnel
Club	Head coach	Captain	City, Prefecture	Colors	Main Sponsor
Denso Airybees	(Japan) Yuan Kawakita	(Japan) Yurie Nabeya	Nishio, Aichi		Denso
Himeji Victorina	(Japan) Yoshie Takeshita	(Japan) Sakie Takahashi	Himeji, Hyōgo		Himeji Victorina Co., Ltd.
Hisamitsu Springs	(Japan) Shingo Sakai	(Japan) Yuki Ishii	Tosu, Saga		Hisamitsu Pharmaceutical
Hitachi Rivale	(Japan) Asako Tajimi	(Japan) Maiha Haga	Hitachinaka, Ibaraki		Hitachi Automotive Systems
JT Marvelous	(Japan) Tomoko Yoshihara	(Japan) Mako Kobata	Osaka, Hyogo		Japan Tobacco Ltd.
Kurobe AquaFairies	(Japan) Takaya Maruyama	(Japan) Saki Maruyama	Kurobe, Toyama		Kurobe Corporation
NEC Red Rockets	(Japan) Kaneko Takayuki	(Japan) Misaki Yamauchi	Kawasaki, Kanagawa		NEC
Okayama Seagulls	(Japan) Akiyoshi Kawamoto	(Japan) Mizuki Ugajin	Okayama		Okayama Corporation
PFU BlueCats	(Japan) Masayasu Sakamoto	(Japan) Saori Uda	Kanazawa, Ishikawa		PFU Corporation
Saitama Ageo Medics	(Japan) Toshiaki Yoshida	(Japan) Misaki Inoue	Ageo, Saitama		Ageo Medical Group
Toray Arrows	(Japan) Koichiro Kanno	(Japan) Mari Horikawa	Ōtsu, Shiga		Toray Industries
Toyota Auto Body Queenseis	(Japan) Haruya Indo	(Japan) Marina Shichi	Kariya, Aichi		Toyota Auto Body

=== Conferences ===
The 2019-20 V.League Division 1 Women will be divided into two conferences of six teams each: Premier and Star.

V.League Division 1 Women's 2019-20
Premier Conference	Star Conference
Hisamitsu Springs (V1 / Champions 2019)	Toray Arrows (V1 / 2nd place 2019)
Denso Airybees (V1 / 5th place 2019)	JT Marvelous (V1 / 3rd place 2019)
NEC Red Rockets (V1 / 6th place 2019)	Toyota Auto Body Queenseis (V1 / 4th place 2019)
Hitachi Rivale (V1 / 8th place 2019)	Saitama Ageo Medics (V1 / 7th place 2019)
Okayama Seagulls (V1 / 9th place 2019)	Kurobe AquaFairies (V1 / 10th place 2019)
Himeji Victorina (V2 / Champions 2019)	PFU BlueCats (V1 / 11th place 2019)

=== Foreign players ===
The total number of foreign players is restricted to one per club world wide, and one per club from ASEAN nations.

V.League Division 1 Women's foreign players 2019-20
Team	World	ASEAN
Saitama Ageo Medics	(Croatia) Katarina Barun (CEV)	(Philippines) Jaja Santiago (AVC)
Denso Airybees	(Trinidad and Tobago) Sinead Jack (NORCECA)	(Vietnam) Tran Thi Thanh Thuy (AVC)
Himeji Victorina	(Brazil) Ivna Colombo (CSV)	—N/a
Hisamitsu Springs	(Brazil) Fabiana Claudino (CSV)	—N/a
Hitachi Rivale	(United States) Hannah Tapp (NORCECA)	—N/a
JT Marvelous	(United States) Andrea Drews (NORCECA)	(Thailand) Kaewkalaya Kamulthala (AVC)
Kurobe AquaFairies	(United States) Simone Lee (NORCECA)	(Philippines) Aleona Denise Santiago Manabat
NEC Red Rockets	(Poland) Berenika Tomsia (CEV)	—N/a
Okayama Seagulls	—N/a	—N/a
PFU BlueCats	(United States) Jennifer Doris (NORCECA)	(Thailand) Thanacha Sooksod (AVC)
Toray Arrows	(Azerbaijan) Jana Kulan (CEV)	—N/a
Toyota Auto Body Queenseis	(Turkey) Neriman Özsoy (CEV)	—N/a

=== Transfer players ===
Player	Moving from	Moving to
(Japan) Mai Okumura	(Thailand) Nakhon Ratchasima	(Japan) Denso Airybees
(Japan) Kotoe Inoue	(Romania) CSM București	(Japan) Denso Airybees
(Japan) Kanami Tashiro	(Romania) CSM București	(Japan) Denso Airybees
(Japan) Nanaka Sakamoto	(Germany) SSC Palmberg Schwerin	(Japan) Denso Airybees
(Vietnam) Tran Thi Thanh Thuy	(Vietnam) VTV Bình Điền Long An	(Japan) Denso Airybees
(Japan) Fumika Moriya	(Japan) Hisamitsu Springs	(Japan) Denso Airybees
(Japan) Miki Sakurai	(Japan) Nippon Sport Science University	(Japan) Himeji Victorina
(Japan) Nao Horigome	(Japan) Ryukoku University	(Japan) Himeji Victorina
(Japan) Riho Sadakane	(Japan) Tokai University	(Japan) Himeji Victorina
(Japan) Saki Tanaka	(Japan) Chukyo University	(Japan) Himeji Victorina
(Japan) Arisa Nagano	(Japan) Shoin University	(Japan) Himeji Victorina
(Japan) Mirei Wakita	(Japan) Osaka University of Health and Sport Sciences	(Japan) Himeji Victorina
(Japan) Haruka Kojima	(Japan) Osaka University of Health and Sport Sciences	(Japan) Himeji Victorina
(Japan) Mutsumi Yasuda	(Japan) NIFS	(Japan) Himeji Victorina
(Brazil) Ivna Colombo	(Brazil) Vôlei Balneário Camboriú	(Japan) Himeji Victorina
(Japan) Miyu Nagaoka	(Italy) Imoco Volley Conegliano	(Japan) Hisamitsu Springs
(Japan) Shion Hirayama	(Japan) Higashi Kyushu Ryukoku High School (ja)	(Japan) Hisamitsu Springs
(Brazil) Fabiana Claudino	(Brazil) Dentil/Praia Clube	(Japan) Hisamitsu Springs
(United States) Foluke Akinradewo	(Japan) Hisamitsu Springs	N/A
(United States) Hannah Tapp	(Italy) Zanetti Bergamo	(Japan) Hitachi Rivale
(Japan) Asato Nakamura	(Japan) Kokushikan University	(Japan) Hitachi Rivale
(Belgium) Laura Heyrman	(Japan) Hitachi Rivale	(Italy) Saugella Team Monza
(Japan) Yuki Nishikawa	(Japan) Kinrankai High School (ja)	(Japan) JT Marvelous
(Japan) Aki Momii	(Japan) Hachioji-jissen High School (ja)	(Japan) JT Marvelous
(Japan) Tomoyo Fukagaya	(Japan) Tokai University	(Japan) JT Marvelous
(United States) Andrea Drews	(Turkey) Beylikduzu Voleybol Ihtisas Istanbul	(Japan) JT Marvelous
(Japan) Sakura Kanda	(Japan) Shujitsu High School (ja)	(Japan) JT Marvelous
(Serbia) Brankica Mihajlovic	(Japan) JT Marvelous	(Turkey) Fenerbahçe
(Japan) Wakaba Sugihara	(Japan) Toray Arrows	(Japan) Kurobe AquaFairies
(Japan) Kaori Mabashi	(Japan) Hitachi Rivale	(Japan) Kurobe AquaFairies
(Philippines) Aleona Denise Santiago-Manabat	(Japan) Toray Arrows	(Japan) Kurobe AquaFairies
(Japan) Yuri Umezu	(Japan) Higashi Kyushu Ryukoku High School (ja)	(Japan) Kurobe AquaFairies
(Japan) Ranna Shiraiwa	(Japan) Niigata University of Health and Welfare	(Japan) Kurobe AquaFairies
(United States) Simone Lee	(Turkey) Beylikduzu Voleybol Ihtisas Istanbul	(Japan) Kurobe AquaFairies
(Belgium) Freya Aelbrecht	(Japan) Kurobe AquaFairies	(Turkey) Türk Hava Yolları SK
(Japan) Haruna Soga	(Japan) Kinrankai High School (ja)	(Japan) NEC Red Rockets
(Japan) Chinami Furuya	(Japan) Shoin University	(Japan) NEC Red Rockets
(Japan) Mio Sato	(Japan) Toyota Auto Body Queenseis	(Japan) NEC Red Rockets
(Japan) Ayumi Yoshida	(Japan) Furukawa Gakuen High School (ja)	(Japan) NEC Red Rockets
(Japan) Yuka Sawada	(Japan) Tohoku Fukushi University	(Japan) NEC Red Rockets
(Poland) Berenika Tomsia	(South Korea) Incheon Heungkuk Life Pink Spiders	(Japan) NEC Red Rockets
(United States) Rhamat Alhassan	(Japan) NEC Red Rockets	(Italy) VolAlto Caserta
(Japan) Aoi An Furikawa	(Japan) Miura Gakuen High School	(Japan) Okayama Seagulls
(Japan) Mayu Oikawa	(Japan) Aoyama Gakuin University	(Japan) Okayama Seagulls
(Japan) Mami Miyashita	(Sweden) Svedala VBK	(Japan) Okayama Seagulls
(Japan) Sayaka Tsutsui	(Japan) Hisamitsu Springs	(Japan) PFU BlueCats
(Japan) Nanami Wasai	(Japan) Kurobe AquaFairies	(Japan) PFU BlueCats
(Thailand) Thanacha Sooksod	(Thailand) Supreme Chonburi	(Japan) PFU BlueCats
(Japan) Kanon Sonoda	(Japan) Higashi Kyushu Ryukoku High School (ja)	(Japan) PFU BlueCats
(Japan) Saki Goya	(Japan) Higashi Kyushu Ryukoku High School (ja)	(Japan) PFU BlueCats
(Thailand) Chatchu-on Moksri	(Japan) PFU BlueCats	(Thailand) Nakhon Ratchasima
(Japan) Koyomi Tominaga	(Italy) Lardini Filottrano	(Japan) Saitama Ageo Medics
(Japan) Rena Mizusugi	(Japan) Kinrankai High School (ja)	(Japan) Toray Arrows
(Japan) Mayu Ishikawa	(Japan) Shimokitazawa Seitoku (ja)	(Japan) Toray Arrows
(Japan) Hinata Shigihara	(Japan) Furukawa Gakuen High School (ja)	(Japan) Toyota Auto Body Queenseis

== Stadiums ==
Regular Round

Adastria Arena, Mito
Beikomu Gymnasium, Amagasaki
CNA Arena, Akita
Ehime Prefecture Budokan, Matsuyama
Fukaya Big Turtle
Goshogawara Citizen Gymnasium
Kobe Green Arena
Hitachinaka City Gymnasium

Ishikawa Sports Center, Kanazawa
Kakogawa Municipal Gymnasium
Kanazawa City Gymnasium
Kartz Kawasaki
Koriyama Gymnasium
Kurobe General Sports Center
Kurume Arena
Mizushima Green Fukuda Park Gymnasium, Kurashiki

Nishio City Gymnasium
Ota Ward Gymnasium, Tokyo
Okazaki Central Gymnasium
River Sakura Arena, Hitachi
Saga Sunrise Park Gymnasium
Saitama Prefecture Budokan, Ageo
Shiga Prefectural Gymnasium, Otsu
Shimadzu Arena, Kyoto
Sky Hall Toyota

Sumiyoshi Sports Center, Osaka
Takahashi Citizen Gymnasium
Todoroki Arena, Kawasaki
Toyama Seibu Sports Center, Tonami
Wing Arena Kariya
Wink Gymnasium, Himeji
YMIT Arena, Kusatsu
Zip Arena, Okayama

Final stage

Saitama City Memorial Gymnasium

Funabashi Arena, Chiba

YMIT Arena, Kusatsu

Yoyogi National Stadium, Tokyo

== Schedule ==
Regular Round begins October 12, 2019 (Saturday) and ends December 29, 2019 (Sunday). Matches are played every Saturday and Sunday.

The Empress' Cup Final Round which has usually been contested during the last week of December is scheduled for March 25–29, 2020—after the season is over.

1. Each team will play twenty-one matches:
  - each in-conference rival three times (IC—15 matches)
  - each out-of-conference rival once (AC Warfare—6 matches)
2. Regular Season is divided into four legs:
  - IC Leg 1: October 12–27, 2019
  - IC Leg 2: November 2–17, 2019
  - AC Warfare Leg: November 23 – December 8, 2019
  - IC Leg 3: December 14–29, 2019
3. Final Stage begins January 11, 2020 (Sat) and ends January 26, 2020 (Sun):
  - Final 8: January 11, 2020 (Sat) – January 19, 2020 (Sun)
    - Challenge 4: January 11, 2020 (Sat) – January 13, 2020 (Mon)
  - Semifinals: January 25, 2020 (Sat)
  - Final & 3rd-place match: January 26, 2020 (Sun)
4. V1-V2 Promotion-Relegation Matches:
  - February 22–23, 2020 (Sat–Sun)
5. Empress' Cup Final Round:
  - March 25–29, 2020

== Season standing procedure ==
The 2019-20 V.League Season brings new rules for how teams will be ranked for the Regular Round.

Previously teams were ranked by:

- Points ->Wins ->Set Percentage ->Scoring Rate

Beginning with the 2019-20 season teams will be ranked in the Regular Round by:

- Wins ->Points ->Set Percentage ->Scoring Rate
1. Teams will be ranked by the number of victories achieved throughout the Regular Round:
2. In the event of a tie, the following first tiebreaker will apply: Total number of points gained per match as follows:
  - Match won 3–0 or 3–1: 3 points for the winner, 0 points for the loser
  - Match won 3–2: 2 points for the winner, 1 point for the loser
  - Match forfeited: 3 points for the winner, 0 points (0–25, 0–25, 0–25) for the loser
3. If teams are still tied after examining points gained and the number of victories, then the results to break the tie will be examined in the following order:
  - Set quotient: if two or more teams are tied on total number of victories, they will be ranked by the quotient resulting from the division of the number of all set won by the number of all sets lost.
  - Points quotient: if the tie persists based on the set quotient, the teams will be ranked by the quotient resulting from the division of all points scored by the total of points lost during all sets.
  - If the tie persists based on the point quotient, the tie will be broken based on the team that won the match of the Round Robin Phase between the tied teams. When the tie in point quotient is between three or more teams, these teams ranked taking into consideration only the matches involving the teams in question.

== Regular Round Results ==
=== In-Conference Leg 1 ===
12 October 2019; 12:00	Denso Airybees	v	Hisamitsu Springs	Nishio City Gymnasium
12 October 2019; 12:00	(Event is Cancelled due to Typhoon); Rescheduled for Saturday 4 Jan 2020 at 12:00			Nishio City Gymnasium

12 October 2019; 12:00	PFU BlueCats	3–1	Kurobe AquaFairies	Ishikawa Sports Center, Kanazawa; Attendance: 777; Referees: Hiroyuki Hara
12 October 2019; 12:00	(25–22, 25–18, 23–25, 25–15); Report A Report B			Ishikawa Sports Center, Kanazawa; Attendance: 777; Referees: Hiroyuki Hara

12 October 2019; 13:00	Hitachi Rivale	3–1	Himeji Victorina	CNA Arena, Akita; Attendance: 2,300; Referees: Yui Asai
12 October 2019; 13:00	(16–25, 25–22, 25–14, 25–18); Report A Report B			CNA Arena, Akita; Attendance: 2,300; Referees: Yui Asai

12 October 2019; 14:00	Toray Arrows	v	Saitama Ageo Medics	Shiga Prefectural Gymnasium, Otsu
12 October 2019; 14:00	(Event is Cancelled due to Typhoon); Rescheduled for Saturday 4 Jan 2020 at 14:00			Shiga Prefectural Gymnasium, Otsu

12 October 2019; 15:00	NEC Red Rockets	v	Okayama Seagulls	Nishio City Gymnasium
12 October 2019; 15:00	(Event is Cancelled due to Typhoon); Rescheduled for Saturday 4 Jan 2020 at 15:00			Nishio City Gymnasium

12 October 2019; 15:00	JT Marvelous	0–3	Toyota Auto Body Queenseis	Ishikawa Sports Center, Kanazawa; Attendance: 985; Referees: Yutaka Moriguchi
12 October 2019; 15:00	(20–25, 23–25, 19–25); Report A Report B			Ishikawa Sports Center, Kanazawa; Attendance: 985; Referees: Yutaka Moriguchi

13 October 2019; 12:00	Denso Airybees	v	Okayama Seagulls	Nishio City Gymnasium
13 October 2019; 12:00	(Event is Cancelled due to Typhoon); Rescheduled for Sunday 5 Jan 2020 12:00			Nishio City Gymnasium

13 October 2019; 12:00	JT Marvelous	3–2	Kurobe AquaFairies	Ishikawa Sports Center, Kanazawa; Attendance: 360; Referees: Yuka Kitamura
13 October 2019; 12:00	(25-20, 23-25, 25-22, 12-25, 17-15); Report A Report B			Ishikawa Sports Center, Kanazawa; Attendance: 360; Referees: Yuka Kitamura

13 October 2019; 15:00	Hisamitsu Springs	v	NEC Red Rockets	Nishio City Gymnasium
13 October 2019; 15:00	(Event is Cancelled due to Typhoon); Rescheduled for Sunday 5 Jan 2020 at 15:00			Nishio City Gymnasium

13 October 2019; 15:15	PFU BlueCats	0–3	Toyota Auto Body Queenseis	Ishikawa Sports Center, Kanazawa; Attendance: 978; Referees: Nobuko Sasaki
13 October 2019; 15:15	(17-25, 11-25, 19-25); Report A Report B			Ishikawa Sports Center, Kanazawa; Attendance: 978; Referees: Nobuko Sasaki

19 October 2019; 12:00	Toray Arrows	3–1	PFU BlueCats	Saitama Prefecture Budokan, Ageo; Attendance: 1,209; Referees: Yui Asai
19 October 2019; 12:00	(23-25, 25-19, 25-23, 25-15); Report A Report B			Saitama Prefecture Budokan, Ageo; Attendance: 1,209; Referees: Yui Asai

19 October 2019; 13:00	NEC Red Rockets	0–3	Denso Airybees	Kawasaki Sports and Cultural Center; Attendance: 1,733; Referees: Sawa Itarudai
19 October 2019; 13:00	(15-25, 22-25, 14-25); Report A Report B			Kawasaki Sports and Cultural Center; Attendance: 1,733; Referees: Sawa Itarudai

19 October 2019; 13:00	Kurobe AquaFairies	1–3	Toyota Auto Body Queenseis	Toyama Seibu Sports Center, Tonami; Attendance: 1,250; Referees: Nana Yoshioka
19 October 2019; 13:00	(22-25, 22-25, 25-20, 14-25); Report A Report B			Toyama Seibu Sports Center, Tonami; Attendance: 1,250; Referees: Nana Yoshioka

19 October 2019; 13:05	Hisamitsu Springs	3–0	Hitachi Rivale	Saga Sunrise Park Gymnasium; Attendance: 1,576; Referees: Hirokazu Tomita
19 October 2019; 13:05	(25-21, 25-23, 25-22); Report A Report B			Saga Sunrise Park Gymnasium; Attendance: 1,576; Referees: Hirokazu Tomita

19 October 2019; 15:00	Saitama Ageo Medics	2–3	JT Marvelous	Saitama Prefecture Budokan, Ageo; Attendance: 1,616; Referees: Futoshi輔
19 October 2019; 15:00	(25-23, 19-25, 23-25, 25-21, 6-15); Report A Report B			Saitama Prefecture Budokan, Ageo; Attendance: 1,616; Referees: Futoshi輔

19 October 2019; 16:00	Okayama Seagulls	3–0	Himeji Victorina	Saga Sunrise Park Gymnasium; Attendance: 1,858; Referees: Eshita Takeshi
19 October 2019; 16:00	(25-14, 25-14, 25-14); Report A Report B			Saga Sunrise Park Gymnasium; Attendance: 1,858; Referees: Eshita Takeshi

20 October 2019; 12:30	Hisamitsu Springs	3–0	Himeji Victorina	Saitama Prefecture Budokan, Ageo; Attendance: 1,658; Referees: Yunichi Hayashi
20 October 2019; 12:30	(26-24, 25-10, 25-22); Report A Report B			Saitama Prefecture Budokan, Ageo; Attendance: 1,658; Referees: Yunichi Hayashi

20 October 2019; 13:05	JT Marvelous	3–2	Toray Arrows	Saitama Prefecture Budokan, Ageo; Attendance: 1,328; Referees: Yui Asai
20 October 2019; 13:05	(25-21, 25-19, 25-20); Report A Report B			Saitama Prefecture Budokan, Ageo; Attendance: 1,328; Referees: Yui Asai

20 October 2019; 15:30	Hitachi Rivale	3–0	Okayama Seagulls	Saga Sunrise Park Gymnasium; Attendance: 1,914; Referees: Ryogo Yamamoto
20 October 2019; 15:30	(26-24, 25-10, 25-22); Report A Report B			Saga Sunrise Park Gymnasium; Attendance: 1,914; Referees: Ryogo Yamamoto

20 October 2019; 16:00	Saitama Ageo Medics	3–1	PFU BlueCats	Saitama Prefecture Budokan, Ageo; Attendance: 2,524; Referees: Toshie Aii
20 October 2019; 16:00	(21-25, 25-20, 25-16, 25-22); Report A Report B			Saitama Prefecture Budokan, Ageo; Attendance: 2,524; Referees: Toshie Aii

26 October 2019; 11:00	Saitama Ageo Medics	3–0	Kurobe AquaFairies	YMIT Arena, Kusatsu; Attendance: 2,500; Referees: グレッグルーオー
26 October 2019; 11:00	(25-21, 25-19, 26-24); Report A Report B			YMIT Arena, Kusatsu; Attendance: 2,500; Referees: グレッグルーオー

26 October 2019; 12:05	Denso Airybees	3–0	Himeji Victorina	Koriyama Gymnasium; Attendance: 1,500; Referees: Hiroaki Takahashi
26 October 2019; 12:05	(25-16, 25-18, 25-19); Report A Report B			Koriyama Gymnasium; Attendance: 1,500; Referees: Hiroaki Takahashi

26 October 2019; 13:30	Toray Arrows	1–3	Toyota Auto Body Queenseis	YMIT Arena, Kusatsu; Attendance: 2,500; Referees: Ken Nakayama
26 October 2019; 13:30	(25-21, 22-25, 20-25, 23-25); Report A Report B			YMIT Arena, Kusatsu; Attendance: 2,500; Referees: Ken Nakayama

26 October 2019; 14:05	Okayama Seagulls	3–0	Hisamitsu Springs	Takahashi Citizen Gymnasium; Attendance: 1,500; Referees: Hiroaki Takahashi
26 October 2019; 14:05	(25-18, 25-18, 25-22); Report A Report B			Takahashi Citizen Gymnasium; Attendance: 1,500; Referees: Hiroaki Takahashi

26 October 2019; 15:00	Hitachi Rivale	0–3	NEC Red Rockets	Koriyama Gymnasium; Attendance: 1,900; Referees: Toshie Aii
26 October 2019; 15:00	(19-25, 24-26, 23-25); Report A Report B			Koriyama Gymnasium; Attendance: 1,900; Referees: Toshie Aii

26 October 2019; 16:20	JT Marvelous	3–0	PFU BlueCats	YMIT Arena, Kusatsu; Attendance: 2,500; Referees: Ryota Tsujito
26 October 2019; 16:20	(25-20, 25-22, 25-18); Report A Report B			YMIT Arena, Kusatsu; Attendance: 2,500; Referees: Ryota Tsujito

27 October 2019; 12:00	Denso Airybees	3–1	Hitachi Rivale	Koriyama Gymnasium; Attendance: 2,250; Referees: Kensuke Kuwahara
27 October 2019; 12:00	(25-22, 22-25, 25-23, 25-15); Report A Report B			Koriyama Gymnasium; Attendance: 2,250; Referees: Kensuke Kuwahara

27 October 2019; 12:00	Toyota Auto Body Queenseis	3–1	Saitama Ageo Medics	YMIT Arena, Kusatsu; Attendance: 2,100; Referees: Nana Yoshioka
27 October 2019; 12:00	(15-25, 25-23, 25-21, 25-19); Report A Report B			YMIT Arena, Kusatsu; Attendance: 2,100; Referees: Nana Yoshioka

27 October 2019; 15:00	NEC Red Rockets	3–1	Himeji Victorina	Koriyama Gymnasium; Attendance: 2,100; Referees: Hiroaki Takahashi
27 October 2019; 15:00	(20-25, 25-18, 25-17, 25-18); Report A Report B			Koriyama Gymnasium; Attendance: 2,100; Referees: Hiroaki Takahashi

27 October 2019; 15:00	Toray Arrows	3–1	Kurobe AquaFairies	YMIT Arena, Kusatsu; Attendance: 2,100; Referees: Ryota Tsujito
27 October 2019; 15:00	(27-25, 21-25, 25-21, 28-26); Report A Report B			YMIT Arena, Kusatsu; Attendance: 2,100; Referees: Ryota Tsujito

==== Standings after Leg 1 ====
Four teams from Premier Conference are 2 matches behind, and two teams from Star Conference are 1 match behind—due to cancelled matches opening weekend. The five cancelled matches have been rescheduled for the end of the season:

- Sat 4 Jan 2020: 12:00 Denso v Hisamitsu; 15:00 NEC v Okayama; 14:00 Toray v Saitama
- Sun 5 Jan 2020: 12:00 Denso v Okayama; 15:00 Hisamitsu v NEC

Premier Conference
#	Team	Wins	Losses	Points	Sets W	Sets L	Sets Ratio	Points W	Points L	Points Ratio
1	Denso Airybees	3	0	9	9	1	9.00	247	189	1.31
2	Okayama Seagulls	2	1	6	6	3	2.00	210	175	1.20
3	Hisamitsu Springs	2	1	6	6	3	2.00	209	197	1.06
4	NEC Red Rockets	2	1	6	6	4	1.50	222	219	1.01
5	Hitachi Rivale	2	3	6	7	10	0.70	383	389	0.98
6	Himeji Victorina	0	5	0	2	15	0.13	310	412	0.75

Star Conference
#	Team	Wins	Losses	Points	Sets W	Sets L	Sets Ratio	Points W	Points L	Points Ratio
1	Toyota Auto Body Queenseis	5	0	15	15	3	5.00	431	370	1.16
2	JT Marvelous	4	1	9	12	9	1.33	449	438	1.03
3	Saitama Ageo Medics	2	2	7	9	7	1.29	358	346	1.03
4	Toray Arrows	2	2	7	9	8	1.12	387	376	1.03
5	PFU BlueCats	1	4	3	5	13	0.38	370	424	0.87
6	Kurobe AquaFairies	0	5	1	5	15	0.33	431	472	0.91

=== In-Conference Leg 2 ===
2 November 2019; 12:00	NEC Red Rockets	3–0	Himeji Victorina	Ota Ward Gymnasium, Tokyo; Attendance: 2,600; Referees: Yuka Kitamura
2 November 2019; 12:00	(25-19, 27-25, 27-25); Report A Report B			Ota Ward Gymnasium, Tokyo; Attendance: 2,600; Referees: Yuka Kitamura

2 November 2019; 12:00	JT Marvelous	2–3	Toray Arrows	Kanazawa City Gymnasium; Attendance: 739; Referees: Kazuyoshi Yamamoto
2 November 2019; 12:00	(25-19, 21-25, 19-25, 25-19, 11-15); Report A Report B			Kanazawa City Gymnasium; Attendance: 739; Referees: Kazuyoshi Yamamoto

2 November 2019; 15:00	Saitama Ageo Medics	2–3	Toyota Auto Body Queenseis	Fukaya Gymnasium (Fukaya Big Turtle); Attendance: 596; Referees: Sawa Itarudai
2 November 2019; 15:00	(25-19, 23-25, 25-27, 30-28, 10-15); Report A Report B			Fukaya Gymnasium (Fukaya Big Turtle); Attendance: 596; Referees: Sawa Itarudai

2 November 2019; 15:05	Hisamitsu Springs	2–3	Hitachi Rivale	Ota Ward Gymnasium, Tokyo; Attendance: 2,400; Referees: Toshie Aii
2 November 2019; 15:05	(25-19, 23-25, 25-21, 21-25, 13-15); Report A Report B			Ota Ward Gymnasium, Tokyo; Attendance: 2,400; Referees: Toshie Aii

2 November 2019; 15:10	PFU BlueCats	0–3	Kurobe AquaFairies	Kanazawa City Gymnasium; Attendance: 1,135; Referees: Nobuko Sasaki
2 November 2019; 15:10	(23-25, 27-29, 17-25); Report A Report B			Kanazawa City Gymnasium; Attendance: 1,135; Referees: Nobuko Sasaki

3 November 2019; 12:05	Toray Arrows	3–1	Kurobe AquaFairies	Kanazawa City Gymnasium; Attendance: 646; Referees: Nana Yoshioka
3 November 2019; 12:05	(25-12, 16-25, 25-16, 25-18); Report A Report B			Kanazawa City Gymnasium; Attendance: 646; Referees: Nana Yoshioka

3 November 2019; 12:05	NEC Red Rockets	3–0	Hisamitsu Springs	Ota Ward Gymnasium, Tokyo; Attendance: 3,100; Referees: Hiroaki Takahashi
3 November 2019; 12:05	(25-21, 25-23, 25-20); Report A Report B			Ota Ward Gymnasium, Tokyo; Attendance: 3,100; Referees: Hiroaki Takahashi

3 November 2019; 13:00	Okayama Seagulls	0–3	Denso Airybees	Mizushima Green Fukuda Park Gymnasium, Kurashiki; Attendance: 1,320; Referees: Kyoko Tanemoto
3 November 2019; 13:00	(15-25, 23-25, 23-25); Report A Report B			Mizushima Green Fukuda Park Gymnasium, Kurashiki; Attendance: 1,320; Referees: Kyoko Tanemoto

3 November 2019; 15:00	Hitachi Rivale	0–3	Himeji Victorina	Ota Ward Gymnasium, Tokyo; Attendance: 2,050; Referees: Toshie Aii
3 November 2019; 15:00	(19-25, 29-31, 20-25); Report A Report B			Ota Ward Gymnasium, Tokyo; Attendance: 2,050; Referees: Toshie Aii

3 November 2019; 15:00	PFU BlueCats	1–3	JT Marvelous	Kanazawa City Gymnasium; Attendance: 1,090; Referees: Hiroyuki Hara
3 November 2019; 15:00	(25-27, 27-29, 25-19, 16-25); Report A Report B			Kanazawa City Gymnasium; Attendance: 1,090; Referees: Hiroyuki Hara

9 November 2019; 11:00	Himeji Victorina	0–3	Denso Airybees	Kobe Green Arena; Attendance: 2,000; Referees: Kyoko Tanemoto
9 November 2019; 11:00	(15-25, 15-25, 20-25); Report A Report B			Kobe Green Arena; Attendance: 2,000; Referees: Kyoko Tanemoto

9 November 2019; 12:00	Toray Arrows	3–0	PFU BlueCats	Ehime Prefecture Budokan, Matsuyama; Attendance: 2,900; Referees: Junichi Hayashi
9 November 2019; 12:00	(25-15, 25-14, 25-17); Report A Report B			Ehime Prefecture Budokan, Matsuyama; Attendance: 2,900; Referees: Junichi Hayashi

9 November 2019; 12:00	JT Marvelous	3–1	Saitama Ageo Medics	Sumiyoshi Sports Center, Osaka; Attendance: 877; Referees: Daisuke Togawa
9 November 2019; 12:00	(25-17, 20-25, 25-22, 25-23); Report A Report B			Sumiyoshi Sports Center, Osaka; Attendance: 877; Referees: Daisuke Togawa

9 November 2019; 13:10	Hisamitsu Springs	3–2	Okayama Seagulls	Kobe Green Arena; Attendance: 2,900; Referees: Nana Yoshioka
9 November 2019; 13:10	(25-20, 26-24, 18-25, 20-25, 15-11); Report A Report B			Kobe Green Arena; Attendance: 2,900; Referees: Nana Yoshioka

9 November 2019; 15:00	Toyota Auto Body Queenseis	3–2	Kurobe AquaFairies	Sumiyoshi Sports Center, Osaka; Attendance: 950; Referees: Ken Nakayama
9 November 2019; 15:00	(20-25, 25-16, 17-25, 25-21, 15-9); Report A Report B			Sumiyoshi Sports Center, Osaka; Attendance: 950; Referees: Ken Nakayama

9 November 2019; 16:20	NEC Red Rockets	3–0	Hitachi Rivale	Kobe Green Arena; Attendance: 2,200; Referees: Nobuko Sasaki
9 November 2019; 16:20	(25-18, 30-28, 25-20); Report A Report B			Kobe Green Arena; Attendance: 2,200; Referees: Nobuko Sasaki

10 November 2019; 12:00	JT Marvelous	3–1	Toyota Auto Body Queenseis	Sumiyoshi Sports Center, Osaka; Attendance: 824; Referees: Tomoto Shiro
10 November 2019; 12:00	(25-14, 22-25, 25-18, 25-18); Report A Report B			Sumiyoshi Sports Center, Osaka; Attendance: 824; Referees: Tomoto Shiro

10 November 2019; 13:00	Hisamitsu Springs	1–3	Denso Airybees	Kobe Green Arena; Attendance: 2,300; Referees: Toshie Aii
10 November 2019; 13:00	(25-21, 21-25, 12-25, 22-25); Report A Report B			Kobe Green Arena; Attendance: 2,300; Referees: Toshie Aii

10 November 2019; 15:00	Saitama Ageo Medics	3–1	Kurobe AquaFairies	Sumiyoshi Sports Center, Osaka; Attendance: 450; Referees: Ken Nishinakano
10 November 2019; 15:00	(25-19, 25-20, 23-25, 25-22); Report A Report B			Sumiyoshi Sports Center, Osaka; Attendance: 450; Referees: Ken Nishinakano

10 November 2019; 16:00	Okayama Seagulls	3–0	Himeji Victorina	Kobe Green Arena; Attendance: 1,500; Referees: Yuka Kitamura
10 November 2019; 16:00	(25-12, 25-14, 25-21); Report A Report B			Kobe Green Arena; Attendance: 1,500; Referees: Yuka Kitamura

16 November 2019; 12:00	Toyota Auto Body Queenseis	3–2	PFU BlueCats	Sky Hall Toyota; Attendance: 1350; Referees: Tomoto Shiro
16 November 2019; 12:00	(25-14, 19-25, 25-17, 23-25, 15-12); Report A Report B			Sky Hall Toyota; Attendance: 1350; Referees: Tomoto Shiro

16 November 2019; 12:00	NEC Red Rockets	0–3	Okayama Seagulls	River Sakura Arena, Hitachi; Attendance: 928; Referees: Mitsuko Masuoka
16 November 2019; 12:00	(19-25, 10-25, 26-28); Report A Report B			River Sakura Arena, Hitachi; Attendance: 928; Referees: Mitsuko Masuoka

16 November 2019; 13:00	Kurobe AquaFairies	0–3	JT Marvelous	Kurobe General Sports Center; Attendance: 1700; Referees: Sawa Itarudai
16 November 2019; 13:00	(14-25, 17-25, 24-26); Report A Report B			Kurobe General Sports Center; Attendance: 1700; Referees: Sawa Itarudai

16 November 2019; 14:00	Himeji Victorina	3–0	Hisamitsu Springs	Wink Gymnasium, Himeji; Attendance: 3000; Referees: Ryota Tsujito
16 November 2019; 14:00	(25-22, 25-20, 25-23); Report A Report B			Wink Gymnasium, Himeji; Attendance: 3000; Referees: Ryota Tsujito

16 November 2019; 15:00	Hitachi Rivale	0–3	Denso Airybees	River Sakura Arena, Hitachi; Attendance: 1110; Referees: Atsushi Hattori
16 November 2019; 15:00	(23-25, 20-25, 20-25); Report A Report B			River Sakura Arena, Hitachi; Attendance: 1110; Referees: Atsushi Hattori

16 November 2019; 15:15	Toray Arrows	3–1	Saitama Ageo Medics	Sky Hall Toyota; Attendance: 1250; Referees: Kyoko Tanemoto
16 November 2019; 15:15	(21-25, 25-20, 25-13, 25-21); Report A Report B			Sky Hall Toyota; Attendance: 1250; Referees: Kyoko Tanemoto

17 November 2019; 12:00	Toyota Auto Body Queenseis	0–3	Toray Arrows	Sky Hall Toyota; Attendance: 2,400; Referees: Yuka Kitamura
17 November 2019; 12:00	(20-25, 14-25, 22-25); Report A Report B			Sky Hall Toyota; Attendance: 2,400; Referees: Yuka Kitamura

17 November 2019; 12:05	Denso Airybees	3–0	NEC Red Rockets	River Sakura Arena, Hitachi; Attendance: 954; Referees: Toshie Aii
17 November 2019; 12:05	(25-16, 25-17, 25-16); Report A Report B			River Sakura Arena, Hitachi; Attendance: 954; Referees: Toshie Aii

17 November 2019; 15:00	Saitama Ageo Medics	3–0	PFU BlueCats	Sky Hall Toyota; Attendance: 1,200; Referees: Hiroyuki Hara
17 November 2019; 15:00	(25-20, 27-25, 25-21); Report A Report B			Sky Hall Toyota; Attendance: 1,200; Referees: Hiroyuki Hara

17 November 2019; 15:00	Hitachi Rivale	2–3	Okayama Seagulls	River Sakura Arena, Hitachi; Attendance: 1,185; Referees: Atsushi Hattori
17 November 2019; 15:00	(25-19, 21-25, 15-25, 25-23, 13-15); Report A Report B			River Sakura Arena, Hitachi; Attendance: 1,185; Referees: Atsushi Hattori

==== Standings after Leg 2 ====
Four teams from Premier Conference are 2 matches behind, and two teams from Star Conference are 1 match behind—due to cancelled matches opening weekend. The five cancelled matches have been rescheduled for the end of the season:

- Sat 4 Jan 2020: 12:00 Denso v Hisamitsu; 15:00 NEC v Okayama; 14:00 Toray v Saitama
- Sun 5 Jan 2020: 12:00 Denso v Okayama; 15:00 Hisamitsu v NEC

Premier Conference
#	Team	Wins	Losses	Points	Sets W	Sets L	Sets Ratio	Points W	Points L	Points Ratio
1	Denso Airybees	8	0	24	24	2	12.00	643	492	1.31
2	Okayama Seagulls	5	3	15	17	11	1.55	636	555	1.15
3	NEC Red Rockets	5	3	15	15	10	1.50	560	571	0.98
4	Hisamitsu Springs	3	5	9	12	17	0.71	629	653	0.96
5	Hitachi Rivale	3	7	9	12	24	0.50	784	839	0.93
6	Himeji Victorina	2	8	6	8	24	0.33	632	774	0.82

Star Conference
#	Team	Wins	Losses	Points	Sets W	Sets L	Sets Ratio	Points W	Points L	Points Ratio
1	JT Marvelous	8	2	22	26	15	1.73	918	851	1.08
2	Toyota Auto Body Queenseis	8	2	21	25	15	1.67	885	844	1.05
3	Toray Arrows	7	2	21	24	12	2.00	827	729	1.13
4	Saitama Ageo Medics	4	5	14	19	17	1.12	812	803	1.01
5	Kurobe AquaFairies	1	9	5	12	27	0.44	818	906	0.90
6	PFU BlueCats	1	9	4	8	28	0.29	735	862	0.85

=== Inter-Conference Leg ===
23 November 2019; 12:00	NEC Red Rockets	3–1	JT Marvelous	Todoroki Arena, Kawasaki; Attendance: 3,496; Referees: Daisuke Togawa
23 November 2019; 12:00	(25-22, 23-25, 25-11, 25-21); Report A Report B			Todoroki Arena, Kawasaki; Attendance: 3,496; Referees: Daisuke Togawa

23 November 2019; 12:00	Himeji Victorina	2–3	Toyota Auto Body Queenseis	Shimadzu Arena, Kyoto; Attendance: 1,150; Referees: Nana Yoshioka
23 November 2019; 12:00	(25-21, 20-25, 15-25, 25-23, 10-15); Report A Report B			Shimadzu Arena, Kyoto; Attendance: 1,150; Referees: Nana Yoshioka

23 November 2019; 13:00	Okayama Seagulls	3–0	Toray Arrows	Zip Arena, Okayama; Attendance: 2,700; Referees: Ryota Tsujito
23 November 2019; 13:00	(25-19, 25-20, 25-23); Report A Report B			Zip Arena, Okayama; Attendance: 2,700; Referees: Ryota Tsujito

23 November 2019; 15:00	Saitama Ageo Medics	3–2	Hitachi Rivale	Shimadzu Arena, Kyoto; Attendance: 1,950; Referees: Greg Rouault
23 November 2019; 15:00	(33-31, 23-25, 25-20, 21-25, 15-11); Report A Report B			Shimadzu Arena, Kyoto; Attendance: 1,950; Referees: Greg Rouault

23 November 2019; 15:00	Denso Airybees	3–0	Kurobe AquaFairies	Todoroki Arena, Kawasaki; Attendance: 2,334; Referees: Sawa Itarudai
23 November 2019; 15:00	(25-22, 25-19, 25-11); Report A Report B			Todoroki Arena, Kawasaki; Attendance: 2,334; Referees: Sawa Itarudai

23 November 2019; 16:00	Hisamitsu Springs	3–1	PFU BlueCats	Zip Arena, Okayama; Attendance: 2,600; Referees: Yunichi Hayashi
23 November 2019; 16:00	(25-18, 22-25, 25-18, 25-14); Report A Report B			Zip Arena, Okayama; Attendance: 2,600; Referees: Yunichi Hayashi

24 November 2019; 11:00	Hitachi Rivale	2–3	Toyota Auto Body Queenseis	Shimadzu Arena, Kyoto; Attendance: 1,430; Referees: Tomoto Shiro
24 November 2019; 11:00	(12-25, 19-25, 25-18, 25-22, 9-15); Report A Report B			Shimadzu Arena, Kyoto; Attendance: 1,430; Referees: Tomoto Shiro

24 November 2019; 12:00	NEC Red Rockets	3–1	Kurobe AquaFairies	Todoroki Arena, Kawasaki; Attendance: 3,336; Referees: Mitsuko Masuoka
24 November 2019; 12:00	(25-20, 25-23, 22-25, 25-17); Report A Report B			Todoroki Arena, Kawasaki; Attendance: 3,336; Referees: Mitsuko Masuoka

24 November 2019; 13:00	Okayama Seagulls	3–2	PFU BlueCats	Zip Arena, Okayama; Attendance: 1,700; Referees: Nobuko Sasaki
24 November 2019; 13:00	(25-27 25-17 25-20 23-25 15-6); Report A Report B			Zip Arena, Okayama; Attendance: 1,700; Referees: Nobuko Sasaki

24 November 2019; 14:00	Saitama Ageo Medics	3–0	Himeji Victorina	Shimadzu Arena, Kyoto; Attendance: 2,050; Referees: Yuka Kitamura
24 November 2019; 14:00	(25-20, 25-20, 25-10); Report A Report B			Shimadzu Arena, Kyoto; Attendance: 2,050; Referees: Yuka Kitamura

24 November 2019; 15:00	JT Marvelous	3–1	Denso Airybees	Todoroki Arena, Kawasaki; Attendance: 2,043; Referees: Toshie Aii
24 November 2019; 15:00	(25-13, 20-25, 25-20, 25-17); Report A Report B			Todoroki Arena, Kawasaki; Attendance: 2,043; Referees: Toshie Aii

24 November 2019; 16:30	Hisamitsu Springs	1–3	Toray Arrows	Zip Arena, Okayama; Attendance: 1,400; Referees: Hirokazu Tomita
24 November 2019; 16:30	(23-25, 25-21, 18-25, 17-25); Report A Report B			Zip Arena, Okayama; Attendance: 1,400; Referees: Hirokazu Tomita

30 November 2019; 12:00	Denso Airybees	3–2	Toyota Auto Body Queenseis	Koriyama Gymnasium; Attendance: 2,580; Referees: Nobuko Sasaki
30 November 2019; 12:00	(27-25, 22-25, 21-25, 26-24, 15-12); Report A Report B			Koriyama Gymnasium; Attendance: 2,580; Referees: Nobuko Sasaki

30 November 2019; 12:00	Toray Arrows	0–3	Hitachi Rivale	Goshogawara Citizen Gymnasium; Attendance: 1,300; Referees: Yui Asai
30 November 2019; 12:00	(27-29, 10-25, 15-25); Report A Report B			Goshogawara Citizen Gymnasium; Attendance: 1,300; Referees: Yui Asai

30 November 2019; 13:00	Hisamitsu Springs	3–1	Kurobe AquaFairies	Saga Sunrise Park Gymnasium; Attendance: 1,270; Referees: Nana Yoshioka
30 November 2019; 13:00	(25-15, 25-22, 19-25, 25-23); Report A Report B			Saga Sunrise Park Gymnasium; Attendance: 1,270; Referees: Nana Yoshioka

30 November 2019; 15:00	PFU BlueCats	3–1	Himeji Victorina	Goshogawara Citizen Gymnasium; Attendance: 1,400; Referees: Sawa Itarudai
30 November 2019; 15:00	(18-25, 25-20, 25-21, 25-22); Report A Report B			Goshogawara Citizen Gymnasium; Attendance: 1,400; Referees: Sawa Itarudai

30 November 2019; 15:45	NEC Red Rockets	0–3	Saitama Ageo Medics	Koriyama Gymnasium; Attendance: 2,000; Referees: Yuka Kitamura
30 November 2019; 15:45	(17-25, 20-25, 22-25); Report A Report B			Koriyama Gymnasium; Attendance: 2,000; Referees: Yuka Kitamura

30 November 2019; 16:00	JT Marvelous	3–0	Okayama Seagulls	Saga Sunrise Park Gymnasium; Attendance: 1,511; Referees: Ryogo Yamamoto
30 November 2019; 16:00	(25-22, 25-20, 26-24); Report A Report B			Saga Sunrise Park Gymnasium; Attendance: 1,511; Referees: Ryogo Yamamoto

01 December 2019; 11:00	Toray Arrows	3–0	Himeji Victorina	Goshogawara Citizen Gymnasium; Attendance: 1,325; Referees: Sawa Itarudai
01 December 2019; 11:00	(25-16, 27-25, 25-18); Report A Report B			Goshogawara Citizen Gymnasium; Attendance: 1,325; Referees: Sawa Itarudai

01 December 2019; 12:00	Denso Airybees	0–3	Saitama Ageo Medics	Koriyama Gymnasium; Attendance: 2,430; Referees: Mitsuko Masuoka
01 December 2019; 12:00	(21-25, 20-25, 18-25); Report A Report B			Koriyama Gymnasium; Attendance: 2,430; Referees: Mitsuko Masuoka

01 December 2019; 12:35	Hisamitsu Springs	0–3	JT Marvelous	Saga Sunrise Park Gymnasium; Attendance: 1,782; Referees: Ryogo Yamamoto
01 December 2019; 12:35	(19-25, 25-27, 18-25); Report A Report B			Saga Sunrise Park Gymnasium; Attendance: 1,782; Referees: Ryogo Yamamoto

01 December 2019; 14:00	PFU BlueCats	3–2	Hitachi Rivale	Goshogawara Citizen Gymnasium; Attendance: 1,723; Referees: Hiroaki Takahashi
01 December 2019; 14:00	(14-25, 25-18, 26-28, 25-22, 15-13); Report A Report B			Goshogawara Citizen Gymnasium; Attendance: 1,723; Referees: Hiroaki Takahashi

01 December 2019; 15:00	Toyota Auto Body Queenseis	3–0	NEC Red Rockets	Koriyama Gymnasium; Attendance: 2,100; Referees: Kensuke Kuwahara
01 December 2019; 15:00	(25-17, 25-16, 25-20); Report A Report B			Koriyama Gymnasium; Attendance: 2,100; Referees: Kensuke Kuwahara

01 December 2019; 15:30	Okayama Seagulls	3–0	Kurobe AquaFairies	Saga Sunrise Park Gymnasium; Attendance: 1,866; Referees: Junichi Hayashi
01 December 2019; 15:30	(25-13, 25-13, 25-23); Report A Report B			Saga Sunrise Park Gymnasium; Attendance: 1,866; Referees: Junichi Hayashi

07 December 2019; 12:00	Toray Arrows	3–0	NEC Red Rockets	Kanazawa City Gymnasium; Attendance: 1,823; Referees: Kyoko Tanemoto
07 December 2019; 12:00	(25-21, 25-22, 25-21); Report A Report B			Kanazawa City Gymnasium; Attendance: 1,823; Referees: Kyoko Tanemoto

07 December 2019; 12:00	JT Marvelous	3–0	Hitachi Rivale	Kakogawa Municipal Gymnasium; Attendance: 1,600; Referees: Greg Rouault
07 December 2019; 12:00	(25-17, 25-16, 25-19); Report A Report B			Kakogawa Municipal Gymnasium; Attendance: 1,600; Referees: Greg Rouault

07 December 2019; 13:00	Okayama Seagulls	3–1	Saitama Ageo Medics	Zip Arena, Okayama; Attendance: 1,370; Referees: Mitsuko Masuoka
07 December 2019; 13:00	(21-25, 26-24, 25-19, 25-22); Report A Report B			Zip Arena, Okayama; Attendance: 1,370; Referees: Mitsuko Masuoka

07 December 2019; 15:00	Kurobe AquaFairies	0–3	Himeji Victorina	Kakogawa Municipal Gymnasium; Attendance: 1,350; Referees: Yuka Kitamura
07 December 2019; 15:00	(20-25, 20-25, 20-25); Report A Report B			Kakogawa Municipal Gymnasium; Attendance: 1,350; Referees: Yuka Kitamura

07 December 2019; 15:00	Denso Airybees	3–2	PFU BlueCats	Kanazawa City Gymnasium; Attendance: 1,950; Referees: Nana Yoshioka
07 December 2019; 15:00	(25-23, 23-25, 11-25, 25-14, 15-13); Report A Report B			Kanazawa City Gymnasium; Attendance: 1,950; Referees: Nana Yoshioka

07 December 2019; 16:00	Hisamitsu Springs	3–1	Toyota Auto Body Queenseis	Zip Arena, Okayama; Attendance: 1,100; Referees: Nobuko Sasaki
07 December 2019; 16:00	(23-25, 25-19, 25-23, 25-23); Report A Report B			Zip Arena, Okayama; Attendance: 1,100; Referees: Nobuko Sasaki

08 December 2019; 12:00	JT Marvelous	3–0	Himeji Victorina	Kakogawa Municipal Gymnasium; Attendance: 1,800; Referees: Yuka Kitamura
08 December 2019; 12:00	(25-18, 25-22, 25-18); Report A Report B			Kakogawa Municipal Gymnasium; Attendance: 1,800; Referees: Yuka Kitamura

08 December 2019; 12:00	Toray Arrows	2–3	Denso Airybees	Kanazawa City Gymnasium; Attendance: 1,254; Referees: Yutaka Moriguchi
08 December 2019; 12:00	(21-25, 25-23, 25-17, 24-26, 12-15); Report A Report B			Kanazawa City Gymnasium; Attendance: 1,254; Referees: Yutaka Moriguchi

08 December 2019; 13:00	Okayama Seagulls	3–0	Toyota Auto Body Queenseis	Zip Arena, Okayama; Attendance: 2,000; Referees: Ken Nishinakano
08 December 2019; 13:00	(25-23, 25-17, 25-23); Report A Report B			Zip Arena, Okayama; Attendance: 2,000; Referees: Ken Nishinakano

08 December 2019; 15:00	Hitachi Rivale	3–0	Kurobe AquaFairies	Kakogawa Municipal Gymnasium; Attendance: 1,300; Referees: Ryota Tsujito
08 December 2019; 15:00	(25-13, 25-18, 25-16); Report A Report B			Kakogawa Municipal Gymnasium; Attendance: 1,300; Referees: Ryota Tsujito

08 December 2019; 15:00	PFU BlueCats	1–3	NEC Red Rockets	Kanazawa City Gymnasium; Attendance: 1,663; Referees: Tomoto Shiro
08 December 2019; 15:00	(22-25, 25-12, 20-25, 14-25); Report A Report B			Kanazawa City Gymnasium; Attendance: 1,663; Referees: Tomoto Shiro

08 December 2019; 16:00	Hisamitsu Springs	0–3	Saitama Ageo Medics	Zip Arena, Okayama; Attendance: 1,100; Referees: Ken Nakayama
08 December 2019; 16:00	(18-25, 24-26, 19-25); Report A Report B			Zip Arena, Okayama; Attendance: 1,100; Referees: Ken Nakayama

=== In-Conference Leg 3 ===
14 December 2019; 12:00	Toyota Auto Body Queenseis	0–3	JT Marvelous	Wing Arena Kariya; Attendance: 1,827; Referees: Nobuko Sasaki
14 December 2019; 12:00	(14-25, 14-25, 23-25); Report A Report B			Wing Arena Kariya; Attendance: 1,827; Referees: Nobuko Sasaki

14 December 2019; 13:00	NEC Red Rockets	1–3	Okayama Seagulls	Ota Ward Gymnasium, Tokyo; Attendance: 3,064; Referees: Kazuyoshi Yamamoto
14 December 2019; 13:00	(20-25, 18-25, 25-18, 21-25); Report A Report B			Ota Ward Gymnasium, Tokyo; Attendance: 3,064; Referees: Kazuyoshi Yamamoto

14 December 2019; 13:35	Denso Airybees	3–0	Himeji Victorina	Adastria Arena, Mito; Attendance: 1,381; Referees: Nana Yoshioka
14 December 2019; 13:35	(25-14, 25-21, 25-21); Report A Report B			Adastria Arena, Mito; Attendance: 1,381; Referees: Nana Yoshioka

14 December 2019; 15:00	Saitama Ageo Medics	3–0	Kurobe AquaFairies	Fukaya Big Turtle; Attendance: 793; Referees: Kazuyoshi Yamamoto
14 December 2019; 15:00	(25-15, 25-23, 25-13); Report A Report B			Fukaya Big Turtle; Attendance: 793; Referees: Kazuyoshi Yamamoto

14 December 2019; 15:00	Toray Arrows	3–1	PFU BlueCats	Wing Arena Kariya; Attendance: 1,400; Referees: Ken Nakayama
14 December 2019; 15:00	(23-25, 25-17, 25-14, 25-22); Report A Report B			Wing Arena Kariya; Attendance: 1,400; Referees: Ken Nakayama

14 December 2019; 15:40	Hitachi Rivale	2–3	Hisamitsu Springs	Adastria Arena, Mito; Attendance: 1,845; Referees: Atsushi Hattori
14 December 2019; 15:40	(25-22, 22-25, 22-25, 27-25, 9-15); Report A Report B			Adastria Arena, Mito; Attendance: 1,845; Referees: Atsushi Hattori

15 December 2019; 12:00	Toyota Auto Body Queenseis	0–3	Toray Arrows	Wing Arena Kariya; Attendance: 2,400; Referees: Tomoto Shiro
15 December 2019; 12:00	(22-25, 18-25, 20-25); Report A Report B			Wing Arena Kariya; Attendance: 2,400; Referees: Tomoto Shiro

15 December 2019; 13:00	Hisamitsu Springs	0–3	Denso Airybees	Adastria Arena, Mito; Attendance: 1,450; Referees: Kensuke Kuwahara
15 December 2019; 13:00	(12-25, 16-25, 20-25); Report A Report B			Adastria Arena, Mito; Attendance: 1,450; Referees: Kensuke Kuwahara

15 December 2019; 15:00	JT Marvelous	3–0	PFU BlueCats	Wing Arena Kariya; Attendance: 1,530; Referees: Yuka Kitamura
15 December 2019; 15:00	(25-18, 25-19, 25-20); Report A Report B			Wing Arena Kariya; Attendance: 1,530; Referees: Yuka Kitamura

15 December 2019; 15:00	Hitachi Rivale	3–2	Himeji Victorina	Adastria Arena, Mito; Attendance: 1,670; Referees: Mitsuko Masuoka
15 December 2019; 15:00	(20-25, 27-25, 26-24, 25-27, 15-11); Report A Report B			Adastria Arena, Mito; Attendance: 1,670; Referees: Mitsuko Masuoka

21 December 2019; 12:00	PFU BlueCats	0–3	Toyota Auto Body Queenseis	Ishikawa Sports Center, Kanazawa; Attendance: 714; Referees: Ken Nakayama
21 December 2019; 12:00	(18-25, 15-25, 17-25); Report A Report B			Ishikawa Sports Center, Kanazawa; Attendance: 714; Referees: Ken Nakayama

21 December 2019; 12:00	JT Marvelous	2–3	Saitama Ageo Medics	Beikomu Gymnasium, Amagasaki; Attendance: 1,900; Referees: Atsushi Hattori
21 December 2019; 12:00	(25-21, 25-18, 26-28, 22-25, 13-15); Report A Report B			Beikomu Gymnasium, Amagasaki; Attendance: 1,900; Referees: Atsushi Hattori

21 December 2019; 13:00	Okayama Seagulls	3–1	Hitachi Rivale	Zip Arena, Okayama; Attendance: 2,300; Referees: Toshie Aii
21 December 2019; 13:00	(25-15, 22-25, 25-23, 26-24); Report A Report B			Zip Arena, Okayama; Attendance: 2,300; Referees: Toshie Aii

21 December 2019; 15:25	Toray Arrows	3–1	Kurobe AquaFairies	Beikomu Gymnasium, Amagasaki; Attendance: 1,600; Referees: Mitsuko Masuoka
21 December 2019; 15:25	(20-25, 25-21, 33-31, 25-13); Report A Report B			Beikomu Gymnasium, Amagasaki; Attendance: 1,600; Referees: Mitsuko Masuoka

21 December 2019; 16:00	Denso Airybees	3–0	NEC Red Rockets	Zip Arena, Okayama; Attendance: 1,600; Referees: Kyoko Tanemoto
21 December 2019; 16:00	(25-17, 25-22, 25-16); Report A Report B			Zip Arena, Okayama; Attendance: 1,600; Referees: Kyoko Tanemoto

21 December 2019; 17:00	Hisamitsu Springs	3–0	Himeji Victorina	Kurume Arena; Attendance: 2,319; Referees: Hirokazu Tomita
21 December 2019; 17:00	(25-18, 25-23, 25-21); Report A Report B			Kurume Arena; Attendance: 2,319; Referees: Hirokazu Tomita

22 December 2019; 12:00	JT Marvelous	3–0	Kurobe AquaFairies	Beikomu Gymnasium, Amagasaki; Attendance: 1,800; Referees: Nobuko Sasaki
22 December 2019; 12:00	(25-19, 25-12, 25-17); Report A Report B			Beikomu Gymnasium, Amagasaki; Attendance: 1,800; Referees: Nobuko Sasaki

22 December 2019; 12:00	Okayama Seagulls	1–3	Denso Airybees	Zip Arena, Okayama; Attendance: 2,000; Referees: Yuka Kitamura
22 December 2019; 12:00	(18-25, 24-26, 25-19, 17-25); Report A Report B			Zip Arena, Okayama; Attendance: 2,000; Referees: Yuka Kitamura

22 December 2019; 15:00	Toray Arrows	0–3	Saitama Ageo Medics	Beikomu Gymnasium, Amagasaki; Attendance: 1,700; Referees: Eshita Takeshi
22 December 2019; 15:00	(23-25, 21-25, 20-25); Report A Report B			Beikomu Gymnasium, Amagasaki; Attendance: 1,700; Referees: Eshita Takeshi

22 December 2019; 15:00	NEC Red Rockets	3–0	Hitachi Rivale	Zip Arena, Okayama; Attendance: 1,600; Referees: Nana Yoshioka
22 December 2019; 15:00	(26-24, 28-26, 25-23); Report A Report B			Zip Arena, Okayama; Attendance: 1,600; Referees: Nana Yoshioka

28 December 2019; 11:00	Kurobe AquaFairies	0–3	PFU BlueCats	Kurobe General Sports Center; Attendance: 2,270; Referees: Nana Yoshioka
28 December 2019; 11:00	(20-25, 20-25, 17-25); Report A Report B			Kurobe General Sports Center; Attendance: 2,270; Referees: Nana Yoshioka

28 December 2019; 13:00	Himeji Victorina	1–3	NEC Red Rockets	Wink Gymnasium, Himeji; Attendance: 2,767; Referees: Hirokazu Tomita
28 December 2019; 13:00	(25-22, 22-25, 20-25, 13-25); Report A Report B			Wink Gymnasium, Himeji; Attendance: 2,767; Referees: Hirokazu Tomita

28 December 2019; 13:00	Hitachi Rivale	1–3	Denso Airybees	Hitachinaka City Gymnasium; Attendance: 1,333; Referees: Hiroaki Takahashi
28 December 2019; 13:00	(22-25, 20-25, 25-18, 20-25); Report A Report B			Hitachinaka City Gymnasium; Attendance: 1,333; Referees: Hiroaki Takahashi

28 December 2019; 13:30	JT Marvelous	3–2	Toray Arrows	Kurobe General Sports Center; Attendance: 2,700; Referees: Masato Ono
28 December 2019; 13:30	(25-20, 23-25, 25-18, 17-25, 15-12); Report A Report B			Kurobe General Sports Center; Attendance: 2,700; Referees: Masato Ono

28 December 2019; 16:00	Hisamitsu Springs	3–2	Okayama Seagulls	Wink Gymnasium, Himeji; Attendance: 1,700; Referees: Tomoto Shiro
28 December 2019; 16:00	(17-25, 28-26, 19-25, 25-22, 15-11); Report A Report B			Wink Gymnasium, Himeji; Attendance: 1,700; Referees: Tomoto Shiro

28 December 2019; 16:35	Toyota Auto Body Queenseis	3–1	Saitama Ageo Medics	Kurobe General Sports Center; Attendance: 2,800; Referees: Yutaka Moriguchi
28 December 2019; 16:35	(25-19, 25-21, 20-25, 25-22); Report A Report B			Kurobe General Sports Center; Attendance: 2,800; Referees: Yutaka Moriguchi

29 December 2019; 12:00	Kurobe AquaFairies	2–3	Toyota Auto Body Queenseis	Kurobe General Sports Center; Attendance: 1,600; Referees: Nobuko Sasaki
29 December 2019; 12:00	(26-24, 25-21, 14-25, 19-25, 13-15); Report A Report B			Kurobe General Sports Center; Attendance: 1,600; Referees: Nobuko Sasaki

29 December 2019; 13:05	Himeji Victorina	1–3	Okayama Seagulls	Wink Gymnasium, Himeji; Attendance: 3,249; Referees: Ryota Tsujito
29 December 2019; 13:05	(25-19, 20-25, 20-25, 16-25); Report A Report B			Wink Gymnasium, Himeji; Attendance: 3,249; Referees: Ryota Tsujito

29 December 2019; 15:15	Saitama Ageo Medics	3–0	PFU BlueCats	Kurobe General Sports Center; Attendance: 1,800; Referees: Ken Nakayama
29 December 2019; 15:15	(25-18, 25-18, 25-17); Report A Report B			Kurobe General Sports Center; Attendance: 1,800; Referees: Ken Nakayama

29 December 2019; 16:00	Hisamitsu Springs	3–0	NEC Red Rockets	Wink Gymnasium, Himeji; Attendance: 1,900; Referees: Ken Nishinakano
29 December 2019; 16:00	(25-17, 25-20, 25-21); Report A Report B			Wink Gymnasium, Himeji; Attendance: 1,900; Referees: Ken Nishinakano

=== Rescheduled Matches ===
04 January 2020; 12:00	Denso Airybees	3–1	Hisamitsu Springs	Okazaki Central Gymnasium; Attendance: 4,520; Referees: Kyoko Tanemoto
04 January 2020; 12:00	(25-27, 25-23, 25-9, 25-20); Report A Report B			Okazaki Central Gymnasium; Attendance: 4,520; Referees: Kyoko Tanemoto

04 January 2020; 14:00	Toray Arrows	3–0	Saitama Ageo Medics	YMIT Arena, Kusatsu; Attendance: 2,391; Referees: Ken Nishinakano
04 January 2020; 14:00	(28-26, 25-23, 25-22); Report A Report B			YMIT Arena, Kusatsu; Attendance: 2,391; Referees: Ken Nishinakano

04 January 2020; 15:00	NEC Red Rockets	1–3	Okayama Seagulls	Okazaki Central Gymnasium; Attendance: 3,750; Referees: Nobuko Sasaki
04 January 2020; 15:00	(20-25, 25-20, 18-25, 21-25); Report A Report B			Okazaki Central Gymnasium; Attendance: 3,750; Referees: Nobuko Sasaki

05 January 2020; 12:00	Denso Airybees	0–3	Okayama Seagulls	Okazaki Central Gymnasium; Attendance: 3,580; Referees: Hiroyuki Hara
05 January 2020; 12:00	(25-27, 22-25, 22-25); Report A Report B			Okazaki Central Gymnasium; Attendance: 3,580; Referees: Hiroyuki Hara

05 January 2020; 15:00	Hisamitsu Springs	0–3	NEC Red Rockets	Okazaki Central Gymnasium; Attendance: 3,120; Referees: Masato Ono
05 January 2020; 15:00	(21-25, 12-25, 19-25); Report A Report B			Okazaki Central Gymnasium; Attendance: 3,120; Referees: Masato Ono

== Regular Round Final Standing ==
Qualified for Final 8

Premier Conference
#	Team	Wins	Losses	Points	Sets W	Sets L	Sets Ratio	Points W	Points L	Points Ratio
1	Denso Airybees	18	3	51	55	20	2.75	1750	1518	1.15
2	Okayama Seagulls	15	6	45	50	27	1.85	1787	1594	1.12
3	NEC Red Rockets	11	10	33	35	35	1.00	1550	1584	0.98
4	Hisamitsu Springs	10	11	28	35	42	0.83	1669	1736	0.96
5	Hitachi Rivale	6	15	21	31	50	0.62	1763	1834	0.96
6	Himeji Victorina	3	18	11	18	54	0.33	1448	1717	0.84

Star Conference
#	Team	Wins	Losses	Points	Sets W	Sets L	Sets Ratio	Points W	Points L	Points Ratio
1	JT Marvelous	17	4	49	56	24	2.33	1836	1625	1.13
2	Toray Arrows	14	7	44	49	39	1.63	1814	1674	1.08
3	Toyota Auto Body Queenseis	14	7	37	46	37	1.24	1829	1750	1.05
4	Saitama Ageo Medics	13	8	39	48	30	1.60	1810	1693	1.07
5	PFU BlueCats	4	17	14	24	55	0.44	1597	1832	0.87
6	Kurobe AquaFairies	1	20	6	17	60	0.28	1539	1835	0.84

=== Regular Round Conference Champions ===
- Star Conference - JT Marvelous
- Premier Conference - Denso Airybees

== Final stage ==
=== Final 8 ===
Teams will receive advantage points based on their regular season performance and add the Final 8 results

- 1st place finisher from each Conference - 3 points
- 2nd place finisher from each Conference - 2 points
- 3rd place finisher from each Conference - 1 point
- 4th place finisher from each Conference - 0 points

There will be two groups for the Final 8

Group A

- Premier Conference 1st & 3rd place
- Star Conference 2nd & 4th place

Group B

- Star Conference 1st & 3rd place
- Premier Conference 2nd & 4th place

3 matches in each group (round robin) Top 2 teams from each group advance to semifinals. Points will determine final rank (different from Regular Round)

Tiebreakers for Final 8 (if tied on points)

1. Wins
2. Sets ratio
3. Points ratio

Qualified for Semifinals

Group A
#	Team	Points	Wins	Losses	Sets W	Sets L	Sets Ratio	Points W	Points L	Points Ratio
1	Denso Airybees	9	2	1	6	4	1.50	243	222	1.09
2	Saitama Ageo Medics	7	3	0	9	4	2.25	284	274	1.04
3	Toray Arrows	5	1	2	5	8	0.62	273	273	1.00
4	NEC Red Rockets	3	0	3	5	9	0.56	280	311	0.90

Final 8 Group A Round Robin

11 January 2020; 12:00	Denso Airybees	0–3	Saitama Ageo Medics	Saitama City Memorial Gymnasium; Attendance: 1,200; Referees: Kensuke Kuwahara
11 January 2020; 12:00	(23-25, 22-25, 26-28); Report A Report B			Saitama City Memorial Gymnasium; Attendance: 1,200; Referees: Kensuke Kuwahara

11 January 2020; 15:00	Toray Arrows	3–2	NEC Red Rockets	Saitama City Memorial Gymnasium; Attendance: 1,400; Referees: Nobuko Sasaki
11 January 2020; 15:00	(25-16, 23-25, 24-26, 25-19, 15-8); Report A Report B			Saitama City Memorial Gymnasium; Attendance: 1,400; Referees: Nobuko Sasaki

18 January 2020; 12:05	Denso Airybees	3–1	NEC Red Rockets	Funabashi Arena, Chiba; Attendance: 3,000; Referees: Hiroaki Takahashi
18 January 2020; 12:05	(20-25, 25-19, 25-17, 25-20); Report A Report B			Funabashi Arena, Chiba; Attendance: 3,000; Referees: Hiroaki Takahashi

18 January 2020; 15:00	Toray Arrows	2–3	Saitama Ageo Medics	Funabashi Arena, Chiba; Attendance: 3,100; Referees: Mitsuko Masuoka
18 January 2020; 15:00	(20-25, 25-16, 25-21, 20-25, 8-15); Report A Report B			Funabashi Arena, Chiba; Attendance: 3,100; Referees: Mitsuko Masuoka

19 January 2020; 12:00	Denso Airybees	3–0	Toray Arrows	Funabashi Arena, Chiba; Attendance: 2,500; Referees: Yuka Kitamura
19 January 2020; 12:00	(25-16, 27-25, 25-22); Report A Report B			Funabashi Arena, Chiba; Attendance: 2,500; Referees: Yuka Kitamura

19 January 2020; 15:00	NEC Red Rockets	2–3	Saitama Ageo Medics	Funabashi Arena, Chiba; Attendance: 2,600; Referees: Toshie Aii
19 January 2020; 15:00	(20-25, 25-16, 25-23, 23-25, 12-15); Report A Report B			Funabashi Arena, Chiba; Attendance: 2,600; Referees: Toshie Aii

Group B
#	Team	Points	Wins	Losses	Sets W	Sets L	Sets Ratio	Points W	Points L	Points Ratio
1	JT Marvelous	9	2	1	6	4	1.50	228	210	1.09
2	Okayama Seagulls	6	2	1	6	7	0.86	289	270	1.07
3	Toyota Auto Body Queenseis	6	1	2	7	6	1.17	274	276	0.99
4	Hisamitsu Springs	3	1	2	6	8	0.75	275	310	0.89

Final 8 Group B Round Robin

12 January 2020; 12:05	JT Marvelous	3–1	Hisamitsu Springs	Saitama City Memorial Gymnasium; Attendance: 1,500; Referees: Toshie Aii
12 January 2020; 12:05	(14-25, 25-12, 25-14, 25-19); Report A Report B			Saitama City Memorial Gymnasium; Attendance: 1,500; Referees: Toshie Aii

12 January 2020; 15:00	Okayama Seagulls	3–2	Toyota Auto Body Queenseis	Saitama City Memorial Gymnasium; Attendance: 1,300; Referees: Kyoko Tanemoto
12 January 2020; 15:00	(25-18, 22-25, 25-16, 23-25, 15-8); Report A Report B			Saitama City Memorial Gymnasium; Attendance: 1,300; Referees: Kyoko Tanemoto

18 January 2020; 12:00	JT Marvelous	0–3	Toyota Auto Body Queenseis	YMIT Arena, Kusatsu; Attendance: 2,370; Referees: Kyoko Tanemoto
18 January 2020; 12:00	(22-25, 21-25, 19-25); Report A Report B			YMIT Arena, Kusatsu; Attendance: 2,370; Referees: Kyoko Tanemoto

18 January 2020; 15:00	Okayama Seagulls	3–2	Hisamitsu Springs	YMIT Arena, Kusatsu; Attendance: 2,370; Referees: Sawa Itarudai
18 January 2020; 15:00	(29-31, 20-25, 25-12, 25-23, 15-10); Report A Report B			YMIT Arena, Kusatsu; Attendance: 2,370; Referees: Sawa Itarudai

19 January 2020; 12:00	JT Marvelous	3–0	Okayama Seagulls	YMIT Arena, Kusatsu; Attendance: 2,520; Referees: Kyoko Tanemoto
19 January 2020; 12:00	(25-23, 25-17, 27-25); Report A Report B			YMIT Arena, Kusatsu; Attendance: 2,520; Referees: Kyoko Tanemoto

19 January 2020; 15:00	Toyota Auto Body Queenseis	2–3	Hisamitsu Springs	YMIT Arena, Kusatsu; Attendance: 2,520; Referees: Nana Yoshioka
19 January 2020; 15:00	(25-16, 22-25, 26-28, 25-20, 9-15); Report A Report B			YMIT Arena, Kusatsu; Attendance: 2,520; Referees: Nana Yoshioka

=== Semi-final ===
25 January 2020; 12:00	Denso Airybees	2–3	Okayama Seagulls	Yoyogi National Gymnasium; Attendance: 2,667; Referees: Kyoko Tanemoto
25 January 2020; 12:00	(24-26, 14-25, 25-19, 25-23, 7-15); Report A Report B			Yoyogi National Gymnasium; Attendance: 2,667; Referees: Kyoko Tanemoto

25 January 2020; 14:30	JT Marvelous	3–0	Saitama Ageo Medics	Yoyogi National Gymnasium; Attendance: 4,370; Referees: Yuka Kitamura
25 January 2020; 14:30	(25-16 25-18 25-22); Report A Report B			Yoyogi National Gymnasium; Attendance: 4,370; Referees: Yuka Kitamura

=== 3rd-place match ===
26 January 2020; 12:00	Denso Airybees	0–3	Saitama Ageo Medics	Yoyogi National Gymnasium; Attendance: 2,435; Referees: Nobuko Sasaki
26 January 2020; 12:00	(22-25, 22-25, 20-25); Report A Report B			Yoyogi National Gymnasium; Attendance: 2,435; Referees: Nobuko Sasaki

=== Final ===
26 January 2020; 17:10	Okayama Seagulls	2–3	JT Marvelous	Yoyogi National Gymnasium; Attendance: 4,499; Referees: Kyoko Tanemoto
26 January 2020; 17:10	(22-25, 26-24, 25-23, 14-25, 7-15); Report A Report B			Yoyogi National Gymnasium; Attendance: 4,499; Referees: Kyoko Tanemoto

== Challenge 4 ==
The teams finishing 5th and 6th in their conference will be placed into the Challenge 4; 5th place teams receive 1 advantage point, 6th place teams receive zero.

A three team round robin takes place over three days. The top two teams stay in V1. The bottom two teams will playoff against V2 1st and 2nd place finishers in the V.Challenge Match:

- V1 11th vs. V2 2nd
- V1 12th vs. V2 1st

If the V2 team does not have an S1 license, they will not play the match.

Remain in V1

Challenge 4
#	Team	Points	Wins	Losses	Sets W	Sets L	Sets Ratio	Points W	Points L	Points Ratio
1	Hitachi Rivale	10	3	0	9	2	4.50	269	199	1.35
2	Kurobe AquaFairies	5	2	1	7	6	1.17	271	290	0.93
3	PFU BlueCats	4	1	2	5	8	0.62	263	289	0.91
4	Himeji Victorina	1	0	3	4	9	0.44	274	299	0.92

11 January 2020; 12:00	Hitachi Rivale	3–1	Kurobe AquaFairies	Tawarada Weng Memorial Gymnasium; Attendance: 623; Referees: Hirokazu Tomita
11 January 2020; 12:00	(25-8, 23-25, 25-15, 25-16); Report A Report B			Tawarada Weng Memorial Gymnasium; Attendance: 623; Referees: Hirokazu Tomita

11 January 2020; 15:00	PFU BlueCats	3–2	Himeji Victorina	Tawarada Weng Memorial Gymnasium; Attendance: 690; Referees: Nana Yoshioka
11 January 2020; 15:00	(25-21, 22-25, 25-22, 18-25, 15-12); Report A Report B			Tawarada Weng Memorial Gymnasium; Attendance: 690; Referees: Nana Yoshioka

12 January 2020; 12:00	Hitachi Rivale	3–1	Himeji Victorina	Tawarada Weng Memorial Gymnasium; Attendance: 1,223; Referees: Yuka Kitamura
12 January 2020; 12:00	(25-22, 25-16, 21-25, 25-18); Report A Report B			Tawarada Weng Memorial Gymnasium; Attendance: 1,223; Referees: Yuka Kitamura

12 January 2020; 15:00	PFU BlueCats	2–3	Kurobe AquaFairies	Tawarada Weng Memorial Gymnasium; Attendance: 1,309; Referees: Mitsuko Masuoka
12 January 2020; 15:00	(22-25, 27-25, 16-25, 25-18, 14-16); Report A Report B			Tawarada Weng Memorial Gymnasium; Attendance: 1,309; Referees: Mitsuko Masuoka

13 January 2020; 12:00	Hitachi Rivale	3–0	PFU BlueCats	Tawarada Weng Memorial Gymnasium; Attendance: 1,201; Referees: Yuka Kitamura
13 January 2020; 12:00	(25-14, 25-22, 25-18); Report A Report B			Tawarada Weng Memorial Gymnasium; Attendance: 1,201; Referees: Yuka Kitamura

13 January 2020; 15:00	Himeji Victorina	1–3	Kurobe AquaFairies	Tawarada Weng Memorial Gymnasium; Attendance: 1,306; Referees: Hirokazu Tomita
13 January 2020; 15:00	(18-25, 25-19, 27-29, 18-25); Report A Report B			Tawarada Weng Memorial Gymnasium; Attendance: 1,306; Referees: Hirokazu Tomita

=== V.Challenge Match ===
Held 22–23 February 2020

Participating teams: V1 11th and 12th place teams (3rd and 4th from the Challenge match); V2 1st and 2nd place teams

- V1 11th vs. V2 2nd
- V1 12th vs. V2 1st

If either of the V2 teams do not meet the 2020-21V.LEAGUE S1 license requirements, their prospective V.Challenge Match will not be held and the team will remain in V2 while the V1 team remains in V1.

There are no advantage points given. The matches will each be a two match series of 5 set matches (3,2,1,0 point system). The team with the highest number of wins will be the winner. If the teams split 1–1, Points will be the first tie-breaker

Points are awarded as follows:

- Win 3-0 or 3-1 = 3 points
- Victory in 3-2 = 2 points
- Defeat in 2-3 = 1 point
- Defeat in 0-3 or 1-3 = 0 points

Ranking method:

- Wins ->Points ->Set Percentage ->Scoring Rate

Qualified for V1 2020-2021

Challenge Match
#	Team	Points	Wins	Losses	Sets W	Sets L	Sets Ratio	Points W	Points L	Points Ratio
1	Himeji Victorina	6	2	0	6	0	-	156	119	1.31
2	Gunma Bank Green Wings (ja)	0	0	2	0	6	0.00	119	156	0.76

22 February 2020; 14:00	Himeji Victorina	3–0	Gunma Bank Green Wings (ja)	Sala Green Arena Hamakita Gymnasium; Attendance: 580; Referees: Ken Nakayama
22 February 2020; 14:00	(25–17, 25–16, 25–19); Report A Report B			Sala Green Arena Hamakita Gymnasium; Attendance: 580; Referees: Ken Nakayama

23 February 2020; 14:00	Himeji Victorina	3–0	Gunma Bank Green Wings (ja)	Sala Green Arena Hamakita Gymnasium; Attendance: 681; Referees: Hiroyuki Hara
23 February 2020; 14:00	(31-29, 25-18, 25-20); Report A Report B			Sala Green Arena Hamakita Gymnasium; Attendance: 681; Referees: Hiroyuki Hara

The Challenge Match between 11th place V1 finisher PFU BlueCats and 2nd place V2 finisher GSS Tokyo Sunbeams (ja) was not contested. The Sunbeams do not meet the V1 license requirements and remain in V.League Division 2. The BlueCats remain in V.League Division 1.

== Final standing ==
Rank	Club
1st place, gold medalist(s)	JT Marvelous
2nd place, silver medalist(s)	Okayama Seagulls
3rd place, bronze medalist(s)	Saitama Ageo Medics
4	Denso Airybees
5	Toyota Auto Body Queenseis
6	Toray Arrows
7	Hisamitsu Springs
8	NEC Red Rockets
9	Hitachi Rivale
10	Kurobe AquaFairies
11	PFU BlueCats
12	Himeji Victorina

Qualified for the 2021 Asian Women's Club Volleyball Championship

2019–20 V.League Division 1 Women's Champions
JT Marvelous

Team roster
Setter: Aki Momii, Mika Shibata, Misa Yamamoto, Misaki Tanaka

Libero: Mako Kobata, Tomoyo Fukagaya
MB: Aika Akutagawa, Anna Ogawa, Kaewkalaya Kamulthala, Risa Hashimoto, Sakura Kanda
OP: Andrea Drews
OH: Hickman Jahstice, Kotona Hayashi, Mizuki Tanaka, Yuka Meguro, Yuka Kutsui, Yuki Nishikawa

Head Coach: Tomoko Yoshihara

== Awards ==
=== Regular Round ===
- Best scorer
  - (Turkey) Neriman Ozsoy (Toyota Auto Body Queenseis) - 523 points
- Best spiker
  - (Trinidad and Tobago) Sinead Jack (Denso Airybees) - 52.9% success rate
- Best blocker
  - (United States) Hannah Tapp (Hitachi Rivale) - 1.08 blocks/set
- Best server
  - (United States) Andrea Drews (JT Marvelous) - 17.2% success rate
- Best receiver
  - (Japan) Risa Shinnabe (Hisamitsu Springs) - 68.8% positive efficiency

=== Final stage ===
- Most valuable player
  - (United States) Andrea Drews (JT Marvelous)
- Best outside hitters
  - (Turkey) Neriman Ozsoy (Toyota Auto Body Queenseis)
  - (Japan) Syuka Kaneda (ja) (Okayama Seagulls)
- Best Opposite
  - (United States) Andrea Drews (JT Marvelous)
- Best middle blockers
  - (Trinidad and Tobago) Sinead Jack (Denso Airybees)
  - (Japan) Erika Araki (Toyota Auto Body Queenseis)
- Best setter
  - (Japan) Aki Momii (JT Marvelous)
- Best libero
  - (Japan) Mako Kobata (JT Marvelous)
- Receive Award
  - (Japan) Kotoe Inoue (Denso Airybees)
- Best Newcomer Award
  - (Japan) Mayu Ishikawa (Toray Arrows)
- Fair play award
  - (Japan) Miwako Osanai (Hitachi Rivale)
- Excellent GM Award
  - (Japan) Akiyoshi Kawamoto (Okayama Seagulls)
- Director Award
  - (Japan) Tomoko Yoshihara (JT Marvelous)
- Matsudaira Yasutaka Award
  - (Japan) Tomoko Yoshihara (JT Marvelous)

== All Star Game ==
Due to the coronavirus the event was cancelled.

== See also ==
- 2018–19 V.League Division 1 Men's
