= List of indoor arenas in Japan =

The following is a list of indoor arenas in Japan with capacity for at least 4,000 spectators, most of the arenas in this list are for multi use purposes such as individual sports, team sports as well as cultural and political events.

== Currently in use ==
Location	Prefecture	Arena	Date built	Capacity	Image
Akita	Akita	Akita Prefectural Gymnasium	1968	6000	
Akita	Akita	CNA Arena	1994	5000	
Aomori	Aomori	Maeda Arena	2002	5500	
Chiba	Chiba	Port Arena	1991	7512	
Echizen	Fukui	Sun Dome Fukui	1995	10,000	
Fukuoka	Fukuoka	Marine Messe Fukuoka	1995	15,000	
Fukuoka	Fukuoka	Fukuoka City General Gymnasium	2018	5042	
Fukuroi	Shizuoka	Ecopa Arena	2001	10,000	
Funabashi	Chiba	Funabashi Arena	1993	4368	
Funabashi	Chiba	LaLa arena TOKYO-BAY	2024	10,000	
Ginowan	Okinawa	Okinawa Convention Center	1987	5000	
Hakodate	Hokkaido	Hakodate Arena	2015	5000	
Hamamatsu	Shizuoka	Hamamatsu Arena	1990	8000	
Hiroshima	Hiroshima	Hiroshima Prefectural Sports Center	1994	10,000	
Hiroshima	Hiroshima	Hiroshima Sun Plaza	1985	6052	
Ise	Mie	Sun Arena	1994	11,000	
Kagoshima	Kagoshima	Kagoshima Arena	1992	5700	
Kanazawa	Ishikawa	Ishikawa Sports Center	2008	5000	
Kawasaki	Kanagawa	Todoroki Arena	1995	6500	
Kobe	Hyogo	GLION Arena Kobe	2025	10,000	
Kobe	Hyogo	Kobe Green Arena	1993	6000	
Kobe	Hyogo	World Memorial Hall	1964	8000	
Koriyama	Fukushima	Koriyama General Gymnasium	1973	7056	
Koshigaya	Saitama	Koshigaya Municipal Gymnasium	1987	4472	
Kumamoto	Kumamoto	Kumamoto Prefectural Gymnasium	1982	4110	
Maebashi	Gunma	Yamada Green Dome	1990	20,000	
Matsumoto	Nagano	Matsumoto City Gymnasium	1991	6000	
Mito	Ibaraki	Adastria Mito Arena	2019	5000	
Morioka	Iwate	Morioka Takaya Arena	1989	5058	
Nagano	Nagano	M-Wave	1996	20,000	
Nagano	Nagano	Big Hat	1995	10,104	
Nagano	Nagano	White Ring	1996	7000	
Nagaoka	Niigata	City Hall Plaza Aore Nagaoka	2012	5100	
Nagoya	Aichi	Aichi Prefectural Gymnasium	1964	7514	
Nagoya	Aichi	IG Arena	2025	17,000	
Nagoya	Aichi	Nippon Gaishi Hall	1987	10,000	
Obihiro	Hokkaido	Obihiro City General Gymnasium	1972	2833	
Okayama	Okayama	Okayama General and Cultural Gymnasium	1982	8000	
Okayama	Okayama	Momotaro Arena	2005	11,000	
Okinawa	Okinawa	Okinawa Arena	2021	10,000	
Osaka	Osaka	Osaka Prefectural Gymnasium	1987	8000	
Osaka	Osaka	Fumin Kyosai Super Arena	1996	7056	
Osaka	Osaka	Towa Pharmaceutical Ractab Dome	1996	10,000	
Osaka	Osaka	Osaka Municipal Central Gymnasium	1996	8200	
Osaka	Osaka	Osaka-jō Hall	1983	16,000	
Ōta	Gunma	OPEN HOUSE ARENA OTA	2023	5000	
Otsu	Shiga	Ukaruchan Arena	1973	4896	
Otsu	Shiga	Shiga Arena	2022	5000	
Rifu	Miyagi	Sekisui Heim Super Arena	1997	7063	
Saga	Saga	Saga Arena	2023	8400	
Saitama	Saitama	Saitama Super Arena	2000	36,500	
Sapporo	Hokkaido	Hokkaido Prefectural Sports Center	1999	8000	
Sapporo	Hokkaido	Makomanai Ice Arena	1970	11,500	
Sendai	Miyagi	Kamei Arena	1984	7000	
Sendai	Miyagi	Xebio Arena	2012	4002	
Tokorozawa	Saitama	Tokorozawa Municipal Gymnasium	2004	4308	
Tokushima	Tokushima	Asty Tokushima	1993	5000	
Tokyo	Tokyo	Ariake Arena	2020	15,000	
Tokyo	Tokyo	Ariake Coliseum	1987	10,000	
Tokyo	Tokyo	Musashino Forest Sport Plaza	2017	10,000	
Tokyo	Tokyo	Nippon Budokan	1964	14,471	
Tokyo	Tokyo	Ota City General Gymnasium	2013	4012	
Tokyo	Tokyo	Ryōgoku Sumo Hall	1985	11,098	
Tokyo	Tokyo	Tokyo Metropolitan Gymnasium	1954	10,000	
Tokyo	Tokyo	Toyota Arena Tokyo	2025	10,000	
Tokyo	Tokyo	Yoyogi National Gymnasium	1964	13,291	
Tomakomai	Hokkaido	Hakucho Arena	1996	4015	
Toyama	Toyama	Toyama City Gymnasium	1999	5000	
Yokkaichi	Mie	Yokkaichi Dome	1997	4704	
Yokohama	Kanagawa	Yokohama Arena	1989	17,010	
Yokohama	Kanagawa	Yokohama International Swimming Pool	1998	4000	
Yokohama	Kanagawa	Yokohama Budokan	2020	3000	
Yokohama	Kanagawa	Pia Arena MM	2020	12,141	
Yokohama	Kanagawa	K-Arena Yokohama	2023	20,000	

== Under construction ==
Arenas	Capacity	City	Status	Planned opening year
Nagoya Arena	10,000	Nagoya	Under construction	2027

== See also ==
- List of football stadiums in Japan
- List of indoor arenas by capacity
