= Aki Momii =

Japanese volleyball player (born 2000)

Personal information
- Born: 7 October 2000 (age 26) Sagamihara, Kanagawa, Japan
- Height: 1.76 m (5 ft 9 in)
- Weight: 65 kg (143 lb)
- Spike: 285 cm (112 in)
- Block: 278 cm (109 in)

Volleyball information
- Position: Setter
- Current club: (Japan) Hisamitsu Springs
- Number: 12 (national team); 19 (club)

Career
- Years: Team
- 2018–2024: JT Marvelous
- 2024–2025: AEK Athens
- 2025–: Hisamitsu Springs

National team
- Years: Team
- 2021–present: Japan

Aki Momii (籾井あき, Momii Aki; born 7 October 2000) is a Japanese volleyball player. She plays Japan women's national volleyball team. She competed at the 2020 Summer Olympics, in Women's volleyball.

== Early life ==
Momii was born in Sagamihara, Kanagawa Prefecture. Her father is Peruvian-Spanish, while her mother is Peruvian-Japanese. Momii is a Peruvian citizen until high school.

When she was in elementary school, there was a volleyball team near her house, then she started playing volleyball when she was invited by a friend. Momii joined JT Marvelous after graduating from Hachioji Middle School in February 2019.

In 2021, she was selected to the Japanese national team for the first time in the Olympics.

In May 2024, Momii joined AEK Athens in Greece.

In May 2025, it was announced that she will return to Japan, joining Hisamitsu Springs.
