= Kakogawa Municipal General Gymnasium =

Arena in Kakogawa, Hyogo, Japan

Coordinates: 34°48′29.8″N 134°49′22″E

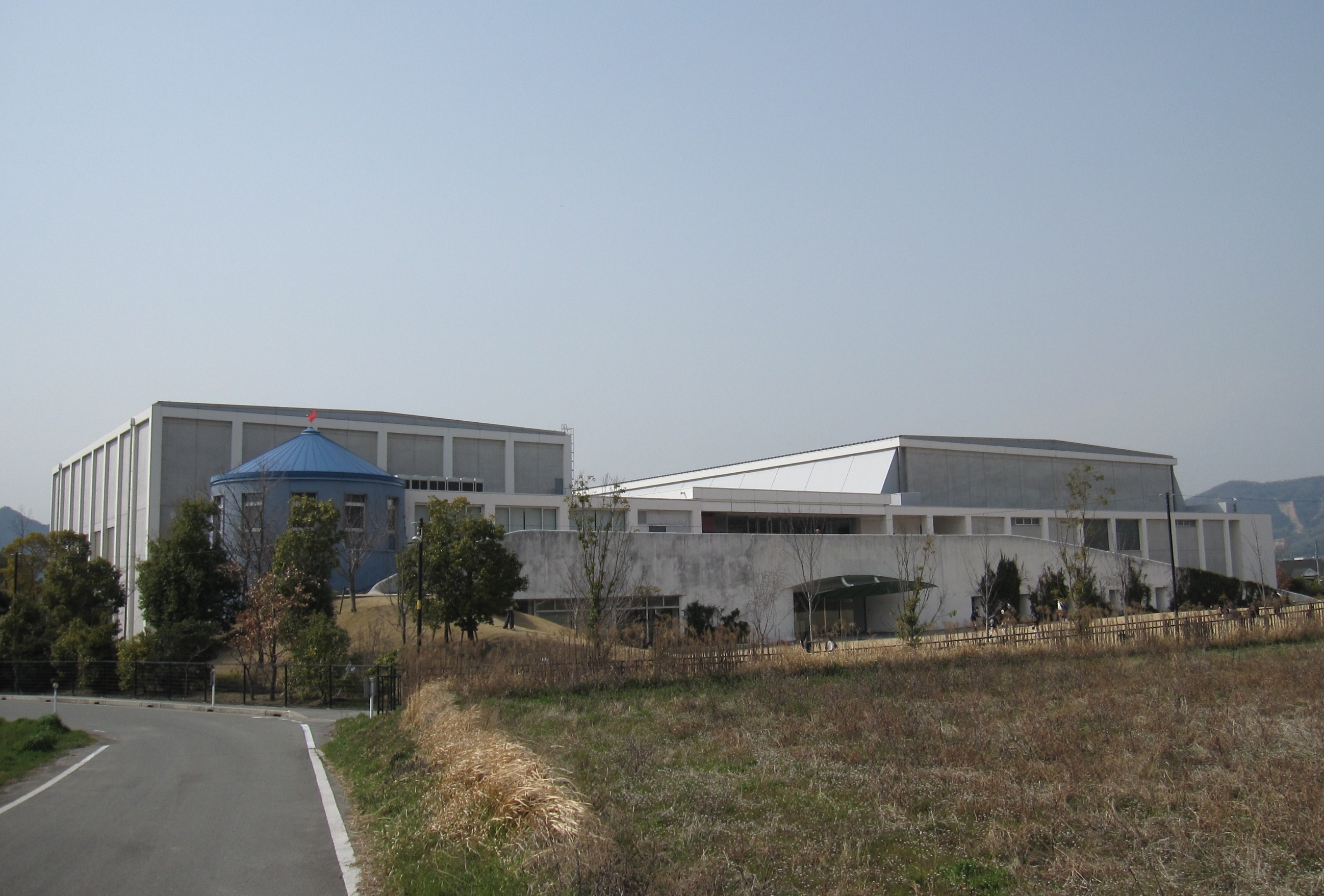
- Interactive map of Kakogawa Municipal General Gymnasium
- Full name: Kakogawa Municipal General Gymnasium
- Location: Kakogawa, Hyogo, Japan
- Owner: Kakogawa city
- Operator: Kakogawa Sports Park Service
- Capacity: 1,800
- Parking: 500 spaces

Construction
- Opened: April 2005
- Cost
- Architect: Kajima
- Main contractor: Kajima

Website
- http://www.kakogawa-sports.join-us.jp/arena/facility.html

Kakogawa Municipal General Gymnasium is an arena in Kakogawa, Hyogo, Japan.

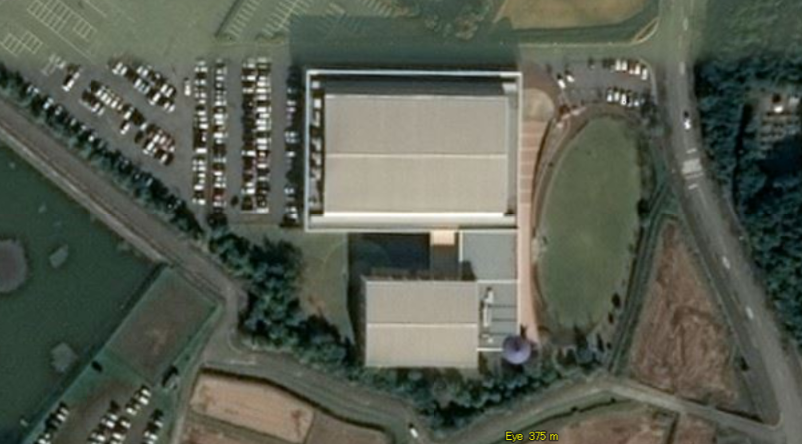
Satellite view
