= Saneiwork Sumiyoshi Sports Center =

Arena in Sumiyoshi-ku, Osaka, Japan

Coordinates: 34°35′31.7″N 135°30′41.3″E

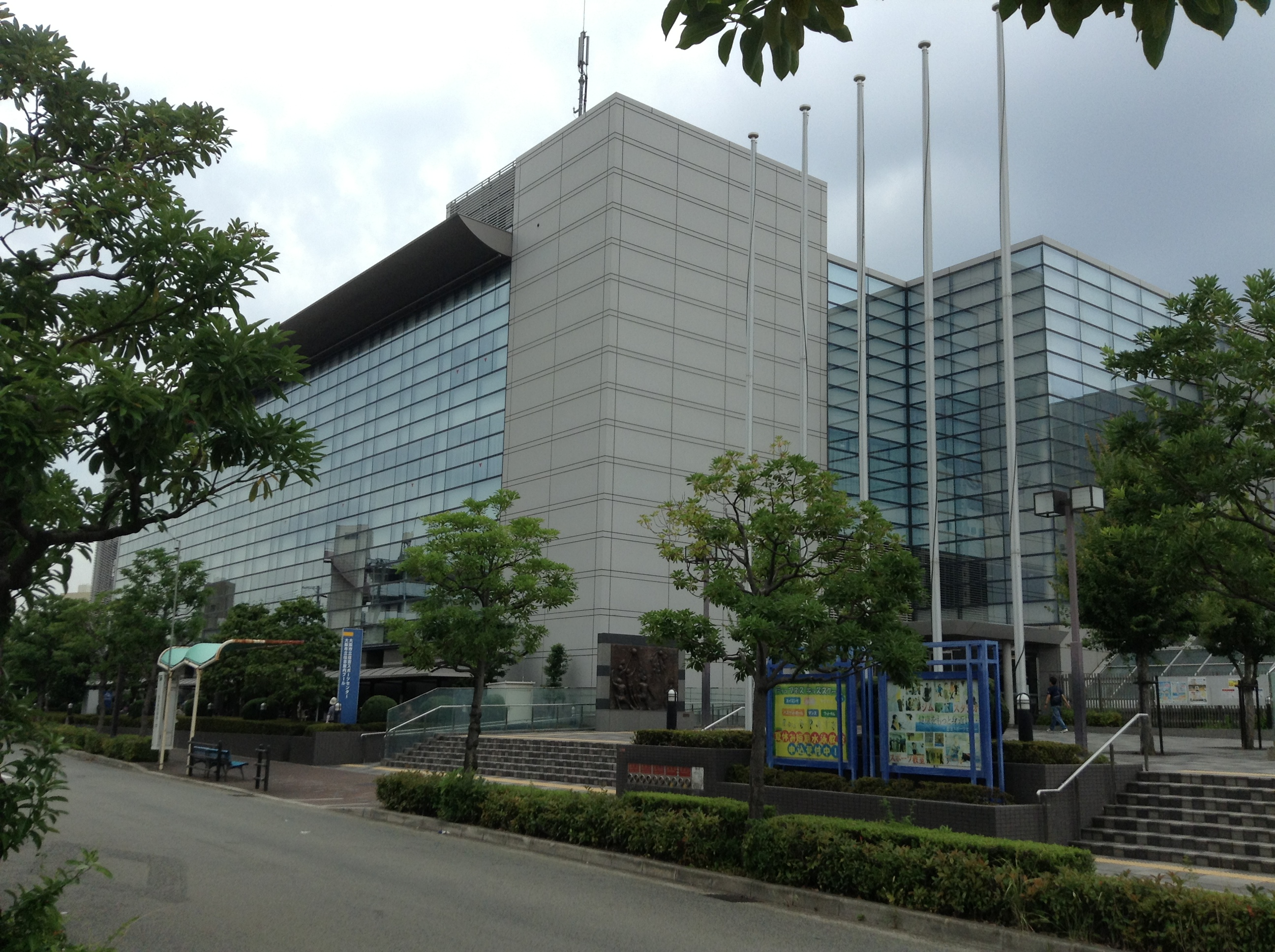
- Interactive map of Saneiwork Sumiyoshi Sports Center
- Full name: Sumiyoshi Sports Center
- Location: Sumiyoshi-ku, Osaka, Japan
- Operator: Tipness Limited
- Capacity: 3,500

Construction
- Opened: June 2000
- Cost

Tenant
- Osaka Evessa (2010-2015)

Website
- http://sumispo.jp/

Saneiwork Sumiyoshi Sports Center is an arena in Sumiyoshi-ku, Osaka, Japan. It is the former home arena of the Osaka Evessa of the B.League, Japan's professional basketball league.

== Facilities ==
- No.1 Gymnasium 1850 m^{2} 50.9m×36.3m
- No.2 Gymnasium 670 m^{2} 35.1m×19.0m
- Indoor swimming pool 25m×8 courses

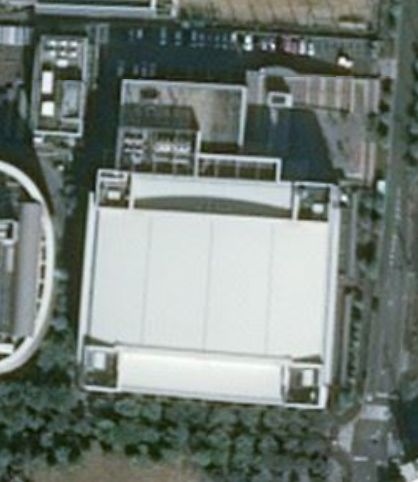
Satellite view
