= Hinata Shigihara =

Japanese volleyball player (born 2001)

Personal information
- Nationality: Japanese
- Born: February 25, 2001 (age 25) Nihonmatsu, Fukushima, Japan
- Height: 175 cm (5 ft 9 in)

Volleyball information
- Position: Outside hitter
- Current club: Aleeza Aichi

Career
- Years: Team
- 2019–: Toyota Auto Body Queenseis / Aleeza Aichi

National team
- Years: Team
- 2018–2019: Japan junior
- 2026–: Japan
Honours
Women's volleyball
Representing Japan
Asian Games
Silver medal – second place	2026 Aichi–Nagoya	Team

Hinata Shigihara (Japanese: 鴫原 ひなた, born 25 February 2001) is a Japanese professional volleyball player who plays as an outside hitter for Aleeza Aichi and the Japan women's national volleyball team. She began her professional career with Toyota Auto Body Queenseis after graduating from Furukawa Gakuen High School. In 2026, she made her senior international debut and won a silver medal with Japan at the 2026 Asian Games.

== Early life and education ==
Shigihara was born in Nihonmatsu, Fukushima, Japan. She began playing volleyball in the third grade of elementary school after a friend invited her to join the sport. She played for her local school team before joining the volleyball programme at Furukawa Gakuen High School in Osaki, Miyagi.

During her junior career, Shigihara represented Fukushima at the 2016 JOC Junior Olympic Cup National Prefectural Junior High School Volleyball Championship. She was selected as one of the tournament's outstanding players. At Furukawa Gakuen, she competed in national high school tournaments and developed into an outside hitter.

== Club career ==
After graduating from Furukawa Gakuen High School in 2019, Shigihara joined Toyota Auto Body Queenseis, a professional women's volleyball club in Japan. She made her debut during the 2019–20 season and continued to play for the club as it competed in Japan's top domestic league.

Shigihara established herself as an outside hitter, contributing in both attack and reception. She also served as the team's captain beginning with the 2023–24 season. During the 2024–25 SV.League season, she appeared in 44 regular-season matches for Queenseis Kariya and scored 486 attack points, along with 47 block points and 32 service aces.

During the 2025–26 SV.League season, Shigihara recorded 551 attack points and 619 total points in 46 appearances, according to the league's player statistics. The club subsequently became known as Aleeza Aichi, and she continued with the team under its new identity.

== International career ==
=== Junior national team ===
Shigihara represented Japan in junior international volleyball. In 2018, she was associated with Japan's under-19 programme, and in 2019 she was selected for the Japan squad at the Asian Junior Women's Volleyball Championship. She also received the Fresh Star Award at the 2019 V Summer League West Division tournament.

=== Senior national team ===
In 2026, Shigihara received her first selection for Japan's senior women's national team. She competed in the 2026 Asian Women's Volleyball Championship and the 2026 FIVB Volleyball Women's Nations League. Her selection recognised her performances in the domestic league, where she had developed into an established outside hitter.

Shigihara was selected for Japan's women's volleyball team at the 2026 Asian Games in Aichi–Nagoya. Japan advanced to the final after defeating South Korea in the semifinal. The team finished with the silver medal after losing to China in the final.
