= Green Arena =

Arena in Hamamatsu, Shizuoka, Japan

Coordinates: 34°47′53.2″N 137°45′29.7″E

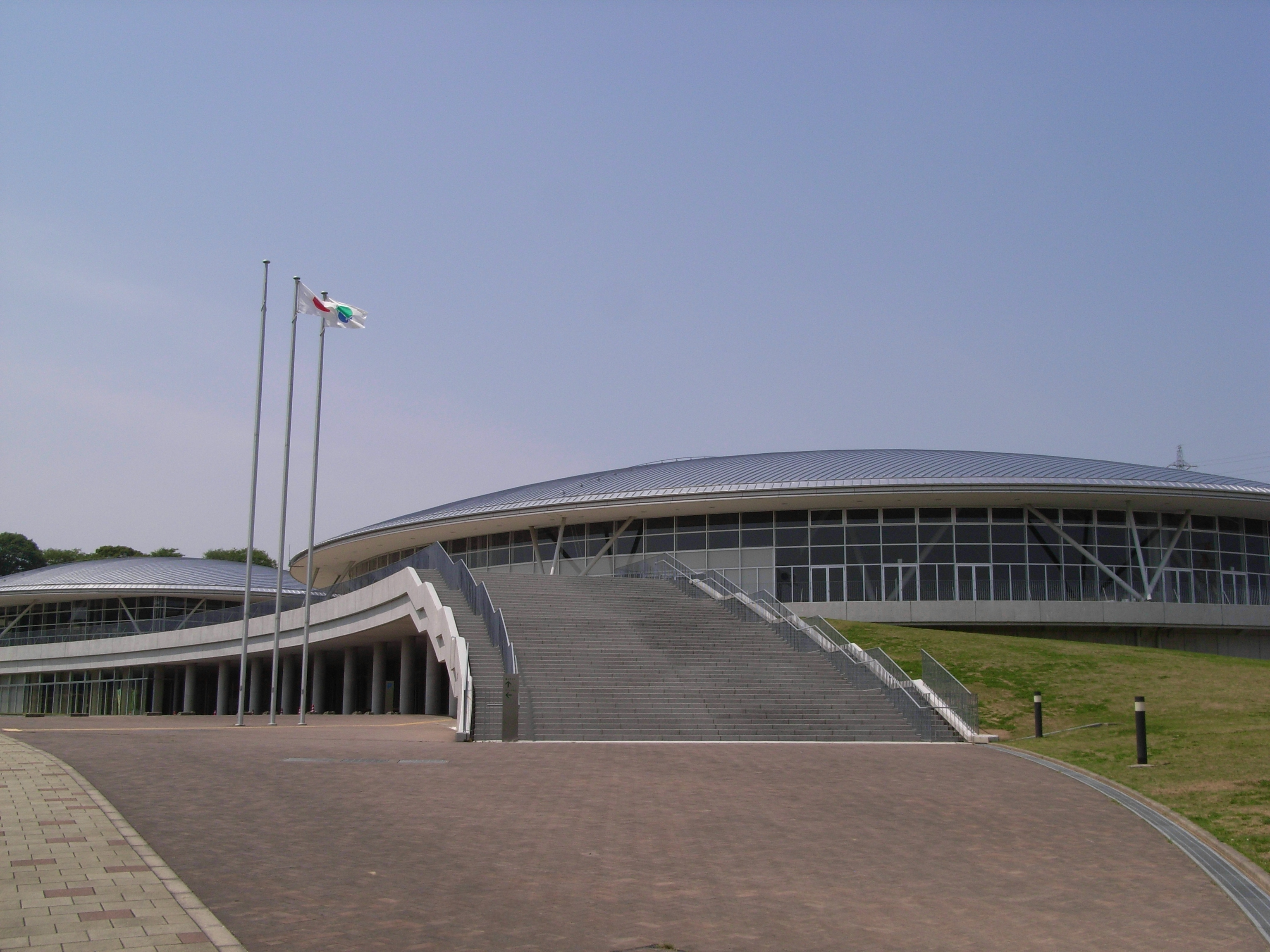
- Interactive map of Green Arena
- Full name: Hamamatsu City Hamakita General Gymnasium
- Location: Hamana Ward, Hamamatsu, Japan
- Owner: Hamamatsu city
- Operator: Hamamatsu city
- Capacity: 1,070
- Parking: 300

Construction
- Opened: 2002
- Cost

Green Arena is an arena in Hamamatsu, Shizuoka, Japan.

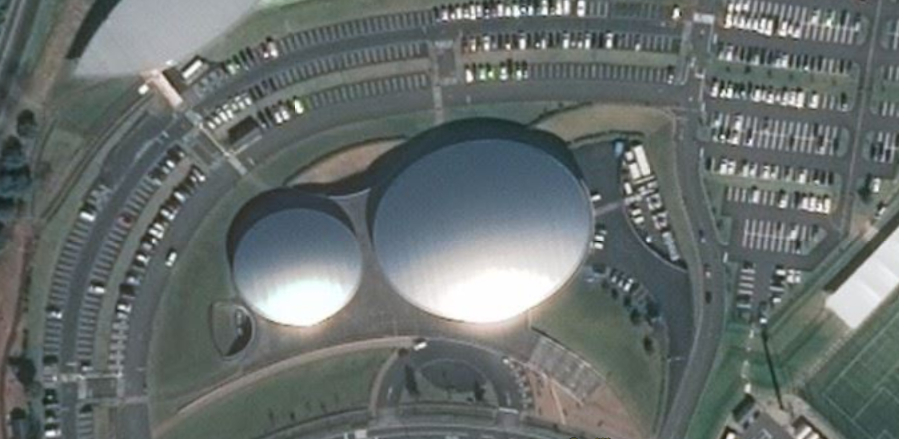
Satellite view
