= Adastria Mito Arena =

Indoor arena in Mito, Ibaraki, Japan

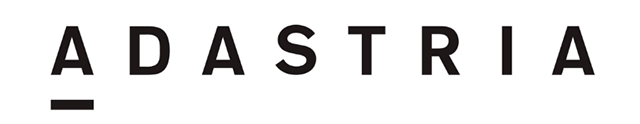

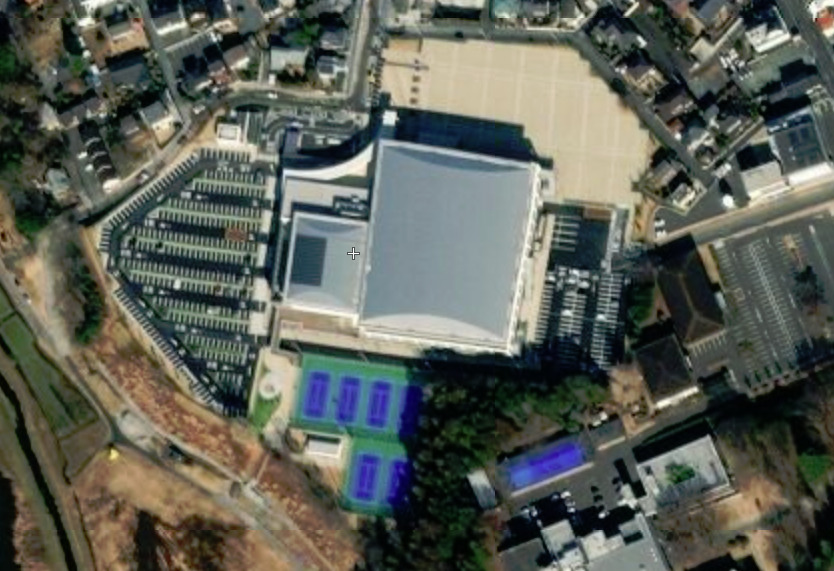

- Location within Ibaraki Prefecture Location within Japan
- Interactive map of Adastria Mito Arena
- Full name: Azumatyo Sports Park New Gymnasium
- Location: Mito, Ibaraki, Japan
- Coordinates: 36°22′49.7″N 140°26′55.2″E
- Owner: Mito city
- Operator: Mito city
- Capacity: 5,000
- Parking: 603 spaces

Construction
- Opened: April 2019
- Cost: JPY 9.95 billion
- Main contractor: Shimizu Corporation

Tenant
- Cyberdyne Ibaraki Robots

Website
- Official page

Adastria Mito Arena (アダストリアみとアリーナ) is a multi-use indoor arena in Mito, Ibaraki, Japan. It is the largest basketball court in the Prefecture.

== History ==
The former arena, Ibaraki Prefectural Sports Center Arena built in 1963 was closed at August 31st, 2015 because of its deterioration. At the next day, the sports park was transferred from Ibaraki Prefecture to Mito City, and a new arena was built at the same place. In October 2018 Mito-originated Adastria Co., Ltd. purchased the naming rights, and the name was changed to Adastria Mito Arena.

== Facilities ==
- Main arena - 3,255sqm, 69m×46m×15m
- Sub arena - 997sqm, 38m×25m×12.5m

== Attendance records ==
The record for a basketball game is 5,041, set on April 6, 2019, when the Gunma Crane Thunders defeated the Ibaraki Robots.

== See also ==
- List of indoor arenas in Japan
