= Ishikawa Sports Center =

Indoor arena in Kanazawa, Ishikawa, Japan

- いしかわ総合スポーツセンター
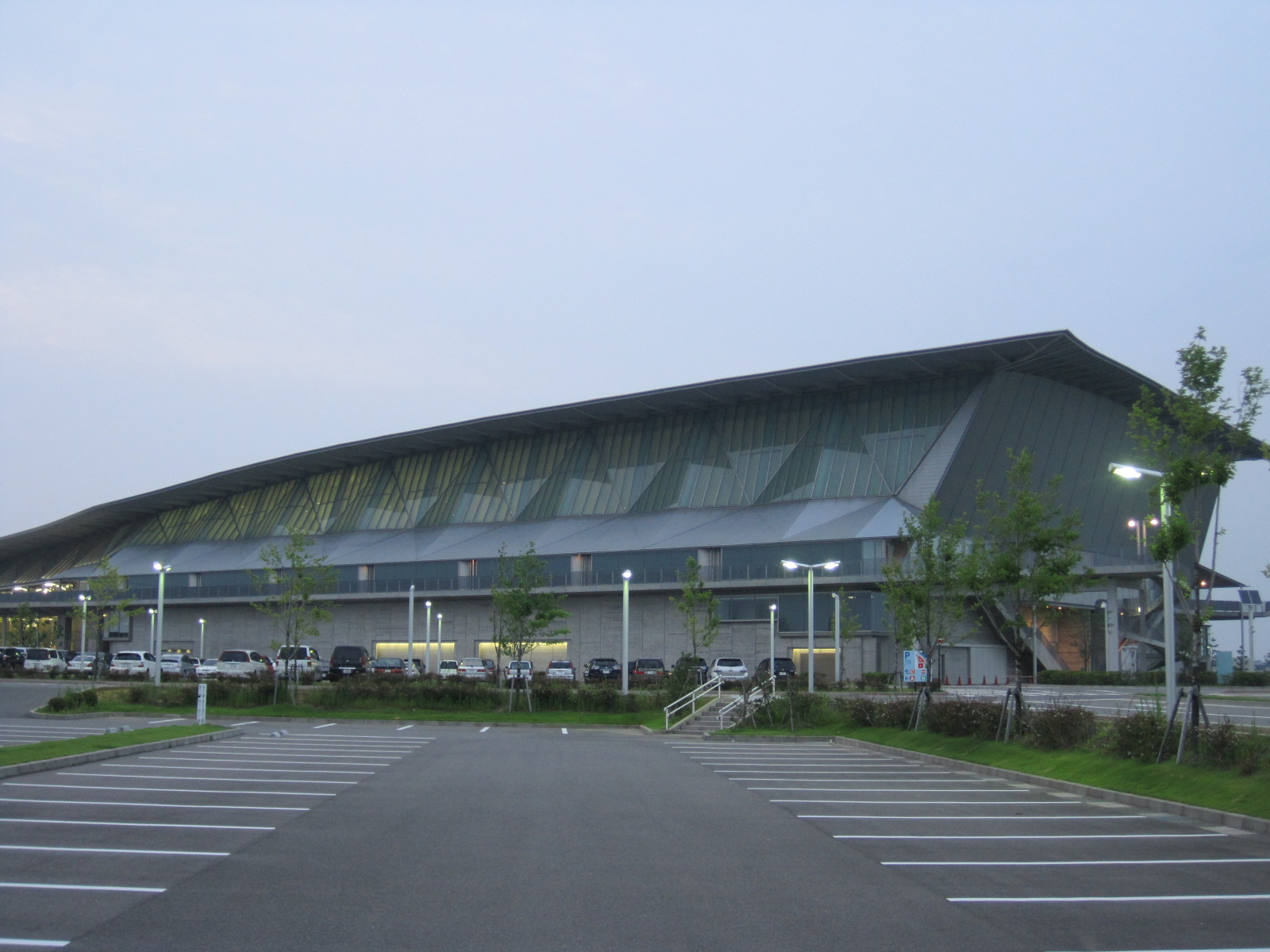

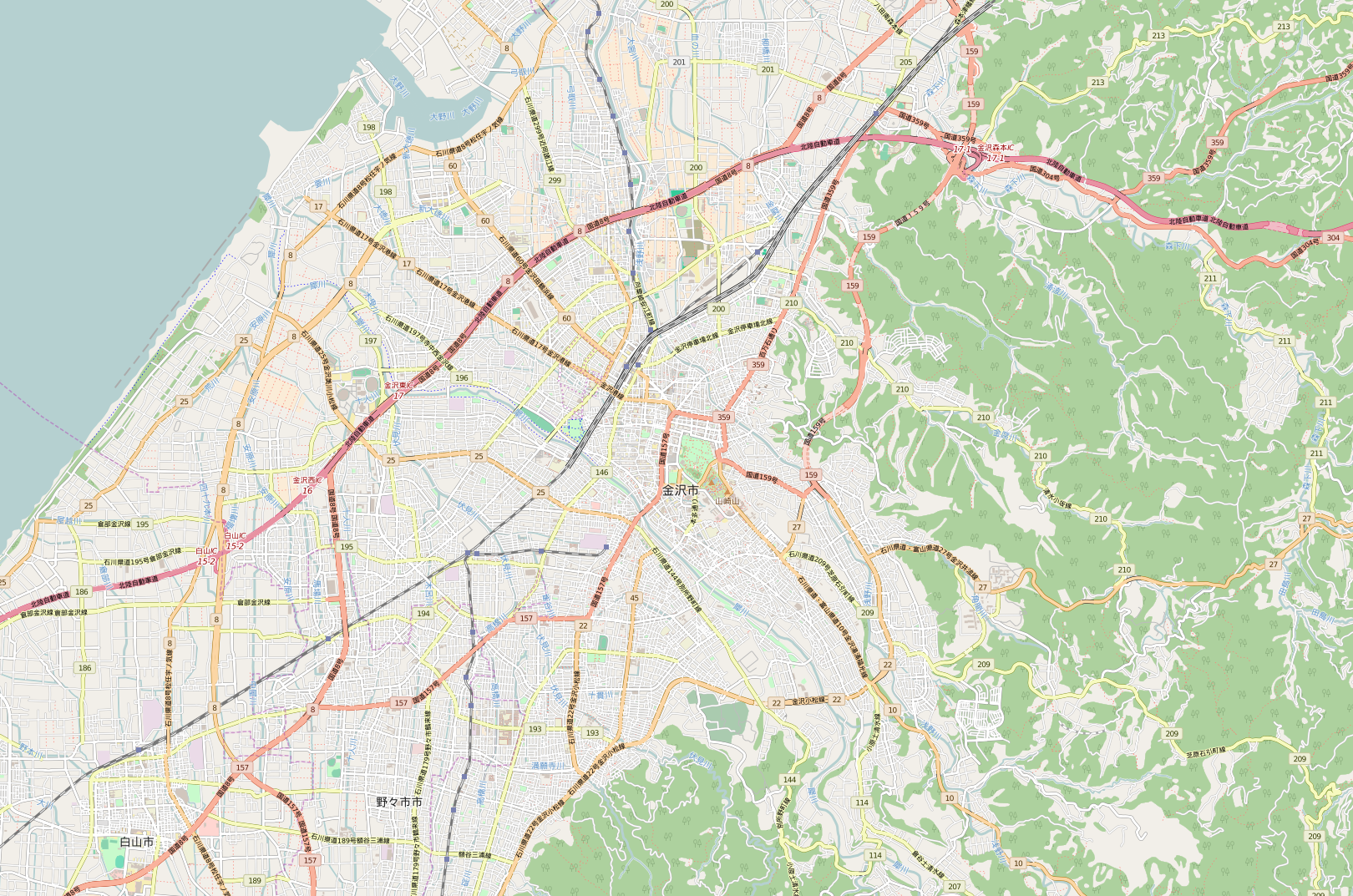
- Location within Kanazawa, Ishikawa Location within Ishikawa Prefecture Location within Japan
- Interactive map of Ishikawa Sports Center
- Location: Kanazawa, Ishikawa, Japan
- Coordinates: 36.5793678°N 136.598382°E
- Owner: Ishikawa Prefecture
- Operator: Ishikawa Prefectural Sports Association
- Capacity: 5,000

Construction
- Opened: March 2008

Ishikawa Sports Center (いしかわ総合スポーツセンター, Ishikawa sogo supo-tsu senta-) is a multi-purpose indoor arena in the city of Kanazawa, Japan. The capacity of the arena is 5,000 and was opened in March 2008.
