= Funabashi Arena =

Arena in Funabashi, Japan

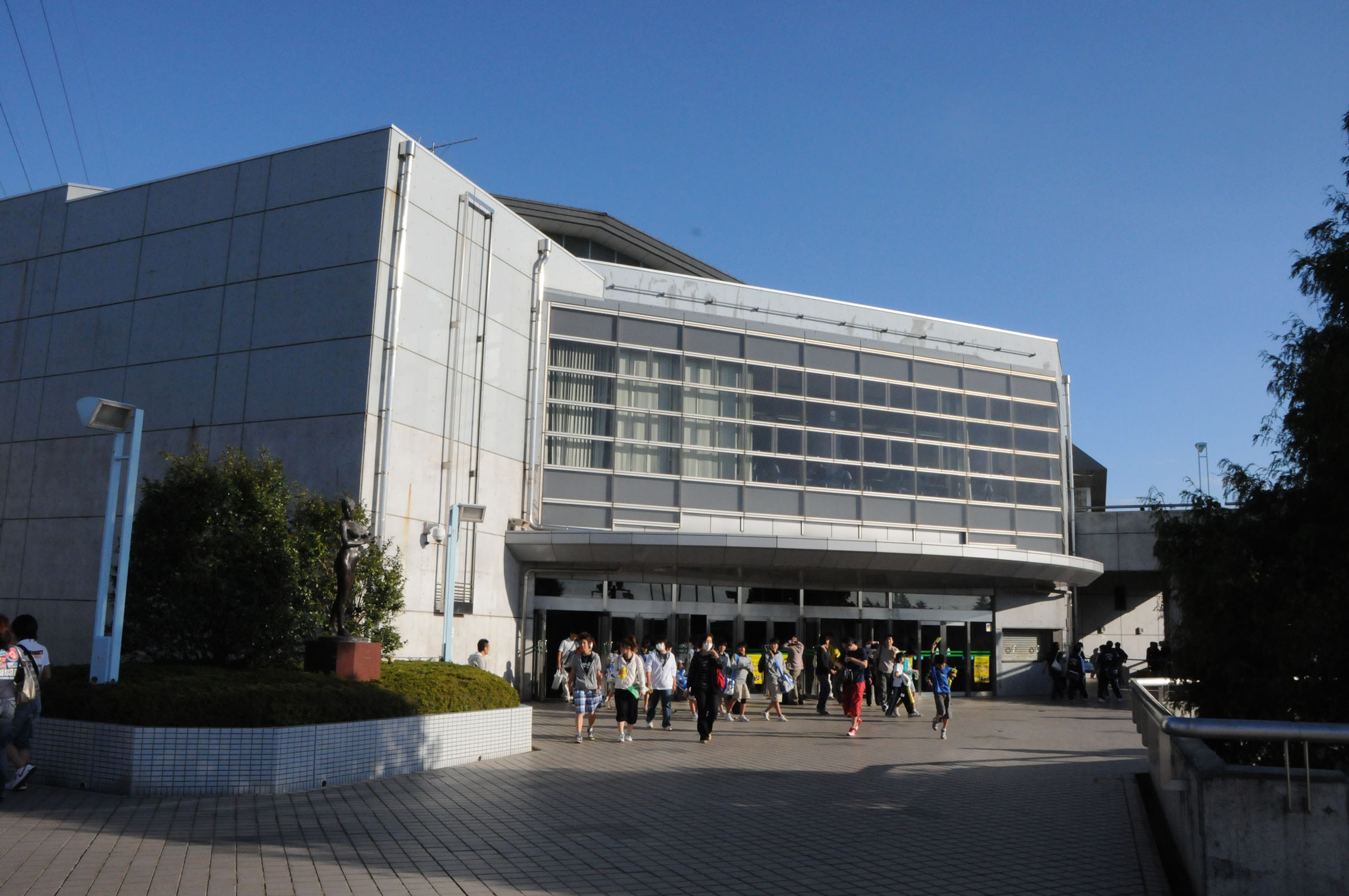

- Location within Chiba Prefecture Location within Japan
- Interactive map of Funabashi Arena
- Full name: Funabashi City General Gymnasium
- Location: Funabashi, Chiba, Japan
- Coordinates: 35°43′46″N 140°03′07″E
- Owner: Funabashi city
- Operator: Funabashi Culture Sports Public Corporations
- Capacity: 4,368
- Scoreboard: Diamond Vision scoreboards

Construction
- Opened: 1993
- Cost

Tenant
- Chiba Jets Funabashi

Website
- http://www.f-bunspo.or.jp/arena/

Funabashi Arena is an arena in Funabashi, Chiba, Japan. It is the home arena of the Chiba Jets Funabashi of the B.League, Japan's professional basketball league.

== Facilities ==
- Main arena -2,357.94m^{2} - 39m × 60.46m × 15m
- Sub arena - 839.12m^{2} - 24.50m × 34.25m × 12.50m
- Babies playroom - 67.02m^{2}
- Swimming pool - 25m × 6 courses
- Multi purpose room - 519.87m^{2}
- Table tennis room - 218.43m^{2}
- Archery field - 127.13m^{2}
- Training room - 388.48m^{2}

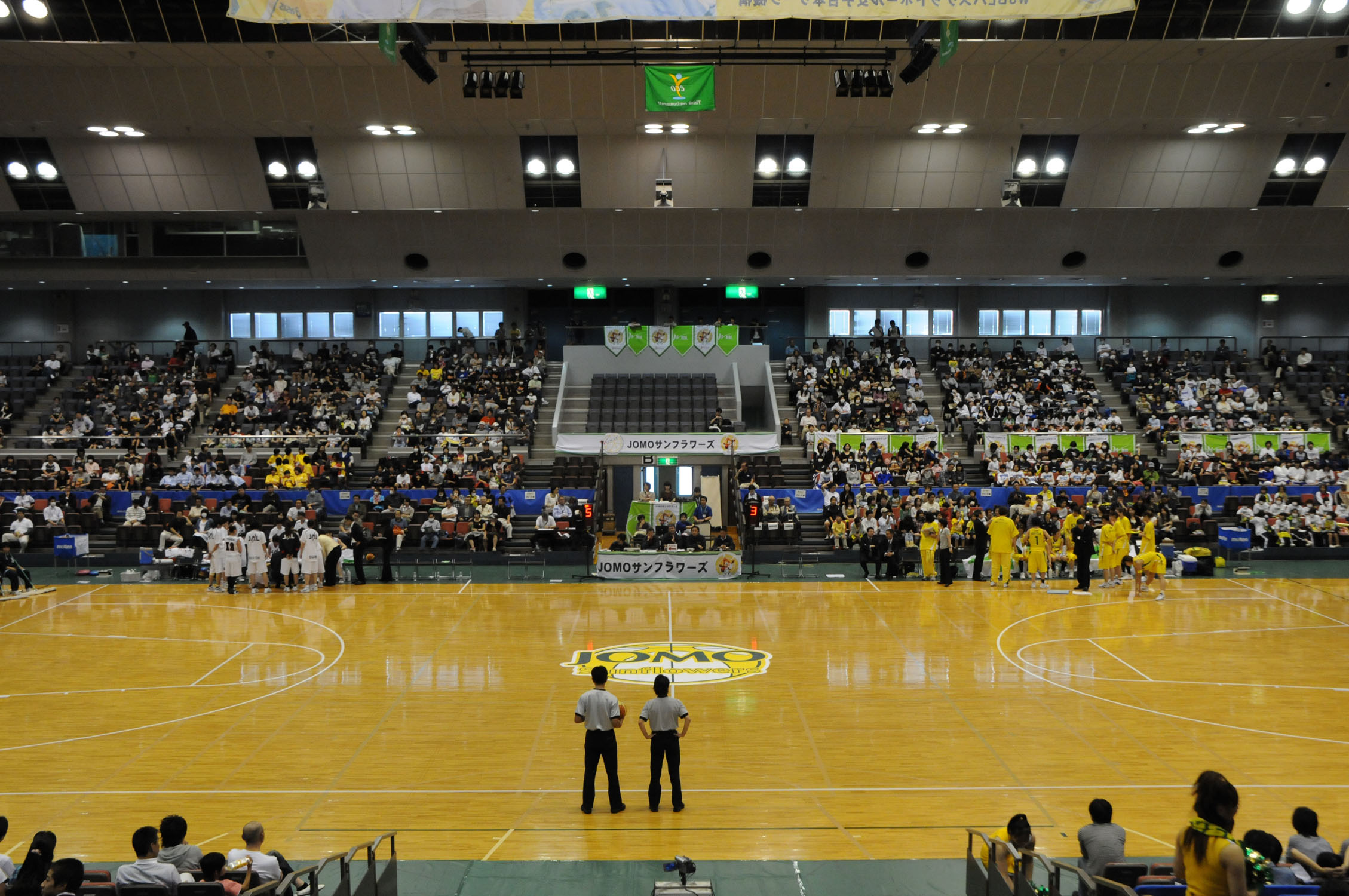
Arena

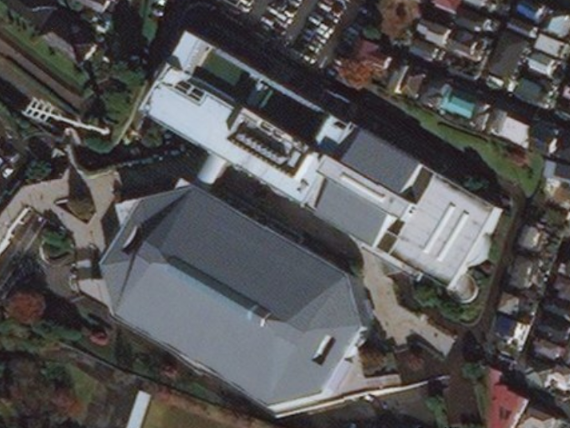
Satellite view
