= Kawasaki City Todoroki Arena =

Indoor arena in Kawasaki, Japan

Coordinates: 35.587287°N 139.647357°E

Todoroki Arena

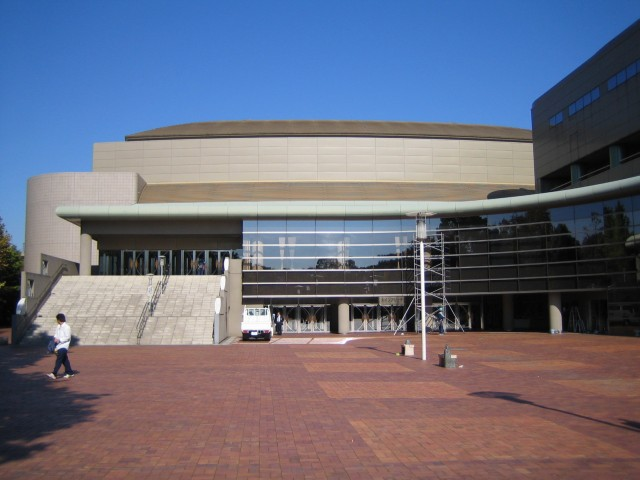
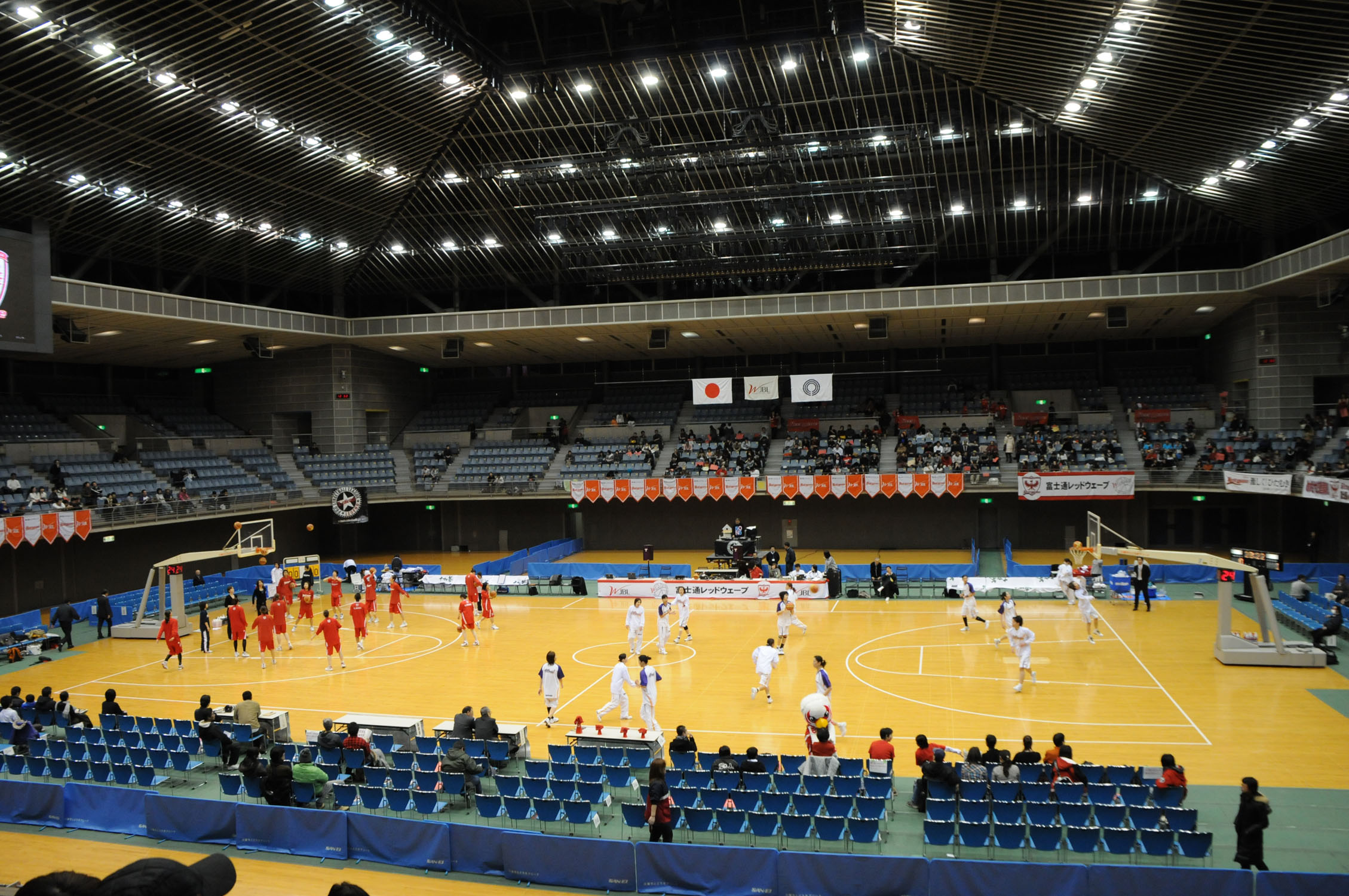

- Location within Kanagawa Prefecture Location within Japan
- Interactive map of Todoroki Arena
- Location: Kawasaki, Kanagawa, Japan
- Owner: City of Kawasaki
- Operator: Todoroki Sports & Culture Partners
- Capacity: 6,500

Construction
- Opened: August 1995
- Architect: Yamashita Sekkei
- Main contractor: Obayashi Corporation

Tenants
- Kawasaki Brave Thunders; Fujitsu Red Wave; NEC Red Rockets

Website
- http://todoroki-arena.com/

Kawasaki City Todoroki Arena, also known as Tokyu Dresser Todoroki Arena, is a multi-purpose indoor arena in the Todoroki Park in Kawasaki, Kanagawa, Japan, with a capacity of 6,500.

It is the home arena for the Kawasaki Brave Thunders men's basketball team, the Fujitsu Red Wave women's basketball team, and the NEC Red Rockets women's volleyball team.

It is divided into a main arena used for sports matches, concerts, and other major events, and a sub-arena open to the public for practice and exercise.

== History ==
The arena opened in 1995.

It was temporarily converted to a shelter for victims of the 2011 Tohoku earthquake and tsunami, housing up to 112 evacuees between March and July 2011.

Tokyu Corporation purchased the naming rights for the arena for the 2025-28 period for an annual sponsorship fee of JPY 15 million.

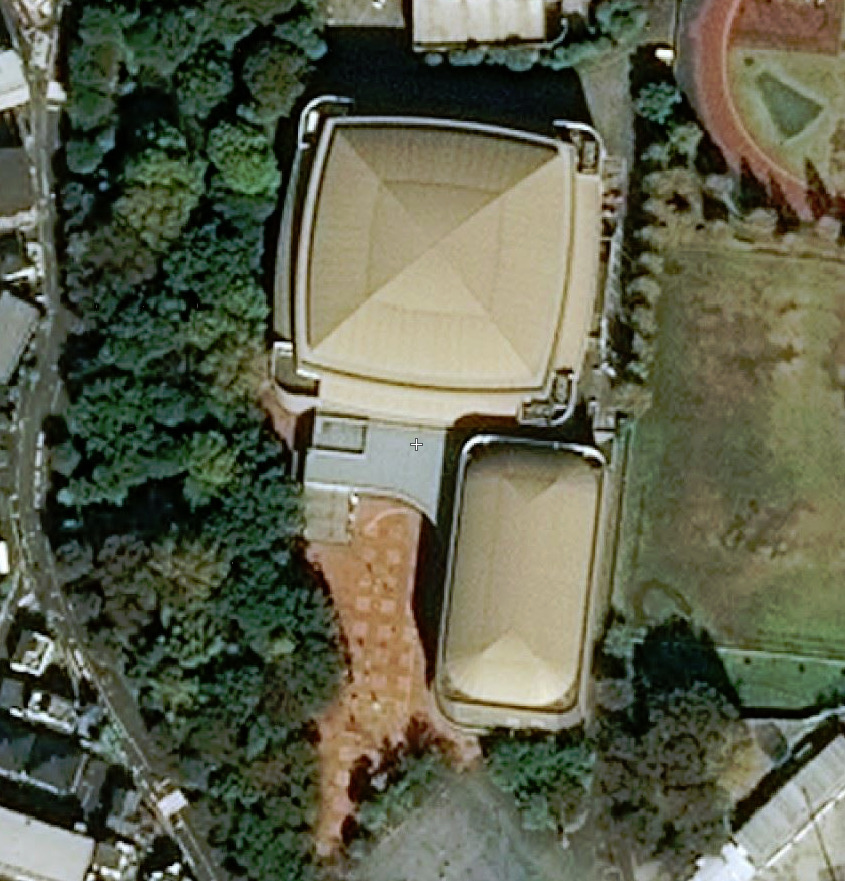
Satellite view

== Location ==
The closest stations to the arena are Musashi-Nakahara Station on the Nambu Line and Shin-maruko Station on the Toyoko Line and Meguro Line.

The arena is adjacent to Todoroki Athletics Stadium, an outdoor stadium that is home to the Kawasaki Frontale men's soccer team.
