= Horaiya Koriyama General Gymnasium =

Arena in Kōriyama, Fukushima, Japan

Kōriyama General Gymnasium

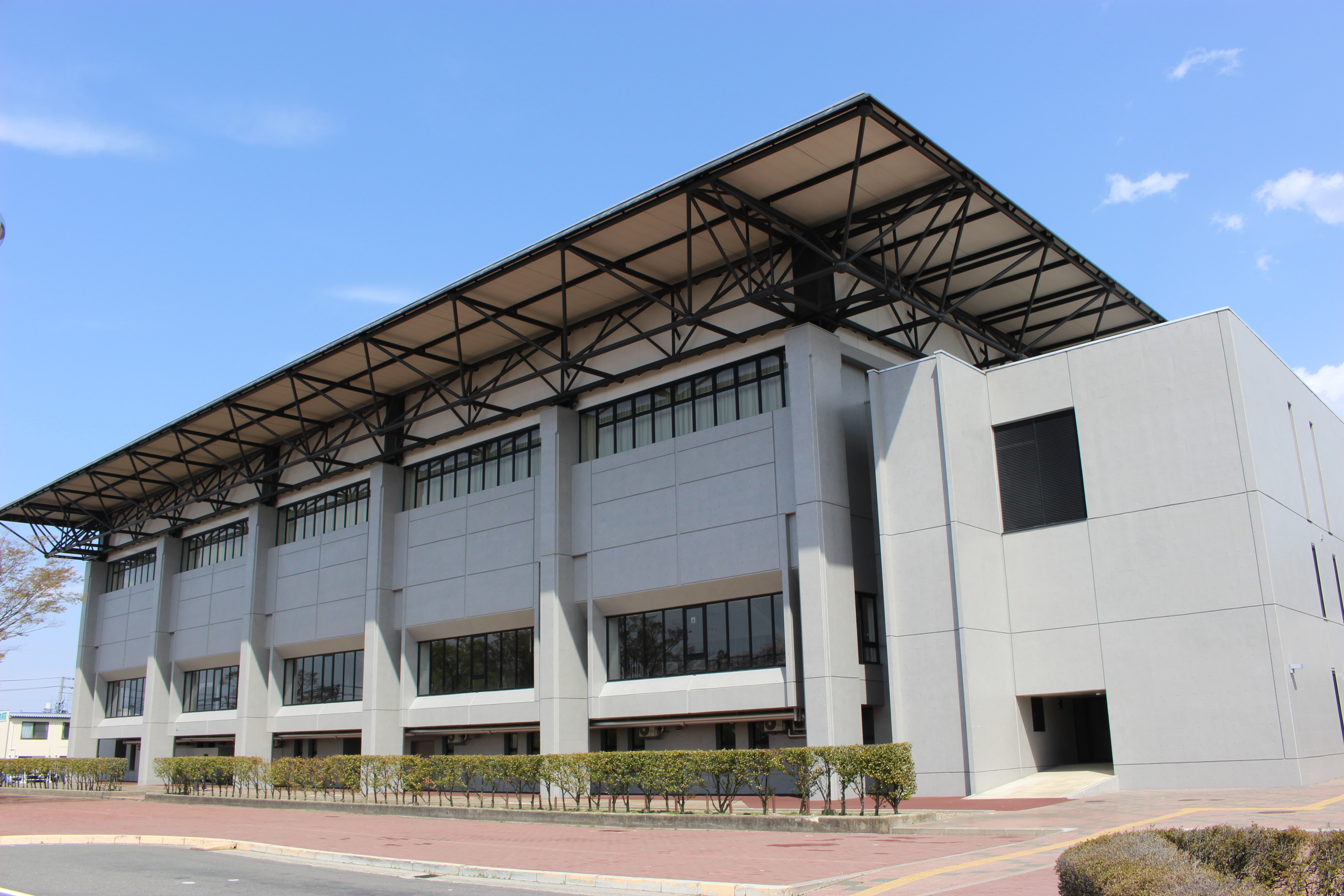

- Location within Fukushima Prefecture Location within Japan
- Interactive map of Kōriyama General Gymnasium
- Full name: Kōriyama General Gymnasium
- Location: Kōriyama, Fukushima, Japan
- Coordinates: 37°23′50.5″N 140°21′50.1″E
- Owner: Koriyama city
- Operator: Koriyama city
- Capacity: 7,056

Construction
- Opened: 1973
- Cost
- Architect: Yamashita Sekkei

Tenant
- Fukushima Firebonds

Website
- www.city.koriyama.fukushima.jp/162000/leisure/sogo.html

Horaiya Koriyama General Gymnasium (郡山総合体育館, Koriyama Sogo Taiku-kan) is an arena in Kōriyama, Fukushima, Japan. It is the home arena of the Fukushima Firebonds of the B.League, Japan's professional basketball league.

== Entertainment Events ==
- ABBA
- Stevie Wonder
- Yellow Magic Orchestra

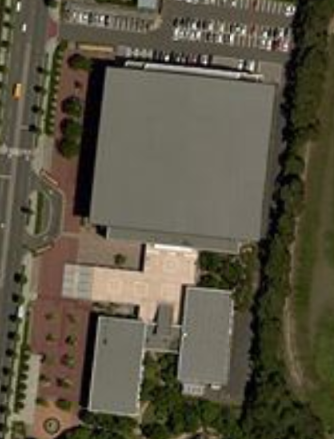
Satellite view
