= 2020–21 V.League Division 1 Women's =

- League: V.League Division 1
- Sport: Volleyball
- Duration: Oct 17, 2020 – Feb 21, 2021
- Games: 132 (Regular round); 12 (Final stage); 30 (V Cup)
- Teams: 12

2020–2021 Results
- Season champions: Toray Arrows
- Top scorer: Jana Kulan
- Finals champions: JT Marvelous
- Runners-up: Toray Arrows
- Finals MVP: Mako Kobata

Women's V.League Division 1 seasons
- 2019–20 2021–22

The Volleyball 2020–21 V.League Division 1 Women's is the 27th volleyball tournament year and the 3rd top level women's volleyball tournament of the newly branded and reorganized V.League (Japan). It is held from October 17, 2020 – February 21, 2021.

On August 4, 2020 the V.League Organization announced measures it has implemented to safeguard athletes, visitors, and related parties against the new coronavirus. Venues will be limited to 50% capacity and divided into three zones:

- Zone 1: Competition-related area (athletes, referees, etc.)
- Zone 2: Tournament management staff & press-related area
- Zone 3: Customer area

Visitors will have their body temperature taken before entering and are prohibited from certain forms of support such as loud cheering, using thundersticks, and high-fiving.

The V. League Division 1 Women's V Cup will be held from February 27, 2021 to March 28, 2021. All twelve teams will participate but players who have been invited to the Japan women's national volleyball team will begin early training for the 2021 Olympics and will not participate in the V Cup.

The Empress' Cup Final Round is scheduled for December 11–20, 2020. The Prefecture and Block rounds were cancelled due to the COVID-19 pandemic in Japan.

The Kurowashiki All Japan Volleyball Tournament opens in May every year in Osaka and serves as the final competition of the season.

== Clubs ==
Locations of the 2020–21 V.League Division 1 Women's clubs

=== Personnel ===
2020–21 V.League Division 1 Women's Personnel
Club	Head coach	Captain	City, Prefecture	Colors	Main Sponsor
Denso Airybees	(Japan) Gen Kawakita	(Japan) Fumika Moriya	Nishio, Aichi		Denso
Himeji Victorina	(Japan) Kodai Nakaya	(Japan) Riho Sadakane	Himeji, Hyōgo		Himeji Victorina Co., Ltd.
Hisamitsu Springs	(Japan) Shingo Sakai	(Japan) Mana Toe	Tosu, Saga		Hisamitsu Pharmaceutical
Hitachi Rivale	(Japan) Asako Tajimi	(Japan) Maiha Haga	Hitachinaka, Ibaraki		Hitachi Automotive Systems
JT Marvelous	(Japan) Tomoko Yoshihara	(Japan) Mako Kobata	Osaka, Hyogo		Japan Tobacco Ltd.
Kurobe AquaFairies	(Japan) Takaya Maruyama	(Japan) Saki Maruyama	Kurobe, Toyama		Kurobe AquaFairies
NEC Red Rockets	(Japan) Takayuki Kaneko	(Japan) Misaki Yamauchi	Kawasaki, Kanagawa		NEC
Okayama Seagulls	(Japan) Akiyoshi Kawamoto	(Japan) Aimi Kawashima	Okayama		Okayama Seagulls Co., Ltd.
PFU BlueCats	(Japan) Masayasu Sakamoto	(Japan) Ayaka Horiguchi	Kanazawa, Ishikawa		PFU Limited
Saitama Ageo Medics	(Brazil) Antônio Marcos Lerbach	(Japan) Akane Yamagishi	Ageo, Saitama		Ageo Medical Group
Toray Arrows	(Japan) Akira Koshiya	(Japan) Ai Kurogo	Ōtsu, Shiga		Toray Industries
Toyota Auto Body Queenseis	(Japan) Haruya Indo	(Japan) Aya Watanabe	Kariya, Aichi		Toyota Auto Body

=== Foreign players ===
The number of foreign players is restricted to one per club world wide plus one per club from ASEAN nations.

V.League Division 1 Women's foreign players 2020-21
Team	World wide	ASEAN
Denso Airybees	(United States) Kathryn Plummer (NORCECA)	—N/a
Himeji Victorina	(Moldova) Aliona Martiniuc (CEV)	—N/a
Hisamitsu Springs	(United States) Foluke Akinradewo (NORCECA)	—N/a
Hitachi Rivale	(United States) Hannah Tapp (NORCECA)	—N/a
JT Marvelous	(United States) Andrea Drews (NORCECA)	(Thailand) Thatdao Nuekjang (AVC)
Kurobe AquaFairies	(United States) Simone Lee (NORCECA)	—N/a
NEC Red Rockets	(Turkey) Neriman Özsoy (CEV)	—N/a
Okayama Seagulls	—N/a	—N/a
PFU BlueCats	(Venezuela) Roslandy Acosta (CSV)	(Thailand) Hathairat Jarat (AVC)
Saitama Ageo Medics	(Canada) Shainah Joseph (NORCECA)	(Philippines) Jaja Santiago (AVC)
Toray Arrows	(Azerbaijan) Jana Kulan (CEV)	—N/a
Toyota Auto Body Queenseis	(Italy) Indre Sorokaite (CEV)	(Thailand) Pornpun Guedpard (AVC)

=== Transfer players ===
Player	Moving from	Moving to
(Japan) Tamaki Matsui	(Japan) JWCPE	(Japan) Denso Airybees
(Japan) Mami Yokota	(Japan) Tokai Mermaids	(Japan) Denso Airybees
(Japan) Satomi Fukudome	(Japan) Ryukoku University	(Japan) Denso Airybees
(United States) Kathryn Plummer	(Italy) Saugella Team Monza	(Japan) Denso Airybees
(Japan) Shiori Aratani	(Japan) NEC Red Rockets	(Japan) Himeji Victorina
(Japan) Akane Shimizu	(Japan) Aichi Gakuin University	(Japan) Himeji Victorina
(Japan) Akiho Matsumoto	(Japan) Tokai Mermaids	(Japan) Himeji Victorina
(Japan) Moeri Hanai	(Japan) NSSU	(Japan) Himeji Victorina
(Moldova) Aliona Martiniuc	(Russia) Proton-Saratov	(Japan) Himeji Victorina
(Japan) Chihiro Sasaki	(Japan) TWCPE	(Japan) Himeji Victorina
(Japan) Nana Magota	(Japan) Fukuoka University	(Japan) Himeji Victorina
(Japan) Moe Kiyota	(Japan) Bunkyo Gakuin High School (ja)	(Japan) Himeji Victorina
(Japan) Kano Miyaji	(Japan) Shimokitazawa Seitoku (ja)	(Japan) Himeji Victorina
(Japan) Misaki Inoue	(Japan) Saitama Ageo Medics	(Japan) Hisamitsu Springs
(Japan) Ayaka Araki	(Japan) Higashi Kyushu Ryukoku High School (ja)	(Japan) Hisamitsu Springs
(Japan) Yuka Ikeya	(Japan) NSSU	(Japan) Hisamitsu Springs
(Japan) Akari Shirasawa	(Japan) NIFS	(Japan) Hisamitsu Springs
(Japan) Sarina Sakai	(Japan) Tohoku Fukushi University	(Japan) Hitachi Rivale
(Japan) Rui Nonaka	(Japan) Akita North High School (ja)	(Japan) Hitachi Rivale
(Japan) Saori Kamizawa	(Japan) Furukawa Gakuen High School (ja)	(Japan) Hitachi Rivale
(Japan) Keito Saiga	(Japan) Funabashi High School (ja)	(Japan) Hitachi Rivale
(Japan) Nana Sakakibara	(Japan) Hachiojijissen (ja)	(Japan) JT Marvelous
(Thailand) Thatdao Nuekjang	(Thailand) Khonkaen Star VC	(Japan) JT Marvelous
(Japan) Yukiko Wada	(Japan) Kyoto Tachibana High School (ja)	(Japan) JT Marvelous
(Japan) Yuka Tateishi	(Japan) Aoyama Gakuin University	(Japan) Kurobe AquaFairies
(Japan) Yuka Kosugi	(Japan) Mukogawa Women's University	(Japan) Kurobe AquaFairies
(Japan) Mayuka Tobe	(Japan) Tohoku Fukushi University	(Japan) Kurobe AquaFairies
(Japan) Hinano Michishita	(Japan) Kobe Shinwa Women's University	(Japan) Kurobe AquaFairies
(Japan) Kasumi Nojima	(Japan) Aoyama Gakuin University	(Japan) NEC Red Rockets
(Japan) Moeka Kinoe	(Japan) University of Tsukuba	(Japan) NEC Red Rockets
(Japan) Minami Yasuda	(Japan) Okazaki Gakuen High School (ja)	(Japan) NEC Red Rockets
(Turkey) Neriman Özsoy	(Japan) Toyota Auto Body Queenseis	(Japan) NEC Red Rockets
(Japan) Uran Kido	(Japan) Osaka International Takii High School (ja)	(Japan) Okayama Seagulls
(Japan) Mei Funada	(Japan) Matsuyama Shinonome High School (ja)	(Japan) Okayama Seagulls
(Japan) Kyoka Seto	(Japan) Juntendo University	(Japan) PFU BlueCats
(Japan) Mari Morita	(Japan) JWCPE	(Japan) PFU BlueCats
(Japan) Natsumi Watabiki	(Japan) Kurobe AquaFairies	(Japan) PFU BlueCats
(Japan) Mana Ishikawa	(Turkey) TED Ankara	(Japan) PFU BlueCats
(Thailand) Hathairat Jarat	(Thailand) Khonkaen Star VC	(Japan) PFU BlueCats
(Venezuela) Roslandy Acosta	(Brazil) Itambé/Minas	(Japan) PFU BlueCats
(Canada) Shainah Joseph	(Philippines) Sta. Lucia Lady Realtors	(Japan) Saitama Ageo Medics
(Japan) Mami Uchiseto	(Japan) Toyota Auto Body Queenseis	(Japan) Saitama Ageo Medics
(Japan) Hazuki Nakamoto	(Japan) Himeji Victorina	(Japan) Saitama Ageo Medics
(Japan) Hiromi Tagawa	(Japan) Panasonic Bluebells	(Japan) Saitama Ageo Medics
(Japan) Ryo Sakamoto	(Japan) Kyoto Tachibana High School (ja)	(Japan) Toray Arrows
(Japan) Kazane Kumai	(Japan) NSSU	(Japan) Toyota Auto Body Queenseis
(Japan) Saki Inaba	(Japan) Kyushu Bunka Gakuen High School (ja)	(Japan) Toyota Auto Body Queenseis
(Japan) Ayaka Matsumoto	(Japan) Saitama Ageo Medics	(Japan) Toyota Auto Body Queenseis
(Thailand) Pornpun Guedpard	(Thailand) Khonkaen Star VC	(Japan) Toyota Auto Body Queenseis
(Italy) Indre Sorokaite	(Italy) Imoco Volley Conegliano	(Japan) Toyota Auto Body Queenseis

== Stadiums ==
Regular round 2020–2021

Adastria Arena, Mito
Baycom Gymnasium, Amagasaki (ja)
CNA Arena, Akita
Fukuoka Citizens Gymnasium
Goshogawara Citizen Gymnasium
Green Arena, Kobe
Hitachinaka Sports Facility (ja)

Kakogawa Municipal Gymnasium
Kanazawa City Gymnasium
Kitagas Arena, Sapporo (ja)
Koriyama Gymnasium
Kuki City Gymnasium
Kurobe General Sports Center (ja)
Matto Park Arena, Hakusan

Nishio City Gymnasium (ja)
Ookini Arena, Osaka
Ota Ward Gymnasium, Tokyo
Saga Sunrise Park Gymnasium
Saiden Chemical Arena, Saitama (ja)
Shiga Gymnasium, Otsu
Shimadzu Arena, Kyoto (ja)

Sky Hall Toyota
Sun Arena, Wajima
Todoroki Arena, Kawasaki
Wing Arena Kariya
Wink Gymnasium, Himeji
Yokkaichi City Gymnasium
Zip Arena, Okayama

Final Stage 2020–2021

Saitama Prefectural Budokan, Ageo (ja)

Ota Ward Gymnasium, Tokyo

Ikenokawa Sakura Arena, Hitachi

V Cup 2020–2021

Okazaki Park Gymnasium, Okazaki
Ota Ward Gymnasium, Tokyo

Saitama Budokan, Ageo (ja)
Sanyo Fureai Park, Akaiwa

Shimadzu Arena, Kyoto (ja)
Tokorozawa Municipal Gymnasium

Toyama Seibu Sports Center, Tonami
Brex Arena, Utsunomiya

== Schedule ==
Regular round begins October 17, 2020 (Saturday) and ends February 21, 2021 (Sunday). Matches are played every Saturday and Sunday.

1. Each team will play twenty-two matches
2. Regular Season is a twelve team double round robin:
  - Round 1: October 17 to November 28, 2020
  - Round 2: December 4 to February 14, 2021

At the end of the regular round, teams are ranked and divided into three groups of four teams each and will compete in the final stage. Teams are ranked in the regular round by: wins -> points -> set percentage -> scoring rate.

- (Group 1) 1st–4th place
- (Group 2) 5th–8th place
- (Group 3) 9th–12th place

Final stage will be held the weekend of February 20–21, 2021 (semi-finals and finals for each group)

1. Saturday, the 1st and 4th ranked team in each group, and the 2nd and 3rd ranked team in each group, will compete
2. Sunday, the winners, and the losers, of Saturday's matches will compete for final league ranking
  - Group 1 is the semi-finals and final of the League
  - Group 2 is jockeying for position (5th–8th) in the final league ranking
  - Group 3 is essentially the Challenge 4. Two losing teams will play the V.Challenge match

V Cup
Qualifying round begins February 27, 2021 (Saturday) and ends March 21, 2021 (Sunday)

1. Teams are divided into two groups
  - Group A: JT Marvelous, Okayama Seagulls, Denso Airybees, Toyota Auto Body Queenseis, Hisamitsu Springs, Himeji Victorina
  - Group B: Saitama Ageo Medics, Toray Arrows, NEC Red Rockets, Hitachi Rivale, Kurobe AquaFairies, PFU BlueCats
2. Each group plays a single round robin

Final round will be held the weekend of March 27–28, 2021

1. Top two teams from each group play a semi-final
2. Winners will play a final match

V.Challenge match (V1-V2 promotion–relegation matches): TBD

== Season standing procedure ==
Many matches were canceled this year due to the COVID-19 pandemic in Japan and the number of completed matches varied from team to team so the season standing procedure was changed from "number of matches won" to win rate percentage.

Tie breakers are as follows:

- If two or more teams have the same winning percentage, the team with the highest set rate will be ranked higher.
- If the set rate is also the same, the team with the highest scoring rate will be ranked higher.
- If the score rate is also the same, the teams are calculated and the top ranks are decided in the order of win rate, set rate, and score rate.

== Regular round ==
=== Final standing ===
Final ranking: 1st–4th place participation
Final ranking: 5th–8th place participation
Final ranking: 9th–12th place participation

2020–21 V.League Division 1 Women's Regular round Final Standing
Rank	Team	Wins	Losses	Win Rate	Sets Won	Sets Lost	Set Rate
1	Toray Arrows	21	0	100.00	63	11	5.73
2	JT Marvelous	16	4	80.00	52	21	2.48
3	NEC Red Rockets	15	5	75.00	50	23	2.17
4	Denso Airybees	12	7	63.20	44	32	1.38
5	Saitama Ageo Medics	12	8	60.00	41	31	1.32
6	Okayama Seagulls	11	10	52.40	39	40	0.97
7	Hisamitsu Springs	10	11	47.60	40	39	1.03
8	Hitachi Rivale	6	15	28.60	28	53	0.53
9	Toyota Auto Body Queenseis	6	15	28.60	24	48	0.50
10	PFU BlueCats	4	13	23.50	18	43	0.42
11	Kurobe AquaFairies	4	16	20.00	24	52	0.46
12	Himeji Victorina	4	17	19.00	26	56	0.46

=== Individual awards ===
2020–21 V.League Division 1 Women's Regular round Individual Awards
Award	Player	Team	Achievement	# of Times
Top Scorer	Jana Kulan	Toray Arrows	436 Total Points	2nd Time
Spike Award	Haruyo Shimamura	NEC Red Rockets	51.7% Kill Rate	1st Time
Block Award	Foluke Akinradewo; Erika Araki	Hisamitsu Springs; Toyota Auto Body Queenseis	0.81 Blocks/set	2nd Time; 2nd Time
Serve Award	Misaki Yamauchi	NEC Red Rockets	15.6% Serve Effect Rate	1st Time
Receive Award	Mako Kobata	JT Marvelous	68.3% Reception Rate	1st Time

=== Match results ===
==== Round 1 ====
Week 1

17 October 2020; 12:00	PFU BlueCats	2–3	Kurobe AquaFairies	Matto Park Arena, Hakusan; Attendance: 0 Referees: Yui Asai
17 October 2020; 12:00	(20-25, 25-19, 25-19, 19-25, 12-15); Report A Report B			Matto Park Arena, Hakusan; Attendance: 0 Referees: Yui Asai

17 October 2020; 12:00	Hitachi Rivale	3–2	Himeji Victorina	Adastria Mito Arena; Attendance: 685; Referees: Toshie Akai
17 October 2020; 12:00	(25-16, 22-25, 21-25, 25-20, 15-12); Report A Report B			Adastria Mito Arena; Attendance: 685; Referees: Toshie Akai

17 October 2020; 13:00	Hisamitsu Springs	3–0	Denso Airybees	Saga Sunrise Park Gymnasium; Attendance: 465; Referees: Hirokazu Tomita
17 October 2020; 13:00	(25-23, 26-24, 26-24); Report A Report B			Saga Sunrise Park Gymnasium; Attendance: 465; Referees: Hirokazu Tomita

17 October 2020; 15:00	Saitama Ageo Medics	0–3	Toray Arrows	Matto Park Arena, Hakusan; Attendance: 0 Referees: Yuka Kitamura
17 October 2020; 15:00	(20-25, 18-25, 14-25); Report A Report B			Matto Park Arena, Hakusan; Attendance: 0 Referees: Yuka Kitamura

17 October 2020; 16:00	JT Marvelous	3–0	Okayama Seagulls	Saga Sunrise Park Gymnasium; Attendance: 465; Referees: Takeshi Eshita
17 October 2020; 16:00	(25-20, 25-22, 25-21); Report A Report B			Saga Sunrise Park Gymnasium; Attendance: 465; Referees: Takeshi Eshita

18 October 2020; 12:00	Hitachi Rivale	3–2	Toyota Auto Body Queenseis	Adastria Mito Arena; Attendance: 728; Referees: Mikako Masuoka
18 October 2020; 12:00	(16-25, 25-15, 21-25, 25-20, 15-13); Report A Report B			Adastria Mito Arena; Attendance: 728; Referees: Mikako Masuoka

18 October 2020; 12:00	Hisamitsu Springs	1–3	JT Marvelous	Saga Sunrise Park Gymnasium; Attendance: 668; Referees: Junichi Hayashi
18 October 2020; 12:00	(22-25, 27-25, 19-25, 13-25); Report A Report B			Saga Sunrise Park Gymnasium; Attendance: 668; Referees: Junichi Hayashi

18 October 2020; 13:00	PFU BlueCats	0–3	Toray Arrows	Matto Park Arena, Hakusan; Attendance: 0 Referees: Atsushi Hattori
18 October 2020; 13:00	(13-25, 10-25, 17-25); Report A Report B			Matto Park Arena, Hakusan; Attendance: 0 Referees: Atsushi Hattori

18 October 2020; 15:00	Okayama Seagulls	1–3	NEC Red Rockets	Saga Sunrise Park Gymnasium; Attendance: 668; Referees: Hirokazu Tomita
18 October 2020; 15:00	(25-19, 19-25, 19-25, 18-25); Report A Report B			Saga Sunrise Park Gymnasium; Attendance: 668; Referees: Hirokazu Tomita

18 October 2020; 15:30	Saitama Ageo Medics	3–1	Kurobe AquaFairies	Matto Park Arena, Hakusan; Attendance: 0 Referees: Satomi Naito
18 October 2020; 15:30	(23-25, 25-23, 25-23, 25-23); Report A Report B			Matto Park Arena, Hakusan; Attendance: 0 Referees: Satomi Naito

Week 2

24 October 2020; 11:00	Toyota Auto Body Queenseis	0–3	Denso Airybees	Yokkaichi City Gymnasium; Attendance: 0 Referees: Masato Ono
24 October 2020; 11:00	(13-25, 20-25, 19-25); Report A Report B			Yokkaichi City Gymnasium; Attendance: 0 Referees: Masato Ono

24 October 2020; 12:00	Saitama Ageo Medics	2–3	Himeji Victorina	Kuki City Gymnasium; Attendance: 0 Referees: Yuka Kitamura
24 October 2020; 12:00	(25-18, 25-17, 23-25, 22-25, 15-17); Report A Report B			Kuki City Gymnasium; Attendance: 0 Referees: Yuka Kitamura

24 October 2020; 13:00	NEC Red Rockets	3–1	JT Marvelous	Todoroki Arena, Kawasaki; Attendance: 1,835; Referees: Toshie Akai
24 October 2020; 13:00	(25-18, 25-19, 26-28, 30-28); Report A Report B			Todoroki Arena, Kawasaki; Attendance: 1,835; Referees: Toshie Akai

24 October 2020; 15:00	Hisamitsu Springs	3–0	Hitachi Rivale	Kuki City Gymnasium; Attendance: 0 Referees: Yui Asai
24 October 2020; 15:00	(25-22, 25-21, 25-22); Report A Report B			Kuki City Gymnasium; Attendance: 0 Referees: Yui Asai

24 October 2020; 15:30	Okayama Seagulls	3–0	Kurobe AquaFairies	Todoroki Arena, Kawasaki; Attendance: 1,451; Referees: Tatsumi Sawa
24 October 2020; 15:30	(25-15, 25-17, 25-21); Report A Report B			Todoroki Arena, Kawasaki; Attendance: 1,451; Referees: Tatsumi Sawa

25 October 2020; 12:00	Toyota Auto Body Queenseis	0–3	Toray Arrows	Yokkaichi City Gymnasium; Attendance: 0 Referees: Ken Nakayama
25 October 2020; 12:00	(19-25, 26-28, 17-25); Report A Report B			Yokkaichi City Gymnasium; Attendance: 0 Referees: Ken Nakayama

25 October 2020; 12:00	Saitama Ageo Medics	3–0	Hisamitsu Springs	Kuki City Gymnasium; Attendance: 0 Referees: Mikako Masuoka
25 October 2020; 12:00	(25-22, 25-15 ,25-19); Report A Report B			Kuki City Gymnasium; Attendance: 0 Referees: Mikako Masuoka

25 October 2020; 13:00	NEC Red Rockets	3–0	Kurobe AquaFairies	Todoroki Arena, Kawasaki; Attendance: 1,425; Referees: Satomi Naito
25 October 2020; 13:00	(25-20, 25-22, 25-19); Report A Report B			Todoroki Arena, Kawasaki; Attendance: 1,425; Referees: Satomi Naito

Week 3

31 October 2020; 12:00	Denso Airybees	3–0	Kurobe AquaFairies	Koriyama Gymnasium; Attendance: 900; Referees: Hiroaki Takahashi
31 October 2020; 12:00	(25-15, 25-11, 25-21); Report A Report B			Koriyama Gymnasium; Attendance: 900; Referees: Hiroaki Takahashi

31 October 2020; 13:00	Himeji Victorina	1–3	Hisamitsu Springs	Wink Gymnasium, Himeji; Attendance: 728; Referees: Toshie Akai
31 October 2020; 13:00	(19-25, 25-19, 19-25, 9-25); Report A Report B			Wink Gymnasium, Himeji; Attendance: 728; Referees: Toshie Akai

31 October 2020; 13:05	Okayama Seagulls	3–1	Saitama Ageo Medics	Zip Arena, Okayama; Attendance: 950; Referees: Yuka Kitamura
31 October 2020; 13:05	(25-17, 14-25, 25-16, 25-15); Report A Report B			Zip Arena, Okayama; Attendance: 950; Referees: Yuka Kitamura

31 October 2020; 15:30	JT Marvelous	3–0	Hitachi Rivale	Zip Arena, Okayama; Attendance: 800; Referees: Yasuo Chiyonobu
31 October 2020; 15:30	(25-18, 27-25, 25-21); Report A Report B			Zip Arena, Okayama; Attendance: 800; Referees: Yasuo Chiyonobu

31 October 2020; 16:00	Toray Arrows	3–0	NEC Red Rockets	Wink Gymnasium, Himeji; Attendance: 450; Referees: Kazuyoshi Yamamoto
31 October 2020; 16:00	(25-16, 25-22, 25-22); Report A Report B			Wink Gymnasium, Himeji; Attendance: 450; Referees: Kazuyoshi Yamamoto

01 November 2020; 13:00	Denso Airybees	3–0	PFU BlueCats	Koriyama Gymnasium; Attendance: 1,050; Referees: Atsushi Hattori
01 November 2020; 13:00	(25-11, 25-22, 25-17); Report A Report B			Koriyama Gymnasium; Attendance: 1,050; Referees: Atsushi Hattori

01 November 2020; 13:00	Himeji Victorina	1–3	NEC Red Rockets	Wink Gymnasium, Himeji; Attendance: 670; Referees: Satomi Naito
01 November 2020; 13:00	(27-29, 27-25, 22-25, 26-28); Report A Report B			Wink Gymnasium, Himeji; Attendance: 670; Referees: Satomi Naito

01 November 2020; 13:00	Okayama Seagulls	3–1	Hitachi Rivale	Zip Arena, Okayama; Attendance: 1,100; Referees: Ryota Kunigami
01 November 2020; 13:00	(25-19, 27-29, 25-19, 25-13); Report A Report B			Zip Arena, Okayama; Attendance: 1,100; Referees: Ryota Kunigami

01 November 2020; 15:30	JT Marvelous	3–0	Saitama Ageo Medics	Zip Arena, Okayama; Attendance: 750; Referees: Keiko Tanemoto
01 November 2020; 15:30	(25-21, 25-21, 25-22); Report A Report B			Zip Arena, Okayama; Attendance: 750; Referees: Keiko Tanemoto

01 November 2020; 16:00	Toyota Auto Body Queenseis	0–3	Hisamitsu Springs	Wink Gymnasium, Himeji; Attendance: 350; Referees: Toshie Akai
01 November 2020; 16:00	(21-25, 20-25, 21-25); Report A Report B			Wink Gymnasium, Himeji; Attendance: 350; Referees: Toshie Akai

Week 4

07 November 2020; 12:00	Saitama Ageo Medics	3–1	Toyota Auto Body Queenseis	Shimadzu Arena, Kyoto (ja); Attendance: 0 Referees: Masato Ono
07 November 2020; 12:00	(25-14, 25-23, 26-28, 25-17); Report A Report B			Shimadzu Arena, Kyoto (ja); Attendance: 0 Referees: Masato Ono

07 November 2020; 13:00	JT Marvelous	3–2	Denso Airybees	Kakogawa Municipal Gymnasium; Attendance: 460; Referees: Yuka Kitamura
07 November 2020; 13:00	(25-19, 24-26, 25-18, 18-25, 15-11); Report A Report B			Kakogawa Municipal Gymnasium; Attendance: 460; Referees: Yuka Kitamura

07 November 2020; 15:00	NEC Red Rockets	3–0	PFU BlueCats	Shimadzu Arena, Kyoto (ja); Attendance: 0 Referees: Takeshi Eshita
07 November 2020; 15:00	(25-10, 25-20, 25-18); Report A Report B			Shimadzu Arena, Kyoto (ja); Attendance: 0 Referees: Takeshi Eshita

07 November 2020; 15:00	Toray Arrows	3–1	Hisamitsu Springs	Shiga Gymnasium, Otsu; Attendance: 826; Referees: Mikako Masuoka
07 November 2020; 15:00	(25-19, 23-25, 25-17, 25-22); Report A Report B			Shiga Gymnasium, Otsu; Attendance: 826; Referees: Mikako Masuoka

07 November 2020; 16:00	Okayama Seagulls	3–0	Himeji Victorina	Kakogawa Municipal Gymnasium; Attendance: 240; Referees: Tatsumi Sawa
07 November 2020; 16:00	(25-16, 25-23, 25-23); Report A Report B			Kakogawa Municipal Gymnasium; Attendance: 240; Referees: Tatsumi Sawa

08 November 2020; 11:00	Toyota Auto Body Queenseis	3–0	PFU BlueCats	Shimadzu Arena, Kyoto (ja); Attendance: 0 Referees: Junichi Hayashi
08 November 2020; 11:00	(29-27, 25-21, 25-11 ) Report A Report B			Shimadzu Arena, Kyoto (ja); Attendance: 0 Referees: Junichi Hayashi

08 November 2020; 13:00	JT Marvelous	3–1	Himeji Victorina	Kakogawa Municipal Gymnasium; Attendance: 450; Referees: Satomi Naito
08 November 2020; 13:00	(19-25, 25-21, 25-22, 25-16 ) Report A Report B			Kakogawa Municipal Gymnasium; Attendance: 450; Referees: Satomi Naito

08 November 2020; 14:00	Saitama Ageo Medics	1–3	NEC Red Rockets	Shimadzu Arena, Kyoto (ja); Attendance: 0 Referees: Masao Ono
08 November 2020; 14:00	(17-25, 25-20, 22-25, 22-25); Report A Report B			Shimadzu Arena, Kyoto (ja); Attendance: 0 Referees: Masao Ono

08 November 2020; 15:00	Toray Arrows	3–2	Hitachi Rivale	Shiga Gymnasium, Otsu; Attendance: 824; Referees: Toshie Akai
08 November 2020; 15:00	(25-21, 19-25, 22-25, 25-16, 15-9); Report A Report B			Shiga Gymnasium, Otsu; Attendance: 824; Referees: Toshie Akai

08 November 2020; 15:30	Okayama Seagulls	1–3	Denso Airybees	Kakogawa Municipal Gymnasium; Attendance: 250; Referees: Yuka Kitamura
08 November 2020; 15:30	(23-25, 25-23, 21-25, 25-27); Report A Report B			Kakogawa Municipal Gymnasium; Attendance: 250; Referees: Yuka Kitamura

Week 5

14 November 2020; 12:00	Kurobe AquaFairies	3–2	Hisamitsu Springs	Kurobe General Sports Center (ja); Attendance: 1,500; Referees: Satomi Naito
14 November 2020; 12:00	(25-22, 22-25, 25-22, 19-25, 15-13); Report A Report B			Kurobe General Sports Center (ja); Attendance: 1,500; Referees: Satomi Naito

14 November 2020; 13:00	Denso Airybees	2–3	Toray Arrows	Nishio City Gymnasium (ja); Attendance: 930; Referees: Yuka Kitamura
14 November 2020; 13:00	(19-25, 23-25, 25-16, 25-21, 13-15); Report A Report B			Nishio City Gymnasium (ja); Attendance: 930; Referees: Yuka Kitamura

14 November 2020; 13:00	NEC Red Rockets	0–3	Toyota Auto Body Queenseis	Ota Ward Gymnasium, Tokyo; Attendance: 1,507; Referees: Toshie Akai
14 November 2020; 13:00	(23-25, 23-25, 21-25); Report A Report B			Ota Ward Gymnasium, Tokyo; Attendance: 1,507; Referees: Toshie Akai

14 November 2020; 16:00	Okayama Seagulls	3–1	PFU BlueCats	Kurobe General Sports Center (ja); Attendance: 1,600; Referees: Atsushi Hattori
14 November 2020; 16:00	(25-18, 24-26, 25-23, 25-19); Report A Report B			Kurobe General Sports Center (ja); Attendance: 1,600; Referees: Atsushi Hattori

14 November 2020; 15:30	Saitama Ageo Medics	3–0	Hitachi Rivale	Ota Ward Gymnasium, Tokyo; Attendance: 1,417; Referees: Masato Ono
14 November 2020; 15:30	(25-19, 25-19, 25-22); Report A Report B			Ota Ward Gymnasium, Tokyo; Attendance: 1,417; Referees: Masato Ono

15 November 2020; 12:00	Kurobe AquaFairies	1–3	JT Marvelous	Kurobe General Sports Center (ja); Attendance: 1,350; Referees: Mikako Masuoka
15 November 2020; 12:00	(25-17, 14-25, 20-25, 17-25); Report A Report B			Kurobe General Sports Center (ja); Attendance: 1,350; Referees: Mikako Masuoka

15 November 2020; 13:00	Denso Airybees	3–1	Himeji Victorina	Nishio City Gymnasium (ja); Attendance: 710; Referees: Hiroyuki Hara
15 November 2020; 13:00	(29-27, 18-25, 26-24, 25-18); Report A Report B			Nishio City Gymnasium (ja); Attendance: 710; Referees: Hiroyuki Hara

15 November 2020; 13:00	NEC Red Rockets	3–0	Hitachi Rivale	Ota Ward Gymnasium, Tokyo; Attendance: 1,437; Referees: Yuka Tsushima
15 November 2020; 13:00	(25-16, 25-21, 25-14); Report A Report B			Ota Ward Gymnasium, Tokyo; Attendance: 1,437; Referees: Yuka Tsushima

15 November 2020; 14:35	Hisamitsu Springs	3–1	PFU BlueCats	Kurobe General Sports Center (ja); Attendance: 1,500; Referees: Yui Asai
15 November 2020; 14:35	(25-19, 18-25, 25-15, 25-11); Report A Report B			Kurobe General Sports Center (ja); Attendance: 1,500; Referees: Yui Asai

Week 6

21 November 2020; 11:00	Denso Airybees	3–1	Hitachi Rivale	E. Plaza Ishikawa; Attendance: 0 Referees: Takeshi Eshita
21 November 2020; 11:00	(25-18, 23-25, 26-24, 25-21); Report A Report B			E. Plaza Ishikawa; Attendance: 0 Referees: Takeshi Eshita

21 November 2020; 13:00	Hisamitsu Springs	2–3	Okayama Seagulls	Fukuoka Citizens Gymnasium; Attendance: 700; Referees: Shin Yamamoto
21 November 2020; 13:00	(25-27, 25-20, 25-18, 22-25, 8-15); Report A Report B			Fukuoka Citizens Gymnasium; Attendance: 700; Referees: Shin Yamamoto

21 November 2020; 13:05	Himeji Victorina	0–3	Toray Arrows	Wink Gymnasium, Himeji; Attendance: 751; Referees: Hirokazu Tomita
21 November 2020; 13:05	(16-25, 14-25, 15-25); Report A Report B			Wink Gymnasium, Himeji; Attendance: 751; Referees: Hirokazu Tomita

21 November 2020; 14:00	PFU BlueCats	0–3	JT Marvelous	E. Plaza Ishikawa; Attendance: 0 Referees: Hiroyuki Hara
21 November 2020; 14:00	(17-25, 10-25, 18-25); Report A Report B			E. Plaza Ishikawa; Attendance: 0 Referees: Hiroyuki Hara

21 November 2020; 16:00	Toyota Auto Body Queenseis	0–3	Kurobe AquaFairies	Wink Gymnasium, Himeji; Attendance: 376; Referees: Satomi Naito
21 November 2020; 16:00	(16-25, 22-25, 23-25); Report A Report B			Wink Gymnasium, Himeji; Attendance: 376; Referees: Satomi Naito

22 November 2020; 13:00	Hisamitsu Springs	0–3	NEC Red Rockets	Fukuoka Citizens Gymnasium; Attendance: 1,000; Referees: Masato Ono
22 November 2020; 13:00	(16-25, 13-25, 15-25); Report A Report B			Fukuoka Citizens Gymnasium; Attendance: 1,000; Referees: Masato Ono

22 November 2020; 13:00	PFU BlueCats	1–3	Saitama Ageo Medics	E. Plaza Ishikawa; Attendance: 0 Referees: Yui Asai
22 November 2020; 13:00	(32-34, 21-25, 25-23, 13-25); Report A Report B			E. Plaza Ishikawa; Attendance: 0 Referees: Yui Asai

22 November 2020; 13:05	Himeji Victorina	2–3	Toyota Auto Body Queenseis	Wink Gymnasium, Himeji; Attendance: 782; Referees: Yuka Kitamura
22 November 2020; 13:05	(22-25, 25-16, 26-24, 24-26, 12-15); Report A Report B			Wink Gymnasium, Himeji; Attendance: 782; Referees: Yuka Kitamura

22 November 2020; 16:00	Toray Arrows	3–1	Kurobe AquaFairies	Wink Gymnasium, Himeji; Attendance: 446; Referees: Yasuo Chiyonobu
22 November 2020; 16:00	(25-22, 21-25, 25-14, 25-15); Report A Report B			Wink Gymnasium, Himeji; Attendance: 446; Referees: Yasuo Chiyonobu

Week 7

28 November 2020; 11:00	Kurobe AquaFairies	3–0	Himeji Victorina	E. Plaza Ishikawa; Attendance: 0 Referees: Yuka Kitamura
28 November 2020; 11:00	(25-22, 26-24, 25-20); Report A Report B			E. Plaza Ishikawa; Attendance: 0 Referees: Yuka Kitamura

28 November 2020; 12:00	Denso Airybees	3–2	NEC Red Rockets	Kitagas Arena, Sapporo (ja); Attendance: 710; Referees: Toshie Akai
28 November 2020; 12:00	(23-25, 25-20, 25-19, 17-25, 15-13); Report A Report B			Kitagas Arena, Sapporo (ja); Attendance: 710; Referees: Toshie Akai

28 November 2020; 13:35	Okayama Seagulls	0–3	Toray Arrows	Zip Arena, Okayama; Attendance: 1,350; Referees: Keiko Tanemoto
28 November 2020; 13:35	(19-25, 19-25, 20-25); Report A Report B			Zip Arena, Okayama; Attendance: 1,350; Referees: Keiko Tanemoto

28 November 2020; 14:00	PFU BlueCats	3–1	Hitachi Rivale	E. Plaza Ishikawa; Attendance: 0 Referees: Satomi Naito
28 November 2020; 14:00	(25-20, 28-30, 25-22, 25-22); Report A Report B			E. Plaza Ishikawa; Attendance: 0 Referees: Satomi Naito

28 November 2020; 16:00	JT Marvelous	3–0	Toyota Auto Body Queenseis	Zip Arena, Okayama; Attendance: 900; Referees: Hirokazu Tomita
28 November 2020; 16:00	(25-21, 25-15, 25-20); Report A Report B			Zip Arena, Okayama; Attendance: 900; Referees: Hirokazu Tomita

29 November 2020; 11:00	Hitachi Rivale	3–2	Kurobe AquaFairies	E. Plaza Ishikawa; Attendance: 0 Referees: Tomoto Shiro
29 November 2020; 11:00	(25-20, 18-25, 22-25, 25-20, 15-7); Report A Report B			E. Plaza Ishikawa; Attendance: 0 Referees: Tomoto Shiro

29 November 2020; 11:00	Denso Airybees	3–0	Saitama Ageo Medics	Kitagas Arena, Sapporo (ja); Attendance: 510; Referees: Taku Masaoka
29 November 2020; 11:00	(25-22, 25-19, 27-25); Report A Report B			Kitagas Arena, Sapporo (ja); Attendance: 510; Referees: Taku Masaoka

29 November 2020; 13:05	Okayama Seagulls	3–2	Toyota Auto Body Queenseis	Zip Arena, Okayama; Attendance: 1,200; Referees: Mikako Masuoka
29 November 2020; 13:05	(25-17, 25-21, 24-26, 25-27, 17-15); Report A Report B			Zip Arena, Okayama; Attendance: 1,200; Referees: Mikako Masuoka

29 November 2020; 14:00	PFU BlueCats	3–2	Himeji Victorina	E. Plaza Ishikawa; Attendance: 0 Referees: Masato Ono
29 November 2020; 14:00	(18-25, 25-16, 18-25, 25-21, 15-12); Report A Report B			E. Plaza Ishikawa; Attendance: 0 Referees: Masato Ono

29 November 2020; 16:00	JT Marvelous	1–3	Toray Arrows	Zip Arena, Okayama; Attendance: 850; Referees: Keiko Tanemoto
29 November 2020; 16:00	(22-25, 27-25, 18-25, 17-25); Report A Report B			Zip Arena, Okayama; Attendance: 850; Referees: Keiko Tanemoto

==== Round 2 ====
Week 1

04 December 2020; 18:30	NEC Red Rockets	3–0	Himeji Victorina	Todoroki Arena, Kawasaki; Attendance: 1,983; Referees: Ken Nakayama
04 December 2020; 18:30	(25-18, 28-26, 25-21); Report A Report B			Todoroki Arena, Kawasaki; Attendance: 1,983; Referees: Ken Nakayama

05 December 2020; 11:00	Toray Arrows	3–0	PFU BlueCats	CNA Arena, Akita; Attendance: 0 Referees: Hiroaki Takahashi
05 December 2020; 11:00	(25-16, 25-23, 25-18); Report A Report B			CNA Arena, Akita; Attendance: 0 Referees: Hiroaki Takahashi

05 December 2020; 13:00	NEC Red Rockets	3–1	Denso Airybees	Todoroki Arena, Kawasaki; Attendance: 2,108; Referees: Tatsumi Sawa
05 December 2020; 13:00	(16-25, 25-18, 25-15, 25-17); Report A Report B			Todoroki Arena, Kawasaki; Attendance: 2,108; Referees: Tatsumi Sawa

05 December 2020; 13:05	Hisamitsu Springs	0–3	JT Marvelous	Saga Sunrise Park Gymnasium; Attendance: 672; Referees: Shin Yamamoto
05 December 2020; 13:05	(25-27, 23-25, 23-25); Report A Report B			Saga Sunrise Park Gymnasium; Attendance: 672; Referees: Shin Yamamoto

05 December 2020; 14:00	Hitachi Rivale	3–0	Toyota Auto Body Queenseis	CNA Arena, Akita; Attendance: 0 Referees: Yui Asai
05 December 2020; 14:00	(25-20, 25-19, 25-19); Report A Report B			CNA Arena, Akita; Attendance: 0 Referees: Yui Asai

05 December 2020; 15:45	Kurobe AquaFairies	1–3	Himeji Victorina	Todoroki Arena, Kawasaki; Attendance: 1,651; Referees: Satomi Naito
05 December 2020; 15:45	(25-23, 16-25, 11-25, 24-26); Report A Report B			Todoroki Arena, Kawasaki; Attendance: 1,651; Referees: Satomi Naito

05 December 2020; 16:00	Okayama Seagulls	1–3	Saitama Ageo Medics	Saga Sunrise Park Gymnasium; Attendance: 703; Referees: Junichi Hayashi
05 December 2020; 16:00	(26-24, 21-25, 22-25, 20-25); Report A Report B			Saga Sunrise Park Gymnasium; Attendance: 703; Referees: Junichi Hayashi

06 December 2020; 11:00	Toyota Auto Body Queenseis	3–0	PFU BlueCats	CNA Arena, Akita; Attendance: 0 Referees: Yuka Tsushima
06 December 2020; 11:00	(25-22, 25-12, 25-21); Report A Report B			CNA Arena, Akita; Attendance: 0 Referees: Yuka Tsushima

06 December 2020; 12:00	Denso Airybees	3–1	Kurobe AquaFairies	Todoroki Arena, Kawasaki; Attendance: 697; Referees: Tatsudai Sawa
06 December 2020; 12:00	(25-20, 23-25, 25-23, 25-18); Report A Report B			Todoroki Arena, Kawasaki; Attendance: 697; Referees: Tatsudai Sawa

06 December 2020; 12:00	Hisamitsu Springs	3–1	Saitama Ageo Medics	Saga Sunrise Park Gymnasium; Attendance: 697; Referees: Seiji Kiuchi
06 December 2020; 12:00	(25-22, 21-25, 25-19, 25-20); Report A Report B			Saga Sunrise Park Gymnasium; Attendance: 697; Referees: Seiji Kiuchi

06 December 2020; 14:00	Hitachi Rivale	1–3	Toray Arrows	CNA Arena, Akita; Attendance: 0 Referees: Yui Asai
06 December 2020; 14:00	(26-24, 15-25, 22-25, 14-25); Report A Report B			CNA Arena, Akita; Attendance: 0 Referees: Yui Asai

06 December 2020; 15:05	JT Marvelous	3–0	Okayama Seagulls	Saga Sunrise Park Gymnasium; Attendance: 739; Referees: Shin Yamamoto
06 December 2020; 15:05	(34-32, 25-9, 25-17); Report A Report B			Saga Sunrise Park Gymnasium; Attendance: 739; Referees: Shin Yamamoto

Week 2

09 January 2021; 13:30	Okayama Seagulls	v	NEC Red Rockets	Zip Arena, Okayama
09 January 2021; 13:30	(Event is canceled due to coronavirus); CANCELED			Zip Arena, Okayama

09 January 2021; 16:00	Toyota Auto Body Queenseis	v	Himeji Victorina	Zip Arena, Okayama
09 January 2021; 16:00	(Event is canceled due to coronavirus); Rescheduled for Friday 22 January 2021 at 15:00			Zip Arena, Okayama

10 January 2021; 13:00	Okayama Seagulls	v	Hitachi Rivale	Zip Arena, Okayama
10 January 2021; 13:00	(Event is canceled due to coronavirus); Rescheduled for Sunday 31 January 2021 at 15:30			Zip Arena, Okayama

10 January 2021; 15:30	Saitama Ageo Medics	v	Kurobe AquaFairies	Zip Arena, Okayama
10 January 2021; 15:30	(Event is canceled due to coronavirus); CANCELED			Zip Arena, Okayama

Week 3

16 January 2021; 12:00	Toyota Auto Body Queenseis	v	Denso Airybees	Wing Arena Kariya
16 January 2021; 12:00	(Event is canceled due to coronavirus); CANCELED			Wing Arena Kariya

16 January 2021; 12:00	Hitachi Rivale	3–0	Kurobe AquaFairies	Wing Arena Kariya; Attendance: 0 Referees: Satomi Naito
16 January 2021; 12:00	(25-23, 25-18, 25-23); Report A Report B			Wing Arena Kariya; Attendance: 0 Referees: Satomi Naito

16 January 2021; 13:00	Himeji Victorina	3–2	Hisamitsu Springs	Wink Gymnasium, Himeji; Attendance: 677; Referees: Nana Yoshioka
16 January 2021; 13:00	(15-25, 28-30, 25-23, 25-12, 15-11); Report A Report B			Wink Gymnasium, Himeji; Attendance: 677; Referees: Nana Yoshioka

16 January 2021; 13:05	Okayama Seagulls	0–3	Toray Arrows	Zip Arena, Okayama; Attendance: 1080; Referees: Tatsudai Sawa
16 January 2021; 13:05	(21-25, 16-25, 17-25); Report A Report B			Zip Arena, Okayama; Attendance: 1080; Referees: Tatsudai Sawa

16 January 2021; 15:30	Saitama Ageo Medics	3–1	PFU BlueCats	Zip Arena, Okayama; Attendance: 680; Referees: Hiroaki Takahashi
16 January 2021; 15:30	(25-17, 27-29, 25-16, 25-20); Report A Report B			Zip Arena, Okayama; Attendance: 680; Referees: Hiroaki Takahashi

16 January 2021; 16:15	JT Marvelous	2–3	NEC Red Rockets	Wink Gymnasium, Himeji; Attendance: 386; Referees: Taisuke Togawa
16 January 2021; 16:15	(21-25, 25-19, 28-26, 18-25, 9-15); Report A Report B			Wink Gymnasium, Himeji; Attendance: 386; Referees: Taisuke Togawa

17 January 2021; 12:00	Toyota Auto Body Queenseis	3–1	Kurobe AquaFairies	Wing Arena Kariya; Attendance: 0 Referees: Tomoto Shiro
17 January 2021; 12:00	(24-26, 25-22, 25-20, 25-21); Report A Report B			Wing Arena Kariya; Attendance: 0 Referees: Tomoto Shiro

17 January 2021; 13:00	Himeji Victorina	1–3	JT Marvelous	Wink Gymnasium, Himeji; Attendance: 643; Referees: Nana Yoshioka
17 January 2021; 13:00	(10-25, 25-18, 19-25, 23-25); Report A Report B			Wink Gymnasium, Himeji; Attendance: 643; Referees: Nana Yoshioka

17 January 2021; 13:05	Okayama Seagulls	3–0	PFU BlueCats	Zip Arena, Okayama; Attendance: 1,050; Referees: Hiroaki Takahashi
17 January 2021; 13:05	(25-9, 25-15, 25-19); Report A Report B			Zip Arena, Okayama; Attendance: 1,050; Referees: Hiroaki Takahashi

17 January 2021; 15:00	Denso Airybees	v	Hitachi Rivale	Wing Arena Kariya
17 January 2021; 15:00	(Event is canceled due to coronavirus); CANCELED			Wing Arena Kariya

17 January 2021; 15:30	Saitama Ageo Medics	0–3	Toray Arrows	Zip Arena, Okayama; Attendance: 650; Referees: Mikako Masuoka
17 January 2021; 15:30	(23-25, 23-25, 25-27); Report A Report B			Zip Arena, Okayama; Attendance: 650; Referees: Mikako Masuoka

17 January 2021; 16:00	Hisamitsu Springs	0–3	NEC Red Rockets	Wink Gymnasium, Himeji; Attendance: 361; Referees: Yasuo Chiyonobu
17 January 2021; 16:00	(22-25, 23-25, 21-25); Report A Report B			Wink Gymnasium, Himeji; Attendance: 361; Referees: Yasuo Chiyonobu

Week 4

22 January 2021; 15:00	Toyota Auto Body Queenseis	3–0	Himeji Victorina	Saiden Chemical Arena, Saitama (ja); Attendance: 0 Referees: Yui Asai
22 January 2021; 15:00	(25-18, 25-22, 27-25); Report A Report B			Saiden Chemical Arena, Saitama (ja); Attendance: 0 Referees: Yui Asai

23 January 2021; 12:00	Kurobe AquaFairies	1–3	Okayama Seagulls	Kurobe General Sports Center (ja); Attendance: 0 Referees: Mikako Masuoka
23 January 2021; 12:00	(25-23, 12-25, 15-25, 22-25); Report A Report B			Kurobe General Sports Center (ja); Attendance: 0 Referees: Mikako Masuoka

23 January 2021; 13:00	NEC Red Rockets	3–1	Hitachi Rivale	Todoroki Arena, Kawasaki; Attendance: 1,968; Referees: Toshie Akai
23 January 2021; 13:00	(25-27, 25-18, 26-24, 25-19); Report A Report B			Todoroki Arena, Kawasaki; Attendance: 1,968; Referees: Toshie Akai

23 January 2021; 14:00	Saitama Ageo Medics	3–0	Toyota Auto Body Queenseis	Saiden Chemical Arena, Saitama (ja); Attendance: 0 Referees: Atsushi Hattori
23 January 2021; 14:00	(25-23, 25-15, 26-24); Report A Report B			Saiden Chemical Arena, Saitama (ja); Attendance: 0 Referees: Atsushi Hattori

23 January 2021; 14:30	Toray Arrows	3–0	Hisamitsu Springs	Kurobe General Sports Center (ja); Attendance: 0 Referees: Satomi Naito
23 January 2021; 14:30	(25-12, 25-22, 25-20); Report A Report B			Kurobe General Sports Center (ja); Attendance: 0 Referees: Satomi Naito

23 January 2021; 15:30	JT Marvelous	v	PFU BlueCats	Todoroki Arena, Kawasaki
23 January 2021; 15:30	(Event is canceled due to coronavirus); CANCELED			Todoroki Arena, Kawasaki

24 January 2021; 12:00	Kurobe AquaFairies	1–3	Hisamitsu Springs	Kurobe General Sports Center (ja); Attendance: 0 Referees: Satomi Naito
24 January 2021; 12:00	(20-25, 25-19, 10-25, 18-25 ) Report A Report B			Kurobe General Sports Center (ja); Attendance: 0 Referees: Satomi Naito

24 January 2021; 13:00	NEC Red Rockets	v	PFU BlueCats	Todoroki Arena, Kawasaki
24 January 2021; 13:00	(Event is canceled due to coronavirus); CANCELED			Todoroki Arena, Kawasaki

24 January 2021; 13:00	Saitama Ageo Medics	3–0	Himeji Victorina	Saiden Chemical Arena, Saitama (ja); Attendance: 0 Referees: Yui Asai
24 January 2021; 13:00	(25-17, 25-18, 25-23); Report A Report B			Saiden Chemical Arena, Saitama (ja); Attendance: 0 Referees: Yui Asai

24 January 2021; 14:30	Denso Airybees	v	Toray Arrows	Kurobe General Sports Center (ja)
24 January 2021; 14:30	(Event is canceled due to coronavirus); CANCELED			Kurobe General Sports Center (ja)

Week 5

30 January 2021; 12:00	Denso Airybees	3–1	Himeji Victorina	Shiga Gymnasium, Otsu; Attendance: 0 Referees: Mikako Masuoka
30 January 2021; 12:00	(35-33, 25-23, 23-25, 25-22 ) Report A Report B			Shiga Gymnasium, Otsu; Attendance: 0 Referees: Mikako Masuoka

30 January 2021; 12:00	JT Marvelous	v	Saitama Ageo Medics	Ookini Arena, Osaka
30 January 2021; 12:00	(Event is canceled due to coronavirus); CANCELED			Ookini Arena, Osaka

30 January 2021; 13:00	Hisamitsu Springs	3–1	Hitachi Rivale	Green Arena, Kobe; Attendance: 650; Referees: Nana Yoshioka
30 January 2021; 13:00	(25-23, 28-26, 20-25, 25-23); Report A Report B			Green Arena, Kobe; Attendance: 650; Referees: Nana Yoshioka

30 January 2021; 15:00	Toray Arrows	3–2	NEC Red Rockets	Shiga Gymnasium, Otsu; Attendance: 0 Referees: Zeda
30 January 2021; 15:00	(19-25, 19-25, 25-23, 25-22, 15-12); Report A Report B			Shiga Gymnasium, Otsu; Attendance: 0 Referees: Zeda

30 January 2021; 16:00	Okayama Seagulls	3–1	Toyota Auto Body Queenseis	Green Arena, Kobe; Attendance: 590; Referees: Yasuo Chiyonobu
30 January 2021; 16:00	(25-20, 25-22, 21-25, 25-17); Report A Report B			Green Arena, Kobe; Attendance: 590; Referees: Yasuo Chiyonobu

31 January 2021; 12:00	Denso Airybees	0–3	PFU BlueCats	Shiga Gymnasium, Otsu; Attendance: 0 Referees: Zeda
31 January 2021; 12:00	(22-25, 23-25, 17-25); Report A Report B			Shiga Gymnasium, Otsu; Attendance: 0 Referees: Zeda

31 January 2021; 13:00	Hisamitsu Springs	3–0	Toyota Auto Body Queenseis	Green Arena, Kobe; Attendance: 450; Referees: Yasuo Chiyonobu
31 January 2021; 13:00	(25-22, 25-22, 25-11); Report A Report B			Green Arena, Kobe; Attendance: 450; Referees: Yasuo Chiyonobu

31 January 2021; 13:00	JT Marvelous	3–1	Kurobe AquaFairies	Shiga Gymnasium, Otsu; Attendance: 358; Referees: Tomohito Castle
31 January 2021; 13:00	(22-25, 25-18, 25-17, 25-21); Report A Report B			Shiga Gymnasium, Otsu; Attendance: 358; Referees: Tomohito Castle

31 January 2021; 15:00	Toray Arrows	3–0	Himeji Victorina	Shiga Gymnasium, Otsu; Attendance: 0 Referees: Mikako Masuoka
31 January 2021; 15:00	( 25-20, 25-23, 26-24); Report A Report B			Shiga Gymnasium, Otsu; Attendance: 0 Referees: Mikako Masuoka

31 January 2021; 15:30	Okayama Seagulls	3–1	Hitachi Rivale	Green Arena, Kobe; Attendance: 340; Referees: Nana Yoshioka
31 January 2021; 15:30	(25-16, 25-22, 18-25, 25-21); Report A Report B			Green Arena, Kobe; Attendance: 340; Referees: Nana Yoshioka

Week 6

06 February 2021; 12:00	Saitama Ageo Medics	3–1	Denso Airybees	Hitachinaka Sports Facility (ja); Attendance: 0 Referees: Mikako Masuoka
06 February 2021; 12:00	(24-26, 25-23, 25-19, 25-23); Report A Report B			Hitachinaka Sports Facility (ja); Attendance: 0 Referees: Mikako Masuoka

06 February 2021; 12:00	Toyota Auto Body Queenseis	0–3	NEC Red Rockets	Sky Hall Toyota; Attendance: 0 Referees: Satomi Naito
06 February 2021; 12:00	(17-25, 13-25, 15-25); Report A Report B			Sky Hall Toyota; Attendance: 0 Referees: Satomi Naito

06 February 2021; 13:00	Himeji Victorina	3–0	Okayama Seagulls	Wink Gymnasium, Himeji; Attendance: 557; Referees: Junichi Hayashi
06 February 2021; 13:00	(25-20, 25-23, 25-14); Report A Report B			Wink Gymnasium, Himeji; Attendance: 557; Referees: Junichi Hayashi

06 February 2021; 15:00	Hitachi Rivale	0–3	JT Marvelous	Hitachinaka Sports Facility (ja); Attendance: 0 Referees: Toshie Akai
06 February 2021; 15:00	(24-26, 19-25, 22-25); Report A Report B			Hitachinaka Sports Facility (ja); Attendance: 0 Referees: Toshie Akai

06 February 2021; 15:00	Toray Arrows	3–1	Kurobe AquaFairies	Sky Hall Toyota; Attendance: 0 Referees: Nana Yoshioka
06 February 2021; 15:00	(25-20, 25-20, 23-25, 25-22); Report A Report B			Sky Hall Toyota; Attendance: 0 Referees: Nana Yoshioka

06 February 2021; 16:00	Hisamitsu Springs	v	PFU BlueCats	Wink Gymnasium, Himeji
06 February 2021; 16:00	(Event is canceled due to coronavirus); CANCELED			Wink Gymnasium, Himeji

07 February 2021; 12:00	JT Marvelous	3–2	Denso Airybees	Hitachinaka Sports Facility (ja); Attendance: 0 Referees: Toshie Akai
07 February 2021; 12:00	(23-25, 21-25, 25-21, 25-18, 15-9); Report A Report B			Hitachinaka Sports Facility (ja); Attendance: 0 Referees: Toshie Akai

07 February 2021; 12:00	Toyota Auto Body Queenseis	0–3	Toray Arrows	Sky Hall Toyota; Attendance: 0 Referees: Taisuke Togawa
07 February 2021; 12:00	(22-25, 13-25, 14-25); Report A Report B			Sky Hall Toyota; Attendance: 0 Referees: Taisuke Togawa

07 February 2021; 12:00	Okayama Seagulls	1–3	Hisamitsu Springs	Wink Gymnasium, Himeji; Attendance: 620; Referees: Yasuo Chiyonobu
07 February 2021; 12:00	(13-25, 22-25, 25-17, 19-25); Report A Report B			Wink Gymnasium, Himeji; Attendance: 620; Referees: Yasuo Chiyonobu

07 February 2021; 12:00	Himeji Victorina	v	PFU BlueCats	Wink Gymnasium, Himeji
07 February 2021; 12:00	(Event is canceled due to coronavirus); CANCELED			Wink Gymnasium, Himeji

07 February 2021; 15:00	Hitachi Rivale	0–3	Saitama Ageo Medics	Hitachinaka Sports Facility (ja); Attendance: 0 Referees: Takeshi Eshita
07 February 2021; 15:00	(20-25, 18-25, 23-25); Report A Report B			Hitachinaka Sports Facility (ja); Attendance: 0 Referees: Takeshi Eshita

07 February 2021; 15:00	NEC Red Rockets	3–0	Kurobe AquaFairies	Sky Hall Toyota; Attendance: 0 Referees: Nana Yoshioka
07 February 2021; 15:00	(25-7, 25-19, 25-16); Report A Report B			Sky Hall Toyota; Attendance: 0 Referees: Nana Yoshioka

Week 7

13 February 2021; 12:00	Hitachi Rivale	3–2	Himeji Victorina	E. Plaza Ishikawa; Attendance: 0 Referees: Mikako Masuoka
13 February 2021; 12:00	(15-25, 25-22, 21-25, 25-22, 15-9); Report A Report B			E. Plaza Ishikawa; Attendance: 0 Referees: Mikako Masuoka

13 February 2021; 13:00	JT Marvelous	3–0	Toyota Auto Body Queenseis	Baycom Gymnasium, Amagasaki (ja); Attendance: 620; Referees: Shin Yamamoto
13 February 2021; 13:00	(25-17, 25-23, 25-21); Report A Report B			Baycom Gymnasium, Amagasaki (ja); Attendance: 620; Referees: Shin Yamamoto

13 February 2021; 15:00	PFU BlueCats	v	Kurobe AquaFairies	E. Plaza Ishikawa
13 February 2021; 15:00	(Event is canceled due to coronavirus); CANCELED			E. Plaza Ishikawa

13 February 2021; 15:30	Okayama Seagulls	2–3	Denso Airybees	Baycom Gymnasium, Amagasaki (ja); Attendance: 560; Referees: Nana Yoshioka
13 February 2021; 15:30	(23-25, 17-25, 25-15, 25-19, 10-15); Report A Report B			Baycom Gymnasium, Amagasaki (ja); Attendance: 560; Referees: Nana Yoshioka

14 February 2021; 11:00	Saitama Ageo Medics	3–1	NEC Red Rockets	E. Plaza Ishikawa; Attendance: 0 Referees: Taisuke Togawa
14 February 2021; 11:00	(24-26, 25-22, 25-22, 25-21); Report A Report B			E. Plaza Ishikawa; Attendance: 0 Referees: Taisuke Togawa

14 February 2021; 13:05	JT Marvelous	0–3	Toray Arrows	Baycom Gymnasium, Amagasaki (ja); Attendance: 871; Referees: Toshie Akai
14 February 2021; 13:05	(14-25, 20-25, 30-32); Report A Report B			Baycom Gymnasium, Amagasaki (ja); Attendance: 871; Referees: Toshie Akai

14 February 2021; 14:05	PFU BlueCats	3–1	Hitachi Rivale	E. Plaza Ishikawa; Attendance: 0 Referees: Ken Nakayama
14 February 2021; 14:05	(25-16, 18-25, 25-15, 25-18); Report A Report B			E. Plaza Ishikawa; Attendance: 0 Referees: Ken Nakayama

14 February 2021; 15:30	Denso Airybees	3–2	Hisamitsu Springs	Baycom Gymnasium, Amagasaki (ja); Attendance: 702; Referees: Junichi Hayashi
14 February 2021; 15:30	(16-25, 25-22, 22-25, 26-24, 15-9); Report A Report B			Baycom Gymnasium, Amagasaki (ja); Attendance: 702; Referees: Junichi Hayashi

== Final stage ==
Final ranking matches: 1st to 4th place held on February 20 and 21, 2021 at Ota Ward Gymnasium, Tokyo.

Semifinals
February 20
Toray Arrows	3
Denso Airybees	0
February 20
JT Marvelous	3
NEC Red Rockets	2

Final
February 21
Toray Arrows	1
JT Marvelous	3
3rd-place match
February 21
Denso Airybees	1
NEC Red Rockets	3

Match results

20 February 2021; 12:30	Toray Arrows	3–0	Denso Airybees	Ota Ward Gymnasium, Tokyo; Attendance: 829; Referees: Takeshi Eshita
20 February 2021; 12:30	(25-16, 25-23, 25-20); Report A Report B			Ota Ward Gymnasium, Tokyo; Attendance: 829; Referees: Takeshi Eshita

20 February 2021; 15:00	JT Marvelous	3–2	NEC Red Rockets	Ota Ward Gymnasium, Tokyo; Attendance: 1,116; Referees: Shin Yamamoto
20 February 2021; 15:00	(29-27, 25-21, 23-25, 15-25, 15-12); Report A Report B			Ota Ward Gymnasium, Tokyo; Attendance: 1,116; Referees: Shin Yamamoto

21 February 2021; 12:30	Denso Airybees	1–3	NEC Red Rockets	Ota Ward Gymnasium, Tokyo; Attendance: 651; Referees: Hiroyuki Hara
21 February 2021; 12:30	(25-19, 14-25, 21-25, 19-25); Report A Report B			Ota Ward Gymnasium, Tokyo; Attendance: 651; Referees: Hiroyuki Hara

21 February 2021; 17:00	Toray Arrows	1–3	JT Marvelous	Ota Ward Gymnasium, Tokyo; Attendance: 836; Referees: Toshie Akai
21 February 2021; 17:00	(25-23, 21-25, 21-25, 20-25); Report A Report B			Ota Ward Gymnasium, Tokyo; Attendance: 836; Referees: Toshie Akai

Final ranking matches: 5th-8th held on February 20 and 21, 2021 at Saitama Budokan, Ageo (ja).

1st round
February 20
Saitama Ageo Medics	3
Hitachi Rivale	1
February 20
Okayama Seagulls	3
Hisamitsu Springs	0

5th-place match
February 21
Saitama Ageo Medics	3
Okayama Seagulls	1
7th-place match
February 21
Hitachi Rivale	3
Hisamitsu Springs	2

Match results

20 February 2021; 12:30	Saitama Ageo Medics	3–1	Hitachi Rivale	Saitama Budokan, Ageo (ja); Attendance: 399; Referees: Taisuke Togawa
20 February 2021; 12:30	(25-23, 21-25, 26-24, 25-14); Report A Report B			Saitama Budokan, Ageo (ja); Attendance: 399; Referees: Taisuke Togawa

20 February 2021; 15:30	Okayama Seagulls	3–0	Hisamitsu Springs	Saitama Budokan, Ageo (ja); Attendance: 507; Referees: Yui Asai
20 February 2021; 15:30	(25-17, 25-19, 25-19); Report A Report B			Saitama Budokan, Ageo (ja); Attendance: 507; Referees: Yui Asai

21 February 2021; 12:30	Hitachi Rivale	3–2	Hisamitsu Springs	Saitama Budokan, Ageo (ja); Attendance: 357; Referees: Yuka Tsushima
21 February 2021; 12:30	(25-19, 23-25, 14-25, 28-26, 17-15); Report A Report B			Saitama Budokan, Ageo (ja); Attendance: 357; Referees: Yuka Tsushima

21 February 2021; 15:30	Saitama Ageo Medics	3–1	Okayama Seagulls	Saitama Budokan, Ageo (ja); Attendance: 218; Referees: Yui Asai
21 February 2021; 15:30	(17-25, 25-23, 25-20, 25-20); Report A Report B			Saitama Budokan, Ageo (ja); Attendance: 218; Referees: Yui Asai

Final ranking matches: 9th-12th held on February 20 and 21, 2021, in a remote match at Ikenokawa Sakura Arena, Hitachi.

1st round
February 20
Toyota Auto Body Queenseis	2
Himeji Victorina	3
February 20
PFU BlueCats	3
Kurobe AquaFairies	1

9th-place match
February 21
Himeji Victorina	1
PFU BlueCats	3
11th-place match
February 21
Toyota Auto Body Queenseis	3
Kurobe AquaFairies	1

Match results

20 February 2021; 12:30	Toyota Auto Body Queenseis	2–3	Himeji Victorina	Ikenokawa Sakura Arena, Hitachi; Attendance: 0 Referees: Satomi Naito
20 February 2021; 12:30	(33-35, 25-19, 20-25, 25-19, 10-15); Report A Report B			Ikenokawa Sakura Arena, Hitachi; Attendance: 0 Referees: Satomi Naito

20 February 2021; 15:30	PFU BlueCats	3–1	Kurobe AquaFairies	Ikenokawa Sakura Arena, Hitachi; Attendance: 0 Referees: Mikako Masuoka
20 February 2021; 15:30	(25-10, 22-25, 25-15, 25-19); Report A Report B			Ikenokawa Sakura Arena, Hitachi; Attendance: 0 Referees: Mikako Masuoka

21 February 2021; 12:30	Toyota Auto Body Queenseis	3–1	Kurobe AquaFairies	Ikenokawa Sakura Arena, Hitachi; Attendance: 0 Referees: Tatsumi Sawa
21 February 2021; 12:30	(21-25, 25-22, 25-22, 25-20); Report A Report B			Ikenokawa Sakura Arena, Hitachi; Attendance: 0 Referees: Tatsumi Sawa

21 February 2021; 15:30	Himeji Victorina	1–3	PFU BlueCats	Ikenokawa Sakura Arena, Hitachi; Attendance: 0 Referees: Nana Yoshioka
21 February 2021; 15:30	(15-25, 25-23, 25-27, 18-25); Report A Report B			Ikenokawa Sakura Arena, Hitachi; Attendance: 0 Referees: Nana Yoshioka

== Final standing ==
Rank	Club
1st place, gold medalist(s)	JT Marvelous
2nd place, silver medalist(s)	Toray Arrows
3rd place, bronze medalist(s)	NEC Red Rockets
4	Denso Airybees
5	Saitama Ageo Medics
6	Okayama Seagulls
7	Hitachi Rivale
8	Hisamitsu Springs
9	PFU BlueCats
10	Himeji Victorina
11	Toyota Auto Body Queenseis
12	Kurobe AquaFairies

Qualified for the 2021 Asian Women's Club Volleyball Championship

2020–21 V.League Division 1 Women's Champions
JT Marvelous

Team roster
Setter: Aki Momii, Mika Shibata

Libero: Mako Kobata, Tomoyo Fukagaya
MB: Aika Akutagawa, Anna Ogawa, Thatdao Nuekjang, Risa Hashimoto, Sakura Kanda, Nana Sakakibara, Marina Takahashi
OP: Andrea Drews
OH: Hickman Jahstice, Kotona Hayashi, Mizuki Tanaka, Yuka Meguro, Yuka Kutsui, Yuki Nishikawa, Yukiko Wada

Head Coach: Tomoko Yoshihara

== Awards ==
=== Regular round ===
- Best scorer
  - (Azerbaijan) Jana Kulan (Toray Arrows)
- Best spiker
  - (Japan) Haruyo Shimamura (NEC Red Rockets)
- Best blocker
  - (United States) Foluke Akinradewo (Hisamitsu Springs)
  - (Japan) Erika Araki (Toyota Auto Body Queenseis)
- Best server
  - (Japan) Misaki Yamauchi (NEC Red Rockets)
- Best receiver
  - (Japan) Mako Kobata (JT Marvelous)
- V.League Special Award (Note: For playing more than 10 seasons and more than 230 games)
  - (Japan) Haruyo Shimamura (NEC Red Rockets)
  - (Japan) Nana Iwasaka (Hisamitsu Springs)
  - (Japan) Yuki Ishii (Hisamitsu Springs)
- V.League Distinguished Service Award (Note: For being active as a core player for 11 seasons and set a Japanese record (70.0%) in serve receive success rate)
  - (Japan) Risa Shinnabe (Hisamitsu Springs)

=== Final stage ===
- Most valuable player
  - (Japan) Mako Kobata (JT Marvelous)
- Best Six
  - (Japan) Sarina Koga (NEC Red Rockets)
  - (Azerbaijan) Jana Kulan (Toray Arrows)
  - (Japan) Haruyo Shimamura (NEC Red Rockets)
  - (United States) Andrea Drews (JT Marvelous)
  - (Japan) Nanami Seki (Toray Arrows)
  - (United States) Foluke Akinradewo (Hisamitsu Springs)
- Best libero
  - (Japan) Mako Kobata (JT Marvelous)
- Receive Award
  - (Japan) Kotona Hayashi (JT Marvelous)
- Fighting Spirit Award
  - (Japan) Ai Kurogo (Toray Arrows)
- Best Newcomer Award
  - (Japan) Mami Yokota (Denso Airybees)
- Fair play award
  - (Japan) Mizuki Tanaka (JT Marvelous)
- Director Award
  - (Japan) Tomoko Yoshihara (JT Marvelous)
- Matsudaira Yasutaka Award
  - (Japan) Tomoko Yoshihara (JT Marvelous)

== V Cup ==
=== Qualifying round ===
Twelve teams will be divided into two groups and a round-robin qualifying round will be held.

Group A: JT Marvelous, Okayama Seagulls, Denso Airybees, Toyota Auto Body Queenseis, Hisamitsu Springs, Himeji Victorina
Group B: Saitama Ageo Medics, Toray Arrows, NEC Red Rockets, Hitachi Rivale, Kurobe AquaFairies, PFU BlueCats

1. The top two teams of each group (four teams in total) will perform the semifinal. The winners of the semifinals advance to the final, and the losers of the semifinal advance to the bronze-medal match.
2. The ranking of the teams that do not advance to the final round will be determined by the results of the preliminary round: 5th, 7th, 9th and 11th. There will be no ranking match between group A and group B.
3. The ranking of the qualifying round will be the team with the most wins.
4. If there is a variation in the number of games played within the group, the team with the highest winning percentage will be ranked higher.
5. Tiebreakers are Set Rate, then Points Rate.
6. In the event of a coronavirus positive person (including) of the participating team, or a refusal to participate due to any circumstances, the result is [0-25, 0-25, 0-25].
7. If a team abstains for any reason, they will lose [0-25, 0-25, 0-25].

Results of the qualifying round

Advance to semifinals

Group A
#	Team	Wins	Losses	Points	Win Rate	Sets W	Sets L	Sets Ratio	Points W	Points L	Points Ratio
1	Hisamitsu Springs	5	0	15	1.00	15	4	3.75	461	396	1.16
2	JT Marvelous	4	1	11	0.80	13	8	1.62	483	452	1.07
3	Denso Airybees	3	2	9	0.60	11	6	1.83	405	358	1.13
4	Okayama Seagulls	2	3	5	0.40	8	11	0.73	409	415	0.99
5	Himeji Victorina	1	4	3	0.20	4	12	0.33	328	380	0.86
6	Toyota Auto Body Queenseis	0	5	2	0.00	5	15	0.33	376	461	0.82

Group B
#	Team	Wins	Losses	Points	Win Rate	Sets W	Sets L	Sets Ratio	Points W	Points L	Points Ratio
1	Saitama Ageo Medics	5	0	15	1.00	15	2	7.50	413	258	1.60
2	NEC Red Rockets	4	1	11	0.80	12	7	1.71	433	335	1.29
3	Hitachi Rivale	3	2	9	0.60	11	8	1.38	421	336	1.25
4	Toray Arrows	2	3	7	0.40	10	9	1.11	400	355	1.13
5	Kurobe AquaFairies	1	4	2	0.20	5	14	0.36	365	447	0.82
6	PFU BlueCats	0	5	1	0.00	2	15	0.13	104	405	0.26

Match results

Week 1

27 February 2021; 11:00	Toray Arrows	3–0	PFU BlueCats	Saitama Budokan, Ageo (ja); Attendance: 0
27 February 2021; 11:00	(25–0, 25–0, 25–0); Event is canceled due to coronavirus			Saitama Budokan, Ageo (ja); Attendance: 0

27 February 2021; 11:00	Denso Airybees	1–3	JT Marvelous	Okazaki Park Gymnasium, Okazaki; Attendance: 0 Referees: Shin Yamamoto
27 February 2021; 11:00	(17-25, 21-25, 27-25, 23-25); Report A Report B			Okazaki Park Gymnasium, Okazaki; Attendance: 0 Referees: Shin Yamamoto

27 February 2021; 12:00	NEC Red Rockets	3–1	Kurobe AquaFairies	Saitama Budokan, Ageo (ja); Attendance: 0 Referees: Taisuke Togawa
27 February 2021; 12:00	(23-25, 25-12, 25-17, 25-23); Report A Report B			Saitama Budokan, Ageo (ja); Attendance: 0 Referees: Taisuke Togawa

27 February 2021; 14:00	Okayama Seagulls	3–2	Toyota Auto Body Queenseis	Okazaki Park Gymnasium, Okazaki; Attendance: 0 Referees: Nana Yoshioka
27 February 2021; 14:00	(25-12, 25-22, 23-25, 18-25, 15-11); Report A Report B			Okazaki Park Gymnasium, Okazaki; Attendance: 0 Referees: Nana Yoshioka

27 February 2021; 14:30	Saitama Ageo Medics	3–0	Hitachi Rivale	Saitama Budokan, Ageo (ja); Attendance: 0 Referees: Toshie Akai
27 February 2021; 14:30	(25-19, 25-15, 25-21); Report A Report B			Saitama Budokan, Ageo (ja); Attendance: 0 Referees: Toshie Akai

27 February 2021; 17:00	Hisamitsu Springs	3–0	Himeji Victorina	Okazaki Park Gymnasium, Okazaki; Attendance: 0 Referees: Satomi Naito
27 February 2021; 17:00	(25-20, 25-20, 25-22); Report A Report B			Okazaki Park Gymnasium, Okazaki; Attendance: 0 Referees: Satomi Naito

28 February 2021; 11:00	NEC Red Rockets	3–2	Hitachi Rivale	Saitama Budokan, Ageo (ja); Attendance: 0 Referees: Taisuke Togawa
28 February 2021; 11:00	(26-28, 20-25, 25-15, 25-21, 17-15); Report A Report B			Saitama Budokan, Ageo (ja); Attendance: 0 Referees: Taisuke Togawa

28 February 2021; 12:00	Denso Airybees	3–0	Toyota Auto Body Queenseis	Okazaki Park Gymnasium, Okazaki; Attendance: 0 Referees: Nana Yoshioka
28 February 2021; 12:00	(25-12, 25-10, 26-24); Report A Report B			Okazaki Park Gymnasium, Okazaki; Attendance: 0 Referees: Nana Yoshioka

28 February 2021; 13:00	Saitama Ageo Medics	3–0	PFU BlueCats	Saitama Budokan, Ageo (ja); Attendance: 0
28 February 2021; 13:00	(25–0, 25–0, 25–0); Event is canceled due to coronavirus			Saitama Budokan, Ageo (ja); Attendance: 0

28 February 2021; 15:00	Okayama Seagulls	3–0	Himeji Victorina	Okazaki Park Gymnasium, Okazaki; Attendance: 0 Referees: Shin Yamamoto
28 February 2021; 15:00	(25-16, 25-23, 25-18); Report A Report B			Okazaki Park Gymnasium, Okazaki; Attendance: 0 Referees: Shin Yamamoto

Week 2

6 March 2021; 12:00	Kurobe AquaFairies	1–3	Saitama Ageo Medics	Toyama Seibu Sports Center, Tonami; Attendance: 620; Referees: Takeshi Eshita
6 March 2021; 12:00	(16-25, 18-25, 25-20, 23-25); Report A Report B			Toyama Seibu Sports Center, Tonami; Attendance: 620; Referees: Takeshi Eshita

6 March 2021; 13:00	Toray Arrows	1–3	NEC Red Rockets	Brex Arena, Utsunomiya; Attendance: 957; Referees: Toshie Akai
6 March 2021; 13:00	(15-25, 17-25, 25-22, 22-25); Report A Report B			Brex Arena, Utsunomiya; Attendance: 957; Referees: Toshie Akai

6 March 2021; 13:30	Okayama Seagulls	1–3	JT Marvelous	Sanyo Fureai Park, Akaiwa; Attendance: 600; Referees: Greg Luo
6 March 2021; 13:30	(14-25, 25-20, 20-25, 19-25); Report A Report B			Sanyo Fureai Park, Akaiwa; Attendance: 600; Referees: Greg Luo

6 March 2021; 14:30	Denso Airybees	3–0	Himeji Victorina	Toyama Seibu Sports Center, Tonami; Attendance: 610; Referees: Hiroaki Takahashi
6 March 2021; 14:30	(25-20, 25-16, 25-11); Report A Report B			Toyama Seibu Sports Center, Tonami; Attendance: 610; Referees: Hiroaki Takahashi

6 March 2021; 16:00	Toyota Auto Body Queenseis	1–3	Hisamitsu Springs	Sanyo Fureai Park, Akaiwa; Attendance: 350; Referees: Nana Yoshioka
6 March 2021; 16:00	(26-24, 20-25, 17-25, 17-25); Report A Report B			Sanyo Fureai Park, Akaiwa; Attendance: 350; Referees: Nana Yoshioka

7 March 2021; 13:00	Toray Arrows	2–3	Hitachi Rivale	Brex Arena, Utsunomiya; Attendance: 867; Referees: Yuka Tsushima
7 March 2021; 13:00	(27-25, 21-25, 14-25, 25-22, 13-15); Report A Report B			Brex Arena, Utsunomiya; Attendance: 867; Referees: Yuka Tsushima

7 March 2021; 13:00	Kurobe AquaFairies	3–2	PFU BlueCats	Toyama Seibu Sports Center, Tonami; Attendance: 760; Referees: Yuka Kitamura
7 March 2021; 13:00	(21-25, 25-20, 19-25, 25-21, 15-13); Report A Report B			Toyama Seibu Sports Center, Tonami; Attendance: 760; Referees: Yuka Kitamura

7 March 2021; 13:00	Okayama Seagulls	1–3	Hisamitsu Springs	Sanyo Fureai Park, Akaiwa; Attendance: 690; Referees: Masato Ono
7 March 2021; 13:00	(21-25, 25-16, 17-25, 21-25); Report A Report B			Sanyo Fureai Park, Akaiwa; Attendance: 690; Referees: Masato Ono

7 March 2021; 15:30	JT Marvelous	3–2	Toyota Auto Body Queenseis	Sanyo Fureai Park, Akaiwa; Attendance: 500; Referees: Akira Homma
7 March 2021; 15:30	(25-21, 25-20, 22-25, 18-25, 15-11); Report A Report B			Sanyo Fureai Park, Akaiwa; Attendance: 500; Referees: Akira Homma

Week 3

20 March 2021; 11:00	Okayama Seagulls	0–3	Denso Airybees	Shimadzu Arena, Kyoto (ja); Attendance: 678; Referees: Mikako Masuoka
20 March 2021; 11:00	(25-27, 20-25, 21-25); Report A Report B			Shimadzu Arena, Kyoto (ja); Attendance: 678; Referees: Mikako Masuoka

20 March 2021; 12:00	Saitama Ageo Medics	3–0	NEC Red Rockets	Tokorozawa Municipal Gymnasium; Attendance: 1014; Referees: Toshie Akai
20 March 2021; 12:00	(25-16, 25-11, 25-23); Report A Report B			Tokorozawa Municipal Gymnasium; Attendance: 1014; Referees: Toshie Akai

20 March 2021; 13:00	Hitachi Rivale	3–0	PFU BlueCats	Tokorozawa Municipal Gymnasium; Attendance: 0
20 March 2021; 13:00	(25–0, 25–0, 25–0); Event is canceled due to coronavirus			Tokorozawa Municipal Gymnasium; Attendance: 0

20 March 2021; 13:00	JT Marvelous	1–3	Hisamitsu Springs	Shimadzu Arena, Kyoto (ja); Attendance: 723; Referees: Yuka Kitamura
20 March 2021; 13:00	(25-22, 18-25, 21-25, 17-25); Report A Report B			Shimadzu Arena, Kyoto (ja); Attendance: 723; Referees: Yuka Kitamura

20 March 2021; 14:30	Toray Arrows	3–0	Kurobe AquaFairies	Tokorozawa Municipal Gymnasium; Attendance: 803; Referees: Ono General 小野将人
20 March 2021; 14:30	(25-19, 25-14, 25-20); Report A Report B			Tokorozawa Municipal Gymnasium; Attendance: 803; Referees: Ono General 小野将人

20 March 2021; 15:00	Toyota Auto Body Queenseis	0–3	Himeji Victorina	Shimadzu Arena, Kyoto (ja); Attendance: 752; Referees: Nana Yoshioka
20 March 2021; 15:00	(17-25, 16-25, 20-25); Report A Report B			Shimadzu Arena, Kyoto (ja); Attendance: 752; Referees: Nana Yoshioka

21 March 2021; 11:00	NEC Red Rockets	3–0	PFU BlueCats	Tokorozawa Municipal Gymnasium; Attendance: 0
21 March 2021; 11:00	(25–0, 25–0, 25–0); Event is canceled due to coronavirus			Tokorozawa Municipal Gymnasium; Attendance: 0

21 March 2021; 12:00	Denso Airybees	1–3	Hisamitsu Springs	Shimadzu Arena, Kyoto (ja); Attendance: 504; Referees: Hiroyuki Hara
21 March 2021; 12:00	(24-26, 21-25, 25-23, 19-25); Report A Report B			Shimadzu Arena, Kyoto (ja); Attendance: 504; Referees: Hiroyuki Hara

21 March 2021; 12:00	Hitachi Rivale	3–0	Kurobe AquaFairies	Tokorozawa Municipal Gymnasium; Attendance: 831; Referees: Yuka Tsushima
21 March 2021; 12:00	(25-13, 25-19, 25-16); Report A Report B			Tokorozawa Municipal Gymnasium; Attendance: 831; Referees: Yuka Tsushima

21 March 2021; 14:30	JT Marvelous	3–1	Himeji Victorina	Shimadzu Arena, Kyoto (ja); Attendance: 684; Referees: Yuka Kitamura
21 March 2021; 14:30	(25-22, 30-28, 22-25, 25-12); Report A Report B			Shimadzu Arena, Kyoto (ja); Attendance: 684; Referees: Yuka Kitamura

21 March 2021; 14:30	Saitama Ageo Medics	3–1	Toray Arrows	Tokorozawa Municipal Gymnasium; Attendance: 844; Referees: Yui Asai
21 March 2021; 14:30	(18-25, 25-16, 25-16, 25-14); Report A Report B			Tokorozawa Municipal Gymnasium; Attendance: 844; Referees: Yui Asai

=== Final stage ===
Held on March 27 and 28, 2021 at Ota Ward Gymnasium, Tokyo.

Semifinals
March 27
Hisamitsu Springs	2
NEC Red Rockets	3
March 27
Saitama Ageo Medics	3
JT Marvelous	2

Final
March 28
NEC Red Rockets	1
Saitama Ageo Medics	3
3rd-place match
March 28
Hisamitsu Springs	3
JT Marvelous	1

Match results

27 March 2021; 13:00	Hisamitsu Springs	2–3	NEC Red Rockets	Ota Ward Gymnasium, Tokyo; Attendance: 850; Referees: Nana Yoshioka
27 March 2021; 13:00	(25-23, 28-26, 24-26, 15-25, 12-15); Report A Report B			Ota Ward Gymnasium, Tokyo; Attendance: 850; Referees: Nana Yoshioka

27 March 2021; 16:00	Saitama Ageo Medics	3–2	JT Marvelous	Ota Ward Gymnasium, Tokyo; Attendance: 500; Referees: Toshie Akai
27 March 2021; 16:00	(25-21, 25-22, 18-25, 18-25, 15-13); Report A Report B			Ota Ward Gymnasium, Tokyo; Attendance: 500; Referees: Toshie Akai

28 March 2021; 13:00	Hisamitsu Springs	3–1	JT Marvelous	Ota Ward Gymnasium, Tokyo; Attendance: 750; Referees: Satomi Naito
28 March 2021; 13:00	(25-21, 18-25, 26-24, 25-14); Report A Report B			Ota Ward Gymnasium, Tokyo; Attendance: 750; Referees: Satomi Naito

28 March 2021; 16:00	NEC Red Rockets	1–3	Saitama Ageo Medics	Ota Ward Gymnasium, Tokyo; Attendance: 1,100; Referees: Yuka Kitamura
28 March 2021; 16:00	(24-26, 25-20, 21-25, 17-25); Report A Report B			Ota Ward Gymnasium, Tokyo; Attendance: 1,100; Referees: Yuka Kitamura

=== Final standing ===
#	Team
1st place, gold medalist(s)	Saitama Ageo Medics
2nd place, silver medalist(s)	NEC Red Rockets
3rd place, bronze medalist(s)	Hisamitsu Springs
4	JT Marvelous
5	Denso Airybees
5	Hitachi Rivale
7	Okayama Seagulls
7	Toray Arrows
9	Himeji Victorina
9	Kurobe AquaFairies
11	Toyota Auto Body Queenseis
11	PFU BlueCats

== V.Challenge Tournament ==
- V1 11th vs. V2 2nd (two matches)
- V1 12th vs. V2 1st (two matches)

If a V2 team does not have an S1 license, they will not play the tournament, and their V1 opponent remains in V1 unchallenged.

Teams with the most wins will qualify for next season's V1 League. In the case of 1 win and 1 loss, the following will be used as tiebreakers:

1. Points
2. Set rate
3. Score rate

Points are awarded as follows:

Conditions	Points awarded
Win by set count "3-0" or "3-1"	3 points
Win by set count "3-2"	2 points
Lose by set count "2-3"	1 point
Lose by set count "1-3" or "0-3"	0 points

V1/V2 V.Challenge match women's tournament held at Nagaoka Gymnasium on April 3 and 4, 2021.

V1 Women's 11th - V2 Women's 2nd

Pos	Team	Pld	W	L	Pts	SW	SL	SR	SPW	SPL	SPR	Qualification
1	Toyota Auto Body Queenseis	2	2	0	6	6	0	MAX	157	124	1.266	2021–22 V1 League
2	Brilliant Aries	2	0	2	0	0	6	0.000	124	157	0.790	

Match results

3 April 2021; 12:00	Toyota Auto Body Queenseis	3–0	Brilliant Aries	Nagaoka Gymnasium; Attendance: 585; Referees: Mikako Masuoka
3 April 2021; 12:00	(25-16, 25-15, 25-23); Report A Report B			Nagaoka Gymnasium; Attendance: 585; Referees: Mikako Masuoka

4 April 2021; 12:00	Toyota Auto Body Queenseis	3–0	Brilliant Aries	Nagaoka Gymnasium; Attendance: 643; Referees: Hiroaki Takahashi
4 April 2021; 12:00	(25-17, 32-30, 25-23); Report A Report B			Nagaoka Gymnasium; Attendance: 643; Referees: Hiroaki Takahashi

V1 Women's 12th - V2 Women's 1st

Pos	Team	Pld	W	L	Pts	SW	SL	SR	SPW	SPL	SPR	Qualification
1	Kurobe AquaFairies	2	2	0	6	6	1	6.000	170	137	1.241	2021–22 V1 League
2	Gunma Bank Green Wings	2	0	2	0	1	6	0.167	137	170	0.806	

Match results

3 April 2021; 15:00	Kurobe AquaFairies	3–0	Gunma Bank Green Wings	Nagaoka Gymnasium; Attendance: 627; Referees: Taisuke Togawa
3 April 2021; 15:00	(25-14, 25-20, 25-22); Report A Report B			Nagaoka Gymnasium; Attendance: 627; Referees: Taisuke Togawa

4 April 2021; 15:00	Kurobe AquaFairies	3–1	Gunma Bank Green Wings	Nagaoka Gymnasium; Attendance: 652; Referees: Yuka Kitamura
4 April 2021; 15:00	(20-25, 25-13, 25-23, 25-20); Report A Report B			Nagaoka Gymnasium; Attendance: 652; Referees: Yuka Kitamura

== All Star Game ==
All Star game was not held this year.

== See also ==
- 2020–21 V.League Division 1 Men's
