= Mai Yamaguchi =

Japanese volleyball player (born 1983)

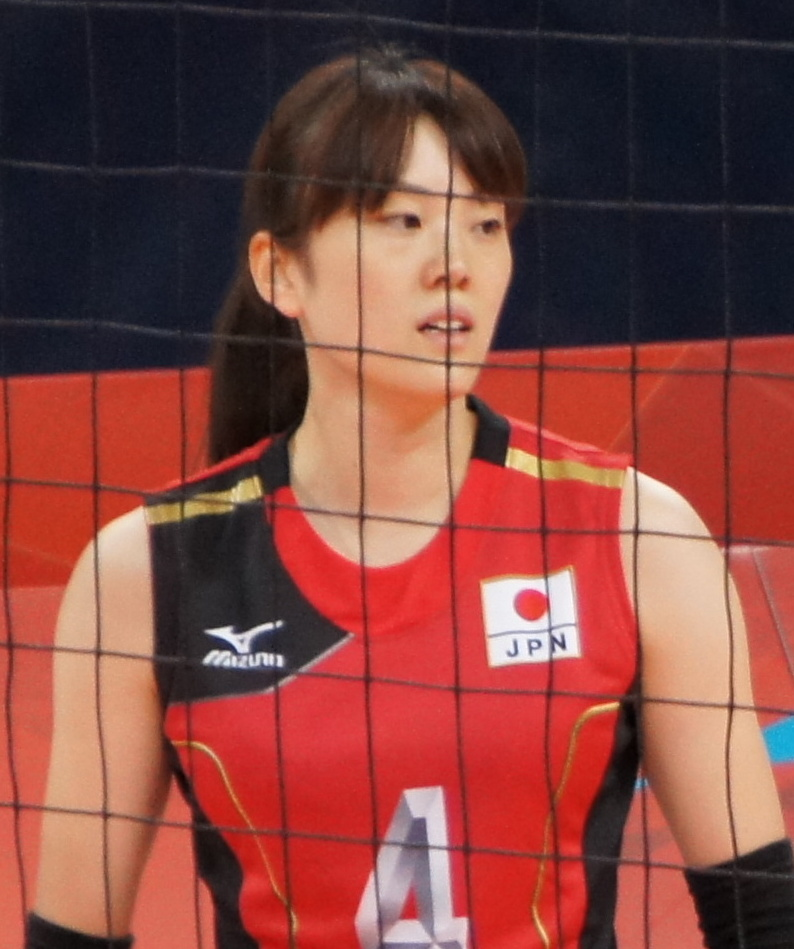

Personal information
- Full name: Mai Yamaguchi
- Nickname: Yume, Pearl
- Born: July 3, 1983 (age 43); Shima, Mie, Japan
- Height: 176 cm (5 ft 9 in)
- Weight: 62 kg (137 lb)
- Spike: 308 cm (121 in)
- Block: 300 cm (118 in)

Volleyball information
- Position: Wing Spiker/Middle Blocker
- Current club: Retired

National team
Japan
Medal record
Women's volleyball
Representing Japan
Olympic Games
Bronze medal – third place	2012 London	Team
World Championship
Bronze medal – third place	2010 Japan	Team
Asian Championship
Silver medal – second place	2011 Taipei

Mai Yamaguchi (山口 舞 Yamaguchi Mai, born July 3, 1983) is a former Japanese volleyball player who played for Okayama Seagulls. She was part of Japan's 2012 bronze medal-winning team.

Mai participated in the 2018 FIVB Volleyball Women's World Championship, which was her last international tournament with the national team. She announced her retirement from volleyball in 2019.

== Profile ==
Her nickname is "Yume", which means "dream" in Japanese. Another nickname is Pearl, which is locally farmed specialty of her hometown of Shima, in Mie prefecture. She liked knitting and cooking at the time of her bronze medal and she also enjoyed figure skating.

== Clubs ==
- (Japan) Osaka International Takii High School
- (Japan) Okayama Seagulls (2002-2019)

== National team ==
- (Japan) National team (2009-2018)

== Awards ==
=== Individual ===
- 2011–12 V.Premier League - Best 6
- 2013–14 V.Premier League - Best 6

=== Team ===
- 2005 Kurowashiki All Japan Volleyball Tournament - Runner-Up, with Okayama Seagulls
- 2002–06,08–11 Domestic Sports Festival (Volleyball) - Champion, with Okayama Seagulls
- 2012–13 V.Premier League - Bronze Medal with Okayama Seagulls
- 2013 Empress's Cup - Runner-up with Okayama Seagulls
- 2013–14 V.Premier League - Runner-up with Okayama Seagulls

=== National team ===
- 2010 World Championship - Bronze medal
- 2011 Asian Championship - Silver medal
- 2012 Olympics - Bronze medal
- 2014 FIVB World Grand Prix - Silver medal
