= Zip Arena Okayama =

Indoor sporting arena in Okayama, Japan

- Momotaro Arena
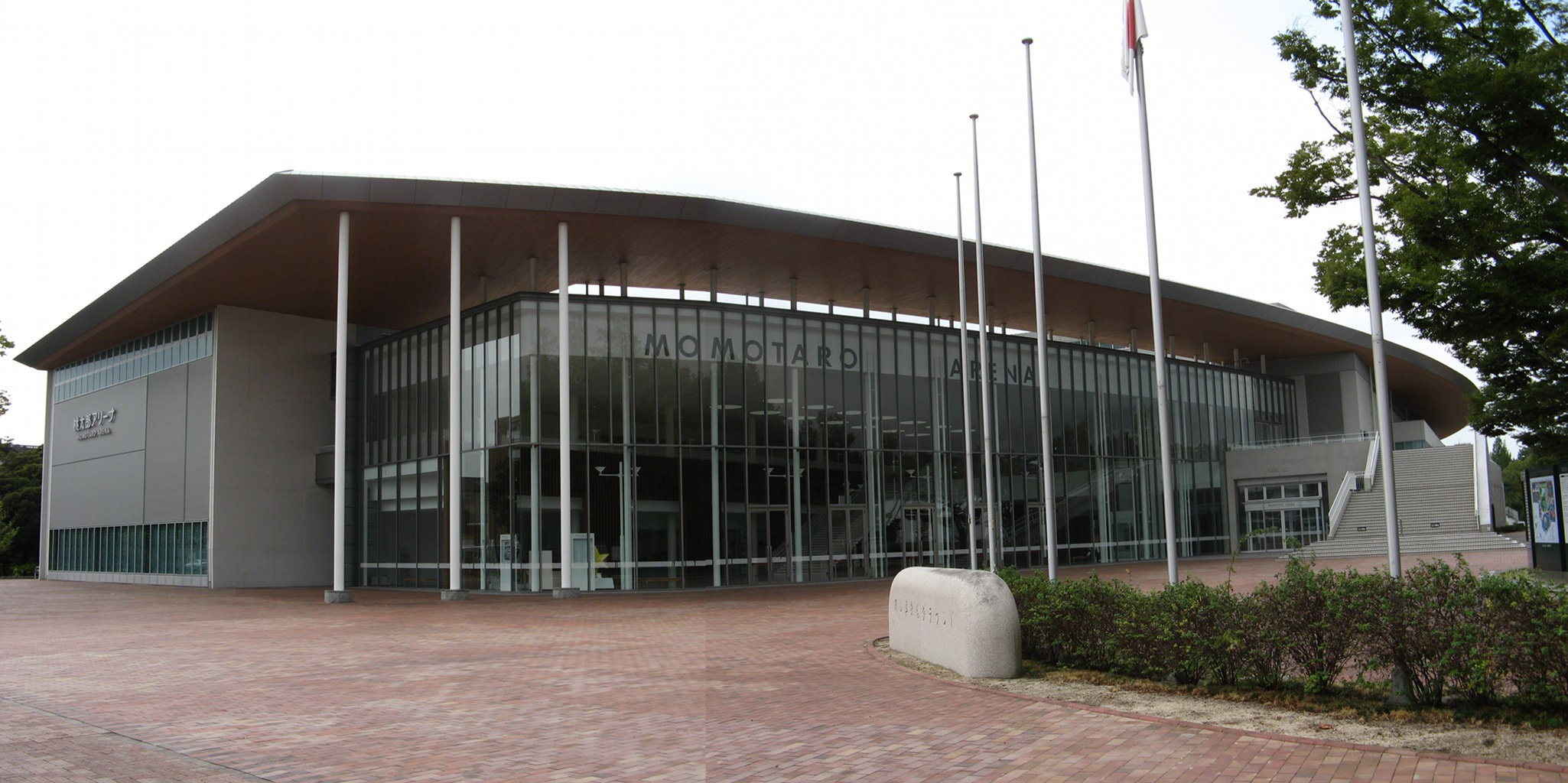

- Location within Japan
- Interactive map of Zip Arena Okayama
- Full name: Okayama-ken sōgō guraundo taiikukan
- Location: Okayama, Okayama Prefecture, Japan
- Coordinates: 34.678301°N 133.920240°E
- Owner: Okayama
- Operator: Okayama
- Capacity: 11,000

Construction
- Groundbreaking: 2005

Tenants
- Tryhoop Okayama; Okayama Seagulls (V.League)

Momotaro Arena (桃太郎アリーナ, Momotarō Arīna) is an indoor sporting arena located in Okayama, Japan. The arena is also known as the Okayama Prefectural Ground Gymnasium (岡山県総合グラウンド体育館, Okayama-ken sōgō guraundo taiikukan). The capacity of the arena is 11,000 spectators. It hosts the home matches of the Okayama Seagulls of the V.League.

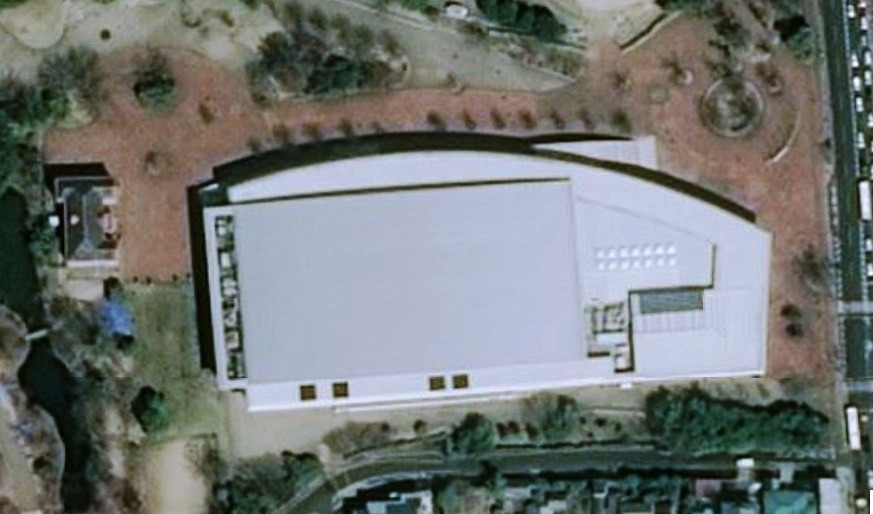
Satellite view
