= Fukuoka Citizens Gymnasium =

Sports venue in Fukuoka, Japan

Coordinates: 33°36′12.9″N 130°24′59.5″E

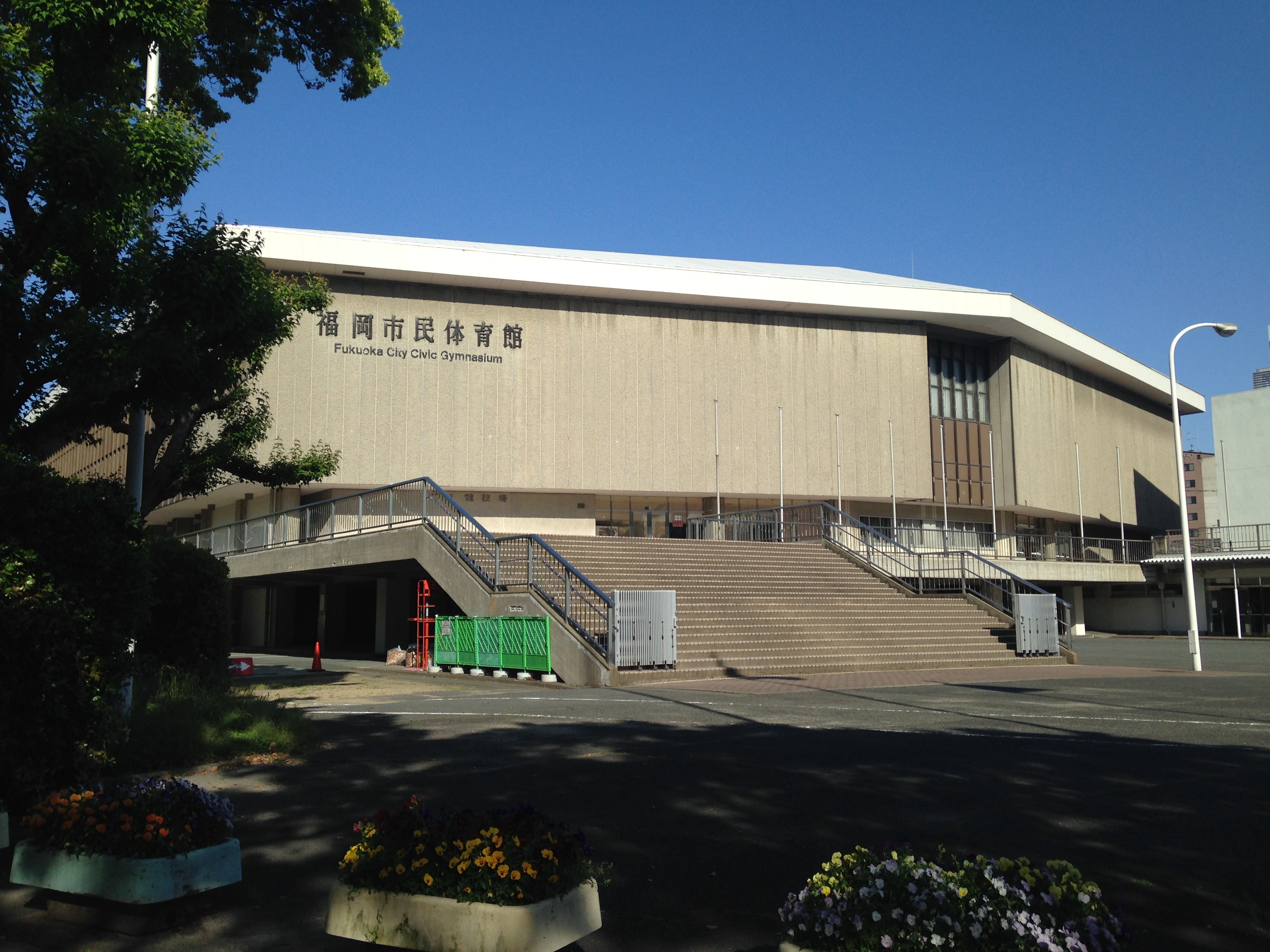
- Interactive map of Fukuoka Citizens Gymnasium
- Full name: Fukuoka Citizens Gymnasium
- Location: Hakata-ku, Fukuoka, Japan
- Owner: Fukuoka city
- Operator: Fukuoka city
- Capacity: 3,500

Construction
- Opened: 1972
- Cost

Tenant
- Rizing Zephyr Fukuoka

Website
- http://www.sports-fukuokacity.or.jp/facility/gym_fukuoka.html

Fukuoka Citizens Gymnasium is an arena in Fukuoka, Fukuoka, Japan. It is the home arena of the Rizing Zephyr Fukuoka of the B.League, Japan's professional basketball league.

== Facilities ==
- No. 1 gymnasium - 36m×49m
- No. 2 gymnasium - 21m×33m
- Swimming pool - 25m×7courses

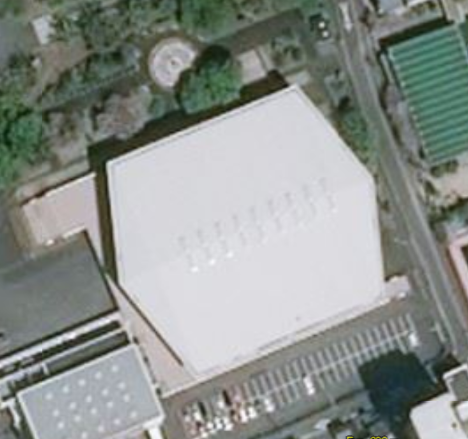
Satellite view

== Location map ==
Fukuoka Citizens Gymnasium (Fukuoka city)
