= Ukaruchan Arena =

Arena in Otsu, Shiga, Japan

Coordinates: 35°0′18″N 135°53′14.6″E

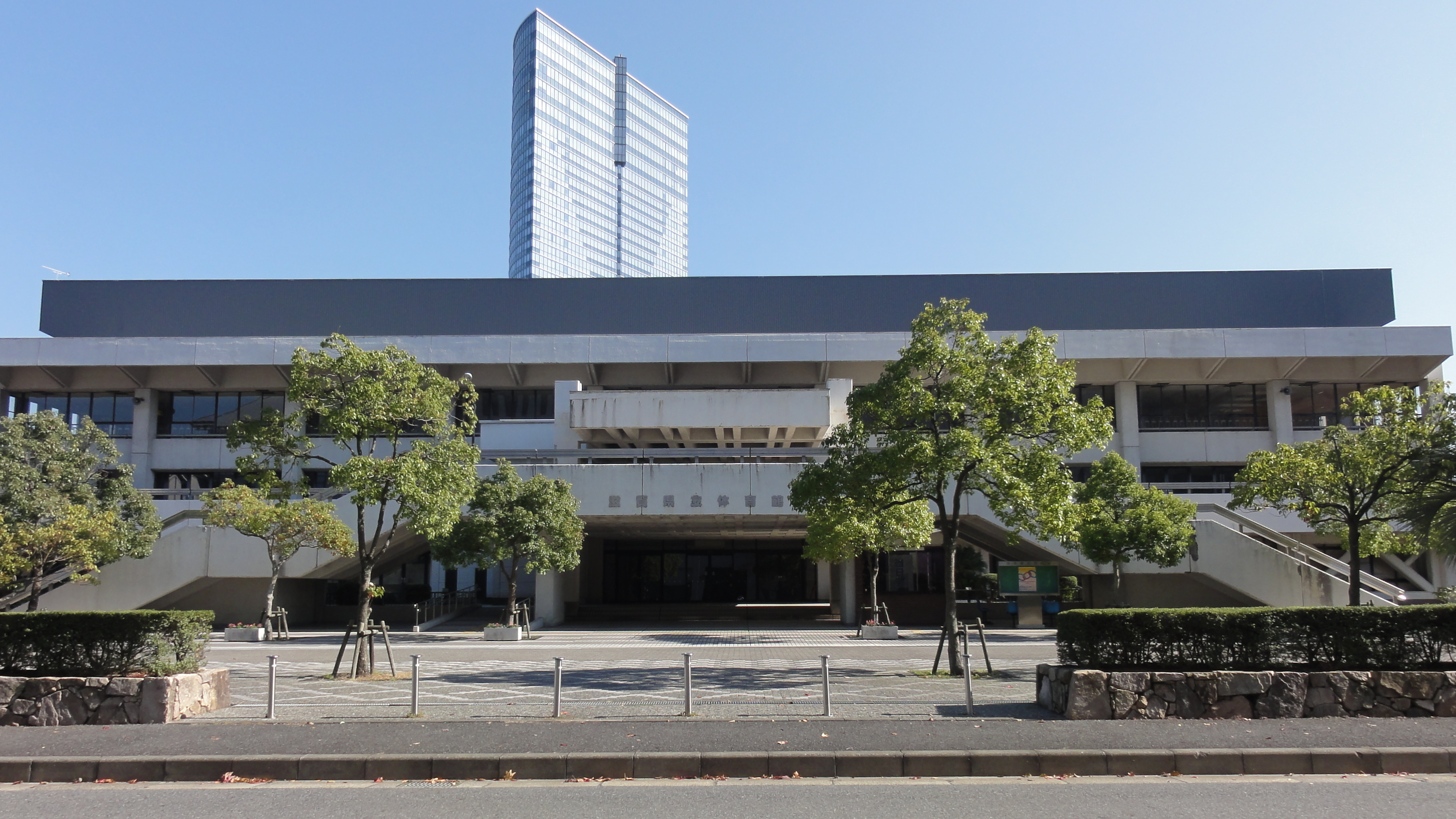

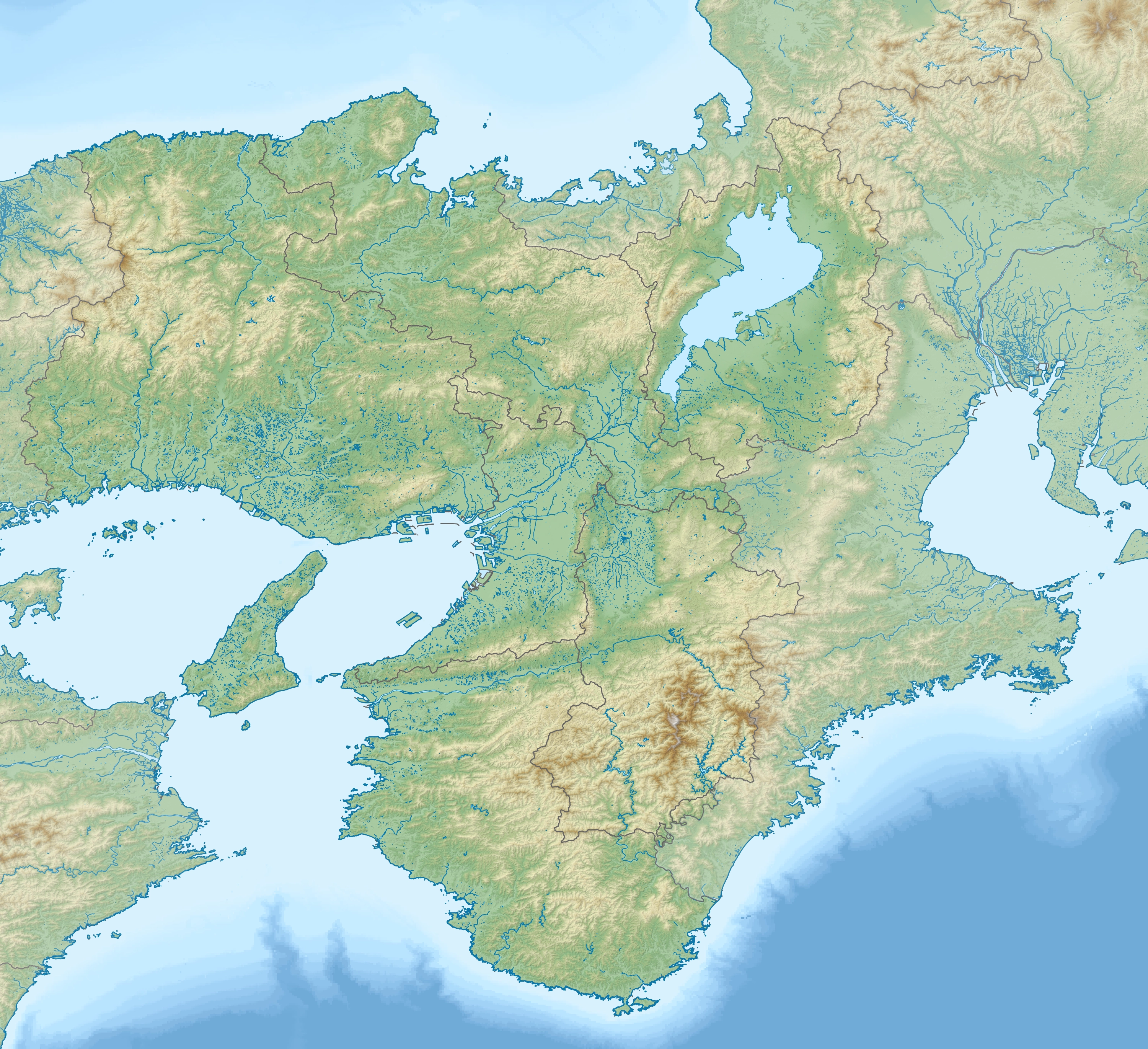
- Location within Kansai region Location within Japan
- Interactive map of Ukaruchan Arena
- Full name: Shiga Prefectural Gymnasium
- Location: Otsu, Shiga, Japan
- Owner: Shiga Prefecture
- Operator: Shiga Prefecture
- Capacity: 4,896
- Scoreboard: Centerhung scoreboard, Daktronics ribbon
- Parking: 57

Construction
- Opened: October, 1973
- Cost

Tenants
- Shiga Lakestars; Toray Arrows (women's volleyball team)

Website
- http://www.bsn.or.jp/gym/

Ukaruchan Arena is an arena in Otsu, Shiga, Japan. It is the home arena of the Shiga Lakestars of the B.League, Japan's professional basketball league.

== Facilities ==
- Main building – 1,890m^{2}（45m×42m）
- Annex – 858m^{2}（33m×26m）
- Sports square
- Running course – 180m
- Conference room

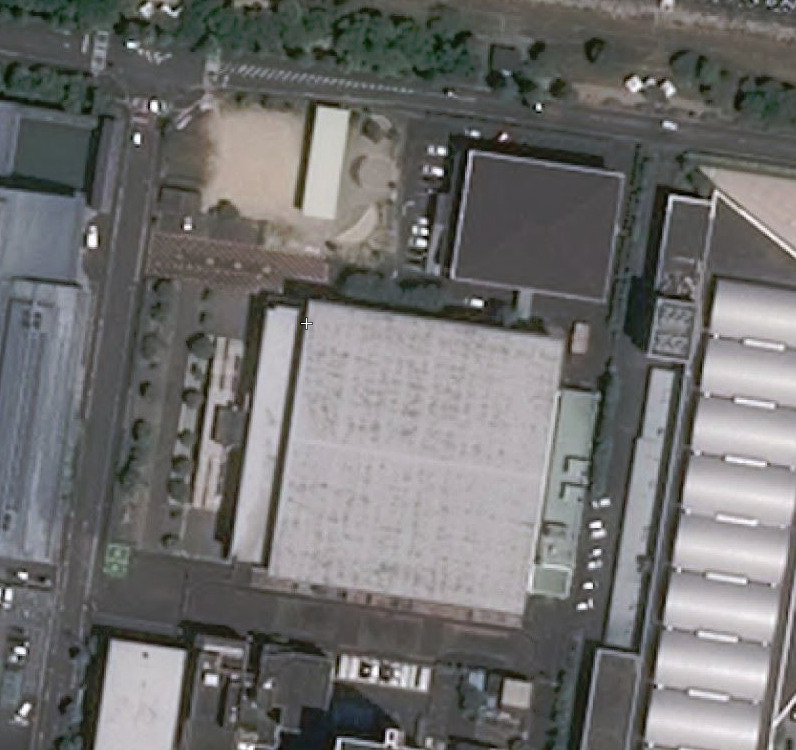
Satellite view
