= Toyama Seibu Sports Center =

Sports arena in Tonami, Japan

Coordinates: 36°38′32.6″N 137°0′1.2″E

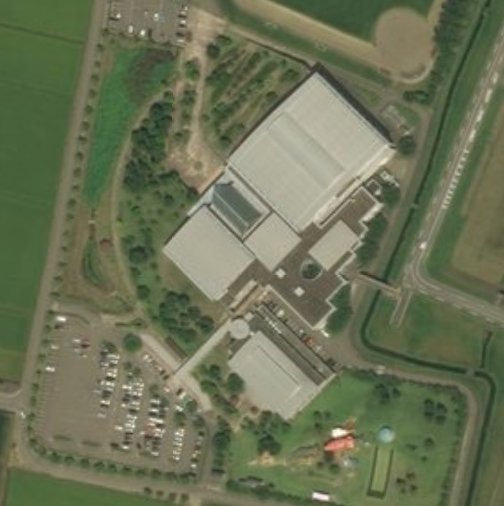
- Interactive map of Toyama Seibu Sports Center
- Full name: Toyama Prefectural Seibu Sports Center
- Location: Tonami, Toyama, Japan
- Owner: Toyama Prefecture
- Operator: Toyama Prefecture Sports Association
- Capacity: 2,628

Construction
- Opened: July 15, 1999
- Cost

Website
- http://www.sportsnet.pref.toyama.jp/member/seibu/index.html

Toyama Seibu Sports Center is an arena in Tonami, Toyama, Japan.

== Facilities ==
- Large arena - 50m×40m 2,000m^{2}
- Medium arena - 34m×29m 986m^{2}
- No. 1 Training room - 303m^{2}
- No. 2 Training room - 121m^{2}
- Sauna
