= Hitachi City Ikenokawa Sakura Arena =

Arena in Hitachi, Ibaraki, Japan

Coordinates: 36°34′36.6″N 140°38′52.6″E

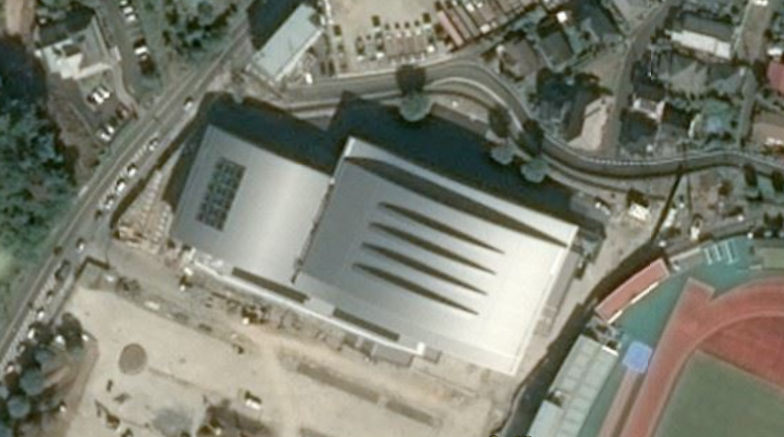
- Interactive map of Hitachi City Ikenokawa Sakura Arena
- Full name: Hitachi City Ikenokawa Sakura Arena
- Location: Hitachi, Ibaraki, Japan
- Owner: Hitachi city
- Operator: Hitachi city
- Capacity: 2,632
- Parking: 283 spaces

Construction
- Opened: January 21, 2017
- Cost
- Architect: Ishimoto

Website
- http://www.city.hitachi.lg.jp/shisetsu/010/001/arenaopen.html

Hitachi City Ikenokawa Sakura Arena is an arena in Hitachi, Ibaraki, Japan.
