= Saga Sunrise Park General Gymnasium =

Sports arena in Saga, Japan

Coordinates: 33°16′42.5″N 130°17′41.6″E

- SAGA Plaza
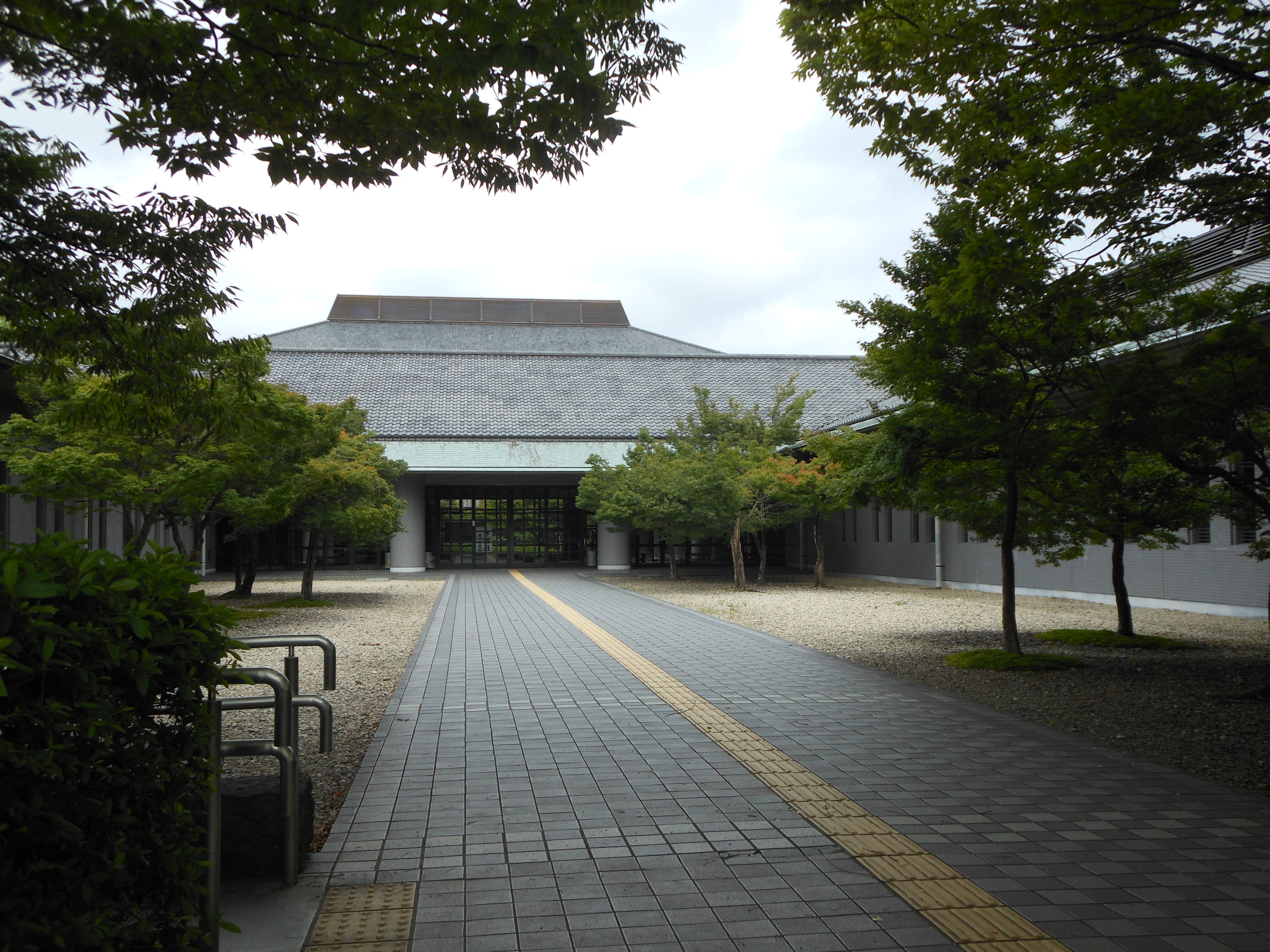

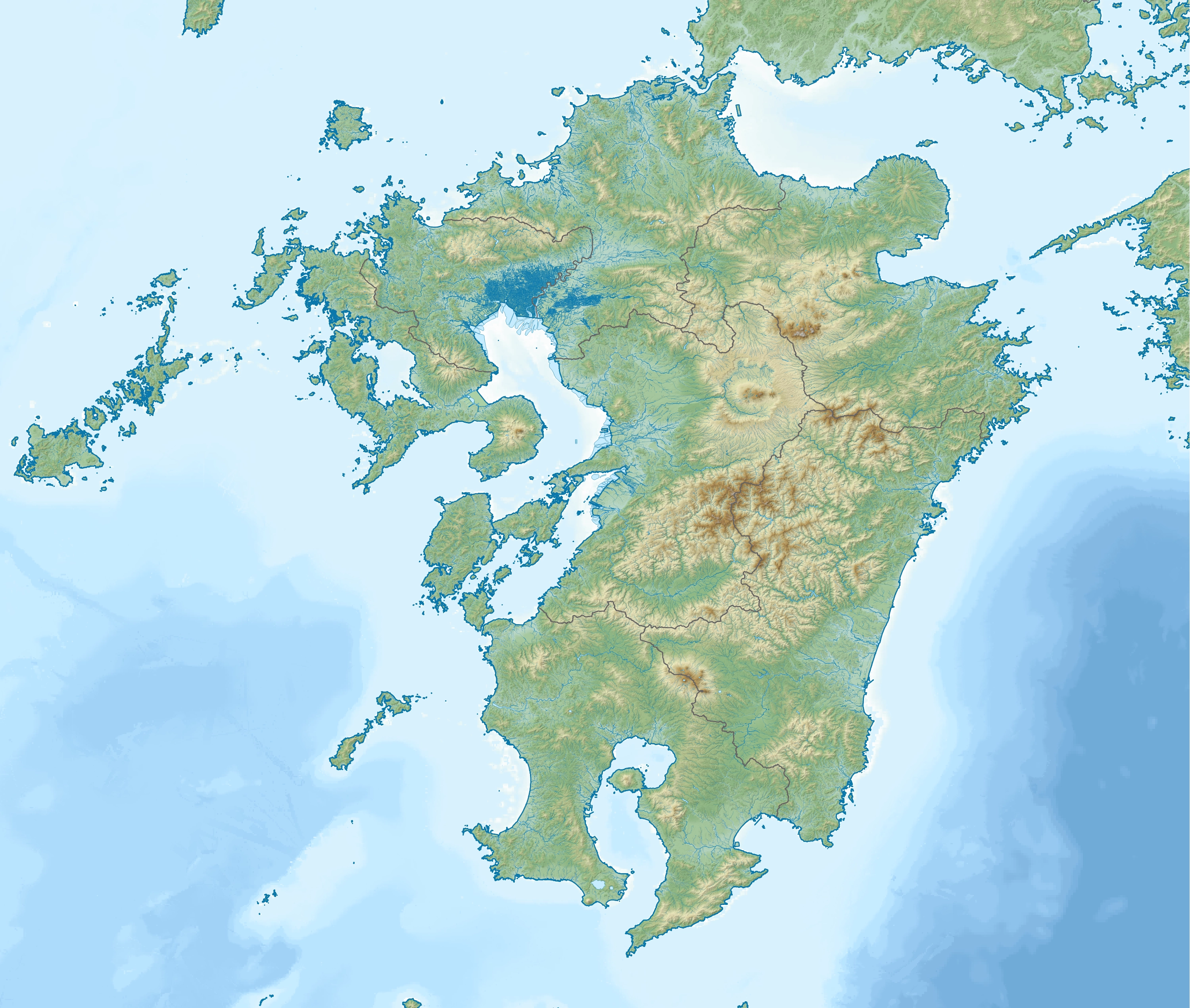
- Location within Saga Prefecture Location within Kyushu Location within Japan
- Full name: Saga Sunrise Park General Gymnasium
- Location: Saga, Saga, Japan
- Owner: Saga Prefecture
- Operator: Saga Prefecture Sports Association
- Capacity: 2,118
- Surface: 12,235 m²

Construction
- Opened: June, 1986
- Cost

Tenants
- Saga Ballooners; Hisamitsu Springs

Saga Prefectural Gymnasium is an arena in Saga, Saga, Japan. It is the home arena of the Saga Ballooners of the B.League, Japan's professional basketball league.

== Facilities ==
The gymnasium complex is divided into four sections: SAGA Stadium, SAGA Aqua, SAGA Arena, and SAGA Plaza. Facilities in the complex include:

- Main Arena
- Sub Arena
- Swimming pools
- Running track
- Athletics stadium
- Baseball field
- Air rifle shooting range
- Tennis court
- Equestrian field
- Judo, kendo, and kyudo halls
- Fencing hall
- Boxing hall

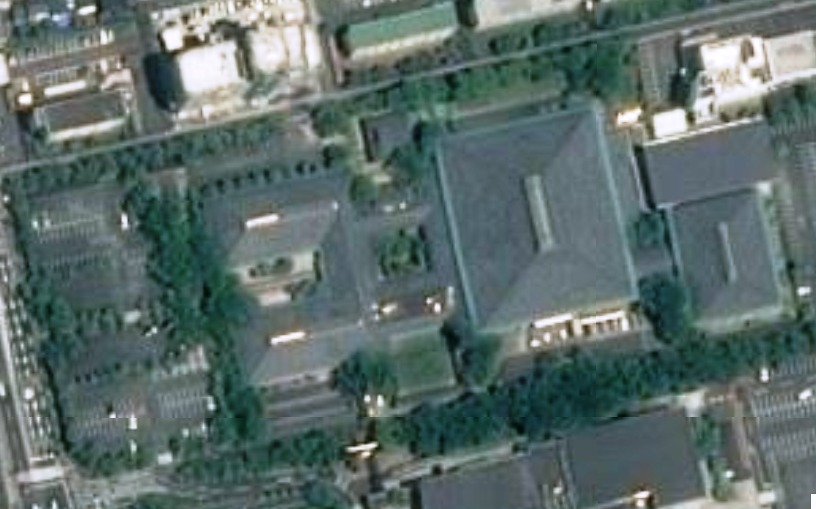
Satellite view
