= Tokorozawa Municipal Gymnasium =

Arena in Tokorozawa, Saitama, Japan

Coordinates: 35°48′36.4″N 139°27′46.4″E

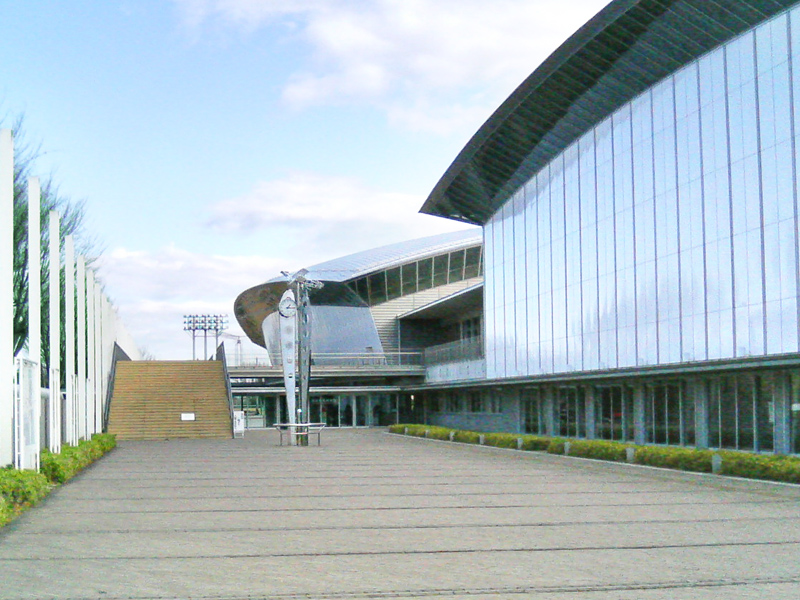
- Interactive map of Tokorozawa Municipal Gymnasium
- Full name: Tokorozawa Municipal Gymnasium
- Location: Tokorozawa, Saitama, Japan
- Owner: Tokorozawa city
- Operator: Tokorozawa city
- Capacity: 4,308

Construction
- Opened: May, 2004
- Cost
- Architect: Itakura Associates Architects and Engineers

Tenant
- Saitama Broncos

Tokorozawa Municipal Gymnasium is an arena in Tokorozawa, Saitama, Japan. It is the home arena of the Saitama Broncos of the B.League, Japan's professional basketball league.

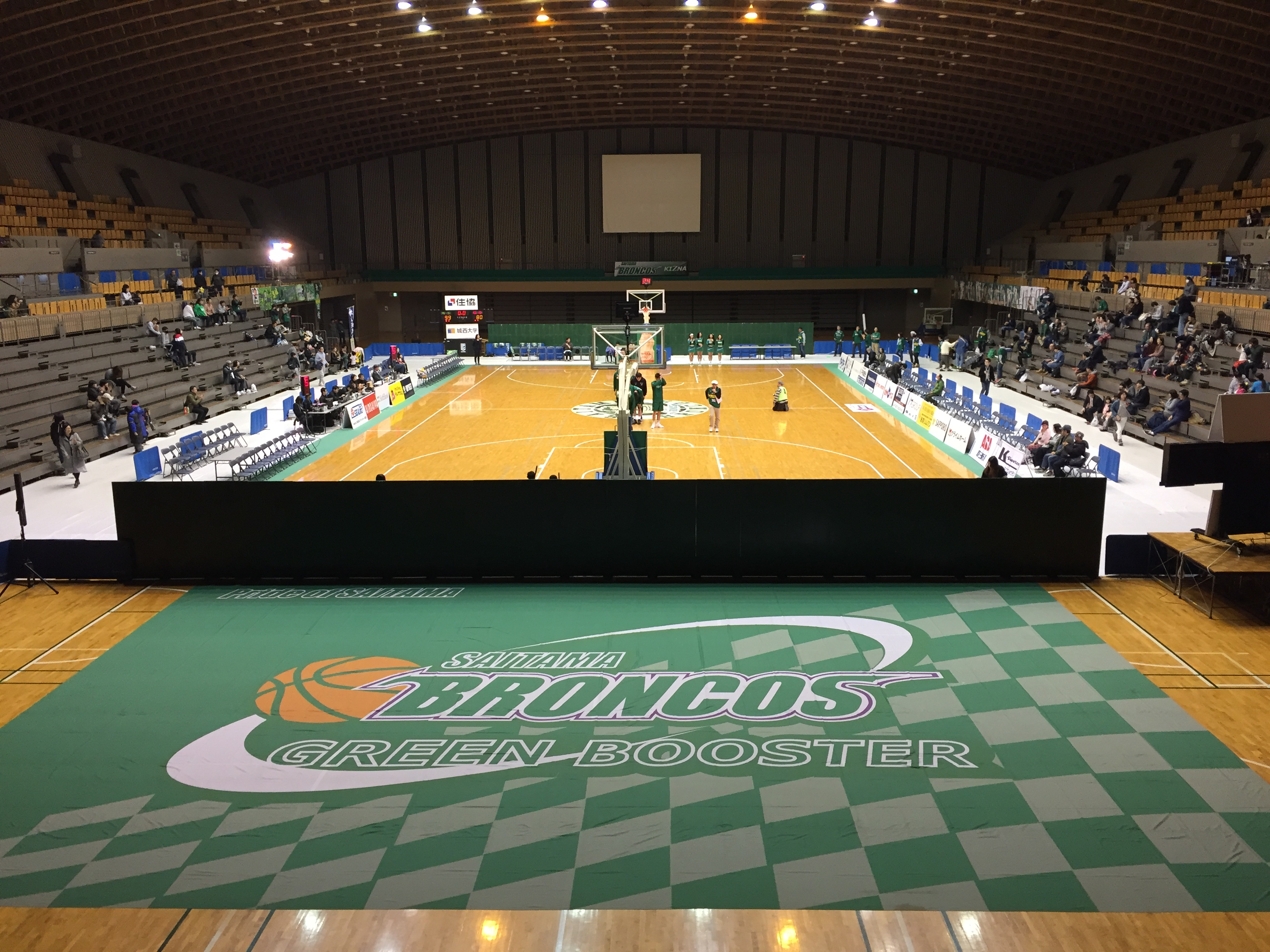
Arena

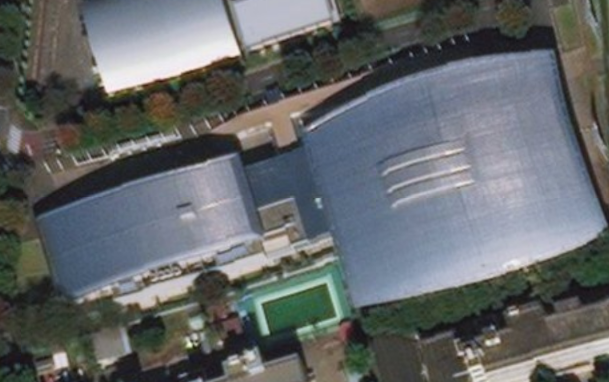
Satellite view
