= Okayama Seagulls =

Japanese volleyball club

- Founded: 1999
- Ground: Okayama City, Okayama, Japan
- Manager Head coach: (Japan) Seiko Nakata (Japan) Akiyoshi Kawamoto
- Captain: Sora Nagase
- League: SV.League
- 2025-26: 12th
- Website: Club home page

Okayama Seagulls (岡山シーガルズ, Okayama shīgaruzu) is a women's volleyball team based in Okayama city, Okayama, Japan. It plays in SV.League. The club was founded in 1999.

== Honours ==
V.League/V.Premiere League

- Champions (0):
- Runners-up (2): 2013-14, 2019–20

V.Challenge League

- Champions (1): 2017-2018
- Runners-up (0)

Kurowashiki All Japan Volleyball Championship

- Champions (1): 2024
- Runners-up (1): 2005

Empress's Cup

- Champions (0):
- Runners-up (1): 2013

Domestic Sports Festival (Volleyball)

- Champions (10): 2002-2006, 2008-2011 and 2014-2015

== League results ==
| League | | Position | Teams | Matches | Win | Lose |
|---|---|---|---|---|---|---|
| V.League | 6th (1999-2000) | 9th | 10 | 18 | 4 | 14 |
| V.League | 7th (2000–01) | 10th | 10 | 18 | 3 | 15 |
| V.League | 8th (2001–02) | 5th | 9 | 16 | 10 | 6 |
| V.League | 9th (2002–03) | 6th | 8 | 21 | 8 | 13 |
| V.League | 10th (2003–04) | 5th | 10 | 18 | 10 | 8 |
| V.League | 11th (2004–05) | 5th | 10 | 27 | 14 | 13 |
| V.League | 12th (2005–06) | 5th | 10 | 27 | 15 | 12 |
| V・Premier | 2006-07 | 8th | 10 | 27 | 10 | 17 |
| V・Premier | 2007-08 | 4th | 10 | 27 | 14 | 13 |
| V・Premier | 2008-09 | 7th | 10 | 27 | 13 | 14 |
| V・Premier | 2009-10 | 6th | 8 | 28 | 10 | 18 |
| V・Premier | 2010-11 | 8th | 8 | 26 | 1 | 25 |
| V・Premier | 2011-12 | 4th | 8 | 21 | 11 | 10 |
| V・Premier | 2012-13 | 3rd | 8 | 28 | 15 | 13 |
| V・Premier | 2013-14 | Runners-up | 8 | 28 | 17 | 11 |
| V・Premier | 2014-15 | 4th | 8 | 21 | 13 | 8 |
| V・Premier | 2015-16 | 4th | 8 | 21 | 9 | 12 |
| V・Premier | 2016-17 | 7th | 8 | 21 | 5 | 16 |
| V・Challenge | 2017-18 | Champions | 7 | 18 | 17 | 1 |
| V.League Division 1 (V1) | 2018–19 | 9th | 11 | 20 | 10 | 10 |
| V.League Division 1 (V1) | 2019-20 | Runners-up | 12 | 21 | 15 | 6 |
| V.League Division 1 (V1) | 2020-21 | 6th | 12 | 21 | 11 | 10 |
| SV.League | 2024-25 | 11th | 14 | 44 | 15 | 29 |
| SV.League | 2025-26 | 12th | 14 | 44 | 7 | 37 |

== Current squad ==
2026/27 Squad as of November 2026

- Head coach: (Japan) Akiyoshi Kawamoto

| No. | Name | Position | Date of birth | Height (m) |
|---|---|---|---|---|
| 1 | (Japan) Mayu Hamada | Setter | 8 May 2003 (age 23) | 1.63 m (5 ft 4 in) |
| 2 | (Japan) Amika Saiki | Outside Hitter | 12 September 2003 (age 23) | 1.77 m (5 ft 10 in) |
| 4 | (Japan) Rinka Komatsubara | Outside Hitter | 16 May 2001 (age 25) | 1.76 m (5 ft 9 in) |
| 5 | (Japan) Kaho Wakaizumi | Opposite Hitter | 20 August 1999 (age 27) | 1.75 m (5 ft 9 in) |
| 6 | (Japan) Kotoha Miyagawa | Opposite Hitter | 25 December 2006 (age 19) | 1.75 m (5 ft 9 in) |
| 7 | (United States) Jade Elisa Light | Outside Hitter | 26 November 2004 (age 21) | 1.88 m (6 ft 2 in) |
| 8 | (Japan) Ayaha Miyagawa | Middle Blocker | 25 December 2006 (age 19) | 1.85 m (6 ft 1 in) |
| 9 | (Japan) Yuri Takayanagi | Outside Hitter | 19 April 2000 (age 26) | 1.77 m (5 ft 10 in) |
| 10 | (Japan) Rikana Kai | Outside Hitter | 4 September 2003 (age 23) | 1.68 m (5 ft 6 in) |
| 11 | (Japan) Hina Kido | Libero | 11 September 2004 (age 22) | 1.58 m (5 ft 2 in) |
| 12 | (Japan) Sayaka Seo | Setter | 20 March 2004 (age 22) | 1.58 m (5 ft 2 in) |
| 14 | (Japan) Nanaka Sahara | Setter | 23 December 2009 (age 16) | 1.73 m (5 ft 8 in) |
| 15 | (Japan) Yuka Niina | Setter | 20 October 2004 (age 22) | 1.61 m (5 ft 3 in) |
| 16 | (Japan) Marina Saito | Libero | 12 July 2007 (age 19) | 1.59 m (5 ft 3 in) |
| 18 | (Japan) Wakana Fujimura | Outside Hitter | 27 May 2001 (age 25) | 1.78 m (5 ft 10 in) |
| 21 | (Japan) Kokone Nakai | Middle Blocker | 24 May 2003 (age 23) | 1.75 m (5 ft 9 in) |
| 25 | (Japan) Ai Okano | Outside Hitter | 17 April 2000 (age 26) | 1.68 m (5 ft 6 in) |
| 26 | (Japan) Sora Nagase (C) | Middle Blocker | 18 August 1999 (age 27) | 1.79 m (5 ft 10 in) |
| 27 | (Vietnam) Trần Thị Bích Thủy | Middle Blocker | 11 December 2000 (age 25) | 1.84 m (6 ft 0 in) |
| 28 | (Japan) Miku Wada | Outside Hitter | 27 April 2006 (age 20) | 1.70 m (5 ft 7 in) |
| 31 | (Japan) Tomoka Nagai | Middle Blocker | 24 November 2002 (age 23) | 1.78 m (5 ft 10 in) |
| 32 | (Japan) Maika Matsumoto | Outside Hitter | 15 January 2003 (age 23) | 1.76 m (5 ft 9 in) |
| 33 | (Japan) Yuzu Nakamoto | Outside Hitter | 13 November 2002 (age 24) | 1.78 m (5 ft 10 in) |

== Former players ==
Domestic players

Japan

- Mari Nomura (1992–2009)
- Yumiko Ono (2003–2009)
- Nobuko Yonemura (2002–2011)
- Chie Kanda (1990–2010)
- Mayumi Kosuge (2000–2011)
- Rie Hotta (2008–2011)
- Hiroko Okano (1995–2013)
- Kazuyo Mori (1995–2012)
- Megumi Kurihara (2012–2014)
- Yuki Sasaki (2012–2014)
- Natsumi Horiguchi (2010–2014)
- Mai Fukuda (2009–2014)
- Mai Yamaguchi (2002-2019)
- Koyuki Okusu (2016-2019)
- Moe Sasaki (2012–2020)
- Minami Yoshida (2006–2020)
- Aki Kawabata (2008–2018)
- Mayu Takada (2016–2019) Transferred to 9-person Ibiden Regulus
- Hinako Hayashi (2015–2019) Transferred to 9-person Panasonic Bluebells
- Sanae Watanabe (2017–2021) Transferred to PFU BlueCats
- Minami Nishimura (2017–2021)
- Anna Imura (2014–2021)
- Aki Maruyama (2009–2021)
- Yurika Kouno (2014–2021)
- Haruka Yamashita (2009-2023)

Foreign players

Thailand

- Thanacha Sooksod (2022–2023)

Vietnam

- Trần Thị Bích Thủy (2025-)
