= 2018–19 V-League (South Korea) =

- League: V-League
- Sport: Volleyball
- Duration: 13 October 2018 – 27 March 2019
- Games: 228
- Teams: M: 7 W: 6
- Total attendance: 580,448

Regular season (Men's)
- Top seed: Incheon Korean Air Jumbos
- Top scorer: (Netherlands) Thijs Ter Horst (Daejeon Samsung Bluefangs)

Regular season (Women's)
- Top seed: Incheon Heungkuk Life Pink Spiders
- Top scorer: (United States) Adora Anae (Hwaseong IBK Altos)

Finals
- Champions: M: Cheonan Hyundai Capital Skywalkers; W: Incheon Heungkuk Life Pink Spiders
- Runners-up: M: Incheon Korean Air Jumbos; W: Gyeongbuk Gimcheon Hi-pass
- Finals MVP: M: (South Korea) Jeon Kwang-in (Cheonan Hyundai Capital Skywalkers); W: (South Korea) Lee Jae-yeong (Incheon Heungkuk Life Pink Spiders)

V-League seasons
- ← 2017–18 2019–20 →

The 2018–19 V-League season eas the 15th season of the V-League, the highest professional volleyball league in South Korea. The season started on 13 October 2018 and finished on 27 March 2019.

Cheonan Hyundai Capital Skywalkers claimed their fourth championship in the men's league

== Teams ==
=== Men's clubs ===
Location of teams in V-League Men's Clubs

Team	Location	Stadium	Capacity
Ansan OK Savings Bank Rush & Cash	Ansan	Sangnoksu Gymnasium	2,700
Cheonan Hyundai Capital Skywalkers	Cheonan	Yu Gwan-sun Gymnasium	5,482
Daejeon Samsung Bluefangs	Daejeon	Chungmu Gymnasium	5,000
Uijeongbu KB Insurance Stars	Uijeongbu	Uijeongbu Gymnasium	6,240
Incheon Korean Air Jumbos	Incheon	Gyeyang Gymnasium	5,000 Incheon Korean Air Jumbos
Seoul Woori Card Wibee	Seoul	Jangchung Gymnasium	4,618 Jangchung Arena
Suwon KEPCO Vixtorm	Suwon	Suwon Gymnasium	4,317

=== Women's clubs ===
Location of teams in V-League Women's Clubs

Team	Location	Stadium	Capacity
Daejeon KGC	Daejeon	Chungmu Gymnasium	5,000
Gimcheon Korea Expressway Hi-pass	Gimcheon	Gimcheon Gymnasium	6,000
GS Caltex Seoul KIXX	Seoul	Jangchung Gymnasium	4,618 Jangchung Arena
Hwaseong IBK Altos	Hwaseong	Hwaseong Gymnasium	5,152 Hwaseong IBK Altos
Incheon Heungkuk Life Pink Spiders	Incheon	Gyeyang Gymnasium	5,000 Incheon Korean Air Jumbos
Suwon Hyundai Hillstate	Suwon	Suwon Gymnasium	4,317

== Season standing procedure ==
1. Match points
2. Number of matches won
3. Sets ratio
4. Points ratio
5. Result of the last match between the tied teams

Match won 3–0 or 3–1: 3 match points for the winner, 0 match points for the loser
Match won 3–2: 2 match points for the winner, 1 match point for the loser

== Regular season ==
=== League table (Men's) ===
Pos	Team	Pld	W	L	Pts	SR	SPR	Qualification
1	Incheon Korean Air Jumbos	36	25	11	75	1.586	1.074	Finals
2	Cheonan Hyundai Skywalkers	36	25	11	70	1.545	1.065	Semifinals
3	Seoul Woori Card Wibee	36	20	16	62	1.242	1.022	Semifinals
4	Daejeon Samsung Bluefangs	36	19	17	55	1.074	1.005	
5	Ansan Rush & Cash	36	17	19	51	0.903	0.995	
6	Uijeongbu KB Insurance Stars	36	16	20	46	0.800	0.965	
7	Suwon KEPCO Vixtorm	36	4	32	19	0.396	0.884	

Source: League table (Men's)

=== League table (Women's) ===
Pos	Team	Pld	W	L	Pts	SR	SPR	Qualification
1	Incheon Heungkuk Life Pink Spiders	30	21	9	62	1.775	1.077	Finals
2	Gyeongbuk Gimcheon Hi-pass	30	20	10	56	1.429	1.057	Semifinals
3	GS Caltex Seoul KIXX	30	18	12	52	1.280	1.027	Semifinals
4	Hwaseong IBK Altos	30	16	14	50	1.167	1.029	
5	Suwon Hyundai Hillstate	30	9	21	29	0.565	0.927	
6	Daejeon KGC	30	6	24	21	0.400	0.885	

Source: League table (Women's)

=== Results - Male ===
==== Round 1 ====
Home \ Away	INC	CHN	ANS	DEJ	SEL	UJB	SUW
Incheon Korean Air Jumbos	—	0–3	—	3–1	—	—	3–1
Cheonan Hyundai Skywalkers	—	—	—	3–1	0–3	3–0	—
Ansan Rush & Cash	3–2	0–3	—	—	—	3–1	3–1
Daejeon Samsung Bluefangs	—	—	0–3	—	3–1	—	3–1
Seoul Woori Card Wibee	0–3	—	1–3	—	—	—	3–0
Uijeongbu KB Insurance Stars	0–3	—	—	2–3	3–1	—	—
Suwon KEPCO Vixtorm	—	2–3	—	—	—	1–3	—

Updated to match(es) played on - all 1st round matches completed. Source:
Legend: Blue = home team win; Yellow = draw; Red = away team win.

==== Round 2 ====
Home \ Away	INC	CHN	ANS	DEJ	SEL	UJB	SUW
Incheon Korean Air Jumbos	—	—	—	—	2–3	3–1	—
Cheonan Hyundai Skywalkers	1–3	—	3–2	—	—	—	3–2
Ansan Rush & Cash	0–3	—	—	3–1	—	—	3–0
Daejeon Samsung Bluefangs	0–3	3–2	—	—	—	3–0	—
Seoul Woori Card Wibee	—	2–3	3–1	2–3	—	3–0	3–0
Uijeongbu KB Insurance Stars	—	2–3	1–3	—	—	—	3–1
Suwon KEPCO Vixtorm	2–3	—	—	2–3	—	—	—

Updated to match(es) played on all 2nd round matches completed. Source:
Legend: Blue = home team win; Yellow = draw; Red = away team win.

==== Round 3 ====
Home \ Away	INC	CHN	ANS	DEJ	SEL	UJB	SUW
Incheon Korean Air Jumbos	—	3–1	1–3	1–3	—	—	3–1
Cheonan Hyundai Skywalkers	—	—	—	3–1	3–0	3–0	—
Ansan Rush & Cash	-	0–3	—	—	2–3	1–3	-
Daejeon Samsung Bluefangs	—	—	3–0	—	1–3	-	3–1
Seoul Woori Card Wibee	2–3	—	-	—	—	—	-
Uijeongbu KB Insurance Stars	1–3	—	—	2–3	1–3	—	—
Suwon KEPCO Vixtorm		1–3	0–3	—	2–3	3–2	—

Updated to match(es) played on all 3rd round matches completed. Source:
Legend: Blue = home team win; Yellow = draw; Red = away team win.

==== Round 4 ====
Home \ Away	INC	CHN	ANS	DEJ	SEL	UJB	SUW
Incheon Korean Air Jumbos	—	—	2–3	—	3–2	2–3	—
Cheonan Hyundai Skywalkers	3–1	—	3–2	—	—	—	3–0
Ansan Rush & Cash	-		—	3–0	0–3	—	-
Daejeon Samsung Bluefangs	2–3	3–1	—	—	—	3–1	—
Seoul Woori Card Wibee	—	2–3	-	3–1	—	3–0	-
Uijeongbu KB Insurance Stars	—	1–3	3–0	—	—	—	3–2
Suwon KEPCO Vixtorm	2–3	—	3–1	0–3	0–3	—	—

Updated to match(es) played on all 4th round matches completed. Source:
Legend: Blue = home team win; Yellow = draw; Red = away team win.

==== Round 5 ====
Home \ Away	INC	CHN	ANS	DEJ	SEL	UJB	SUW
Incheon Korean Air Jumbos	—	2–3	—	3–2	—	—	3–2
Cheonan Hyundai Skywalkers	—	—	—	3–0	0–3	1–3	—
Ansan Rush & Cash	1–3	0–3	—	—	—	0–3	—
Daejeon Samsung Bluefangs	—	—	2–3	—	1–3	—	3–0
Seoul Woori Card Wibee	0–3	—	3–1	—	—	—	3–0
Uijeongbu KB Insurance Stars	3–2	—	—	3–1	0–3	—	—
Suwon KEPCO Vixtorm	—	3–0	0–3	—	—	2–3	—

Updated to match(es) played on all 5th round matches completed. Source:
Legend: Blue = home team win; Yellow = draw; Red = away team win.

==== Round 6 ====
Home \ Away	INC	CHN	ANS	DEJ	SEL	UJB	SUW
Incheon Korean Air Jumbos	—	—	2–3	—	3–0	3–1	—
Cheonan Hyundai Skywalkers	0–3	—	3–0	—	—	—	3–0
Ansan Rush & Cash		—	—	1–3	3–1	—	3–0
Daejeon Samsung Bluefangs	1–3	1–3	—	—	—	3–0	—
Seoul Woori Card Wibee	—	3–2	—	0–3	—	1–3	—
Uijeongbu KB Insurance Stars	—	3–2	3–2	—	—	—	3–1
Suwon KEPCO Vixtorm	1–3	—	—	0–3	3–2	—	—

Updated to match(es) played on all 6th round matches completed. Source:
Legend: Blue = home team win; Yellow = draw; Red = away team win.

Source: Game Schedule (Men's)

=== Results - Female ===
==== Round 1 ====
Home \ Away	SEL	DEJ	HWA	INC	GIM	SUW
GS Caltex Seoul KIXX	—	-	3–2	3–0	3–0	3–1
Daejeon KGC	3–1	—	—	—	3–1	—
Hwaseong IBK Altos	—	0–3	—	—	—	3–0
Incheon Heungkuk Life Pink Spiders	—	3–1	0–3	—	—	3–0
Gyeongbuk Gimcheon Hi-pass	—	—	3–2	2–3	—	3–2
Suwon Hyundai Hillstate	—	1–3	-	—		—

Updated to match(es) played on - all 1st round matches completed. Source:
Legend: Blue = home team win; Yellow = draw; Red = away team win.

==== Round 2 ====
Home \ Away	SEL	DEJ	HWA	INC	GIM	SUW
GS Caltex Seoul KIXX	—	3–1	—	—	—	3–0
Daejeon KGC	—	—	1–3	0–3	—	3–0
Hwaseong IBK Altos	3–2	—	—	1–3	3–2	—
Incheon Heungkuk Life Pink Spiders	2–3	—	—	—	1–3	—
Gyeongbuk Gimcheon Hi-pass	0–3	3–2	—	—	—	—
Suwon Hyundai Hillstate	—	—	0–3	0–3	0–3	—

Updated to match(es) played on all 2nd round matches completed. Source:
Legend: Blue = home team win; Yellow = draw; Red = away team win.

==== Round 3 ====
Home \ Away	SEL	DEJ	HWA	INC	GIM	SUW
GS Caltex Seoul KIXX	—	—	0–3	0–3	—	—
Daejeon KGC	0–3	—	—	—	0–3	—
Hwaseong IBK Altos	—	3–0	—	—	—	3–1
Incheon Heungkuk Life Pink Spiders	—	3–0	2–3	—	—	3–1
Gyeongbuk Gimcheon Hi-pass	3–1	—	3–1	1–3	—	3–0
Suwon Hyundai Hillstate	2–3	3–0	—	—		—

Updated to match(es) played on all 3rd round matches completed. Source:
Legend: Blue = home team win; Yellow = draw; Red = away team win.

==== Round 4 ====
Home \ Away	SEL	DEJ	HWA	INC	GIM	SUW
GS Caltex Seoul KIXX	—	3–0	—	—	2–3	-
Daejeon KGC	—	—	0–3	0–3	-	0–3
Hwaseong IBK Altos	2–3	—	—	0–3	3–0	—
Incheon Heungkuk Life Pink Spiders	0–3	—	—	—	2–3	—
Gyeongbuk Gimcheon Hi-pass	—	3–0	—	—	—	—
Suwon Hyundai Hillstate	0–3	—	3–1	0–3	3–1	—

Updated to match(es) played on all 4th round matches completed. Source:
Legend: Blue = home team win; Yellow = draw; Red = away team win.

==== Round 5 ====
Home \ Away	SEL	DEJ	HWA	INC	GIM	SUW
GS Caltex Seoul KIXX	—	-	1–3	0–3	0–3	
Daejeon KGC	1–3	—	—	—	2–3	—
Hwaseong IBK Altos	—	3–0	—	—	—	3–2
Incheon Heungkuk Life Pink Spiders	—	3–2	3–2	—	—	3–0
Gyeongbuk Gimcheon Hi-pass	—	—	3–0	3–0	—	2–3
Suwon Hyundai Hillstate	3–1	3–0	-	—		—

Updated to match(es) played on - all 5th round matches completed. Source:
Legend: Blue = home team win; Yellow = draw; Red = away team win.

==== Round 6 ====
Home \ Away	SEL	DEJ	HWA	INC	GIM	SUW
GS Caltex Seoul KIXX	—	3–1	—	—	—	3–0
Daejeon KGC	—	—	3–0	0–3	—	1–3
Hwaseong IBK Altos	2–3	—	—	2–3	3–1	—
Incheon Heungkuk Life Pink Spiders	3–0	—	—	—	1–3	—
Gyeongbuk Gimcheon Hi-pass	3–2	3–0	—	—	—	—
Suwon Hyundai Hillstate	—	—	3–0	1–3	1–3	—

Updated to match(es) played on all 6th round matches completed. Source:
Legend: Blue = home team win; Yellow = draw; Red = away team win.

Source: Game Schedule (Women's)

== Play-offs ==
=== Bracket (Men's ) ===
Semifinals
1	Incheon Korean Air Jumbos
2	Cheonan Hyundai Capital Skywalkers	3	3
3	Seoul Woori Card Wibee	2	0

Finals
1	Incheon Korean Air Jumbos	2	2	1
2	Cheonan Hyundai Capital Skywalkers	3	3	3

=== Bracket (Women's) ===
Semifinals
1	Incheon Heungkuk Life Pink Spiders
2	Gyeongbuk Gimcheon Hi-pass	3	2	3
3	GS Caltex Seoul KIXX	0	3	2

Finals
1	Incheon Heungkuk Life Pink Spiders	3	0	3	3
2	Gyeongbuk Gimcheon Hi-pass	1	3	2	1

== Attendance ==
=== Men's teams ===
Pos	Team	Total	High	Low	Average	Change
1	Cheonan Hyundai Skywalkers	59,896	5,043	2,019	3,328	n/a
2	Seoul Woori Card Wibee	31,997	4,010	1,493	3,124	n/a
3	Uijeongbu KB Insurance Stars	44,653	4,076	1,149	2,481	n/a
4	Daejeon Samsung Bluefangs	43,965	3,458	1,304	2,272	n/a
5	Incheon Korean Air Jumbos	36,198	3,211	1,327	2,011	n/a
6	Ansan Rush & Cash	34,465	2,722	1,204	1,915	n/a
7	Suwon KEPCO Vixtorm	31,997	4,106	804	1,778	n/a
	League total	307,401	5,043	804	2,440	0.0%

Updated to games played on all games played

=== Women's teams ===
Pos	Team	Total	High	Low	Average	Change
1	Gyeongbuk Gimcheon Hi-pass	47,143	5,617	1,832	3,143	n/a
2	GS Caltex Seoul KIXX	43,706	4,200	1,702	2,914	n/a
3	Daejeon KGC	38,657	2,925	2,254	2,577	n/a
2	Hwaseong IBK Altos	36,423	5,108	1,377	2,428	n/a
5	Incheon Heungkuk Life Pink Spiders	31,888	3,030	1,231	2,126	n/a
6	Suwon Hyundai Hillstate	28,681	3,383	868	1,912	n/a
	League total	226,498	5,617	868	2,517	0.0%

Updated to games played on all games played

== Top Scorers ==
=== Men's ===
Rank	Player	Club	Points
1	(Netherlands) Thijs Ter Horst	Daejeon Samsung Bluefangs	879
2	(Colombia) Liberman Agamez	Seoul Woori Card Wibee	873
3	(Cuba) Yosvany Hernandez	Ansan Rush & Cash	835
4	(Hungary) Krisztian Padar	Cheonan Hyundai Skywalkers	801
5	(Brazil) Felipe Airton Banderò	Uijeongbu KB Insurance Stars	775
6	(Slovenia) Mitja Gasparini	Incheon Korean Air Jumbos	740
7	(South Korea) Seo Jae-duck	Suwon KEPCO Vixtorm	637
8	(South Korea) Park Chul-woo	Daejeon Samsung Bluefangs	558
9	(South Korea) Jung Ji-seok	Incheon Korean Air Jumbos	548
10	(South Korea) Jeon Kwang-in	Cheonan Hyundai Skywalkers	466

=== Women's ===
Rank	Player	Club	Points
1	(United States) Adora Anae	Hwaseong IBK Altos	772
2	(South Korea) Lee Jae-yeong	Incheon Heungkuk Life Pink Spiders	624
3	(Poland) Berenika Tomsia	Incheon Heungkuk Life Pink Spiders	610
4	(South Korea) Park Jeong-ah	Gyeongbuk Gimcheon Hi-pass	588
5	(Moldova) Aliona Martiniuc	GS Caltex Seoul KIXX	527
6	(Spain) Milagros Collar	Suwon Hyundai Hillstate	504
7	(South Korea) Yang Hyo-jin	Suwon Hyundai Hillstate	499
8	(South Korea) Lee So-young	GS Caltex Seoul KIXX	454
9	(Senegal) Fatou Niane Diouck	Gyeongbuk Gimcheon Hi-pass	454
10	(United States) Alaina Coble	Daejeon KGC	444

== Player of the Round ==
=== Men's ===
Round	Player	Club
1	(Cuba) Yosvany Hernandez	Ansan Rush & Cash
2	(South Korea) Jung Ji-seok	Incheon Korean Air Jumbos
3	(Colombia) Liberman Agamez	Seoul Woori Card Wibee
4	(Colombia) Liberman Agamez	Seoul Woori Card Wibee
5	(Brazil) Felipe Airton Banderò	Uijeongbu KB Insurance Stars
6	(South Korea) Kwak Seung-suk	Incheon Korean Air Jumbos

=== Women's ===
Round	Player	Club
1	(South Korea) Lee So-young	GS Caltex Seoul KIXX
2	(United States) Adora Anae	Hwaseong IBK Altos
3	(South Korea) Lee Jae-yeong	Incheon Heungkuk Life Pink Spiders
4	(Moldova) Aliona Martiniuc	GS Caltex Seoul KIXX
5	(South Korea) Mun Jeong-won	Gyeongbuk Gimcheon Hi-pass
6	(South Korea) Lee Jae-yeong	Incheon Heungkuk Life Pink Spiders

== Final standing ==
=== Men's League ===
Rank	Team
1st place, gold medalist(s)	Cheonan Hyundai Capital Skywalkers
2nd place, silver medalist(s)	Incheon Korean Air Jumbos
3rd place, bronze medalist(s)	Seoul Woori Card Wibee
4	Daejeon Samsung Bluefangs
5	Ansan Rush & Cash
6	Uijeongbu KB Insurance Stars
7	Suwon KEPCO Vixtorm

=== Women's League ===
Rank	Team
1st place, gold medalist(s)	Incheon Heungkuk Life Pink Spiders
2nd place, silver medalist(s)	Gyeongbuk Gimcheon Hi-pass
3rd place, bronze medalist(s)	GS Caltex Seoul KIXX
4	Hwaseong IBK Altos
5	Suwon Hyundai Hillstate
6	Daejeon KGC
