= 2018–19 Men's V-League (South Korea) =

- League: Men's V-League
- Sport: Volleyball
- Duration: 13 October 2018 – 26 March 2019
- Number of games: 36 per team
- Number of teams: 7
- TV partner(s): KBS, KBS N Sports, SBS Sports

Regular season
- Top seed: Incheon Korean Air Jumbos
- Season MVP: Jung Ji-seok (Korean Air)
- Top scorer: Thijs ter Horst (Samsung Fire)

Postseason
- Playoffs runners-up: Seoul Woori Card Wibee

Finals
- Champions: Cheonan Hyundai Capital Skywalkers
- Runners-up: Incheon Korean Air Jumbos
- Finals MVP: Jeon Kwang-in (Hyundai Capital)

Men's V-League seasons
- ← 2017–18 2019–20 →

The 2018–19 Men's V-League was the 15th season of the Men's V-League, the highest professional men's volleyball league in South Korea. It is sponsored by Dodram and known as The Dodram 2018–19 Men's V-League for sponsorship purposes. The season started on 13 October 2018 and concluded on 26 March 2019.

== Teams ==
Location of teams in Men's V-League

Club	City	Stadium	Capacity
Ansan OK Savings Bank Rush & Cash	Ansan	Sangnoksu Gymnasium	2,285
Cheonan Hyundai Capital Skywalkers	Cheonan	Yu Gwan-sun Gymnasium	5,482
Daejeon Samsung Fire Bluefangs	Daejeon	Chungmu Gymnasium	6,000
Incheon Korean Air Jumbos	Incheon	Gyeyang Gymnasium	4,270
Seoul Woori Card Wibee	Seoul	Jangchung Gymnasium	4,618
Suwon KEPCO Vixtorm	Suwon	Suwon Gymnasium	5,145
Uijeongbu KB Insurance Stars	Uijeongbu	Uijeongbu Gymnasium	6,240

== Format ==
=== Regular season ===
Regular season plays a sextuple round-robin (triple home and away matches) and each single round-robin is called a round. Each team plays 36 games in the regular season.

==== Regular season standing procedure ====
1. Match points
2. Number of matches won
3. Sets ratio
4. Points ratio
5. Result of the last match between the tied teams

Match won 3–0 or 3–1: 3 match points for the winner, 0 match points for the loser
Match won 3–2: 2 match points for the winner, 1 match point for the loser

=== Postseason ===
The top three teams in the regular season standing will qualify for the postseason. However, if the difference between the 3rd and 4th place team is within three match points, the 4th place team will also qualify. The lowest-qualifying team face off in a stepladder system, where each winners then faces the next-highest team, culminating in the finals against the top-ranked team.

- Semi-playoff (if necessary): 3rd place team vs. 4th place team – Single match
- Playoffs: 2nd place team vs. 3rd place team or Semi-playoff winners – Best-of-three series
- Finals: 1st place team vs. Playoffs winners – Best-of-five series

=== Final standing procedure ===
1. Finals winners
2. Finals losers
3. Playoffs losers
4. Regular season 4th place team or Semi-playoff losers
5. Regular season 5th place team
6. Regular season 6th place team
7. Regular season 7th place team

== Regular season ==
- All times are Korea Standard Time (UTC+09:00).

Pos	Team	Pld	W	L	Pts	SW	SL	SR	SPW	SPL	SPR	Qualification
1	Incheon Korean Air Jumbos	36	25	11	75	92	58	1.586	3417	3183	1.074	Finals
2	Cheonan Hyundai Capital Skywalkers	36	25	11	70	85	55	1.545	3245	3048	1.065	Playoffs
3	Seoul Woori Card Wibee	36	20	16	62	77	62	1.242	3127	3061	1.022	Playoffs
4	Daejeon Samsung Fire Bluefangs	36	19	17	55	73	68	1.074	3216	3199	1.005	
5	Ansan OK Savings Bank Rush & Cash	36	17	19	51	65	72	0.903	3063	3079	0.995	
6	Uijeongbu KB Insurance Stars	36	16	20	46	64	80	0.800	3216	3333	0.965	
7	Suwon KEPCO Vixtorm	36	4	32	19	40	101	0.396	2917	3298	0.884	

=== First round ===
Date	Time		Score		Set 1	Set 2	Set 3	Set 4	Set 5	Total	Report
13 Oct	14:00	Incheon Korean Air Jumbos	0–3	Cheonan Hyundai Capital Skywalkers	21–25	23–25	20–25			64–75	Report
14 Oct	14:00	Daejeon Samsung Fire Bluefangs	3–1	Seoul Woori Card Wibee	20–25	25–19	25–23	41–39		111–106	Report
15 Oct	19:00	Ansan OK Savings Bank Rush & Cash	3–1	Suwon KEPCO Vixtorm	21–25	32–30	25–19	25–21		103–95	Report
16 Oct	19:01	Uijeongbu KB Insurance Stars	0–3	Incheon Korean Air Jumbos	18–25	22–25	26–28			66–78	Report
18 Oct	19:00	Seoul Woori Card Wibee	1–3	Ansan OK Savings Bank Rush & Cash	20–25	25–23	19–25	20–25		84–98	Report
19 Oct	19:00	Incheon Korean Air Jumbos	3–1	Suwon KEPCO Vixtorm	25–18	25–23	27–29	25–14		102–84	Report
20 Oct	14:00	Cheonan Hyundai Capital Skywalkers	3–1	Daejeon Samsung Fire Bluefangs	22–25	25–18	25–22	26–24		98–89	Report
21 Oct	14:00	Ansan OK Savings Bank Rush & Cash	3–1	Uijeongbu KB Insurance Stars	17–25	25–22	25–16	25–18		92–81	Report
22 Oct	19:00	Seoul Woori Card Wibee	0–3	Incheon Korean Air Jumbos	23–25	17–25	19–25			59–75	Report
23 Oct	19:00	Daejeon Samsung Fire Bluefangs	3–1	Suwon KEPCO Vixtorm	23–25	25–19	25–22	25–23		98–89	Report
25 Oct	19:00	Uijeongbu KB Insurance Stars	3–1	Seoul Woori Card Wibee	25–20	25–15	31–33	25–18		106–86	Report
26 Oct	19:00	Ansan OK Savings Bank Rush & Cash	0–3	Cheonan Hyundai Capital Skywalkers	17–25	27–29	19–25			63–79	Report
27 Oct	14:00	Incheon Korean Air Jumbos	3–1	Daejeon Samsung Fire Bluefangs	22–25	28–26	25–20	25–20		100–91	Report
28 Oct	14:00	Suwon KEPCO Vixtorm	1–3	Uijeongbu KB Insurance Stars	19–25	25–22	18–25	19–25		81–97	Report
29 Oct	19:00	Cheonan Hyundai Capital Skywalkers	0–3	Seoul Woori Card Wibee	23–25	22–25	23–25			68–75	Report
30 Oct	19:00	Daejeon Samsung Fire Bluefangs	0–3	Ansan OK Savings Bank Rush & Cash	27–29	27–29	20–25			74–83	Report
1 Nov	19:00	Suwon KEPCO Vixtorm	2–3	Cheonan Hyundai Capital Skywalkers	18–25	14–25	25–18	25–19	10–15	92–102	Report
2 Nov	19:00	Uijeongbu KB Insurance Stars	2–3	Daejeon Samsung Fire Bluefangs	23–25	25–20	29–27	20–25	8–15	105–112	Report
3 Nov	14:00	Ansan OK Savings Bank Rush & Cash	3–2	Incheon Korean Air Jumbos	25–27	23–25	25–13	25–19	15–12	113–96	Report
4 Nov	14:00	Seoul Woori Card Wibee	3–0	Suwon KEPCO Vixtorm	25–23	25–18	25–17			75–58	Report
5 Nov	19:00	Cheonan Hyundai Capital Skywalkers	3–0	Uijeongbu KB Insurance Stars	28–26	25–20	25–15			78–61	Report

=== Second round ===
Date	Time		Score		Set 1	Set 2	Set 3	Set 4	Set 5	Total	Report
6 Nov	19:05	Ansan OK Savings Bank Rush & Cash	3–1	Daejeon Samsung Fire Bluefangs	26–28	25–22	25–21	25–20		101–91	Report
8 Nov	19:00	Suwon KEPCO Vixtorm	2–3	Incheon Korean Air Jumbos	19–25	25–18	25–23	20–25	14–16	103–107	Report
9 Nov	19:00	Seoul Woori Card Wibee	2–3	Cheonan Hyundai Capital Skywalkers	25–21	21–25	30–28	9–25	16–18	101–117	Report
10 Nov	14:00	Daejeon Samsung Fire Bluefangs	3–0	Uijeongbu KB Insurance Stars	30–28	25–12	25–23			80–63	Report
11 Nov	14:00	Ansan OK Savings Bank Rush & Cash	0–3	Incheon Korean Air Jumbos	21–25	21–25	18–25			60–75	Report
12 Nov	19:00	Seoul Woori Card Wibee	3–0	Suwon KEPCO Vixtorm	29–27	25–14	25–20			79–61	Report
13 Nov	19:00	Daejeon Samsung Fire Bluefangs	3–2	Cheonan Hyundai Capital Skywalkers	23–25	15–25	25–18	25–23	15–13	103–104	Report
15 Nov	19:00	Uijeongbu KB Insurance Stars	3–1	Suwon KEPCO Vixtorm	25–23	18–25	25–16	25–15		93–79	Report
16 Nov	19:01	Cheonan Hyundai Capital Skywalkers	1–3	Incheon Korean Air Jumbos	25–19	17–25	20–25	23–25		85–94	Report
17 Nov	14:00	Seoul Woori Card Wibee	3–1	Ansan OK Savings Bank Rush & Cash	20–25	29–27	25–20	25–15		99–87	Report
18 Nov	14:00	Suwon KEPCO Vixtorm	2–3	Daejeon Samsung Fire Bluefangs	16–25	25–22	22–25	26–24	13–15	102–111	Report
19 Nov	19:00	Incheon Korean Air Jumbos	3–1	Uijeongbu KB Insurance Stars	22–25	25–19	25–21	25–21		97–86	Report
20 Nov	19:00	Cheonan Hyundai Capital Skywalkers	3–2	Ansan OK Savings Bank Rush & Cash	25–19	25–22	22–25	23–25	15–7	110–98	Report
22 Nov	19:00	Seoul Woori Card Wibee	2–3	Daejeon Samsung Fire Bluefangs	25–18	25–21	19–25	17–25	13–15	99–104	Report
23 Nov	19:00	Uijeongbu KB Insurance Stars	2–3	Cheonan Hyundai Capital Skywalkers	25–20	15–25	33–35	25–19	13–15	111–114	Report
24 Nov	14:00	Ansan OK Savings Bank Rush & Cash	3–0	Suwon KEPCO Vixtorm	25–17	25–21	25–18			75–56	Report
25 Nov	14:00	Daejeon Samsung Fire Bluefangs	0–3	Incheon Korean Air Jumbos	18–25	21–25	17–25			56–75	Report
26 Nov	19:00	Seoul Woori Card Wibee	3–0	Uijeongbu KB Insurance Stars	27–25	25–20	25–22			77–67	Report
27 Nov	19:00	Cheonan Hyundai Capital Skywalkers	3–2	Suwon KEPCO Vixtorm	23–25	27–25	25–20	23–25	15–12	113–107	Report
29 Nov	19:00	Incheon Korean Air Jumbos	2–3	Seoul Woori Card Wibee	30–28	25–16	21–25	23–25	13–15	112–109	Report
30 Nov	19:00	Uijeongbu KB Insurance Stars	1–3	Ansan OK Savings Bank Rush & Cash	25–16	22–25	21–25	14–25		82–91	Report

=== Third round ===
Date	Time		Score		Set 1	Set 2	Set 3	Set 4	Set 5	Total	Report
1 Dec	14:00	Suwon KEPCO Vixtorm	1–3	Cheonan Hyundai Capital Skywalkers	18–25	25–18	23–25	17–25		83–93	Report
2 Dec	14:00	Daejeon Samsung Fire Bluefangs	1–3	Seoul Woori Card Wibee	22–25	23–25	25–16	21–25		91–91	Report
3 Dec	19:00	Uijeongbu KB Insurance Stars	1–3	Incheon Korean Air Jumbos	30–28	19–25	23–25	22–25		94–103	Report
4 Dec	19:00	Ansan OK Savings Bank Rush & Cash	0–3	Cheonan Hyundai Capital Skywalkers	23–25	21–25	19–25			63–75	Report
6 Dec	19:00	Incheon Korean Air Jumbos	1–3	Daejeon Samsung Fire Bluefangs	23–25	25–17	22–25	22–25		92–92	Report
7 Dec	19:00	Suwon KEPCO Vixtorm	0–3	Ansan OK Savings Bank Rush & Cash	13–25	20–25	17–25			50–75	Report
8 Dec	14:00	Cheonan Hyundai Capital Skywalkers	3–0	Uijeongbu KB Insurance Stars	25–16	25–19	25–22			75–57	Report
9 Dec	14:00	Seoul Woori Card Wibee	2–3	Incheon Korean Air Jumbos	25–14	25–23	18–25	20–25	10–15	98–102	Report
10 Dec	19:00	Daejeon Samsung Fire Bluefangs	3–1	Suwon KEPCO Vixtorm	31–29	25–23	20–25	25–23		101–100	Report
11 Dec	19:00	Ansan OK Savings Bank Rush & Cash	1–3	Uijeongbu KB Insurance Stars	24–26	26–28	30–28	23–25		103–107	Report
13 Dec	19:00	Incheon Korean Air Jumbos	3–1	Cheonan Hyundai Capital Skywalkers	16–25	25–18	25–21	28–26		94–90	Report
14 Dec	19:00	Suwon KEPCO Vixtorm	2–3	Seoul Woori Card Wibee	22–25	25–23	21–25	31–29	11–15	110–117	Report
15 Dec	14:00	Uijeongbu KB Insurance Stars	2–3	Daejeon Samsung Fire Bluefangs	26–24	21–25	18–25	26–24	8–15	99–113	Report
16 Dec	14:00	Incheon Korean Air Jumbos	1–3	Ansan OK Savings Bank Rush & Cash	27–29	25–17	21–25	20–25		93–96	Report
17 Dec	19:00	Cheonan Hyundai Capital Skywalkers	3–0	Seoul Woori Card Wibee	25–18	25–16	25–12			75–46	Report
18 Dec	19:00	Suwon KEPCO Vixtorm	3–2	Uijeongbu KB Insurance Stars	25–23	20–25	25–14	27–29	15–9	112–100	Report
20 Dec	19:00	Ansan OK Savings Bank Rush & Cash	2–3	Seoul Woori Card Wibee	23–25	19–25	25–15	25–21	13–15	105–101	Report
21 Dec	19:00	Cheonan Hyundai Capital Skywalkers	3–1	Daejeon Samsung Fire Bluefangs	21–25	25–23	25–23	30–28		101–99	Report
22 Dec	14:00	Incheon Korean Air Jumbos	3–1	Suwon KEPCO Vixtorm	25–21	25–10	22–25	25–18		97–74	Report
23 Dec	14:00	Uijeongbu KB Insurance Stars	1–3	Seoul Woori Card Wibee	25–21	22–25	14–25	20–25		81–96	Report
24 Dec	19:00	Daejeon Samsung Fire Bluefangs	3–0	Ansan OK Savings Bank Rush & Cash	28–26	25–18	25–23			78–67	Report

== Postseason ==
- All times are Korea Standard Time (UTC+09:00).

Playoffs
Cheonan Hyundai Capital Skywalkers	2
Seoul Woori Card Wibee	0

Finals
Incheon Korean Air Jumbos	0
Cheonan Hyundai Capital Skywalkers	3

=== Playoffs ===
Date	Time		Score		Set 1	Set 2	Set 3	Set 4	Set 5	Total	Report
16 Mar	14:00	Cheonan Hyundai Capital Skywalkers	3–2	Seoul Woori Card Wibee	20–25	25–21	25–12	23–25	16–14	109–97	Report
18 Mar	19:00	Seoul Woori Card Wibee	0–3	Cheonan Hyundai Capital Skywalkers	30–32	22–25	12–25			64–82	Report

=== Finals ===
Date	Time		Score		Set 1	Set 2	Set 3	Set 4	Set 5	Total	Report
22 Mar	19:00	Incheon Korean Air Jumbos	2–3	Cheonan Hyundai Capital Skywalkers	32–30	18–25	25–23	22–25	10–15	107–118	Report
24 Mar	14:00	Incheon Korean Air Jumbos	2–3	Cheonan Hyundai Capital Skywalkers	25–27	22–25	25–13	25–21	13–15	110–101	Report
26 Mar	19:00	Cheonan Hyundai Capital Skywalkers	3–1	Incheon Korean Air Jumbos	25–20	30–32	25–19	25–20		105–91	Report

== Final standing ==
Rank	Team
1	Cheonan Hyundai Capital Skywalkers
2	Incheon Korean Air Jumbos
3	Seoul Woori Card Wibee
4	Daejeon Samsung Fire Bluefangs
5	Ansan OK Savings Bank Rush & Cash
6	Uijeongbu KB Insurance Stars
7	Suwon KEPCO Vixtorm
