= 2025–26 V-League (South Korea) =

South Korean volleyball league

- League: V-League
- Sport: Volleyball
- Duration: 18 October 2025 – 10 April 2026
- Teams: M: 7; W: 7

Regular season (Men's)

Regular season (Women's)

Finals
- Champions: M: Incheon Korean Air Jumbos; W: GS Caltex Seoul KIXX
- Runners-up: M: Cheonan Hyundai Capital Skywalkers; W: Gimcheon Korea Expressway Hi-pass
- Finals MVP: M: (South Korea) Jung Ji-seok; W: - (Cuba) Gyselle Silva

V-League seasons
- ← 2024–25 2026–27 →

The 2025–26 V-League season was the 22nd season of the V-League, the highest professional volleyball league in South Korea. The season ran from 18 October 2025 to 5 April 2026.

== Teams ==
=== Men's clubs ===
Location of teams in V-League Men's Clubs

2025–26 V.League (South Korea) Men's
Club	Head coach	Location	Stadium	Capacity
Busan OK Savings Bank OKman	(South Korea) Shin Young-chul	Busan	Gangseo Gymnasium	4,189
Cheonan Hyundai Capital Skywalkers	(France) Philippe Blain	Cheonan	Yu Gwan-sun Gymnasium	5,482
Daejeon Samsung Bluefangs	(South Korea) Kim Sang-woo	Daejeon	Chungmu Gymnasium	5,000
Uijeongbu KB Insurance Stars	(Brazil) Leonardo Carvalho	Uijeongbu	Uijeongbu Gymnasium	6,240
Incheon Korean Air Jumbos	(Brazil) Henan Dal Zotto	Incheon	Gyeyang Gymnasium	4,270
Seoul Woori Card WON	(Brazil) Mauricio Paes	Seoul	Jangchung Gymnasium	4,507
Suwon KEPCO Vixtorm	(South Korea) Kwon Young-Min	Suwon	Suwon Gymnasium	4,317

=== Women's clubs ===
Location of teams in V-League Women's Clubs

2025–26 V.League (South Korea) Women's
Club	Head coach	Location	Stadium	Capacity
Daejeon CheongKwanJang Red Sparks	(South Korea) Ko Hee-Jin	Daejeon	Chungmu Gymnasium	5,000
Gimcheon Korea Expressway Hi-pass	(South Korea) Kim Jong-Min	Gimcheon	Gimcheon Gymnasium	6,000
GS Caltex Seoul KIXX	(South Korea) Lee Young-taek	Seoul	Jangchung Gymnasium	4,507
Hwaseong IBK Altos	(South Korea) Kim Ho-Chul	Hwaseong	Hwaseong Gymnasium	5,158
Incheon Heungkuk Life Pink Spiders	(Japan) Tomoko Yoshihara	Incheon	Samsan World Gymnasium	7,140
Suwon Hyundai E&C Hillstate	(South Korea) Kang Sung-Hyung	Suwon	Suwon Gymnasium	4,317
Gwangju AI Peppers	(South Korea) Jang So-yeon	Gwangju	Yeomju Gymnasium	8,500

== Season standing procedure ==
1. Match won 3–0 or 3–1: 3 points for the winner, 0 points for the loser.
2. Match won 3–2: 2 points for the winner, 1 point for the loser.
3. Standings – Points, matches won, Sets ratio, Points ratio, then Result of the last match between the tied teams

== Regular season ==
- If the fourth ranked team finishes within three points of the third ranked team, a semi playoff will be held between the two teams to decide who advances to the playoff game.

=== League table (Men's) ===
Pos	Team	Pld	W	L	Pts	SR	SPR	Qualification
1	Incheon Korean Air Jumbos	36	23	13	69	1.473	1.051	Championship
2	Cheonan Hyundai Skywalkers	36	22	14	69	1.509	1.050	Playoff
3	Uijeongbu KB Insurance Stars	36	19	17	58	1.029	0.996	Semi-playoff
4	Seoul Woori Card WON	36	20	16	57	1.119	1.014	Semi-playoff
5	Suwon KEPCO Vixtorm	36	19	17	56	1.075	1.025	
6	Busan OKman	36	17	19	50	0.897	0.986	
7	Daejeon Samsung Bluefangs	36	6	30	19	0.388	0.887	

Source: League table (Men's)

=== League table (Women's) ===
Pos	Team	Pld	W	L	Pts	SR	SPR	Qualification
1	Gimcheon Korea Expressway Hi-pass	36	24	12	69	1.474	1.038	Championship
2	Suwon Hyundai E&C Hillstate	36	22	14	65	1.254	1.040	Playoff
3	GS Caltex Seoul KIXX	36	19	17	57	1.106	1.021	Semi-playoff
4	Incheon Heungkuk Life Pink Spiders	36	19	17	57	1.072	0.988	Semi-playoff
5	Hwaseong IBK Altos	36	18	18	57	1.121	1.021	
6	Gwangju AI Peppers	36	16	20	47	0.813	0.982	
7	Daejeon CheongKwanJang Red Sparks	36	8	28	26	0.462	0.911	

Source: League table (Women's)

== Final stage ==
=== Bracket (Men's) ===
Semi-playoff
3	Uijeongbu KB Insurance Stars	0
4	Seoul Woori Card WON	3

Playoff
2	Cheonan Hyundai Skywalkers	3	3
4	Seoul Woori Card WON	2	2

Championship
1	Incheon Korean Air Jumbos	3	3	0	0	3
2	Cheonan Hyundai Skywalkers	2	2	3	3	1

=== Bracket (Women's) ===
Semi-playoff
3	GS Caltex Seoul KIXX	3
4	Incheon Heungkuk Life Pink Spiders	1

Playoff
2	Suwon Hyundai E&C Hillstate	1	0
3	GS Caltex Seoul KIXX	3	3

Championship
1	Gimcheon Korea Expressway Hi-pass	1	2	1
3	GS Caltex Seoul KIXX	3	3	3

== Top Performers ==
=== Men's (Points) ===
Rank	Player	Club	Points
1	(Canada) Sharone Vernon Evans	Suwon KEPCO Vixtorm	862
2	(Spain) Andrés Villena	Uijeongbu KB Insurance Stars	829
3	(Brazil) Rafael Araujo	Seoul Woori Card WON	809
4	(Cuba) Leonardo Leyva	Cheonan Hyundai Skywalkers	758
5	(Netherlands) Michiel Ahyi	Daejeon Samsung Bluefangs	729
6	(United States) Kyle Russell	Incheon Korean Air Jumbos	673
7	(Bulgaria) Dimitar Dimitrov	Busan OKman	667
8	(Iran) Ali Haghparast	Seoul Woori Card WON	544
9	(South Korea) Heo Su-bong	Cheonan Hyundai Skywalkers	538
10	(South Korea) Jeong Gwang-in	Busan OKman	474

Source: 남자부 선수 기록

=== Women's (Points) ===
Rank	Player	Club	Points
1	(Cuba) Gyselle Silva	GS Caltex Seoul KIXX	1083
2	(Cameroon) Laetitia Moma Bassoko	Gimcheon Hi-pass	948
3	(Ukraine) Viktoriia Danchak	Hwaseong IBK Altos	918
4	(United States) Zoe Weatherington	Gwangju AI Peppers	880
5	(United States) Kari Geissberger	Suwon Hyundai Hillstate	749
6	(United States) Rebecca Latham	Incheon Heungkuk Pink Spiders	746
7	(Italy) Elisa Zanette	Daejeon Red Sparks	586
8	(Japan) Jahstice Yauchi	Suwon Hyundai Hillstate	466
9	(South Korea) Yang Hyo-jin	Suwon Hyundai Hillstate	460
10	(Japan) Shimamura Haruyo	Gwangju AI Peppers	431

Source: 여자부 선수 기록

== Player of the Round ==
=== Men's ===
Round	Player	Club
1	(Spain) Andrés Villena	Uijeongbu KB Insurance Stars
2	(United States) Kyle Russell	Incheon Korean Air Jumbos
3	(Cuba) Leonardo Leyva	Cheonan Hyundai Skywalkers
4	(Cuba) Leonardo Leyva	Cheonan Hyundai Skywalkers
5	(Brazil) Rafael Araujo	Seoul Woori Card WON
6	(Brazil) Rafael Araujo	Seoul Woori Card WON

=== Women's ===
Round	Player	Club
1	(Cuba) Gyselle Silva	GS Caltex Seoul KIXX
2	(Cameroon) Laetitia Moma Bassoko	Gimcheon Hi-pass
3	(South Korea) Kim Da-in	Suwon Hyundai Hillstate
4	(United States) Rebecca Latham	Incheon Heungkuk Pink Spiders
5	(Cuba) Gyselle Silva	GS Caltex Seoul KIXX
6	(Cuba) Gyselle Silva	GS Caltex Seoul KIXX

== Final standing ==
=== Men's League ===
Rank	Team
1st place, gold medalist(s)	Incheon Korean Air Jumbos
2nd place, silver medalist(s)	Cheonan Hyundai Skywalkers
3rd place, bronze medalist(s)	Seoul Woori Card WON
4	Uijeongbu KB Insurance Stars
5	Suwon KEPCO Vixtorm
6	Busan OKman
7	Daejeon Samsung Bluefangs

=== Women's League ===
Rank	Team
1st place, gold medalist(s)	GS Caltex Seoul KIXX
2nd place, silver medalist(s)	Gimcheon Hi-pass
3rd place, bronze medalist(s)	Suwon Hyundai E&C Hillstate
4	Incheon Heungkuk Life Pink Spiders
5	Hwaseong IBK Altos
6	Gwangju AI Peppers
7	Daejeon CheongKwanJang Red Sparks
