= 2017–18 V-League (South Korea) =

V League
- Season: 2017–18
- Dates: 14 October 2017 – 30 March 2018

The 2017–18 V-League season was the 14th season of the V-League, the highest professional volleyball league in South Korea. The season started on 14 October 2017 and finished on 30 March 2018. Cheonan Hyundai Capital Skywalkers were the defending champions in the men's league and Hwaseong IBK Altos the defending female champions.

== Teams ==
=== Men's clubs ===
Location of teams in V-League Men's Clubs

Team	Location	Stadium	Capacity
Ansan OK Savings Bank Rush & Cash	Ansan	Sangnoksu Gymnasium	2,700
Cheonan Hyundai Capital Skywalkers	Cheonan	Yu Gwan-sun Gymnasium	5,482
Daejeon Samsung Bluefangs	Daejeon	Chungmu Gymnasium	5,000
Gumi KB Insurance Stars	Gumi	Park Jeong-hee Gymnasium	6,277
Incheon Korean Air Jumbos	Incheon	Gyeyang Gymnasium	5,000 Incheon Korean Air Jumbos
Seoul Woori Card Hansae	Seoul	Jangchung Gymnasium	4,618 Jangchung Arena
Suwon KEPCO Vixtorm	Suwon	Suwon Gymnasium	4,317

=== Women's clubs ===
Location of teams in V-League Women's Clubs

Team	Location	Stadium	Capacity
Daejeon KGC	Daejeon	Chungmu Gymnasium	5,000
Gimcheon Korea Expressway Hi-pass	Gimcheon	Gimcheon Gymnasium	6,000
GS Caltex Seoul KIXX	Seoul	Jangchung Gymnasium	4,618 Jangchung Arena
Hwaseong IBK Altos	Hwaseong	Hwaseong Gymnasium	5,152 Hwaseong IBK Altos
Incheon Heungkuk Life Pink Spiders	Incheon	Gyeyang Gymnasium	5,000 Incheon Korean Air Jumbos
Suwon Hyundai Hillstate	Suwon	Suwon Gymnasium	4,317

== Season standing procedure ==
1. Match points
2. Number of matches won
3. Sets ratio
4. Points ratio
5. Result of the last match between the tied teams

Match won 3–0 or 3–1: 3 match points for the winner, 0 match points for the loser
Match won 3–2: 2 match points for the winner, 1 match point for the loser

== Regular season ==
=== League table (Male) ===
Pos	Team	Pld	W	L	Pts	SR	SPR	Qualification
1	Cheonan Hyundai Skywalkers	36	22	14	70	1.481	1.048	Finals
2	Daejeon Samsung Bluefangs	36	22	14	61	1.227	1.018	Semifinals
3	Incheon Korean Air Jumbos	36	22	14	61	1.167	1.038	Semifinals
4	Uijeongbu KB Insurance Stars	36	19	17	54	1.014	1.004	
5	Suwon KEPCO Vixtorm	36	17	19	54	0.957	0.976	
6	Seoul Woori Card Hansae	36	14	22	46	0.855	0.987	
7	Ansan Rush & Cash	36	10	26	32	0.567	0.934	

=== League table (Female) ===
Pos	Team	Pld	W	L	Pts	SR	SPR	Qualification
1	Gyeongbuk Gimcheon Hi-pass	30	21	9	62	1.667	1.075	Finals
2	Hwaseong IBK Altos	30	21	9	61	1.762	1.073	Semifinals
3	Suwon Hyundai Hillstate	30	14	16	46	1.000	1.016	Semifinals
4	GS Caltex Seoul KIXX	30	14	16	40	0.887	1.001	
5	Daejeon KGC	30	12	18	35	0.676	0.925	
6	Incheon Heungkuk Life Pink Spiders	30	8	22	26	0.566	0.919	

== Play-offs ==
=== Bracket (Male) ===
Semifinals
1	Cheonan Hyundai Skywalkers
2	Daejeon Samsung Bluefangs	3	1	1
3	Incheon Korean Air Jumbos	1	3	3

Finals
1	Cheonan Hyundai Skywalkers	3	0	0	0
2	Incheon Korean Air Jumbos	2	3	3	3

=== Bracket (Female) ===
Semifinals
1	Gimcheon Korea Expressway Hi-pass
2	Hwaseong IBK Altos	3	1	3
3	Suwon Hyundai Hillstate	0	3	0

Finals
1	Gimcheon Korea Expressway Hi-pass	3	3	3
2	Hwaseong IBK Altos	2	1	1

== Top Scorers ==
=== Men's ===
Rank	Player	Club	Points
1	(Hungary) Krisztian Padar	Seoul Woori Card Hansae	966
2	(Netherlands) Thijs Ter Horst	Daejeon Samsung Bluefangs	893
3	(Brazil) Felipe Airton Banderò	Suwon KEPCO Vixtorm	880
4	(Slovenia) Mitja Gasparini	Incheon Korean Air Jumbos	863
5	(Portugal) Alexandre Ferreira	Gumi KB Insurance Stars	832
6	(South Korea) Park Chul-woo	Daejeon Samsung Bluefangs	586
7	(South Korea) Moon Sung-min	Cheonan Hyundai Capital Skywalkers	585
8	(South Korea) Jeon Kwang-in	Suwon KEPCO Vixtorm	534
9	(South Korea) Song Myung-geun	Incheon Korean Air Jumbos	497
10	(South Korea) Jung Ji-seok	Incheon Korean Air Jumbos	492

=== Women's ===
Rank	Player	Club	Points
1	(United States) Alaina Bergsma	Daejeon KGC	864
2	(United States) Madison Kingdon	Hwaseong IBK Altos	852
3	(Senegal) Fatou Diouck	GS Caltex Seoul KIXX	811
4	(Serbia) Ivana Nešović	Gimcheon Korea Expressway Hi-pass	752
5	(South Korea) Lee Jae-yeong	Incheon Heungkuk Life Pink Spiders	555
6	(South Korea) Kang So-hee	GS Caltex Seoul KIXX	532
7	(South Korea) Yang Hyo-jin	Suwon Hyundai Hillstate	485
8	(South Korea) Park Jeong-ah	Gimcheon Korea Expressway Hi-pass	478
9	(South Korea) Elizabeth Campbell	Suwon Hyundai Hillstate	476
10	(Belarus) Kristina Mikhailenko	Incheon Heungkuk Life Pink Spiders	438

== Player of the Round ==
=== Men's ===
Round	Player	Club
1	(Hungary) Krisztian Padar	Seoul Woori Card Hansae
2	(South Korea) Park Chul-woo	Daejeon Samsung Bluefangs
3	(South Korea) Moon Sung-min	Cheonan Hyundai Capital Skywalkers
4	(South Korea) Shin Yeong-seok	Cheonan Hyundai Capital Skywalkers
5	(South Korea) Jung Ji-seok	Incheon Korean Air Jumbos
6	(Brazil) Felipe Airton Banderò	Suwon KEPCO Vixtorm

=== Women's ===
Round	Player	Club
1	(South Korea) Lee Da-yeong	Suwon Hyundai Hillstate
2	(Serbia) Ivana Nešović	Gimcheon Korea Expressway Hi-pass
3	(Serbia) Ivana Nešović	Gimcheon Korea Expressway Hi-pass
4	(United States) Madison Kingdon	Hwaseong IBK Altos
5	(Serbia) Ivana Nešović	Gimcheon Korea Expressway Hi-pass
6	(Senegal) Fatou Diouck	GS Caltex Seoul KIXX

== Final standing ==
=== Men's League ===
Rank	Team
1st place, gold medalist(s)	Incheon Korean Air Jumbos
2nd place, silver medalist(s)	Cheonan Hyundai Capital Skywalkers
3rd place, bronze medalist(s)	Daejeon Samsung Bluefangs
4	Uijeongbu KB Insurance Stars
5	Suwon KEPCO Vixtorm
6	Seoul Woori Card Hansae
7	Ansan Rush & Cash

=== Women's League ===
Rank	Team
1st place, gold medalist(s)	Gyeongbuk Gimcheon Hi-pass
2nd place, silver medalist(s)	Hwaseong IBK Altos
3rd place, bronze medalist(s)	Suwon Hyundai Hillstate
4	GS Caltex Seoul KIXX
5	Daejeon KGC
6	Incheon Heungkuk Life Pink Spiders
