= V-League (South Korea) =

South Korean professional volleyball league

- Most recent season or competition: 2025–26 V-League (South Korea)
- Sport: Volleyball
- Founded: 2005
- Founder: KOVO
- First season: 2005
- No. of teams: 7 (men); 7 (women)
- Country: South Korea
- Most recent champions: Men: Incheon Korean Air Jumbos (6th title); Women: GS Caltex Seoul Kixx (4th title)
- Most titles: Men: Daejeon Samsung Fire Bluefangs (8 titles); Women: Incheon Heungkuk Life Pink Spiders (5 titles)
- Broadcasters: KBS 1TV, KBS 2TV, KBS N Sports, SBS Sports
- Website: KOVO

The V-League is a South Korean club volleyball competition. It was founded in 2005 and currently has seven men's clubs and seven women's clubs.

== Teams ==
=== Men's clubs ===
Location of teams in V-League Men's Clubs

Team	Location	Stadium	Capacity
Busan OK Savings Bank OKman	Busan	Gangseo Indoor Gymnasium	5,000
Cheonan Hyundai Capital Skywalkers	Cheonan	Yu Gwan-sun Gymnasium	5,482
Daejeon Samsung Bluefangs	Daejeon	Chungmu Gymnasium	5,000
Incheon Korean Air Jumbos	Incheon	Gyeyang Gymnasium	4,270
Seoul Woori Card WooriWON	Seoul	Jangchung Gymnasium	4,507
Suwon KEPCO Vixtorm	Suwon	Suwon Gymnasium	4,317
Uijeongbu KB Insurance Stars	Uijeongbu	Uijeongbu Gymnasium	6,240

=== Women's clubs ===
Location of teams in V-League Women's Clubs

Team	Location	Stadium	Capacity
Daejeon KGC	Daejeon	Chungmu Gymnasium	5,000
Gimcheon Korea Expressway Hi-pass	Gimcheon	Gimcheon Gymnasium	6,000
GS Caltex Seoul KIXX	Seoul	Jangchung Gymnasium	4,507
Hwaseong IBK Altos	Hwaseong	Hwaseong Gymnasium	5,152
Incheon Heungkuk Life Pink Spiders	Incheon	Samsan World Gymnasium	7,140
Suwon Hyundai E&C Hillstate	Suwon	Suwon Gymnasium	4,317
Gwangju Pepper Bank	Gwangju	Yeomju Gymnasium	8,500

== Champions ==
=== Men's champions ===
==== Titles by season ====
Season	Champions	Runners-up
2005	Daejeon Samsung Bluefangs	Cheonan Hyundai Skywalkers
2005–06	Cheonan Hyundai Skywalkers	Daejeon Samsung Bluefangs
2006–07	Cheonan Hyundai Skywalkers	Daejeon Samsung Bluefangs
2007–08	Daejeon Samsung Bluefangs	Cheonan Hyundai Skywalkers
2008–09	Daejeon Samsung Bluefangs	Cheonan Hyundai Skywalkers
2009–10	Daejeon Samsung Bluefangs	Cheonan Hyundai Skywalkers
2010–11	Daejeon Samsung Bluefangs	Incheon Korean Air Jumbos
2011–12	Daejeon Samsung Bluefangs	Incheon Korean Air Jumbos
2012–13	Daejeon Samsung Bluefangs	Incheon Korean Air Jumbos
2013–14	Daejeon Samsung Bluefangs	Cheonan Hyundai Skywalkers
2014–15	Ansan OKman	Daejeon Samsung Bluefangs
2015–16	Ansan OKman	Cheonan Hyundai Skywalkers
2016–17	Cheonan Hyundai Skywalkers	Incheon Korean Air Jumbos
2017–18	Incheon Korean Air Jumbos	Cheonan Hyundai Skywalkers
2018–19	Cheonan Hyundai Skywalkers	Incheon Korean Air Jumbos
2019–20	Season cancelled	
2020–21	Incheon Korean Air Jumbos	Seoul Woori Card Wibee
2021–22	Incheon Korean Air Jumbos	Uijeongbu KB Insurance Stars
2022–23	Incheon Korean Air Jumbos	Cheonan Hyundai Skywalkers
2023–24	Incheon Korean Air Jumbos	Ansan OKman
2024–25	Cheonan Hyundai Skywalkers	Incheon Korean Air Jumbos
2025–26	Incheon Korean Air Jumbos	Cheonan Hyundai Skywalkers

==== Titles by club ====
Club	Champions	Runners-up
Daejeon Samsung Bluefangs	8	3
Incheon Korean Air Jumbos	6	6
Cheonan Hyundai Skywalkers	5	9
Ansan OKman	2	1
Seoul Woori Card Wibee	0	1
Uijeongbu KB Insurance Stars	0	1
Suwon KEPCO Vixtorm	0	0

=== Women's Champions ===
==== Titles by season ====
Season	Champions	Runners-up
2005	Daejeon KGC	Gimcheon Hi-pass
2005–06	Incheon Heungkuk Pink Spiders	Gimcheon Hi-pass
2006–07	Incheon Heungkuk Pink Spiders	Suwon Hyundai Hillstate
2007–08	GS Caltex Seoul KIXX	Incheon Heungkuk Pink Spiders
2008–09	Incheon Heungkuk Pink Spiders	GS Caltex Seoul KIXX
2009–10	Daejeon KGC	Suwon Hyundai Hillstate
2010–11	Suwon Hyundai Hillstate	Incheon Heungkuk Pink Spiders
2011–12	Daejeon KGC	Suwon Hyundai Hillstate
2012–13	Hwaseong IBK Altos	GS Caltex Seoul KIXX
2013–14	GS Caltex Seoul KIXX	Hwaseong IBK Altos
2014–15	Hwaseong IBK Altos	Gimcheon Hi-pass
2015–16	Suwon Hyundai Hillstate	Hwaseong IBK Altos
2016–17	Hwaseong IBK Altos	Incheon Heungkuk Pink Spiders
2017–18	Gimcheon Hi-pass	Hwaseong IBK Altos
2018–19	Incheon Heungkuk Pink Spiders	Gimcheon Hi-pass
2019–20	Season cancelled	
2020–21	GS Caltex Seoul KIXX	Incheon Heungkuk Pink Spiders
2021–22	Season cancelled	
2022–23	Gimcheon Hi-pass	Incheon Heungkuk Pink Spiders
2023–24	Suwon Hyundai Hillstate	Incheon Heungkuk Pink Spiders
2024–25	Incheon Heungkuk Life Pink Spiders	Daejeon CheongKwanJang Red Sparks
2025–26	GS Caltex Seoul KIXX	Gimcheon Hi-pass

==== Titles by club ====
Club	Champions	Runners-up
Incheon Heungkuk Life Pink Spiders	5	5
GS Caltex Seoul KIXX	4	2
Suwon Hyundai E&C	3	3
Hwaseong IBK Altos	3	3
Daejeon CheongKwanJang Red Sparks	3	1
Gimcheon Korea Expressway Corporation Hi-pass	2	5
Gwangju Pepper Bank	0	0

== Postseason results ==
Legend

- 1st – Champions
- 2nd – Runners–up
- PO – Playoff loser
- SPO – Semi–playoff loser
- — – Did not qualify
- DNP – Did not participate

=== Men ===
Teams	2005	2006	2007	2008	2009	2010	2011	2012	2013	2014	2015	2016	2017	2018	2019	2021	2022	2023	2024	2025	Total
Hyundai Capital	2nd	1st	1st	2nd	2nd	2nd	PO	PO	PO	2nd	–	2nd	1st	2nd	1st	–	–	2nd	SPO	1st	17
Korean Air	–	–	PO	PO	PO	PO	2nd	2nd	2nd	PO	–	SPO	2nd	1st	2nd	1st	1st	1st	1st	2nd	17
Samsung Fire	1st	2nd	2nd	1st	1st	1st	1st	1st	1st	1st	2nd	PO	–	PO	–	–	–	–	–	–	13
KB Insurance	PO	PO	–	–	–	–	SPO	–	–	–	–	–	–	–	–	SPO	2nd	–	–	PO	6
KEPCO	–	–	–	–	–	–	–	SPO	–	–	PO	–	PO	–	–	–	PO	PO	–	–	6
Woori Card	DNP					–	–	–	–	–	–	–	–	–	PO	2nd	SPO	SPO	PO	–	5
OK Financial Group	DNP									–	1st	1st	–	–	–	PO	–	–	2nd	–	4
Sangmu	–	–	–	–	–	–	–	–	DNP												0

=== Women ===
Teams	2005	2006	2007	2008	2009	2010	2011	2012	2013	2014	2015	2016	2017	2018	2019	2021	2023	2024	2025	Total
Heungkuk Life	–	1st	1st	2nd	1st	–	2nd	–	–	–	–	PO	2nd	–	1st	2nd	2nd	2nd	1st	12
Hyundai E&C	–	–	2nd	–	–	2nd	1st	2nd	PO	–	PO	1st		PO	–	–	PO	1st	PO	11
CheongKwanJang Red Sparks	1st	PO	–	PO	PO	1st	–	1st	–	PO	–		PO	–	–	–	–	PO	2nd	10
Korea Expressway Corporation	2nd	2nd	PO	–	–	–	PO	PO	–	–	2nd	–	–	1st	2nd	–	1st	–	–	9
IBK	DNP							–	1st	2nd	1st	2nd	1st	2nd	–	PO	–	–	–	7
GS Caltex	–	–	–	1st	2nd	PO	–	–	2nd	1st	–	–	–	–	PO	1st	–	–	–	7
Gwangju Pepper Bank	DNP															–	–	–	–	0

== MVP by edition ==
=== Regular round ===
Men

- 2005 – Hu In-jeong (KOR)
- 2005–06 – Sean Rooney (USA)
- 2006–07 – Leandro Araújo da Silva (BRA)
- 2007–08 – Anđelko Ćuk (CRO)
- 2008–09 – Park Chul-woo (KOR)
- 2009–10 – Gavin Schmitt (CAN)
- 2010–11 – Kim Hak-min (KOR)
- 2011–12 – Gavin Schmitt (CAN)
- 2012–13 – Leonardo Leyva (CUB)
- 2013–14 – Leonardo Leyva (CUB)
- 2014–15 – Leonardo Leyva (CUB)
- 2015–16 – Moon Sung-min (KOR)
- 2016–17 – Moon Sung-min (KOR)
- 2017–18 – Shin Yung-suk (KOR)
- 2018–19 – Jung Ji-seok (KOR)
- 2019–20 – Na Gyeong-Bok (KOR)
- 2020–21 – Jung Ji-seok (KOR)
- 2021–22 – Noumory Keita (MLI)
- 2022–23 – Han Sun-soo (KOR)
- 2023–24 – Leonardo Leyva (CUB)
- 2024–25 – Heo Su-bong (KOR)
- 2025–26 – Han Sun-soo (KOR)

Women

- 2005 – Jung Dae-young (KOR)
- 2005–06 – Kim Yeon-Koung (KOR)
- 2006–07 – Kim Yeon-Koung (KOR)
- 2007–08 – Kim Yeon-Koung (KOR)
- 2008–09 – Bethania de la Cruz (DOM)
- 2009–10 – Kenny Moreno (COL)
- 2010–11 – Hwang Youn-joo (KOR)
- 2011–12 – Madelaynne Montaño (COL)
- 2012–13 – Olesia Rykhliuk (UKR)
- 2013–14 – Lee Hyo-hee (KOR)
- 2014–15 – Lee Hyo-hee (KOR), Nicole Fawcett (USA)
- 2015–16 – Elizabeth McMahon (USA)
- 2016–17 – Lee Jae-yeong (KOR)
- 2017–18 – Ivana Nešović (SRB)
- 2018–19 – Lee Jae-yeong (KOR)
- 2019–20 – Yang Hyo-jin (KOR)
- 2020–21 – Kim Yeon-Koung (KOR)
- 2021–22 – Yang Hyo-jin (KOR)
- 2022–23 – Kim Yeon-Koung (KOR)
- 2023–24 – Kim Yeon-Koung (KOR)
- 2024–25 – Kim Yeon-Koung (KOR)
- 2025–26 – Gyselle Silva (CUB)

=== Final ===
Men

- 2005 – Kim Se-jin (KOR)
- 2005–06 – Sean Rooney (USA)
- 2006–07 – Sean Rooney (USA)
- 2007–08 – Anđelko Ćuk (CRO)
- 2008–09 – Choi Tae-woong (KOR)
- 2009–10 – Gavin Schmitt (CAN)
- 2010–11 – Gavin Schmitt (CAN)
- 2011–12 – Gavin Schmitt (CAN)
- 2012–13 – Leonardo Leyva (CUB)
- 2013–14 – Leonardo Leyva (CUB)
- 2014–15 – Song Myung-geun (KOR)
- 2015–16 – Robertlandy Simón (CUB)
- 2016–17 – Moon Sung-min (KOR)
- 2017–18 – Han Sun-soo (KOR)
- 2018–19 – Jeon Kwang-in (KOR)
- 2019–20 – Na Gyeong-Bok (KOR)
- 2020–21 – Jung Ji-seok (KOR)
- 2021–22 – Lincoln Williams (AUS)
- 2022–23 – Han Sun-Soo (KOR)
- 2023–24 – Jung Ji-seok (KOR)
- 2024–25 – Heo Su-bong (KOR)
- 2025–26 – Jung Ji-seok (KOR)

Women

- 2005 – Choi Kwang-hee (KOR)
- 2005–06 – Kim Yeon-Koung (KOR)
- 2006–07 – Kim Yeon-Koung (KOR)
- 2007–08 – Jung Dae-young (KOR)
- 2008–09 – Kim Yeon-Koung (KOR)
- 2009–10 – Madelaynne Montaño (COL)
- 2010–11 – Hwang Youn-joo (KOR)
- 2011–12 – Madelaynne Montaño (COL)
- 2012–13 – Olesia Rykhliuk (UKR)
- 2013–14 – Bethania de la Cruz (DOM)
- 2014–15 – Kim Sa-nee (KOR)
- 2015–16 – Yang Hyo-jin (KOR)
- 2016–17 – Madison Kingdon (USA)
- 2017–18 – Park Jeong-ah (KOR)
- 2018–19 – Lee Jae-yeong (KOR)
- 2019–20 – Yang Hyo-jin (KOR)
- 2020–21 – Merete Lutz (USA), Lee So-young (KOR)
- 2022–23 – Khat Bell (USA)
- 2023–24 – Laetitia Moma Bassoko (CMR)
- 2024–25 – Kim Yeon-Koung (KOR)
- 2025–26 – Gyselle Silva (CUB)

== Title sponsors ==
Season	Name
2005–06	KT&G
2006–07	Hyundai Hillstate
2007–08 ~ 2016–17	NH Nonghyup
2017–18 ~ 2024–25	Dodram
2025–26	Jin Air
2026–27 ~	Heungkuk Life

== See also ==
- KOVO Cup
- Korea Volleyball Federation
