= 2019–20 V-League (South Korea) =

- League: V-League
- Sport: Volleyball
- Duration: 12 October 2019 – 5 April 2020 (Cancelled)
- Games: 192
- Teams: M: 7 W: 6
- Total attendance: 393,059

Regular season (Men's)

Regular season (Women's)

Finals
- Champions: M: W:
- Runners-up: M: W:
- Finals MVP: M: W:

V-League seasons
- ← 2018–19 2020–21 →

The 2019–20 V-League season was the 16th season of the V-League, the highest professional volleyball league in South Korea. The season started in October 2019 but was postponed and then cancelled in March 2020 during Round Six because of the outbreak of the coronavirus.

== Teams ==
=== Men's clubs ===
Location of teams in V-League Men's Clubs

Team	Location	Stadium	Capacity
Ansan OK Savings Bank Rush & Cash	Ansan	Sangnoksu Gymnasium	2,700
Cheonan Hyundai Capital Skywalkers	Cheonan	Yu Gwan-sun Gymnasium	5,482
Daejeon Samsung Bluefangs	Daejeon	Chungmu Gymnasium	5,000
Uijeongbu KB Insurance Stars	Uijeongbu	Uijeongbu Gymnasium	6,240
Incheon Korean Air Jumbos	Incheon	Gyeyang Gymnasium	4,270
Seoul Woori Card Wibee	Seoul	Jangchung Gymnasium	4,507
Suwon KEPCO Vixtorm	Suwon	Suwon Gymnasium	4,317

=== Women's clubs ===
Location of teams in V-League Women's Clubs

Team	Location	Stadium	Capacity
Daejeon KGC	Daejeon	Chungmu Gymnasium	5,000
Gimcheon Korea Expressway Hi-pass	Gimcheon	Gimcheon Gymnasium	6,000
GS Caltex Seoul KIXX	Seoul	Jangchung Gymnasium	4,507
Hwaseong IBK Altos	Hwaseong	Hwaseong Gymnasium	5,152
Incheon Heungkuk Life Pink Spiders	Incheon	Gyeyang Gymnasium	4,270
Suwon Hyundai Hillstate	Suwon	Suwon Gymnasium	4,317

== Season standing procedure ==
1. Match points
2. Number of matches won
3. Sets ratio
4. Points ratio
5. Result of the last match between the tied teams
- In the men's league, if the 4th-placed team finishes within three points of the 3rd placed team, an extra league game is played between these two teams.

Match won 3–0 or 3–1: 3 match points for the winner, 0 match points for the loser
Match won 3–2: 2 match points for the winner, 1 match point for the loser

== Regular season ==
=== League table (Men's) ===
Pos	Team	Pld	W	L	Pts	SR	SPR	Qualification
1	Seoul Woori Card Wibee	32	25	7	69	1.929	1.098	Finals
2	Incheon Korean Air Jumbos	31	23	8	65	1.810	1.091	Semifinals
3	Cheonan Hyundai Skywalkers	32	19	13	56	1.352	1.031	Semifinals
4	Ansan Rush & Cash	32	16	16	50	0.984	0.973	
5	Daejeon Samsung Bluefangs	32	13	19	41	0.771	0.972	
6	Uijeongbu KB Insurance Stars	33	10	23	31	0.639	0.956	
7	Suwon KEPCO Vixtorm	32	6	26	24	0.464	0.900	

Source: League table (Men's)

=== League table (Women's) ===
Pos	Team	Pld	W	L	Pts	SR	SPR	Qualification
1	Suwon Hyundai Hillstate	27	20	7	55	1.625	1.044	Finals
2	GS Caltex Seoul KIXX	27	18	9	54	1.537	1.086	Semifinals
3	Incheon Heungkuk Life Pink Spiders	27	14	13	48	1.292	1.066	Semifinals
4	Daejeon KGC	26	13	13	36	0.932	0.977	
5	Hwaseong IBK Altos	27	8	19	25	0.582	0.918	
6	Gyeongbuk Gimcheon Hi-pass	26	7	19	22	0.561	0.920	

Source: League table (Women's)

=== Results / Fixtures - Male ===
==== Rounds 1 and 2 ====
Home \ Away	INC	CHN	ANS	DEJ	SEL	UJB	SUW
Incheon Korean Air Jumbos	—	0–3	3–2	1–3	3–0	3–1	3–0
Cheonan Hyundai Skywalkers	1–3	—	3–0	3–2	2–3	3–1	1–3
Ansan Rush & Cash	3–0	0–3	—	3–2	3–1	3–2	2–3
Daejeon Samsung Bluefangs	2–3	3–1	1–3	—	0–3	3–1	3–1
Seoul Woori Card Wibee	0–3	3–1*	3–2	3–0	—	3–2	3–0
Uijeongbu KB Insurance Stars	0–3	2–3	2–3	2–3	0–3	—	3–2
Suwon KEPCO Vixtorm	2–3	3–1	0–3	1–3	1–3	3–1	—

Updated to match(es) played on -. Source:
Legend: Blue = home team win; Yellow = draw; Red = away team win.
- = game played at away team's ground

==== Rounds 3 and 4 ====
Home \ Away	INC	CHN	ANS	DEJ	SEL	UJB	SUW
Incheon Korean Air Jumbos	—	1–3	3–0	3–0	0–3	2–3	3–2
Cheonan Hyundai Skywalkers	2–3	—	1–3	3–0	1–3	3–0	3–0
Ansan Rush & Cash	1–3	0–3	—	3–0	3–2	2–3	3–1
Daejeon Samsung Bluefangs	0–3	1–3	3–0	—	2–3	3–1	3–0
Seoul Woori Card Wibee	3–2	0–3	3–2	3–0	—	2–3	3–0
Uijeongbu KB Insurance Stars	3–1	1–3	3–0	2–3	0–3	—	1–3
Suwon KEPCO Vixtorm	0–3	0–3	0–3	3–0	1–3	1–3	—

Updated to match(es) played on unknown. Source:
Legend: Blue = home team win; Yellow = draw; Red = away team win.

==== Rounds 5 and 6 ====
Home \ Away	INC	CHN	ANS	DEJ	SEL	UJB	SUW
Incheon Korean Air Jumbos	—	18 Mar	11 Mar	3–1	7 Mar	3–0	3–0
Cheonan Hyundai Skywalkers	2–3	—	14 Mar	1–3	2–3*	3–1	5 Mar
Ansan Rush & Cash	0–3	2–3	—	6 Mar	1–3	3–1	3–1
Daejeon Samsung Bluefangs	1–3	10 Mar	1–3	—	0–3	13 Mar	3–0
Seoul Woori Card Wibee	1–3	3–0	3 Mar	17 Mar	—	3–0	12 Mar
Uijeongbu KB Insurance Stars	4 Mar	2–3	3–0	3–2	0–3	—	3–2
Suwon KEPCO Vixtorm	15 Mar	2–3	0–3	2–3	2–3	8 Mar	—

Updated to match(es) played on unknown. Source:
Legend: Blue = home team win; Yellow = draw; Red = away team win.
- = game played at away team's ground

Season postponed from March 2, and then cancelled on March 23 due to coronavirus.

Source: Game Schedule (Men's)

=== Results / Fixtures - Female ===
==== Rounds 1 and 2 ====
Home \ Away	SEL	DEJ	HWA	INC	GIM	SUW
GS Caltex Seoul KIXX	—	2–3	3–0	3–0	3–0	3–1
Daejeon KGC	1–3	—	3–2	3–2	3–2	1–3
Hwaseong IBK Altos	3–2	3–2	—	1–3	0–3	2–3
Incheon Heungkuk Life Pink Spiders	2–3	3–1	3–0	—	3–1	3–0
Gyeongbuk Gimcheon Hi-pass	1–3	2–3	3–1	3–1*	—	0–3
Suwon Hyundai Hillstate	1–3	3–1	3–1	3–2	3–0*	—

Updated to match(es) played on - all 1st round matches completed. Source:
Legend: Blue = home team win; Yellow = draw; Red = away team win.
- = game played at away team's ground

==== Rounds 3 and 4 ====
Home \ Away	SEL	DEJ	HWA	INC	GIM	SUW
GS Caltex Seoul KIXX	—	3–0	3–0	0–3	3–2	1–3
Daejeon KGC	0–3	—	2–3	2–3	3–1	1–3
Hwaseong IBK Altos	3–1	3–2	—	0–3	2–3	3–0
Incheon Heungkuk Life Pink Spiders	1–3	2–3	3–0	—	2–3*	2–3
Gyeongbuk Gimcheon Hi-pass	3–1*	1–3	3–2	1–3	—	0–3*
Suwon Hyundai Hillstate	3–0	3–2	3–1	3–2	3–1	—

Updated to match(es) played on all 2nd round matches completed. Source:
Legend: Blue = home team win; Yellow = draw; Red = away team win.
- = game played at away team's ground

==== Rounds 5 and 6 ====
Home \ Away	SEL	DEJ	HWA	INC	GIM	SUW
GS Caltex Seoul KIXX	—	7 Mar	4 Mar	3–1	3–0*	3–2
Daejeon KGC	3–2	—	3–2	3 Mar	11 Mar	14 Mar
Hwaseong IBK Altos	1–3	0–3	—	3–1	3–0	10 Mar
Incheon Heungkuk Life Pink Spiders	12 Mar	3–1	3–0	—	3–2	2–3
Gyeongbuk Gimcheon Hi-pass	1–3	1–3	15 Mar	8 Mar	—	5 Mar
Suwon Hyundai Hillstate	3–0	1–3	3–0	0–3	3–0	—

Updated to match(es) played on all 3rd round matches completed. Source:
Legend: Blue = home team win; Yellow = draw; Red = away team win.

Season postponed from March 2, and then cancelled on March 23 due to coronavirus.

Source: Game Schedule (Women's)

== Attendance ==
=== Men's teams ===
Pos	Team	Total	High	Low	Average	Change
1	Seoul Woori Card Wibee	45,098	4,165	1,273	3,221	+3.1%
2	Cheonan Hyundai Skywalkers	43,827	3,788	1,641	2,739	−17.7%
3	Daejeon Samsung Bluefangs	32,686	3,505	716	2,179	−4.1%
4	Uijeongbu KB Insurance Stars	29,364	3,287	716	1,835	−26.0%
5	Incheon Korean Air Jumbos	25,225	2,945	712	1,682	−16.4%
6	Ansan Rush & Cash	25,076	2,627	964	1,672	−12.7%
7	Suwon KEPCO Vixtorm	18,184	2,813	515	1,212	−31.8%
	League total	219,460	4,165	515	2,077	−14.9%

Updated to games played on 23 February, from the week starting 24 February, all games are closed door due to the coronavirus. From 2 March the league was postponed and then cancelled.

=== Women's teams ===
Pos	Team	Total	High	Low	Average	Change
1	GS Caltex Seoul KIXX	41,801	4,200	1,930	3,215	+10.3%
2	Suwon Hyundai Hillstate	33,108	4,654	1,857	2,547	+33.2%
3	Gyeongbuk Gimcheon Hi-pass	25,778	4,843	1,277	2,344	−25.4%
4	Incheon Heungkuk Life Pink Spiders	28,210	2,901	1,137	2,170	+2.1%
5	Daejeon KGC	23,294	2,832	1,251	2,118	−17.8%
6	Hwaseong IBK Altos	21,398	3,771	850	1,528	−37.1%
	League total	173,599	4,843	850	2,320	−7.8%

Updated to games played on 23 February, from the week starting 24 February, all games are closed door due to the coronavirus. From 2 March the league was postponed and then cancelled.

== Top Scorers ==
=== Men's ===
Rank	Player	Club	Points
1	(Spain) Andrés Villena	Incheon Korean Air Jumbos	786
2	(Canada) Gavin Schmitt	Suwon KEPCO Vixtorm	689
3	(Brazil) Felipe Airton Banderò	Seoul Woori Card Wibee	659
4	(Uganda) Daudi Okello	Cheonan Hyundai Skywalkers	548
5	(Croatia) Leo Andrić	Ansan Rush & Cash	515
6	(South Korea) Na Kyeong-buk	Seoul Woori Card Wibee	491
7	(South Korea) Park Chul-woo	Daejeon Samsung Bluefangs	444
8	(South Korea) Song Myeong-geun	Ansan Rush & Cash	436
9	(South Korea) Jeon Kwang-in	Cheonan Hyundai Skywalkers	433
10	(South Korea) Jung Ji-seok	Incheon Korean Air Jumbos	428

=== Women's ===
Rank	Player	Club	Points
1	(Italy) Valentina Diouf	Daejeon KGC	832
2	(United States) Merete Lutz	GS Caltex Seoul KIXX	678
3	(United States) Adora Anae	Hwaseong IBK Altos	559
4	(South Korea) Park Jeong-ah	Gyeongbuk Gimcheon Hi-pass	470
5	(South Korea) Lee Jae-yeong	Incheon Heungkuk Life Pink Spiders	432
6	(South Korea) Yang Hyo-jin	Suwon Hyundai Hillstate	429
7	(Argentina) Lucia Fresco	Incheon Heungkuk Life Pink Spiders	425
8	(South Korea) Kang So-hwi	GS Caltex Seoul KIXX	405
9	(United States) Hayley Spelman	Suwon Hyundai Hillstate	314
10	(South Korea) Kim Mi-yeon	Incheon Heungkuk Life Pink Spiders	301

== Player of the Round ==
=== Men's ===
Round	Player	Club
1	(South Korea) Song Myeong-geun	Ansan Rush & Cash
2	(Spain) Andrés Villena	Incheon Korean Air Jumbos
3	(Uganda) Daudi Okello	Cheonan Hyundai Skywalkers
4	(Brazil) Felipe Airton Banderò	Seoul Woori Card Wibee
5	(Spain) Andrés Villena	Incheon Korean Air Jumbos
6	-	-

=== Women's ===
Round	Player	Club
1	(South Korea) Kang So-hwi	GS Caltex Seoul KIXX
2	(United States) Merete Lutz	GS Caltex Seoul KIXX
3	(South Korea) Lee Da-yeong	Suwon Hyundai Hillstate
4	(South Korea) Yang Hyo-jin	Suwon Hyundai Hillstate
5	(Italy) Valentina Diouf	Daejeon KGC
6	-	-

== Final standing ==
=== Men's League ===
Rank	Team
1st place, gold medalist(s)	Seoul Woori Card Wibee
2nd place, silver medalist(s)	Incheon Korean Air Jumbos
3rd place, bronze medalist(s)	Cheonan Hyundai Skywalkers
4	Ansan Rush & Cash
5	Daejeon Samsung Bluefangs
6	Uijeongbu KB Insurance Stars
7	Suwon KEPCO Vixtorm

- Final placing given based on league position at time of cancellation, but no title or prize money awarded.

=== Women's League ===
Rank	Team
1st place, gold medalist(s)	Suwon Hyundai Hillstate
2nd place, silver medalist(s)	GS Caltex Seoul KIXX
3rd place, bronze medalist(s)	Incheon Heungkuk Life Pink Spiders
4	Daejeon KGC
5	Hwaseong IBK Altos
6	Gyeongbuk Gimcheon Hi-pass
