= 2009–10 V-League (South Korea) =

V League
- Season: 2009–10
- Dates: 1 November 2009 – 19 April 2010

The 2009-10 V-League season was the 6th season of the V-League, the highest professional volleyball league in South Korea. The season started on 1 November 2009 and finished on 19 April 2010. Daejeon Samsung Bluefangs were the defending champions in the men's league and Cheonan Heungkuk Pink Spiders the defending female champions.

== Teams ==
=== Men's clubs ===
Location of teams in V-League Men's Clubs

Team	Location	Stadium	Capacity
Cheonan Hyundai Capital Skywalkers	Cheonan	Yu Gwan-sun Gymnasium	5,482
Daejeon Samsung Bluefangs	Daejeon	Chungmu Gymnasium	5,000
Gumi LIG Greaters	Gumi	Park Jeong-hee Gymnasium	6,277
Incheon Korean Air Jumbos	Incheon	Dowon Gymnasium	5,000 Incheon Korean Air Jumbos
Sangmu Volleyball Team	*All games played away from home		
Seoul Woori Card Hansae	Seoul	Jangchung Gymnasium	4,618 Jangchung Arena
Suwon KEPCO Vixtorm	Suwon	Suwon Gymnasium	4,317

=== Women's clubs ===
Location of teams in V-League Women's Clubs

Team	Location	Stadium	Capacity
Daejeon KT&G	Daejeon	Chungmu Gymnasium	5,000
Gumi Korea Expressway Hi-pass	Gumi	Park Jeong-hee Gymnasium	6,277
GS Caltex Seoul KIXX	Seoul	Jangchung Gymnasium	4,618 Jangchung Arena
Incheon Heungkuk Life Pink Spiders	Incheon	Dowon Gymnasium	5,000 Incheon Korean Air Jumbos
Suwon Hyundai Hillstate	Suwon	Suwon Gymnasium	4,317

== Regular season ==
=== League table (Male) ===
Pos	Team	Pld	W	L	Pts	SR	SPR	Qualification
1	Daejeon Samsung Bluefangs	36	30	6	0.833	2.714	1.149	Finals
2	Cheonan Hyundai Skywalkers	36	26	10	0.722	1.848	1.101	Semifinals
3	Incheon Korean Air Jumbos	36	25	11	0.694	1.755	1.081	Semifinals
4	Gumi LIG Greaters	36	24	12	0.667	1.700	1.063	
5	Seoul Woori Card Hansae	36	10	26	0.278	0.540	0.929	
6	Suwon KEPCO Vixtorm	36	8	28	0.222	0.438	0.893	
7	Sangmu Volleyball Team	36	3	33	0.083	0.214	0.815	

=== League table (Female) ===
Pos	Team	Pld	W	L	Pts	SR	SPR	Qualification
1	Suwon Hyundai Hillstate	28	23	5	0.821	2.433	1.101	Finals
2	Daejeon KT&G	28	19	9	0.679	1.500	1.062	Semifinals
3	GS Caltex Seoul KIXX	28	16	12	0.571	1.239	1.025	Semifinals
4	Incheon Heungkuk Life Pink Spiders	28	8	20	0.286	0.600	0.938	
5	Gumi Korea Expressway Hi-pass	28	4	24	0.143	0.382	0.896	

== Play-offs ==
=== Bracket (Male) ===
Semifinals
1	Daejeon Samsung Bluefangs
2	Cheonan Hyundai Skywalkers	3	3	3
3	Incheon Korean Air Jumbos	1	0	0

Finals
1	Daejeon Samsung Bluefangs	3	0	33	12	3
2	Cheonan Hyundai Skywalkers	2	3	12	33	2

=== Bracket (Female) ===
Semifinals
1	Suwon Hyundai Hillstate
2	Daejeon KT&G	3	3	3
3	GS Caltex Seoul KIXX	0	0	0

Finals
1	Suwon Hyundai Hillstate	3	2	3	0	00
2	Daejeon KT&G	1	3	2	3	33

== Top Scorers ==
=== Men's ===
Rank	Player	Club	Points
1	(Canada) Gavin Schmitt	Daejeon Samsung Bluefangs	1110
2	(Venezuela) Carlos Tejeda	Gumi LIG Greaters	661
3	(South Korea) Park Chul-woo	Cheonan Hyundai Skywalkers	592
4	(South Korea) Kim Yo-han	Gumi LIG Greaters	530
5	(South Korea) Kang Young-jun	Seoul Woori Card Hansae	444
5	(South Korea) Kim Jeong-hun	Sangmu Volleyball Team	444
7	(South Korea) Shin Yung-suk	Seoul Woori Card Hansae	435
8	(South Korea) Shin Yeong-su	Incheon Korean Air Jumbos	433
9	(South Korea) Kim Hyeon-su	Seoul Woori Card Hansae	409
10	(Canada) Joel Schmuland	Suwon KEPCO Vixtorm	386

=== Women's ===
Rank	Player	Club	Points
1	(Colombia) Kenny Moreno	Suwon Hyundai Hillstate	699
2	(Colombia) Madelaynne Montaño	Daejeon KT&G	675
3	(Dominican Republic) Milagros Cabral	Gumi Korea Expressway Hi-pass	653
4	(South Korea) Hwang Youn-joo	Incheon Heungkuk Life Pink Spiders	465
5	(United States) Destinee Hooker	GS Caltex Seoul KIXX	433
6	(South Korea) Yang Hyo-jin	Suwon Hyundai Hillstate	382
7	(Puerto Rico) Karina Ocasio	Incheon Heungkuk Life Pink Spiders	369
8	(South Korea) Kim Min-ji	GS Caltex Seoul KIXX	317
9	(South Korea) Na Hye-won	GS Caltex Seoul KIXX	304
10	(South Korea) Han Song-yi	Incheon Heungkuk Life Pink Spiders	294

== Player of the Round ==
=== Men's ===
Round	Player	Club
November	(South Korea) Kim Yo-han	Gumi LIG Greaters
December	(Canada) Gavin Schmitt	Daejeon Samsung Bluefangs
January	(South Korea) Han Sun-soo	Incheon Korean Air Jumbos
February	(South Korea) Choi Tae-ung	Daejeon Samsung Bluefangs
March	(South Korea) Suk Jin-wook	Daejeon Samsung Bluefangs

=== Women's ===
Round	Player	Club
November	(Colombia) Kenny Moreno	Suwon Hyundai Hillstate
December	(Colombia) Madelaynne Montaño	Daejeon KT&G
January	(United States) Destinee Hooker	GS Caltex Seoul KIXX
February	(South Korea) Yang Hyo-jin	Suwon Hyundai Hillstate
March	(Colombia) Madelaynne Montaño	Daejeon KT&G

== Final standing ==
=== Men's League ===
Rank	Team
1st place, gold medalist(s)	Daejeon Samsung Bluefangs
2nd place, silver medalist(s)	Cheonan Hyundai Skywalkers
3rd place, bronze medalist(s)	Incheon Korean Air Jumbos
4	Gumi LIG Greaters
5	Seoul Woori Card Hansae
6	Suwon KEPCO Vixtorm
7	Sangmu Volleyball Team

=== Women's League ===
Rank	Team
1st place, gold medalist(s)	Daejeon KT&G
2nd place, silver medalist(s)	Suwon Hyundai Hillstate
3rd place, bronze medalist(s)	GS Caltex Seoul KIXX
4	Incheon Heungkuk Life Pink Spiders
5	Gumi Korea Expressway Hi-pass
