= 2010–11 V-League (South Korea) =

V League
- Season: 2010–11
- Dates: 4 December 2010 – 14 April 2011

The 2010-11 V-League season was the 7th season of the V-League, the highest professional volleyball league in South Korea. The season started on 4 December 2010 and finished on 14 April 2011. Daejeon Samsung Bluefangs were the defending champions in the men's league and Daejeon KT&G the defending female champions.

== Teams ==
=== Men's clubs ===
Location of teams in V-League Men's Clubs

Team	Location	Stadium	Capacity
Cheonan Hyundai Capital Skywalkers	Cheonan	Yu Gwan-sun Gymnasium	5,482
Daejeon Samsung Bluefangs	Daejeon	Chungmu Gymnasium	5,000
Gumi LIG Greaters	Gumi	Park Jeong-hee Gymnasium	6,277
Incheon Korean Air Jumbos	Incheon	Dowon Gymnasium	5,000 Incheon Korean Air Jumbos
Sangmu Volleyball Team	Seongnam	Seongnam Gymnasium	5,711 Seongnam Sports Complex
Seoul Woori Card Hansae	Seoul	Jangchung Gymnasium	4,618 Jangchung Arena
Suwon KEPCO Vixtorm	Suwon	Suwon Gymnasium	4,317

=== Women's clubs ===
Location of teams in V-League Women's Clubs

Team	Location	Stadium	Capacity
Daejeon KT&G	Daejeon	Chungmu Gymnasium	5,000
Seongnam Korea Expressway Hi-pass	Seongnam	Seongnam Gymnasium	5,711 Seongnam Sports Complex
GS Caltex Seoul KIXX	Seoul	Jangchung Gymnasium	4,618 Jangchung Arena
Incheon Heungkuk Life Pink Spiders	Incheon	Dowon Gymnasium	5,000 Incheon Korean Air Jumbos
Suwon Hyundai Hillstate	Suwon	Suwon Gymnasium	4,317

== Regular season ==
=== League table (Male) ===
Pos	Team	Pld	W	L	Pts	SR	SPR	Qualification
1	Incheon Korean Air Jumbos	30	25	5	0.833	3.038	1.149	Finals
2	Cheonan Hyundai Skywalkers	30	22	8	0.733	1.816	1.078	Semifinals
3	Daejeon Samsung Bluefangs	30	16	14	0.533	1.118	1.023	Semifinals
4	Gumi LIG Greaters	30	15	15	0.500	1.040	1.008	
5	Suwon KEPCO Vixtorm	30	10	20	0.333	0.627	0.965	
6	Seoul Woori Card Hansae	30	10	20	0.333	0.719	0.959	
7	Sangmu Volleyball Team	30	7	23	0.233	0.380	0.851	

=== League table (Female) ===
Pos	Team	Pld	W	L	Pts	SR	SPR	Qualification
1	Suwon Hyundai Hillstate	24	20	4	0.833	2.138	1.090	Finals
2	Seongnam Korea Expressway Hi-pass	24	15	9	0.625	1.351	1.042	Semifinals
3	Incheon Heungkuk Life Pink Spiders	24	13	11	0.542	1.136	1.036	Semifinals
4	Daejeon KT&G	24	8	16	0.333	0.745	0.964	
5	GS Caltex Seoul KIXX	24	4	20	0.167	0.381	0.878	

== Play-offs ==
=== Bracket (Male) ===
Semifinals
1	Incheon Korean Air Jumbos
2	Cheonan Hyundai Skywalkers	0	2	1
3	Daejeon Samsung Bluefangs	3	3	3

Finals
1	Incheon Korean Air Jumbos	1	2	1	2
2	Daejeon Samsung Bluefangs	3	3	3	3

=== Bracket (Female) ===
Semifinals
1	Suwon Hyundai Hillstate
2	Seongnam Korea Expressway Hi-pass	02	33	0
3	Incheon Heungkuk Life Pink Spiders	33	21	3

Finals
1	Suwon Hyundai Hillstate	3	0	3	2	33
2	Incheon Heungkuk Life Pink Spiders	0	3	2	3	21

== Top Scorers ==
=== Men's ===
Rank	Player	Club	Points
1	(Canada) Gavin Schmitt	Daejeon Samsung Bluefangs	839
2	(Bosnia and Herzegovina) Milan Pepic	Gumi LIG Greaters	635
3	(Monaco) Miloš Ćulafić	Suwon KEPCO Vixtorm	539
4	(United States) Evan Patak	Incheon Korean Air Jumbos	527
5	(South Korea) Park Jun-beom	Suwon KEPCO Vixtorm	475
6	(South Korea) Moon Sung-min	Cheonan Hyundai Skywalkers	416
7	(South Korea) Park Chul-woo	Daejeon Samsung Bluefangs	401
8	(Puerto Rico) Héctor Soto	Cheonan Hyundai Skywalkers	389
9	(South Korea) Kim Hak-min	Incheon Korean Air Jumbos	384
10	(South Korea) Ahn Jun-chan	Seoul Woori Card Hansae	356

=== Women's ===
Rank	Player	Club	Points
1	(Colombia) Madelaynne Montaño	Daejeon KT&G	591
2	(Croatia) Mia Jerkov	Incheon Heungkuk Life Pink Spiders	462
3	(Canada) Sarah Pavan	Seongnam Korea Expressway Hi-pass	430
4	(Colombia) Kenny Moreno	Suwon Hyundai Hillstate	393
5	(South Korea) Han Song-yi	Incheon Heungkuk Life Pink Spiders	352
6	(South Korea) Yang Hyo-jin	Suwon Hyundai Hillstate	346
7	(South Korea) Hwang Yeon-joo	Suwon Hyundai Hillstate	339
8	(South Korea) Kim Min-ji	GS Caltex Seoul KIXX	256
9	(South Korea) Ju Ye-na	Incheon Heungkuk Life Pink Spiders	222
10	(South Korea) Jung Dae-young	GS Caltex Seoul KIXX	217

== Player of the Round ==
=== Men's ===
Round	Player	Club
December	(South Korea) Kim Hak-min	Incheon Korean Air Jumbos
January	(South Korea) Evan Patak	Incheon Korean Air Jumbos
February	(Canada) Gavin Schmitt	Daejeon Samsung Bluefangs

=== Women's ===
Round	Player	Club
December	(South Korea) Hwang Min-kyung	Seongnam Korea Expressway Hi-pass
January	(South Korea) Lim Hyo-sook	Seongnam Korea Expressway Hi-pass
February	(Colombia) Madelaynne Montaño	Daejeon KT&G

== Final standing ==
=== Men's League ===
Rank	Team
1st place, gold medalist(s)	Daejeon Samsung Bluefangs
2nd place, silver medalist(s)	Incheon Korean Air Jumbos
3rd place, bronze medalist(s)	Cheonan Hyundai Skywalkers
4	Gumi LIG Greaters
5	Suwon KEPCO Vixtorm
6	Seoul Woori Card Hansae
7	Sangmu Volleyball Team

=== Women's League ===
Rank	Team
1st place, gold medalist(s)	Suwon Hyundai Hillstate
2nd place, silver medalist(s)	Incheon Heungkuk Life Pink Spiders
3rd place, bronze medalist(s)	Seongnam Korea Expressway Hi-pass
4	Daejeon KT&G
5	GS Caltex Seoul KIXX
