= 2016–17 V-League (South Korea) =

V League
- Season: 2016-17
- Dates: 15 October 2016 – 3 April 2017

The 2016–17 V-League season was the 13th season of the V-League, the highest professional volleyball league in South Korea. The season started on 15 October 2016 and finished on 3 April 2017. Ansan OK Savings Bank Rush & Cash were the defending champions in the men's league and Suwon Hyundai Engineering & Construction Hillstate the defending female champions.

== Teams ==
=== Men's clubs ===
Location of teams in V-League Men's Clubs

Team	Location	Stadium	Capacity
Ansan OK Savings Bank Rush & Cash	Ansan	Sangnoksu Gymnasium	2,700
Cheonan Hyundai Capital Skywalkers	Cheonan	Yu Gwan-sun Gymnasium	5,482
Daejeon Samsung Bluefangs	Daejeon	Chungmu Gymnasium	5,000
Gumi KB Insurance Stars	Gumi	Park Jeong-hee Gymnasium	6,277
Incheon Korean Air Jumbos	Incheon	Gyeyang Gymnasium	5,000 Incheon Korean Air Jumbos
Seoul Woori Card Hansae	Seoul	Jangchung Gymnasium	4,618 Jangchung Arena
Suwon KEPCO Vixtorm	Suwon	Suwon Gymnasium	4,317

=== Women's clubs ===
Location of teams in V-League Women's Clubs

Team	Location	Stadium	Capacity
Daejeon KGC	Daejeon	Chungmu Gymnasium	5,000
Gimcheon Korea Expressway Hi-pass	Gimcheon	Gimcheon Gymnasium	6,000
GS Caltex Seoul KIXX	Seoul	Jangchung Gymnasium	4,618 Jangchung Arena
Hwaseong IBK Altos	Hwaseong	Hwaseong Gymnasium	5,152 Hwaseong IBK Altos
Incheon Heungkuk Life Pink Spiders	Incheon	Gyeyang Gymnasium	5,000 Incheon Korean Air Jumbos
Suwon Hyundai Hillstate	Suwon	Suwon Gymnasium	4,317

== Season standing procedure ==
1. Match points
2. Number of matches won
3. Sets ratio
4. Points ratio
5. Result of the last match between the tied teams

Match won 3–0 or 3–1: 3 match points for the winner, 0 match points for the loser
Match won 3–2: 2 match points for the winner, 1 match point for the loser

== Regular season ==
=== League table (Male) ===
Pos	Team	Pld	W	L	Pts	SR	SPR	Qualification
1	Incheon Korean Air Jumbos	36	25	11	72	1.545	1.052	Finals
2	Cheonan Hyundai Skywalkers	36	23	13	68	1.466	1.043	Semifinals
3	Suwon KEPCO Vixtorm	36	22	14	62	1.171	1.011	Semifinals
4	Daejeon Samsung Bluefangs	36	18	18	58	1.100	0.996	
5	Seoul Woori Card Hansae	36	17	19	55	1.014	1.012	
6	Uijeongbu KB Insurance Stars	36	14	22	43	0.788	0.983	
7	Ansan Rush & Cash	36	7	29	20	0.394	0.908	

=== League table (Female) ===
Pos	Team	Pld	W	L	Pts	SR	SPR	Qualification
1	Incheon Heungkuk Life Pink Spiders	30	20	10	59	1.558	1.049	Finals
2	Hwaseong IBK Altos	30	18	12	56	1.477	1.064	Semifinals
3	Daejeon KGC	30	15	15	44	0.946	0.997	Semifinals
4	Suwon Hyundai Hillstate	30	14	16	41	0.918	0.989	
5	GS Caltex Seoul KIXX	30	12	18	37	0.803	0.980	
6	Gyeongbuk Gimcheon Hi-pass	30	11	19	33	0.657	0.932	

== Play-offs ==
=== Bracket (Male) ===
Semifinals
1	Incheon Korean Air Jumbos
2	Cheonan Hyundai Skywalkers	3	3
3	Suwon KEPCO Vixtorm	0	0

Finals
1	Incheon Korean Air Jumbos	3	2	3	0	1
2	Cheonan Hyundai Skywalkers	0	3	1	3	3

=== Bracket (Female) ===
Semifinals
1	Incheon Heungkuk Life Pink Spiders
2	Hwaseong IBK Altos	3	2	3
3	Daejeon KGC	1	3	1

Finals
1	Incheon Heungkuk Life Pink Spiders	3	1	2	1
2	Hwaseong IBK Altos	2	3	3	3

== Top Scorers ==
=== Men's ===
Rank	Player	Club	Points
1	(Netherlands) Thijs Ter Horst	Daejeon Samsung Bluefangs	1065
2	(Hungary) Krisztian Padar	Seoul Woori Card Hansae	965
3	(Hungary) Arpad Baroti	Suwon KEPCO Vixtorm	876
4	(Belarus) Artur Udrys	Gumi KB Insurance Stars	831
5	(Slovenia) Mitja Gasparini	Incheon Korean Air Jumbos	823
6	(South Korea) Moon Sung-min	Cheonan Hyundai Capital Skywalkers	739
7	(South Korea) Jeon Gwang-in	Suwon KEPCO Vixtorm	583
8	(South Korea) Mohammed	Ansan OK Savings Bank Rush & Cash	527
9	(South Korea) Kim Hak-min	Incheon Korean Air Jumbos	488
10	(South Korea) Park Cheol-wu	Daejeon Samsung Bluefangs	445

=== Women's ===
Rank	Player	Club	Points
1	(United States) Alaina Coble	Daejeon KGC	854
2	(Canada) Alexa Gray	GS Caltex Seoul KIXX	792
3	(Canada) Tabitha Love	Incheon Heungkuk Life Pink Spiders	758
4	(United States) Madison Kingdon	Hwaseong IBK Altos	742
5	(United States) Emily Hartong	Suwon Hyundai Hillstate	609
6	(South Korea) Lee Jae-yeong	Incheon Heungkuk Life Pink Spiders	479
7	(South Korea) Park Jeong-ah	Hwaseong IBK Altos	460
8	(South Korea) Lee So-yeong	GS Caltex Seoul KIXX	427
9	(South Korea) Yang Hyo-jin	Suwon Hyundai Hillstate	406
10	(South Korea) Hwang Youn-joo	Suwon Hyundai Hillstate	395

== Player of the Round ==
=== Men's ===
Round	Player	Club
1	(Hungary) Krisztian Padar	Seoul Woori Card Hansae
2	(South Korea) Cheon Gwang-in	Suwon KEPCO Vixtorm
3	(South Korea) Moon Sung-min	Cheonan Hyundai Capital Skywalkers
4	(Hungary) Krisztian Padar	Seoul Woori Card Hansae
5	(South Korea) Kim Hak-min	Incheon Korean Air Jumbos
6	(South Korea) Moon Sung-min	Cheonan Hyundai Capital Skywalkers

=== Women's ===
Round	Player	Club
1	(South Korea) Park Jeong-ah	Hwaseong IBK Altos
2	(South Korea) Lee Jae-yeong	Incheon Heungkuk Life Pink Spiders
3	(South Korea) Hwang Yeon-ju	Suwon Hyundai Hillstate
4	(United States) Alaina Coble	Daejeon KGC
5	(South Korea) Lee Ko-eun	Hwaseong IBK Altos
6	(United States) Alaina Coble	Daejeon KGC

== Final standing ==
=== Men's League ===
Rank	Team
1st place, gold medalist(s)	Cheonan Hyundai Capital Skywalkers
2nd place, silver medalist(s)	Incheon Korean Air Jumbos
3rd place, bronze medalist(s)	Suwon KEPCO Vixtorm
4	Daejeon Samsung Bluefangs
5	Seoul Woori Card Hansae
6	Uijeongbu KB Insurance Stars
7	Ansan Rush & Cash

=== Women's League ===
Rank	Team
1st place, gold medalist(s)	Hwaseong IBK Altos
2nd place, silver medalist(s)	Incheon Heungkuk Life Pink Spiders
3rd place, bronze medalist(s)	Daejeon KGC
4	Suwon Hyundai Hillstate
5	GS Caltex Seoul KIXX
6	Gyeongbuk Gimcheon Hi-pass
