= 2012–13 V-League (South Korea) =

V League
- Season: 2012–13
- Dates: 2 November 2012 – 31 March 2013

The 2012-13 V-League season was the 9th season of the V-League, the highest professional volleyball league in South Korea. The season started on 2 November 2012 and finished on 31 March 2013. Daejeon Samsung Bluefangs were the defending champions in the men's league and Daejeon KGC the defending female champions.

== Teams ==
=== Men's clubs ===
Location of teams in V-League Men's Clubs

Team	Location	Stadium	Capacity
Cheonan Hyundai Capital Skywalkers	Cheonan	Yu Gwan-sun Gymnasium	5,482
Daejeon Samsung Bluefangs	Daejeon	Chungmu Gymnasium	5,000
Gumi LIG Greaters	Gumi	Park Jeong-hee Gymnasium	6,277
Incheon Korean Air Jumbos	Incheon	Gyeyang Gymnasium	5,000 Incheon Korean Air Jumbos
Asan Woori Card Hansae	Asan	Yi Sun-sin Icerink Gymnasium	3,303 Asan Woori Bank Wibee
Suwon KEPCO Vixtorm	Suwon	Suwon Gymnasium	4,317

=== Women's clubs ===
Location of teams in V-League Women's Clubs

Team	Location	Stadium	Capacity
Daejeon KGC	Daejeon	Chungmu Gymnasium	5,000
Seongnam Korea Expressway Hi-pass	Seongnam	Seongnam Gymnasium	5,711 Seongnam Sports Complex
Gumi GS Caltex KIXX	Gumi	Park Jeong-hee Gymnasium	6,277
Hwaseong IBK Altos	Hwaseong	Hwaseong Gymnasium	5,152 Hwaseong IBK Altos
Incheon Heungkuk Life Pink Spiders	Incheon	Dowon Gymnasium	5,000 Incheon Korean Air Jumbos
Suwon Hyundai Hillstate	Suwon	Suwon Gymnasium	4,317

== Season standing procedure ==
1. Match points
2. Number of matches won
3. Sets ratio
4. Points ratio
5. Result of the last match between the tied teams

Match won 3–0 or 3–1: 3 match points for the winner, 0 match points for the loser
Match won 3–2: 2 match points for the winner, 1 match point for the loser

== Regular season ==
=== League table (Male) ===
Pos	Team	Pld	W	L	Pts	SR	SPR	Qualification
1	Daejeon Samsung Bluefangs	30	24	6	70	2.257	1.123	Finals
2	Cheonan Hyundai Skywalkers	30	18	12	52	1.288	1.021	Semifinals
3	Incheon Korean Air Jumbos	30	17	13	52	1.229	1.029	Semifinals
4	Asan Rush and Cash Dream Six	30	16	14	47	0.982	0.988	
5	Gumi LIG Greaters	30	13	17	42	0.964	0.992	
6	Suwon KEPCO Vixtorm	30	2	28	7	0.227	0.857	

=== League table (Female) ===
Pos	Team	Pld	W	L	Pts	SR	SPR	Qualification
1	Hwaseong IBK Altos	30	20	10	62	1.674	1.064	Finals
2	Gumi GS Caltex KIXX	30	19	11	49	1.085	0.973	Semifinals
3	Suwon Hyundai Hillstate	30	15	15	43	0.935	1.024	Semifinals
4	Seongnam Korea Expressway Hi-pass	30	13	17	42	0.902	0.989	
5	Incheon Heungkuk Life Pink Spiders	30	13	17	41	0.892	0.994	
6	Daejeon KGC	30	10	20	33	0.738	0.959	

== Play-offs ==
=== Bracket (Male) ===
Semifinals
1	Daejeon Samsung Bluefangs
2	Cheonan Hyundai Skywalkers	2	0
3	Incheon Korean Air Jumbos	3	3

Finals
1	Daejeon Samsung Bluefangs	3	3	3
2	Incheon Korean Air Jumbos	1	1	0

=== Bracket (Female) ===
Semifinals
1	Hwaseong IBK Altos
2	Gumi GS Caltex KIXX	3	3
3	Suwon Hyundai Hillstate	1	1

Finals
1	Hwaseong IBK Altos	3	3	2	3
2	Gumi GS Caltex KIXX	1	1	3	1

== Top Scorers ==
=== Men's ===
Rank	Player	Club	Points
1	(Cuba) Leonardo Leyva	Daejeon Samsung Bluefangs	867
2	(Slovenia) Mitja Gasparini	Cheonan Hyundai Skywalkers	741
3	(Slovakia) Martin Nemec	Incheon Korean Air Jumbos	666
4	(Croatia) Andelko Ćuk	Suwon KEPCO Vixtorm	596
5	(Cuba) Oriol Camejo	Gumi LIG Greaters	594
6	(United Kingdom) Dami Bakare	Asan Rush and Cash Dream Six	567
7	(South Korea) Moon Sung-min	Cheonan Hyundai Skywalkers	531
8	(South Korea) Kim Hak-min	Incheon Korean Air Jumbos	448
9	(South Korea) Park Chul-woo	Daejeon Samsung Bluefangs	403
10	(South Korea) Kim Yo-han	Gumi LIG Greaters	312

=== Women's ===
Rank	Player	Club	Points
1	(United States) Nicole Fawcett	Seongnam Korea Expressway Hi-pass	875
2	(Ukraine) Olesia Rykhliuk	Hwaseong IBK Altos	825
3	(United States) Whitney Dosty	Incheon Heungkuk Life Pink Spiders	762
4	(Azerbaijan) Jana Matiasovska-Aghayeva	Suwon Hyundai Hillstate	610
5	(Dominican Republic) Bethania de la Cruz	Gumi GS Caltex KIXX	554
6	(South Korea) Yang Hyo-jin	Suwon Hyundai Hillstate	476
7	(South Korea) Baek Mok-hwa	Daejeon KGC	412
8	(South Korea) Han Song-yi	Gumi GS Caltex KIXX	392
9	(South Korea) Kim Hee-jin	Hwaseong IBK Altos	374
10	(South Korea) Park Jeong-ah	Hwaseong IBK Altos	344

== Player of the Round ==
=== Men's ===
Round	Player	Club
1	(Cuba) Leonardo Leyva	Daejeon Samsung Bluefangs
2	(South Korea) Moon Sung-min	Cheonan Hyundai Skywalkers
3	(South Korea) Shin Yeong-seok	Asan Rush and Cash Dream Six
4	(South Korea) Park Chul-woo	Daejeon Samsung Bluefangs
5	(Cuba) Leonardo Leyva	Daejeon Samsung Bluefangs
6	(South Korea) Kim Hak-min	Incheon Korean Air Jumbos

=== Women's ===
Round	Player	Club
1	(Dominican Republic) Bethania de la Cruz	GS Caltex Seoul KIXX
2	(South Korea) Kim Hee-jin	Hwaseong IBK Altos
3	(South Korea) Yang Hyo-jin	Suwon Hyundai Hillstate
4	(South Korea) Yang Hyo-jin	Suwon Hyundai Hillstate
5	(United States) Nicole Fawcett	Seongnam Korea Expressway Hi-pass
6	(Ukraine) Olesia Rykhliuk	Hwaseong IBK Altos

== Final standing ==
=== Men's League ===
Rank	Team
1st place, gold medalist(s)	Daejeon Samsung Bluefangs
2nd place, silver medalist(s)	Incheon Korean Air Jumbos
3rd place, bronze medalist(s)	Cheonan Hyundai Skywalkers
4	Asan Rush and Cash Dream Six
5	Gumi LIG Greaters
6	Suwon KEPCO Vixtorm

=== Women's League ===
Rank	Team
1st place, gold medalist(s)	Hwaseong IBK Altos
2nd place, silver medalist(s)	Gumi GS Caltex KIXX
3rd place, bronze medalist(s)	Suwon Hyundai Hillstate
4	Seongnam Korea Expressway Hi-pass
5	Incheon Heungkuk Life Pink Spiders
6	Daejeon KGC
