= Leonardo Leyva =

Cuban volleyball player (born 1990)

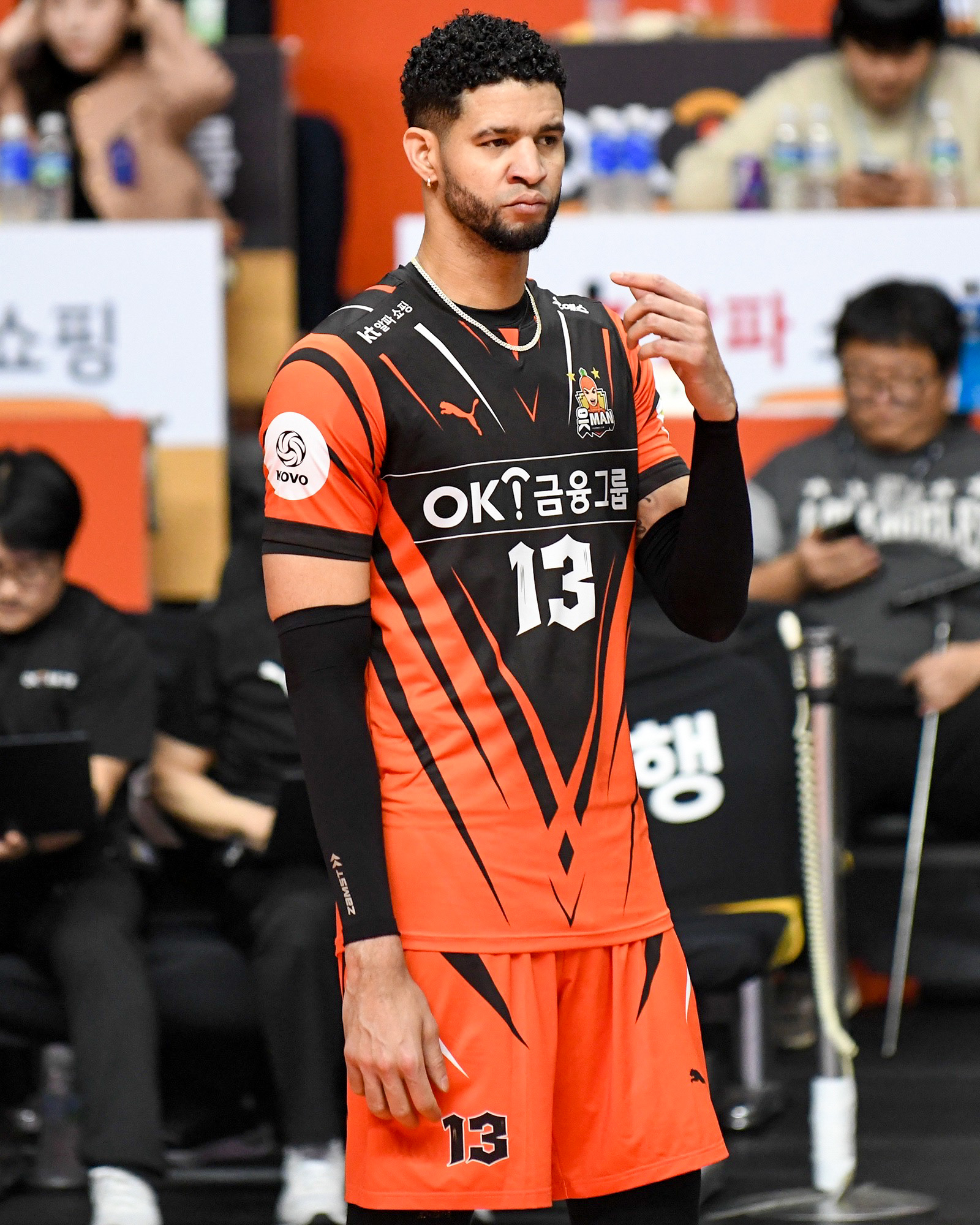
- Leyva in 2024

Personal information
- Full name: Leonardo Leyva Martínez
- Nickname: King leo
- Nationality: Cuban
- Born: March 23, 1990 (age 36)
- Height: 207 cm (6 ft 9 in)
- Weight: 73 kg (161 lb)
- Spike: 378 cm (149 in)
- Block: 350 cm (138 in)

Volleyball information
- Position: Outside hitter
- Current club: Hyundai Capital Skywalkers
- Number: 6

Career
| Years | Teams |
|---|---|
| 2009; 2011–2012; 2012; 2012–2012; 2012–2015; 2015–2016; 2016–2018; 2018-2020; 2020-2021; 2021- | Ciudad de la Habana; Cariduros de Fajardo; Al Arabi Ad-Dauha; Fakel Novy Urengoy; Daejeon Samsung Bluefangs; Ziraat Bankası Ankara; Sichuan Chengdu; Beijing Baic Motor; Al Jazira; Ansan OKman |

National team
| 2009–2011 | Cuba |

Leonardo Leyva Martínez (born March 23, 1990) is a Cuban male volleyball player. He was part of the Cuba men's national volleyball team. He has played professionally in Cuba, Puerto Rico, Russia, Qatar, South Korea, Turkey, China and the United Arab Emirates.

He currently plays for Ansan OKman.

== Sporting achievements ==
=== Clubs ===
==== Liga de Voleibol Superior Masculino ====
- 2011/2012 - with Cariduros de Fajardo

==== V-League ====
- 2012/2013 - with Daejeon Samsung Bluefangs
- 2013/2014 - with Daejeon Samsung Bluefangs

=== Individually ===
- 2011 Liga de Voleibol Superior Masculino - Most Valuable Player
- 2012 V-League - Most Valuable Player
- 2012 V-League - Best Spiker
- 2012 V-League - Best Scorer
- 2013 V-League - Most Valuable Player
- 2013 V-League - Best Spiker
- 2013 V-League - Best Scorer
- 2014 V-League - Most Valuable Player
- 2014 V-League - Best Receiver

=== Record ===
Leonardo Leyva established a new world record in scoring for a four-set match. Leyva undisputed leader of the Samsung Blue Fangs club, scored 53 points against Korean Air Jumbo.
