= Gyselle Silva =

Cuban volleyball player (born 1991)

Personal information
- Full name: Gyselle de la Caridad Silva Franco
- Nickname: Yiyi
- Nationality: Cuba; Azerbaijan
- Born: 29 October 1991 (age 35); Santiago de Cuba
- Hometown: Santiago de Cuba
- Height: 1.90 m (6 ft 3 in)
- Weight: 70 kg (154 lb)
- Spike: 317 cm (125 in)
- Block: 309 cm (122 in)

Volleyball information
- Position: Opposite Hitter
- Current club: (South Korea) GS Caltex Seoul KIXX
- Number: 5

Career
Years	Teams
2009–2012; 2014–2015; 2015–2016; 2016–2017; 2017–2018; 2018–2019; 2019–2020; 2021–2022; 2022–2023; 2023–	Santiago de Cuba; Rabita Baku; Halkbank Ankara; Yunnan University Dianchi College; Smart Prepaid Giga Hitters; Reale Mutua Fenera Chieri; Grupa Azoty Chemik Police; IŁ Capital Legionovia Legionowo; AEK Athens; GS Caltex Seoul KIXX

National team
2009–2012	Cuba
Honours
Women's volleyball
Representing Cuba
Pan American Games
Silver medal – second place	2011 Guadalajara	Team

Gyselle de la Caridad Silva Franco (born 29 October 1991) is a Cuban volleyball player. She is currently playing for the South Korean club GS Caltex Seoul KIXX in the V-League. She was part of the Cuba women's national volleyball team.

She participated at the 2010 FIVB Volleyball Women's World Championship in Japan. She played with Santiago de Cuba.

Dubbed as "Volleyball Goddess" and "Queen of Gravity" by Filipino fans.

She tallied the fourth-best scoring record in the whole world in a single match. She scored 56 points highlighted by 53 attacks and 3 aces on a lost cause after succumbing against the Cocolife Asset Managers last April 7, 2018, in a five-set conquest in a match in the inaugural Philippine Super Liga (PSL).

In May 2022, she signed a one-year contract with AEK Athens.

== Clubs ==
- Santiago de Cuba (2009–2012)
- (Azerbaijan) Rabita Baku (2014–2015)
- (Turkey) Halkbank Ankara (2015–2016)
- (China) Yunnan University Dianchi College (2016–2017)
- (Philippines) Smart Prepaid Giga Hitters (2017–2018)
- (Italy) Reale Mutua Fenera Chieri (2018–2019)
- (Poland) Grupa Azoty Chemik Police (2019–2020)
- (Poland) IŁ Capital Legionovia Legionowo (2021–2022)
- (Greece) AEK Athens (2022–2023)
- (South Korea) GS Caltex Seoul KIXX (2023–)
