= Anđelko Ćuk =

Volleyball player (born 1983)

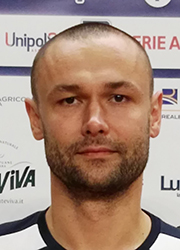
- Andelko Cuk at Legavolley 2017

Personal information
- Nationality: Serbian
- Born: 30 May 1983 (age 43)

Anđelko Ćuk (born 30 May 1983) is a volleyball player.

== Clubs ==
- OK Ljubinje (1999–2001)
- Radnik Bijeljina (2001–2002)
- HAOK Mladost (2002–2007)
- Daejeon Samsung Bluefangs (2007–2009)
- Toyoda Gosei Trefuerza (2009–2011)
- Suwon KEPCO Vixtorm (2011–2013)
- ACH Volley (2013–2014)
- Al-Ain SCC (2014)
- Pamvohaikos V.C. (2014–2015)
- Speedball Chekka (2015–2016)
- Maccabi Tel Aviv (2016–2017)
- Acqua Fonteviva Massa (2017–2018)
- Partizan Belgrade (2018/19)
- Hapoel Mate (2019)
- Jedinsto Stara Pazova (2019–2020)
- Radnik Bijeljina (2020/2021)
