= Kenny Moreno =

Colombian volleyball player and coach

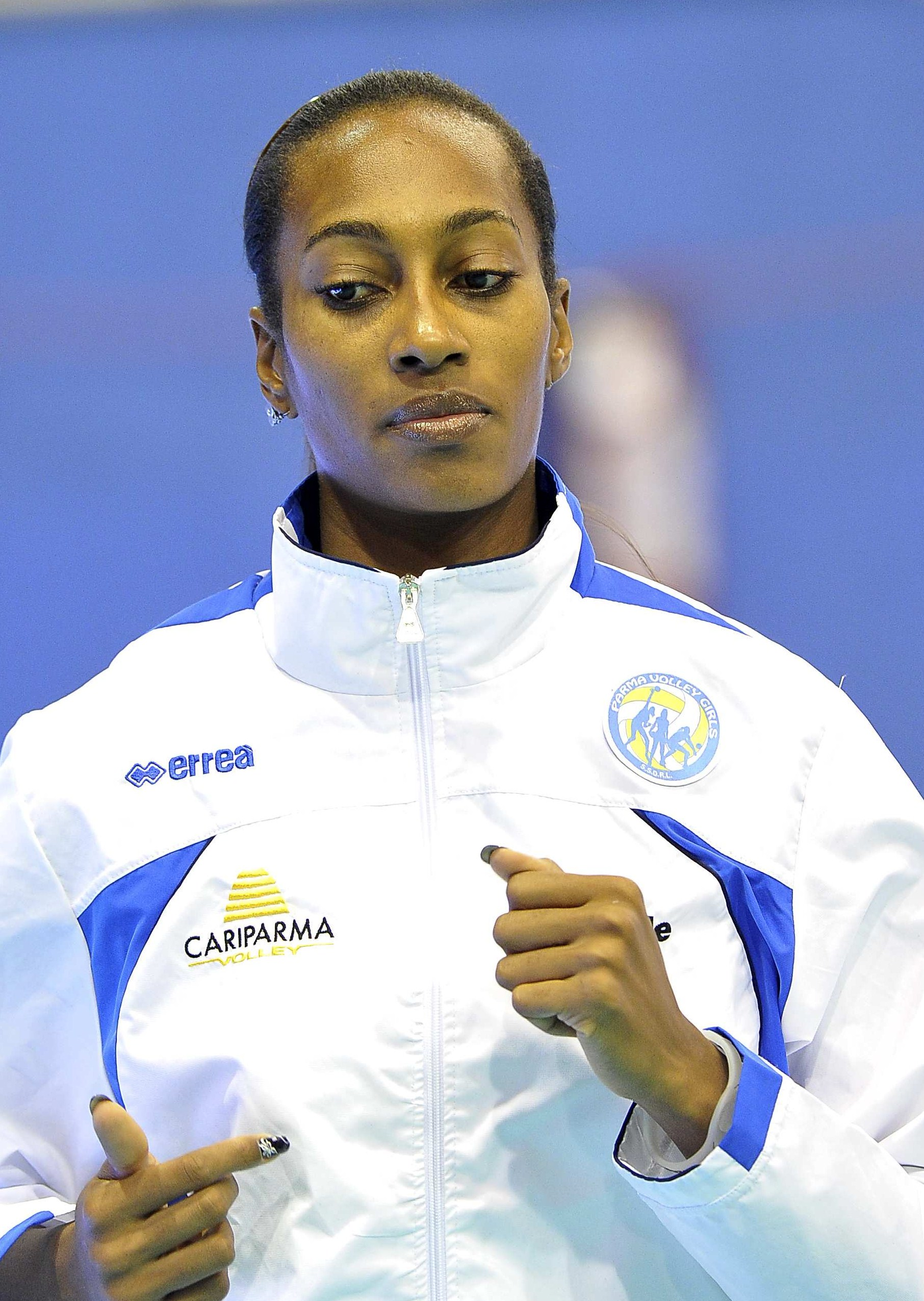

Personal information
- Full name: Kenny Moreno Pino
- Nationality: Colombian
- Born: January 6, 1979 (age 47); Turbo, Antioquia, Colombia
- Hometown: Medellín, Colombia
- Height: 1.84 m (6 ft 1/2 in)
- Weight: 60 kg (130 lb)
- Spike: 290 cm (110 in)
- Block: 300 cm (120 in)

Volleyball information
- Position: Wing Spiker

National team
2005-2017	Colombia
- Last updated: March 2017

Kenny Moreno Pino (born January 6, 1979, in Turbo, Antioquia) is a volleyball player and coach from Colombia, who won with her team the bronze medal at the 2005 Bolivarian Games.

== Personal life ==
Moreno is 185 cm (6 ft 1 in) tall 60 kilograms (130 lb), born on January 6, 1979, in Turbo, Antioquia, Colombia. Her parents are Ciriaco and Ubaldina, and she has a sister named Yesmina who was also volleyball player and two times NAIA All-American with Columbia College.

Moreno started dentistry in the Cooperative University of Colombia in Medellin, Colombia but dropped after three semesters before turning to professional volleyball. She speaks fluently Spanish, English, Portuguese and Italian. She studied Physical education in the University of Rome Tor Vergata. She is married since 2012.

After taking the professional training in the Accademia Toscana del Benessere, she opened a tattoo and massage parlor in Rieti.

== Career ==
After winning the 1998 Colombian national championship with the team representing Antioquia, Moreno played under the guidance of the Cuban coach Carlos Sánchez Vásquez with the Colombian champion, Orgullo Paisa-Lotto Lottín that won the berth to play the 1998 South American Club Championship in Medellin, Colombia. Orgullo Paisa ranked last in sixth place, nonetheless she earned the Best Spiker award and the tournament's champion, the Brazilian club Leites Nestlé signed her for the 1998-99 season. She was offered a US$500.00 monthly contract, but she complained that her national federation asked her a US$6,000.00 transfer fee.

Playing for the Brazilian Superliga club Leites Nestlé as a 19 years old, she was a revelation when she played coming from the bench and was praised for the club's head coach Sérgio Negrão. She participated with the team in the Copa Sul and winning the Campeonato Paulista until she was transferred on December 5, 1998 on-loan to another Brazilian Superliga club, Recreativa de Ribeirão Preto, because she would not get enough chance of play with Nestlé during the Superliga regular season. The transfer agreement expressed that all the Moreno expenses would be covered by Leites Nestlé. For her performance with Recreativa, she was selected to play the Brazilian Superliga All-Star game with the foreigners club in February 1999. She helped her Brazilian club to a tied tenth place with a 2-20 mark.

Moreno played professionally with the Argentinian club La Bancaria de Catamarca, playing with this club from 1999 to 2001, when she was first runner-up in the Argentinian League.

She studied and played at Columbia College, winning the 2001 NAIA national volleyball championship with a perfect record of 38-0. That season she won the "All-American First Team", "All-Conference", "All-Region" and "Freshman of the Year" awards playing with her sister Yesmina Moreno Pino, who also won the "All-American" Award. In 2002, she won the Columbia College athlete of the 2001-02 year award and was among the nominees of the Columbia Awards Sportswomen of the Year for Collegiate Sportswomen of the year.

She signed with the Italian club Sartori Mercedes Padova, finishing the season as the second best scorer with 585 points.

Moreno participated at the Powerade All Star Game 2004 from the Italian League, while participating with Infotel Europa Systems Forlì.

With the Colombian national team, she won the 2005 Bolivarian Games bronze medal.

Moreno played for the Japanese club JT Marvelous for the 2006-07 season leading the league in scoring with 754 points and her club to the league's second place and being awarded Best 6, Best Scorer and Fighting Award. At the 2007 - 56ª Kurowashiki All-Japan Volleyball Tournament her team finished second and she was chosen among the tournament's Best 6, same as the 2008 57ª version. She later confessed that she could polish her skills because of the different volleyball style played in Japan. She returned with the same club the next season, but they settled with the eightieth place beside her season's 617 points. Also said that she had offers from the Montenegro and Kazakhstan national teams that could lead her to European Championships or even the 2012 Summer Olympics.

After two years in Japan, she moved to Italy and played the 2008-09 season with the Italian club Acqua & Sapone Città di Aprilia, in order to be close to her Italian fiancé. Cumulating 709 points and a 27.27 points per game average, she was the A2 Italian League Best Scorer, setting a new scoring record.

In 2011, Moreno participated with her national team that pursued the dream of a berth for the 2012 Summer Olympics, training in Cali for three month and touring through Italy, Greece, Romania and Spain for one month. She later joined the Italian club Cariparma SiGrade Volley for the 2011-12 season, scoring 40 points in that November, for the third time in her career.

On January 22, 2012, Cariparma SiGrade agreed to transfer Moreno to the Azerbaijani club Igtisadchi Baku, after the later gave an important offer to her. She finished the season in Azerbaijan in fourth place with a 11-19.

Moreno served as assistant coach of Andrea Broccoletti for the Italian junior club Fortitudo Città di Rieti for the 2012 season. And while planning her wedding, she was called by the Italian club Robursport Volley Pesaro to play the A1 Italian League for the 2012-13 season. For her performance with Pesaro she was selected as team captain of the foreigners team in the Italian League 2013 All-Star Game.

Signed as the experienced player, she played the 2013–14 Turkish League season with Bursa BBSK. She also played with that team the 2013–14 CEV Cup Main Phase, but her team lost in the first round to the compatriot Fenerbahçe, being downgraded to the Challenge Cup third round. Her team then faced the French club ES Le Cannet, who defeated them in a golden set decision.

=== 2014 ===
Her team lost 1-2 to Galatasaray Daikin in the Turkish league quarterfinals to end up the Bursa BBSK season. After the season she took part in the 2014 Bursa athletes celebrations, as part of the volleyball women's team.

In September 2014, Moreno returned as head coach of the junior Italian club Fortitudo Città di Rieti from the B1 national league for the 2014-15 season. She was training the team waiting to sign an international contract. She was inducted on October 3, with the 2001 Columbia College volleyball team that won the NAIA National Championship to the Columbia College Athletic Hall of Fame and later a special guest during the third edition of the Rieti Sport Gala, were members of the city's volleyball club trained by her were among the nominees.

=== 2015 ===
In February 2015, after helping the Chinese club Guangdong Volleyball in the relegation playoff, she was added to the 12 women's roster with the Italian club Pomì Casalmaggiore under test, but did not make the team. She was in charge of the club when the head coach resigned and Moreno was provisionally appointed in charge of the club until the arrival of Daniela Monteriu and later Ferruccio Nocelli. Beside of all those changes, Rieti suffered the relegation to the B2 national league.

=== 2016 ===
Moreno set a new Pan-American Cup tournament record scoring 174 points in the 2016 edition, breaking the 151 points previous record set by Áurea Cruz. Apart from winning the Best Scorer award, she helped her national team to earn the tournament's seventh place. She signed with the Italian professional club Savino Del Bene Scandicci for the 2016/17 season. In December, Moreno and Savino Del Bene friendly agreed to end the contract between them.

== Clubs ==
- (Colombia) Orgullo Paisa-Lotto Lottín (1998)
- (Brazil) Leites Nestlé (1998)
- (Brazil) Recreativa de Ribeirão Preto (1998–1999)
- (Argentina) La Bancaria de Catamarca (1999-2001)
- (Italy) Sartori Mercedes Padova (2002–2003)
- (Italy) Icot Tec Europa Systems Forlì (2003–2004)
- (Italy) Infotel Europa Systems Forlì (2004–2005)
- (Italy) Tecnomec Europa Systems Forlì (2005–2006)
- (Japan) JT Marvelous (2006–2008)
- (Italy) Acqua&Sapone Città di Aprilia (2008–2009)
- (South Korea) Hyundai-Hillstate (2009–2011)
- (Italy) Parma Volley Girls (2011–2012)
- (Azerbaijan) Igtisadchi Baku (2012)
- (Italy) Robursport Volley Pesaro (2012–2013)
- (Turkey) Bursa BBSK (2013–2014)
- (China) Guangdong Volleyball (2015)
- (Italy) Omia Volley 88 Cisterna (2015–2016)
- (Italy) Savino Del Bene Scandicci (2016)

== Awards ==
=== Individuals ===
- 1998-99 Brazilian League "All-Star"
- 2004-05 Italian League "All-Star"
- 2006-07 Japan V-Premier League "Best Scorer"
- 2006-07 Japan V-Premier League "Best 6"
- 2007 - 56ª Kurowashiki All-Japan Volleyball Tournament "Best 6"
- 2008 - 57ª Kurowashiki All-Japan Volleyball Tournament "Best 6"
- 2008-09 A2 Italian League "Best Scorer"
- 2009-10 South Korean V-League Regular Season "Most Valuable Player"
- 2012-13 Italian League "All-Star"
- 2016 Pan-American Cup "Best Scorer"

==== College ====
- 2001 - Week 8 AMC Player of the Week
- 2001 NAIA Volleyball All-America Teams - First Team
- 2001 NAIA National Tournament MVP
- 2001 All-AMC First Team
- 2001 AMC Player of the Year
- 2001 AMC Freshman of the Year

=== Clubs ===
- 1998 Colombian League - Champion, with Antioquia
- 2000-01 Argentine League - Runner-Up, with La Bancaria Catamarca
- 2007 Kurowashiki All Japan Volleyball Championship - Runner-Up, with JT Marvelous
- 2006-07 Japanese V.Premier League - Runner-Up, with JT Marvelous
- 2009-10 South Korean V-League - Runner-Up, with Hyundai-Hillstate
- 2010-11 South Korean V-League - Champion, with Hyundai-Hillstate
