= Thijs ter Horst =

Dutch volleyball player (born 1991)

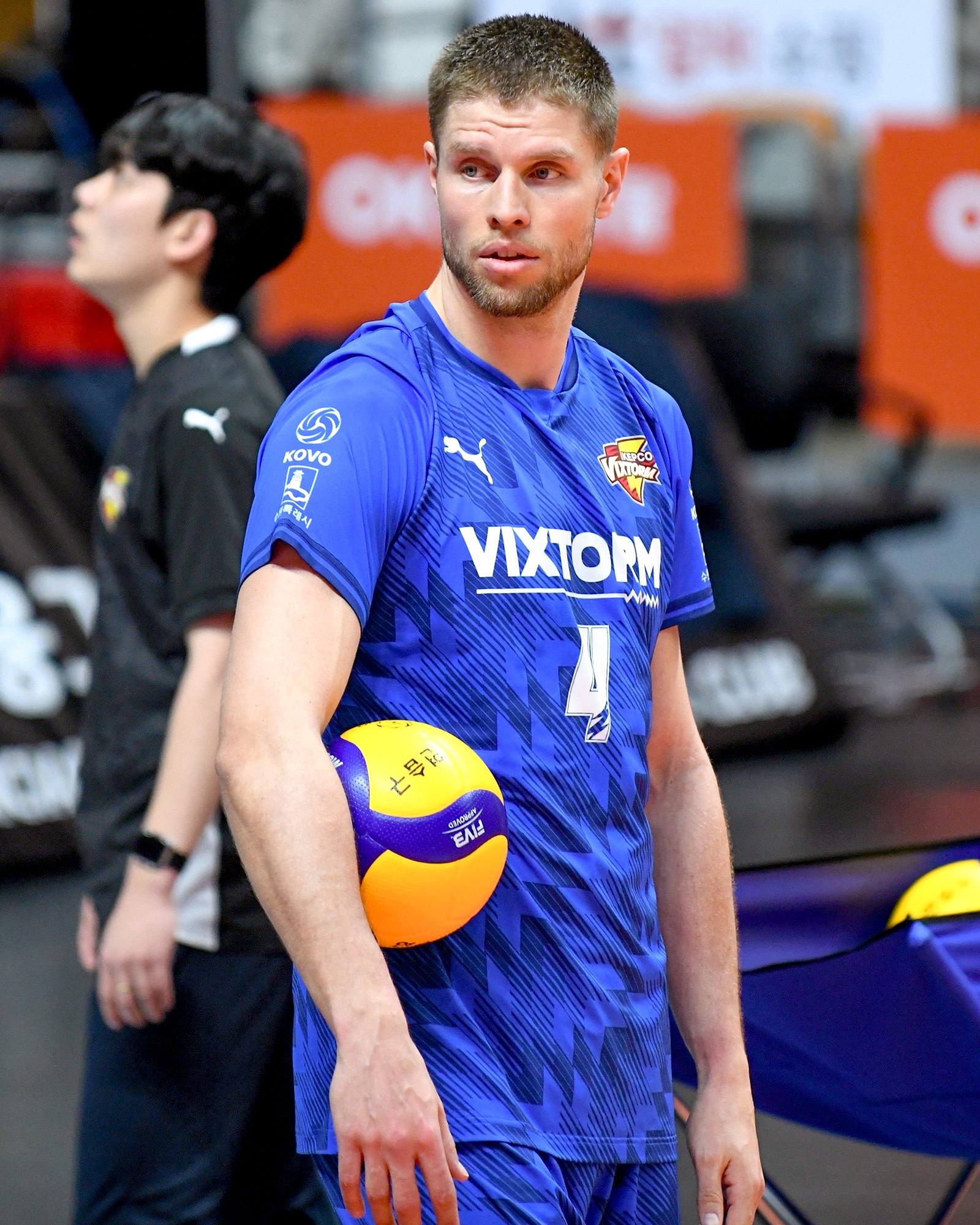
- Ter Horst in 2024

Personal information
- Born: 18 September 1991 (age 35) Almelo, Netherlands
- Height: 2.04 m (6 ft 8 in)
- Weight: 94 kg (207 lb)
- Spike: 364 cm (143 in)
- Block: 344 cm (135 in)

Volleyball information
- Position: Outside hitter
- Current club: Suwon KEPCO Vixtorm
- Number: 4

Career
- Years: Team
- 2010–2011 2011–2014 2014–2016 2016–2019 2019–2020 2020–2022 2022–: Orion Doetinchem; Verona Volley; Volley Piacenza; Samsung Bluefangs; Consar Ravenna; Sir Safety Perugia; Suwon KEPCO Vixtorm

National team
- Years: Team
- 2011–: Netherlands
Honours
Men's volleyball
Representing Netherlands
European League
Gold medal – first place	2012 Turkey
Bronze medal – third place	2019 Estonia

Thijs ter Horst (born 18 September 1991) is a Dutch professional volleyball player who plays as an outside hitter for Suwon KEPCO Vixtorm and the Netherlands national team.

Thijs ter Horst was born and raised in the eastern part of the Netherlands, where he started playing volleyball in 1998 in Flash Nijverdal.

== Honours ==
=== Club ===
- Domestic
  - 2010–11 Dutch SuperCup, with Orion Doetinchem
  - 2018–19 KOVO Cup, with Samsung Bluefangs
  - 2020–21 Italian SuperCup, with Sir Safety Perugia
  - 2021–22 Italian Cup, with Sir Safety Perugia
