= Jung Ji-seok =

South Korean volleyball player (born 1995)

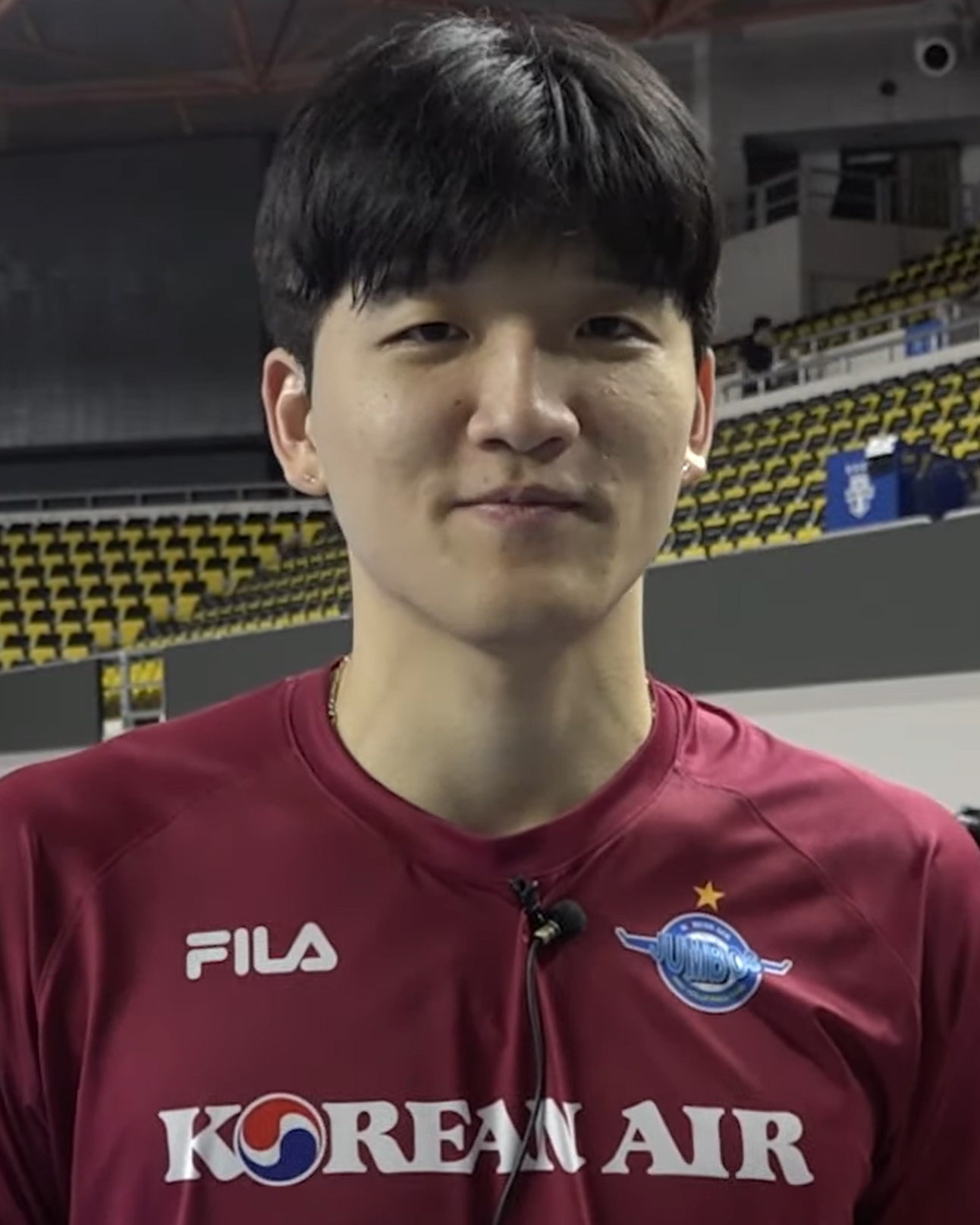
- Jung in 2020

Personal information
- Nationality: South Korean
- Born: 10 March 1995 (age 31); Bucheon, South Korea
- Height: 194 cm (6 ft 4 in)
- Weight: 87 kg (192 lb)
- Spike: 310 cm (10 ft 2 in)
- Block: 300 cm (9 ft 10 in)

Volleyball information
- Position: Outside hitter
- Current club: Incheon Korean Air Jumbos
- Number: 10

Career
Years	Teams
2013–	Korean Air Jumbos

National team
2016–	South Korea
Honours
Asian Games
Silver medal – second place	2018 Jakarta
Asian Championship
Bronze medal – third place	2017 Gresik
Asian U23 Championship
Silver medal – second place	2015 Naypyidaw
- Last updated: 7 February 2018

Jung Ji-seok (Korean: 정지석; born 10 March 1995 in Bucheon, Gyeonggi Province) is a South Korean male volleyball player. He currently plays for the Incheon Korean Air Jumbos in the V-League.

== Personal life ==
On 2 September 2021, Jung Jiseok's ex-girlfriend Mrs A filed a complaint against Jung Jiseok on charges of assault and illegal filming.

He was investigated by Gyeonggi Suwon Nambu Police station. However he denied all the allegations. According to the police Jung Jiseok said he forgot the password to his own phone which means they cannot undergo further investigations and confirm whether he assaulted and did illegal filming of his ex-girlfriend.

Later, the prosecution decided to suspend the charges against Jung Jiseok after the complainant submitted an agreement and a letter of withdrawal.

He later made a comeback to the court as soon as they signed the agreement.

== Career ==
=== Clubs ===
Jung had a successful high school volleyball career at Songlim High School in Seongnam, where he was recognized as the top high school spiker in the country. He declared for the V-League draft upon graduation and was selected by the Korean Air Jumbos with the sixth pick of the second round (13th overall) in the 2013 V-League Draft, which made him become the first player to go pro directly out of high school.

=== National team ===
In 2015, at 20, Jung was selected for the South Korean collegiate national team to participate in the 2015 Asian U23 Championship, the 2015 FIVB U23 World Championship and the 2015 Summer Universiade.

In 2016 Jung first joined the South Korean senior national team to compete at the 2016 FIVB World League, where South Korea finished in 23rd place.

Jung also took part in the 2017 Asian Championship, where he helped his team to win the bronze medal.

== Individual awards ==
=== National team ===
- 2015 Asian U23 Championship – Best opposite spiker
