= Jeon Kwang-in =

South Korean volleyball player (born 1991)

Jeon Kwang-In
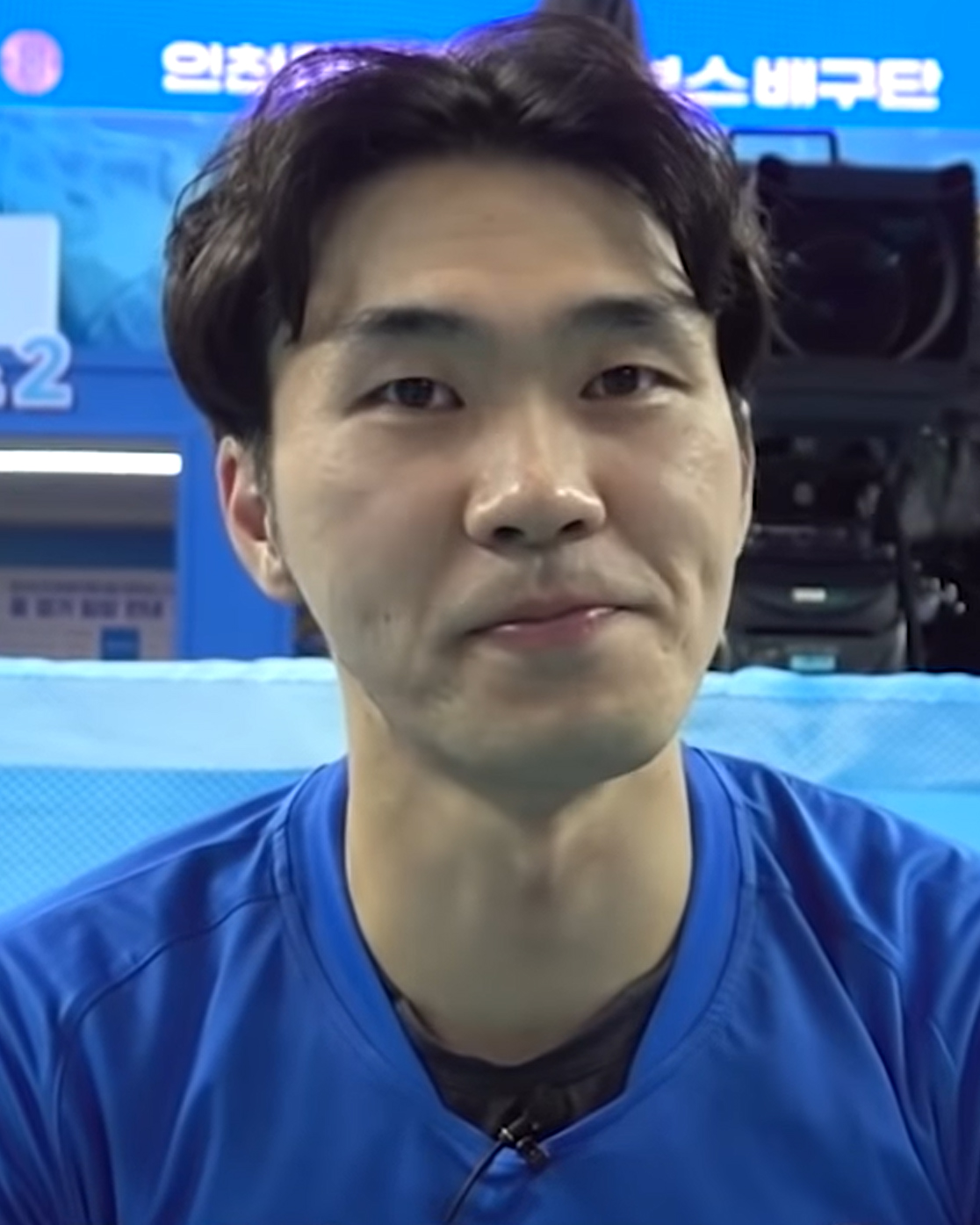
- Jeon in 2019

Personal information
- Nationality: South Korean
- Born: 18 September 1991 (age 35) hadong, South Gyeongsang Province
- Height: 1.94 m (6 ft 4 in)
- Weight: 82 kg (181 lb)
- Spike: 310 cm (122 in)
- Block: 300 cm (118 in)
- Education: Sungkyunkwan University

Volleyball information
- Position: Outside hitter
- Current club: Hyundai Capital Skywalkers
- Number: 12

Career
Years	Teams
2013-2018; 2018-	(South Korea) KEPCO Vixtorm (South Korea) Hyundai Capital Skywalkers

National team
2011-	South Korea
Honours
Men's volleyball
Representing South Korea
Asian Games
Silver medal – second place	2018 Jakarta-Palembang	Team
Bronze medal – third place	2014 Incheon	Team
Asian Championship
Silver medal – second place	2013 Dubai
Bronze medal – third place	2011 Tehran
Bronze medal – third place	2017 Gresik
Asian Cup
Gold medal – first place	2014 Almaty

Jeon Kwang-In (Korean: 전광인; born 18 September 1991 in Hadong, Gyeongsangnam-do) is a South Korean male volleyball player. He was part of the South Korea men's national volleyball team at the 2014 FIVB Volleyball Men's World Championship in Poland. He played for KEPCO Vixtorm.

== Clubs ==
- KEPCO Vixtorm (2013-2018)
- Cheonan Hyundai Capital Skywalkers (2018-)
