= 2006–07 V-League (South Korea) =

South Korean volleyball league

- League: V-League
- Sport: Volleyball
- Duration: 23 December 2006 – 31 March 2007
- Games: 163
- Teams: M: 6 W: 6
- Total attendance: 227,954

Regular season (Men's)
- Top seed: Daejeon Samsung Bluefangs
- Top scorer: (Brazil) Leandro Araújo da Silva (Daejeon Samsung Bluefangs)

Regular season (Women's)
- Top seed: Cheonan Heungkuk Pink Spiders
- Top scorer: (United States) Rachel van Meter (Gumi Korea Expressway Hi-pass)

Championship
- Champions: M: Cheonan Hyundai Skywalkers; W: Cheonan Heungkuk Pink Spiders
- Runners-up: M: Daejeon Samsung Bluefangs; W: Suwon Hyundai Hillstate
- Finals MVP: M: (United States) Sean Rooney (Cheonan Hyundai Skywalkers; W: (South Korea) Kim Yeon-koung (Cheonan Heungkuk Pink Spiders)

V-League seasons
- ← 2005–06 2007–08 →

The 2006–07 V-League season was the 3rd season of the V-League, the highest professional volleyball league in South Korea. The season started on 23 December 2006 and finished on 31 March 2007.

Cheonan Hyundai Capital Skywalkers were the defending champions in the men's league and Cheonan Heungkuk Pink Spiders the defending female champions.

== Teams ==
=== Men's clubs ===
Location of teams in V-League Men's Clubs

| Team | Location | Stadium | Capacity |
|---|---|---|---|
| Cheonan Hyundai Capital Skywalkers | Cheonan | Yu Gwan-sun Gymnasium | 5,482 |
| Daejeon Samsung Bluefangs | Daejeon | Chungmu Gymnasium | 5,000 |
| Gumi LIG Greaters | Gumi | Park Jeong-hee Gymnasium | 6,277 |
| Incheon Korean Air Jumbos | Incheon | Dowon Gymnasium | 5,000 Incheon Korean Air Jumbos |
| Sangmu Volleyball Team | *All games played away from home | | |
| Suwon KEPCO Vixtorm | Suwon | Suwon Gymnasium | 4,317 |

=== Women's clubs ===
Location of teams in V-League Women's Clubs

| Team | Location | Stadium | Capacity |
|---|---|---|---|
| Daejeon KT&G | Daejeon | Chungmu Gymnasium | 5,000 |
| Gumi Korea Expressway Hi-pass | Gumi | Park Jeong-hee Gymnasium | 6,277 |
| Incheon GS Caltex KIXX | Incheon | Dowon Gymnasium | 5,000 Incheon Korean Air Jumbos |
| Cheonan Heungkuk Pink Spiders | Cheonan | Yu Gwan-sun Gymnasium | 5,482 |
| Suwon Hyundai Hillstate | Suwon | Suwon Gymnasium | 4,317 |

== Regular season ==
=== League table (Men's) ===
| Pos | Team | Pld | W | L | Pts | SR | SPR | Qualification |
|---|---|---|---|---|---|---|---|---|
| 1 | Daejeon Samsung Bluefangs | 30 | 25 | 5 | 25 | 3.037 | 1.148 | Championship |
| 2 | Cheonan Hyundai Skywalkers | 30 | 24 | 6 | 24 | 2.516 | 1.154 | Playoff |
| 3 | Incheon Korean Air Jumbos | 30 | 19 | 11 | 19 | 1.417 | 1.028 | Playoff |
| 4 | Gumi LIG Greaters | 30 | 14 | 16 | 14 | 0.981 | 1.028 | |
| 5 | Suwon KEPCO Vixtorm | 30 | 6 | 24 | 16 | 0.342 | 0.865 | |
| 6 | Sangmu Volleyball Team | 30 | 2 | 28 | 2 | 0.165 | 0.796 | |

=== League table (Women's) ===
| Pos | Team | Pld | W | L | Pts | SR | SPR | Qualification |
|---|---|---|---|---|---|---|---|---|
| 1 | Cheonan Heungkuk Pink Spiders | 24 | 20 | 4 | 20 | 2.276 | 1.132 | Championship |
| 2 | Gumi Korea Expressway Hi-pass | 24 | 16 | 8 | 16 | 1.436 | 1.053 | Playoff |
| 3 | Suwon Hyundai Hillstate | 24 | 13 | 11 | 13 | 1.156 | 1.028 | Playoff |
| 4 | Incheon GS Caltex KIXX | 24 | 8 | 16 | 8 | 0.679 | 0.939 | |
| 5 | Daejeon KT&G | 24 | 3 | 21 | 3 | 0.343 | 0.863 | |

== Final stage ==
=== Bracket (Men's) ===
Playoff
2 | Cheonan Hyundai Skywalkers | 3 | 3
3 | Incheon Korean Air Jumbos | 1 | 2

Championship
1 | Daejeon Samsung Bluefangs | 1 | 0 | 2
2 | Cheonan Hyundai Skywalkers | 3 | 3 | 3

=== Bracket (Women's) ===
Playoff
2 | Gumi Korea Expressway Hi-pass | 0 | 1
3 | Suwon Hyundai Hillstate | 3 | 3

Championship
1 | Cheonan Heungkuk Pink Spiders | 1 | 3 | 3 | 3
2 | Suwon Hyundai Hillstate | 3 | 0 | 1 | 2

== Top Scorers ==
=== Men's ===
| Rank | Player | Club | Points |
|---|---|---|---|
| 1 | (Brazil) Leandro da Silva | Daejeon Samsung Bluefangs | 717 |
| 2 | (Brazil) "Bobi" | Incheon Korean Air Jumbos | 674 |
| 3 | (Canada) Fred Winters | Gumi LIG Greaters | 549 |
| 4 | (United States) Sean Rooney | Cheonan Hyundai Capital Skywalkers | 518 |
| 5 | (South Korea) Lee Kyeong-su | Gumi LIG Greaters | 436 |
| 6 | (South Korea) Shin Yeong-su | Incheon Korean Air Jumbos | 379 |
| 7 | (South Korea) Jeong Pyeong-ho | Suwon KEPCO Vixtorm | 355 |
| 8 | (South Korea) Song In-seok | Cheonan Hyundai Skywalkers | 338 |
| 9 | (South Korea) Yang Seong-man | Suwon KEPCO Vixtorm | 310 |
| 10 | (South Korea) Kang Seong-min | Suwon KEPCO Vixtorm | 306 |

=== Women's ===
| Rank | Player | Club | Points |
|---|---|---|---|
| 1 | (United States) Rachel van Meter | Gumi Korea Expressway Hi-pass | 666 |
| 2 | (South Korea) Kim Yeon-koung | Cheonan Heungkuk Pink Spiders | 562 |
| 3 | (South Korea) Jung Dae-young | Suwon Hyundai Hillstate | 515 |
| 4 | (United States) Katie Wilkins | Cheonan Heungkuk Pink Spiders | 457 |
| 5 | (Brazil) "Andrea" | Incheon GS Caltex KIXX | 424 |
| 6 | (South Korea) Kim Min-ji | Incheon GS Caltex KIXX | 422 |
| 7 | (South Korea) Hwang Youn-joo | Cheonan Heungkuk Pink Spiders | 402 |
| 8 | (South Korea) Han Yoo-mi | Suwon Hyundai Hillstate | 335 |
| 9 | (South Korea) Sanja Tomasević | Suwon Hyundai Hillstate | 318 |
| 10 | (South Korea) Han Song-yi | Gumi Korea Expressway Hi-pass | 268 |

== Player of the Round ==
=== Men's ===
| Round | Player | Club |
|---|---|---|
| January | (Brazil) Bobi | Incheon Korean Air Jumbos |
| February | (South Korea) - | Incheon Korean Air Jumbos |
| March | (South Korea) Park Chul-woo | Cheonan Hyundai Capital Skywalkers |

=== Women's ===
| Round | Player | Club |
|---|---|---|
| January | (South Korea) Kim Yeon-koung | Cheonan Heungkuk Pink Spiders |
| February | (United States) Katie Wilkins | Cheonan Heungkuk Pink Spiders |
| March | (United States) Rachel van Meter | Gumi Korea Expressway Hi-pass |

== Final standing ==
=== Men's League ===
| Rank | Team |
|---|---|
| 1st place, gold medalist(s) | Cheonan Hyundai Skywalkers |
| 2nd place, silver medalist(s) | Daejeon Samsung Bluefangs |
| 3rd place, bronze medalist(s) | Incheon Korean Air Jumbos |
| 4 | Gumi LIG Greaters |
| 5 | Suwon KEPCO Vixtorm |
| 6 | Sangmu Volleyball Team |

=== Women's League ===
| Rank | Team |
|---|---|
| 1st place, gold medalist(s) | Cheonan Heungkuk Pink Spiders |
| 2nd place, silver medalist(s) | Suwon Hyundai Hillstate |
| 3rd place, bronze medalist(s) | Gumi Korea Expressway Hi-pass Daejeon KT&G |
| 4 | Incheon GS Caltex KIXX |
| 5 | Daejeon KT&G |
