= 2005 V-League (South Korea) =

South Korean volleyball league

- League: V-League
- Sport: Volleyball
- Duration: 20 February 2005 – 8 May 2005
- Games: 112
- Teams: M: 6 W: 5
- Total attendance: 101,436

Regular season (Men's)
- Top seed: Hyundai Capital Skywalkers
- Top scorer: (South Korea) Lee Gyeong-su (Gumi LIG Greaters)

Regular season (Women's)
- Top seed: Korea Expressway Hi-pass
- Top scorer: (South Korea) Jung Dae-young (Hyundai Hillstate)

Finals
- Champions: M: Samsung Bluefangs; W: KT&G
- Runners-up: M: Gumi LIG Greaters; W: Hyundai Hillstate
- Finals MVP: M: (South Korea) Kim Se-jin (Samsung Bluefangs); W: (South Korea) Choi Kwang-hee (KT&G)

V-League seasons
- 2005–06 →

The 2005 V-League was the inaugural season of the V-League, the highest professional volleyball league in South Korea. The season began on 20 February 2005 to 8 May 2005. Games were played at venues in Daejeon, Incheon, Cheonan and Gumi.

The inaugural season champions are Samsung Bluefangs for men's while KT&G for women's.

== Teams ==
=== Men's clubs ===
Location of teams in V-League Men's Clubs

Team	Location	Stadium	Capacity
Hyundai Capital Skywalkers	Cheonan	Yu Gwan-sun Gymnasium	5,482
Samsung Bluefangs	Daejeon	Chungmu Gymnasium	5,000
Gumi LIG Greaters	Gumi	Park Jeong-hee Gymnasium	6,277
Korean Air Jumbos	Incheon	Dowon Gymnasium	5,000 Incheon Korean Air Jumbos
Sangmu Volleyball Team	–	–	
KEPCO Vixtorm	–	–	–

=== Women's clubs ===
Location of teams in V-League Women's Clubs

Team	Location	Stadium	Capacity
KT&G	Daejeon	Chungmu Gymnasium	5,000
Korea Expressway Hi-pass	Gumi	Park Jeong-hee Gymnasium	6,277
GS Caltex KIXX	Incheon	Dowon Gymnasium	5,000 Incheon Korean Air Jumbos
Heungkuk Pink Spiders	Cheonan	Yu Gwan-sun Gymnasium	5,482
Hyundai Hillstate	–	–	–

== Regular season ==
=== League table (Male) ===
Pos	Team	Pld	W	L	Pts	SR	SPR	Qualification
1	Hyundai Capital Skywalkers	20	18	2	38	3.667	1.173	Championship
2	Samsung Bluefangs	20	18	2	38	3.625	1.171	Playoff
3	Gumi LIG Greaters	20	9	11	29	1.000	1.018	Playoff
4	Korean Air Jumbos	20	6	14	26	0.551	0.908	
5	KEPCO Vixtorm	20	6	14	26	0.542	0.926	
6	Sangmu Volleyball Team	20	3	17	23	0.309	0.855	

=== League table (Female) ===
Pos	Team	Pld	W	L	Pts	SR	SPR	Qualification
1	Korea Expressway Hi-pass	16	12	4	28	2.668	1.208	Championship
2	KT&G	16	11	5	27	1.727	1.145	Playoff
3	Hyundai Hillstate	16	10	6	26	1.032	0.994	Playoff
4	GS Caltex KIXX	16	4	12	20	0.500	0.884	
5	Heungkuk Pink Spiders	16	3	13	19	0.429	0.830	

== Final stage ==
=== Bracket (Male) ===
Playoff
2	Samsung Bluefangs	3	3
3	LIG Greaters	0	0

Championship
1	Hyundai Capital Skywalkers	1	3	0	1
2	Samsung Bluefangs	3	0	3	3

=== Bracket (Female) ===
Playoff
2	KT&G	3
3	Hyundai Hillstate	0	1

Championship
1	Korea Expressway Hi-pass	3	1	2	0
2	KT&G	1	3	3	3

== Top Scorers ==
=== Men's ===
Rank	Player	Club	Points
1	(South Korea) Lee Kyeong-su	Gumi LIG Greaters	521
2	(South Korea) Jeong Pyeong-ho	KEPCO Vixtorm	342
3	(South Korea) Kim Seong-chae	Gumi LIG Greaters	271
4	(South Korea) Kang Woong-jin	Korean Air Jumbos	246
4	(South Korea) Yun Gwan-yeol	Korean Air Jumbos	246
6	(South Korea) Lee Hyeong-du	Samsung Bluefangs	244
7	(South Korea) Hu In-jeong	Hyundai Capital Skywalkers	240
8	(South Korea) Song In-seok	Hyundai Capital Skywalkers	239
9	(South Korea) Shim Yeon-seop	KEPCO Vixtorm	230
10	(South Korea) Park Seok-yun	Gumi LIG Greaters	217

=== Women's ===
Rank	Player	Club	Points
1	(South Korea) Jung Dae-young	Hyundai Hillstate	319
2	(South Korea) Yun Su-hyeon	Heungkuk Pink Spiders	272
3	(South Korea) Choi Kwang-hee	KT&G	266
4	(South Korea) Kim Min-ji	GS Caltex KIXX	256
5	(South Korea) Han Song-yi	Korea Expressway Hi-pass	241
5	(South Korea) Han Yoo-mi	Hyundai Hillstate	241
7	(South Korea) Hwang Youn-joo	Heungkuk Pink Spiders	230
8	(South Korea) Lim Hyo-sook	KT&G	214
9	(South Korea) Park Mee-kyung	Korea Expressway Hi-pass	210
10	(South Korea) Park Kyeong-nang	KT&G	204

== Player of the Round ==
=== Men's ===
Round	Player	Club
March	(South Korea) Lee Gyeong-su	Gumi LIG Greaters
April	(South Korea) Hu In-jeong	Hyundai Capital Skywalkers

=== Women's ===
Round	Player	Club
March	(South Korea) Kim Min-ji	GS Caltex KIXX
April	(South Korea) Jung Dae-young	Hyundai Hillstate

== Final standing ==
=== Men's League ===
Rank	Team
1st place, gold medalist(s)	Samsung Bluefangs
2nd place, silver medalist(s)	Hyundai Capital Skywalkers
3rd place, bronze medalist(s)	Gumi LIG Greaters
4	Korean Air Jumbos
5	KEPCO Vixtorm
6	Sangmu Volleyball Team

=== Women's League ===
Rank	Team
1st place, gold medalist(s)	KT&G
2nd place, silver medalist(s)	Korea Expressway Hi-pass
3rd place, bronze medalist(s)	Hyundai Hillstate
4	GS Caltex KIXX
5	Heungkuk Pink Spiders

== Awards ==
=== Statistics leaders ===
==== Men's ====
- Best scorer

(South Korea) Lee Gyeong-su (LIG Greaters) – 521 points

- Best spiker

(South Korea) Hu In-jeong (Hyundai Capital) – 53.99% success rate

- Best blocker

(South Korea) Lee Sun-kyu (Hyundai Capital) – 0.93 blocks/set

- Best server

(South Korea) Lee Gyeong-su (LIG Greaters) – 0.27 serves/set

- Best setter

(South Korea) Kwon Young-min (Hyundai Capital) – 8.66 sets/set

- Best defender

(South Korea) Lee Young-su (Sangmu) – 6.19% success rate

- Best libero

(South Korea) Yeo Oh-hyun (Samsung Fire) – 6.51% success rate

==== Women's ====
- Best scorer

(South Korea) Jung Dae-young (Hyundai Hillstate) – 319 points

- Best spiker

(South Korea) Kim Se-young (KT&G) – 39.04% success rate

- Best Back Attacker

(South Korea) Hwang Youn-joo (Heungkuk Life) – 100 score

- Best blocker

(South Korea) Jung Dae-young (Hyundai Hillstate) – 0.76 blocks/set

- Best server

(South Korea) Hwang Youn-joo (Heungkuk Life) – 0.31 aces/set

- Best setter

(South Korea) Kim Sa-nee (Korea Expressway) – 8.36 sets/set

- Best defender

(South Korea) Jung Dae-young (Hyundai Hillstate) – 4.09% success rate

- Best libero

(South Korea) Nam Jie-youn (GS Caltex KIXX) – 6.38% success rate

=== Non-recorded ===
==== Men's ====
- Regular Round – Most Valuable Player

(South Korea) Hu In-jeong (Hyundai Capital)

- Final Stage – Most Valuable Player

(South Korea) Kim Se-jin (Samsung Fire)

- Popularity Award

(South Korea) Lee Gyeong-su (LIG Greaters

- Fair play award

(South Korea) Lee Ho-nam (Korean Air)

- Best Rookie Award

(South Korea) Ha Hyun-yong (LIG Greaters)

==== Women's ====
- Regular Round – Most Valuable Player

(South Korea) Jung Dae-young (Hyundai Hillstate)

- Final Stage – Most Valuable Player

(South Korea) Choi Kwang-hee (KT&G)

- Popularity Award

(South Korea) Choi Kwang-hee (KT&G)

- Skill Development Award

(South Korea) Kim Min-ji (GS Caltex KIXX)

- Fair play award

(South Korea) Lim Hyo-sook (KT&G)

- Best Rookie Award

(South Korea) Hwang Youn-joo (Heungkuk Life)
