= 2007–08 V-League (South Korea) =

Volleyball league season

V League
- Season: 2007–08
- Dates: 1 December 2007 – 17 April 2008

The 2007-08 V-League season was the 4th season of the V-League, the highest professional volleyball league in South Korea. The season started on 1 December 2007 and finished on 17 April 2008. Cheonan Hyundai Capital Skywalkers were the defending champions in the men's league and Cheonan Heungkuk Pink Spiders the defending female champions.

== Teams ==
=== Men's clubs ===
Location of teams in V-League Men's Clubs

Team	Location	Stadium	Capacity
Cheonan Hyundai Capital Skywalkers	Cheonan	Yu Gwan-sun Gymnasium	5,482
Daejeon Samsung Bluefangs	Daejeon	Chungmu Gymnasium	5,000
Gumi LIG Greaters	Gumi	Park Jeong-hee Gymnasium	6,277
Incheon Korean Air Jumbos	Incheon	Dowon Gymnasium	5,000 Incheon Korean Air Jumbos
Sangmu Volleyball Team	*All games played away from home		
Suwon KEPCO Vixtorm	Suwon	Suwon Gymnasium	4,317

=== Women's clubs ===
Location of teams in V-League Women's Clubs

Team	Location	Stadium	Capacity
Daejeon KT&G	Daejeon	Chungmu Gymnasium	5,000
Gumi Korea Expressway Hi-pass	Gumi	Park Jeong-hee Gymnasium	6,277
Incheon GS Caltex KIXX	Incheon	Dowon Gymnasium	5,000 Incheon Korean Air Jumbos
Cheonan Heungkuk Pink Spiders	Cheonan	Yu Gwan-sun Gymnasium	5,482
Suwon Hyundai Hillstate	Suwon	Suwon Gymnasium	4,317

== Regular season ==
=== League table (Male) ===
Pos	Team	Pld	W	L	Pts	SR	SPR	Qualification
1	Daejeon Samsung Bluefangs	35	29	6	0.829	2.514	1.127	Finals
2	Incheon Korean Air Jumbos	35	27	8	0.771	2.000	1.092	Semifinals
3	Cheonan Hyundai Skywalkers	35	24	11	0.686	1.787	1.075	Semifinals
4	Gumi LIG Greaters	35	15	20	0.429	0.786	0.986	
5	Sangmu Volleyball Team	35	6	29	0.171	0.467	0.905	
6	Suwon KEPCO Vixtorm	35	4	31	0.114	0.260	0.842	

=== League table (Female) ===
Pos	Team	Pld	W	L	Pts	SR	SPR	Qualification
1	Cheonan Heungkuk Pink Spiders	28	24	4	0.857	2.419	1.116	Finals
2	Daejeon KT&G	28	17	11	0.607	1.234	1.032	Semifinals
3	Incheon GS Caltex KIXX	28	14	14	0.500	1.075	1.003	Semifinals
4	Gumi Korea Expressway Hi-pass	28	11	17	0.393	0.766	0.971	
5	Suwon Hyundai Hillstate	28	4	24	0.143	0.429	0.897	

== Play-offs ==
=== Bracket (Male) ===
Semifinals
1	Daejeon Samsung Bluefangs
2	Incheon Korean Air Jumbos	3	1	1
3	Cheonan Hyundai Skywalkers	0	3	3

Finals
1	Daejeon Samsung Bluefangs	3	3	3
2	Cheonan Hyundai Skywalkers	1	1	1

=== Bracket (Female) ===
Semifinals
1	Cheonan Heungkuk Pink Spiders
2	Daejeon KT&G	2	0
3	Incheon GS Caltex KIXX	3	3

Finals
1	Cheonan Heungkuk Pink Spiders	3	2	1	1
2	Incheon GS Caltex KIXX	1	3	3	3

== Top Scorers ==
=== Men's ===
Rank	Player	Club	Points
1	(Croatia) Andelko Ćuk	Daejeon Samsung Bluefangs	805
2	(Brazil) "Bobi"	Incheon Korean Air Jumbos	676
3	(South Korea) Lee Kyeong-su	Gumi LIG Greaters	500
4	(South Korea) Song In-seok	Cheonan Hyundai Skywalkers	462
4	(South Korea) Jang Kwang-kyun	Incheon Korean Air Jumbos	462
6	(South Korea) Jeong Pyeong-ho	Suwon KEPCO Vixtorm	440
7	(South Korea) Yang Seong-man	Suwon KEPCO Vixtorm	431
8	(Spain) Guillermo Falasca	Gumi LIG Greaters	427
9	(South Korea) Shin Yeong-su	Incheon Korean Air Jumbos	362
10	(South Korea) Hu In-jeong	Cheonan Hyundai Skywalkers	350

=== Women's ===
Rank	Player	Club	Points
1	(South Korea) Han Song-yi	Gumi Korea Expressway Hi-pass	692
2	(South Korea) Kim Yeon-koung	Cheonan Heungkuk Pink Spiders	649
3	(Canada) Tiffany Dodds	Suwon Hyundai Hillstate	488
4	(South Korea) Han Yoo-mi	Suwon Hyundai Hillstate	461
5	(Brazil) Fernanda Alves	Daejeon KT&G	459
6	(South Korea) Hwang Youn-joo	Cheonan Heungkuk Pink Spiders	454
7	(Brazil) Raquel Silva	Incheon GS Caltex KIXX	441
8	(South Korea) Kim Min-ji	Incheon GS Caltex KIXX	389
9	(South Korea) Lim Hyo-sook	Gumi Korea Expressway Hi-pass	370
10	(South Korea) Jung Dae-young	Incheon GS Caltex KIXX	368

== Player of the Round ==
=== Men's ===
Round	Player	Club
December	(Croatia) Andelko Ćuk	Daejeon Samsung Bluefangs
January	(South Korea) Jang Kwang-kyun	Incheon Korean Air Jumbos
February	(Croatia) Andelko Ćuk	Daejeon Samsung Bluefangs
March	(South Korea) Han Sun-soo	Incheon Korean Air Jumbos

=== Women's ===
Round	Player	Club
December	(South Korea) Han Song-yi	Gumi Korea Expressway Hi-pass
January	(South Korea) Kim Sa-nee	Daejeon KT&G
February	(United States) Rachel van Meter	Gumi Korea Expressway Hi-pass

== Final standing ==
=== Men's League ===
Rank	Team
1st place, gold medalist(s)	Daejeon Samsung Bluefangs
2nd place, silver medalist(s)	Cheonan Hyundai Skywalkers
3rd place, bronze medalist(s)	Incheon Korean Air Jumbos
4	Gumi LIG Greaters
5	Sangmu Volleyball Team
6	Suwon KEPCO Vixtorm

=== Women's League ===
Rank	Team
1st place, gold medalist(s)	Incheon GS Caltex KIXX
2nd place, silver medalist(s)	Cheonan Heungkuk Pink Spiders
3rd place, bronze medalist(s)	Daejeon KT&G
4	Gumi Korea Expressway Hi-pass
5	Suwon Hyundai Hillstate
