= 2005–06 V-League (South Korea) =

South Korean volleyball league

- League: V-League
- Sport: Volleyball
- Duration: 3 December 2005 – 2 April 2006
- Games: 191
- Teams: M: 6 W: 6
- Total attendance: 159,716

Regular season (Men's)
- Top seed: Hyundai Capital Skywalkers
- Top scorer: Lee Kyeong-su (Gumi LIG Greaters)

Regular season (Women's)
- Top seed: Cheonan Heungkuk Pink Spiders
- Top scorer: Kim Yeon-Koung (Cheonan Heungkuk Pink Spiders)

Finals
- Champions: M: Hyundai Capital Skywalkers; W: Cheonan Heungkuk Pink Spiders
- Runners-up: M: Daejeon Samsung Bluefangs; W: Gumi Korea Expressway Hi-pass
- Finals MVP: M: Kim Se-jin (Samsung Bluefangs); W: Choi Kwang-hee (KT&G)

V-League seasons
- ← 2005 2006–07 →

The 2005-6 V-League season was the second season of the V-League, the highest professional volleyball league in South Korea. The season began on 3 December 2005 and finished on 2 April 2006.

Hyundai Capital Skywalkers were the new champions in the men's league and Cheonan Heungkuk Pink Spiders were the new champions in women's league.

== Teams ==
=== Men's clubs ===
Location of teams in V-League Men's Clubs

Team	Location	Stadium	Capacity
Cheonan Hyundai Capital Skywalkers	Cheonan	Yu Gwan-sun Gymnasium	5,482
Daejeon Samsung Bluefangs	Daejeon	Chungmu Gymnasium	5,000
Gumi LIG Greaters	Gumi	Park Jeong-hee Gymnasium	6,277
Incheon Korean Air Jumbos	Incheon	Dowon Gymnasium	5,000 Incheon Korean Air Jumbos
Sangmu Volleyball Team	Masan	Masan Gymnasium	5,000
Masan KEPCO Vixtorm	Masan	Masan Gymnasium	5,000

=== Women's clubs ===
Location of teams in V-League Women's Clubs

Team	Location	Stadium	Capacity
Daejeon KT&G	Daejeon	Chungmu Gymnasium	5,000
Gumi Korea Expressway Hi-pass	Gumi	Park Jeong-hee Gymnasium	5,711 Seongnam Sports Complex
Incheon GS Caltex KIXX	Incheon	Dowon Gymnasium	6,277
Cheonan Heungkuk Pink Spiders	Cheonan	Yu Gwan-sun Gymnasium	5,482
Masan Hyundai Hillstate	Masan	Masan Gymnasium	5,000

== Regular season ==
=== League table (Men's) ===
Pos	Team	Pld	W	L	Pts	SR	SPR	Qualification
1	Cheonan Hyundai Skywalkers	35	31	4	31	3.960	1.203	Championship
2	Daejeon Samsung Bluefangs	35	30	5	30	3.133	1.163	Playoff
3	Gumi LIG Greaters	35	16	19	16	0.939	0.991	Playoff
4	Incheon Korean Air Jumbos	35	15	20	15	0.786	0.967	
5	Sangmu Volleyball Team	35	10	25	10	0.442	0.862	
6	Masan KEPCO Vixtorm	35	3	32	3	0.297	0.878	

=== League table (Women's) ===
Pos	Team	Pld	W	L	Pts	SR	SPR	Qualification
1	Cheonan Heungkuk Pink Spiders	28	17	11	17	1.500	1.102	Championship
2	Gumi Korea Expressway Hi-pass	28	17	11	17	1.409	1.062	Playoff
3	Daejeon KT&G	28	16	12	16	0.932	0.980	Playoff
4	Masan Hyundai Hillstate	28	14	14	14	1.075	0.994	
5	Incheon GS Caltex KIXX	28	6	22	6	0.467	0.882	

== Final stage ==
=== Bracket (Men's) ===
Playoff
2	Daejeon Samsung Bluefangs	3	3
3	Gumi LIG Greaters	1	0

Championship
1	Cheonan Hyundai Skywalkers	2	3	3	1	3
2	Daejeon Samsung Bluefangs	3	0	0	3	0

=== Bracket (Women's) ===
Playoff
2	Gumi Korea Expressway Hi-pass	3	3
3	Daejeon KT&G	0	1

Championship
1	Cheonan Heungkuk Pink Spiders	1	3	0	3	3
2	Gumi Korea Expressway Hi-pass	3	1	3	0	1

== Top Scorers ==
=== Men's ===
Rank	Player	Club	Points
1	(South Korea) Lee Kyeong-su	Gumi LIG Greaters	652
2	(South Korea) Jeong Pyeong-ho	Masan KEPCO Vixtorm	453
3	(South Korea) Jang Gwang-kyun	Sangmu Volleyball Team	440
4	(United States) Sean Rooney	Cheonan Hyundai Capital Skywalkers	437
5	(South Korea) Kang Dong-jin	Incheon Korean Air Jumbos	431
6	(South Korea) Jang Byeong-cheol	Daejeon Samsung Bluefangs	413
7	(South Korea) Hu In-jeong	Cheonan Hyundai Skywalkers	353
8	(South Korea) Song In-seok	Cheonan Hyundai Skywalkers	327
9	(South Korea) Shin Yeong-su	Incheon Korean Air Jumbos	323
10	(Brazil) Gilmar Teixeira	Gumi LIG Greaters	316

=== Women's ===
Rank	Player	Club	Points
1	(South Korea) Kim Yeon-koung	Cheonan Heungkuk Pink Spiders	756
2	(South Korea) Jung Dae-young	Masan Hyundai Hillstate	873
3	(South Korea) Kim Min-ji	Incheon GS Caltex KIXX	618
4	(South Korea) Hwang Youn-joo	Cheonan Heungkuk Pink Spiders	532
5	(South Korea) Lee Jung-ok	Incheon GS Caltex KIXX	494
6	(South Korea) Lim Yu-jin	Gumi Korea Expressway Hi-pass	483
7	(South Korea) Kim Se-young	Daejeon KT&G	482
8	(South Korea) Han Song-yi	Gumi Korea Expressway Hi-pass	408
9	(South Korea) Han Yoo-mi	Masan Hyundai Hillstate	374
10	(South Korea) Choi Kwang-hee	Daejeon KT&G	330

== Player of the Round ==
=== Men's ===
Round	Player	Club
December	(United States) Sean Rooney	Cheonan Hyundai Capital Skywalkers
January	(South Korea) Lee Kyeong-su	Gumi LIG Greaters
February	(South Korea) Jang Byeong-cheol	Daejeon Samsung Bluefangs

=== Women's ===
Round	Player	Club
December	(South Korea) Kim Yeon-koung	Cheonan Heungkuk Pink Spiders
January	(South Korea) Hwang Youn-joo	Cheonan Heungkuk Pink Spiders
February	(South Korea) Lim Yu-jin	Gumi Korea Expressway Hi-pass

== Final standing ==
=== Men's League ===
Rank	Team
1st place, gold medalist(s)	Cheonan Hyundai Skywalkers
2nd place, silver medalist(s)	Daejeon Samsung Bluefangs
3rd place, bronze medalist(s)	Gumi LIG Greaters
4	Incheon Korean Air Jumbos
5	Sangmu Volleyball Team
6	Masan KEPCO Vixtorm

=== Women's League ===
Rank	Team
1st place, gold medalist(s)	Cheonan Heungkuk Pink Spiders
2nd place, silver medalist(s)	Gumi Korea Expressway Hi-pass
3rd place, bronze medalist(s)	Daejeon KT&G
4	Masan Hyundai Hillstate
5	Incheon GS Caltex KIXX
