= 2008–09 V-League (South Korea) =

Pro volleyball

V League
- Season: 2008–09
- Dates: 22 November 2008 – 14 April 2009

The 2008-09 V-League season was the 5th season of the V-League, the highest professional volleyball league in South Korea. The season started on 22 November 2008 and finished on 14 April 2009. Cheonan Hyundai Capital Skywalkers were the defending champions in the men's league and Incheon GS Caltex KIXX were the defending female champions.

== Teams ==
=== Men's clubs ===
Location of teams in V-League Men's Clubs

Team	Location	Stadium	Capacity
Cheonan Hyundai Capital Skywalkers	Cheonan	Yu Gwan-sun Gymnasium	5,482
Daejeon Samsung Bluefangs	Daejeon	Chungmu Gymnasium	5,000
Gumi LIG Greaters	Gumi	Park Jeong-hee Gymnasium	6,277
Incheon Korean Air Jumbos	Incheon	Dowon Gymnasium	5,000 Incheon Korean Air Jumbos
Sangmu Volleyball Team	*All games played away from home		
Suwon KEPCO Vixtorm	Suwon	Suwon Gymnasium	4,317

=== Women's clubs ===
Location of teams in V-League Women's Clubs

Team	Location	Stadium	Capacity
Daejeon KT&G	Daejeon	Chungmu Gymnasium	5,000
Gumi Korea Expressway Hi-pass	Gumi	Park Jeong-hee Gymnasium	6,277
Incheon GS Caltex KIXX	Incheon	Dowon Gymnasium	5,000 Incheon Korean Air Jumbos
Cheonan Heungkuk Pink Spiders	Cheonan	Yu Gwan-sun Gymnasium	5,482
Suwon Hyundai Hillstate	Suwon	Suwon Gymnasium	4,317

== Regular season ==
=== League table (Male) ===
Pos	Team	Pld	W	L	Pts	SR	SPR	Qualification
1	Cheonan Hyundai Skywalkers	35	28	6	0.829	2.500	1.109	Finals
2	Daejeon Samsung Bluefangs	35	26	9	0.800	2.263	1.134	Semifinals
3	Incheon Korean Air Jumbos	35	22	13	0.629	1.500	1.043	Semifinals
4	Gumi LIG Greaters	35	17	18	0.486	0.970	1.015	
5	Sangmu Volleyball Team	35	8	27	0.229	0.400	0.887	
6	Suwon KEPCO Vixtorm	35	4	31	0.114	0.227	0.827	

=== League table (Female) ===
Pos	Team	Pld	W	L	Pts	SR	SPR	Qualification
1	Incheon GS Caltex KIXX	28	19	9	0.679	1.667	1.084	Finals
2	Daejeon KT&G	28	17	11	0.607	1.137	1.023	Semifinals
3	Cheonan Heungkuk Pink Spiders	28	16	12	0.571	1.226	1.042	Semifinals
4	Suwon Hyundai Hillstate	28	10	18	0.357	0.758	0.945	
5	Gumi Korea Expressway Hi-pass	28	8	20	0.286	0.543	0.912	

== Play-offs ==
=== Bracket (Male) ===
Semifinals
1	Cheonan Hyundai Skywalkers
2	Daejeon Samsung Bluefangs	3	3
3	Incheon Korean Air Jumbos	2	1

Finals
1	Cheonan Hyundai Skywalkers	0	3	1	2
2	Daejeon Samsung Bluefangs	3	1	3	3

=== Bracket (Female) ===
Semifinals
1	Incheon GS Caltex KIXX
2	Daejeon KT&G	2	1
3	Cheonan Heungkuk Pink Spiders	3	3

Finals
1	Incheon GS Caltex KIXX	3	2	1	1
2	Cheonan Heungkuk Pink Spiders	0	3	3	3

== Top Scorers ==
=== Men's ===
Rank	Player	Club	Points
1	(Croatia) Andelko Ćuk	Daejeon Samsung Bluefangs	885
2	(Netherlands) Kay van Dijk	Gumi LIG Greaters	575
2	(Cuba) "Kalla"	Incheon Korean Air Jumbos	575
4	(South Korea) Kim Yo-han	Gumi LIG Greaters	513
5	(United States) Matt Anderson	Cheonan Hyundai Skywalkers	506
6	(South Korea) Park Chul-woo	Cheonan Hyundai Skywalkers	490
7	(South Korea) Lee Kyeong-su	Gumi LIG Greaters	468
8	(South Korea) Lim Dong-kyu	Sangmu Volleyball Team	366
9	(South Korea) Shin Yeong-su	Incheon Korean Air Jumbos	356
10	(South Korea) Kim Dal-ho	Sangmu Volleyball Team	344

=== Women's ===
Rank	Player	Club	Points
1	(Dominican Republic) Milagros Cabral	Gumi Korea Expressway Hi-pass	774
2	(Dominican Republic) Bethania de la Cruz	Incheon GS Caltex KIXX	716
3	(Hungary) Nagy Mariann	Daejeon KT&G	708
4	(South Korea) Kim Yeon-koung	Cheonan Heungkuk Pink Spiders	670
5	(Puerto Rico) Áurea Cruz	Suwon Hyundai Hillstate	624
6	(Puerto Rico) Karina Ocasio	Cheonan Heungkuk Pink Spiders	426
7	(South Korea) Jung Dae-young	Incheon GS Caltex KIXX	392
8	(South Korea) Yang Hyo-jin	Suwon Hyundai Hillstate	357
9	(South Korea) Hwang Youn-joo	Cheonan Heungkuk Pink Spiders	330
10	(South Korea) Kim Se-young	Daejeon KT&G	329

== Player of the Round ==
=== Men's ===
Not awarded

=== Women's ===
Not awarded

== Final standing ==
=== Men's League ===
Rank	Team
1st place, gold medalist(s)	Daejeon Samsung Bluefangs
2nd place, silver medalist(s)	Cheonan Hyundai Skywalkers
3rd place, bronze medalist(s)	Incheon Korean Air Jumbos
4	Gumi LIG Greaters
5	Sangmu Volleyball Team
6	Suwon KEPCO Vixtorm

=== Women's League ===
Rank	Team
1st place, gold medalist(s)	Cheonan Heungkuk Pink Spiders
2nd place, silver medalist(s)	Incheon GS Caltex KIXX
3rd place, bronze medalist(s)	Daejeon KT&G
4	Suwon Hyundai Hillstate
5	Gumi Korea Expressway Hi-pass
