= Kim Su-ji (volleyball) =

South Korean volleyball player (born 1987)

Personal information
- Nationality: South Korean
- Born: 20 June 1987 (age 39); Pyeongtaek, Gyeonggi Province, South Korea
- Height: 186 cm (6 ft 1 in)
- Weight: 68 kg (150 lb)
- Spike: 283 cm (111 in)
- Block: 268 cm (106 in)
- Education: Kangnam University

Volleyball information
- Position: Middle Blocker
- Current club: Heungkuk Life
- Number: 11

Career
Years	Teams
2005–2014; 2014–2017; 2017–2023; 2023-	Hyundai E&C; Heungkuk Life; Hwaseong IBK Altos; Heungkuk Life

National team
2006, 2012-2021	South Korea
Honours
Women's volleyball
Representing South Korea
Asian Games
Bronze medal – third place	2018 Jakarta-Palembang
Asian Championship
Silver medal – second place	2015 Tianjin
Bronze medal – third place	2013 Nakhon Ratchasima
Bronze medal – third place	2017 Metro Manila
Bronze medal – third place	2019 Seoul
- Last updated: 08 August 2021

- Kim Su-ji
- Hangul: 김수지
- Hanja: 金秀智
- RR: Gim Suji
- MR: Kim Suji

Kim Su-ji (Korean: 김수지; Hanja: 金秀智, born 20 June 1987) is a South Korean volleyball player. She is a former member of the South Korea women's national volleyball team which placed fourth in the 2020 Summer Olympics and fifth in the 2016 Summer Olympics. She stepped down from the national team after the former.

She is a middle blocker. She played for Suwon Hyundai Engineering & Construction Hillstate from 2005 to 2014 and Incheon Heungkuk Life Pink Spiders from 2014 to 2017. Since 2017 she has played for Hwaseong IBK Altos. She is a childhood friend of Kim Yeon-koung.

Kim participated in:

- 2012 World Grand Prix
- 2013 the 17th Asia Women's Volleyball Championship
- 2014 World SR. Women's Volleyball Championship Preliminary Round
- 2015 The 18th Asian Sr.Women's Volleyball Championship
- 2015 FIVB Women's World Cup Volleyball
- 2016 Women's World Olympic Qualification Tournament (Japan)
