= Kim Yeon-koung =

South Korean volleyball player

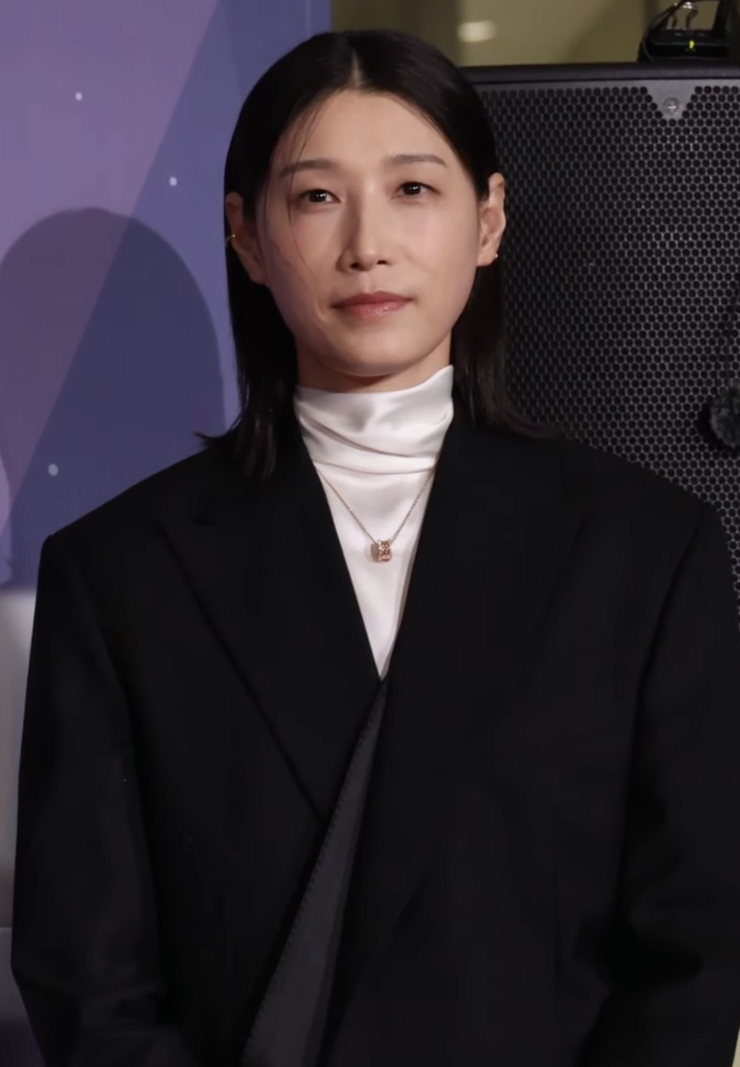
- Kim in 2025

Personal information
- Nicknames: Yaki, Bread Unnie (식빵언니), The God, Asian Gamova, Volleyball Empress/Emperor (배구여제/황제)
- Nationality: South Korean
- Born: 26 February 1988 (age 38) Ansan, South Korea
- Height: 192 cm (6 ft 4 in)
- Weight: 73 kg (161 lb)
- Spike: 330 cm (130 in)
- Block: 320 cm (130 in)

Volleyball information
- Position: Outside hitter
- Number: 10 (national team), 10 (club)

Career
- Years: Team
- 2005–2009 2009–2011 2011–2017 2017–2018 2018–2020 2020–2021 2021–2022 2022–2025: (South Korea) Heungkuk Life (Japan) JT Marvelous (Turkey) Fenerbahçe (China) Shanghai (Turkey) Eczacıbaşı VitrA (South Korea) Heungkuk Life (China) Shanghai (South Korea) Heungkuk Life

National team
- Years: Team
- 2005–2021: South Korea
Honours
Women's volleyball
Representing South Korea
Asian Games
Gold medal – first place	2014 Incheon
Silver medal – second place	2010 Guangzhou
Bronze medal – third place	2018 Jakarta-Palembang
Asian Championship
Silver medal – second place	2015 Tianjin
Bronze medal – third place	2011 Taipei
Bronze medal – third place	2013 Nakhon Ratchasima
Bronze medal – third place	2017 Metro Manila
Bronze medal – third place	2019 Seoul
Asian Cup
Silver medal – second place	2014 Shenzhen
Bronze medal – third place	2010 Taicang

Korean name
- Hangul: 김연경
- Hanja: 金軟景
- RR: Gim Yeongyeong
- MR: Kim Yŏn'gyŏng

YouTube information
- Channel: 식빵언니 김연경 Bread Unnie
- Years active: 2019–present
- Subscribers: 1.26 million
- Views: 136 million
- Last updated: December 31, 2025
- Updated on June 2020

Kim Yeon-koung (Korean: 김연경, Korean pronunciation: [kim.jʌngjʌŋ]; born 26 February 1988) is a South Korean professional volleyball player and a former member of the FIVB Athletes' Commission. She is an outside hitter and the former captain of the South Korean National Team. She announced her retirement from the national team in August 2021.

Kim signed a three-year contract with Fenerbahçe in 2011 after playing for Heungkuk Life in South Korea for four seasons and JT Marvelous in Japan for two seasons. She signed another two-year extension with Fenerbahçe and extended it for another season in 2016. She spent the 2017–18 season in the Chinese Volleyball league and came back to Turkey in the following year with Eczacıbaşı VitrA.

Despite South Korea finishing in 4th place, Kim was the Most Valuable Player and Best Scorer at the 2012 London Olympics, where she set the Olympic record for most points scored (207), topping the previous record of 204 points by Yekaterina Gamova at the 2004 Olympics in Athens.

Kim is the first player in the history of Asian volleyball to receive an MVP award in the CEV Women's Champions League.

Kim is the first player to score at least 30 points four times in a single Olympic volleyball match.

== Career ==
=== Before professional debut (–2005) ===
Kim Yeon-Koung was born in Ansan and started volleyball in 4th grade, initially inspired by her oldest sister who was a volleyball player. In middle school, because she was less than 170 cm (5 ft 7 in), she considered quitting volleyball and becoming a soccer player. Fortunately, during her three years at Hanil Women's High School, she grew more than 20 cm, and moved her position to an outsider hitter from her initial position of a setter and libero.

She received the spotlight of the Korean media due to her outstanding physical condition and performance in the high school stage. As a result, she was selected in the national team in 2005. She made her international debut at the World Grand Champions Cup, where she ranked as 3rd best scorer. Afterwards, she was selected as the first choice in the first round of the V-League draft by the Cheonan Heungkuk Life, where she started her professional volleyball career.

=== Korean V-League (2005–2009) ===
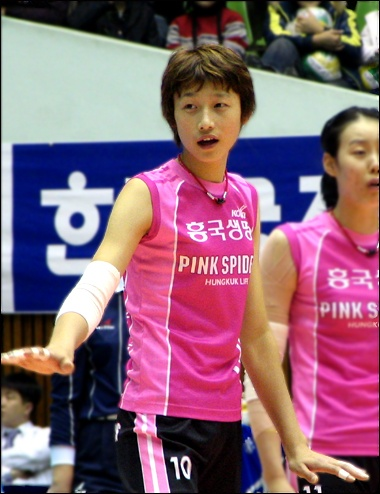
Kim Yeon-Koung playing for Heungkuk Life Pink Spiders in the 2005–06 season.

During her first professional season, Kim contributed to Heungkuk Life becoming the champions of the Korean League. She received every award available, including the 'New Face Award', 'Regular Season MVP', 'Final Championship MVP', 'Best Scorer', 'Best Spiker', and 'Best Server'. However, she had to receive surgery in her right knee afterwards. Before fully recovering from the surgery, she participated in the 2006 World Championship and 2006 Asian Games. Mid-competition, she suffered from serious foot pain as an aftereffect of the surgery.

Heungkuk Life became the reigning champion of the 2006–07 season with the help of Kim. The team achieved the feat of being 1st place in the regular season and winning the finals for two years in a row. Kim was selected as the MVP for both the regular season and championship and was also the best spiker of the regular season. Immediately afterward, she again received articular cartilage surgery. After a few months of recovery, she participated in the World Cup and played full-time.

While she contributed to her team finishing 1st place in the 2007–08 regular season, thus receiving the MVP, her team was defeated by GS Caltex in the finals. She finished the season with the highest success rate yethe received another knee surgery soon after, forcing her to miss the Olympic Qualification for the Beijing Olympics. South Korea was not qualified as a result.

In the 2008–09 season, she became the first female player of the Korean V-League with the record of scoring 2000 points and 2000 attack points. Despite her ground-breaking performance, Heungkuk Life had a difficult season with the replacement of head coach Hyeon-Ju Hwang, finishing 3rd for the regular season. However, the team had a successful post-season performance and won the final championship against GS Caltex. Kim's outstanding performance led to her claiming her third MVP title.

=== Japanese V.Premier League (2009–2011) ===
Kim signed a contract to play overseas in the Japanese V.Premier League with JT Marvelous, becoming South Korea's first professional volleyball player to play overseas after KOVO was founded in 2005. Heungkuk Life and JT Marvelous agreed on a two-year loan agreement for the player with the possibility of a one-year extension negotiated after the first season.

"We had been discussing a move for her since last year. We didn't think about Italy, but we contacted three other Japanese teams, including Toray Arrows, last season's champion," the Pink Spiders official Kim Hyun-do said at press conference. "JT Marvelous failed to find good import players last season, so it was the most active team seeking to sign Kim. In addition, the Marvelous promised that it will support her bid to play for Korea's national team. Though we can't announce her annual salary, the deal is worth more than $300,000," added the official.

With Kim as the main attacking weapon of the team, JT, which were ninth out of 10 teams in the previous season, achieved a miraculous record in the 2009–10 regular season with a winning streak for 25 games, which is second highest record after NEC Red Rockets's 31 winning streak in 2001. Kim was best scorer of the regular season with 696 points in total, leading JT to end first place in the regular season. In the championship final, the team suffered a stunning loss against Toray Arrows. Kim was voted for the 'Fighting Spirit Award' and 'Best 6'.

During the off-season, Kim participated in the KOVO Cup in August as she was still registered for Heungkuk Life, and she led the team to victory as MVP. In September, she was part of the national team roster during the 2010 Asian Cup and became best scorer and best spiker of the tournament. Then she played at the 2010 World Championship where the team finished 13th place and 2010 Asian Games, winning a silver medal, the first medal in her career.

Despite Heungkuk Life's faltering results since Kim left, the team agreed on a loan deal with JT to let Kim play for another year, guaranteeing top-level treatment. She again led her team to becoming first place of 2010–11 regular season. Due to the 2011 Tōhoku earthquake, V.Premier League ended early. JT Marvelous assumed the champion title as a result and Kim was named MVP and 'Best 6'. JT Marvelous also became the champions of the Kurowashiki Tournament, and Kim was again voted as 'Best 6'. She then participated in the Grand Prix, Asian Championship, and World Cup. She was the best scorer and best spiker of the 2011 Asian Championship.

==== Contract dispute with Heungkuk Life ====
After the 2012 London Olympics, Kim had a dispute over her Free Agent Status with her previous Korean team Heungkuk Life. Kim and her agency claimed that she was a free agent, while Heungkuk claimed that she was still tied to the club as a player on loan, citing that she played in the Korean League for four seasons, two seasons short of the qualification as stipulated by the Korea Volleyball Association regulations. Kim countered that she had completed all six seasons with Heungkuk, noting that she played four seasons in Korea, two on loan at JT Marvelous and one on loan at Fenerbahçe.

Despite repeated attempts, the two sides failed to come to an agreement on Kim's status. Another spark started in 2013 when Heungkuk sent the official document explaining the issues between Kim and the team to the association, Ministry of Culture, Sports and Tourism, Korea Sports Council and Korean Volleyball Federation. In that document, Heungkuk accused Kim of mispresenting the truth and using false arguments.

"Kim and her agent asked some politicians to change the rules relaying on her fans. When that didn't work well, she insisted that she was a FA player by mentioning FIVB rules. She'd better stop abusing her popularity and thinking of herself as a privileged player. She should try to solve this problem under the right principles and rules as soon as possible."

Kim and her agent hit back by saying the document had libelous statements and called it improper while both sides were still trying to solve the problem. They also explained that her contract with Heungkuk was terminated on 30 June 2012.

"So she freely signed the contract with Fenerbahce on July 6, 2012. If she really broke the rules in July last year, KVA and KOVO must hold a committee meeting to determine punishment and announce the result. But Heungkuk solely sent the document condemning her to official organizations without following the correct procedures. She didn't extend her contract with Heungkuk because she didn't want to belong to them anymore. I wonder on what legal basis Heungkuk can claim Kim is on the team like their own property."

At a news conference, Kim threatened to retire from the national team if her questions were not answered. Kim made three major demands for Heungkuk, KVA and KOVO: to inquire anew to FIVB whether she has a team she originally belongs to; answer her request for issuance of an agreement of consent on her international transfer she submitted; and answer her appeal against the July 2 public disclosure of her as a "player who randomly bolted her team."

"If I don't receive specific answers to my appeals to the Korea Volleyball Association and the Korea Volleyball Federation, I will not only end my career in the domestic professional league but also retire from the national team."

On September 6, 2013, FIVB sent documents with its final decision on the issue to KVA, Heungkuk, Fenerbahçe and the Turkish Federation. The essence of the decision is the following:

1. The Korean Club is the Player's Club of Origin for the 2013/2014 season.
2. The total amount of transfer fee(s) in favor of the Korean Club and the KVA for the transfer of the Player to the Turkish Club for the 2013/2014 season shall not exceed EUR 228,750. The Player's transfer to the Turkish Club shall not be subject to any other or further restrictions of any kind.
3. After the 2013/2014 season the Player shall be deemed to have no Club of Origin, unless a valid employment contract is signed between the Player and any Korean Club in accordance with the FIVB Regulations.

FIVB explained that a local free agent rule of KOVO can not be applied to an international transfer, and in the case of the latter, FIVB regulations should be respected. If a Korean club has no proper contract with a specific expiration date, a player can freely sign with other clubs abroad regardless of free agent status. Heungkuk protested this decision, saying Fenerbahçe had lobbied FIVB to decide in favor of them. Kim's agency Inspokorea hit back on the alleged unofficial lobbying in a statement, urging Heungkuk to respect FIVB's decision.

=== Fenerbahçe (2011–2017) ===
José Roberto Guimarães persuaded the team president to bring Kim to Fenerbahçe for the 2011-12 season. He later recalls that he saw potential in her to become "one of the best players in the world" despite being relatively unknown in Europe.

She showed a phenomenal performance in her first season playing in Europe, as she helped Fenerbahçe claim their first CEV Champions League champion title. She was awarded best scorer and MVP of the tournament, and was first in both serving and attacking as well.

After her performance against Dinamo Kazan, Alexandre Jioshvili said in an interview with L'Équipe that Kim was the "future Michael Jordan of volleyball", with great skills in both offense and defense.

According to FIVB, she was regarded as the best volleyball player in the world by multiple journalists and coaches alike. One of the journalists asked Kim's opinion on who she considered second best after herself, who is "considered the best attacker in the world." At London 2012, she continued her ground-breaking performance. During the game against Serbia, Kim scored 34 points single-handedly, while her teammates scored 36 points in total. Zoran Terzić reflected that the team had "a lot of problems to make blocks and defend against her," who is "one of the best players in the world, no doubts about it."

For the rest of the tournament, she continued her scoring streak, showing notable performances in the game against Brazil in the preliminary round where Korea won 3–0, and semi-finals against Italy where Korea won 3–1. Korea lost to Japan in the final Bronze Medal Match, despite Kim scoring 22 points with a 47.22% efficiency rate. She was selected as Most Valuable Player of the tournament, becoming the 3rd MVP with no medal after Cintha Boersma and Barbara Jelic. After being named as the MVP of the 2012 London Olympics, Kim was also selected as one of the FIVB Heroes, which is an official campaign of the FIVB to raise awareness about the players' athletic achievements and to increase the worldwide interest in the sport.

Kim had a difficult time in the 2012–13 season due to her dispute with former team Heungkuk Life and her physical injuries. She decided not to have surgery for her right knee after tearing her meniscus during the match against Brazil in the Olympics. Despite such hardships, she was at the top of the statistical leaderboard in terms of scoring, attacking, and serving in the 2013 CEV Cup, continuing to show top performance. The team ultimately lost against Muszyna in the finals. Fenerbahçe finished 4th place for the Turkish League as well, and this became the only season of Kim's professional volleyball life where she finished without winning a single cup. She then participated in the 2013 Asian Championship where she was best scorer and best server.

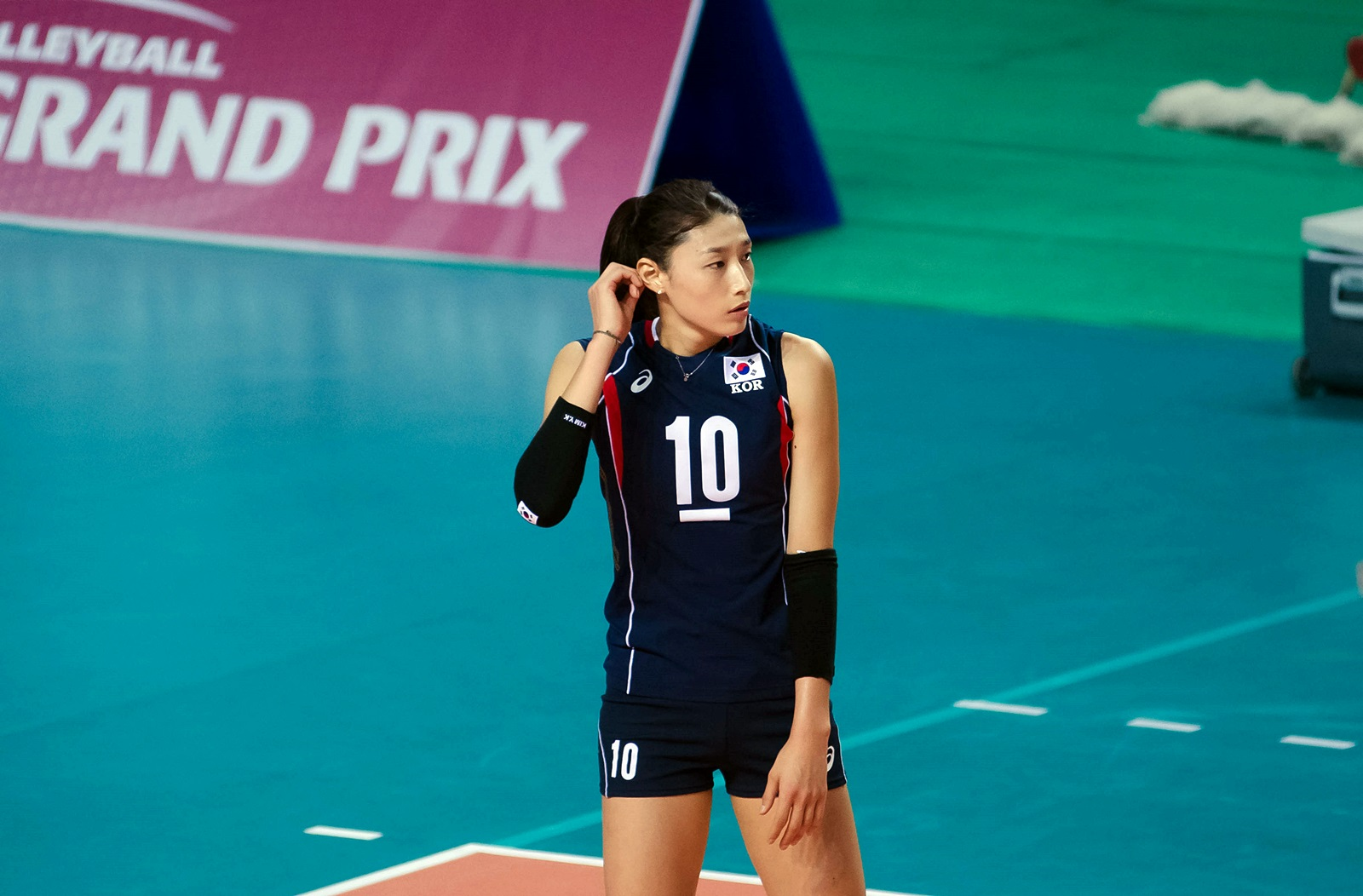
Kim Yeon-koung at the 2014 FIVB Volleyball World Grand Prix in Hwaseong Stadium

In the 2014 World Grand Prix, Kim topped the best score record of the tournament by scoring 42 points in the game against Russia, where South Korea won 3–1. During this tournament, Giovanni Guidetti hailed Kim as the world's best.

"I think Kim Yeon-koung is the best player in the world. I have not seen anyone like her in the last 30 years."

In 2016, Kim was selected as a member of the FIVB Athletes' Commission, which is a group that works as a "link between volleyball players and FIVB". According to FIVB, Kim, being an "MVP at the 2012 London Olympic Game, is a fan's favourite all around the world," thus confirmed by the organization as a member of the Athletes Commission.

During the 2016 Olympic World Qualification Tournament, Kim showed outstanding performance against Netherlands, helping Korea win 3–0. Netherlands head coach Giovanni Guidetti was left in awe, just like two years ago.

"Kim Yeon-koung is something special. I have never seen anything like that in my 20 years in volleyball. We all know she is special, but that was really something."

Kim was selected as best outside spiker of the tournament. At the actual Olympic Tournament two months later, the team finished in 5th place after losing to the Netherlands in the semi-finals. Contrary to her original plans of quitting the National Team after Rio, she said in an interview that she was willing to continue until Tokyo 2020.

=== Chinese Super League (2017–2018) ===
Kim ended her contract with Fenerbahçe where she had spent the past six seasons, and moved to Shanghai. She led Shanghai to first place for the 2017–18 regular season, a feat achieved in 17 years for the team. After finishing runners-up in the finals, she received the Best Foreign Player Award.

=== Eczacıbaşı (2018–2020) ===
After one year in the Chinese League, she returned to Turkey and made a two-year contract with Eczacıbaşı. The team won the Turkish Cup for the first time in seven years, as well as the Super Cup. For the 2019–20 season, she became the new captain of Eczacıbaşı, filling in Jordan Larson's place.

Kim played a decisive role in securing a ticket to the 2020 Tokyo Olympics in the Asian Continental Qualifiers held in Nakhon Ratchasima, Thailand. The exhaustion built up from the Turkish League had led to abdominal pain during the match against Kazakhstan in the pool stage. She was diagnosed with a torn abdominal muscle and missed the semifinal match against Chinese Taipei. However, the captain reappeared in the final match against Thailand and was brilliant in the win that secured a Tokyo berth to her team. After the game, she admitted that she did not feel well and that she played after previously taking painkillers.

After Kim's contract ended with Eczacıbaşı, various media sources reported on the possibility of her going to Beijing, or returning to Korea in light of the COVID-19 pandemic.

=== V-League (2021) ===
In 2021, Kim Yeon-kyung signed a contract with Shanghai, China, where she shared the 2017–2018 season.

== Player profile ==
Kim is considered to be the best player of Korea since playing for the National Team since 2005, topping the score and attack statistics leaderboard in almost every single game. It is a known tactic among coaches to only focus on stopping Kim when playing against Korea, as she is their main and almost only scorer.

- José Roberto Guimarães: Kim Yeon-koung is one of the best spikers in the world. It's very difficult to stop her. She's a wonderful player.
- José Roberto Guimarães: She is a player who understands the game. She helps others. Although she is the best attacker in the world, the most complete, she is not arrogant. She is a player who is a team. She gets along with everyone, everyone likes it. It must be good to play with her.
- Zoran Terzić: We focused only on blocking Kim Yeon-Koung and cared less about the other aspects.
- Giovanni Guidetti: She scores like a diagonal, she receives, digs like a libero, she serves like a machine, she blocks like a middle blocker and what's more important is that she gives incredible energy to her teammates. She is really something extraordinary.
- Giovanni Guidetti: Russian physical strength, American power, Korean technique and Brazilian agility all in one player. She is the best player in the world for sure.
- Massimo Barbolini: Obviously with a player like Kim, number 10, who is one of the best players in the world(...)
- Lang Ping: The Korean team is also worth noticing thanks to the existence of Kim Yeon-Koung. The whole team plays well and Kim makes them even stronger. I think now she is already one of the best hitters in the world and she can also boost her teammates’ performance on the court. As an Asian player, she has had very successful spells in the Turkish League. That's not easy, because the European players are physically stronger than the Asians. But Kim made it, and I think her experience in Europe demonstrated how strong she is.
- Stefano Lavarini: There are great players and great leaders. Kim is all in one. She's one of the best outside hitters in the world and also a really charismatic leader. All the players believe in her and she believes in what they can accomplish and takes them to places they don't expect to reach.

== Injuries ==
Kim has suffered from various injuries throughout her athletic career and has had four knee surgeries alone during 2006 to 2009 while playing for Heungkuk Life.

In 2012, she tore her right meniscus during the preliminary game against Brazil during the 2012 London Olympics which was worsened when failing to land properly during the quarterfinals against Italy. Ahead of the 2012–2013 season, Kim decided to push through with only rehabilitation and not receive surgery despite various health checks that advised her to.

In 2014, Kim broke her toenail whilst training, forcing her to miss a game against Eczacibasi VitrA ahead of playing the 100th game for Fenerbahce.

In 2020, during the game against Kazakhstan in the Asian Olympic Qualification Tournament, she suffered from an abdominal injury. After receiving treatment from a local hospital, she played during the finals against Head Coach Stefano Lavarini's advice. Due to a worsened injury, she has to miss at least a month of the 2019–2020 season playing for Eczacibasi due to rehabilitation.

In 2021, during the second game against Hwaseong IBK Altos, she sustained a thumb injury on her right hand while blocking but continued to play after receiving treatment. During the third game against Hwaseong IBK Altos, Coach Park Mihee of Pink Spiders' said in a pre-match interview that Kim herself decided to play with a taped hand. She also played with a taped hand in the championship game against GS Caltex Seoul KIXX.

== Personal life ==
=== Youth sports academy ===
She is dedicated in youth sports development and runs a sports academy and multiple charity activities under her name. "I wanted to give back all the goodness that volleyball has given me. As time went by, I realized the importance of youth sports, since children who participate in sports activities become more sociable and healthy individuals," she said.

=== Social media ===
Kim created her YouTube channel on 14 July 2019 where she frequently posts videos to share her daily life with her fans. As of October 2021, Kim has over 1,400,000 subscribers with over 75 million views.

Kim is the first volleyball player to achieve more than 1 million subscribers on YouTube.

Kim also currently has over one million followers on Instagram, making her one of the most followed volleyball players in the whole world.

== Club career ==
Name of the Club		Years	League Career
(South Korea)	Cheonan Heungkuk Life	2005–2009	Champion (3), Runners-up (1)
(Japan)	JT Marvelous	2009–2011	Champion (1), Runners-up (1)
(Turkey)	Fenerbahçe	2011–2017	Champion (2), Runners-up (2)
(China)	Shanghai Guohua Life	2017–2018	Runners-up (1)
(Turkey)	Eczacıbaşı VitrA	2018–2020	Runners-up (1)
(South Korea)	Heungkuk Life	2020-2021	Runners-up (1)
(China)	Shanghai Guohua Life	2021-2022	Third place (1)
(South Korea)	Incheon Heungkuk Pink Spiders	2022-2023	Runners-up (1)
(South Korea)	Incheon Heungkuk Pink Spiders	2023-2024	Runners-up (1)
(South Korea)	Incheon Heungkuk Pink Spiders	2024-2025	Champion (1)

=== Worldwide Competitions ===
FIVB Volleyball Club World Championship

- 2012 FIVB Club World Championship – Third place, with Fenerbahçe
- 2018 FIVB Club World Championship – Third place, with Eczacıbaşı VitrA
- 2019 FIVB Club World Championship – Runners-up, with Eczacıbaşı VitrA

=== Continental competitions ===
CEV Champions League

- 2011–12 CEV Champions League – Champion, with Fenerbahçe Universal
- 2015–16 CEV Champions League – Third place, with Fenerbahçe Grundig

CEV Cup

- 2012–13 CEV Cup – Runners-up, with Fenerbahçe
- 2013–14 CEV Cup – Champion, with Fenerbahçe

=== Domestic leagues ===
(South Korea) Korean V-League

- 2005–06 "KT&G V-League" – Champion, with Cheonan Heungkuk Life
- 2006–07 "HILLSTATE V-League" – Champion, with Cheonan Heungkuk Life
- 2007–08 "NH Nonghyup V-League" – Runners-up, with Cheonan Heungkuk Life
- 2008–09 "NH Nonghyup V-League" – Champion, with Cheonan Heungkuk Life
- 2020-2021 "Dodram V-League" – Runners-up, with Incheon Heungkuk Pink Spiders
- 2022-2023 "Dodram V-League" – Runners-up, with Incheon Heungkuk Pink Spiders
- 2023-2024 "Dodram V-League" – Runners-up, with Incheon Heungkuk Pink Spiders
- 2024-2025 "Dodram V-League" – Champion, with Incheon Heungkuk Pink Spiders

(Japan) Japanese V.Premier League

- 2009–10 "V.Premier League" – Runners-up, with JT Marvelous
- 2010–11 "V.Premier League" – Champion, with JT Marvelous

(Turkey) Turkish League

- 2011–12 "Turkish Aroma League" – Third place, with Fenerbahçe Universal
- 2013–14 "Acibadem League" – Runners-up, with Fenerbahçe
- 2014–15 "Turkish Volleyball League" – Champion, with Fenerbahçe Grundig
- 2015–16 "Turkish Volleyball League" – Runners-up, with Fenerbahçe Grundig
- 2016–17 "Vestel Venus Sultanlar Ligi" – Champion, with Fenerbahçe
- 2018-19 "Vestel Venus Sultanlar Ligi" – Runners-up, with Eczacıbaşı VitrA

(China) Chinese Super League

- 2017–18 Chinese Women's Volleyball Super League – Runners-up, with Shanghai Guohua Life
- 2021–22 Chinese Women's Volleyball Super League – Third place, with Shanghai Guohua Life

=== Domestic competitions ===
(South Korea) KOVO Cup

- 2010 "Suwon IBK Volleyball Tournament" – Champion, with Incheon Heungkuk Life
- 2020 "MG 새마을금고 KOVO Cup" – Runners-up, with Incheon Heungkuk Life

Kurowashiki All Japan Volleyball Tournament

- 2009–10 Kurowashiki All Japan Volleyball Tournament – Runners-up, with JT Marvelous
- 2010–11 Kurowashiki All Japan Volleyball Tournament – Champion, with JT Marvelous

(South Korea) / '''Korea-Japan Top Match'''

- 2006 Korea-Japan Top Match – Third place, with Cheonan Heungkuk Life
- 2007 Korea-Japan Top Match – Third place, with Cheonan Heungkuk Life
- 2009 Korea-Japan Top Match – Champion, with Cheonan Heungkuk Life

(Turkey) Turkish Volleyball Cup

- 2013–14 "Teledünya Super Cup" – Runners-up, with Fenerbahçe
- 2014–15 "Super Cup" – Champion, with Fenerbahçe Grundig
- 2016–17 "Volleyball Cup" – Champion, with Fenerbahçe
- 2018–19 "AXA Sigorta Volleyball Cup" – Champion, with Eczacıbaşı VitrA

(Turkey) Turkish Super Cup

- 2011 "Super Cup" – Runners-up, with Fenerbahçe Universal
- 2014 "Spor Toto Champion's Cup" – Runners-up, with Fenerbahçe
- 2015 "Spor Toto Champion's Cup" – Champion, with Fenerbahçe Grundig
- 2018 "Spor Toto Champion's Cup" – Champion, with Eczacıbaşı VitrA
- 2019 "Spor Toto Champion's Cup" – Champion, with Eczacıbaşı VitrA

=== Individual awards ===
- 2005–06 Korean V-League – "MVP of the Month" (December)
- 2005–06 Korean V-League Regular Season – "Most valuable player"
- 2005–06 Korean V-League Finals – "Most valuable player"
- 2005–06 Korean V-League – "New Face Award"
- 2005–06 Korean V-League – "Best spiker"
- 2005–06 Korean V-League – "Best scorer"
- 2005–06 Korean V-League – "Best server"
- 2006–07 Korean V-League – "MVP of the Month" (January)
- 2006–07 Korean V-League Regular Season – "Most valuable player"
- 2006–07 Korean V-League Finals – "Most valuable player"
- 2006–07 Korean V-League – "Best spiker"
- 2007–08 Korean V-League – "MVP of the Month" (December)
- 2007–08 Korean V-League Regular Season – "Most valuable player"
- 2007–08 Korean V-League – "Best spiker"
- 2008–09 Korean V-League – "MVP of the Round" (Round 3)
- 2008–09 Korean V-League Finals – "Most valuable player"
- 2008–09 Korean V-League – "Best server"
- 2009 Korea-Japan Top Match – "Most valuable player"
- 2009–10 Japanese V.Premier League – "Fighting Spirit Award"
- 2009–10 Japanese V.Premier League – "Best scorer"
- 2009–10 Japanese V.Premier League – "Best 6"
- 2010 KOVO Cup – "Most valuable player"
- 2010–11 Japanese V.Premier League – "Most valuable player"
- 2010–11 Japanese V.Premier League – "Best 6"
- 2011 Kurowashiki All Japan Volleyball Tournament – "Best 6"
- 2011–12 CEV Champions League – "Most valuable player"
- 2011–12 CEV Champions League – "Best scorer"
- 2013–14 Turkish League – "Best scorer"
- 2013–14 Turkish League – "Best spiker"
- 2013–14 CEV Cup – "Most valuable player"
- 2014–15 Turkish Volleyball Cup – "Most valuable player"
- 2014–15 Turkish League – "Most valuable player"
- 2014–15 Turkish League – "Best scorer"
- 2014–15 Turkish League – "Best spiker"
- 2015 Turkish Super Cup – "Most valuable player"
- 2015–16 Turkish League – "Best outside spiker"
- 2015–16 CEV Champions League – "Best outside spiker"
- 2017–18 Chinese Super League – "MVP of the Round" (Round 2)
- 2017–18 Chinese Super League – "Best 7 of the Round" (Round 2)
- 2017–18 Chinese Super League – "Best Foreign Player"
- 2019 FIVB Club World Championship – "Best outside spiker"
- 2020 KOVO Cup – "Most Important Player"
- 2020–21 Korean V-League – "MVP of the Round" (Round 1)
- 2020-21 Korean V-League - "Best outside spiker"
- 2020–21 Korean V-League Regular Season – "Most valuable player"
- 2021–22 Chinese Super League – "Best receiver"
- 2022–23 Korean V-League – "MVP of the Round" (Round 1)
- 2022–23 Korean V-League – "MVP of the Round" (Round 3)
- 2022–23 Korean V-League – "MVP of the Round" (Round 5)
- 2022–23 Korean V-League – "MVP of the Round" (Round 6)
- 2022-23 Korean V-League - "Best outside spiker"
- 2022–23 Korean V-League Regular Season – "Most valuable player"
- 2023–24 Korean V-League – "MVP of the Round" (Round 2)
- 2023–24 Korean V-League – "MVP of the Round" (Round 5)
- 2023-24 Korean V-League - "Best outside spiker"
- 2023–24 Korean V-League Regular Season – "Most valuable player"
- 2024–25 Korean V-League – "MVP of the Round" (Round 1)
- 2024–25 Korean V-League – "MVP of the Round" (Round 2)
- 2024–25 Korean V-League – "MVP of the Round" (Round 5)
- 2024–25 Korean V-League Regular Season – "Most valuable player"
- 2024–25 Korean V-League Finals – "Most valuable player"

== National team career ==
=== Junior team ===
- 2004 Asian Junior Championship – (bronze) Bronze Medal
- 2005 FIVB U18 World Championship – 5th place

=== Worldwide competitions ===
- Summer Olympics
  - 2012 London – 4th place
  - 2016 Rio – 5th place
  - 2020 Tokyo – 4th place
- World Olympic Qualification Tournament
  - 2012 Japan – 2nd place
  - 2016 Japan – 4th place
- FIVB World Championship
  - 2006 Japan – 13th place
  - 2010 Japan – 13th place
  - 2018 Japan – 17th place
- FIVB World Cup
  - 2007 Japan – 8th place
  - 2011 Japan – 9th place
  - 2015 Japan – 6th place
  - 2019 Japan – 6th place
- World Grand Champions Cup
  - 2005 Japan – 6th place
  - 2009 Japan – 5th place
- FIVB World Grand Prix
  - 2009 Tokyo – 12th place
  - 2011 Macau – 9th place
  - 2012 Ningbo – 14th place
  - 2014 Tokyo – 8th place
  - 2017 Nanjing – 14th place
- FIVB Volleyball Nations League
  - 2018 Nanjing – 12th place
  - 2019 Nanjing – 15th place
  - 2021 Rimini – 15th place

=== Continental competitions ===
- Asian Games
  - 2006 Doha – 5th place
  - 2010 Guangzhou – (silver) Silver Medal
  - 2014 Incheon – (gold) Gold Medal
  - 2018 Jakarta–Palembang – (bronze) Bronze Medal
- Asian Championship
  - 2009 Hanoi – 4th place
  - 2011 Taipei – (bronze) Bronze Medal
  - 2013 Nakhon Ratchasima – (bronze) Bronze Medal
  - 2015 Tianjin – (silver) Silver Medal
  - 2017 Biñan – (bronze) Bronze Medal
  - 2019 Seoul – (bronze) Bronze Medal
- AVC Asian Cup
  - 2010 Taicang – (bronze) Bronze Medal
  - 2014 Shenzhen – (silver) Silver Medal

=== Individual awards ===
The following were Not Awarded:

- 2011 FIVB World Grand Prix Preliminary Round – Best scorer
- 2014 FIVB World Grand Prix Preliminary Round – Best scorer
- 2014 FIVB World Grand Prix Preliminary Round – Best server
- 2014 Asian Games – Best spiker
- 2015 FIVB World Cup – Best scorer
- 2017 FIVB World Grand Prix Group 2 – Best scorer
- 2018 Asian Games – Best scorer

The following were Awarded:

- 2004 U19 Asian Championship – "Best scorer"
- 2005 U17 Asian Championship – "Best scorer"
- 2005 U17 Asian Championship – "Best receiver"
- 2009 FIVB World Grand Champions Cup – "Best scorer"
- 2009 Asian Championship – "Best scorer"
- 2010 AVC Asian Cup – "Best scorer"
- 2010 AVC Asian Cup – "Best spiker"
- 2011 Asian Championship – "Best scorer"
- 2011 Asian Championship – "Best spiker"
- 2012 Summer Olympics World Qualification Tournament – "Best scorer"
- 2012 Summer Olympics World Qualification Tournament – "Best spiker"
- 2012 Summer Olympics World Qualification Tournament – "Best receiver"
- 2012 Summer Olympics – "Most valuable player"
- 2012 Summer Olympics – "Best scorer"
- 2013 Asian Championship – "Best scorer"
- 2013 Asian Championship – "Best server"
- 2014 AVC Asian Cup – "Best opposite spiker"
- 2015 Asian Championship – "Best outside spiker"
- 2016 Summer Olympics World Qualification Tournament – "Best outside spiker"
- 2017 Asian Championship – "Best outside spiker"
- 2019 Asian Championship – "Best outside spiker"

== Additional awards ==
- 2009 DongA Sports – "Grand Prize in Professional Volleyball"
- 2012 MBN Women's Sports Category – "May MVP"
- 2017 Korean National Council of Women – "Woman of the Year"
- 2017 Brand of the Year Korea – "Athlete of the Year"
- 2020 MBN Women's Sport - "Grand Prize"
- 2021 Pony Chung Foundation - "Young Leader Award"
- 2021 Korea National Brand Award Grand Prize – "Sports Sector"
- 19th Citi-YWCA Korean Women's Leadership Award – "Special Award" (2021)

== Career statistics ==
=== Season by club ===
==== League (regular season and finals) ====
Team	Season	League	Played		Points		Serve		Reception						Attack						Block	
Team	Season	League	M	S	Tot	per set	Ace	per set	Tot	Err	Exc	Pos%	Exc%	Eff	Tot	Err	Blk	Exc	Exc%	Eff	Pts	per set
Heungkuk Life	2005–06	Korean V-League	33	128	910	7.11	48	0.38	559	16	360	–	64.4%	0.62	1627	142	58	646	39.7%	0.27	40	0.31
Heungkuk Life	2006–07	Korean V-League	27	106	679	6.41	34	0.32	571	16	332	–	58.1%	0.55	1183	75	44	532	45.0%	0.35	43	0.41
Heungkuk Life	2007–08	Korean V-League	32	119	751	6.31	26	0.22	693	18	425	–	61.3%	0.59	1329	103	48	621	46.7%	0.35	37	0.31
Heungkuk Life	2008–09	Korean V-League	34	142	826	5.82	53	0.37	868	13	522	–	60.1%	0.59	1469	101	54	703	47.9%	0.37	70	0.49
JT Marvelous	2009–10	V.Premier League	32	116	805	6.94	20	0.17	731	–	435	–	59.5%	–	1553	104	–	732	47.1%	–	53	0.46
JT Marvelous	2010–11	V.Premier League	22	77	471	6.12	17	0.22	437	–	314	–	71.9%	–	849	75	–	425	50.1%	–	29	0.38
Fenerbahçe	2013–14	Turkish League	27	93	474	5.10	48	0.52	501	42	180	59.3%	35.9%	0.28	846	69	31	394	46.6%	0.35	32	0.34
Fenerbahçe	2014–15	Turkish League	23	77	435	5.65	60	0.78	399	46	124	50.6%	31.1%	0.20	744	62	25	336	45.2%	0.33	39	0.51
Fenerbahçe	2015–16	Turkish League	19	71	329	4.63	16	0.23	410	23	131	53.9%	32.0%	0.26	662	24	30	289	43.7%	0.30	24	0.34
Fenerbahçe	2016–17	Turkish League	23	81	367	4.53	31	0.38	421	45	98	51.1%	23.3%	0.13	676	54	22	308	45.6%	0.34	28	0.35
Shanghai	2017–18	Chinese League	28	108	573	5.31	44	0.40	450	11	382	–	84.9%	0.82	954	117	–	487	51.0%	–	42	0.39
Eczacıbaşı	2018–19	Turkish League	26	83	305	3.67	15	0.18	452	25	121	53.5%	26.8%	0.21	642	41	35	266	41.4%	0.30	24	0.29
Eczacıbaşı	2019–20	Turkish League	7	25	99	3.96	9	0.36	106	5	21	48.1%	19.8%	0.09	184	13	10	81	44.0%	0.32	9	0.36

==== Domestic cups and regional competitions ====
Team	Season	League	Played		Points		Serve		Reception					Attack						Block	
Team	Season	League	M	S	Tot	per set	Ace	per set	Tot	Err	Exc	Pos%	Exc%	Tot	Err	Blk	Exc	Exc%	Eff	Pts	per set
Heungkuk Life	2009–10	KOVO Cup	3	11	78	7.09	8	0.73	42	1	23	–	54.8%	120	10	4	61	50.8%	0.39	9	0.82
JT Marvelous	2010-11	Kurowashiki Tournament	3	11	80	7.27	2	0.18	62	-	50	-	80.6%	144	12	-	71	49.3%	0.41	7	0.64
Fenerbahçe	2011–12	Turkish Super Cup																			
Fenerbahçe	2011–12	Champions League	12	40	228	5.70	18	0.45	85	13	34	64.8%	40.0%	409	43	15	193	47.2%	0.33	17	0.42
Fenerbahçe	2011–12	Season Total																			
Fenerbahçe	2012–13	Turkish Cup																			
Fenerbahçe	2012–13	CEV Cup	8	30	182	6.07	14	0.47	125	9	54	62.4%	43.2%	325	32	13	152	46.8%	0.33	16	0.53
Fenerbahçe	2012–13	Season Total																			
Fenerbahçe	2013–14	Turkish Cup	5	17	97	5.71	12	0.71	102	7	36	51%	35.3%	173	13	6	80	46.2%	0.35	5	0.29
Fenerbahçe	2013–14	CEV Cup	8	25	134	5.36	21	0.84	121	13	37	45.5%	30.6%	195	11	9	99	50.8%	0.41	14	0.56
Fenerbahçe	2013–14	Season Total	13	42	231	5.50	33	0.79	223	20	73	-	32.7%	368	24	15	179	48.6%	0.38	19	0.45
Fenerbahçe	2014–15	Turkish Super Cup	1	3	11	3.67	0	0.00	13	1	4	30.8%	30.8%	32	4	6	10	31.2%	0.00	1	0.33
Fenerbahçe	2014–15	Turkish Cup	2	8	56	7.00	4	0.50	38	2	11	45%	28.9%	97	9	4	45	46.4%	0.33	7	0.87
Fenerbahçe	2014–15	Champions League	8	30	177	5.90	30	1.00	144	14	40	55.6%	27.8%	315	24	16	143	45.4%	0.33	4	0.13
Fenerbahçe	2014–15	Season Total	11	41	244	5.95	34	0.83	195	17	55	-	28.2%	444	37	26	198	44.6%	0.30	12	0.29
Fenerbahçe	2015–16	Turkish Super Cup	1	5	31	6.20	0	0.00	11	0	2	36%	18.2%	55	5	3	26	47.3%	0.33	5	1.00
Fenerbahçe	2015–16	Champions League	12	43	229	5.33	20	0.47	265	11	86	57.3%	32.5%	424	31	8	193	45.5%	0.36	16	0.37
Fenerbahçe	2015–16	Season Total	13	48	260	5.42	20	0.42	276	11	88	-	31.9%	479	36	11	219	45.7%	0.36	21	0.44
Fenerbahçe	2016–17	Turkish Cup	3	10	46	4.60	7	0.70	43	3	16	58.1%	37.2%	80	8	5	37	46.2%	0.30	2	0.20
Fenerbahçe	2016–17	Champions League	6	21	103	4.90	12	0.57	96	15	21	57.3%	21.9%	191	13	9	83	43.5%	0.32	8	0.38
Fenerbahçe	2016–17	Season Total	9	31	149	4.81	19	0.61	139	18	37	-	26.6%	271	21	14	120	44.3%	0.31	10	0.32
Eczacıbaşı	2018–19	Turkish Super Cup	1	4	10	2.50	0	0.00	20	3	11	60.0%	55.0%	26	4	4	9	34.6%	0.04	1	0.25
Eczacıbaşı	2018–19	Turkish Cup	3	6	26	4.33	4	0.67	37	6	6	40.5%	16.2%	40	2	2	21	52.5%	0.42	1	0.17
Eczacıbaşı	2018–19	Club World Championship	5	17	66	3.88	3	0.18	122	4	19	-	15.6%	128	9	-	56	43.8%	0.37	7	0.41
Eczacıbaşı	2018–19	Champions League	8	27	119	4.41	12	0.44	158	6	46	54.4%	29.1%	207	14	10	97	46.9%	0.35	10	0.37
Eczacıbaşı	2018–19	Season Total	17	54	221	4.09	19	0.35	337	19	82	-	24.3%	401	29	-	183	45.6%	0.34	19	0.35
Eczacıbaşı	2019–20	Turkish Super Cup	1	5	16	3.20	1	0.20	27	1	9	44.4%	33.3%	31	1	3	11	35.5%	0.23	4	0.80
Eczacıbaşı	2019–20	Club World Championship	5	19	72	3.79	9	0.47	118	7	53	-	44.9%	135	18	-	55	40.7%	0.27	8	0.42
Eczacıbaşı	2019–20	Season Total	6	24	88	3.67	10	0.42	145	8	62	-	42.8%	166	19	-	66	39.8%	0.28	12	0.50

== Filmography ==
=== TV show ===
- Kian's Bizarre B&B - (Season 2)
- Strong Heart (TV series) - (guest, Ep. 144, 145)
- Running Man – (guest, Ep. 257, 572, 573, 574)
- I Live Alone – (guest, Ep. 175, 176, 188, 205, 232, 233, 234, 300, 301, 356, 360, 412, 413)
- Baek Jong-won's Top 3 Chef King - (guest, Ep. 49)
- Our Neighborhood Arts and Physical Education – (guest, Ep. 162)
- Sister's Slam Dunk – (guest, Season 1, Ep. 22, 23)
- Non-Summit – (guest, Ep. 151)
- Infinite Challenge – (guest, Ep. 496)
- Hello Counselor – (guest, Ep. 364)
- Radio Star - (guest, Ep. 638, 738, 739)
- Master in the House – (guest, Ep. 122, 123)
- Hangout with Yoo - (guest, Ep. 45)
- Bob Bless You 2 - (guest, Ep. 15)
- Knowing Bros - (guest, Ep. 239)
- Paik's Spirit - (guest, Ep. 5)
- The Barracks - The World the Youngest Lives - Host (2022)

=== Film ===
Year	Title	Role	Notes	Ref.
2022	One Win		Special appearance	

=== Web shows ===
Year	Title	Role	Notes	Ref.
2022	Korea No. 1	Cast Member	with Yoo Jae-suk and Lee Kwang-soo	
2025	Wonder Coach	Coach	Portrays Rookie Coach and joins a newly formed team, Wonder Dogs	

== Awards and nominations ==
Name of the award ceremony, year presented, category, nominee of the award, and the result of the nomination
Award ceremony	Year	Category	Nominee / Work	Result	Ref.
Baeksang Arts Awards	2026	Best Female Variety Performer	Kim Yeon-koung	Nominated	
Blue Dragon Series Awards	2023	TIRTIR Popularity Star Award	Kim Yeon-koung	Won	
Korea First Brand Award	2022	Female CF Model	Kim Yeon-koung	Won	

== Publications ==
- It's Not Yet the End (아직 끝이 아니다/2016)
- It's Not Yet the End, Children's Book (아직 끝이 아니다-Super 지구별 배구왕 김연경/2018)

Awards
Preceded by (Brazil) Sheilla Castro	Best Scorer of World Grand Champions Cup; 2009	Succeeded by -
Preceded by (South Korea) Kim Min-ji	Best Scorer of Asian Cup; 2010	Succeeded by (Thailand) Onuma Sittirak
Preceded by (China) Wang Yimei	Best Spiker of Asian Cup; 2010	Succeeded by (Thailand) Onuma Sittirak
Preceded by (China) Xue Ming	Best Spiker of Asian Championship; 2011	Succeeded by (China) Zhu Ting
Preceded by (Poland) Małgorzata Glinka	Most Valuable Player of CEV Champions League; 2011-2012	Succeeded by (Serbia) Jovana Brakočević
Preceded by (Serbia) Jelena Nikolić	Best Scorer of CEV Champions League; 2011-2012	Succeeded by (Colombia) Madelaynne Montano
Preceded by (Brazil) Paula Pequeno	Most Valuable Player of Olympic Games; 2012	Succeeded by (China) Zhu Ting
Preceded by (United States) Logan Tom	Best Scorer of Olympic Games; 2012	Succeeded by -
Preceded by (Kazakhstan) Yelena Pavlova	Best Scorer of Asian Championship; 2009, 2011, 2013	Succeeded by -
Preceded by (China) Wei Qiuyue	Best Server of Asian Championship; 2013	Succeeded by -
Preceded by -	Most Valuable Player of CEV Cup; 2013-2014	Succeeded by (Russia) Tatiana Kosheleva
Preceded by -	Best Opposite Spiker of Asian Cup; 2014	Succeeded by (Kazakhstan) Yekaterina Zhdanova
Preceded by (Dominican Republic) Bethania de la Cruz (Czech Republic) Helena Havelková	Best Outside Spiker of CEV Champions League; 2015-2016 (with (United States) Kimberly Hill)	Succeeded by (United States) Kelsey Robinson (United States) Kimberly Hill
Preceded by -	Best Outside Spiker of Asian Championship; 2015 (with (China) Zhu Ting); 2017 (with (Thailand) Chatchu-on Moksri); 2019 (with (Japan) Mayu Ishikawa)	Succeeded by TBD
Preceded by (Brazil) Gabriela Guimarães (China) Zhu Ting	Best Outside Spiker of FIVB Club World Championship; 2019 (with (United States) Kimberly Hill)	Succeeded by TBD
