= Katie Wilkins =

American volleyball player

Personal information
- Full name: Katherine Wilkins
- Born: May 10, 1982 (age 44); Lakeside, California, U.S.
- Height: 6 ft 4 in (193 cm)
- Weight: 179 lb (81 kg)
- Spike: 122 in (309 cm)
- Block: 118 in (299 cm)

Volleyball information
- Number: 8 (national team)

National team
2005–2007	(United States) USA
Medal record
Women's volleyball
Representing United States
NORCECA Championship
Gold medal – first place	2005 Port of Spain	Team
Silver medal – second place	2007 Winnipeg	Team
World Grand Champions Cup
Silver medal – second place	2005 Nagoya	Team

Katherine "Katie" Wilkins (born May 10, 1982, in Lakeside, California) is an American former volleyball player. She was part of the USA women's national volleyball team at the 2006 FIVB Volleyball Women's World Championship in Japan.

Wilkins graduated from Valley Christian High in El Cajon, California in 2000. She attended Pepperdine University and was selected for the All-America first team by the American Volleyball Coaches Association in 2003 after 2 prior selections for the second team. During her time at Pepperdine, the team made four appearances in the NCAA Championships, reaching the "Elite 8" on two occasions, as well as being seeded first in 2003.

From 2006 to 2007, Wilkins played professionally for the Incheon Heungkuk Life Pink Spiders in South Korea's V-League, where she helped the Spiders to win the second consecutive championship.
