= Red Sparks =

South Korean women's volleyball team

Daejeon Jung Kwan Jang Red Sparks
- Full name: Daejeon Jung Kwan Jang Red Sparks Women's Volleyball Club 대전 정관장 레드스파크스 여자 배구단
- Short name: Red Sparks
- Founded: 1988; 38 years ago
- Ground: Chungmu Gymnasium; Daejeon, South Korea (Capacity: 6,000)
- Owner: Korea Ginseng Corporation
- Chairman: Bang Hyung-bong
- Manager: Ko Hee-jin
- Captain: Yeum Hye-seon
- League: V-League
- 2025−26: Regular season: 7th Postseason: Did not qualify
- Website: Club home page

Uniforms
Home	Away

Daejeon Jung Kwan Jang Red Sparks (Korean: 대전 정관장 레드스파크스) is a South Korean professional women's volleyball team. The team was founded in 1988 and became fully professional in 2005. They are based in Daejeon and are members of the Korea Volleyball Federation (KOVO). Their home arena is Chungmu Gymnasium in Daejeon.

== Honours ==
- Korea Volleyball Super League

Runners-up: 2002

- V-League

Champions (3): 2005, 2009−10, 2011−12
Runners-up: 2024–25

- KOVO Cup

Winners (2): 2008, 2018
Runners-up (5): 2007, 2011, 2016, 2019, 2024

== Season-by-season records ==
V-League record
League	Season	Postseason	Regular season				
League	Season	Postseason	Rank	Games	Won	Lost	Points
V-League	2005	Champions	2	16	11	5	—
V-League	2005–06	Playoff	3	28	16	12	—
V-League	2006–07	Did not qualify	5	24	3	21	—
V-League	2007–08	Playoff	2	28	17	11	—
V-League	2008–09	Playoff	2	28	17	11	—
V-League	2009–10	Champions	2	28	19	9	—
V-League	2010–11	Did not qualify	4	24	8	16	—
V-League	2011–12	Champions	1	30	20	10	62
V-League	2012–13	Did not qualify	6	30	5	25	15
V-League	2013–14	Playoff	3	30	14	16	48
V-League	2014–15	Did not qualify	6	30	8	22	26
V-League	2015–16	Did not qualify	6	30	7	23	22
V-League	2016–17	Playoff	3	30	15	15	44
V-League	2017–18	Did not qualify	5	30	12	18	35
V-League	2018–19	Did not qualify	6	30	6	24	21
V-League	2019–20	Cancelled	4	26	13	13	36
V-League	2020–21	Did not qualify	5	30	13	17	39
V-League	2021–22	Cancelled	4	32	15	17	46
V-League	2022–23	Did not qualify	4	36	19	17	56
V-League	2023–24	Playoff	3	36	20	16	61
V-League	2024–25	Runners-up	3	36	23	13	64
V-League	2025–26	Did not qualify	7	36	8	28	26
