= 2012 FIVB Women's World Olympic Qualification Tournament =

Volleyball qualification tournament for the 2012 Olympics

The 2012 FIVB Women's World Olympic Qualification Tournament is a qualification tournament to determine the remaining four competitor spots for Volleyball at the 2012 Summer Olympics. The event also doubles as the Asian Olympic Qualification Tournament; the best three teams plus the best Asian team (outside the top-three ranking) will compete in the 2012 Summer Olympics.

Host nation Japan are joined by the three best-ranked teams from the Asian Continental Championship, plus (according to the FIVB World Rankings, as of 4 January 2012) the two best-ranked teams from Confédération Européenne de Volleyball (CEV) that did not qualify in the European qualification tournament, the best-ranked team from North, Central America and Caribbean Volleyball Confederation (NORCECA) that did not qualify in the NORCECA qualification tournament, and the best-ranked team from Confederación Sudamericana de Voleibol (CSV) or Confédération Africaine de Volleyball (CAVB) that did not qualify in the respective qualification tournament.

== Qualified teams ==
- Host nation
  - Japan
- Qualified through 2011 Asian Women's Volleyball Championship
  - South Korea
  - Thailand
  - Chinese Taipei
- Qualified through FIVB World Rankings as of 4 January 2012
  - Serbia (as CEV 1 – no. 6)
  - Russia (as CEV 2 – no. 7)
  - Cuba (as NORCECA 1 – no. 10)
  - Peru (as CSV 1 or CAVB 1 – no. 17)^{1}
- Venue: Tokyo Metropolitan Gymnasium, Tokyo, Japan
- Dates: 19–27 May 2012
- All times are Japan Standard Time (UTC+09:00).

^1 – Replacing Kenya, which had a better world ranking (no. 15) but withdrew.

== Standings ==
The competition system for the tournament is the single Round-Robin system. Each team plays once against each of the 7 remaining teams. Points are accumulated during the whole tournament, and the final ranking is determined by the total points gained.

Pos	Team	Pld	W	L	Pts	SW	SL	SR	SPW	SPL	SPR
1	Russia	7	7	0	21	21	1	21.000	539	400	1.348
2	South Korea	7	5	2	15	16	7	2.286	538	449	1.198
3	Serbia	7	5	2	14	16	10	1.600	572	537	1.065
4	Japan	7	4	3	12	15	11	1.364	569	529	1.076
5	Thailand	7	4	3	12	12	10	1.200	487	485	1.004
6	Cuba	7	2	5	7	9	15	0.600	530	544	0.974
7	Peru	7	1	6	3	4	18	0.222	412	531	0.776
8	Chinese Taipei	7	0	7	0	0	21	0.000	355	527	0.674

== Results ==
=== Day 1 ===
Date	Time		Score		Set 1	Set 2	Set 3	Set 4	Set 5	Total	Report
19 May	11:00	Chinese Taipei	0–3	Serbia	19–25	15–25	16–25			50–75	P2P3
19 May	13:30	Thailand	0–3	Russia	19–25	18–25	16–25			53–75	P2P3
19 May	16:00	South Korea	3–0	Cuba	25–19	25–23	25–20			75–62	P2P3
19 May	19:10	Japan	3–0	Peru	25–13	25–21	25–18			75–52	P2P3

=== Day 2 ===
Date	Time		Score		Set 1	Set 2	Set 3	Set 4	Set 5	Total	Report
20 May	11:00	Serbia	0–3	Thailand	19–25	17–25	20–25			56–75	P2P3
20 May	13:30	Peru	0–3	Cuba	19–25	21–25	15–25			55–75	P2P3
20 May	16:00	Russia	3–0	South Korea	25–16	25–23	25–23			75–62	P2P3
20 May	19:10	Japan	3–0	Chinese Taipei	25–16	25–13	25–14			75–43	P2P3

=== Day 3 ===
Date	Time		Score		Set 1	Set 2	Set 3	Set 4	Set 5	Total	Report
22 May	11:00	Chinese Taipei	0–3	Peru	19–25	20–25	20–25			59–75	P2P3
22 May	13:30	Cuba	0–3	Russia	19–25	18–25	20–25			57–75	P2P3
22 May	16:00	South Korea	1–3	Serbia	25–16	21–25	13–25	20–25		79–91	P2P3
22 May	19:10	Japan	3–0	Thailand	25–17	25–18	25–21			75–56	P2P3

=== Day 4 ===
Date	Time		Score		Set 1	Set 2	Set 3	Set 4	Set 5	Total	Report
23 May	11:00	Peru	0–3	Russia	17–25	16–25	9–25			42–75	P2P3
23 May	13:30	Chinese Taipei	0–3	Thailand	16–25	18–25	20–25			54–75	P2P3
23 May	16:00	Serbia	3–0	Cuba	25–21	25–23	25–19			75–63	P2P3
23 May	19:10	Japan	1–3	South Korea	18–25	25–22	17–25	13–25		73–97	P2P3

=== Day 5 ===
Date	Time		Score		Set 1	Set 2	Set 3	Set 4	Set 5	Total	Report
25 May	11:00	Thailand	3–0	Peru	25–19	25–19	25–20			75–58	P2P3
25 May	13:30	Russia	3–1	Serbia	25–18	25–11	14–25	25–22		89–76	P2P3
25 May	16:00	South Korea	3–0	Chinese Taipei	25–8	25–12	25–18			75–38	P2P3
25 May	19:05	Japan	3–2	Cuba	25–23	18–25	25–16	23–25	17–15	108–104	P2P3

=== Day 6 ===
Date	Time		Score		Set 1	Set 2	Set 3	Set 4	Set 5	Total	Report
26 May	11:00	Peru	1–3	Serbia	16–25	18–25	25–22	21–25		80–97	P2P3
26 May	13:30	Chinese Taipei	0–3	Cuba	25–27	17–25	21–25			63–77	P2P3
26 May	16:00	Thailand	0–3	South Korea	18–25	22–25	20–25			60–75	P2P3
26 May	19:05	Japan	0–3	Russia	22–25	20–25	20–25			62–75	P2P3

=== Day 7 ===
Date	Time		Score		Set 1	Set 2	Set 3	Set 4	Set 5	Total	Report
27 May	11:00	Cuba	1–3	Thailand	23–25	23–25	25–18	21–25		92–93	P2P3
27 May	13:30	Russia	3–0	Chinese Taipei	25–14	25–17	25–17			75–48	P2P3
27 May	16:00	South Korea	3–0	Peru	25–11	25–18	25–21			75–50	P2P3
27 May	19:05	Japan	2–3	Serbia	25–18	21–25	25–19	21–25	9–15	101–102	P2P3

== Individual awards ==
- Best scorer
  - Kim Yeon-Koung (KOR)
- Best spiker
  - Kim Yeon-Koung (KOR)
- Best blocker
  - Yang Hyo-Jin (KOR)
- Best server
  - Yanelis Santos (CUB)
- Best digger
  - Hua Yang Meng (TPE)
- Best setter
  - Nootsara Tomkom (THA)
- Best receiver
  - Kim Yeon-Koung (KOR)
- Best libero
  - Hua Yang Meng (TPE)

== Controversy ==
The last game of the tournament which Japan lost to Serbia 2–3 was controversial in that it was allegedly a fixed match. The FIVB then conducted an investigation into whether the Japanese women's team deliberately lost against Serbia before concluding that there was no evidence to prove the existence of match fixing.

=== Background ===
Before the controversial match, Japan had gained 11 points to put them in 5th place, while Serbia had 12 points, placing them 3rd.

Pos	Team	Pld	W	L	Pts	SW	SL	SR	SPW	SPL	SPR
1	Russia	7	7	0	21	21	1	21.000	539	400	1.348
2	South Korea	7	5	2	15	16	7	2.286	538	449	1.198
3	Serbia	6	4	2	12	13	8	1.625	470	436	1.078
4	Thailand	7	4	3	12	12	10	1.200	487	485	1.004
5	Japan	6	4	2	11	13	8	1.625	468	427	1.096
6	Cuba	7	2	5	7	9	15	0.600	530	544	0.974
7	Peru	7	1	6	3	4	18	0.222	412	531	0.776
8	Chinese Taipei	7	0	7	0	0	21	0.000	355	527	0.674

For the last game, the qualification outcome could have fallen into one of three scenarios:

- If Japan beat Serbia by any score, Japan and Thailand would qualify.
- If Japan loses 0–3 or 1–3, Serbia and Thailand would qualify.
- If Japan loses 2–3, Serbia and Japan would qualify.

=== Match details and consequences ===
In the 1st set, Japan took an 8–5 lead at the first technical time-out. After that, Serbia levelled the score at 10–10. Erika Araki spiked to let Japan lead 16–14 at the second TTO and then drilled a spike right down the middle to give Japan the set 25–18. Serbia returned to claim the 2nd set 21–25. Japan came back in the 3rd set with a 10-point lead, 16–6, 18–8, 20–10 and 22–12 before closing the set 25–19. After the 3rd set, Japan had already qualified for 2012 Summer Olympics regardless of what would have happened after, so they didn't have to play seriously. However in the 4th set, Japan was up 19–16 before Serbia made 6 consecutive points, ending with a win for Serbia at 21–25.

After the match, Masayoshi Manabe, coach of Japan, released a statement.

We knew this was the last day. Everybody was nervous. We knew we had to get two sets. Yoshie Takeshita is ill from mental and physical exhaustion after this match. We told the players at the morning meeting that we had to give it (our) full power tonight. We have to work on our serve reception in the two months leading up to the Olympics.

Serbia's win also meant that they qualified ahead of Thailand, which had hoped to reach the Olympics for the first time. Had Japan beaten Serbia, Thailand would have also qualified along with Japan. But in such a situation, Japan would have been placed in a tough group in London alongside defending champions Brazil, the world number-one United States, Asian champions China and the new European force Turkey. Thai captain, Wilavan Apinyapong, was disappointed but said that the Olympic Games remained their ultimate dream.

=== Investigation ===
On May 28, 2012, the day after the match, FIVB president Wei Jizhong released statement:

The FIVB has investigated the allegation of match fixing. The conclusion of the FIVB control committee in place is that there is no evidence to prove the existence of match fixing. The reports received from the national federations of Japan and Serbia told us the same. Some witnesses in attendance at the match gave the same judgement.

The FIVB also said that it stood firmly against match fixing and would revise the system of future Olympics qualifiers to reduce even further the possibility of any manipulation.

=== Reaction ===
Some media were suspicious of the investigation result and said that something didn’t seem right. Thai social media sites were bombarded with messages expressing dissatisfaction over the judgement and a Japanese volleyball official insisted that allegations of match manipulation were unfounded.
