= Han Song-yi =

South Korean volleyball player (born 1984)

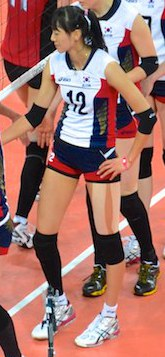
- Song-Yi after losing Bronze Medal to Japan

Personal information
- Nationality: South Korean
- Born: 5 September 1984 (age 42); Osan
- Height: 186 cm (6 ft 1 in)
- Weight: 67 kg (148 lb)
- Spike: 305 cm (120 in)
- Block: 298 cm (117 in)

Volleyball information
- Position: Outside spiker, middle blocker
- Current club: Daejeon KGC
- Number: 12

Career
Years	Teams
2002–2008	Gumi Korea Expressway EX
2008–2011	Incheon Heungkuk Life Pink Spiders
2011–2017	GS Caltex Seoul KIXX
2017–2024	Daejeon KGC

National team
2004 – 2014; 2020	South Korea

Korean name
- Hangul: 한송이
- Hanja: 韓송이
- RR: Han Songi
- MR: Han Songi
- Last updated: June 21, 2021

Han Song-yi (Korean: 한송이; born 5 September 1984) was a South Korean volleyball player.

== National team ==
She was part of the silver medal winning team at the 2010 Asian Games and also competed for South Korea at the 2012 Summer Olympics. She was part of the South Korea women's national volleyball team at the 2010 FIVB Volleyball Women's World Championship in Japan. She played with Heungkuk Life Insurance.

After being absent during six years, she was included in the National Team for the 2020 Tokyo Summer Olympics.
