= Heungkuk Life =

South Korean insurance company

Heungkuk Life Insurance Co, Ltd. (Korean: 흥국생명; established 1950) is a South Korean insurance company headquartered in Seoul, South Korea.

== Information ==
It is a part of Taekwang Group, Korea's 40th largest chaebol. It is an insurance company that deals with life, pensions, and children's insurance.

== See also ==
- Incheon Heungkuk Life Pink Spiders
- Economy of South Korea
