= Lim Hyo-sook =

South Korean volleyball player (born 1982)

Lim Hyo-Sook

Personal information
- Nationality: South Korean
- Born: 26 April 1982 (age 44)
- Height: 177 cm (70 in)
- Weight: 75 kg (165 lb)
- Spike: 278 cm (109 in)
- Block: 270 cm (106 in)

Volleyball information
- Number: 7 (national team)

National team
2008-2012	South Korea

Lim Hyo-sook (Korean: 임효숙; Hanja: 林孝淑; born 26 April 1982) is a South Korean volleyball player. She was part of the team at the 2012 Summer Olympics.
