= Han Yoo-mi =

South Korean volleyball player (born 1982)

Han Yoo-Mi
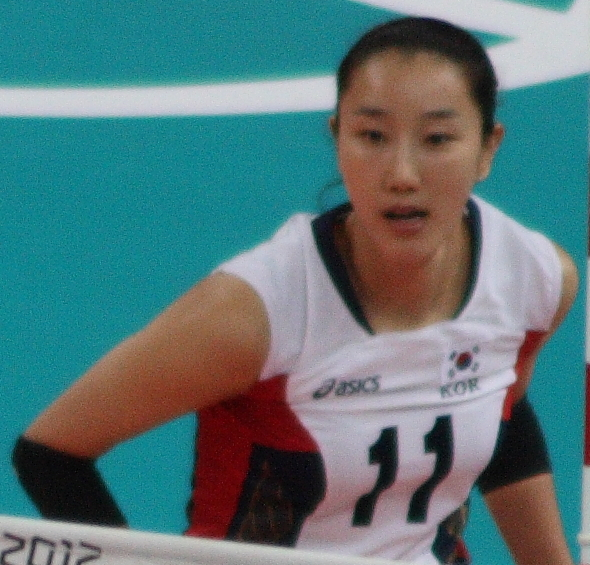
- Han Yoo-mi at the 2012 Summer Olympics

Personal information
- Nationality: South Korean
- Born: 5 February 1982 (age 44)
- Height: 180 cm (5 ft 11 in)
- Weight: 65 kg (143 lb)
- Spike: 307 cm (121 in)
- Block: 297 cm (117 in)

Volleyball information
- Number: 11

Career
Years	Teams
2010	Korea Volleyball Association

National team
2010	South Korea

Han Yoo-mi (Korean: 한유미; Hanja: 韓有美; born 5 February 1982) is a South Korean volleyball player. She was part of the silver medal-winning team at the 2010 Asian Games. She was also part of the South Korean team that came fourth at the 2012 Summer Olympics. She was part of the South Korea women's national volleyball team at the 2010 FIVB Volleyball Women's World Championship in Japan. She played with Korea Volleyball Association.

== Awards and nominations ==
Name of the award ceremony, year presented, category, nominee of the award, and the result of the nomination
Award ceremony	Year	Category	Nominee / Work	Result	Ref.
Korea First Brand Award	2022	Sports Entertainer	Han Yoo-mi	Won	
