= Incheon Heungkuk Life Pink Spiders =

South Korean women's volleyball club

Incheon Heungkuk Life Pink Spiders 인천 흥국생명 핑크스파이더스
- Full name: Incheon Heungkuk Life Insurance Pink Spiders Women's Volleyball Team 인천 흥국생명 핑크스파이더스 여자 배구단
- Founded: 1971; 55 years ago
- Ground: Samsan World Gymnasium; Incheon, South Korea (Capacity: 7,140)
- Owner: Heungkuk Life
- Chairman: Byun Jong-yoon
- Manager: Marcello Abbondanza
- Captain: Kim Su-ji
- League: V-League
- 2025−26: Regular season: 4th Postseason: Semi-playoff
- Website: Club home page

Uniforms
Home	Away

Incheon Heungkuk Life Insurance Pink Spiders (Korean: 인천 흥국생명 핑크스파이더스) is a South Korean women's professional volleyball team. The team was founded in 1971 and became fully professional in 2005. They are based in Incheon and are members of the Korea Volleyball Federation (KOVO). Their home arena is Samsan World Gymnasium in Incheon.

== Honours ==
- V-League

Champions (5): 2005−06, 2006−07, 2008−09, 2018–19, 2024–25
Runners-up (6): 2007−08, 2010−11, 2016–17, 2020–21, 2022–23, 2023–24

- KOVO Cup

Winners (1): 2010
Runners-up (1): 2020

== Season-by-season records ==
V-League record
League	Season	Postseason	Regular season				
League	Season	Postseason	Rank	Games	Won	Lost	Points
V-League	2005	Did not qualify	5	16	3	13	—
V-League	2005–06	Champions	1	28	17	11	—
V-League	2006–07	Champions	1	24	20	4	—
V-League	2007–08	Runners-up	2	28	24	4	—
V-League	2008–09	Champions	1	28	16	12	—
V-League	2009–10	Did not qualify	4	28	8	20	—
V-League	2010–11	Runners-up	2	24	13	11	—
V-League	2011–12	Did not qualify	5	30	13	17	41
V-League	2012–13	Did not qualify	5	30	6	24	22
V-League	2013–14	Did not qualify	6	30	7	23	19
V-League	2014–15	Did not qualify	4	30	15	15	45
V-League	2015–16	Playoff	2	30	18	12	48
V-League	2016–17	Runners-up	1	30	20	10	59
V-League	2017–18	Did not qualify	6	30	8	22	26
V-League	2018–19	Champions	1	30	21	9	62
V-League	2019–20	Cancelled	3	27	14	13	48
V-League	2020–21	Runners-up	2	30	19	11	56
V-League	2021–22	Cancelled	6	33	10	23	31
V-League	2022–23	Runners-up	1	36	27	9	82
V-League	2023–24	Runners-up	2	36	28	8	79
V-League	2024–25	Champions	1	36	27	9	81
V-League	2025–26	Semi-playoff	4	36	19	17	57

== Players ==
=== 2023−24 team ===
Number	Name	Birthdate	Height (cm)	Position
1	(South Korea) Kim Da-eun	January 25, 2001 (age 25)	180	Outside hitter
2	(South Korea) Hong Da-bi	September 8, 2005 (age 20)	162	Libero
3	(South Korea) Park Hye-jin	April 15, 2002 (age 24)	177	Setter
4	(South Korea) Lee Joo-ah	August 21, 2000 (age 25)	185	Middle blocker
5	(South Korea) Kim Hae-ran	March 16, 1984 (age 42)	168	Libero
6	(South Korea) Pyeon Ji-su	March 1, 1997 (age 29)	180	Middle blocker
7	(South Korea) Kim Na-hee	February 17, 1989 (age 37)	178	Middle blocker
8	(South Korea) Do Soo-bin	June 21, 1998 (age 27)	165	Libero
9	(South Korea) Park Eun-seo	September 4, 2000 (age 25)	173	Setter
10	(South Korea) Kim Yeon-koung	February 26, 1988 (age 38)	192	Outside hitter
11	(South Korea) Kim Su-ji	June 20, 1987 (age 38)	188	Middle blocker
12	(South Korea) Jeong Yun-ju	April 14, 2003 (age 23)	176	Outside hitter
14	(South Korea) Park Hyeon-ju	June 25, 2001 (age 24)	176	Opposite
15	(South Korea) Kim Chae-yeon	December 11, 1999 (age 26)	184	Middle blocker
16	(South Korea) Yang Tae-won	February 7, 2005 (age 21)	181	Outside hitter
17	(Japan) Reina Tokoku	April 28, 1999 (age 27)	177	Outside hitter
18	(South Korea) Kim Da-sol	April 14, 1997 (age 29)	173	Setter
19	(South Korea) Kim Mi-yeon	March 5, 1993 (age 33)	177	Outside hitter
20	(South Korea) Park Su-yeon	April 17, 2003 (age 23)	176	Libero
21	(South Korea) Seo Chae-hyeon	January 26, 2006 (age 20)	174	Setter
23	(South Korea) Lee Won-jeong	January 12, 2000 (age 26)	176	Setter
51	(United States) Willow Johnson	April 23, 1998 (age 28)	191	Opposite

Manager: (Italy) Marcello Abbondanza
