= Volleyball at the 2012 Summer Olympics – Women's tournament =

Women's volleyball at the Games of the XXX Olympiad
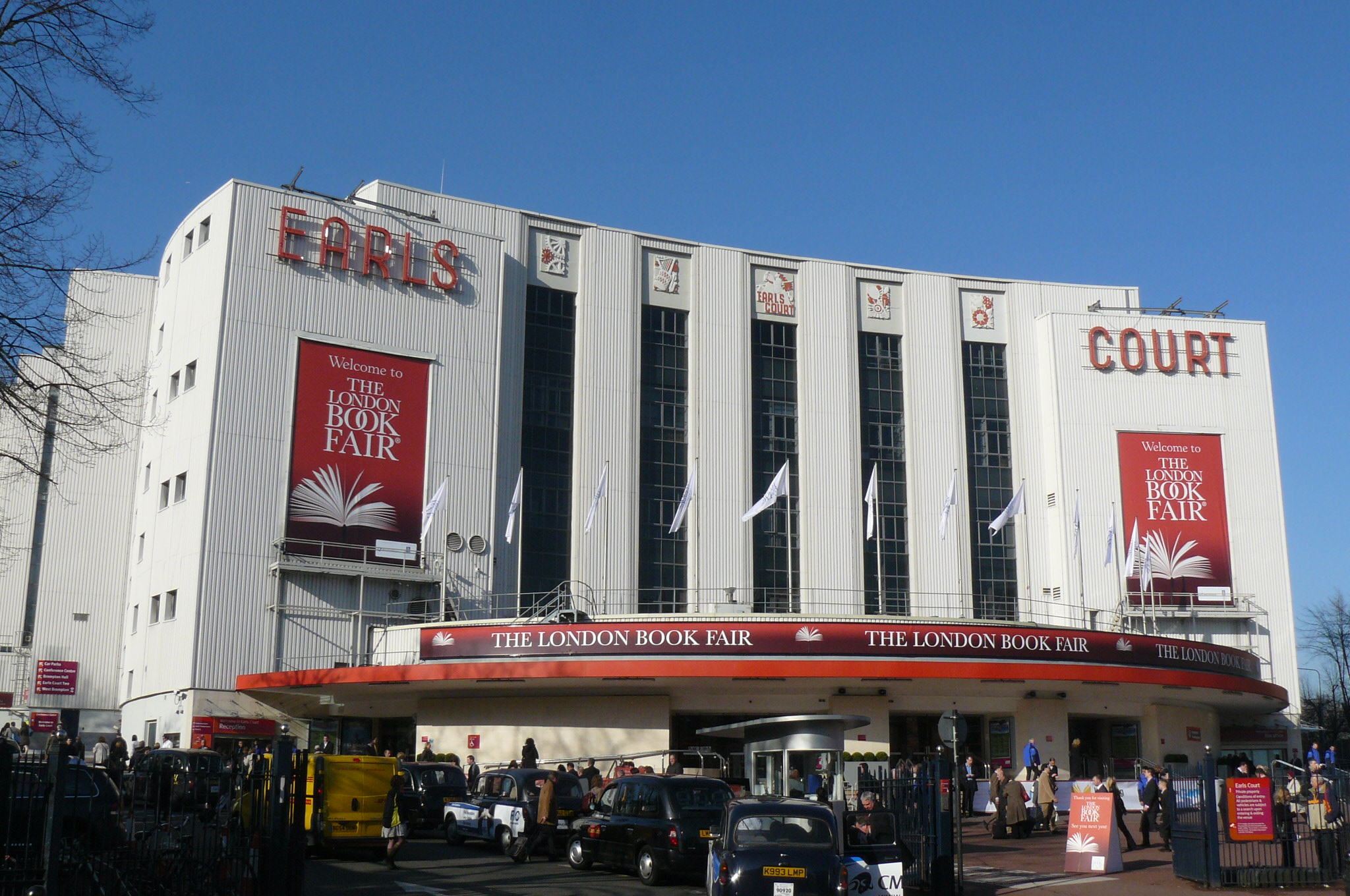
- Earls Court Exhibition Centre
- Venue: Earls Court Exhibition Centre
- Date: 28 July – 11 August
- Competitors: 144 from 12 nations

Medalists
1st place, gold medalist(s)		Brazil (2nd title)
2nd place, silver medalist(s)		United States
3rd place, bronze medalist(s)		Japan

The women's tournament in volleyball at the 2012 Summer Olympics in London was the 13th edition of the event in an Olympic Games, organised by the world's governing body, the FIVB, in conjunction with the IOC. It was held at Earls Court Exhibition Centre from 28 July to 11 August 2012.

== Qualification ==
Means of qualification	Date	Host	Vacancies	Qualified
Host country	—	—	1	Great Britain
2011 World Cup	4–18 November 2011	Japan	3	Italy
2011 World Cup	4–18 November 2011	Japan	3	United States
2011 World Cup	4–18 November 2011	Japan	3	China
African Qualifier	2–4 February 2012	(Algeria) Blida	1	Algeria
North American Qualifier	29 Apr–5 May 2012	(Mexico) Tijuana	1	Dominican Republic
European Qualifier	1–6 May 2012	(Turkey) Ankara	1	Turkey
South American Qualifier	9–13 May 2012	(Brazil) São Carlos	1	Brazil
World Qualifier	19–27 May 2012	(Japan) Tokyo	3	Russia
World Qualifier	19–27 May 2012	(Japan) Tokyo	3	South Korea
World Qualifier	19–27 May 2012	(Japan) Tokyo	3	Serbia
Asian Qualifier	19–27 May 2012	(Japan) Tokyo	1	Japan
Total			12	

- The Asian Qualification Tournament was combined with the World Qualification Tournament. The first 3 place teams of the tournament won the Olympic spots as the winners of the World Qualification Tournament while the best Asian team except the top 3 winners qualify as the Asian Qualification Tournament winners.

== Pools composition ==
Teams were seeded following the Serpentine system according to their ranking as of 15 January 2012.

Twelve qualified nations were drawn into two groups, each consisting of six teams. After a robin-round, the four highest-placed teams in each group advanced to a knock-out round to decide the medals.

Group A	Group B
Great Britain (Hosts)	United States (1)
Japan (3)	Brazil (2)
Italy (4)	China (5)
Russia (7)	Serbia (6)
Dominican Republic (9)	Turkey (11)
Algeria (16)	South Korea (13)

== Preliminary round ==
Teams played a round-robin schedule within the pool and those with the top four point totals advanced to a knockout round. Teams were awarded three points for a 3–0 or 3–1 win, two points for a 3–2 win, one point for a 3–2 loss, and zero points for a 3–0 or 3–1 loss. If at the end of pool play teams are tied the tiebreakers are (1) most wins, (2) set win ratio, (3) points ratio, and (4) head-to-head. If three or more teams are tied, the tiebreakers are applied only to the matches between tied teams.

- All times are British Summer Time (UTC+01:00).

=== Pool A ===
Pos	Team	Pld	W	L	Pts	SW	SL	SR	SPW	SPL	SPR	Qualification
1	Russia	5	5	0	14	15	4	3.750	459	352	1.304	Quarter-finals
2	Italy	5	4	1	13	14	5	2.800	442	368	1.201	Quarter-finals
3	Japan	5	3	2	9	11	6	1.833	401	335	1.197	Quarter-finals
4	Dominican Republic	5	2	3	6	8	9	0.889	374	362	1.033	Quarter-finals
5	Great Britain	5	1	4	2	3	14	0.214	295	396	0.745	
6	Algeria	5	0	5	1	2	15	0.133	252	410	0.615	

28 July 2012; 09:30	Algeria	0–3	Japan	Earls Court Exhibition Centre, London; Attendance: 13,000; Referees: Karin Zahorcova (CZE), José Vélez (PUR)
28 July 2012; 09:30	(15–25, 14–25, 7–25) result statistics			Earls Court Exhibition Centre, London; Attendance: 13,000; Referees: Karin Zahorcova (CZE), José Vélez (PUR)

28 July 2012; 14:45	Great Britain	0–3	Russia	Earls Court Exhibition Centre, London; Attendance: 15,000; Referees: Patricia Salvatore (USA), Rogério Espicalski (BRA)
28 July 2012; 14:45	(19–25, 10–25, 16–25) result statistics			Earls Court Exhibition Centre, London; Attendance: 15,000; Referees: Patricia Salvatore (USA), Rogério Espicalski (BRA)

28 July 2012; 16:45	Italy	3–1	Dominican Republic	Earls Court Exhibition Centre, London; Attendance: 14,000; Referees: Zorica Bjelić (SRB), Rolando Cholakian (ARG)
28 July 2012; 16:45	(25–17, 23–25, 25–19, 25–15) report statistics			Earls Court Exhibition Centre, London; Attendance: 14,000; Referees: Zorica Bjelić (SRB), Rolando Cholakian (ARG)

30 July 2012; 14:45	Dominican Republic	1–3	Russia	Earls Court Exhibition Centre, London; Attendance: 14,800; Referees: Rogerio Espicalsky (BRA), Karin Zahorcova (CZE)
30 July 2012; 14:45	(23–25, 15–25, 26–24, 22–25) report statistics			Earls Court Exhibition Centre, London; Attendance: 14,800; Referees: Rogerio Espicalsky (BRA), Karin Zahorcova (CZE)

30 July 2012; 20:00	Italy	3–1	Japan	Earls Court Exhibition Centre, London; Attendance: 13,000; Referees: Jose Mercado (PUR), Patricia Salvatore (USA)
30 July 2012; 20:00	(25–22, 25–21, 20–25, 25–22) result statistics			Earls Court Exhibition Centre, London; Attendance: 13,000; Referees: Jose Mercado (PUR), Patricia Salvatore (USA)

30 July 2012; 22:00	Great Britain	3–2	Algeria	Earls Court Exhibition Centre, London; Attendance: 14,000; Referees: Mitchell Davidson (CAN), Janpen Jirakakul (THA)
30 July 2012; 22:00	(22–25, 25–19, 23–25, 25–19, 15–8) result statistics			Earls Court Exhibition Centre, London; Attendance: 14,000; Referees: Mitchell Davidson (CAN), Janpen Jirakakul (THA)

1 August 2012; 09:30	Dominican Republic	0–3	Japan	Earls Court Exhibition Centre, London; Attendance: 9,000; Referees: Karin Zahorcova (CZE), Georgios Karampetsos (GRE)
1 August 2012; 09:30	(20–25, 19–25, 23–25) result statistics			Earls Court Exhibition Centre, London; Attendance: 9,000; Referees: Karin Zahorcova (CZE), Georgios Karampetsos (GRE)

1 August 2012; 11:30	Algeria	0–3	Russia	Earls Court Exhibition Centre, London; Attendance: 9,000; Referees: Janpen Jirakakul (THA), Brian McDougall (GBR)
1 August 2012; 11:30	(7–25, 14–25, 15–25) result statistics			Earls Court Exhibition Centre, London; Attendance: 9,000; Referees: Janpen Jirakakul (THA), Brian McDougall (GBR)

1 August 2012; 16:45	Great Britain	0–3	Italy	Earls Court Exhibition Centre, London; Attendance: 11,800; Referees: Zorica Bjelić (SRB), Denny Lassi (DOM)
1 August 2012; 16:45	(25–27, 12–25, 12–25) result statistics			Earls Court Exhibition Centre, London; Attendance: 11,800; Referees: Zorica Bjelić (SRB), Denny Lassi (DOM)

3 August 2012; 11:30	Japan	1–3	Russia	Earls Court Exhibition Centre, London; Attendance: 10,000; Referees: Jose Mercado (PUR), Zorica Bjelić (SRB)
3 August 2012; 11:30	(25–27, 17–25, 25–20, 19–25) result statistics			Earls Court Exhibition Centre, London; Attendance: 10,000; Referees: Jose Mercado (PUR), Zorica Bjelić (SRB)

3 August 2012; 16:45	Great Britain	0–3	Dominican Republic	Earls Court Exhibition Centre, London; Attendance: 14,000; Referees: Mohamad Shaaban (EGY), Janpen Jirakakul (THA)
3 August 2012; 16:45	(9–25, 18–25, 19–25) result statistics			Earls Court Exhibition Centre, London; Attendance: 14,000; Referees: Mohamad Shaaban (EGY), Janpen Jirakakul (THA)

3 August 2012; 22:00	Algeria	0–3	Italy	Earls Court Exhibition Centre, London; Attendance: 11,000; Referees: Patricia Salvatore (USA), Wang Ning (CHN)
3 August 2012; 22:00	(11–25, 12–25, 17–25) result statistics			Earls Court Exhibition Centre, London; Attendance: 11,000; Referees: Patricia Salvatore (USA), Wang Ning (CHN)

5 August 2012; 09:30	Algeria	0–3	Dominican Republic	Earls Court Exhibition Centre, London; Attendance: 11,000; Referees: Patricia Salvatore (USA), Brian McDougall (GBR)
5 August 2012; 09:30	(15–25, 16–25, 13–25) result statistics			Earls Court Exhibition Centre, London; Attendance: 11,000; Referees: Patricia Salvatore (USA), Brian McDougall (GBR)

5 August 2012; 14:45	Great Britain	0–3	Japan	Earls Court Exhibition Centre, London; Attendance: 14,000; Referees: Michael Davidson (CAN), Mohamed Shaaban (EGY)
5 August 2012; 14:45	(19–25, 14–25, 12–25) result statistics			Earls Court Exhibition Centre, London; Attendance: 14,000; Referees: Michael Davidson (CAN), Mohamed Shaaban (EGY)

5 August 2012; 16:45	Italy	2–3	Russia	Earls Court Exhibition Centre, London; Attendance: 10,000; Referees: Zorica Bjelić (SRB), Wang Ning (CHN)
5 August 2012; 16:45	(28–26, 19–25, 25–22, 16–25, 11–15) result statistics			Earls Court Exhibition Centre, London; Attendance: 10,000; Referees: Zorica Bjelić (SRB), Wang Ning (CHN)

=== Pool B ===
Pos	Team	Pld	W	L	Pts	SW	SL	SR	SPW	SPL	SPR	Qualification
1	United States	5	5	0	15	15	2	7.500	426	345	1.235	Quarter-finals
2	China	5	3	2	9	11	10	1.100	475	461	1.030	Quarter-finals
3	South Korea	5	2	3	8	11	10	1.100	449	452	0.993	Quarter-finals
4	Brazil	5	3	2	7	10	10	1.000	447	420	1.064	Quarter-finals
5	Turkey	5	2	3	6	9	11	0.818	434	443	0.980	
6	Serbia	5	0	5	0	2	15	0.133	297	407	0.730	

28 July 2012; 11:30	China	3–1	Serbia	Earls Court Exhibition Centre, London; Attendance: 13,000; Referees: Susana Rodríguez (ESP), Ibrahim Al-Naama (QAT)
28 July 2012; 11:30	(16–25, 25–18, 25–13, 25–12) result statistics			Earls Court Exhibition Centre, London; Attendance: 13,000; Referees: Susana Rodríguez (ESP), Ibrahim Al-Naama (QAT)

28 July 2012; 20:00	United States	3–1	South Korea	Earls Court Exhibition Centre, London; Attendance: 14,000; Referees: Janpen Jirakakul (THA), Georgios Karampetsos (GRE)
28 July 2012; 20:00	(25–19, 25–17, 20–25, 25–21) result statistics			Earls Court Exhibition Centre, London; Attendance: 14,000; Referees: Janpen Jirakakul (THA), Georgios Karampetsos (GRE)

28 July 2012; 22:00	Brazil	3–2	Turkey	Earls Court Exhibition Centre, London; Attendance: 8,000; Referees: Andrey Zenovich (RUS), Mitchell Davidson (CAN)
28 July 2012; 22:00	(25–18, 23–25, 25–19, 25–27, 15–12) result statistics			Earls Court Exhibition Centre, London; Attendance: 8,000; Referees: Andrey Zenovich (RUS), Mitchell Davidson (CAN)

30 July 2012; 09:30	China	3–1	Turkey	Earls Court Exhibition Centre, London; Attendance: 10,500; Referees: Frans Loderus (NED), Mohamed Shaaban (EGY)
30 July 2012; 09:30	(25–20, 25–20, 29–31, 25–22) result statistics			Earls Court Exhibition Centre, London; Attendance: 10,500; Referees: Frans Loderus (NED), Mohamed Shaaban (EGY)

30 July 2012; 11:30	Serbia	1–3	South Korea	Earls Court Exhibition Centre, London; Attendance: 7,500; Referees: Brian McDougall (GBR), Simone Santi (ITA)
30 July 2012; 11:30	(12–25, 16–25, 25–16, 21–25) result statistics			Earls Court Exhibition Centre, London; Attendance: 7,500; Referees: Brian McDougall (GBR), Simone Santi (ITA)

30 July 2012; 16:45	United States	3–1	Brazil	Earls Court Exhibition Centre, London; Attendance: 15,000; Referees: Akihiko Tano (JPN), Andrey Zenovich (RUS)
30 July 2012; 16:45	(25–18, 25–17, 22–25, 25–21) result statistics			Earls Court Exhibition Centre, London; Attendance: 15,000; Referees: Akihiko Tano (JPN), Andrey Zenovich (RUS)

1 August 2012; 14:45	Serbia	0–3	Turkey	Earls Court Exhibition Centre, London; Attendance: 11,500; Referees: Susana Rodriguez (ESP), Simone Santi (ITA)
1 August 2012; 14:45	(20–25, 12–25, 21–25) result statistics			Earls Court Exhibition Centre, London; Attendance: 11,500; Referees: Susana Rodriguez (ESP), Simone Santi (ITA)

1 August 2012; 20:00	United States	3–0	China	Earls Court Exhibition Centre, London; Attendance: 14,800; Referees: Rolando Cholakian (ARG), Jose Mercado (PUR)
1 August 2012; 20:00	(26–24, 25–16, 31–29) result statistics			Earls Court Exhibition Centre, London; Attendance: 14,800; Referees: Rolando Cholakian (ARG), Jose Mercado (PUR)

1 August 2012; 22:00	Brazil	0–3	South Korea	Earls Court Exhibition Centre, London; Attendance: 11,000; Referees: Mitchell Davidson (CAN), Mitchell Salvatore (USA)
1 August 2012; 22:00	(23–25, 21–25, 21–25) result statistics			Earls Court Exhibition Centre, London; Attendance: 11,000; Referees: Mitchell Davidson (CAN), Mitchell Salvatore (USA)

3 August 2012; 09:30	Brazil	3–2	China	Earls Court Exhibition Centre, London; Attendance: 11,000; Referees: Denny Lassi (DOM), Bela Hobor (HUN)
3 August 2012; 09:30	(25–16, 20–25, 25–18, 28–30, 15–10) result statistics			Earls Court Exhibition Centre, London; Attendance: 11,000; Referees: Denny Lassi (DOM), Bela Hobor (HUN)

3 August 2012; 14:45	Turkey	3–2	South Korea	Earls Court Exhibition Centre, London; Attendance: 13,500; Referees: Simone Santi (ITA), Brian McDougall (GBR)
3 August 2012; 14:45	(25–16, 21–25, 25–18, 19–25, 15–12) result statistics			Earls Court Exhibition Centre, London; Attendance: 13,500; Referees: Simone Santi (ITA), Brian McDougall (GBR)

3 August 2012; 20:00	United States	3–0	Serbia	Earls Court Exhibition Centre, London; Attendance: 9,000; Referees: Karin Zahorcova (CZE), Susana Rodriguez (ESP)
3 August 2012; 20:00	(25–17, 25–20, 25–16) result statistics			Earls Court Exhibition Centre, London; Attendance: 9,000; Referees: Karin Zahorcova (CZE), Susana Rodriguez (ESP)

5 August 2012; 11:30	China	3–2	South Korea	Earls Court Exhibition Centre, London; Attendance: 12,000; Referees: Janpen Jirakul (THA), Frans Loderus (NED)
5 August 2012; 11:30	(28–26, 22–25, 25–19, 22–25, 15–10) result statistics			Earls Court Exhibition Centre, London; Attendance: 12,000; Referees: Janpen Jirakul (THA), Frans Loderus (NED)

5 August 2012; 20:00	United States	3–0	Turkey	Earls Court Exhibition Centre, London; Attendance: 12,000; Referees: Susana Rodriguez (ESP), Ibrahim Al-Naama (QAT)
5 August 2012; 20:00	(27–25, 25–16, 25–19) result statistics			Earls Court Exhibition Centre, London; Attendance: 12,000; Referees: Susana Rodriguez (ESP), Ibrahim Al-Naama (QAT)

5 August 2012; 22:00	Brazil	3–0	Serbia	Earls Court Exhibition Centre, London; Attendance: 8,000; Referees: Karin Zahorcova (CZE), Akihiko Tano (JPN)
5 August 2012; 22:00	(25–10, 25–22, 25–16) result statistics			Earls Court Exhibition Centre, London; Attendance: 8,000; Referees: Karin Zahorcova (CZE), Akihiko Tano (JPN)

== Knockout stage ==
- All times are British Summer Time (UTC+01:00).

=== Bracket ===
Quarter-finals
7 August
Russia	2
Brazil	3
7 August
Japan	3
China	2
7 August
Italy	1
South Korea	3
7 August
United States	3
Dominican Republic	0

Semi-finals
9 August
Brazil	3
Japan	0
9 August
South Korea	0
United States	3

Gold medal match
11 August
Brazil	3
United States	1
Bronze medal match
11 August
Japan	3
South Korea	0

=== Quarterfinals ===
7 August 2012; 13:00	Japan	3–2	China	Earls Court Exhibition Centre, London; Attendance: 12,000; Referees: Susana Rodriguez (ESP), Zorica Bjelić (SRB)
7 August 2012; 13:00	(28–26, 23–25, 25–23, 23–25, 18–16) result statistics			Earls Court Exhibition Centre, London; Attendance: 12,000; Referees: Susana Rodriguez (ESP), Zorica Bjelić (SRB)

7 August 2012; 15:00	Russia	2–3	Brazil	Earls Court Exhibition Centre, London; Attendance: 11,500; Referees: Akihiko Tano (JPN), Ibrahim Al-Naama (QAT)
7 August 2012; 15:00	(26–24, 22–25, 25–19, 22–25, 19–21) result statistics			Earls Court Exhibition Centre, London; Attendance: 11,500; Referees: Akihiko Tano (JPN), Ibrahim Al-Naama (QAT)

7 August 2012; 19:00	United States	3–0	Dominican Republic	Earls Court Exhibition Centre, London; Attendance: 13,000; Referees: Karin Zahorcova (CZE), Jarpen Jirakakul (THA)
7 August 2012; 19:00	(25–14, 25–21, 25–22) result statistics			Earls Court Exhibition Centre, London; Attendance: 13,000; Referees: Karin Zahorcova (CZE), Jarpen Jirakakul (THA)

7 August 2012; 21:00	Italy	1–3	South Korea	Earls Court Exhibition Centre, London; Attendance: 13,000; Referees: Rolando Cholakian (ARG), Jose Mercado (PUR)
7 August 2012; 21:00	(25–18, 21–25, 20–25, 18–25) result statistics			Earls Court Exhibition Centre, London; Attendance: 13,000; Referees: Rolando Cholakian (ARG), Jose Mercado (PUR)

=== Semifinals ===
9 August 2012; 15:00	South Korea	0–3	United States	Earls Court Exhibition Centre, London; Attendance: 14,000; Referees: Rolando Cholakian (ARG), Brian McDougall (GBR)
9 August 2012; 15:00	(20–25, 22–25, 22–25) result statistics			Earls Court Exhibition Centre, London; Attendance: 14,000; Referees: Rolando Cholakian (ARG), Brian McDougall (GBR)

9 August 2012; 19:30	Brazil	3–0	Japan	Earls Court Exhibition Centre, London; Attendance: 13,500; Referees: Simone Santi (ITA), Mohamed Shaaban (EGY)
9 August 2012; 19:30	(25–18, 25–15, 25–18) result statistics			Earls Court Exhibition Centre, London; Attendance: 13,500; Referees: Simone Santi (ITA), Mohamed Shaaban (EGY)

=== Bronze medal match ===
11 August 2012; 11:30	(bronze) Japan	3–0	South Korea	Earls Court Exhibition Centre, London; Attendance: 13,500; Referees: Suzana Rodriguez (ESP), Jose Mercado (PUR)
11 August 2012; 11:30	(25–22, 26–24, 25–21) result statistics			Earls Court Exhibition Centre, London; Attendance: 13,500; Referees: Suzana Rodriguez (ESP), Jose Mercado (PUR)

=== Final ===
11 August 2012; 18:30	(gold) Brazil	3–1	United States (silver)	Earls Court Exhibition Centre, London; Attendance: 13,500; Referees: Andrey Zenovich (RUS), Zorica Bjelić (SRB)
11 August 2012; 18:30	(11–25, 25–17, 25–20, 25–17) result statistics			Earls Court Exhibition Centre, London; Attendance: 13,500; Referees: Andrey Zenovich (RUS), Zorica Bjelić (SRB)

== Statistics leaders ==
- Only players whose teams advanced to the quarterfinals are ranked.

Best Scorers
Rank	Name	Points
1	(South Korea) Kim Yeon-koung	207
2	(United States) Destinee Hooker	161
3	(Japan) Saori Kimura	142
4	(Brazil) Sheilla Castro	140
5	(Russia) Ekaterina Gamova	124

Best Spikers
Rank	Name	%Eff
1	(United States) Destinee Hooker	37.93
2	(Italy) Simona Gioli	37.78
3	(South Korea) Kim Yeon-koung	35.57
4	(Russia) Nataliya Goncharova	34.22
5	(Russia) Ekaterina Gamova	33.04

Best Blockers
Rank	Name	Avg
1	(Brazil) Fabiana Claudino	0.94
2	(United States) Foluke Akinradewo	0.93
3	(Italy) Simona Gioli	0.91
4	(United States) Destinee Hooker	0.78
5	(Brazil) Thaísa Menezes	0.75

Best Servers
Rank	Name	Avg
1	(Brazil) Sheilla Castro	0.31
2	(China) Hui Ruoqi	0.31
3	(Italy) Lucia Bosetti	0.30
4	(Russia) Ekaterina Gamova	0.29
5	(Italy) Antonella Del Core	0.26

Best Diggers
Rank	Name	Avg
1	(Dominican Republic) Brenda Castillo	6.10
2	(China) Zhang Xian	4.77
3	(Japan) Yuko Sano	4.11
4	(South Korea) Kim Hae-ran	3.90
5	(Japan) Yoshie Takeshita	3.64

Best Setters
Rank	Name	Avg
1	(Russia) Yevgeniya Startseva	12.79
2	(China) Wei Qiuyue	12.08
3	(Japan) Yoshie Takeshita	11.82
4	(United States) Lindsey Berg	9.74
5	(Brazil) Danielle Lins	9.72

Best Receivers
Rank	Name	%Succ
1	(Brazil) Fernanda Garay	81.32
2	(Russia) Svetlana Kryuchkova	80.00
3	(Italy) Paola Croce	77.88
4	(Italy) Antonella Del Core	77.03
5	(United States) Nicole Davis	74.27

== Final standings ==
Rank	Team
1st place, gold medalist(s)	Brazil
2nd place, silver medalist(s)	United States
3rd place, bronze medalist(s)	Japan
4	South Korea
5	China
5	Dominican Republic
5	Italy
5	Russia
9	Great Britain
9	Turkey
11	Algeria
11	Serbia

2012 Women's Olympic champions

Brazil
2nd title

12-woman roster
Fabiana Claudino (c), Dani Lins, Paula Pequeno, Adenízia da Silva, Thaísa Menezes, Jaqueline Carvalho, Fernanda Ferreira, Tandara Caixeta, Natália Pereira, Sheilla Castro, Fabi Alvim (L), Fernanda Garay
Head coach
Zé Roberto

== Medalists ==
Gold	Silver	Bronze
Brazil Fabiana Claudino (c); Dani Lins; Paula Pequeno; Adenízia da Silva; Thaísa Menezes; Jaqueline Carvalho; Fernanda Ferreira; Tandara Caixeta; Natália Pereira; Sheilla Castro; Fabiana de Oliveira (L); Fernanda Garay Head coach: Zé Roberto	United States Danielle Scott-Arruda; Tayyiba Haneef-Park; Lindsey Berg (c); Tamari Miyashiro; Nicole Davis (L); Jordan Larson; Megan Hodge; Christa Harmotto; Logan Tom; Foluke Akinradewo; Courtney Thompson; Destinee Hooker Head coach: Hugh McCutcheon	Japan Hitomi Nakamichi; Yoshie Takeshita; Mai Yamaguchi; Erika Araki (c); Kaori Inoue; Maiko Kano; Yuko Sano (L); Ai Otomo; Risa Shinnabe; Saori Sakoda; Yukiko Ebata; Saori Kimura Head coach: Masayoshi Manabe

== Individual awards ==
- Most valuable player

Kim Yeon-koung (KOR)

- Best scorer
  Kim Yeon-koung (KOR)
- Best spiker
  Destinee Hooker (USA)
- Best blocker
  Fabiana Claudino (BRA)
- Best server
  Sheilla Castro (BRA)
- Best setter
  Yevgeniya Startseva (RUS)
- Best receiver
  Fernanda Garay (BRA)
- Best libero
  Brenda Castillo (DOM)

== See also ==
- Volleyball at the 2012 Summer Olympics – Men's tournament
