= Hwang Youn-joo =

South Korean volleyball player (born 1986)

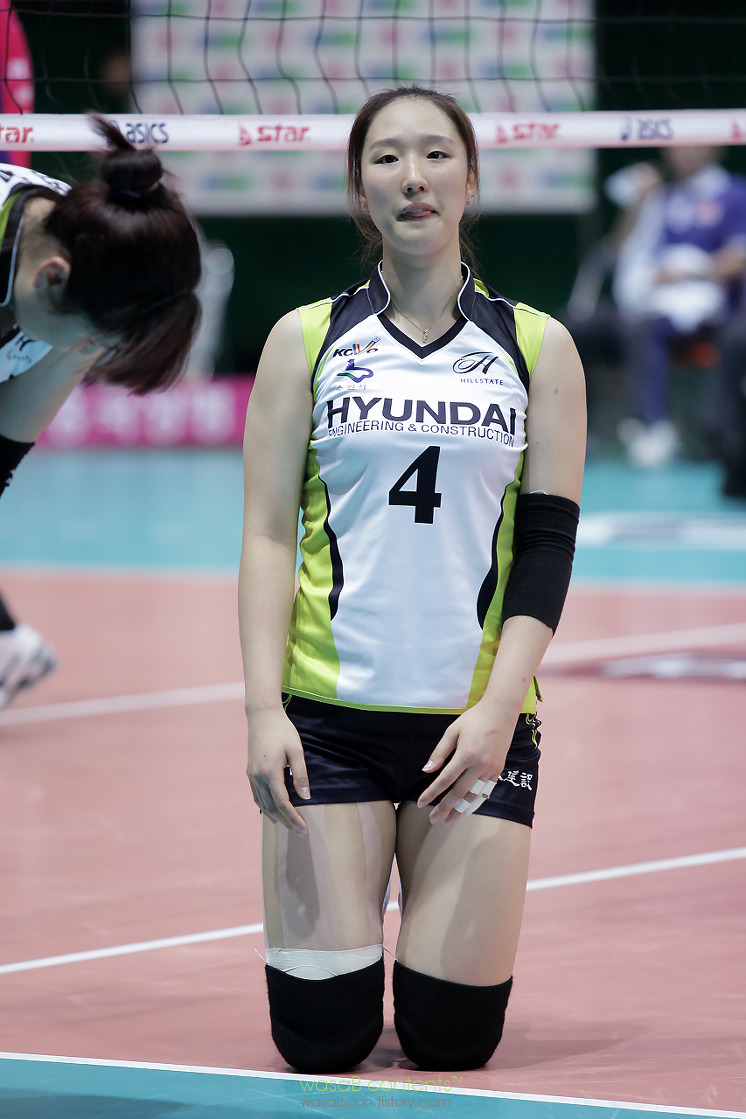

Personal information
- Nationality: South Korean
- Born: 13 August 1986 (age 40); Bucheon, Gyeonggi, South Korea
- Height: 177 cm (5 ft 10 in)
- Weight: 68 kg (150 lb)
- Spike: 303 cm (119 in)
- Block: 294 cm (116 in)
- Education: Kyonggi University

Volleyball information
- Position: Opposite Spiker

Career
Years	Teams
2005–2010; 2010-2025; 2025-2026	Cheonan Heungkuk Life Pink Spiders; Suwon Hyundai Engineering & Construction Hillstate; Korea Expressway Corporation Hi-Pass

National team
2005 – 2016	South Korea

Korean name
- Hangul: 황연주
- Hanja: 黃連珠
- RR: Hwang Yeonju
- MR: Hwang Yŏnju

Hwang Youn-joo (Korean: 황연주; born 13 August 1986) is a South Korean volleyball player.

She was part of the silver medal winning team at the 2010 Asian Games. She was also part of the South Korea women's national volleyball team at the 2010 FIVB Volleyball Women's World Championship, and 2011 FIVB Volleyball Women's World Cup. She participated in the 2012 Summer Olympics, when the South Korean team finished 4th after losing the bronze medal match 0-3 to Japan, and the 2016 Summer Olympics, when they finished 5th.

At club level, she has played for Suwon Hyundai Engineering & Construction Hillstate since 2010. Prior to that, she had been with Incheon Heungkuk Life Pink Spiders since 2005, who were initially based in Cheonan.

== Early life and education ==
The oldest child in a family with a brother and a sister, Yeonju first received her education at Sosa Elementary School in her hometown of Bucheon, Wongok Middle School in Ansan, and Hanil Jeonsan High School in Suwon, now known as Hanbom High School. Upon graduation from high school in 2005, she was selected as the second pick in the first-round draft by the Heungkuk Life team.

Later on, Yeonju also studied at the Department of Sports Management in Kyonggi University.
