= Jung Dae-young =

South Korean volleyball player (born 1981)

Jung Dae-Young

Personal information
- Nationality: South Korean
- Born: 12 August 1981 (age 45); Cheongju, Chungcheongbuk-do, South Korea
- Height: 183 cm (6 ft 0 in)
- Weight: 71 kg (157 lb)
- Spike: 303 cm (119 in)
- Block: 292 cm (115 in)
- Education: Myongji University

Volleyball information
- Position: Centre
- Current club: Gimcheon Korea Expressway Hi-pass
- Number: 13

National team
2001–2019	South Korea

Jung Dae-young (Korean: 정대영; Hanja: 鄭大永; born 12 August 1981) is a South Korean volleyball player. She was part of the South Korea women's national volleyball team.

She participated at the 2001 FIVB World Grand Prix, and at the 2010 FIVB Volleyball Women's World Championship in Japan.

She was part of the silver medal winning team at the 2010 Asian Games.

She has twice represented South Korea at the Summer Olympics, being part of the teams that finished in 5th in 2004 and 4th in 2012.

== Club career ==
- Played with Suwon Hyundai Engineering & Construction Hillstate (1999-2007)
- Played with GS Caltex Seoul KIXX (2007-2014)
- Played with Gimcheon Korea Expressway Hi-pass (2014-)
