= Kim Min-ji (volleyball) =

South Korean volleyball player (born 1985)

Personal information
- Nationality: South Korean
- Born: 25 May 1985 (age 41); Seoul, South Korea
- Height: 187 cm (6 ft 2 in)
- Weight: 75 kg (165 lb)
- Spike: 304 cm (120 in)
- Block: 296 cm (117 in)

Volleyball information
- Position: Opposite Spiker
- Number: 1

National team
South Korea
Honours
Asian Cup
Silver medal – second place	2008 Nakhon Ratchasima

Kim Min-ji (Korean: 김민지; Hanja: 金敏智; born 25 May 1985) is a retired South Korean female professional volleyball player.

She was part of the team at the 2011 FIVB Volleyball Women's World Cup.

== Clubs ==
- GS Caltex (2003-2012)
