= Sangmu Volleyball Team =

South Korean volleyball club

Sangmu Shinhyup 상무신협
- Full name: Sangmu Shinhyup Volleyball Team 상무신협 배구단
- Nickname: Bulsajo (Phoenix)
- Founded: 1951
- Chairman: (South Korea) Kwak Hap
- Manager: (South Korea) Park Sam-ryong
- Website: Club home page

Uniforms
Home	Away

Sangmu Shinhyup (Korean: 상무신협) is a South Korean volleyball team founded in 1951. They played in the V-League (2005–2012) and their home stadium was Seongnam Gymnasium in Seongnam.

== Club honours ==
- Club World Championship
  - 5th place (1): 1992
- Asian Club Championship
  - 6th place (1): 2015

== Notable players ==
- (South Korea) Shin Young-chul
- (South Korea) Shin Yung-suk

== See also ==
- Korea Armed Forces Athletic Corps
