= 2022–23 V-League (South Korea) =

South Korean volleyball league

- League: V-League
- Sport: Volleyball
- Duration: 22 October 2022 – 7 April 2023
- Games: 209
- Teams: M: 7; W: 7

Regular season (Men's)
- Top seed: Incheon Korean Air Jumbos
- Top scorer: (Cuba) Leonardo Leyva (Ansan OK)

Regular season (Women's)
- Top seed: Incheon Heungkuk Pink Spiders
- Top scorer: (Romania) Elizabet Inneh (Daejeon KGC)

Finals
- Champions: M: Incheon Korean Air Jumbos; W: Gimcheon Korea Expressway Corporation Hi-pass
- Runners-up: M: Cheonan Hyundai Capital Skywalkers; W: Incheon Heungkuk Pink Spiders
- Finals MVP: M: (South Korea) Han Sun-soo; W: (United States) Khat Bell

V-League seasons
- ← 2021–22 2023–24 →

The 2022–23 V-League season is the 19th season of the V-League, the highest professional volleyball league in South Korea. The season run from 22 October 2022 to 7 April 2023.

== Teams ==
=== Men's clubs ===
Location of teams in V-League Men's Clubs

Team	Location	Stadium	Capacity
Ansan OK Financial Group Okman	Ansan	Sangnoksu Gymnasium	2,700
Cheonan Hyundai Capital Skywalkers	Cheonan	Yu Gwan-sun Gymnasium	5,482
Daejeon Samsung Bluefangs	Daejeon	Chungmu Gymnasium	5,000
Uijeongbu KB Insurance Stars	Uijeongbu	Uijeongbu Gymnasium	6,240
Incheon Korean Air Jumbos	Incheon	Gyeyang Gymnasium	4,270
Seoul Woori Card Wibee	Seoul	Jangchung Gymnasium	4,507
Suwon KEPCO Vixtorm	Suwon	Suwon Gymnasium	4,317

=== Women's clubs ===
Location of teams in V-League Women's Clubs

Team	Location	Stadium	Capacity
Daejeon KGC	Daejeon	Chungmu Gymnasium	5,000
Gimcheon Korea Expressway Hi-pass	Gimcheon	Gimcheon Gymnasium	6,000
GS Caltex Seoul KIXX	Seoul	Jangchung Gymnasium	4,507
Hwaseong IBK Altos	Hwaseong	Hwaseong Gymnasium	5,158
Incheon Heungkuk Life Pink Spiders	Incheon	Samsan World Gymnasium	7,140
Suwon Hyundai E&C Hillstate	Suwon	Suwon Gymnasium	4,317
Gwangju AI Peppers	Gwangju	Yeomju Gymnasium	8,500

== Season standing procedure ==
1. Match won 3–0 or 3–1: 3 points for the winner, 0 points for the loser.
2. Match won 3–2: 2 points for the winner, 1 point for the loser.
3. Standings – Points, matches won, Sets ratio, Points ratio, then Result of the last match between the tied teams
4. If the 4th-placed team finishes within three points of the 3rd placed team, an extra league game is played between these two teams.

== Regular season ==
- If the fourth ranked team finishes within three points of the third ranked team, a semi playoff will be held between the two teams to decide who advances to the playoff game.

=== League table (Men's) ===
Pos	Team	Pld	W	L	Pts	SR	SPR	Qualification
1	Incheon Korean Air Jumbos	36	26	10	76	1.833	1.083	Championship
2	Cheonan Hyundai Skywalkers	36	22	14	67	1.351	1.040	Playoff
3	Seoul Woori Card Wibee	36	19	17	56	1.000	1.021	Playoff
4	Suwon KEPCO Vixtorm	36	17	19	53	1.014	1.012	
5	Ansan OKman	36	16	20	48	0.838	0.954	
6	Uijeongbu KB Insurance Stars	36	15	21	42	0.734	0.946	
7	Daejeon Samsung Bluefangs	36	11	25	33	0.671	0.952	

Source: League table (Men's)

=== League table (Women's) ===
Pos	Team	Pld	W	L	Pts	SR	SPR	Qualification
1	Incheon Heungkuk Pink Spiders	36	27	9	82	2.114	1.109	Championship
2	Suwon Hyundai Hillstate	36	24	12	70	1.554	1.079	Playoff
3	Gimcheon Hi-pass	36	20	16	60	1.149	1.015	Playoff
4	Daejeon KGC	36	19	17	56	1.000	1.009	
5	GS Caltex Seoul KIXX	36	16	20	48	0.880	0.996	
6	Hwaseong IBK Altos	36	15	21	48	0.803	0.972	
7	Gwangju AI Peppers	36	5	31	14	0.347	0.835	

Source: League table (Women's)

=== Results / Fixtures – Men ===
==== Rounds 1 and 2 ====
Home \ Away	INC	CHN	ANS	DEJ	SEL	UJB	SUW
Incheon Korean Air Jumbos		3–0	2–3	3–0	3–0	3–1	3–2
Cheonan Hyundai Skywalkers	0–3		0–3	3–0	3–1	3–1	2–3
Ansan OKman	1–3	2–3		3–2	0–3	3–0	0–3
Daejeon Samsung Bluefangs	0–3	1–3	1–3		2–3	3–2	2–3
Seoul Woori Card Wibee	3–2	0–3	3–1	3–1		0–3	3–2
Uijeongbu KB Insurance Stars	0–3	0–3	3–2	0–3	1–3		3–1
Suwon KEPCO Vixtorm	0–3	0–3	1–3	3–0	3–1	3–0	

Source: Round 1 & Round 2
Legend: Blue = home team win; Red = away team win.

==== Rounds 3 and 4 ====
Home \ Away	INC	CHN	ANS	DEJ	SEL	UJB	SUW
Incheon Korean Air Jumbos		3–2	3–0	3–2	3–0	3–0	3–2
Cheonan Hyundai Skywalkers	1–3		1–3	3–1	3–1	3–1	1–3
Ansan OKman	3–0	0–3		3–0	1–3	3–1	3–1
Daejeon Samsung Bluefangs	1–3	0–3	3–1		3–2	1–3	3–2
Seoul Woori Card Wibee	3–2	3–1	3–2	3–1		3–0	2–3
Uijeongbu KB Insurance Stars	3–0	0–3	1–3	3–1	3–0		3–1
Suwon KEPCO Vixtorm	2–3	1–3	3–0	2–3*	2–3	3–2	

Source: Round 3 & Round 4
Legend: Blue = home team win; Red = away team win.

* game played at away team's ground

==== Rounds 5 and 6 ====
Home \ Away	INC	CHN	ANS	DEJ	SEL	UJB	SUW
Incheon Korean Air Jumbos		3–0	3–0	2–3	3–2	3–1	1–3
Cheonan Hyundai Skywalkers	3–1		3–1	3–2	3–0	2–3	0–3
Ansan OKman	0–3	3–0		3–0	3–2	2–3	3–2
Daejeon Samsung Bluefangs	3–0	1–3	3–0		2–3	1–3	2–3*
Seoul Woori Card Wibee	3–0	0–3	3–0	0–3		2–3	3–0
Uijeongbu KB Insurance Stars	0–3	1–3	3–0	0–3	1–3		3–2
Suwon KEPCO Vixtorm	1–3	3–1	3–1	3–0	3–2	1–3	

Source: Round 5 & Round 6
Legend: Blue = home team win; Red = away team win.

* game played at away team's ground

=== Results / Fixtures – Women ===
==== Rounds 1 and 2 ====
Home \ Away	SEL	DEJ	HWA	INC	GIM	SUW	GWA
GS Caltex Seoul KIXX		0–3	1–3	0–3	0–3	2–3	3–1
Daejeon KGC	1–3		0–3	0–3	1–3	2–3	3–1
Hwaseong IBK Altos	0–3	2–3		1–3	1–3	1–3	3–1
Incheon Heungkuk Pink Spiders	2–3	3–0	3–0		3–2	0–3	3–0
Gimcheon Hi-pass	3–2	3–2	1–3	1–3		2–3	3–0
Suwon Hyundai Hillstate	3–0	3–2	3–0	3–1	3–0		3–0
Gwangju AI Peppers	1–3	2–3	1–3	1–3	1–3	1–3	

Source: Round 1 & Round 2
Legend: Blue = home team win; Red = away team win.

==== Rounds 3 and 4 ====
Home \ Away	SEL	DEJ	HWA	INC	GIM	SUW	GWA
GS Caltex Seoul KIXX		3–2	3–0	2–3*	1–3	3–2	1–3*
Daejeon KGC	3–1		3–0	1–3	2–3	3–2	3–1
Hwaseong IBK Altos	3–2	1–3		1–3	3–0	0–3	3–0
Incheon Heungkuk Pink Spiders	3–2	1–3	3–0		3–2	2–3	3–1
Gimcheon Hi-pass	1–3	3–1	3–2	0–3		3–1	1–3
Suwon Hyundai Hillstate	3–1	3–1	3–0	1–3	3–1		3–0
Gwangju AI Peppers	0–3	0–3	1–3	1–3	0–3	0–3	

Source: Round 3 & Round 4
Legend: Blue = home team win; Red = away team win.

* game played at away team's ground

==== Rounds 5 and 6 ====
Home \ Away	SEL	DEJ	HWA	INC	GIM	SUW	GWA
GS Caltex Seoul KIXX		1–3	2–3	1–3	0–3	0–3	3–0
Daejeon KGC	0–3		3–2	0–3	0–3	3–2	3–1
Hwaseong IBK Altos	3–1	0–3		0–3	3–1	3–0	2–3
Incheon Heungkuk Pink Spiders	2–3*	3–0	1–3		3–0	3–1	3–0
Gimcheon Hi-pass	1–3	2–3	3–1	3–1		3–2	2–3
Suwon Hyundai Hillstate	3–0	1–3	3–2	0–3	1–3		3–2
Gwangju AI Peppers	0–3*	1–3	1–3	1–3	0–3	3–2	

Source: Round 5 & Round 6
Legend: Blue = home team win; Red = away team win.

* game played at away team's ground

== Final stage ==
=== Bracket (Men's) ===
Playoff
2	Cheonan Hyundai Skywalkers	3	2	3
3	Suwon KEPCO Vixtorm	2	3	1

Championship
1	Incheon Korean Air Jumbos	3	3	3
2	Cheonan Hyundai Skywalkers	1	0	2

=== Bracket (Women's) ===
Playoff
2	Suwon Hyundai Hillstate	1	0
3	Gimcheon Hi-pass	3	3

Championship
1	Incheon Heungkuk Pink Spiders	3	3	1	1	2
3	Gimcheon Hi-pass	1	0	3	3	3

== Attendance ==
=== Men's teams ===
Pos	Team	Total	High	Low	Average	Change
1	Seoul Woori Card Wibee	46,593	3,273	1,608	2,589	+238.0%
2	Cheonan Hyundai Skywalkers	30,400	2,626	952	1,689	+105.2%
3	Uijeongbu KB Insurance Stars	28,471	2,748	834	1,582	+132.3%
4	Ansan Rush & Cash	25,756	2,662	612	1,431	+188.5%
5	Incheon Korean Air Jumbos	23,923	2,194	685	1,329	+91.5%
6	Suwon KEPCO Vixtorm	21,251	2,374	552	1,181	+84.2%
7	Daejeon Samsung Bluefangs	18,599	1,633	567	1,033	+89.5%
	League total	194,993	3,273	552	1,548	+133.1%

Notes:
Attendances taken from individual match pages and calculated by spreadsheet

- Many games from the previous season had restricted attendance due to COVID protocols.

=== Women's teams ===
Pos	Team	Total	High	Low	Average	Change
1	Incheon Heungkuk Life Pink Spiders	81,708	6,110	2,822	4,539	+241.0%
2	GS Caltex Seoul KIXX	48,897	3,331	1,517	2,717	+91.2%
3	Suwon Hyundai Hillstate	42,517	3,791	996	2,342	+76.1%
4	Gyeongbuk Gimcheon Hi-pass	40,727	4,375	982	2,263	+66.0%
5	Daejeon KGC	34,973	3,374	859	1,943	+58.2%
6	Hwaseong IBK Altos	33,111	3,709	1,013	1,840	+32.0%
7	Gwangju AI Peppers	32,613	3,000	786	1,812	+38.0%
	League total	314,816	6,110	786	2,494	+86.1%

Notes:
Attendances taken from individual match pages and calculated by spreadsheet

- Many games from the previous season had restricted attendance due to COVID protocols.

== Top Performers ==
=== Men's (Points) ===
Rank	Player	Club	Points
1	(Cuba) Leonardo Leyva	Ansan OKman	921
2	(Netherlands) Thijs Ter Horst	Suwon KEPCO Vixtorm	882
3	(Libya) Ahmed Ikhbayri	Daejeon Samsung Bluefangs	875
4	(Russia) Oreol Camejo Durruthy	Cheonan Hyundai Skywalkers	625
5	(South Korea) Na Gyeong-bok	Seoul Woori Card Wibee	603
6	(Australia) Lincoln Williams	Incheon Korean Air Jumbos	599
7	(South Korea) Heo Su-bong	Cheonan Hyundai Skywalkers	582
8	(Spain) Andrés Villena	Uijeongbu KB Insurance Stars	555
9	(Colombia) Liberman Agamez	Seoul Woori Card Wibee	523
10	(South Korea) Jung Ji-seok	Incheon Korean Air Jumbos	507

Source: 남자부 선수 기록

=== Women's (Points) ===
Rank	Player	Club	Points
1	(Romania) Elizabet Inneh	Daejeon KGC	1015
2	(Cameroon) Laetitia Moma Bassoko	GS Caltex Seoul KIXX	879
3	(Bosnia and Herzegovina) Jelena Mladjenović	Incheon Heungkuk Pink Spiders	821
4	(United States) Nia Reed	Gwangju AI Peppers	717
5	(South Korea) Kim Yeon-koung	Incheon Heungkuk Pink Spiders	669
6	(Puerto Rico) Daly Santana	Hwaseong IBK Altos	606
7	(South Korea) Pyo Seung-ju	Hwaseong IBK Altos	529
8	(South Korea) Park Jeong-ah	Gimcheon Hi-pass	526
9	(South Korea) Yang Hyo-jin	Suwon Hyundai Hillstate	523
10	(South Korea) Lee So-young	Daejeon KGC	457

Source: 여자부 선수 기록

== Player of the Round ==
=== Men's ===
Round	Player	Club
1	(Serbia) Nikola Meljanac	Uijeongbu KB Insurance Stars
2	(South Korea) Han Sun-soo	Incheon Korean Air Jumbos
3	(Cuba) Leonardo Leyva	Ansan OKman
4	(Netherlands) Thijs Ter Horst	Suwon KEPCO Vixtorm
5	(South Korea) Heo Su-bong	Cheonan Hyundai Skywalkers
6	(South Korea) Han Sun-soo	Incheon Korean Air Jumbos

=== Women's ===
Round	Player	Club
1	(South Korea) Kim Yeon-koung	Incheon Heungkuk Pink Spiders
2	(United States) Yaasmeen Bedart-Ghani	Suwon Hyundai Hillstate
3	(South Korea) Kim Yeon-koung	Incheon Heungkuk Pink Spiders
4	(Bosnia and Herzegovina) Jelena Mladjenović	Incheon Heungkuk Pink Spiders
5	(South Korea) Kim Yeon-koung	Incheon Heungkuk Pink Spiders
6	(South Korea) Kim Yeon-koung	Incheon Heungkuk Pink Spiders

== Final standing ==
=== Men's League ===
Rank	Team
1st place, gold medalist(s)	Incheon Korean Air Jumbos
2nd place, silver medalist(s)	Cheonan Hyundai Skywalkers
3rd place, bronze medalist(s)	Suwon KEPCO Vixtorm
4	Seoul Woori Card Wibee
5	Ansan OKman
6	Uijeongbu KB Insurance Stars
7	Daejeon Samsung Bluefangs

=== Women's League ===
Rank	Team
1st place, gold medalist(s)	Gimcheon Korea Expressway Corporation Hi-pass
2nd place, silver medalist(s)	Incheon Heungkuk Pink Spiders
3rd place, bronze medalist(s)	Suwon Hyundai Hillstate
4	Daejeon KGC
5	GS Caltex Seoul KIXX
6	Hwaseong IBK Altos
7	Gwangju AI Peppers
