= 2024–25 V-League (South Korea) =

South Korean volleyball league

- League: V-League
- Sport: Volleyball
- Duration: 19 October 2024 – 9 April 2025
- Teams: M: 7; W: 7

Regular season (Men's)

Regular season (Women's)

Finals
- Champions: M: Cheonan Hyundai Skywalkers; W: Incheon Heungkuk Life Pink Spiders
- Runners-up: M: Incheon Korean Air Jumbos; W: Daejeon CheongKwanJang Red Sparks
- Finals MVP: M: W: (South Korea) Kim Yeon-koung

V-League seasons
- ← 2023–24 2025–26 →

The 2024–25 V-League season was the 21st season of the V-League, the highest professional volleyball league in South Korea. The season runs from 19 October 2024 to 5 April 2025.

== Teams ==
=== Men's clubs ===
Location of teams in V-League Men's Clubs

2024–25 V.League (South Korea) Men's
Club	Head coach	Location	Stadium	Capacity
Ansan OK Financial Group Okman	(Japan) Masaji Ogino	Ansan	Sangnoksu Gymnasium	2,700
Cheonan Hyundai Capital Skywalkers	(France) Philippe Blain	Cheonan	Yu Gwan-sun Gymnasium	5,482
Daejeon Samsung Bluefangs	(South Korea) Kim Sang-woo	Daejeon	Chungmu Gymnasium	5,000
Uijeongbu KB Insurance Stars	(Spain) Miguel Rivera	Uijeongbu	Uijeongbu Gymnasium	6,240
Incheon Korean Air Jumbos	(Finland) Tommi Tiilikainen	Incheon	Gyeyang Gymnasium	4,270
Seoul Woori Card WON	(Brazil) Mauricio Paes	Seoul	Jangchung Gymnasium	4,507
Suwon KEPCO Vixtorm	(South Korea) Kwon Young-Min	Suwon	Suwon Gymnasium	4,317

=== Women's clubs ===
Location of teams in V-League Women's Clubs

2024–25 V.League (South Korea) Women's
Club	Head coach	Location	Stadium	Capacity
Daejeon CheongKwanJang Red Sparks	(South Korea) Ko Hee-Jin	Daejeon	Chungmu Gymnasium	5,000
Gimcheon Korea Expressway Hi-pass	(South Korea) Kim Jong-Min	Gimcheon	Gimcheon Gymnasium	6,000
GS Caltex Seoul KIXX	(South Korea) Lee Young-taek	Seoul	Jangchung Gymnasium	4,507
Hwaseong IBK Altos	(South Korea) Kim Ho-Chul	Hwaseong	Hwaseong Gymnasium	5,158
Incheon Heungkuk Life Pink Spiders	(Italy) Marcello Abbondanza	Incheon	Samsan World Gymnasium	7,140
Suwon Hyundai E&C Hillstate	(South Korea) Kang Sung-Hyung	Suwon	Suwon Gymnasium	4,317
Gwangju AI Peppers	(South Korea) Jang So-yeon	Gwangju	Yeomju Gymnasium	8,500

== Season standing procedure ==
1. Match won 3–0 or 3–1: 3 points for the winner, 0 points for the loser.
2. Match won 3–2: 2 points for the winner, 1 point for the loser.
3. Standings – Points, matches won, Sets ratio, Points ratio, then Result of the last match between the tied teams

== Regular season ==
- If the fourth ranked team finishes within three points of the third ranked team, a semi playoff will be held between the two teams to decide who advances to the playoff game.

=== League table (Men's) ===
Pos	Team	Pld	W	L	Pts	SR	SPR	Qualification
1	Cheonan Hyundai Skywalkers	36	30	6	88	2.743	1.122	Championship
2	Uijeongbu KB Insurance Stars	36	24	12	69	1.439	1.032	Playoff
3	Incheon Korean Air Jumbos	36	21	15	65	1.273	1.046	Playoff
4	Seoul Woori Card WON	36	18	18	51	0.935	0.990	
5	Daejeon Samsung Bluefangs	36	13	23	43	0.734	0.965	
6	Suwon KEPCO Vixtorm	36	13	23	35	0.644	0.946	
7	Ansan OKman	36	7	29	27	0.489	0.919	

Source: League table (Men's)

=== League table (Women's) ===
Pos	Team	Pld	W	L	Pts	SR	SPR	Qualification
1	Incheon Heungkuk Life Pink Spiders	36	27	9	81	1.978	1.128	Championship
2	Suwon Hyundai E&C Hillstate	36	21	15	66	1.397	1.083	Playoff
3	Daejeon CheongKwanJang Red Sparks	36	23	13	64	1.323	1.023	Playoff
4	Hwaseong IBK Altos	36	15	21	47	0.800	0.964	
5	Gimcheon Korea Expressway Hi-pass	36	17	19	46	0.848	0.969	
6	GS Caltex Seoul KIXX	36	12	24	39	0.682	0.935	
7	Gwangju AI Peppers	36	11	25	35	0.614	0.923	

Source: League table (Women's)

== Final stage ==
=== Bracket (Men's) ===
Playoff
2	Uijeongbu KB Insurance Stars	3	0	0
3	Incheon Korean Air Jumbos	1	3	3

Championship
1	Cheonan Hyundai Skywalkers	3	3	3
3	Incheon Korean Air Jumbos	1	1	1

=== Bracket (Women's) ===
Playoff
2	Suwon Hyundai E&C Hillstate	0	3	1
3	Daejeon CheongKwanJang Red Sparks	3	0	3

Championship
1	Incheon Heungkuk Life Pink Spiders	3	3	2	2	3
3	Daejeon CheongKwanJang Red Sparks	0	2	3	3	2

== Top Performers ==
=== Men's (Points) ===
Rank	Player	Club	Points
1	(Spain) Andrés Villena	Uijeongbu KB Insurance Stars	846
2	(Cuba) Leonardo Leyva	Cheonan Hyundai Skywalkers	682
3	(Iran) Ali Fazli	Daejeon Samsung Bluefangs	622
4	(South Korea) Heo Su-bong	Cheonan Hyundai Skywalkers	574
5	(Iran) Ali Haghparast	Seoul Woori Card WON	529
6	(Russia) Maksim Zhigalov	Daejeon Samsung Bluefangs	491
7	(South Korea) Lim Seong-jin	Suwon KEPCO Vixtorm	484
8	(South Korea) Na Gyeong-buk	Uijeongbu KB Insurance Stars	470
9	(South Korea) Kim Ji-han	Seoul Woori Card WON	467
10	(South Korea) Shin Ho-jin	Ansan OKman	448

Source: 남자부 선수 기록

=== Women's (Points) ===
Rank	Player	Club	Points
1	(Cuba) Gyselle Silva	GS Caltex Seoul KIXX	1008
2	(Ukraine) Viktoriia Danchak	Hwaseong IBK Altos	910
3	(Indonesia) Megawati Hangestri Pertiwi	Daejeon Red Sparks	802
4	(Cameroon) Laetitia Moma Bassoko	Suwon Hyundai Hillstate	721
5	(Serbia) Vanja Bukilić	Daejeon Red Sparks	638
6	(Bulgaria) Merelin Nikolova	Gimcheon Hi-pass	637
7	(South Korea) Kim Yeon-koung	Incheon Heungkuk Pink Spiders	585
8	(United States) Taylor Fricano	Gwangju AI Peppers	562
9	(South Korea) Kang So-hwi	Gimcheon Hi-pass	548
10	(South Korea) Park Jeong-ah	Gwangju AI Peppers	484

Source: 여자부 선수 기록

== Player of the Round ==
=== Men's ===
Round	Player	Club
1	(South Korea) Heo Su-bong	Cheonan Hyundai Skywalkers
2	(South Korea) Heo Su-bong	Cheonan Hyundai Skywalkers
3	(Spain) Andrés Villena	Uijeongbu KB Insurance Stars
4	(Cuba) Leonardo Leyva	Cheonan Hyundai Skywalkers
5	(Spain) Andrés Villena	Uijeongbu KB Insurance Stars
6	(Spain) Andrés Villena	Uijeongbu KB Insurance Stars

=== Women's ===
Round	Player	Club
1	(South Korea) Kim Yeon-koung	Incheon Heungkuk Pink Spiders
2	(South Korea) Kim Yeon-koung	Incheon Heungkuk Pink Spiders
3	(Indonesia) Megawati Hangestri Pertiwi	Daejeon Red Sparks
4	(Indonesia) Megawati Hangestri Pertiwi	Daejeon Red Sparks
5	(South Korea) Kim Yeon-koung	Incheon Heungkuk Pink Spiders
6	(Cuba) Gyselle Silva	GS Caltex Seoul KIXX

== Final standing ==
=== Men's League ===
Rank	Team
1st place, gold medalist(s)	Cheonan Hyundai Skywalkers
2nd place, silver medalist(s)	Incheon Korean Air Jumbos
3rd place, bronze medalist(s)	Uijeongbu KB Insurance Stars
4	Seoul Woori Card WON
5	Daejeon Samsung Bluefangs
6	Suwon KEPCO Vixtorm
7	Ansan OKman

=== Women's League ===
Rank	Team
1st place, gold medalist(s)	Incheon Heungkuk Pink Spiders
2nd place, silver medalist(s)	Daejeon Red Sparks
3rd place, bronze medalist(s)	Suwon Hyundai E&C Hillstate
4	Hwaseong IBK Altos
5	Gimcheon Korea Expressway Hi-pass
6	GS Caltex Seoul KIXX
7	Gwangju AI Peppers
