= 2023–24 V-League (South Korea) =

South Korean volleyball league

- League: V-League
- Sport: Volleyball
- Duration: 14 October 2023 – April 2024
- Teams: M: 7; W: 7

Regular season (Men's)
- Top seed: Incheon Korean Air Jumbos
- Top scorer: (Cuba) Yosvany Hernandez (Daejeon Samsung Bluefangs)

Regular season (Women's)
- Top seed: Suwon Hyundai Hillstate
- Top scorer: (Cuba) Gyselle Silva (GS Caltex Seoul KIXX)

Finals
- Champions: M: Incheon Korean Air Jumbos; W: Suwon Hyundai Hillstate
- Runners-up: M: Ansan OKman; W: Incheon Heungkuk Pink Spiders
- Finals MVP: M: (South Korea) Jung Ji-seok; W: (Cameroon) Laetitia Moma Bassoko

V-League seasons
- ← 2022–23 2024–25 →

The 2023–24 V-League season was the 20th season of the V-League, the highest professional volleyball league in South Korea. The season ran from 14 October 2023 to April 2024.

== Teams ==
=== Men's clubs ===
Location of teams in V-League Men's Clubs

2023–24 V.League (South Korea) Men's
Club	Head coach	Location	Stadium	Capacity
Ansan OK Financial Group Okman	(Japan) Masaji Ogino	Ansan	Sangnoksu Gymnasium	2,700
Cheonan Hyundai Capital Skywalkers	(South Korea) Choi Tae-woong	Cheonan	Yu Gwan-sun Gymnasium	5,482
Daejeon Samsung Bluefangs	(South Korea) Kim Sang-woo (volleyball)	Daejeon	Chungmu Gymnasium	5,000
Uijeongbu KB Insurance Stars	(South Korea) Hu In-jeong	Uijeongbu	Uijeongbu Gymnasium	6,240
Incheon Korean Air Jumbos	(Finland) Tommi Tiilikainen	Incheon	Gyeyang Gymnasium	4,270
Seoul Woori Card WON	(South Korea) Shin Young-Chul	Seoul	Jangchung Gymnasium	4,507
Suwon KEPCO Vixtorm	(South Korea) Kwon Young-Min	Suwon	Suwon Gymnasium	4,317

=== Foreign Players ===
The list of 2023–24 V.League (South Korea) Men's Foreign Players
Club	Player	From AVC
Ansan OK Financial Group Okman	(Cuba) Leonardo Leyva Martinez (NORCECA)	(Mongolia) Batsükh Bayarsaikhan
Cheonan Hyundai Capital Skywalkers	(Libya) Ahmed Ikhbayri (CAVB)	(Taiwan) Tsai Pei-Chang
Daejeon Samsung Bluefangs	(Cuba) Yosvany Hernandez Cardonell (NORCECA)	(Mongolia) Enkh-Erdene Jargaltsogt
Uijeongbu KB Insurance Stars	(Spain) Andrés Villena (CEV)	(Taiwan) Liu Hung-Min
Incheon Korean Air Jumbos	(Australia) Lincoln Williams (AVC)	(Philippines) Marck Espejo
Seoul Woori Card WON	(Slovenia) Matej Kök (CEV)	(Japan) Issei Otake
Suwon KEPCO Vixtorm	(Netherlands) Thijs Ter Horst (CEV)	(Japan) Ryohei Iga

=== Women's clubs ===
Location of teams in V-League Women's Clubs

2023–24 V.League (South Korea) Women's
Club	Head coach	Location	Stadium	Capacity
Daejeon CheongKwanJang Red Sparks	(South Korea) Ko Hee-Jin	Daejeon	Chungmu Gymnasium	5,000
Gimcheon Korea Expressway Hi-pass	(South Korea) Kim Jong-Min	Gimcheon	Gimcheon Gymnasium	6,000
GS Caltex Seoul KIXX	(South Korea) Cha Sang-Hyun	Seoul	Jangchung Gymnasium	4,507
Hwaseong IBK Altos	(South Korea) Kim Ho-Chul	Hwaseong	Hwaseong Gymnasium	5,158
Incheon Heungkuk Life Pink Spiders	(Italy) Marcello Abbondanza	Incheon	Samsan World Gymnasium	7,140
Suwon Hyundai E&C Hillstate	(South Korea) Kang Sung-Hyung	Suwon	Suwon Gymnasium	4,317
Gwangju AI Peppers	(United States) Joseph Trinsey	Gwangju	Yeomju Gymnasium	8,500

=== Foreign Players ===
The list of 2023–24 V.League (South Korea) Women's Foreign Players
Club	Player	From AVC
Daejeon CheongKwanJang Red Sparks	(United States) Giovanna Milana (NORCECA)	(Indonesia) Megawati Hangestri Pertiwi
Gimcheon Korea Expressway Hi-pass	(Serbia) Vanja Bukilić (CEV)	(Thailand) Thanacha Sooksod
GS Caltex Seoul KIXX	(Cuba) Gyselle Silva (NORCECA)	(Thailand) Darin Pinsuwan
Hwaseong IBK Altos	(Puerto Rico) Brittany Abercrombie (NORCECA)	(Thailand) Pornpun Guedpard
Incheon Heungkuk Life Pink Spiders	(United States) Willow Johnson (NORCECA)	(Japan) Reina Tokoku
Suwon Hyundai E&C Hillstate	(Cameroon) Laëtitia Moma Bassoko (CAVB)	(Thailand) Wipawee Srithong
Gwangju AI Peppers	(United States) Yaasmeen Bedart-Ghani (NORCECA)	(Philippines) MJ Phillips

== Season standing procedure ==
1. Match won 3–0 or 3–1: 3 points for the winner, 0 points for the loser.
2. Match won 3–2: 2 points for the winner, 1 point for the loser.
3. Standings – Points, matches won, Sets ratio, Points ratio, then Result of the last match between the tied teams
4. If the 4th-placed team finishes within three points of the 3rd placed team, an extra league game is played between these two teams.

== Regular season ==
- If the fourth ranked team finishes within three points of the third ranked team, a semi playoff will be held between the two teams to decide who advances to the playoff game.

=== League table (Men's) ===
Pos	Team	Pld	W	L	Pts	SR	SPR	Qualification
1	Incheon Korean Air Jumbos	36	23	13	71	1.615	1.073	Championship
2	Seoul Woori Card WON	36	23	13	70	1.474	1.039	Playoff
3	Ansan OKman	36	20	16	58	1.014	1.003	Semi-playoff
4	Cheonan Hyundai Skywalkers	36	18	18	55	1.042	1.018	Semi-playoff
5	Suwon KEPCO Vixtorm	36	18	18	53	0.985	0.991	
6	Daejeon Samsung Bluefangs	36	19	17	50	0.986	0.973	
7	Uijeongbu KB Insurance Stars	36	5	31	21	0.384	0.909	

Source: League table (Men's)

=== League table (Women's) ===
Pos	Team	Pld	W	L	Pts	SR	SPR	Qualification
1	Suwon Hyundai Hillstate	36	26	10	80	1.765	1.077	Championship
2	Incheon Heungkuk Pink Spiders	36	28	8	79	1.979	1.089	Playoff
3	Daejeon Red Sparks	36	20	16	61	1.175	1.034	Playoff
4	GS Caltex Seoul KIXX	36	18	18	51	0.913	0.994	
5	Hwaseong IBK Altos	36	17	19	51	0.986	1.013	
6	Gimcheon Hi-pass	36	12	24	39	0.682	0.946	
7	Gwangju AI Peppers	36	5	31	17	0.386	0.865	

Source: League table (Women's)

== Final stage ==
=== Bracket (Men's) ===
Semi-playoff
3	Ansan OKman	3
4	Cheonan Hyundai Skywalkers	2

Playoff
2	Seoul Woori Card Woori WON	2	0
3	Ansan OKman	3	3

Championship
1	Incheon Korean Air Jumbos	3	3	3
3	Ansan OKman	1	0	2

=== Bracket (Women's) ===
Playoff
2	Incheon Heungkuk Pink Spiders	3	1	3
3	Daejeon Red Sparks	1	3	0

Championship
1	Suwon Hyundai Hillstate	3	3	3
2	Incheon Heungkuk Pink Spiders	2	2	2

== Top Performers ==
=== Men's (Points) ===
Rank	Player	Club	Points
1	(Cuba) Yosvany Hernandez	Daejeon Samsung Bluefangs	1068
2	(Cuba) Leonardo Leyva	Ansan OKman	955
3	(Spain) Andrés Villena	Uijeongbu KB Insurance Stars	923
4	(Libya) Ahmed Ikhbayri	Cheonan Hyundai Skywalkers	892
5	(Netherlands) Thijs Ter Horst	Suwon KEPCO Vixtorm	726
6	(Slovenia) Matej Kök	Seoul Woori Card WON	669
7	(South Korea) Lim Dong-hyeok	Incheon Korean Air Jumbos	559
8	(South Korea) Heo Su-bong	Cheonan Hyundai Skywalkers	544
9	(South Korea) Kim Ji-han	Seoul Woori Card WON	496
10	(South Korea) Lim Seong-jin	Suwon KEPCO Vixtorm	432

Source: 남자부 선수 기록

=== Women's (Points) ===
Rank	Player	Club	Points
1	(Cuba) Gyselle Silva	GS Caltex Seoul KIXX	1005
2	(Puerto Rico) Brittany Abercrombie	Hwaseong IBK Altos	942
3	(Serbia) Vanja Bukilić	Gimcheon Hi-pass	935
4	(Cameroon) Laetitia Moma Bassoko	Suwon Hyundai Hillstate	886
5	(United States) Yaasmeen Bedart-Ghani	Gwangju AI Peppers	827
6	(South Korea) Kim Yeon-koung	Incheon Heungkuk Pink Spiders	775
7	(Indonesia) Megawati Hangestri Pertiwi	Daejeon Red Sparks	736
8	(United States) Giovanna Milana	Daejeon Red Sparks	690
9	(South Korea) Yang Hyo-jin	Suwon Hyundai Hillstate	546
10	(Bosnia and Herzegovina) Jelena Mladjenović	Incheon Heungkuk Pink Spiders	501

Source: 여자부 선수 기록

== Player of the Round ==
=== Men's ===
Round	Player	Club
1	(Cuba) Yosvany Hernandez	Daejeon Samsung Bluefangs
2	(South Korea) Lim Seong-jin	Suwon KEPCO Vixtorm
3	(Slovenia) Matej Kök	Seoul Woori Card WON
4	(Cuba) Leonardo Leyva	Ansan OKman
5	(South Korea) Lim Dong-hyeok	Incheon Korean Air Jumbos
6	(Cuba) Leonardo Leyva	Ansan OKman

=== Women's ===
Round	Player	Club
1	(Indonesia) Megawati Hangestri Pertiwi	Daejeon Red Sparks
2	(South Korea) Kim Yeon-koung	Incheon Heungkuk Pink Spiders
3	(Puerto Rico) Brittany Abercrombie	Hwaseong IBK Altos
4	(South Korea) Kim Da-in	Suwon Hyundai Hillstate
5	(South Korea) Kim Yeon-koung	Incheon Heungkuk Pink Spiders
6	(Cameroon) Laetitia Moma Bassoko	Suwon Hyundai Hillstate

== Final standing ==
=== Men's League ===
Rank	Team
1st place, gold medalist(s)	Incheon Korean Air Jumbos
2nd place, silver medalist(s)	Ansan OKman
3rd place, bronze medalist(s)	Seoul Woori Card WON
4	Cheonan Hyundai Skywalkers
5	Suwon KEPCO Vixtorm
6	Daejeon Samsung Bluefangs
7	Uijeongbu KB Insurance Stars

=== Women's League ===
Rank	Team
1st place, gold medalist(s)	Suwon Hyundai Hillstate
2nd place, silver medalist(s)	Incheon Heungkuk Pink Spiders
3rd place, bronze medalist(s)	Daejeon Red Sparks
4	GS Caltex Seoul KIXX
5	Hwaseong IBK Altos
6	Gimcheon Hi-pass
7	Gwangju AI Peppers
