= 2021–22 V-League (South Korea) =

V League
- Season: 2021–22
- Dates: October 2021 – April 2022

The 2021–22 V-League season was the 18th season of the V-League, the highest professional volleyball league in South Korea. The season ran from October 2021 to April 2022. Incheon Korean Air Jumbos were the defending champions for male teams and GS Caltex Seoul KIXX for the female teams. A new team, Gwangju AI Peppers joined the female league from this season.

== Teams ==
=== Men's clubs ===
Location of teams in V-League Men's Clubs

| Team | Location | Stadium | Capacity |
|---|---|---|---|
| Ansan OK Financial Group Okman | Ansan | Sangnoksu Gymnasium | 2,700 |
| Cheonan Hyundai Capital Skywalkers | Cheonan | Yu Gwan-sun Gymnasium | 5,482 |
| Daejeon Samsung Bluefangs | Daejeon | Chungmu Gymnasium | 5,000 |
| Uijeongbu KB Insurance Stars | Uijeongbu | Uijeongbu Gymnasium | 6,240 |
| Incheon Korean Air Jumbos | Incheon | Gyeyang Gymnasium | 4,270 |
| Seoul Woori Card Wibee | Seoul | Jangchung Gymnasium | 4,507 |
| Suwon KEPCO Vixtorm | Suwon | Suwon Gymnasium | 4,317 |

=== Women's clubs ===
Location of teams in V-League Women's Clubs

| Team | Location | Stadium | Capacity |
|---|---|---|---|
| Daejeon KGC | Daejeon | Chungmu Gymnasium | 5,000 |
| Gimcheon Korea Expressway Hi-pass | Gimcheon | Gimcheon Gymnasium | 6,000 |
| GS Caltex Seoul KIXX | Seoul | Jangchung Gymnasium | 4,507 |
| Hwaseong IBK Altos | Hwaseong | Hwaseong Gymnasium | 5,152 |
| Incheon Heungkuk Life Pink Spiders | Incheon | Gyeyang Gymnasium | 4,270 |
| Suwon Hyundai E&C Hillstate | Suwon | Suwon Gymnasium | 4,317 |
| Gwangju AI Peppers | Gwangju | Yeomju Gymnasium | 8,500 |

== Season standing procedure ==
1. Match points
2. Number of matches won
3. Sets ratio
4. Points ratio
5. Result of the last match between the tied teams
- If the 4th-placed team finishes within three points of the 3rd placed team, an extra league game is played between these two teams.

Match won 3–0 or 3–1: 3 match points for the winner, 0 match points for the loser
Match won 3–2: 2 match points for the winner, 1 match point for the loser

== Regular season ==
=== League table (Men's) ===
| Pos | Team | Pld | W | L | Pts | SR | SPR | Qualification |
|---|---|---|---|---|---|---|---|---|
| 1 | Incheon Korean Air Jumbos | 36 | 24 | 12 | 70 | 1.582 | 1.077 | Finals |
| 2 | Uijeongbu KB Insurance Stars | 36 | 19 | 17 | 62 | 1.149 | 1.028 | Semifinals |
| 3 | Seoul Woori Card Wibee | 36 | 17 | 19 | 59 | 1.075 | 1.029 | Semifinals |
| 4 | Suwon KEPCO Vixtorm | 36 | 20 | 16 | 56 | 1.058 | 0.995 | |
| 5 | Ansan OKman | 36 | 17 | 19 | 44 | 0.797 | 0.975 | |
| 6 | Daejeon Samsung Bluefangs | 36 | 14 | 22 | 44 | 0.763 | 0.941 | |
| 7 | Cheonan Hyundai Skywalkers | 36 | 15 | 21 | 43 | 0.775 | 0.959 | |

Source: League table (Men's)

- As Suwon KEPCO finished within three points of Seoul Woori, a play-off was held between the two teams which Suwon won, advancing them to the semi-final play-off game.

=== League table (Women's) ===
| Pos | Team | Pld | W | L | Pts | SR | SPR | Qualification |
|---|---|---|---|---|---|---|---|---|
| 1 | Suwon Hyundai Hillstate | 31 | 28 | 3 | 82 | 3.034 | 1.161 | Finals |
| 2 | Gimcheon Hi-pass | 32 | 24 | 8 | 70 | 1.854 | 1.108 | Semifinals |
| 3 | GS Caltex Seoul KIXX | 31 | 20 | 11 | 62 | 1.972 | 1.102 | Semifinals |
| 4 | Daejeon KGC | 32 | 15 | 17 | 46 | 0.917 | 0.990 | |
| 5 | Hwaseong IBK Altos | 32 | 11 | 21 | 31 | 0.634 | 0.944 | |
| 6 | Incheon Heungkuk Pink Spiders | 33 | 10 | 23 | 31 | 0.566 | 0.922 | |
| 7 | Gwangju AI Peppers | 31 | 3 | 28 | 11 | 0.244 | 0.812 | |

Source: League table (Women's)

=== Results / Fixtures - Male ===
==== Rounds 1 and 2 ====
| Home \ Away | INC | CHN | ANS | DEJ | SEL | UJB | SUW |
|---|---|---|---|---|---|---|---|
| Incheon Korean Air Jumbos | — | 3–1 | 3–0 | 3–2 | 3–1 | 1–3 | 1–3 |
| Cheonan Hyundai Skywalkers | 3–2 | — | 3–1 | 3–0 | 3–2 | 3–0 | 2–3 |
| Ansan OKman | 0–3 | 3–2 | — | 3–1 | 3–2 | 3–1 | 1–3 |
| Daejeon Samsung Bluefangs | 3–0 | 3–1 | 2–3 | — | 3–2 | 1–3* | 0–3 |
| Seoul Woori Card Wibee | 0–3 | 1–3 | 0–3 | 2–3 | — | 3–2* | 3–0 |
| Uijeongbu KB Insurance Stars | 3–1 | 3–2 | 3–1 | 2–3 | 3–0 | — | 0–3 |
| Suwon KEPCO Vixtorm | 3–2 | 3–0 | 0–3 | 0–3 | 1–3 | 3–1 | — |

Updated to match(es) played on -. Source:
Legend: Blue = home team win; Yellow = draw; Red = away team win.

(*) = game played at away team's ground

==== Rounds 3 and 4 ====
| Home \ Away | INC | CHN | ANS | DEJ | SEL | UJB | SUW |
|---|---|---|---|---|---|---|---|
| Incheon Korean Air Jumbos | — | 3–0 | 2–3 | 2–3 | 3–0 | 3–0 | 3–1 |
| Cheonan Hyundai Skywalkers | 0–3 | — | 3–0 | 3–0 | 3–2 | 1–3 | 3–2 |
| Ansan OKman | 0–3 | 2–3 | — | 3–2 | 0–3 | 0–3* | 1–3* |
| Daejeon Samsung Bluefangs | 2–3 | 0–3 | 3–0 | — | 0–3 | 1–3 | 3–1 |
| Seoul Woori Card Wibee | 3–0 | 3–1 | 2–3 | 3–0 | — | 1–3 | 3–0 |
| Uijeongbu KB Insurance Stars | 2–3 | 3–0 | 2–3 | 2–3* | 1–3* | — | 2–3 |
| Suwon KEPCO Vixtorm | 1–3 | 3–1 | 3–2 | 3–1 | 0–3 | 1–3 | — |

Updated to match(es) played on unknown. Source:
Legend: Blue = home team win; Yellow = draw; Red = away team win.

==== Rounds 5 and 6 ====
| Home \ Away | INC | CHN | ANS | DEJ | SEL | UJB | SUW |
|---|---|---|---|---|---|---|---|
| Incheon Korean Air Jumbos | — | 3–0 | 3–0 | 3–2 | 1–3 | 3–2 | 3–2 |
| Cheonan Hyundai Skywalkers | 1–3 | — | 0–3 | 3–2 | 2–3 | 1–3 | 0–3 |
| Ansan OKman | 0–3 | 1–3 | — | 3–2 | 3–2 | 3–0 | 3–1 |
| Daejeon Samsung Bluefangs | 0–3 | 3–0 | 1–3 | — | 3–1 | 0–3 | 3–1 |
| Seoul Woori Card Wibee | 2–3 | 2–3 | 3–1 | 3–0 | — | 0–3 | 3–1 |
| Uijeongbu KB Insurance Stars | 3–2 | 3–0 | 3–1* | 0–3 | 3–2 | — | 1–3 |
| Suwon KEPCO Vixtorm | 3–1 | 3–2 | 3–1* | 3–0 | 1–3 | 3–2 | — |

Updated to match(es) played on unknown. Source:
Legend: Blue = home team win; Yellow = draw; Red = away team win.

(*) = game played at away team's ground

=== Results / Fixtures - Female ===
==== Rounds 1 and 2 ====
| Home \ Away | SEL | DEJ | HWA | INC | GIM | SUW | GWA |
|---|---|---|---|---|---|---|---|
| GS Caltex Seoul KIXX | — | 3–0 | 3–1 | 3–0 | 2–3 | 1–3 | 3–0 |
| Daejeon KGC | 3–1 | — | 3–0 | 3–1 | 3–0 | 0–3 | 3–0 |
| Hwaseong IBK Altos | 0–3 | 1–3 | — | 1–3 | 1–3 | 1–3 | 1–3 |
| Incheon Heungkuk Pink Spiders | 0–3 | 0–3 | 0–3 | — | 1–3* | 1–3* | 3–1 |
| Gimcheon Hi-pass | 0–3 | 3–0 | 3–0 | 3–1 | — | 0–3 | 3–0 |
| Swuon Hyundai Hillstate | 3–0* | 3–1 | 3–1 | 3–1 | 3–0 | — | 3–2 |
| Gwangju AI Peppers | 0–3 | 1–3 | 2–3 | 1–3 | 1–3* | 0–3 | — |

Updated to match(es) played on - all 1st round matches completed. Source:
Legend: Blue = home team win; Yellow = draw; Red = away team win.
- = game played at away team's ground

==== Rounds 3 and 4 ====
| Home \ Away | SEL | DEJ | HWA | INC | GIM | SUW | GWA |
|---|---|---|---|---|---|---|---|
| GS Caltex Seoul KIXX | — | 3–1* | 3–0 | 3–0 | 1–3 | 1–3* | 3–0 |
| Daejeon KGC | 3–1 | — | 3–0 | 1–3 | 1–3 | 0–3 | 3–0 |
| Hwaseong IBK Altos | 0–3 | 3–0 | — | 0–3 | 2–3 | 1–3 | 3–0 |
| Incheon Heungkuk Pink Spiders | 1–3 | 3–0 | 2–3 | — | 1–3 | 0–3 | 3–1 |
| Gimcheon Hi-pass | 3–1 | 3–0 | 3–0 | 3–1* | — | 3–2 | 3–0* |
| Swuon Hyundai Hillstate | 3–1 | 3–2 | 3–0 | 3–1 | 3–1 | — | 3–0 |
| Gwangju AI Peppers | 0–3 | 0–3 | 3–0 | 1–3 | 0–3 | 0–3 | — |

Updated to match(es) played on all 2nd round matches completed. Source:
Legend: Blue = home team win; Yellow = draw; Red = away team win.
- = game played at away team's ground

==== Rounds 5 and 6 ====
| Home \ Away | SEL | DEJ | HWA | INC | GIM | SUW | GWA |
|---|---|---|---|---|---|---|---|
| GS Caltex Seoul KIXX | — | 3–0 | - | 3–0 | - | 2–3 | - |
| Daejeon KGC | - | — | 2–3 | - | 1–3 | 3–2 | 3–1 |
| Hwaseong IBK Altos | 3–0 | 3–1 | — | 3–0 | 3–1 | - | 3–0 |
| Incheon Heungkuk Pink Spiders | 0–3 | 3–0 | 3–1 | — | 1–3 | 0–3 | - |
| Gimcheon Hi-pass | 0–3 | - | - | 3–0 | — | 3–0 | 3–0 |
| Swuon Hyundai Hillstate | - | - | 3–1 | - | 3–2 | — | - |
| Gwangju AI Peppers | 0–3 | 1–3 | - | 3–1 | - | 0–3 | — |

Updated to match(es) played on all 3rd round matches completed. Source:
Legend: Blue = home team win; Yellow = draw; Red = away team win.
- = game played at away team's ground

== Play-offs ==
=== Bracket (Men's ) ===
Semifinals
1 | Incheon Korean Air Jumbos
2 | Uijeongbu KB Stars | 3
3 | Suwon KEPCO Vixtorm | 1

Finals
1 | Incheon Korean Air Jumbos | 3 | 1 | 3
2 | Uijeongbu KB Stars | 1 | 3 | 2

- The play-offs were shortened due to COVID, with the semi-final being a one-of game, and the finals reduced to as series of three. The women's play-offs were cancelled entirely and no winner crowned.

== Attendance ==
=== Men's teams ===
| Pos | Team | Total | High | Low | Average | Change |
|---|---|---|---|---|---|---|
| 1 | Cheonan Hyundai Skywalkers | 14,819 | 1,669 | - | 823 | n/a |
| 2 | Seoul Woori Card Wibee | 13,795 | 1,408 | - | 766 | n/a |
| 3 | Incheon Korean Air Jumbos | 12,494 | 1,050 | - | 694 | n/a |
| 4 | Uijeongbu KB Insurance Stars | 12,251 | 1,317 | - | 681 | n/a |
| 5 | Suwon KEPCO Vixtorm | 11,536 | 1,090 | - | 641 | n/a |
| 6 | Daejeon Samsung Bluefangs | 9,812 | 1,091 | - | 545 | n/a |
| 7 | Ansan Rush & Cash | 8,928 | 838 | - | 496 | n/a |
| | League total | 83,635 | 1,669 | - | 664 | n/a |

Updated to games played on 3 April

- Many games this season have had restricted attendance due to COVID protocols.

=== Women's teams ===
| Pos | Team | Total | High | Low | Average | Change |
|---|---|---|---|---|---|---|
| 1 | GS Caltex Seoul KIXX | 19,895 | 1,712 | - | 1,421 | n/a |
| 2 | Hwaseong IBK Altos | 23,696 | 1,657 | - | 1,394 | n/a |
| 3 | Gyeongbuk Gimcheon Hi-pass | 21,084 | 3,082 | - | 1,363 | n/a |
| 4 | Incheon Heungkuk Life Pink Spiders | 21,299 | 2,610 | - | 1,331 | n/a |
| 5 | Suwon Hyundai Hillstate | 19,950 | 1,786 | - | 1,330 | n/a |
| 6 | Gwangju AI Peppers | 21,000 | 2,422 | - | 1,313 | n/a |
| 7 | Daejeon KGC | 20,880 | 2,571 | - | 1,228 | n/a |
| | League total | 148,524 | 3,082 | - | 1,340 | n/a |

Updated to games played on 26 March

- Most games this season have been closed door or restricted access.

== Top Performers ==
=== Men's (Points) ===
| Rank | Player | Club | Points |
|---|---|---|---|
| 1 | (Mali) Noumory Keita | Uijeongbu KB Insurance Stars | 1261 |
| 2 | (United States) Kyle Russell | Daejeon Samsung Bluefangs | 915 |
| 3 | (Cuba) Leonardo Leyva | Ansan OKman | 870 |
| 4 | (Portugal) Alexandre Ferreira | Seoul Woori Card Wibee | 804 |
| 5 | (Uganda) Daudi Okello | Suwon KEPCO Vixtorm | 671 |
| 6 | (Australia) Lincoln Williams | Incheon Korean Air Jumbos | 659 |
| 7 | (South Korea) Heo Su-bong | Cheonan Hyundai Skywalkers | 602 |
| 8 | (South Korea) Na Kyeong-buk | Seoul Woori Card Wibee | 568 |
| 9 | (South Korea) Lim Dong-hyeok | Incheon Korean Air Jumbos | 419 |
| 10 | (South Korea) Seo Jae-duck | Suwon KEPCO Vixtorm | 416 |

=== Women's (Points) ===
| Rank | Player | Club | Points |
|---|---|---|---|
| 1 | (Cameroon) Laetitia Moma Bassoko | GS Caltex Seoul KIXX | 819 |
| 2 | (United States) Kelsie Payne | Gimcheon Hi-pass | 775 |
| 3 | (United States) Katherine Bell | Incheon Heungkuk Pink Spiders | 773 |
| 4 | (United States) Yaasmeen Bedart-Ghani | Suwon Hyundai Hillstate | 674 |
| 5 | (Bosnia and Herzegovina) Jelena Mladjenović | Daejeon KGC | 672 |
| 6 | (Romania) Elizabet Inneh | Gwangju AI Peppers | 598 |
| 7 | (South Korea) Yang Hyo-jin | Suwon Hyundai Hillstate | 502 |
| 8 | (South Korea) Park Jeong-ah | Gimcheon Hi-pass | 440 |
| 9 | (South Korea) Kim Hee-jin | Hwaseong IBK Altos | 398 |
| 10 | (South Korea) Lee So-young | Daejeon KGC | 377 |

== Player of the Round ==
=== Men's ===
| Round | Player | Club |
|---|---|---|
| 1 | (Mali) Noumory Keita | Uijeongbu KB Insurance Stars |
| 2 | (United States) Kyle Russell | Daejeon Samsung Bluefangs |
| 3 | (Mali) Noumory Keita | Uijeongbu KB Insurance Stars |
| 4 | (Mali) Noumory Keita | Uijeongbu KB Insurance Stars |
| 5 | (Cuba) Leonardo Leyva | Ansan OKman |
| 6 | (Mali) Noumory Keita | Uijeongbu KB Insurance Stars |

=== Women's ===
| Round | Player | Club |
|---|---|---|
| 1 | (United States) Yaasmeen Bedart-Ghani | Suwon Hyundai Hillstate |
| 2 | (South Korea) Yang Hyo-jin | Suwon Hyundai Hillstate |
| 3 | (United States) Kelsie Payne | Gimcheon Hi-pass |
| 4 | (Cameroon) Laetitia Moma Bassoko | GS Caltex Seoul KIXX |
| 5 | (Cameroon) Laetitia Moma Bassoko | GS Caltex Seoul KIXX |
| 6 | - | - |

== Final standing ==
=== Men's League ===
| Rank | Team |
|---|---|
| 1st place, gold medalist(s) | Incheon Korean Air Jumbos |
| 2nd place, silver medalist(s) | Uijeongbu KB Insurance Stars |
| 3rd place, bronze medalist(s) | Suwon KEPCO Vixtorm |
| 4 | Seoul Woori Card Wibee |
| 5 | Ansan OKman |
| 6 | Daejeon Samsung Bluefangs |
| 7 | Cheonan Hyundai Skywalkers |

=== Women's League ===
| Rank | Team |
|---|---|
| 1st place, gold medalist(s) | Suwon Hyundai Hillstate |
| 2nd place, silver medalist(s) | Gimcheon Hi-pass |
| 3rd place, bronze medalist(s) | GS Caltex Seoul KIXX |
| 4 | Daejeon KGC |
| 5 | Hwaseong IBK Altos |
| 6 | Incheon Heungkuk Pink Spiders |
| 7 | Gwangju AI Peppers |

- Women's League postponed and then cancelled in Round 6 due to COVID cases.
