= Kwak Dong-hyuk =

South Korean volleyball player (born 1983)

Personal information
- Nationality: South Korean
- Born: 12 March 1983 (age 43); Seoul, South Korea
- Height: 178 cm (5 ft 10 in)
- Weight: 77 kg (170 lb)
- Education: Hanyang University

Volleyball information
- Position: Libero
- Current club: Uijeongbu KB Stars
- Number: 10

Career
Years	Teams
2005–08; 2011–14; 2014–16; 2016–	LIG Greaters; KEPCO Vixtorm; Samsung Fire Bluefangs; KB Stars

National team
2018–	South Korea

Kwak Dong-hyuk (Korean: 곽동혁; born 12 March 1983, in Seoul) is a South Korean male volleyball player. On club level he currently plays for the Uijeongbu KB Insurance Stars.

== Career ==
=== Clubs ===
In the 2005 V-League Draft, Kwak was selected eighth overall by the Gumi LIG Greaters.

=== National team ===
As a sophomore at Hanyang University in 2003, Kwak was selected for the South Korean junior national team and participated in the 2003 World Junior (U21) Volleyball Championship, where he led his team to the semifinals of the tournament as the starting libero.

In May 2017 Kwak first got called up to the South Korean senior national team for the 2017 FIVB World League. Kwak, however, was eventually placed on injured reserve due to a finger injury suffered in training camp.

In May 2018 Kwak was selected for Team Korea again to compete at the inaugural FIVB Nations League, where he played as the starting libero for the team.
