= Park Jeong-ah (volleyball) =

South Korean volleyball player (born 1993)

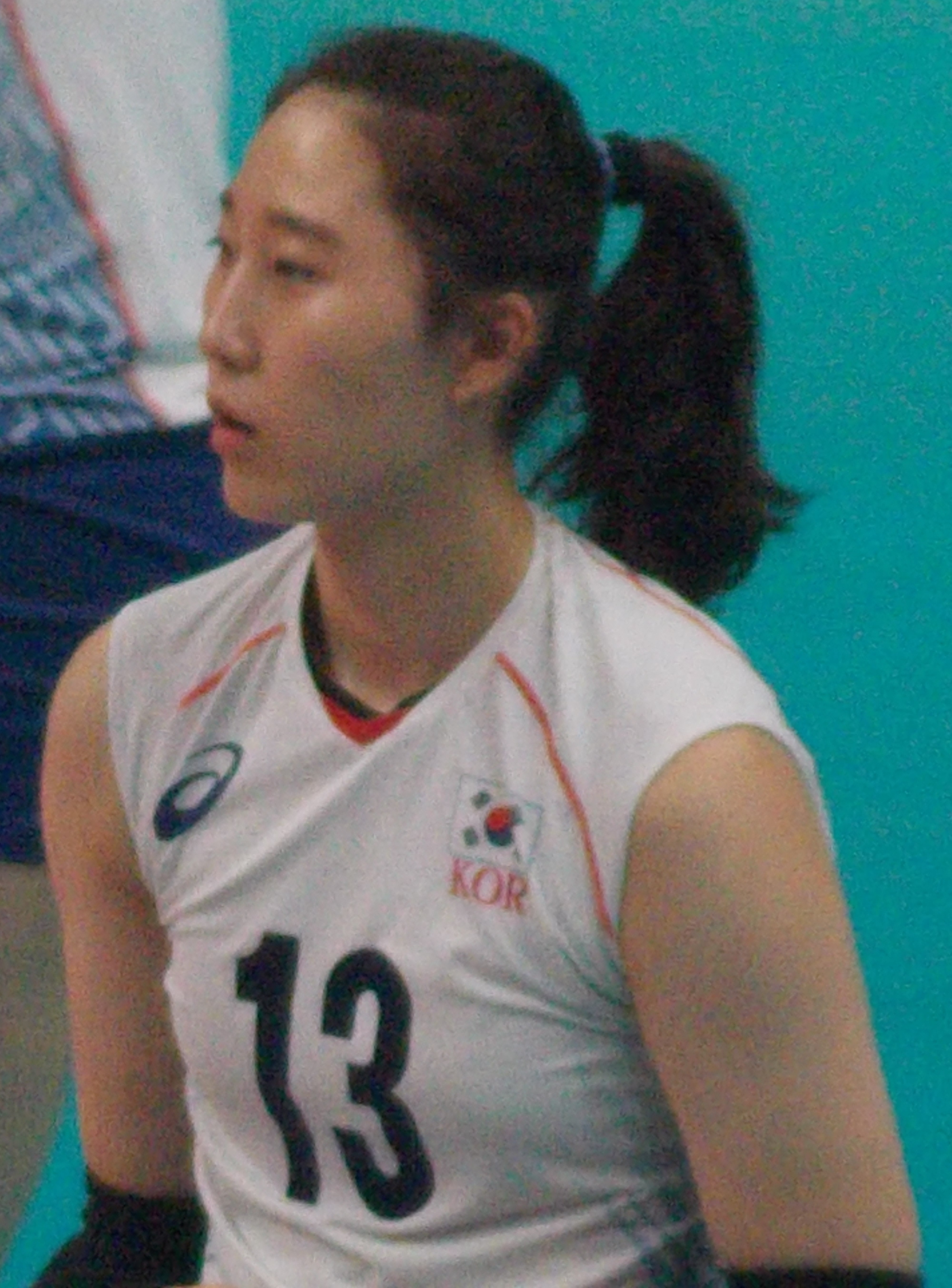

Personal information
- Nationality: South Korean
- Born: 26 March 1993 (age 33) Busan, South Korea
- Height: 187 cm (6 ft 2 in)
- Weight: 73 kg (161 lb)
- Spike: 300 cm (118 in)
- Block: 290 cm (114 in)

Volleyball information
- Position: Outside hitter / Opposite hitter
- Current club: Gwangju AI Peppers
- Number: 10 (club) 13 (national team)

National team
- Years: Team
- 2010–present: South Korea
Honours
Women's volleyball
Asian Games
Gold medal – first place	2014 Incheon
Bronze medal – third place	2018 Jakarta/Palembang
Asian Championship
Silver medal – second place	2015 Tianjin
Bronze medal – third place	2011 Taipei
Bronze medal – third place	2013 Nakhon Ratchasima
Bronze medal – third place	2017 Metro Manila
Asian Cup
Silver medal – second place	2014 Shenzhen
Asian Junior Championship
Silver medal – second place	2010 Ho Chi Minh City
- Updated on 26 Dec 2022

- Park Jeong-ah
- Hangul: 박정아
- Hanja: 朴貞娥
- RR: Bak Jeonga
- MR: Pak Chŏnga

Park Jeong-ah (Korean: 박정아; born 26 March 1993) is a South Korean female volleyball player. She is part of the South Korea women's national volleyball team.

Park was appointed as the new captain of the Korean Women's Volleyball National Team since Kim Yeon-koung stepped back.

== Career ==
She went to Namsung Women's Highschool.

In 2009, she made her first senior national team debut in age 16 at 2009 FIVB Volleyball Women's World Grand Champions Cup.

She currently plays for Korean club Gwangju AI Peppers since 2023 after her contract with Gyeongbuk Gimcheon Hi-pass expired.

She participated at the 2016 Summer Olympics, and the 2010 FIVB Volleyball Women's World Championship.

She plays as an Outside Hitter. She played as an Opposite Hitter at the 2018 FIVB Women's Volleyball Nations League. At the 2015 FIVB Volleyball Women's World Cup she played as a Middle Blocker in some matches.

Park participated at the 2020 Summer Olympics which took place in Tokyo, playing an important role, being the twelfth best scorer of the competition with 82 points and a 31.19% rate of efficiency.

== Club career ==
- (South Korea) Hwaseong IBK Altos (2011–2017)
- (South Korea) Korea Expressway Corporation Hi-Pass (2017–2023)
- (South Korea) Gwangju AI Peppers (2023–)

Years	Club	Regular season	Postseason
2011-12	Hwaseong IBK Altos	Fourth Place	Did not qualify
2012-13	Hwaseong IBK Altos	Champion	
2013-14	Hwaseong IBK Altos	Champion	Runners Up
2014-15	Hwaseong IBK Altos	Runners Up	Champion
2015-16	Hwaseong IBK Altos	Champion	Runners Up
2016-17	Hwaseong IBK Altos	Runners Up	Champion
2017-18	Korea Expressway Corporation Hi-Pass	Champion	
2018-19	Korea Expressway Corporation Hi-Pass	Runners Up	
2019-20	Korea Expressway Corporation Hi-Pass	Sixth Place	Championship Cancelled Due to COVID-19
2020-21	Korea Expressway Corporation Hi-Pass	Fourth Place	Did not qualify
2021-22	Korea Expressway Corporation Hi-Pass	Runners Up	Championship Cancelled Due to COVID-19
2022-23	Korea Expressway Corporation Hi-Pass	Third Place	Champion
2023–24	Gwangju AI Peppers	Seventh Place	Did not qualify

== Individual Awards ==
- 2010 Asian Junior Championship — "Best Scorer"
- 2011–12 Korean V-League – "New Face Award"
- 2014–15 Korean V-League – "Best Outside Hitter"
- 2015–16 Korean V-League – "Player of the Round (6R)"
- 2016 KOVO Cup - "Most Impressive Player (MVP)"
- 2016–17 Korean V-League – "Player of the Round (1R)"
- 2017–18 Korean V-League – "Finals MVP"
- 2018–19 Korean V-League – "Best Outside Hitter"
- 2021-22 Korean V-League - "Best Outside Hitter"
