= Yang Jun-sik =

South Korean volleyball player (born 1991)

Personal information
- Nationality: South Korean
- Born: 27 January 1991 (age 35) Seoul, South Korea
- Education: Inha University
- Height: 191 cm (6 ft 3 in)
- Weight: 87 kg (192 lb)

Volleyball information
- Position: Setter
- Current club: Uijeongbu KB Stars
- Number: 17

Career
- Years: Team
- 2012–14 2014–: KEPCO Vixtorm; LIG Greaters / KB Stars

Yang Jun-sik (Korean: 양준식; born 27 January 1991) is a South Korean male volleyball player who plays as a setter for the Uijeongbu KB Insurance Stars.

== Career ==
In the 2012 V-League Draft, Yang was selected third overall by the Suwon KEPCO Vixtorm. He became the starting setter in his rookie season and won the Rookie of the Year Award after the 2012–13 season. The following season, Yang platooned with the other fellow setters but didn't play well enough to earn the starting job.

Before the 2014–15 season, Yang was traded to the Gumi LIG Greaters, and subsequently became the Greaters' backup setter.
