= Suwon Hyundai Engineering & Construction Hillstate =

South Korean women's volleyball team

Suwon Hyundai E&C Hillstate 수원 현대건설 힐스테이트
- Full name: Suwon Hyundai Engineering and Construction Hillstate Women's Volleyball Club 수원 현대건설 힐스테이트 여자 배구단
- Short name: Hyundai Hillstate
- Founded: 1977; 49 years ago
- Ground: Suwon Gymnasium; Suwon, South Korea (Capacity: 5,145)
- Owner: Hyundai Engineering & Construction
- Chairman: Jung Soo-hyun
- Manager: Kang Sung-hyung
- Captain: Kim Yeong-yeon
- League: V-League
- 2025−26: Regular season: 2nd Postseason: Playoff
- Website: Club home page

Uniforms
| Home | Away |

Suwon Hyundai Engineering & Construction Hillstate (Korean: 수원 현대건설 힐스테이트) is a South Korean professional volleyball team. The team was founded in 1977 and became fully professional in 2005. They are based in Suwon and are members of the Korea Volleyball Federation (KOVO). Their home arena is Suwon Gymnasium in Suwon.

== History ==
The team won its first championship title in the 2010–11 season. In March 2016, the club won its second championship title by defeating the 2015–16 regular season winners Hwaseong IBK Altos 3–0 in the finals. The championship MVP was awarded to the team's captain Yang Hyo-jin.

== Honours ==
- Korea Volleyball Super League

Champions (10): 1985, 1986, 1987, 1988, 1990, 2000, 2001, 2002, 2003, 2004
Runners-up (4): 1984, 1991, 1993, 1999

- V-League

Champions (3): 2010−11, 2015–16, 2023–24
Runners-up (3): 2006−07, 2009−10, 2011−12

- KOVO Cup

Winners (5): 2006, 2014, 2019, 2021, 2024
Runners-up (3): 2009, 2013, 2015

== Season-by-season records ==
V-League record
| League | Season | Postseason | Regular season | | | | |
| League | Season | Postseason | Rank | Games | Won | Lost | Points |
|---|---|---|---|---|---|---|---|
| V-League | 2005 | Playoff | 3 | 16 | 10 | 6 | — |
| V-League | 2005–06 | Did not qualify | 4 | 28 | 14 | 14 | — |
| V-League | 2006–07 | Runners-up | 3 | 24 | 13 | 11 | — |
| V-League | 2007–08 | Did not qualify | 5 | 28 | 4 | 24 | — |
| V-League | 2008–09 | Did not qualify | 4 | 28 | 10 | 18 | — |
| V-League | 2009–10 | Runners-up | 1 | 28 | 23 | 5 | — |
| V-League | 2010–11 | Champions | 1 | 24 | 20 | 4 | — |
| V-League | 2011–12 | Runners-up | 3 | 30 | 15 | 15 | 43 |
| V-League | 2012–13 | Playoff | 3 | 30 | 16 | 14 | 50 |
| V-League | 2013–14 | Did not qualify | 5 | 30 | 12 | 18 | 38 |
| V-League | 2014–15 | Playoff | 3 | 30 | 19 | 11 | 56 |
| V-League | 2015–16 | Champions | 2 | 30 | 17 | 13 | 53 |
| V-League | 2016–17 | Did not qualify | 4 | 30 | 14 | 16 | 41 |
| V-League | 2017–18 | Playoff | 3 | 30 | 14 | 16 | 46 |
| V-League | 2018–19 | Did not qualify | 5 | 30 | 9 | 21 | 29 |
| V-League | 2019–20 | Cancelled | 1 | 27 | 20 | 7 | 55 |
| V-League | 2020–21 | Did not qualify | 6 | 30 | 11 | 19 | 34 |
| V-League | 2021–22 | Cancelled | 1 | 31 | 28 | 3 | 82 |
| V-League | 2022–23 | Playoff | 2 | 36 | 24 | 12 | 70 |
| V-League | 2023–24 | Champions | 1 | 36 | 26 | 10 | 80 |
| V-League | 2024–25 | Playoff | 2 | 36 | 21 | 15 | 66 |
| V-League | 2025–26 | Playoff | 2 | 36 | 22 | 14 | 65 |

== See also ==
- Hyundai Engineering & Construction
