= Busan OK Savings Bank OKman =

South Korean men's volleyball team

Busan OK Savings Bank OKman 부산 OK저축은행 읏맨
- Founded: 2013; 13 years ago
- Ground: Gangseo Gymnasium; Busan, South Korea (Capacity: 4,189)
- Owner: Choi Yoon
- Chairman: Kwon Chul-geun
- Manager: Shin Young-chul
- Captain: Jeon Kwang-in
- League: V-League
- 2025–26: Regular season: 6th Postseason: Did not qualify
- Website: Club home page

Busan OK Savings Bank OKman (Korean: 부산 OK저축은행 읏맨) is a South Korean professional volleyball team founded in 2013. They are based in Busan and are members of the Korea Volleyball Federation (KOVO). Their home arena is Gangseo Gymnasium in Busan.

The team was founded in Ansan, Gyeonggi Province. They relocated to Busan in 2025.

== Honours ==
- V-League

Champions (2): 2014–15, 2015–16
Runners-up (1): 2023–24

- KOVO Cup

Winners (1): 2023
Runners-up (4): 2015, 2019, 2021, 2025

== Season-by-season records ==
Busan OK Savings Bank OKman
Season	Postseason	Regular season				
Season	Postseason	Rank	Games	Won	Lost	Points
2013–14	Did not qualify	6	30	11	19	34
2014–15	Champions	2	36	25	11	71
2015–16	Champions	2	36	23	13	71
2016–17	Did not qualify	7	36	7	29	20
2017–18	Did not qualify	7	36	10	26	32
2018–19	Did not qualify	5	36	17	19	51
2019–20	Cancelled	4	32	16	16	50
2020–21	Playoff	4	36	19	17	55
2021–22	Did not qualify	5	36	17	19	44
2022–23	Did not qualify	5	36	16	20	48
2023–24	Runners-up	3	36	20	16	58
2024–25	Did not qualify	7	36	7	29	27
2025–26	Did not qualify	6	36	17	19	50
