= Elizabet Inneh =

Hungarian volleyball player

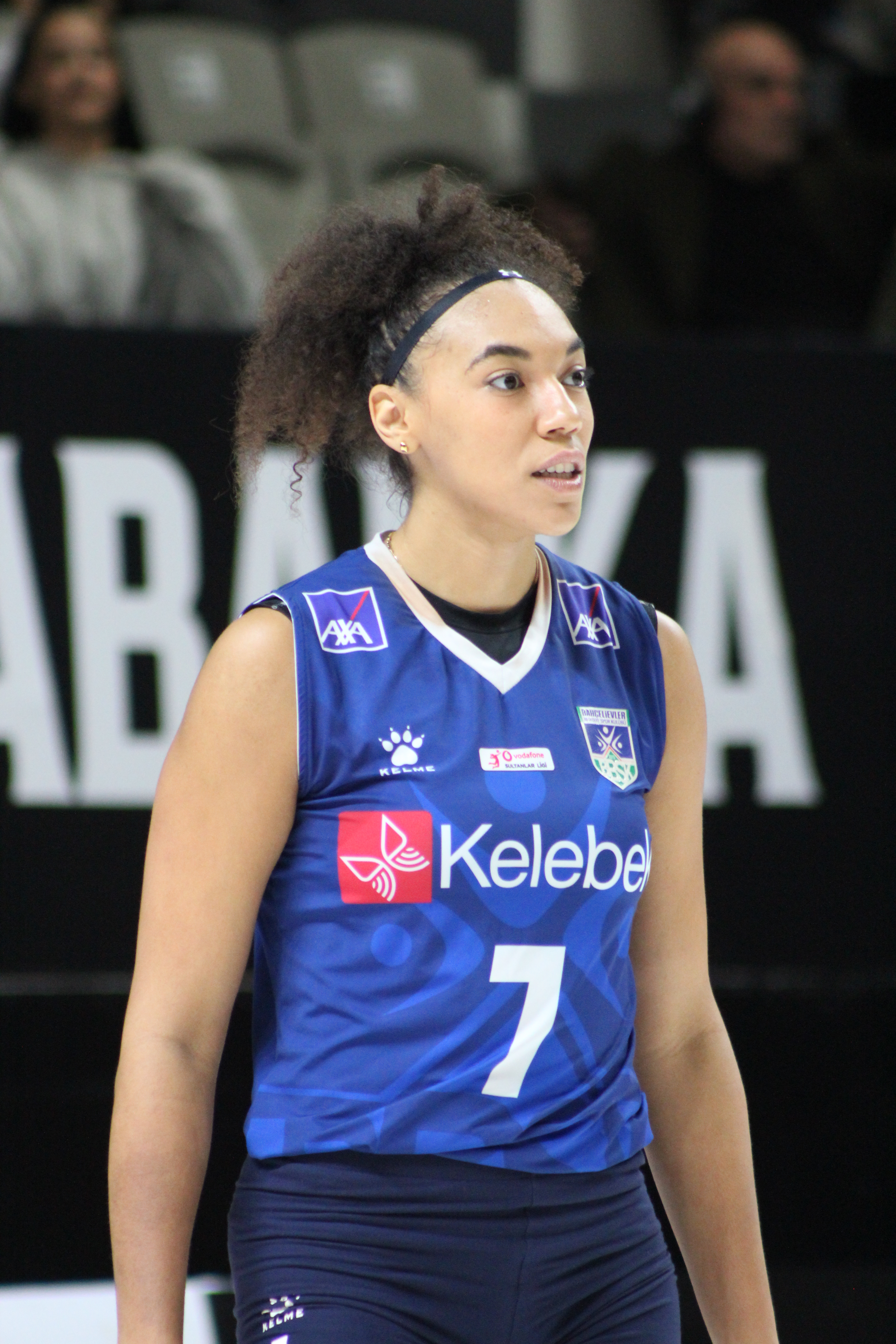

Personal information
- Full name: Elizabet Lenke Varga-Inneh
- Born: 21 March 1999 (age 27) Budapest, Hungary
- Height: 1.87 m (6 ft 2 in)
- Spike: 3.10 m (122 in)
- Block: 2.99 m (118 in)

Volleyball information
- Position: Opposite
- Number: 7

Career
- Years: Team
- 2013–2014: (Romania) ACS Borș
- 2014–2017: (Romania) CSU Medicina Târgu Mureș
- 2017–2021: (Hungary) Fatum-Nyíregyháza
- 2021–2022: (South Korea) Gwangju AI Peppers
- 2022–2023: (South Korea) Daejeon KGC
- 2023–2024: (Poland) Chemik Police
- 2024–: (Turkey) Bahçelievler Belediye S.K.

National team
- Years: Team
- 2018–: Romania

Elizabet Inneh (born 21 March 1999) is a Romanian volleyball player who plays for Bahçelievler Belediye S.K. and the Romania national team.

== Career ==
In November 2022, during the 2022–23 season in the V-League, she scored 56 points against Suwon Hyundai Engineering & Construction Hillstate. In 2023, Inneh of Daejeon KGC became the first player to score over 1,000 points in South Korea since 2014.

== Trophies ==
- Polish League:
  - Winner: 2024
- Polish Supercup:
  - Winner: 2023
- Hungarian League:
  - Winner: 2021
- Hungarian Cup:
  - Winner: 2018, 2019, 2021

== Individual awards ==
- Polish League Best Foreigner: 2024
- South Korean League Top Scorer (1015 points): 2023

== Personal life ==
She grew up in Oradea, Romania from the age of one month, with her mother and grandparents. Her father was from the Benin City, Nigeria.
