= Cheonan Hyundai Capital Skywalkers =

South Korean professional volleyball team

Cheonan Hyundai Capital Skywalkers 천안 현대캐피탈 스카이워커스
- Full name: Cheonan Hyundai Capital Skywalkers Volleyball Club 천안 현대캐피탈 스카이워커스 배구단
- Founded: 1983; 43 years ago
- Ground: Yu Gwan-Sun Gymnasium; Cheonan, Chungcheongnam-do, South Korea (Capacity: 5,482)
- Owner: Hyundai Capital
- Chairman: Chung Hyung-jin
- Manager: Philippe Blain
- Captain: Heo Su-bong
- League: V-League
- 2025–26: Regular season: 2nd Postseason: Runners-up
- Website: Club home page

Uniforms
Home	Away

Cheonan Hyundai Capital Skywalkers is a South Korean professional volleyball team. The team was founded in 1983 and became fully professional in 2005. They are based in Cheonan and are members of the Korea Volleyball Federation (KOVO). Their home arena is Yu Gwan-Sun Gymnasium in Cheonan. They have won the championship five times, in 2006, 2007, 2017, 2019, and 2025.

== History ==
In 1983, the team were established as Hyundai Motor Service Men's Volleyball Team. They had won the Korea Volleyball Super League five times between 1986 and 1995.

In 2002, they were refounded as Hyundai Capital Men's Volleyball team. After the foundation of the professional league in 2005, they won their first championship in the 2005–06 season.

== Honours ==
- Korea Volleyball Super League

Champions (5): 1986, 1987, (Note: Fourth edition) 1987, (Note: Fifth edition) 1994, 1995
Runners-up (10): 1988, 1990, 1993, 1996, 1997, 1998, 2000, 2001, 2003, 2004

- V-League

Champions (5): 2005–06, 2006–07, 2016–17, 2018–19, 2024–25
Runners-up (9): 2005, 2007–08, 2008–09, 2009–10, 2013–14, 2015–16, 2017–18, 2022–23, 2025–26

- KOVO Cup

Winners (5): 2006, 2008, 2010, 2013, 2024
Runners-up (2): 2009, 2026

== Season-by-season records ==
V-League
Season	Postseason	Regular season				
Season	Postseason	Rank	Games	Won	Lost	Points
2005	Runners-up	1	20	18	2	—
2005–06	Champions	1	35	31	4	—
2006–07	Champions	2	30	24	6	—
2007–08	Runners-up	3	35	24	11	—
2008–09	Runners-up	1	35	28	7	—
2009–10	Runners-up	2	36	26	10	—
2010–11	Playoff	2	30	22	8	—
2011–12	Playoff	3	36	22	14	70
2012–13	Playoff	2	30	18	12	52
2013–14	Runners-up	2	30	21	9	61
2014–15	Did not qualify	5	36	15	21	52
2015–16	Runners-up	1	36	28	8	81
2016–17	Champions	2	36	23	13	68
2017–18	Runners-up	1	36	22	14	70
2018–19	Champions	2	36	25	11	70
2019–20	Cancelled	3	32	19	13	56
2020–21	Did not qualify	6	36	15	21	41
2021–22	Did not qualify	7	36	15	21	43
2022–23	Runners-up	2	36	22	14	67
2023–24	Semi-playoff	4	36	18	18	55
2024–25	Champions	1	36	30	6	88
2025–26	Runners-up	2	36	22	14	69
