= Incheon Korean Air Jumbos =

South Korean men's volleyball team

Incheon Korean Air Jumbos 인천 대한항공 점보스
- Full name: Incheon Korean Air Jumbos Pro Volleyball Club 인천 대한항공 점보스 배구단
- Founded: 1969; 57 years ago
- Ground: Gyeyang Gymnasium; Incheon, South Korea (Capacity: 5,000)
- Owner: Korean Air
- Chairman: Kwon Hyuk-sam
- Manager: Renan Dal Zotto
- Captain: Jung Ji-seok
- League: V-League
- 2025–26: Regular season: 1st Postseason: Champions
- Website: Club home page

Incheon Korean Air Jumbos (Korean: 인천 대한항공 점보스) is a South Korean professional volleyball team. The team was founded in 1969 and became fully professional in 2005. They are based in Incheon and are members of the Korea Volleyball Federation (KOVO). Their home arena is Gyeyang Gymnasium in Incheon.

== Honours ==
- Korea Volleyball Super League

Runners-up: 1999

- V-League

Champions (6): 2017–18, 2020–21, 2021–22, 2022–23, 2023–24, 2025–26
Runners-up (6): 2010–11, 2011–12, 2012–13, 2016–17, 2018–19, 2024–25

- KOVO Cup

Winners (7): 2007, 2011, 2014, 2019, 2022, 2025, 2026
Runners-up (3): 2010, 2020, 2024

== Season-by-season records ==
V-League
Season	Postseason	Regular season				
Season	Postseason	Rank	Games	Won	Lost	Points
2005	Did not qualify	4	20	6	14	—
2005–06	Did not qualify	4	35	15	20	—
2006–07	Playoff	3	30	19	11	—
2007–08	Playoff	2	35	27	8	—
2008–09	Playoff	3	35	22	13	—
2009–10	Playoff	3	36	25	11	—
2010–11	Runners-up	1	30	25	5	—
2011–12	Runners-up	2	36	28	8	80
2012–13	Runners-up	3	30	17	13	52
2013–14	Playoff	3	30	16	14	50
2014–15	Did not qualify	4	36	18	18	55
2015–16	Semi-playoff	4	36	21	15	64
2016–17	Runners-up	1	36	25	11	72
2017–18	Champions	3	36	22	14	61
2018–19	Runners-up	1	36	25	11	75
2019–20	Cancelled	2	31	23	8	65
2020–21	Champions	1	36	26	10	76
2021–22	Champions	1	36	24	12	70
2022–23	Champions	1	36	26	10	76
2023–24	Champions	1	36	23	13	71
2024–25	Runners-up	3	36	21	15	65
2025–26	Champions	1	36	23	13	69
