= Kelsie Payne =

American volleyball player (born 1995)

Personal information
- Nationality: (United States) American
- Born: 29 November 1995 (age 30); Tuscaloosa, Alabama, United States
- Height: 1.91 m (6 ft 3 in)
- Weight: 72 kg (159 lb)
- Education: University of Kansas

Volleyball information
- Position: Opposite
- Current club: (United States) Dallas Pulse
- Number: 8

Career
Years	Teams
2018–2019; 2019–2020; 2020- 2022; 2022-2023; 2023-2024; 2024-2025; 2025; 2026	(Brazil) EC Pinheiros (Switzerland) VC Kanti Schaffhausen (South Korea) Gimcheon Hi-pass (Turkey) Sigortashop (Italy) Città Di Messina (United States) Athletes Unlimited (United States) Omaha Supernovas (United States) Dallas Pulse

National team
United States

Kelsie Payne (born 29 November 1995) is an American volleyball player who has played in Brazil, Switzerland, South Korea, Türkiye, and Italy. Payne attended the University of Kansas (KU) from 2014 to 2018 where she set school records in career hitting percentage, career kills, and kills per set. Payne was also a three-time All-American and Big 12 Player of The Year (2016). During her time at KU, Payne led her team to a Big 12 championship and a final four appearance. Her jersey was retired by KU in 2022.

She has played for the Omaha Supernovas and the Dallas Pulse in the Pro Volleyball Federation (later branded Major League Volleyball) and for Athletes Unlimited. In May 2026, she won a Major League Volleyball championship with the Dallas Pulse.
