= Nia Reed =

American volleyball player

Personal information
- Full name: Nia Kai Reed
- Nationality: United States
- Born: June 27, 1996 (age 30); Cleveland, Ohio, U.S.
- Hometown: Fort Lee, NJ, U.S.
- Height: 6 ft 1 in (1.86 m)
- Education: Penn State

Volleyball information
- Position: Opposite
- Current club: (Brazil) Praia Clube

Career
Years	Teams
2018–2019	(Turkey) Halkbank Ankara
2019–2020	(Turkey) Edremit Bld. Altınoluk
2020–2021	(France) Volero Le Cannet
2021–2022	(Brazil) Sesi Vôlei Bauru
2022–?	(South Korea) Gwangju AI Peppers
2024–	(United States) Omaha Supernovas

National team
2022–	United States
Medal record
Indoor Volleyball
Representing the United States
Pan-American Cup
Bronze medal – third place	2022 Hermosillo

Nia Kai Reed (born June 27, 1996) is an American professional volleyball player who plays as an opposite hitter for the United States women's national volleyball team and for the Omaha Supernovas of the Pro Volleyball Federation.

== Early life ==
Reed was born in Cleveland, Ohio to parents William and JoMoree. She grew up in Fort Lee, New Jersey and attended high school at Immaculate Heart Academy. At Immaculate Heart, she was a four-year starter and led her team to four straight non-public state championships. She was named Player of the Year in 2011, 2012 and 2013 and played on the USA Volleyball Girls' Youth A2 team. She was the 12th ranked national recruit in her graduating class, and chose to play for Russ Rose at Penn State.

== Career ==
=== College ===
While at Penn State, Reed redshirted her freshman year, with her career spanning a total of five seasons from 2014 to 2018. Penn State won the NCAA national championship in 2014 during her redshirt season, although she was unable to play in any matches. She helped lead Penn State to the 2017 Final Four during her junior season. In 2018, her final season with Penn State, she was named an AVCA honorable mention All-American after finishing the season with a team-best 3.26 kills per set, hitting .253 and scoring 385.0 points. Penn State won a Big Ten title in 2017.

=== Professional clubs ===
- (Turkey) Halkbank Ankara (2018–2019)
- (Turkey) Edremit Bld. Altınoluk (2019–2020)
- (France) Volero Le Cannet (2020–2021)
- (Brazil) Sesi Vôlei Bauru (2021–2022)
- (South Korea) Gwangju AI Peppers (2022–?)
- (United States) Omaha Supernovas (2024)
- (Brazil) Praia Clube (2024)

=== USA National Team ===
In May 2022, Reed made her national team playing debut when she was named to the 25-player roster for the 2022 FIVB Volleyball Nations League tournament.

== Awards and honors ==
=== Clubs ===
- 2020–2021 Brazilian Cup – Champion, with Sesi Vôlei Bauru.
- 2021–2022 South American Club Championship – Bronze medal, with Sesi Vôlei Bauru
- 2021–22 Brazilian Superliga – Bronze medal, with Sesi Vôlei Bauru
- 2021–22 Paulista Championship – Bronze medal, with Sesi Vôlei Bauru

=== College ===
- 2014 NCAA Division I National Champions
- AVCA Honorable Mention All-American (2018)
