= Matej Kök =

Slovenian volleyball player (born 1996)

Personal information
- Nationality: Slovenian
- Born: 11 December 1996 (age 29); Maribor, Slovenia
- Height: 1.97 m (6 ft 6 in)

Volleyball information
- Position: Wing spiker
- Current club: ACH Volley
- Number: 18

Career
Years	Teams
2012–2017; 2017; 2017–2018; 2018–2019; 2019–2023; 2023–2024; 2024–	OK Triglav Kranj; MKS Będzin; ACH Volley; SK Posojilnica Aich/Dob; ACH Volley; Seoul Woori Card Woori Won; ACH Volley

National team
Slovenia

Matej Kök (born 11 December 1996) is a Slovenian male volleyball player who plays for ACH Volley. He is part of the Slovenia national team and plays at the position of wing spiker.
