= GS Caltex Seoul Kixx =

South Korean women's volleyball team

- Full name: Seoul GS Caltex Kixx Women's Volleyball Team
- Short name: GS Caltex
- Founded: 1970; 56 years ago
- Ground: Jangchung Arena; Seoul, South Korea (Capacity: 4,507)
- Owner: GS Caltex
- Chairman: Heo Se-hong
- Manager: Lee Young-taek
- Captain: Yoo Seo-yeun
- League: V-League
- 2025−26: Regular season: 3rd Postseason: Champions
- Website: Club home page

Uniforms
| Home | Away |

GS Caltex Seoul Kixx (Korean: GS칼텍스 서울 Kixx) is a South Korean women's volleyball team. The team is based in Seoul and plays in the V-League. It is currently owned by GS Sports, and its main sponsor is GS Caltex, a subsidiary of GS Group. The club was founded in 1970 as Honam Petrochemical Volleyball Team.

== Honours ==
=== Domestic ===
- Korea Volleyball Super League

Champions (9): 1991, 1992, 1993, 1994, 1995, 1996, 1997, 1998, 1999
Runners-up (3): 1988, 2000, 2001

- V-League

Champions (4): 2007−08, 2013−14, 2020–21, 2025–26
Runners-up (2): 2008−09, 2012−13

- KOVO Cup

Winners (7): 2007, 2012, 2017, 2020, 2022, 2023, 2026
Runners-up (3): 2014, 2018, 2021

=== Continental ===
- AVC Club Volleyball Championship

Winners: 1999

== Season-by-season records ==
V-League record
| League | Season | Postseason | Regular season | | | | |
| League | Season | Postseason | Rank | Games | Won | Lost | Points |
|---|---|---|---|---|---|---|---|
| V-League | 2005 | Did not qualify | 4 | 16 | 4 | 12 | — |
| V-League | 2005–06 | Did not qualify | 5 | 28 | 6 | 22 | — |
| V-League | 2006–07 | Did not qualify | 4 | 24 | 8 | 16 | — |
| V-League | 2007–08 | Champions | 3 | 28 | 14 | 14 | — |
| V-League | 2008–09 | Runners-up | 1 | 28 | 19 | 9 | — |
| V-League | 2009–10 | Playoff | 3 | 28 | 16 | 12 | — |
| V-League | 2010–11 | Did not qualify | 5 | 24 | 4 | 20 | — |
| V-League | 2011–12 | Did not qualify | 6 | 30 | 10 | 20 | 33 |
| V-League | 2012–13 | Runners-up | 2 | 30 | 21 | 9 | 62 |
| V-League | 2013–14 | Champions | 2 | 30 | 20 | 10 | 57 |
| V-League | 2014–15 | Did not qualify | 5 | 30 | 8 | 22 | 28 |
| V-League | 2015–16 | Did not qualify | 4 | 30 | 15 | 15 | 47 |
| V-League | 2016–17 | Did not qualify | 5 | 30 | 12 | 18 | 37 |
| V-League | 2017–18 | Did not qualify | 4 | 30 | 14 | 16 | 40 |
| V-League | 2018–19 | Playoff | 3 | 30 | 18 | 12 | 52 |
| V-League | 2019–20 | Cancelled | 2 | 27 | 18 | 9 | 54 |
| V-League | 2020–21 | Champions | 1 | 30 | 20 | 10 | 58 |
| V-League | 2021–22 | Cancelled | 3 | 31 | 20 | 11 | 62 |
| V-League | 2022–23 | Did not qualify | 5 | 36 | 16 | 20 | 48 |
| V-League | 2023–24 | Did not qualify | 4 | 36 | 18 | 18 | 51 |
| V-League | 2024–25 | Did not qualify | 6 | 36 | 12 | 24 | 39 |
| V-League | 2025–26 | Champions | 3 | 36 | 19 | 17 | 57 |
