= Daejeon Samsung Fire Bluefangs =

South Korean men's volleyball team

Daejeon Samsung Fire Bluefangs 대전 삼성화재 블루팡스
- Full name: Daejeon Samsung Fire Bluefangs Volleyball Club 대전 삼성화재 블루팡스 배구단
- Founded: 1995; 31 years ago
- Ground: Chungmu Gymnasium; Daejeon, South Korea (Capacity: 6,000)
- Owner: Cheil Worldwide
- Chairman: Kim Jong-hyun
- Manager: Tommi Tiilikainen
- Captain: Kim Woo-jin
- League: V-League
- 2025–26: Regular season: 7th Postseason: Did not qualify
- Website: Club home page

Uniforms
Home	Away

Daejeon Samsung Fire Bluefangs (Korean: 대전 삼성화재 블루팡스) is a South Korean professional volleyball team. The team was founded in 1995 and became fully professional in 2005. They are based in Daejeon and are members of the Korea Volleyball Federation (KOVO). Their home arena is Chungmu Gymnasium in Daejeon.

== Honours ==
=== Domestic ===
- Korea Volleyball Super League

Champions (8): 1997, 1998, 1999, 2000, 2001, 2002, 2003, 2004

- V-League

Champions (8): 2005, 2007–08, 2008–09, 2009–10, 2010–11, 2011–12, 2012–13, 2013–14
Runners-up (3): 2005–06, 2006–07, 2014–15

- KOVO Cup

Winners (2): 2009, 2018
Runners-up (4): 2006, 2008, 2012, 2023

=== Continental ===
- AVC Club Volleyball Championship

Champions (2): 2000, 2001
Runners-up: 1999

== Season-by-season records ==
V-League
Season	Postseason	Regular season				
Season	Postseason	Rank	Games	Won	Lost	Points
2005	Champions	2	20	18	2	—
2005–06	Runners-up	2	35	30	5	—
2006–07	Runners-up	1	30	25	5	—
2007–08	Champions	1	35	29	6	—
2008–09	Champions	2	35	26	9	—
2009–10	Champions	1	36	30	6	—
2010–11	Champions	3	30	16	14	—
2011–12	Champions	1	36	29	7	84
2012–13	Champions	1	30	24	6	70
2013–14	Champions	1	30	23	7	66
2014–15	Runners-up	1	36	29	7	84
2015–16	Playoff	3	36	23	13	66
2016–17	Did not qualify	4	36	18	18	58
2017–18	Playoff	2	36	22	14	61
2018–19	Did not qualify	4	36	19	17	55
2019–20	Cancelled	5	32	13	19	41
2020–21	Did not qualify	7	36	6	30	26
2021–22	Did not qualify	6	36	14	22	44
2022–23	Did not qualify	7	36	11	25	36
2023–24	Did not qualify	6	36	19	17	50
2024–25	Did not qualify	5	36	13	23	43
2025–26	Did not qualify	7	36	6	30	19

== See also ==
- Cheil Worldwide
- Samsung Fire & Marine Insurance
