= Seoul Woori Card Woori Won =

South Korean men's volleyball team

Seoul Woori Card Woori Won 서울 우리카드 우리WON
- Full name: Seoul Woori Card Woori Won Volleyball Club 서울 우리카드 우리WON 프로배구단
- Founded: 2008; 18 years ago
- Ground: Jangchung Arena; Seoul, South Korea (Capacity: 4,507)
- Owner: Woori Financial Group
- Chairman: Jin Sung-won
- Manager: Park Chul-woo
- Captain: Lee Seung-won
- League: V-League
- 2025–26: Regular season: 4th Postseason: Playoff
- Website: Club home page

Uniforms
Home	Away

Seoul Woori Card Woori Won (Korean: 서울 우리카드 우리WON) is a South Korean professional volleyball team founded in 2008. They are based in Seoul and are members of the Korea Volleyball Federation (KOVO). Their home arena is Jangchung Gymnasium.

== Honours ==
- V-League

Runners-up: 2020–21

- KOVO Cup

Winners (2): 2015, 2021
Runners-up (4): 2011, 2013, 2014, 2017

== Season-by-season records ==
V-League
Season	Postseason	Regular season				
Season	Postseason	Rank	Games	Won	Lost	Points
2009–10	Did not qualify	5	36	10	26	—
2010–11	Did not qualify	6	30	10	20	—
2011–12	Did not qualify	5	36	15	21	49
2012–13	Did not qualify	4	30	16	14	47
2013–14	Did not qualify	4	30	15	15	43
2014–15	Did not qualify	7	36	3	33	15
2015–16	Did not qualify	7	36	7	29	21
2016–17	Did not qualify	5	36	17	19	55
2017–18	Did not qualify	6	36	14	22	46
2018–19	Playoff	3	36	20	16	62
2019–20	Cancelled	1	32	25	7	69
2020–21	Runners-up	2	36	23	13	67
2021–22	Semi-playoff	3	36	17	19	59
2022–23	Semi-playoff	3	36	19	17	56
2023–24	Playoff	2	36	23	13	70
2024–25	Did not qualify	4	36	18	18	51
2025–26	Playoff	4	36	20	16	57
