= Uijeongbu KB Insurance Stars =

South Korean volleyball team

Uijeongbu KB Insurance Stars 의정부 KB손해보험 스타즈
- Full name: Uijeongbu KB Insurance Stars Volleyball Club 의정부 KB손해보험 스타즈 배구단
- Founded: 1976; 50 years ago
- Ground: Uijeongbu Gymnasium; Uijeongbu, Gyeonggi Province, South Korea (Capacity: 4,620)
- Owner: KB Life Insurance
- Chairman: Koo Bon-wook
- Captain: Hwang Taek-eui
- League: V-League
- 2025–26: Regular season: 3rd Postseason: Semi-playoff
- Website: Club home page

Uniforms
Home	Away

Uijeongbu KB Insurance Stars (Korean: 의정부 KB손해보험 스타즈) is a South Korean professional volleyball team. The team was founded in 1976 and became fully professional in 2005. They are based in Uijeongbu and are members of the Korea Volleyball Federation (KOVO). Their home arena is Uijeongbu Gymnasium.

== Honours ==
- Korea Volleyball Super League

Runners-up (5): 1985, 1987, 1991, 1995, 2002

- V-League

Runners-up: 2021–22

- KOVO Cup

Winners: 2012
Runners-up (3): 2007, 2016, 2018

== Season-by-season records ==
V-League
Season	Postseason	Regular season				
Season	Postseason	Rank	Games	Won	Lost	Points
2005	Playoff	3	20	9	11	—
2005–06	Playoff	3	35	16	19	—
2006–07	Did not qualify	4	30	14	16	—
2007–08	Did not qualify	4	35	15	20	—
2008–09	Did not qualify	4	35	17	18	—
2009–10	Did not qualify	4	36	24	12	—
2010–11	Semi-playoff	4	30	15	15	—
2011–12	Did not qualify	6	36	11	25	33
2012–13	Did not qualify	5	30	13	17	42
2013–14	Did not qualify	5	30	12	18	37
2014–15	Did not qualify	6	36	13	23	36
2015–16	Did not qualify	6	36	10	26	28
2016–17	Did not qualify	6	36	14	22	43
2017–18	Did not qualify	4	36	19	17	54
2018–19	Did not qualify	6	36	16	20	46
2019–20	Cancelled	6	33	10	23	31
2020–21	Semi-playoff	3	36	19	17	58
2021–22	Runners-up	2	36	19	17	62
2022–23	Did not qualify	6	36	15	21	42
2023–24	Did not qualify	7	36	5	31	21
2024–25	Semi-playoff	2	36	24	12	69
2025–26	Semi-playoff	3	36	19	17	58

== See also ==
- Cheongju KB Stars
