= Hwaseong IBK Altos =

South Korean women's professional volleyball team

Hwaseong IBK Altos 화성 IBK기업은행 알토스
- Full name: Hwaseong IBK Industrial Bank Altos Volleyball Team 화성 IBK기업은행 알토스 배구단
- Short name: IBK
- Founded: 2011; 15 years ago
- Ground: Hwaseong Indoor Arena; Hwaseong, South Korea (Capacity: 5,158)
- Owner: Industrial Bank of Korea
- Chairman: Cho Joon-hee
- Manager: Masayoshi Manabe
- Captain: Hwang Min-kyoung
- League: V-League
- 2025−26: Regular season: 5th Postseason: Did not qualify
- Website: Club home page

Uniforms
Home	Away

Hwaseong IBK Altos (Korean: 화성 IBK 기업은행 알토스) is a South Korean women's professional volleyball team founded in 2011. In the 2012−13 V-League season, just one year after the team was founded, the club won both the regular season title, having won 25 out of 30 regular season games, and its first championship. The club became the first Korean professional sports team to win a championship title in their second season. Since then, the Altos have won two more championships, in the 2014–15 and 2016–17 seasons. They are based in Hwaseong and are members of the Korea Volleyball Federation (KOVO). Their home arena is Hwaseong Indoor Arena in Hwaseong.

== Honours ==
=== Domestic ===
- V-League

Regular season champions (3): 2012−13, 2013−14, 2015−16
Regular season runners-up (3): 2014–15, 2016–17, 2017–18
Championship winners (3): 2012−13, 2014−15, 2016–17
Championship runners-up (3): 2013−14, 2015−16, 2017–18

- KOVO Cup

Winners (4): 2013, 2015, 2016, 2025
Runners-up (2): 2012, 2023

=== International ===
- VTV International Women's Volleyball Cup

Third place: 2012

== Season-by-season records ==
V-League record
Season	Postseason	Regular season				
Season	Postseason	Rank	Games	Won	Lost	Points
2011–12	Did not qualify	4	30	13	17	42
2012–13	Champions	1	30	25	5	73
2013–14	Runners-up	1	30	24	6	70
2014–15	Champions	2	30	20	10	56
2015–16	Runners-up	1	30	20	10	59
2016–17	Champions	2	30	18	12	56
2017–18	Runners-up	2	30	21	9	61
2018–19	Did not qualify	4	30	16	14	50
2019–20	Cancelled	5	27	8	19	25
2020–21	Playoff	3	30	14	16	42
2021–22	Cancelled	5	32	11	21	31
2022–23	Did not qualify	6	36	15	21	48
2023–24	Did not qualify	5	36	17	19	51
2024–25	Did not qualify	4	36	15	21	47
2025–26	Did not qualify	5	36	18	18	57
