= Korea Expressway Corporation Hi-Pass =

South Korean women's volleyball team

Gimcheon Korea Expressway Corporation Hi-Pass 김천 한국도로공사 하이패스
- Full name: Gimcheon Korea Expressway Corporation Hi-Pass Women's Volleyball Club 김천 한국도로공사 하이패스 배구단
- Founded: 1970; 56 years ago
- Ground: Gimcheon Gymnasium; Gimcheon, North Gyeongsang Province, South Korea (Capacity: 5,145)
- Owner: Korea Expressway Corporation
- Manager: Kim Jong-min
- Captain: Yim Myung-ok
- League: V-League
- 2025–26: Regular season: 1st Postseason: Runners-up
- Website: Club home page

Uniforms
Home	Away

Gimcheon Korea Expressway Corporation Hi-Pass (Korean: 김천 한국도로공사 하이패스) is a South Korean professional women's volleyball team. The team was founded in 1970 and became fully professional in 2005. They are based in Gimcheon and are members of the Korea Volleyball Federation (KOVO). Their home arena is Gimcheon Gymnasium in Gimcheon.

== Honours ==
=== Domestic ===
- Korea Volleyball Super League

Runners-up (2): 2003, 2004

- V-League

Champions (2): 2017−18, 2022–23
Runners-up (5): 2005, 2005−06, 2014−15, 2018−19, 2025–26

- KOVO Cup

Winners (1): 2011
Runners-up (7): 2006, 2008, 2010, 2017, 2022, 2025, 2026

=== Continental ===
- AVC Club Volleyball Championship

Third place: 2005

== Season-by-season records ==
V-League record
League	Season	Postseason	Regular season				
League	Season	Postseason	Rank	Games	Won	Lost	Points
V-League	2005	Runners-up	1	16	12	4	—
V-League	2005–06	Runners-up	2	28	17	11	—
V-League	2006–07	Playoff	2	24	16	8	—
V-League	2007–08	Did not qualify	4	28	11	17	—
V-League	2008–09	Did not qualify	5	28	8	20	—
V-League	2009–10	Did not qualify	5	28	4	24	—
V-League	2010–11	Playoff	2	24	15	9	—
V-League	2011–12	Playoff	2	30	19	11	49
V-League	2012–13	Did not qualify	4	30	17	13	48
V-League	2013–14	Did not qualify	4	30	13	17	38
V-League	2014–15	Runners-up	1	30	20	10	59
V-League	2015–16	Did not qualify	5	30	13	17	41
V-League	2016–17	Did not qualify	6	30	11	19	33
V-League	2017–18	Champions	1	30	21	9	62
V-League	2018–19	Runners-up	2	30	20	10	56
V-League	2019–20	Cancelled	6	26	7	19	22
V-League	2020–21	Did not qualify	4	30	13	17	41
V-League	2021–22	Cancelled	2	32	24	8	70
V-League	2022–23	Champions	3	36	20	16	60
V-League	2023–24	Did not qualify	6	36	12	24	39
V-League	2024–25	Did not qualify	5	36	17	19	46
V-League	2025–26	Runners-up	1	36	24	12	69
