= Suwon KEPCO Vixtorm =

South Korean volleyball team

Suwon KEPCO Vixtorm 수원 한국전력 빅스톰
- Full name: Suwon Korea Electric Power Corporation Vixtorm Volleyball Team 수원 한국전력 빅스톰 배구단
- Founded: 1945; 81 years ago
- Ground: Suwon Gymnasium; Suwon, South Korea (Capacity: 5,145)
- Owner: Korea Electric Power Corporation
- Chairman: Kim Dong-cheol
- Manager: Suk Jin-wook
- Captain: Seo Jae-duck
- League: V-League
- 2025–26: Regular season: 5th Postseason: Did not qualify
- Website: Club home page

Uniforms
Home	Away

Suwon KEPCO Vixtorm (Korean: 수원 한국전력 빅스톰) is a South Korean volleyball team. The team was founded in 1945 and became fully professional in 2008. They are based in Suwon and are members of the Korea Volleyball Federation (KOVO). Their home arena is Suwon Gymnasium in Suwon.

== Players ==
Roster for the 2024–25 season

No.	Name	Date of birth	Position
1	(South Korea) Seo Jae-duck	July 21, 1989 (age 37)	Outside hitter
2	(South Korea) Kim Joo-young	August 10, 2004 (age 22)	Setter
4	(South Korea) Gu Kyo-hyuk	November 9, 2000 (age 25)	Outside hitter
5	(South Korea) Lee Won-jung	April 6, 1995 (age 31)	Setter
6	(Japan) Nakano Yamato	October 2, 1999 (age 27)	Setter
7	(South Korea) Shin Seong-ho	February 3, 2001 (age 25)	Outside hitter
8	(South Korea) Park Seung-su	January 30, 2002 (age 24)	Outside hitter
9	(South Korea) Lim Sung-jin	January 11, 1999 (age 27)	Outside hitter
10	(Cuba) Luis Estrada	March 10, 2000 (age 26)	Opposite spiker
11	(South Korea) Jo Geun-ho	May 23, 1990 (age 36)	Middle blocker
12	(South Korea) Lee Ji-seok	February 5, 1998 (age 28)	Libero
14	(South Korea) Kang Woo-seok	January 16, 1999 (age 27)	Outside hitter
16	(South Korea) Kim Dong-young	July 2, 1996 (age 30)	Opposite spiker
18	(South Korea) Jeon Jin-seon	September 11, 1996 (age 30)	Middle blocker
20	(South Korea) Jung Sung-hwan	February 23, 1996 (age 30)	Middle blocker
21	(South Korea) Kim Gun-hee	July 21, 2002 (age 24)	Libero
24	(South Korea) Shin Yung-suk (C)	October 4, 1986 (age 40)	Middle blocker
77	(South Korea) Yoon Ha-jun	March 25, 2006 (age 20)	Outside hitter

== Honours ==
- KOVO Cup

Winners (3): 2016, 2017, 2020
Runners-up (1): 2022

== Season-by-season records ==
Suwon KEPCO Vixtorm
League	Season	Postseason	Regular season				
League	Season	Postseason	Rank	Games	Won	Lost	Points
V-League	2005	Did not qualify	5	20	6	14	—
V-League	2005–06	Did not qualify	6	35	3	32	—
V-League	2006–07	Did not qualify	5	30	6	24	—
V-League	2007–08	Did not qualify	6	35	4	31	—
V-League	2008–09	Did not qualify	6	35	4	31	—
V-League	2009–10	Did not qualify	6	36	8	28	—
V-League	2010–11	Did not qualify	5	30	10	20	—
V-League	2011–12	Semi-playoff	4	36	18	18	52
V-League	2012–13	Did not qualify	6	30	2	28	7
V-League	2013–14	Did not qualify	7	30	7	23	24
V-League	2014–15	Playoff	3	36	23	13	65
V-League	2015–16	Did not qualify	5	36	14	22	47
V-League	2016–17	Playoff	3	36	22	14	62
V-League	2017–18	Did not qualify	5	36	17	19	54
V-League	2018–19	Did not qualify	7	36	4	32	19
V-League	2019–20	Cancelled	7	32	6	26	24
V-League	2020–21	Did not qualify	5	36	18	18	55
V-League	2021–22	Playoff	4	36	20	16	56
V-League	2022–23	Playoff	4	36	17	19	53
V-League	2023–24	Did not qualify	5	36	18	18	53
V-League	2024–25	Did not qualify	6	36	13	23	35
V-League	2025–26	Did not qualify	5	36	19	17	56
