= Gwangju AI Peppers =

South Korean women's professional volleyball team

Gwangju AI Peppers 광주 AI 페퍼스
- Founded: 2021; 5 years ago
- Dissolved: 2026; 0 years ago
- Ground: Yeomju Gymnasium; Gwangju, South Korea (Capacity: 8,500)
- Owner: Pepper Savings Bank

Uniforms
Home	Away

Gwangju AI Peppers (Korean: 광주 AI 페퍼스) was a South Korean women's professional volleyball team, founded in 2021. They were based in Gwangju and were members of the Korea Volleyball Federation (KOVO). Their home arena was Yeomju Gymnasium in Gwangju.

After the 2025–26 season, the team was disbanded after it was acquired by video live streaming service SOOP, which formed a new club called SOOP SOOPers.

== Season-by-season records ==
V-League record
League	Season	Postseason	Regular season				
League	Season	Postseason	Rank	Games	Won	Lost	Points
V-League	2021–22	Cancelled	7	31	3	28	11
V-League	2022–23	Did not qualify	7	36	5	31	14
V-League	2023–24	Did not qualify	7	36	5	31	17
V-League	2024–25	Did not qualify	7	36	11	25	35
V-League	2025–26	Did not qualify	6	36	16	20	47
