= Kang Sung-hyung =

South Korean volleyball player (born 1970)

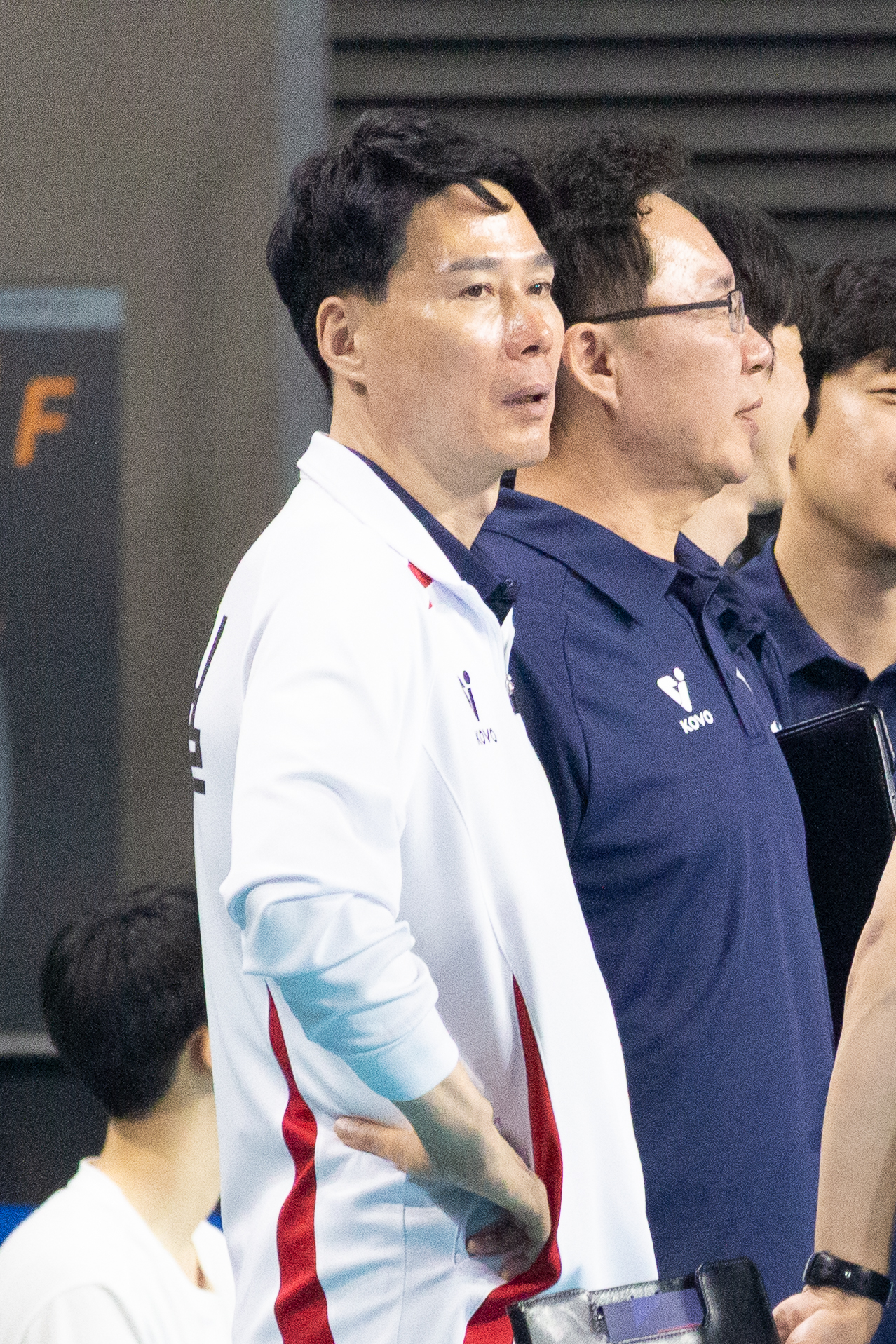
- Kang Sung-hyung in 2025

Personal information
- Nationality: South Korean
- Born: 7 May 1970 (age 55)

Sport
- Sport: Volleyball

Kang Sung-hyung (born 7 May 1970) is a South Korean volleyball player. He competed in the men's tournament at the 1992 Summer Olympics.
