= Jelena Mladjenović =

Bosnian volleyball player

Personal information
- Nationality: (Bosnia and Herzegovina) Bosnian
- Born: 30 May 1997 (age 29)
- Height: 1.96 m (6 ft 5 in)
- Weight: 88 kg (194 lb)

Volleyball information
- Position: Opposite
- Current club: (South Korea) Incheon Heungkuk Pink Spiders
- Number: 13

Career
Years	Teams
2017–2019; 2019-2020- 2020–2021; 2021-	(Serbia) OK Železničar (Russia) Sparta Nizhny Novgorod (Turkey) Çukurova Belediyespor (South Korea) Daejeon KGC

National team
Bosnia and Herzegovina

Jelena Mladjenović (born 30 May 1997) is a Bosnian volleyball player who has played in Europe and South Korea.

She currently plays for Incheon Heungkuk Pink Spiders in the Korean V-League.
