= Gyeyang Gymnasium =

Gymnasium in Incheon, South Korea

Gyeyang Gymnasium 계양체육관
- Interactive map of Gyeyang Gymnasium 계양체육관
- Location: Gyeyang District, Incheon, South Korea
- Capacity: 4,270

Tenants
- Incheon Korean Air Jumbos (2013–); Incheon Heungkuk Life Pink Spiders (2013–2021)

- Gyeyang Gymnasium
- Hangul: 계양체육관
- Hanja: 桂陽體育館
- RR: Gyeyang cheyukgwan
- MR: Kyeyang ch'eyukkwan

Gyeyang Gymnasium (Korean: 계양체육관) is an indoor arena located Gyeyang District, Incheon, South Korea. It is built to host badminton and karate competitions of 2014 Asian Games.
