= Hwaseong Sports Complex Town =

Sport complex in Gyeonggi, South Korea

- Hwaseong Indoor Arena during the 2014 Asian Games
- Interactive map of Hwaseong Sports Complex Town
- Location: 470, Hyangnam-ro, Hyangnam-eup, Hwaseong, South Korea
- Coordinates: 37°08′15″N 126°55′29″E
- Owner: Hwaseong City Hall
- Operator: Hwaseong City Corporation
- Capacity: 35,265 (stadium); 5,158 (indoor arena)
- Surface: Natural grass
- Field size: 105 by 68 metres (115 by 74 yards)

Construction
- Built: 9 January 2009 – 29 May 2011
- Opened: 1 October 2011
- Cost: $175 million (stadium)

Tenants
- Stadium: Hwaseong FC (2013–present); Indoor Arena: Hwaseong IBK Altos (2011–present)

Hwaseong Sports Complex Town (Korean: 화성종합경기타운) is a group of sports facilities in Hwaseong, Gyeonggi, South Korea. The complex consists of Hwaseong Stadium, Hwaseong Indoor Arena, and an auxiliary stadium.

== Facilities ==
=== Hwaseong Stadium ===
The Hwaseong Stadium is a multi-use stadium, completed in 2011. It is used mostly for football matches. The stadium can accommodate 35,265 spectators.

The stadium cost $175 million to build and is the home ground of Hwaseong FC, a professional team competing in the K League 2, the second tier of the South Korean football league system. It hosted multiple matches of the South Korea national team, including a 2018 FIFA World Cup qualifier against Laos and a 2022 FIFA World Cup qualifier against Sri Lanka. The stadium has also hosted football matches at the 2013 EAFF East Asian Cup and the 2014 Asian Games.

=== Hwaseong Indoor Arena ===
The Hwaseong Indoor Arena is the home gymnasium of the women's professional volleyball team Hwaseong IBK Altos, competing in the V-League.
