= Suwon Gymnasium =

Sports venue in Suwon, South Korea

- Interactive map of Suwon Gymnasium
- Location: 775 Jowon-dong, Jangan-gu, Suwon, Gyeonggi-do, South Korea
- Coordinates: 37.298401°N 127.009071°E
- Owner: City of Suwon
- Operator: Suwon City Facility Management Corporation
- Capacity: 5,145
- Field size: 21,796 square feet (2,024.9 m^{2})

Construction
- Opened: 1984

Tenants
- Suwon Samsung Thunders (1997–2001); Suwon Samsung Life Bichumi (2001–2005); Suwon KEPCO Vixtorm (2006–present); Suwon Hyundai E&C Hillstate (2006–present)

Suwon Gymnasium is an indoor sporting arena located in Suwon, South Korea. Built in 1984 to host handball events at the 1988 Summer Olympics, the gymnasium has a capacity of 5,145 spectators. At the 2014 Asian Games, the gymnasium hosted handball and table tennis matches. In 2021, the KT Sonicboom men's basketball team relocated from Busan to Suwon. Today, Suwon Gymnasium is part of the Suwon Sports Complex.

== Gallery ==
Exterior

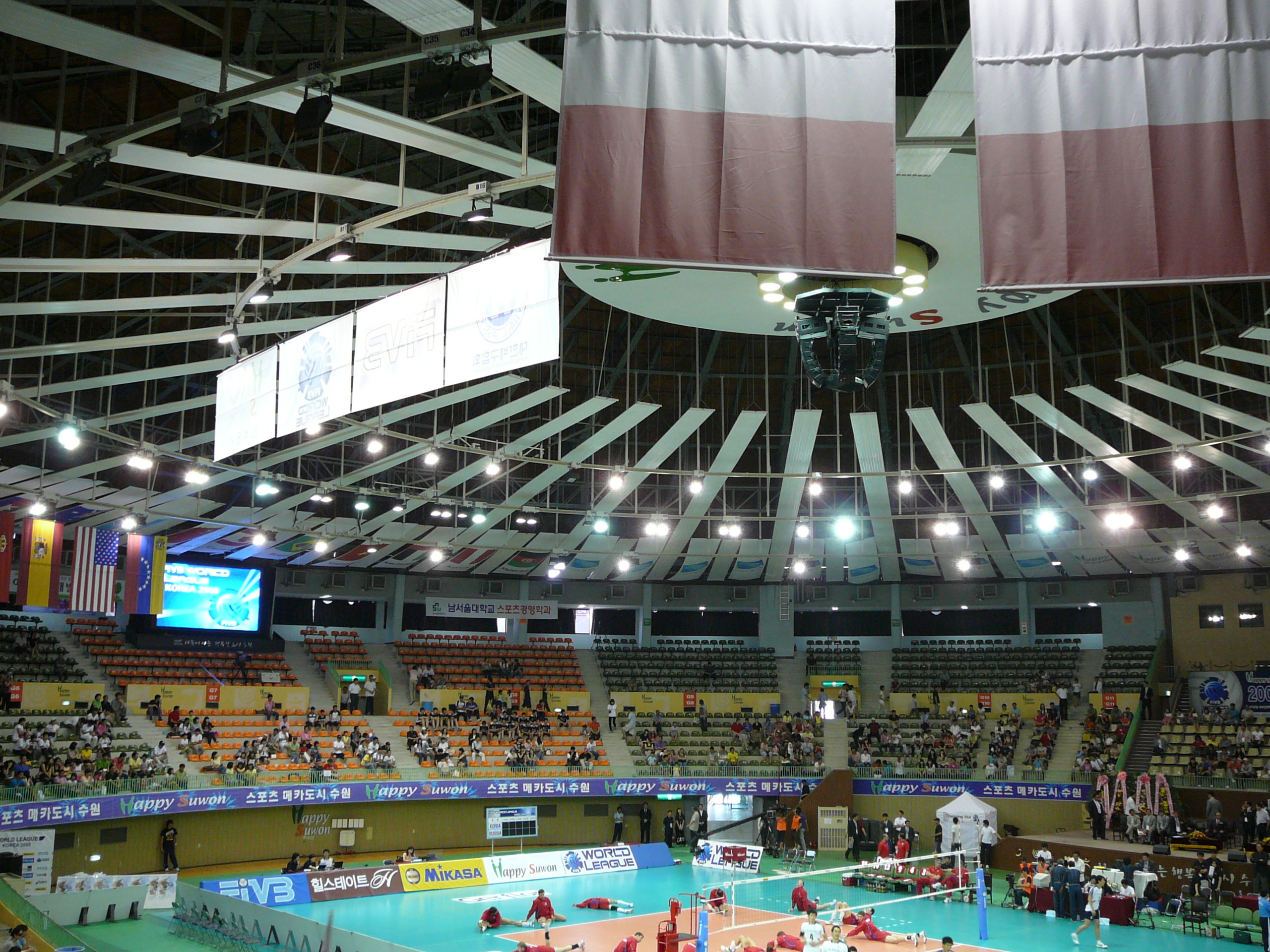
Interior

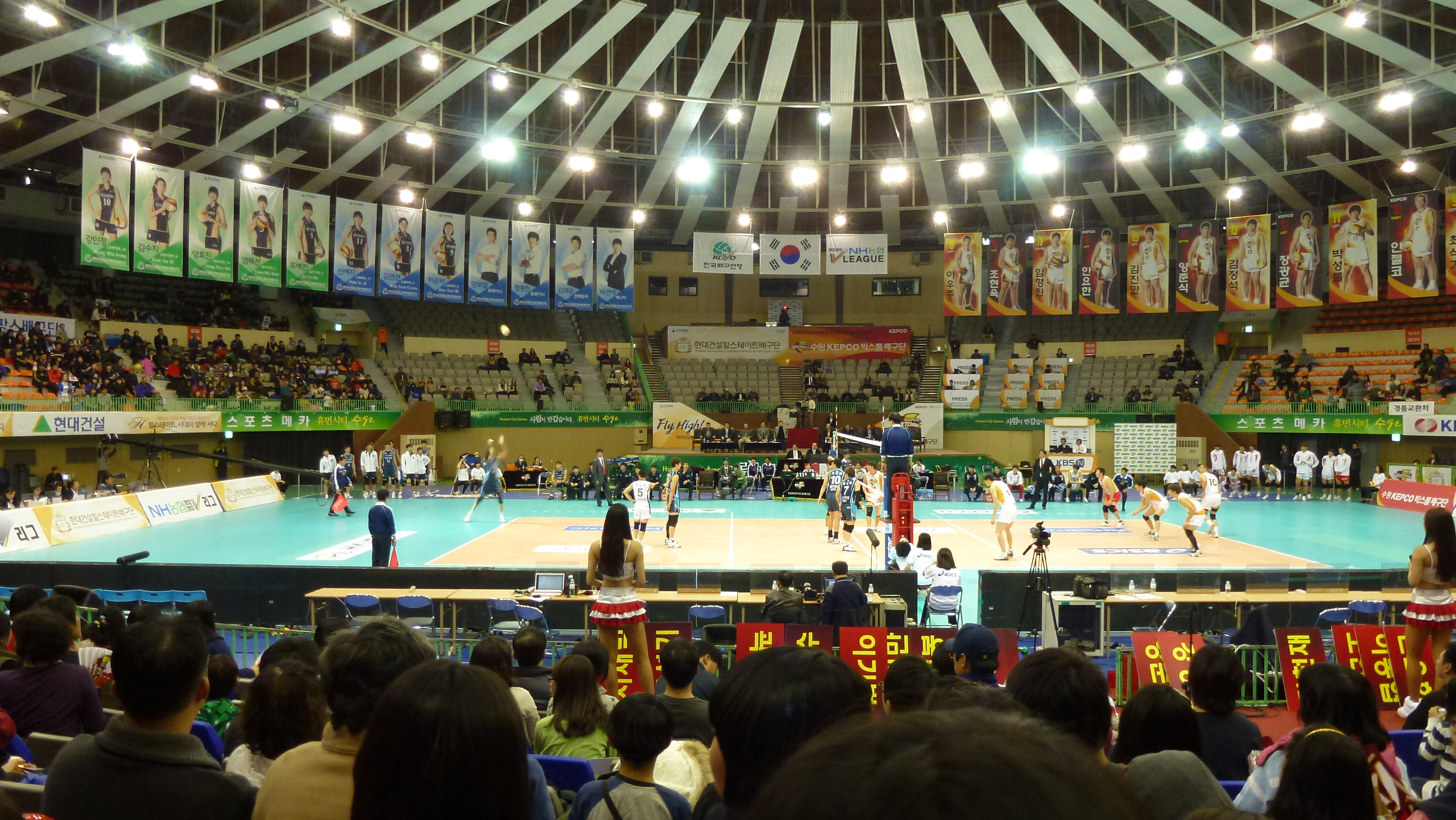
Interior during the V-League match
