= Daejeon Hanbat Sports Complex =

Sports venue in Daejeon, South Korea

Coordinates: 36°18′58″N 127°25′54″E

- Hangul: 대전한밭종합운동장
- Hanja: 大田한밭綜合運動場
- RR: Daejeon Hanbat jonghap undongjang
- MR: Taejŏn Hanbat chonghap undongjang

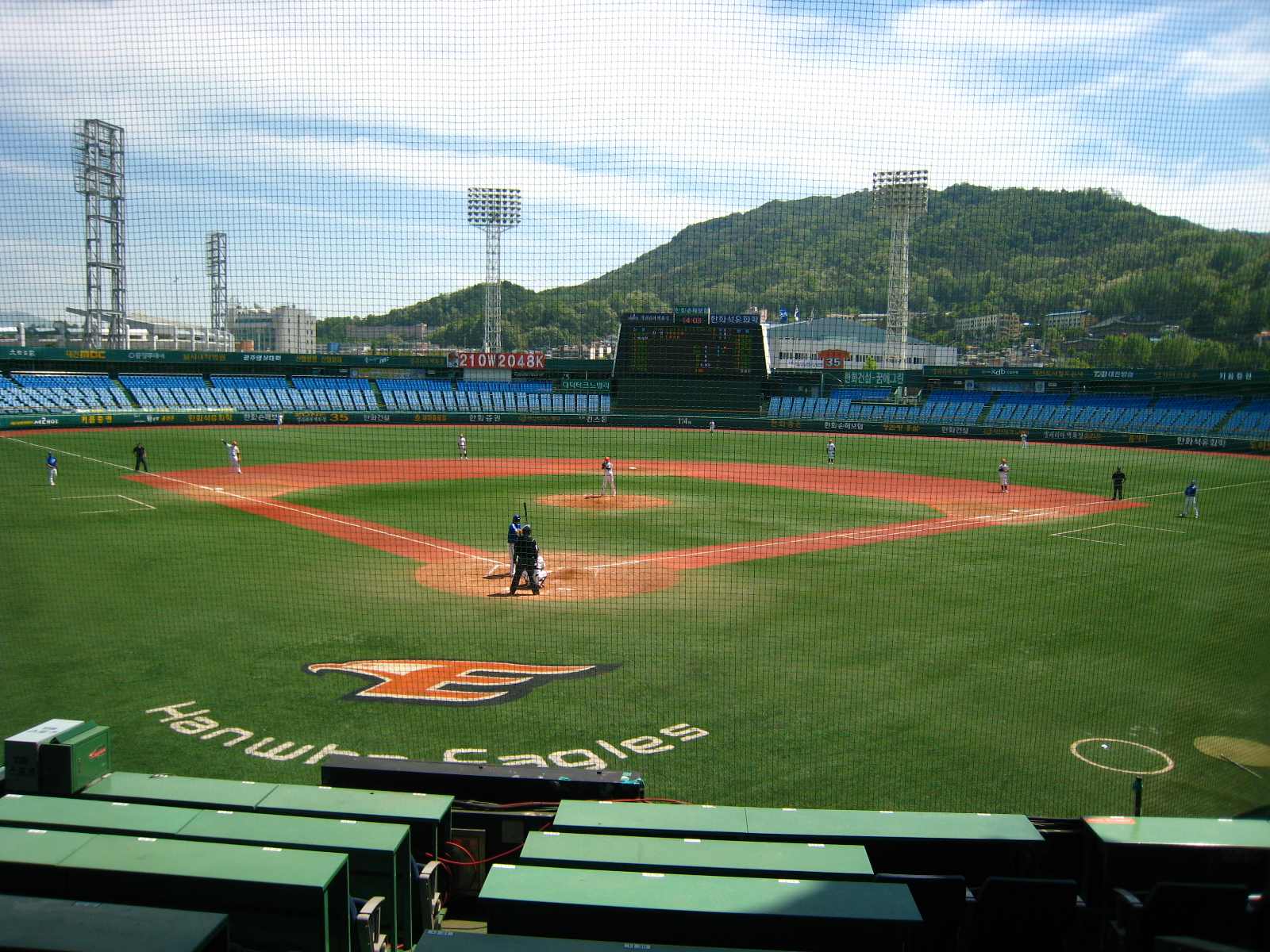
Hanbat Ballpark

Daejeon Hanbat Sports Complex (Korean: 대전한밭종합운동장) is a sports complex, comprising a multi-purpose stadium (including athletic facilities and a soccer pitch), a ballpark, Basketball courts, tennis courts and various other sports facilities in Daejeon, South Korea.

== Facilities ==
=== Daejeon Hanbat Stadium ===
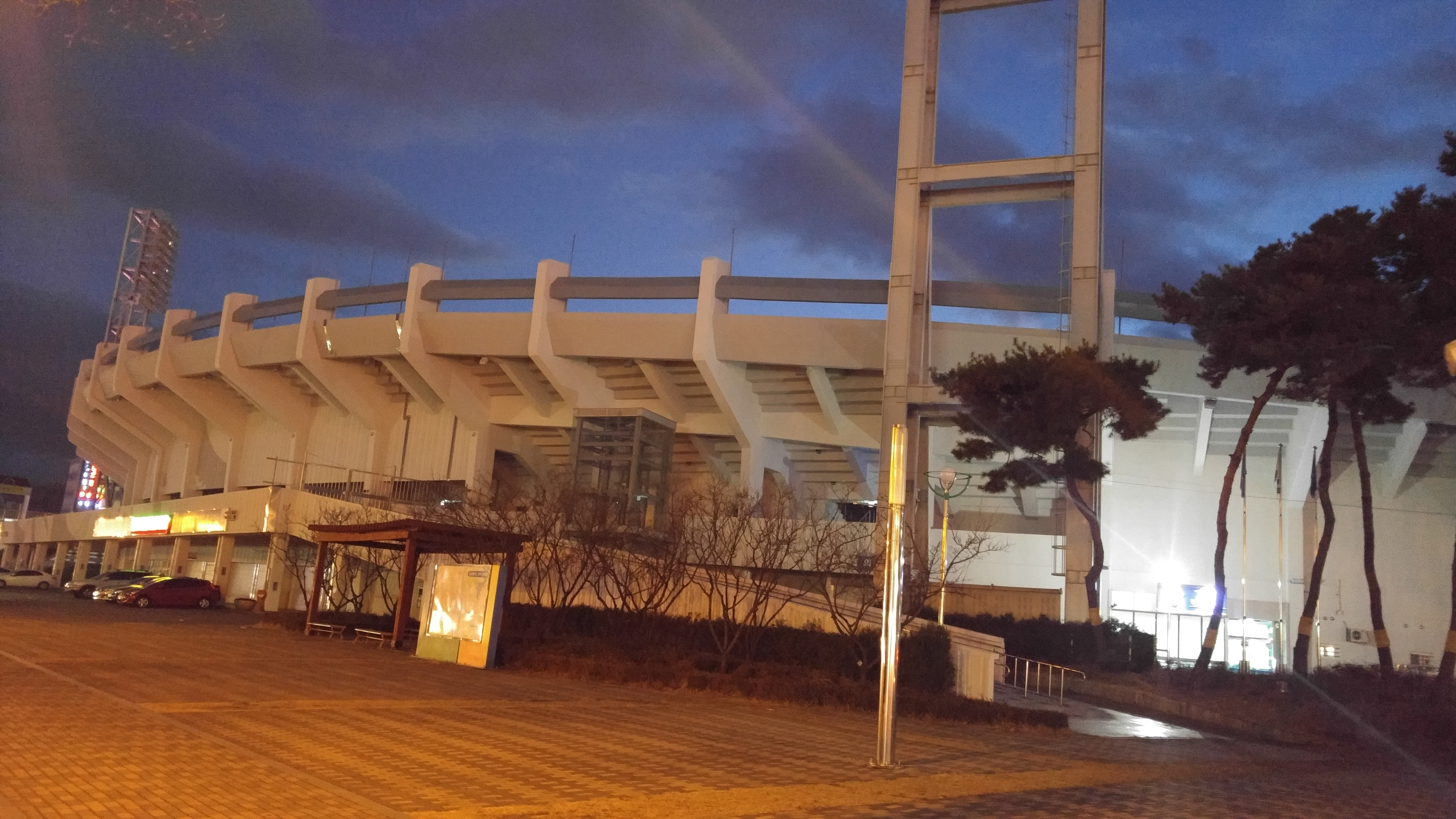
Hanbat Main Stadium

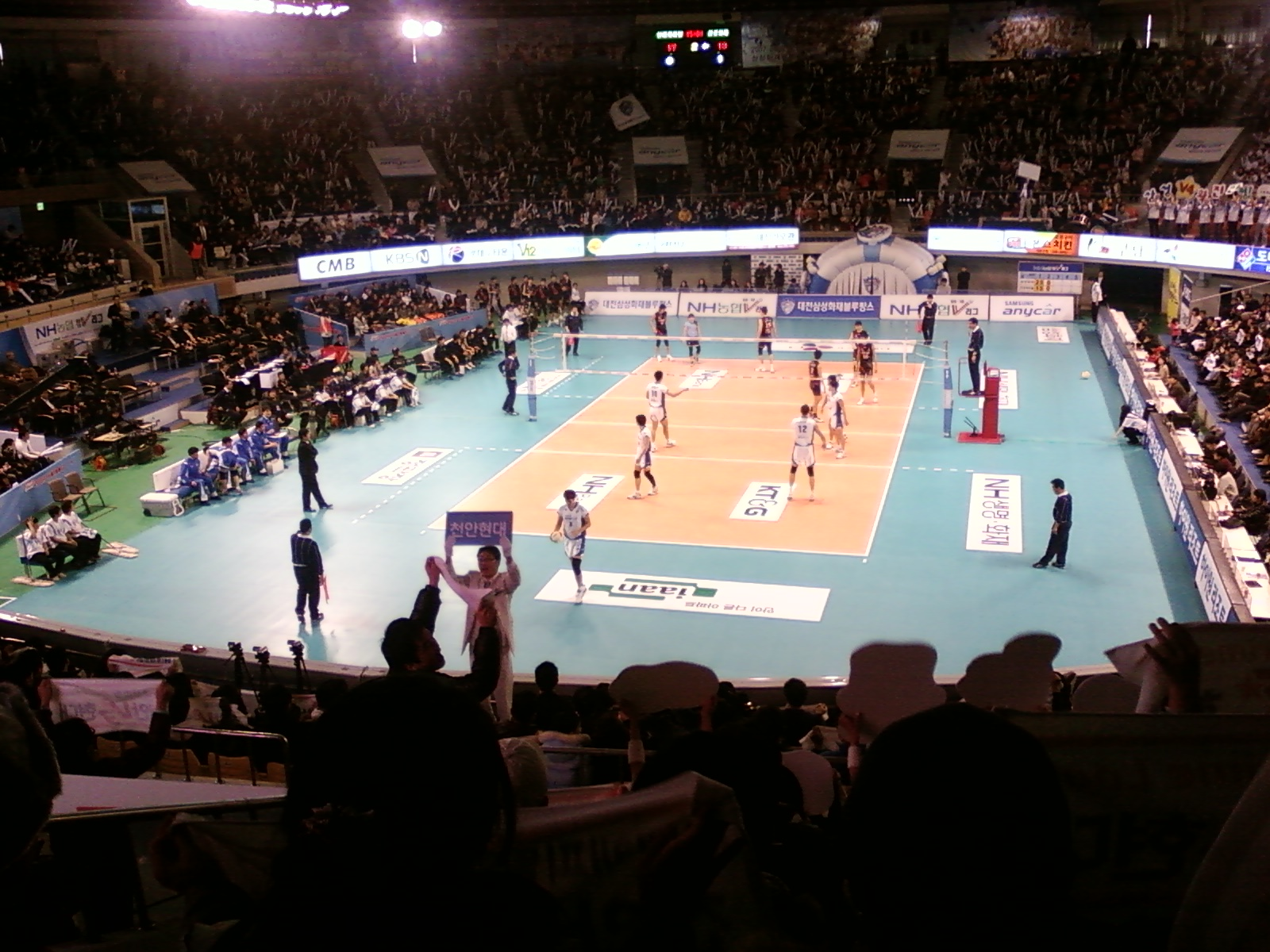
Chungmu Indoor Gymnasium

The Daejeon stadium (main stadium) has a capacity of 20,618 and opened in 1964. It was used by Daejeon Citizens before Daejeon World Cup Stadium opened and the team relocated in 2001. It hosted several football preliminaries during the 1988 Summer Olympics in Seoul.

=== Daejeon Baseball Stadium ===
Daejeon Hanbat Baseball Stadium was opened in 1965, and undergone a significant renovation and expansion in 2012. It now has a capacity of 13,500, and served as home for Hanwha Eagles of Korea Professional Baseball League until 2024.

=== Chungmu Gymnasium ===
Chungmu Gymnasium is an indoor sports facility that can be used as basketball, or volleyball stadium. It currently serves as home for Samsung Fire Bluefangs and Daejeon KGC of V-League.

=== Others ===
- Multi-purpose Gymnasium (capacity: 2,000)
- Tennis courts (capacity: 384)
- Auxiliary soccer pitch (capacity: 1,000)
- Auxiliary training facilities
- Gateball court

== Name ==
Hanbat is the original Korean name of the City of Daejeon. Han means Big and Bat means Field, hence the name of the city where the stadium rests today is a transliteration of the hanja Dae (big) and Jeon (field).
