= Jangchung Arena =

Sports arena in Seoul, South Korea

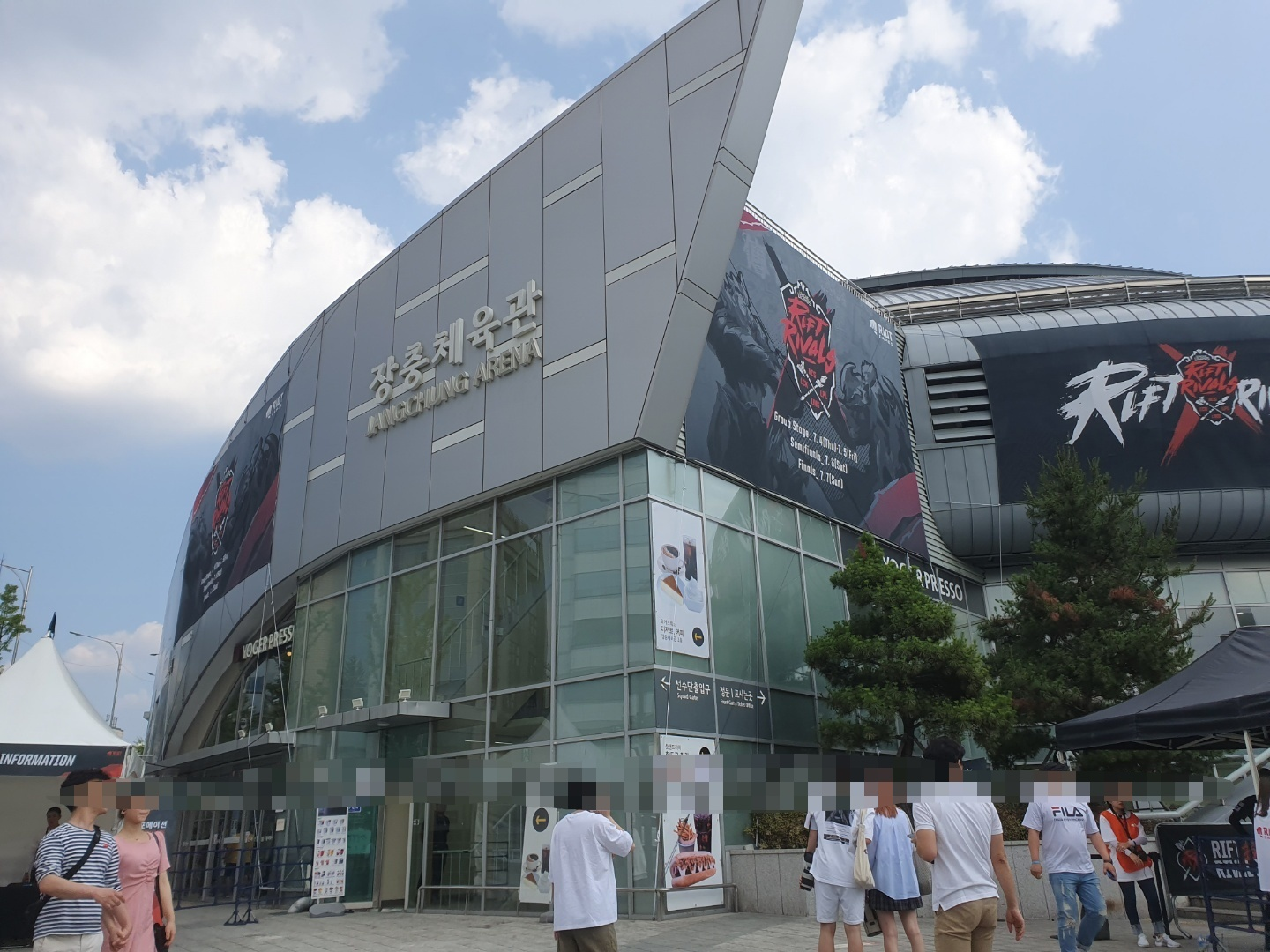
- Jangchung Arena in 2019
- Interactive map of Jangchung Arena
- Former names: Jangchung Gymnasium (1963–2016)
- Location: Jung District, Seoul, South Korea
- Coordinates: 37°33′29″N 127°0′24″E
- Operator: City of Seoul (1963–2007); Dongwon Enterprise (2007–2015); Seoul Metropolitan Facilities Management Corporation (2015–present)
- Capacity: 4,507
- Field size: 11,399 square metres (122,700 sq ft)

Construction
- Built: 1959–1963
- Opened: 1 February 1963
- Renovated: 1988, 2001, 2012–2014
- Expanded: 1973, 1988
- Architect: Kim Jung-soo

Tenants
- Seoul Woori Card Woori Won (2009–2013, 2015–present); GS Caltex Seoul Kixx (2009–present)

Website
- Official website

The Jangchung Arena (Korean: 장충체육관) is an indoor sporting arena located in Jung District, Seoul, South Korea. Volleyball teams GS Caltex Seoul Kixx and Seoul Woori Card Woori Won are the tenants.

== History ==
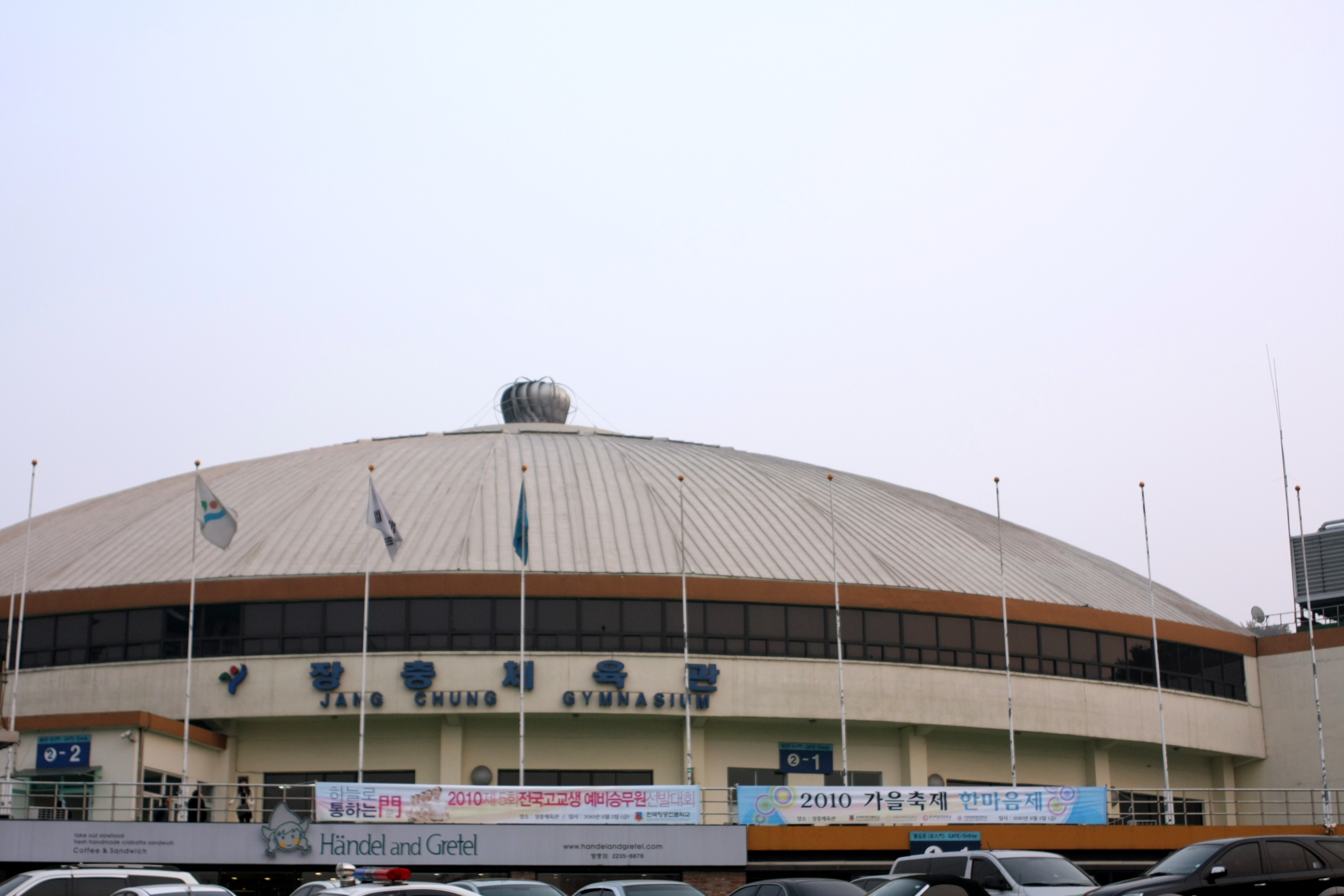
Jangchung Gymnasium before remodeling

At first, the arena was an army gymnasium, built on 23 June 1955. It was later fully reconstructed and opened on 1 February 1963. In 1966, the venue hosted a boxing match between Kim Ki-soo and Nino Benvenuti, where Kim became the first South Korean to win the boxing world championships. During the 1970s, the venue hosted the presidential elections and inaugurations of Park Chung Hee and Choi Kyu-hah. The venue hosted judo and taekwondo events at the 1988 Summer Olympics. After the 2012–2014 renovation, the capacity of the arena is 4,507.

== Transport connections ==
=== Metro ===
The stadium is accessible from the Seoul Metropolitan Subway. The closest station to the stadium is Dongguk University Exit 5, on Line 3, located 180 meters from the stadium.

=== Bus ===
The bus lines with a stop close to Jangchung Gymnasium:

- 7212 – Eunpyeong Garage/Oksu-Dong
- 6211 – Sinweol-Dong/Sangwangshimni Station
- 2233 – Myeonmok-Dong/Oksu-Dong
- 144 – Ui-Dong/Seoul National University of Education
- 301 – Jangji Garage/Hyehwa-Dong

== FIVB Volleyball World League ==
The arena was one of the venues at the 2016 and 2017 editions of the FIVB Volleyball World League, and held the following matches:

=== 2016 FIVB Volleyball World League ===
Date	Time		Score		Set 1	Set 2	Set 3	Set 4	Set 5	Total	Report
1 Jul	16:03	South Korea	3–0	Czech Republic	25–18	25–21	25–20			75–59	P2 P3
1 Jul	18:31	Egypt	1–3	Netherlands	19–25	25–21	18–25	16–25		78–96	P2 P3
2 Jul	14:02	South Korea	3–2	Egypt	26–24	25–20	23–25	28–30	15–13	117–112	P2 P3
2 Jul	17:20	Czech Republic	1–3	Netherlands	20–25	26–24	23–25	16–25		85–99	P2 P3
3 Jul	14:00	South Korea	3–2	Netherlands	25–16	22–25	21–25	25–21	18–16	111–103	P2 P3
3 Jul	17:01	Czech Republic	3–0	Egypt	25–19	32–30	25–23			82–72	P2 P3

=== 2017 FIVB Volleyball World League ===
Date	Time		Score		Set 1	Set 2	Set 3	Set 4	Set 5	Total	Report
2 Jun	16:00	Finland	1–3	Slovenia	22–25	15–25	25–22	23–25		85–97	P2 P3
2 Jun	19:00	South Korea	3–2	Czech Republic	25–17	23–25	24–26	25–19	15–12	112–99	P2 P3
3 Jun	13:00	South Korea	1–3	Slovenia	23–25	25–23	14–25	23–25		85–98	P2 P3
3 Jun	15:30	Czech Republic	3–1	Finland	16–25	25–23	25–22	25–16		91–86	P2 P3
4 Jun	12:00	Slovenia	3–1	Czech Republic	25–19	25–21	23–25	25–16		98–81	P2 P3
4 Jun	14:40	South Korea	3–2	Finland	24–26	25–21	25–23	22–25	15–13	111–108	P2 P3

== See also ==
- List of indoor arenas in South Korea
