= Korea Volleyball Federation =

Governing body of volleyball in South Korea

- KOVO Former Logo (2014-2024)
- Formation: October 2004
- Type: Sports organization
- Headquarters: Sangam-dong, Mapo-gu, Seoul
- Official language: Korean
- Commissioner: Lee Ho-jin
- Website: KOVO.co.kr

The Korea Volleyball Federation (KOVO) (hangul : 한국배구연맹) is the governing body for the professional competitions of volleyball in South Korea. It runs the V-League and KOVO Cup.

== See also ==
- V-League
- KOVO Cup
