= 2013–14 V-League (South Korea) =

V League
- Season: 2013–14
- Dates: 2 November 2013 – 5 April 2014

The 2013–14 V-League season was the 10th season of the V-League, the highest professional volleyball league in South Korea. The season started on 2 November 2013 and finished on 5 April 2014. Daejeon Samsung Bluefangs were the defending champions in the men's league and Hwaseong IBK Altos the defending female champions.

== Teams ==
=== Men's clubs ===
Location of teams in V-League Men's Clubs

| Team | Location | Stadium | Capacity |
|---|---|---|---|
| Ansan OK Savings Bank Rush & Cash | Ansan | Sangnoksu Gymnasium | 2,700 |
| Cheonan Hyundai Capital Skywalkers | Cheonan | Yu Gwan-sun Gymnasium | 5,482 |
| Daejeon Samsung Bluefangs | Daejeon | Chungmu Gymnasium | 5,000 |
| Gumi LIG Greaters | Gumi | Park Jeong-hee Gymnasium | 6,277 |
| Incheon Korean Air Jumbos | Incheon | Gyeyang Gymnasium | 5,000 Incheon Korean Air Jumbos |
| Asan Woori Card Hansae | Asan | Yi Sun-sin Icerink Gymnasium | 3,303 Asan Woori Bank Wibee |
| Suwon KEPCO Vixtorm | Suwon | Suwon Gymnasium | 4,317 |

=== Women's clubs ===
Location of teams in V-League Women's Clubs

| Team | Location | Stadium | Capacity |
|---|---|---|---|
| Daejeon KGC | Daejeon | Chungmu Gymnasium | 5,000 |
| Seongnam Korea Expressway Hi-pass | Seongnam | Seongnam Gymnasium | 5,711 Seongnam Sports Complex |
| Gumi GS Caltex KIXX | Gumi | Park Jeong-hee Gymnasium | 6,277 |
| Hwaseong IBK Altos | Hwaseong | Hwaseong Gymnasium | 5,152 Hwaseong IBK Altos |
| Incheon Heungkuk Life Pink Spiders | Incheon | Gyeyang Gymnasium | 5,000 Incheon Korean Air Jumbos |
| Suwon Hyundai Hillstate | Suwon | Suwon Gymnasium | 4,317 |

== Season standing procedure ==
1. Match points
2. Number of matches won
3. Sets ratio
4. Points ratio
5. Result of the last match between the tied teams

Match won 3–0 or 3–1: 3 match points for the winner, 0 match points for the loser
Match won 3–2: 2 match points for the winner, 1 match point for the loser

== Regular season ==
=== League table (men's) ===
| Pos | Team | Pld | W | L | Pts | SR | SPR | Qualification |
|---|---|---|---|---|---|---|---|---|
| 1 | Daejeon Samsung Bluefangs | 30 | 23 | 7 | 66 | 1.875 | 1.101 | Finals |
| 2 | Cheonan Hyundai Skywalkers | 30 | 21 | 9 | 61 | 1.578 | 1.042 | Semifinals |
| 3 | Incheon Korean Air Jumbos | 30 | 16 | 14 | 50 | 1.240 | 1.015 | Semifinals |
| 4 | Asan Woori Card Hansae | 30 | 15 | 15 | 43 | 0.965 | 0.988 | |
| 5 | Gumi LIG Greaters | 30 | 12 | 18 | 37 | 0.691 | 0.948 | |
| 6 | Ansan Rush & Cash | 30 | 11 | 19 | 34 | 0.754 | 0.974 | |
| 7 | Suwon KEPCO Vixtorm | 30 | 7 | 23 | 24 | 0.558 | 0.941 | |

=== League table (women's) ===
| Pos | Team | Pld | W | L | Pts | SR | SPR | Qualification |
|---|---|---|---|---|---|---|---|---|
| 1 | Hwaseong IBK Altos | 30 | 24 | 6 | 70 | 2.533 | 1.140 | Finals |
| 2 | Gumi GS Caltex KIXX | 30 | 20 | 10 | 57 | 1.548 | 1.077 | Semifinals |
| 3 | Daejeon KGC | 30 | 14 | 16 | 48 | 1.018 | 0.993 | Semifinals |
| 4 | Seongnam Korea Expressway Hi-pass | 30 | 13 | 17 | 38 | 0.785 | 0.970 | |
| 5 | Suwon Hyundai Hillstate | 30 | 12 | 18 | 38 | 0.852 | 0.973 | |
| 6 | Incheon Heungkuk Life Pink Spiders | 30 | 7 | 23 | 19 | 0.413 | 0.877 | |

== Play-offs ==
=== Bracket (Male) ===
Semifinals
1 | Daejeon Samsung Bluefangs
2 | Cheonan Hyundai Skywalkers | 3 | 3
3 | Incheon Korean Air Jumbos | 0 | 1

Finals
1 | Daejeon Samsung Bluefangs | 0 | 3 | 3 | 3
2 | Cheonan Hyundai Skywalkers | 3 | 1 | 0 | 0

=== Bracket (Female) ===
Semifinals
1 | Hwaseong IBK Altos
2 | Gumi GS Caltex KIXX | 3 | 3
3 | Daejeon KGC | 0 | 1

Finals
1 | Hwaseong IBK Altos | 2 | 3 | 3 | 1 | 1
2 | Gumi GS Caltex KIXX | 3 | 0 | 2 | 3 | 3

== Top Scorers ==
=== Men's ===
| Rank | Player | Club | Points |
|---|---|---|---|
| 1 | (Cuba) Leonardo Leyva | Daejeon Samsung Bluefangs | 1084 |
| 2 | (Colombia) Liberman Agamez | Cheonan Hyundai Capital Skywalkers | 940 |
| 3 | (Cuba) Michael Sánchez | Incheon Korean Air Jumbos | 877 |
| 4 | (Australia) Thomas Edgar | Gumi LIG Greaters | 863 |
| 5 | (South Korea) Jeon Gwang-in | Suwon KEPCO Vixtorm | 616 |
| 6 | (Hungary) Arpad Baroti | Ansan OK Savings Bank Rush & Cash | 562 |
| 7 | (South Korea) Choi Hong-seok | Asan Woori Card Hansae | 430 |
| 8 | (South Korea) Song Myeong-geun | Ansan OK Savings Bank Rush & Cash | 416 |
| 9 | (South Korea) Shin Yeong-su | Incheon Korean Air Jumbos | 402 |
| 10 | (United States) Sean Rooney | Asan Woori Card Hansae | 400 |

=== Women's ===
| Rank | Player | Club | Points |
|---|---|---|---|
| 1 | (Brazil) Joyce Gomes da Silva | Daejeon KGC | 1009 |
| 2 | (Dominican Republic) Bethania de la Cruz | Gumi GS Caltex KIXX | 873 |
| 3 | (United States) Nicole Fawcett | Seongnam Korea Expressway Hi-pass | 843 |
| 4 | (Bulgaria) Elitsa Vasileva | Incheon Heungkuk Life Pink Spiders | 782 |
| 5 | (Puerto Rico) Karina Ocasio | Hwaseong IBK Altos | 710 |
| 6 | (Turkey) Yeliz Başa | Hwaseong IBK Altos | 695 |
| 7 | (South Korea) Yang Hyo-jin | Gumi GS Caltex KIXX | 560 |
| 8 | (South Korea) Kim Hee-jin | Hwaseong IBK Altos | 432 |
| 9 | (South Korea) Park Jeong-ah | Hwaseong IBK Altos | 408 |
| 10 | (South Korea) Baek Mok-hwa | Daejeon KGC | 362 |

== Player of the Round ==
=== Men's ===
| Round | Player | Club |
|---|---|---|
| 1 | (Cuba) Leonardo Leyva | Daejeon Samsung Bluefangs |
| 2 | (South Korea) Choi Hong-seok | Asan Woori Card Hansae |
| 3 | (Colombia) Liberman Agamez | Cheonan Hyundai Capital Skywalkers |
| 4 | (South Korea) Song Myeong-geun | Ansan OK Savings Bank Rush & Cash |
| 5 | (Cuba) Leonardo Leyva | Daejeon Samsung Bluefangs |

=== Women's ===
| Round | Player | Club |
|---|---|---|
| 1 | (Brazil) Joyce Gomes da Silva | Daejeon KGC |
| 2 | (Dominican Republic) Bethania de la Cruz | Gumi GS Caltex KIXX |
| 3 | (Dominican Republic) Bethania de la Cruz | Gumi GS Caltex KIXX |
| 4 | (South Korea) Kim Hee-jin | Hwaseong IBK Altos |
| 5 | (South Korea) Kim Hee-jin | Hwaseong IBK Altos |

== Final standing ==
=== Men's League ===
| Rank | Team |
|---|---|
| 1st place, gold medalist(s) | Daejeon Samsung Bluefangs |
| 2nd place, silver medalist(s) | Cheonan Hyundai Capital Skywalkers |
| 3rd place, bronze medalist(s) | Incheon Korean Air Jumbos |
| 4 | Asan Woori Card Hansae |
| 5 | Uijeongbu KB Insurance Stars |
| 6 | Ansan Rush & Cash |
| 7 | Suwon KEPCO Vixtorm |

=== Women's League ===
| Rank | Team |
|---|---|
| 1st place, gold medalist(s) | Gumi GS Caltex KIXX |
| 2nd place, silver medalist(s) | Hwaseong IBK Altos |
| 3rd place, bronze medalist(s) | Daejeon KGC |
| 4 | Seongnam Korea Expressway Hi-pass |
| 5 | Suwon Hyundai Hillstate |
| 6 | Incheon Heungkuk Life Pink Spiders |
