= Elizabeth McMahon =

American volleyball player (born 1993)

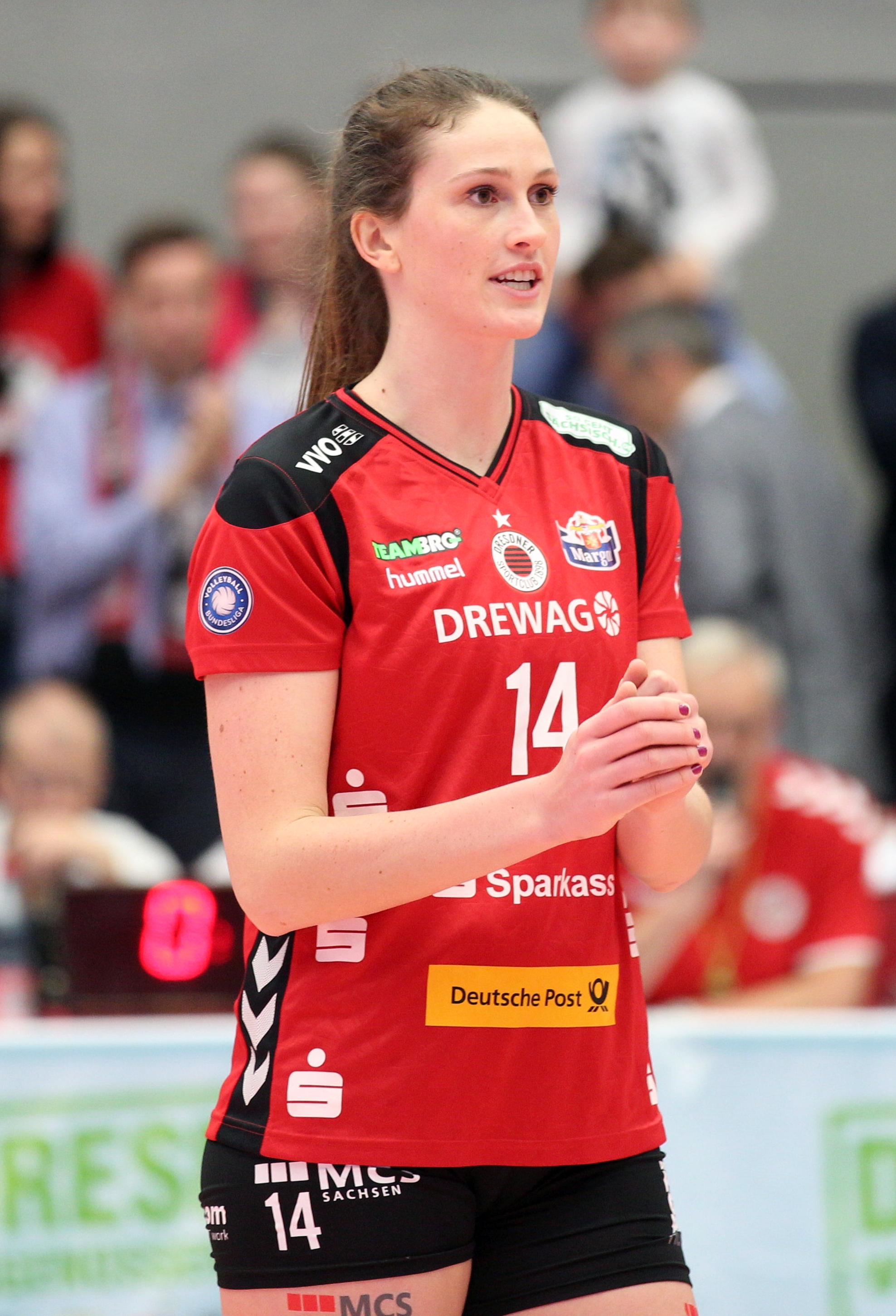
- Born: February 27, 1993 (age 33)
- Education: Lakota West High School (West Chester, Ohio), University of Illinois Urbana-Champaign
- Height: 6 ft 6 in (198 cm)

Elizabeth "Liz" McMahon (born February 27, 1993) is an American volleyball player. She was a silver medalist on the 2010 Junior Olympic volleyball team, the first athlete at the University of Illinois to win the Senior CLASS Award, and a gold medalist at the 2017 Pan American Cup, where she also won the Best Opposite award.

== Early life and education ==
McMahon was born on February 27, 1993, to parents Kevin and Janine McMahon. She has a brother, Colin, and a sister, Clare. She graduated from Lakota West High School in West Chester, Ohio, in 2011. While in high school, she was ranked as the number three recruit in the United States. She attended the University of Illinois Urbana-Champaign, where she was the tallest player in Illini volleyball history. McMahon graduated in 2015 with a degree in sports management. Throughout her college career, she made multiple visits to the local elementary schools as a part of the Hometown Heroes program, which is a program based on giving back to the community.

== Volleyball career ==
=== High school career ===
During McMahon's high school career, she was ranked as the number three recruit in the United States. Hitting over 300 kills each season in high school, McMahon was named a two-time first-team All-Greater Miami Conference performer. She hurt her elbow in her senior year, missing most of the season; She returned in time to complete the final month of the season. She holds the record for the most kills (1,086) at Lakota West High School.

=== College career ===
While just a college freshman, she started in 34 out of 37 matches on the right side, though she got to play in all 37. McMahon had a dominating blocking presence in multiple big games during the 2011 season. She was named to the Big Ten All-Freshman team. McMahon started in 14 out of the 30 matches her sophomore season. In 2012, she led the team in blocks and was second for kills with 400, which would turn out to be her college career high. During her junior season, McMahon reached her 1,000th career kill against Northwestern. At the end of the season, she was ranked 21st amongst all juniors and 124th amongst all active players in career kills. As a senior, McMahon started every match as an outside hitter and ended the season with a total of 396 kills and 110 blocks. Her season also ended with her being ranked 10th in the Big Ten for points per set and 13th in kills per set. She was then awarded the Senior CLASS award because of her great achievements on the volleyball court, in the classroom, and in the community. McMahon was also named to the Academic All-Big Ten team her sophomore through senior years. McMahon made her professional debut on the U.S. Women's National Volleyball Team at the 2017 Pan American Cup and became a gold medalist. She was then replaced, by a coach's decision, with Annie Drews, an outside/right-side hitter from Purdue, for the following season.

=== Professional career ===
After graduation, McMahon played with Valencianas de Juncos, of Juncos, Puerto Rico, for the remainder of the 2014/15 season. She spent the 2015/16 season with Hwaseong IBK Altos, of Hwaseong, South Korea. The team finished the regular season ranked number 1 in the league, though in the post-season they lost in the Finals, ending as runners-up. She then moved to Dresdner SC 1898, of Dresden, Germany, for 2016/17. Last, in 2017/18, she joined Volley Soverato, of Soverato, Italy, for her final season as a player.

While playing with Hwaseong IBK Altos, she received the Korean V-League's awards for Best Opposite player, Best Spiker, and overall league MVP for the 2015–2016 season. She was also the league's #3 scorer on the season, with 727 points, and earned the Player of the Round accolade for both Rounds 4 and 5.

=== Coaching career ===
McMahon has been coaching with Troy Tanner's Tstreet Volleyball Club of Irvine, California, since 2019.

== Awards and achievements ==
=== 2010 ===
- Silver medal at the Junior Olympics

=== 2011 ===
- Big Ten All-Freshman Team
- Big Ten/ BIG EAST Challenge All-Tournament Team

=== 2012 ===
- All-Big Ten
- Big Ten Distinguished Scholar
- Academic All-Big Ten
- Preseason All-Big Ten

=== 2013 ===
- AVCA All-Northeast Region Honorable Mention
- All-Big Ten Honorable Mention
- Big Ten Distinguished Scholar
- Academic All-Big Ten
- Preseason All-Big Ten

=== 2014 ===
- Big Ten Medal of Honor
- Senior CLASS Award Winner
- AVCA All-American Honorable Mention
- Capital One Academic All-District Second Team
- AVCA All-Northeast Region
- All-Big Ten Honorable Mention
- Big Ten Player of the Week (9/1)
- Creighton Classic All-Tournament
- Blue Raider Bash All-Tournament
- Big Ten/Pac-12 Challenge All-Tournament
- Illini Classic All-Tournament MVP
- Big Ten Distinguished Scholar
- Academic All-Big Ten
- Preseason All-Big Ten

=== 2016 ===
- V-League Best Opposite
- V-League Best Spiker
- V-League MVP
- V-League #3 scorer (full season)
- V-League Player of the Round for Round 4
- V-League Player of the Round for Round 5

=== 2017 ===
- Pan American Cup Gold Medalist
- Pan-American Cup Best Opposite
