= Hand model =

Type of modeling profession

A hand model is a person who models (poses or displays) their hand or hands for the purposes of art, fashion, products or advertising. Hand models are used in advertising where advertisers want close ups of the product being handled. Most hands have blemishes such as scrapes, scars, spots, or discolorations which would stand out in a close up and detract from the product. Hand models tend to have flawless skin and hands. In female hand models agents often seek long, slender hands and fingers and long nail beds. They also value smooth, hairless, unblemished skin with minimal wrinkles and visible pores.

Requirements for male hand models vary, depending on whether the job calls for a burly, construction worker type hand or a more white-collar look. For print media hand models, a necessary trait is the ability to pose in a relaxed, graceful fashion. Professional hand models avoid what photographers call "the claw," the rigid grip that novices often use before the camera. Hand models are prevalent in TV commercials, although the hand may not always be visible. Many food commercials have hand models pouring gravy, dipping a French fry or cutting meat. Here perfect hands are not as important as the timing and patience required to "hit one's mark." Some hand models can make upwards of $1,200 a day. For TV work, premiere parts models are paid $1,000 per day and for print work can make $2,000 - $5,000 per day. Many parts models and hand models work part-time as freelancers, but some models like Karina Nelson and Adele Uddo are booked full-time.

Non-professional hand models are also employed when the talent is portraying a character with a skill the actor themself isn't proficient in, such as playing an instrument or creating art, and the production hires a professional in that trade to double for the performer in a close-up shot.

== Hand art ==
Hand art is the application of make-up or paint to a hand to make it appear like an animal or other object. Some hand artists, like Guido Daniele, produce images that are trompe-l'œil representations of wild animals painted on people's hands. Hand artists work closely with hand models. Models can be booked through specialist acting and modeling agencies usually advertising under "body parts models" or "hands and feet models." Many hand models can be hired directly.
