= 2015–16 V-League (South Korea) =

V League
- Season: 2015–16
- Dates: 10 October 2015 – 24 March 2016

The 2015–16 V-League season was the 12th season of the V-League, the highest professional volleyball league in South Korea. The season started on 10 October 2015 and finished on 24 March 2016. Ansan OK Savings Bank Rush & Cash were the defending champions in the men's league and Hwaseong IBK Altos the defending female champions.

== Teams ==
=== Men's clubs ===
Location of teams in V-League Men's Clubs

Team	Location	Stadium	Capacity
Ansan OK Savings Bank Rush & Cash	Ansan	Sangnoksu Gymnasium	2,700
Cheonan Hyundai Capital Skywalkers	Cheonan	Yu Gwan-sun Gymnasium	5,482
Daejeon Samsung Bluefangs	Daejeon	Chungmu Gymnasium	5,000
Gumi KB Insurance Stars	Gumi	Park Jeong-hee Gymnasium	6,277
Incheon Korean Air Jumbos	Incheon	Gyeyang Gymnasium	5,000 Incheon Korean Air Jumbos
Seoul Woori Card Hansae	Seoul	Jangchung Gymnasium	4,618 Jangchung Arena
Suwon KEPCO Vixtorm	Suwon	Suwon Gymnasium	4,317

=== Women's clubs ===
Location of teams in V-League Women's Clubs

Team	Location	Stadium	Capacity
Daejeon KGC	Daejeon	Chungmu Gymnasium	5,000
Gimcheon Korea Expressway Hi-pass	Gimcheon	Gimcheon Gymnasium	6,000
GS Caltex Seoul KIXX	Seoul	Jangchung Gymnasium	4,618 Jangchung Arena
Hwaseong IBK Altos	Hwaseong	Hwaseong Gymnasium	5,152 Hwaseong IBK Altos
Incheon Heungkuk Life Pink Spiders	Incheon	Gyeyang Gymnasium	5,000 Incheon Korean Air Jumbos
Suwon Hyundai Hillstate	Suwon	Suwon Gymnasium	4,317

== Season standing procedure ==
1. Match points
2. Number of matches won
3. Sets ratio
4. Points ratio
5. Result of the last match between the tied teams

Match won 3–0 or 3–1: 3 match points for the winner, 0 match points for the loser
Match won 3–2: 2 match points for the winner, 1 match point for the loser

== Regular season ==
=== League table (Male) ===
Pos	Team	Pld	W	L	Pts	SR	SPR	Qualification
1	Cheonan Hyundai Skywalkers	36	28	8	81	2.244	1.098	Finals
2	Ansan Rush & Cash	36	23	13	71	1.558	1.065	Semifinals
3	Daejeon Samsung Bluefangs	36	23	13	66	1.254	1.044	Semifinals
4	Incheon Korean Air Jumbos	36	21	15	64	1.310	1.018	
5	Suwon KEPCO Vixtorm	36	14	22	47	0.842	0.995	
6	Uijeongbu KB Insurance Stars	36	10	26	28	0.516	0.925	
7	Seoul Woori Card Hansae	36	7	29	21	0.402	0.875	

=== League table (Female) ===
Pos	Team	Pld	W	L	Pts	SR	SPR	Qualification
1	Hwaseong IBK Altos	30	20	10	59	1.683	1.072	Finals
2	Suwon Hyundai Hillstate	30	17	13	53	1.275	1.056	Semifinals
3	Incheon Heungkuk Life Pink Spiders	30	18	12	48	1.069	1.002	Semifinals
4	GS Caltex Seoul KIXX	30	15	15	47	1.033	1.035	
5	Gyeongbuk Gimcheon Hi-pass	30	13	17	41	0.889	0.977	
6	Daejeon KGC	30	7	23	22	0.474	0.874	

== Play-offs ==
=== Bracket (Male) ===
Semifinals
1	Cheonan Hyundai Skywalkers
2	Ansan Rush & Cash	3	3
3	Daejeon Samsung Bluefangs	0	1

Finals
1	Cheonan Hyundai Skywalkers	2	0	3	1
2	Ansan Rush & Cash	3	3	1	3

=== Bracket (Female) ===
Semifinals
1	Hwaseong IBK Altos
2	Suwon Hyundai Hillstate	3	3
3	Incheon Heungkuk Life Pink Spiders	1	1

Finals
1	Hwaseong IBK Altos	0	0	0
2	Suwon Hyundai Hillstate	3	3	3

== Top Scorers ==
=== Men's ===
Rank	Player	Club	Points
1	(Germany) György Grozer	Daejeon Samsung Bluefangs	1073
2	(Cuba) Robertlandy Simon	Ansan OK Savings Bank Rush & Cash	919
3	(Czech Republic) Jan Štokr	Suwon KEPCO Vixtorm	907
4	(Cuba) Oriol Camejo	Cheonan Hyundai Capital Skywalkers	789
5	(Slovakia) Martin Nemec	Gumi KB Insurance Stars	648
6	(South Korea) Song Myung-geun	Ansan OK Savings Bank Rush & Cash	572
7	(South Korea) Kim Yo-han	Gumi KB Insurance Stars	566
8	(South Korea) Moon Sung-min	Cheonan Hyundai Capital Skywalkers	554
9	(South Korea) Kim Hak-min	Incheon Korean Air Jumbos	524
10	(Russia) Pavel Moroz	Incheon Korean Air Jumbos	489

=== Women's ===
Rank	Player	Club	Points
1	(United States) Hayley Spelman	Daejeon KGC	776
2	(United States) Leslie Cikra	Gyeongbuk Gimcheon Hi-pass	737
3	(United States) Elizabeth McMahon	Hwaseong IBK Altos	727
4	(United States) Katherine Bell	GS Caltex Seoul KIXX	607
5	(United States) Emily Hartong	Suwon Hyundai Hillstate	577
6	(United States) Taylor Simpson	Incheon Heungkuk Life Pink Spiders	506
7	(South Korea) Lee Jae-yeong	Incheon Heungkuk Life Pink Spiders	498
8	(South Korea) Yang Hyo-jin	Suwon Hyundai Hillstate	466
9	(South Korea) Hwang Youn-joo	Suwon Hyundai Hillstate	377
10	(South Korea) Park Jeong-ah	Hwaseong IBK Altos	373

== Player of the Round ==
=== Men's ===
Round	Player	Club
1	(Hungary) Robertlandy Simon	Ansan OK Savings Bank Rush & Cash
2	(Germany) György Grozer	Daejeon Samsung Bluefangs
3	(South Korea) Kim Hak-min	Incheon Korean Air Jumbos
4	(South Korea) No Jae-wook	Cheonan Hyundai Capital Skywalkers
5	(Cuba) Oriol Camejo	Cheonan Hyundai Capital Skywalkers
6	(South Korea) Moon Sung-min	Cheonan Hyundai Capital Skywalkers

=== Women's ===
Round	Player	Club
1	(South Korea) Lee Jae-yeong	Incheon Heungkuk Life Pink Spiders
2	(South Korea) Yang Hyo-jin	Suwon Hyundai Hillstate
3	(South Korea) Yang Hyo-jin	Suwon Hyundai Hillstate
4	(United States) Elizabeth McMahon	Hwaseong IBK Altos
5	(United States) Elizabeth McMahon	Hwaseong IBK Altos
6	(South Korea) Park Jeong-ah	Hwaseong IBK Altos

== Final standing ==
=== Men's League ===
Rank	Team
1st place, gold medalist(s)	Ansan Rush & Cash
2nd place, silver medalist(s)	Cheonan Hyundai Capital Skywalkers
3rd place, bronze medalist(s)	Daejeon Samsung Bluefangs
4	Incheon Korean Air Jumbos
5	Suwon KEPCO Vixtorm
6	Uijeongbu KB Insurance Stars
7	Seoul Woori Card Hansae

=== Women's League ===
Rank	Team
1st place, gold medalist(s)	Suwon Hyundai Hillstate
2nd place, silver medalist(s)	Hwaseong IBK Altos
3rd place, bronze medalist(s)	Incheon Heungkuk Life Pink Spiders
4	GS Caltex Seoul KIXX
5	Gyeongbuk Gimcheon Hi-pass
6	Daejeon KGC
