= The Apprentice (Italian TV series) =

- The header of 2012 edition with Flavio Briatore
- Genre: Reality television series
- Created by: Mark Burnett
- Country of origin: Italy
- Original language: Italian
- No. of series: 1
- No. of episodes: 10

Production
- Producer: Screentime ShinAwiL Productions
- Running time: 60-minute episodes

Original release
- Network: Cielo
- Release: 18 September – 16 October 2012

Related
- The Apprentice (U.S. version); The Apprentice (UK version)

The Apprentice is an Italian reality television series, in which a group of aspiring young businessmen and women compete for the chance to win a job as "apprentice" to Flavio Briatore, a business magnate.

== First edition ==
Winner

- Francesco Menegazzo, 29, Trader

Other Contestants

- Alberto Belloni, 37, Businessman
- Beatrice Orlando, 33, College researcher
- Chiara Gallana, 24, Public relations attendant
- Davide Gaiardelli, 34, Businessman
- Donatello Bellomo, 33, Marketing advisor
- Enrico Perone, 25, Advertiser
- Enrico Tarantino, 27, Software developer
- Jessica Cibin, 26, Modeling agency manager
- Marcella Gamba, 39, Insurance agency manager
- Maria Elena Caruso, 29, Cosmetics agency CEO
- Martina Frappi, 25, Businessman and fashion designer
- Matteo Gatti, 38, Commercial consultant
- Norma Bossi, 27, Press office manager
- Silvia Fazzini, 24, Foreign languages student
- Stefano Di Dio, 36, Business advisor

Donatello and Norma haven't passed the last selection, so they are not part of the official cast.

Elimination Chart
No.	Candidate	1	2	3	4	5	6	7	8	9	10
1	Francesco	IN	IN	IN	IN	LOSE	BR	IN	WIN	IN	HIRED
2	Matteo	BR	IN	BR	IN	WIN	IN	WIN	IN	IN	FIRED
3	Silvia	IN	IN	IN	IN	IN	WIN	IN	IN	FIRED	
4	Alberto	IN	IN	IN	LOSE	IN	BR	IN	IN	FIRED	
5	Enrico P.	IN	IN	WIN	IN	IN	IN	IN	FIRED		
6	Enrico T.	IN	WIN	IN	IN	IN	IN	FIRED			
7	Martina	WIN	IN	IN	BR	BR	FIRED				
8	Jessica	IN	LOSE	IN	IN	FIRED					
9	Stefano	LOSE	IN	BR	FIRED						
10	Beatrice	IN	BR	IN	FIRED						
11	Marcella	IN	IN	IN	QUIT						
12	Maria Elena	IN	IN	FIRED							
13	Chiara	IN	FIRED								
14	Davide	FIRED									

The candidate was on the winning team
The candidate was on the losing team
The candidate won as project manager
The candidate lost as project manager
The candidate was brought back to the boardroom
The candidate was fired
The candidate lost as project manager and was fired
The candidate quit the competition
The candidate won as project manager but was fired

== Second edition ==
Winner

- Alice Maffezzoli, 29 anni, Sales manager in the energy sector

Other Contestants

- Anais Rean, 24, International sciences student
- Anna Zhitnikova, 28, Finance accounter in the lux sector
- Eleonora Smith, 24, Business administration student
- Fabio Cascione, 34, Commercial director in the wine sector
- Francesco Del Pesce, 31, Corporate lawyer
- Fulvio Cugno, 30, Web marketing businessman
- Ingrid Altomare, 34, Advertising & digital account director
- Marco Martinelli, 22, Biotechnology student
- Mario Crea, 34, Real estate manager
- Milena Pagani, 34, Sales manager in the amusement parks
- Muhannad Al Salhi, 25, Telecommunications sales manager
- Serena Marzucchi, 34, Public sector lawyer
- Simone Piadena, 42, Nightlife businessman

Elimination Chart
No.	Candidate	1	2	3	4	5	6	7	8	9	10
1	Alice	IN	IN	IN	WIN	IN	IN	BR	BR	IN	HIRED
2	Muhannad	IN	IN	IN	IN	IN	BR	IN	IN	IN	FIRED
3	Fabio	IN	IN	BR	IN	IN	BR	LOSE	BR	FIRED	
4	Serena	IN	IN	WIN	IN	BR	BR	IN	IN	FIRED	
5	Anais	IN	LOSE	IN	IN	IN	IN	WIN	FIRED		
6	Ingrid	IN	IN	IN	BR	LOSE	IN	IN	FIRED		
7	Marco	IN	IN	IN	IN	WIN	IN	FIRED			
8	Mario	BR	WIN	BR	IN	IN	FIRED				
9	Anna	IN	IN	IN	LOSE	FIRED					
10	Eleonora	IN	IN	IN	FIRED						
11	Francesco	IN	BR	FIRED							
12	Milena	WIN	FIRED								
13	Simone	BR	FIRED								
14	Fulvio	FIRED									

The candidate was on the winning team
The candidate was on the losing team
The candidate won as project manager
The candidate lost as project manager
The candidate was brought back to the boardroom
The candidate was fired
The candidate lost as project manager and was fired
The candidate was on the winning team, but was fired
