= Soverato =

- Comune
- Comune di Soverato
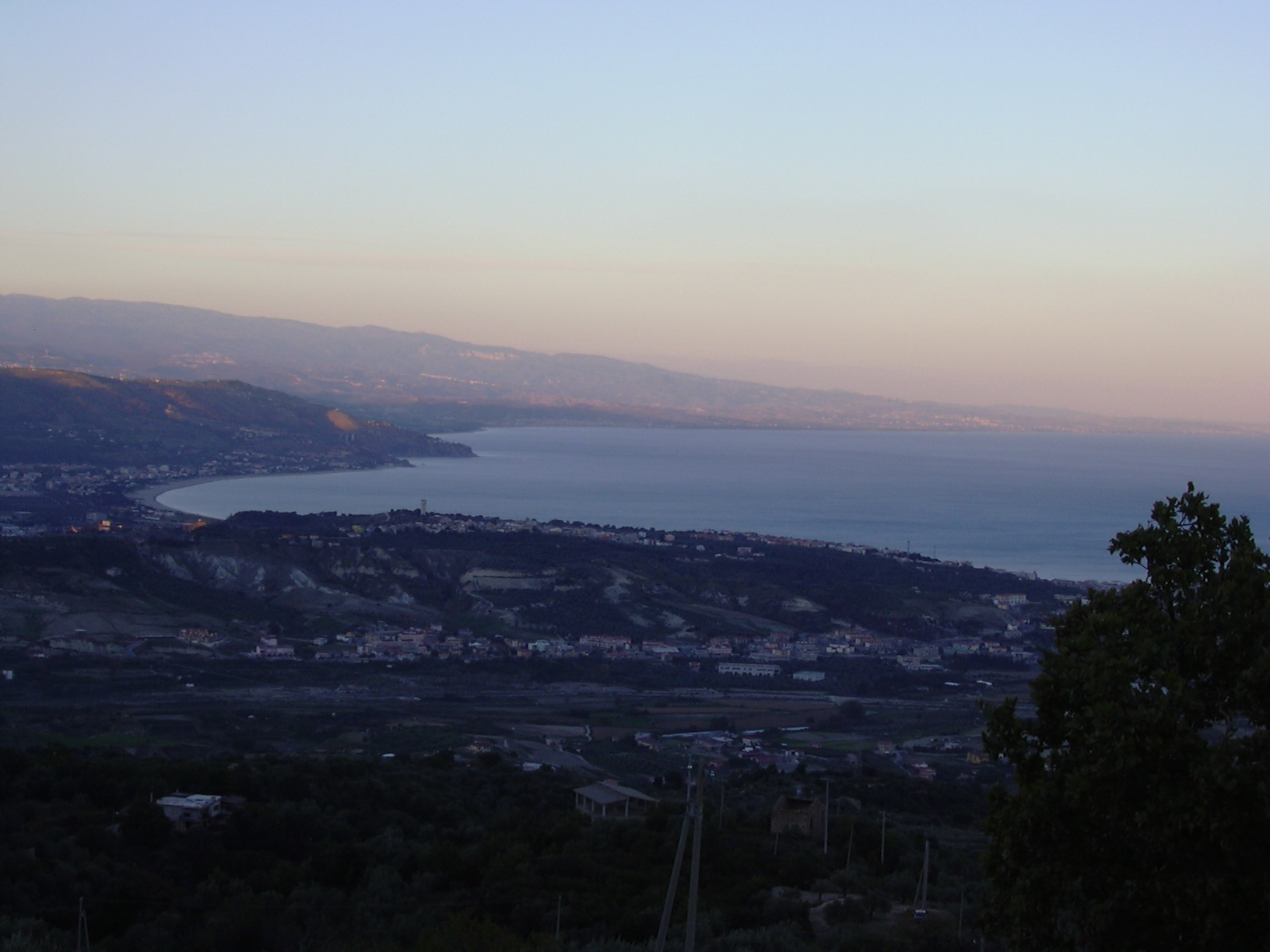

- Coat of arms

- Location within Italy Location within Calabria
- Coordinates: 38°41′N 16°33′E
- Country: Italy
- Region: Calabria
- Province: Catanzaro (CZ)
- Frazioni: Soverato Superiore

Government
  - Mayor: Daniele Vacca

Area
  - Total: 7.7 km^{2} (3.0 sq mi)
- Elevation: 7 m (23 ft)

Population (31 December 2013)
  - Total: 9,143
  - Density: 1,200/km^{2} (3,100/sq mi)
- Demonym: Soveratesi
- Time zone: UTC+1 (CET)
  - Summer (DST): UTC+2 (CEST)
- Postal code: 88068
- Dialing code: 0967
- Patron saint: Madonna addolorata
- Saint day: 15 september
- Website: Official website

Soverato (Calabrian: Suvaràtu) is a town and comune in the province of Catanzaro in the Calabria region of Southern Italy.

Soverato is the wealthiest town per capita in Calabria, and it has recently been experiencing a spike in tourism since 2015, making Soverato a popular travel destination. Recent projects have been underway to accommodate these new tourists including the addition of the Villa Comunale, the renovation of Lungomare Europa and the ongoing reconfiguration of the main shopping road in town, Corso Umberto I, which is scheduled to be complete in late 2019.

== Geography ==
Soverato sits on the Ionian Sea, in the Gulf of Squillace. Nearby there is a string of villages along the white beaches of the gulf like Montepaone, Davoli and Isca Marina.

The Giardino Botanico Santicelli botanic gardens were built on a former waste site in 1980. The town is bordered by Montepaone, Petrizzi and Satriano. Soverato can be reached via the Lamezia Terme International Airport within a 35- to 40-minute drive.

== Notable people ==
- Guido Daniele (hand and body artist)
- Elisabetta Gregoraci (model and TV personality)
- Gigi Peronace (football agent and founder of the Anglo-Italian Cup)

== Photogallery ==
=== Modern buildings ===
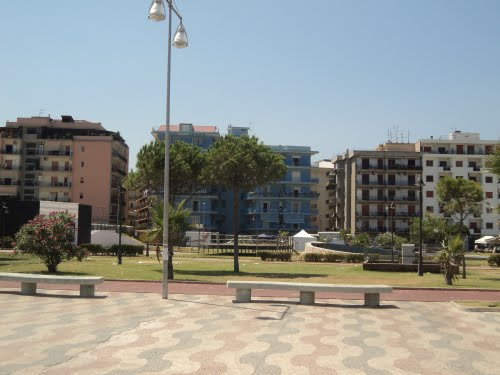

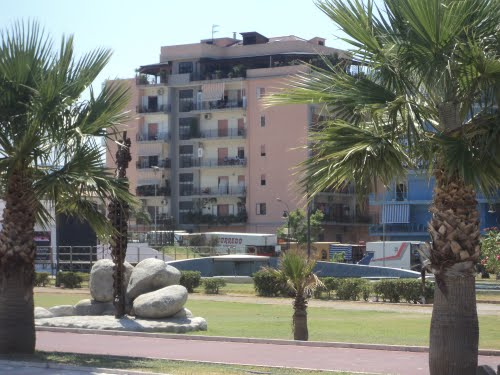

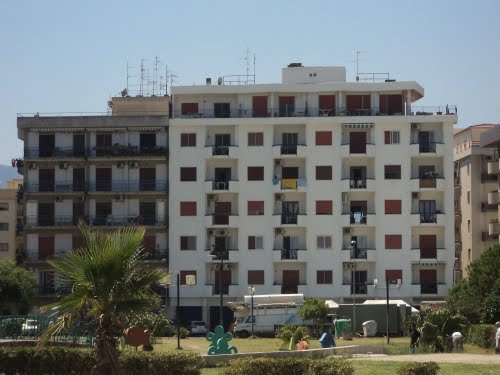
