= Isca Marina =

Locality in the Calabria region of Italy

Coordinates: 38°36′N 16°33′E

A beach in Isca Marina.

Isca Marina is a locality which forms part of the commune of Isca sullo Ionio in the province of Catanzaro in the Calabria region of Italy.

Isca Marina is renowned for its white sandy beaches on Ionian Sea in the Gulf of Squillace.

Isca is thirteen minutes away from the coastal resort of Soverato, where hospital, schooling and other services are provided.
