= Flavio Briatore =

Italian businessman (born 1950)

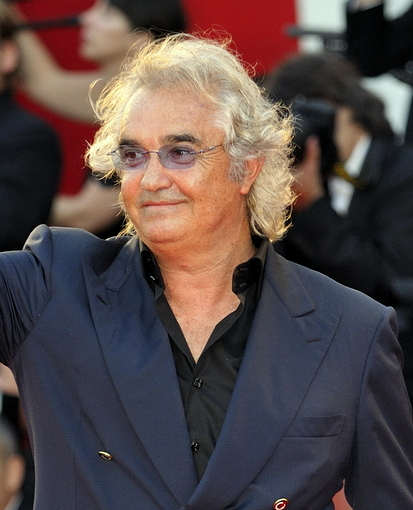
- Briatore in 2009
- Born: 12 April 1950 (age 76); Verzuolo, Piedmont, Italy
- Occupation: Businessman
- Spouse: Elisabetta Gregoraci (m. 2008; sep. 2017)
- Partners: Naomi Campbell (1998–2003); Heidi Klum (2003–2004)
- Children: 2, including Leni Klum

Flavio Briatore (Italian: [ˈflaːvjo bri.aˈtoːre]; born 12 April 1950) is an Italian businessman, who serves as executive adviser and de facto team principal of Alpine in Formula One. As the longtime team principal of the colloquially known "Team Enstone" (Benetton Formula / Renault F1 Team), Briatore led the team to three World Constructors' Championship and four World Drivers' Championship victories. However, he was dogged by allegations of cheating, including the 1994 "Launch Control" controversy and the 2007 "Spygate" affair, although in both cases his teams escaped penalties. He was forced out of Renault and received a lifetime ban from F1 after the 2008 "Crashgate" scandal, although a French court subsequently overturned the ban. Fifteen years later, he returned to the Enstone team, which currently operates as Alpine F1.

Briatore started his career as a restaurant manager and insurance salesman in Italy. He was convicted in Italy on several fraud charges in the 1980s, receiving two prison sentences, though the convictions were later extinguished by an amnesty. He spent several years as a fugitive in the Virgin Islands and the United States, where he set up several United Colors of Benetton franchises, paving the way for his role at Benetton's F1 team. From 2007 to 2011, he was part-owner and chairman of English association football team Queens Park Rangers.

== Early life, convictions, and exile ==
Briatore was born in Verzuolo near Cuneo in the Maritime Alps. His parents were school teachers. After twice failing public (state) school, he attended Fassino di Busca, a private (independent) school, receiving a diploma with the lowest grades in Land Surveying.

=== Early business career ===
Briatore found early work as a ski instructor and restaurant manager. He opened a restaurant named Tribüla, which was his own nickname. (The term Tribüla refers to "a restless character who will do almost anything to get what he wants." Briatore admitted that the name fit him well.) The restaurant was unsuccessful and had to close due to excessive debt.

In the 1970s, Briatore moved to Cuneo and became an assistant to businessman Attilio Dutto, owner of the Paramatti Vernici paint company. Dutto was killed on 21 March 1979 in a car bomb attack by an unknown perpetrator. Briatore then moved to Milan and worked for Finanziaria Generale Italia at the Italian stock exchange.

While working in Milan, Briatore met Luciano Benetton, founder of the Benetton clothing company. When Benetton expanded to the United States in 1979, he appointed Briatore to lead the group's American operations.

=== Convictions and fugitive years ===
In the 1980s, Briatore was convicted of multiple counts of fraud and received two prison sentences. In 1984, a court in Bergamo found him guilty of fraud arising from the collapse of Milan's Compagnia Generale Industriale. It sentenced him to a prison term of one year and six months (reduced to one year on appeal), as well as a fine. In 1986, a court in Milan found Briatore guilty of fraud and conspiracy; he helped a ring of confidence tricksters that recruited gamblers to play rigged card games. He received a three-year sentence (reduced to one year and two months on appeal).

To avoid imprisonment, Briatore fled the country and lived as a fugitive in Saint Thomas, Virgin Islands. He did not return to the EU until his convictions were extinguished by amnesty. In 2010, a Turin court ordered Briatore rehabilitated, which by Italian Criminal Code results in the extinction "of any criminal effect of the conviction".

In 1999, the Corriere della Sera reported that Briatore had been arrested in Nairobi on suspicion of fraud relating to real estate in Kenya. Briatore successfully sued the newspaper for libel and received compensation.

=== Life in exile ===
During his exile, Briatore continued working for Benetton. By 1989, there were 800 Benetton stores in the United States, which was attributed to Benetton and Briatore's franchising methods. Briatore became very wealthy, as he received a cut of every franchising agreement. Briatore also opened some Benetton stores in the Virgin Islands. However, store operators complained that Benetton sold too many franchises, which created excessive competition.

== Formula One ==
=== Benetton Formula ===
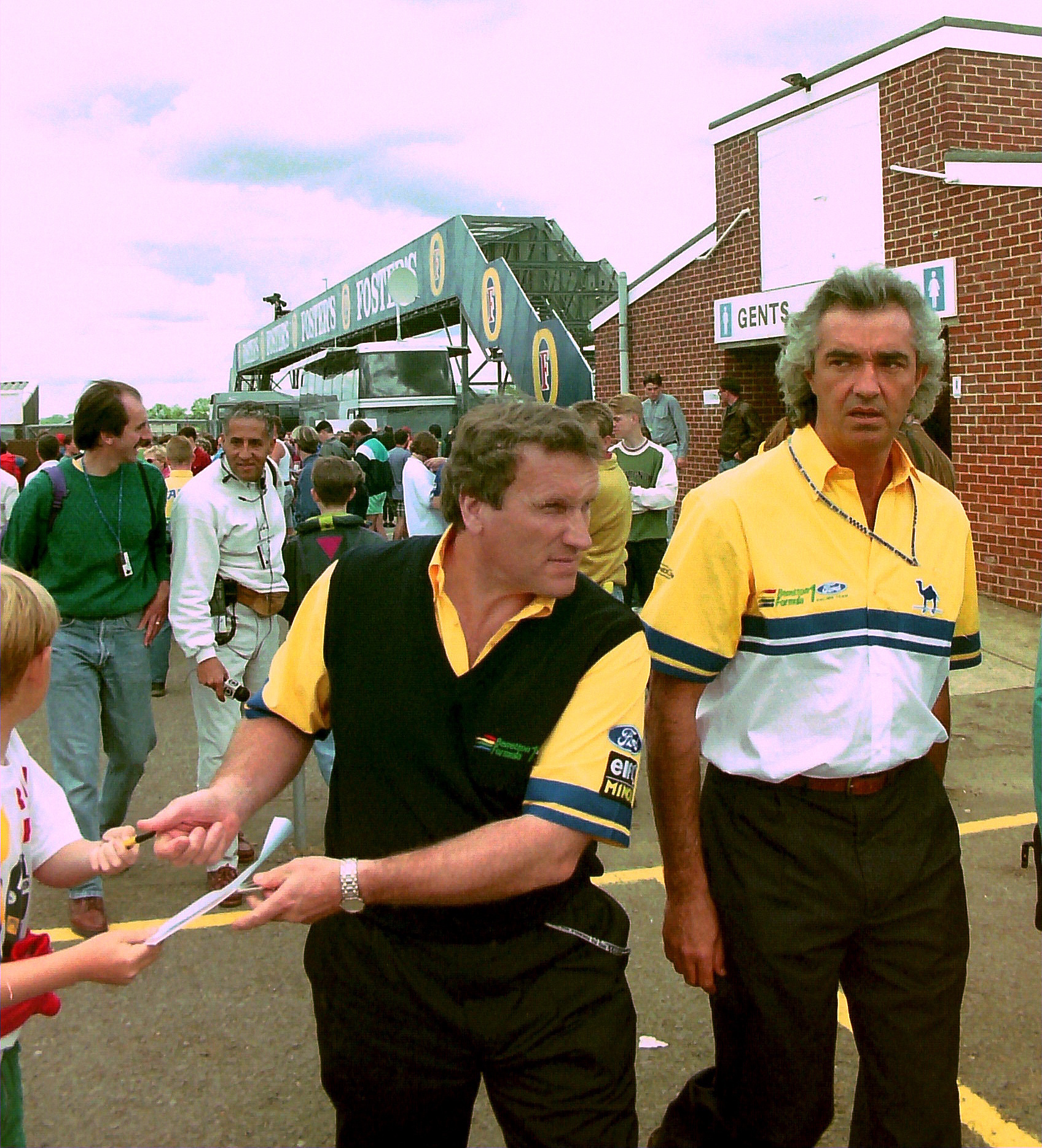
Briatore (right) with Tom Walkinshaw at the 1993 British Grand Prix

In 1985, the Benetton family purchased Formula One team Toleman Motorsport, which it then renamed to Benetton Formula. At first, Briatore (who was not interested in auto racing) was not involved with the team. He did not attend a race until the 1988 Australian Grand Prix, the final race of the season. However, in 1989, the Benetton family reassigned him to manage the team's commercial operations. He assumed full control of the team in 1991, and eventually acquired a 30% personal stake in the team.

Under Briatore's leadership, "the rebel F1 team became a part of the establishment" and won three world championships. The Independent wrote that Briatore's "cut-throat tactics" and commercial savvy "helped [] push F1 towards its current hyper-commercial state." Briatore aggressively brainstormed ideas to improve the level of competition in Formula One, including starting races in reverse grid position after qualifying and sending out a pace car to artificially restrain front-runners who were more than 12 seconds in front.

However, Briatore angered members of the Formula One establishment, in part for his vocal opposition to the upward trend of costs in Formula One. In 1993, he used his leverage to force the then-dominant Williams team to agree to limits on engine changes and qualifying procedures. Williams had blown a deadline to file its entry paperwork for the 1993 season, and Briatore (all team principals had a veto) refused to let Williams compete in 1993 until Frank Williams "listen[ed] to [him]" on costs. The move was deemed "grossly unsporting" at the time, but Briatore's position ultimately won out. Led by Alain Prost, Williams won a double world championship that year.

==== Building a team ====
Briatore's skills lay primarily on the commercial side of the sport, and he reportedly "revelled in his technical ignorance of F1" from day one. Even so, he built a "super team" of talented engineers at Benetton. He started by hiring celebrated chassis designer John Barnard, but existing designers Rory Byrne and Pat Symonds disliked working with Barnard. In 1990, Byrne, Symonds, and 11 other engineers quit en masse to join the abortive Adrian Reynard F1 project. To Symonds' surprise, Briatore stayed on good terms with him and Byrne, and convinced them to return at the end of the 1991 season; Barnard was fired. Briatore also hired Tom Walkinshaw and Ross Brawn. In 1992, the team moved to a new facility at Enstone, Oxfordshire, where it remains to this day.

Briatore also became famous for his "hard-nosed" approach to hiring and firing drivers; Motor Sport noted that over the years, "Johnny Herbert, Martin Brundle, Jos Verstappen, JJ Lehto and Jarno Trulli all felt the full force" of Briatore's wrath.

==== Recruiting Schumacher ====
Briatore lured rookie driver Michael Schumacher from the Jordan team after his first F1 race in 1991. The Times observed that Briatore knew Schumacher could be the best and built a team around him at Benetton.

The circumstances of Schumacher's move were controversial. Reportedly, Schumacher had signed a letter of intent to sign "a contract" with Jordan for 1991 to 1993, but once Briatore grew interested, Benetton and Schumacher's management interpreted the letter as allowing Schumacher to satisfy his obligation to Jordan with non-racing contracts. Briatore won a legal battle with Jordan, allowing him to sign the German. Briatore also ousted Benetton driver Roberto Moreno to make room for Schumacher, arguing that Benetton's deal with Moreno only obliged Briatore to supply him with a chassis, not an engine. Moreno eventually accepted a buyout. According to Briatore, Moreno's teammate Nelson Piquet was so upset by Briatore's treatment of Moreno that he temporarily quit the team, and Ayrton Senna also criticized Briatore's actions. Briatore convinced Piquet to return by threatening to replace him with Alex Zanardi.

Briatore subsequently enraged Schumacher by violating a clause in the German's contract mandating that Benetton had to match the salary paid to any driver besides Senna, Alain Prost, or Nigel Mansell. Briatore gave Riccardo Patrese a $3 million contract for the 1993 season, which exceeded Schumacher's $2 million salary, but did not tell Schumacher about it. Reportedly, Patrese disclosed his salary to McLaren's Ron Dennis, who leaked the information to Schumacher's camp. Using Briatore's duplicity as leverage, Schumacher negotiated a significant raise for the 1994 season.

==== Titles and cheating allegations ====
As the team improved, Schumacher won two races in 1992 and 1993, and claimed the World Drivers' Championship in 1994 and 1995.

During the 1994 season, Benetton was accused of multiple forms of cheating. Although Formula One had banned electronic driver aids ahead of the 1994 season, it was later revealed that Benetton had retained illegal software, although it remains disputed whether Benetton ever used it. Benetton's second driver, Jos Verstappen, claimed that Briatore knew about the software and encouraged him to "not talk about it." However, the Liverpool Data Research Associates, called in by the FIA after the San Marino Grand Prix to investigate allegations of cheating using banned driving aids, concluded that the illegal software likely was not used by Benetton during the Grand Prix, leading the FIA to take no action against the team.

In addition, an investigation into a fire during a Verstappen pit stop revealed that Benetton had discarded a regulation fuel filter to speed up its pit stops, although Briatore escaped punishment after pointing out that multiple teams had done the same thing. Schumacher received a two-race ban for ignoring a black flag (under instructions from the team) at the British Grand Prix, and controversially clinched his first title by colliding with his closest competitor at the Australian Grand Prix.

Following Schumacher's 1994 title season, Ferrari's Umberto Agnelli offered Briatore a job at the Scuderia, but Briatore declined, citing his ownership stake in Benetton. Instead, Briatore upgraded Benetton further by buying the Ligier team—one of the only Formula One teams with a contract for the dominant Renault engines—and transferring its Renault contract to Benetton. (Briatore was not the only person with this idea: McLaren's Ron Dennis and Mansour Ojjeh had previously sought to buy Ligier because their star driver, Ayrton Senna, wanted a better engine.) With Renault power, Benetton won the 1995 Constructors' Championship, and Schumacher defended his Drivers' Championship. Byrne and Symonds claimed that their 1995 victory vindicated them after the accusations of 1994.

==== Ligier ====
The Ligier-Benetton partnership was brief but occasionally successful. Briatore hoped to turn Ligier into Benetton's B-team, reasoning that the two teams could pool costs, share parts, and save money. He stripped Ligier of its Renault engines but transferred several Benetton personnel to the French team, including Tom Walkinshaw and Frank Dernie. When Ligier unveiled its 1995 car, the racing press mocked it as a copy of Benetton's. Benetton aerodynamicist Willem Toet accused his own team of violating Formula One's information sharing rules and later said that it was one of the reasons why he left for Ferrari, but Dernie defended his actions, arguing that Williams and McLaren had also copied Benetton's chassis.

The team collected one win under Briatore, when Olivier Panis won the 1996 Monaco Grand Prix. However, the team began to stagnate; Walkinshaw left the team for Arrows, taking Pedro Diniz (and his hefty Parmalat backing) with him. French president Jacques Chirac pressured Briatore to sell the team to a Frenchman, and Alain Prost (Prost Grand Prix) bought the team ahead of the 1997 season.

==== First departure from Enstone ====
Schumacher left for Scuderia Ferrari before the 1996 season, and lured Rory Byrne and Ross Brawn to Maranello at the end of the year. Briatore retaliated by signing Ferrari's drivers Gerhard Berger and Jean Alesi, but the Benetton team slipped to the middle of the grid. In 1997, Benetton replaced Briatore with David Richards.

Briatore sold his Benetton shares and invested the proceeds in Supertec, which he led from 1998 to 2000. Supertec was formed in the wake of Renault's departure from Formula One to supply the old Renault engines (built by Mecachrome) to F1 teams, including Benetton itself (1999 & 2000 as "Playlife"), Williams and BAR in 1999, and Arrows in 2000. Briatore forced Benetton to pay £17m/year to keep Renault power.

Briatore also purchased a share of the Minardi team in 1996, but after failing to sell it to British American Tobacco as he had hoped, he sold out to fellow owners Giancarlo Minardi and Gabriele Rumi.

=== Renault F1 ===
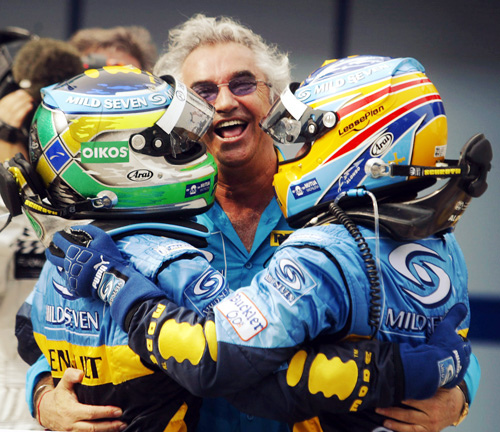
Briatore with Giancarlo Fisichella (left) and Fernando Alonso (right) after their 1–2 finish at the 2006 Malaysian Grand Prix

In 2000, Renault announced its plans to return to Formula One with the purchase of the Benetton Formula team. Briatore returned as managing director and team principal, replacing Rocco Benetton. The team raced as Benetton-Renault in 2001 before becoming Renault F1 in 2002.

At Renault, Briatore continued aggressively cycling through drivers. In 2003, he dropped future world champion Jenson Button to make room for future two-time world champion Fernando Alonso. Against public outcry, Briatore promised that "time will tell if I am wrong." In addition, while he personally managed Jarno Trulli and Nelson Piquet Jr., he also dropped both of them from Renault. He sacked Trulli the same year that Trulli collected his only race win, the 2004 Monaco Grand Prix. Piquet Jr. later called Briatore his "executioner" and "ignorant about Formula 1". Briatore also managed Mark Webber, Heikki Kovalainen, and Romain Grosjean.

Alonso left for rivals McLaren for 2007. Briatore replaced him with Kovalainen, saying "with Kovalainen, I hope to find the anti-Alonso".

In April 2006, Renault F1's new president Alain Dassas stated that having a contract with Briatore for 2007 was 'a key factor' in securing the company's commitment to the sport, "and we will do everything to ensure Flavio stays". Briatore was duly confirmed on 6 September 2006 as staying at Renault for the 2007 and 2008 seasons.

Briatore was also implicated in the 2007 "Spygate" scandal, but escaped without punishment. In November 2007, the FIA alleged that Renault possessed confidential information about the 2006 and 2007 McLaren F1 cars. Following a hearing that December, Renault were found guilty of breaching the same regulation as McLaren, but were not punished. Despite this guilty verdict, Briatore hit back at McLaren's Ron Dennis, saying "here is a team that acquired an advantage illegally. Just read the regulations: for intellectual property theft the punishment is exclusion... Ron Dennis… was the one who protested us on the mass damper. He is not the immaculate saint he pretends to be on his statements".

==== "Crashgate" and resignation ====
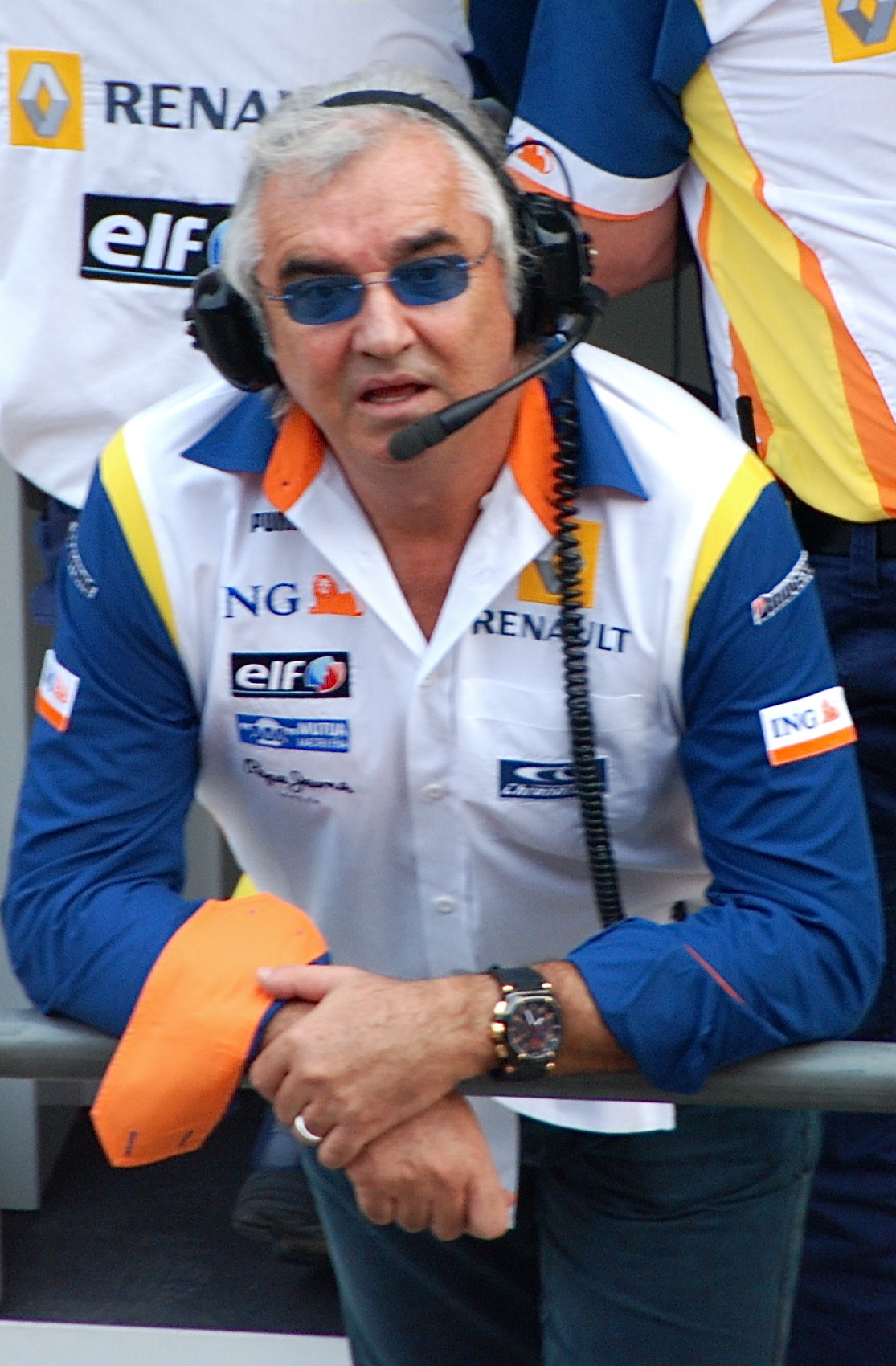
Briatore in 2008

Briatore was forced to resign from Renault after a race fixing scandal. Briatore and chief engineer Pat Symonds asked their number two driver, Nelson Piquet Jr., to intentionally crash during the 2008 Singapore Grand Prix so that his teammate Fernando Alonso could gain an advantage. Alonso eventually won the race. After Briatore dropped Piquet from the team, Piquet traded his confession for immunity. Briatore later said that "I was just trying to save the team." However, he still claims that he never personally spoke with Piquet.

In September 2009, the Fédération Internationale de l'Automobile (FIA) charged Renault with conspiracy and race fixing. Renault and Briatore initially threatened to sue Piquet for defamation, but shortly afterwards, Renault announced that they would not "dispute the recent allegations made by the FIA" and that Briatore and Symonds had left the team. Renault emerged largely unscathed on paper, receiving two years' probation; the FIA explained that Renault promptly and unreservedly accepted guilt and "ensured that [Briatore and Symonds] left the team". However, Renault exited Formula One shortly after, and Piquet never raced in Formula One again.

The FIA was much less lenient on Briatore, handing him what The Daily Mirror described as the harshest sanction ever imposed on an individual in motorsport history. Briatore was indefinitely banned from FIA-sanctioned events. In addition, he was effectively banned from managing drivers, as the FIA announced that it would not permit any driver he managed to renew their superlicence. Symonds received a five-year ban. The FIA explained that it severely punished Briatore because he refused to admit his guilt despite overwhelming evidence, whereas Symonds admitted guilt and expressed remorse.

Briatore sued the FIA in French courts over the unprecedented penalty, demanding his reinstatement and €1 million in compensation. On 5 January 2010, the Tribunal de Grande Instance overturned the bans on Briatore and Symonds and granted them €20,000 in compensation, €15,000 of which went to Briatore. The tribunal said that the FIA lacked authority to ban other F1 figures from working with Briatore and Symonds. It also questioned the quality of the FIA's evidence and suggested that the FIA had not given Briatore due process, as the ban was imposed by a council led by FIA president Max Mosley, whose animosity towards Briatore "was well known." The FIA announced that it would appeal the decision, but the two parties reached an out-of-court settlement the following April.

=== Wilderness years ===
Although the French court ruling made Briatore eligible to return to Formula One in theory, he said that he did not expect to work in F1 again. He spent fifteen years on the sidelines of the sport. However, he remained associated with the sport, particularly through his close relationship with Fernando Alonso.

During his time away from Formula One, Briatore maintained his longstanding belief that Formula One should focus on spectator entertainment over technical innovation. He frequently criticised the direction of modern Formula One, and particularly its emphasis on "hidden technology," saying that "nothing costs more, and delivers less entertainment". He attacked the larger auto manufacturers' push for fuel-efficient engines, saying that the new engines' slower speeds were not fun to watch and that fans wanted to hear the loud noises of the old Formula One engines. He also criticised the new Formula One spending cap, saying that independent teams could not reasonably reach the $175 million ceiling.

=== Return to Formula One ===
In May 2024, Briatore returned to Enstone and Renault (now competing as the Alpine F1 Team). He was given the title of Executive Advisor for the Formula One Division. Although he was employed by the parent Renault company and not the official Alpine team, Motor Sport reported that Briatore had "effectively been given full scope for hirings and firings within the team." Car magazine interpreted his role as "team boss in all but name." On 6 May 2025, following the mid-season resignation of team principal Oliver Oakes, Briatore became Alpine's de facto team principal. He is not the official team principal, as he is not an Alpine employee and he does not hold the requisite FIA license.

Briatore's return to F1 was controversial, largely due to lingering memories from Crashgate. However, several F1 executives, including Mercedes' Toto Wolff, Ferrari's Frédéric Vasseur, and Sauber's Alessandro Alunni Bravi, commented positively on the move. Briatore credited Formula One chief Stefano Domenicali for facilitating his comeback.

Upon returning to Renault/Alpine, Briatore aggressively cut expenses, reducing headcount at Alpine's Enstone facility by 25% and shuttering Renault's Viry-Châtillon engine operation in favor of a customer engine supply from Mercedes. Briatore initially claimed that ending Renault's engine program was company leadership's idea, but later claimed it was his idea.

Several media outlets suggested that Renault CEO Luca de Meo had given Briatore a mandate to make the team more attractive to a potential buyer, but Briatore denied the accusation. In 2026, Alpine's minority owners, the Otro Capital syndicate led by Alec Scheiner, discussed selling their 24-percent stake. Briatore said talks were ongoing, but noted that Renault would stay in control even if Otro sold its shares. The season before Briatore arrived, Otro had bought its shares for €200 million, valuing the team at $900 million. By March 2026, Otro claimed to value the team at £1.5-1.86 billion ($1.99-2.46 billion).

== Outside Formula One ==
=== Hospitality and luxury brands ===
Briatore has developed a diverse portfolio of business interests outside Formula 1, many of which revolve around fashion.

He created the Billionaire nightclub brand in 1998 and owned a club in Sardinia; in August 2012, he opened another Billionaire club in Marbella under that name along with an haute couture line, Billionaire Italian Couture. In addition to that, he opened Cipriani's restaurant in Mayfair, London, in 2004 and until 2007 owned 48.9% of the pharmaceuticals company Pierrel. He also operates a Tuscan beach club and Lion in the Sun, a holiday resort in Kenya. Briatore sold the Sardinia nightclub to Leonardo del Vecchio but still owns the Billionaire brand.

Briatore is a beneficiary of Autumn Sailing Ltd, which formerly owned the luxury yacht Force Blue, purchased from Roy Speer for a price variously reported at £68.2m or $87m. Briatore claimed that it was the most extravagant present he had ever bought himself, but rented out the yacht via charter. However, in 2010, the Italian government seized the yacht over a tax dispute. In 2021, the government sold the yacht to Briatore's friend Bernie Ecclestone for €7 million, which Briatore claimed was less than half its true value.

=== Queens Park Rangers ===
Briatore served as chairman of English football club Queens Park Rangers (QPR) from 2007 to 2010. On 1 September 2007, the team announced that Briatore and Bernie Ecclestone had made a recommended offer to buy the club from a Monaco-based consortium led by Gianni Paladini. Lakshmi Mittal joined the ownership group soon after. The total price was £14m.

Under Briatore's leadership, QPR spent heavily and lost large amounts of money, including £19m in 2009 and £14m in 2010. He later said that "I will never invest in a football club again. ... It's only ever a good idea if you're very rich and looking for ways to waste your money. In two years you'll be very poor and won't have that problem anymore." He attempted to directly influence football decisions: he ordered Paolo Sousa to play a second striker at half-time in a match against Crystal Palace, briefly sought to dictate lineups to Marc Bircham, and insisted that Paul Hart play a 4-4-2 formation instead of a 4-3-3.

Briatore resigned from QPR following his ban from the FIA. The Football League's rules stipulate that a club owner must be a "fit and proper person" and allow the League to ban owners who have been banned from another sporting organisation. In September 2009, The Guardian reported that legal experts were not certain whether Briatore qualified for a ban from the Football League. However, the following month, the League announced that it was investigating Briatore's exit from Renault; it also asked the FIA to share the details of its investigation. Briatore floated the idea of resigning in January 2010 and officially resigned that February. In December, he sold his QPR shares to Ecclestone. The season after Briatore's departure, the team won the Championship and was promoted to the Premier League.

=== Television ===
Briatore became the host of the Italian version of The Apprentice in both of its two seasons, in 2012 and 2014, he was originally set to reappear in 2024 after Rai 2 had bought the rights to the show, but due to various dilemmas with the broadcaster and Rai's continuous loss of programs, the move was cancelled indefinitely. He also appeared in Emigratis season 2 episode 4, was a guest on 60 Minutes's segment named "Monaco" and was a guest on Spanish Talk Show El Hormiguero.

== Personal life ==
=== Marriages, relationships, and children ===
Briatore has been married three times and has two children, Leni Klum (b. 2004) and Falco Nathan Briatore (b. 2010). He married the following women:

- Nina Stevens
- Marcy Schlobohm
- Elisabetta Gregoraci (m. 14 June 2008; sep. 2017).

In addition, Briatore was previously engaged to supermodel Naomi Campbell (sep. 2003) and briefly dated supermodel Heidi Klum, a relationship that produced a daughter, Leni.

During Leni Klum's childhood, Heidi Klum and her then-husband Seal both stated that Briatore was not involved in Leni Klum's life; Seal implied it was by mutual agreement, explaining that "[it's] not because [Briatore's] a bad person ... He obviously sees the set-up and leaves it alone." In 2009, Seal announced that Briatore gave consent for Seal to adopt the five-year-old Leni and for her surname to be changed to Klum. He thanked Briatore for agreeing to the change and said that Briatore "was a gentleman about the whole thing".

In September 2023, it was reported that Briatore and Leni were now in contact with each other. In October 2024, Briatore and Klum opened a pizzeria together in Manhattan.

=== Homes and activities ===
In 1993, an explosive device destroyed the front door of Briatore's London mansion. The Provisional Irish Republican Army claimed responsibility.

Briatore currently resides in Monaco, citing its favorable tax rules and good business environment; he has lived there since approximately 2010. After the Italian government auctioned off the Force Blue yacht following a tax dispute, Briatore said that "Italy has never helped me ... and it doesn't deserve to have me living there."

In 2019, Briatore founded the political party Movimento del Fare.

=== Epstein links ===
Briatore and Jeffrey Epstein knew each other, and Briatore was mentioned in the Epstein files. In 2005, Briatore requested to meet with Epstein during a trip to New York City. In 2010, Epstein told Peter Mandelson that Briatore wanted to sell his Chelsea triplex residence, after which Briatore requested to meet with Epstein again. Epstein also described Briatore as "my Italian friend" when discussing Mohamed Al-Fayed.

== See also ==
- The Apprentice (Italian TV series)
