= Giardino Botanico Santicelli =

Botanical garden in Italy

Coordinates: 38°41′N 16°33′E

The Giardino Botanico Santicelli is a botanical garden located in Soverato, Province of Catanzaro, Calabria, Italy. It is open most days of the week in the warmer months.

The garden was established in 1980 on a former waste site, facing southeast over the Golfo di Squillace from an altitude of about 50 meters. It contains more than 1000 species of Mediterranean and exotic plants, as well as four World War II anti-aircraft installations linked by tunnels.

== See also ==
- List of botanical gardens in Italy
