= Adele Uddo =

American model

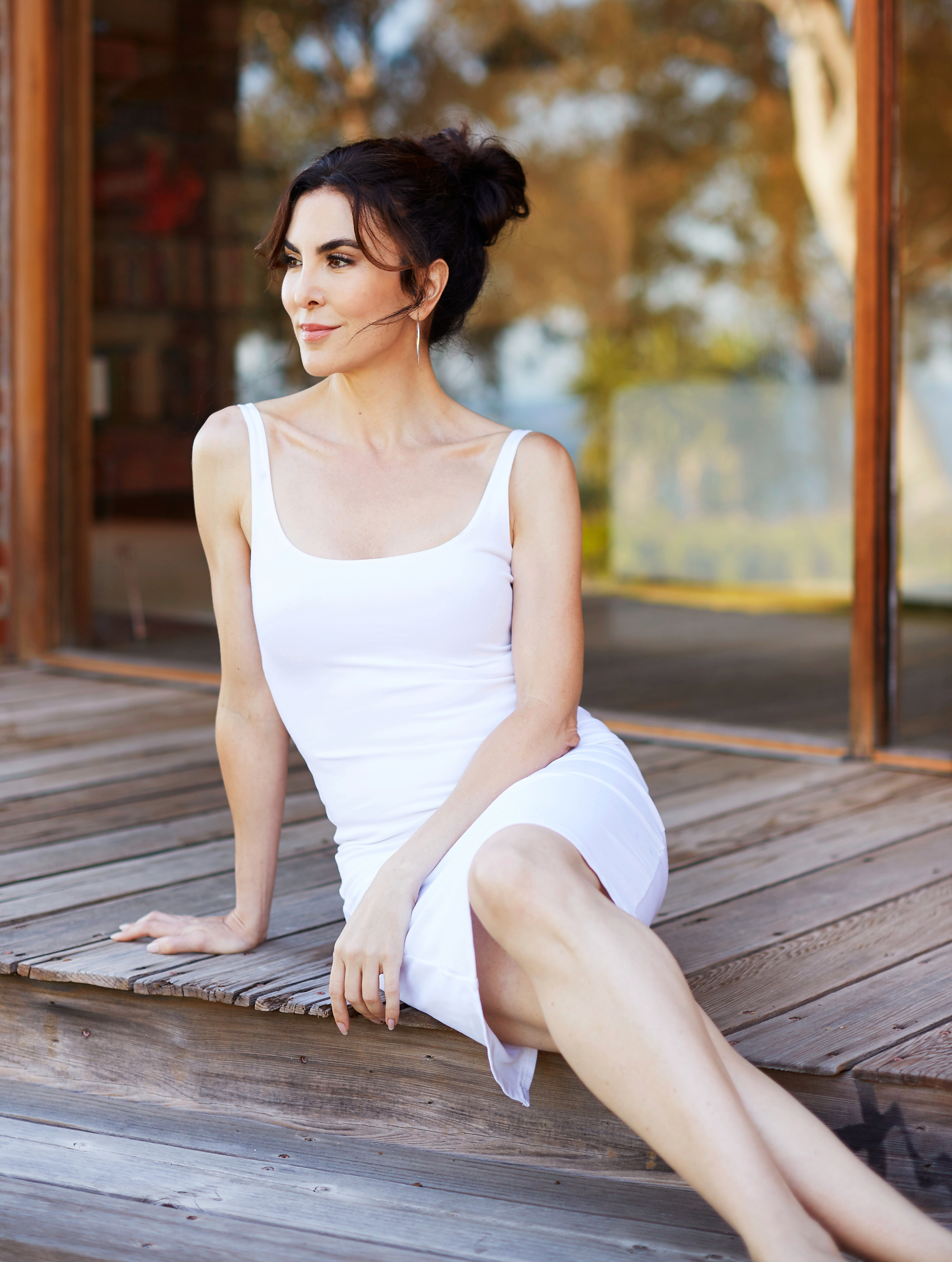
- Born: October 5, 1982 (age 43); New Orleans, Louisiana, United States
- Occupation: Model

Adele Uddo is an American parts model who promotes brands and doubles for celebrities.

== Early life and education ==
Uddo grew up in a California commune. She dropped out of college to pursue a modeling career.

== Career ==
As a parts model, Uddo is most known for modelling her hands, but she also models her lips, legs, feet, eyes, neck and chest to promote brands and as a double for celebrities. She has also appeared in Vogue magazine and on billboards.

Uddo has worked on campaigns for Christian Louboutin, Dior, Revlon, Balmain, Chanel, Essie and Taco Bell.

She is a regular hand stand-in for celebrities, including Katy Perry, Penélope Cruz, Reese Witherspoon, Natalie Portman and Beyoncé, and brands she has been featured in include Allure, Harpers Bazaar, Byrdie and The New York Times.

== Personal life ==
She works in both Los Angeles and New York City, calling herself "bicoastal."
