= Gigi Peronace =

Italian football agent

Luigi Peronace
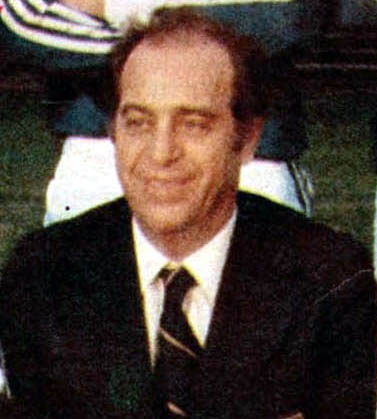
- Peronace in 1979
- Born: 29 November 1925; Soverato, Calabria, Italy
- Died: 29 December 1980 (aged 55); Montevideo, Uruguay
- Occupation: Football agent

Luigi "Gigi" Peronace (Italian pronunciation: [ˈdʒiːdʒi peroˈnaːtʃe]; 29 November 1925 – 29 December 1980) was an Italian football agent from Calabria doing business predominantly between English and Italian clubs. He has been described as the "first real agent in England".

== Life and career ==
Luigi Peronace was born in Soverato, Calabria, Italy, on 29 November 1925. His initial involvement in football came as a goalkeeper. Peronace spoke English, and when the British troops came to Calabria during the Second World War he organised football games with them. After the war, he went to Turin to study engineering at Polytechnic University of Turin, but there he also became interpreter to Juventus's Scottish manager, William Chalmers, and then to his managerial successor, Jesse Carver. When Carver was sacked, Peronace was no longer needed and let go. He was later reunited with Carver when he took the post of business manager at Turin. In 1954, he was unexpectedly put in charge of transfers at Lazio, the team he supported.

In 1957, Leyton Orient manager Alec Stock was interested in moving to Italy. He was put in contact with Peronace, and they discussed the possibility of a move in a rendezvous in Green Park. Peronace convinced AS Roma that Stock was the manager they wanted and the move was completed. That year Peronace also negotiated the transfer of John Charles from Leeds United to Juventus for £65,000 and a £10,000 signing-on fee. In 1961, he negotiated the transfer of Jimmy Greaves from Chelsea to A.C. Milan, and the transfers of two Scottish players to Torino – Joe Baker from Hibernian and Denis Law from Manchester City. He also aided friend Matt Busby in transferring Law back to England in 1962, this time to Manchester United.

In the 1960s, Peronace moved to England and lived a life of some style in a house in Twickenham, in which he erected a huge marble staircase. For a number of years, he continued to be involved in facilitating the transfer of a number of footballers from Britain to Italy, not always successfully, until Serie A stopped permitting the arrival of foreign players in 1966. Seeking another outlet for his talents, he eventually hit upon the idea of staging a cup competition between English and Italian teams, in the manner of those matches he had organised between British troops and Italian civilians in Soverato during the war. This became the Anglo-Italian Cup, which lasted in its original form for four seasons from 1970 to 1973, with Swindon Town – the victors of the 1968-69 Football League Cup and one of the instigators of the event – winning the inaugural competition in 1970. By the later 1970s it had become a semi-professional tournament, and following Peronace's death in 1980 it was renamed the Gigi Peronace Memorial.

Under Enzo Bearzot, Peronace became general manager of the Italian national football team at the 1978 FIFA World Cup. He did the same job at the 1980 UEFA European Football Championship, and later that year, once Serie A had opened up to overseas players again, he was influential in the transfer of Liam Brady from Arsenal to Juventus. It was while Peronace was in Montevideo, preparing with the Italian team for the 1980 Mundialito, that he suffered a massive heart attack and died in Bearzot's arms in the team hotel on 29 December 1980.

== Legacy ==
Peronace left behind a wife and five children, who found themselves in debt due to Gigi's taste for high living and were subsequently rehoused in Latina by Alvaro Marchini, the millionaire former president of Roma. His home in Twickenham had already been sold, and as a token of gratitude his housekeeper, a local Italian resident named Maria Vail, was gifted a bespoke sofa and a large stone Victorian jardiniere, both of which remain in her home to this day. Norman Fox, commenting on Peronace's death in The Times, described him as an "unusually efficient public relations man on behalf of the Italian teams' management... [who] was invaluable and probably irreplaceable." But he was also the first Italian football agent and football manager to achieve great success in Britain, before any other Italian, such as Fabio Capello, Carlo Ancelotti or Antonio Conte.
