= Elisabetta Gregoraci =

Italian fashion model and TV personality (born 1980)

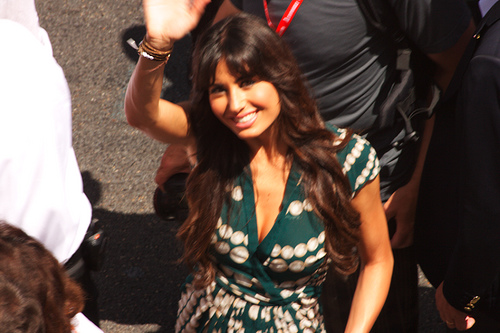
- Born: 8 February 1980 (age 46); Soverato, Province of Catanzaro, Calabria, Italy
- Spouse: Flavio Briatore (m. 2008; sep. 2017)
- Children: 1
- Modeling information
- Height: 1.76 m (5 ft 9 in)
- Hair color: Dark brown
- Eye color: Brown

Elisabetta Gregoraci (born 8 February 1980) is an Italian fashion model and TV personality.

She was born in Soverato, province of Catanzaro, Calabria, in southern Italy. Gregoraci started her career on the Italian television show Libero as a dancer, before replacing model Eva Herzigová for the Wonderbra campaign.

== Personal life ==
On 14 June 2008, Gregoraci married Flavio Briatore, then Formula One manager, in the Santo Spirito in Sassia, Rome. The driver of the bridal car was Fernando Alonso, who after the ceremony drove the newlyweds to the reception at the castle of Torcrescenza.

Gregoraci gave birth to a son in 2010. Briatore already had a daughter, Leni Klum, with German model Heidi Klum, although he is not involved in her life.
