= Guido Daniele =

Italian artist

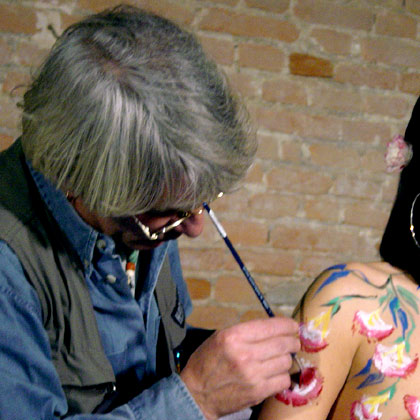
- Born: 1950 (age 75–76); Soverato, Calabria, Italy
- Occupation: Artist
- Known for: Hyper-realistic art

Guido Daniele (born 1950) is a hyperrealist artist who lives and works in Milan, Italy.

== Early years and education ==
Daniele was born in Soverato, Calabria in Italy. In 1972, he graduated from Brera School of Arts, majoring in sculpture. Then, he attended the Tankas school in Dharamsala, India until 1974.

== Career ==
Daniele has worked as a hyper-realistic illustrator, co-operating with editing and advertising companies, innovating with airbrush and testing out various painting techniques. He has painted backcloths up to 400 square meters in size. He has also painted trompe-l'œil images for private houses and public buildings. In 1990, he developed a body painting technique, and his work has been used in advertising images and commercials, as well as fashion events and exhibitions. Among Daniele's most popular works are his 'Handimals' art pieces, where model's hands are painted to look like animals.

== Awards ==
Daniele was awarded the 2007 Hero of the Year by Animal Planet television network.
