= Anglo-Italian Cup =

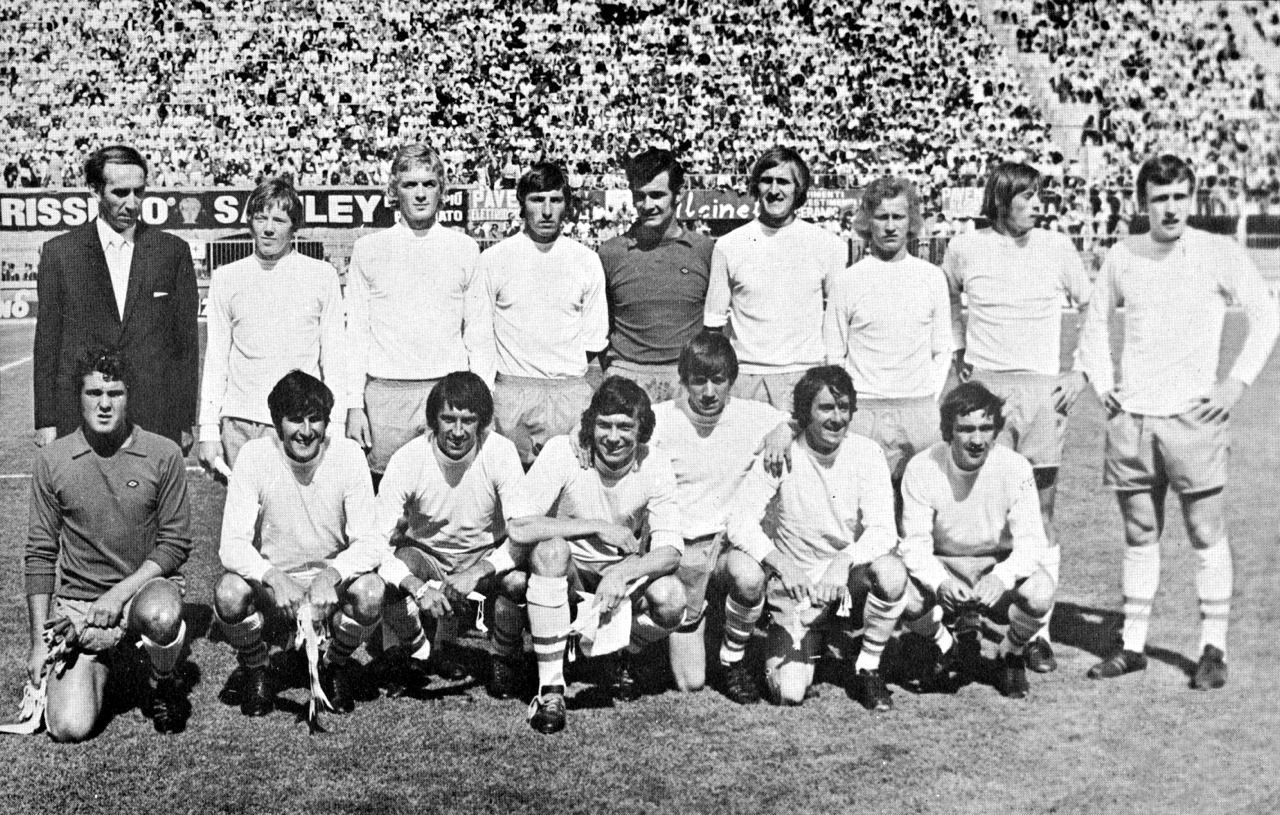
- Founded: 1970; 56 years ago
- Abolished: 1996; 30 years ago
- Region: England; Italy
- Teams: Varied
- Last champions: Genoa
- Most championships: Modena (2 titles)

The Anglo-Italian Cup (Italian: Coppa Anglo-Italiana, also known as the Anglo-Italian Inter-League Clubs Competition and from 1976 to 1986 as the Alitalia Challenge Cup, Talbot Challenge Cup or Gigi Peronace Memorial) was a European football competition.

The competition was played intermittently between 1970 and 1996 between clubs from England and Italy. It was founded by Gigi Peronace, following the two-team Anglo-Italian League Cup in 1969. The initial Anglo-Italian Cup was played as an annual tournament from 1970 to 1973. The first final was abandoned early due to violence, with Swindon Town declared the winners. During its time the tournament had a reputation for violence between fans, and also between players on the pitch. It returned as a semi-professional tournament from 1976 before it was abolished again in 1986.

In 1992, the Anglo-Italian Cup was re-established as a professional cup for second-tier clubs – it replaced the English Full Members Cup. The Italian representatives were Serie B teams. This version of the Cup ran for four seasons, until 1996, before being discontinued due to fixture congestion. The trophy was a 22-inch (56 cm) high gold loving cup mounted on a wooden plinth.

== History ==
=== Professional era ===
Year	Winners	Runners-up
1970	(England) Swindon Town	(Italy) Napoli
1971	(England) Blackpool	(Italy) Bologna
1972	(Italy) Roma	(England) Blackpool
1973	(England) Newcastle United	(Italy) Fiorentina

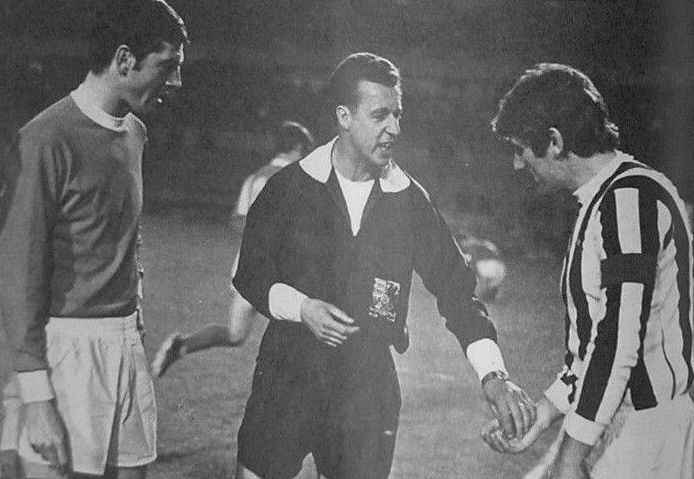
A match in the 1970 Anglo Italian Cup; Juventus vs Swindon Town

From 1967, a place in the Inter-Cities Fairs Cup was awarded to the Football League Cup winners, but that season's winners, Queens Park Rangers, could not take up their place because UEFA did not at that time allow third-tier teams to compete in the Fairs Cup. When the same situation arose two years later with Swindon Town, a two-legged match against that year's Coppa Italia winners, AS Roma, was organised by way of compensation. Following the popularity of that event, dubbed the Anglo-Italian League Cup, and as a way to generate income to pay players' wages during the extended close season caused by the 1970 FIFA World Cup, the first Anglo-Italian Cup was inaugurated in 1970.

For the first competition there were six English teams and six Italian teams. These teams were split into three groups consisting of two English and two Italian teams each, with two points being awarded for a win, one point for a draw, and a point for each goal scored. The final was contested between the best team from each country, and Swindon played Napoli at the Stadio San Paolo on 28 May 1970. Swindon were 3–0 up after 63 minutes, when violence started to break out. The match was halted and then abandoned after 79 minutes, with Swindon being declared as the first winners of the tournament.

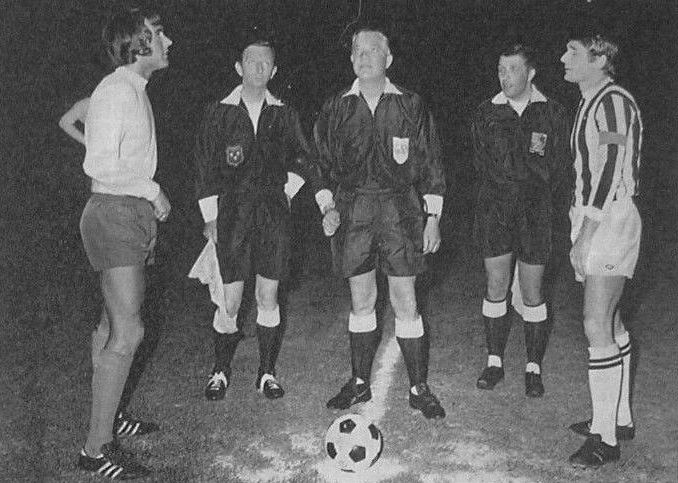
Juventus vs Sheffield Wednesday in the group stage of The Anglo-Italian League Cup, a coin toss.

In 1971, the second edition of the tournament, Blackpool and Bologna were the two nations' best-ranked teams and contested the final at the Stadio Renato Dall'Ara on 12 June 1971. Prior to the match, tournament organiser Gigi Peronace stressed that it was imperative for an Italian club to win back the trophy. After 90 minutes the score was 1–1 and the match went into extra-time, during which Micky Burns scored the winning goal for Blackpool.

Blackpool qualified for the final again in 1972, but were unsuccessful in their defence of the title, with Roma winning 3–1. In 1973, points were no longer awarded for each goal scored, and Newcastle United went on to win the final 2–1 against Fiorentina at the Stadio Artemio Franchi on 3 June 1973. Due to lack of interest the tournament did not continue, and it was not until 1976 that it re-emerged as a semi-professional competition.

=== Anglo-Italian Semiprofessional Cup ===
Year	Winners	Runners-up
1975	(England) Wycombe Wanderers	(Italy) Monza
1976	(Italy) Lecce	(England) Scarborough

=== Semi-professional era ===
Year	Winners	Runners-up
Anglo-Italian Cup
1976	(Italy) Monza	(England) Wimbledon
1977	(Italy) Lecco	(England) Bath City
Alitalia Challenge Cup
1978	(Italy) Udinese	(England) Bath City
1979	(England) Sutton United	(Italy) Chieti
1980	(Italy) Triestina	(England) Sutton United
Talbot Challenge Cup
1981	(Italy) Modena	(England) Poole Town
Gigi Peronace Memorial
1982	(Italy) Modena	(England) Sutton United
1983	(Italy) Cosenza	(Italy) Padova
1984	(Italy) Francavilla	(Italy) Teramo
1985	(Italy) Pontedera	(Italy) Livorno
1986	(Italy) Piacenza Calcio	(Italy) Pontedera

In March 1976, the Anglo-Italian Cup was re-introduced as a semi-professional tournament, with six entrants from each country. Wimbledon and Monza reached the final, with Monza winning the final 1–0, making them unbeaten for the tournament. For the next two years Bath City were the English finalists but they lost to Lecco in 1977, and Udinese in 1978, when the tournament was renamed the Alitalia Challenge Cup.

In 1979, each country had four entrants and Sutton United defeated Italian finalists Chieti 2–1 to become the first and only English winners of the competition during its time as a semi-professional competition. Attempting to defend their title the following year, Sutton United reached the final but were defeated by Triestina.

In 1981, the tournament was called the Talbot Challenge Cup and Modena were the winners. The following year the tournament was renamed the Gigi Peronace Memorial, after the man who organised the tournament, and reduced to four teams. The new format consisted of two Anglo-Italian semi-finals, which meant the final was not necessarily contested by an English and an Italian team. That year, Modena successfully defended their title in a final against Sutton United, who were the last English team to reach the final of the semi-professional tournament.

From 1983 to 1986, the finals were all-Italian contests, and after the 1986 instalment the tournament was discontinued.

=== Professional tournament again ===
Year	Winners	Runners-up
1992–93	(Italy) Cremonese	(England) Derby County
1993–94	(Italy) Brescia	(England) Notts County
1994–95	(England) Notts County	(Italy) Ascoli
1995–96	(Italy) Genoa	(England) Port Vale

The competition was re-established in 1992–93 as a replacement for the Full Members Cup. It was a professional tournament for teams competing in the second tier of football—the newly renamed First Division in England and Serie B in Italy.

The new version of the tournament began with preliminary rounds – 24 English teams competed in 8 groups of three teams. Each team played the others once, and the eight group winners progressed to the main competition.

The main competition consisted of two groups, each with four English, and four Italian teams. Each team would play four group games – against every team in its group from the other nation. Then, the top team in each group from each nation competed in semi-finals: an all-English semi-final, and an all-Italian semi-final. The final was a single match played at Wembley.

In the 1992–93 tournament, Derby County lost the final 3–1 to Cremonese. Brescia won the final in 1994 against Notts County, but Notts County reached the final again in 1995 and defeated Ascoli 2–1. The last instalment of the competition was held in 1995–96, and Genoa triumphed 5–2 over Port Vale in the final on 17 March 1996. The competition was abandoned in 1996 because the two leagues could not agree on dates for fixtures,

== Participants ==
For the original professional tournament in the 1970s, the English entrants were either First Division or Second Division sides. (The First Division sides had generally finished the previous season in the lower half of the table, while the Second Division sides were generally mid-table or better.) With the exception of Bari and Como in 1973, all Italian teams playing in the 1970s tournament had just competed in the previous Serie A season. The Italian clubs were often mid-table or higher finishers who had sometimes also qualified for the European competitions.

When the competition was revived in the 1990s, for the first two seasons all English sides playing in the First Division (2nd level) participated, but in the last two tournaments only 8 English teams played. In 1994/95, two of the clubs relegated from the Premiership were joined by six teams that had just missed out on promotion. For 1995/96, only one relegated Premiership team competed – most of the remaining teams had finished in mid-table or lower table in the previous First Division campaign, and Birmingham City had just been promoted from Division Two.

The Italian participants in the revived 1990s tournament were the four teams that had just been relegated from Serie A and the four teams that had finished highest but not been promoted in Serie B. The exception to this was Verona, who were relegated in 1991/92, but did not play in the 1992/93 cup.

=== Table of participants and performance by season ===
Country	Club	1970	1971	1972	1973	1992–93	1993–94 (Note: The references for the qualifiers are 1 2 3 45 6 7 8)	1994–95	1995–96
(England)	Middlesbrough	GS					GS	GS	
(England)	Sheffield Wednesday	GS							
(England)	Sunderland	GS		GS		Q	Q		
(England)	Swindon Town	W	GS			Q		GS	
(England)	West Bromwich Albion	GS	GS				GS		SF
(England)	Wolverhampton Wanderers	GS				Q	Q	GS	
(Italy)	Fiorentina	GS			RU		GS		
(Italy)	Juventus	GS							
(Italy)	Lazio	GS			GS				
(Italy)	Napoli	RU							
(Italy)	Roma	GS	GS	W	GS				
(Italy)	Lanerossi Vicenza	GS		GS					
(England)	Blackpool		W	RU	GS				
(England)	Crystal Palace		GS		SF		Q		
(England)	Huddersfield Town		GS						
(England)	Stoke City		GS	GS			GS	SF	GS
(Italy)	Bologna		RU		SF				
(Italy)	Cagliari		GS	GS					
(Italy)	Inter Milan		GS						
(Italy)	Sampdoria		GS	GS					
(Italy)	Verona		GS		GS				
(England)	Birmingham City			GS		GS	Q		QF
(England)	Carlisle United			GS					
(England)	Leicester City			GS		Q	Q		
(Italy)	Atalanta			GS				GS	
(Italy)	Catanzaro			GS					
(England)	Fulham				GS				
(England)	Hull City				GS				
(England)	Luton Town				GS	Q	Q		GS
(England)	Manchester United				GS				
(England)	Newcastle United				W	GS			
(England)	Oxford United				GS	Q	Q		
(Italy)	Bari				GS	SF			
(Italy)	Como				GS				
(Italy)	Torino				GS				
(England)	West Ham United					GS			
(England)	Portsmouth					GS	GS		
(England)	Tranmere Rovers					GS	Q	GS	
(England)	Millwall					Q	Q		
(England)	Derby County					RU	Q	GS	
(England)	Grimsby Town					Q	Q		
(England)	Peterborough United					Q	Q		
(England)	Charlton Athletic					Q	GS		
(England)	Barnsley					Q	Q		
(England)	Bristol City					GS	Q		
(England)	Watford					Q	Q		
(England)	Notts County					Q	RU	W	
(England)	Southend United					Q	SF		GS
(England)	Brentford					SF			
(England)	Cambridge United					Q			
(England)	Bristol Rovers					Q			
(Italy)	Ascoli					GS	GS	RU	
(Italy)	Cesena					GS		GS	SF
(Italy)	Cosenza					GS	GS		
(Italy)	Cremonese					W			
(Italy)	Lucchese					GS			
(Italy)	Pisa					GS	GS		
(Italy)	Reggiana					GS			GS
(England)	Bolton Wanderers						GS		
(England)	Nottingham Forest						Q		
(Italy)	Ancona						GS	SF	GS
(Italy)	Brescia						W		GS
(Italy)	Padova						GS		
(Italy)	Pescara						SF		
(England)	Sheffield United							GS	
(Italy)	Lecce							GS	
(Italy)	Piacenza							GS	
(Italy)	Udinese							GS	
(Italy)	Venezia							GS	
(England)	Ipswich Town								QF
(England)	Oldham Athletic								GS
(England)	Port Vale								RU
(Italy)	Foggia								QF
(Italy)	Genoa								W
(Italy)	Perugia								GS
(Italy)	Salernitana								QF

Key

W	RU	SF	QF	GS	Q

Won tournament; runner-up; lost in semi-final (English or Italian final); lost in quarter-final (English or Italian semi-final); eliminated in group stage; eliminated in preliminary qualifying.

== Performance by nation ==
Nation	Winners
Italy	15
England	6

== See also ==
- Anglo-Italian League Cup – a two-legged fixture between the winners of the FA Cup and the Coppa Italia, played intermittently from 1969 to 1976
- Coppa Ottorino Barassi – a two-legged fixture contested from 1968 to 1976 between the Italian Coppa Italia Dilettanti winner and the English FA Amateur Cup winner (1968–74) or the Isthmian League Second Division champion (1975–76).
