= 2017–18 V-League Women's (South Korea) =

2017–18 V-League (South Korea)
- League: V-League (South Korea)
- Duration: October 14, 2017
- Teams: 6

Seasons
- ← 2016–17 2018–19 →

The 2017–18 V-League Women's season was the 14th season of the V-League, the highest professional volleyball league in South Korea. The season started on 14 October 2017 and was scheduled to finish on 13 May 2018. The championship was won by Gyeongbuk Gimcheon Hi-pass.

== Teams ==
Locations of the 2017–18 V-League Women's

=== Stadiums and locations ===
| Team | Location | Stadium | Capacity |
|---|---|---|---|
| Daejeon KGC | Daejeon | Chungmu Gymnasium | 6,000 |
| Gimcheon Korea Expressway Hi-pass | Gimcheon | Gimcheon Gymnasium | 5,145 |
| GS Caltex Seoul KIXX | Seoul | Jangchung Gymnasium | 4,618 |
| Hwaseong IBK Altos | Hwaseong | Hwaseong Gymnasium | 5,152 |
| Incheon Heungkuk Life Pink Spiders | Incheon | Gyeyang Gymnasium | 5,000 |
| Suwon Hyundai E&C Hillstate | Suwon | Suwon Gymnasium | 5,145 |

=== Personnel and sponsoring ===
| Team | Head coach | Team captain | Main Sponsor |
|---|---|---|---|
| Daejeon KGC | (South Korea) Seo Nam-won | (South Korea) Lee Jae-eun | KT&G |
| Gyeongbuk Gimcheon Hi-pass | (South Korea) Kim Jong-min | (South Korea) Jeong Dae-young | Korea Expressway Corporation |
| GS Caltex Seoul KIXX | (South Korea) Cha Sang-hyun | (South Korea) Na Hyeon-jung | GS Caltex |
| Hwaseong IBK Altos | (South Korea) Lee Jeong-cheol | (South Korea) Kim Hee-jin | Industrial Bank of Korea |
| Incheon Heungkuk Life Pink Spiders | (South Korea) Park Mi-hee | (South Korea) Jo Song-hwa | Heungkuk Life |
| Suwon Hyundai E&C Hillstate | (South Korea) Lee Do-hee | (South Korea) Yang Hyo-jin | Hyundai Engineering & Construction |

== Season standing procedure ==
1. Number of matches won
2. Match points
3. Sets ratio
4. Points ratio
5. Result of the last match between the tied teams

Match won 3–0 or 3–1: 3 match points for the winner, 0 match points for the loser
Match won 3–2: 2 match points for the winner, 1 match point for the loser

== Regular season ==
=== League table ===
| Pos | Team | Pld | W | L | Pts | SW | SL | SR | SPR | Qualification |
|---|---|---|---|---|---|---|---|---|---|---|
| 1 | Gyeongbuk Gimcheon Hi-pass | 30 | 21 | 9 | 62 | 75 | 45 | 1.667 | 1.075 | Finals |
| 2 | Hwaseong IBK Altos | 30 | 21 | 9 | 61 | 74 | 42 | 1.762 | 1.073 | Semifinals |
| 3 | Suwon Hyundai E&C Hillstate | 30 | 14 | 16 | 46 | 58 | 58 | 1.000 | 1.016 | Semifinals |
| 5 | GS Caltex | 30 | 12 | 16 | 40 | 55 | 62 | 0.887 | 1.001 | |
| 4 | Daejeon KGC | 30 | 11 | 18 | 35 | 46 | 68 | 0.676 | 0.925 | |
| 6 | Heungkuk Life Pink Spiders | 30 | 8 | 22 | 26 | 43 | 76 | 0.566 | 0.919 | |

=== 1st round ===
| Date | Time | | Score | | Set 1 | Set 2 | Set 3 | Set 4 | Set 5 | Total | Report |
|---|---|---|---|---|---|---|---|---|---|---|---|
| 14 Oct | 16:00 | Hwaseong IBK Altos | 3–2 | Heungkuk Life Pink Spiders | 11–25 | 25–23 | 25–22 | 20–25 | 15–13 | 96–108 | |
| 15 Oct | 16:00 | Daejeon KGC | 2–3 | Suwon Hyundai E&C Hillstate | 25–23 | 23–25 | 25–21 | 15–25 | 20–22 | 108–116 | |
| 17 Oct | 17:00 | Gyeongbuk Gimcheon Hi-pass | 2–3 | GS Caltex | 23–25 | 21–25 | 26–24 | 25–21 | 12–15 | 107–110 | |
| 18 Oct | 17:00 | Hwaseong IBK Altos | 2–3 | Suwon Hyundai E&C Hillstate | 20–25 | 25–19 | 21–25 | 25–21 | 10–15 | 101–105 | |
| 21 Oct | 16:00 | Heungkuk Life Pink Spiders | 3–2 | Daejeon KGC | 23–25 | 25–19 | 20–25 | 25–22 | 15–5 | 108–96 | |
| 22 Oct | 16:00 | Gyeongbuk Gimcheon Hi-pass | 2–3 | Hwaseong IBK Altos | 15–25 | 20–25 | 25–22 | 25–17 | 11–15 | 96–104 | |
| 24 Oct | 17:00 | Daejeon KGC | 3–1 | GS Caltex | 25–23 | 19–25 | 25–21 | 36–34 | | 105–103 | |
| 25 Oct | 17:00 | Suwon Hyundai E&C Hillstate | 3–0 | Heungkuk Life Pink Spiders | 25–13 | 25–22 | 25–14 | | | 75–49 | |
| 28 Oct | 16:00 | Suwon Hyundai E&C Hillstate | 3–0 | GS Caltex | 25–22 | 25–18 | 25–20 | | | 75–60 | |
| 29 Oct | 16:00 | Daejeon KGC | 3–2 | Gyeongbuk Gimcheon Hi-pass | 27–29 | 20–25 | 25–19 | 25–19 | 15–9 | 112–101 | |
| 31 Oct | 17:00 | GS Caltex | 0–3 | Hwaseong IBK Altos | 22–25 | 23–25 | 16–25 | | | 61–75 | |
| 1 Nov | 17:00 | Heungkuk Life Pink Spiders | 0–3 | Gyeongbuk Gimcheon Hi-pass | 20–25 | 18–25 | 16–25 | | | 54–75 | |
| 4 Nov | 16:00 | GS Caltex | 3–2 | Heungkuk Life Pink Spiders | 21–25 | 23–25 | 25–16 | 27–25 | 15–10 | 111–101 | |
| 5 Nov | 16:00 | Gyeongbuk Gimcheon Hi-pass | 3–1 | Suwon Hyundai E&C Hillstate | 25–14 | 25–21 | 25–27 | 25–20 | | 100–82 | |
| 7 Nov | 17:00 | Hwaseong IBK Altos | 2–3 | Daejeon KGC | 25–19 | 22–25 | 25–20 | 14–25 | 12–15 | 98–104 | |

=== 2nd round ===
| Date | Time | | Score | | Set 1 | Set 2 | Set 3 | Set 4 | Set 5 | Total | Report |
|---|---|---|---|---|---|---|---|---|---|---|---|
| 8 Nov | 17:00 | Suwon Hyundai E&C Hillstate | 2–3 | GS Caltex | 25–18 | 28–30 | 14–25 | 25–21 | 10–15 | 102–109 | |
| 9 Nov | 17:00 | Gyeongbuk Gimcheon Hi-pass | 3–0 | Heungkuk Life Pink Spiders | 25–19 | 34–32 | 25–20 | | | 84–71 | |
| 11 Nov | 16:00 | Daejeon KGC | 0–3 | Hwaseong IBK Altos | 22–25 | 14–25 | 20–25 | | | 56–75 | |
| 12 Nov | 14:00 | GS Caltex | 0–3 | Heungkuk Life Pink Spiders | 25–27 | 20–25 | 23–25 | | | 68–77 | |
| 14 Nov | 17:00 | Suwon Hyundai E&C Hillstate | 3–1 | Gyeongbuk Gimcheon Hi-pass | 25–21 | 21–25 | 25–13 | 25–17 | | 96–76 | |
| 15 Nov | 17:00 | Daejeon KGC | 3–0 | Heungkuk Life Pink Spiders | 25–15 | 25–16 | 25–15 | | | 75–46 | |
| 16 Nov | 17:00 | Hwaseong IBK Altos | 2–3 | GS Caltex | 21–25 | 25–19 | 25–22 | 20–25 | 18–20 | 109–111 | |
| 18 Nov | 16:00 | Gyeongbuk Gimcheon Hi-pass | 3–2 | Daejeon KGC | 24–26 | 25–21 | 25–18 | 15–25 | 15–10 | 104–100 | |
| 19 Nov | 16:00 | Suwon Hyundai E&C Hillstate | 3–0 | Heungkuk Life Pink Spiders | 25–22 | 25–21 | 25–16 | | | 75–59 | |
| 21 Nov | 17:00 | GS Caltex | 1–3 | Gyeongbuk Gimcheon Hi-pass | 25–20 | 19–25 | 21–25 | 16–25 | | 81–95 | |
| 22 Nov | 17:00 | Suwon Hyundai E&C Hillstate | 3–0 | Hwaseong IBK Altos | 25–17 | 25–21 | 25–13 | | | 75–51 | |
| 25 Nov | 16:00 | Heungkuk Life Pink Spiders | 2–3 | Hwaseong IBK Altos | 25–17 | 21–25 | 25–15 | 24–26 | 13–15 | 108–98 | |
| 26 Nov | 16:00 | Suwon Hyundai E&C Hillstate | 0–3 | Daejeon KGC | 22–25 | 20–25 | 23–25 | | | 65–75 | |
| 28 Nov | 17:00 | Hwaseong IBK Altos | 0–3 | Gyeongbuk Gimcheon Hi-pass | 24–26 | 20–25 | 22–25 | | | 66–76 | |
| 29 Nov | 17:00 | GS Caltex | 3–0 | Daejeon KGC | 25–17 | 25–20 | 25–15 | | | 75–52 | |

=== 3rd round ===
| Date | Time | | Score | | Set 1 | Set 2 | Set 3 | Set 4 | Set 5 | Total | Report |
|---|---|---|---|---|---|---|---|---|---|---|---|
| 2 Dec | 16:00 | Hwaseong IBK Altos | 3–0 | Heungkuk Life Pink Spiders | 25–18 | 25–19 | 25–14 | | | 75–51 | |
| 3 Dec | 16:00 | Gyeongbuk Gimcheon Hi-pass | 3–0 | Daejeon KGC | 25–11 | 25–18 | 25–17 | | | 75–46 | |
| 5 Dec | 17:00 | Suwon Hyundai E&C Hillstate | 2–3 | Hwaseong IBK Altos | 25–22 | 23–25 | 12–25 | 28–26 | 11–15 | 99–113 | |
| 6 Dec | 17:00 | Gyeongbuk Gimcheon Hi-pass | 3–0 | GS Caltex | 25–20 | 25–22 | 25–21 | | | 75–63 | |
| 9 Dec | 16:00 | GS Caltex | 0–3 | Suwon Hyundai E&C Hillstate | 21–25 | 16–25 | 21–25 | | | 58–75 | |
| 10 Dec | 16:00 | Heungkuk Life Pink Spiders | 3–0 | Daejeon KGC | 25–23 | 25–22 | 25–19 | | | 75–64 | |
| 12 Dec | 17:00 | Hwaseong IBK Altos | 1–3 | Gyeongbuk Gimcheon Hi-pass | 20–25 | 15–25 | 25–21 | 19–25 | | 79–96 | |
| 13 Dec | 17:00 | GS Caltex | 3–0 | Daejeon KGC | 25–22 | 25–13 | 25–8 | | | 75–43 | |
| 14 Dec | 17:00 | Heungkuk Life Pink Spiders | 3–0 | Suwon Hyundai E&C Hillstate | 25–22 | 25–22 | 27–25 | | | 77–69 | |
| 16 Dec | 16:00 | Hwaseong IBK Altos | 3–0 | GS Caltex | 25–21 | 25–18 | 25–22 | | | 75–61 | |
| 17 Dec | 16:00 | Heungkuk Life Pink Spiders | 2–3 | Gyeongbuk Gimcheon Hi-pass | 25–23 | 25–22 | 23–25 | 17–25 | 8–15 | 98–110 | |
| 20 Dec | 17:00 | Daejeon KGC | 0–3 | Suwon Hyundai E&C Hillstate | 13–25 | 20–25 | 16–25 | | | 49–75 | |
| 23 Dec | 16:00 | Suwon Hyundai E&C Hillstate | 1–3 | Gyeongbuk Gimcheon Hi-pass | 25–21 | 15–25 | 23–25 | 20–25 | | 83–96 | |
| 24 Dec | 16:00 | Daejeon KGC | 1–3 | Hwaseong IBK Altos | 19–25 | 20–25 | 25–23 | 21–25 | | 85–98 | |
| 25 Dec | 16:00 | Heungkuk Life Pink Spiders | 2–3 | GS Caltex | 25–17 | 19–25 | 25–21 | 22–25 | 13–15 | 104–103 | |

=== 4th round ===
| Date | Time | | Score | | Set 1 | Set 2 | Set 3 | Set 4 | Set 5 | Total | Report |
|---|---|---|---|---|---|---|---|---|---|---|---|
| 27 Dec | 17:00 | Gyeongbuk Gimcheon Hi-pass | 1–3 | Suwon Hyundai E&C Hillstate | 23–25 | 14–25 | 25–23 | 15–25 | | 77–98 | |
| 30 Dec | 16:00 | Daejeon KGC | 3–1 | GS Caltex | 25–17 | 17–25 | 25–18 | 25–23 | | 92–83 | |
| 31 Dec | 16:00 | Gyeongbuk Gimcheon Hi-pass | 3–2 | Heungkuk Life Pink Spiders | 16–25 | 25–23 | 25–18 | 18–25 | 15–13 | 99–104 | |
| 1 Jan | 16:00 | Hwaseong IBK Altos | 3–1 | Suwon Hyundai E&C Hillstate | 25–21 | 25–15 | 19–25 | 25–17 | | 94–78 | |
| 3 Jan | 17:00 | Heungkuk Life Pink Spiders | 3–2 | GS Caltex | 25–16 | 25–18 | 17–25 | 21–25 | 15–13 | 103–97 | |
| 6 Jan | 16:00 | GS Caltex | 0–3 | Hwaseong IBK Altos | 23–25 | 17–25 | 22–25 | | | 62–75 | |
| 7 Jan | 16:00 | Suwon Hyundai E&C Hillstate | 1–3 | Daejeon KGC | 21–25 | 25–23 | 19–25 | 16–25 | | 81–98 | |
| 9 Jan | 17:00 | GS Caltex | 2–3 | Gyeongbuk Gimcheon Hi-pass | 25–22 | 19–25 | 29–27 | 30–32 | 9–15 | 112–121 | |
| 10 Jan | 17:00 | Hwaseong IBK Altos | 3–0 | Daejeon KGC | 25–21 | 25–16 | 25–23 | | | 75–60 | |
| 11 Jan | 17:00 | Suwon Hyundai E&C Hillstate | 3–1 | Heungkuk Life Pink Spiders | 21–25 | 25–17 | 25–20 | 28–26 | | 99–88 | |
| 13 Jan | 16:00 | Daejeon KGC | 3–2 | Gyeongbuk Gimcheon Hi-pass | 22–25 | 28–26 | 25–23 | 21–25 | 15–13 | 111–112 | |
| 14 Jan | 16:00 | Heungkuk Life Pink Spiders | 0–3 | Hwaseong IBK Altos | 17–25 | 18–25 | 22–25 | | | 57–75 | |
| 16 Jan | 17:00 | GS Caltex | 1–3 | Suwon Hyundai E&C Hillstate | 25–19 | 18–25 | 20–25 | 13–25 | | 76–94 | |
| 17 Jan | 17:00 | Gyeongbuk Gimcheon Hi-pass | 3–1 | Hwaseong IBK Altos | 25–13 | 20–25 | 25–17 | 25–15 | | 95–70 | |
| 18 Jan | 17:00 | Daejeon KGC | 3–1 | Heungkuk Life Pink Spiders | 19–25 | 25–21 | 26–24 | 25–19 | | 95–89 | |

=== 5th round ===
| Date | Time | | Score | | Set 1 | Set 2 | Set 3 | Set 4 | Set 5 | Total | Report |
|---|---|---|---|---|---|---|---|---|---|---|---|
| 25 Jan | 17:00 | Gyeongbuk Gimcheon Hi-pass | 3–2 | Suwon Hyundai E&C Hillstate | 23–25 | 25–21 | 25–21 | 22–25 | 15–8 | 110–100 | |
| 27 Jan | 16:00 | Hwaseong IBK Altos | 3–0 | Heungkuk Life Pink Spiders | 25–16 | 25–19 | 25–14 | | | 75–49 | |
| 28 Jan | 16:00 | GS Caltex | 3–0 | Daejeon KGC | 25–13 | 25–22 | 25–18 | | | 75–53 | |
| 30 Jan | 17:00 | Hwaseong IBK Altos | 3–2 | Gyeongbuk Gimcheon Hi-pass | 25–14 | 25–22 | 27–29 | 17–25 | 15–12 | 109–102 | |
| 31 Jan | 17:00 | Daejeon KGC | 3–0 | Suwon Hyundai E&C Hillstate | 25–19 | 25–23 | 25–19 | | | 75–61 | |
| 3 Feb | 16:00 | Daejeon KGC | 2–3 | Heungkuk Life Pink Spiders | 22–25 | 20–25 | 25–13 | 25–17 | 13–15 | 105–95 | |
| 4 Feb | 16:00 | GS Caltex | 2–3 | Gyeongbuk Gimcheon Hi-pass | 25–20 | 25–23 | 29–31 | 15–25 | 13–15 | 107–114 | |
| 6 Feb | 17:00 | Suwon Hyundai E&C Hillstate | 3–1 | Hwaseong IBK Altos | 23–25 | 25–22 | 25–23 | 25–22 | | 98–92 | |
| 7 Feb | 17:00 | Heungkuk Life Pink Spiders | 1–3 | GS Caltex | 20–25 | 25–23 | 23–25 | 21–25 | | 89–98 | |
| 8 Feb | 17:00 | Gyeongbuk Gimcheon Hi-pass | 3–0 | Daejeon KGC | 25–13 | 32–30 | 25–22 | | | 82–65 | |
| 10 Feb | 17:00 | Heungkuk Life Pink Spiders | 1–3 | Suwon Hyundai E&C Hillstate | 25–18 | 16–25 | 30–32 | 16–25 | | 87–100 | |
| 11 Feb | 16:00 | Hwaseong IBK Altos | 3–2 | GS Caltex | 17–25 | 25–27 | 26–24 | 25–13 | 16–14 | 109–103 | |
| 13 Feb | 17:00 | Heungkuk Life Pink Spiders | 1–3 | Gyeongbuk Gimcheon Hi-pass | 21–25 | 25–18 | 10–25 | 18–25 | | 74–93 | |
| 14 Feb | 17:00 | Daejeon KGC | 0–3 | Hwaseong IBK Altos | 20–25 | 16–25 | 15–25 | | | 51–75 | |
| 15 Feb | 16:00 | Suwon Hyundai E&C Hillstate | 0–3 | GS Caltex | 21–25 | 23–25 | 21–25 | | | 65–75 | |

=== 6th round ===
| Date | Time | | Score | | Set 1 | Set 2 | Set 3 | Set 4 | Set 5 | Total | Report |
|---|---|---|---|---|---|---|---|---|---|---|---|
| 17 Feb | 16:00 | Gyeongbuk Gimcheon Hi-pass | 0–3 | Hwaseong IBK Altos | 17–25 | 18–25 | 20–25 | | | 55–75 | |
| 18 Feb | 16:00 | Heungkuk Life Pink Spiders | 2–3 | Daejeon KGC | 18–25 | 20–25 | 25–15 | 25–22 | 12–15 | 100–102 | |
| 20 Feb | 17:00 | GS Caltex | 3–2 | Suwon Hyundai E&C Hillstate | 25–27 | 25–18 | 18–25 | 25–21 | 16–14 | 109–105 | |
| 21 Feb | 17:00 | Heungkuk Life Pink Spiders | 3–2 | Hwaseong IBK Altos | 25–22 | 25–13 | 21–25 | 18–25 | 19–17 | 108–102 | |
| 22 Feb | 17:00 | Daejeon KGC | 0–3 | Gyeongbuk Gimcheon Hi-pass | 23–25 | 23–25 | 20–25 | | | 66–75 | |
| 24 Feb | 16:00 | GS Caltex | 3–0 | Heungkuk Life Pink Spiders | 25–20 | 25–23 | 25–20 | | | 75–63 | |
| 25 Feb | 16:00 | Hwaseong IBK Altos | 3–0 | Suwon Hyundai E&C Hillstate | 25–18 | 25–20 | 25–16 | | | 75–54 | |
| 28 Feb | 17:00 | Suwon Hyundai E&C Hillstate | 0–3 | Gyeongbuk Gimcheon Hi-pass | 18–25 | 18–25 | 18–25 | | | 54–75 | |
| 1 Mar | 16:00 | Daejeon KGC | 1–3 | GS Caltex | 20–25 | 18–25 | 25–20 | 14–25 | | 77–95 | |
| 3 Mar | 16:00 | Gyeongbuk Gimcheon Hi-pass | 3–0 | Heungkuk Life Pink Spiders | 25–15 | 25–19 | 25–22 | | | 75–56 | |
| 4 Mar | 16:00 | Suwon Hyundai E&C Hillstate | 2–3 | Daejeon KGC | 25–19 | 21–25 | 25–21 | 20–25 | 13–15 | 104–105 | |
| 6 Mar | 17:00 | GS Caltex | 1–3 | Hwaseong IBK Altos | 25–21 | 24–26 | 23–25 | 19–25 | | 91–97 | |
| 10 Mar | 16:00 | Gyeongbuk Gimcheon Hi-pass | 0–3 | GS Caltex | 19–25 | 21–25 | 18–25 | | | 58–75 | |
| 11 Mar | 16:00 | Hwaseong IBK Altos | 3–0 | Daejeon KGC | 25–22 | 25–13 | 25–19 | | | 75–54 | |
| 13 Mar | 17:00 | Heungkuk Life Pink Spiders | 3–2 | Suwon Hyundai E&C Hillstate | 23–25 | 25–21 | 16–25 | 27–25 | 15–9 | 106–105 | |

== Play-offs ==
=== Bracket ===
Semifinals
1 | Gyeongbuk Gimcheon Hi-pass
2 | Hwaseong IBK Altos | 3 | 1 | 3
3 | Suwon Hyundai E&C Hillstate | 0 | 3 | 0

Finals
1 | Gyeongbuk Gimcheon Hi-pass | 3 | 3 | 3
2 | Hwaseong IBK Altos | 2 | 1 | 1

=== Semifinals ===
| Date | Time | | Score | | Set 1 | Set 2 | Set 3 | Set 4 | Set 5 | Total | Report |
|---|---|---|---|---|---|---|---|---|---|---|---|
| 17 Mar | 14:00 | Hwaseong IBK Altos | 3–0 | Suwon Hyundai E&C Hillstate | 25–15 | 25–21 | 25–20 | | | 75–56 | |
| 19 Mar | 19:00 | Suwon Hyundai E&C Hillstate | 3–1 | Hwaseong IBK Altos | 18–25 | 25–20 | 25–23 | 28–26 | | 96–94 | |
| 21 Mar | 19:00 | Hwaseong IBK Altos | 3–0 | Suwon Hyundai E&C Hillstate | 25–19 | 25–17 | 26–24 | | | 76–60 | |

=== Finals ===
| Date | Time | | Score | | Set 1 | Set 2 | Set 3 | Set 4 | Set 5 | Total | Report |
|---|---|---|---|---|---|---|---|---|---|---|---|
| 23 Mar | 19:00 | Gyeongbuk Gimcheon Hi-pass | 3–2 | Hwaseong IBK Altos | 25–23 | 25–20 | 23–25 | 23–25 | 17–15 | 113–108 | |
| 25 Mar | 14:27 | Gyeongbuk Gimcheon Hi-pass | 3–1 | Hwaseong IBK Altos | 20–25 | 25–16 | 25–23 | 25–18 | | 95–82 | |
| 27 Mar | 19:00 | Hwaseong IBK Altos | 1–3 | Gyeongbuk Gimcheon Hi-pass | 24–26 | 16–25 | 25–21 | 12–25 | | 77–97 | |

== Final standing ==
| Rank | Team |
|---|---|
| 1st place, gold medalist(s) | Gyeongbuk Gimcheon Hi-pass |
| 2nd place, silver medalist(s) | Hwaseong IBK Altos |
| 3rd place, bronze medalist(s) | Suwon Hyundai E&C Hillstate |
| 4 | GS Caltex |
| 5 | Daejeon KGC |
| 6 | Heungkuk Life Pink Spiders |

2017–18 V-League Women's Champions
Gyeongbuk Gimcheon Hi-pass
1st title
