= 2012 AVC Cup for Women squads =

This article shows the women's squads of the participating teams at the 2012 Asian Women's Cup Volleyball Championship.

== China ==
No.	Name	Date of birth	Position	Club
-	Yu Juemin		coach	
1	Wang Yimei	11 January 1988	opposite	(China) Liaoning Volleyball
2	Mi Yang	24 January 1989	setter	(China) Tianjin Volleyball
4	Hui Ruoqi	4 March 1991	outside hitter	(China) Jiangsu Volleyball
6	Chu Jinling	29 July 1984	outside hitter	(China) Liaoning Volleyball
7	Zhang Xian	16 March 1985	libero	(China) Liaoning Volleyball
8	Wei Qiuyue	26 September 1988	setter	(China) Tianjin Volleyball
9	Yang Junjing	11 May 1989	middle blocker	(China) Bayi Volleyball
10	Shan Danna	8 October 1991	libero	(China) Zhejiang Volleyball
11	Xu Yunli	2 August 1987	middle blocker	(China) Fujian Volleyball
12	Zeng Chunlei	3 November 1989	opposite	(China) Beijing Volleyball
15	Ma Yunwen	19 October 1988	middle blocker	(China) Shanghai Volleyball
17	Zhang Lei	11 January 1985	opposite	(China) Shanghai Volleyball

== South Korea ==
No.	Name	Date of birth	Position	Club
-	Hong Sung-Jin	6 November 1963	coach	(South Korea) KVA
2	Kang Min-Jeong	24 May 1986	middle blocker	(South Korea) Suwon Hyundai Engineering & Construction Hillstate
3	Si Eun-Mi	3 July 1990	setter	(South Korea) GS Caltex Seoul KIXX
5	Kim Hae-Ran	16 March 1984	libero	(South Korea) Seongnam Korea Expressway Hi-pass
6	Lee So-Jin	28 August 1987	setter	(South Korea) Hwaseong IBK Industrial Bank Altos
9	Lee Yeon-Ju	1 March 1990	outside hitter	(South Korea) Daejeon KGC
11	Han Yoo-Mi	5 February 1982	outside hitter	(South Korea) Daejeon KGC
12	Han Song-Yi	5 September 1984	opposite	(South Korea) GS Caltex Seoul KIXX
14	Choi You-Jeong	17 October 1992	middle blocker	(South Korea) GS Caltex Seoul KIXX
15	Kim Jin-Hee	22 March 1993	opposite	(South Korea) Suwon Hyundai Engineering & Construction Hillstate
16	Moon Jung-Won	24 March 1992	outside hitter	(South Korea) Seongnam Korea Expressway Hi-pass
17	Yang Hyo-Jin	14 December 1989	middle blocker	(South Korea) Suwon Hyundai Engineering & Construction Hillstate
19	Kim Hee-Jin	29 April 1991	middle blocker	(South Korea) Hwaseong IBK Industrial Bank Altos

== Japan ==
No.	Name	Date of birth	Position	Club
-	Masayoshi Manabe	21 August 1963	coach	
1	Nanami Inoue	19 June 1989	middle blocker	(Japan) Denso Airybees
6	Kaori Kodaira	13 April 1990	outside hitter	(Japan) Toray Arrows
7	Saki Minemura	18 April 1990	outside hitter	(Japan) Toray Arrows
8	Risa Ishii	19 May 1990	outside hitter	(Japan) Denso Airybees
10	Kanami Tashiro	25 March 1991	setter	(Japan) Toray Arrows
11	Erika Sakae	3 April 1991	setter	(Japan) Denso Airybees
12	Yuki Ishii	8 May 1991	outside hitter	(Japan) Hisamitsu Springs
13	Saki Mashiba	30 May 1991	libero	
15	Miyu Nagaoka	25 July 1991	opposite	(Japan) Hisamitsu Springs
18	Azusa Futami	15 May 1992	middle blocker	(Japan) Toray Arrows
19	Yurie Nabeya	15 December 1993	outside hitter	(Japan) Denso Airybees
20	Riho Otake	23 December 1993	middle blocker	(Japan) Denso Airybees

== Iran ==
No.	Name	Date of birth	Position	Club
-	Mitra Shabanian		coach	
1	Zahra Vahedi	14 February 1984		
6	Shabnam Alikhani	25 September 1992		(Iran) Pasand Isfahan VC
7	Fatemeh Rashidi	17 June 1985		(Iran) Pasand Isfahan VC
8	Mahsa Saberi	14 February 1993		
9	Mona Roosta	21 March 1993		
11	Faranak Babolian	17 April 1992		
12	Mahsa Kadkhoda	22 June 1993		
13	Negar Kiani	8 June 1992	libero	(Iran) Pasand Isfahan VC
14	Farzaneh Zarei	29 October 1991		
16	Farnoosh Sheikhi	13 May 1990		
17	Shekoufeh Safari	7 March 1989		(Iran) Pasand Isfahan VC
19	Mahtab Rahmani	25 August 1992		

== Kazakhstan ==
No.	Name	Date of birth	Position	Club
-	Oleksandr Gutor		coach	
1	Irina Shenberger	20 February 1992		
3	Sana Jarlagassova	21 July 1989	outside hitter	
4	Olga Karpova	10 June 1980	middle blocker	(Kazakhstan) Zhetysu Almaty
5	Olga Nassedkina	28 December 1982	middle blocker	(Kazakhstan) Zhetysu Almaty
7	Alena Omelchenko	19 June 1989	middle blocker	
8	Korinna Ishimtseva	4 February 1984	setter	(Kazakhstan) Zhetysu Almaty
9	Irina Lukomskaya	19 March 1991	setter	(Kazakhstan) Zhetysu Almaty
11	Marina Storozhenko	6 June 1985	libero	(Kazakhstan) Zhetysu Almaty
14	Alessya Safranova	10 February 1986		
15	Lyudmila Anarbayeva	12 November 1983	middle blocker	(Kazakhstan) Zhetysu Almaty
16	Inna Matveyeva	12 October 1978	outside hitter	
17	Olga Drobyshevskaya	22 September 1985	outside hitter	(Kazakhstan) Zhetysu Almaty

== Chinese Taipei ==
No.	Name	Date of birth	Position	Club
-	Norimasa Sakakuchi		coach	
1	Chien Huang-ying	10 September 1994		(Chinese Taipei) Taiwan Power
2	Wang Sin-ting	17 October 1992	middle blocker	(Chinese Taipei) Taiwan Power
3	Hsiao I-ling	10 October 1992		(Chinese Taipei) Taiwan Power
6	Hsu Hiu-chun	28 January 1994		(Chinese Taipei) Taiwan Power
7	Teng Yen-min	9 February 1984	outside hitter	(Chinese Taipei) Taiwan Power
8	Chang Li-wen	27 February 1995		(Chinese Taipei) Taiwan Power
10	Chen Wan-ting	25 November 1990	opposite	(Chinese Taipei) NTNU
11	Chen Wan-ching	16 June 1988	setter	(Chinese Taipei) NTNU
12	Yang Meng-hua	15 August 1991	libero	(Chinese Taipei) Taiwan Power
13	Wen I-tzu	31 October 1991	middle blocker	(Chinese Taipei) Taiwan Power
16	Tsai Yin-feng	6 November 1984	middle blocker	(Chinese Taipei) Taiwan Power
18	Chang Li-ting	17 February 1996		(Chinese Taipei) Taiwan Power

== Thailand ==
No.	Name	Date of birth	Position	Club
-	Kiattipong Radchatagriengkai	17 July 1966	coach	
1	Wanna Buakaew	2 January 1981	libero	(Thailand) Chang
2	Piyanut Pannoy	10 November 1989	libero	(Azerbaijan) Azərreyl Baku
5	Pleumjit Thinkaow	9 November 1983	middle blocker	(China) Fujian Xi Meng Bao
6	Onuma Sittirak	13 June 1986	outside hitter	(Thailand) Kathu Phuket
10	Wilavan Apinyapong	6 June 1984	outside hitter	(China) Fujian Xi Meng Bao
11	Amporn Hyapha	19 May 1985	middle blocker	(Indonesia) Jakarta Electric PLN
12	Tapaphaipun Chaisri	29 November 1989	libero	(Thailand) Khonkaen
13	Nootsara Tomkom	7 July 1985	setter	(Azerbaijan) Azərreyl Baku
15	Malika Kanthong	8 January 1987	opposite	(Thailand) Nonthaburi
16	Pornpun Guedpard	5 May 1993	setter	(Thailand) Nonthaburi
18	Ajcharaporn Kongyot	18 June 1995	middle blocker	(Thailand) Supremre Nakhon Si
19	Sontaya Keawbundit	9 February 1991	outside hitter	(Philippines) RC Cola Raiders

== Vietnam ==
No.	Name	Date of birth	Position	Club
-	Pham Van Long		Coach	(Vietnam) Thông tin Liên Việt Post Bank
2	Bui Thi Nga	15 August 1994	Middle blocker	(Vietnam) Thông tin Liên Việt Post Bank
3	Hà Thị Hoa	16 May 1984	Setter	(Vietnam) Vietinbank VC
5	Pham Thi Kim Hue	3 August 1982	Middle blocker	(Vietnam) Vietinbank VC
6	Dinh Thi Tra Giang	9 May 1992	Middle blocker	(Vietnam) Vietsovpetro VC
7	Pham Thi Yen	20 October 1985	Opposite	(Vietnam) Thông tin Liên Việt Post Bank
8	Do Thi Minh	3 August 1988	Outside hitter	(Vietnam) Thông tin Liên Việt Post Bank
9	Nguyen Thi Ngoc Hoa	10 November 1987	Middle blocker	(Vietnam) VTV Bình Điền Long An
10	Duong Thi Nhan	27 February 1995	Outside hitter	(Vietnam) VTV Bình Điền Long An
11	Nguyen Thi Xuan	10 September 1986	Outside hitter	(Vietnam) Vietinbank VC
14	Tran Thi Cam Tu	19 April 1989	Opposite	
15	Ta Thi Dieu Linh	19 March 1990	Libero	(Vietnam) Thông tin Liên Việt Post Bank
18	Dao Thi Huyen	3 May 1987	Setter	(Vietnam) Thông tin Liên Việt Post Bank
