= 2014 AVC Cup for Women squads =

This article shows the women's squads of the participating teams at the 2014 Asian Women's Cup Volleyball Championship.

== China ==
- Head coach: Lang Ping

The following is the Chinese roster in the 2014 Asian Cup Championship.

No.	Name	Date of birth	Position	Club
2	Yao Di	15 August 1992	setter	(China) Tianjin
3	Yin Na	3 February 1988	middle blocker	(China) Tianjin
4	Wang Qian	14 March 1990	libero	(China) Tianjin
5	Ding Xia	14 January 1990	setter	(China) Liaoning
6	Yan Ni	2 March 1987	middle blocker	(China) Liaoning
8	Zhang Changning	6 November 1995	outside hitter	(China) Jiangsu
9	Li Jing	9 August 1991	Outside hitter	(China) Zhejiang
10	Zhang Xiaoya	4 October 1992	middle blocker	(China) Sichuan
11	Liu Yanhan	19 January 1993	outside hitter	(China) Bayi
12	Huang Liuyan	14 January 1994	libero	(China) Bayi
13	Wang Qi	22 September 1993	opposite	(China) Bayi
14	Qiao Ting	2 March 1992	opposite	(China) Beijing

== Iran ==
- Head coach: Abbas Barghi

The following is the Iranian roster in the 2014 Asian Cup Championship.

No.	Name	Date of birth	Position	Club
1	Mahdiyeh Khajeh	12 September 1988	outside hitter	Gaz Iran
3	Samaneh Siavashi	14 February 1984	setter	(Iran) Zobahan
6	Shabnam Alikhani	25 September 1992	setter	Gaz Iran
7	Zeinab Giveh	11 July 1983	outside hitter	(Iran) Azad University
8	Mahsa Saberi	14 February 1993	outside hitter	Gaz Iran
9	Neda Chamlanian	7 March 1994	opposite	(Iran) Zobahan
10	Maedeh Borhani	22 June 1988	opposite	(Iran) Azad University
11	Sudabeh Bagherpour	16 September 1990	middle blocker	Gaz Iran
14	Farzaneh Zarei	29 October 1991	outside hitter	(Iran) Zobahan
13	Negar Kiani	8 June 1992	libero	(Iran) Azad University
16	Farnoosh Sheikhi	13 May 1990	middle blocker	Gaz Iran
17	Shekoufeh Safari	7 March 1989	middle blocker	(Iran) Azad University

== Japan ==
- Head coach: Kiyoshi Abo

The following is the Japanese roster in the 2014 Asian Cup Championship.

No.	Name	Date of birth	Position	Club
1	Yuko Suzuki	12 August 1989	setter	(Japan) Denso Airybees
2	Kanami Tashiro	25 March 1991	setter	(Japan) Toray Arrows
3	Rika Nomoto	21 September 1991	outside hitter	(Japan) Hisamitsu Springs
4	Haruyo Shimamura	4 March 1992	middle blocker	(Japan) NEC Red Rockets
5	Mari Horikawa	3 May 1992	outside hitter	(Japan) Toray Arrows
6	Miku Torigoe	16 October 1992	libero	(Japan) NEC Red Rockets
7	Saori Takahashi	9 December 1992	outside hitter	(Japan) Hitachi Rivale
8	Riho Otake	23 December 1993	middle blocker	(Japan) Denso Airybees
9	Nao Muranaga	25 December 1993	outside hitter	(Japan) Kobe Shinwa University
10	Nozomi Itoh	16 February 1995	middle blocker	(Japan) Toray Arrows
11	Arisa Inoue	8 May 1995	outside hitter	(Japan) University of Tsukuba
12	Nanaka Sakamoto	6 September 1996	outside hitter	(Japan) Denso Airybees

== Kazakhstan ==
- Head coach: Oleksandr Gutor

The following is the Kazakhstani roster in the 2014 Asian Cup Championship.

No.	Name	Date of birth	Position	Club
1	Tatyana Mudritskaya	17 January 1985	opposite	(Kazakhstan) Zhetysu Almaty
2	Lyudmila Issayeva	26 September 1989	outside hitter	(Kazakhstan) Zhetysu Almaty
3	Sana Anarkulova	21 July 1989	outside hitter	(Kazakhstan) Zhetysu Almaty
4	Lyudmila Anarbayeva	12 November 1983	middle blocker	(Kazakhstan) Zhetysu Almaty
5	Olga Nassedkina	28 December 1982	middle blocker	(Kazakhstan) Zhetysu Almaty
7	Alena Omelchenko	19 June 1989	middle blocker	(Kazakhstan) Zhetysu Almaty
8	Korinna Ishimtseva	4 February 1984	setter	(Kazakhstan) Zhetysu Almaty
9	Irina Lukomskaya	19 March 1991	setter	(Kazakhstan) Zhetysu Almaty
11	Marina Storozhenko	6 June 1985	libero	(Kazakhstan) Zhetysu Almaty
13	Radmila Beresneva	6 June 1983	outside hitter	(Kazakhstan) Zhetysu Almaty
16	Inna Matveyeva	12 October 1978	outside hitter	(Kazakhstan) Irtysh
20	Tatyana Fendrikova	23 February 1990	libero	(Kazakhstan) Zhetysu Almaty

== South Korea ==
- Head coach: Lee Son-goo

The following is the Korean roster in the 2014 Asian Cup Championship.

No.	Name	Date of birth	Position	Club
3	Lee Hyo-hee	9 September 1980	setter	(South Korea) Seongnam Korea Expressway Hi-pass
4	Kim Hee-jin	29 April 1991	middle blocker	(South Korea) Hwaseong IBK Altos
5	Kim Hae-ran	16 March 1984	libero	(South Korea) Seongnam Korea Expressway Hi-pass
7	Lee Jae-yeong	15 October 1996	outside hitter	(South Korea) Incheon Heungkuk Life Pink Spiders
8	Nam Jie-youn	15 May 1983	libero	(South Korea) Hwaseong IBK Altos
9	Lee Da-yeong	15 October 1996	setter	(South Korea) Suwon Hyundai Engineering & Construction Hillstate
10	Kim Yeon-Koung	26 February 1988	outside hitter	(Turkey) Fenerbahçe
12	Han Song-yi	5 September 1984	opposite	(South Korea) GS Caltex Seoul KIXX
13	Park Jeong-ah	26 March 1993	outside hitter	(South Korea) Hwaseong IBK Altos
14	Yang Hyo-Jin	14 December 1989	middle blocker	(South Korea) Suwon Hyundai Engineering & Construction Hillstate
16	Bae Yoo-na	30 November 1989	middle blocker	(South Korea) GS Caltex Seoul KIXX
19	Baek Mok-hwa	30 August 1989	outside hitter	(South Korea) Daejeon KGC

== Chinese Taipei ==
- Head coach: Huang Chih-nan

The following is the Taiwanese roster in the 2014 Asian Cup Championship.

No.	Name	Date of birth	Position	Club
3	Chang Yu-chia	27 January 1996	setter	(Chinese Taipei) Taiwan Power
5	Chen Yi-ju	21 December 1989	middle blocker	(Chinese Taipei) Taiwan Power
6	Ho Yen-chin	26 November 1987	outside hitter	(Chinese Taipei) Taiwan Power
7	Wu Wei-hua	5 February 1994	libero	(Chinese Taipei) Taiwan Power
8	Yang Yi-chen	4 April 1992	setter	(Chinese Taipei) Taiwan Power
9	Chang Li-wen	27 February 1995	opposite	(Chinese Taipei) Taiwan Power
11	Chen Wan-ting	25 November 1990	opposite	(Chinese Taipei) Taiwan Power
13	Wen I-tzu	31 October 1991	middle blocker	(Chinese Taipei) Taiwan Power
15	Lee Tzu-ying	4 July 1994	outside hitter	(Chinese Taipei) Taiwan Power
16	Tseng Wan-ling	13 May 1996	middle blocker	(Chinese Taipei) Taiwan Power
17	Chang Chen-yin	28 March 1991	outside hitter	(Chinese Taipei) Taiwan Power
18	Chen Tzu-ya	26 August 1997	outside hitter	(Chinese Taipei) Taiwan Power

== Thailand ==
- Head coach: Kiattipong Radchatagriengkai

The following is the Thai roster in the 2014 Asian Cup Championship.

No.	Name	Date of birth	Position	Club
1	Wanna Buakaew	2 January 1981	libero	(Azerbaijan) Igtisadchi Baku
3	Yupa Sanitklang	14 August 1991	libero	(Thailand) Ayutthaya A.T.C.C
7	Hattaya Bamrungsuk	12 September 1993	middle blocker	(Thailand) Nakhon Ratchasima
8	Sineenat Phocharoen	19 May 1995	opposite	(Thailand) Sisaket
9	Chatchu-on Moksri	6 November 1999	outside hitter	(Thailand) Ayutthaya A.T.C.C
11	Wanitchaya Luangtonglang	8 October 1992	outside hitter	(Thailand) Nakhon Ratchasima
14	Jarasporn Bundasak	1 March 1993	middle blocker	(Thailand) Nakhon Ratchasima
16	Pornpun Guedpard	5 May 1993	setter	(Thailand) Sisaket
17	Kuttika Kaewpin	16 August 1994	outside hitter	(Thailand) 3BB Nakhonnont
18	Ajcharaporn Kongyot	18 June 1995	opposite	(Thailand) Supreme Chonburi
19	Kannika Thipachot	3 May 1993	outside hitter	(Thailand) Ayutthaya A.T.C.C
20	Soraya Phomla	6 August 1992	setter	(Thailand) Ayutthaya A.T.C.C

== Vietnam ==
- Head coach: Pham Van Long

The following is the Vietnamese roster in the 2014 Asian Cup Championship.

No.	Name	Date of birth	Position	Club
2	Âu Hồng Nhung	27 May 1993	outside hitter	(Vietnam) Lien Viet Postbank
3	Trần Thị Thanh Thúy	11 December 1997	outside hitter	(Vietnam) VTV Binh Dien
5	Lê Thị Dung	6 December 1994	setter	(Vietnam) Tien Nong Thanh Hoa
6	Đinh Thị Trà Giang	5 September 1992	middle blocker	(Vietnam) Tien Nong Thanh Hoa
7	Hà Ngọc Diễm	20 December 1994	opposite	(Vietnam) Vinh Long
8	Đỗ Thị Minh	3 August 1988	outside hitter	(Vietnam) Lien Viet Postbank
10	Nguyễn Linh Chi	31 July 1990	setter	(Vietnam) Lien Viet Postbank
11	Nguyễn Thị Xuân	10 September 1986	outside hitter	(Vietnam) Vietinbank VC
12	Đinh Thị Thúy	12 April 1998	outside hitter	(Vietnam) Vietinbank VC
15	Nguyễn Thị Kim Liên	10 February 1993	libero	(Vietnam) VTV Binh Dien
16	Bùi Thị Ngà	15 August 1994	middle blocker	(Vietnam) Lien Viet Postbank
17	Lê Thanh Thúy	23 May 1995	middle blocker	(Vietnam) Vietinbank VC
