= 2016 AVC Cup for Women squads =

This article shows the rosters of all participating teams at the 2016 Asian Women's Cup Volleyball Championship in Vinh Phuc, Vietnam.

== China ==
- Head Coach: Chen Youquan

The following is the Chinese roster in the 2016 Asian Cup Championship.

No.	Name	Date of birth	Height	Weight	Spike	Block	2016 club
1	Chen Liyi	27 April 1989	1.84 m (6 ft 0 in)	75 kg (165 lb)	302 cm (119 in)	290 cm (110 in)	(China) Tianjin
5	Li Jing	9 August 1991	1.86 m (6 ft 1 in)	73 kg (161 lb)	310 cm (120 in)	295 cm (116 in)	(China) Zhejiang
6	Yang Zhou	21 April 1992	1.87 m (6 ft 2 in)	71 kg (157 lb)	308 cm (121 in)	295 cm (116 in)	(China) Zhejiang
7	Zheng Yixin	6 May 1995	1.87 m (6 ft 2 in)	69 kg (152 lb)	305 cm (120 in)	300 cm (120 in)	(China) Fujian
8	Wang Na (C)	25 February 1990	1.78 m (5 ft 10 in)	63 kg (139 lb)	305 cm (120 in)	295 cm (116 in)	(China) Zhejiang
9	Zhang Changning	6 November 1995	1.93 m (6 ft 4 in)	80 kg (180 lb)	315 cm (124 in)	303 cm (119 in)	(China) Jiangsu
10	Yao Di	15 August 1992	1.82 m (6 ft 0 in)	65 kg (143 lb)	306 cm (120 in)	298 cm (117 in)	(China) Tianjin
11	Xu Jiujing	13 July 1995	1.89 m (6 ft 2 in)	73 kg (161 lb)	316 cm (124 in)	305 cm (120 in)	(China) Shanghai
12	Song Meili	23 February 1995	1.86 m (6 ft 1 in)	75 kg (165 lb)	310 cm (120 in)	300 cm (120 in)	(China) Shandong
13	Zhang Xiaoya	4 October 1992	1.89 m (6 ft 2 in)	60 kg (130 lb)	310 cm (120 in)	300 cm (120 in)	(China) Sichuan
14	Gong Xiangyu	21 April 1997	1.86 m (6 ft 1 in)	72 kg (159 lb)	313 cm (123 in)	292 cm (115 in)	(China) Jiangsu
15	Wang Yuanyuan	14 July 1997	1.95 m (6 ft 5 in)	75 kg (165 lb)	312 cm (123 in)	300 cm (120 in)	(China) Tianjin
16	Shan Danna	8 October 1991	1.68 m (5 ft 6 in)	60 kg (130 lb)	290 cm (110 in)	285 cm (112 in)	(China) Zhejiang
18	Wang Mengjie	14 November 1995	1.72 m (5 ft 8 in)	65 kg (143 lb)	289 cm (114 in)	280 cm (110 in)	(China) Shandong

== Iran ==
- Head Coach: Majda Cicic

The following is the Iranian roster in the 2016 Asian Cup Championship.

No.	Name	Date of birth	Height	Weight	Spike	Block	2016 club
2	Negin Shirtani	3 March 1998	1.85 m (6 ft 1 in)	80 kg (180 lb)	281 cm (111 in)	271 cm (107 in)	(Iran) Sarmayeh Bank
4	Soudabeh Bagherpour	16 September 1990	1.88 m (6 ft 2 in)	66 kg (146 lb)	281 cm (111 in)	271 cm (107 in)	(Iran) Sarmayeh Bank
6	Shabnam Alikhani	25 September 1992	1.75 m (5 ft 9 in)	65 kg (143 lb)	271 cm (107 in)	261 cm (103 in)	(Iran) Sarmayeh Bank
7	Zeinab Giveh (C)	11 July 1983	1.76 m (5 ft 9 in)	64 kg (141 lb)	265 cm (104 in)	255 cm (100 in)	(Iran) Sarmayeh Bank
8	Mahsa Saberi	14 February 1993	1.78 m (5 ft 10 in)	73 kg (161 lb)	280 cm (110 in)	270 cm (110 in)	(Iran) Sarmayeh Bank
9	Neda Shamlanian	7 March 1994	1.82 m (6 ft 0 in)	72 kg (159 lb)	275 cm (108 in)	265 cm (104 in)	(Iran) Sarmayeh Bank
10	Maedeh Borhani	22 June 1988	1.83 m (6 ft 0 in)	72 kg (159 lb)	287 cm (113 in)	277 cm (109 in)	(Iran) Sarmayeh Bank
11	Mahsa Kadkhoda	22 June 1993	1.82 m (6 ft 0 in)	72 kg (159 lb)	275 cm (108 in)	265 cm (104 in)	(Iran) Sarmayeh Bank
12	Farzaneh Zerei	29 October 1991	1.82 m (6 ft 0 in)	73 kg (161 lb)	273 cm (107 in)	260 cm (100 in)	(Iran) Sarmayeh Bank
13	Negar Kiani	8 June 1992	1.70 m (5 ft 7 in)	60 kg (130 lb)	259 cm (102 in)	249 cm (98 in)	(Iran) Sarmayeh Bank
16	Farnoosh Sheikhi	13 May 1990	1.84 m (6 ft 0 in)	65 kg (143 lb)	285 cm (112 in)	275 cm (108 in)	(Iran) Sarmayeh Bank
17	Shekoufeh Safari	7 March 1989	1.89 m (6 ft 2 in)	81 kg (179 lb)	290 cm (110 in)	280 cm (110 in)	(Iran) Sarmayeh Bank

== Japan ==
- Head Coach: Kiyoshi Abo

The following is the Japanese roster in the 2016 Asian Cup Championship.

No.	Name	Date of birth	Height	Weight	Spike	Block	2016 club
1	Misaki Yamauchi (C)	10 March 1995	1.72 m (5 ft 8 in)	69 kg (152 lb)	306 cm (120 in)	295 cm (116 in)	(Japan) Tokai University
2	Rio Mekada	8 January 1996	1.59 m (5 ft 3 in)	59 kg (130 lb)	250 cm (98 in)	240 cm (94 in)	(Japan) Tokai University
3	Yuka Imamura	2 September 1993	1.76 m (5 ft 9 in)	69 kg (152 lb)	297 cm (117 in)	291 cm (115 in)	(Japan) Hisamitsu Springs
5	Arisa Inoue	8 May 1995	1.80 m (5 ft 11 in)	67 kg (148 lb)	300 cm (120 in)	289 cm (114 in)	(Japan) University of Tsukuba
6	Kasumi Nakaya	8 October 1994	1.77 m (5 ft 10 in)	70 kg (150 lb)	287 cm (113 in)	280 cm (110 in)	(Japan) Nippon Sport S.U
7	Ayaka Sugi	14 February 1996	1.77 m (5 ft 10 in)	72 kg (159 lb)	293 cm (115 in)	282 cm (111 in)	(Japan) Tokyo Women's College
8	Misaki Shirai	30 July 1996	1.75 m (5 ft 9 in)	71 kg (157 lb)	293 cm (115 in)	280 cm (110 in)	(Japan) Toray Arrows
9	Haruka Maruo	15 August 1996	1.75 m (5 ft 9 in)	67 kg (148 lb)	296 cm (117 in)	285 cm (112 in)	(Japan) University of Tsukuba
10	Nanaka Sakamoto	6 September 1996	1.76 m (5 ft 9 in)	65 kg (143 lb)	304 cm (120 in)	294 cm (116 in)	(Japan) Denso Airybees
11	Kyoka Nakayama	26 September 1996	1.76 m (5 ft 9 in)	59 kg (130 lb)	292 cm (115 in)	287 cm (113 in)	(Japan) National I.S.F in Kanoya
13	Moeri Hanai	17 April 1997	1.67 m (5 ft 6 in)	60 kg (130 lb)	275 cm (108 in)	270 cm (110 in)	(Japan) Nippon S.C.U
14	Kasumi Nojima	9 May 1997	1.80 m (5 ft 11 in)	70 kg (150 lb)	294 cm (116 in)	290 cm (110 in)	(Japan) Aoyama Gakuin University
15	Miwako Osanai	29 July 1997	1.74 m (5 ft 9 in)	66 kg (146 lb)	293 cm (115 in)	270 cm (110 in)	(Japan) Hitachi Rivale
18	Tamaki Matsui	10 January 1998	1.70 m (5 ft 7 in)	63 kg (139 lb)	280 cm (110 in)	265 cm (104 in)	Japan W.C.P.E

== Kazakhstan ==
- Head Coach: Shapran Vyacheslav

The following is the Kazakhstani roster in the 2016 Asian Cup Championship.

No.	Name	Date of birth	Height	Weight	Spike	Block	2016 club
1	Tatyana Fendrikova	23 February 1990	1.69 m (5 ft 7 in)	55 kg (121 lb)	280 cm (110 in)	275 cm (108 in)	(Kazakhstan) Almaty
2	Lyudmila Issayeva	26 September 1989	1.84 m (6 ft 0 in)	70 kg (150 lb)	280 cm (110 in)	275 cm (108 in)	(Kazakhstan) Almaty
3	Diana Kavtorina	30 December 1992	1.67 m (5 ft 6 in)	56 kg (123 lb)	270 cm (110 in)	275 cm (108 in)	(Kazakhstan) Irtysh-Kazchrome
4	Yekaterina Zhdanova	28 May 1992	1.83 m (6 ft 0 in)	65 kg (143 lb)	280 cm (110 in)	270 cm (110 in)	(Kazakhstan) Karaganda
9	Irina Lukomskaya	19 March 1991	1.76 m (5 ft 9 in)	66 kg (146 lb)	280 cm (110 in)	270 cm (110 in)	(Kazakhstan) Altay
10	Irina Shenberger	20 February 1992	1.80 m (5 ft 11 in)	73 kg (161 lb)	290 cm (110 in)	280 cm (110 in)	(Kazakhstan) Astana
11	Katerina Tatko	15 December 1992	1.82 m (6 ft 0 in)	70 kg (150 lb)	285 cm (112 in)	275 cm (108 in)	(Kazakhstan) Zhetyssu
12	Evgeniia Ilina	14 August 1991	1.87 m (6 ft 2 in)	78 kg (172 lb)	295 cm (116 in)	285 cm (112 in)	(Kazakhstan) Altay
13	Radmila Beresneva (C)	6 June 1983	1.85 m (6 ft 1 in)	70 kg (150 lb)	300 cm (120 in)	295 cm (116 in)	(Kazakhstan) Irtysh-Kazchrome
14	Antonina Rubtsova	30 December 1984	1.84 m (6 ft 0 in)	67 kg (148 lb)	302 cm (119 in)	275 cm (108 in)	(Kazakhstan) Irtysh-Chrome
16	Alena Popova	21 March 1997	1.82 m (6 ft 0 in)	66 kg (146 lb)	291 cm (115 in)	275 cm (108 in)	(Kazakhstan) Zhetyssu
17	Alla Bogdashkina	22 August 1985	1.85 m (6 ft 1 in)	65 kg (143 lb)	275 cm (108 in)	270 cm (110 in)	(Kazakhstan) Irtysh-Kazchrome
18	Kristina Anikonova	5 January 1991	1.83 m (6 ft 0 in)	73 kg (161 lb)	295 cm (116 in)	285 cm (112 in)	(Kazakhstan) Altay

== South Korea ==
- Head Coach: Kim Cheol-yong

The following is the Korean roster in the 2016 Asian Cup Championship.

No.	Name	Date of birth	Height	Weight	Spike	Block	2016 club
1	Park Se-yun	15 July 1998	1.79 m (5 ft 10 in)	67 kg (148 lb)	290 cm (110 in)	270 cm (110 in)	(South Korea) Joongang Girls' high school
4	Lee Han-bi	28 October 1996	1.77 m (5 ft 10 in)	73 kg (161 lb)	290 cm (110 in)	275 cm (108 in)	(South Korea) Incheon Heungkuk Life Pink Spiders
5	Kim Ju-hyang	27 March 1999	1.82 m (6 ft 0 in)	63 kg (139 lb)	283 cm (111 in)	274 cm (108 in)	(South Korea) Gwangju Physical Education High School
6	Lee Go-eun (C)	9 January 1995	1.70 m (5 ft 7 in)	63 kg (139 lb)	280 cm (110 in)	265 cm (104 in)	(South Korea) Hwaseong IBK Altos
7	Hwang Hyun-jung	31 August 1997	1.85 m (6 ft 1 in)	61 kg (134 lb)	300 cm (120 in)	295 cm (116 in)	(South Korea) Incheon Heungkuk Life Pink Spiders
8	Ha Hyo-rim	16 April 1998	1.71 m (5 ft 7 in)	61 kg (134 lb)	279 cm (110 in)	271 cm (107 in)	(South Korea) Wongok High School
9	Lee Seon-jeong	5 February 1998	1.82 m (6 ft 0 in)	73 kg (161 lb)	290 cm (110 in)	280 cm (110 in)	(South Korea) Sunmyung Girls' High School
11	Lee Young	12 September 1996	1.80 m (5 ft 11 in)	63 kg (139 lb)	310 cm (120 in)	290 cm (110 in)	(South Korea) GS Caltex Seoul KIXX
12	Kim Hyun-jeong	28 August 1998	1.80 m (5 ft 11 in)	76 kg (168 lb)	290 cm (110 in)	270 cm (110 in)	(South Korea) Joongang Girls' high school
13	Jung Ho-young	23 August 2001	1.89 m (6 ft 2 in)	73 kg (161 lb)	300 cm (120 in)	280 cm (110 in)	(South Korea) Gwangju Physical Education Middle School
17	Do Su-been	21 June 1998	1.65 m (5 ft 5 in)	53 kg (117 lb)	270 cm (110 in)	260 cm (100 in)	(South Korea) Daegu Girls' High School
18	Yoo Seo-yeun	12 January 1998	1.74 m (5 ft 9 in)	61 kg (134 lb)	285 cm (112 in)	276 cm (109 in)	(South Korea) Sunmyung Girls' High School

== Chinese Taipei ==
- Head Coach: Lin Ming-hui

The following is the Taiwanese roster in the 2016 Asian Cup Championship.

No.	Name	Date of birth	Height	Weight	Spike	Block	2016 club
1	Lai Xiang-chen	19 March 1995	1.52 m (5 ft 0 in)	50 kg (110 lb)	252 cm (99 in)	245 cm (96 in)	Chinese Taipei
2	Chang Li-wen	27 February 1995	1.75 m (5 ft 9 in)	57 kg (126 lb)	285 cm (112 in)	275 cm (108 in)	Chinese Taipei
5	Chen Yi-ju	21 December 1989	1.73 m (5 ft 8 in)	68 kg (150 lb)	277 cm (109 in)	275 cm (108 in)	Chinese Taipei
6	Hsieh Chian-yi	25 September 1990	1.65 m (5 ft 5 in)	58 kg (128 lb)	280 cm (110 in)	275 cm (108 in)	Chinese Taipei
8	Yang Yi-chen	4 April 1992	1.66 m (5 ft 5 in)	60 kg (130 lb)	262 cm (103 in)	258 cm (102 in)	Chinese Taipei
9	Chang Chen-yin (C)	28 February 1991	1.80 m (5 ft 11 in)	66 kg (146 lb)	288 cm (113 in)	276 cm (109 in)	Chinese Taipei
10	Wu Wei-hua	5 February 1994	1.73 m (5 ft 8 in)	73 kg (161 lb)	278 cm (109 in)	267 cm (105 in)	Chinese Taipei
12	Yang Meng-hua	15 August 1991	1.70 m (5 ft 7 in)	67 kg (148 lb)	270 cm (110 in)	262 cm (103 in)	Chinese Taipei
13	Wen I-tzu	31 October 1991	1.74 m (5 ft 9 in)	71 kg (157 lb)	281 cm (111 in)	273 cm (107 in)	Chinese Taipei
15	Lee Tzu-ying	4 July 1994	1.74 m (5 ft 9 in)	71 kg (157 lb)	274 cm (108 in)	265 cm (104 in)	Chinese Taipei
16	Chen Tzu-ya	26 August 1997	1.78 m (5 ft 10 in)	61 kg (134 lb)	272 cm (107 in)	271 cm (107 in)	Chinese Taipei
19	Tseng Wan-ling	13 May 1996	1.70 m (5 ft 7 in)	66 kg (146 lb)	290 cm (110 in)	277 cm (109 in)	Chinese Taipei

== Thailand ==
- Head Coach: Danai Sriwatcharamethakul

The following is the Thai roster in the 2016 Asian Cup Championship.

No.	Name	Date of birth	Height	Weight	Spike	Block	2016 club
1	Tichaya Boonlert	14 February 1997	1.79 m (5 ft 10 in)	64 kg (141 lb)	291 cm (9 ft 7 in)	283 cm (9 ft 3 in)	(Thailand) 3BB Nakhonnont
2	Piyanut Pannoy	10 November 1989	1.71 m (5 ft 7 in)	68 kg (150 lb)	289 cm (9 ft 6 in)	275 cm (9 ft 0 in)	(Thailand) Supreme
3	Pornpun Guedpard	5 May 1993	1.72 m (5 ft 8 in)	63 kg (139 lb)	294 cm (9 ft 8 in)	290 cm (9 ft 6 in)	(Thailand) Bangkok Glass
4	Thatdao Nuekjang	3 February 1994	1.83 m (6 ft 0 in)	66 kg (146 lb)	306 cm (10 ft 0 in)	287 cm (9 ft 5 in)	(Thailand) Idea Khonkaen
5	Pleumjit Thinkaow (C)	9 November 1983	1.80 m (5 ft 11 in)	63 kg (139 lb)	302 cm (9 ft 11 in)	293 cm (9 ft 7 in)	(Thailand) Bangkok Glass
7	Hattaya Bamrungsuk	12 August 1993	1.80 m (5 ft 11 in)	70 kg (150 lb)	300 cm (9 ft 10 in)	282 cm (9 ft 3 in)	(Thailand) Nakhon Ratchasima
8	Yupa Sanitklang	14 August 1991	1.66 m (5 ft 5 in)	60 kg (130 lb)	275 cm (9 ft 0 in)	260 cm (8 ft 6 in)	(Thailand) Nakhon Ratchasima
9	Jarasporn Bundasak	1 March 1993	1.80 m (5 ft 11 in)	66 kg (146 lb)	295 cm (9 ft 8 in)	290 cm (9 ft 6 in)	(Thailand) Bangkok Glass
10	Wilavan Apinyapong	6 June 1984	1.74 m (5 ft 9 in)	68 kg (150 lb)	294 cm (9 ft 8 in)	282 cm (9 ft 3 in)	(Thailand) Supreme
12	Pimpichaya Kokram	16 June 1998	1.77 m (5 ft 10 in)	57 kg (126 lb)	300 cm (9 ft 10 in)	289 cm (9 ft 6 in)	(Thailand) 3BB Nakhonnont
15	Malika Kanthong	8 January 1987	1.77 m (5 ft 10 in)	63 kg (139 lb)	310 cm (10 ft 2 in)	290 cm (9 ft 6 in)	(Azerbaijan) Azeryol Baku
18	Ajcharaporn Kongyot	18 June 1995	1.78 m (5 ft 10 in)	66 kg (146 lb)	295 cm (9 ft 8 in)	285 cm (9 ft 4 in)	(Thailand) Supreme
19	Chatchu-on Moksri	6 November 1999	1.79 m (5 ft 10 in)	63 kg (139 lb)	302 cm (9 ft 11 in)	293 cm (9 ft 7 in)	(Thailand) Nakhon Ratchasima
20	Soraya Phomla	6 August 1992	1.69 m (5 ft 7 in)	60 kg (130 lb)	280 cm (9 ft 2 in)	270 cm (8 ft 10 in)	(Thailand) Supreme

== Vietnam ==
- Head Coach: Thái Thanh Tùng

The following is the Vietnamese roster in the 2016 Asian Cup Championship.

No.	Name	Date of birth	Height	Weight	Spike	Block	2016 club
1	Đoàn Thị Xuân	17 May 1997	1.84 m (6 ft 0 in)	60 kg (130 lb)	295 cm (116 in)	285 cm (112 in)	(Vietnam) Vietinbank
3	Trần Thị Thanh Thúy	12 December 1997	1.93 m (6 ft 4 in)	63 kg (139 lb)	315 cm (124 in)	290 cm (110 in)	(Vietnam) VTV Binh Dien
5	Phạm Thị Kim Huệ	3 August 1982	1.81 m (5 ft 11 in)	70 kg (150 lb)	312 cm (123 in)	315 cm (124 in)	(Vietnam) Vietinbank
7	Hà Ngọc Diễm	22 December 1994	1.77 m (5 ft 10 in)	60 kg (130 lb)	310 cm (120 in)	300 cm (120 in)	(Vietnam) Vinh Long
8	Nguyễn Thị Kim Liên	10 February 1993	1.58 m (5 ft 2 in)	53 kg (117 lb)	220 cm (87 in)	200 cm (79 in)	(Vietnam) VTV Binh Dien
9	Nguyễn Thị Ngọc Hoa (C)	10 November 1987	1.83 m (6 ft 0 in)	64 kg (141 lb)	315 cm (124 in)	305 cm (120 in)	(Vietnam) VTV Binh Dien
10	Bùi Vũ Thanh Tuyền	30 May 1991	1.65 m (5 ft 5 in)	58 kg (128 lb)	270 cm (110 in)	265 cm (104 in)	(Vietnam) Vietinbank
11	Nguyễn Thị Hồng Đào	24 July 1994	1.74 m (5 ft 9 in)	65 kg (143 lb)	290 cm (110 in)	275 cm (108 in)	(Vietnam) VTV Binh Dien
13	Nguyễn Linh Chi	31 July 1990	1.73 m (5 ft 8 in)	58 kg (128 lb)	286 cm (113 in)	280 cm (110 in)	(Vietnam) Lien Viet Postbank
15	Nguyễn Thị Trinh	5 September 1997	1.81 m (5 ft 11 in)	61 kg (134 lb)	298 cm (117 in)	290 cm (110 in)	(Vietnam) VTV Binh Dien
16	Đinh Thị Thúy	12 April 1998	1.75 m (5 ft 9 in)	67 kg (148 lb)	298 cm (117 in)	290 cm (110 in)	(Vietnam) Vietinbank
17	Lê Thanh Thúy	23 May 1995	1.80 m (5 ft 11 in)	62 kg (137 lb)	298 cm (117 in)	293 cm (115 in)	(Vietnam) Vietinbank
