= 2017 Asian Women's Club Volleyball Championship squads =

This article shows the rosters of all participating teams at the 2017 Asian Women's Club Volleyball Championship in Ust-Kamenogorsk, Kazakhstan.

== Pool A ==
=== Altay ===
The following is the roster of the Kazakhstani club Altay in the 2017 Asian Club Championship.

Head coach: (Russia) Yaroslav Antonov

No.	Name	Date of birth	Height	Weight	Spike	Block
1	(Kazakhstan) Olga Karpova	10 June 1980	1.83 m (6 ft 0 in)	75 kg (165 lb)	300 cm (120 in)	295 cm (116 in)
2	(Kazakhstan) Sana Anarkulova	21 July 1989	1.88 m (6 ft 2 in)	71 kg (157 lb)	310 cm (120 in)	300 cm (120 in)
4	(Kazakhstan) Aliya Sadykova	1 August 1988	1.72 m (5 ft 8 in)	60 kg (130 lb)	280 cm (110 in)	270 cm (110 in)
7	(Kazakhstan) Inna German	17 January 1983	1.85 m (6 ft 1 in)	75 kg (165 lb)	300 cm (120 in)	290 cm (110 in)
8	(Kazakhstan) Korinna Ishimtseva	8 February 1984	1.84 m (6 ft 0 in)	70 kg (150 lb)	300 cm (120 in)	290 cm (110 in)
9	(Kazakhstan) Lyudmila Issayeva	26 September 1989	1.86 m (6 ft 1 in)	75 kg (165 lb)	305 cm (120 in)	300 cm (120 in)
10	(Kazakhstan) Valeriya Rylova	22 November 1987	1.76 m (5 ft 9 in)	75 kg (165 lb)	280 cm (110 in)	270 cm (110 in)
11	(Kazakhstan) Tatyana Pyurova	5 April 1982	1.83 m (6 ft 0 in)	75 kg (165 lb)	300 cm (120 in)	290 cm (110 in)
12	(Kazakhstan) Ainagul Aizharikhova	4 September 1994	1.85 m (6 ft 1 in)	65 kg (143 lb)	290 cm (110 in)	280 cm (110 in)
13	(Serbia) Bojana Radulovic	1 January 1984	1.75 m (5 ft 9 in)	82 kg (181 lb)	300 cm (120 in)	280 cm (110 in)
14	(Serbia) Jovana Brakocevic	5 March 1988	1.96 m (6 ft 5 in)	65 kg (143 lb)	315 cm (124 in)	310 cm (120 in)
16	(Kazakhstan) Inna Matveyeva (C)	12 October 1978	1.88 m (6 ft 2 in)	80 kg (180 lb)	310 cm (120 in)	300 cm (120 in)
18	(Kazakhstan) Kristina Anikonova	5 January 1991	1.84 m (6 ft 0 in)	72 kg (159 lb)	290 cm (110 in)	280 cm (110 in)
19	(Cuba) Yunieska Batista	21 March 1993	1.85 m (6 ft 1 in)	78 kg (172 lb)	310 cm (120 in)	305 cm (120 in)

=== Supreme Chonburi ===
The following is the roster of the Thai club Supreme Chonburi in the 2017 Asian Club Championship.

Head coach: (Thailand) Nataphon Srisamutnak

No.	Name	Date of birth	Height	Weight	Spike	Block
1	(Thailand) Supattra Pairoj	27 June 1990	1.60 m (5 ft 3 in)	58 kg (128 lb)	275 cm (108 in)	265 cm (104 in)
2	(Thailand) Piyanut Pannoy	10 November 1989	1.71 m (5 ft 7 in)	62 kg (137 lb)	280 cm (110 in)	275 cm (108 in)
5	(Thailand) Pleumjit Thinkaow	9 November 1983	1.80 m (5 ft 11 in)	64 kg (141 lb)	303 cm (119 in)	293 cm (115 in)
7	(Thailand) Patcharaporn Sittisad	27 February 1996	1.65 m (5 ft 5 in)	55 kg (121 lb)	278 cm (109 in)	267 cm (105 in)
9	(Thailand) Chatchu-on Moksri	6 November 1999	1.78 m (5 ft 10 in)	63 kg (139 lb)	298 cm (117 in)	290 cm (110 in)
10	(Thailand) Wilavan Apinyapong (C)	6 June 1984	1.74 m (5 ft 9 in)	67 kg (148 lb)	294 cm (116 in)	280 cm (110 in)
11	(Thailand) Nampueng Khamart	26 March 1989	1.70 m (5 ft 7 in)	65 kg (143 lb)	275 cm (108 in)	268 cm (106 in)
12	(Thailand) Soraya Phomla	6 August 1992	1.69 m (5 ft 7 in)	60 kg (130 lb)	280 cm (110 in)	270 cm (110 in)
15	(United States) Chloe Mann	12 November 1990	1.86 m (6 ft 1 in)	75 kg (165 lb)	308 cm (121 in)	286 cm (113 in)
16	(Thailand) Parinya Pankaew	27 December 1995	1.70 m (5 ft 7 in)	63 kg (139 lb)	281 cm (111 in)	269 cm (106 in)
17	(Thailand) Watchareeya Nuanjam	22 July 1996	1.78 m (5 ft 10 in)	64 kg (141 lb)	292 cm (115 in)	279 cm (110 in)
18	(Thailand) Ajcharaporn Kongyot	18 June 1995	1.80 m (5 ft 11 in)	65 kg (143 lb)	298 cm (117 in)	287 cm (113 in)
19	(Senegal) Fatou Diouck	19 June 1985	1.83 m (6 ft 0 in)	70 kg (150 lb)	306 cm (120 in)	287 cm (113 in)
20	(Thailand) Rattanakorn Sanuanram	9 April 1980	1.80 m (5 ft 11 in)	66 kg (146 lb)	295 cm (116 in)	284 cm (112 in)

=== Sarmayeh Bank ===
The following is the roster of the Iranian club Sarmayeh Bank Tehran in the 2017 Asian Club Championship.

Head coach: (Iran) Mitra Shabanian

No.	Name	Date of birth	Height	Weight	Spike	Block
1	(Iran) Mahdieh Kajehkolaei	13 September 1988	1.78 m (5 ft 10 in)	72 kg (159 lb)	277 cm (109 in)	267 cm (105 in)
2	(Iran) Faranak Babolian	17 April 1992	1.78 m (5 ft 10 in)	69 kg (152 lb)	278 cm (109 in)	265 cm (104 in)
4	(Iran) Soudabeh Bagherpour	16 September 1990	1.88 m (6 ft 2 in)	66 kg (146 lb)	281 cm (111 in)	271 cm (107 in)
5	(Iran) Neda Chamlanian	7 March 1994	1.82 m (6 ft 0 in)	72 kg (159 lb)	275 cm (108 in)	265 cm (104 in)
6	(Iran) Shabnam Alikhani (C)	25 September 1992	1.75 m (5 ft 9 in)	60 kg (130 lb)	271 cm (107 in)	261 cm (103 in)
7	(Iran) Zeinab Giveh	11 July 1983	1.76 m (5 ft 9 in)	64 kg (141 lb)	265 cm (104 in)	255 cm (100 in)
8	(Iran) Mahsa Saberi	14 February 1993	1.78 m (5 ft 10 in)	73 kg (161 lb)	280 cm (110 in)	270 cm (110 in)
10	(Iran) Maedeh Borhani	22 June 1988	1.83 m (6 ft 0 in)	72 kg (159 lb)	287 cm (113 in)	277 cm (109 in)
12	(Iran) Niloufar Ebrahimi	23 November 1991	1.84 m (6 ft 0 in)	70 kg (150 lb)	295 cm (116 in)	290 cm (110 in)
14	(Iran) Tahmine Dargazani	26 March 1991	1.90 m (6 ft 3 in)	71 kg (157 lb)	286 cm (113 in)	276 cm (109 in)
16	(Iran) Farnoosh Sheikhi	3 May 1990	1.84 m (6 ft 0 in)	65 kg (143 lb)	285 cm (112 in)	275 cm (108 in)
17	(Iran) Niloufar Hojati	9 February 1991	1.68 m (5 ft 6 in)	60 kg (130 lb)	220 cm (87 in)	210 cm (83 in)
18	(Iran) Mahta Mohamadi	13 April 1990	1.70 m (5 ft 7 in)	60 kg (130 lb)	250 cm (98 in)	240 cm (94 in)
19	(Iran) Mahtab Rahmani	25 August 1992	1.84 m (6 ft 0 in)	67 kg (148 lb)	310 cm (120 in)	290 cm (110 in)

=== Taiwan Power ===
The following is the roster of the Taiwanese club Taiwan Power in the 2017 Asian Club Championship.

Head coach: (Chinese Taipei) Yao Cheng-shan

No.	Name	Date of birth	Height	Weight	Spike	Block
3	(Chinese Taipei) Tseng Wan-ling	13 May 1996	1.71 m (5 ft 7 in)	65 kg (143 lb)	290 cm (110 in)	277 cm (109 in)
5	(Chinese Taipei) Kuo Ching-yi	17 February 1996	1.67 m (5 ft 6 in)	60 kg (130 lb)	280 cm (110 in)	275 cm (108 in)
6	(Chinese Taipei) Hsieh Yi-chen	25 September 1990	1.65 m (5 ft 5 in)	65 kg (143 lb)	280 cm (110 in)	275 cm (108 in)
7	(Chinese Taipei) Huang Chen-yu	25 February 1998	1.79 m (5 ft 10 in)	62 kg (137 lb)	289 cm (114 in)	279 cm (110 in)
7	(Chinese Taipei) Chang Li-yun (C)	28 March 1991	1.80 m (5 ft 11 in)	68 kg (150 lb)	288 cm (113 in)	276 cm (109 in)
11	(Chinese Taipei) Lai Chia-yin	17 November 1991	1.74 m (5 ft 9 in)	64 kg (141 lb)	275 cm (108 in)	265 cm (104 in)
12	(Chinese Taipei) Yang Meng-hua	15 August 1991	1.70 m (5 ft 7 in)	69 kg (152 lb)	270 cm (110 in)	262 cm (103 in)
13	(Chinese Taipei) Wen I-tzu	31 October 1991	1.76 m (5 ft 9 in)	67 kg (148 lb)	281 cm (111 in)	273 cm (107 in)
15	(Chinese Taipei) Lee Tzu-ying	4 July 1994	1.74 m (5 ft 9 in)	71 kg (157 lb)	274 cm (108 in)	265 cm (104 in)
16	(Chinese Taipei) Huang Ching-hsuan	16 November 1998	1.80 m (5 ft 11 in)	63 kg (139 lb)	284 cm (112 in)	282 cm (111 in)
17	(Chinese Taipei) Chang Yu-chia	27 January 1996	1.72 m (5 ft 8 in)	75 kg (165 lb)	275 cm (108 in)	265 cm (104 in)

== Pool B ==
=== Hisamitsu Springs ===
The following is the roster of the Japanese club Hisamitsu Springs in the 2017 Asian Club Championship.

Head coach: (Japan) Shingo Sakai

No.	Name	Date of birth	Height	Weight	Spike	Block
1	(Japan) Ayano Nakaoji	23 July 1991	1.67 m (5 ft 6 in)	61 kg (134 lb)	290 cm (110 in)	275 cm (108 in)
7	(Japan) Risa Ishibashi (C)	3 February 1990	1.78 m (5 ft 10 in)	65 kg (143 lb)	292 cm (115 in)	284 cm (112 in)
9	(Japan) Hitomi Kodama	26 September 1996	1.79 m (5 ft 10 in)	66 kg (146 lb)	284 cm (112 in)	277 cm (109 in)
10	(Japan) Haruka Kanamori	9 April 1996	1.76 m (5 ft 9 in)	66 kg (146 lb)	297 cm (117 in)	290 cm (110 in)
11	(Japan) Erika Sakae	3 April 1991	1.68 m (5 ft 6 in)	53 kg (117 lb)	273 cm (107 in)	267 cm (105 in)
12	(Japan) Yuka Imamura	2 September 1993	1.75 m (5 ft 9 in)	69 kg (152 lb)	295 cm (116 in)	290 cm (110 in)
13	(Japan) Kiyora Obikawa	31 May 1993	1.83 m (6 ft 0 in)	70 kg (150 lb)	298 cm (117 in)	290 cm (110 in)
14	(Japan) Fumika Moriya	7 April 1992	1.80 m (5 ft 11 in)	75 kg (165 lb)	302 cm (119 in)	285 cm (112 in)
15	(Japan) Yuka Taura	28 June 1998	1.63 m (5 ft 4 in)	63 kg (139 lb)	287 cm (113 in)	270 cm (110 in)
16	(Japan) Asuka Hamamatsu	22 December 1998	1.82 m (6 ft 0 in)	67 kg (148 lb)	304 cm (120 in)	302 cm (119 in)
17	(Japan) Hikari Kato	26 August 1997	1.79 m (5 ft 10 in)	74 kg (163 lb)	297 cm (117 in)	282 cm (111 in)
18	(Japan) Mana Toe	18 May 1994	1.63 m (5 ft 4 in)	60 kg (130 lb)	278 cm (109 in)	264 cm (104 in)
19	(Japan) Akane Ukishima	10 June 1996	1.72 m (5 ft 8 in)	66 kg (146 lb)	286 cm (113 in)	275 cm (108 in)
20	(Japan) Sayaka Tsutsui	29 September 1992	1.58 m (5 ft 2 in)	51 kg (112 lb)	260 cm (100 in)	248 cm (98 in)

=== Tianjin Bohai Bank ===
The following is the roster of the Chinese club Tianjin Bohai Bank in the 2017 Asian Club Championship.

Head coach: (China) Wang Bao-quan

No.	Name	Date of birth	Height	Weight	Spike	Block
2	(China) Yang Linlin	18 May 1996	1.91 m (6 ft 3 in)	70 kg (150 lb)	302 cm (119 in)	297 cm (117 in)
4	(China) Wang Jiamin	11 February 1995	1.86 m (6 ft 1 in)	75 kg (165 lb)	309 cm (122 in)	302 cm (119 in)
5	(China) Yu Junwei	4 July 1994	1.88 m (6 ft 2 in)	72 kg (159 lb)	308 cm (121 in)	300 cm (120 in)
6	(China) Wang Ning	14 May 1994	1.89 m (6 ft 2 in)	60 kg (130 lb)	312 cm (123 in)	303 cm (119 in)
7	(China) Yin Na	3 February 1988	1.82 m (6 ft 0 in)	65 kg (143 lb)	313 cm (123 in)	300 cm (120 in)
9	(China) Wang Qian	14 March 1989	1.74 m (5 ft 9 in)	65 kg (143 lb)	305 cm (120 in)	300 cm (120 in)
10	(China) Liu Liwen	2 August 1994	1.72 m (5 ft 8 in)	67 kg (148 lb)	289 cm (114 in)	284 cm (112 in)
12	(China) Zhang Xiaoting	21 January 1989	1.85 m (6 ft 1 in)	69 kg (152 lb)	300 cm (120 in)	295 cm (116 in)
14	(China) Chen Liyi (C)	27 April 1989	1.84 m (6 ft 0 in)	75 kg (165 lb)	302 cm (119 in)	290 cm (110 in)
16	(China) Yao Di	15 August 1992	1.82 m (6 ft 0 in)	65 kg (143 lb)	306 cm (120 in)	298 cm (117 in)
18	(China) Li Ying	29 November 1988	1.79 m (5 ft 10 in)	71 kg (157 lb)	306 cm (120 in)	298 cm (117 in)

=== Vietinbank VC ===
The following is the roster of the Vietnamese club Vietinbank in the 2017 Asian Club Championship.

Head coach: (Vietnam) Lê Văn Dũng

No.	Name	Date of birth	Height	Weight	Spike	Block
1	(Vietnam) Doan Thi Xuan	17 May 1997	1.82 m (6 ft 0 in)	62 kg (137 lb)	305 cm (120 in)	300 cm (120 in)
4	(Vietnam) Dinh Thi Huyen	31 July 1987	1.68 m (5 ft 6 in)	58 kg (128 lb)	290 cm (110 in)	285 cm (112 in)
5	(Vietnam) Pham Thi Kim Hue	8 March 1982	1.80 m (5 ft 11 in)	69 kg (152 lb)	297 cm (117 in)	293 cm (115 in)
6	(Vietnam) Tran Thi Loan	1 January 1988	1.70 m (5 ft 7 in)	60 kg (130 lb)	292 cm (115 in)	287 cm (113 in)
8	(Vietnam) Le Thanh Thuy	23 May 1995	1.80 m (5 ft 11 in)	62 kg (137 lb)	298 cm (117 in)	295 cm (116 in)
9	(Vietnam) Hoang Minh Tam	9 January 1991	1.73 m (5 ft 8 in)	62 kg (137 lb)	293 cm (115 in)	287 cm (113 in)
10	(Vietnam) Bui Vu Thanh Tuyen	30 May 1991	1.65 m (5 ft 5 in)	64 kg (141 lb)	283 cm (111 in)	273 cm (107 in)
11	(Vietnam) Nguyen Thi Xuan (C)	9 October 1986	1.80 m (5 ft 11 in)	69 kg (152 lb)	295 cm (116 in)	290 cm (110 in)
12	(Vietnam) Nguyen Thi Thu Hoa	15 February 1987	1.80 m (5 ft 11 in)	65 kg (143 lb)	298 cm (117 in)	293 cm (115 in)
15	(Vietnam) Pham Thi Tham	29 July 1990	1.71 m (5 ft 7 in)	64 kg (141 lb)	290 cm (110 in)	285 cm (112 in)
16	(Vietnam) Dinh Thi Thuy	16 April 1998	1.75 m (5 ft 9 in)	64 kg (141 lb)	298 cm (117 in)	293 cm (115 in)
20	(Vietnam) Nguyen Thu Hoai	16 September 1998	1.72 m (5 ft 8 in)	58 kg (128 lb)	280 cm (110 in)	276 cm (109 in)

=== Rebisco-PSL ===
The following is the roster of the Filipino club Rebisco-PSL in the 2017 Asian Club Championship.

Head coach: (Philippines) Francis Vicente

No.	Name	Date of birth	Height	Weight	Spike	Block
1	(Philippines) Kim Fajardo	30 September 1993	1.70 m (5 ft 7 in)	64 kg (141 lb)	272 cm (107 in)	267 cm (105 in)
2	(Philippines) Jaja Santiago	20 January 1996	1.96 m (6 ft 5 in)	65 kg (143 lb)	280 cm (110 in)	277 cm (109 in)
3	(Philippines) Mika Reyes	21 June 1994	1.81 m (5 ft 11 in)	61 kg (134 lb)	283 cm (111 in)	279 cm (110 in)
6	(Philippines) Jovelyn Gonzaga	31 October 1991	1.70 m (5 ft 7 in)	62 kg (137 lb)	273 cm (107 in)	274 cm (108 in)
7	(Philippines) Geneveve Casugod	12 January 1991	1.85 m (6 ft 1 in)	75 kg (165 lb)	275 cm (108 in)	268 cm (106 in)
8	(Philippines) Aiza Maizo-Pontillas	29 February 1988	1.75 m (5 ft 9 in)	69 kg (152 lb)	280 cm (110 in)	275 cm (108 in)
10	(Philippines) Maika Ortiz	30 August 1991	1.78 m (5 ft 10 in)	73 kg (161 lb)	290 cm (110 in)	295 cm (116 in)
11	(Philippines) Rhea Dimaculangan	21 March 1991	1.70 m (5 ft 7 in)	63 kg (139 lb)	266 cm (105 in)	256 cm (101 in)
12	(Philippines) Bia General	27 August 1995	1.65 m (5 ft 5 in)	60 kg (132 lb)	258 cm (102 in)	252 cm (99 in)
13	(Philippines) Rachel Daquis (C)	13 December 1987	1.74 m (5 ft 9 in)	56 kg (123 lb)	277 cm (109 in)	268 cm (106 in)
14	(Philippines) Denden Lazaro	21 January 1992	1.65 m (5 ft 5 in)	56 kg (123 lb)	251 cm (99 in)	247 cm (97 in)
16	(Philippines) Aby Maraño	22 December 1992	1.75 m (5 ft 9 in)	54 kg (119 lb)	280 cm (110 in)	270 cm (110 in)
18	(Philippines) Frances Molina	24 September 1994	1.75 m (5 ft 9 in)	61 kg (134 lb)	280 cm (110 in)	275 cm (108 in)
19	(Philippines) Maria Lourdes Clemente	5 December 1994	1.85 m (6 ft 1 in)	60 kg (130 lb)	287 cm (113 in)	280 cm (110 in)
