= 2010 AVC Cup for Women squads =

This article shows the women's squads of the participating teams at the 2010 Asian Women's Cup Volleyball Championship.

== China ==
No.	Name	Date of birth	Position	Club
-	Yu Juemin		coach	
1	Wang Yimei	11 January 1988		(China) Liaoning Volleyball
2	Zhang Lei	11 January 1985		(China) Shanghai Volleyball
4	Shen Jingsi	3 May 1989	setter	(China) Bayi Volleyball
7	Zhang Xian	16 March 1985	libero	(China) Yunnan Volleyball
8	Wei Qiuyue	26 September 1988	setter	(China) Tianjin Volleyball
10	Li Juan	15 May 1981	outside hitter	(China) Tianjin Volleyball
11	Xu Yunli	2 August 1987	middle blocker	(China) Fujian Volleyball
12	Xue Ming	23 February 1987	middle blocker	(China) Beijing Volleyball
14	Chen Liyi	27 April 1989	outside hitter	(China) Tianjin Volleyball
15	Ma Yunwen	19 October 1986	outside hitter	(China) Shanghai Volleyball
16	Bian Yuqian	14 June 1990	setter	(China) Shanghai Volleyball
18	Fan Linlin	1 December 1991	outside hitter	(China) Bayi Volleyball

== South Korea ==
No.	Name	Date of birth	Position	Club
-	Park Sam-Ryong	7 June 1968	coach	(South Korea) KT&G
3	Han Soo-Ji	1 February 1989	setter	(South Korea) KT&G
4	Kim Sa-Nee	21 June 1981	setter	(South Korea) Incheon Heungkuk Life Pink Spiders
5	La Hea-Won	28 June 1986	outside hitter	(South Korea) GS Caltex Seoul KIXX
7	Kim Min-Ji	25 May 1985	outside hitter	(South Korea) GS Caltex Seoul KIXX
8	Nam Jie-Youn	25 May 1983	libero	(South Korea) GS Caltex Seoul KIXX
9	Yim Myung-Ok	5 May 1986	libero	(South Korea) KT&G
10	Kim Yeon-Koung	26 February 1988	outside hitter	(Japan) JT Marvelous
11	Han Yoo-Mi	5 February 1982	outside hitter	(South Korea) Suwon Hyundai Engineering & Construction Hillstate
12	Han Song-Yi	5 September 1984	outside hitter	(South Korea) Incheon Heungkuk Life Pink Spiders
15	Kim Se-Young	4 June 1981	middle blocker	(South Korea) KT&G
17	Yang Hyo-Jin	14 December 1989	middle blocker	(South Korea) Suwon Hyundai Engineering & Construction Hillstate
19	Kim Hee-Jin	29 April 1991	outside hitter	(South Korea) Joongang Women's high school

== Japan ==
No.	Name	Date of birth	Position	Club
-	Kiyoshi Abo		coach	
1	Yoshiko Yano	1 August 1985	middle blocker	(Japan) Denso Airybees
2	Asuka Minamoto	17 February 1988	outside hitter	(Japan) University of Tsukuba
3	Akari Oumi	10 November 1989	outside hitter	(Japan) Tokai University
4	Miya Sato	23 October 1986	outside hitter	(Japan) Toray Arrows
5	Mai Fukuda	30 January 1984	outside hitter	(Japan) Okayama Seagulls
6	Haruka Miyashita	1 September 1994	setter	(Japan) Okayama Seagulls
7	Miyu Nagaoka	25 July 1991	outside hitter	(Japan) Higashi Kyushu Ryukoku
8	Yuki Ishikawa	26 April 1987	middle blocker	(Japan) JT Marvelous
9	Nana Iwasaka	3 July 1990	middle blocker	(Japan) Hisamitsu Springs
10	Mai Okumura	31 October 1990	middle blocker	(Japan) Kaetsu University
11	Kotoe Inoue	15 February 1990	libero	(Japan) JT Marvelous
12	Ai Inden	3 April 1987	outside hitter	(Japan) JT Marvelous

== Iran ==
No.	Name	Date of birth	Position	Club
-	Sima Sedighi		coach	
1	Mahdieh Khajeh			
2	Fatemeh Shaban			
4	Masoomeh Angooti			
5	Maryam Kamyabi			
7	Fatemeh Rashidi			
8	Mahta Mohammadi			
9	Pauran Zare			
10	Parida Hokam		libero	
11	Bahareh Niazi			
12	Zeinab Giveh			
14	Farnoosh Sheikhi			
18	Maedeh Borhani			

== Kazakhstan ==
No.	Name	Date of birth	Position	Club
-	Nelli Chsherbakova		coach	
1	Natalya Zhukova	29 March 1980	middle blocker	
2	Tatyana Pyurova	6 April 1982	outside hitter	(Kazakhstan) Zhetyssu
3	Sana Jarlagassova	21 July 1989	outside hitter	(Kazakhstan) Almaty
5	Olga Nassedkina	28 December 1982	middle blocker	(Kazakhstan) Zhetyssu
6	Olessya Arslanova	12 December 1981	middle blocker	(Kazakhstan) Zhetyssu
8	Korinna Ishimtseva	8 February 1984	setter	(Kazakhstan) Zhetyssu
9	Irina Lukomskaya	19 March 1991	setter	(Kazakhstan) Almaty
10	Yelena Ezau	9 March 1983	libero	(Kazakhstan) Irtysh-Kazchrome
11	Marina Storozhenko	6 June 1985	libero	(Kazakhstan) Zhetyssu
13	Yuliya Kutsko	18 April 1980	outside hitter	(Israel) Neve Sha'anan
16	Inna Matveyeva	12 October 1978	outside hitter	(Russia) VK Samorodok
17	Olga Drobyshevskaya	22 September 1985	outside hitter	(Kazakhstan) Zhetyssu

== Chinese Taipei ==
No.	Name	Date of birth	Position	Club
-	Norimasa Sakakuchi		coach	
1	Yen Min Teng	9 February 1984	outside hitter	(Chinese Taipei) TPEC
2	Yin Feng Tsai	6 November 1984	middle blocker	(Chinese Taipei) Taiwan Power
3	Wan Ting Chen	25 November 1990		(Chinese Taipei) NTNU
4	Wan Ju Liao	19 April 1984		
5	Ko Jou Wu	17 November 1985	outside hitter	(Chinese Taipei) Taiwan Power
6	Pei Ling Yen	5 January 1986	setter	(Chinese Taipei) Taiwan Power
7	Yi Ting Hsieh	7 October 1987	libero	(Chinese Taipei) Taiwan Power
9	Szu Chi Huang	31 March 1988	middle blocker	(Chinese Taipei) NTNU
10	Shu Fen Wu	7 April 1989	middle blocker	(Chinese Taipei) Taiwan Power
11	Ya Chu Yang	8 July 1991	setter	(Chinese Taipei) NTNU
12	Meng Hua Yang	15 August 1991	libero	(Chinese Taipei) NCUE
13	I Tzu Wen	31 October 1991	middle blocker	(Chinese Taipei) Hsin Min

== Thailand ==
No.	Name	Date of birth	Position	Club
-	Kiattipong Radchatagriengkai	17 July 1966	coach	(Thailand) Federbrau
1	Piyanut Pannoy	10 November 1989	libero	(Thailand) Federbrau
3	Rasamee Supamool	12 August 1993	outside hitter	(Thailand) Federbrau
5	Pleumjit Thinkaow	9 November 1983	middle blocker	(Thailand) Federbrau
6	Onuma Sittirak	13 June 1986	outside hitter	(Thailand) Federbrau
8	Utaiwan Kaensing	7 September 1988	middle blocker	(Thailand) Federbrau
10	Wilavan Apinyapong	6 June 1984	outside hitter	(Thailand) Federbrau
11	Amporn Hyapha	19 May 1985	middle blocker	(Thailand) Federbrau
12	Kamonporn Sukmak	29 February 1988	setter	(Thailand) Federbrau
13	Nootsara Tomkom	7 July 1985	setter	(Thailand) Federbrau
15	Malika Kanthong	8 January 1987	outside hitter	(Thailand) Federbrau
18	Em-orn Phanusit	25 March 1988	outside hitter	(Thailand) Federbrau
19	Tapaphaipun Chaisri	29 November 1989	libero	(Thailand) Federbrau

== Vietnam ==
No.	Name	Date of birth	Position	Club
-	Dat Tong Phat		coach	
1	Huong Dinh Thi			
2	Nham Le Thi Minh			
3	Hoa Ha Thi			
4	Hoa Nguyen Thi Thu			
5	Xoan Do Thi			
7	Mai Lai Thi			
8	Minh Do Thi			
10	Tuyet Le Thi Ngoc			
11	Xuan Nguyen Thi			
14	Hue Biu Thi			
15	Lien Nguyen Thi Kim		libero	
