= Risa Ishii =

Japanese volleyball player (born 1990)

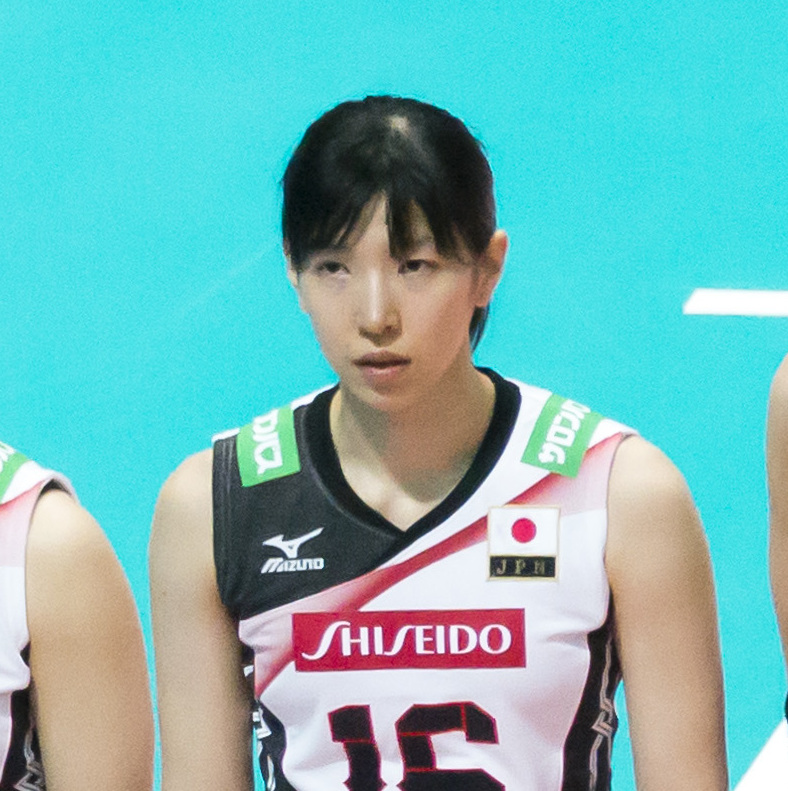

Personal information
- Full name: Risa Ishii
- Nickname: Risa
- Born: May 19, 1990 (age 36); Tsuru, Yamanashi, Japan
- Height: 1.79 m (5 ft 10 in)
- Weight: 66 kg (146 lb)
- Spike: 305 cm (120 in)
- Block: 287 cm (113 in)

Volleyball information
- Position: Wing Spiker
- Current club: officially retired
- Number: 16

National team
Japan 2012-

Risa Ishii (石井 里沙, Ishii Risa; born May 19, 1990) is a Japanese volleyball player who played for Denso Airybees. She plays as number 16 when she plays for the All-Japan women's volleyball team.

== Life ==
Ishii played for the All-Japan team for the first time at the 2012 Asian Women's Cup Volleyball Championship in September 2012.

== Clubs ==
- (Japan) Hachiōji Jissen Junior High
- (Japan) Hachiōji Jissen Highschool
- (Japan) Denso Airybees (2009-2018)

== Awards ==
=== Clubs ===
- 2010 - Empress's Cup - Champion, with Denso airybees

=== National team ===
- 2017 Asian Women's Volleyball Championship - Champion
