= Chen Wan-ching =

Taiwanese volleyball player (born 1988)

Chen Wan Ching

Personal information
- Nationality: Chinese Taipei
- Born: 16 June 1988 (age 38)
- Height: 167 cm (66 in)
- Weight: 56 kg (123 lb)
- Spike: 289 cm (114 in)
- Block: 282 cm (111 in)

Volleyball information
- Number: 11 (national team)

National team
2012	Chinese Taipei

Chen Wan Ching (born 16 June 1988) is a Taiwanese female volleyball player. She was part of the Chinese Taipei women's national volleyball team.

She participated in the 2007 FIVB Volleyball World Grand Prix.
