= Sontaya Keawbundit =

Thai volleyball player (born 1991)

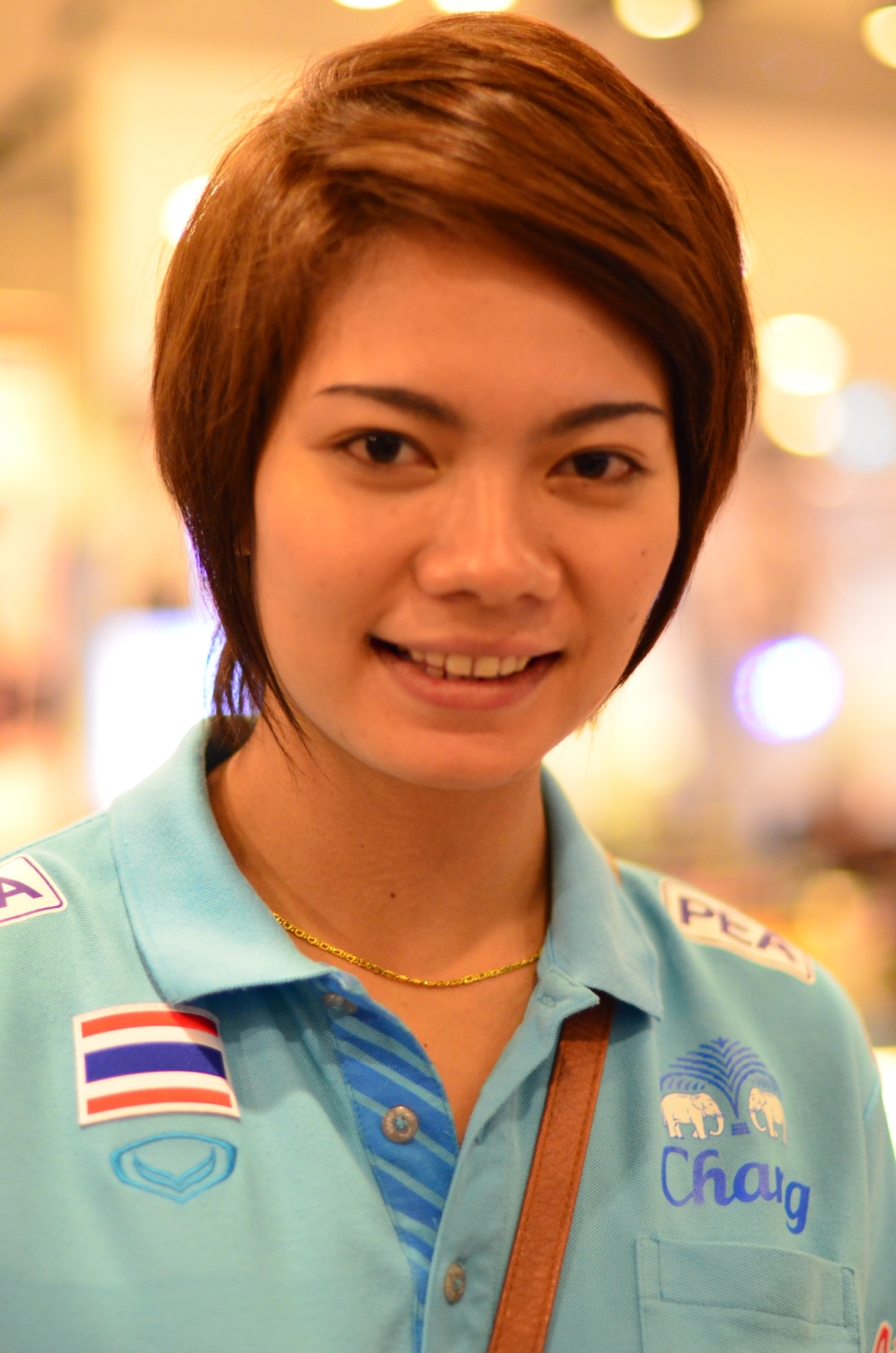

Personal information
- Nationality: Thai
- Born: September 2, 1991 (age 35); Roi Et, Thailand
- Height: 1.77 m (5 ft 10 in)
- Weight: 65 kg (143 lb)

Volleyball information
- Position: Outside hitter
- Current club: Bangkok
- Number: 7

National team
2009–2013	Thailand
Honours
Women's volleyball
Representing Thailand
Summer Universiade
Bronze medal – third place	2013 Kazan	Team
Asian Cup Championship
Gold medal – first place	2012 Almaty	Team

Sontaya Keawbundit (Thai: สนธยา แก้วบัณฑิต; RTGS: Sonthaya Kaeobandit) is a Thai volleyball player and a member of the Thailand national team.

== Clubs ==
- (Thailand) Idea Khonkaen (2009–2013)
- (Thailand) Chang (2011–2012)
- (Philippines) RC Cola Raiders (2013–2014)
- (Thailand) King-Bangkok (2015–2016)
- (Thailand) Khonkaen Star (2016–2017)
- (Thailand) Bangkok (2018–)

== Awards ==
=== Clubs ===
- 2012 Asian Club Championship – Bronze medal, with Chang
- 2012–13 Thailand League - Champion, with Idea Khonkaen

== National team ==
=== Senior team ===
- 2010 Asian Cup - Silver Medal
