= Soudabeh Bagherpour =

Iranian volleyball player (born 1990)

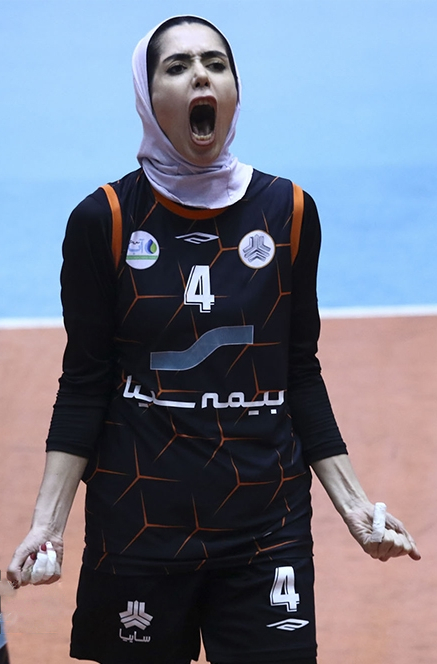
- Iranian women volleyball league 2019. First week of the second round

Personal information
- Full name: Soudabeh Bagherpour
- Nationality: Iranian
- Born: 16 September 1990 (age 36); Babol, Iran
- Height: 1.85 m (6 ft 1 in)
- Weight: 70 kg (154 lb)
- Spike: 2.96 m (117 in)
- Block: 2.88 m (113 in)

Volleyball information
- Position: Middleblocker
- Current club: (Iran) Paykan Tehran

National team
Iran women's national volleyball team

Soudabeh Bagherpour (Persian: سودابه باقرپور, born 16 September 1990 in Babol) is an Iranian volleyball player who plays for the Iran women's national volleyball team.

She won the title of the best defender on the tour in the World Cup qualifiers in Central Asia along with Farnoosh Sheikhi in 2018. She is ranked 226 in the world for 2023 and 5700 in world for all time. She played for the teams of Senrik Gonbad, Peykan Tehran, Saipa Tehran, and Gen-I Volley. She is also the runner-up in the Iranian Premier League.
