= Piyanut Pannoy =

Thai volleyball player (born 1989)

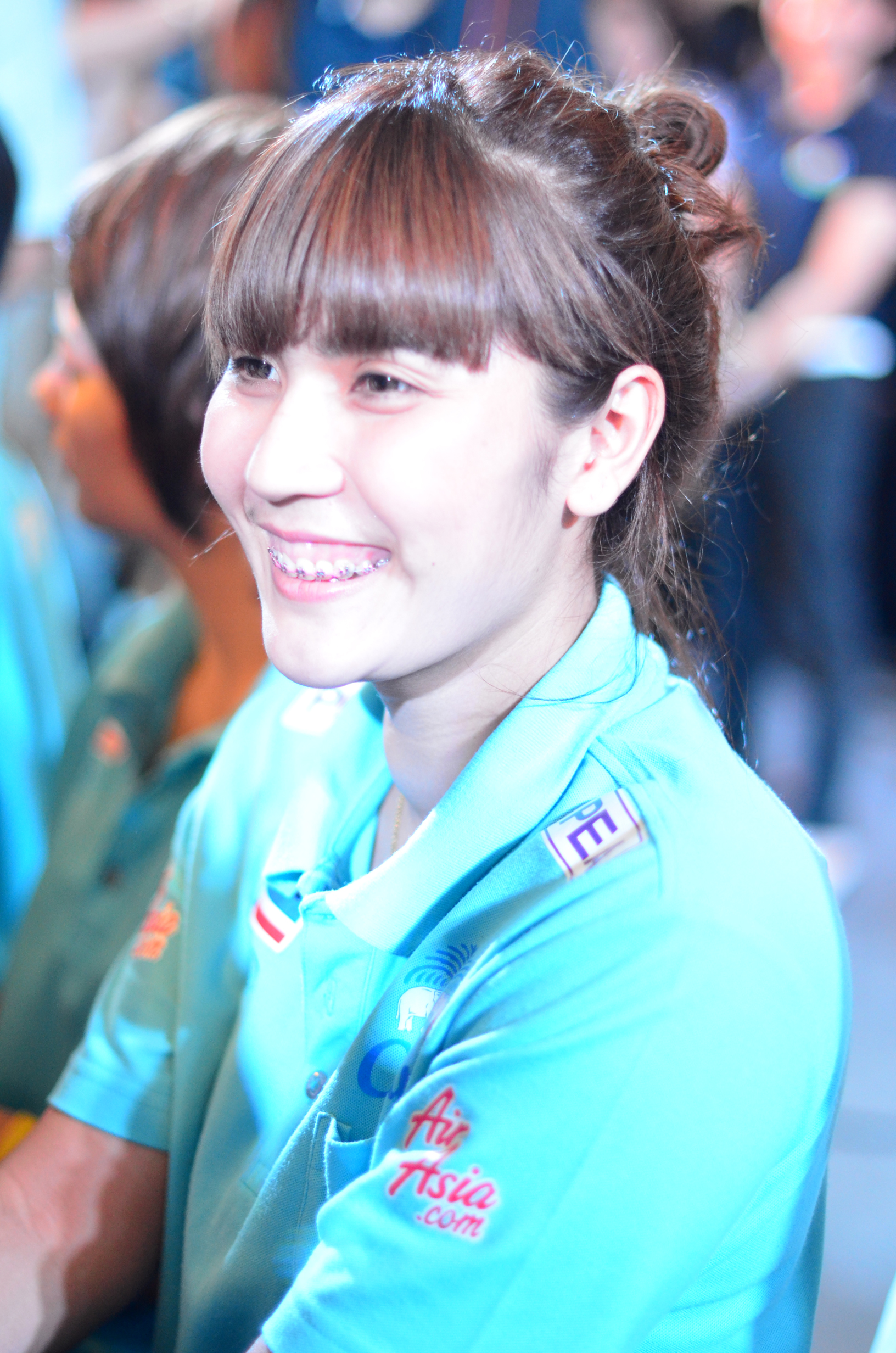

Personal information
- Full name: Piyanut Pannoy
- Nickname: Paen
- Nationality: Thai
- Born: 10 November 1989 (age 36); Nakhon Si Thammarat, Thailand
- Height: 171 cm (5 ft 7 in)
- Weight: 63 kg (139 lb)
- Spike: 280 cm (110 in)
- Block: 274 cm (108 in)
- Education: Rattana Bundit University

Volleyball information
- Position: Libero
- Current club: (United States) LOVB Atlanta
- Number: 2

National team
2010 –	Thailand
Honours
Women's volleyball
Representing Thailand
Montreux Volley Masters
Silver medal – second place	2016 Switzerland	Team
Asian Games
Silver medal – second place	2018 Jakarta/Palembang	Team
Bronze medal – third place	2014 Incheon	Team
Bronze medal – third place	2022 Hangzhou	Team
Bronze medal – third place	2026 Aichi/Nagoya	Team
Asian Championship
Gold medal – first place	2013 Nakhon Ratchasima	Team
Gold medal – first place	2023 Nakhon Ratchasima	Team
Gold medal – first place	2026 Tianjin	Team
Silver medal – second place	2017 Biñan	Team
Silver medal – second place	2019 Seoul	Team
Bronze medal – third place	2015 Tianjin	Team
Asian Cup
Gold medal – first place	2012 Almaty	Team
Silver medal – second place	2010 Taicang	Team
Bronze medal – third place	2016 Vĩnh Phúc	Team
Bronze medal – third place	2018 Nakhon Ratchasima	Team
Southeast Asian Games
Gold medal – first place	2011 Jakarta/Palembang	Team
Gold medal – first place	2013 Naypyidaw	Team
Gold medal – first place	2015 Singapore	Team
Gold medal – first place	2017 Kuala Lumpur	Team
Gold medal – first place	2019 Philippines	Team
Gold medal – first place	2025 Thailand	Team
ASEAN Grand Prix
Gold medal – first place	2019 Nakhon Ratchasima	Team
Summer Universiade
Bronze medal – third place	2013 Kazan	Team

Piyanut Pannoy (Thai: ปิยะนุช แป้นน้อย; RTGS: Piyanut Paennoi, born November 10, 1989) is a Thai volleyball player who plays as a Libero for the Thailand women's national volleyball team

== Career ==
She is on the list 2019 Korea-Thailand all star super match competition.

== Clubs ==
- (Thailand) Bangkok (2008–2009)
- (Thailand) Chaiyaphum (2009–2010)
- (Thailand) Supreme Nakhonsi (2010–2012)
- (Thailand) Supreme Chonburi (2012–2017)
- (Kazakhstan) Altay Oskemen (2017–2018)
- (Thailand) Supreme Chonburi (2018–2023)
- (Azerbaijan) Azerrail Baku (2011–2012, 2023-2024)
- (United States) LOVB Atlanta (2024-)

== Awards ==
=== Individuals ===
- 2010 Asian Games – "Best Receiver"
- 2011 Asian Club Championship – "Best Libero"
- 2013 Summer Universiade – "Best Digger"
- 2014 China International – "Best Libero"
- 2016 Thai-Denmark Super League – "Best Libero"
- 2016 Montreux Volley Masters – "Best Libero"
- 2016 Asian Cup – "Best Libero"
- 2019 Asian Championship – "Best Libero"

=== Clubs ===
- 2008–09 Thailand League – Champion, with Bangkok
- 2015–16 Thailand League – Runner-up, with Supreme Chonburi
- 2016–17 Thailand League – Champion, with Supreme Chonburi
- 2017 Thai-Denmark Super League – Champion, with Supreme Chonburi
- 2018 Thai-Denmark Super League – Champion, with Supreme Chonburi
- 2011–12 Azerbaijan Super League – Runner-up, with Azerrail Baku
- 2017–18 Kazakhstan Liga – Champion, with Altay
- 2010 Asian Club Championship – Champion, with Federbrau
- 2011 Asian Club Championship – Champion, with Chang
- 2012 Asian Club Championship – Bronze medal, with Chang
- 2017 Asian Club Championship – Champion, with Supreme Chonburi
- 2018 Asian Club Championship – Champion, with Supreme Chonburi
- 2019 Asian Club Championship – Runner-up, with Supreme Chonburi

== Royal decorations ==
- 2013 – Commander (Third Class) of The Most Exalted Order of the White Elephant
- 2020 – Commander (Third Class) of The Most Admirable Order of the Direkgunabhorn
