= Tatyana Pyurova =

Kazakhstani volleyball player (born 1983)

Personal information
- Nationality: Kazakhstani
- Born: 5 April 1983 (age 43); Tashkent, Uzbek SSR, Soviet Union
- Height: 1.82 m (6 ft 0 in)
- Weight: 67 kg (148 lb)
- Spike: 305 cm (120 in)
- Block: 295 cm (116 in)

Volleyball information
- Number: 2

Career
Years	Teams
2008	(Kazakhstan) Zhetyssu

National team
2008	Kazakhstan

Tatyana Pyurova or Tatiana Piurowa (Татьяна Александровна Пюрова, born 5 April 1983) was a retired Kazakhstani female volleyball player. She was part of the Kazakhstan women's national volleyball team.

She competed with the national team at the 2008 Summer Olympics in Beijing, China. She played with Zhetyssu in 2008.

== Clubs ==
- (Kazakhstan) Zhetyssu (2008)

== See also ==
- Kazakhstan at the 2008 Summer Olympics
