= Chen Wan-ting =

Taiwanese volleyball player (born 1990)

Chen Wan Ting

Personal information
- Nationality: Chinese Taipei
- Born: 25 November 1990 (age 35)
- Height: 178 cm (70 in)
- Weight: 67 kg (148 lb)
- Spike: 290 cm (114 in)
- Block: 280 cm (110 in)

Volleyball information
- Number: 10 (national team)

National team
2012	Chinese Taipei

Chen Wan Ting (born 25 November 1990) is a Taiwanese female volleyball player. She was part of the Chinese Taipei women's national volleyball team.

She participated in the 2010 FIVB Volleyball World Grand Prix, and in the 2012 FIVB Volleyball World Grand Prix.
