= Farzaneh Zarei =

Iranian volleyball player (born 1991)

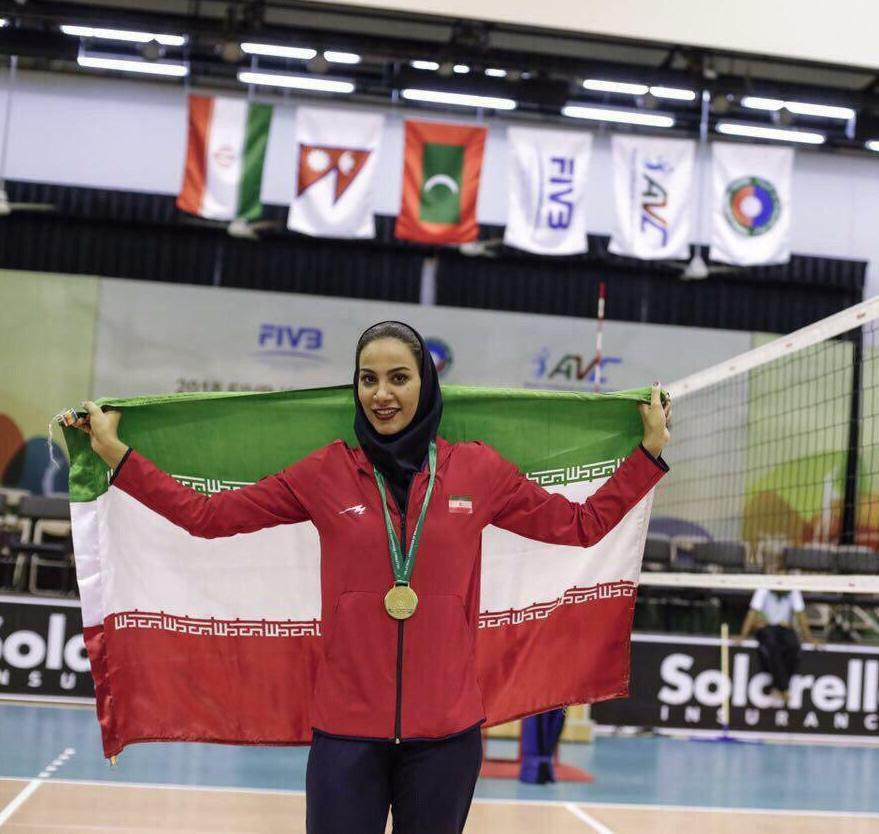

Personal information
- Full name: Farzaneh Zarei
- Nationality: Iranian
- Born: 29 October 1991 (age 35); Isfahan, Iran
- Height: 1.82 m (6 ft 0 in)
- Weight: 63 kg (139 lb)
- Spike: 2.73 m (107 in)
- Block: 2.64 m (104 in)

Volleyball information
- Position: Outside hitter
- Current club: (Iran) Zob Ahan Isfahan

National team
Iran women's national volleyball team

Farzaneh Zarei (Persian: فرزانه زارعی, born 29 october 1991 in Isfahan) is an Iranian volleyball player who plays for the Iran women's national volleyball team.

She has played for Bank Sarmayeh and Zob Ahan Isfahan and is currently a player for Zob ahan Esfahan. With this team, she has a history of winning the Iranian Premier League in his sports record.

Zarei has been a member of the national team since 2009 and at the age of 17 he was the youngest member of the team. She finished runner-up with the national team at the Szeles Peter International Tournament in Hungary. She plays in the position of receiving power.
