= Radmila Beresneva =

Kazakhstani volleyball player (born 1983)

Personal information
- Nationality: Kazakhstan
- Born: 6 June 1983 (age 43)
- Height: 1.85 m (6 ft 1 in)
- Weight: 70 kg (150 lb)
- Spike: 300 cm (120 in)
- Block: 295 cm (116 in)

Volleyball information
- Number: 13

Career
Years	Teams
2014	(Kazakhstan) Irtysh Kazchrome

Radmila Beresneva (born 6 June 1983) is a Kazakh volleyball player. She is a member of the Kazakhstan women's national volleyball team and played for Irtysh Kazchrome in 2014.

She was part of the Kazakhstani national team at the 2014 FIVB Volleyball Women's World Championship in Italy. She participated in the 2016 FIVB Volleyball World Grand Prix.

== Clubs ==
- (Kazakhstan) Irtysh Kazchrome (2014)
