= Yu Juemin =

Chinese volleyball player (born 1960)

Personal information
- Nationality: Chinese
- Born: 1 May 1960 (age 65)

Sport
- Sport: Volleyball

Yu Juemin (simplified Chinese: 俞觉敏; traditional Chinese: 俞覺敏; pinyin: Yú Juémǐn; born 1 May 1960) is a Chinese volleyball player. He competed in the men's tournament at the 1984 Summer Olympics.
