= Chang Chen-yin =

Taiwanese volleyball player (born 1991)

Chang Chen Yin

Personal information
- Nationality: Chinese Taipei
- Born: 28 March 1991 (age 35)
- Height: 180 cm (71 in)
- Weight: 67 kg (148 lb)
- Spike: 292 cm (115 in)
- Block: 280 cm (110 in)

Volleyball information
- Number: 15 (national team)

National team
2007-2014	Chinese Taipei

Chang Chen-Yin (born 28 March 1991) is a Taiwanese retired female volleyball player. She was part of the Chinese Taipei women's national volleyball team.

She participated in the 2007 FIVB Volleyball World Grand Prix. She competed at the 2014 Asian Games.
