= Mahsa Kadkhoda =

Iranian volleyball player (born 1993)

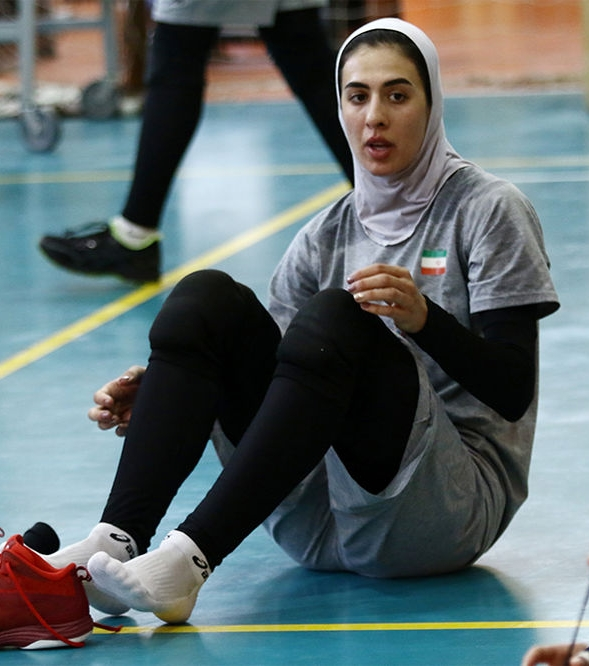
- Kadkhoda playing for Iran national team

Personal information
- Full name: Mahsa Kadkhoda
- Nationality: Iranian
- Born: 22 June 1993 (age 33); Birjand, Iran
- Height: 1.79 m (5 ft 10 in)
- Weight: 71 kg (157 lb)
- Spike: 2.90 m (114 in)
- Block: 2.90 m (114 in)

Volleyball information
- Position: Outside hitter
- Current club: (Iran) Paykan Tehran

National team
Iran women's national volleyball team
Honours
Women's volleyball
Representing Iran
Islamic Solidarity Games
Silver medal – second place	2021 Konya	Team

Mahsa Kadkhoda (Persian: مهسا کدخدا; born 22 June 1993 in Birjand) is an Iranian volleyball player who plays for the Iran women's national volleyball team. She has played for Bank Sarmayeh and Peykan Tehran and is also a runner-up in the Iranian Premier League. She is the first player from South Khorasan to play in the national women's volleyball team. Kadkhoda is a graduate of Physical Education and Master of Physiology who became a member of the national team in 2007 and was sent to world competitions in 2010 as the captain of the Iranian national youth team. Together with Persepolis Club, she has won the third place in the Asian Volleyball Championship. She was runner-up with the national team of the Hungarian international tournament Szeles Peter and Mahsa Kadkhoda was selected as the best spiker of the tournament.
