= 2012 Asian Women's Volleyball Cup =

International indoor volleyball tournament

Tournament details
- Host country: Kazakhstan
- City: Almaty
- Dates: 10–16 September
- Teams: 8 (from 1 confederation)
- Venue: 1 (in 1 host city)

Final positions
- Champions: Thailand (1st title)
- Runners-up: China
- Third place: Kazakhstan
- Fourth place: Vietnam

Tournament awards
- MVP: (Thailand) Onuma Sittirak

The 2012 Asian Women's Volleyball Cup, so-called 2012 AVC Cup for Women was the third edition of the Asian Cup, a biennial international volleyball tournament organised by the Asian Volleyball Confederation (AVC) with Kazakhstan Volleyball Federation (KVF). The tournament was held in Baluan Sholak Palace of Culture and Sports, Almaty, Kazakhstan from 10 to 16 September 2021.

== Pools composition ==
The teams are seeded based on their final ranking at the 2011 Asian Women's Volleyball Championship.

Pool A	Pool B
Kazakhstan (Host); South Korea (3rd); Chinese Taipei; Thailand	China (1st); Japan (2nd); Vietnam; Iran

== Preliminary round ==
=== Pool A ===
Pos	Team	Pld	W	L	Pts	SW	SL	SR	SPW	SPL	SPR	Qualification
1	Thailand	3	3	0	9	9	1	9.000	248	213	1.164	Quarterfinals
2	Kazakhstan	3	2	1	6	7	4	1.750	257	238	1.080	Quarterfinals
3	South Korea	3	1	2	2	4	8	0.500	262	275	0.953	Quarterfinals
4	Chinese Taipei	3	0	3	1	2	9	0.222	219	260	0.842	Quarterfinals

Date	Time		Score		Set 1	Set 2	Set 3	Set 4	Set 5	Total	Report
10 Sep	13:00	South Korea	0–3	Thailand	23–25	23–25	20–25			66–75	P2 P3
10 Sep	17:30	Kazakhstan	3–0	Chinese Taipei	25–20	25–17	25–17			75–54	P2 P3
11 Sep	13:00	Thailand	3–0	Chinese Taipei	25–15	25–22	25–19			75–56	75–56
11 Sep	15:00	South Korea	1–3	Kazakhstan	18–25	25–16	22–25	21–25		86–91	P2 P3
12 Sep	11:00	Chinese Taipei	2–3	South Korea	25–20	22–25	25–22	21–25	16–18	109–110	P2 P3
12 Sep	17:30	Kazakhstan	1–3	Thailand	25–23	22–25	23–25	21–25		91–98	P2 P3

=== Pool B ===
Pos	Team	Pld	W	L	Pts	SW	SL	SR	SPW	SPL	SPR	Qualification
1	China	3	3	0	9	9	0	MAX	225	143	1.573	Quarterfinals
2	Vietnam	3	2	1	5	6	6	1.000	256	248	1.032	Quarterfinals
3	Japan	3	1	2	4	5	6	0.833	230	238	0.966	Quarterfinals
4	Iran	3	0	3	0	1	9	0.111	167	249	0.671	Quarterfinals

Date	Time		Score		Set 1	Set 2	Set 3	Set 4	Set 5	Total	Report
10 Sep	11:00	Vietnam	3–1	Iran	25–11	25–18	24–26	25–17		99–72	P2 P3
10 Sep	15:00	China	3–0	Japan	25–18	25–17	25–19			75–54	P2 P3
11 Sep	11:00	Iran	0–3	Japan	17–25	22–25	20–25			59–75	P2 P3
11 Sep	17:30	Vietnam	0–3	China	12–25	18–25	23–25			53–75	P2 P3
12 Sep	13:00	Japan	2–3	Vietnam	25–20	23–25	25–17	13–25	15–17	101–104	P2 P3
12 Sep	15:00	China	3–0	Iran	25–16	25–10	25–10			75–36	P2 P3

== Final round ==
Quarterfinals
14 September – Almaty
Thailand	3
Iran	0
14 September – Almaty
Vietnam	3
South Korea	2
14 September – Almaty
China	3
Chinese Taipei	0
14 September – Almaty
Kazakhstan	3
Japan	1

Semifinals
15 September – Almaty
Thailand	3
Vietnam	0
15 September – Almaty
China	3
Kazakhstan	0

Final
16 September – Almaty
Thailand	3
China	1
3rd place
16 September – Almaty
Vietnam	0
Kazakhstan	3

5th–8th places
15 September – Almaty
Chinese Taipei	0
Japan	3
15 September – Almaty
Iran	0
South Korea	3

5th place
16 September – Almaty
Japan	3
South Korea	0
7th place
16 September – Almaty
Chinese Taipei	3
Iran	0

=== Quarterfinals ===
Date	Time		Score		Set 1	Set 2	Set 3	Set 4	Set 5	Total	Report
14 Sep	13:00	Thailand	3–0	Iran	25–19	25–18	25–16			75–53	P2 P3
14 Sep	15:00	China	3–0	Chinese Taipei	25–20	25–8	27–25			77–53	P2 P3
14 Sep	17:30	Kazakhstan	3–1	Japan	25–21	25–21	19–25	25–20		94–87	P2 P3
14 Sep	19:30	Vietnam	3–2	South Korea	17–25	25–23	14–25	25–22	15–11	96–106	P2 P3

=== 5th–8th semifinals ===
Date	Time		Score		Set 1	Set 2	Set 3	Set 4	Set 5	Total	Report
15 Sep	11:00	Chinese Taipei	0–3	Japan	17–25	15–25	17–25			49–75	P2 P3
15 Sep	13:00	Iran	0–3	South Korea	16–25	20–25	20–25			56–75	P2 P3

=== Semifinals ===
Date	Time		Score		Set 1	Set 2	Set 3	Set 4	Set 5	Total	Report
15 Sep	15:00	Thailand	3–0	Vietnam	25–22	26–24	25–17			76–63	P2 P3
15 Sep	17:30	China	3–0	Kazakhstan	25–20	25–14	25–11			75–45	P2 P3

=== 7th place ===
Date	Time		Score		Set 1	Set 2	Set 3	Set 4	Set 5	Total	Report
16 Sep	11:00	Chinese Taipei	3–0	Iran	25–21	25–20	25–15			75–56	P2 P3

=== 5th place ===
Date	Time		Score		Set 1	Set 2	Set 3	Set 4	Set 5	Total	Report
16 Sep	13:00	Japan	3–0	South Korea	25–18	25–17	25–11			75–46	P2 P3

=== 3rd place ===
Date	Time		Score		Set 1	Set 2	Set 3	Set 4	Set 5	Total	Report
16 Sep	15:00	Vietnam	0–3	Kazakhstan	18–25	20–25	16–25			54–75	P2 P3

=== Final ===
Date	Time		Score		Set 1	Set 2	Set 3	Set 4	Set 5	Total	Report
16 Sep	17:30	Thailand	3–1	China	30–28	25–27	25–21	25–20		105–96	P2 P3

== Final standing ==
Rank	Team
1st place, gold medalist(s)	Thailand
2nd place, silver medalist(s)	China
3rd place, bronze medalist(s)	Kazakhstan
4	Vietnam
5	Japan
6	South Korea
7	Chinese Taipei
8	Iran

Qualified for the 2013 World Grand Prix

2012 Asian Women's Cup champions

Thailand
1st title

Team Roster

Wanna Buakaew, Piyanut Pannoy, Pleumjit Thinkaow, Onuma Sittirak, Wilavan Apinyapong, Amporn Hyapha, Tapaphaipun Chaisri, Nootsara Tomkom, Malika Kanthong, Pornpun Guedpard, Ajcharaporn Kongyot, Sontaya keawbundit

Head Coach: Kiattipong Radchatagriengkai

== Awards ==
- MVP: (Thailand) Onuma Sittirak
- Best scorer: (Thailand) Onuma Sittirak
- Best spiker: (Thailand) Onuma Sittirak
- Best blocker: (China) Xu Yunli
- Best server: (China) Hui Ruoqi
- Best setter: (Thailand) Nootsara Tomkom
- Best libero: (Kazakhstan) Marina Storozhenko

== Gallery ==
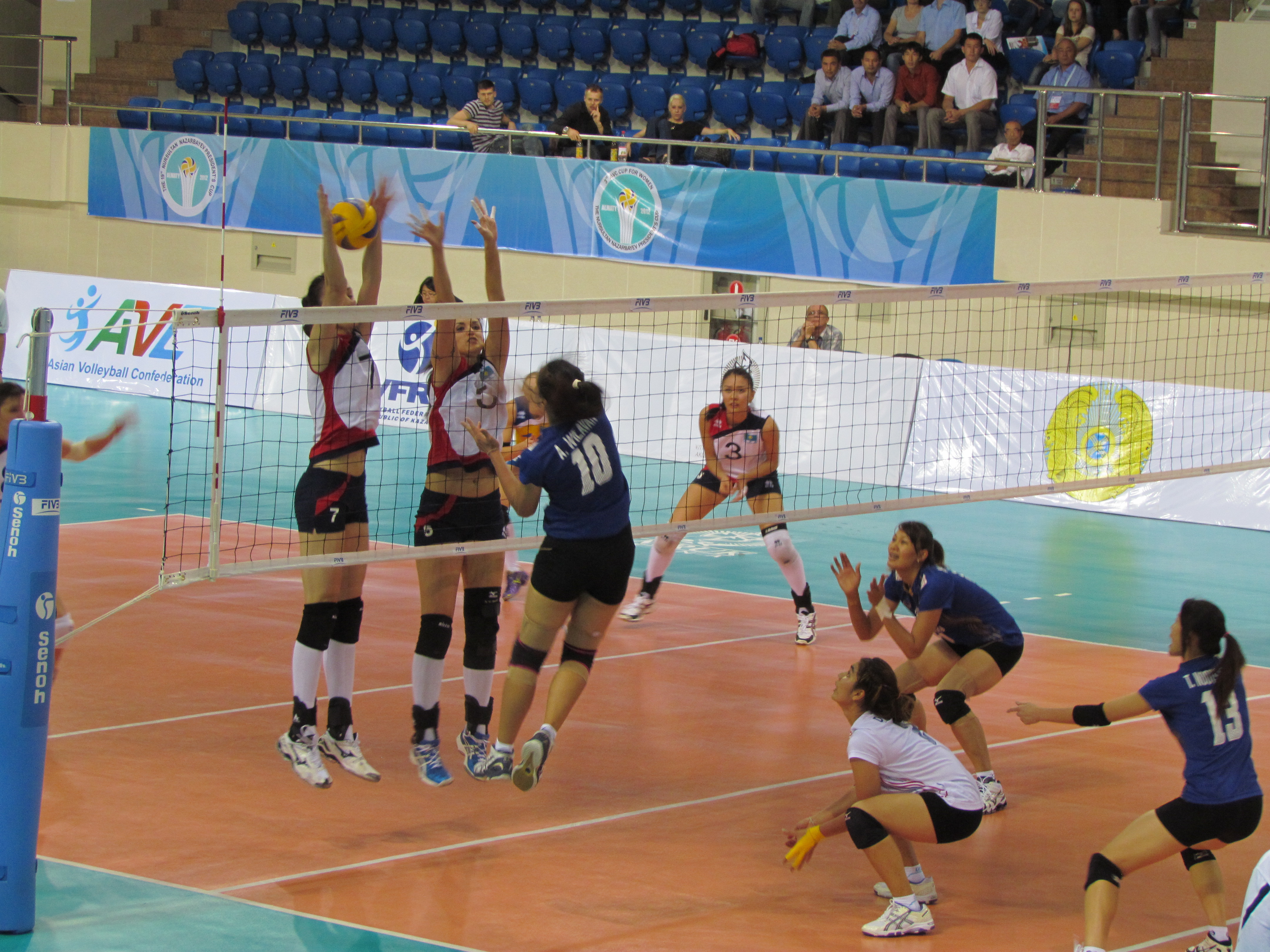
Kazakhstan – Thailand

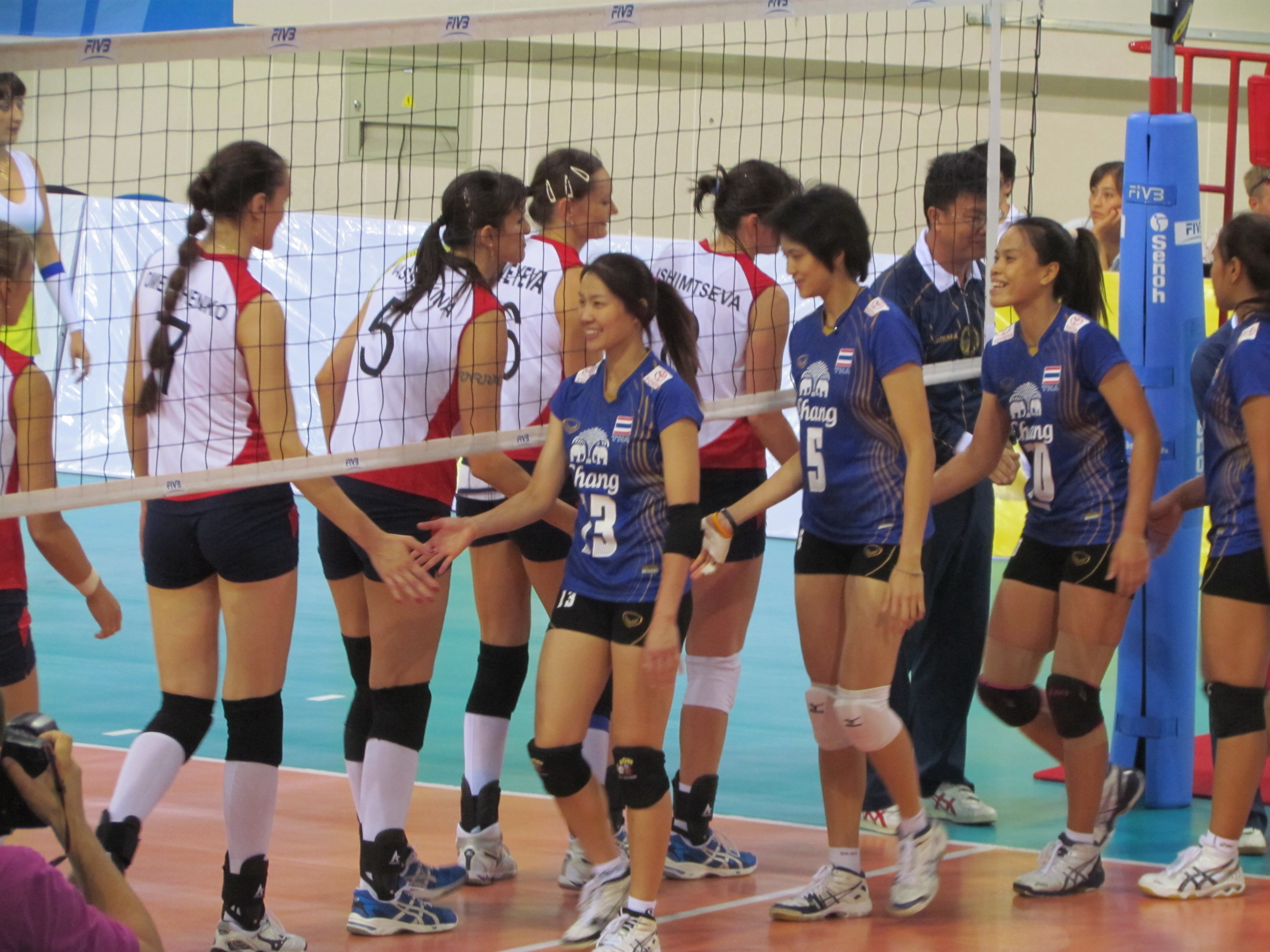
Kazakhstan – Thailand

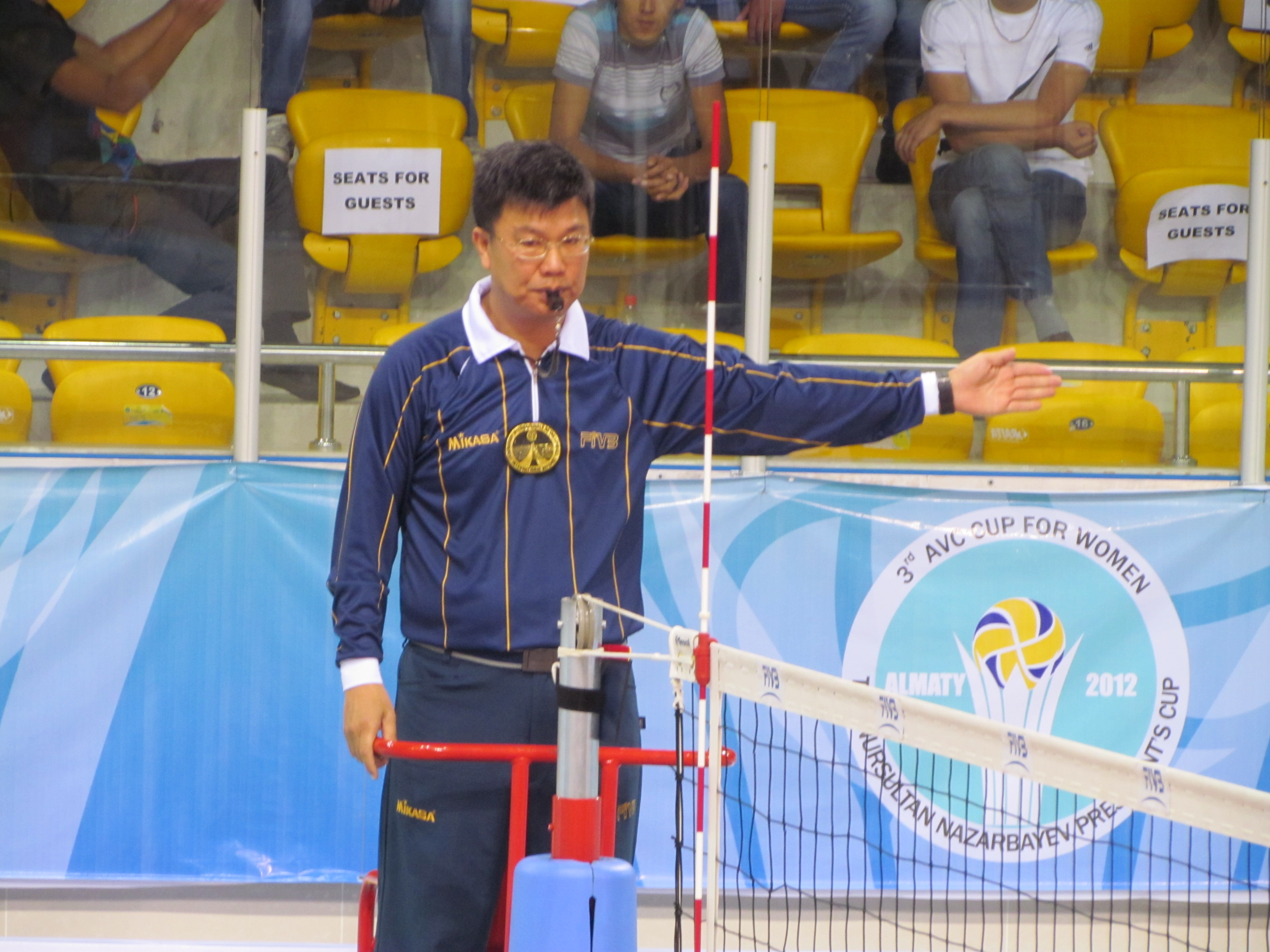
Judge from Chinese Taipei C. L. Chun

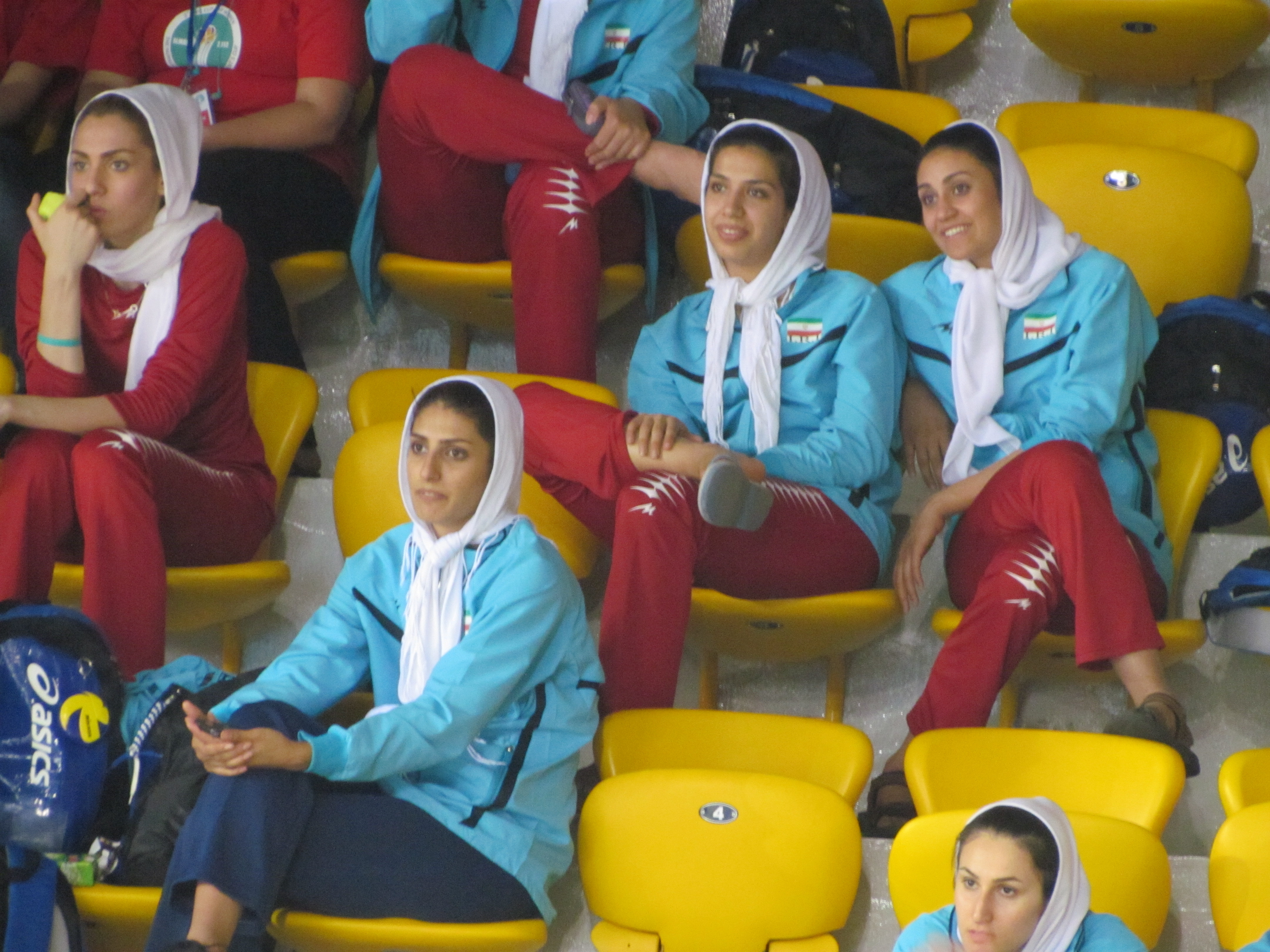
Iranian volleyball players

== See also ==
- 2012 Asian Men's Volleyball Cup
