= Shekoufeh Safari =

Iranian volleyball player (born 1989)

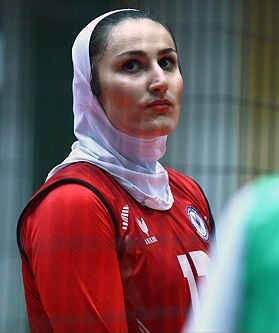

Personal information
- Born: March 7, 1989 (age 37); Isfahan, Iran
- Height: 1.88 m (6 ft 2 in)
- Weight: 75 kg (165 lb)
- Spike: 3.07 m (121 in)
- Block: 2.95 m (116 in)

Volleyball information
- Position: middle blocker
- Current club: Zob Ahan Cultural and Sport Club
- Number: 17

National team
| Iran women's national volleyball team |

Shekoufeh Safari (Persian: شکوفه صفری, born 7 March 1989) is an Iranian volleyball player from Iran women's national volleyball team who plays for the Women's National Team and Zob Ahan Cultural and Sport Club. She is in the position of middle blocker.
