= Zeinab Giveh =

Iranian volleyball player

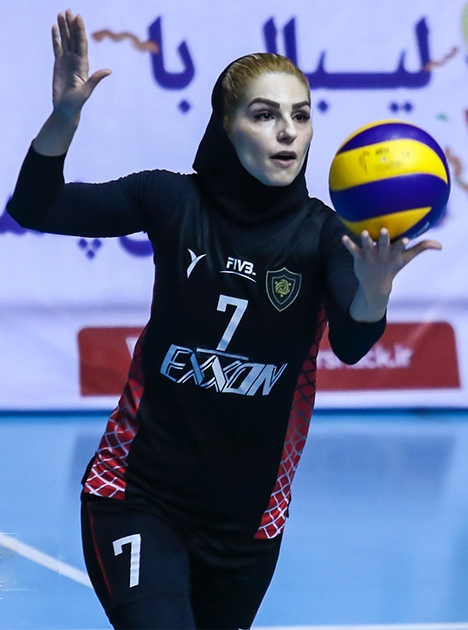
- Iranian women volleyball league 2019. Saipa vs. Exon Tehran

Personal information
- Full name: Zeinab Ali Giveh
- Born: July 11, 1983 (age 43) Tehran, Iran
- Height: 1.77 m (5 ft 10 in)
- Weight: 61 kg (134 lb)
- Spike: 2.70 m (106 in)
- Block: 2.55 m (100 in)

Volleyball information
- Position: Outside hitter
- Current club: (Bulgaria) Shumen W
- Number: 7

Career
- Years: Team
- 2003–2008 2008–2009 2009–2012 2012–2016 2017–: Azad University; Persepolis VC; Giti Pasand; Azad University; Shumen W

Zeinab Giveh (Persian: زینب گیوه, born 20 July 1983) is a volleyball player from Iran, who plays as outside hitter for the Iran women's National Team and Shumen W Club.

Giveh was born in Tehran. She is the current first captain of Women's National Team. In January 2017, she and Maedeh Borhani, her teammate and the second captain of Women's National Team joined the Bulgarian club, Shumen W to become the first Iranian female volleyball players who plays abroad.
