= Mahsa Saberi =

Iranian volleyball player (born 1993)

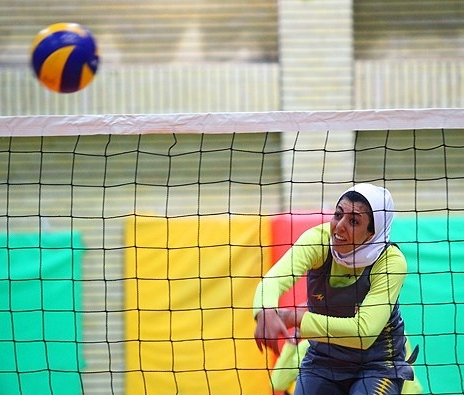
- Saberi playing for Iran national team

Personal information
- Full name: Mahsa Saberi
- Nationality: Iranian
- Born: 14 February 1993 (age 33); Gorgan, Iran
- Height: 1.78 m (5 ft 10 in)
- Weight: 70 kg (154 lb)
- Spike: 2.80 m (110 in)
- Block: 2.90 m (114 in)

Volleyball information
- Position: Outside hitter

National team
Iran women's national volleyball team
Honours
Women's volleyball
Representing Iran
Islamic Solidarity Games
Silver medal – second place	2021 Konya	Team

Mahsa Saberi (Persian: مهسا صابری; born 14 February 1993, in Gorgan); She is a player of the Iran women's national volleyball team. In 2018, she joined to the Turkish club Balıkesir DSİ with Mona Ashofteh and she is currently a player of this club. She also has a history of playing for Sarmayeh Bank Tehran VC and winning the Iranian Super League. She plays as an Outside Hitter.

== Personal life ==
On 14 February 2026, Saberi posted in support of the 2025–2026 Iranian protests on her Instagram, stating: "The greatest honor I have ever had was to be a compatriot with you. How dear and magnificent you are."
