= Irina Lukomskaya =

Kazakhstani volleyball player

Personal information
- Nationality: Kazakhstan
- Born: 19 March 1991 (age 35)
- Height: 1.76 m (5 ft 9 in)
- Weight: 66 kg (146 lb)
- Spike: 280 cm (110 in)
- Block: 270 cm (110 in)

Volleyball information
- Number: 9

Career
Years	Teams
2014	(Kazakhstan) Zhetysu Almaty

Irina Lukomskaya (Ирина Гавриловна Лукомская (Кузнецова) born 19 March 1991) is a Kazakhstani female volleyball player. She is a member of the Kazakhstan women's national volleyball team and played for Zhetysu Almaty in 2014. She was part of the Kazakhstani national team at the 2014 FIVB Volleyball Women's World Championship in Italy.

== Clubs ==
- (Kazakhstan) Zhetysu Almaty (2014)
