= Inna Matveyeva =

Kazakhstani volleyball player

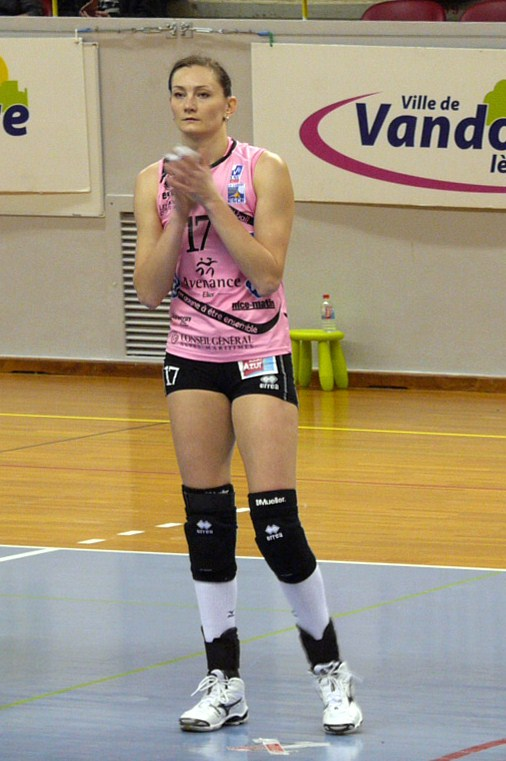

Personal information
- Nationality: Kazakhstan
- Born: 12 October 1978 (age 48) Leninogorsk, Kazakh SSR, Soviet Union
- Height: 1.86 m (6 ft 1 in)
- Weight: 70 kg (154 lb)
- Spike: 303 cm (119 in)
- Block: 294 cm (116 in)

Volleyball information
- Number: 16

Career
- Years: Team
- 2014: (Kazakhstan) Irtysh Kazchrome

Inna Matveyeva (born 12 October 1978) is a retired Kazakhstani female volleyball player. She is a member of the Kazakhstan women's national volleyball team and played for Irtysh Kazchrome in 2014.

She participated in the 2008 Summer Olympics. She was part of the Kazakhstani national team at the 2014 FIVB Volleyball Women's World Championship in Italy.

== Clubs ==
- (Kazakhstan) Irtysh Kazchrome (2014)
