= Korinna Ishimtseva =

Kazakhstani volleyball player

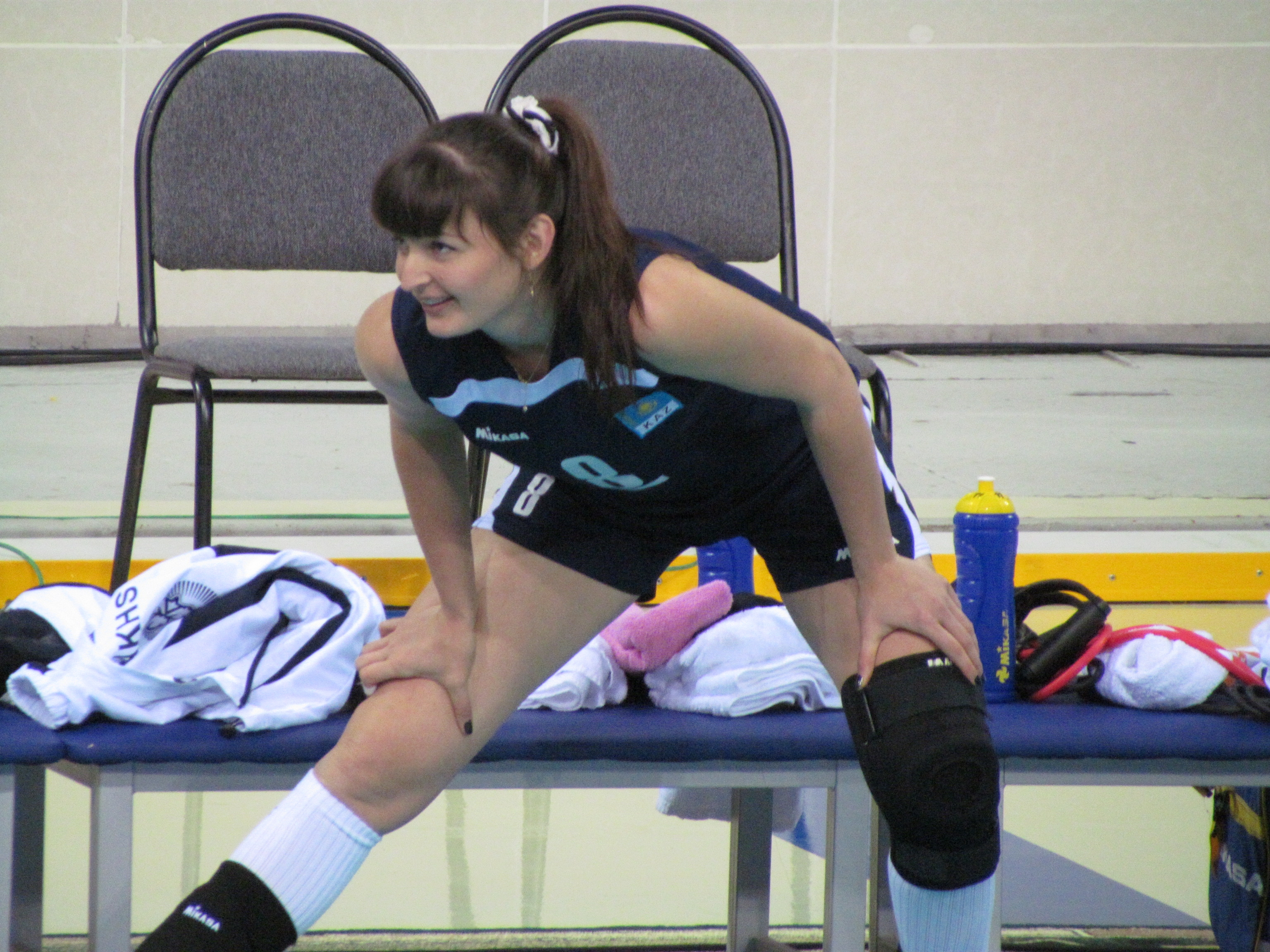

Personal information
- Nationality: Kazakhstan
- Born: 8 February 1984 (age 42); Pavlodar, Kazakh SSR, Soviet Union
- Height: 1.87 m (6 ft 2 in)
- Weight: 69 kg (152 lb)
- Spike: 300 cm (120 in)
- Block: 280 cm (110 in)

Volleyball information
- Number: 8

Career
Years	Teams
2014	(Kazakhstan) Zhetysu Almaty

Korinna Ishimtseva (born 8 February 1984) is a Kazakhstani female volleyball player. She is a member of the Kazakhstan women's national volleyball team and played for Zhetysu Almaty in 2014.

She was part of the Kazakhstani national team at the 2014 FIVB Volleyball Women's World Championship in Italy.

== Clubs ==
- (Kazakhstan) Zhetysu Almaty (2014)
