= Iran women's national volleyball team =

National sports team

Iran
- Association: IRIVF
- Confederation: AVC
- Head coach: Alireza Toloukian
- FIVB ranking: 44 ▲3 (24 May 2026)

Uniforms
Home	Away

Asian Championship
- Appearances: 9 (First in 2007)
- Best result: 4th (2026)
- iranvolleyball.com
Honours
Asian Games
Bronze medal – third place	1966 Bangkok	Team
Islamic Solidarity Games
Silver medal – second place	2021 Konya	Team
Bronze medal – third place	2025 Riyadh	Team
CAVA Championship
Gold medal – first place	2026 Kathmandu	Team
Gold medal – first place	2025 Tashkent	Team
Bronze medal – third place	2024 Kathmandu	Team

The Iran women's national volleyball team is the national women's volleyball team of Iran.

== Current roster ==
The following is the Iranian roster

No.	Name	Date of birth	Height	Weight	Spike	Block	2016 club
2	Negin Shirtari	3 March 1998	1.86 m (6 ft 1 in)	80 kg (180 lb)	281 cm (111 in)	271 cm (107 in)	(Iran) Sarmayeh Bank
4	Soudabeh Bagherpour	16 September 1990	1.81 m (5 ft 11 in)	74 kg (163 lb)	281 cm (111 in)	271 cm (107 in)	(Iran) Sarmayeh Bank
6	Shabnam Alikhani	25 September 1992	1.72 m (5 ft 8 in)	65 kg (143 lb)	271 cm (107 in)	261 cm (103 in)	(Iran) Sarmayeh Bank
7	Zeinab Giveh (C)	11 July 1983	1.77 m (5 ft 10 in)	64 kg (141 lb)	265 cm (104 in)	255 cm (100 in)	(Iran) Sarmayeh Bank
8	Mahsa Saberi	14 February 1993	1.78 m (5 ft 10 in)	73 kg (161 lb)	280 cm (110 in)	270 cm (110 in)	(Iran) Sarmayeh Bank
9	Neda chamlanian	7 March 1994	1.82 m (6 ft 0 in)	72 kg (159 lb)	275 cm (108 in)	265 cm (104 in)	(Iran) Sarmayeh Bank
10	Maedeh Borhani	22 June 1988	1.83 m (6 ft 0 in)	72 kg (159 lb)	287 cm (113 in)	277 cm (109 in)	(Iran) Sarmayeh Bank
11	Mahsa Kadkhoda	22 June 1993	1.79 m (5 ft 10 in)	72 kg (159 lb)	275 cm (108 in)	265 cm (104 in)	(Iran) Sarmayeh Bank
12	Farzaneh Zerei	29 October 1991	1.82 m (6 ft 0 in)	73 kg (161 lb)	273 cm (107 in)	260 cm (100 in)	(Iran) Sarmayeh Bank
13	Negar Kiani	8 June 1992	1.70 m (5 ft 7 in)	60 kg (130 lb)	259 cm (102 in)	249 cm (98 in)	(Iran) Sarmayeh Bank
16	Farnoosh Sheikhi	13 May 1990	1.81 m (5 ft 11 in)	65 kg (143 lb)	285 cm (112 in)	275 cm (108 in)	(Iran) Sarmayeh Bank
17	Shekoufeh Safari	7 March 1989	1.88 m (6 ft 2 in)	81 kg (179 lb)	290 cm (110 in)	280 cm (110 in)	(Iran) Sarmayeh Bank

== Tournament records ==
=== Asian Championship ===
Year	Rank	Pld	W	L	SW	SL
(Australia) 1975 to (China) 2005	did not enter					
(Thailand) 2007	12th place	6	0	6	3	18
(Vietnam) 2009	8th place	8	2	6	6	19
(Taiwan) 2011	8th place	7	1	6	4	20
(Thailand) 2013	8th place	8	2	6	7	20
(China) 2015	8th place	7	1	6	7	22
(Philippines) 2017	9th place	6	3	3	11	12
(South Korea) 2019	7th place	6	2	4	7	14
(Philippines) 2021	Cancelled due to COVID-19 pandemic					
(Thailand) 2023	10th place	6	3	3	10	13
(China) 2026	4th place	6	3	3	9	11
Total	8/21	60	17	43	64	149

=== Asian Games ===
Year	Rank	Pld	W	L	SW	SL
(Indonesia) 1962	did not enter					
(Thailand) 1966	3rd Place	5	3	2	9	8
(Thailand) 1970	4th place	7	4	3	12	10
(Iran) 1974	5th place	4	0	4	0	12
(Thailand) 1978 to (Japan) 2026	did not enter					
(Qatar) 2030	Future events					
(Saudi Arabia) 2034	Future events					
Total	3/15	16	7	9	21	30

=== AVC Cup (2008–2022) ===
Year	Rank	Pld	W	L	SW	SL
(Thailand) 2008	did not enter					
(China) 2010	8th place	6	0	6	0	18
(Kazakhstan) 2012	8th place	6	0	6	1	18
(China) 2014	7th place	6	1	5	6	15
(Vietnam) 2016	6th place	6	1	5	7	16
(Thailand) 2018	8th place	7	4	3	14	14
(Taiwan) 2020	Cancelled due to COVID-19 pandemic in Asia					
(Philippines) 2022	7th place	7	2	5	9	15
Total	6/7	38	8	30	37	96

=== AVC Cup ===
Year	Rank	Pld	W	L	SW	SL
(Thailand) 2022	did not enter					
(Indonesia) 2023	5th place	6	4	2	12	9
(Philippines) 2024	6th place	6	2	4	7	14
(Vietnam) 2025	6th place	7	4	3	16	14
(Philippines) 2026	7th place	6	3	3	11	9
Total	3/4	25	13	12	46	46

=== Islamic Solidarity Games ===
Year	Rank	Pld	W	L	SW	SL
(Azerbaijan) 2017	did not enter					
(Turkey) 2021	Runners-up	4	2	2	6	8
(Saudi Arabia) 2025	3rd place	5	3	2	9	6
(Malaysia) 2029	Future event					
Total	2/3	9	5	4	15	14

=== CAVA Championship ===
CAVA Championship record
Year	Position
(Nepal) 2024	3rd place, bronze medalist(s)
(Uzbekistan) 2025	1st place, gold medalist(s)
(Nepal) 2026	1st place, gold medalist(s)
