= Wen I-tzu =

Taiwanese volleyball player (born 1991)

Wen I Tzu
Personal information
- Nationality: Chinese Taipei
- Born: 31 October 1991 (age 35)
- Height: 175 cm (69 in)
- Weight: 64 kg (141 lb)
- Spike: 281 cm (111 in)
- Block: 273 cm (107 in)

Volleyball information
- Number: 13 (national team)

National team
- Years: Team
- 2012: Chinese Taipei

Wen I Tzu (born 31 October 1991) is a Taiwanese female volleyball player.

She participated in the 2012 FIVB Volleyball World Grand Prix. She was part of the Chinese Taipei women's national volleyball team.
