= Farnoosh Sheikhi =

Iranian volleyball player

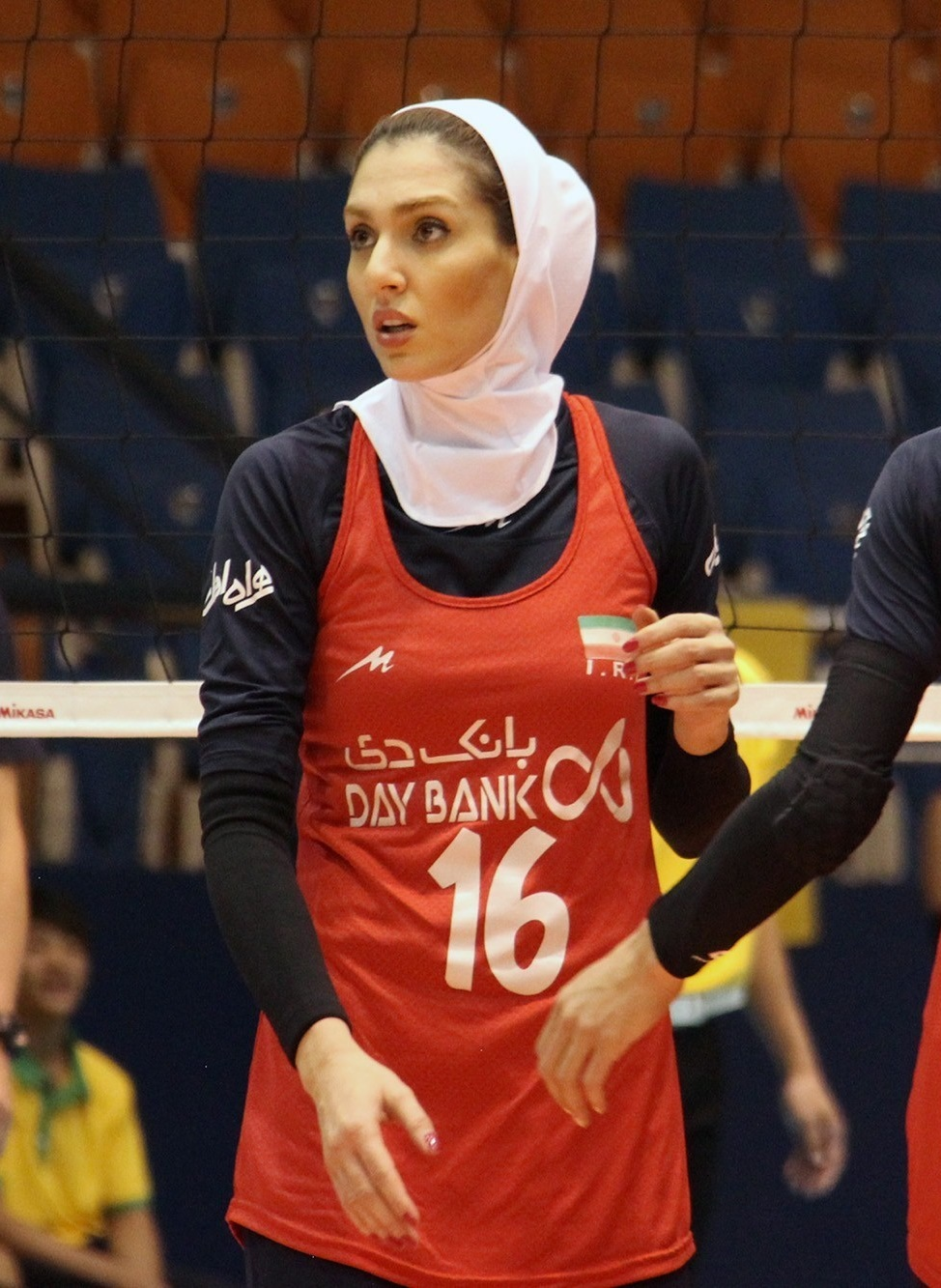
- Sheikhi playing for Iran national team

Personal information
- Nickname: Farnooshi
- Nationality: Iranian
- Born: 13 May 1990 (age 36); Gorgan, Iran
- Hometown: Tehran
- Height: 1.81 m (5 ft 11 in)
- Weight: 68 kg (150 lb)
- Spike: 2.85 m (112 in)
- Block: 2.75 m (108 in)

Volleyball information
- Position: Middle blocker
- Current club: Dauphines Charleroi
- Number: 16

Farnoosh Sheikhi (Persian: فرنوش شیخی; born 13 May 1990) is an Iranian volleyball player who plays for Iran women's national volleyball team since 2009. She was a member of the national team in 2012 Asian Women's Cup Volleyball Championship. Sheikhi plays for Dauphines Charleroi as a middle blocker. She is first Iranian player in volleyball Belgian League, and first player who wear veil.

Individuals: 2012 Iranian super cup "best blocker" 2013 Iranian superleague "fair play" 2013 Iranian superleague "first best middle blocker" 2014 Iranian superleague "first best middle blocker" 2015 Iranian superleague "first best middle blocker" 2016 Iranian superleague "first best middle blocker" 2016 Iranian superleague "MVP" 2017 central Asian championship "best middle blocker"

== Personal life ==
In May 2017, Sheikhi married Kaveh Rezaei, a footballer who plays as a striker for R. Charleroi S.C. in Belgian First Division A. Her father was a hosteler and died in a plane crash in January 2019.
