= Maedeh Borhani =

Iranian volleyball player

Maedeh Borhani ( MADI )
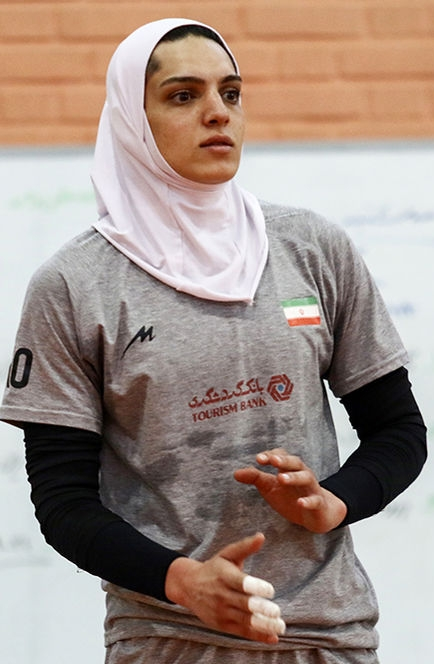

Personal information
- Full name: Maedeh Borhani Esfahani
- Nickname: Madi
- Born: 22 June 1988 (age 38); Isfahan, Iran
- Height: 1.83 m (6 ft 0 in)
- Weight: 71 kg (157 lb)
- Spike: 305 cm (120 in)
- Block: 290 cm (114 in)

Volleyball information
- Position: OP, OH
- Current club: Khorfakkan, UAE
- Number: 10

National team
Iran women's national volleyball team
Honours
Women's volleyball
Representing Iran
Islamic Solidarity Games
Silver medal – second place	2021 Konya	Team

Maedeh Borhani Esfahani (Persian: مائده برهانی اصفهانی, born 22 June 1988) is a volleyball player from Iran, who plays as an Opposite hitter and Captain of the Iran Women's National Volleyball Team. Her transfer to the Bulgarian club, Shumen W made her the first ever Iranian female volleyball player who plays outside the country and abroad. She joined Maldive police club in 2017–2018, Turkish league 1 (kecioren club) in 2018–2019, Turkish league 1 (Samsun Anakent Spor ) in 2019–2020, Turkish league 1 Nevsehir BLD spor in 2020–2021, Turkish league 1 Numune GENÇLIK clup in 2021–2022, Greece A1 league Ilisiakos in 2022–2023. UAE superleague SWS in 2023-2024 and currently playing in UAE super league Khorfakkan in 2024–2025.

Honors:

- MVP in Islamic solidarity games 2021 in konya/Turkey.

- best OH in Arab cup 2023

she has already started her career as a coach.

== Early life ==
She was born in Isfahan, Iran. Borhani started professional Volleyball quite late, in 2005 when she was 17.However two years later, in 2007, she was invited to Iran women's national volleyball team.
