= 2022 AVC Cup for Women =

International indoor volleyball tournament

2022 Asian Women's Volleyball Cup

Tournament details
- Host country: Philippines
- City: Pasig
- Dates: 21–29 August
- Teams: 9 (from 1 confederation)
- Venue: 1 (in 1 host city)

Final positions
- Champions: Japan (1st title)
- Runners-up: China
- Third place: Thailand
- Fourth place: Vietnam

Tournament awards
- MVP: (Japan) Mika Shibata
- Best Setter: (Thailand) Pornpun Guedpard
- Best OH: (China) Wu Mengjie (Thailand) Chatchu-on Moksri
- Best MB: (Japan) Hiroyo Yamanaka (China) Hu Mingyuan
- Best OPP: (China) Zhou Yetong
- Best Libero: (Japan) Rena Mizusugi

Tournament statistics
- Matches played: 28
- Attendance: 37,700 (1,346 per match)

The 2022 Asian Women's Volleyball Cup, so-called 2022 AVC Cup for Women was the seventh edition of the Asian Cup, a biennial international volleyball tournament organised by the Asian Volleyball Confederation (AVC) with Philippine National Volleyball Federation (PNVF). The tournament was held at PhilSports Arena, Pasig, Philippines from 21 to 29 August 2022.

As hosts, Philippines automatically qualified for the tournament, while the remaining 9 teams, qualified from the 2019 Asian Women's Volleyball Championship in Seoul, South Korea.

Japan won their first ever title, winning over China in the final.

== Qualification ==
The 10 AVC member associations qualified for the 2022 Asian Women's Volleyball Cup. Philippines qualified as hosts and the 9 remaining teams qualified from the 2019 Asian Championship and wild card entry. But later Indonesia withdrew and Australia took its place, Kazakhstan also withdrew. The 9 AVC member associations were from four zonal associations, including, Central Asia (1 teams), East Asia (4 teams), Oceania (1 team) and Southeast Asia (3 teams).

=== Qualified teams ===
The following teams qualified for the tournament.

Country	Zone	Qualified as	Qualified on	Previous appearances			Previous best performance
Country	Zone	Qualified as	Qualified on	Total	First	Last	Previous best performance
Japan	EAZVA	2019 Asian Championship champions	25 August 2019	6	2008	2018	Runners-up (2018)
Thailand	SEAZVA	2019 Asian Championship runners-up	25 August 2019	6	2008	2018	Champions (2012)
South Korea	EAZVA	2019 Asian Championship 3rd place	25 August 2019	6	2008	2018	Runners-up (2008, 2014)
China	EAZVA	2019 Asian Championship 4th place	25 August 2019	6	2008	2018	Champions (2008, 2010, 2014, 2016, 2018)
Kazakhstan (withdrew)	CAZVA	2019 Asian Championship 5th place	25 August 2019	5	2010	2018	Runners-up (2016)
Chinese Taipei	EAZVA	2019 Asian Championship 6th place	25 August 2019	6	2008	2018	4th place (2018)
Iran	CAZVA	2019 Asian Championship 7th place	25 August 2019	5	2010	2018	6th place (2016)
Indonesia (withdrew)	SEAZVA	2019 Asian Championship 8th place	25 August 2019	0	None		None
Philippines	SEAZVA	Host country	2 December 2021	1	2018	2018	9th place (2018)
Vietnam	SEAZVA	Wild card	2 February 2022	6	2008	2018	4th place (2012)
Australia	OZVA	Reallocation	2 February 2022	2	2008	2018	7th place (2008, 2018)

== Pools composition ==
The overview of pools was released on 17 March 2022.

Pool A	Pool B
Philippines (Hosts)	Japan (1)
South Korea (3)	Thailand (2)
China (4)	Kazakhstan (5)*
Iran (7)	Chinese Taipei (6)
Vietnam	Australia (9)

* Kazakhstan withdrew from the tournament on 16 August 2022

== Venue ==
The three-color Gerflor floor was installed at the venue for this tournament is provided by FIVB through the Volleyball Empowerment program.

All matches
Pasig, Philippines
PhilSports Arena
Capacity: 10,000
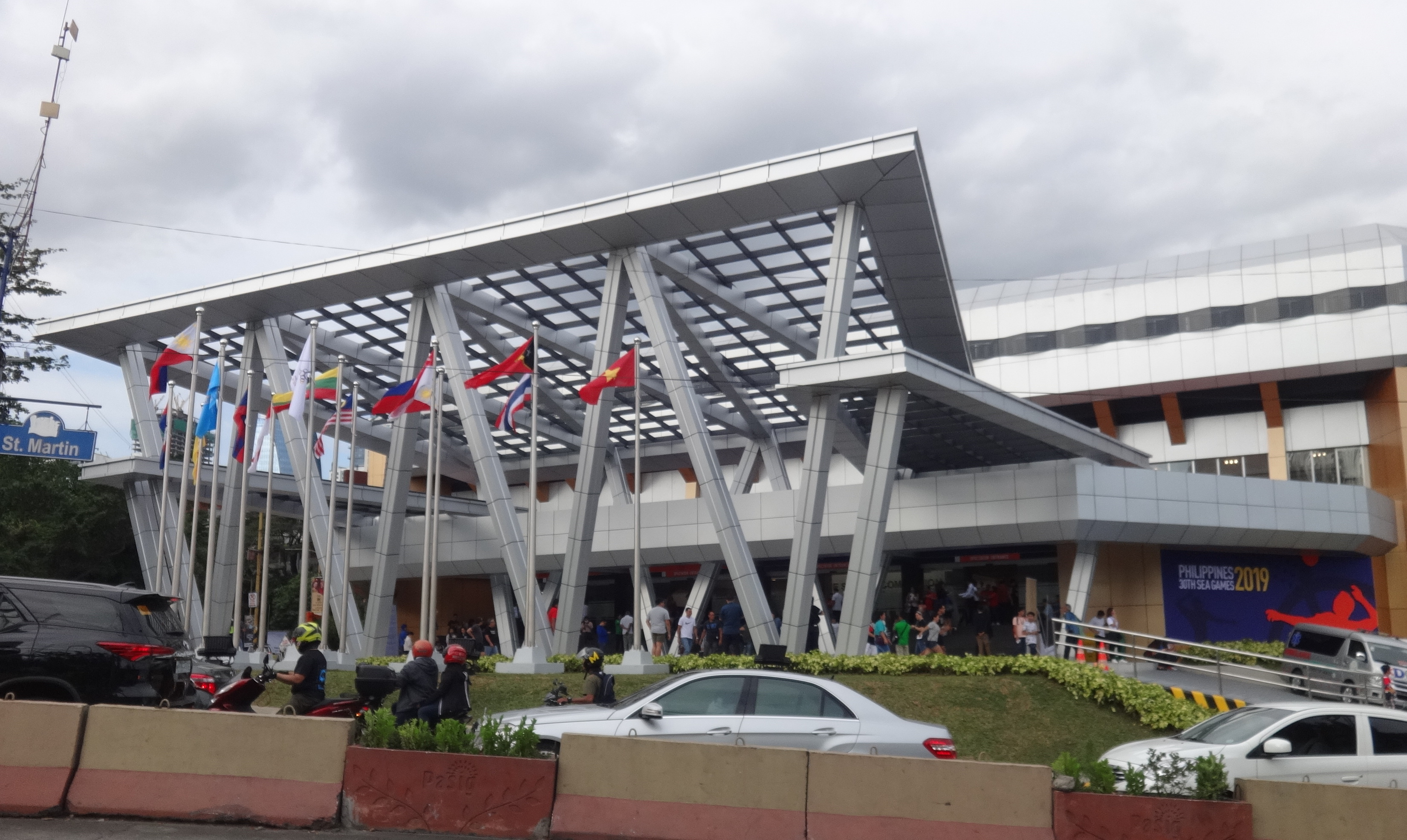

== Pool standing procedure ==
1. Total number of victories (matches won, matches lost)
2. In the event of a tie, the following first tiebreaker will apply: The teams will be ranked by the most point gained per match as follows:
  - Match won 3–0 or 3–1: 3 points for the winner, 0 points for the loser
  - Match won 3–2: 2 points for the winner, 1 point for the loser
  - Match forfeited: 3 points for the winner, 0 points (0–25, 0–25, 0–25) for the loser
3. If teams are still tied after examining the number of victories and points gained, then the AVC will examine the results in order to break the tie in the following order:
  - Set quotient: if two or more teams are tied on the number of points gained, they will be ranked by the quotient resulting from the division of the number of all set won by the number of all sets lost.
  - Points quotient: if the tie persists based on the set quotient, the teams will be ranked by the quotient resulting from the division of all points scored by the total of points lost during all sets.
  - If the tie persists based on the point quotient, the tie will be broken based on the team that won the match of the Round Robin Phase between the tied teams. When the tie in point quotient is between three or more teams, these teams ranked taking into consideration only the matches involving the teams in question.

== Squads ==
The full list of team squads were announced on the competition daily bulletin.

== Preliminary round ==
- All times are Philippine Standard Time (UTC+08:00).

=== Pool A ===
Pos	Team	Pld	W	L	Pts	SW	SL	SR	SPW	SPL	SPR	Qualification
1	China	4	4	0	11	12	3	4.000	364	238	1.529	Quarterfinals
2	Vietnam	4	3	1	10	11	3	3.667	317	264	1.201	Quarterfinals
3	Philippines (H)	4	2	2	6	6	7	0.857	293	284	1.032	Quarterfinals
4	Iran	4	1	3	3	5	9	0.556	265	307	0.863	Quarterfinals
5	South Korea	4	0	4	0	0	12	0.000	154	300	0.513	

(H) Host

Date	Time		Score		Set 1	Set 2	Set 3	Set 4	Set 5	Total	Report
21 Aug	13:00	China	3–0	South Korea	25–9	25–8	25–9			75–26	Report
21 Aug	19:00	Vietnam	3–0	Philippines	25–19	25–17	31–29			81–65	Report
22 Aug	13:00	Vietnam	2–3	China	12–25	6–25	31–29	25–21	12–15	86–115	Report
22 Aug	19:00	Iran	3–0	South Korea	25–10	25–15	25–13			75–38	Report
23 Aug	16:30	Iran	0–3	Vietnam	17–25	14–25	11–25			42–75	Report
23 Aug	19:00	Philippines	0–3	China	16–25	22–25	20–25			58–75	Report
24 Aug	13:00	South Korea	0–3	Vietnam	13–25	13–25	16–25			42–75	Report
24 Aug	19:00	Philippines	3–1	Iran	25–19	25–22	20–25	25–14		95–80	Report
25 Aug	16:00	China	3–1	Iran	24–26	25–19	25–10	25–13		99–68	Report
25 Aug	19:00	South Korea	0–3	Philippines	18–25	13–25	17–25			48–75	Report

=== Pool B ===
Pos	Team	Pld	W	L	Pts	SW	SL	SR	SPW	SPL	SPR	Qualification
1	Japan	3	3	0	9	9	0	MAX	225	155	1.452	Quarterfinals
2	Thailand	3	2	1	6	6	3	2.000	211	176	1.199	Quarterfinals
3	Chinese Taipei	3	1	2	2	3	8	0.375	233	251	0.928	Quarterfinals
4	Australia	3	0	3	1	2	9	0.222	178	265	0.672	Quarterfinals

Date	Time		Score		Set 1	Set 2	Set 3	Set 4	Set 5	Total	Report
21 Aug	16:00	Japan	3–0	Thailand	25–18	25–19	25–22			75–59	Report
22 Aug	10:00	Chinese Taipei	0–3	Japan	22–25	22–25	22–25			66–75	Report
22 Aug	16:00	Australia	0–3	Thailand	9–25	25–27	13–25			47–77	Report
23 Aug	13:00	Australia	2–3	Chinese Taipei	25–23	22–25	27–25	21–25	6–15	101–113	Report
24 Aug	16:00	Thailand	3–0	Chinese Taipei	25–20	25–18	25–16			75–54	Report
25 Aug	13:00	Japan	3–0	Australia	25–4	25–11	25–15			75–30	Report

== Final round ==
- All times are Philippine Standard Time (UTC+8:00).

Quarterfinals
27 August
China	3
Australia	0
27 August
Philippines	1
Thailand	3
27 August
Vietnam	3
Chinese Taipei	2
27 August
Iran	1
Japan	3

Semifinals
28 August
China	3
Thailand	2
28 August
Vietnam	1
Japan	3

Final
29 August
China	1
Japan	3
3rd place match
29 August
Thailand	3
Vietnam	0

5th–8th semifinals
28 August
Chinese Taipei	3
Iran	0
28 August
Australia	2
Philippines	3

5th place match
29 August
Chinese Taipei	3
Philippines	0
7th place match
29 August
Iran	3
Australia	0

=== Quarterfinals ===
Date	Time		Score		Set 1	Set 2	Set 3	Set 4	Set 5	Total	Report
27 Aug	11:00	Vietnam	3–2	Chinese Taipei	19–25	25–17	16–25	25–18	15–10	100–95	Report
27 Aug	14:00	China	3–0	Australia	25–13	25–8	25–8			75–29	Report
27 Aug	17:00	Iran	1–3	Japan	23–25	21–25	28–26	16–25		88–101	Report
27 Aug	20:00	Philippines	1–3	Thailand	18–25	25–23	20–25	9–25		72–98	Report

=== 5th–8th semifinals ===
Date	Time		Score		Set 1	Set 2	Set 3	Set 4	Set 5	Total	Report
28 Aug	10:00	Chinese Taipei	3–0	Iran	25–23	25–19	25–17			75–59	Report
28 Aug	13:00	Australia	2–3	Philippines	25–21	19–25	25–19	18–25	12–15	99–105	Report

=== Semifinals ===
Date	Time		Score		Set 1	Set 2	Set 3	Set 4	Set 5	Total	Report
28 Aug	16:00	China	3–2	Thailand	19–25	25–20	25–14	23–25	15–10	107–94	Report
28 Aug	19:00	Vietnam	1–3	Japan	17–25	22–25	36–34	10–25		85–109	Report

=== 7th place match ===
Date	Time		Score		Set 1	Set 2	Set 3	Set 4	Set 5	Total	Report
29 Aug	10:00	Iran	3–0	Australia	25–19	25–18	25–22			75–59	Report

=== 5th place match ===
Date	Time		Score		Set 1	Set 2	Set 3	Set 4	Set 5	Total	Report
29 Aug	13:00	Chinese Taipei	3–0	Philippines	28–26	25–21	25–21			78–68	Report

=== 3rd place match ===
Date	Time		Score		Set 1	Set 2	Set 3	Set 4	Set 5	Total	Report
29 Aug	16:00	Thailand	3–0	Vietnam	25–19	26–24	25–18			76–61	Report

=== Final ===
Date	Time		Score		Set 1	Set 2	Set 3	Set 4	Set 5	Total	Report
29 Aug	19:00	China	1–3	Japan	23–25	21–25	25–19	16–25		85–94	Report

== Final standings ==
Rank	Team
1st place, gold medalist(s)	Japan
2nd place, silver medalist(s)	China
3rd place, bronze medalist(s)	Thailand
4	Vietnam
5	Chinese Taipei
6	Philippines
7	Iran
8	Australia
9	South Korea

2022 Asian Women's Cup champions

Japan
1st title

14–woman roster
Mika Shibata (c), Yuka Sato, Mizuki Tanaka, Moeri Hanai, Miwako Osanai, Chihiro Sasaki, Hawi Okumu Oba, Nonoka Yamazaki, Asuka Hamamatsu, Mikoto Shima, Hiroyo Yamanaka, Miyu Nakagawa, Rena Mizusugi, Yuki Nishikawa
Head coach
Akira Koshiya

== Awards ==
- Most valuable player
  Mika Shibata (JPN)
- Best setter
  Pornpun Guedpard (THA)
- Best outside spikers
  Wu Mengjie (CHN)
  Chatchu-on Moksri (THA)
- Best middle blockers
  Hiroyo Yamanaka (JPN)
  Hu Mingyuan (CHN)
- Best opposite spiker
  Zhou Yetong (CHN)
- Best libero
  Rena Mizusugi (JPN)

== See also ==
- 2022 Asian Men's Volleyball Cup
- 2022 Asian Women's Volleyball Challenge Cup
