= 2019 Asian Women's Volleyball Championship =

International indoor volleyball tournament

아시아 여자 배구 선수권 대회 대한민국 2019

Tournament details
- Host country: South Korea
- Dates: 18–25 August
- Teams: 13
- Venues: 2 (in 1 host city)

Final positions
- Champions: Japan (5th title)
- Runners-up: Thailand
- Third place: South Korea
- Fourth place: China

Tournament awards
- MVP: (Japan) Mayu Ishikawa

The 2019 Asian Women's Volleyball Championship was the twentieth edition of the Asian Women's Volleyball Championship, a biennial international volleyball tournament organised by the Asian Volleyball Confederation (AVC) with Korea Volleyball Association (KVA). The tournament was held in Seoul, South Korea, from 18 to 25 August 2019. South Korea played host to this event for the first time. The top eight teams of this tournament qualified for the 2020 AVC Women's Volleyball Olympic Qualification Tournament.

== Qualification ==
Following the AVC regulations, The maximum of 16 teams in all AVC events were selected by:

- 1 team for the organizer
- 10 teams based on the rankings of the previous championship
- 5 teams from each of 5 zones (with a qualification tournament if needed)

=== Qualified teams ===
Means of qualification	Dates	Hosts	Quota	Qualifier(s)
Host nation	—N/a	—N/a	1	South Korea^{A}
2017 Asian Championship	9–17 August 2017	(Philippines) Biñan–Muntinlupa	10 7	Japan; Thailand; China; Vietnam; Chinese Taipei; Kazakhstan; Iran; Australia; Philippines
SEAZVA representatives	—N/a	—N/a	1+1	Indonesia^{C} Singapore^{C}
CAZVA representatives	—N/a	—N/a	1+1	India^{D} Sri Lanka^{D}
EAZVA representatives	—N/a	—N/a	1	Hong Kong
OZVA representatives	—N/a	—N/a	1	New Zealand
WAZVA representatives	—N/a	—N/a	1 0	—N/a
Total			13	

^A South Korea qualified as the hosts and was originally top 10 of previous edition. The spot was reallocated to the 11th-ranked team, Hong Kong.
^B Philippines originally qualified, but declined to enter. The spot was reallocated to the next highest ranked nation, New Zealand.
^C SEAZVA was originally allocated one team, but WAZVA declined to enter. The spot was reallocated to Indonesia and Singapore.
^D CEAZVA was originally allocated one team, but WAZVA declined to enter. The spot was reallocated to India and Sri Lanka.

== Venues ==
Second and final rounds	South Korea	Preliminary round
Jamsil Arena	South Korea	Jamsil Students' Gymnasium
Capacity: 11,069	South Korea	Capacity: 7,500
	Seoul (South Korea)	

== Pools composition ==
=== Preliminary round ===
Teams were seeded in the first two positions of each pool following the Serpentine system according to their previous edition. AVC reserved the right to seed the hosts as heads of pool A regardless of the previous ranking. All teams not seeded were drawn to take other available positions in the remaining lines. Each pool had no more than three teams from the same zonal association. The draw was held in Bangkok, Thailand on 19 February 2019.

Ranking from the 2017 Asian Women's Volleyball Championship was shown in brackets except the host (who ranked third) and the teams who did not participate, which were denoted by (–).

Seeded Teams
Pool A	Pool B	Pool C	Pool D
South Korea (Hosts) (3); Iran (9)	Japan (1); Kazakhstan (7)	Thailand (2); Chinese Taipei (6)	China (4); Vietnam (5)
Unseeded Teams
Australia (10); Hong Kong (11) New Zealand (12); Sri Lanka (13) India (–); Indonesia (–) Singapore (–)

Draw

Pool A	Pool B	Pool C	Pool D
South Korea	Japan	Thailand	China
Iran	Kazakhstan	Chinese Taipei	Vietnam
Singapore	Australia	New Zealand	Indonesia
Hong Kong	India		Sri Lanka

== Pool standing procedure ==
1. Number of matches won
2. Match points
3. Sets ratio
4. Points ratio
5. Result of the last match between the tied teams

Match won 3–0 or 3–1: 3 match points for the winner, 0 match points for the loser
Match won 3–2: 2 match points for the winner, 1 match point for the loser

== Preliminary round ==
- All times are Korea Standard Time (UTC+09:00).

=== Pool A ===
Pos	Team	Pld	W	L	Pts	SW	SL	SR	SPW	SPL	SPR	Qualification
1	South Korea (H)	2	2	0	6	6	0	MAX	150	86	1.744	Advance to Pool E and 2020 AVC OQT
2	Iran	2	1	1	3	3	3	1.000	115	125	0.920	Advance to Pool E and 2020 AVC OQT
3	Hong Kong	2	0	2	0	0	6	0.000	96	150	0.640	Advance to Pool G and 2020 AVC OQT playoffs

Updated to match(es) played on 20 August 2019. Source: AVC
(H) Host

Date	Time		Score		Set 1	Set 2	Set 3	Set 4	Set 5	Total	Report
18 Aug	14:00	Iran	0–3	South Korea	17–25	9–25	14–25			40–75	P2
19 Aug	19:00	South Korea	3–0	Hong Kong	25–10	25–14	25–22			75–46	P2
20 Aug	14:00	Hong Kong	0–3	Iran	20–25	15–25	15–25			50–75	P2

=== Pool B ===
Pos	Team	Pld	W	L	Pts	SW	SL	SR	SPW	SPL	SPR	Qualification
1	Japan	3	3	0	9	9	0	MAX	225	134	1.679	Advance to Pool F
2	Kazakhstan	3	2	1	6	6	4	1.500	231	213	1.085	Advance to Pool F and 2020 AVC OQT
3	Australia	3	1	2	3	3	7	0.429	193	230	0.839	Advance to Pool H and 2020 AVC OQT playoffs
4	India	3	0	3	0	2	9	0.222	192	264	0.727	Advance to Pool H and 2020 AVC OQT playoffs

Updated to match(es) played on 20 August 2019. Source: AVC

Date	Time		Score		Set 1	Set 2	Set 3	Set 4	Set 5	Total	Report
18 Aug	11:30	Australia	0–3	Kazakhstan	19–25	20–25	21–25			60–75	P2
18 Aug	14:00	Japan	3–0	India	25–12	25–14	25–8			75–34	P2
19 Aug	14:00	Japan	3–0	Kazakhstan	25–19	25–23	25–18			75–60	P2
19 Aug	14:00	India	1–3	Australia	25–18	17–25	16–25	22–25		80–93	P2
20 Aug	14:00	Japan	3–0	Australia	25–11	25–21	25–8			75–40	P2
20 Aug	16:30	Kazakhstan	3–1	India	21–25	25–16	25–19	25–18		96–78	P2

=== Pool C ===
Pos	Team	Pld	W	L	Pts	SW	SL	SR	SPW	SPL	SPR	Qualification
1	Thailand	2	2	0	6	6	1	6.000	170	117	1.453	Advance to Pool E and 2020 AVC OQT
2	Chinese Taipei	2	1	1	3	4	3	1.333	155	142	1.092	Advance to Pool E and 2020 AVC OQT
3	New Zealand	2	0	2	0	0	6	0.000	84	150	0.560	Advance to Pool G and 2020 AVC OQT playoffs

Updated to match(es) played on 20 August 2019. Source: AVC

Date	Time		Score		Set 1	Set 2	Set 3	Set 4	Set 5	Total	Report
18 Aug	16:30	Thailand	3–1	Chinese Taipei	20–25	25–13	25–22	25–20		95–80	P2
19 Aug	16:30	New Zealand	0–3	Chinese Taipei	12–25	22–25	13–25			47–75	P2
20 Aug	19:00	New Zealand	0–3	Thailand	9–25	13–25	15–25			37–75	P2

=== Pool D ===
Pos	Team	Pld	W	L	Pts	SW	SL	SR	SPW	SPL	SPR	Qualification
1	China	2	2	0	6	6	0	MAX	150	78	1.923	Advance to Pool F
2	Indonesia	2	1	1	3	3	3	1.000	121	119	1.017	Advance to Pool F and 2020 AVC OQT
3	Sri Lanka	2	0	2	0	0	6	0.000	76	150	0.507	Advance to Pool H and 2020 AVC OQT playoffs

Updated to match(es) played on 20 August 2019. Source: AVC

Date	Time		Score		Set 1	Set 2	Set 3	Set 4	Set 5	Total	Report
18 Aug	16:30	China	3–0	Sri Lanka	25–11	25–9	25–12			75–32	P2
19 Aug	16:30	China	3–0	Indonesia	25–15	25–19	25–12			75–46	P2
20 Aug	16:30	Indonesia	3–0	Sri Lanka	25–13	25–15	25–16			75–44	P2

== Second round ==
=== Pool E ===
Pos	Team	Pld	W	L	Pts	SW	SL	SR	SPW	SPL	SPR	Qualification
1	South Korea (H)	3	3	0	9	9	1	9.000	248	177	1.401	Semifinals
2	Thailand	3	2	1	6	7	4	1.750	253	228	1.110	Semifinals
3	Chinese Taipei	3	1	2	3	4	7	0.571	231	249	0.928	5th–8th semifinals
4	Iran	3	0	3	0	1	9	0.111	169	247	0.684	5th–8th semifinals

Updated to match(es) played on 23 August 2019. Source: AVC
(H) Host

Date	Time		Score		Set 1	Set 2	Set 3	Set 4	Set 5	Total	Report
22 Aug	16:30	South Korea	3–0	Chinese Taipei	25–22	25–13	25–19			75–54	P2
22 Aug	19:00	Thailand	3–0	Iran	25–16	25–21	25–13			75–50	P2
23 Aug	11:30	Iran	1–3	Chinese Taipei	25–22	23–25	19–25	12–25		79–97	P2
23 Aug	16:30	South Korea	3–1	Thailand	25–20	23–25	25–17	25–21		98–83	P2

=== Pool F ===
Pos	Team	Pld	W	L	Pts	SW	SL	SR	SPW	SPL	SPR	Qualification
1	China	3	3	0	8	9	2	4.500	247	190	1.300	Semifinals
2	Japan	3	2	1	7	8	3	2.667	244	210	1.162	Semifinals
3	Kazakhstan	3	1	2	3	3	6	0.500	185	202	0.916	5th–8th semifinals
4	Indonesia	3	0	3	0	0	9	0.000	151	225	0.671	5th–8th semifinals

Updated to match(es) played on 23 August 2019. Source: AVC

Date	Time		Score		Set 1	Set 2	Set 3	Set 4	Set 5	Total	Report
22 Aug	11:30	China	3–0	Kazakhstan	25–23	25–12	25–15			75–50	P2
22 Aug	14:00	Japan	3–0	Indonesia	25–19	25–21	25–13			75–53	P2
23 Aug	14:00	Kazakhstan	3–0	Indonesia	25–19	25–15	25–18			75–52	P2
23 Aug	19:00	Japan	2–3	China	25–14	11–25	21–25	25–18	12–15	94–97	P2

=== Pool G ===
Pos	Team	Pld	W	L	Pts	SW	SL	SR	SPW	SPL	SPR	Qualification
1	Hong Kong	1	1	0	3	3	0	MAX	75	52	1.442	9th–12th semifinals and 2020 AVC OQT playoffs
2	New Zealand	1	0	1	0	0	3	0.000	52	75	0.693	9th–12th semifinals and 2020 AVC OQT playoffs

Updated to match(es) played on 22 August 2019. Source: AVC

Date	Time		Score		Set 1	Set 2	Set 3	Set 4	Set 5	Total	Report
22 Aug	14:00	Hong Kong	3–0	New Zealand	25–18	25–15	25–19			75–52	P2

=== Pool H ===
Pos	Team	Pld	W	L	Pts	SW	SL	SR	SPW	SPL	SPR	Qualification
1	Australia	2	2	0	6	6	1	6.000	168	129	1.302	9th–12th semifinals and 2020 AVC OQT playoffs
2	India	2	1	1	2	4	5	0.800	198	178	1.112	9th–12th semifinals and 2020 AVC OQT playoffs
3	Sri Lanka	2	0	2	1	2	6	0.333	134	193	0.694	13rd place

Updated to match(es) played on 23 August 2019. Source: AVC

Date	Time		Score		Set 1	Set 2	Set 3	Set 4	Set 5	Total	Report
22 Aug	16:30	Sri Lanka	2–3	India	27–25	13–25	30–28	10–25	5–15	85–118	P2
23 Aug	14:00	Australia	3–0	Sri Lanka	25–17	25–17	25–15			75–49	P2

== Final round ==
=== 9th–12th Classification round ===
Ninth place playoffs
24 August
Hong Kong	0
India	3
24 August
Australia	3
New Zealand	2

Ninth place
25 August
India	2
Australia	3
Eleventh place
25 August
Hong Kong	3
New Zealand	1

==== 9th–12th semifinals ====
Date	Time		Score		Set 1	Set 2	Set 3	Set 4	Set 5	Total	Report
24 Aug	11:00	Hong Kong	0–3	India	19–25	14–25	22–25			55–75	P2
24 Aug	13:30	Australia	3–2	New Zealand	25–13	25–20	24–26	26–28	15–9	115–96	P2

==== 11th place match ====
Date	Time		Score		Set 1	Set 2	Set 3	Set 4	Set 5	Total	Report
25 Aug	11:00	Hong Kong	3–1	New Zealand	16–25	25–13	25–15	25–17		91–70	P2

==== 9th place match ====
Date	Time		Score		Set 1	Set 2	Set 3	Set 4	Set 5	Total	Report
25 Aug	13:30	India	2–3	Australia	25–22	25–22	22–25	21–25	12–15	105–109	P2

=== 5th–8th Classification round ===
Fifth place playoffs
24 August
Chinese Taipei	3
Indonesia	1
24 August
Kazakhstan	3
Iran	0

Fifth place
25 August
Chinese Taipei	1
Kazakhstan	3
Seventh place
25 August
Indonesia	2
Iran	3

==== 5th–8th semifinals ====
Date	Time		Score		Set 1	Set 2	Set 3	Set 4	Set 5	Total	Report
24 Aug	11:00	Chinese Taipei	3–1	Indonesia	25–20	25–18	23–25	28–26		101–89	P2
24 Aug	16:00	Kazakhstan	3–0	Iran	25–17	25–21	26–24			76–62	P2

==== 7th place match ====
Date	Time		Score		Set 1	Set 2	Set 3	Set 4	Set 5	Total	Report
25 Aug	16:00	Indonesia	2–3	Iran	27–25	25–18	20–25	13–25	13–15	98–108	P2

==== 5th place match ====
Date	Time		Score		Set 1	Set 2	Set 3	Set 4	Set 5	Total	Report
25 Aug	11:00	Chinese Taipei	1–3	Kazakhstan	25–22	19–25	22–25	21–25		87–97	P2

=== Final four ===
Semifinals
24 August
South Korea	1
Japan	3
24 August
China	1
Thailand	3

Final
25 August
Japan	3
Thailand	1
3rd place match
25 August
South Korea	3
China	0

==== Semifinals ====
Date	Time		Score		Set 1	Set 2	Set 3	Set 4	Set 5	Total	Report
24 Aug	13:30	South Korea	1–3	Japan	25–22	23–25	24–26	26–28		98–101	P2
24 Aug	16:00	China	1–3	Thailand	25–23	22–25	32–34	23–25		102–107	P2

==== 3rd place match ====
Date	Time		Score		Set 1	Set 2	Set 3	Set 4	Set 5	Total	Report
25 Aug	13:30	South Korea	3–0	China	25–21	25–20	25–22			75–63	P2

==== Final ====
Date	Time		Score		Set 1	Set 2	Set 3	Set 4	Set 5	Total	Report
25 Aug	16:00	Japan	3–1	Thailand	25–22	18–25	25–18	25–23		93–88	P2

== Final standings ==
Rank	Team
1st place, gold medalist(s)	Japan
2nd place, silver medalist(s)	Thailand
3rd place, bronze medalist(s)	South Korea
4	China
5	Kazakhstan
6	Chinese Taipei
7	Iran
8	Indonesia
9	Australia
10	India
11	Hong Kong
12	New Zealand
13	Sri Lanka

Qualified for the Asian Olympic Qualification Tournament and 2022 Asian Cup [except India; later Indonesia (Australia replace them) and Kazakhstan withdrew]
Already qualified as hosts for the 2020 Summer Olympics
Qualified for the 2022 Asian Cup as host

2019 Asian Women's champions

Japan
5th title

Team roster

Setter: Nanami Seki, Tamaki Matsui
Middle blocker: Mai Irisawa, Nichika Yamada, Shion Hirayama, Kotomi Osaka
Outside hitters: Miwako Osanai, Yuri Yoshino, Mayu Ishikawa, Yuki Nishikawa
Opposite: Miyu Nakagawa, Haruna Soga
Libero: Rena Mizusugi, Minami Nishimura

Head Coach: Noboru Aihara

== Awards ==
- Most valuable player

(Japan) Mayu Ishikawa

- Best setter

(Thailand) Nootsara Tomkom

- Best outside spikers

(Japan) Mayu Ishikawa
(South Korea) Kim Yeon-koung

- Best middle blockers

(Japan) Nichika Yamada
(China) Yang Hanyu

- Best opposite spiker

(Japan) Haruna Soga

- Best libero

(Thailand) Piyanut Pannoy

== Qualifying teams for 2020 Asian Women's Olympic Qualification Tournament ==
Team	Qualified on	Previous appearances in AVC OQT
South Korea	18 August 2019	7 (1972, 1996, 2000, 2004, 2008, 2012, 2016)
Thailand	18 August 2019	4 (2004, 2008, 2012, 2016)
Chinese Taipei	19 August 2019	3 (1996, 2004, 2012)
Kazakhstan	20 August 2019	2 (2008, 2016)
Iran	20 August 2019	0 (debut)
Indonesia	20 August 2019	0 (debut)
India	24 August 2019	0 (debut)
Australia	24 August 2019	0 (debut)

== See also ==
- 2019 Asian Men's Volleyball Championship
- 2019 Asian Women's U23 Volleyball Championship
- 2019 Asian Women's Club Volleyball Championship
