= Shan Danna =

Chinese volleyball player (born 1991)

Personal information
- Full name: Shan Danna
- Nationality: Chinese
- Born: 8 October 1991 (age 35); Zhejiang, China
- Hometown: Zhejiang, China
- Height: 1.68 m (5 ft 6 in)
- Weight: 60 kg (132 lb)
- Spike: 290 cm (110 in)
- Block: 285 cm (112 in)

Volleyball information
- Position: Libero
- Current club: Zhejiang New Century Tourism
- Number: 10

National team
2011–2016; 2013	China; U23-China
Honours
Women's volleyball
Representing China
World Championship
Silver medal – second place	2014 Italy	Team
FIVB World Cup
Bronze medal – third place	2011 Japan	Team
Asian Championship
Gold medal – first place	2015 Tianjin	Team
Asian Cup Championship
Gold medal – first place	2016 Vinh Phuc	Team
Silver medal – second place	2012 Almaty	Team
Women's U23 World Championship
Gold medal – first place	2013 Mexicali	Team
- Last updated: October 2017

Shan Danna (simplified Chinese: 单丹娜; traditional Chinese: 單丹娜; pinyin: Shān Dānnà; born 8 October 1991 in Zhejiang) is a retired Chinese volleyball player. She represented her nation at the London 2012 Olympics. She won the 2013 FIVB Women's U23 Volleyball World Championship.

== Clubs ==
- (China) Zhejiang New Century Tourism (2009 - 2017)
