= Wang Na (volleyball) =

Chinese volleyball player (born 1990)

Personal information
- Full name: Wang Na
- Nationality: Chinese
- Born: 25 February 1990 (age 36) Jinan, Shandong, China
- Home town: Shandong, China
- Height: 1.79 m (5 ft 10 in)
- Weight: 63 kg (139 lb)
- Spike: 305 cm (120 in)
- Block: 295 cm (116 in)

Volleyball information
- Position: Setter
- Current club: Zhejiang Jiaxing Xitang Ancient Town
- Number: 9

Career
- Years: Team
- 2009–2019 2019 2020-present: Zhejiang; Supreme Chonburi; Zhejiang

National team
- Years: Team
- 2011–2016: China
Honours
Women's volleyball
Representing China
World Championship
Silver medal – second place	2014 Italy	Team
Asian Cup Championship
Gold medal – first place	2016 Vinh Phuc	Team
- Updated on February 2019

Wang Na (Chinese: 王娜; born 25 February 1990 in Shandong) is a female Chinese volleyball player who won the 2014 FIVB World Championship silver medal.

== Clubs ==
- (China) Zhejiang New Century Tourism (2009–2018)
- (Thailand) Supreme Chonburi (2019)
- (China) Zhejiang Jiaxing Xitang Ancient Town (2020–present)

== Awards ==
=== Club ===
- 2018–19 Thailand League - Runner-Up, with Supreme Chonburi
- 2019 Thai–Denmark Super League - Champion, with Supreme Chonburi
- 2019 Asian Club Championship - Runner-Up, with Supreme Chonburi

== National team ==
=== Senior team ===
- 2014 World Championship - Silver medal
