= Canberra Heat Volleyball Club =

Australian national league volleyball club

Canberra Heat
- Founded: 1998
- Ground: The Furnace, Lyneham ACT
- Owner: Volleyball ACT
- Head Coach: (Australia) Ben Hardy
- Captain: (Australia) Andre Borgeaud
- League: Australian Volleyball League
- Website: Club home page

Uniforms
Home	Away

Canberra Heat Volleyball Club is an Australian national league volleyball club based in Canberra, Australia. Canberra Heat Men have represented Australia at the Asian Men's Club Volleyball Championship.

Canberra Heat Men began life as the Canberra Cobras in 1998, then renamed to Canberra Chiefs in 1999 before becoming the Canberra Heat in 2002. Les Young commenced as head coach in 2010 and led the team to an unequalled two national championships, five national silver medals and two national bronze medals in his nine years coaching the club. Ben Hardy commenced as head coach in 2020/21 and secured the national championship with the team in 2022.

== Honours ==
Australian Volleyball League

- Gold (3): 2011, 2015, 2022
- Silver (7): 1999, 2002, 2013, 2014, 2016, 2018, 2019
- Bronze (5): 1998, 2001, 2003, 2010, 2017

Asian Men's Club Volleyball Championship

- 2017 Asian Men's Club Volleyball Championship (10th)
- 2018 Asian Men's Club Volleyball Championship (9th)
- 2023 Asian Men's Club Volleyball Championship (12th)

== Asian Club Championship Rosters ==
2017 Roster
#	First Name	Surname	Position
1	Martin	COLLINS	Setter
3	Kevin	PHANG	Outside hitter
4	Elliott	VILES	Outside hitter
5	Michael	WATSON	Setter
6	Simon	COAT	Outside hitter
10	Jordan	POWER	Outside hitter
13	James	WEIR	Middle blocker
14	Matthew	SNEDDON	Middle blocker
15	Matthew	AUBREY	Opposite
16	Jack	CONNELL	Libero
17	Kieran	ACKHURST	Middle blocker
18	Steven	DUZEVICH	Outside hitter
	Les	YOUNG	Coach

2018 Roster
#	First Name	Surname	Position			
1	Martin	COLLINS	Setter			
4	Harry	CLAYDEN	Opposite			
5	Alexander	DUNNING	Outside hitter			
6	Cameron	STEER	Middle blocker			
7	Jack	HALLEY	Libero			
10	Jordan	POWER	Passer Hitter			
11	Jackson	HOLLAND	Libero			
13	Conal	MCAINSH	Middle blocker			
16	Michael	WATSON	Passer Hitter			
17	Matthew	AUBREY	Opposite			
18	Rory	WELSH	Setter	Les	YOUNG	Coach

== Australian Volleyball League Rosters ==
2017/18 Roster
#	First Name	Surname	Position
1	Martin	COLLINS	Setter
2	David	DARCY	Opposite
3	Michael	WATSON	Setter
4	Harry	CLAYDEN	Outside hitter
5	Riley	BUDD	Outside hitter
6	Cameron	STEER	Middle blocker
7	Jeremy	POPLE	Outside hitter
8	Malachi	MURCH	Outside hitter
9	Kevin	PHANG	Outside hitter
10	Jordan	POWER	Outside hitter
11	Jackson	HOLLAND	Middle blocker
12	Thomas	MARTIN	Middle blocker
13	Steve	DUZEVICH	Outside hitter
14	Matthew	SNEDDON	Middle blocker
15	Jackson	JOLLY	Middle blocker
16	Jack	CONNELL	Libero
17	Kieran	ACKHURST	Middle blocker
18	Alex	SOUTHWELL	Outside hitter
19	Lewis	JUPP	Setter / Outside Hitter
20	Samuel	WALKER	Outside hitter

== Notable players ==
- Ben Hardy 2011–2013
- Nicolás Uriarte 2004
- Dave Ferguson 2002–2004, 2012
- Russ Wentworth 2002–2003
- Travis Passier 2013–2016
- Steve Power 1998
- Dave Darcy 1998–2005, 2017–2018
- Vlad Baltovski 2000–2002
- Sam Walker 2017, 2022
- Russell Borgeaud 2010–2013

== Captains ==
- 1998 Steve Power
- 1999 Mark Lebedew
- 2000 Vlad Baltovski
- 2001 Vlad Baltovski
- 2002 Russ Wentworth
- 2003 Jason Craig
- 2004 Jason Craig
- 2005 Phil Eagles
- 2006 Chris Brooke
- 2007 Doug Farrer
- 2008 Doug Farrer
- 2009 Doug Farrer
- 2010 Brad Osborn
- 2011 Brad Osborn
- 2012 Simon Hone
- 2013 Ben Hardy
- 2014 Dan Tyrrell
- 2015 Dan Tyrrell
- 2016 Andre Borgeaud
- 2017 Martin Collins
- 2018 Jordan Power (Asian Club Championships)
- 2018 Andre Borgeaud
- 2019 Andre Borgeaud
- 2020 Andre Borgeaud
- 2021 Andre Borgeaud
- 2022 Andre Borgeaud
- 2023 Andre Borgeaud (Asian Club Championships)

== Coaches ==
- 1998 Steve Power
- 1999 Mark Lebedew
- 2000
- 2001
- 2002 Greg Tompos
- 2003 Greg Tompos
- 2004 Dan Ilott
- 2005 Alexis Lebedew
- 2006 Neil Boyes
- 2007 Neil Boyes
- 2008 Neil Boyes / Nic Kaiser / Les Young
- 2009 Neil Boyes
- 2010 Les Young
- 2011 Les Young
- 2012 Ben Hardy
- 2013 Les Young
- 2014 Les Young
- 2015 Les Young
- 2016 Les Young
- 2017 Les Young
- 2018 Les Young
- 2019 Les Young
- 2020 Les Young / Ben Hardy
- 2021 Ben Hardy
- 2022 Ben Hardy
