= 2018 AVC Women's Challenge Cup =

Asian women's volleyball tournament

Tournament details
- Host country: Hong Kong
- City: Hong Kong
- Dates: 3–9 December (original schedule)
- Teams: 8 (from 1 confederation)
- Venue: 1

The 2018 AVC Women's Challenge Cup was supposed to be the inaugural edition of the AVC Women's Challenge Cup, a biennial international volleyball tournament organised by the Asian Volleyball Confederation (AVC), in that year with the Volleyball Association of Hong Kong, China. But due to unforeseen reasons the tournament was not held.

== Participating teams ==
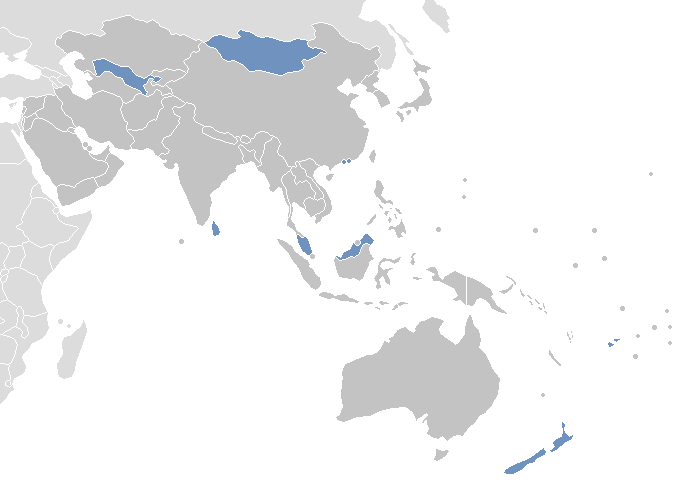
Entrant teams

The tournament was open to AVC member associations ranked 11th and below or that did not participate in the 2017 Asian Women's Volleyball Championship. Priority was given to teams that took part in the championship, then to the highest-ranked non-participating teams. The host could admit up to ten teams.

=== Entrant teams ===
The following teams entered the tournament.

Country	Zone	Notes			
Country	Zone	Notes	Hong Kong	EAZVA	Host, 2017 Asian Championship – 11th place
Mongolia	EAZVA				
Macau	EAZVA				
Uzbekistan	CAZVA				
Sri Lanka	CAZVA	2017 Asian Championship – 13th place			
New Zealand	OZVA	2017 Asian Championship – 12th place			
Fiji	OZVA				
Malaysia	SEAZVA				

== Pools composition ==
The draw results.

Pool A	Pool B
Hong Kong (Hosts)	Mongolia
Uzbekistan	Macau
Sri Lanka	Malaysia
Fiji	New Zealand

== See also ==
- 2018 Asian Women's Volleyball Cup
