= AVC Cup for Women =

International indoor volleyball tournament

- Sport: Volleyball
- Founded: 2008; 18 years ago
- First season: 2008
- Folded: 2022
- No. of teams: 10 (Finals)
- Continent: Asia and Oceania (AVC)
- Last champions: Japan (1st title)
- Most titles: China (5 titles)
- Website: Asian Volleyball Confederation

The AVC Cup for Women, also known as the Asian Women's Volleyball Cup, was an international volleyball competition in Asia and Oceania contested by the top senior women's national teams of the members of Asian Volleyball Confederation (AVC), the sport's continent governing body. The tournaments have been awarded every two years since 2008. The current champion is Japan, which won its first title at the 2022 tournament.

This event should not be confused with the other, more prestigious, continental competition for Asian national volleyball teams, the Asian Volleyball Championship and Asian Volleyball Challenge Cup.

The 7 Asian Cup tournaments have been won by three different national teams. China have won five times. The other Asian Cup winners are Japan and Thailand, with one title each.

== History ==
Originally the tournament was awarded every two years beginning 2008.

In August 2022, beginning next year the biennial tournament will now be done annually according to AVC Control Committee President and Technical Director Dr. Han Joo Eom.

== Results summary ==
Year	Host	Final			3rd place match			Teams
Year	Host	Champions	Score	Runners-up	3rd place	Score	4th place	Teams
2008; Details	(Thailand); Nakhon Ratchasima	China	3–0	South Korea	Thailand	3–2	Japan	8
2010; Details	(China); Taicang	China	3–0	Thailand	South Korea	3–0	Japan	8
2012; Details	(Kazakhstan); Almaty	Thailand	3–1	China	Kazakhstan	3–0	Vietnam	8
2014; Details	(China); Shenzhen	China	3–0	South Korea	Kazakhstan	3–2	Japan	8
2016; Details	(Vietnam); Vĩnh Phúc	China	3–0	Kazakhstan	Thailand	3–0	Japan	8
2018; Details	(Thailand); Nakhon Ratchasima	China	3–0	Japan	Thailand	3–0	Chinese Taipei	10
2020	(Taiwan); Taipei	Cancelled due to COVID-19 pandemic						
2022; Details	(Philippines); Pasig	Japan	3–1	China	Thailand	3–0	Vietnam	9

=== Teams reaching the top four ===
Team	Champions	Runners-up	3rd place	4th place
China	5 (2008, 2010, 2014, 2016, 2018)	2 (2012, 2022)		
Thailand	1 (2012)	1 (2010)	4 (2008, 2016, 2018, 2022)	
Japan	1 (2022)	1 (2018)		4 (2008, 2010, 2014, 2016)
South Korea		2 (2008, 2014)	1 (2010)	
Kazakhstan		1 (2016)	2 (2012, 2014)	
Vietnam				2 (2012, 2022)
Chinese Taipei				1 (2018)

=== Champions by region ===
Federation (Region)	Champion(s)	Number
EAZVA (East Asia)	China (5), Japan (1)	6 titles
SEAZVA (Southeast Asia)	Thailand (1)	1 title

== Hosts ==
List of hosts by number of cups hosted.

Time Hosted	Nations	Year(s)
2	China	2010, 2014
2	Thailand	2008, 2018
1	Kazakhstan	2012
1	Philippines	2022
1	Vietnam	2016

== Medal summary ==
Rank	Nation	Gold	Silver	Bronze	Total
1	China	5	2	0	7
2	Thailand	1	1	4	6
3	Japan	1	1	0	2
4	South Korea	0	2	1	3
5	Kazakhstan	0	1	2	3
Totals (5 entries)		7	7	7	21

== Participating nations ==
Legend

- 1st – Champions
- 2nd – Runners-up
- 3rd – Third place
- 4th – Fourth place
- • – Did not enter / Did not qualify
- – Hosts
- Q – Qualified for forthcoming tournament

Team	(Thailand); 2008 (8)	(China); 2010 (8)	(Kazakhstan); 2012 (8)	(China); 2014 (8)	(Vietnam); 2016 (8)	(Thailand); 2018 (10)	(Philippines); 2022 (9)	Total
Australia	7th	•	•	•	•	7th	8th	3
China	1st	1st	2nd	1st	1st	1st	2nd	7
Chinese Taipei	6th	6th	7th	6th	5th	4th	5th	7
Iran	•	8th	8th	7th	6th	8th	7th	6
Japan	4th	4th	5th	4th	4th	2nd	1st	7
Kazakhstan	•	5th	3rd	3rd	2nd	10th	•	5
Malaysia	8th	•	•	•	•	•	•	1
Philippines	•	•	•	•	•	9th	6th	2
South Korea	2nd	3rd	6th	2nd	8th	6th	9th	7
Thailand	3rd	2nd	1st	5th	3rd	3rd	3rd	7
Vietnam	5th	7th	4th	8th	7th	5th	4th	7

=== Debut of teams ===
Year	Debutants	Total
2008	Australia	8
2008	China	8
2008	Chinese Taipei	8
2008	Japan	8
2008	Malaysia	8
2008	South Korea	8
2008	Thailand	8
2008	Vietnam	8
2010	Iran	2
2010	Kazakhstan	2
2012	None	0
2014	None	0
2016	None	0
2018	Philippines	1
2022	None	0

== Awards ==
Year	Most Valuable Player
2008	(China) Wei Qiuyue
2010	(China) Wang Yimei
2012	(Thailand) Onuma Sittirak
2014	(China) Yan Ni
2016	(China) Li Jing
2018	(China) Liu Yanhan
2022	(Japan) Mika Shibata

Year	Best Setter
2008	(South Korea) Lee Sook-ja
2010	(Thailand) Nootsara Tomkom
2012	(Thailand) Nootsara Tomkom
2014	(China) Ding Xia
2016	(Kazakhstan) Irina Lukomskaya
2018	(China) Sun Haiping
2022	(Thailand) Pornpun Guedpard

Year	Best Outside Spikers
2014	(China) Zhang Changning
2014	(China) Liu Yanhan
2016	(China) Li Jing
2016	(Thailand) Ajcharaporn Kongyot
2018	(Japan) Miwako Osanai
2018	(Thailand) Ajcharaporn Kongyot
2022	(China) Wu Mengjie
2022	(Thailand) Chatchu-on Moksri

Year	Best Middle Blockers
2014	(China) Yan Ni
2014	(South Korea) Yang Hyo-jin
2016	(Kazakhstan) Kristina Anikonova
2016	(China) Yang Zhou
2018	(China) Gao Yi
2018	(Chinese Taipei) Tseng Wan-ling
2022	(Japan) Hiroyo Yamanaka
2022	(China) Hu Mingyuan

Year	Best Opposite Spiker
2014	(South Korea) Kim Yeon-koung
2016	(Kazakhstan) Yekaterina Zhdanova
2018	(Thailand) Pimpichaya Kokram
2022	(China) Zhou Yetong

Year	Best Libero
2008	(Thailand) Wanna Buakaew
2010	(China) Zhang Xian
2012	(Kazakhstan) Marina Storozhenko
2014	(Japan) Miku Torigoe
2016	(Thailand) Piyanut Pannoy
2018	(Japan) Rena Mizusugi
2022	(Japan) Rena Mizusugi

== Former awards ==
Year	Best Scorer
2008	(South Korea) Kim Min-ji
2010	(South Korea) Kim Yeon-koung
2012	(Thailand) Onuma Sittirak

Year	Best Spiker
2008	(China) Wang Yimei
2010	(South Korea) Kim Yeon-koung
2012	(Thailand) Onuma Sittirak

Year	Best Server
2008	(Japan) Nanami Inoue
2010	(Chinese Taipei) Chen Wan-ting
2012	(China) Hui Ruoqi

Year	Best Blocker
2008	(China) Xue Ming
2010	(South Korea) Yang Hyo-jin
2012	(China) Xu Yunli

== See also ==
- AVC Cup for Men
- AVC Women's Volleyball Cup
