= Wang Huimin (volleyball player) =

Chinese volleyball player (born 1992)

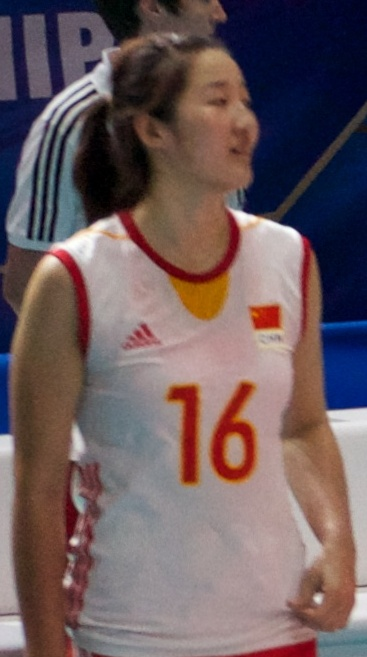
- Wang Huimin in 2014

Personal information
- Full name: Wang Huimin
- Nationality: Chinese
- Born: 11 November 1992 (age 33) Shandong, China
- Home town: Shandong, China
- Height: 1.84 m (6 ft 0 in)
- Weight: 65 kg (143 lb)
- Spike: 305 cm (120 in)
- Block: 298 cm (117 in)

Volleyball information
- Position: Wing Spiker
- Current club: Zhejiang New Century Tourism
- Number: 15

National team
- Years: Team
- 2014, 2017: China
Honours
Women's volleyball
Representing China
World Championship
Silver medal – second place	2014 Italy	Team
Montreux Volley Masters
Bronze medal – third place	2017 Switzerland	Team
- Updated on October 2019

Wang Huimin (Chinese: 汪慧敏; born 11 November 1992 in Shandong) is a Chinese volleyball player.

== Clubs ==
- (China) Zhejiang New Century Tourism
