= Gao Yi (volleyball) =

Chinese volleyball player (born 1998)

Personal information
- Nationality: Chinese
- Born: 22 July 1998 (age 28); Shandong, China
- Hometown: Zaozhuang, Shandong, China
- Height: 1.93 m (6 ft 4 in)
- Weight: 66 kg (146 lb)
- Spike: 304 cm (120 in)
- Block: 298 cm (117 in)

Volleyball information
- Position: Middle Blocker
- Current club: Bayi
- Number: 5

Career
Years	Teams
2016 - 2017; 2017 - present	Beijing; Bayi

National team
2017–2018, 2022-present	China
Honours
Volleyball Nations League
Bronze medal – third place	2018 Nanjing	Team
Asian Cup Championship
Gold medal – first place	2018 Nakhon Ratchasima	Team
U18 World Championship
Bronze medal – third place	2015 Peru	Team
World University Games
Gold medal – first place	2021 Chengdu	Team
Asian Games
Gold medal – first place	2022 Hangzhou	Team

Gao Yi (Chinese: 高意; born 22 July 1998) is a Chinese volleyball player. She participated at the 2018 FIVB Volleyball Women's Nations League. and the 2018 Montreux Volley Masters.

== Clubs ==
- (China) Beijing (2016 - 2017)
- (China) Bayi (2017–present)
