= Yang Zhou =

Chinese volleyball player (born 1992)

Personal information
- Full name: Yang Zhou
- Nationality: Chinese
- Born: 21 April 1992 (age 34) Zhejiang, China
- Home town: Zhejiang, China
- Height: 1.90 m (6 ft 3 in)
- Weight: 73 kg (161 lb)
- Spike: 310 cm (120 in)
- Block: 302 cm (119 in)

Volleyball information
- Position: Middle blocker
- Current club: Zhejiang New Century Tourism
- Number: 4

National team
- Years: Team
- 2013 2011 - present: China U23; China
Honours
Women's volleyball
Representing China
World Cup
| Bronze medal – third place | 2011 Japan | Team |
Women's U23 Volleyball World Championship
| Gold medal – first place | 2013 Mexicali | Team |
Asian Cup Championship
| Gold medal – first place | 2016 Vinh Phuc | Team |
| Gold medal – first place | 2018 Nakhon Ratchasima | Team |
- Updated on September 23, 2018

Yang Zhou (simplified Chinese: 杨舟; traditional Chinese: 楊舟; pinyin: Yáng Zhōu; born 21 April 1992, in Zhejiang) is a female Chinese volleyball player. She won the 2013 FIVB Women's U23 Volleyball World Championship.

== Clubs ==
- (China) Zhejiang New Century Tourism (2009–present)
- (China) Shanghai Bright Ubest (2018) (loaned)

== Awards ==
- 2013 FIVB U23 World Championship "Best Middle Blocker"
