= Li Jing (volleyball) =

Chinese volleyball player (born 1991)

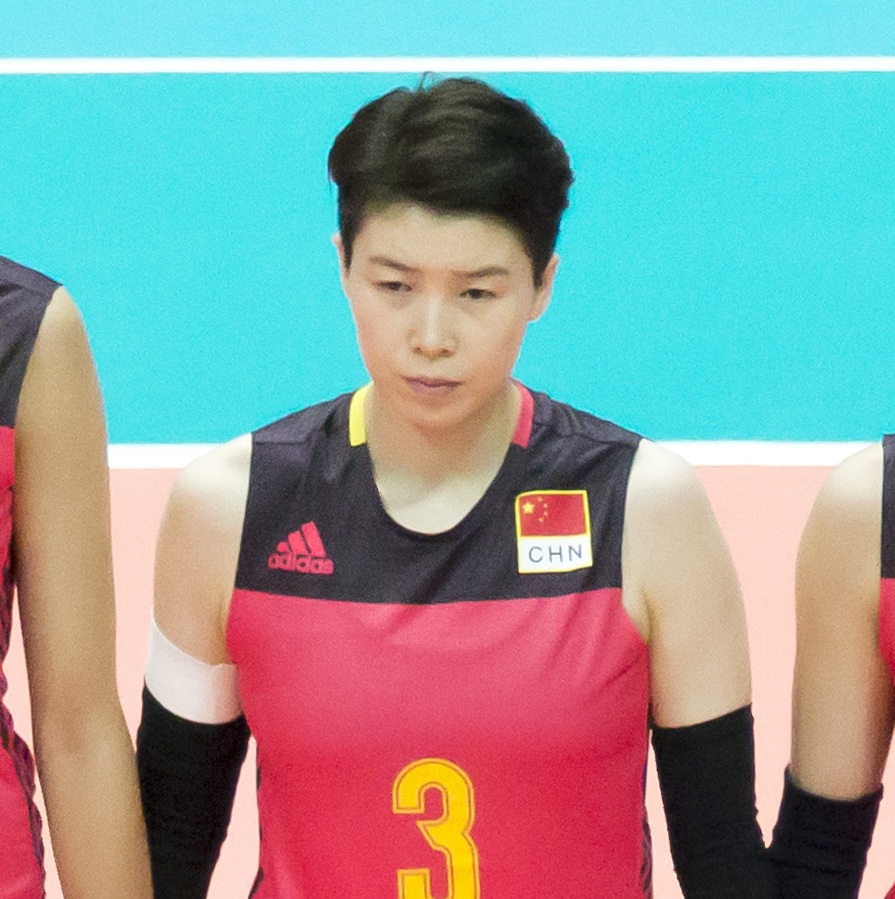

Personal information
- Nickname: Ba Ba Jing (describing her spike style like Barbara Jelić-Ružić)
- Nationality: Chinese
- Born: 9 August 1991 (age 35); Shandong, China
- Hometown: Shandong, China
- Height: 186 cm (73 in)
- Weight: 73 kg (161 lb)
- Spike: 310 cm (122 in)
- Block: 295 cm (116 in)

Career
Years	Teams
2009 - present	Zhejiang

National team
2013 - 2014; 2016 - 2017	China
Honours
Asian Games
Silver medal – second place	2014 Incheon
AVC Cup Championship
Gold medal – first place	2014 Shenzhen
Gold medal – first place	2016 Vinh Phuc
Montreux Volley Masters
Bronze medal – third place	2017 Switzerland	Team

Li Jing (born 9 August 1991) is a Chinese female volleyball player. She is part of the China women's national volleyball team.

She participated in the 2014 FIVB Volleyball World Grand Prix. At club level she played for Zhejiang women's volleyball team in 2014.
