= Les Young =

Leslie (Les) James Bruce Young (born 7 October 1970) has been coaching and administering volleyball clubs since 1989, state volleyball teams since 1997 and national teams since 2001. Les is the Head Coach of the Canberra Heat Men who compete in the Australian Volleyball League, the program director for the Volleyball Australia Junior Men's Development Program and the Program Head Coach for the Australian Youth Boys squad. Some notable coaching roles include Australia's second assistant coach for the 2013 FIVB Volleyball Men's U23 World Championship, head coach for the 2018 Asian Boys' U18 Volleyball Championship and head coach for the 2017 and 2018 Men's AVC Club Volleyball Championship.

== Summary ==
Young has been a coach with the Volleyball Australia Junior Men's Development Program since 2007, and the head coach of the Canberra Heat Men in 2010, 2011 and 2013 - 2016 securing two national championship titles in 2011 and 2915. He has coached Australian Capital Territory (ACT) junior men between 1997 and 2014 securing two national championship titles in 1999 with the Under 21 Men and in 2015 with the Under 23 Men. He was head coach of the Australian Defence Force National Men from 2001 to 2012 securing six national defence championship titles in that time. In addition to his coaching roles, Young has been the Program Director of the Volleyball Australia Junior Men's Development Program since 2013, Vice President of Volleyball ACT from 2008 to 2013, President of Volleyball ACT from 2013 to 2017, the interim Volleyball Australia High Performance Director in 2014 and the interim Volleyball ACT Chief Executive Officer in 2013 and 2016/17. Les is also on the board of Judo Australia.

== International Tournaments ==
Most recently, Young was head coach for Australia at the 2018 Asian Boys' U18 Volleyball Championship in Iran, the 2018 Asian Men's Club Volleyball Championship in Myanmar, and the 2017 Asian Men's Club Volleyball Championship in Vietnam. He also regularly coaches Australia at Thailand's under 21 national men's volleyball championship (2013, 2014 and 2016–2018). In 2012 Young coached Canberra Heat at a Five Test Series against the New Zealand national team in New Zealand. Prior to this Young coached a range of international tournaments with the Australian Defence Force Men's team including the 2005, 2007, 2009, 2011 Arafura Games, the 2006 Scottish Open, the 2002 and 2006 United Kingdom Crown Services Championships, and the 2004 and 2012 New Zealand Combined Services Championships.

== National Tournaments ==
Young has regularly coached at a range of national senior and junior tournaments in Australia since 1997 including Canberra Heat in the Australian Volleyball League in 2010, 2011 and 2013–2017. Other national tournaments include the annual Good Neighbour tournament (men's honours) (2009-2017 Canberra Heat, 1997 National Defence Men), Australian Junior Volleyball Championships (various teams from 1997 to 2014 primarily Under 21 and Under 23 men) and the Australian Combined Services Championships (1998-2010).

== Clubs ==
Young's club coaching career started with the Australian Defence Force Academy Volleyball Club in 1989-1990 then again in 1996, 2005 and 2006. He also coached Jets Volleyball Club in 1997 and 1998. His first national league coaching role was with Canberra Heat (2010, 2011, 2013–2018).
