= Wang Yimei =

Chinese volleyball player (born 1988)

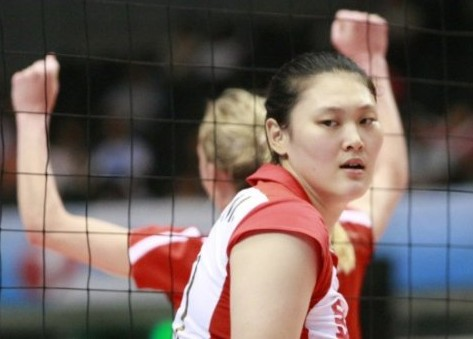

Personal information
- Full name: Wang Yimei
- Nickname: Da Mei
- Nationality: Chinese
- Born: 11 January 1988 (age 38) Dalian, China
- Home town: Dalian, China
- Height: 1.90 m (6 ft 3 in)
- Weight: 87 kg (192 lb)
- Spike: 320 cm (130 in)
- Block: 307 cm (121 in)

Volleyball information
- Position: Wing spiker / Opposite spiker
- Current club: retired

Career
- Years: Team
- 2003–2013 2013–2014 2014–2015 2015–2020: Liaoning; Eczacıbaşı VitrA; İdman Ocağı; Liaoning

National team
- Years: Team
- 2004–2006 2008–2013: China
Honours
Representing China
Olympic Games
Bronze medal – third place	2008 Beijing	Team
FIVB World Cup
Bronze medal – third place	2011 Japan	Team
World Grand Champions Cup
Bronze medal – third place	2005 Japan	Team
FIVB World Grand Prix
Bronze medal – third place	2005 Sendai	Team
Silver medal – second place	2013 Sapporo	Team
Asian Games
Gold medal – first place	2006 Doha	Team
Gold medal – first place	2010 Guangzhou	Team
Asian Championship
Gold medal – first place	2005 Taicang	Team
Gold medal – first place	2011 Taipei	Team
Asian Cup
Gold medal – first place	2008 Nakhon Ratchasima	Team
Gold medal – first place	2010 Tai Cang	Team
Silver medal – second place	2012 Almaty	Team
- Updated on June 2024

Wang Yimei (Chinese: 王一梅; pinyin: Wáng Yīméi; born 11 January 1988 in Dalian, Liaoning) is a retired Chinese volleyball player. She lives in Liaoning Province.

She played her first match for China women's national volleyball team in 2005 and has represented the national side at the Beijing 2008 Summer Olympics, where she was the second leading scorer behind American player Logan Tom, with China winning the bronze medal. She has also represented China at the London 2012 Summer Olympics.

== Awards ==
=== Individual ===
- 2003 Asian Junior Women's Volleyball Championship "Most valuable player"
- 2008 Asian Women's Cup Volleyball Championship "Best Spiker"
- 2008 Montreux Volley Masters "Best Scorer"
- 2010 FIVB World Grand Prix "Best Server"
- 2010 Asian Women's Cup Volleyball Championship "Most Valuable Player"
- 2011 Asian Women's Volleyball Championship "Most Valuable Player"

=== National team ===
- 2005 World Grand Champions Cup - Bronze Medal
- 2005 Montreux Volley Masters - Silver Medal

Awards
Preceded by (Netherlands) Manon Flier	Best Server of FIVB World Grand Prix; 2010	Succeeded by (Brazil) Thaísa Menezes
Preceded by (Thailand) Onuma Sittirak	Most Valuable Player of Asian Championship; 2011	Succeeded by (Thailand) Wilavan Apinyapong
