= Australian Volleyball League =

Men's and women's volleyball competitions in Australia

Australian Volleyball Super League
- Formerly: Australian Volleyball League (1998–2022)
- Sport: Volleyball
- Founded: 1998
- First season: 1998
- Administrator: VA
- No. of teams: 6
- Country: Australia
- Continent: Oceania
- Broadcaster: SBS on Demand
- Level on pyramid: 1
- International cup: AVC Club Volleyball Championship
- Website: http://www.volleyballaustralia.org.au/

The Australian Volleyball Super League (AVSL) is the premier Australian domestic volleyball competition.

== Current clubs ==
The six clubs of the 2024 season:

Locations of the 2020 Australian Volleyball League clubs

Team	Location	Arena	Capacity
Adelaide Storm	Adelaide	Adelaide 36s Arena	
Canberra Heat	Canberra	Lyneham Hockey Centre	
Melbourne Vipers	Melbourne	State Volleyball Centre	
NSW Phoenix	Sydney	Netball Central	
Perth Steel	Perth	Warwick Stadium	
Queensland Pirates	Brisbane	Iona College	

== Champions ==
The complete list of the Australian Volleyball League champions:

=== Men ===
Year	Champions	Score	Runners-up	Third place	Score	Fourth place	Teams
2025; Details	Queensland Pirates	3–1	Perth Steel	Melbourne Vipers	=	NSW Phoenix	6
2024; Details	Queensland Pirates	3–1	Perth Steel	Melbourne Vipers	3–2	Adelaide Storm	6
2023; Details	Perth Steel	3–1	Adelaide Storm	Melbourne Vipers	3–0	Canberra Heat	6
2022; Details	Canberra Heat	3–2	Adelaide Storm	WA Steel	3–1	Queensland Pirates	7
2021	Canceled due to COVID-19 pandemic						
2020	Canceled due to COVID-19 pandemic						
2019; Details	Queensland Pirates	3–2	Canberra Heat	Melbourne Vipers	3–2	UTSSU Shield	6
2018; Details	Queensland Pirates	3–1	Canberra Heat	WA Steel	3–0	Adelaide Storm	12
2017; Details	Queensland Pirates	3–0	WA Hornets	Canberra Heat	3–1	Adelaide Storm	9
2016; Details	Queensland Pirates	3–0	Canberra Heat	VVA Vultures	3–1	Adelaide Storm	9
2015; Details	Canberra Heat	3–0	Queensland Pirates	Adelaide Storm	3–2	WA Hornets	8
2014; Details	Queensland Pirates	3–1	Canberra Heat	WA Hornets	3–2	VVA Vultures	7
2013; Details	Queensland Pirates	3–1	Canberra Heat	AIS	3–1	VVA Vultures	7
2012; Details	AIS	3–2	Queensland Pirates	Volleyball Victoria	3–2	Volleyball NSW	9

=== Women ===
Year	Champions	Score	Runners-up	Third place	Score	Fourth place	Teams
2025; Details	Perth Steel	3–2	Adelaide Storm	NSW Phoenix	=	Queensland Pirates	6
2024; Details	Queensland Pirates	3–1	Adelaide Storm	Perth Steel	3–2	Melbourne Vipers	6
2023; Details	Perth Steel	3–1	Queensland Pirates	Melbourne Vipers	3–1	Adelaide Storm	6
2022; Details	Queensland Pirates	3–2	WA Steel	Melbourne Vipers	3–1	Adelaide Storm	7
2021	Canceled due to COVID-19 pandemic						
2020	Canceled due to COVID-19 pandemic						
2019; Details	Melbourne Vipers	3–2	Queensland Pirates	Adelaide Storm	3–2	Canberra Heat	6
2018; Details	Melbourne University Blues	3–0	VA Centre of Excellence	Canberra Heat	3–2	WA Steel	11
2017; Details	Melbourne University Blues	3–0	WA Pearls	Queensland Pirates	3–2	Sydney Amazons	9
2016; Details	Melbourne University Blues	3–0	Queensland Pirates	Sydney Amazons	3–0	WA Pearls	9
2015; Details	Melbourne University Blues	3–2	UTSSU Shield	VVA Vultures	3–0	Canberra Heat	8
2014; Details	Melbourne University Blues	3–2	UTSSU Shield	Queensland Pirates	3–0	Adelaide Storm	6
2013; Details	Melbourne University Blues	3–1	WA Pearls	VVA Vultures	3–0	Queensland Pirates	6
2012; Details	Queensland Pirates	3-1	VVA Vultures	WA Pearls	?–?	Adelaide Storm	7
2011; Details	WA Pearls	3–0	Adelaide Storm	Melbourne University Blues	3–1	UTSSU Shield	5

== See also ==
- Volleyball Australia
