= 2008 Asian Women's Volleyball Cup =

International indoor volleyball tournament

Tournament details
- Host country: Thailand
- City: Nakhon Ratchasima
- Dates: 1–7 October
- Teams: 8 (from 1 confederation)
- Venue: 1 (in 1 host city)

Final positions
- Champions: China (1st title)
- Runners-up: South Korea
- Third place: Thailand
- Fourth place: Japan

Tournament awards
- MVP: (China) Wei Qiuyue

The 2008 Asian Women's Volleyball Cup, so-called 2008 AVC Cup for Women was the inaugural edition of the Asian Cup, a biennial international volleyball tournament organised by the Asian Volleyball Confederation (AVC) with Thailand Volleyball Association (TVA). The tournament was held in MCC Hall Convention Center The Mall Nakhon Ratchasima Shopping Mall, Thailand from 1 to 7 October.

The top 2 teams qualified for the 2009 FIVB World Grand Prix.

== Pools composition ==
The teams are seeded based on their final ranking at the 2007 Asian Women's Volleyball Championship.

Pool A	Pool B
Thailand (Host & 3rd); South Korea (4th); Chinese Taipei; Vietnam	Japan (1st); China (2nd); ~~Kazakhstan~~ * Australia

* Kazakhstan withdrew and replaced by Malaysia.

== Preliminary round ==
=== Pool A ===
Pos	Team	Pld	W	L	Pts	SW	SL	SR	SPW	SPL	SPR	Qualification
1	South Korea	3	3	0	6	9	3	3.000	275	227	1.211	Quarterfinals
2	Thailand	3	2	1	5	8	3	2.667	253	203	1.246	Quarterfinals
3	Vietnam	3	1	2	4	4	8	0.500	232	273	0.850	Quarterfinals
4	Chinese Taipei	3	0	3	3	2	9	0.222	207	264	0.784	Quarterfinals

Date	Time		Score		Set 1	Set 2	Set 3	Set 4	Set 5	Total
01 Oct	11:00	Vietnam	3–2	Chinese Taipei	25–17	21–25	28–30	25–19	15–13	114–104
01 Oct	16:00	Thailand	2–3	South Korea	25–18	19–25	25–21	25–27	9–15	103–106
02 Oct	11:00	Chinese Taipei	0–3	South Korea	15–25	20–25	16–25			51–75
02 Oct	16:00	Vietnam	0–3	Thailand	17–25	12–25	16–25			45–75
03 Oct	11:00	South Korea	3–1	Vietnam	19–25	25–15	25–15	25–18		94–73
03 Oct	16:00	Thailand	3–0	Chinese Taipei	25–15	25–19	25–18			75–52

=== Pool B ===
Pos	Team	Pld	W	L	Pts	SW	SL	SR	SPW	SPL	SPR	Qualification
1	China	3	3	0	6	9	0	MAX	225	103	2.184	Quarterfinals
2	Japan	3	2	1	5	6	3	2.000	194	126	1.540	Quarterfinals
3	Australia	3	1	2	4	3	6	0.500	143	204	0.701	Quarterfinals
4	Malaysia	3	0	3	3	0	9	0.000	96	225	0.427	Quarterfinals

Date	Time		Score		Set 1	Set 2	Set 3	Set 4	Set 5	Total
01 Oct	13:00	China	3–0	Malaysia	25–11	25–7	25–7			75–25
01 Oct	18:00	Australia	0–3	Japan	15–25	7–25	12–25			34–75
02 Oct	13:00	China	3–0	Australia	25–12	25–13	25–9			75–34
02 Oct	18:00	Malaysia	0–3	Japan	3–25	4–25	10–25			17–75
03 Oct	13:00	Japan	0–3	China	9–25	22–25	13–25			44–75
03 Oct	18:00	Australia	3–0	Malaysia	25–11	25–21	25–22			75–54

== Final round ==
Quarterfinals
5 October – Nakhon Ratchasima
South Korea	3
Malaysia	0
5 October – Nakhon Ratchasima
Japan	3
Vietnam	0
5 October – Nakhon Ratchasima
China	3
Chinese Taipei	0
5 October – Nakhon Ratchasima
Thailand	3
Australia	0

Semifinals
6 October – Nakhon Ratchasima
South Korea	3
Japan	0
6 October – Nakhon Ratchasima
China	3
Thailand	0

Final
7 October – Nakhon Ratchasima
South Korea	0
China	3
3rd place
7 October – Nakhon Ratchasima
Japan	2
Thailand	3

5th–8th places
6 October – Nakhon Ratchasima
Malaysia	0
Vietnam	3
6 October – Nakhon Ratchasima
Chinese Taipei	3
Australia	1

5th place
7 October – Nakhon Ratchasima
Vietnam	3
Chinese Taipei	0
7th place
7 October – Nakhon Ratchasima
Malaysia	0
Australia	3

=== Quarterfinals ===
Date	Time		Score		Set 1	Set 2	Set 3	Set 4	Set 5	Total
05 Oct	11:00	South Korea	3–0	Malaysia	25–14	25–12	25–7			75–33
05 Oct	13:00	China	3–0	Chinese Taipei	25–17	25–13	25–15			75–45
05 Oct	16:00	Thailand	3–0	Australia	25–14	25–14	25–17			75–45
05 Oct	18:00	Japan	3–0	Vietnam	25–11	25–21	25–23			75–55

=== 5th–8th semifinals ===
Date	Time		Score		Set 1	Set 2	Set 3	Set 4	Set 5	Total
06 Oct	11:00	Malaysia	0–3	Vietnam	13–25	7–25	11–25			31–75
06 Oct	13:00	Chinese Taipei	3–1	Australia	25–16	19–25	25–20	25–13		94–74

=== Semifinals ===
Date	Time		Score		Set 1	Set 2	Set 3	Set 4	Set 5	Total
06 Oct	16:00	South Korea	3–0	Japan	25–13	25–11	26–24			76–48
06 Oct	18:00	China	3–0	Thailand	25–18	25–23	25–14			75–55

=== 7th place ===
Date	Time		Score		Set 1	Set 2	Set 3	Set 4	Set 5	Total
07 Oct	11:00	Malaysia	0–3	Australia	21–25	15–25	17–25			53–75

=== 5th place ===
Date	Time		Score		Set 1	Set 2	Set 3	Set 4	Set 5	Total
07 Oct	13:00	Vietnam	3–0	Chinese Taipei	25–15	25–15	25–18			75–48

=== 3rd place ===
Date	Time		Score		Set 1	Set 2	Set 3	Set 4	Set 5	Total
07 Oct	16:00	Japan	2–3	Thailand	26–28	25–23	25–18	21–25	7–15	104–109

=== Final ===
Date	Time		Score		Set 1	Set 2	Set 3	Set 4	Set 5	Total
07 Oct	18:00	South Korea	0–3	China	17–25	19–25	18–25			54–75

== Final standing ==
Rank	Team
1st place, gold medalist(s)	China
2nd place, silver medalist(s)	South Korea
3rd place, bronze medalist(s)	Thailand
4	Japan
5	Vietnam
6	Chinese Taipei
7	Australia
8	Malaysia

Qualified for the 2009 World Grand Prix

2008 Asian Women's Cup champions

China
1st title

== Awards ==
- MVP: (China) Wei Qiuyue
- Best scorer: (South Korea) Kim Min-ji
- Best spiker: (China) Wang Yimei
- Best blocker: (China) Xue Ming
- Best server: (Japan) Nanami Inoue
- Best setter: (South Korea) Lee Sook-ja
- Best libero: (Thailand) Wanna Buakaew

== See also ==
- 2008 Asian Men's Volleyball Cup
