= Zhejiang women's volleyball team =

Chinese women's volleyball team

Zhejiang Jiaxing Xitang Ancient Town Women's Volleyball Club
- Full name: Zhejiang Jiaxing Xitang Ancient Town Women's Volleyball Club 江蘇嘉善西塘古鎮排球俱樂部
- Short name: Zhejiang 浙江女排
- Founded: 1958
- Ground: Jiashan County Stadium (Capacity: 3100)
- Manager: (China) Wu Sheng
- Captain: Wang Na
- League: Chinese Volleyball League
- 2017-18: 6th ▼4

Uniforms
Home	Away

Zhejiang Women's Volleyball Club is a women's volleyball team in China, which based in Zhejiang. The club currently is one of the team of Chinese Volleyball League. The team won one champion title in 2013/14. It was sponsored by Jiashan Rural Commercial Bank.

== CVL results ==
Season	Final ranking
2018-2019	11th
2017-2018	6th
2016-2017	Runner-up
2015-2016	6th
2014-2015	4th
2013-2014	Champions
2012-2013	Third Place
2011-2012	7th
2010-2011	4th
2009-2010	5th
2008-2009	4th
2007-2008	8th
2006-2007	6th
2005-2006	4th
2004-2005	Third Place
2003-2004	6th
2002-2003	5th
2001-2002	8th
2000-2001	5th
1999-2000	5th
1998-1999	Runner-up
1997-1998	Third Place
1996-1997	Third Place

== Team roster ==
=== 2018 FIVB Volleyball Women's Club World Championship ===
- Head coach: (China) Wang Hebin

No.	Name	Date of birth	Height	Weight	Spike	Block
1	(China) Yang Hanyu	12 October 1999	1.92 m (6 ft 4 in)	72 kg (159 lb)	317 cm (125 in)	311 cm (122 in)
2	(China) Yu Shiyu	25 March 1999	1.89 m (6 ft 2 in)	68 kg (150 lb)	310 cm (120 in)	300 cm (120 in)
3	(China) Jiang Yuxiao	24 July 1993	1.80 m (5 ft 11 in)	67 kg (148 lb)	305 cm (120 in)	298 cm (117 in)
4	(China) Wang Na (C)	25 February 1990	1.78 m (5 ft 10 in)	63 kg (139 lb)	305 cm (120 in)	295 cm (116 in)
5	(China) Li Ying	14 January 1995	1.93 m (6 ft 4 in)	68 kg (150 lb)	308 cm (121 in)	300 cm (120 in)
6	(China) Zhu Yuezhou	27 March 1995	1.87 m (6 ft 2 in)	70 kg (150 lb)	306 cm (120 in)	296 cm (117 in)
7	(China) Lan Jiali	22 August 1998	1.77 m (5 ft 10 in)	62 kg (137 lb)	302 cm (119 in)	296 cm (117 in)
9	(China) Liu Yanhan	19 January 1993	1.88 m (6 ft 2 in)	75 kg (165 lb)	315 cm (124 in)	305 cm (120 in)
10	(China) Ren Kaiyi	14 December 1991	1.82 m (6 ft 0 in)	71 kg (157 lb)	305 cm (120 in)	295 cm (116 in)
13	(China) Liu Yu	13 May 2001	1.90 m (6 ft 3 in)	65 kg (143 lb)	307 cm (121 in)	300 cm (120 in)
14	(China) Wang Mengjie (L)	14 November 1995	1.72 m (5 ft 8 in)	65 kg (143 lb)	289 cm (114 in)	280 cm (110 in)
15	(China) Wang Huimin (L)	11 November 1992	1.84 m (6 ft 0 in)	67 kg (148 lb)	304 cm (120 in)	295 cm (116 in)
16	(China) Wang Mengyue	20 August 1998	1.88 m (6 ft 2 in)	90 kg (200 lb)	306 cm (120 in)	297 cm (117 in)
17	(China) Shen Jiarong	4 November 2000	1.80 m (5 ft 11 in)	60 kg (130 lb)	302 cm (119 in)	290 cm (110 in)

== Team members 2011–2012 ==
Number	Player	Position	Height (m)	Birth date
1	(China) Zhao Xiyu	Spiker	1.88	20/08/1995
2	(China) Wang Xianfen	Middle Blocker	1.88	22/04/1989
3	(China) Jiang Yuxiao	Spiker	1.79	24/07/1993
4	(China) Wang Na (c)	Setter	1.80	25/02/1990
5	(China) Luo Yu	Middle Blocker	1.92	27/02/1987
6	(China) Zhou Suhong	Opposite	1.82	23/04/1979
7	(China) Shan Danna	Libero	1.68	08/10/1991
8	(China) Li Jing	Spiker	1.86	09/08/1991
9	(China) Jin Yan	Setter	1.86	08/01/1993
10	(China) Sun Jizhao	Libero	1.68	16/07/1987
11	(China) Qiu Yanan	Opposite	1.83	16/01/1989
12	(China) Yang Zhou	Middle Blocker	1.88	21/04/1992
13	(China) Hu Yaoyao	Middle Blocker	1.86	10/03/1995
14	(China) Zhu Lijun	Opposite	1.82	11/05/1985
15	(China) Wang Huimin	Opposite	1.84	11/11/1992
16	(China) Ye Cen	Middle Blocker	1.79	15/08/1991
17	(China) Shen Lizhen	Spiker	1.89	28/02/1997
18	(China) Bao Yunyun	Spiker	1.84	26/12/1991

== Team members 2013–2014 ==
Number	Player	Position	Height (m)	Birth date
1	(China) Zhao Xiyu	Spiker	1.88	20 Aug 1995
2	(China) Wang Xianfen	Middle Blocker	1.87	22 Apr 1989
3	(China) Jiang Yuxiao	Spiker	1.74	24 Jul 1993
4	(China) Wang Na (c)	Setter	1.78	25 Feb 1990
5	(China) Li Ying	Middle Blocker	1.93	14 Jan 1995
6	(China) Zhu Yuezhou	Opposite	1.87	27 Mar 1995
7	(China) Shan Danna	Libero	1.68	8 Oct 1991
8	(China) Li Jing	Spiker	1.86	9 Aug 1991
9	(China) Jin Yan	Setter	1.86	8 Jan 1993
10	(China) Xie Yulu	Middle Blocker	1.85	29 Aug 1998
11	(China) Qiu Yanan	Opposite	1.83	16 Jan 1989
12	(China) Yang Zhou	Middle Blocker	1.88	21 Apr 1992
13	(China) Fu Xiaoyu	Spiker	1.83	19 Mar 1997
14	(China) Yang Yanyu	Spiker	1.85	15 Mar 1998
15	(China) Wang Huimin	Opposite	1.84	11 Nov 1992
16	(China) Jin Zhaoyang	Spiker	1.95	20 Jul 1995
17	(China) Fan Jianqing	Spiker	1.89	4 Feb 1995
18	(China) Bao Yunyun	Spiker	1.84	26 Dec 1991

== Former players ==
- (China) Yin Yin
- (China) Luo Yu
- (China) Zhou Suhong
- (China) Sun Jizhao
- (China) Zhu Lijun
- (China) Ye Cen

== Honors ==
Asian Women's Club Volleyball Championship

Third place - 2000, 2015
