= Qiu Yanan =

Chinese volleyball player (born 1989)

Personal information
- Nationality: Chinese
- Born: 16 January 1989 (age 37); Henan, China
- Hometown: Wenzhou, China
- Height: 183 cm (72 in)
- Weight: 62 kg (137 lb)
- Spike: 295 cm (116 in)
- Block: 280 cm (110 in)

Volleyball information
- Position: Outside hitter (2005 - 2009); Opposite Hitter (2009 - present)
- Current club: Zhejiang New Century Tourism
- Number: 11

Career
Years	Teams
2005 - present	Zhejiang

National team
2011	China
- Last updated: December 2017

Qiu Yanan (born 16 January 1989) is a Chinese female volleyball player. She was part of the China women's national volleyball team.

She participated in the 2012 FIVB Volleyball World Grand Prix.
