= Nichika Yamada =

Japanese volleyball player (born 2000)

Personal information
- Nationality: Japanese
- Born: 24 February 2000 (age 26) Aichi, Japan
- Height: 1.86 m (6 ft 1 in)
- Weight: 73 kg (161 lb)
- Spike: 288 cm (113 in)
- Block: 310 cm (122 in)

Volleyball information
- Position: Middle Blocker
- Current club: (Japan) NEC Red Rockets Kawasaki
- Number: 11 (national); 1 (club)

Career
- Years: Team
- 2015–2018: (Japan) Toyohashi Central High School
- 2018–present: (Japan) NEC Red Rockets Kawasaki

National team
- Years: Team
- 2019: U-20 national team
- 2020–present: Senior national team
Honours
Women's volleyball
Representing Japan
AVC Continental Championship
Gold medal – first place	2019 Seoul	Team
Bronze medal – third place	2026 Tianjin	Team
FIVB Nations League
Silver medal – second place	2024 Bangkok	Team

Nichika Yamada (山田 二千華, Yamada Nichika; born 24 February 2000) is a Japanese volleyball player. She plays for the Japan women's national volleyball team. She competed at the 2020 Summer Olympics, in Women's volleyball.

== Career ==
She participated in the 2017 FIVB Volleyball Girls' U18 World Championship, 2018 Asian Women's Club Volleyball Championship, 2019 FIVB Volleyball Women's U20 World Championship, 2019 Asian Women's Volleyball Championship, and 2021 FIVB Volleyball Women's Nations League.

She plays for NEC Red Rockets.
