= Australia women's national volleyball team =

Women's national volleyball team representing Australia

Australia
- Association: AVF
- Confederation: AVC
- Head coach: Russ Borgeaud
- FIVB ranking: 85 ▼9 (2 October 2026)

Uniforms
Home	Away
- http://avf.org.au/

The Australia women's national volleyball team, also known as Volleyball Team Australia Women (VTAW) or the Volleyroos, is the national volleyball team of the volleyball playing nation of Australia. As of June 2025, they are ranked 63rd in the world. They are a member of the Asian Volleyball Confederation (AVC).

The Australian Women’s program maintained during the 1990s ranked 6th in the Asian zone, due in part to the strong nature of women’s volleyball in Asia, with teams like China, Japan and Korea ranked in the world at the time in the top 8. With the support of the Australian Institute of Sport (AIS), they achieved 9th place in the 2000 Summer Olympics. Following this the Volleyroos achieved its highest-ever world ranking of 14th. They then achieved a 6th-place finish at the 2001 Asian Championships, and qualified for a second World Championships.

Their historic inclusion in the 2014 Women’s Grand Prix challenged the Volleyroos skills with higher world ranked competitors.

== Tournament history ==
A red box around the year indicates tournaments played within Australia

=== Olympic Games ===
The women's Volleyroos made their Olympic Games debut as host sport nation at the 2000 Summer Olympics. They have yet to return to Olympic competition.

=== World Championships ===
Australia have participated twice internationally: and 2002.

1982 World Championship (Peru) – Finishing 12th out of 23 teams. 2002 World Championship (Germany) – Finishing 21st out of 24 teams.

=== Challenger Cup ===
- (Peru) 2018 — 5th place

=== Asian Championships ===
The first Asian Volleyball Championship was held in Melbourne, 1975, where Australia placed 4th. They came 4th again in 1979. These were the best placings in this competition. The team has always placed within the top 10 throughout its history in this tournament.

=== Asian Cup ===
- (Thailand) 2008 — 7th place
- (China) 2010 — Did not participate
- (Kazakhstan) 2012 — Did not participate
- (China) 2014 — Did not participate
- (Vietnam) 2016 — Did not participate
- (Thailand) 2018 — 7th place
- (Taiwan) 2020 — Cancelled due to COVID-19 pandemic
- (Philippines) 2022 — 8th place

=== Asian Nations Cup ===
- (Thailand) 2022 — Did not participate
- (Indonesia) 2023 — 6th place
- (Philippines) 2024 — 4th place
- (Vietnam) 2025 — 7th place
- (Philippines) 2026 — 6th place

=== Oceania Championship ===
- (Guam) 2026 – (gold) Champions

=== World Grand Prix ===
Australia played in the 2016 FIVB Volleyball World Grand Prix, one of 28 participating countries. They were in Group 3, featuring Cuba, Algeria, Peru, Croatia, Kazakhstan, Colombia, and Mexico.

Results table below. The first 3 matches were played in Bendigo, Victoria, and the last 3 matches played in Cali, Colombia.

Match	Home team		Away team
1	Australia	0–3	Colombia
2	Australia	1–3	Cuba
3	Australia	0–3	Croatia
4	Kazakhstan	3–0	Australia
5	Colombia	3–0	Australia
6	Mexico	N/A	Australia

==== Pool B3 ====
- Venue: Bendigo Stadium, Bendigo, Australia

Date	Time		Score		Set 1	Set 2	Set 3	Set 4	Set 5	Total	Report
3 Jun	10:40	Australia	0–3	Colombia	17–25	13–25	13–25			43–75	P2 P3
4 Jun	09:10	Australia	1–3	Cuba	22–25	25–23	18-25	25–27		90–75	P2 P3
5 Jun	06:10	Australia	0–3	Croatia	19–25	17–25	12–25			48–75	P2 P3

==== Pool C3 ====
- Venue: Coliseo Evangelista Mora, Cali, Colombia

Date	Time		Score		Set 1	Set 2	Set 3	Set 4	Set 5	Total	Report
10 Jun	22:00	Kazakhstan	3–0	Australia	25–14	25–6	25–20			75–40	P2 P3
11 Jun	23:30	Colombia	3–0	Australia	25–17	25–20	25–15			75–52	P2 P3
12 Jun	21:00	Mexico	–	Australia	–	–	–			0–0	P2 P3

== Team ==
=== Current roster ===
The following is the Australian Volleyroos Women roster for 2026.

No.	Name	Date of birth	Pos.	Height (cm)	Spike (cm)	2025–26 club
3	Mikaela Stevens	1998-07-11	S	178	295	(Australia) NSW Phoenix
4	Mali Towers	2005-10-28	L	174	Unkwn.	(United States) Dodge City CC
5	Jaiha Birkett	2002-04-27	MB	188	309	(Australia) Canberra Heat Volleyball Club
7	Alexia (Lexi) Zammit	2004-11-06	S	176	Unkwn.	(United States) Cal Poly Pomona Univ.
8	Caitlin O'Dea	1998-09-03	OH	183	312	N/A
10	Chloe Walker	2005-02-13	MB	191	305	(Greece) AO Markópoulo Revoil
11	Jesse Mann	2004-02-09	OH	183	Unkwn.	N/A
13	Lilyana Stanojevic	2006-04-18	OH	178	Unkwn.	N/A
15	Kayla Cantrill	2005-08-02	OH	188	303	(United States) Dodge City CC
16	Anni Tang	2008-02-22	MB	196	312	(Australia) NSW Phoenix
17	Georgina (Georgie) Vanloo	2005-06-25	OH	174	273	N/A
19	Chelsea Cocks	2007-09-20	MB	186	307	(Australia) NSW Phoenix
20	Cameron (Cameroon) Zajer	2006-02-27	OH	183	300	(United States) Salt Lake CC
23	Rachel Linskey	Unkwn.	OP	186	305	(Australia) Canberra Heat Volleyball Club
24	Joclyn Warner	Unkwn.	L	Unkwn.	Unkwn.	N/A
26	Ella Schabort	2005-05-25	OH	188	Unkwn.	(United States) San Diego State Univ.
27	Sophia Soderberg	2004-07-24	L	Unkwn.	Unkwn.	N/A
29	Lana Hollway	2006-05-10	MB	188	295	(United States) Salt Lake CC
30	Halle Rillie	2007-07-19	S	180	Unkwn.	(Australia) Canberra Heat Volleyball Club
32	Chelsea Durbridge	2006-03-27	S	182	300	(United States) Dodge City CC
33	Ella Milne	2004-09-20	OP	189	305	(Canada) Saskatchewan Univ.
34	Lara Marić	2007-05-05	OP	194	302	(United States) Nebraska Omaha Univ.
35	Arwen Verdnik	2001-10-08	OP	179	302	(Australia) Melbourne Vipers
35	Ruby Wright	Unkwn.	MB	Unkwn.	Unkwn.	N/A
36	Gemma McNamara	2006-02-06	L	178	278	(United States) Casper College

=== Staff ===
The following is the Australian Volleyroos Women Staff roster for 2026.

Position	Name
Head Coach	Russ Borgeaud
Assistant Coach	Nicole Hannan
Assistant Coach	Angelia Gaviglio
Assistant Coach	Shane van Beest
