= 2000 FIVB Women's World Olympic Qualification Tournament =

The 2000 FIVB Women's World Olympic Qualification Tournament was played by eight countries to determine the last four competing teams for the 2000 Summer Olympics in Sydney, Australia. The tournament was held in Tokyo, Japan from June 17 to June 25, 2000. The top-four teams advance to the Olympic Games with one berth guaranteed for an Asian country.

== Teams ==
- Argentina
- Canada
- China
- Croatia
- Italy
- Japan
- Netherlands
- South Korea

== Round robin ==
- Saturday 2000-06-17

Italy	3–2	Netherlands	(22-25 19-25 25-19 25-23 15-4)
South Korea	3–0	Croatia	(25-16 25-18 25-20)
China	3–0	Canada	(25-18 25-13 25-13)
Japan	3–1	Argentina	(30-32 25-17 25-22 25-14)

- Sunday 2000-06-18

Netherlands	3–0	China	(25-22 25-20 25-20)
Italy	3–0	South Korea	(25-10 26-24 28-26)
Croatia	3–0	Argentina	(25-19 25-15 25-12)
Japan	3–0	Canada	(25-18 25-16 25-15)

- Monday 2000-06-19

Argentina	0–3	South Korea	(20-25 18-25 20-25)
Italy	3–1	China	(32-30 23-25 25-19 25-19)
Canada	0–3	Croatia	(21-25 18-25 20-25)
Japan	3–1	Netherlands	(18-25 25-21 25-22 25-20)

- Wednesday 2000-06-21

Argentina	0–3	Italy	(21-25 22-25 18-25)
Croatia	3–2	Netherlands	(16-25 25-18 20-25 25-22 15-10)
South Korea	3–0	Canada	(25-15 25-18 25-17)
China	3–1	Japan	(23-25 31-29 25-17 25-20)

- Thursday 2000-06-22

Argentina	3–2	Canada	(25-20 28-30 25-22 22-25 15-13)
China	3–2	Croatia	(23-25 25-16 21-25 25-19 15-10)
Netherlands	1–3	South Korea	(19-25 22-25 25-16 20-25)
Italy	3–0	Japan	(25-22 25-19 25-13)

- Saturday 2000-06-24

Italy	3–0	Canada	(25-12 25-19 25-16)
China	3–2	South Korea	(25-21 18-25 23-25 25-18 15-7)
Netherlands	3–1	Argentina	(26-28 25-22 25-23 25-18)
Croatia	3–2	Japan	(26-28 23-25 25-20 28-26 15-9)

- Sunday 2000-06-25

Argentina	0–3	China	(17-25 11-25 17-25)
Netherlands	3–0	Canada	(25-17 25-20 26-24)
Croatia	3–1	Italy	(19-25 25-22 25-21 25-22)
South Korea	3–1	Japan	(21-25 25-12 25-18 25-23)

== Final ranking ==
Rk	Team	Points	Won	Lost	SW	SL	Ratio	PW	PL	Ratio
1	Italy	13	6	1	19	6	3.166			1.198
2	South Korea	12	5	2	17	8	2.125			1.092
3	Croatia	12	5	2	17	11	1.545			1.041
4	China	12	5	2	16	11	1.454			1.132
5	Netherlands	10	3	4	15	13	1.154			1.028
6	Japan	10	3	4	13	14	0.928			0.998
7	Argentina	8	1	6	5	20	0.250			0.813
8	Canada	7	0	7	2	21	0.095			0.742

- South Korea is counted as The Asian Continental Qualification Tournament Champion since it is the best Asian team except the winner.
- It was the first time Japan did not qualify to the Olympics since volleyball became official at the 1964 Summer Olympics in Tokyo.

== Awards ==
- Best scorer:
  - Barbara Jelic (CRO)
- Best spiker:
  - Yongmei Wu (CHN)
- Best blocker:
  - Antonella Bragaglia (ITA)
- Best server:
  - Yue Sun (CHN)
- Best digger:
  - Soo-Jeong Park (KOR)
- Best setter:
  - Riette Fledderus (NED)
- Best receiver:
  - Ikumi Ogake (JPN)
