= 2018 AVC Cup for Women =

International indoor volleyball tournament

2018 Asian Women's Volleyball Cup

Tournament details
- Host country: Thailand
- City: Nakhon Ratchasima
- Dates: 16–23 September
- Teams: 10 (from 1 confederation)
- Venue: 1 (in 1 host city)

Final positions
- Champions: China (5th title)
- Runners-up: Japan
- Third place: Thailand
- Fourth place: Chinese Taipei

Tournament awards
- MVP: (China) Liu Yanhan

The 2018 Asian Women's Volleyball Cup, so-called 2018 AVC Cup for Women was the sixth edition of the Asian Cup, a biennial international volleyball tournament organised by the Asian Volleyball Confederation (AVC) with Thailand Volleyball Association (TVA). The tournament was held in Nakhon Ratchasima, Thailand from 16 to 23 September 2018.

As hosts, Thailand automatically qualified for the tournament, while the remaining 9 teams, qualified from the 2017 Asian Women's Volleyball Championship in Biñan and Muntinlupa, Philippines.

== Qualification ==
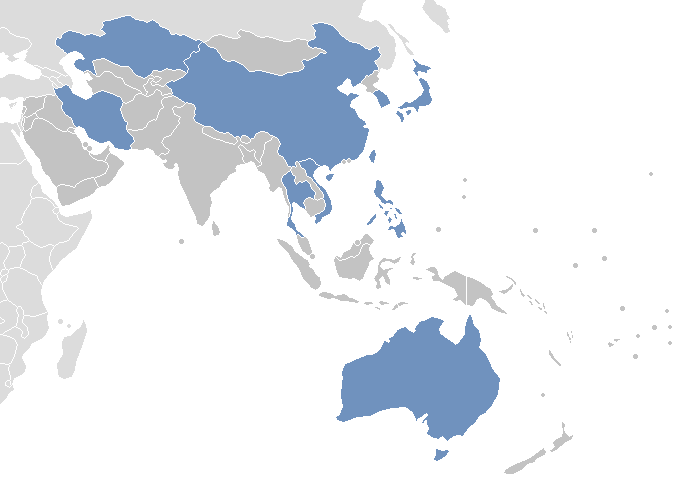
Qualified

The ten AVC member associations participated in the tournament with Thailand already qualified as host country, and the nine remaining teams qualified from the 2017 Asian Women's Volleyball Championship. The ten AVC member associations were from three zonal associations, including, Central Asia (2 teams), East Asia (4 teams), Oceania (1 team) and Southeast Asia (3 teams). While any West Asian teams did not participate the tournament's qualification.

=== Qualified teams ===
The following teams qualified for the tournament.

Means of qualification	Berths	Qualified
Host country	1	Thailand
Central Asian teams	2	Iran
Central Asian teams	2	Kazakhstan
East Asian teams	4	China
East Asian teams	4	Chinese Taipei
East Asian teams	4	Japan
East Asian teams	4	South Korea
Oceanian team	1	Australia
Southeast Asian teams	2	Philippines
Southeast Asian teams	2	Vietnam
Total 10

== Pools composition ==
Pool A	Pool B	Pool C
Thailand (Host)	China (4)	Kazakhstan (7)
Japan (1)	Vietnam (5)	Philippines (8)
South Korea (3)	Chinese Taipei (6)	Iran (9)
		Australia (10)

== Venue ==
All matches will be held at Korat Chatchai Hall, Nakhon Ratchasima.

== Preliminary round ==
=== Pool standing procedure ===
1. Number of matches won
2. Match points
3. Sets ratio
4. Points ratio
5. Result of the last match between the tied teams

Match won 3–0 or 3–1: 3 match points for the winner, 0 match points for the loser
Match won 3–2: 2 match points for the winner, 1 match point for the loser

=== Pool A ===
Pos	Team	Pld	W	L	Pts	SW	SL	SR	SPW	SPL	SPR	Qualification
1	Thailand	2	2	0	6	6	1	6.000	176	147	1.197	Quarterfinals
2	South Korea	2	1	1	3	3	4	0.750	154	168	0.917	Quarterfinals
3	Japan	2	0	2	0	2	6	0.333	186	201	0.925	Quarterfinals

Rules for classification: Pool standing procedure

16 September; 18:30	Japan	1–3	South Korea	Korat Chatchai Hall, Nakhon Ratchasima
16 September; 18:30	(25–21, 18–25, 27–29, 23–25); P2 Report			Korat Chatchai Hall, Nakhon Ratchasima

17 September; 18:30	Thailand	3–1	Japan	Korat Chatchai Hall, Nakhon Ratchasima
17 September; 18:30	(28–26, 21–25, 27–25, 25–17); P2 Report			Korat Chatchai Hall, Nakhon Ratchasima

18 September; 18:30	South Korea	0–3	Thailand	Korat Chatchai Hall, Nakhon Ratchasima
18 September; 18:30	(18–25, 19–25, 17–25); P2 Report			Korat Chatchai Hall, Nakhon Ratchasima

=== Pool B ===
Pos	Team	Pld	W	L	Pts	SW	SL	SR	SPW	SPL	SPR	Qualification
1	China	2	2	0	6	6	0	MAX	150	94	1.596	Quarterfinals
2	Vietnam	2	1	1	2	3	5	0.600	149	191	0.780	Quarterfinals
3	Chinese Taipei	2	0	2	1	2	6	0.333	172	186	0.925	Quarterfinals

Rules for classification: Pool standing procedure

16 September; 13:30	China	3–0	Vietnam	Korat Chatchai Hall, Nakhon Ratchasima
16 September; 13:30	(25–17, 25–9, 25–12); P2 Report			Korat Chatchai Hall, Nakhon Ratchasima

17 September; 11:00	Chinese Taipei	0–3	China	Korat Chatchai Hall, Nakhon Ratchasima
17 September; 11:00	(14–25, 20–25, 22–25); P2 Report			Korat Chatchai Hall, Nakhon Ratchasima

18 September; 13:30	Vietnam	3–2	Chinese Taipei	Korat Chatchai Hall, Nakhon Ratchasima
18 September; 13:30	(22–25, 28–26, 30–28, 16–25, 15–12); P2 Report			Korat Chatchai Hall, Nakhon Ratchasima

=== Pool C ===
Pos	Team	Pld	W	L	Pts	SW	SL	SR	SPW	SPL	SPR	Qualification
1	Iran	3	3	0	7	9	4	2.250	291	250	1.164	Quarterfinals
2	Australia	3	2	1	4	6	7	0.857	273	280	0.975	Quarterfinals
3	Philippines	3	1	2	5	7	7	1.000	290	304	0.954	Relegated to Classification Round
4	Kazakhstan	3	0	3	2	5	9	0.556	288	308	0.935	Relegated to Classification Round

Rules for classification: Pool standing procedure

16 September; 11:00	Kazakhstan	2–3	Iran	Korat Chatchai Hall, Nakhon Ratchasima
16 September; 11:00	(25–23, 17–25, 25–19, 23–25, 6–15); P2 Report			Korat Chatchai Hall, Nakhon Ratchasima

16 September; 16:00	Australia	3–2	Philippines	Korat Chatchai Hall, Nakhon Ratchasima
16 September; 16:00	(21–25, 21–25, 26–24, 25–16, 15–10); P2 Report			Korat Chatchai Hall, Nakhon Ratchasima

17 September; 13:30	Australia	3–2	Kazakhstan	Korat Chatchai Hall, Nakhon Ratchasima
17 September; 13:30	(21–25, 25–20, 25–23, 20–25, 15–12); P2 Report			Korat Chatchai Hall, Nakhon Ratchasima

17 September; 16:00	Philippines	2–3	Iran	Korat Chatchai Hall, Nakhon Ratchasima
17 September; 16:00	(29–27, 16–25, 25–17, 12–25, 13–15); P2 Report			Korat Chatchai Hall, Nakhon Ratchasima

18 September; 11:00	Iran	3–0	Australia	Korat Chatchai Hall, Nakhon Ratchasima
18 September; 11:00	(25–17, 25–22, 25–20); P2 Report			Korat Chatchai Hall, Nakhon Ratchasima

18 September; 16:00	Kazakhstan	1–3	Philippines	Korat Chatchai Hall, Nakhon Ratchasima
18 September; 16:00	(22–25, 23–25, 25–20, 17–25); P2 Report			Korat Chatchai Hall, Nakhon Ratchasima

=== Rankings ===
Pool A		Pool B		Pool C	
1	Thailand	1	China	1	Iran
2	South Korea	2	Vietnam	2	Australia
3	Japan	3	Chinese Taipei	3	Philippines
-		-		4	Kazakhstan

== Classification round ==
=== Classification round (R5-R10) ===
==== Section 1 ====
- Winners will advance to the 5th-8th Classification.
- Losers will be relegated to the 9th-place match.

Play-off
Sep 21
Kazakhstan	0
Vietnam	3

Play-off
Sep 21
Philippines	1
South Korea	3

21 September; 9:00	Kazakhstan	0–3	Vietnam	Korat Chatchai Hall, Nakhon Ratchasima
21 September; 9:00	(16–25, 14–25, 15–25); P2 Report			Korat Chatchai Hall, Nakhon Ratchasima

21 September; 13:30	Philippines	1–3	South Korea	Korat Chatchai Hall, Nakhon Ratchasima
21 September; 13:30	(13–25, 26–24, 7–25, 21–25); P2 Report			Korat Chatchai Hall, Nakhon Ratchasima

===== Section 2 =====
- Both teams will advance to the 5th-8th Classification.
- Loser will face the winner of Kazakhstan vs Vietnam.
- Winner will face the winner of Philippines vs South Korea.

Play-off
Sep 21
Iran	3
Australia	1

21 September; 11:00	Iran	3–1	Australia	Korat Chatchai Hall, Nakhon Ratchasima
21 September; 11:00	(22–25, 25–23, 25–22, 25–20); P2 Report			Korat Chatchai Hall, Nakhon Ratchasima

=== 9th place ===
22 September; 16:00	Kazakhstan	2–3	Philippines	Korat Chatchai Hall, Nakhon Ratchasima
22 September; 16:00	(13–25, 25–23, 22–25, 25–17, 8–15); P2 Report			Korat Chatchai Hall, Nakhon Ratchasima

== 5th-8th Classification ==
5th–8th place
Sep 22
Vietnam	3
Australia	0
Sep 22
South Korea	3
Iran	1

5th place
Sep 23
Vietnam	3
South Korea	0
7th place
Sep 23
Australia	3
Iran	1

=== 5th-8th place ===
22 September; 13:30	Vietnam	3–0	Australia	Korat Chatchai Hall, Nakhon Ratchasima
22 September; 13:30	(25–14, 25–15, 25–21); P2 Report			Korat Chatchai Hall, Nakhon Ratchasima

22 September; 18:30	South Korea	3–1	Iran	Korat Chatchai Hall, Nakhon Ratchasima
22 September; 18:30	(12–25, 26–24, 25–16, 25–19); P2 Report			Korat Chatchai Hall, Nakhon Ratchasima

=== 7th place ===
23 September; 11:00	Australia	3–1	Iran	Korat Chatchai Hall, Nakhon Ratchasima
23 September; 11:00	(22–25, 26–24, 26–24, 25–18); P2 Report			Korat Chatchai Hall, Nakhon Ratchasima

=== 5th place ===
23 September; 13:30	Vietnam	3–0	South Korea	Korat Chatchai Hall, Nakhon Ratchasima
23 September; 13:30	(25–22, 25–10, 25–16); P2 Report			Korat Chatchai Hall, Nakhon Ratchasima

== Final round ==
=== Play-offs ===
Quarter-finals
Sep 19
Thailand	3
Australia	0
Sep 19
China	3
Iran	0
Sep 19
South Korea	1
Chinese Taipei	3
Sep 19
Japan	3
Vietnam	1

Semi-finals
Sep 21
Thailand	2
China	3
Sep 21
Chinese Taipei	1
Japan	3

Final
Sep 23
China	3
Japan	0
Third place
Sep 23
Thailand	3
Chinese Taipei	0

==== Quarter-finals ====
19 September; 11:00	Japan	3–1	Vietnam	Korat Chatchai Hall, Nakhon Ratchasima
19 September; 11:00	(20–25, 25–23, 25–12, 25–23); P2 Report			Korat Chatchai Hall, Nakhon Ratchasima

19 September; 13:30	South Korea	1–3	Chinese Taipei	Korat Chatchai Hall, Nakhon Ratchasima
19 September; 13:30	(25–18, 20–25, 15–25, 24–26); P2 Report			Korat Chatchai Hall, Nakhon Ratchasima

19 September; 16:00	China	3–0	Iran	Korat Chatchai Hall, Nakhon Ratchasima
19 September; 16:00	(25–11, 25–12, 25–16); P2 Report			Korat Chatchai Hall, Nakhon Ratchasima

19 September; 18:30	Thailand	3–0	Australia	Korat Chatchai Hall, Nakhon Ratchasima
19 September; 18:30	(25–20, 25–21, 25–13); P2 Report			Korat Chatchai Hall, Nakhon Ratchasima

==== Semi-finals ====
21 September; 16:00	Chinese Taipei	1–3	Japan	Korat Chatchai Hall, Nakhon Ratchasima
21 September; 16:00	(15–25, 20–25, 25–21, 23–25); P2 Report			Korat Chatchai Hall, Nakhon Ratchasima

21 September; 18:30	Thailand	2–3	China	Korat Chatchai Hall, Nakhon Ratchasima
21 September; 18:30	(18–25, 21–25, 27–25, 25–22, 10–15); P2 Report			Korat Chatchai Hall, Nakhon Ratchasima

==== 3rd place ====
23 September; 16:00	Chinese Taipei	0–3	Thailand	Korat Chatchai Hall, Nakhon Ratchasima
23 September; 16:00	(20–25, 19–25, 20–25); P2 Report			Korat Chatchai Hall, Nakhon Ratchasima

==== Final ====
23 September; 18:30	Japan	0–3	China	Korat Chatchai Hall, Nakhon Ratchasima
23 September; 18:30	(23–25, 20–25, 17–25); P2 Report			Korat Chatchai Hall, Nakhon Ratchasima

== Final standing ==
Rank	Team
1st place, gold medalist(s)	China
2nd place, silver medalist(s)	Japan
3rd place, bronze medalist(s)	Thailand
4	Chinese Taipei
5	Vietnam
6	South Korea
7	Australia
8	Iran
9	Philippines
10	Kazakhstan

2018 Asian Women's Cup champions

China
5th title

14–woman roster
Yang Zhou, Che Wenhan, Ren Kaiyi, Gao Yi, Sun Haiping, Chen Xintong, Chen Peiyan, Gong Meizi, Zheng Yixin, Wang Meiyi, Liu Yanhan, Duan Fang, Zhang Yichan (c), Meng Zixuan
Head coach
Shi Hairong

== Awards ==
- Most valuable player

(China) Liu Yanhan

- Best outside spikers

(Japan) Miwako Osanai
(Thailand) Ajcharaporn Kongyot

- Best setter

(China) Sun Haiping

- Best opposite spiker

(Thailand) Pimpichaya Kokram

- Best middle blocker

(China) Gao Yi
(Chinese Taipei) Tseng Wan-Ling

- Best libero

(Japan) Rena Mizusugi

Source: AVC

== See also ==
- 2018 Asian Men's Volleyball Cup
- 2018 Asian Women's Volleyball Challenge Cup
