= 2017 Asian Women's Volleyball Championship =

International indoor volleyball tournament

Tournament details
- Host country: Philippines
- Cities: Biñan and Muntinlupa
- Dates: 9–17 August
- Teams: 14 (from 1 confederation)
- Venues: 2 (in 2 host cities)

Final positions
- Champions: Japan (4th title)
- Runners-up: Thailand
- Third place: South Korea
- Fourth place: China

Tournament awards
- MVP: (Japan) Risa Shinnabe

The 2017 Asian Women's Volleyball Championship was the nineteenth edition of the Asian Championship, a biennial international volleyball tournament organised by the Asian Volleyball Confederation (AVC) with Larong Volleyball sa Pilipinas, Inc. (LVPI). The tournament was held in both Biñan and Muntinlupa, Philippines from 9 to 17 August 2017.

== Qualification ==
The fourteen AVC member associations were from four zonal associations: Central Asia (4 teams), East Asia (5 teams), Oceania (2 teams), and Southeast Asia (3 teams). West Asian teams did not submit any of their women's national teams.

=== Qualified teams ===
The following teams qualified for the tournament. Maldives qualified for their first tournament. New Zealand made a return having last qualified at the 2007 edition.

Means of qualification	Births	Qualified	Ranked
Host country	1	Philippines	H
Central Asian teams	4	Iran	8
Central Asian teams	4	Kazakhstan	7
Central Asian teams	4	Maldives	—
Central Asian teams	4	Sri Lanka	11
East Asian teams	5	China	1
East Asian teams	5	Chinese Taipei	4
East Asian teams	5	Hong Kong	10
East Asian teams	5	Japan	6
East Asian teams	5	South Korea	2
Oceanian teams	2	Australia	9
Oceanian teams	2	New Zealand	—
Southeast Asian teams	2	Thailand	3
Southeast Asian teams	2	Vietnam	5
Total 14

Notes

- The bold team will be the top positions in each pool.

== Format ==
Muntinlupa Sports Center, one of the two venues of the tournament.

The tournament is played in three stages. In the first stage, the fourteen participants are divided in four groups. A single round-robin format is played within each group to determine the teams' group position (as per procedure below).

The two best teams of each group (total of 8 teams) progress to the second stage, the eight finalist are divided in two groups of four each. The pool standing will use the results and the points of the matches between the same teams that were already played during the preliminary round shall be taken into account for the classification round.

The third stage of the tournament consists of a single-elimination, with winners advancing to the next round until the final round.

=== Pool standing procedure ===
1. Number of matches won
2. Match points
3. Sets ratio
4. Points ratio
5. Result of the last match between the tied teams

Match won 3–0 or 3–1: 3 match points for the winner, 0 match points for the loser
Match won 3–2: 2 match points for the winner, 1 match point for the loser

== Pools composition ==
=== Preliminary round ===
The teams were seeded based on their final ranking at the 2015 Asian Women's Volleyball Championship. The host country and the top 7 ranked teams were seed in the Serpentine system. The 7 remaining teams were drawn on 27 February 2017 in Bangkok, Thailand.

Ranking from the previous edition was shown in brackets except the host (who ranked 12th) and the teams who did not participate, which were denoted by (–).

Pool A	Pool B	Pool C	Pool D
Philippines (Hosts)	China (1)	South Korea (2)	Thailand (3)
Kazakhstan (7)	Japan (6)	Vietnam (5)	Chinese Taipei (4)
Hong Kong (13)	Australia (9)	Sri Lanka (14)	Iran (8)
		New Zealand (–)	Maldives (–)

=== Classification round ===
Final Eight				9th–14th places			
Pool E		Pool F		Pool G		Pool H	
1A	Kazakhstan	1D	Thailand	3A	Hong Kong	3D	Iran
1C	South Korea	1B	Japan	4C	New Zealand	3B	Australia
2C	Vietnam	2B	China	3C	Sri Lanka	4D	Maldives
2A	Philippines (Hosts)	2D	Chinese Taipei				

== Preliminary round ==
- All times are in Philippine Standard Time (UTC+08:00).

=== Pool A ===
Pos	Team	Pld	W	L	Pts	SW	SL	SR	SPW	SPL	SPR	Qualification
1	Kazakhstan	2	2	0	6	6	0	MAX	150	106	1.415	Pools E and F
2	Philippines	2	1	1	3	3	3	1.000	137	129	1.062	Pools E and F
3	Hong Kong	2	0	2	0	0	6	0.000	98	150	0.653	Pools G and H

Date	Time	Venue		Score		Set 1	Set 2	Set 3	Set 4	Set 5	Total	Report
9 Aug	18:00	ASA	Hong Kong	0–3	Philippines	21–25	16–25	17–25			54–75	Report
10 Aug	17:30	ASA	Kazakhstan	3–0	Hong Kong	25–16	25–17	25–11			75–44	Report
11 Aug	17:30	ASA	Philippines	0–3	Kazakhstan	23–25	20–25	19–25			62–75	Report

=== Pool B ===
Pos	Team	Pld	W	L	Pts	SW	SL	SR	SPW	SPL	SPR	Qualification
1	Japan	2	2	0	6	6	0	MAX	151	96	1.573	Pools E and F
2	China	2	1	1	3	3	3	1.000	130	106	1.226	Pools E and F
3	Australia	2	0	2	0	0	6	0.000	71	150	0.473	Pools G and H

Date	Time	Venue		Score		Set 1	Set 2	Set 3	Set 4	Set 5	Total	Report
9 Aug	15:00	MSC	Japan	3–0	Australia	25–19	25–14	25–8			75–41	Report
10 Aug	12:30	ASA	China	0–3	Japan	14–25	17–25	24–26			55–76	Report
11 Aug	15:00	MSC	Australia	0–3	China	13–25	8–25	9–25			30–75	Report

=== Pool C ===
Pos	Team	Pld	W	L	Pts	SW	SL	SR	SPW	SPL	SPR	Qualification
1	South Korea	3	3	0	9	9	1	9.000	242	180	1.344	Pools E and F
2	Vietnam	3	2	1	6	7	3	2.333	239	166	1.440	Pools E and F
3	New Zealand	3	1	2	3	3	7	0.429	173	235	0.736	Pools G and H
4	Sri Lanka	3	0	3	0	1	9	0.111	172	245	0.702	Pools G and H

Date	Time	Venue		Score		Set 1	Set 2	Set 3	Set 4	Set 5	Total	Report
9 Aug	12:30	ASA	South Korea	3–0	New Zealand	25–21	25–14	25–12			75–47	Report
9 Aug	18:00	MSC	Vietnam	3–0	Sri Lanka	25–12	25–14	25–17			75–43	Report
10 Aug	15:00	MSC	South Korea	3–0	Sri Lanka	25–14	25–17	25–13			75–44	Report
10 Aug	17:30	MSC	New Zealand	0–3	Vietnam	11–25	12–25	8–25			31–75	Report
11 Aug	12:30	ASA	South Korea	3–1	Vietnam	25–23	25–19	17–25	25–22		92–89	Report
11 Aug	17:30	MSC	Sri Lanka	1–3	New Zealand	25–20	23–25	18–25	19–25		85–95	Report

=== Pool D ===
Pos	Team	Pld	W	L	Pts	SW	SL	SR	SPW	SPL	SPR	Qualification
1	Thailand	3	3	0	9	9	0	MAX	226	125	1.808	Pools E and F
2	Chinese Taipei	3	2	1	6	6	4	1.500	228	182	1.253	Pools E and F
3	Iran	3	1	2	3	4	6	0.667	200	206	0.971	Pools G and H
4	Maldives	3	0	3	0	0	9	0.000	84	225	0.373	Pools G and H

Date	Time	Venue		Score		Set 1	Set 2	Set 3	Set 4	Set 5	Total	Report
9 Aug	12:30	MSC	Chinese Taipei	3–1	Iran	25–15	25–27	25–17	25–20		100–79	Report
9 Aug	15:00	ASA	Thailand	3–0	Maldives	25–5	25–12	25–9			75–26	Report
10 Aug	12:30	MSC	Maldives	0–3	Chinese Taipei	9–25	8–25	10–25			27–75	Report
10 Aug	15:00	ASA	Thailand	3–0	Iran	25–18	25–12	25–16			75–46	Report
11 Aug	12:30	MSC	Iran	3–0	Maldives	25–4	25–13	25–14			75–31	Report
11 Aug	15:00	ASA	Thailand	3–0	Chinese Taipei	26–24	25–14	25–15			76–53	Report

== Classification round ==
- All times are in Philippine Standard Time (UTC+08:00).
- The results and the points of the matches between the same teams that were already played during the preliminary round shall be taken into account for the classification round.

=== Pool E ===
Pos	Team	Pld	W	L	Pts	SW	SL	SR	SPW	SPL	SPR	Qualification
1	South Korea	3	3	0	9	9	1	9.000	243	197	1.234	Quarterfinals
2	Kazakhstan	3	2	1	6	6	4	1.500	226	228	0.991	Quarterfinals
3	Philippines	3	1	2	3	3	7	0.429	210	247	0.850	Quarterfinals
4	Vietnam	3	0	3	0	3	9	0.333	276	283	0.975	Quarterfinals

Date	Time	Venue		Score		Set 1	Set 2	Set 3	Set 4	Set 5	Total	Report
13 Aug	10:00	ASA	Kazakhstan	3–1	Vietnam	21–25	25–23	25–22	25–20		96–90	Report
13 Aug	17:30	ASA	South Korea	3–0	Philippines	25–23	25–18	25–12			75–53	Report
14 Aug	12:30	ASA	Kazakhstan	0–3	South Korea	21–25	24–26	10–25			55–76	Report
14 Aug	17:30	ASA	Philippines	3–1	Vietnam	27–25	26–24	17–25	25–23		95–97	Report

=== Pool F ===
Pos	Team	Pld	W	L	Pts	SW	SL	SR	SPW	SPL	SPR	Qualification
1	Japan	3	3	0	9	9	1	9.000	249	201	1.239	Quarterfinals
2	Thailand	3	2	1	5	7	5	1.400	277	251	1.104	Quarterfinals
3	China	3	1	2	3	5	8	0.625	259	290	0.893	Quarterfinals
4	Chinese Taipei	3	0	3	1	2	9	0.222	212	255	0.831	Quarterfinals

Date	Time	Venue		Score		Set 1	Set 2	Set 3	Set 4	Set 5	Total	Report
13 Aug	12:30	ASA	Japan	3–0	Chinese Taipei	25–19	25–16	25–20			75–55	Report
13 Aug	15:00	ASA	Thailand	3–2	China	25–22	22–25	25–16	23–25	15–12	110–100	Report
14 Aug	10:00	ASA	China	3–2	Chinese Taipei	25–22	19–25	20–25	25–21	15–11	104–104	Report
14 Aug	15:00	ASA	Japan	3–1	Thailand	22–25	25–20	25–22	26–24		98–91	Report

=== Pool G ===
Pos	Team	Pld	W	L	Pts	SW	SL	SR	SPW	SPL	SPR	Qualification
1	Hong Kong	2	1	1	4	5	3	1.667	176	151	1.166	9th–12th semifinals
2	New Zealand	2	1	1	3	3	4	0.750	143	160	0.894	9th–12th semifinals
3	Sri Lanka	2	1	1	2	4	5	0.800	188	196	0.959	13th place match

Date	Time	Venue		Score		Set 1	Set 2	Set 3	Set 4	Set 5	Total	Report
13 Aug	10:00	MSC	Hong Kong	2–3	Sri Lanka	14–25	25–14	23–25	25–23	14–16	101–103	Report
14 Aug	12:30	MSC	Hong Kong	3–0	New Zealand	25–16	25–20	25–12			75–48	Report

=== Pool H ===
Pos	Team	Pld	W	L	Pts	SW	SL	SR	SPW	SPL	SPR	Qualification
1	Australia	2	2	0	6	6	1	6.000	173	122	1.418	9th–12th semifinals
2	Iran	2	1	1	3	4	3	1.333	164	129	1.271	9th–12th semifinals
3	Maldives	2	0	2	0	0	6	0.000	64	150	0.427	13th place match

Date	Time	Venue		Score		Set 1	Set 2	Set 3	Set 4	Set 5	Total	Report
13 Aug	12:30	MSC	Australia	3–0	Maldives	25–9	25–5	25–19			75–33	Report
14 Aug	10:00	MSC	Australia	3–1	Iran	23–25	25–22	25–20	25–22		98–89	Report

== Final round ==
- All times are in Philippine Standard Time (UTC+08:00).

=== 13th place match ===
Date	Time	Venue		Score		Set 1	Set 2	Set 3	Set 4	Set 5	Total	Report
15 Aug	10:00	MSC	Sri Lanka	3–0	Maldives	25–19	25–13	25–14			75–46	Report

9th–12th semifinals
15 Aug – Muntinlupa
Hong Kong	1
Iran	3
15 Aug – Muntinlupa
Australia	3
New Zealand	0

9th place match
16 Aug – Muntinlupa
Iran	3
Australia	2
11th place match
16 Aug – Muntinlupa
Hong Kong	3
New Zealand	0

=== 9th–12th semifinals ===
Date	Time	Venue		Score		Set 1	Set 2	Set 3	Set 4	Set 5	Total	Report
15 Aug	12:30	MSC	Hong Kong	1–3	Iran	25–21	19–25	18–25	15–25		77–96	Report
15 Aug	15:00	MSC	Australia	3–0	New Zealand	25–14	25–17	25–17			75–48	Report

=== 11th place match ===
Date	Time	Venue		Score		Set 1	Set 2	Set 3	Set 4	Set 5	Total	Report
16 Aug	10:00	MSC	Hong Kong	3–0	New Zealand	25–15	25–12	25–19			75–46	Report

=== 9th place match ===
Date	Time	Venue		Score		Set 1	Set 2	Set 3	Set 4	Set 5	Total	Report
16 Aug	12:30	MSC	Iran	3–2	Australia	19–25	25–18	20–25	25–22	15–10	104–100	Report

=== Final eight ===
Quarterfinals
15 Aug – Biñan
Japan	3
Vietnam	0
15 Aug – Biñan
Kazakhstan	0
China	3
15 Aug – Biñan
South Korea	3
Chinese Taipei	0
15 Aug – Biñan
Thailand	3
Philippines	0

Semifinals
16 Aug – Biñan
Japan	3
China	0
16 Aug – Biñan
South Korea	0
Thailand	3

Final
17 Aug – Biñan
Japan	3
Thailand	2
3rd place match
17 Aug – Biñan
China	0
South Korea	3

5th–8th semifinals
16 Aug – Biñan
Vietnam	3
Kazakhstan	2
16 Aug – Biñan
Chinese Taipei	3
Philippines	0

5th place match
17 Aug – Biñan
Vietnam	3
Chinese Taipei	0
7th place match
17 Aug – Biñan
Kazakhstan	3
Philippines	2

==== Quarterfinals ====
Date	Time	Venue		Score		Set 1	Set 2	Set 3	Set 4	Set 5	Total	Report
15 Aug	10:00	ASA	Kazakhstan	0–3	China	16–25	32–34	23–25			71–84	Report
15 Aug	12:30	ASA	South Korea	3–0	Chinese Taipei	25–20	25–11	28–26			78–57	Report
15 Aug	15:00	ASA	Japan	3–0	Vietnam	25–22	25–21	25–16			75–59	Report
15 Aug	17:30	ASA	Thailand	3–0	Philippines	25–21	25–14	25–20			75–55	Report

==== 5th–7th place semifinals ====
Date	Time	Venue		Score		Set 1	Set 2	Set 3	Set 4	Set 5	Total	Report
16 Aug	10:00	ASA	Vietnam	3–2	Kazakhstan	25–22	25–18	21–25	20–25	15–5	106–95	Report
16 Aug	12:30	ASA	Chinese Taipei	3–0	Philippines	25–19	25–20	25–19			75–58	Report

==== Semifinals ====
Date	Time	Venue		Score		Set 1	Set 2	Set 3	Set 4	Set 5	Total	Report
16 Aug	15:00	ASA	Japan	3–0	China	25–17	25–18	25–18			75–53	Report
16 Aug	17:30	ASA	Thailand	3–0	South Korea	25–20	25–20	25–21			75–61	Report

==== 7th place match ====
Date	Time	Venue		Score		Set 1	Set 2	Set 3	Set 4	Set 5	Total	Report
17 Aug	10:00	ASA	Kazakhstan	3–2	Philippines	25–20	25–16	21–25	21–25	15–3	107–89	Report

==== 5th place match ====
Date	Time	Venue		Score		Set 1	Set 2	Set 3	Set 4	Set 5	Total	Report
17 Aug	12:30	ASA	Vietnam	3–0	Chinese Taipei	25–23	25–22	25–23			75–68	Report

==== 3rd place match ====
Date	Time	Venue		Score		Set 1	Set 2	Set 3	Set 4	Set 5	Total	Report
17 Aug	15:00	ASA	China	0–3	South Korea	11–25	18–25	20–25			49–75	Report

==== Final ====
Date	Time	Venue		Score		Set 1	Set 2	Set 3	Set 4	Set 5	Total	Report
17 Aug	17:30	ASA	Japan	3–2	Thailand	26–28	20–25	25–16	25–16	15–7	111–92	Report

== Final standings ==
Rank	Team
1st place, gold medalist(s)	Japan
2nd place, silver medalist(s)	Thailand
3rd place, bronze medalist(s)	South Korea
4	China
5	Vietnam
6	Chinese Taipei
7	Kazakhstan
8	Philippines
9	Iran
10	Australia
11	Hong Kong
12	New Zealand
13	Sri Lanka
14	Maldives

Qualified to 2018 AVC Cup for Women
Qualified to 2018 AVC Cup for Women as host country

2017 Asian Women's champions

Japan
4th title

Team roster
Kotoe Inoue, Sarina Koga, Nana Iwasaka, Risa Shinnabe, Erika Araki, Rika Nomoto, Haruyo Shimamura, Koyomi Tominaga, Yurie Nabeya, Miya Sato, Mai Okumura, Risa Ishii, Mami Uchiseto, Mako Kobata
Head Coach: Kumi Nakada

== Awards ==
- Most valuable player
  Risa Shinnabe (JPN)
- Best setter
  Nootsara Tomkom (THA)
- Best outside spikers
  Kim Yeon-koung (KOR)
  Chatchu-on Moksri (THA)
- Best middle blockers
  Hattaya Bamrungsuk (THA)
  Nana Iwasaka (JPN)
- Best opposite spiker
  Jin Ye (CHN)
- Best liberos
  Mako Kobata (JPN)
  Dawn Macandili (PHI)

== See also ==
- 2017 Asian Men's Volleyball Championship
