= Lee Sook-ja =

South Korean volleyball player (born 1980)

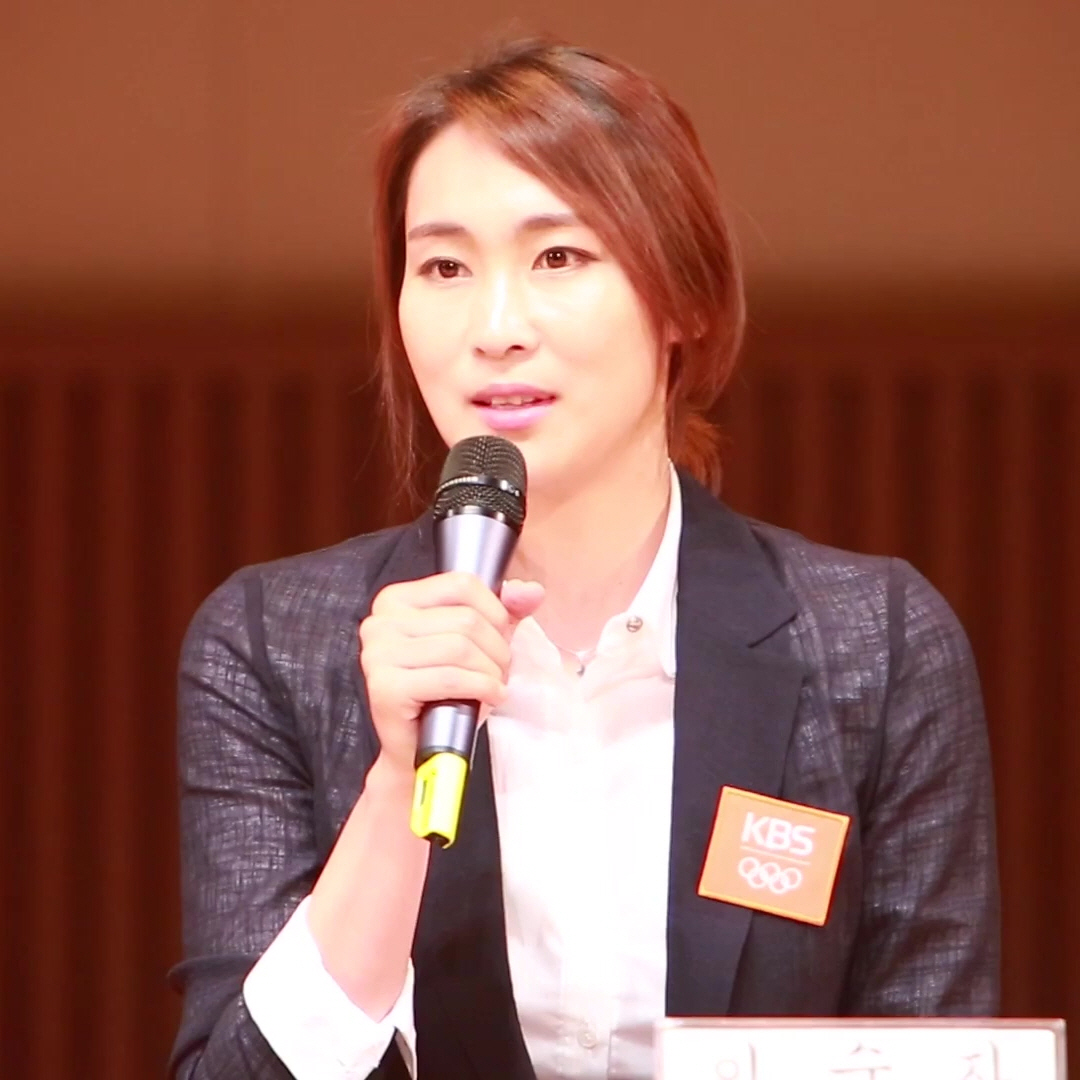

Personal information
- Born: June 17, 1980 (age 46); South Korea
- Height: 1.75 m (5 ft 9 in)
- Weight: 58 kg (128 lb)
- Spike: 264 cm (104 in)
- Block: 286 cm (113 in)

Volleyball information
- Current club: GS Caltex

Lee Sook-ja (Korean: 이숙자; Hanja: 李淑子; born 17 June 1980) is a South Korean retired volleyball player. She was part of the team at the 2012 Summer Olympics. She participated in the 2011 FIVB World Grand Prix.

On 2014, Lee announced her retirement. She later became a commentator on KBS Sports.
