= Hu Mingyuan =

Chinese volleyball player (born 1996)

Personal information
- Full name: 胡铭媛
- Nationality: Chinese
- Born: 17 May 1996 (age 30); Qiqihar, Heilongjiang
- Hometown: Qiqihar, Heilongjiang
- Height: 186 cm (6 ft 1 in)
- Weight: 72 kg (159 lb)
- Spike: 290 cm (114 in)
- Block: 285 cm (112 in)

Volleyball information
- Position: Middle Blocker
- Current club: Liaoning Sansheng
- Number: 5 (NT) 6 (Club)

Career
Years	Teams
2013 - present	Liaoning Sansheng

National team
2012 - 2013; 2014 - 2015; 2018 - 2021	China U18; China U20; China
Honours
Women's volleyball
Representing China
World Championship
Bronze medal – third place	2018 Japan	Team
Volleyball Nations League
Bronze medal – third place	2018 Nanjing	Team
Bronze medal – third place	2019 Nanjing	Team
Asian Games
Gold medal – first place	2018 Jakarta-Palembang
U18 World Championship
Gold medal – first place	2013 Thailand
- Last updated: 16 June 2018

Hu Mingyuan (Chinese: 胡铭媛; born May 17, 1996) is a female Chinese volleyball player. She is a middle blocker of the China women's national volleyball team. She participated at the 2019 Montreux Volley Masters,

On the club level, she plays for Liaoning Sansheng.
