= 2016 AVC Cup for Women =

International indoor volleyball tournament

2016 Asian Women's Volleyball Cup
Tournament details
- Host country: Vietnam
- City: Vĩnh Phúc
- Dates: 14–20 September
- Teams: 8 (from 1 confederation)
- Venue: 1 (in 1 host city)

Final positions
- Champions: China (4th title)
- Runners-up: Kazakhstan
- Third place: Thailand
- Fourth place: Japan

Tournament awards
- MVP: (China) Li Jing

The 2016 Asian Women's Volleyball Cup, so-called 2016 AVC Cup for Women was the fifth edition of the Asian Cup, a biennial international volleyball tournament organised by the Asian Volleyball Confederation (AVC) with Volleyball Federation of Vietnam (VFV). The tournament was held in the Vinh Yen Gymnasium in the Vĩnh Phúc Province, Vietnam from 14 to 20 September 2016.

== Pools composition ==
The teams are seeded based on their final ranking at the 2015 Asian Women's Volleyball Championship by serpentine system. The hosts which ranked fifth has the right to seed in top position of pool A. The number in brackets show the ranking of 2015 Asian Women's Volleyball Championship.

Pool A	Pool B
Vietnam (Hosts)	China (1)
Thailand (3)	South Korea (2)
Chinese Taipei (4)	Japan (6)
Iran (8)	Kazakhstan (7)

== Preliminary round ==
- All times are Indochina Time (UTC+07:00).

=== Pool A ===
Pos	Team	Pld	W	L	Pts	SW	SL	SR	SPW	SPL	SPR	Qualification
1	Thailand	3	3	0	8	9	2	4.500	265	211	1.256	Final Round
2	Vietnam	3	2	1	4	6	7	0.857	280	281	0.996	Final Round
3	Chinese Taipei	3	1	2	5	7	6	1.167	271	270	1.004	Final Round
4	Iran	3	0	3	1	2	9	0.222	206	260	0.792	Final Round

Date	Time		Score		Set 1	Set 2	Set 3	Set 4	Set 5	Total	Report
14 Sep	14:30	Chinese Taipei	2–3	Thailand	22–25	25–23	25–22	13–25	15–17	100–112	Report
14 Sep	20:30	Iran	2–3	Vietnam	25–27	25–22	25–21	20–25	12–15	107–110	Report
15 Sep	14:30	Iran	0–3	Chinese Taipei	23–25	12–25	19–25			54–75	Report
15 Sep	20:30	Vietnam	0–3	Thailand	26–28	18–25	22–25			66–78	Report
16 Sep	14:30	Thailand	3–0	Iran	25–12	25–12	25–21			75–45	Report
16 Sep	20:30	Vietnam	3–2	Chinese Taipei	16–25	23–25	25–17	25–17	15–12	104–96	Report

=== Pool B ===
Pos	Team	Pld	W	L	Pts	SW	SL	SR	SPW	SPL	SPR	Qualification
1	Japan	3	2	1	7	8	4	2.000	258	228	1.132	Final Round
2	China	3	2	1	6	8	5	1.600	282	237	1.190	Final Round
3	Kazakhstan	3	2	1	5	7	5	1.400	263	235	1.119	Final Round
4	South Korea	3	0	3	0	0	9	0.000	122	225	0.542	Final Round

Date	Time		Score		Set 1	Set 2	Set 3	Set 4	Set 5	Total	Report
14 Sep	12:00	Kazakhstan	1–3	Japan	20–25	21–25	25–17	23–25		89–92	Report
14 Sep	17:00	South Korea	0–3	China	17–25	14–25	16–25			47–75	Report
15 Sep	12:00	Kazakhstan	3–0	South Korea	25–9	25–13	25–14			75–36	Report
15 Sep	18:00	Japan	2–3	China	15–25	25–15	19–25	25–20	7–15	91–100	Report
16 Sep	12:00	South Korea	0–3	Japan	13–25	18–25	8–25			39–75	Report
16 Sep	18:00	China	2–3	Kazakhstan	22–25	25–23	25–11	23–25	12–15	107–99	Report

== Final round ==
- All times are Indochina Time (UTC+07:00).

Quarterfinals
18 September
Japan	3
Iran	1
18 September
Vietnam	0
Kazakhstan	3
18 September
Thailand	3
South Korea	0
18 September
China	3
Chinese Taipei	0

Semifinals
19 September
Japan	1
Kazakhstan	3
19 September
Thailand	2
China	3

Final
20 September
Kazakhstan	0
China	3
3rd place
20 September
Japan	0
Thailand	3

5th–8th places
19 September
Iran	3
Vietnam	1
19 September
South Korea	0
Chinese Taipei	3

5th place
20 September
Iran	1
Chinese Taipei	3
7th place
20 September
Vietnam	3
South Korea	2

=== Quarterfinals ===
Date	Time		Score		Set 1	Set 2	Set 3	Set 4	Set 5	Total	Report
18 Sep	12:00	Japan	3–1	Iran	25–21	20–25	25–21	25–21		95–88	Report
18 Sep	14:30	China	3–0	Chinese Taipei	25–19	25–15	25–12			75–46	Report
18 Sep	18:00	Thailand	3–0	South Korea	25–6	25–12	25–20			75–38	Report
18 Sep	20:30	Vietnam	0–3	Kazakhstan	23–25	23–25	23–25			69–75	Report

=== 5th–8th semifinals ===
Date	Time		Score		Set 1	Set 2	Set 3	Set 4	Set 5	Total	Report
19 Sep	12:00	South Korea	0–3	Chinese Taipei	20–25	17–25	18–25			55–75	Report
19 Sep	14:30	Iran	3–1	Vietnam	19–25	25–14	32–30	25–23		101–92	Report

=== Semifinals ===
Date	Time		Score		Set 1	Set 2	Set 3	Set 4	Set 5	Total	Report
19 Sep	18:00	Thailand	2–3	China	21–25	25–23	25–18	21–25	13–15	105–106	Report
19 Sep	20:30	Japan	1–3	Kazakhstan	25–19	11–25	21–25	16–25		73–94	Report

=== 7th place ===
Date	Time		Score		Set 1	Set 2	Set 3	Set 4	Set 5	Total	Report
20 Sep	14:30	Vietnam	3–2	South Korea	25–17	25–27	23–25	25–18	15–8	113–95	Report

=== 5th place ===
Date	Time		Score		Set 1	Set 2	Set 3	Set 4	Set 5	Total	Report
20 Sep	12:00	Iran	1–3	Chinese Taipei	21–25	21–25	25–23	22–25		89–98	Report

=== 3rd place ===
Date	Time		Score		Set 1	Set 2	Set 3	Set 4	Set 5	Total	Report
20 Sep	18:00	Japan	0–3	Thailand	22–25	16–25	17–25			55–75	Report

=== Final ===
Date	Time		Score		Set 1	Set 2	Set 3	Set 4	Set 5	Total	Report
20 Sep	20:30	Kazakhstan	0–3	China	19–25	19–25	13–25			51–75	Report

== Final standing ==
Rank	Team
1st place, gold medalist(s)	China
2nd place, silver medalist(s)	Kazakhstan
3rd place, bronze medalist(s)	Thailand
4	Japan
5	Chinese Taipei
6	Iran
7	Vietnam
8	South Korea

2016 Asian Women's Cup champions

China
4th title

Team Roster
Chen Liyi, Li Jing, Yang Zhou, Zheng Yixin, Wang Na, Zhang Changning, Yao Di, Xu Jiujing, Song Meili, Zhang Xiaoya, Gong Xiangyu, Wang Yuanyuan, Shan Danna, Wang Mengjie
Head Coach: Chen Youquan

== Awards ==
- MVP:
  (China) Li Jing
- Best Setter:
  (Kazakhstan) Irina Lukomskaya
- Best Outside Spikers:
  (China) Li Jing
  (Thailand) Ajcharaporn Kongyot
- Best Middle Blockers:
  (Kazakhstan) Kristina Anikonova
  (China) Yang Zhou
- Best Opposite Spiker:
  (Kazakhstan) Yekaterina Zhdanova
- Best Libero:
  (Thailand) Piyanut Pannoy

== See also ==
- 2016 Asian Men's Volleyball Cup
