= Volleyball Australia =

Sports governing body in Australia

- Sport: Volleyball
- Jurisdiction: Australia
- Abbreviation: VA
- Founded: 1963
- Affiliation: FIVB
- Regional affiliation: AVC
- Location: Canberra, ACT
- President: Craig Carracher
- CEO: Andrew Dee
- Sponsor: Hancock Prospecting

Official website
- volleyball.org.au
- (Australia)

The Volleyball Australia, formerly known as Australian Volleyball Federation, is the national governing body for volleyball in Australia. The AVF is responsible for maintaining national Volleyball competitions, alongside state level associations.

It was established in 1963 at the Interstate Cup.

== National teams ==
For details please refer to main articles for dedicated teams.

Men's

- Australia men's national volleyball team
- Under-21
- Under-19
- Under-17

Women's

- Australia women's national volleyball team
- Under-21
- Under-19
- Under-17

== State and territory organisations ==
- Volleyball Australian Capital Territory
- Volleyball New South Wales
- Volleyball Northern Territory
- Volleyball Queensland
- Volleyball South Australia
- Volleyball Tasmania
- Volleyball Victoria
- Volleyball Western Australia
