= 2018 Asian Women's Club Volleyball Championship squads =

This article shows the rosters of all participating teams at the 2018 Asian Women's Club Volleyball Championship in Ust-Kamenogorsk, Kazakhstan.

== Pool A ==
=== Supreme Chonburi ===
The following is the roster of the Thai club Supreme Chonburi in the 2018 Asian Club Championship.

Head coach: (Thailand) Nataphon Srisamutnak

No.	Name	Date of birth	Height	Weight	Spike	Block
1	(Thailand) Supattra Pairoj	27 June 1990	1.60 m (5 ft 3 in)	58 kg (128 lb)	275 cm (108 in)	265 cm (104 in)
2	(Thailand) Piyanut Pannoy	10 November 1989	1.71 m (5 ft 7 in)	62 kg (137 lb)	280 cm (110 in)	275 cm (108 in)
3	(Thailand) Wipawee Srithong	28 January 1999	1.74 m (5 ft 9 in)	64 kg (141 lb)	288 cm (113 in)	266 cm (105 in)
5	(Thailand) Pleumjit Thinkaow	9 November 1983	1.80 m (5 ft 11 in)	64 kg (141 lb)	303 cm (119 in)	293 cm (115 in)
7	(Thailand) Patcharaporn Sittisad	27 February 1996	1.65 m (5 ft 5 in)	55 kg (121 lb)	278 cm (109 in)	267 cm (105 in)
8	(United States) Taylor Sandbothe	15 December 1994	1.88 m (6 ft 2 in)	55 kg (121 lb)	300 cm (120 in)	297 cm (117 in)
9	(Thailand) Chatchu-on Moksri	6 November 1999	1.78 m (5 ft 10 in)	68 kg (150 lb)	298 cm (117 in)	290 cm (110 in)
10	(Thailand) Wilavan Apinyapong (C)	6 June 1984	1.74 m (5 ft 9 in)	67 kg (148 lb)	294 cm (116 in)	280 cm (110 in)
11	(Thailand) Nampueng Khamart	26 March 1989	1.70 m (5 ft 7 in)	65 kg (143 lb)	275 cm (108 in)	268 cm (106 in)
13	(Thailand) Nootsara Tomkom	7 July 1985	1.69 m (5 ft 7 in)	57 kg (126 lb)	289 cm (114 in)	278 cm (109 in)
14	(Thailand) Kullapa Piampongsann	17 May 1991	1.78 m (5 ft 10 in)	60 kg (130 lb)	280 cm (110 in)	274 cm (108 in)
17	(Thailand) Watchareeya Nuanjam	22 July 1996	1.78 m (5 ft 10 in)	64 kg (141 lb)	292 cm (115 in)	279 cm (110 in)
18	(Thailand) Ajcharaporn Kongyot	18 June 1995	1.80 m (5 ft 11 in)	65 kg (143 lb)	298 cm (117 in)	287 cm (113 in)
19	(Senegal) Fatou Diouck	19 June 1985	1.83 m (6 ft 0 in)	70 kg (150 lb)	306 cm (120 in)	287 cm (113 in)

=== NEC Red Rockets ===
The following is the roster of the Japanese club NEC Red Rockets in the 2018 Asian Club Championship.

Head coach: (Japan) Takayuki Kaneko

No.	Name	Date of birth	Height	Weight	Spike	Block
5	(Japan) Kana Ōno	30 June 1992	1.80 m (5 ft 11 in)	70 kg (150 lb)	301 cm (119 in)	285 cm (112 in)
6	(Japan) Kaori Ueno	6 January 1995	1.80 m (5 ft 11 in)	73 kg (161 lb)	295 cm (116 in)	275 cm (108 in)
7	(Japan) Kaname Yamaguchi	6 November 1989	1.70 m (5 ft 7 in)	67 kg (148 lb)	294 cm (116 in)	265 cm (104 in)
8	(Japan) Mizuki Yanakita (C)	26 March 1996	1.68 m (5 ft 6 in)	64 kg (141 lb)	303 cm (119 in)	275 cm (108 in)
9	(Japan) Yuna Okuyama	26 September 1995	1.70 m (5 ft 7 in)	67 kg (148 lb)	288 cm (113 in)	270 cm (110 in)
10	(Japan) Sayaka Iwasaki	18 July 1990	1.58 m (5 ft 2 in)	50 kg (110 lb)	274 cm (108 in)	250 cm (98 in)
11	(Japan) Sayaka Shinohara	16 August 1996	1.64 m (5 ft 5 in)	56 kg (123 lb)	287 cm (113 in)	274 cm (108 in)
12	(Japan) Kanami Hirose	12 May 1997	1.77 m (5 ft 10 in)	64 kg (141 lb)	305 cm (120 in)	285 cm (112 in)
13	(Japan) Misaki Yamauchi	10 March 1995	1.72 m (5 ft 8 in)	69 kg (152 lb)	306 cm (120 in)	295 cm (116 in)
14	(Japan) Shiori Tsukada	7 September 1994	1.75 m (5 ft 9 in)	63 kg (139 lb)	280 cm (110 in)	265 cm (104 in)
15	(Japan) Manami Kojima	7 November 1994	1.58 m (5 ft 2 in)	58 kg (128 lb)	260 cm (100 in)	245 cm (96 in)
16	(Japan) Shiori Aratani	22 September 1998	1.73 m (5 ft 8 in)	60 kg (130 lb)	300 cm (120 in)	275 cm (108 in)
17	(Japan) Nichika Yamada	24 February 2000	1.83 m (6 ft 0 in)	71 kg (157 lb)	293 cm (115 in)	286 cm (113 in)

=== Jiangsu Zenith Steel ===
The following is the roster of the Chinese club Jiangsu Zenith Steel in the 2018 Asian Club Championship.

Head coach: (China) Cai Bin

No.	Name	Date of birth	Height	Weight	Spike	Block
1	(China) Wu Han	23 April 1998	1.80 m (5 ft 11 in)	63 kg (139 lb)	315 cm (124 in)	308 cm (121 in)
3	(China) Rong Wanqianbai	1 January 1997	1.84 m (6 ft 0 in)	75 kg (165 lb)	302 cm (119 in)	290 cm (110 in)
4	(China) Wang Yuqi	21 August 1998	1.80 m (5 ft 11 in)	64 kg (141 lb)	300 cm (120 in)	295 cm (116 in)
5	(China) Yang Wenjin	13 July 1997	1.82 m (6 ft 0 in)	72 kg (159 lb)	310 cm (120 in)	305 cm (120 in)
7	(China) Zhou Xinyi	17 March 1997	1.87 m (6 ft 2 in)	69 kg (152 lb)	287 cm (113 in)	274 cm (108 in)
8	(China) Zang Qianqian	14 August 1998	1.75 m (5 ft 9 in)	60 kg (130 lb)	315 cm (124 in)	308 cm (121 in)
9	(China) Xu Ruoya (C)	1 March 1994	1.92 m (6 ft 4 in)	88 kg (194 lb)	315 cm (124 in)	305 cm (120 in)
11	(China) Wang Chenyue	22 August 1995	1.93 m (6 ft 4 in)	70 kg (150 lb)	305 cm (120 in)	295 cm (116 in)
13	(China) Bai Jie	20 October 1997	1.87 m (6 ft 2 in)	80 kg (180 lb)	310 cm (120 in)	305 cm (120 in)
14	(China) Chen Yixuan	23 April 1999	1.81 m (5 ft 11 in)	74 kg (163 lb)	290 cm (110 in)	300 cm (120 in)
17	(China) Wei Yuxin	16 April 1997	1.85 m (6 ft 1 in)	74 kg (163 lb)	315 cm (124 in)	308 cm (121 in)

== Pool B ==
=== Altay ===
The following is the roster of the Kazakhstani club Altay in the 2018 Asian Club Championship.

Head coach: (Russia) Iurii Panchenko

No.	Name	Date of birth	Height	Weight	Spike	Block
1	(Brazil) Heloiza Pereira	2 November 1990	1.88 m (6 ft 2 in)	77 kg (170 lb)	310 cm (120 in)	304 cm (120 in)
2	(Kazakhstan) Sana Anarkulova (C)	21 July 1989	1.88 m (6 ft 2 in)	72 kg (159 lb)	300 cm (120 in)	295 cm (116 in)
3	(Kazakhstan) Natalya Akilova	31 May 1993	1.83 m (6 ft 0 in)	62 kg (137 lb)	295 cm (116 in)	275 cm (108 in)
4	(Kazakhstan) Aliya Sadykova	1 August 1988	1.72 m (5 ft 8 in)	60 kg (130 lb)	270 cm (110 in)	260 cm (100 in)
7	(Kazakhstan) Tatyana Fendrikova	23 February 1990	1.69 m (5 ft 7 in)	55 kg (121 lb)	280 cm (110 in)	275 cm (108 in)
8	(Kazakhstan) Korinna Ishimtseva	8 February 1984	1.84 m (6 ft 0 in)	70 kg (150 lb)	300 cm (120 in)	290 cm (110 in)
9	(Russia) Natalia Sharshakova	28 March 1990	1.87 m (6 ft 2 in)	75 kg (165 lb)	300 cm (120 in)	310 cm (120 in)
11	(Kazakhstan) Botagoz Sarsenbayeva	16 May 1997	1.75 m (5 ft 9 in)	60 kg (130 lb)	270 cm (110 in)	260 cm (100 in)
12	(Kazakhstan) Ainagul Aizharikhova	4 September 1994	1.85 m (6 ft 1 in)	65 kg (143 lb)	290 cm (110 in)	280 cm (110 in)
14	(Kazakhstan) Alla Bogdashkina	22 August 1985	1.85 m (6 ft 1 in)	65 kg (143 lb)	275 cm (108 in)	270 cm (110 in)
16	(Russia) Lyudmila Khabibulina	18 May 1988	1.90 m (6 ft 3 in)	75 kg (165 lb)	310 cm (120 in)	305 cm (120 in)
17	(Kazakhstan) Olga Kubassevich	10 June 1980	1.83 m (6 ft 0 in)	75 kg (165 lb)	300 cm (120 in)	295 cm (116 in)
18	(Kazakhstan) Kristina Anikonova	5 January 1991	1.84 m (6 ft 0 in)	72 kg (159 lb)	290 cm (110 in)	280 cm (110 in)
19	(Cuba) Yunieska Batista	21 March 1993	1.85 m (6 ft 1 in)	70 kg (150 lb)	315 cm (124 in)	300 cm (120 in)

=== CMFC ===
The following is the roster of the Taiwanese club CMFC in the 2018 Asian Club Championship.

Head coach: (Chinese Taipei) Tsai Shu-Han

No.	Name	Date of birth	Height	Weight	Spike	Block
1	(Chinese Taipei) Lai Xiang-chen	19 March 1995	1.51 m (4 ft 11 in)	52 kg (115 lb)	255 cm (100 in)	245 cm (96 in)
2	(Chinese Taipei) Chang Li-wen (C)	27 February 1995	1.76 m (5 ft 9 in)	64 kg (141 lb)	278 cm (109 in)	268 cm (106 in)
4	(Chinese Taipei) Lo Yi-Ching	16 September 1997	1.60 m (5 ft 3 in)	55 kg (121 lb)	255 cm (100 in)	255 cm (100 in)
5	(Chinese Taipei) Tsai Wang-chen	28 November 1994	1.72 m (5 ft 8 in)	66 kg (146 lb)	270 cm (110 in)	260 cm (100 in)
7	(Chinese Taipei) Wu Wei-hua	5 February 1994	1.73 m (5 ft 8 in)	72 kg (159 lb)	270 cm (110 in)	260 cm (100 in)
8	(Chinese Taipei) Chiu Ya-hui	4 April 1998	1.80 m (5 ft 11 in)	67 kg (148 lb)	272 cm (107 in)	260 cm (100 in)
13	(Chinese Taipei) Huang Man-ya	10 October 1999	1.79 m (5 ft 10 in)	60 kg (130 lb)	283 cm (111 in)	270 cm (110 in)
14	(Chinese Taipei) Chen Ciao-ling	27 April 2000	1.63 m (5 ft 4 in)	60 kg (130 lb)	275 cm (108 in)	270 cm (110 in)
15	(Chinese Taipei) Ho Pei-shan	2 May 1999	1.69 m (5 ft 7 in)	64 kg (141 lb)	255 cm (100 in)	255 cm (100 in)
16	(Chinese Taipei) Chen Tzu-ya	26 August 1997	1.78 m (5 ft 10 in)	62 kg (137 lb)	270 cm (110 in)	260 cm (100 in)
17	(Chinese Taipei) Low Mei-cing	17 January 1996	1.84 m (6 ft 0 in)	72 kg (159 lb)	308 cm (121 in)	295 cm (116 in)
20	(Chinese Taipei) Chang Li-ting	12 February 1996	1.78 m (5 ft 10 in)	70 kg (150 lb)	280 cm (110 in)	275 cm (108 in)

=== Paykan Tehran VC ===
The following is the roster of the Iranian club Paykan Tehran VC in the 2018 Asian Club Championship.

Head coach: (Iran) Mitra Shabanian

No.	Name	Date of birth	Height	Weight	Spike	Block
2	(Iran) Fatemeh Amini	19 October 1997	1.78 m (5 ft 10 in)	64 kg (141 lb)	291 cm (115 in)	285 cm (112 in)
3	(Iran) Sara Akhlaghi	27 September 1992	1.73 m (5 ft 8 in)	69 kg (152 lb)	270 cm (110 in)	271 cm (107 in)
4	(Iran) Soudabeh Bagherpour	16 September 1990	1.86 m (6 ft 1 in)	68 kg (150 lb)	293 cm (115 in)	288 cm (113 in)
5	(Iran) Haniyeh Mohtashamipour	20 November 1996	1.90 m (6 ft 3 in)	68 kg (150 lb)	292 cm (115 in)	286 cm (113 in)
7	(Iran) Zeinab Giveh	11 July 1983	1.70 m (5 ft 7 in)	61 kg (134 lb)	291 cm (115 in)	285 cm (112 in)
10	(Iran) Maedeh Borhani Esfahani (C)	22 June 1988	1.83 m (6 ft 0 in)	72 kg (159 lb)	300 cm (120 in)	291 cm (115 in)
11	(Iran) Mahsa Kadkhoda	22 June 1993	1.79 m (5 ft 10 in)	69 kg (152 lb)	330 cm (130 in)	296 cm (117 in)
12	(Iran) Mansoureh Abbasi	9 March 1993	1.75 m (5 ft 9 in)	62 kg (137 lb)	285 cm (112 in)	281 cm (111 in)
13	(Iran) Negar Kiani	8 June 1992	1.71 m (5 ft 7 in)	59 kg (130 lb)	275 cm (108 in)	271 cm (107 in)
14	(Iran) Elhem Falleh	14 April 1994	1.75 m (5 ft 9 in)	70 kg (150 lb)	278 cm (109 in)	272 cm (107 in)
16	(Iran) Tahmineh dargazani	26 March 1996	1.90 m (6 ft 3 in)	76 kg (168 lb)	320 cm (130 in)	291 cm (115 in)
19	(Iran) Mahtab Rahmani	25 August 1992	1.85 m (6 ft 1 in)	65 kg (143 lb)	330 cm (130 in)	297 cm (117 in)

== Pool C ==
=== VTV Bình Điền Long An ===
The following is the roster of the Vietnamese club VTV Bình Điền Long An in the 2018 Asian Club Championship.

Head coach: (Vietnam) Nguyễn Quốc Vũ

No.	Name	Date of birth	Height	Weight	Spike	Block
1	(Vietnam) Dương Thị Hên	12 July 1998	1.73 m (5 ft 8 in)	56 kg (123 lb)	296 cm (117 in)	278 cm (109 in)
2	(Vietnam) Đặng Thị Kim Thanh	28 March 1999	1.77 m (5 ft 10 in)	67 kg (148 lb)	290 cm (110 in)	281 cm (111 in)
3	(Vietnam) Trần Thị Thanh Thuý	12 November 1997	1.92 m (6 ft 4 in)	65 kg (143 lb)	304 cm (120 in)	285 cm (112 in)
5	(Vietnam) Huỳnh Thị Hồng Nhung	4 July 1994	1.80 m (5 ft 11 in)	76 kg (168 lb)	288 cm (113 in)	275 cm (108 in)
6	(Vietnam) Nguyễn Thị Bích Trâm	18 April 1990	1.74 m (5 ft 9 in)	56 kg (123 lb)	290 cm (110 in)	282 cm (111 in)
9	(Vietnam) Nguyễn Thị Ngọc Hoa (C)	10 November 1987	1.83 m (6 ft 0 in)	64 kg (141 lb)	305 cm (120 in)	288 cm (113 in)
11	(Vietnam) Trương Thụy Anh Phương	25 February 1999	1.80 m (5 ft 11 in)	65 kg (143 lb)	290 cm (110 in)	277 cm (109 in)
12	(Vietnam) Nguyễn Hoàng Ánh Ngọc	5 December 1994	1.75 m (5 ft 9 in)	289 kg (637 lb)	280 cm (110 in)	281 cm (111 in)
14	(Vietnam) Võ Thị Kim Thoa	18 January 1998	1.72 m (5 ft 8 in)	67 kg (148 lb)	283 cm (111 in)	274 cm (108 in)
16	(Vietnam) Nguyễn Thị Kim Liên	10 February 1993	1.58 m (5 ft 2 in)	53 kg (117 lb)	275 cm (108 in)	271 cm (107 in)

=== Garuda VC ===
The following is the roster of the Indonesia club Garuda VC in the 2018 Asian Club Championship.

Head coach: (Indonesia) Muhammad Ansori

=== Lanka Lions ===
The following is the roster of the Srilanga club Sri Lanka Representative in the 2018 Asian Club Championship.

Head coach: (Sri Lanka) Jayalal Sunith
