= 2019 Asian Women's Club Volleyball Championship squads =

This article shows the rosters of all participating teams at the 2019 Asian Women's Club Volleyball Championship in Tianjin, China.

== Pool A ==
=== Altay VC ===
The following is the roster of the Kazakhstani club Altay VC in the 2019 Asian Club Championship.
Head coach: (Russia) Iurii Panchenko

No.	Name	Date of birth	Height	Weight	Spike	Block
1	(Azerbaijan) Natalya Mammadova	2 December 1984	1.96 m (6 ft 5 in)	78 kg (172 lb)	319 cm (126 in)	302 cm (119 in)
2	(Kazakhstan) Sana Anarkulova (C)	21 July 1989	1.88 m (6 ft 2 in)	72 kg (159 lb)	300 cm (120 in)	295 cm (116 in)
4	(Kazakhstan) Aliya Sadykova	1 August 1988	1.72 m (5 ft 8 in)	60 kg (130 lb)	270 cm (110 in)	260 cm (100 in)
5	(Kazakhstan) Kristina Belova	29 November 1998	1.82 m (6 ft 0 in)	72 kg (159 lb)	244 cm (96 in)	285 cm (112 in)
6	(Kazakhstan) Natalya Akilova	31 May 1993	1.83 m (6 ft 0 in)	62 kg (137 lb)	295 cm (116 in)	275 cm (108 in)
7	(Kazakhstan) Botagoz Sarsenbayeva	16 May 1997	1.75 m (5 ft 9 in)	60 kg (130 lb)	270 cm (110 in)	260 cm (100 in)
8	(Kazakhstan) Tatyana Fendrikova	23 February 1990	1.69 m (5 ft 7 in)	55 kg (121 lb)	280 cm (110 in)	275 cm (108 in)
9	(Russia) Natalia Sharshakova	28 March 1990	1.87 m (6 ft 2 in)	75 kg (165 lb)	300 cm (120 in)	310 cm (120 in)
10	(Serbia) Silvija Popović	15 March 1986	1.78 m (5 ft 10 in)	65 kg (143 lb)	286 cm (113 in)	276 cm (109 in)
11	(Kazakhstan) Alla Politanska	27 September 1988	1.84 m (6 ft 0 in)	63 kg (139 lb)	277 cm (109 in)	265 cm (104 in)
12	(Kazakhstan) Ainagul Aizharikhova	4 September 1994	1.85 m (6 ft 1 in)	65 kg (143 lb)	290 cm (110 in)	280 cm (110 in)
13	(Croatia) Matea Ikić	25 May 1989	1.85 m (6 ft 1 in)	79 kg (174 lb)	290 cm (110 in)	278 cm (109 in)
15	(Kazakhstan) Aidana Oryntayeva	30 June 1999	1.84 m (6 ft 0 in)	68 kg (150 lb)	280 cm (110 in)	285 cm (112 in)
16	(Kazakhstan) Dinara Syzdykova	13 December 1999	1.83 m (6 ft 0 in)	66 kg (146 lb)	285 cm (112 in)	290 cm (110 in)
17	(Kazakhstan) Olga Drobyshevskaya	22 September 1985	1.85 m (6 ft 1 in)	75 kg (165 lb)	305 cm (120 in)	293 cm (115 in)
18	(Kazakhstan) Kristina Anikonova	5 January 1991	1.84 m (6 ft 0 in)	72 kg (159 lb)	290 cm (110 in)	280 cm (110 in)
19	(Puerto Rico) Ana Sofia Jusino	5 January 1994	1.89 m (6 ft 2 in)	65 kg (143 lb)	310 cm (120 in)	294 cm (116 in)
20	(Puerto Rico) Julymar Otero	31 October 1996	1.77 m (5 ft 10 in)	65 kg (143 lb)	235 cm (93 in)	239 cm (94 in)

== Pool B ==
=== Supreme Chonburi ===
The following is the roster of the Thai club Supreme Chonburi in the 2019 Asian Club Championship.
Head coach: (Thailand) Nataphon Srisamutnak

No.	Name	Date of birth	Height	Weight	Spike	Block
1	(Thailand) Supattra Pairoj	27 June 1990	1.60 m (5 ft 3 in)	58 kg (128 lb)	275 cm (108 in)	265 cm (104 in)
2	(Thailand) Piyanut Pannoy	10 November 1989	1.71 m (5 ft 7 in)	62 kg (137 lb)	280 cm (110 in)	275 cm (108 in)
3	(Thailand) Wipawee Srithong	28 January 1999	1.74 m (5 ft 9 in)	64 kg (141 lb)	288 cm (113 in)	266 cm (105 in)
4	(China) Wang Na	25 February 1990	1.78 m (5 ft 10 in)	63 kg (139 lb)	305 cm (120 in)	295 cm (116 in)
5	(Thailand) Pleumjit Thinkaow	9 November 1983	1.80 m (5 ft 11 in)	64 kg (141 lb)	303 cm (119 in)	293 cm (115 in)
8	(Thailand) Tirawan Sang-ob	26 April 1998	1.76 m (5 ft 9 in)	60 kg (130 lb)	285 cm (112 in)	275 cm (108 in)
9	(Indonesia) Aprilia Santini Manganang	27 April 1992	1.70 m (5 ft 7 in)	68 kg (150 lb)	320 cm (130 in)	275 cm (108 in)
10	(Thailand) Wilavan Apinyapong (C)	6 June 1984	1.74 m (5 ft 9 in)	67 kg (148 lb)	294 cm (116 in)	280 cm (110 in)
12	(Thailand) Soraya Phomla	6 August 1992	1.69 m (5 ft 7 in)	60 kg (130 lb)	280 cm (110 in)	270 cm (110 in)
17	(Thailand) Watchareeya Nuanjam	22 July 1996	1.78 m (5 ft 10 in)	64 kg (141 lb)	292 cm (115 in)	279 cm (110 in)
18	(Thailand) Ajcharaporn Kongyot	18 June 1995	1.80 m (5 ft 11 in)	65 kg (143 lb)	298 cm (117 in)	287 cm (113 in)
19	(Thailand) Chatchu-on Moksri	6 November 1999	1.78 m (5 ft 10 in)	68 kg (150 lb)	298 cm (117 in)	290 cm (110 in)
20	(Thailand) Thanacha Sooksod	26 May 2000	1.80 m (5 ft 11 in)	70 kg (150 lb)	283 cm (111 in)	275 cm (108 in)
21	(Thailand) Amporn Hyapha	19 April 1985	1.80 m (5 ft 11 in)	70 kg (150 lb)	301 cm (119 in)	290 cm (110 in)

=== Hisamitsu Springs ===
The following is the roster of the Japanese club Hisamitsu Springs in the 2019 Asian Club Championship.
Head coach: (Japan) Shingo Sakai

No.	Name	Date of birth	Height	Weight	Spike	Block
1	(Japan) Ayano Nakaoji	23 July 1991	1.67 m (5 ft 6 in)	61 kg (134 lb)	290 cm (110 in)	275 cm (108 in)
7	(Japan) Risa Ishibashi (C)	3 February 1990	1.78 m (5 ft 10 in)	65 kg (143 lb)	292 cm (115 in)	284 cm (112 in)
9	(Japan) Hitomi Kodama	26 September 1996	1.79 m (5 ft 10 in)	66 kg (146 lb)	284 cm (112 in)	277 cm (109 in)
10	(Japan) Haruka Kanamori	9 April 1996	1.76 m (5 ft 9 in)	66 kg (146 lb)	297 cm (117 in)	290 cm (110 in)
11	(Japan) Erika Sakae	3 April 1991	1.68 m (5 ft 6 in)	53 kg (117 lb)	273 cm (107 in)	267 cm (105 in)
12	(Japan) Yuka Imamura	2 September 1993	1.75 m (5 ft 9 in)	69 kg (152 lb)	295 cm (116 in)	290 cm (110 in)
13	(Japan) Kiyora Obikawa	31 May 1993	1.83 m (6 ft 0 in)	70 kg (150 lb)	298 cm (117 in)	290 cm (110 in)
14	(Japan) Fumika Moriya	7 April 1992	1.80 m (5 ft 11 in)	75 kg (165 lb)	302 cm (119 in)	285 cm (112 in)
15	(Japan) Yuka Taura	28 June 1998	1.63 m (5 ft 4 in)	63 kg (139 lb)	287 cm (113 in)	270 cm (110 in)
16	(Japan) Asuka Hamamatsu	22 December 1998	1.82 m (6 ft 0 in)	67 kg (148 lb)	304 cm (120 in)	302 cm (119 in)
17	(Japan) Hikari Kato	26 August 1997	1.79 m (5 ft 10 in)	74 kg (163 lb)	297 cm (117 in)	282 cm (111 in)
18	(Japan) Mana Toe	18 May 1994	1.63 m (5 ft 4 in)	60 kg (130 lb)	278 cm (109 in)	264 cm (104 in)
19	(Japan) Akane Ukishima	10 June 1996	1.72 m (5 ft 8 in)	66 kg (146 lb)	286 cm (113 in)	275 cm (108 in)
20	(Japan) Sayaka Tsutsui	29 September 1992	1.58 m (5 ft 2 in)	51 kg (112 lb)	260 cm (100 in)	248 cm (98 in)
22	(Japan) Arisa Inoue	8 May 1995	1.78 m (5 ft 10 in)	67 kg (148 lb)	303 cm (119 in)	282 cm (111 in)
23	(Japan) Minami Higane	2 July 1995	1.68 m (5 ft 6 in)	55 kg (121 lb)	283 cm (111 in)	264 cm (104 in)
24	(Japan) Miyu Nakagawa	8 January 2000	1.82 m (6 ft 0 in)	65 kg (143 lb)	311 cm (122 in)	287 cm (113 in)

=== VTV Bình Điền Long An ===
The following is the roster of the Vietnamese club VTV Bình Điền Long An in the 2019 Asian Club Championship.
Head coach: (Vietnam) Nguyễn Quốc Vũ

No.	Name	Date of birth	Height	Weight	Spike	Block
1	(Vietnam) Dương Thị Hên	15 August 1998	1.74 m (5 ft 9 in)	57 kg (126 lb)	303 cm (119 in)	293 cm (115 in)
2	(Vietnam) Đặng Thị Kim Thanh	28 March 1999	1.77 m (5 ft 10 in)	60 kg (130 lb)	295 cm (116 in)	290 cm (110 in)
3	(Vietnam) Trần Thị Thanh Thúy (C)	12 November 1997	1.92 m (6 ft 4 in)	63 kg (139 lb)	315 cm (124 in)	305 cm (120 in)
4	(Vietnam) Trần Thị Tuyết Hoa	14 April 1991	1.81 m (5 ft 11 in)	63 kg (139 lb)	295 cm (116 in)	280 cm (110 in)
5	(Vietnam) Huỳnh Thị Hồng Nhung	1994	1.82 m (6 ft 0 in)	76 kg (168 lb)	290 cm (110 in)	275 cm (108 in)
6	(Vietnam) Nguyễn Thị Bích Trâm	8 July 1990	1.73 m (5 ft 8 in)	56 kg (123 lb)	290 cm (110 in)	270 cm (110 in)
8	(Vietnam) Đoàn Thị Mỹ Tiên	7 March 2000	1.76 m (5 ft 9 in)	63 kg (139 lb)	295 cm (116 in)	285 cm (112 in)
11	(Vietnam) Nguyễn Khánh Đang	3 October 2000	1.60 m (5 ft 3 in)	60 kg (130 lb)	270 cm (110 in)	260 cm (100 in)
12	(Vietnam) Nguyễn Hoàng Ánh Ngọc	5 December 1994	1.76 m (5 ft 9 in)	66 kg (146 lb)	292 cm (115 in)	287 cm (113 in)
14	(Vietnam) Võ Thị Kim Thoa	1998	1.74 m (5 ft 9 in)	67 kg (148 lb)	280 cm (110 in)	270 cm (110 in)
15	(Vietnam) Phạm Thị Cẩm Linh	13 January 2000	1.77 m (5 ft 10 in)	58 kg (128 lb)	295 cm (116 in)	280 cm (110 in)
16	(Vietnam) Nguyễn Thị Kim Liên	10 February 1993	1.60 m (5 ft 3 in)	60 kg (130 lb)	270 cm (110 in)	258 cm (102 in)
18	(Vietnam) Phạm Thu Hà	6 February 1992	1.75 m (5 ft 9 in)	60 kg (130 lb)	285 cm (112 in)	275 cm (108 in)
