= 2021 Asian Women's Club Volleyball Championship squads =

This article shows the rosters of all participating teams at the 2021 Asian Women's Club Volleyball Championship in Nakhon Ratchasima, Thailand.

== Pool A ==
=== Nakhon Ratchasima ===
The following is the roster of the Thai club Nakhon Ratchasima VC in the 2021 Asian Club Championship.
Head coach: (Thailand) Thanakit Inleang

No.	Name	Date of birth	Height
1	(Thailand) Nuttaporn Sanitklang	August 14, 1991 (aged 30)	1.65 m (5 ft 5 in)
3	(Thailand) Sirima Manakit	January 11, 1991 (aged 30)	1.65 m (5 ft 5 in)
4	(Thailand) Chitaporn Kamlangmak	March 17, 1996 (aged 25)	1.83 m (6 ft 0 in)
6	(Thailand) Kuttitka Kaewpin	August 18, 1994 (aged 27)	1.68 m (5 ft 6 in)
7	(Thailand) Hathairat Jarat	February 9, 1996 (aged 25)	1.81 m (5 ft 11 in)
9	(Thailand) Nokyoong Paowana	March 8, 1997 (aged 24)	1.78 m (5 ft 10 in)
10	(Thailand) Wanitchaya Luangtonglang	October 8, 1992 (aged 28)	1.75 m (5 ft 9 in)
11	(Thailand) Chatsuda Nilapa	December 11, 1998 (aged 22)	1.74 m (5 ft 9 in)
12	(Thailand) Karina Krause	February 11, 1989 (aged 32)	1.77 m (5 ft 10 in)
13	(Thailand) Nootsara Tomkom	July 7, 1985 (aged 36)	1.75 m (5 ft 9 in)
14	(Thailand) Tichaya Boonlert	February 14, 1997 (aged 24)	1.78 m (5 ft 10 in)
16	(Thailand) Kannika Thipachot	May 3, 1993 (aged 28)	1.68 m (5 ft 6 in)
19	(Thailand) Chatchu-on Moksri	November 6, 1999 (aged 21)	1.77 m (5 ft 10 in)
20	(Thailand) Sirikon Singsom	July 27, 2000 (aged 21)	1.58 m (5 ft 2 in)

=== Zhetysu ===
The following is the roster of the Kazakhstani club Zhetysu VC in the 2021 Asian Club Championship.
Head coach: (Kazakhstan) Yelena Pavlova

No.	Name	Date of birth	Height
1	(Kazakhstan) Inna German	January 17, 1983 (aged 38)	1.83 m (6 ft 0 in)
2	(Russia) Valeriya Shatunova	July 12, 1994 (aged 27)	1.91 m (6 ft 3 in)
3	(Kazakhstan) Tatyana Nikitina	January 15, 2001 (aged 20)	1.85 m (6 ft 1 in)
6	(Kazakhstan) Natalya Akilova	May 31, 1993 (aged 28)	1.82 m (6 ft 0 in)
9	(Azerbaijan) Anastasiya Gurbanova	December 4, 1989 (aged 31)	1.90 m (6 ft 3 in)
10	(Kazakhstan) Akerke Shaken	March 6, 2000 (aged 21)	1.68 m (5 ft 6 in)
11	(Kazakhstan) Mariya Masha	November 15, 1999 (aged 21)	1.60 m (5 ft 3 in)
13	(Kazakhstan) Tatyana Mashkova	March 6, 1988 (aged 33)	1.88 m (6 ft 2 in)
14	(Kazakhstan) Svetlana Svetik	September 21, 1990 (aged 31)	1.86 m (6 ft 1 in)
15	(Kazakhstan) Valeriya Chumak	September 20, 1994 (aged 27)	1.89 m (6 ft 2 in)
18	(Senegal) Diouf Mame Fatou	February 2, 1990 (aged 31)	1.89 m (6 ft 2 in)
20	(Kazakhstan) Mariya Trukhina	August 18, 2000 (aged 21)	1.78 m (5 ft 10 in)
21	(Kazakhstan) Tomiris Sagimbayeva	August 1, 2001 (aged 20)	1.71 m (5 ft 7 in)

=== Choco Mucho ===
The following is the roster of the Philippines national team competing as Choco Mucho in the 2021 Asian Club Championship.
Head coach: Odjie Mamon

No.	Name	Date of birth	Height
1	(Philippines) Kalei Mau	October 5, 1995 (aged 25)	1.85 m (6 ft 1 in)
3	(Philippines) Deanna Wong	July 18, 1998 (aged 23)	1.73 m (5 ft 8 in)
7	(Philippines) Mylene Paat	April 5, 1994 (aged 27)	1.80 m (5 ft 11 in)
8	(Philippines) Angelica Cayuna	August 17, 1998 (aged 23)	1.73 m (5 ft 8 in)
11	(United States) MJ Phillips	June 15, 1995 (aged 26)	1.82 m (6 ft 0 in)
13	(Philippines) Dell Palomata	November 1, 1995 (aged 25)	1.86 m (6 ft 1 in)
18	(Philippines) Marivic Meneses	October 18, 1995 (aged 25)	1.81 m (5 ft 11 in)
23	(Philippines) Dawn Macandili	June 1, 1996 (aged 25)	1.53 m (5 ft 0 in)
32	(Philippines) Iris Tolenada	August 21, 1991 (aged 30)	1.70 m (5 ft 7 in)
56	(Philippines) Ernestine Tiamzon	May 4, 1997 (aged 24)	1.73 m (5 ft 8 in)

== Pool B ==
=== Supreme Chonburi ===
The following is the roster of the Thai club Supreme Volleyball Club in the 2021 Asian Club Championship.
Head coach: (Thailand) Nataphon Srisamutnak

No.	Name	Date of birth	Height
1	(Thailand) Supattra Pairoj	June 27, 1990 (aged 31)	1.60 m (5 ft 3 in)
2	(Thailand) Piyanut Pannoy	November 10, 1989 (aged 31)	1.71 m (5 ft 7 in)
3	(Thailand) Wipawee Srithong	January 18, 1999 (aged 22)	1.75 m (5 ft 9 in)
5	(Thailand) Pleumjit Thinkaow	November 3, 1983 (aged 37)	1.80 m (5 ft 11 in)
8	(Thailand) Tirawan Sang-ob	April 26, 1998 (aged 23)	1.80 m (5 ft 11 in)
9	(Thailand) Sutadta Chuewulim	December 12, 1992 (aged 28)	1.75 m (5 ft 9 in)
10	(Thailand) Wilavan Apinyapong	June 6, 1986 (aged 35)	1.74 m (5 ft 9 in)
11	(Thailand) Nampueng Khamart	March 26, 1989 (aged 32)	1.70 m (5 ft 7 in)
13	(Thailand) Natthima Kubkaew	11 July 1999 (aged 22)	1.80 m (5 ft 11 in)
14	(Thailand) Kunyarat Kunyarat	14 October 2002 (aged 18)	1.82 m (6 ft 0 in)
15	(Thailand) Malika Kanthong	8 January 1987 (aged 34)	1.78 m (5 ft 10 in)
16	(Thailand) Waranya Srilaoong	20 October 2002 (aged 18)	1.77 m (5 ft 10 in)
17	(Thailand) Watchareeya Nuanjam	22 June 1996 (aged 25)	1.78 m (5 ft 10 in)
19	(Thailand) Waraporn Poomjaroen	11 August 1985 (aged 36)	1.67 m (5 ft 6 in)
20	(Thailand) Soraya Phomla	6 August 1992 (aged 29)	1.69 m (5 ft 7 in)

=== Altay VC ===
The following is the roster of the Kazakhstani club Altay VC in the 2021 Asian Club Championship.
Head coach: (Serbia) Marko Grsic

No.	Name	Date of birth	Height
2	(Kazakhstan) Sana Anarkulova	July 21, 1989 (aged 32)	1.88 m (6 ft 2 in)
4	(Kazakhstan) Zhanna Syroyeshkina	June 4, 1999 (aged 22)	1.84 m (6 ft 0 in)
3	(Kazakhstan) Zinat Kadyrbekova	April 26, 2002 (aged 19)	1.85 m (6 ft 1 in)
7	(Kazakhstan) Zarina Sitkazinova	March 20, 1993 (aged 28)	1.80 m (5 ft 11 in)
8	(Kazakhstan) Polina Ufimtseva	November 13, 1995 (aged 25)	1.85 m (6 ft 1 in)
9	(Kazakhstan) Lyudmila Issayeva	September 26, 1989 (aged 32)	1.86 m (6 ft 1 in)
10	(Kazakhstan) Irina Kenzhebayeva	February 20, 1992 (aged 29)	1.81 m (5 ft 11 in)
11	(Kazakhstan) Yelizaveta Meister	November 1, 1997 (aged 23)	1.77 m (5 ft 10 in)
12	(Kazakhstan) Zhannel Nogaibayeva	October 7, 2002 (aged 18)	1.72 m (5 ft 8 in)
13	(Kazakhstan) Kristina Belova	November 29, 1998 (aged 22)	1.82 m (6 ft 0 in)
14	(Serbia) Danica Radenković	October 9, 1992 (aged 28)	1.82 m (6 ft 0 in)
15	(Kazakhstan) Madina Beket	November 6, 1999 (aged 21)	1.65 m (5 ft 5 in)
16	(Ukraine) Nadiia Kodola	September 27, 1988 (aged 33)	1.84 m (6 ft 0 in)
18	(Kazakhstan) Kristina Anikonova	January 5, 1991 (aged 30)	1.84 m (6 ft 0 in)

=== Rebisco PH ===
The following is the roster of the Philippines national team competing as Rebisco PH in the 2021 Asian Club Championship.
Head coach: (Brazil) Jorge Edson

No.	Name	Date of birth	Height
2	(Philippines) Abigail Maraño	December 22, 1992 (aged 28)	1.70 m (5 ft 7 in)
4	(Philippines) Mhicaela Belen	June 29, 2002 (aged 19)	1.71 m (5 ft 7 in)
5	(Philippines) Imee Hernandez	November 6, 2000 (aged 20)	1.75 m (5 ft 9 in)
6	(Philippines) Bernadette Pepito	October 27, 2002 (aged 18)	1.57 m (5 ft 2 in)
7	(Philippines) Rhea Dimaculangan	March 21, 1991 (aged 30)	1.71 m (5 ft 7 in)
8	(Philippines) Ejiya Laure	March 20, 1999 (aged 22)	1.73 m (5 ft 8 in)
9	(Philippines) Jennifer Nierva	November 8, 1999 (aged 21)	1.65 m (5 ft 5 in)
10	(Philippines) Mary Joy Baron	December 10, 1995 (aged 25)	1.81 m (5 ft 11 in)
11	(Philippines) Faith Nisperos	January 2, 2000 (aged 21)	1.77 m (5 ft 10 in)
15	(Philippines) Jessica Galanza	November 28, 1996 (aged 24)	1.70 m (5 ft 7 in)
16	(Philippines) Dindin Santiago-Manabat	September 26, 1993 (aged 28)	1.88 m (6 ft 2 in)
17	(Philippines) Kamille Cal	April 25, 2001 (aged 20)	1.70 m (5 ft 7 in)
21	(Philippines) Ivy Lacsina	October 21, 1999 (aged 21)	1.81 m (5 ft 11 in)
26	(Philippines) Kim Kianna Dy	July 16, 1995 (aged 26)	1.79 m (5 ft 10 in)

=== Saipa Tehran ===
The following is the roster of the Iranian club Saipa Tehran in the 2021 Asian Club Championship.
Head coach: (Iran) Maryam Hashemi

No.	Name	Date of birth	Height
1	(Iran) Khajehkolaei Mahdieh	September 13, 1988 (aged 33)	1.79 m (5 ft 10 in)
2	(Iran) Haniyeh Mohtashamipourmatanagh	November 20, 1996 (aged 24)	1.89 m (6 ft 2 in)
3	(Iran) Reihaneh Davar Panah	April 15, 1996 (aged 25)	1.78 m (5 ft 10 in)
4	(Iran) Soudabeh Bagherpour	September 16, 1990 (aged 31)	1.75 m (5 ft 9 in)
6	(Iran) Shabnam Alikhani	September 25, 1992 (aged 29)	1.72 m (5 ft 8 in)
7	(Iran) Mona Ashofteh	February 1, 2001 (aged 20)	1.84 m (6 ft 0 in)
8	(Iran) Mahsa Saberi	February 14, 1993 (aged 28)	1.78 m (5 ft 10 in)
11	(Iran) Mahsa Kadkhoda	June 22, 1993 (aged 28)	1.82 m (6 ft 0 in)
12	(Iran) Ghazaleh Nejati	February 13, 1990 (aged 31)	1.82 m (6 ft 0 in)
13	(Iran) Negar Kiani	August 6, 1992 (aged 29)	1.70 m (5 ft 7 in)
14	(Iran) Pouran Zare	October 23, 1983 (aged 37)	1.86 m (6 ft 1 in)
17	(Iran) Farzaneh Zarei	October 29, 1991 (aged 29)	1.82 m (6 ft 0 in)
18	(Iran) Zahra Bakhshi	June 23, 1997 (aged 24)	1.69 m (5 ft 7 in)
