= 2018 FIVB Volleyball Women's Club World Championship squads =

This article shows the rosters of all participating teams at the 2018 FIVB Volleyball Women's Club World Championship in Shaoxing, China.

== Pool A ==
=== Vakıfbank İstanbul ===
The following is the roster of the Turkish club Vakıfbank İstanbul in the 2018 FIVB Volleyball Women's Club World Championship.

- Head coach: (Italy) Giovanni Guidetti

No.	Name	Date of birth	Height	Weight	Spike	Block
1	(Turkey) Hatice Gizem Örge (L)	26 April 1993	1.70 m (5 ft 7 in)	59 kg (130 lb)	270 cm (110 in)	260 cm (100 in)
3	(Turkey) Cansu Özbay	17 October 1996	1.82 m (6 ft 0 in)	75 kg (165 lb)	285 cm (112 in)	284 cm (112 in)
5	(China) Zhu Ting	29 November 1994	1.98 m (6 ft 6 in)	78 kg (172 lb)	327 cm (129 in)	300 cm (120 in)
6	(Turkey) Kübra Akman	13 October 1994	1.97 m (6 ft 6 in)	89 kg (196 lb)	310 cm (120 in)	310 cm (120 in)
7	(United States) Kelsey Robinson	25 June 1992	1.88 m (6 ft 2 in)	73 kg (161 lb)	307 cm (121 in)	298 cm (117 in)
8	(Turkey) Ayşe Melis Gürkaynak (C)	20 April 1990	1.83 m (6 ft 0 in)	68 kg (150 lb)	300 cm (120 in)	280 cm (110 in)
9	(Turkey) Ayça Aykaç (L)	27 February 1996	1.76 m (5 ft 9 in)	54 kg (119 lb)	280 cm (110 in)	279 cm (110 in)
10	(Netherlands) Lonneke Slöetjes	15 November 1990	1.91 m (6 ft 3 in)	76 kg (168 lb)	322 cm (127 in)	315 cm (124 in)
11	(Turkey) Buket Gülübay	28 February 1999	1.83 m (6 ft 0 in)	68 kg (150 lb)	298 cm (117 in)	281 cm (111 in)
12	(Turkey) Derya Cebecioğlu	24 October 2000	1.85 m (6 ft 1 in)	65 kg (143 lb)	290 cm (110 in)	280 cm (110 in)
15	(Turkey) Ebrar Karakurt	17 January 2000	1.94 m (6 ft 4 in)	72 kg (159 lb)	307 cm (121 in)	305 cm (120 in)
16	(Serbia) Milena Rašić	25 October 1990	1.93 m (6 ft 4 in)	72 kg (159 lb)	315 cm (124 in)	310 cm (120 in)
17	(Turkey) Tuğba Şenoğlu	2 February 1998	1.84 m (6 ft 0 in)	64 kg (141 lb)	275 cm (108 in)	270 cm (110 in)
18	(Turkey) Zehra Güneş	7 July 1999	1.94 m (6 ft 4 in)	82 kg (181 lb)	309 cm (122 in)	255 cm (100 in)

=== Minas Tênis Clube ===
The following is the roster of the Brazilian club Minas Tênis Clube in the 2018 FIVB Volleyball Women's Club World Championship.

- Head coach: (Italy) Stefano Lavarini

No.	Name	Date of birth	Height	Weight	Spike	Block
1	(Brazil) Mara Leão	26 July 1991	1.90 m (6 ft 3 in)	84 kg (185 lb)	320 cm (130 in)	301 cm (119 in)
2	(Brazil) Carol Gattaz (C)	27 July 1981	1.92 m (6 ft 4 in)	78 kg (172 lb)	315 cm (124 in)	299 cm (118 in)
3	(Brazil) Macris Carneiro	3 March 1989	1.78 m (5 ft 10 in)	64 kg (141 lb)	292 cm (115 in)	265 cm (104 in)
5	(Brazil) Maria Cecília de Paula	11 August 1999	1.80 m (5 ft 11 in)	74 kg (163 lb)	297 cm (117 in)	280 cm (110 in)
6	(Brazil) Lana Conceição	8 December 1996	1.78 m (5 ft 10 in)	74 kg (163 lb)	305 cm (120 in)	288 cm (113 in)
7	(Brazil) Maria Luisa de Oliveira	12 December 1992	1.82 m (6 ft 0 in)	73 kg (161 lb)	306 cm (120 in)	286 cm (113 in)
9	(Brazil) Bruna da Silva	3 July 1989	1.81 m (5 ft 11 in)	79 kg (174 lb)	310 cm (120 in)	292 cm (115 in)
10	(Brazil) Gabriela Guimarães	19 May 1994	1.80 m (5 ft 11 in)	65 kg (143 lb)	305 cm (120 in)	289 cm (114 in)
12	(Brazil) Natália Pereira	4 April 1989	1.86 m (6 ft 1 in)	83 kg (183 lb)	311 cm (122 in)	295 cm (116 in)
15	(Brazil) Georgia Cattani	9 March 1997	1.60 m (5 ft 3 in)	64 kg (141 lb)	290 cm (110 in)	272 cm (107 in)
16	(Brazil) Monique de Jesus	27 August 2001	1.82 m (6 ft 0 in)	73 kg (161 lb)	298 cm (117 in)	292 cm (115 in)
18	(Brazil) Mayany de Souza	24 November 1996	1.85 m (6 ft 1 in)	72 kg (159 lb)	293 cm (115 in)	282 cm (111 in)
19	(Brazil) Léia Silva (L)	1 March 1985	1.60 m (5 ft 3 in)	60 kg (130 lb)	275 cm (108 in)	269 cm (106 in)
20	(Brazil) Bruna Costa	30 January 1995	1.70 m (5 ft 7 in)	70 kg (150 lb)	282 cm (111 in)	267 cm (105 in)

=== Zhejiang WVC ===
The following is the roster of the Chinese club Zhejiang WVC in the 2018 FIVB Volleyball Women's Club World Championship.

- Head coach: (China) Wang Hebin

No.	Name	Date of birth	Height	Weight	Spike	Block
1	(China) Yang Hanyu	12 October 1999	1.92 m (6 ft 4 in)	72 kg (159 lb)	317 cm (125 in)	311 cm (122 in)
2	(China) Yu Shiyu	25 March 1999	1.89 m (6 ft 2 in)	68 kg (150 lb)	310 cm (120 in)	300 cm (120 in)
3	(China) Jiang Yuxiao	24 July 1993	1.80 m (5 ft 11 in)	67 kg (148 lb)	305 cm (120 in)	298 cm (117 in)
4	(China) Wang Na (C)	25 February 1990	1.78 m (5 ft 10 in)	63 kg (139 lb)	305 cm (120 in)	295 cm (116 in)
5	(China) Li Ying	14 January 1995	1.93 m (6 ft 4 in)	68 kg (150 lb)	308 cm (121 in)	300 cm (120 in)
6	(China) Zhu Yuezhou	27 March 1995	1.87 m (6 ft 2 in)	70 kg (150 lb)	306 cm (120 in)	296 cm (117 in)
7	(China) Lan Jiali	22 August 1998	1.77 m (5 ft 10 in)	62 kg (137 lb)	302 cm (119 in)	296 cm (117 in)
9	(China) Liu Yanhan	19 January 1993	1.88 m (6 ft 2 in)	75 kg (165 lb)	315 cm (124 in)	305 cm (120 in)
10	(China) Ren Kaiyi	14 December 1991	1.82 m (6 ft 0 in)	71 kg (157 lb)	305 cm (120 in)	295 cm (116 in)
13	(China) Liu Yu	13 May 2001	1.90 m (6 ft 3 in)	65 kg (143 lb)	307 cm (121 in)	300 cm (120 in)
14	(China) Wang Mengjie (L)	14 November 1995	1.72 m (5 ft 8 in)	65 kg (143 lb)	289 cm (114 in)	280 cm (110 in)
15	(China) Wang Huimin (L)	11 November 1992	1.84 m (6 ft 0 in)	67 kg (148 lb)	304 cm (120 in)	295 cm (116 in)
16	(China) Wang Mengyue	20 August 1998	1.88 m (6 ft 2 in)	90 kg (200 lb)	306 cm (120 in)	297 cm (117 in)
17	(China) Shen Jiarong	4 November 2000	1.80 m (5 ft 11 in)	60 kg (130 lb)	302 cm (119 in)	290 cm (110 in)

=== Volero Le Cannet ===
The following is the roster of the French club Volero Le Cannet in the 2018 FIVB Volleyball Women's Club World Championship.

- Head coach: (Netherlands) Avital Selinger

No.	Name	Date of birth	Height	Weight	Spike	Block
1	(Russia) Angelina Lazarenko	13 April 1998	1.93 m (6 ft 4 in)	80 kg (180 lb)	320 cm (130 in)	305 cm (120 in)
3	(Cuba) Heidy Casanova	6 November 1998	1.84 m (6 ft 0 in)	78 kg (172 lb)	244 cm (96 in)	240 cm (94 in)
5	(Bulgaria) Gergana Dimitrova	28 February 1996	1.84 m (6 ft 0 in)	71 kg (157 lb)	305 cm (120 in)	288 cm (113 in)
6	(France) Déborah Ortschitt	10 June 1987	1.65 m (5 ft 5 in)	55 kg (121 lb)	292 cm (115 in)	280 cm (110 in)
7	(Azerbaijan) Olena Hasanova	25 November 1995	1.87 m (6 ft 2 in)	72 kg (159 lb)	305 cm (120 in)	300 cm (120 in)
8	(Bulgaria) Mira Todorova	12 April 1994	1.87 m (6 ft 2 in)	70 kg (150 lb)	312 cm (123 in)	300 cm (120 in)
9	(Cuba) Liset Herrera	6 December 1998	1.92 m (6 ft 4 in)	70 kg (150 lb)	311 cm (122 in)	300 cm (120 in)
10	(Serbia) Ana Bjelica	3 April 1992	1.90 m (6 ft 3 in)	78 kg (172 lb)	310 cm (120 in)	305 cm (120 in)
11	(Slovenia) Eva Mori	13 March 1996	1.86 m (6 ft 1 in)	67 kg (148 lb)	305 cm (120 in)	275 cm (108 in)
12	(Russia) Rosir Calderón	28 December 1984	1.91 m (6 ft 3 in)	76 kg (168 lb)	330 cm (130 in)	325 cm (128 in)
13	(Russia) Anastasia Kornienko	9 September 1992	1.83 m (6 ft 0 in)	68 kg (150 lb)	295 cm (116 in)	290 cm (110 in)
15	(France) Joyce Agbolossou	15 January 2002	1.83 m (6 ft 0 in)	68 kg (150 lb)	300 cm (120 in)	290 cm (110 in)
16	(France) Amandine Giardino (L)	30 March 1995	1.72 m (5 ft 8 in)	65 kg (143 lb)	275 cm (108 in)	260 cm (100 in)
17	(Switzerland) Laura Unternährer (C)	11 July 1993	1.79 m (5 ft 10 in)	70 kg (150 lb)	303 cm (119 in)	283 cm (111 in)

== Pool B ==
=== Eczacıbaşı VitrA İstanbul ===
The following is the roster of the Turkish club Eczacıbaşı VitrA İstanbul in the 2018 FIVB Volleyball Women's Club World Championship.

- Head coach: (Brazil) Marco Aurélio Motta

No.	Name	Date of birth	Height	Weight	Spike	Block
1	(Turkey) Güldeniz Önal	25 March 1986	1.83 m (6 ft 0 in)	75 kg (165 lb)	302 cm (119 in)	293 cm (115 in)
2	(Turkey) Meliha İsmailoğlu	17 September 1993	1.88 m (6 ft 2 in)	73 kg (161 lb)	301 cm (119 in)	290 cm (110 in)
3	(Serbia) Tijana Bošković	8 March 1997	1.93 m (6 ft 4 in)	82 kg (181 lb)	315 cm (124 in)	300 cm (120 in)
4	(Turkey) Beyza Arıcı	27 July 1995	1.92 m (6 ft 4 in)	82 kg (181 lb)	302 cm (119 in)	293 cm (115 in)
5	(Turkey) Simge Şebnem Aköz (L)	23 April 1991	1.68 m (5 ft 6 in)	55 kg (121 lb)	250 cm (98 in)	245 cm (96 in)
6	(United States) Lauren Gibbemeyer	8 September 1988	1.87 m (6 ft 2 in)	71 kg (157 lb)	307 cm (121 in)	293 cm (115 in)
8	(Turkey) Gamze Alikaya	1 January 1993	1.79 m (5 ft 10 in)	62 kg (137 lb)	295 cm (116 in)	290 cm (110 in)
9	(Turkey) Büşra Kılıçlı	15 November 1990	1.91 m (6 ft 3 in)	76 kg (168 lb)	322 cm (127 in)	315 cm (124 in)
10	(United States) Jordan Larson (C)	16 October 1986	1.88 m (6 ft 2 in)	75 kg (165 lb)	302 cm (119 in)	295 cm (116 in)
11	(Turkey) Ezgi Dilik	12 June 1995	1.76 m (5 ft 9 in)	78 kg (172 lb)	282 cm (111 in)	287 cm (113 in)
14	(Turkey) Gözde Yılmaz	9 September 1991	1.94 m (6 ft 4 in)	77 kg (170 lb)	315 cm (124 in)	310 cm (120 in)
15	(Turkey) Merve Atlıer	31 March 2000	1.91 m (6 ft 3 in)	75 kg (165 lb)	310 cm (120 in)	296 cm (117 in)
17	(Turkey) Dilara Bağcı (L)	2 February 1994	1.66 m (5 ft 5 in)	63 kg (139 lb)	280 cm (110 in)	274 cm (108 in)
18	(South Korea) Kim Yeon-koung	26 February 1988	1.92 m (6 ft 4 in)	73 kg (161 lb)	350 cm (140 in)	340 cm (130 in)

=== Praia Clube ===
The following is the roster of the Brazilian club Praia Clube in the 2018 FIVB Volleyball Women's Club World Championship.

- Head coach: (Brazil) Paulo Coco

No.	Name	Date of birth	Height	Weight	Spike	Block
1	(Brazil) Fabiana Claudino (C)	24 January 1985	1.93 m (6 ft 4 in)	76 kg (168 lb)	314 cm (124 in)	293 cm (115 in)
3	(United States) Carli Lloyd	6 August 1989	1.80 m (5 ft 11 in)	75 kg (165 lb)	313 cm (123 in)	295 cm (116 in)
7	(Brazil) Ellen Braga	12 June 1991	1.78 m (5 ft 10 in)	65 kg (143 lb)	288 cm (113 in)	284 cm (112 in)
8	(Brazil) Ana Paula da Cruz	20 October 1993	1.87 m (6 ft 2 in)	76 kg (168 lb)	305 cm (120 in)	290 cm (110 in)
9	(Brazil) Rosamaria Montibeller	9 April 1994	1.85 m (6 ft 1 in)	76 kg (168 lb)	291 cm (115 in)	285 cm (112 in)
10	(Brazil) Michelle Pavão	31 October 1986	1.78 m (5 ft 10 in)	62 kg (137 lb)	295 cm (116 in)	283 cm (111 in)
11	(United States) Nicole Fawcett	16 December 1986	1.91 m (6 ft 3 in)	82 kg (181 lb)	310 cm (120 in)	291 cm (115 in)
12	(Brazil) Lais Vasques (L)	12 February 1996	1.71 m (5 ft 7 in)	70 kg (150 lb)	275 cm (108 in)	274 cm (108 in)
13	(Brazil) Francyne Jacintho	16 July 1992	1.90 m (6 ft 3 in)	66 kg (146 lb)	304 cm (120 in)	243 cm (96 in)
14	(Brazil) Ananda Marinho	2 May 1989	0 m (0 in)	0 kg (0 lb)	0 cm (0 in)	0 cm (0 in)
15	(Brazil) Ana Carolina da Silva	8 April 1991	1.83 m (6 ft 0 in)	73 kg (161 lb)	290 cm (110 in)	290 cm (110 in)
16	(Brazil) Fernanda Garay	10 May 1986	1.79 m (5 ft 10 in)	74 kg (163 lb)	308 cm (121 in)	288 cm (113 in)
17	(Brazil) Suelen Pinto (L)	4 October 1987	1.66 m (5 ft 5 in)	81 kg (179 lb)	256 cm (101 in)	238 cm (94 in)

=== Supreme Chonburi ===
The following is the roster of the Thai club Supreme Chonburi in the 2018 FIVB Volleyball Women's Club World Championship.

- Head coach: (Thailand) Nataphon Srisamutnak

No.	Name	Date of birth	Height	Weight	Spike	Block
1	(Thailand) Supattra Pairoj (L)	27 June 1990	1.60 m (5 ft 3 in)	58 kg (128 lb)	275 cm (108 in)	265 cm (104 in)
2	(Thailand) Piyanut Pannoy (L)	10 November 1989	1.71 m (5 ft 7 in)	62 kg (137 lb)	280 cm (110 in)	275 cm (108 in)
3	(Thailand) Wipawee Srithong	28 January 1999	1.74 m (5 ft 9 in)	65 kg (143 lb)	288 cm (113 in)	266 cm (105 in)
4	(Thailand) Sasiwimol Sangpan	27 January 1995	1.76 m (5 ft 9 in)	67 kg (148 lb)	293 cm (115 in)	275 cm (108 in)
5	(Thailand) Pleumjit Thinkaow	9 November 1983	1.80 m (5 ft 11 in)	67 kg (148 lb)	303 cm (119 in)	283 cm (111 in)
7	(Thailand) Patcharaporn Sittisad	20 February 1996	1.65 m (5 ft 5 in)	52 kg (115 lb)	278 cm (109 in)	263 cm (104 in)
8	(Thailand) Tirawan Sang-ob	26 April 1998	1.76 m (5 ft 9 in)	60 kg (130 lb)	285 cm (112 in)	275 cm (108 in)
10	(Thailand) Wilavan Apinyapong (C)	6 June 1984	1.74 m (5 ft 9 in)	70 kg (150 lb)	294 cm (116 in)	282 cm (111 in)
11	(Thailand) Nampueng Khamart	26 March 1989	1.70 m (5 ft 7 in)	65 kg (143 lb)	235 cm (93 in)	230 cm (91 in)
12	(Thailand) Soraya Phomla	6 August 1992	1.69 m (5 ft 7 in)	60 kg (130 lb)	280 cm (110 in)	270 cm (110 in)
14	(Thailand) Pattiya Juangjan	16 January 1998	1.73 m (5 ft 8 in)	64 kg (141 lb)	288 cm (113 in)	274 cm (108 in)
15	(Thailand) Waraporn Poomjaroen	11 August 1985	1.67 m (5 ft 6 in)	61 kg (134 lb)	275 cm (108 in)	262 cm (103 in)
17	(Thailand) Watchareeya Nuanjam	22 July 1996	1.77 m (5 ft 10 in)	64 kg (141 lb)	292 cm (115 in)	279 cm (110 in)
20	(Thailand) Thanacha Sooksod	26 May 2000	1.80 m (5 ft 11 in)	70 kg (150 lb)	283 cm (111 in)	275 cm (108 in)

=== Altay VC ===
The following is the roster of the Kazakh club Altay VC in the 2018 FIVB Volleyball Women's Club World Championship.

- Head coach: (Russia) Yury Panchenko

No.	Name	Date of birth	Height	Weight	Spike	Block
1	(Azerbaijan) Natalya Mammadova	2 December 1984	1.96 m (6 ft 5 in)	78 kg (172 lb)	319 cm (126 in)	302 cm (119 in)
2	(Kazakhstan) Sana Anarkulova (C)	21 July 1989	1.88 m (6 ft 2 in)	77 kg (170 lb)	300 cm (120 in)	280 cm (110 in)
4	(Kazakhstan) Aliya Sadykova (L)	1 August 1988	1.74 m (5 ft 9 in)	63 kg (139 lb)	293 cm (115 in)	281 cm (111 in)
5	(Kazakhstan) Kristina Belova	29 November 1998	1.82 m (6 ft 0 in)	72 kg (159 lb)	244 cm (96 in)	285 cm (112 in)
6	(Kazakhstan) Natalya Akilova	31 May 1993	1.83 m (6 ft 0 in)	62 kg (137 lb)	295 cm (116 in)	285 cm (112 in)
7	(Kazakhstan) Botagoz Sarsenbayeva	16 May 1997	1.72 m (5 ft 8 in)	56 kg (123 lb)	265 cm (104 in)	257 cm (101 in)
8	(Kazakhstan) Tatyana Fendrikova	23 February 1990	1.69 m (5 ft 7 in)	55 kg (121 lb)	280 cm (110 in)	275 cm (108 in)
9	(Kazakhstan) Natalia Sharshakova	28 March 1990	1.87 m (6 ft 2 in)	78 kg (172 lb)	315 cm (124 in)	300 cm (120 in)
10	(Serbia) Silvija Popović (L)	15 March 1986	1.78 m (5 ft 10 in)	65 kg (143 lb)	286 cm (113 in)	276 cm (109 in)
13	(Croatia) Matea Ikić	25 May 1989	1.85 m (6 ft 1 in)	79 kg (174 lb)	290 cm (110 in)	278 cm (109 in)
15	(Kazakhstan) Aidana Oryntayeva	30 June 1999	1.84 m (6 ft 0 in)	68 kg (150 lb)	280 cm (110 in)	285 cm (112 in)
17	(Kazakhstan) Olga Drobyshevskaya	22 September 1985	1.85 m (6 ft 1 in)	75 kg (165 lb)	305 cm (120 in)	293 cm (115 in)
18	(Kazakhstan) Kristina Anikonova	5 January 1991	1.83 m (6 ft 0 in)	73 kg (161 lb)	295 cm (116 in)	285 cm (112 in)
19	(Puerto Rico) Ana Sofía Jusino	5 January 1994	1.89 m (6 ft 2 in)	65 kg (143 lb)	310 cm (120 in)	294 cm (116 in)
