= 2022 Asian Women's Club Volleyball Championship squads =

This article shows the rosters of all participating teams at the 2022 Asian Women's Club Volleyball Championship in Semey, Kazakhstan.

== Altay VC ==
The following is the roster of the Kazakhstani club Altay VC in the 2022 Asian Club Championship.
Head coach: (Serbia) Marko Grsic

No.	Name	Date of birth	Height
2	(Kazakhstan) Sana Anarkulova (c)	July 21, 1989 (aged 32)	1.88 m (6 ft 2 in)
5	(Kazakhstan) Botagoz Yessimkhan	May 16, 1997 (aged 24)	1.72 m (5 ft 8 in)
6	(Kazakhstan) Saniya Balagazinova	November 16, 2002 (aged 19)	1.79 m (5 ft 10 in)
7	(Kazakhstan) Zarina Sitkazinova	March 20, 1993 (aged 29)	1.80 m (5 ft 11 in)
8	(Kazakhstan) Polina Ufimtseva	November 13, 1995 (aged 26)	1.85 m (6 ft 1 in)
9	(Kazakhstan) Lyudmila Issayeva	September 26, 1989 (aged 32)	1.86 m (6 ft 1 in)
10	(Kazakhstan) Irina Kenzhebayeva	February 20, 1992 (aged 30)	1.81 m (5 ft 11 in)
11	(Kazakhstan) Yelizaveta Meister	November 1, 1997 (aged 24)	1.77 m (5 ft 10 in)
13	(Kazakhstan) Kristina Belova	November 29, 1998 (aged 23)	1.82 m (6 ft 0 in)
14	(Serbia) Danica Radenković	October 9, 1992 (aged 29)	1.82 m (6 ft 0 in)
15	(Kazakhstan) Madina Beket	November 6, 1999 (aged 22)	1.65 m (5 ft 5 in)
16	(Ukraine) Nadiia Kodola	September 27, 1988 (aged 33)	1.84 m (6 ft 0 in)
17	(Kazakhstan) Nuray Onerbekkyzy	June 9, 2006 (aged 15)	1.85 m (6 ft 1 in)
18	(Kazakhstan) Kristina Anikonova	January 5, 1991 (aged 31)	1.84 m (6 ft 0 in)

== Barij Essence ==
The following is the roster of the Iranian club Barij Essence in the 2022 Asian Club Championship.
Head coach: (Iran) Fatemeh Shabankhamseh

No.	Name	Date of birth	Height
1	(Iran) Mahdieh Khajehkolaei	September 13, 1988 (aged 33)	1.79 m (5 ft 10 in)
2	(Iran) Haniyeh Mohtashamipourmatanagh	November 20, 1996 (aged 25)	1.89 m (6 ft 2 in)
3	(Iran) Samaneh Siavashi	July 4, 1993 (aged 28)	1.76 m (5 ft 9 in)
6	(Iran) Shabnam Alikhani	September 25, 1992 (aged 29)	1.71 m (5 ft 7 in)
7	(Iran) Mona Ashofteh	January 2, 2001 (aged 21)	1.84 m (6 ft 0 in)
9	(Iran) Zahra Karimi	February 15, 2002 (aged 20)	1.84 m (6 ft 0 in)
10	(Iran) Haleh Motaghiyan	November 6, 1997 (aged 24)	1.68 m (5 ft 6 in)
11	(Iran) Mahsa Kadkhoda (c)	June 22, 1993 (aged 28)	1.83 m (6 ft 0 in)
12	(Iran) Zahra Salehi	March 25, 2001 (aged 21)	1.82 m (6 ft 0 in)
13	(Iran) Negar Kiani	June 8, 1992 (aged 29)	1.70 m (5 ft 7 in)
14	(Iran) Zoya Khaleghi	May 25, 1993 (aged 28)	1.81 m (5 ft 11 in)
15	(Iran) (Turkey) Aytak Salamatgharamaleki	December 31, 2000 (aged 21)	1.88 m (6 ft 2 in)
16	(Iran) Maryam Habibi	April 17, 2001 (aged 21)	1.80 m (5 ft 11 in)
18	(Iran) Elaheh Poorsaleh shahdehsari	April 26, 2003 (aged 18)	1.83 m (6 ft 0 in)

== Diamond Food–Fine Chef Sport Club ==
The following is the roster of the Thai club Diamond Food–Fine Chef Sport Club in the 2022 Asian Club Championship.
Head coach: (Thailand) Kittikun Sriutthawong

No.	Name	Date of birth	Height
2	(Thailand) Tikamporn Changkeaw	December 12, 1984 (aged 37)	1.68 m (5 ft 6 in)
3	(Thailand) Patcharaporn Sittisad	February 20, 1996 (aged 26)	1.65 m (5 ft 5 in)
5	(Thailand) Karina Krause	February 11, 1989 (aged 33)	1.77 m (5 ft 10 in)
8	(Thailand) Kaewkalaya Kamulthala	August 7, 1994 (aged 27)	1.78 m (5 ft 10 in)
9	(Thailand) Sasiwimol Sangpan	January 27, 1995 (aged 27)	1.76 m (5 ft 9 in)
11	(Thailand) Sasipaporn Janthawisut	June 10, 1997 (aged 24)	1.75 m (5 ft 9 in)
13	(Thailand) Nootsara Tomkom (c)	July 7, 1985 (aged 36)	1.69 m (5 ft 7 in)
14	(Brazil) Fernanda Tomé	December 10, 1989 (aged 32)	1.95 m (6 ft 5 in)
15	(Thailand) Kanjana Kuthaisong	April 11, 1997 (aged 25)	1.75 m (5 ft 9 in)
17	(Thailand) Gullapa Piampongsan	March 17, 1991 (aged 31)	1.76 m (5 ft 9 in)
18	(Cuba) Liannes Castañeda Simon	October 18, 1986 (aged 35)	1.88 m (6 ft 2 in)
19	(Thailand) Thanacha Sooksod	May 26, 2000 (aged 21)	1.80 m (5 ft 11 in)
22	(Thailand) Aurairat Laolaem	July 4, 1999 (aged 22)	1.65 m (5 ft 5 in)
24	(Thailand) Natthanicha Jaisaen	May 21, 1998 (aged 23)	1.71 m (5 ft 7 in)

== Jizzakh State Pedagogical Institute ==
The following is the roster of the Uzbekistani club Jizzakh State Pedagogical Institute in the 2022 Asian Club Championship.
Head coach: (Uzbekistan) Kholmuminov Bakhriddin

No.	Name	Date of birth	Height
1	(Uzbekistan) Khurshidabonu Rustamova	August 16, 2002 (aged 19)	1.81 m (5 ft 11 in)
2	(Uzbekistan) Sevdora Azimova	September 25, 2002 (aged 19)	1.78 m (5 ft 10 in)
3	(Uzbekistan) Khodisakhon Toshkenboeva	October 22, 2001 (aged 20)	1.80 m (5 ft 11 in)
4	(Uzbekistan) Ezozakhon Sativoldieva	December 25, 2000 (aged 21)	1.76 m (5 ft 9 in)
6	(Uzbekistan) Nodira Sultanboeva	November 16, 1997 (aged 24)	1.69 m (5 ft 7 in)
7	(Uzbekistan) Zarnigora Askarova	August 23, 1996 (aged 25)	1.80 m (5 ft 11 in)
8	(Uzbekistan) Dilfuza Kholnazarova	January 16, 2001 (aged 21)	1.82 m (6 ft 0 in)
9	(Uzbekistan) Zukhra Esirgapova	January 26, 2003 (aged 19)	1.68 m (5 ft 6 in)
10	(Uzbekistan) Nozima Mavlonova	December 23, 2001 (aged 20)	1.68 m (5 ft 6 in)
12	(Uzbekistan) Oyatkhon Yokubova (c)	January 4, 1999 (aged 23)	1.82 m (6 ft 0 in)
14	(Uzbekistan) Aziza Joldasbaeva	January 20, 1997 (aged 25)	1.81 m (5 ft 11 in)

== Kuanysh VC ==
The following is the roster of the Kazakhstani club Kuanysh VC in the 2022 Asian Club Championship.
Head coach: (Serbia) Dobreskov Darko

No.	Name	Date of birth	Height
1	(Russia) Elena Samoylova	August 7, 1988 (aged 33)	1.88 m (6 ft 2 in)
2	(Kazakhstan) Sabira Bekisheva	February 21, 1998 (aged 24)	1.70 m (5 ft 7 in)
3	(Kazakhstan) Natalya Smirnova	December 29, 1999 (aged 22)	1.84 m (6 ft 0 in)
4	(Kazakhstan) Ekaterina Mikhailova	May 4, 1998 (aged 23)	1.85 m (6 ft 1 in)
5	(Ukraine) Karyna Denysova	December 28, 1997 (aged 24)	1.84 m (6 ft 0 in)
7	(Kazakhstan) Tatyana Aldoshina (c)	April 23, 1998 (aged 24)	1.85 m (6 ft 1 in)
13	(Kazakhstan) Yana Petrenko	July 30, 1990 (aged 31)	1.81 m (5 ft 11 in)
14	(Serbia) Aleksandra Ćirović	September 30, 1997 (aged 24)	1.75 m (5 ft 9 in)
17	(Kazakhstan) Margarita Belchenko	March 21, 1999 (aged 23)	1.77 m (5 ft 10 in)
18	(Kazakhstan) Anastassiya Kolomoets	April 18, 1991 (aged 31)	1.82 m (6 ft 0 in)
19	(Kazakhstan) Nailya Nigmatulina	November 13, 1996 (aged 25)	1.78 m (5 ft 10 in)
20	(Kazakhstan) Kristina Shvidkaya	January 3, 2002 (aged 20)	1.63 m (5 ft 4 in)

== Kyrgyzstan VC ==
The following is the roster of the Kyrgyzstani club Kyrgyzstan VC in the 2022 Asian Club Championship.
Head coach: Aisakhodzhiev Abdukhamid

No.	Name	Date of birth	Height
1	(Kyrgyzstan) Burulsun Sharapidinova	September 11, 1997 (aged 24)	1.62 m (5 ft 4 in)
2	(Kyrgyzstan) Adina Mamatzhan Kyzy	September 28, 2001 (aged 20)	1.80 m (5 ft 11 in)
5	(Kyrgyzstan) Madina Mirlan Kyzy	July 17, 1995 (aged 26)	1.72 m (5 ft 8 in)
6	(Kyrgyzstan) Aidai Kadyrova (c)	July 1, 1991 (aged 30)	1.80 m (5 ft 11 in)
7	(Kyrgyzstan) Ogulai Kudaikulova	February 18, 2002 (aged 20)	1.75 m (5 ft 9 in)
8	(Kyrgyzstan) Marsel Mamytova	June 8, 2000 (aged 21)	1.80 m (5 ft 11 in)
10	(Kyrgyzstan) Nurselia Chorobaeva	November 5, 2002 (aged 19)	1.80 m (5 ft 11 in)
11	(Kyrgyzstan) Roza Rasulbek Kyzy	October 4, 2005 (aged 16)	1.84 m (6 ft 0 in)
13	(Kyrgyzstan) Alena Shelemeteva	October 19, 1998 (aged 23)	1.70 m (5 ft 7 in)
14	(Kyrgyzstan) Anastasiia Gorlova	May 14, 2000 (aged 21)	1.85 m (6 ft 1 in)
16	(Kyrgyzstan) Kamila Kumarbekova	July 18, 2004 (aged 17)	1.82 m (6 ft 0 in)
18	(Kyrgyzstan) Aiturgan Aitbekova	September 21, 2006 (aged 15)	1.84 m (6 ft 0 in)
