= 2018 Asian Women's Club Volleyball Championship =

19th Asian Women's Club Volleyball Championship event

Tournament details
- Host country: Kazakhstan
- City: Ust-Kamenogorsk
- Dates: 11–18 July
- Teams: 9 (from 1 confederation)

Final positions
- Champions: (Thailand) Supreme Chonburi (2nd title)
- Runners-up: (Japan) NEC Red Rockets
- Third place: (China) Jiangsu Zenith Steel
- Fourth place: (Kazakhstan) Altay

Tournament awards
- MVP: (Thailand) Ajcharaporn Kongyot (Supreme Chonburi)

The 2018 Asian Women's Club Volleyball Championship was the 19th edition of the Asian Women's Club Volleyball Championship, an international volleyball club tournament organised by the Asian Volleyball Confederation (AVC) with the Volleyball Federation of the Republic of Kazakhstan (VFRK). It was held in Ust-Kamenogorsk, Kazakhstan from 11 to 18 July 2018. The tournament served as the Asian qualifiers for the 2019 FIVB Volleyball Women's Club World Championship with the champion qualifying for the World Championship.

== Qualification ==
Nine clubs from nine AVC member associations participated in the tournament including Kazakhstan, the host country. Of the nine AVC member associations, seven had clubs which participated in the 2017 edition.

=== Qualified teams ===
The following teams qualified for the tournament.

Association	Team	Means of qualification
Kazakhstan	Altay	2017–18 Kazakhstan National Liga winners
China	Jiangsu Zenith Steel	2016–17 Chinese Volleyball League winners
Chinese Taipei	CMFC	2017–18 Enterprise Volleyball League winners
Indonesia	Garuda VC	2018 Indonesian Proliga winners
Iran	Paykan Tehran VC	2017 Iranian Volleyball League Champions
Japan	NEC Red Rockets	2016–17 V.Premier League winners
Sri Lanka	Lanka Lions	2017 Sri Lanka Volleyball League Champions
Thailand	Supreme Chonburi	2017–18 Volleyball Thailand League winners
Vietnam	VTV Bình Điền Long An	2017 Volleyball Vietnam League winners

== Pools composition ==
This is the first Asian Women's Club Volleyball Championship which will use the new competition format. Following the 2017 AVC Board of Administration's unanimous decision, the new format will see teams being drawn into four pools up to the total amount of the participating teams. Each team as well as the host side will be assigned into a pool according to their 2017 ranking. The three best-ranked teams will be drawn in the same Pool A, the next best four will contest Pool B, the next best three will contest Pool C.

Pool A	Pool B	Pool C
Thailand (1)	Kazakhstan (4)	Vietnam (7)
Japan (2)	Chinese Taipei (5)	Indonesia (–)
China (3)	Iran (6)	Sri Lanka (–)

== Preliminary round ==
- All times are in Kazakhstan Standard Time (UTC+06:00).

=== Pool standing procedure ===
1. Number of matches won
2. Match points
3. Sets ratio
4. Points ratio
5. Result of the last match between the tied teams

Match won 3–0 or 3–1: 3 match points for the winner, 0 match points for the loser
Match won 3–2: 2 match points for the winner, 1 match point for the loser
Match forfeited: 0 match points for each.

=== Pool A ===
Pos	Team	Pld	W	L	Pts	SW	SL	SR	SPW	SPL	SPR	Qualification
1	(Japan) NEC Red Rockets	2	2	0	5	6	3	2.000	207	199	1.040	Quarter-finals
2	(Thailand) Supreme Chonburi	2	1	1	4	5	3	1.667	176	159	1.107	Quarter-finals
3	(China) Jiangsu Zenith Steel	2	0	2	0	1	6	0.167	151	176	0.858	Quarter-finals

Updated to match(es) played on unknown. Source: AVC
Rules for classification: Pool standing procedure

Date	Time		Score		Set 1	Set 2	Set 3	Set 4	Set 5	Total	Report
11 Jul	15:00	Supreme Chonburi (Thailand)	3–0	(China) Jiangsu Zenith Steel	25–20	25–22	25–11			75–53	Report
12 Jul	15:00	NEC Red Rockets (Japan)	3–2	(Thailand) Supreme Chonburi	20–25	21–25	25–22	25–18	15–11	106–101	Report
13 Jul	15:00	Jiangsu Zenith Steel (China)	1–3	(Japan) NEC Red Rockets	25–21	24–26	27–29	22–25		98–101	Report

=== Pool B ===
Pos	Team	Pld	W	L	Pts	SW	SL	SR	SPW	SPL	SPR	
1	(Kazakhstan) Altay	2	2	0	6	6	1	6.000	171	130	1.315	Quarter-finals
2	(Chinese Taipei) CMFC	2	1	1	2	4	5	0.800	184	198	0.929	Play-offs
3	(Iran) Paykan Tehran VC	2	0	2	1	2	6	0.333	153	180	0.850	Quarter-finals

Updated to match(es) played on unknown. Source: AVC
Rules for classification: Pool standing procedure

Date	Time		Score		Set 1	Set 2	Set 3	Set 4	Set 5	Total	Report
11 Jul	18:30	Paykan Tehran VC (Iran)	0–3	(Kazakhstan) Altay	18–25	16–25	17–25			51–75	Report
12 Jul	18:30	CMFC (Chinese Taipei)	3–2	(Iran) Paykan Tehran VC	24–26	26–24	15–25	25–16	15–11	105–102	Report
13 Jul	19:00	Altay (Kazakhstan)	3–1	(Chinese Taipei) CMFC	21–25	25–18	25–13	25–23		96–79	Report

=== Pool C ===
Pos	Team	Pld	W	L	Pts	SW	SL	SR	SPW	SPL	SPR	
1	(Indonesia) Garuda VC	2	2	0	6	6	1	6.000	165	131	1.260	Quarter-finals
2	(Vietnam) VTV Bình Điền Long An	2	1	1	3	4	3	1.333	159	119	1.336	Quarter-finals
3	(Sri Lanka) Lanka Lions	2	0	2	0	0	6	0.000	76	150	0.507	Play-offs

Updated to match(es) played on unknown. Source: AVC
Rules for classification: Pool standing procedure

Date	Time		Score		Set 1	Set 2	Set 3	Set 4	Set 5	Total	Report
11 Jul	12:30	VTV Bình Điền Long An (Vietnam)	3–0	(Sri Lanka) Lanka Lions	25–8	25–10	25–11			75–29	Report
12 Jul	12:30	Lanka Lions (Sri Lanka)	0–3	(Indonesia) Garuda VC	20–25	16–25	11–25			47–75	Report
13 Jul	12:30	Garuda VC (Indonesia)	3–1	(Vietnam) VTV Bình Điền Long An	15–25	25–18	25–18	25–23		90–84	Report

== Final Round ==
=== Rankings ===
Pool A		Pool B		Pool C	
1	(Japan) NEC Red Rockets	1	(Kazakhstan) Altay	1	(Indonesia) Garuda VC
2	(Thailand) Supreme Chonburi	2	(Chinese Taipei) CMFC	2	(Vietnam) VTV Bình Điền Long An
3	(China) Jiangsu Zenith Steel	3	(Iran) Paykan Tehran VC	3	(Sri Lanka) Lanka Lions

=== Classification round (R5–9) ===
==== Section 1 ====
Play-off
16 July
(Vietnam) VTV Bình Điền Long An	3
(Sri Lanka) Lanka Lions	0

===== Section 1 =====
- Winners will advance to Fifth to Eighth Classification round.
- Losers will be ninth place.

Date	Time		Score		Set 1	Set 2	Set 3	Set 4	Set 5	Total	Report
16 Jul	13:30	VTV Bình Điền Long An (Vietnam)	3–0	(Sri Lanka) Lanka Lions	25–8	25–19	25–18			75–45	Report

==== Section 2 ====
Play-off
16 July
(Iran) Paykan Tehran VC	1
(Indonesia) Garuda VC	3

===== Section 2 =====
- Winners will advance to Fifth to Eighth Classification round.
- Losers will advance to Fifth to Eighth Classification round.

Date	Time		Score		Set 1	Set 2	Set 3	Set 4	Set 5	Total	Report
16 Jul	16:00	Paykan Tehran VC (Iran)	1–3	(Indonesia) Garuda VC	25–23	20–25	22–25	18–25		85–98	Report

==== Fifth to Eighth Classification Round ====
5th–8th places
17 July
(Chinese Taipei) CMFC	1
(Iran) Paykan Tehran VC	3
17 July
(Indonesia) Garuda VC	3
(Vietnam) VTV Bình Điền Long An	1

5th place
18 July
(Iran) Paykan Tehran VC	0
(Indonesia) Garuda VC	3
7th place
18 July
(Chinese Taipei) CMFC	0
(Vietnam) VTV Bình Điền Long An	3

===== Fifth to Eighth places =====
- Winners will advance to Fifth place play-off.
- Losers will be given a chance to Seventh place play-off.

Date	Time		Score		Set 1	Set 2	Set 3	Set 4	Set 5	Total	Report
17 Jul	10:00	Garuda VC (Indonesia)	3–1	(Vietnam) VTV Bình Điền Long An	25–19	25–23	15–25	25–20		90–87	Report
17 Jul	12:30	CMFC (Chinese Taipei)	1–3	(Iran) Paykan Tehran VC	24–26	20–25	25–22	13–25		82–98	Report

===== Seventh place =====
Date	Time		Score		Set 1	Set 2	Set 3	Set 4	Set 5	Total	Report
18 Jul	10:00	CMFC (Chinese Taipei)	0–3	(Vietnam) VTV Bình Điền Long An	19–25	22–25	16–25			57–75	Report

===== Fifth place =====
Date	Time		Score		Set 1	Set 2	Set 3	Set 4	Set 5	Total	Report
18 Jul	12:30	Paykan Tehran VC (Iran)	0–3	(Indonesia) Garuda VC	25–27	18–25	19–25			62–77	Report

=== Championship round (R1–9) ===
Play-offs
14 July
(Chinese Taipei) CMFC	3
(Sri Lanka) Lanka Lions	0

Quarter-finals
14 July
(Thailand) Supreme Chonburi	3
(Iran) Paykan Tehran VC	0
14 July
(China) Jiangsu Zenith Steel	3
(Indonesia) Garuda VC	0
16 July
(Japan) NEC Red Rockets	3
(Chinese Taipei) CMFC	1
14 July
(Kazakhstan) Altay	3
(Vietnam) VTV Bình Điền Long An	0

Semi-finals
17 July
(Thailand) Supreme Chonburi	3
(China) Jiangsu Zenith Steel	0
17 July
(Japan) NEC Red Rockets	3
(Kazakhstan) Altay	0

Final
18 July
(Thailand) Supreme Chonburi	3
(Japan) NEC Red Rockets	2
Third place
18 July
(China) Jiangsu Zenith Steel	3
(Kazakhstan) Altay	2

==== Play-offs ====
- Winners will advance to Quarter-finals.
- Losers will transfer to Classification round (R5–9).

Date	Time		Score		Set 1	Set 2	Set 3	Set 4	Set 5	Total	Report
14 Jul	17:30	CMFC (Chinese Taipei)	3–0	(Sri Lanka) Lanka Lions	25–12	25–12	25–11			75–35	Report

==== Quarter-finals ====
- Winners will advance to Semi-finals.
- Losers will transfer to Classification round (R5–9).

Date	Time		Score		Set 1	Set 2	Set 3	Set 4	Set 5	Total	Report
14 Jul	12:30	Jiangsu Zenith Steel (China)	3–0	(Indonesia) Garuda VC	25–21	25–22	25–20			75–63	Report
14 Jul	15:00	Supreme Chonburi (Thailand)	3–0	(Iran) Paykan Tehran VC	25–14	25–12	25–16			75–42	Report
14 Jul	20:00	Altay (Kazakhstan)	3–0	(Vietnam) VTV Bình Điền Long An	25–17	25–21	25–15			75–53	Report
16 Jul	19:00	NEC Red Rockets (Japan)	3–1	(Chinese Taipei) CMFC	25–15	25–18	19–25	25–15		94–73	Report

==== Semi-finals ====
- Winners will advance to Finals.
- Losers will be given a chance to Third place play-off .

Date	Time		Score		Set 1	Set 2	Set 3	Set 4	Set 5	Total	Report
17 Jul	15:00	Supreme Chonburi (Thailand)	3–0	(China) Jiangsu Zenith Steel	25–19	25–19	25–15			75–53	Report
17 Jul	18:00	NEC Red Rockets (Japan)	3–0	(Kazakhstan) Altay	25–20	25–17	28–26			78–63	Report

==== Third place ====
Date	Time		Score		Set 1	Set 2	Set 3	Set 4	Set 5	Total	Report
18 Jul	15:00	Jiangsu Zenith Steel (China)	3–2	(Kazakhstan) Altay	25–20	25–23	21–25	17–25	15–12	103–105	Report

==== Final ====
- Winners will advance to World Championship.

Date	Time		Score		Set 1	Set 2	Set 3	Set 4	Set 5	Total	Report
18 Jul	18:00	Supreme Chonburi (Thailand)	3–2	(Japan) NEC Red Rockets	13–25	25–21	25–18	20–25	16–14	99–103	Report

== Final standing ==
Rank	Team
1st place, gold medalist(s)	(Thailand) Supreme Chonburi
2nd place, silver medalist(s)	(Japan) NEC Red Rockets
3rd place, bronze medalist(s)	(China) Jiangsu Zenith Steel
4	(Kazakhstan) Altay
5	(Indonesia) Garuda VC
6	(Iran) Paykan Tehran VC
7	(Vietnam) VTV Bình Điền Long An
8	(Chinese Taipei) CMFC
9	(Sri Lanka) Lanka Lions

2018 Asian Women's Club Champions
(Thailand)
Supreme Chonburi
2nd title

Team roster
Supattra Pairoj, Piyanut Pannoy,Wipawee Srithong, Pleumjit Thinkaow, Patcharaporn Sittisad, Taylor Sandbothe,Chatchu-on Moksri, Wilavan Apinyapong (c), Nampueng Khamart, Nootsara Tomkom, Kullapa Piampongsann, Watchareeya Nuanjam, Ajcharaporn Kongyot, Fatou Diouck
Head coach
Nataphon Srisamutnak

== Medalists ==
Gold	Silver	Bronze
(Thailand) Supreme Chonburi Supattra Pairoj; Piyanut Pannoy; Wipawee Srithong; Pleumjit Thinkaow; Patcharaporn Sittisad; Chatchu-on Moksri; Wilavan Apinyapong (c); Nampueng Khamart; Nootsara Tomkom; Taylor Sandbothe; Kullapa Piampongsann; Watchareeya Nuanjam; Ajcharaporn Kongyot; Fatou Diouck	(Japan) NEC Red Rockets Kana Ōno; Kaori Ueno; Kaname Yamaguchi; Mizuki Yanakita (c); Yuna Okuyama; Sayaka Iwasaki; Sayaka Shinohara; Nanami Hirose; Misaki Yamauchi; Shiori Tsukada; Manami Kojima; Shiori Aratani; Nichika Yamada	(China) Jiangsu Zenith Steel Wu Han; Rong Wanqianbai; Wang Yuqi; Yang Wenjin; Zhou Xinyi; Zang Qianqian; Xu Ruoya (c); Wang Chenyue; Bai Jie; Chen Yixuan; Wei Yuxin

== Awards ==
- Most Valuable Player

(Thailand) Ajcharaporn Kongyot (Supreme Chonburi)

- Best Setter

(China) Rong Wanqianbai (Jiangsu Zenith Steel)

- Best Outside Spikers

(Thailand) Ajcharaporn Kongyot (Supreme Chonburi)
(Kazakhstan) Olga Kubassevich (Altay)

- Best Middle Blockers

(Russia) Natalia Sharshakova (Altay)
(China) Wang Chenyue (Jiangsu Zenith Steel)

- Best Opposite Spiker

(Japan) Nanami Hirose (NEC Red Rockets)

- Best Libero

(Japan) Sayaka Iwasaki (NEC Red Rockets)
