= Altay VC =

- Full name: Altay Volleyball Club
- Nickname: Altay
- Founded: 2004
- Chairman: (Russia) Yury Panchenko
- Head coach: (Serbia) Marko Gršić
- Captain: (Kazakhstan) Sana Anarkulova
- League: Kazakhstan National Liga
- 2017-2018: 1

Altay Volleyball Club is a Kazakh volleyball club that plays at the Kazakhstan National Liga.

Altay's predecessor, Ust-Kamenogorsk VC was formed in 2005 which merged with Semey VC in 2015 to establish the Altay Volleyball Club. The club has been successful at the Kazakhstan Volleyball Championship being crowned six times by 2016.

They participated at the 2016 Asian Men's Club Volleyball Championship where they finished fifth, and the Women's team finished fourth in three straight Asian Women's Club Volleyball Championships, 2016, 2017 and 2018.

== Honours ==
Women's
Kazakhstan Volleyball Championship
- Champions (6): 2009–2010, 2010–2011, 2011–2012, 2012–2013, 2014–2015, 2015–2016, 2016–2017, 2017–2018
- Runners-up (1): 2008–2009

Kazakhstan Spartakiad
- Runners-up (1): 2015

== Rosters ==
Roster in the 2021 FIVB Volleyball Women's Club World Championship.

Head coach: Marko Grisic

| No. | Player | Position |
|---|---|---|
| 1 | Perizat Nurbergenova | OH |
| 2 | Sana Anarkulova | OH |
| 3 | Zinat Kadyrbekova | O |
| 5 | Botagoz Yessimkhan | S |
| 6 | Saniya Balagazinova | MB |
| 7 | Zarina Sitkazinova | L |
| 8 | Polina Ufimtseva | MB |
| 9 | Lyudmila Issayeva | MB |
| 10 | Irina Kenzhebaeva | OH |
| 11 | Yelizaveta Meister | S |
| 12 | Zhannel Nogaibayeva | L |
| 13 | Kristina Belova | OH |
| 14 | Danica Radenkovic | S |
| 15 | Madina Beket | L |
| 16 | Nadiia Kodola | OH |
| 17 | Bethania de la Cruz | OH |
| 18 | Kristina Anikonova | MB |

=== 2018 Asian Club Championship ===
Head coach: (Russia) Iurii Panchenko

| No. | Name | Date of birth | Height | Weight | Spike | Block |
|---|---|---|---|---|---|---|
| 1 | (Brazil) Heloiza Pereira | 2 November 1990 | 1.88 m (6 ft 2 in) | 77 kg (170 lb) | 310 cm (120 in) | 304 cm (120 in) |
| 2 | (Kazakhstan) Sana Anarkulova (C) | 21 July 1989 | 1.88 m (6 ft 2 in) | 72 kg (159 lb) | 300 cm (120 in) | 295 cm (116 in) |
| 3 | (Kazakhstan) Natalya Akilova | 31 May 1993 | 1.83 m (6 ft 0 in) | 62 kg (137 lb) | 295 cm (116 in) | 275 cm (108 in) |
| 4 | (Kazakhstan) Aliya Sadykova | 1 August 1988 | 1.72 m (5 ft 8 in) | 60 kg (130 lb) | 270 cm (110 in) | 260 cm (100 in) |
| 7 | (Kazakhstan) Tatyana Fendrikova | 23 February 1990 | 1.69 m (5 ft 7 in) | 55 kg (121 lb) | 280 cm (110 in) | 275 cm (108 in) |
| 8 | (Kazakhstan) Korinna Ishimtseva | 8 February 1984 | 1.84 m (6 ft 0 in) | 70 kg (150 lb) | 300 cm (120 in) | 290 cm (110 in) |
| 9 | (Russia) Natalia Sharshakova | 28 March 1990 | 1.87 m (6 ft 2 in) | 75 kg (165 lb) | 300 cm (120 in) | 310 cm (120 in) |
| 11 | (Kazakhstan) Botagoz Sarsenbayeva | 16 May 1997 | 1.75 m (5 ft 9 in) | 60 kg (130 lb) | 270 cm (110 in) | 260 cm (100 in) |
| 12 | (Kazakhstan) Ainagul Aizharikhova | 4 September 1994 | 1.85 m (6 ft 1 in) | 65 kg (143 lb) | 290 cm (110 in) | 280 cm (110 in) |
| 14 | (Kazakhstan) Alla Bogdashkina | 22 August 1985 | 1.85 m (6 ft 1 in) | 65 kg (143 lb) | 275 cm (108 in) | 270 cm (110 in) |
| 16 | (Russia) Lyudmila Khabibulina | 18 May 1988 | 1.90 m (6 ft 3 in) | 75 kg (165 lb) | 310 cm (120 in) | 305 cm (120 in) |
| 17 | (Kazakhstan) Olga Kubassevich | 10 June 1980 | 1.83 m (6 ft 0 in) | 75 kg (165 lb) | 300 cm (120 in) | 295 cm (116 in) |
| 18 | (Kazakhstan) Kristina Anikonova | 5 January 1991 | 1.84 m (6 ft 0 in) | 72 kg (159 lb) | 290 cm (110 in) | 280 cm (110 in) |
| 19 | (Cuba) Yunieska Batista | 21 March 1993 | 1.85 m (6 ft 1 in) | 70 kg (150 lb) | 315 cm (124 in) | 300 cm (120 in) |

== Team roster 2017—2018 ==
| No. | Name | Date of birth | Height | Weight | Spike | Block |
|---|---|---|---|---|---|---|
| 1 | (Kazakhstan) Olga Karpova | 10 June 1980 | 1.83 m (6 ft 0 in) | 75 kg (165 lb) | 300 cm (120 in) | 295 cm (116 in) |
| 2 | (Kazakhstan) Sana Anarkulova | 21 July 1989 | 1.88 m (6 ft 2 in) | 72 kg (159 lb) | 300 cm (120 in) | 295 cm (116 in) |
| 4 | (Kazakhstan) Aliya Sadykova | 1 August 1988 | 1.72 m (5 ft 8 in) | 60 kg (130 lb) | 270 cm (110 in) | 260 cm (100 in) |
| 5 | (Thailand) Piyanut Pannoy | 10 November 1989 | 1.71 m (5 ft 7 in) | 62 kg (137 lb) | 270 cm (110 in) | 260 cm (100 in) |
| 6 | (Puerto Rico) Raymariely Santos | 13 April 1992 | 1.83 m (6 ft 0 in) | 72 kg (159 lb) | 290 cm (110 in) | 288 cm (113 in) |
| 7 | (Kazakhstan) Inna German | 17 January 1983 | 1.83 m (6 ft 0 in) | 75 kg (165 lb) | 290 cm (110 in) | 280 cm (110 in) |
| 8 | (Kazakhstan) Korinna Ishimtseva | 8 February 1984 | 1.84 m (6 ft 0 in) | 70 kg (150 lb) | 300 cm (120 in) | 290 cm (110 in) |
| 9 | (Kazakhstan) Irina Lukomskaya | 19 March 1991 | 1.76 m (5 ft 9 in) | 67 kg (148 lb) | 275 cm (108 in) | 265 cm (104 in) |
| 10 | (Kazakhstan) Yelena Ezau | 9 March 1983 | 1.73 m (5 ft 8 in) | 57 kg (126 lb) | 275 cm (108 in) | 265 cm (104 in) |
| 11 | (Ukraine) Viktoriya Lokhmanchuk | 1 January 2001 | 1.90 m (6 ft 3 in) | 70 kg (150 lb) | 303 cm (119 in) | 295 cm (116 in) |
| 12 | (Kazakhstan) Ainagul Aizharikhova | 4 September 1994 | 1.85 m (6 ft 1 in) | 65 kg (143 lb) | 290 cm (110 in) | 280 cm (110 in) |
| 13 | (Serbia) Bojana Radulović | 31 March 1992 | 1.75 m (5 ft 9 in) | 62 kg (137 lb) | 309 cm (122 in) | 295 cm (116 in) |
| 14 | (Serbia) Jovana Brakočević | 5 March 1988 | 1.96 m (6 ft 5 in) | 82 kg (181 lb) | 309 cm (122 in) | 295 cm (116 in) |
| 15 | (Kazakhstan) Evgenia Ilina | 14 August 1991 | 1.87 m (6 ft 2 in) | 83 kg (183 lb) | 295 cm (116 in) | 285 cm (112 in) |
| 16 | (Kazakhstan) Inna Matveyeva (C) | 12 October 1978 | 1.88 m (6 ft 2 in) | 70 kg (150 lb) | 295 cm (116 in) | 285 cm (112 in) |
| 18 | (Kazakhstan) Kristina Anikonova | 5 January 1991 | 1.84 m (6 ft 0 in) | 72 kg (159 lb) | 290 cm (110 in) | 280 cm (110 in) |
| 18 | (Russia) Daria Ostrovskaïa | 19 October 1994 | 1.83 m (6 ft 0 in) | 65 kg (143 lb) | 295 cm (116 in) | 290 cm (110 in) |
| 19 | (Cuba) Yunieska Batista | 21 March 1993 | 1.85 m (6 ft 1 in) | 70 kg (150 lb) | 315 cm (124 in) | 300 cm (120 in) |
| 24 | (Kazakhstan) Alessya Safronova | 10 February 1986 | 1.89 m (6 ft 2 in) | 66 kg (146 lb) | 295 cm (116 in) | 285 cm (112 in) |

== Notable players ==
Domestic players

Kazakhstan

- Alessya Safronova
- Inna Matveyeva
- Evgenia Ilina
- Yelena Ezau
- Irina Lukomskaya

Foreign players

Puerto Rico

- Raymariely Santos

Thailand

- Piyanut Pannoy

Ukraine

- Viktoriya Lokhmanchuk

Serbia

- Bojana Radulović
- Jovana Brakočević
- Bojana Milenković

Russia

- Daria Ostrovskaïa
