= Yelena Ezau =

Kazakhstani volleyball player

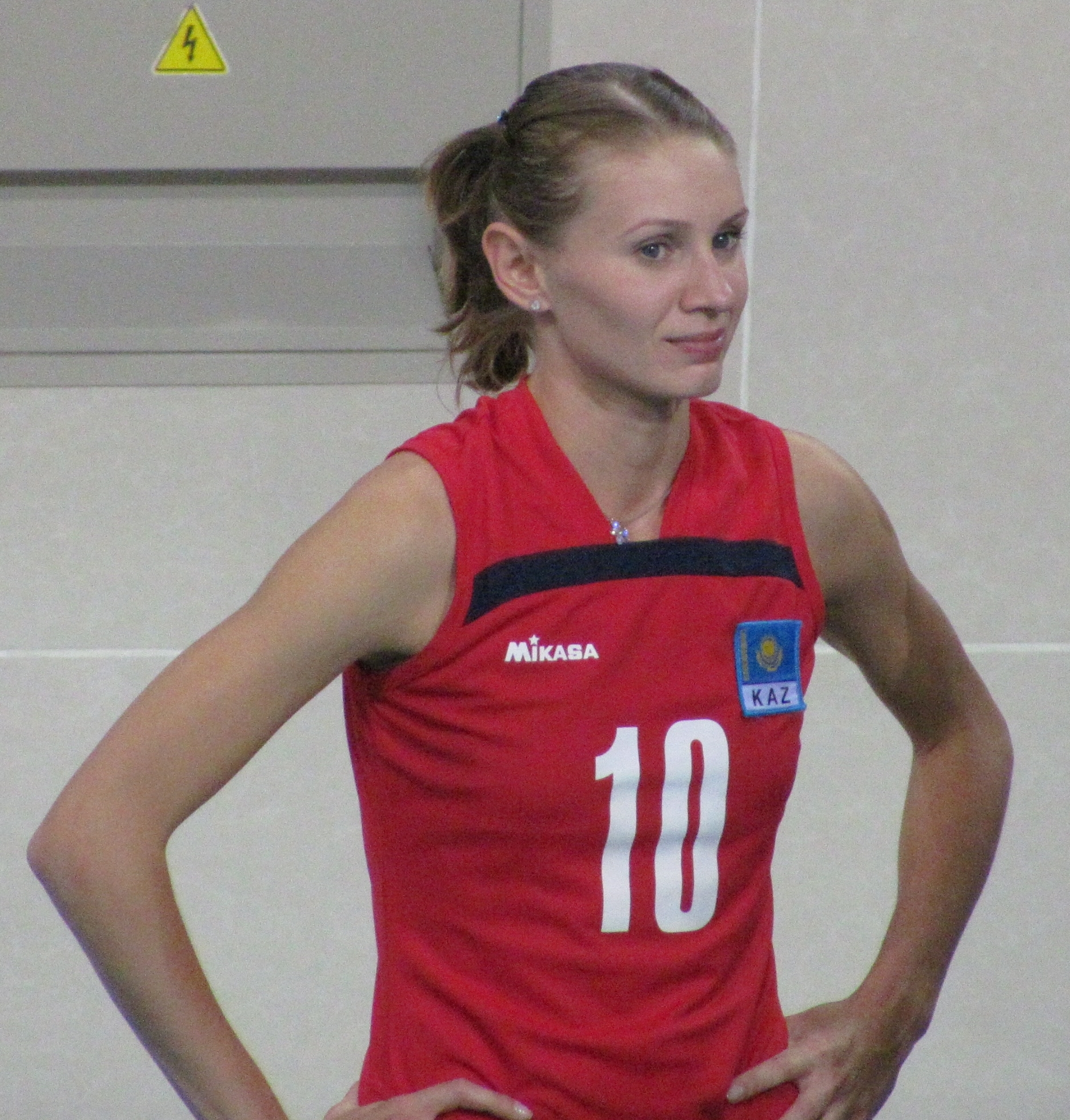
- Yelena Ezau pictured at the 2011 FIVB Volleyball World Grand Prix which was held during August.

Personal information
- Nickname: Jelena Ezau
- Nationality: Kazakhstan
- Born: 9 March 1983 (age 43) Pavlodar, Kazakh SSR, Soviet Union
- Home town: Pavlodar
- Height: 1.74 m (5 ft 9 in)
- Weight: 57 kg (126 lb)
- Spike: 275 cm (108 in)
- Block: 265 cm (104 in)

Volleyball information
- Position: Liberto
- Current club: Altay VC
- Number: 10

Career
- Years: Team
- 2008: (Kazakhstan) Rahat

National team
- Years: Team
- 2006-present: Kazakhstan
Honours
Representing Kazakhstan
Asian Games
| Bronze medal – third place | 2010 Guangzhou | team |
- Updated on 6 August 2018

Yelena Ezau (Елена Викторовна Эзау, born 9 March 1983) is a Kazakhstani female volleyball player who currently plays for the Kazakhstani domestic club Altay VC in domestic league matches.

She has represented Kazakhstan national team in several international competitive events including the FIVB Volleyball Women's World Championship, in the Asian Games and in the solitary Olympic event in 2008.

== Career ==
Yelena Ezau made it into the national side for the 2006 Asian Games after making her international debut in the same year. Four years later, she was part of the Kazakhstan team which secured bronze medal in the women's team event at the 2010 Asian Games. She also participated at the 2008 Summer Olympics, which is also her only Olympic event in her playing career.

Yelena has competed at the FIVB Volleyball Women's World Championship twice in 2006 and 2010. She also competed for the national side at the 2007 FIVB Volleyball World Grand Prix and at the 2008 FIVB Volleyball World Grand Prix.

She was also the member of the Kazakhstani domestic volleyball club Altay VC during the 2016 Asian Women's Club Volleyball Championship which eventually finished on fourth position after losing the bronze medal match to the Thai VC Bangkok Glass.
