= Ajcharaporn Kongyot =

Thai volleyball player (born 1995)

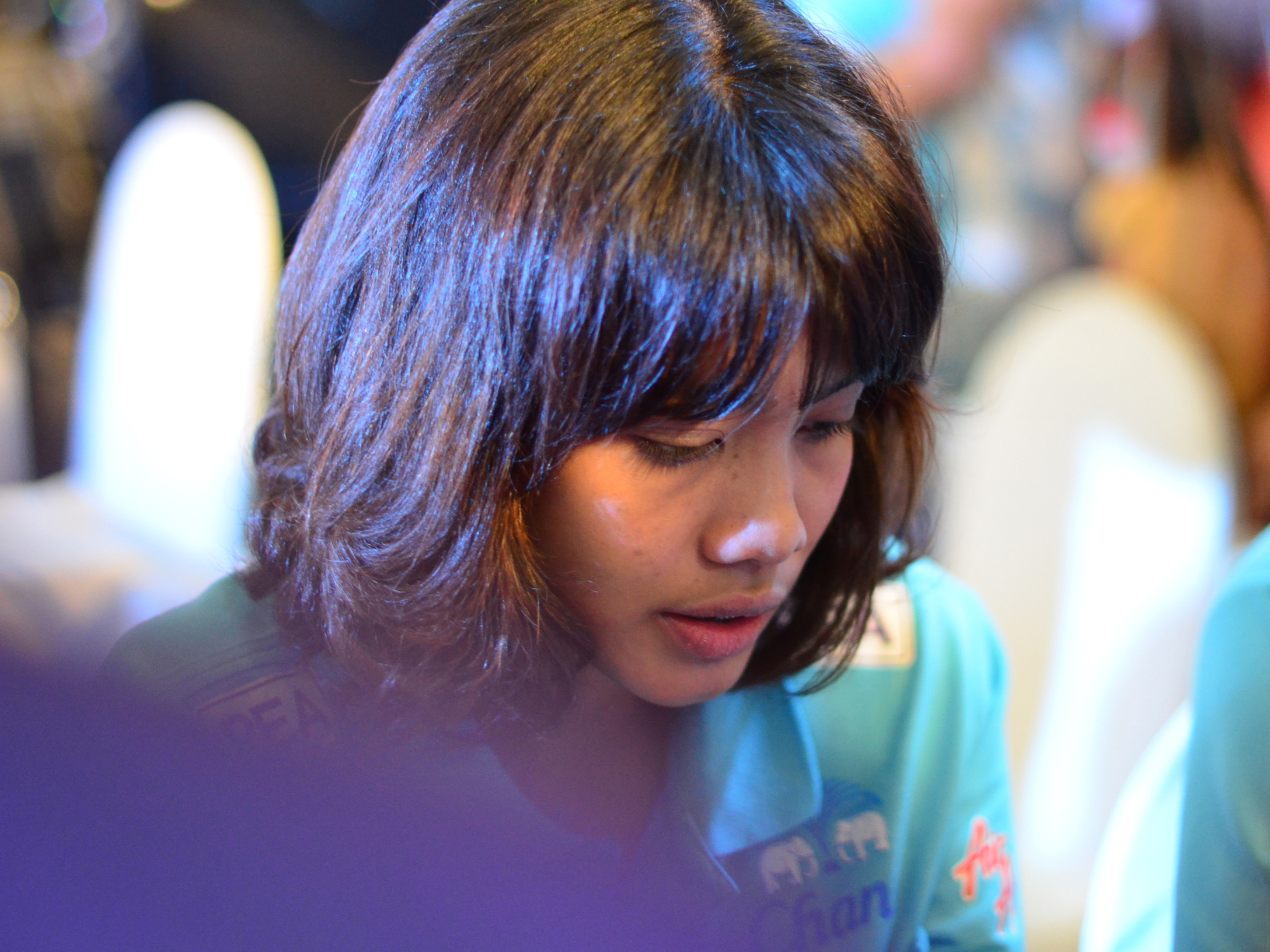

Personal information
- Full name: Ajcharaporn Kongyot
- Nickname: Pure
- Nationality: Thai
- Born: June 18, 1995 (age 31); Nakhon Si Thammarat, Thailand
- Height: 1.83 m (6 ft 0 in)
- Weight: 66 kg (146 lb)
- Spike: 308 cm (121 in)
- Block: 295 cm (116 in)

Volleyball information
- Position: Outside Hitter
- Current club: (United States) Dallas Pulse
- Number: 18

National team
2010–	Thailand
Honours
Women's volleyball
Representing Thailand
Montreux Volley Masters
Silver medal – second place	2016 Switzerland	Team
Asian Games
Silver medal – second place	2018 Jakarta-Palembang	Team
Bronze medal – third place	2022 Hangzhou	Team
Bronze medal – third place	2026 Aichi/Nagoya	Team
Asian Championship
Gold medal – first place	2013 Nakhon Ratchasima	Team
Gold medal – first place	2023 Nakhon Ratchasima	Team
Gold medal – first place	2026 Tianjin	Team
Silver medal – second place	2017 Biñan	Team
Silver medal – second place	2019 Seoul	Team
Bronze medal – third place	2015 Tianjin	Team
Asian Cup
Gold medal – first place	2012 Almaty	Team
Bronze medal – third place	2016 Vĩnh Phúc	Team
Bronze medal – third place	2018 Nakhon Ratchasima	Team
Bronze medal – third place	2022 Pasig	Team
Southeast Asian Games
Gold medal – first place	2013 Naypyidaw	Team
Gold medal – first place	2015 Singapore	Team
Gold medal – first place	2017 Kuala Lumpur	Team
Gold medal – first place	2019 Philippines	Team
Gold medal – first place	2021 Vietnam	Team
Gold medal – first place	2023 Cambodia	Team
Gold medal – first place	2025 Thailand	Team

Ajcharaporn Kongyot (Thai: อัจฉราพร คงยศ; RTGS: Atcharaphon Khongyot; born June 18, 1995) is a Thai indoor volleyball player. She is a current member of the Thailand women's national volleyball team.

== Career ==
She is on the list 2019 Korea-Thailand all star super match competition.

In 2026, she joined Dallas Pulse team.

== Clubs ==
- (Indonesia) Bank DKI (2013)
- (Thailand) Supreme Chonburi-E.tech (2009–2021)
- (Indonesia) Jakarta BNI 46 (2018–2019)
- (Turkey) Sarıyer Belediyesi (2021–2023)
- (Japan) NEC Red Rockets (2023–2025)
- (Japan) Aranmare Yamagata (2025–2026)
- (United States) Dallas Pulse (2026–2027)

== Awards ==
=== Individuals ===
- 2012–13 Thailand League – "Best Server"
- 2013–14 Thailand League – "Best Outside Spiker"
- 2014 VTV International Cup – "Best Best Spiker"
- 2014–15 Thailand League – "Best Outside Spiker"
- 2015 VTV Cup Championship – "Best Outside Spiker"
- 2016 Montreux Volley Masters – "Best Outside Spiker"
- 2016 Asian Cup – "Best Outside Spiker"
- 2016–17 Thailand League – "Best Outside Spiker"
- 2016–17 Thailand League – "Most Valuable Player"
- 2018 Thai–Denmark Super League – "Most Valuable Player"
- 2018 Asian Club Championship – "Best Outside Spiker"
- 2018 Asian Club Championship – "Most Valuable Player"
- 2018 Asian Cup – "Best Outside Spiker"
- 2019 Asian Club Championship – "Best Opposite Spiker"
- 2019-20 Thailand League - "Most Valuable Player"
- 2022 ASEAN Grand Prix - "Best Outside Spiker"
- 2025 SEA V.League - "Best Outside Spiker"

=== Clubs ===
- 2017 Thai–Denmark Super League – Champion, with Supreme Chonburi
- 2018 Thai-Denmark Super League – Champion, with Supreme Chonburi
- 2019 Thai–Denmark Super League – Champion, with Supreme Chonburi
- 2016–17 Thailand League – Champion, with Supreme Chonburi
- 2017–18 Thailand League – Champion, with Supreme Chonburi
- 2017 Asian Club Championship – Champion, with Supreme Chonburi
- 2018 Asian Club Championship – Champion, with Supreme Chonburi
- 2019 Asian Club Championship – Runner-up, with Supreme Chonburi
- 2019-20 Thailand League – Champion, with Supreme Chonburi

== Royal decorations ==
- 2013 – Commander (Third Class) of The Most Exalted Order of the White Elephant
- 2015 – Gold Medalist (Sixth Class) of The Most Admirable Order of the Direkgunabhorn
- 2023 – Commander (Third Class) of The Most Admirable Order of the Direkgunabhorn

Awards
Preceded by (Japan) Yuki Ishii and (Netherlands) Anne Buijs	Best Outside Spiker of Montreux Volley Masters; 2016 (with (China) Hui Ruoqi)	Succeeded by (Brazil) Natália Pereira and (Argentina) Yamila Nizetich
Preceded by (China) Zhang Changning and (China) Liu Yanhan	Best Outside Spiker of Asian Cup; 2016 (with (China) Li Jing); 2018 (with (Japan) Miwako Osanai)	Succeeded by TBA
Preceded by (Thailand) Chatchu-on Moksri and (Kazakhstan) Inna Matveyeva	Best Outside Spiker of AVC Club Volleyball Championship; 2018 (with (Kazakhstan) Olga Kubassevich)	Succeeded by TBA
