= Inna German =

Kazakhstani volleyball player

Personal information
- Nationality: Kazakhstan
- Born: 17 January 1983 (age 43) Karaganda, Kazakhstan
- Height: 1.82 m (6 ft 0 in)
- Weight: 75 kg (165 lb)
- Spike: 300 cm (120 in)
- Block: 280 cm (110 in)

Volleyball information
- Position: Middle blocker
- Number: 12

National team
- Years: Team
- 2014-: Kazakhstan

Inna German (born 17 January 1983) is a Kazakhstani female volleyball player.

She is a member of the Kazakhstan women's national volleyball team. She was part of the Kazakhstani national team at the 2014 FIVB Volleyball Women's World Championship in Italy. and at the 2016 Summer Olympics qualification.

On the club level, she played for Altay VC at the 2017 Asian Women's Club Volleyball Championship.

== Clubs ==
- 2014 (Kazakhstan) Karaganda
- 2017—2018 (Kazakhstan) Altay VC.
