= Yunieska Batista =

Cuban volleyball player (born 1993)

Personal information
- Nationality: Cuban
- Born: 21 March 1993 (age 33)
- Height: 1.85 m (6 ft 1 in)
- Weight: 70 kg (154 lb)
- Spike: 315 cm (124 in)
- Block: 300 cm (118 in)

Volleyball information

Career
- Years: Team
- 2010: Isla de la Juventud
- 2025: Chery Tiggo EV Crossovers

National team
- Years: Team
- 2010: Cuba

Yunieska Robles Batista (born 21 March 1993) is a Cuban female volleyball player who last played for the Chery Tiggo Crossovers of the Premier Volleyball League in the Philippines. She was part of the Cuba women's national volleyball team.

She participated in the 2010 FIVB Volleyball Women's World Championship, and the 2012 FIVB Volleyball World Grand Prix. She played with Isla de la Juventud.

== Clubs ==
- (Cuba) Isla de la Juventud (2010)
- (Philippines) Chery Tiggo EV Crossovers (2025)
