= Zarina Sitkazinova =

Kazakhstani volleyball player (born 1991)

Personal information
- Nationality: Kazakhstan
- Born: 20 March 1993 (age 33)
- Home town: Uralsk, West Kazakhstan, Kazakhstan
- Height: 1.82 m (6 ft 0 in)
- Weight: 70 kg (150 lb)
- Spike: 295 cm (116 in)
- Block: 280 cm (110 in)

Volleyball information
- Position: Wing-spiker
- Number: 14

Career
- Years: Team
- 2011: (Kazakhstan) Zhetysu Almaty

National team
- Years: Team
- 2010-2016: Kazakhstan

Zarina Sitkazinova (born 20 March 1993) is a Kazakhstani female volleyball player. She is a member of the Kazakhstan women's national volleyball team and played for Zhetysu Almaty in 2011.

She was part of the Kazakhstani national team at the 2010 FIVB Volleyball Women's World Championship in Japan, 2011 FIVB World Grand Prix in Italy, 2013 FIVB World Grand Prix and 2016 FIVB World Grand Prix.

== Clubs ==
- (Kazakhstan) Zhetysu Almaty (2010)
