= Ainagul Aizharikhova =

Kazakhstani volleyball player (born 1994)

Personal information
- Nationality: Kazakhstani
- Born: 4 September 1994 (age 32)
- Height: 186 cm (73 in)
- Weight: 65 kg (143 lb)
- Spike: 320 cm (126 in)
- Block: 305 cm (120 in)

Volleyball information
- Number: 21 (national team)

Career
Years	Teams
2015	Astana

National team
2015	Kazakhstan

Ainagul Aizharikhova (born 4 September 1994) is a Kazakhstani volleyball player. She is part of the Kazakhstan women's national volleyball team.

She competed at the 2015 FIVB Volleyball World Grand Prix. On club level she played for Astana in 2015.
