= Danica Radenković =

Serbian volleyball player

Danica Radenkovic
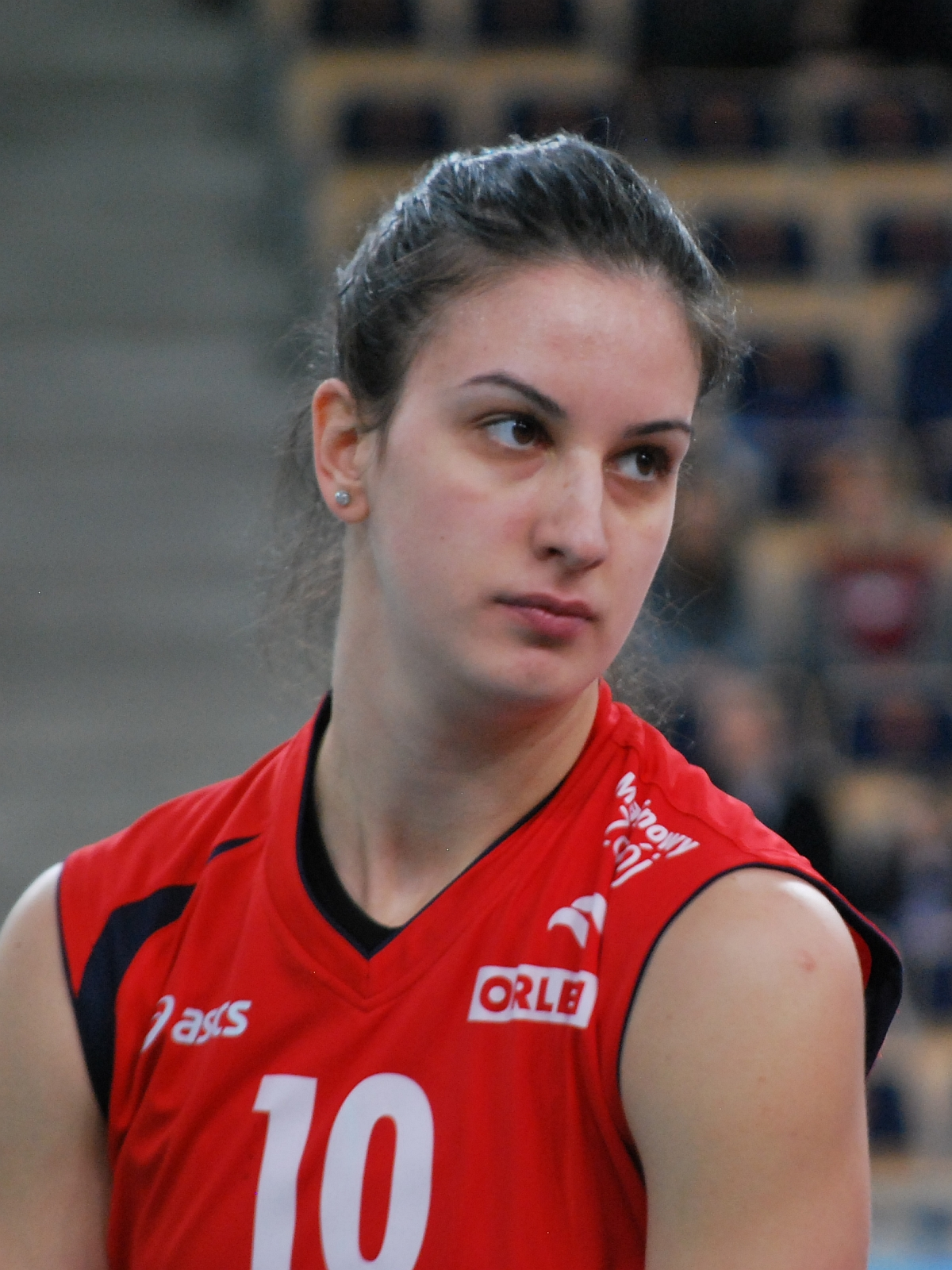

Personal information
- Nationality: Serbian
- Born: 9 October 1992 (age 34); Niš, SR Serbia
- Hometown: Nis, Serbia
- Height: 1.85 m (6 ft 1 in)
- Weight: 70 kg (154 lb)
- Spike: 305 cm (120 in)
- Block: 295 cm (116 in)

Volleyball information
- Position: Setter
- Number: 10

Career
Years	Teams
2007-2009; 2009-2010; 2010-2012; 2012-2013; 2013-2014; 2014-2015; 2015-2016; 2016-2017; 2017-2018; 2018-	Tent; Klek Srbijasume; Spartak Subotica; River; Schweriner; Muszyna; Atom Trefl Sopot; Azerrail Baku; Muszyna; Casalmaggiore

Danica Radenković (born 9 October 1992 in Niš) is a Serbia women's national volleyball team player. She is setter for Casalmaggiore.

== Career ==
Danica Radenković's professional career began in the 2007-08 season, when she made her debut in the Serbian Superliga with the TENT of Obrenovac, where she played for two years; in 2009 with the Under-18 selection he won the silver medal at the European championship and the world championship, a tournament in which he was also awarded as the best dribbler.

In the 2009-10 championship she played for Klek Srbijašume, while in the following championship she landed for two years at Spartak Subotica; after having been part of the Serbian Under-19 selection in 2010, winning silver at the European championship, in which she receives the prize of best dribbler.

In the 2012-13 season she was hired for the first time abroad, playing for the River of Piacenza, a club involved in the Italian A1 Series with which she won both the Scudetto and the Italian Cup; since 2012 she has also received the first call-ups in the senior national team. In the following season she played instead in the 1. German Bundesliga with Schweriner.

In the 2014-15 championship she arrived in Poland, where she took part in the Liga Siatkówki Kobiet with Muszyna, and then passed to the Atom Trefl Sopot in the following championship . In the 2016-17 season she moved to Azerbaijan, defending the 'Color Azerraill of Baku, while in the next year she returned to Muszyna . Shee then returned to the top Italian championship in the 2018-19 season, when she was hired by Casalmaggiore .

== Awards ==
- Italian Championship : 1

2012-13

- Italian Cup : 1

2012-13

=== National ===
- 2009 European Under-18 Championship
- 2009 Under-18 World Championship
- 2010 European Under-19 Championship

=== Individual awards ===
- 2009 - Under-18 World Championship : Best setter
- 2010 - European Under-19 Championship : Best setter
- 2017 - Supe liga : Best setter

== Sources ==
- Giocatrice – Lega Pallavolo Serie A Femminile
- Danica Radenkovic - Sezon 2017/2018 - Zawodniczki - Liga Siatkówki Kobiet
- CEV - Confédération Européenne de Volleyball
- Image at FIVB.org
