= Tatyana Fendrikova =

Kazakhstani volleyball player

Personal information
- Full name: Fendrikova (Afanasyeva) Tatyana Leonidovna
- Nationality: Kazakhstan
- Born: 23 February 1990 (age 36); Talgar, Almaty, Kazakhstan
- Height: 1.69 m (5 ft 7 in)
- Weight: 58 kg (128 lb)
- Spike: 280 cm (110 in)
- Block: 275 cm (108 in)

Volleyball information
- Position: Libero
- Number: 1

Career
Years
2008 - 2010
2010 - 2018
2018 - 2020
Teams
CSKA club
Almaty club
Altay club

National team
2011 - 2020	Kazakhstan

Tatyana Fendrikova (born 23 February 1990) is a volleyball player from Kazakhstan.

She is a member of the Kazakhstan women's national volleyball team and played for Zhetysu Almaty in 2014. She was part of the Kazakhstani national team at the 2014 FIVB Volleyball Women's World Championship in Italy.

== Clubs ==
- (Kazakhstan) CSKA, ALMATY, ALTAY
