= Supattra Pairoj =

Thai volleyball player (born 1990)

Personal information
- Nickname: A
- Nationality: Thai
- Born: June 27, 1990 (age 36); Kamphaeng Phet, Thailand
- Height: 1.60 m (5 ft 3 in)
- Weight: 53 kg (117 lb)
- Spike: 275 cm (108 in)
- Block: 265 cm (104 in)

Volleyball information
- Position: Libero
- Current club: Supreme Chonburi
- Number: 20 (National Team), 1 (Club)

National team
2017–	Thailand
Honours
Women's volleyball
Representing Thailand
Asian Games
Silver medal – second place	2018 Jakarta/Palembang	Team
Asian Championship
Gold medal – first place	2023 Nakhon Ratchasima
Silver medal – second place	2017 Biñan
Asian Cup
Bronze medal – third place	2018 Nakhon Ratchasima
Southeast Asian Games
Gold medal – first place	2017 Kuala Lumpur	Team

Supattra Pairoj (Thai: สุพัตรา ไพโรจน์; born 27 June 1990) is a Thai indoor volleyball player. She is a current member of the Thailand women's national volleyball team.

== Clubs ==
- (Thailand) Supreme Chonburi (2010–present)

== Awards ==
=== Individuals ===
- 2016–17 Thailand League – "Best Libero"
- 2017–18 Thailand League – "Best Libero"

=== Clubs ===
- 2011–12 Thailand League – Runner-up, with Supreme Nakhon Si
- 2015–16 Thailand League – Runner-up, with Supreme Nakhonsi
- 2016–17 Thailand League – Champion, with Supreme Chonburi
- 2017 Thai–Denmark Super League - Champion, with Supreme Chonburi
- 2017–18 Thailand League – Champion, with Supreme Chonburi
- 2018 Thai–Denmark Super League – Champion, with Supreme Chonburi
- 2018–19 Thailand League – Runner-up, with Supreme Chonburi
- 2019 Thai–Denmark Super League – Champion, with Supreme Chonburi
- 2017 Asian Club Championship – Champion, with Supreme Chonburi
- 2018 Asian Club Championship – Champion, with Supreme Chonburi
- 2019 Asian Club Championship – Runner-up, with Supreme Chonburi
- 2020 Thailand League – Champion, with Supreme Chonburi

== Royal decoration ==
- 2023 – Member (Fifth Class) of The Most Admirable Order of the Direkgunabhorn
