= Patcharaporn Sittisad =

Thai volleyball player

Personal information
- Nickname: Mei
- Nationality: Thailand
- Born: February 20, 1996 (age 30); Kalasin, Thailand
- Height: 1.67 m (5 ft 6 in)
- Weight: 52 kg (115 lb)

Volleyball information
- Position: Wing-spiker
- Current club: Supreme Chonburi
- Number: 7

Career
Years	Teams
2012–present	Supreme Chonburi

National team
2012–2013	U18 Thailand
2014	U20 Thailand
2014–	U23 Thailand

Patcharaporn Sittisad (Thai: พัชราภรณ์ สิทธิศาสตร์, born February 20, 1996, in Kalasin) is a Thai indoor volleyball player. She is a current member of the Thailand women's national volleyball team.

== Awards ==
=== Club ===
- 2016–17 Thailand League - Champion, with Supreme Chonburi
- 2017 Thai–Denmark Super League - Champion, with Supreme Chonburi
- 2017 Asian Club Championship - Champion, with Supreme Chonburi
- 2017–18 Thailand League - Champion, with Supreme Chonburi
- 2018 Thai–Denmark Super League - Champion, with Supreme Chonburi
- 2018–19 Thailand League - Runner-Up, with Supreme Chonburi
- 2019 Thai–Denmark Super League - Champion, with Supreme Chonburi

== National team ==
=== U23 team ===
- 2017 Asian Championship - Silver Medal
