= Nataphon Srisamutnak =

Thai volleyball coach

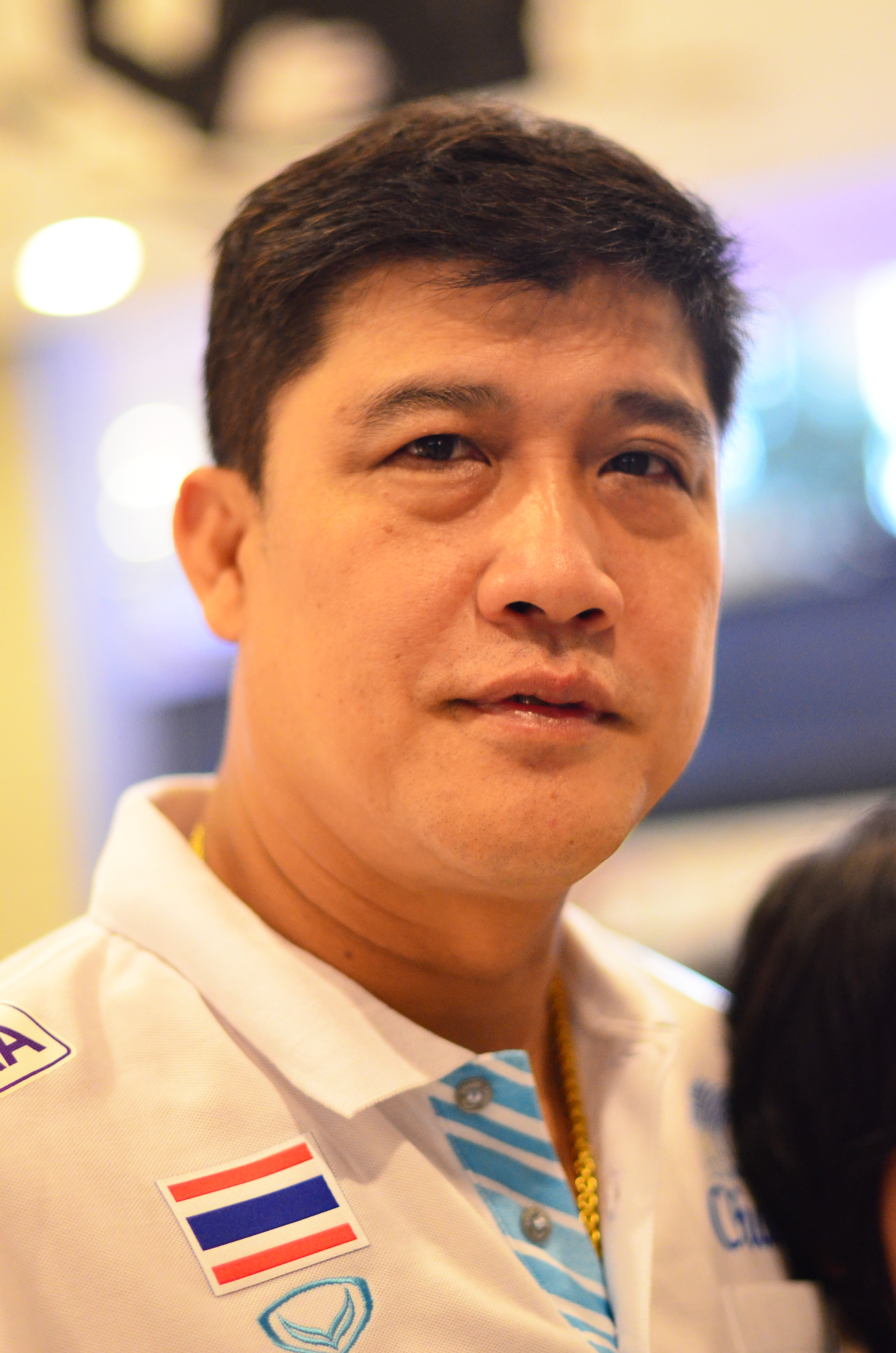

Personal information
- Full name: Nawa Akat Tho Nataphon Srisamutnak
- Nickname: Ya
- Nationality: Thailand
- Born: 23 October; Thailand

Volleyball information
- Position: Setter

National team
Thailand
Honours
Southeast Asian Games
Gold medal – first place	1985 Bangkok	Team

Nataphon Srisamutnak (Thai: ณัฐพนธ์ ศรีสมุทรนาค; born 23 October) is a Thai volleyball coach. He was the coach of the Thailand women's national volleyball team that competed at the 2014 Asian Games.

== Royal decoration ==
- 2013 - Commander (Third Class) of The Most Exalted Order of the White Elephant
