= Natalya Akilova =

Kazakhstani volleyball player (born 1993)

Personal information
- Nationality: Kazakhstan
- Born: 31 May 1993 (age 33)
- Hometown: Temirtau, Karaganda, Kazakhstan
- Height: 1.83 m (6 ft 0 in)
- Weight: 62 kg (137 lb)
- Spike: 295 cm (116 in)
- Block: 275 cm (108 in)

Volleyball information
- Position: Setter
- Number: 1

Career
Years	Teams
2011	(Kazakhstan) Zhetyssu

National team
2011-2018	Kazakhstan

Natalya Akilova (born 31 May 1993) is a Kazakhstani volleyball player. She is a member of the Kazakhstan women's national volleyball team and played for Zhetyssu in 2011. She was part of the Kazakhstani national team at the 2011 FIVB World Grand Prix in Italy. 2014 FIVB World Grand Prix, 2017 FIVB World Grand Prix, and 2018 Asian Games.

== Clubs ==
- (Kazakhstan) Zhetyssu (2011)
