= Sana Anarkulova =

Kazakhstani volleyball player (born 1989)

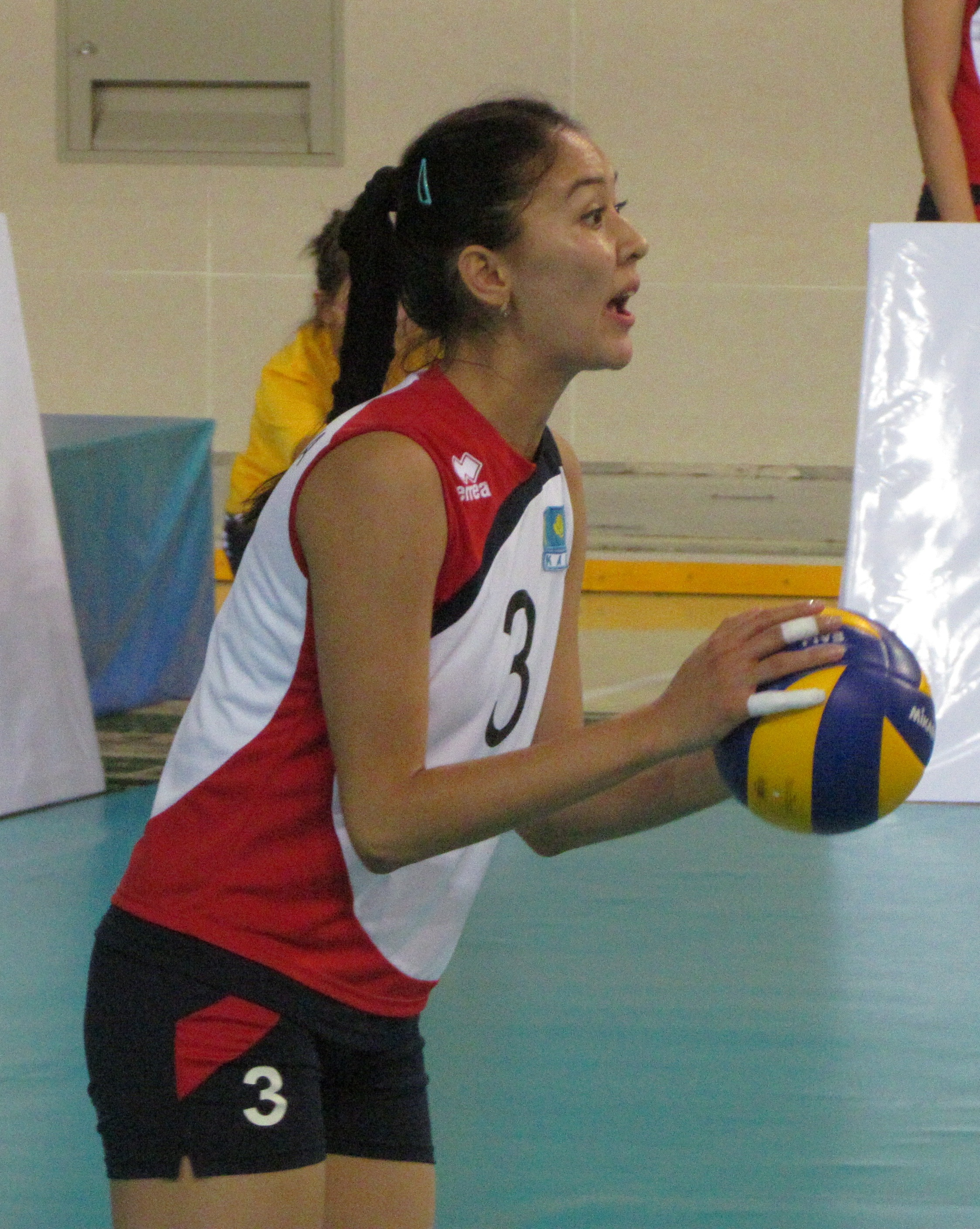
- Anarkulova in 2012

Personal information
- Nationality: Kazakhstan
- Born: 21 July 1989 (age 37)
- Height: 1.88 m (6 ft 2 in)
- Weight: 77 kg (170 lb)
- Spike: 300 cm (118 in)
- Block: 280 cm (110 in)

Volleyball information
- Position: Outside hitter
- Number: 2

Career
- Years: Team
- 2010 2014 2015–2023 2023 2023–2024 2024–present: (Kazakhstan) Almaty (Kazakhstan) Zhetysu Almaty (Kazakhstan) Altay VC (Vietnam) Thanh Hóa VC (loan) (Kazakhstan) Turan Turkistan (Serbia) ŽOK Ub

National team
- Years: Team
- 2008–present: Kazakhstan
Honours
Women's volleyball
Representing Kazakhstan
Asian Games
Bronze medal – third place	2010 Guangzhou	Team
Asian Cup
Bronze medal – third place	2012 Almaty	Team
Bronze medal – third place	2014 Shenzhen	Team
Asian Challenge Cup
Silver medal – second place	2024 Manila	Team

Sana Maksutovna Anarkulova (née Jarlagassova, Russian: Сана Максутовна Анаркулова, born 21 July 1989) is a Kazakhstani volleyball player. She is a member of the Kazakhstan women's national volleyball team and played for Zhetysu Almaty in 2014. She was part of the Kazakhstani national team at the 2010 FIVB Volleyball Women's World Championship in Japan. and at the 2014 FIVB Volleyball Women's World Championship in Italy.

During the 2018 Asian Games Sana Anarkulova scored 15 markers against the Philippines, beating them 25–11, 22–25, 25–15, 19–25, 16–14.

== Clubs ==
- (Kazakhstan) Almaty (2010)
- (Kazakhstan) Zhetysu Almaty (2014)
- (Kazakhstan) Altay VC (2015–2023)
- (Vietnam) Thanh Hóa VC (2023) (loan)
- (Kazakhstan) Turan Turkistan (2023–2024)
- (Serbia) ŽOK Ub (2024–present)
