= Olga Kubassevich =

Kazakhstani volleyball player (born 1985)

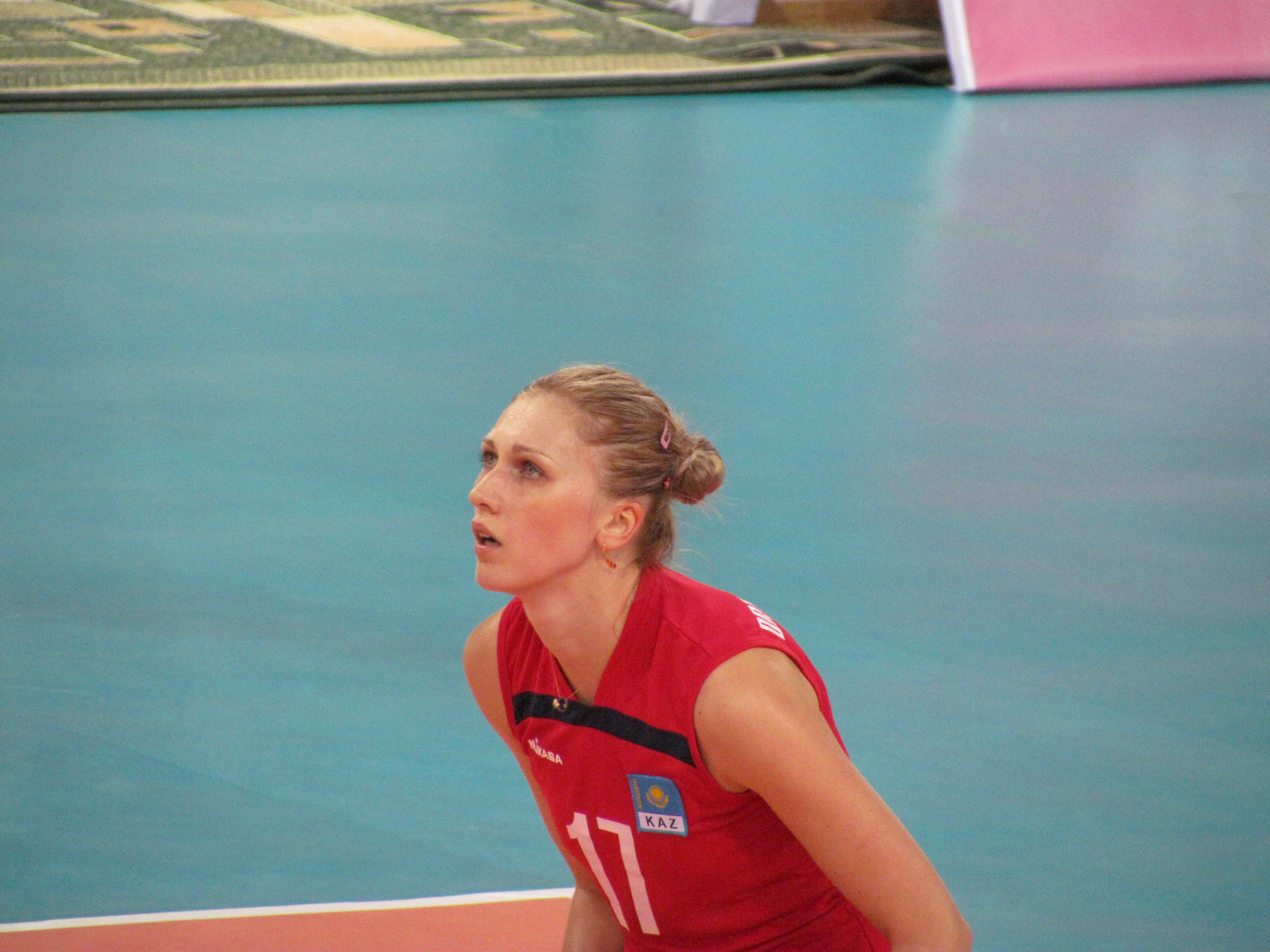

Personal information
- Full name: Olga Kubassevich-Drobyshevskaya
- Nickname: Drobik
- Born: 22 September 1985 (age 41); Zaporizhzhia, Ukrainian SSR, USSR
- Hometown: Ankara, Turkey
- Height: 1.83 m (6 ft 0 in)
- Weight: 62 kg (137 lb)
- Spike: 305 cm (120 in)
- Block: 295 cm (116 in)

Volleyball information
- Position: Opposite
- Current team: Türk Telekom Ankara

National team
Kazakhstan
- Last updated: 30 November 2008

Olga Kubassevich-Drobyshevskaya (born 22 September 1985 in Zaporizhzhia) is a Ukrainian and Kazakhstani volleyball player. She is 183 cm and plays as opposite. She plays for Türk Telekom Ankara. Team since 2007 and wear 5 number.

== Clubs ==
- 2002-2003 ZDIA Zaporizhzhia
- 2004-2005 Jenestra Odesa
- 2007-2009 Türk Telekom Ankara
