= 2012 FIVB World Grand Prix squads =

This article show all participating team squads at the 2012 FIVB World Grand Prix, played by sixteen countries with the final round held in Ningbo, China.

== Argentina ==
The following is the Argentina roster in the 2012 FIVB World Grand Prix.

| # | Name | Date of birth | Height | Weight | Spike | Block |
|---|---|---|---|---|---|---|
| 1 | Lucia Gaido | 19 January 1988 | 164 cm (5 ft 5 in) | 53 kg (117 lb) | 245 cm (8 ft 0 in) | 244 cm (8 ft 0 in) |
| 2 | Josefina Fernandez | 17 August 1991 | 175 cm (5 ft 9 in) | 72 kg (159 lb) | 294 cm (9 ft 8 in) | 284 cm (9 ft 4 in) |
| 3 | Paula Yamila Nizetich | 27 January 1989 | 181 cm (5 ft 11 in) | 74 kg (163 lb) | 305 cm (10 ft 0 in) | 295 cm (9 ft 8 in) |
| 4 | Clarisa Sagardia | 29 June 1989 | 174 cm (5 ft 9 in) | 67 kg (148 lb) | 290 cm (9 ft 6 in) | 280 cm (9 ft 2 in) |
| 5 | Lucia Fresco | 14 May 1991 | 195 cm (6 ft 5 in) | 92 kg (203 lb) | 304 cm (10 ft 0 in) | 290 cm (9 ft 6 in) |
| 6 | Luisina Yaccuzzi | 12 June 1989 | 175 cm (5 ft 9 in) | 70 kg (150 lb) | 300 cm (9 ft 10 in) | 290 cm (9 ft 6 in) |
| 7 | Julieta Puntin | 6 December 1989 | 182 cm (6 ft 0 in) | 73 kg (161 lb) | 302 cm (9 ft 11 in) | 287 cm (9 ft 5 in) |
| 8 | Tatiana Soledad Rizzo | 30 December 1986 | 178 cm (5 ft 10 in) | 64 kg (141 lb) | 280 cm (9 ft 2 in) | 268 cm (8 ft 10 in) |
| 9 | Camila Jersonsky | 30 May 1991 | 181 cm (5 ft 11 in) | 68 kg (150 lb) | 305 cm (10 ft 0 in) | 289 cm (9 ft 6 in) |
| 10 | Emilce Sosa | 11 September 1987 | 177 cm (5 ft 10 in) | 72 kg (159 lb) | 305 cm (10 ft 0 in) | 295 cm (9 ft 8 in) |
| 11 | Georgina Pinedo | 30 May 1981 | 180 cm (5 ft 11 in) | 64 kg (141 lb) | 312 cm (10 ft 3 in) | 290 cm (9 ft 6 in) |
| 12 | Graciela Allende | 7 October 1994 | 167 cm (5 ft 6 in) | 75 kg (165 lb) | 270 cm (8 ft 10 in) | 260 cm (8 ft 6 in) |
| 13 | Leticia Boscacci | 8 November 1985 | 186 cm (6 ft 1 in) | 70 kg (150 lb) | 302 cm (9 ft 11 in) | 284 cm (9 ft 4 in) |
| 14 | Florencia Carlotto | 14 October 1988 | 183 cm (6 ft 0 in) | 72 kg (159 lb) | 302 cm (9 ft 11 in) | 291 cm (9 ft 7 in) |
| 15 | Maria Sol Calvete | 14 September 1994 | 179 cm (5 ft 10 in) | 65 kg (143 lb) | 295 cm (9 ft 8 in) | 283 cm (9 ft 3 in) |
| 16 | Florencia Natasha Busquets Reyes | 27 June 1989 | 192 cm (6 ft 4 in) | 68 kg (150 lb) | 305 cm (10 ft 0 in) | 290 cm (9 ft 6 in) |
| 17 | Antonela Ayelen Curatola | 23 October 1991 | 175 cm (5 ft 9 in) | 71 kg (157 lb) | 290 cm (9 ft 6 in) | 280 cm (9 ft 2 in) |
| 18 | Yael Castiglione | 27 September 1985 | 184 cm (6 ft 0 in) | 75 kg (165 lb) | 295 cm (9 ft 8 in) | 281 cm (9 ft 3 in) |
| 19 | Mariangeles Cossar | 7 April 1990 | 177 cm (5 ft 10 in) | 70 kg (150 lb) | 290 cm (9 ft 6 in) | 280 cm (9 ft 2 in) |
| 20 | Marianela Garbari | 13 November 1980 | 165 cm (5 ft 5 in) | 65 kg (143 lb) | 280 cm (9 ft 2 in) | 270 cm (8 ft 10 in) |

== Brazil ==
The following is the Brazil roster in the 2012 FIVB World Grand Prix.

| # | Name | Date of birth | Height | Weight | Spike | Block |
|---|---|---|---|---|---|---|
| 1 | Fabiana Claudino | 24 January 1985 | 193 cm (6 ft 4 in) | 76 kg (168 lb) | 314 cm (10 ft 4 in) | 293 cm (9 ft 7 in) |
| 2 | Juciely Cristina Barreto | 18 December 1980 | 183 cm (6 ft 0 in) | 80 kg (180 lb) | 298 cm (9 ft 9 in) | 280 cm (9 ft 2 in) |
| 3 | Danielle Lins | 5 January 1985 | 181 cm (5 ft 11 in) | 68 kg (150 lb) | 290 cm (9 ft 6 in) | 276 cm (9 ft 1 in) |
| 4 | Paula Pequeno | 22 January 1982 | 184 cm (6 ft 0 in) | 74 kg (163 lb) | 302 cm (9 ft 11 in) | 285 cm (9 ft 4 in) |
| 5 | Adenizia Silva | 18 December 1986 | 185 cm (6 ft 1 in) | 63 kg (139 lb) | 312 cm (10 ft 3 in) | 290 cm (9 ft 6 in) |
| 6 | Thaisa Menezes | 15 May 1987 | 196 cm (6 ft 5 in) | 79 kg (174 lb) | 316 cm (10 ft 4 in) | 301 cm (9 ft 11 in) |
| 7 | Marianne Steinbrecher | 23 August 1983 | 188 cm (6 ft 2 in) | 70 kg (150 lb) | 310 cm (10 ft 2 in) | 290 cm (9 ft 6 in) |
| 8 | Jaqueline Carvalho | 31 December 1983 | 186 cm (6 ft 1 in) | 70 kg (150 lb) | 302 cm (9 ft 11 in) | 286 cm (9 ft 5 in) |
| 9 | Fernanda Ferreira | 10 January 1980 | 173 cm (5 ft 8 in) | 64 kg (141 lb) | 283 cm (9 ft 3 in) | 264 cm (8 ft 8 in) |
| 10 | Welissa Gonzaga | 9 September 1982 | 179 cm (5 ft 10 in) | 76 kg (168 lb) | 300 cm (9 ft 10 in) | 287 cm (9 ft 5 in) |
| 11 | Tandara Caixeta | 30 October 1988 | 184 cm (6 ft 0 in) | 87 kg (192 lb) | 295 cm (9 ft 8 in) | 285 cm (9 ft 4 in) |
| 12 | Natalia Pereira | 4 April 1989 | 183 cm (6 ft 0 in) | 76 kg (168 lb) | 300 cm (9 ft 10 in) | 288 cm (9 ft 5 in) |
| 13 | Sheilla Castro | 1 July 1983 | 185 cm (6 ft 1 in) | 64 kg (141 lb) | 302 cm (9 ft 11 in) | 284 cm (9 ft 4 in) |
| 14 | Fabiana Oliveira | 7 March 1980 | 169 cm (5 ft 7 in) | 59 kg (130 lb) | 276 cm (9 ft 1 in) | 266 cm (8 ft 9 in) |
| 15 | Joyce Silva | 13 June 1984 | 190 cm (6 ft 3 in) | 67 kg (148 lb) | 311 cm (10 ft 2 in) | 294 cm (9 ft 8 in) |
| 16 | Fernanda Rodrigues | 10 May 1986 | 179 cm (5 ft 10 in) | 74 kg (163 lb) | 308 cm (10 ft 1 in) | 288 cm (9 ft 5 in) |
| 17 | Fabiola de Sousa | 3 February 1983 | 184 cm (6 ft 0 in) | 70 kg (150 lb) | 300 cm (9 ft 10 in) | 285 cm (9 ft 4 in) |
| 18 | Camila Brait | 28 October 1988 | 170 cm (5 ft 7 in) | 58 kg (128 lb) | 271 cm (8 ft 11 in) | 256 cm (8 ft 5 in) |
| 19 | Claudia Silva | 21 September 1987 | 181 cm (5 ft 11 in) | 80 kg (180 lb) | 290 cm (9 ft 6 in) | 266 cm (8 ft 9 in) |
| 20 | Natasha Farinea | 8 February 1986 | 188 cm (6 ft 2 in) | 78 kg (172 lb) | 300 cm (9 ft 10 in) | 288 cm (9 ft 5 in) |
| 21 | Juliana Nogueira | 4 August 1988 | 190 cm (6 ft 3 in) | 71 kg (157 lb) | 307 cm (10 ft 1 in) | 301 cm (9 ft 11 in) |
| 22 | Veridiana Fonseca | 30 December 1982 | 178 cm (5 ft 10 in) | 70 kg (150 lb) | 280 cm (9 ft 2 in) | 271 cm (8 ft 11 in) |
| 23 | Gabriela Guimaraes | 19 May 1994 | 176 cm (5 ft 9 in) | 59 kg (130 lb) | 295 cm (9 ft 8 in) | 274 cm (9 ft 0 in) |
| 24 | Andressa Picussa | 22 July 1989 | 192 cm (6 ft 4 in) | 82 kg (181 lb) | 303 cm (9 ft 11 in) | 293 cm (9 ft 7 in) |
| 25 | Priscila Daroit | 10 August 1988 | 182 cm (6 ft 0 in) | 74 kg (163 lb) | 290 cm (9 ft 6 in) | 280 cm (9 ft 2 in) |

== China ==
The following is the China roster in the 2012 FIVB World Grand Prix.

| # | Name | Date of birth | Height | Weight | Spike | Block |
|---|---|---|---|---|---|---|
| 1 | Wang Yimei | 11 January 1988 | 190 cm (6 ft 3 in) | 87 kg (192 lb) | 318 cm (10 ft 5 in) | 305 cm (10 ft 0 in) |
| 2 | Mi Yang | 24 January 1989 | 180 cm (5 ft 11 in) | 70 kg (150 lb) | 305 cm (10 ft 0 in) | 298 cm (9 ft 9 in) |
| 3 | Yang Jie | 1 March 1994 | 194 cm (6 ft 4 in) | 82 kg (181 lb) | 312 cm (10 ft 3 in) | 300 cm (9 ft 10 in) |
| 4 | Hui Ruoqi | 4 March 1991 | 189 cm (6 ft 2 in) | 70 kg (150 lb) | 312 cm (10 ft 3 in) | 305 cm (10 ft 0 in) |
| 5 | Wang Na | 25 February 1990 | 178 cm (5 ft 10 in) | 63 kg (139 lb) | 305 cm (10 ft 0 in) | 295 cm (9 ft 8 in) |
| 6 | Chu Jinling | 29 July 1984 | 190 cm (6 ft 3 in) | 72 kg (159 lb) | 310 cm (10 ft 2 in) | 302 cm (9 ft 11 in) |
| 7 | Zhang Xian | 16 March 1985 | 168 cm (5 ft 6 in) | 57 kg (126 lb) | 290 cm (9 ft 6 in) | 280 cm (9 ft 2 in) |
| 8 | Wei Qiuyue | 26 September 1988 | 182 cm (6 ft 0 in) | 65 kg (143 lb) | 305 cm (10 ft 0 in) | 300 cm (9 ft 10 in) |
| 9 | Yang Junjing | 15 May 1989 | 190 cm (6 ft 3 in) | 70 kg (150 lb) | 308 cm (10 ft 1 in) | 300 cm (9 ft 10 in) |
| 10 | Shan Danna | 8 October 1991 | 168 cm (5 ft 6 in) | 60 kg (130 lb) | 290 cm (9 ft 6 in) | 285 cm (9 ft 4 in) |
| 11 | Xu Yunli | 2 August 1987 | 196 cm (6 ft 5 in) | 75 kg (165 lb) | 317 cm (10 ft 5 in) | 315 cm (10 ft 4 in) |
| 12 | Zeng Chunlei | 3 November 1989 | 187 cm (6 ft 2 in) | 67 kg (148 lb) | 315 cm (10 ft 4 in) | 315 cm (10 ft 4 in) |
| 13 | Yan Ni | 2 March 1987 | 192 cm (6 ft 4 in) | 74 kg (163 lb) | 317 cm (10 ft 5 in) | 306 cm (10 ft 0 in) |
| 14 | Liu Congcong | 8 December 1990 | 188 cm (6 ft 2 in) | 70 kg (150 lb) | 310 cm (10 ft 2 in) | 305 cm (10 ft 0 in) |
| 15 | Ma Yunwen | 19 October 1986 | 190 cm (6 ft 3 in) | 76 kg (168 lb) | 315 cm (10 ft 4 in) | 307 cm (10 ft 1 in) |
| 16 | Yin Na | 3 February 1988 | 182 cm (6 ft 0 in) | 65 kg (143 lb) | 305 cm (10 ft 0 in) | 300 cm (9 ft 10 in) |
| 17 | Zhang Lei | 11 January 1985 | 181 cm (5 ft 11 in) | 71 kg (157 lb) | 316 cm (10 ft 4 in) | 310 cm (10 ft 2 in) |
| 18 | Fan Linlin | 1 December 1991 | 190 cm (6 ft 3 in) | 77 kg (170 lb) | 316 cm (10 ft 4 in) | 301 cm (9 ft 11 in) |
| 19 | Wang Qian | 14 March 1989 | 174 cm (5 ft 9 in) | 65 kg (143 lb) | 305 cm (10 ft 0 in) | 295 cm (9 ft 8 in) |
| 20 | Chen Liyi | 27 April 1989 | 184 cm (6 ft 0 in) | 75 kg (165 lb) | 302 cm (9 ft 11 in) | 290 cm (9 ft 6 in) |
| 21 | Xue Ming | 23 February 1987 | 193 cm (6 ft 4 in) | 72 kg (159 lb) | 324 cm (10 ft 8 in) | 315 cm (10 ft 4 in) |
| 22 | Yang Zhou | 21 April 1992 | 187 cm (6 ft 2 in) | 71 kg (157 lb) | 308 cm (10 ft 1 in) | 295 cm (9 ft 8 in) |
| 23 | Qiu Yanan | 16 January 1989 | 183 cm (6 ft 0 in) | 62 kg (137 lb) | 295 cm (9 ft 8 in) | 280 cm (9 ft 2 in) |
| 24 | Shen Jingsi | 3 May 1989 | 185 cm (6 ft 1 in) | 78 kg (172 lb) | 305 cm (10 ft 0 in) | 300 cm (9 ft 10 in) |

== Chinese Taipei ==
The following is the Chinese Taipei roster in the 2012 FIVB World Grand Prix.

| # | Name | Date of birth | Height | Weight | Spike | Block |
|---|---|---|---|---|---|---|
| 1 | Teng Yen-min | 9 February 1984 | 172 cm (5 ft 8 in) | 65 kg (143 lb) | 293 cm (9 ft 7 in) | 286 cm (9 ft 5 in) |
| 3 | Lee Yi-hsuan | 2 August 1992 | 164 cm (5 ft 5 in) | 59 kg (130 lb) | 286 cm (9 ft 5 in) | 279 cm (9 ft 2 in) |
| 5 | Wu Ko-jou | 17 November 1985 | 175 cm (5 ft 9 in) | 75 kg (165 lb) | 285 cm (9 ft 4 in) | 275 cm (9 ft 0 in) |
| 6 | Wang Sin-ting | 17 October 1992 | 176 cm (5 ft 9 in) | 61 kg (134 lb) | 278 cm (9 ft 1 in) | 270 cm (8 ft 10 in) |
| 7 | Lee Yi-ping | 8 August 1989 | 177 cm (5 ft 10 in) | 70 kg (150 lb) | 291 cm (9 ft 7 in) | 286 cm (9 ft 5 in) |
| 9 | Liao Wan-ju | 19 April 1984 | 175 cm (5 ft 9 in) | 68 kg (150 lb) | 290 cm (9 ft 6 in) | 275 cm (9 ft 0 in) |
| 10 | Chen Wan-ting | 25 November 1990 | 178 cm (5 ft 10 in) | 67 kg (148 lb) | 290 cm (9 ft 6 in) | 280 cm (9 ft 2 in) |
| 11 | Chen Wan-ching | 16 June 1988 | 167 cm (5 ft 6 in) | 56 kg (123 lb) | 289 cm (9 ft 6 in) | 282 cm (9 ft 3 in) |
| 12 | Yang Meng-hua | 15 August 1991 | 170 cm (5 ft 7 in) | 68 kg (150 lb) | 270 cm (8 ft 10 in) | 262 cm (8 ft 7 in) |
| 13 | Wen I-tzu | 31 October 1991 | 175 cm (5 ft 9 in) | 64 kg (141 lb) | 281 cm (9 ft 3 in) | 273 cm (8 ft 11 in) |
| 14 | Tsai Yin-feng | 6 November 1984 | 181 cm (5 ft 11 in) | 75 kg (165 lb) | 291 cm (9 ft 7 in) | 280 cm (9 ft 2 in) |
| 15 | Yen Pei-ling | 5 January 1986 | 174 cm (5 ft 9 in) | 65 kg (143 lb) | 270 cm (8 ft 10 in) | 268 cm (8 ft 10 in) |

== Cuba ==
The following is the Cuba roster in the 2012 FIVB World Grand Prix.

| # | Name | Date of birth | Height | Weight | Spike | Block |
|---|---|---|---|---|---|---|
| 1 | Wilma Salas Rosell | 9 March 1991 | 188 cm (6 ft 2 in) | 60 kg (130 lb) | 313 cm (10 ft 3 in) | 298 cm (9 ft 9 in) |
| 2 | Yanelis Santos Allegne | 30 March 1986 | 181 cm (5 ft 11 in) | 69 kg (152 lb) | 324 cm (10 ft 8 in) | 304 cm (10 ft 0 in) |
| 3 | Alena Rojas Orta | 9 August 1992 | 186 cm (6 ft 1 in) | 76 kg (168 lb) | 320 cm (10 ft 6 in) | 305 cm (10 ft 0 in) |
| 4 | Yoana Palacio Mendoza | 6 October 1990 | 184 cm (6 ft 0 in) | 67 kg (148 lb) | 313 cm (10 ft 3 in) | 300 cm (9 ft 10 in) |
| 5 | Yunieska Robles Batista | 21 March 1993 | 185 cm (6 ft 1 in) | 67 kg (148 lb) | 308 cm (10 ft 1 in) | 285 cm (9 ft 4 in) |
| 6 | Daymara Lescay Cajigal | 5 September 1992 | 184 cm (6 ft 0 in) | 72 kg (159 lb) | 308 cm (10 ft 1 in) | 290 cm (9 ft 6 in) |
| 7 | Yamila Hernandez Santas | 8 November 1992 | 182 cm (6 ft 0 in) | 69 kg (152 lb) | 301 cm (9 ft 11 in) | 285 cm (9 ft 4 in) |
| 8 | Emily Borrell Cruz | 19 February 1992 | 167 cm (5 ft 6 in) | 55 kg (121 lb) | 270 cm (8 ft 10 in) | 260 cm (8 ft 6 in) |
| 9 | Rachel Sanchez Perez | 9 January 1989 | 188 cm (6 ft 2 in) | 86 kg (190 lb) | 316 cm (10 ft 4 in) | 297 cm (9 ft 9 in) |
| 10 | Ana Lidia Cleger Abel | 27 November 1989 | 183 cm (6 ft 0 in) | 69 kg (152 lb) | 300 cm (9 ft 10 in) | 285 cm (9 ft 4 in) |
| 11 | Liannes Castañeda Simon | 18 October 1986 | 188 cm (6 ft 2 in) | 70 kg (150 lb) | 325 cm (10 ft 8 in) | 320 cm (10 ft 6 in) |
| 12 | Dairilys Cruz Perez | 12 September 1990 | 183 cm (6 ft 0 in) | 65 kg (143 lb) | 310 cm (10 ft 2 in) | 305 cm (10 ft 0 in) |
| 13 | Rosanna Giel Ramos | 10 June 1992 | 187 cm (6 ft 2 in) | 62 kg (137 lb) | 320 cm (10 ft 6 in) | 315 cm (10 ft 4 in) |
| 14 | Dayami Sanchez Savon | 14 March 1994 | 188 cm (6 ft 2 in) | 64 kg (141 lb) | 314 cm (10 ft 4 in) | 302 cm (9 ft 11 in) |
| 15 | Yusidey Silie Frometa | 11 November 1984 | 183 cm (6 ft 0 in) | 80 kg (180 lb) | 316 cm (10 ft 4 in) | 300 cm (9 ft 10 in) |
| 16 | Yaremis de la Caridad Mendaro Leyva | 21 April 1994 | 187 cm (6 ft 2 in) | 71 kg (157 lb) | 310 cm (10 ft 2 in) | 300 cm (9 ft 10 in) |
| 17 | Gyselle de la Caridad Silva Franco | 29 October 1991 | 184 cm (6 ft 0 in) | 70 kg (150 lb) | 302 cm (9 ft 11 in) | 295 cm (9 ft 8 in) |
| 18 | Sulian Matienzo Linares | 14 December 1994 | 178 cm (5 ft 10 in) | 67 kg (148 lb) | 318 cm (10 ft 5 in) | 314 cm (10 ft 4 in) |
| 19 | Jennifer Alvarez Hernandez | 29 November 1993 | 184 cm (6 ft 0 in) | 72 kg (159 lb) | 310 cm (10 ft 2 in) | 294 cm (9 ft 8 in) |
| 20 | Heydi Rodríguez López | 24 June 1993 | 184 cm (6 ft 0 in) | 74 kg (163 lb) | 310 cm (10 ft 2 in) | 305 cm (10 ft 0 in) |

== Dominican Republic ==
The following is the Dominican Republic roster in the 2012 FIVB World Grand Prix.

| # | Name | Date of birth | Height | Weight | Spike | Block |
|---|---|---|---|---|---|---|
| 1 | Annerys Victoria Vargas Valdez | 7 August 1981 | 196 cm (6 ft 5 in) | 70 kg (150 lb) | 327 cm (10 ft 9 in) | 320 cm (10 ft 6 in) |
| 2 | Winifer Maria Fernandez Perez | 6 January 1995 | 169 cm (5 ft 7 in) | 62 kg (137 lb) | 270 cm (8 ft 10 in) | 265 cm (8 ft 8 in) |
| 3 | Lisvel Elisa Eve Mejia | 10 September 1991 | 194 cm (6 ft 4 in) | 70 kg (150 lb) | 325 cm (10 ft 8 in) | 315 cm (10 ft 4 in) |
| 4 | Marianne Fersola Norberto | 16 January 1992 | 191 cm (6 ft 3 in) | 60 kg (130 lb) | 315 cm (10 ft 4 in) | 310 cm (10 ft 2 in) |
| 5 | Brenda Castillo | 5 June 1992 | 167 cm (5 ft 6 in) | 55 kg (121 lb) | 245 cm (8 ft 0 in) | 230 cm (7 ft 7 in) |
| 6 | Carmen Rosa Caso Sierra | 29 November 1981 | 168 cm (5 ft 6 in) | 59 kg (130 lb) | 240 cm (7 ft 10 in) | 230 cm (7 ft 7 in) |
| 7 | Niverka Dharlenis Marte Frica | 19 October 1990 | 178 cm (5 ft 10 in) | 71 kg (157 lb) | 295 cm (9 ft 8 in) | 283 cm (9 ft 3 in) |
| 8 | Candida Estefany Arias Perez | 11 March 1992 | 194 cm (6 ft 4 in) | 68 kg (150 lb) | 320 cm (10 ft 6 in) | 315 cm (10 ft 4 in) |
| 9 | Sidarka De Los Milagros Nuñez | 25 June 1984 | 185 cm (6 ft 1 in) | 62 kg (137 lb) | 330 cm (10 ft 10 in) | 320 cm (10 ft 6 in) |
| 10 | Milagros Cabral De La Cruz | 17 October 1978 | 182 cm (6 ft 0 in) | 63 kg (139 lb) | 325 cm (10 ft 8 in) | 320 cm (10 ft 6 in) |
| 11 | Jeoselyna Rodriguez Santos | 9 December 1991 | 187 cm (6 ft 2 in) | 63 kg (139 lb) | 325 cm (10 ft 8 in) | 315 cm (10 ft 4 in) |
| 12 | Karla Miguelina Echenique Medina | 16 May 1986 | 180 cm (5 ft 11 in) | 65 kg (143 lb) | 300 cm (9 ft 10 in) | 290 cm (9 ft 6 in) |
| 13 | Cindy Carolina Rondon Martinez | 12 November 1987 | 186 cm (6 ft 1 in) | 61 kg (134 lb) | 320 cm (10 ft 6 in) | 315 cm (10 ft 4 in) |
| 14 | Prisilla Altagracia Rivera Brens | 29 December 1984 | 186 cm (6 ft 1 in) | 70 kg (150 lb) | 320 cm (10 ft 6 in) | 315 cm (10 ft 4 in) |
| 15 | Celenia Toribio De Leon | 17 July 1994 | 181 cm (5 ft 11 in) | 69 kg (152 lb) | 290 cm (9 ft 6 in) | 286 cm (9 ft 5 in) |
| 16 | Yonkaira Paola Peña Isabel | 10 May 1993 | 190 cm (6 ft 3 in) | 70 kg (150 lb) | 320 cm (10 ft 6 in) | 310 cm (10 ft 2 in) |
| 17 | Gina Altagracia Mambru Casilla | 21 January 1986 | 182 cm (6 ft 0 in) | 65 kg (143 lb) | 330 cm (10 ft 10 in) | 315 cm (10 ft 4 in) |
| 18 | Bethania De La Cruz De Peña | 13 May 1987 | 188 cm (6 ft 2 in) | 70 kg (150 lb) | 330 cm (10 ft 10 in) | 320 cm (10 ft 6 in) |
| 19 | Yeniffer Cristina Ramirez Espinal | 17 March 1993 | 183 cm (6 ft 0 in) | 67 kg (148 lb) | 285 cm (9 ft 4 in) | 289 cm (9 ft 6 in) |
| 20 | Brayelin Elizabeth Martinez | 11 September 1996 | 197 cm (6 ft 6 in) | 76 kg (168 lb) | 330 cm (10 ft 10 in) | 320 cm (10 ft 6 in) |

== Germany ==
The following is the Germany roster in the 2012 FIVB World Grand Prix.

| # | Name | Date of birth | Height | Weight | Spike | Block |
|---|---|---|---|---|---|---|
| 1 | Lenka Dürr | 10 December 1990 | 171 cm (5 ft 7 in) | 59 kg (130 lb) | 280 cm (9 ft 2 in) | 270 cm (8 ft 10 in) |
| 2 | Kathleen Weiß | 2 February 1984 | 171 cm (5 ft 7 in) | 66 kg (146 lb) | 290 cm (9 ft 6 in) | 273 cm (8 ft 11 in) |
| 3 | Denise Hanke | 31 August 1989 | 179 cm (5 ft 10 in) | 58 kg (128 lb) | 284 cm (9 ft 4 in) | 272 cm (8 ft 11 in) |
| 4 | Kerstin Tzscherlich | 15 February 1978 | 179 cm (5 ft 10 in) | 72 kg (159 lb) | 295 cm (9 ft 8 in) | 282 cm (9 ft 3 in) |
| 5 | Anja Brandt | 15 February 1990 | 195 cm (6 ft 5 in) | 77 kg (170 lb) | 310 cm (10 ft 2 in) | 295 cm (9 ft 8 in) |
| 6 | Kathy Radzuweit | 2 March 1982 | 196 cm (6 ft 5 in) | 76 kg (168 lb) | 319 cm (10 ft 6 in) | 300 cm (9 ft 10 in) |
| 7 | Angelina Hübner-Grün | 2 December 1979 | 185 cm (6 ft 1 in) | 74 kg (163 lb) | 309 cm (10 ft 2 in) | 287 cm (9 ft 5 in) |
| 8 | Berit Kauffeldt | 8 July 1990 | 190 cm (6 ft 3 in) | 75 kg (165 lb) | 311 cm (10 ft 2 in) | 294 cm (9 ft 8 in) |
| 9 | Corina Ssuschke-Voigt | 9 May 1983 | 189 cm (6 ft 2 in) | 75 kg (165 lb) | 310 cm (10 ft 2 in) | 298 cm (9 ft 9 in) |
| 10 | Anne Matthes | 30 April 1985 | 182 cm (6 ft 0 in) | 66 kg (146 lb) | 312 cm (10 ft 3 in) | 295 cm (9 ft 8 in) |
| 11 | Christiane Fürst | 29 March 1985 | 193 cm (6 ft 4 in) | 80 kg (180 lb) | 323 cm (10 ft 7 in) | 307 cm (10 ft 1 in) |
| 12 | Heike Beier | 9 December 1983 | 184 cm (6 ft 0 in) | 73 kg (161 lb) | 305 cm (10 ft 0 in) | 293 cm (9 ft 7 in) |
| 13 | Saskia Hippe | 16 January 1991 | 185 cm (6 ft 1 in) | 67 kg (148 lb) | 315 cm (10 ft 4 in) | 292 cm (9 ft 7 in) |
| 14 | Margareta Kozuch | 30 October 1986 | 187 cm (6 ft 2 in) | 70 kg (150 lb) | 309 cm (10 ft 2 in) | 297 cm (9 ft 9 in) |
| 15 | Maren Brinker | 10 July 1986 | 184 cm (6 ft 0 in) | 68 kg (150 lb) | 303 cm (9 ft 11 in) | 295 cm (9 ft 8 in) |
| 16 | Lisa Thomsen | 20 August 1985 | 172 cm (5 ft 8 in) | 68 kg (150 lb) | 290 cm (9 ft 6 in) | 285 cm (9 ft 4 in) |
| 17 | Lena Möllers | 6 January 1990 | 188 cm (6 ft 2 in) | 74 kg (163 lb) | 312 cm (10 ft 3 in) | 297 cm (9 ft 9 in) |
| 18 | Nadja Schaus | 8 November 1984 | 187 cm (6 ft 2 in) | 66 kg (146 lb) | 305 cm (10 ft 0 in) | 295 cm (9 ft 8 in) |
| 19 | Regina Burchardt | 1 July 1983 | 186 cm (6 ft 1 in) | 77 kg (170 lb) | 302 cm (9 ft 11 in) | 294 cm (9 ft 8 in) |
| 20 | Mareen Apitz | 26 March 1987 | 183 cm (6 ft 0 in) | 73 kg (161 lb) | 295 cm (9 ft 8 in) | 284 cm (9 ft 4 in) |
| 21 | Claudia Steger | 10 March 1990 | 178 cm (5 ft 10 in) | 70 kg (150 lb) | 301 cm (9 ft 11 in) | 284 cm (9 ft 4 in) |
| 22 | Friederike Thieme | 16 April 1987 | 187 cm (6 ft 2 in) | 73 kg (161 lb) | 302 cm (9 ft 11 in) | 292 cm (9 ft 7 in) |
| 23 | Luise Mauersberger | 2 July 1990 | 188 cm (6 ft 2 in) | 80 kg (180 lb) | 296 cm (9 ft 9 in) | 290 cm (9 ft 6 in) |
| 24 | Sarah Petrausch | 31 July 1990 | 187 cm (6 ft 2 in) | 85 kg (187 lb) | 306 cm (10 ft 0 in) | 295 cm (9 ft 8 in) |

== Italy ==
The following is the Italy roster in the 2012 FIVB World Grand Prix.

| # | Name | Date of birth | Height | Weight | Spike | Block |
|---|---|---|---|---|---|---|
| 1 | Sara Anzanello | 30 July 1980 | 193 cm (6 ft 4 in) | 78 kg (172 lb) | 316 cm (10 ft 4 in) | 298 cm (9 ft 9 in) |
| 2 | Cristina Barcellini | 20 November 1986 | 183 cm (6 ft 0 in) | 78 kg (172 lb) | 307 cm (10 ft 1 in) | 292 cm (9 ft 7 in) |
| 3 | Paola Croce | 6 March 1978 | 167 cm (5 ft 6 in) | 52 kg (115 lb) | 290 cm (9 ft 6 in) | 265 cm (8 ft 8 in) |
| 4 | Letizia Camera | 1 October 1992 | 175 cm (5 ft 9 in) | 62 kg (137 lb) | 285 cm (9 ft 4 in) | 270 cm (8 ft 10 in) |
| 5 | Giulia Rondon | 16 October 1987 | 189 cm (6 ft 2 in) | 74 kg (163 lb) | 304 cm (10 ft 0 in) | 280 cm (9 ft 2 in) |
| 6 | Monica De Gennaro | 8 January 1987 | 174 cm (5 ft 9 in) | 67 kg (148 lb) | 292 cm (9 ft 7 in) | 270 cm (8 ft 10 in) |
| 7 | Martina Guiggi | 1 May 1984 | 187 cm (6 ft 2 in) | 80 kg (180 lb) | 315 cm (10 ft 4 in) | 290 cm (9 ft 6 in) |
| 8 | Jenny Barazza | 24 July 1981 | 188 cm (6 ft 2 in) | 77 kg (170 lb) | 300 cm (9 ft 10 in) | 285 cm (9 ft 4 in) |
| 9 | Caterina Bosetti | 2 February 1994 | 179 cm (5 ft 10 in) | 59 kg (130 lb) | 299 cm (9 ft 10 in) | 281 cm (9 ft 3 in) |
| 10 | Paola Cardullo | 18 March 1982 | 159 cm (5 ft 3 in) | 56 kg (123 lb) | 275 cm (9 ft 0 in) | 268 cm (8 ft 10 in) |
| 11 | Serena Ortolani | 7 January 1987 | 187 cm (6 ft 2 in) | 63 kg (139 lb) | 308 cm (10 ft 1 in) | 288 cm (9 ft 5 in) |
| 12 | Francesca Piccinini | 10 January 1979 | 184 cm (6 ft 0 in) | 71 kg (157 lb) | 304 cm (10 ft 0 in) | 279 cm (9 ft 2 in) |
| 13 | Valentina Arrighetti | 26 January 1985 | 185 cm (6 ft 1 in) | 72 kg (159 lb) | 318 cm (10 ft 5 in) | 310 cm (10 ft 2 in) |
| 14 | Eleonora Lo Bianco | 22 December 1979 | 171 cm (5 ft 7 in) | 67 kg (148 lb) | 287 cm (9 ft 5 in) | 273 cm (8 ft 11 in) |
| 15 | Antonella Del Core | 5 November 1980 | 180 cm (5 ft 11 in) | 70 kg (150 lb) | 296 cm (9 ft 9 in) | 279 cm (9 ft 2 in) |
| 16 | Lucia Bosetti | 9 July 1989 | 175 cm (5 ft 9 in) | 65 kg (143 lb) | 316 cm (10 ft 4 in) | 286 cm (9 ft 5 in) |
| 17 | Simona Gioli | 17 September 1977 | 185 cm (6 ft 1 in) | 70 kg (150 lb) | 307 cm (10 ft 1 in) | 283 cm (9 ft 3 in) |
| 18 | Carolina del Pilar Costagrande | 15 October 1980 | 188 cm (6 ft 2 in) | 80 kg (180 lb) | 312 cm (10 ft 3 in) | 291 cm (9 ft 7 in) |
| 19 | Raphaela Folie | 7 March 1991 | 186 cm (6 ft 1 in) | 82 kg (181 lb) | 307 cm (10 ft 1 in) | 283 cm (9 ft 3 in) |
| 20 | Alessia Gennari | 3 November 1991 | 184 cm (6 ft 0 in) | 68 kg (150 lb) | 302 cm (9 ft 11 in) | 284 cm (9 ft 4 in) |
| 21 | Immacolata Sirressi | 19 May 1990 | 175 cm (5 ft 9 in) | 62 kg (137 lb) | 284 cm (9 ft 4 in) | 260 cm (8 ft 6 in) |
| 22 | Giulia Pisani | 4 June 1992 | 184 cm (6 ft 0 in) | 69 kg (152 lb) | 313 cm (10 ft 3 in) | 298 cm (9 ft 9 in) |
| 23 | Noemi Signorile | 15 February 1990 | 182 cm (6 ft 0 in) | 70 kg (150 lb) | 294 cm (9 ft 8 in) | 290 cm (9 ft 6 in) |
| 24 | Valentina Zago | 21 February 1990 | 186 cm (6 ft 1 in) | 77 kg (170 lb) | 305 cm (10 ft 0 in) | 284 cm (9 ft 4 in) |
| 25 | Gilda Lombardo | 2 July 1989 | 183 cm (6 ft 0 in) | 61 kg (134 lb) | 305 cm (10 ft 0 in) | 293 cm (9 ft 7 in) |

== Japan ==
The following is the Japan roster in the 2012 FIVB World Grand Prix.

| # | Name | Date of birth | Height | Weight | Spike | Block |
|---|---|---|---|---|---|---|
| 1 | Megumi Kurihara | 31 July 1984 | 187 cm (6 ft 2 in) | 69 kg (152 lb) | 308 cm (10 ft 1 in) | 295 cm (9 ft 8 in) |
| 2 | Hitomi Nakamichi | 18 September 1985 | 159 cm (5 ft 3 in) | 53 kg (117 lb) | 270 cm (8 ft 10 in) | 256 cm (8 ft 5 in) |
| 3 | Yoshie Takeshita | 18 March 1978 | 159 cm (5 ft 3 in) | 53 kg (117 lb) | 280 cm (9 ft 2 in) | 270 cm (8 ft 10 in) |
| 4 | Kaori Inoue | 21 October 1982 | 182 cm (6 ft 0 in) | 59 kg (130 lb) | 306 cm (10 ft 0 in) | 300 cm (9 ft 10 in) |
| 5 | Ai Otomo | 24 March 1982 | 184 cm (6 ft 0 in) | 68 kg (150 lb) | 312 cm (10 ft 3 in) | 305 cm (10 ft 0 in) |
| 6 | Yuko Sano | 26 July 1979 | 159 cm (5 ft 3 in) | 54 kg (119 lb) | 260 cm (8 ft 6 in) | 250 cm (8 ft 2 in) |
| 7 | Mai Yamaguchi | 3 July 1983 | 176 cm (5 ft 9 in) | 62 kg (137 lb) | 304 cm (10 ft 0 in) | 292 cm (9 ft 7 in) |
| 8 | Kotoki Zayasu | 11 January 1990 | 159 cm (5 ft 3 in) | 57 kg (126 lb) | 270 cm (8 ft 10 in) | 255 cm (8 ft 4 in) |
| 9 | Mizuho Ishida | 22 January 1988 | 174 cm (5 ft 9 in) | 65 kg (143 lb) | 301 cm (9 ft 11 in) | 286 cm (9 ft 5 in) |
| 10 | Nana Iwasaka | 3 July 1990 | 187 cm (6 ft 2 in) | 72 kg (159 lb) | 300 cm (9 ft 10 in) | 285 cm (9 ft 4 in) |
| 11 | Erika Araki | 3 August 1984 | 186 cm (6 ft 1 in) | 78 kg (172 lb) | 307 cm (10 ft 1 in) | 295 cm (9 ft 8 in) |
| 12 | Saori Kimura | 19 August 1986 | 185 cm (6 ft 1 in) | 65 kg (143 lb) | 304 cm (10 ft 0 in) | 293 cm (9 ft 7 in) |
| 13 | Risa Shinnabe | 11 July 1990 | 173 cm (5 ft 8 in) | 66 kg (146 lb) | 295 cm (9 ft 8 in) | 268 cm (8 ft 10 in) |
| 14 | Yukiko Ebata | 7 November 1989 | 176 cm (5 ft 9 in) | 67 kg (148 lb) | 305 cm (10 ft 0 in) | 298 cm (9 ft 9 in) |
| 15 | Maiko Kano | 15 July 1988 | 185 cm (6 ft 1 in) | 72 kg (159 lb) | 303 cm (9 ft 11 in) | 285 cm (9 ft 4 in) |
| 16 | Saori Sakoda | 18 December 1987 | 175 cm (5 ft 9 in) | 63 kg (139 lb) | 305 cm (10 ft 0 in) | 279 cm (9 ft 2 in) |
| 17 | Kanako Hirai | 15 April 1984 | 183 cm (6 ft 0 in) | 69 kg (152 lb) | 309 cm (10 ft 2 in) | 290 cm (9 ft 6 in) |
| 18 | Riho Otake | 23 December 1993 | 182 cm (6 ft 0 in) | 68 kg (150 lb) | 306 cm (10 ft 0 in) | 296 cm (9 ft 9 in) |
| 19 | Kanari Hamaguchi | 29 August 1985 | 167 cm (5 ft 6 in) | 60 kg (130 lb) | 283 cm (9 ft 3 in) | 269 cm (8 ft 10 in) |
| 20 | Haruka Miyashita | 1 September 1994 | 177 cm (5 ft 10 in) | 61 kg (134 lb) | 298 cm (9 ft 9 in) | 272 cm (8 ft 11 in) |
| 21 | Ayumi Nakamura | 29 August 1990 | 176 cm (5 ft 9 in) | 70 kg (150 lb) | 294 cm (9 ft 8 in) | 278 cm (9 ft 1 in) |
| 22 | Mai Okumura | 31 October 1990 | 177 cm (5 ft 10 in) | 67 kg (148 lb) | 300 cm (9 ft 10 in) | 280 cm (9 ft 2 in) |
| 23 | Yuki Ishii | 8 May 1991 | 180 cm (5 ft 11 in) | 68 kg (150 lb) | 302 cm (9 ft 11 in) | 286 cm (9 ft 5 in) |
| 24 | Miyu Nagaoka | 25 July 1991 | 179 cm (5 ft 10 in) | 68 kg (150 lb) | 310 cm (10 ft 2 in) | 298 cm (9 ft 9 in) |
| 25 | Rika Nomoto | 21 September 1991 | 179 cm (5 ft 10 in) | 70 kg (150 lb) | 310 cm (10 ft 2 in) | 279 cm (9 ft 2 in) |

== South Korea ==
The following is the South Korea roster in the 2012 FIVB World Grand Prix.

| # | Name | Date of birth | Height | Weight | Spike | Block |
|---|---|---|---|---|---|---|
| 1 | Bae Yoo-na | 30 November 1989 | 180 cm (5 ft 11 in) | 67 kg (148 lb) | 303 cm (9 ft 11 in) | 294 cm (9 ft 8 in) |
| 2 | Yeum Hye-seon | 3 February 1991 | 177 cm (5 ft 10 in) | 65 kg (143 lb) | 302 cm (9 ft 11 in) | 291 cm (9 ft 7 in) |
| 3 | Ha Joon-eem | 26 December 1989 | 189 cm (6 ft 2 in) | 74 kg (163 lb) | 287 cm (9 ft 5 in) | 281 cm (9 ft 3 in) |
| 4 | Kim Sa-nee | 21 June 1981 | 180 cm (5 ft 11 in) | 75 kg (165 lb) | 302 cm (9 ft 11 in) | 292 cm (9 ft 7 in) |
| 5 | Kim Hae-ran | 16 March 1984 | 168 cm (5 ft 6 in) | 60 kg (130 lb) | 280 cm (9 ft 2 in) | 270 cm (8 ft 10 in) |
| 6 | Kim Su-ji | 11 July 1987 | 186 cm (6 ft 1 in) | 68 kg (150 lb) | 303 cm (9 ft 11 in) | 294 cm (9 ft 8 in) |
| 7 | Lim Hyo-sook | 26 April 1982 | 177 cm (5 ft 10 in) | 75 kg (165 lb) | 278 cm (9 ft 1 in) | 270 cm (8 ft 10 in) |
| 8 | Nam Jie-youn | 25 May 1983 | 172 cm (5 ft 8 in) | 63 kg (139 lb) | 285 cm (9 ft 4 in) | 273 cm (8 ft 11 in) |
| 9 | Park Jeong-ah | 26 March 1993 | 185 cm (6 ft 1 in) | 68 kg (150 lb) | 300 cm (9 ft 10 in) | 290 cm (9 ft 6 in) |
| 10 | Kim Yeon-koung | 26 February 1988 | 192 cm (6 ft 4 in) | 73 kg (161 lb) | 307 cm (10 ft 1 in) | 299 cm (9 ft 10 in) |
| 11 | Han Yoo-mi | 5 February 1982 | 180 cm (5 ft 11 in) | 65 kg (143 lb) | 307 cm (10 ft 1 in) | 297 cm (9 ft 9 in) |
| 12 | Han Song-yi | 5 September 1984 | 186 cm (6 ft 1 in) | 65 kg (143 lb) | 305 cm (10 ft 0 in) | 298 cm (9 ft 9 in) |
| 13 | Jung Dae-young | 12 August 1981 | 183 cm (6 ft 0 in) | 71 kg (157 lb) | 303 cm (9 ft 11 in) | 292 cm (9 ft 7 in) |
| 14 | Hwang Youn-joo | 13 August 1986 | 177 cm (5 ft 10 in) | 68 kg (150 lb) | 303 cm (9 ft 11 in) | 294 cm (9 ft 8 in) |
| 15 | Jung Ji-youn | 28 June 1980 | 178 cm (5 ft 10 in) | 64 kg (141 lb) | 295 cm (9 ft 8 in) | 284 cm (9 ft 4 in) |
| 16 | Yoon Hye-suk | 19 June 1983 | 174 cm (5 ft 9 in) | 60 kg (130 lb) | 293 cm (9 ft 7 in) | 283 cm (9 ft 3 in) |
| 17 | Yang Hyo-jin | 14 December 1989 | 190 cm (6 ft 3 in) | 72 kg (159 lb) | 287 cm (9 ft 5 in) | 280 cm (9 ft 2 in) |
| 18 | Kim Hye-jin | 17 February 1989 | 180 cm (5 ft 11 in) | 62 kg (137 lb) | 284 cm (9 ft 4 in) | 274 cm (9 ft 0 in) |
| 19 | Kim Hee-jin | 29 April 1991 | 185 cm (6 ft 1 in) | 77 kg (170 lb) | 300 cm (9 ft 10 in) | 295 cm (9 ft 8 in) |
| 20 | Lee Sook-ja | 17 June 1980 | 175 cm (5 ft 9 in) | 58 kg (128 lb) | 286 cm (9 ft 5 in) | 264 cm (8 ft 8 in) |
| 21 | Kim Min-ji | 25 May 1985 | 187 cm (6 ft 2 in) | 75 kg (165 lb) | 304 cm (10 ft 0 in) | 296 cm (9 ft 9 in) |
| 22 | Lee Bo-lam | 8 August 1988 | 185 cm (6 ft 1 in) | 75 kg (165 lb) | 283 cm (9 ft 3 in) | 274 cm (9 ft 0 in) |
| 23 | Lee Hyo-hee | 9 September 1980 | 173 cm (5 ft 8 in) | 60 kg (130 lb) | 280 cm (9 ft 2 in) | 271 cm (8 ft 11 in) |
| 24 | Han Soo-ji | 1 February 1989 | 182 cm (6 ft 0 in) | 78 kg (172 lb) | 305 cm (10 ft 0 in) | 296 cm (9 ft 9 in) |
| 25 | Yim Myung-ok | 5 May 1986 | 176 cm (5 ft 9 in) | 65 kg (143 lb) | 278 cm (9 ft 1 in) | 266 cm (8 ft 9 in) |

== Poland ==
The following is the Poland roster in the 2012 FIVB World Grand Prix.

| # | Name | Date of birth | Height | Weight | Spike | Block |
|---|---|---|---|---|---|---|
| 1 | Anna Podolec | 30 October 1985 | 193 cm (6 ft 4 in) | 71 kg (157 lb) | 318 cm (10 ft 5 in) | 305 cm (10 ft 0 in) |
| 2 | Krystyna Strasz | 24 July 1987 | 165 cm (5 ft 5 in) | 55 kg (121 lb) | 0 cm (0 in) | 252 cm (8 ft 3 in) |
| 3 | Karolina Rozycka | 28 June 1985 | 183 cm (6 ft 0 in) | 68 kg (150 lb) | 305 cm (10 ft 0 in) | 284 cm (9 ft 4 in) |
| 4 | Izabela Belcik | 29 November 1980 | 185 cm (6 ft 1 in) | 65 kg (143 lb) | 304 cm (10 ft 0 in) | 292 cm (9 ft 7 in) |
| 5 | Berenika Tomsia | 18 March 1988 | 188 cm (6 ft 2 in) | 72 kg (159 lb) | 310 cm (10 ft 2 in) | 302 cm (9 ft 11 in) |
| 6 | Agnieszka Bednarek-Kasza | 20 February 1986 | 185 cm (6 ft 1 in) | 71 kg (157 lb) | 310 cm (10 ft 2 in) | 295 cm (9 ft 8 in) |
| 7 | Joanna Kaczor | 16 September 1984 | 191 cm (6 ft 3 in) | 64 kg (141 lb) | 305 cm (10 ft 0 in) | 290 cm (9 ft 6 in) |
| 8 | Katarzyna Skorupa | 16 September 1984 | 183 cm (6 ft 0 in) | 69 kg (152 lb) | 302 cm (9 ft 11 in) | 296 cm (9 ft 9 in) |
| 9 | Ewelina Sieczka | 26 January 1988 | 182 cm (6 ft 0 in) | 68 kg (150 lb) | 308 cm (10 ft 1 in) | 280 cm (9 ft 2 in) |
| 10 | Kinga Kasprzak | 12 June 1987 | 188 cm (6 ft 2 in) | 76 kg (168 lb) | 310 cm (10 ft 2 in) | 295 cm (9 ft 8 in) |
| 11 | Anna Werblinska | 14 May 1984 | 178 cm (5 ft 10 in) | 66 kg (146 lb) | 308 cm (10 ft 1 in) | 292 cm (9 ft 7 in) |
| 12 | Izabela Kowalinska | 23 February 1985 | 186 cm (6 ft 1 in) | 77 kg (170 lb) | 300 cm (9 ft 10 in) | 283 cm (9 ft 3 in) |
| 13 | Paulina Maj | 22 March 1987 | 166 cm (5 ft 5 in) | 58 kg (128 lb) | 277 cm (9 ft 1 in) | 255 cm (8 ft 4 in) |
| 14 | Joanna Wolosz | 7 April 1990 | 181 cm (5 ft 11 in) | 65 kg (143 lb) | 303 cm (9 ft 11 in) | 281 cm (9 ft 3 in) |
| 15 | Katarzyna Gajgal | 21 September 1981 | 190 cm (6 ft 3 in) | 85 kg (187 lb) | 300 cm (9 ft 10 in) | 287 cm (9 ft 5 in) |
| 16 | Elzbieta Skowronska | 6 July 1983 | 183 cm (6 ft 0 in) | 71 kg (157 lb) | 305 cm (10 ft 0 in) | 280 cm (9 ft 2 in) |
| 17 | Katarzyna Skowronska-Dolata | 30 June 1983 | 189 cm (6 ft 2 in) | 75 kg (165 lb) | 314 cm (10 ft 4 in) | 296 cm (9 ft 9 in) |
| 18 | Maja Tokarska | 22 February 1991 | 193 cm (6 ft 4 in) | 72 kg (159 lb) | 303 cm (9 ft 11 in) | 292 cm (9 ft 7 in) |
| 19 | Monika Ptak | 14 May 1990 | 187 cm (6 ft 2 in) | 72 kg (159 lb) | 310 cm (10 ft 2 in) | 289 cm (9 ft 6 in) |
| 20 | Klaudia Kaczorowska | 20 December 1988 | 184 cm (6 ft 0 in) | 68 kg (150 lb) | 303 cm (9 ft 11 in) | 281 cm (9 ft 3 in) |
| 21 | Paulina Glaz | 4 January 1994 | 184 cm (6 ft 0 in) | 72 kg (159 lb) | 303 cm (9 ft 11 in) | 287 cm (9 ft 5 in) |
| 22 | Zuzanna Czyznielewska | 24 April 1992 | 186 cm (6 ft 1 in) | 69 kg (152 lb) | 300 cm (9 ft 10 in) | 279 cm (9 ft 2 in) |
| 23 | Iga Chojnacka | 21 April 1994 | 183 cm (6 ft 0 in) | 68 kg (150 lb) | 300 cm (9 ft 10 in) | 280 cm (9 ft 2 in) |
| 24 | Agnieszka Kakolewska | 17 October 1994 | 197 cm (6 ft 6 in) | 75 kg (165 lb) | 309 cm (10 ft 2 in) | 295 cm (9 ft 8 in) |
| 25 | Dorota Wilk | 28 April 1988 | 178 cm (5 ft 10 in) | 66 kg (146 lb) | 290 cm (9 ft 6 in) | 0 cm (0 in) |

== Puerto Rico ==
The following is the Puerto Rico roster in the 2012 FIVB World Grand Prix.

| # | Name | Date of birth | Height | Weight | Spike | Block |
|---|---|---|---|---|---|---|
| 1 | Debora Seilhamer | 4 October 1985 | 166 cm (5 ft 5 in) | 61 kg (134 lb) | 245 cm (8 ft 0 in) | 240 cm (7 ft 10 in) |
| 2 | Shara Venegas | 18 September 1992 | 173 cm (5 ft 8 in) | 68 kg (150 lb) | 280 cm (9 ft 2 in) | 272 cm (8 ft 11 in) |
| 3 | Vilmarie Mojica | 13 August 1985 | 180 cm (5 ft 11 in) | 63 kg (139 lb) | 295 cm (9 ft 8 in) | 288 cm (9 ft 5 in) |
| 4 | Tatiana Encarnación | 28 July 1985 | 182 cm (6 ft 0 in) | 72 kg (159 lb) | 300 cm (9 ft 10 in) | 279 cm (9 ft 2 in) |
| 5 | Sarai Alvarez | 3 April 1986 | 183 cm (6 ft 0 in) | 61 kg (134 lb) | 295 cm (9 ft 8 in) | 286 cm (9 ft 5 in) |
| 6 | Yarimar Rosa | 20 June 1988 | 178 cm (5 ft 10 in) | 62 kg (137 lb) | 295 cm (9 ft 8 in) | 285 cm (9 ft 4 in) |
| 7 | Stephanie Enright | 15 December 1990 | 179 cm (5 ft 10 in) | 56 kg (123 lb) | 300 cm (9 ft 10 in) | 292 cm (9 ft 7 in) |
| 8 | Shanon Torregrosa | 11 February 1981 | 188 cm (6 ft 2 in) | 85 kg (187 lb) | 301 cm (9 ft 11 in) | 297 cm (9 ft 9 in) |
| 9 | Aurea Cruz | 10 January 1982 | 180 cm (5 ft 11 in) | 63 kg (139 lb) | 310 cm (10 ft 2 in) | 290 cm (9 ft 6 in) |
| 10 | Genesis Collazo | 4 October 1992 | 185 cm (6 ft 1 in) | 74 kg (163 lb) | 301 cm (9 ft 11 in) | 296 cm (9 ft 9 in) |
| 11 | Karina Ocasio | 1 August 1985 | 192 cm (6 ft 4 in) | 76 kg (168 lb) | 298 cm (9 ft 9 in) | 288 cm (9 ft 5 in) |
| 12 | Michelle Nogueras | 5 December 1988 | 179 cm (5 ft 10 in) | 58 kg (128 lb) | 275 cm (9 ft 0 in) | 262 cm (8 ft 7 in) |
| 13 | Remy June Mcbain | 27 August 1991 | 188 cm (6 ft 2 in) | 68 kg (150 lb) | 299 cm (9 ft 10 in) | 289 cm (9 ft 6 in) |
| 14 | Natalia Valentin | 12 September 1989 | 170 cm (5 ft 7 in) | 61 kg (134 lb) | 244 cm (8 ft 0 in) | 240 cm (7 ft 10 in) |
| 15 | Daly Santana | 19 February 1995 | 185 cm (6 ft 1 in) | 65 kg (143 lb) | 300 cm (9 ft 10 in) | 274 cm (9 ft 0 in) |
| 16 | Alexandra Oquendo | 3 February 1984 | 189 cm (6 ft 2 in) | 75 kg (165 lb) | 297 cm (9 ft 9 in) | 284 cm (9 ft 4 in) |
| 17 | Lynda Morales | 20 May 1988 | 188 cm (6 ft 2 in) | 74 kg (163 lb) | 302 cm (9 ft 11 in) | 296 cm (9 ft 9 in) |
| 18 | Jetzabel Del Valle | 19 December 1979 | 185 cm (6 ft 1 in) | 73 kg (161 lb) | 305 cm (10 ft 0 in) | 292 cm (9 ft 7 in) |
| 19 | Amanda Vazquez | 30 March 1984 | 185 cm (6 ft 1 in) | 94 kg (207 lb) | 302 cm (9 ft 11 in) | 297 cm (9 ft 9 in) |
| 20 | Jennifer Quesada | 22 February 1992 | 188 cm (6 ft 2 in) | 71 kg (157 lb) | 299 cm (9 ft 10 in) | 295 cm (9 ft 8 in) |
| 21 | Jennifer Nogueras | 1 August 1991 | 185 cm (6 ft 1 in) | 88 kg (194 lb) | 299 cm (9 ft 10 in) | 292 cm (9 ft 7 in) |
| 22 | Valeria Gonzalez | 15 September 1988 | 188 cm (6 ft 2 in) | 67 kg (148 lb) | 288 cm (9 ft 5 in) | 282 cm (9 ft 3 in) |
| 23 | Pilar Marie Victoria | 11 October 1995 | 182 cm (6 ft 0 in) | 53 kg (117 lb) | 301 cm (9 ft 11 in) | 268 cm (8 ft 10 in) |
| 24 | Diana Reyes | 29 April 1993 | 188 cm (6 ft 2 in) | 86 kg (190 lb) | 290 cm (9 ft 6 in) | 285 cm (9 ft 4 in) |
| 25 | Kanisha Jimenez | 28 November 1995 | 185 cm (6 ft 1 in) | 56 kg (123 lb) | 295 cm (9 ft 8 in) | 291 cm (9 ft 7 in) |

== Serbia ==
The following is the Serbia roster in the 2012 FIVB World Grand Prix.

| # | Name | Date of birth | Height | Weight | Spike | Block |
|---|---|---|---|---|---|---|
| 1 | Ana Lazarevic | 4 July 1991 | 186 cm (6 ft 1 in) | 74 kg (163 lb) | 280 cm (9 ft 2 in) | 268 cm (8 ft 10 in) |
| 2 | Jovana Brakocevic | 5 March 1988 | 196 cm (6 ft 5 in) | 82 kg (181 lb) | 309 cm (10 ft 2 in) | 295 cm (9 ft 8 in) |
| 3 | Ivana Djerisilo | 8 August 1983 | 188 cm (6 ft 2 in) | 68 kg (150 lb) | 277 cm (9 ft 1 in) | 252 cm (8 ft 3 in) |
| 4 | Bojana Zivkovic | 29 March 1988 | 186 cm (6 ft 1 in) | 72 kg (159 lb) | 292 cm (9 ft 7 in) | 284 cm (9 ft 4 in) |
| 5 | Natasa Krsmanovic | 19 June 1985 | 188 cm (6 ft 2 in) | 73 kg (161 lb) | 305 cm (10 ft 0 in) | 285 cm (9 ft 4 in) |
| 6 | Tijana Malesevic | 18 March 1991 | 185 cm (6 ft 1 in) | 78 kg (172 lb) | 300 cm (9 ft 10 in) | 286 cm (9 ft 5 in) |
| 7 | Brizitka Molnar | 28 July 1985 | 182 cm (6 ft 0 in) | 69 kg (152 lb) | 304 cm (10 ft 0 in) | 290 cm (9 ft 6 in) |
| 8 | Ana Antonijevic | 26 August 1987 | 185 cm (6 ft 1 in) | 70 kg (150 lb) | 295 cm (9 ft 8 in) | 283 cm (9 ft 3 in) |
| 9 | Jovana Vesovic | 21 June 1987 | 182 cm (6 ft 0 in) | 68 kg (150 lb) | 283 cm (9 ft 3 in) | 268 cm (8 ft 10 in) |
| 10 | Maja Ognjenovic | 6 August 1984 | 183 cm (6 ft 0 in) | 67 kg (148 lb) | 290 cm (9 ft 6 in) | 270 cm (8 ft 10 in) |
| 11 | Stefana Veljkovic | 9 January 1990 | 190 cm (6 ft 3 in) | 76 kg (168 lb) | 320 cm (10 ft 6 in) | 305 cm (10 ft 0 in) |
| 12 | Jelena Nikolic | 13 April 1982 | 194 cm (6 ft 4 in) | 79 kg (174 lb) | 315 cm (10 ft 4 in) | 300 cm (9 ft 10 in) |
| 13 | Ana Bjelica | 3 April 1992 | 190 cm (6 ft 3 in) | 78 kg (172 lb) | 310 cm (10 ft 2 in) | 305 cm (10 ft 0 in) |
| 14 | Nadja Ninkovic | 1 November 1991 | 192 cm (6 ft 4 in) | 77 kg (170 lb) | 307 cm (10 ft 1 in) | 298 cm (9 ft 9 in) |
| 15 | Jovana Stevanovic | 30 June 1992 | 192 cm (6 ft 4 in) | 72 kg (159 lb) | 308 cm (10 ft 1 in) | 295 cm (9 ft 8 in) |
| 16 | Milena Rasic | 25 October 1990 | 191 cm (6 ft 3 in) | 72 kg (159 lb) | 303 cm (9 ft 11 in) | 293 cm (9 ft 7 in) |
| 17 | Silvija Popovic | 15 March 1986 | 178 cm (5 ft 10 in) | 65 kg (143 lb) | 276 cm (9 ft 1 in) | 266 cm (8 ft 9 in) |
| 18 | Suzana Cebic | 9 November 1984 | 167 cm (5 ft 6 in) | 60 kg (130 lb) | 279 cm (9 ft 2 in) | 255 cm (8 ft 4 in) |
| 19 | Sanja Starovic | 25 March 1983 | 194 cm (6 ft 4 in) | 96 kg (212 lb) | 315 cm (10 ft 4 in) | 305 cm (10 ft 0 in) |
| 20 | Jelena Blagojevic | 1 December 1988 | 181 cm (5 ft 11 in) | 68 kg (150 lb) | 267 cm (8 ft 9 in) | 242 cm (7 ft 11 in) |
| 22 | Brankica Mihajlovic | 13 April 1991 | 190 cm (6 ft 3 in) | 83 kg (183 lb) | 282 cm (9 ft 3 in) | 264 cm (8 ft 8 in) |

== Thailand ==
The following is the Thailand roster in the 2012 FIVB World Grand Prix.

| # | Name | Date of birth | Height | Weight | Spike | Block |
|---|---|---|---|---|---|---|
| 1 | Wanna Buakaew | 2 January 1981 | 172 cm (5 ft 8 in) | 54 kg (119 lb) | 292 cm (9 ft 7 in) | 277 cm (9 ft 1 in) |
| 2 | Piyanut Pannoy | 10 November 1989 | 171 cm (5 ft 7 in) | 68 kg (150 lb) | 280 cm (9 ft 2 in) | 275 cm (9 ft 0 in) |
| 3 | Surasawadee Boonyuen | 31 October 1991 | 179 cm (5 ft 10 in) | 72 kg (159 lb) | 280 cm (9 ft 2 in) | 275 cm (9 ft 0 in) |
| 4 | Hattaya Bamrungsuk | 12 August 1993 | 178 cm (5 ft 10 in) | 62 kg (137 lb) | 289 cm (9 ft 6 in) | 275 cm (9 ft 0 in) |
| 5 | Pleumjit Thinkaow | 9 November 1983 | 180 cm (5 ft 11 in) | 63 kg (139 lb) | 298 cm (9 ft 9 in) | 281 cm (9 ft 3 in) |
| 6 | Onuma Sittirak | 13 June 1986 | 175 cm (5 ft 9 in) | 72 kg (159 lb) | 304 cm (10 ft 0 in) | 285 cm (9 ft 4 in) |
| 7 | Pornpimol Kunbang | 18 June 1993 | 178 cm (5 ft 10 in) | 70 kg (150 lb) | 268 cm (8 ft 10 in) | 260 cm (8 ft 6 in) |
| 8 | Utaiwan Kaensing | 7 September 1988 | 189 cm (6 ft 2 in) | 86 kg (190 lb) | 310 cm (10 ft 2 in) | 295 cm (9 ft 8 in) |
| 9 | Piyamas Koijapo | 23 October 1978 | 178 cm (5 ft 10 in) | 67 kg (148 lb) | 298 cm (9 ft 9 in) | 282 cm (9 ft 3 in) |
| 10 | Wilavan Apinyapong | 6 June 1984 | 174 cm (5 ft 9 in) | 68 kg (150 lb) | 294 cm (9 ft 8 in) | 282 cm (9 ft 3 in) |
| 11 | Amporn Hyapha | 19 May 1985 | 180 cm (5 ft 11 in) | 70 kg (150 lb) | 301 cm (9 ft 11 in) | 290 cm (9 ft 6 in) |
| 12 | Tapaphaipun Chaisri | 29 November 1989 | 168 cm (5 ft 6 in) | 60 kg (130 lb) | 295 cm (9 ft 8 in) | 276 cm (9 ft 1 in) |
| 13 | Nootsara Tomkom | 7 July 1985 | 169 cm (5 ft 7 in) | 57 kg (126 lb) | 289 cm (9 ft 6 in) | 278 cm (9 ft 1 in) |
| 14 | Jarasporn Bundasak | 1 March 1993 | 180 cm (5 ft 11 in) | 66 kg (146 lb) | 280 cm (9 ft 2 in) | 290 cm (9 ft 6 in) |
| 15 | Malika Kanthong | 8 January 1987 | 177 cm (5 ft 10 in) | 63 kg (139 lb) | 292 cm (9 ft 7 in) | 278 cm (9 ft 1 in) |
| 16 | Pornpun Guedpard | 5 May 1993 | 170 cm (5 ft 7 in) | 63 kg (139 lb) | 270 cm (8 ft 10 in) | 267 cm (8 ft 9 in) |
| 17 | Kamonporn Sukmak | 29 February 1988 | 174 cm (5 ft 9 in) | 63 kg (139 lb) | 285 cm (9 ft 4 in) | 275 cm (9 ft 0 in) |
| 18 | Ajcharaporn Kongyot | 18 June 1995 | 180 cm (5 ft 11 in) | 66 kg (146 lb) | 290 cm (9 ft 6 in) | 284 cm (9 ft 4 in) |
| 19 | Sontaya Keawbundit | 9 February 1991 | 177 cm (5 ft 10 in) | 68 kg (150 lb) | 290 cm (9 ft 6 in) | 280 cm (9 ft 2 in) |
| 20 | Rasamee Supamool | 10 January 1992 | 178 cm (5 ft 10 in) | 68 kg (150 lb) | 285 cm (9 ft 4 in) | 276 cm (9 ft 1 in) |
| 21 | Tanaporn Polrueng | 4 February 1994 | 173 cm (5 ft 8 in) | 68 kg (150 lb) | 276 cm (9 ft 1 in) | 275 cm (9 ft 0 in) |
| 22 | Kaewkalaya Kamulthala | 7 August 1994 | 178 cm (5 ft 10 in) | 72 kg (159 lb) | 279 cm (9 ft 2 in) | 273 cm (8 ft 11 in) |
| 23 | Chutikarn Pholchai | 6 May 1994 | 173 cm (5 ft 8 in) | 56 kg (123 lb) | 274 cm (9 ft 0 in) | 267 cm (8 ft 9 in) |
| 24 | Yupa Sanitklang | 14 August 1991 | 160 cm (5 ft 3 in) | 60 kg (130 lb) | 280 cm (9 ft 2 in) | 270 cm (8 ft 10 in) |
| 25 | Em-orn Phanusit | 25 March 1988 | 179 cm (5 ft 10 in) | 70 kg (150 lb) | 302 cm (9 ft 11 in) | 291 cm (9 ft 7 in) |

== Turkey ==
The following is the Turkey roster in the 2012 FIVB World Grand Prix.

| # | Name | Date of birth | Height | Weight | Spike | Block |
|---|---|---|---|---|---|---|
| 1 | Güldeniz Önal Pasaoglu | 25 March 1986 | 182 cm (6 ft 0 in) | 75 kg (165 lb) | 296 cm (9 ft 9 in) | 290 cm (9 ft 6 in) |
| 2 | Gülden Kayalar Kuzubasioglu | 5 December 1980 | 167 cm (5 ft 6 in) | 57 kg (126 lb) | 281 cm (9 ft 3 in) | 275 cm (9 ft 0 in) |
| 3 | Gizem Guresen | 14 January 1987 | 178 cm (5 ft 10 in) | 70 kg (150 lb) | 250 cm (8 ft 2 in) | 270 cm (8 ft 10 in) |
| 4 | Nihan Yeldan Guneyligil | 7 February 1982 | 170 cm (5 ft 7 in) | 60 kg (130 lb) | 280 cm (9 ft 2 in) | 276 cm (9 ft 1 in) |
| 5 | Ergul Avci | 24 July 1987 | 190 cm (6 ft 3 in) | 75 kg (165 lb) | 300 cm (9 ft 10 in) | 285 cm (9 ft 4 in) |
| 6 | Polen Uslupehlivan | 27 August 1990 | 193 cm (6 ft 4 in) | 65 kg (143 lb) | 305 cm (10 ft 0 in) | 298 cm (9 ft 9 in) |
| 7 | Ayse Gokcen Denkel Zop | 2 August 1985 | 193 cm (6 ft 4 in) | 80 kg (180 lb) | 320 cm (10 ft 6 in) | 315 cm (10 ft 4 in) |
| 8 | Bahar Toksoy | 6 February 1988 | 190 cm (6 ft 3 in) | 68 kg (150 lb) | 315 cm (10 ft 4 in) | 305 cm (10 ft 0 in) |
| 9 | Ozge Yurtdagulen | 6 August 1993 | 193 cm (6 ft 4 in) | 67 kg (148 lb) | 290 cm (9 ft 6 in) | 285 cm (9 ft 4 in) |
| 10 | Gozde Kirdar Sonsirma | 26 June 1985 | 183 cm (6 ft 0 in) | 70 kg (150 lb) | 297 cm (9 ft 9 in) | 292 cm (9 ft 7 in) |
| 11 | Naz Aydemir | 14 August 1990 | 186 cm (6 ft 1 in) | 68 kg (150 lb) | 304 cm (10 ft 0 in) | 300 cm (9 ft 10 in) |
| 12 | Esra Gümüs | 2 October 1982 | 181 cm (5 ft 11 in) | 76 kg (168 lb) | 305 cm (10 ft 0 in) | 297 cm (9 ft 9 in) |
| 13 | Neriman Ozsoy | 13 July 1988 | 188 cm (6 ft 2 in) | 76 kg (168 lb) | 310 cm (10 ft 2 in) | 291 cm (9 ft 7 in) |
| 14 | Eda Erdem Dündar | 22 June 1987 | 188 cm (6 ft 2 in) | 73 kg (161 lb) | 311 cm (10 ft 2 in) | 305 cm (10 ft 0 in) |
| 15 | Meryem Calik | 3 February 1988 | 194 cm (6 ft 4 in) | 63 kg (139 lb) | 315 cm (10 ft 4 in) | 305 cm (10 ft 0 in) |
| 16 | Nedime Elif Oner | 10 February 1984 | 186 cm (6 ft 1 in) | 72 kg (159 lb) | 292 cm (9 ft 7 in) | 290 cm (9 ft 6 in) |
| 17 | Neslihan Darnel | 9 December 1983 | 187 cm (6 ft 2 in) | 72 kg (159 lb) | 315 cm (10 ft 4 in) | 306 cm (10 ft 0 in) |
| 18 | Asuman Karakoyun | 16 July 1990 | 180 cm (5 ft 11 in) | 72 kg (159 lb) | 293 cm (9 ft 7 in) | 289 cm (9 ft 6 in) |
| 19 | Seda Tokatlioglu | 25 June 1986 | 192 cm (6 ft 4 in) | 80 kg (180 lb) | 312 cm (10 ft 3 in) | 304 cm (10 ft 0 in) |
| 20 | Büsra Cansu | 16 July 1990 | 188 cm (6 ft 2 in) | 84 kg (185 lb) | 297 cm (9 ft 9 in) | 291 cm (9 ft 7 in) |
| 21 | Nilay Ozdemir | 24 October 1985 | 179 cm (5 ft 10 in) | 67 kg (148 lb) | 286 cm (9 ft 5 in) | 280 cm (9 ft 2 in) |
| 22 | Yeliz Askan Basa | 13 August 1987 | 187 cm (6 ft 2 in) | 75 kg (165 lb) | 308 cm (10 ft 1 in) | 302 cm (9 ft 11 in) |
| 23 | Selime Ilyasoglu | 18 November 1988 | 183 cm (6 ft 0 in) | 68 kg (150 lb) | 310 cm (10 ft 2 in) | 300 cm (9 ft 10 in) |
| 24 | Hatice Gizem Orge | 26 April 1993 | 170 cm (5 ft 7 in) | 59 kg (130 lb) | 270 cm (8 ft 10 in) | 260 cm (8 ft 6 in) |
| 25 | Ezgi Dagdelenler | 3 November 1993 | 184 cm (6 ft 0 in) | 69 kg (152 lb) | 290 cm (9 ft 6 in) | 269 cm (8 ft 10 in) |

== United States ==
The following is the United States roster in the 2012 FIVB World Grand Prix.

| # | Name | Date of birth | Height | Weight | Spike | Block |
|---|---|---|---|---|---|---|
| 1 | Alisha Glass | 5 April 1988 | 184 cm (6 ft 0 in) | 72 kg (159 lb) | 305 cm (10 ft 0 in) | 300 cm (9 ft 10 in) |
| 2 | Danielle Scott-Arruda | 1 October 1972 | 188 cm (6 ft 2 in) | 84 kg (185 lb) | 325 cm (10 ft 8 in) | 302 cm (9 ft 11 in) |
| 3 | Tayyiba Haneef-Park | 23 March 1979 | 201 cm (6 ft 7 in) | 82 kg (181 lb) | 328 cm (10 ft 9 in) | 312 cm (10 ft 3 in) |
| 4 | Lindsey Berg | 16 July 1980 | 173 cm (5 ft 8 in) | 75 kg (165 lb) | 287 cm (9 ft 5 in) | 274 cm (9 ft 0 in) |
| 5 | Stacy Sykora | 24 June 1977 | 176 cm (5 ft 9 in) | 61 kg (134 lb) | 305 cm (10 ft 0 in) | 295 cm (9 ft 8 in) |
| 6 | Nicole Davis | 24 April 1982 | 167 cm (5 ft 6 in) | 73 kg (161 lb) | 284 cm (9 ft 4 in) | 266 cm (8 ft 9 in) |
| 7 | Heather Bown | 29 November 1978 | 188 cm (6 ft 2 in) | 90 kg (200 lb) | 301 cm (9 ft 11 in) | 290 cm (9 ft 6 in) |
| 8 | Cynthia Barboza | 7 February 1987 | 183 cm (6 ft 0 in) | 68 kg (150 lb) | 311 cm (10 ft 2 in) | 301 cm (9 ft 11 in) |
| 9 | Jennifer Tamas | 23 November 1982 | 191 cm (6 ft 3 in) | 82 kg (181 lb) | 315 cm (10 ft 4 in) | 301 cm (9 ft 11 in) |
| 10 | Kimberly Glass | 18 August 1984 | 191 cm (6 ft 3 in) | 75 kg (165 lb) | 314 cm (10 ft 4 in) | 299 cm (9 ft 10 in) |
| 11 | Jordan Larson-Burbach | 16 October 1986 | 190 cm (6 ft 3 in) | 75 kg (165 lb) | 302 cm (9 ft 11 in) | 295 cm (9 ft 8 in) |
| 12 | Nancy Metcalf | 12 November 1978 | 188 cm (6 ft 2 in) | 73 kg (161 lb) | 314 cm (10 ft 4 in) | 292 cm (9 ft 7 in) |
| 13 | Christa Harmotto Dietzen | 12 October 1986 | 188 cm (6 ft 2 in) | 79 kg (174 lb) | 322 cm (10 ft 7 in) | 300 cm (9 ft 10 in) |
| 14 | Nicole Fawcett | 16 December 1986 | 196 cm (6 ft 5 in) | 82 kg (181 lb) | 310 cm (10 ft 2 in) | 291 cm (9 ft 7 in) |
| 15 | Logan Tom | 25 May 1981 | 186 cm (6 ft 1 in) | 80 kg (180 lb) | 306 cm (10 ft 0 in) | 297 cm (9 ft 9 in) |
| 16 | Foluke Akinradewo | 5 October 1987 | 191 cm (6 ft 3 in) | 79 kg (174 lb) | 331 cm (10 ft 10 in) | 300 cm (9 ft 10 in) |
| 17 | Carli Lloyd | 6 August 1989 | 180 cm (5 ft 11 in) | 75 kg (165 lb) | 313 cm (10 ft 3 in) | 295 cm (9 ft 8 in) |
| 18 | Megan Easy | 15 October 1988 | 191 cm (6 ft 3 in) | 80 kg (180 lb) | 320 cm (10 ft 6 in) | 297 cm (9 ft 9 in) |
| 19 | Destinee Hooker | 7 September 1987 | 196 cm (6 ft 5 in) | 73 kg (161 lb) | 320 cm (10 ft 6 in) | 304 cm (10 ft 0 in) |
| 20 | Alexandra Klineman | 30 December 1989 | 194 cm (6 ft 4 in) | 73 kg (161 lb) | 322 cm (10 ft 7 in) | 299 cm (9 ft 10 in) |
| 21 | Tamari Miyashiro | 8 July 1987 | 170 cm (5 ft 7 in) | 70 kg (150 lb) | 284 cm (9 ft 4 in) | 266 cm (8 ft 9 in) |
| 22 | Courtney Thompson | 4 November 1984 | 173 cm (5 ft 8 in) | 66 kg (146 lb) | 276 cm (9 ft 1 in) | 263 cm (8 ft 8 in) |
| 23 | Mary Spicer | 3 July 1987 | 175 cm (5 ft 9 in) | 65 kg (143 lb) | 292 cm (9 ft 7 in) | 280 cm (9 ft 2 in) |
| 24 | Kristin Lynn Hildebrand | 30 June 1985 | 185 cm (6 ft 1 in) | 68 kg (150 lb) | 300 cm (9 ft 10 in) | 284 cm (9 ft 4 in) |
| 25 | Lauren Gibbemeyer | 8 September 1988 | 187 cm (6 ft 2 in) | 71 kg (157 lb) | 307 cm (10 ft 1 in) | 293 cm (9 ft 7 in) |
