= 2016 FIVB Volleyball World Grand Prix =

2016 World Grand Prix

Tournament details
- Host country: Thailand
- City: Bangkok (Group 1 Final)
- Dates: 3 June – 10 July
- Teams: 28 (from 5 confederations)
- Venues: 20 (in 20 host cities)

Final positions
- Champions: Brazil (11th title)
- Runners-up: United States
- Third place: Netherlands
- Fourth place: Russia

Tournament awards
- MVP: (Brazil) Natália Pereira
- Best Setter: (Thailand) Nootsara Tomkom
- Best OH: (Brazil) Sheilla Castro (United States) Kimberly Hill
- Best MB: (United States) Rachael Adams (Brazil) Thaísa Menezes
- Best OPP: (Netherlands) Lonneke Slöetjes
- Best Libero: (China) Lin Li

Tournament statistics
- Matches played: 121
- Best scorer: (Russia) Nataliya Goncharova (185 points)
- Best spiker: (Italy) Paola Egonu (46.05%)
- Best blocker: (Russia) Irina Zaryazhko (1.22)
- Best server: (Thailand) Ajcharaporn Kongyot (0.45)
- Best setter: (Japan) Kanami Tashiro (4.86)
- Best digger: (Russia) Anna Malova (3.08)
- Best receiver: (Thailand) Wilavan Apinyapong (53.85%)

The 2016 FIVB Volleyball World Grand Prix was the 24th edition of the annual women's international volleyball tournament played by 28 teams from 3 June to 10 July 2016. The Group 1 final round was held in Bangkok, Thailand. Brazil captured their record eleventh title in the tournament after a 3–2 win over defending champions United States. In the bronze medal match, The Netherlands prevailed in five sets over Russia. Natália Pereira was elected the most valuable player.

In the Group 2 finals held in Varna, Bulgaria, Dominican Republic defeated Poland in five sets and earned a promotion to Group 1 for the 2017 season.

Moreover, in the Group 3 finals in Almaty, Kazakhstan, Croatia defeated the home team in straight sets to earn a promotion to Group 2 in the 2017 edition.

== Qualification ==
- All 28 teams of the 2015 edition directly qualified.

| Africa | Asia and Oceania | Europe | North America | South America |
|---|---|---|---|---|
| Algeria; Kenya | Australia; China; Japan; Kazakhstan; Thailand | Belgium; Bulgaria; Croatia; Czech Republic; Germany; Italy Netherlands; Poland; Russia; Serbia; Turkey | Canada; Cuba; Dominican Republic; Mexico; Puerto Rico; United States | Argentina; Brazil; Colombia; Peru |

== Format ==
=== Intercontinental round ===
- Group 1, the 12 teams were drawn in 9 pools of 4 teams. In each pool, all teams will compete in round robin format. The results of all 9 pools will combine in 1 ranking table. The hosts and the top five ranked teams will play in the final round. The last ranked team after the Intercontinental Round could be relegated if the winners of the Group 2 Final Round can meet the promotion requirements set by the FIVB.
- Group 2, the 8 teams were drawn in 4 pools of 4 teams. In each pool, all teams will compete in round robin format. The results of all 4 pools will combine in 1 ranking table. The hosts and the top three ranked teams will play in the final round. The last ranked team after the Intercontinental Round could be relegated if the winners of the Group 3 Final Round can meet the promotion requirements set by the FIVB.
- Group 3, the 8 teams were drawn in 4 pools of 4 teams. In each pool, all teams will compete in round robin format. The results of all 4 pools will combine in 1 ranking table. The hosts and the top three ranked teams will play in the final round.

=== Final round ===
- Group 1, the 6 teams in the final round will be divided in 2 pools determined by the serpentine system. The host team will be at the top position and the other teams will be allocated by their rankings in the preliminary round. The top 2 teams from each pool will play in the semifinals. The winning teams will play in the final match for the gold medals.
- Group 2 and Group 3, the host team will face the last ranked team among the qualified teams in the semifinals. The other 2 teams will play against each other in the other semifinal. The winning teams will play in the final match for the gold medals and a chance for promotion.

== Pools composition ==
The pools composition was announced on 19 August 2015.

| Group 1 | | | Group 2 | | Group 3 | |
| Week 2 | | | Week 1 | | | |
| Pool A1 China | Pool B1 Brazil | Pool C1 Russia | Pool A2 Argentina | Pool B2 Poland | Pool A3 Algeria | Pool B3 Australia |
|---|---|---|---|---|---|---|
| United States; Thailand; Germany; China | Brazil; Italy; Japan; Serbia | Russia; Netherlands; Turkey; Belgium | Argentina; Bulgaria; Dominican Republic; Kenya | Canada; Czech Republic; Poland; Puerto Rico | Mexico; Peru; Kazakhstan; Algeria | Croatia; Colombia; Australia; Cuba |
| Week 3 | | | Week 2 | | | |
| Pool D1 Macau | Pool E1 United States | Pool F1 Italy | Pool C2 Czech Republic | Pool D2 Poland | Pool C3 Colombia | Pool D3 Peru |
| Brazil; Belgium; Serbia; China | United States; Germany; Japan; Turkey | Russia; Netherlands; Italy; Thailand | Bulgaria; Canada; Czech Republic; Dominican Republic | Argentina; Kenya; Poland; Puerto Rico | Australia; Colombia; Kazakhstan; Mexico | Croatia; Peru; Cuba; Algeria |
| Week 4 | | | Final round | | | |
| Pool G1 Turkey | Pool H1 Hong Kong | Pool I1 Japan | Group 3 (Week 3) Kazakhstan | Group 2 (Week 3) Bulgaria | Group 1 (Week 6) Thailand | |
| Brazil; Italy; Turkey; Belgium | United States; Netherlands; Germany; China | Russia; Thailand; Japan; Serbia | Kazakhstan; Peru; Croatia; Colombia | Bulgaria; Puerto Rico; Dominican Republic; Poland | Pool J1; Thailand; Russia; Brazil Pool K1; United States; China; Netherlands | |

== Competition schedule ==
| ● | Intercontinental round | ● | Final round |

| | Week 1 3–5 Jun | Week 2 9–12 Jun | Week 3 17–19 Jun | Week 4 24–26 Jun | Week 5 1–3 Jul | Week 6 6–10 Jul |
|---|---|---|---|---|---|---|
| Group 1 | | 18 matches | 18 matches | 18 matches | | 11 matches |
| Group 2 | 12 matches | 12 matches | 4 matches | | | |
| Group 3 | 12 matches | 12 matches | 4 matches | | | |

== Squads ==
There are 21 players in team rosters. Maximum of 12 regular players and maximum of 2 liberos can be selected to play in each week. The full rosters of 21 players of each team can be seen in the article below.

== Pool standing procedure ==
1. Number of matches won
2. Match points
3. Sets ratio
4. Points ratio
5. If the tie continues as per the point ratio between two teams, the priority will be given to the team which won the last match between them. When the tie in points ratio is between three or more teams, a new classification of these teams in the terms of points 1, 2 and 3 will be made taking into consideration only the matches in which they were opposed to each other.

Match won 3–0 or 3–1: 3 match points for the winner, 0 match points for the loser
Match won 3–2: 2 match points for the winner, 1 match point for the loser

== Intercontinental round ==
- All times are Greenwich Mean Time (UTC±00:00).

=== Group 1 ===
==== Ranking ====
| Pos | Team | Pld | W | L | Pts | SW | SL | SR | SPW | SPL | SPR | Qualification or relegation |
|---|---|---|---|---|---|---|---|---|---|---|---|---|
| 1 | United States | 9 | 8 | 1 | 24 | 25 | 5 | 5.000 | 739 | 603 | 1.226 | Qualified for the Group 1 final round |
| 2 | China | 9 | 8 | 1 | 23 | 24 | 6 | 4.000 | 701 | 591 | 1.186 | Qualified for the Group 1 final round |
| 3 | Russia | 9 | 8 | 1 | 23 | 26 | 10 | 2.600 | 833 | 738 | 1.129 | Qualified for the Group 1 final round |
| 4 | Brazil | 9 | 7 | 2 | 22 | 23 | 10 | 2.300 | 779 | 674 | 1.156 | Qualified for the Group 1 final round |
| 5 | Netherlands | 9 | 5 | 4 | 15 | 17 | 14 | 1.214 | 709 | 706 | 1.004 | Qualified for the Group 1 final round |
| 6 | Serbia | 9 | 5 | 4 | 12 | 18 | 20 | 0.900 | 836 | 854 | 0.979 | |
| 7 | Italy | 9 | 4 | 5 | 13 | 19 | 19 | 1.000 | 840 | 818 | 1.027 | |
| 8 | Japan | 9 | 3 | 6 | 12 | 16 | 19 | 0.842 | 776 | 783 | 0.991 | |
| 9 | Turkey | 9 | 3 | 6 | 9 | 13 | 21 | 0.619 | 719 | 773 | 0.930 | |
| 10 | Thailand | 9 | 2 | 7 | 5 | 7 | 24 | 0.292 | 611 | 744 | 0.821 | Qualified as hosts for the Group 1 final round |
| 11 | Belgium | 9 | 1 | 8 | 4 | 8 | 25 | 0.320 | 668 | 771 | 0.866 | |
| 12 | Germany | 9 | 0 | 9 | 0 | 4 | 27 | 0.148 | 610 | 766 | 0.796 | Relegated position |

==== Week 2 ====
===== Pool A1 =====
- Venue: Beilun Gymnasium, Ningbo, China

| Date | Time | | Score | | Set 1 | Set 2 | Set 3 | Set 4 | Set 5 | Total | Report |
|---|---|---|---|---|---|---|---|---|---|---|---|
| 10 Jun | 07:00 | Germany | 0–3 | United States | 15–25 | 17–25 | 12–25 | | | 44–75 | P2 P3 |
| 10 Jun | 11:30 | China | 3–0 | Thailand | 25–14 | 25–14 | 25–11 | | | 75–39 | P2 P3 |
| 11 Jun | 07:00 | United States | 3–0 | Thailand | 25–21 | 29–27 | 25–23 | | | 79–71 | P2 P3 |
| 11 Jun | 11:30 | China | 3–0 | Germany | 25–12 | 25–22 | 25–16 | | | 75–50 | P2 P3 |
| 12 Jun | 07:00 | Thailand | 3–1 | Germany | 16–25 | 28–26 | 25–22 | 25–16 | | 94–89 | P2 P3 |
| 12 Jun | 11:30 | China | 3–1 | United States | 25–20 | 25–19 | 15–25 | 25–23 | | 90–87 | P2 P3 |

===== Pool B1 =====
- Venue: Carioca Arena 1, Rio de Janeiro, Brazil

| Date | Time | | Score | | Set 1 | Set 2 | Set 3 | Set 4 | Set 5 | Total | Report |
|---|---|---|---|---|---|---|---|---|---|---|---|
| 9 Jun | 17:45 | Brazil | 3–1 | Italy | 23–25 | 25–15 | 25–15 | 27–25 | | 100–80 | P2 P3 |
| 9 Jun | 20:15 | Japan | 3–0 | Serbia | 31–29 | 25–18 | 28–26 | | | 84–73 | P2 P3 |
| 10 Jun | 17:45 | Brazil | 3–0 | Japan | 25–20 | 25–23 | 25–15 | | | 75–58 | P2 P3 |
| 10 Jun | 20:15 | Italy | 3–1 | Serbia | 25–16 | 25–19 | 29–31 | 25–17 | | 104–83 | P2 P3 |
| 12 Jun | 13:05 | Brazil | 3–0 | Serbia | 25–20 | 25–18 | 25–18 | | | 75–56 | P2 P3 |
| 12 Jun | 15:30 | Italy | 3–2 | Japan | 25–20 | 25–20 | 23–25 | 25–27 | 15–8 | 113–100 | P2 P3 |

===== Pool C1 =====
- Venue: DS Yantarny, Kaliningrad, Russia

| Date | Time | | Score | | Set 1 | Set 2 | Set 3 | Set 4 | Set 5 | Total | Report |
|---|---|---|---|---|---|---|---|---|---|---|---|
| 10 Jun | 14:40 | Turkey | 3–0 | Belgium | 25–22 | 25–23 | 26–24 | | | 76–69 | P2 P3 |
| 10 Jun | 17:10 | Russia | 3–1 | Netherlands | 25–22 | 20–25 | 25–20 | 25–16 | | 95–83 | P2 P3 |
| 11 Jun | 14:40 | Turkey | 0–3 | Netherlands | 25–27 | 21–25 | 22–25 | | | 68–77 | P2 P3 |
| 11 Jun | 17:10 | Russia | 3–0 | Belgium | 25–20 | 25–15 | 25–16 | | | 75–51 | P2 P3 |
| 12 Jun | 14:40 | Netherlands | 3–1 | Belgium | 25–20 | 25–21 | 18–25 | 25–20 | | 93–86 | P2 P3 |
| 12 Jun | 17:10 | Russia | 3–2 | Turkey | 26–24 | 20–25 | 20–25 | 25–20 | 15–10 | 106–104 | P2 P3 |

==== Week 3 ====
===== Pool D1 =====
- Venue: Macau Forum, Macau, China

| Date | Time | | Score | | Set 1 | Set 2 | Set 3 | Set 4 | Set 5 | Total | Report |
|---|---|---|---|---|---|---|---|---|---|---|---|
| 17 Jun | 08:00 | Brazil | 2–3 | Serbia | 25–16 | 31–29 | 19–25 | 19–25 | 16–18 | 110–113 | P2 P3 |
| 17 Jun | 12:00 | China | 3–0 | Belgium | 25–19 | 25–17 | 25–22 | | | 75–58 | P2 P3 |
| 18 Jun | 06:30 | Brazil | 3–1 | Belgium | 23–25 | 25–19 | 25–15 | 25–18 | | 98–77 | P2 P3 |
| 18 Jun | 09:00 | China | 3–2 | Serbia | 27–25 | 17–25 | 20–25 | 25–22 | 15–9 | 104–106 | P2 P3 |
| 19 Jun | 05:00 | Belgium | 2–3 | Serbia | 26–24 | 24–26 | 23–25 | 25–23 | 10–15 | 108–113 | P2 P3 |
| 19 Jun | 07:30 | China | 3–0 | Brazil | 25–23 | 25–16 | 25–20 | | | 75–59 | P2 P3 |

===== Pool E1 =====
- Venue: Walter Pyramid, Long Beach, United States

| Date | Time | | Score | | Set 1 | Set 2 | Set 3 | Set 4 | Set 5 | Total | Report |
|---|---|---|---|---|---|---|---|---|---|---|---|
| 17 Jun | 00:10 | Turkey | 3–2 | Japan | 21–25 | 25–16 | 23–25 | 25–21 | 15–13 | 109–100 | P2 P3 |
| 17 Jun | 02:10 | United States | 3–1 | Germany | 25–17 | 24–26 | 25–10 | 25–23 | | 99–76 | P2 P3 |
| 18 Jun | 00:10 | Turkey | 3–1 | Germany | 25–18 | 16–25 | 25–19 | 25–19 | | 91–81 | P2 P3 |
| 18 Jun | 02:10 | United States | 3–0 | Japan | 25–16 | 25–23 | 25–21 | | | 75–60 | P2 P3 |
| 19 Jun | 22:10 | Japan | 3–1 | Germany | 25–27 | 26–24 | 25–15 | 25–18 | | 101–84 | P2 P3 |
| 19 Jun | 00:10 | United States | 3–0 | Turkey | 25–21 | 25–20 | 25–16 | | | 75–57 | P2 P3 |

===== Pool F1 =====
- Venue: PalaFlorio, Bari, Italy

| Date | Time | | Score | | Set 1 | Set 2 | Set 3 | Set 4 | Set 5 | Total | Report |
|---|---|---|---|---|---|---|---|---|---|---|---|
| 17 Jun | 15:30 | Russia | 3–0 | Netherlands | 25–17 | 25–23 | 28–26 | | | 78–66 | P2 P3 |
| 18 Jun | 15:30 | Thailand | 0–3 | Russia | 22–25 | 22–25 | 13–25 | | | 57–75 | P2 P3 |
| 18 Jun | 18:30 | Netherlands | 3–1 | Italy | 19–25 | 25–23 | 25–18 | 25–22 | | 94–88 | P2 P3 |
| 19 Jun | 15:30 | Netherlands | 3–0 | Thailand | 25–19 | 25–16 | 25–21 | | | 75–56 | P2 P3 |
| 19 Jun | 18:30 | Russia | 3–2 | Italy | 19–25 | 25–15 | 25–22 | 22–25 | 15–10 | 106–97 | P2 P3 |
| 20 Jun (Note: The match, originally scheduled for 17 June at 18:30, was interrupted in the second set due to power outage. Italy was leading 25–10, 16–15. Play was suspended and the match was rescheduled after agreement of both teams.) | 07:10 | Thailand | 3–2 | Italy | 25–20 | 23–25 | 25–23 | 19–25 | 15–11 | 107–104 | P2 P3 |

==== Week 4 ====
===== Pool G1 =====
- Venue: Başkent Volleyball Hall, Ankara, Turkey

| Date | Time | | Score | | Set 1 | Set 2 | Set 3 | Set 4 | Set 5 | Total | Report |
|---|---|---|---|---|---|---|---|---|---|---|---|
| 24 Jun | 11:30 | Italy | 1–3 | Brazil | 26–24 | 22–25 | 13–25 | 22–25 | | 83–99 | P2 P3 |
| 24 Jun | 14:30 | Turkey | 1–3 | Belgium | 18–25 | 14–25 | 25–19 | 21–25 | | 78–94 | P2 P3 |
| 25 Jun | 11:30 | Brazil | 3–1 | Belgium | 13–25 | 25–19 | 25–16 | 25–18 | | 88–78 | P2 P3 |
| 25 Jun | 14:30 | Turkey | 1–3 | Italy | 25–21 | 21–25 | 19–25 | 17–25 | | 82–96 | P2 P3 |
| 26 Jun | 11:30 | Italy | 3–0 | Belgium | 25–14 | 25–12 | 25–21 | | | 75–47 | P2 P3 |
| 26 Jun | 14:30 | Turkey | 0–3 | Brazil | 14–25 | 21–25 | 19–25 | | | 54–75 | P2 P3 |

===== Pool H1 =====
- Venue: Hong Kong Coliseum, Hong Kong, China

| Date | Time | | Score | | Set 1 | Set 2 | Set 3 | Set 4 | Set 5 | Total | Report |
|---|---|---|---|---|---|---|---|---|---|---|---|
| 24 Jun | 10:30 | Germany | 0–3 | United States | 19–25 | 22–25 | 28–30 | | | 69–80 | P2 P3 |
| 24 Jun | 12:30 | China | 3–0 | Netherlands | 25–22 | 25–23 | 25–21 | | | 75–66 | P2 P3 |
| 25 Jun | 05:15 | United States | 3–1 | Netherlands | 25–17 | 19–25 | 25–17 | 25–20 | | 94–79 | P2 P3 |
| 25 Jun | 07:45 | China | 3–0 | Germany | 25–13 | 25–16 | 25–22 | | | 75–51 | P2 P3 |
| 26 Jun | 05:15 | Netherlands | 3–0 | Germany | 26–24 | 25–20 | 25–22 | | | 76–66 | P2 P3 |
| 26 Jun | 07:45 | China | 0–3 | United States | 19–25 | 21–25 | 17–25 | | | 57–75 | P2 P3 |

===== Pool I1 =====
- Venue: Shimadzu Arena, Kyoto, Japan

| Date | Time | | Score | | Set 1 | Set 2 | Set 3 | Set 4 | Set 5 | Total | Report |
|---|---|---|---|---|---|---|---|---|---|---|---|
| 24 Jun | 07:10 | Serbia | 3–2 | Russia | 23–25 | 25–27 | 25–21 | 25–20 | 15–12 | 113–105 | P2 P3 |
| 24 Jun | 10:10 | Japan | 3–0 | Thailand | 25–20 | 25–19 | 25–15 | | | 75–54 | P2 P3 |
| 25 Jun | 06:10 | Thailand | 1–3 | Russia | 16–25 | 22–25 | 25–22 | 12–25 | | 75–97 | P2 P3 |
| 25 Jun | 09:10 | Japan | 2–3 | Serbia | 23–25 | 25–20 | 25–17 | 25–27 | 8–15 | 106–104 | P2 P3 |
| 26 Jun | 06:10 | Serbia | 3–0 | Thailand | 25–18 | 25–20 | 25–20 | | | 75–58 | P2 P3 |
| 26 Jun | 09:10 | Japan | 1–3 | Russia | 25–20 | 23–25 | 24–26 | 20–25 | | 92–96 | P2 P3 |

=== Group 2 ===
==== Ranking ====
| Pos | Team | Pld | W | L | Pts | SW | SL | SR | SPW | SPL | SPR | Qualification or relegation |
|---|---|---|---|---|---|---|---|---|---|---|---|---|
| 1 | Puerto Rico | 6 | 6 | 0 | 17 | 18 | 4 | 4.500 | 524 | 451 | 1.162 | Qualified for the Group 2 final round |
| 2 | Dominican Republic | 6 | 5 | 1 | 14 | 17 | 7 | 2.429 | 540 | 489 | 1.104 | Qualified for the Group 2 final round |
| 3 | Bulgaria | 6 | 5 | 1 | 13 | 15 | 9 | 1.667 | 554 | 494 | 1.121 | Qualified as hosts for the Group 2 final round |
| 4 | Poland | 6 | 4 | 2 | 12 | 14 | 10 | 1.400 | 565 | 484 | 1.167 | Qualified for the Group 2 final round |
| 5 | Argentina | 6 | 2 | 4 | 8 | 12 | 12 | 1.000 | 524 | 546 | 0.960 | |
| 6 | Czech Republic | 6 | 2 | 4 | 7 | 11 | 12 | 0.917 | 502 | 511 | 0.982 | |
| 7 | Canada | 6 | 0 | 6 | 1 | 3 | 18 | 0.167 | 414 | 516 | 0.802 | |
| 8 | Kenya | 6 | 0 | 6 | 0 | 0 | 18 | 0.000 | 319 | 451 | 0.707 | Relegated position |

==== Week 1 ====
===== Pool A2 =====
- Venue: Club Deportivo Floresta, San Miguel de Tucumán, Argentina

| Date | Time | | Score | | Set 1 | Set 2 | Set 3 | Set 4 | Set 5 | Total | Report |
|---|---|---|---|---|---|---|---|---|---|---|---|
| 3 Jun | 21:10 | Dominican Republic | 2–3 | Bulgaria | 25–23 | 20–25 | 18–25 | 25–17 | 9–15 | 97–105 | P2 P3 |
| 4 Jun | 00:10 | Argentina | 3–0 | Kenya | 25–22 | 25–21 | 25–13 | | | 75–56 | P2 P3 |
| 4 Jun | 21:10 | Kenya | 0–3 | Bulgaria | 17–25 | 17–25 | 9–25 | | | 43–75 | P2 P3 |
| 5 Jun | 00:10 | Argentina | 2–3 | Dominican Republic | 25–22 | 16–25 | 15–25 | 25–23 | 14–16 | 95–111 | P2 P3 |
| 5 Jun | 21:10 | Dominican Republic | 3–0 | Kenya | 25–21 | 25–21 | 25–20 | | | 75–62 | P2 P3 |
| 6 Jun | 00:10 | Argentina | 1–3 | Bulgaria | 25–27 | 17–25 | 27–25 | 19–25 | | 88–102 | P2 P3 |

===== Pool B2 =====
- Venue: Hala MOSiR, Zielona Góra, Poland

| Date | Time | | Score | | Set 1 | Set 2 | Set 3 | Set 4 | Set 5 | Total | Report |
|---|---|---|---|---|---|---|---|---|---|---|---|
| 3 Jun | 15:10 | Czech Republic | 1–3 | Puerto Rico | 25–21 | 20–25 | 21–25 | 19–25 | | 85–96 | P2 P3 |
| 3 Jun | 18:10 | Poland | 3–1 | Canada | 25–19 | 28–30 | 25–15 | 25–20 | | 103–84 | P2 P3 |
| 4 Jun | 15:10 | Puerto Rico | 3–0 | Canada | 25–18 | 25–11 | 25–16 | | | 75–45 | P2 P3 |
| 4 Jun | 18:10 | Poland | 3–1 | Czech Republic | 25–15 | 23–25 | 25–20 | 25–23 | | 98–83 | P2 P3 |
| 5 Jun | 15:10 | Czech Republic | 3–0 | Canada | 25–13 | 25–18 | 25–23 | | | 75–54 | P2 P3 |
| 5 Jun | 18:10 | Poland | 2–3 | Puerto Rico | 25–18 | 23–25 | 25–15 | 26–28 | 13–15 | 112–101 | P2 P3 |

==== Week 2 ====
===== Pool C2 =====
- Venue: Sport Hall Up Olomouc, Olomouc, Czech Republic

| Date | Time | | Score | | Set 1 | Set 2 | Set 3 | Set 4 | Set 5 | Total | Report |
|---|---|---|---|---|---|---|---|---|---|---|---|
| 10 Jun | 13:10 | Bulgaria | 0–3 | Dominican Republic | 16–25 | 24–26 | 23–25 | | | 63–76 | P2 P3 |
| 10 Jun | 16:10 | Czech Republic | 3–0 | Canada | 25–19 | 25–21 | 25–21 | | | 75–61 | P2 P3 |
| 11 Jun | 13:10 | Dominican Republic | 3–0 | Canada | 25–16 | 27–25 | 25–21 | | | 77–62 | P2 P3 |
| 11 Jun | 16:10 | Bulgaria | 3–1 | Czech Republic | 25–22 | 25–16 | 23–25 | 25–19 | | 98–82 | P2 P3 |
| 12 Jun | 13:10 | Canada | 2–3 | Bulgaria | 22–25 | 25–22 | 25–21 | 26–28 | 10–15 | 108–111 | P2 P3 |
| 12 Jun | 16:10 | Czech Republic | 2–3 | Dominican Republic | 22–25 | 25–15 | 21–25 | 26–24 | 8–15 | 102–104 | P2 P3 |

===== Pool D2 =====
- Venue: Hala Mistrzów, Włocławek, Poland

| Date | Time | | Score | | Set 1 | Set 2 | Set 3 | Set 4 | Set 5 | Total | Report |
|---|---|---|---|---|---|---|---|---|---|---|---|
| 10 Jun | 15:10 | Kenya | 0–3 | Puerto Rico | 11–25 | 20–25 | 22–25 | | | 53–75 | P2 P3 |
| 10 Jun | 18:10 | Poland | 3–2 | Argentina | 25–23 | 24–26 | 25–15 | 23–25 | 15–10 | 112–99 | P2 P3 |
| 11 Jun | 15:10 | Puerto Rico | 3–1 | Argentina | 30–28 | 22–25 | 25–16 | 25–22 | | 102–91 | P2 P3 |
| 11 Jun | 18:10 | Poland | 3–0 | Kenya | 25–18 | 25–10 | 25–14 | | | 75–42 | P2 P3 |
| 12 Jun | 13:10 | Poland | 0–3 | Puerto Rico | 21–25 | 21–25 | 23–25 | | | 65–75 | P2 P3 |
| 12 Jun | 16:10 | Argentina | 3–0 | Kenya | 26–24 | 25–22 | 25–17 | | | 76–63 | P2 P3 |

=== Group 3 ===
==== Ranking ====
| Pos | Team | Pld | W | L | Pts | SW | SL | SR | SPW | SPL | SPR | Qualification |
|---|---|---|---|---|---|---|---|---|---|---|---|---|
| 1 | Peru | 6 | 6 | 0 | 17 | 18 | 4 | 4.500 | 521 | 367 | 1.420 | Qualified for the Group 3 final round |
| 2 | Croatia | 6 | 5 | 1 | 15 | 16 | 4 | 4.000 | 477 | 367 | 1.300 | Qualified for the Group 3 final round |
| 3 | Colombia | 6 | 4 | 2 | 12 | 13 | 7 | 1.857 | 464 | 390 | 1.190 | Qualified for the Group 3 final round |
| 4 | Kazakhstan | 6 | 4 | 2 | 12 | 14 | 8 | 1.750 | 510 | 439 | 1.162 | Qualified as hosts for the Group 3 final round |
| 5 | Cuba | 6 | 3 | 3 | 10 | 12 | 11 | 1.091 | 475 | 504 | 0.942 | |
| 6 | Mexico | 6 | 2 | 4 | 6 | 8 | 13 | 0.615 | 435 | 504 | 0.863 | |
| 7 | Australia | 6 | 0 | 6 | 0 | 2 | 18 | 0.111 | 379 | 495 | 0.766 | |
| 8 | Algeria | 6 | 0 | 6 | 0 | 0 | 18 | 0.000 | 255 | 450 | 0.567 | |

==== Week 1 ====
===== Pool A3 =====
- Venue: Salle OMS Belkhdar Tahar, Algiers, Algeria

| Date | Time | | Score | | Set 1 | Set 2 | Set 3 | Set 4 | Set 5 | Total | Report |
|---|---|---|---|---|---|---|---|---|---|---|---|
| 3 Jun | 13:00 | Kazakhstan | 1–3 | Peru | 21–25 | 25–21 | 24–26 | 16–25 | | 86–97 | P2 P3 |
| 3 Jun | 15:00 | Algeria | 0–3 | Mexico | 23–25 | 20–25 | 15–25 | | | 58–75 | P2 P3 |
| 4 Jun | 13:00 | Peru | 3–0 | Mexico | 25–16 | 25–16 | 25–13 | | | 75–45 | P2 P3 |
| 4 Jun | 15:00 | Algeria | 0–3 | Kazakhstan | 17–25 | 13–25 | 5–25 | | | 35–75 | P2 P3 |
| 5 Jun | 13:00 | Kazakhstan | 3–1 | Mexico | 25–16 | 25–20 | 21–25 | 25–23 | | 96–84 | P2 P3 |
| 5 Jun | 15:00 | Algeria | 0–3 | Peru | 12–25 | 13–25 | 12–25 | | | 37–75 | P2 P3 |

===== Pool B3 =====
- Venue: Bendigo Stadium, Bendigo, Australia

| Date | Time | | Score | | Set 1 | Set 2 | Set 3 | Set 4 | Set 5 | Total | Report |
|---|---|---|---|---|---|---|---|---|---|---|---|
| 3 Jun | 07:40 | Croatia | 3–1 | Cuba | 25–17 | 21–25 | 25–17 | 25–18 | | 96–77 | P2 P3 |
| 3 Jun | 10:40 | Australia | 0–3 | Colombia | 17–25 | 13–25 | 13–25 | | | 43–75 | P2 P3 |
| 4 Jun | 06:10 | Colombia | 0–3 | Croatia | 20–25 | 22–25 | 17–25 | | | 59–75 | P2 P3 |
| 4 Jun | 09:10 | Australia | 1–3 | Cuba | 22–25 | 25–27 | 25–18 | 25–27 | | 97–97 | P2 P3 |
| 5 Jun | 03:10 | Cuba | 3–1 | Colombia | 21–25 | 25–20 | 25–17 | 25–21 | | 96–83 | P2 P3 |
| 5 Jun | 06:10 | Australia | 0–3 | Croatia | 19–25 | 17–25 | 12–25 | | | 48–75 | P2 P3 |

==== Week 2 ====
===== Pool C3 =====
- Venue: Coliseo Evangelista Mora, Cali, Colombia

| Date | Time | | Score | | Set 1 | Set 2 | Set 3 | Set 4 | Set 5 | Total | Report |
|---|---|---|---|---|---|---|---|---|---|---|---|
| 10 Jun | 22:00 | Kazakhstan | 3–0 | Australia | 25–14 | 25–6 | 25–20 | | | 75–40 | P2 P3 |
| 11 Jun | 00:30 | Colombia | 3–0 | Mexico | 25–19 | 25–10 | 25–18 | | | 75–47 | P2 P3 |
| 11 Jun | 21:00 | Mexico | 1–3 | Kazakhstan | 20–25 | 18–25 | 28–26 | 20–25 | | 86–101 | P2 P3 |
| 11 Jun | 23:30 | Colombia | 3–0 | Australia | 25–17 | 25–20 | 25–15 | | | 75–52 | P2 P3 |
| 12 Jun | 21:00 | Mexico | 3–1 | Australia | 18–25 | 26–24 | 29–27 | 25–23 | | 98–99 | P2 P3 |
| 12 Jun | 23:30 | Colombia | 3–1 | Kazakhstan | 25–21 | 22–25 | 25–19 | 25–12 | | 97–77 | P2 P3 |

===== Pool D3 =====
- Venue: Coliseo Cerrado de Chiclayo, Chiclayo, Peru

| Date | Time | | Score | | Set 1 | Set 2 | Set 3 | Set 4 | Set 5 | Total | Report |
|---|---|---|---|---|---|---|---|---|---|---|---|
| 10 Jun | 21:35 | Croatia | 3–0 | Cuba | 25–13 | 25–15 | 25–13 | | | 75–41 | P2 P3 |
| 11 Jun | 00:05 | Peru | 3–0 | Algeria | 25–9 | 25–9 | 25–11 | | | 75–29 | P2 P3 |
| 11 Jun | 20:35 | Algeria | 0–3 | Croatia | 19–25 | 17–25 | 15–25 | | | 51–75 | P2 P3 |
| 11 Jun | 23:05 | Peru | 3–2 | Cuba | 25–14 | 23–25 | 20–25 | 25–19 | 15–6 | 108–89 | P2 P3 |
| 12 Jun | 21:35 | Cuba | 3–0 | Algeria | 25–13 | 25–12 | 25–20 | | | 75–45 | P2 P3 |
| 13 Jun | 00:05 | Peru | 3–1 | Croatia | 16–25 | 25–21 | 25–13 | 25–22 | | 91–81 | P2 P3 |

== Final round ==
- All times are Greenwich Mean Time (UTC±00:00).

=== Group 3 ===
- Venue: Baluan Sholak Sports Palace, Almaty, Kazakhstan

==== Final four (Week 3) ====
Semifinals
18 June
Peru | 1
Croatia | 3
18 June
Kazakhstan | 3
Colombia | 2

Final
19 June
Croatia | 3
Kazakhstan | 0
3rd place match
19 June
Peru | 3
Colombia | 2

===== Semifinals =====
| Date | Time | | Score | | Set 1 | Set 2 | Set 3 | Set 4 | Set 5 | Total | Report |
|---|---|---|---|---|---|---|---|---|---|---|---|
| 18 Jun | 06:10 | Peru | 1–3 | Croatia | 14–25 | 27–29 | 25–20 | 7–25 | | 73–99 | P2 P3 |
| 18 Jun | 09:10 | Kazakhstan | 3–2 | Colombia | 25–20 | 25–20 | 21–25 | 18–25 | 15–9 | 104–99 | P2 P3 |

===== 3rd place match =====
| Date | Time | | Score | | Set 1 | Set 2 | Set 3 | Set 4 | Set 5 | Total | Report |
|---|---|---|---|---|---|---|---|---|---|---|---|
| 19 Jun | 06:10 | Peru | 3–2 | Colombia | 25–17 | 21–25 | 25–22 | 23–25 | 15–6 | 109–95 | P2 P3 |

===== Final =====
| Date | Time | | Score | | Set 1 | Set 2 | Set 3 | Set 4 | Set 5 | Total | Report |
|---|---|---|---|---|---|---|---|---|---|---|---|
| 19 Jun | 09:10 | Croatia | 3–0 | Kazakhstan | 25–19 | 29–27 | 25–16 | | | 79–62 | P2 P3 |

=== Group 2 ===
- Venue: Palace of Culture and Sports, Varna, Bulgaria

==== Final four (Week 3) ====
Semifinals
18 June
Puerto Rico | 1
Dominican Republic | 3
18 June
Bulgaria | 1
Poland | 3

Final
19 June
Dominican Republic | 3
Poland | 2
3rd place match
19 June
Puerto Rico | 3
Bulgaria | 1

===== Semifinals =====
| Date | Time | | Score | | Set 1 | Set 2 | Set 3 | Set 4 | Set 5 | Total | Report |
|---|---|---|---|---|---|---|---|---|---|---|---|
| 18 Jun | 13:10 | Puerto Rico | 1–3 | Dominican Republic | 25–21 | 22–25 | 27–29 | 14–25 | | 88–100 | P2 P3 |
| 18 Jun | 16:10 | Bulgaria | 1–3 | Poland | 25–23 | 21–25 | 15–25 | 21–25 | | 82–98 | P2 P3 |

===== 3rd place match =====
| Date | Time | | Score | | Set 1 | Set 2 | Set 3 | Set 4 | Set 5 | Total | Report |
|---|---|---|---|---|---|---|---|---|---|---|---|
| 19 Jun | 13:10 | Puerto Rico | 3–1 | Bulgaria | 23–25 | 25–22 | 25–21 | 25–23 | | 98–91 | P2 P3 |

===== Final =====
| Date | Time | | Score | | Set 1 | Set 2 | Set 3 | Set 4 | Set 5 | Total | Report |
|---|---|---|---|---|---|---|---|---|---|---|---|
| 19 Jun | 16:10 | Dominican Republic | 3–2 | Poland | 21–25 | 23–25 | 25–18 | 25–20 | 15–11 | 109–99 | P2 P3 |

=== Group 1 ===
- Venue: Indoor Stadium Huamark, Bangkok, Thailand

==== Pool play (Week 6) ====
===== Pool J1 =====
| Pos | Team | Pld | W | L | Pts | SW | SL | SR | SPW | SPL | SPR | Qualification |
|---|---|---|---|---|---|---|---|---|---|---|---|---|
| 1 | Brazil | 2 | 2 | 0 | 6 | 6 | 0 | MAX | 151 | 104 | 1.452 | Semifinals |
| 2 | Russia | 2 | 1 | 1 | 3 | 3 | 3 | 1.000 | 131 | 143 | 0.916 | Semifinals |
| 3 | Thailand | 2 | 0 | 2 | 0 | 0 | 6 | 0.000 | 119 | 154 | 0.773 | 5th place match |

| Date | Time | | Score | | Set 1 | Set 2 | Set 3 | Set 4 | Set 5 | Total | Report |
|---|---|---|---|---|---|---|---|---|---|---|---|
| 6 Jul | 11:00 | Thailand | 0–3 | Brazil | 24–26 | 16–25 | 11–25 | | | 51–76 | P2 P3 |
| 7 Jul | 11:00 | Russia | 0–3 | Brazil | 22–25 | 10–25 | 21–25 | | | 53–75 | P2 P3 |
| 8 Jul | 11:00 | Thailand | 0–3 | Russia | 25–27 | 24–26 | 19–25 | | | 68–78 | P2 P3 |

===== Pool K1 =====
| Pos | Team | Pld | W | L | Pts | SW | SL | SR | SPW | SPL | SPR | Qualification |
|---|---|---|---|---|---|---|---|---|---|---|---|---|
| 1 | United States | 2 | 2 | 0 | 6 | 6 | 0 | MAX | 151 | 128 | 1.180 | Semifinals |
| 2 | Netherlands | 2 | 1 | 1 | 2 | 3 | 5 | 0.600 | 168 | 167 | 1.006 | Semifinals |
| 3 | China | 2 | 0 | 2 | 1 | 2 | 6 | 0.333 | 159 | 183 | 0.869 | 5th place match |

| Date | Time | | Score | | Set 1 | Set 2 | Set 3 | Set 4 | Set 5 | Total | Report |
|---|---|---|---|---|---|---|---|---|---|---|---|
| 6 Jul | 08:00 | United States | 3–0 | Netherlands | 25–21 | 25–17 | 25–23 | | | 75–61 | P2 P3 |
| 7 Jul | 08:00 | China | 2–3 | Netherlands | 25–23 | 14–25 | 25–19 | 20–25 | 8–15 | 92–107 | P2 P3 |
| 8 Jul | 08:00 | United States | 3–0 | China | 25–21 | 26–24 | 25–22 | | | 76–67 | P2 P3 |

==== Final four (Week 6) ====
Semifinals
9 July
Brazil | 3
Netherlands | 0
9 July
United States | 3
Russia | 0

Final
10 July
Brazil | 3
United States | 2
3rd place match
10 July
Netherlands | 3
Russia | 2

===== Semifinals =====
| Date | Time | | Score | | Set 1 | Set 2 | Set 3 | Set 4 | Set 5 | Total | Report |
|---|---|---|---|---|---|---|---|---|---|---|---|
| 9 Jul | 08:00 | Brazil | 3–0 | Netherlands | 25–18 | 25–16 | 25–23 | | | 75–57 | P2 P3 |
| 9 Jul | 11:00 | United States | 3–0 | Russia | 25–20 | 25–23 | 25–14 | | | 75–57 | P2 P3 |

===== 5th place match =====
| Date | Time | | Score | | Set 1 | Set 2 | Set 3 | Set 4 | Set 5 | Total | Report |
|---|---|---|---|---|---|---|---|---|---|---|---|
| 10 Jul | 05:00 | Thailand | 0–3 | China | 23–25 | 23–25 | 12–25 | | | 58–75 | P2 P3 |

===== 3rd place match =====
| Date | Time | | Score | | Set 1 | Set 2 | Set 3 | Set 4 | Set 5 | Total | Report |
|---|---|---|---|---|---|---|---|---|---|---|---|
| 10 Jul | 08:00 | Netherlands | 3–2 | Russia | 18–25 | 23–25 | 30–28 | 25–21 | 15–9 | 111–108 | P2 P3 |

===== Final =====
| Date | Time | | Score | | Set 1 | Set 2 | Set 3 | Set 4 | Set 5 | Total | Report |
|---|---|---|---|---|---|---|---|---|---|---|---|
| 10 Jul | 11:00 | Brazil | 3–2 | United States | 18–25 | 25–17 | 25–23 | 22–25 | 15–9 | 105–99 | P2 P3 |

== Final standing ==
| Rank | Team |
|---|---|
| 1st place, gold medalist(s) | Brazil |
| 2nd place, silver medalist(s) | United States |
| 3rd place, bronze medalist(s) | Netherlands |
| 4 | Russia |
| 5 | China |
| 6 | Thailand |
| 7 | Serbia |
| 8 | Italy |
| 9 | Japan |
| 10 | Turkey |
| 11 | Belgium |
| 12 | Germany |
| 13 | Dominican Republic |
| 14 | Poland |
| 15 | Puerto Rico |
| 16 | Bulgaria |
| 17 | Argentina |
| 18 | Czech Republic |
| 19 | Canada |
| 20 | Kenya |
| 21 | Croatia |
| 22 | Kazakhstan |
| 23 | Peru |
| 24 | Colombia |
| 25 | Cuba |
| 26 | Mexico |
| 27 | Australia |
| 28 | Algeria |

2016 World Grand Prix champions

Brazil
11th title

14-woman Roster for Group 1 Final Round
Fabiana Claudino (c), Juciely Barreto, Dani Lins, Adenízia da Silva, Thaísa Menezes, Jaqueline Carvalho, Roberta Ratzke, Gabriela Guimarães, Tandara Caixeta, Sheilla Castro, Fernanda Garay, Mariana Costa, Natália Pereira, Camila Brait, Léia Silva,
Head coach
José Roberto Guimarães

== Awards ==
- Most valuable player
  (Brazil) Natália Pereira
- Best Outside Hitters
  (Brazil) Sheilla Castro
  (United States) Kimberly Hill
- Best setter
  (Thailand) Nootsara Tomkom
- Best Middle Blockers
  (United States) Rachael Adams
  (Brazil) Thaísa Menezes
- Best libero
  (China) Lin Li
- Best Opposite
  (Netherlands) Lonneke Slöetjes

== Statistics leaders ==
The statistics of each group follows the vis reports P2 and P3. The statistics include 6 volleyball skills; serve, reception, set, spike, block, and dig. The table below shows the top 5 ranked players in each skill by group plus top scorers as of 26 June 2016.

=== Best scorers ===
Best scorers determined by scored points from spike, block and serve.

| | GROUP 1 | | GROUP 2 | | GROUP 3 | |
| Rank | Name | Points | Name | Points | Name | Points |
|---|---|---|---|---|---|---|
| 1 | (Russia) Nataliya Goncharova | 185 | (Poland) Berenika Tomsia | 167 | (Peru) Ángela Leyva | 203 |
| 2 | (Netherlands) Lonneke Slöetjes | 169 | (Bulgaria) Emiliya Nikolova | 138 | (Croatia) Samanta Fabris | 154 |
| 3 | (Turkey) Polen Uslupehlivan | 154 | (Dominican Republic) Brayelin Martínez | 138 | (Colombia) Madelaynne Montaño | 134 |
| 4 | (Thailand) Ajcharaporn Kongyot | 135 | (Dominican Republic) Bethania de la Cruz | 133 | (Colombia) Kenny Moreno | 126 |
| 5 | (Germany) Louisa Lippmann | 131 | (Puerto Rico) Karina Ocasio | 131 | (Kazakhstan) Radmila Beresneva | 86 |

=== Best spikers ===
Best spikers determined by successful spikes in percentage.

| | GROUP 1 | | GROUP 2 | | GROUP 3 | |
| Rank | Name | % | Name | % | Name | % |
|---|---|---|---|---|---|---|
| 1 | (Italy) Paola Egonu | 46.05 | (Dominican Republic) Brayelin Martínez | 43.32 | (Croatia) Samanta Fabris | 51.39 |
| 2 | (Netherlands) Lonneke Slöetjes | 45.91 | (Poland) Berenika Tomsia | 42.82 | (Peru) Ángela Leyva | 48.88 |
| 3 | (Russia) Nataliya Goncharova | 43.65 | (Puerto Rico) Stephanie Enright | 40.68 | (Croatia) Mira Topić | 46.67 |
| 4 | (United States) Kimberly Hill | 41.98 | (Bulgaria) Emiliya Nikolova | 40.33 | (Cuba) Heidy Rodríguez | 43.16 |
| 5 | (China) Zhu Ting | 40.76 | (Puerto Rico) Karina Ocasio | 40.31 | (Colombia) Kenny Moreno | 43.03 |

=== Best blockers ===
Best blockers determined by the average of stuff blocks per set.

| | GROUP 1 | | GROUP 2 | | GROUP 3 | |
| Rank | Name | Avg | Name | Avg | Name | Avg |
|---|---|---|---|---|---|---|
| 1 | (Russia) Irina Zaryazhko | 1.22 | (Poland) Agnieszka Kąkolewska | 0.97 | (Cuba) Daymara Lescay | 0.87 |
| 2 | (China) Xu Yunli | 0.73 | (Kenya) Brackcides Khadambi | 0.72 | (Kazakhstan) Kristina Anikonova | 0.67 |
| 3 | (China) Yan Ni | 0.67 | (Canada) Lucille Charuk | 0.71 | (Peru) Ángela Leyva | 0.61 |
| 4 | (Russia) Nataliya Goncharova | 0.67 | (Puerto Rico) Lynda Morales | 0.70 | (Cuba) Heidy Casanova | 0.61 |
| 5 | (Belgium) Freya Aelbrecht | 0.64 | (Puerto Rico) Karina Ocasio | 0.67 | (Colombia) Lorena Zuleta | 0.60 |

=== Best servers ===
Best servers determined by the average of aces per set.

| | GROUP 1 | | GROUP 2 | | GROUP 3 | |
| Rank | Name | Avg | Name | Avg | Name | Avg |
|---|---|---|---|---|---|---|
| 1 | (Thailand) Ajcharaporn Kongyot | 0.45 | (Argentina) Yael Castiglione | 0.42 | (Australia) Shae Sloane | 0.55 |
| 2 | (Turkey) Hande Baladın | 0.32 | (Puerto Rico) Áurea Cruz | 0.37 | (Croatia) Ana Grbac | 0.52 |
| 3 | (Turkey) Nursevil Aydinlar | 0.32 | (Poland) Anna Grejman | 0.36 | (Croatia) Samanta Fabris | 0.48 |
| 4 | (Netherlands) Yvon Beliën | 0.32 | (Argentina) Emilce Sosa | 0.33 | (Croatia) Mira Topić | 0.44 |
| 5 | (Italy) Antonella Del Core | 0.32 | (Bulgaria) Viktoriya Grigorova | 0.31 | (Algeria) Fahima Brahmi | 0.39 |

=== Best setters ===
Best setters determined by the average of running sets per set.

| | GROUP 1 | | GROUP 2 | | GROUP 3 | |
| Rank | Name | Avg | Name | Avg | Name | Avg |
|---|---|---|---|---|---|---|
| 1 | (Japan) Kanami Tashiro | 4.86 | (Poland) Joanna Wołosz | 10.70 | (Colombia) María Marín | 8.19 |
| 2 | (China) Ding Xia | 4.57 | (Puerto Rico) Vilmarie Mojica | 8.23 | (Kazakhstan) Irina Lukomskaya | 7.30 |
| 3 | (United States) Alisha Glass | 4.57 | (Argentina) Yael Castiglione | 7.67 | (Croatia) Ana Grbac | 6.26 |
| 4 | (Netherlands) Laura Dijkema | 4.34 | (Czech Republic) Pavla Vincourová | 4.61 | (Australia) Shae Sloane | 5.55 |
| 5 | (Thailand) Pornpun Guedpard | 4.29 | (Kenya) Jane Wairimu | 4.44 | (Peru) Alexandra Muñoz | 5.42 |

=== Best diggers ===
Best diggers determined by the average of successful digs per set.

| | GROUP 1 | | GROUP 2 | | GROUP 3 | |
| Rank | Name | Avg | Name | Avg | Name | Avg |
|---|---|---|---|---|---|---|
| 1 | (Russia) Anna Malova | 3.08 | (Czech Republic) Veronika Dostálová | 6.48 | (Mexico) Freda López | 3.29 |
| 2 | (Italy) Monica De Gennaro | 2.74 | (Argentina) Tatiana Rizzo | 5.04 | (Cuba) Emily Borrell | 2.96 |
| 3 | (Germany) Lenka Dürr | 2.10 | (Puerto Rico) Shara Venegas | 4.87 | (Australia) Alice De Innocentiis | 2.45 |
| 4 | (Thailand) Wilavan Apinyapong | 2.10 | (Poland) Agata Durajczyk | 3.27 | (Peru) Vanessa Palacios | 2.39 |
| 5 | (Belgium) Charlotte Leys | 2.09 | (Kenya) Brackcides Khadambi | 2.89 | (Mexico) Lizbeth Sainz | 2.14 |

=== Best receivers ===
Best receivers determined by efficient receptions in percentage.

| | GROUP 1 | | GROUP 2 | | GROUP 3 | |
| Rank | Name | % | Name | % | Name | % |
|---|---|---|---|---|---|---|
| 1 | (Thailand) Wilavan Apinyapong | 53.85 | (Puerto Rico) Áurea Cruz | 66.20 | (Colombia) Camila Gómez | 45.08 |
| 2 | (United States) Jordan Larson | 51.20 | (Poland) Agata Durajczyk | 61.88 | (Colombia) María Martínez | 44.67 |
| 3 | (Thailand) Piyanut Pannoy | 49.01 | (Czech Republic) Michaela Mlejnková | 54.05 | (Kazakhstan) Radmila Beresneva | 41.01 |
| 4 | (Germany) Lenka Dürr | 48.28 | (Argentina) Tatiana Rizzo | 53.96 | (Croatia) Mira Topić | 40.56 |
| 5 | (United States) Kelsey Robinson | 43.26 | (Bulgaria) Mariya Filipova | 51.72 | (Kazakhstan) Tatyana Fendrikova | 39.86 |

== See also ==
- 2016 FIVB Volleyball World League
- 2016 Women's European Volleyball League
- Volleyball at the 2016 Summer Olympics – Women's tournament
