= Pilar Marie Victoriá =

Puerto Rican volleyball player (1995–2024)

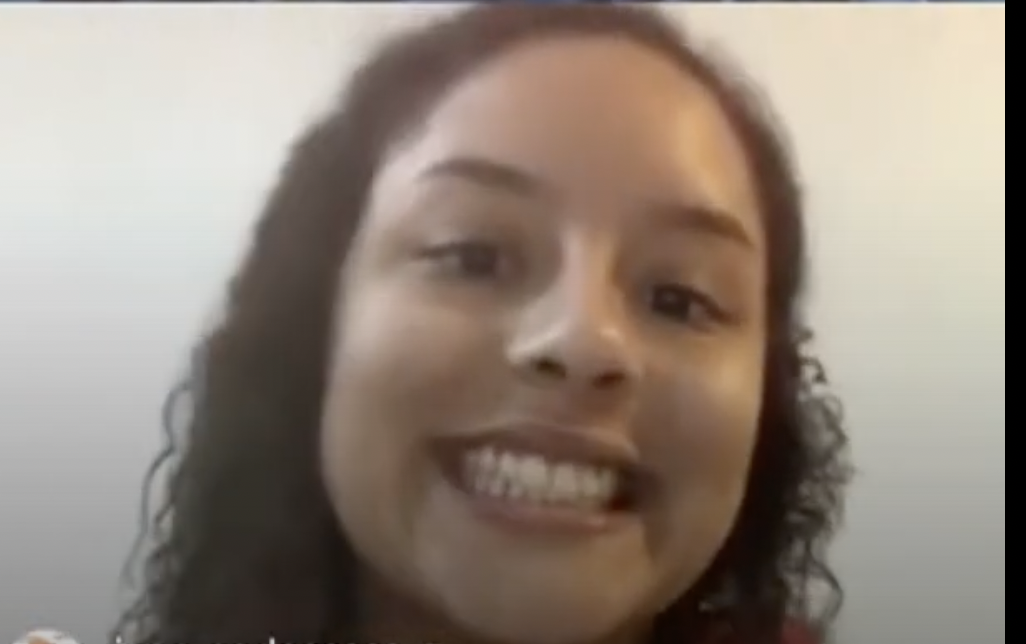
- Victoria López in 2019

Personal information
- Full name: Pilar Marie Victoriá López
- Nationality: Puerto Rico
- Born: October 11, 1995; Caguas, Puerto Rico
- Died: August 29, 2024 (aged 28); Bursa, Turkey
- Height: 1.82 m (6 ft 0 in)
- Weight: 73 kg (161 lb)
- Spike: 301 cm (119 in)
- Block: 268 cm (106 in)
- Education: Texas (2013–2015); Arkansas (2015–2017)

Volleyball information
- Position: Outside hitter
- Current club: Nilüfer Belediyespor (women's volleyball)

Career
| Years | Teams |
|---|---|
| 2018 | Givova Baronissi |

National team
| 2012–2023 | Puerto Rico |
Honours
Women's volleyball
Representing Puerto Rico
2010 NORCECA Youth Championship
| Bronze medal – third place | 2010 Guatemala | Team competition |

Pilar Marie Victoriá López (October 11, 1995 – August 29, 2024) was a Puerto Rican volleyball player. She played college volleyball for the Texas Longhorns and the Arkansas Razorbacks.

== Career ==
Victoriá competed for the Puerto Rico women's national volleyball team as well as the Puerto Rico Youth National Team and the Puerto Rico Junior National Team. In 2010, she won the bronze medal while competing with the Puerto Rico Youth National Team at the 2010 NORCECA Youth Championship in Guatemala. She named it as one of her most memorable achievements. In 2015, she became one of the preeminent offensive players in the nation as an outside hitter for the Arkansas Razorbacks.

She participated in the 2015 FIVB Volleyball World Grand Prix, and the 2016 FIVB Volleyball World Grand Prix. She died suddenly on August 29, 2024, in Turkey where she was playing volleyball for Nilüfer Belediyespor.

== Early life ==
Victoriá played volleyball for the Notre Dame High School Knights, where she was a four-time All-Star in the Puerto Rico High School Athletic Alliance and led her team to four consecutive league championships.

== College career ==
Victoria started her college career playing for the Texas Longhorns. She helped her team advance to the Final Four of the NCAA Division I Women's Volleyball Championship in both 2013 and 2014. In 2015, she transferred to the University of Arkansas, where she quickly established herself as the team's main offensive threat and one of the premier offensive players in the nation. On September 23, 2015, she had 30 kills in a 5-set win against LSU. On October 18, 2015, she recorded 35 kills in a 5-set loss against Ole Miss, which represents the second-highest in a single match in Arkansas history. On October 30, 2015, Victoria registered 32 kills in a 5-set win against Auburn. Her 525 total kills ranked first in the SEC conference and 13th in the nation, while her 4.61 kills per set also ranked first in the SEC and 10th in the nation. She was named to the All-SEC Team and to the AVCA All-Region South Team.

== Death ==
Victoriá died in Bursa, Turkey on August 29, 2024, at the age of 28. Her death was declared to have occurred naturally.
