= Shae Sloane =

Australian footballer

Personal information
- Nationality: Australian
- Born: 1 May 1992 (age 34); Upwey
- Hometown: Upwey
- Height: 176 cm (69 in)
- Weight: 76 kg (168 lb)
- Spike: 284 cm (112 in)
- Block: 270 cm (106 in)

Volleyball information
- Position: teacher
- Current club: Melbourne
- Number: 7

National team
2011	Australia

Shae Sloane (born 1 May 1992) is a retired professional Australian rules footballer, playing for the Melbourne Football Club in the AFL Women's competition. At club level, she played for University Blues in 2015. Her brother Rory Sloane was a former captain of the Adelaide Football Club. She has another older brother, Dylan.

Sloane's interest in volleyball started when she first tried it in year 7 at Upwey High School. She travelled to South America with the team to compete in the World Grand Prix. In April 2021, Sloane announced her retirement.
