= Lee Yi-hsuan =

Taiwanese volleyball player (born 1992)

Lee Yi Hsuan

Personal information
- Nationality: Chinese Taipei
- Born: 2 August 1992 (age 34)
- Height: 164 cm (65 in)
- Weight: 59 kg (130 lb)
- Spike: 286 cm (113 in)
- Block: 279 cm (110 in)

Volleyball information
- Number: 3 (national team)

National team
2012	Chinese Taipei

Lee Yi Hsuan (born 2 August 1992) is a Taiwanese female volleyball player. She was part of the Chinese Taipei women's national volleyball team.

She participated in the 2012 FIVB Volleyball World Grand Prix.
