= World Grand Prix =

World Grand Prix may refer to:

- World Grand Prix (darts), a darts tournament held each October
- World Grand Prix (snooker), a snooker tournament
- World Grand Prix (video game), a 1986 video game
- FIVB World Grand Prix, a defunct women's volleyball competition
- World Grand Prix, a fictional racing competition in Cars 2.
