= Remy McBain =

Puerto Rican volleyball player (born 1991)

Remy June McBain

Personal information
- Nationality: Puerto Rican
- Born: 27 August 1991 (age 35)
- Height: 1.88 m (6 ft 2 in)
- Weight: 68 kg (150 lb)
- Spike: 299 cm (118 in)
- Block: 289 cm (114 in)

Career
Years	Teams
2013	Mayaguez

National team
2013	Puerto Rico

Remy June McBain (born 27 August 1991) is a Puerto Rican female volleyball player. She was part of the Puerto Rico women's national volleyball team. She has been an assistant coach at Lake Erie College since 2015.

She participated in the 2013 FIVB Volleyball World Grand Prix. On club level she played for Mayaguez in 2013.
