= Ha Yu-jeong =

South Korean volleyball player (born 1989)

Personal information
- Nationality: South Korean
- Born: 26 December 1989 (age 36); Gumi, North Gyeongsang
- Height: 189 cm (74 in)
- Weight: 74 kg (163 lb)
- Spike: 287 cm (113 in)
- Block: 281 cm (111 in)

Volleyball information
- Number: 13 (national team)

Career
Years	Teams
2007–2016	Korea Expressway Corporation
2016	Daegu Metropolitan City Hall
2021–	Korea Expressway Corporation Hi-Pass

National team
2012–2014	South Korea

Ha Yu-jeong (Korean: 하유정; born 26 December 1989) is a South Korean volleyball player. She is part of the South Korea women's national volleyball team. She was part of the team at the 2012 Summer Olympics, finishing 4th. On club level she played for Korea Expressway Corporation in 2014.

== Education ==
- Daegu Girls' High School
- Daegu Il Middle School
- Bisan Elementary School
