= Ayumi Nakamura =

Japanese volleyball player (born 1990)

Personal information
- Nickname: Ayu
- Born: August 29, 1990 (age 36); Chikuzen, Fukuoka, Japan
- Height: 1.76 m (5 ft 9 1/2 in)
- Weight: 70 kg (150 lb)
- Spike: 298 cm (117 in)
- Block: 287 cm (113 in)

Volleyball information
- Position: Wing Spiker
- Current club: (Slovakia) VKP FTVŠ UK Bratislava
- Number: 4

National team
Japan

Ayumi Nakamura (中村 亜友美, Nakamura Ayumi; born August 29, 1990) is a Japanese volleyball player who plays for JT Marvelous. She also plays for the All-Japan women's volleyball team.

Nakamura played for the All-Japan team for the first time at the Montreux Volley Masters in May 2013.

== Clubs ==
- (Japan) Sawa Junior High
- (Japan) Seiei Highschool
- (Japan) Nippon Sport Science University (2009–2013)
- (Japan) JT Marvelous (2012–2017)
- (Israel) Hapoel Kfar Saba (2017–2018)
- (Israel) KK Tel Aviv (2018–2019, 2021–2023)
- (Japan) Maxvalu Himeji Viale (2019–2020)
- (Vietnam) Thanh Hóa VC (2023)
- (Peru) Olva Latino (2023–2024)
- (Slovakia) VKP FTVŠ UK Bratislava (2024–2025)

== Awards ==
=== Individuals ===
- 2012 All Japan Intercollegiate Volleyball Championship - Server award

=== Clubs ===
- 2008 Domestic Sports Festival (Highschool category) - Champion, with Seiei Highschool.
- 2011 Volleyball at the 2011 Summer Universiade - 4th place, with Japanese Universiade team.
- 2012 All Japan Intercollegiate Volleyball Championship - Runner-Up, with Nippon Sport Science University.
