= Lee Yi-ping =

Taiwanese volleyball player (born 1989)

Lee Yi Ping

Personal information
- Nationality: Chinese Taipei
- Born: 8 August 1989 (age 37)
- Height: 177 cm (70 in)
- Weight: 70 kg (154 lb)
- Spike: 291 cm (115 in)
- Block: 286 cm (113 in)

Volleyball information
- Number: 7 (national team)

National team
2012	Chinese Taipei

Lee Yi Ping (born 8 August 1989) is a Taiwanese female volleyball player. She was part of the Chinese Taipei women's national volleyball team.

She participated in the 2012 FIVB Volleyball World Grand Prix.
