= Kanisha Jimenez =

Puerto Rican volleyball player (born 1995)

Personal information
- Nationality: Puerto Rican
- Born: 28 November 1995 (age 30); Toa Baja, Puerto Rico
- Height: 185 cm (6 ft 1 in)
- Weight: 56 kg (123 lb)
- Spike: 295 cm (116 in)
- Block: 201 cm (79 in)
- Education: University of Tennessee

Volleyball information
- Position: spiker
- Number: 16

National team
Puerto Rico
Honours
Women's volleyball
Representing Puerto Rico

Kanisha Jimenez (born 28 November 1995) is a Puerto Rican female volleyball player. She participated in the 2013 FIVB World Grand Prix.

She played high school volleyball at Academia Discipulos de Cristo in Bayamón, Puerto Rico. Later played for University of Tennessee.
