= Mira Topić =

Croatian volleyball player (born 1983)

Personal information
- Nationality: Croatian
- Born: 2 June 1983 (age 43); Split, SR Croatia, SFR Yugoslavia
- Height: 189 cm (74 in)
- Weight: 75 kg (165 lb)
- Spike: 322 cm (127 in)
- Block: 303 cm (119 in)

Volleyball information
- Position: Outside-spiker

Career
Years	Teams
2015	Impel Breslavia

National team
2015	Croatia

Mira Topić (born 2 June 1983) is a Croatian female volleyball player, playing as an outside-spiker. She is part of the Croatia women's national volleyball team. She competed at the 2015 Women's European Volleyball Championship. On club level she plays for Impel Breslavia.
