= Hà Ngọc Diễm =

Vietnamese volleyball player (born 1994)

Personal information
- Full name: Hà Ngọc Diễm
- Born: December 22, 1994 (age 31); Vinh Long, Vietnam
- Height: 177 cm (5 ft 10 in)
- Weight: 60 kg (132 lb)
- Spike: 310 cm (120 in)
- Block: 302 cm (119 in)

Volleyball information
- Position: Outside hitter

Career
Years	Teams
2009 – 2014, 2017 – 2019	(Vietnam) Vĩnh Long VC
2015 – 2016	(Vietnam) VTV Bình Điền Long An
2017 (loan)	(Vietnam) Thông tin LienVietPostBank
2018 (loan)	(Vietnam) Vietinbank VC

National team
2013 – 2017	Vietnam
Honours
Women's volleyball
Representing Vietnam
Southeast Asian Games
Silver medal – second place	2013 Naypyidaw	Team
Silver medal – second place	2015 Singapore	Team
Bronze medal – third place	2017 Kuala Lumpur	Team

Hà Ngọc Diễm (born December 22, 1994) is a retired Vietnamese volleyball player. She is a former member of Vietnam women's volleyball team. At 2014 VTV International Women's Volleyball Cup, she won her first title representing for national team. In 2015, Ha Ngoc Diem plays for VTV Bình Điền Long An, with captain Nguyễn Thị Ngọc Hoa to help the team win the 1st place at Vietnam Volleyball League Championship, defeat Thông tin Liên Việt Post Bank 3-2 in final.

Ngọc Diễm played for VTV Bình Điền Long An the 2015/16 season and the 2017, on loan with Thông tin Liên Việt Post Bank.

== Clubs ==
- (Vietnam) Vĩnh Long VC (2009 – 2014, 2017 – 2019)
- (Vietnam) VTV Bình Điền Long An (2015 – 2016)
- (Vietnam) Thông tin LienVietPostBank (2017) (loan)
- (Vietnam) Vietinbank VC (2018) (loan)

== Career ==
=== National teams ===
- 2013 SEA Games — Silver Medal
- 2014 Asian Cup — 8th Place
- 2015 Asian Championship — 5th Place
- 2015 SEA Games — Silver Medal
- 2016 Asian Cup — 7th Place
- 2017 Asian Championship — 5th Place
- 2017 SEA Games — Bronze Medal

=== Clubs ===
- 2015 Vietnam League – 3rd Place, with VTV Bình Điền Long An
- 2016 Vietnam League – 3rd Place, with VTV Bình Điền Long An
