= VTV International Women's Volleyball Cup =

- Founded: 2004
- Country: Vietnam
- Confederation: Various
- Number of clubs: 8 (2025)
- Current champions: (Russia) Korabelka (2nd title)
- Most championships: Vietnam (6 titles)

The VTV International Women's Volleyball Cup is an international volleyball tournament for women organised by the Volleyball Federation of Vietnam (VFV), and sponsored by Vietnam Television (VTV). The cup was established in 2004 and held every year. From 2020 to 2022, the tournament was cancelled due to the COVID-19 pandemic and the reschedule of Tokyo 2020 Summer Olympics and the 2021 Southeast Asian Games.

== Past champions ==
| Year | Host city | Final match | | | Third place match | | |
| Year | Host city | Champions | Score | Runners-up | Third place | Score | Fourth place |
|---|---|---|---|---|---|---|---|
| 2004 details | Nam Định | (China); Nanjing | 3–0 | (Kazakhstan); Rahat Almaty | (China); Honghe | 3–1 | Vietnam |
| 2005 details | Nam Định | (Japan); Denso Airybees | 3–1 | Vietnam | (China); Honghe | 3–2 | (Kazakhstan); Zhetysu Almaty |
| 2006 details | Vĩnh Phúc | (China); Sichuan | 3–2 | Vietnam | (China); Nankai University | 3–0 | Thailand |
| 2007 details | Ho Chi Minh City | Vietnam | 3–1 | (United States); St. John's University | (Kazakhstan); Zhetysu Almaty | 3–2 | (Japan); Shikoku Eighty 8 Queen |
| 2008 details | Cần Thơ | (North Korea); 4.25 SC | 3–1 | (Kazakhstan); Zhetysu Almaty | Vietnam | 3–0 | Australia |
| 2009 details | Đắk Lắk | Vietnam | 3–0 | Technocom Ukraine | (China); Guangdong Evergrande | 3–1 | (Thailand); Kathu Phuket |
| 2010 details | Đắk Lắk | Vietnam | 3–2 | (Ukraine); Vingroup | Thailand U20 | 3–1 | (Vietnam); VTV Bình Điền Long An |
| 2011 details | Đắk Lắk | Japan U23 | 3–0 | (China); Beijing BAW | Vietnam | 3–0 | North Korea |
| 2012 details | Vĩnh Phúc | Japan U23 | 3–0 | North Korea | (South Korea); Hwaseong IBK Altos | 3–2 | Vietnam |
| 2013 details | Ninh Bình | (China); Jiangsu ECE Volleyball | 3–1 | Vietnam | (China); Shandong Laishang Bank | 3–0 | Kazakhstan U23 |
| 2014 details | Bắc Ninh | Vietnam | 3–1 | Thailand U23 | North Korea | 3–0 | Kazakhstan U23 |
| 2015 details | Bạc Liêu | Thailand U23 | 3–1 | (China); Liaoning Brilliance Auto | (North Korea); 4.25 SC | 3–1 | Vietnam |
| 2016 details | Hà Nam | (Thailand); Supreme Chonburi | 3–0 | Vietnam | Indonesia | 3–0 | China U18 |
| 2017 details | Hải Dương | Japan U23 | 3–0 | Indonesia | Vietnam | 3–0 | (South Korea); Suwon City |
| 2018 details | Hà Tĩnh | Vietnam | 3–0 | North Korea | (China); Sichuan | 3–2 | (Kazakhstan); Altay |
| 2019 details | Quảng Nam | (Japan); NEC Red Rockets | 3–1 | Vietnam | North Korea | 3–0 | (China); Fujian |
| 2023 details | Lào Cai | Vietnam 1 | 3–0 | Vietnam 2 | (Philippines); Choco Mucho Flying Titans | 3–1 | (Japan); Kansai University of Social Welfare |
| 2024 details | Ninh Bình | (Russia); Korabelka | 3–0 | Vietnam | (South Korea); Korea Expressway Corporation Hi-Pass | 3–1 | (Kazakhstan); Kuanysh |
| 2025 details | Phú Thọ | (Russia); Korabelka | 3–2 | Vietnam | Chinese Taipei | 3–0 | Philippines |
| 2026 details | Phú Thọ | | | | | | |

== Medal table ==
| Rank | Nation | Gold | Silver | Bronze | Total |
|---|---|---|---|---|---|
| 1 | Vietnam (VIE) | 6 | 8 | 3 | 17 |
| 2 | Japan (JPN) | 5 | 0 | 0 | 5 |
| 3 | China (CHN) | 3 | 2 | 6 | 11 |
| 4 | Thailand (THA) | 2 | 1 | 1 | 4 |
| 5 | Russia (RUS) | 2 | 0 | 0 | 2 |
| 6 | North Korea (PRK) | 1 | 2 | 3 | 6 |
| 7 | Kazakhstan (KAZ) | 0 | 2 | 1 | 3 |
| 8 | Ukraine (UKR) | 0 | 2 | 0 | 2 |
| 9 | Indonesia (INA) | 0 | 1 | 1 | 2 |
| 10 | United States (USA) | 0 | 1 | 0 | 1 |
| 11 | South Korea (KOR) | 0 | 0 | 2 | 2 |
| 12 | Chinese Taipei (TPE) | 0 | 0 | 1 | 1 |
| 12 | Philippines (PHI) | 0 | 0 | 1 | 1 |
| Totals (13 entries) | | 19 | 19 | 19 | 57 |

== Awards ==
=== Most valuable player ===
- 2004 – (Kazakhstan) Yelena Pavlova
- 2005 – (Japan) Ayako Sana
- 2006 – (China) Chen Jing
- 2007 – (Kazakhstan) Tatyana Pyurova
- 2008 – (North Korea) Jong Jin-sim
- 2009 – (Vietnam) Nguyễn Thị Ngọc Hoa
- 2010 – (Vietnam) Đỗ Thị Minh
- 2011 – (Japan) Asuka Minamoto
- 2012 – (North Korea) Jong Jin-sim
- 2013 – (Vietnam) Nguyễn Thị Ngọc Hoa
- 2014 – (Vietnam) Nguyễn Thị Ngọc Hoa
- 2015 – (North Korea) Jong Jin-sim
- 2016 – (Indonesia) Aprilia Santini Manganang
- 2017 – (Japan) Yūka Imamura
- 2018 – (Vietnam) Trần Thị Thanh Thúy
- 2019 – (Japan) Mizuki Yanagita
- 2023 – (Vietnam) Trần Thị Thanh Thúy
- 2024 – (Russia) Elizaveta Nesterova
- 2025 – (Russia) Elizaveta Nesterova

=== Miss Volleyball ===
- 2004 – (Vietnam) Phạm Thị Kim Huệ
- 2005 – (Japan) Kaori Inoue
- 2006 – (Thailand) Boonchoo Saengravee
- 2007 – (Japan) Ayana Ida
- 2008 – (Vietnam) Phạm Thị Yến
- 2009 – (China) Chen Jiao
- 2010 – (Ukraine) Maryna Degtyarova
- 2011 – (South Korea) Ji Jung-hee
- 2012 – (Japan) Misaki Tanaka
- 2013 – (Kazakhstan) Aliya Batkuldina
- 2014 – (Vietnam) Lê Thanh Thúy
- 2015 – (Vietnam) Nguyễn Linh Chi
- 2016 – (Indonesia) Nandita Ayu Salsabila
- 2017 – (South Korea) Lee Yun-jung
- 2018 – (Vietnam) Đặng Thị Kim Thanh
- 2019 – (Kazakhstan) Dinara Syzdykova
- 2023 – (Vietnam) Hoàng Thị Kiều Trinh
- 2024 – (Russia) Elizaveta Palshina
- 2025 – (Philippines) Leila Jane Cruz

== See also ==
- VTV9 – Binh Dien International Women's Volleyball Cup
- Memorial of Hubert Jerzy Wagner
- Montreux Volley Masters
- William Jones Cup
- FIBA Intercontinental Cup
- Merlion Cup (basketball)
- Guystac Trophy
- IIHF Development Cup
- Intersport Cup
- Carpathian Trophy (women's handball)
- Carpathian Trophy (men's handball)
