= 2025 VTV International Women's Volleyball Cup =

Volleyball tournament in Vĩnh Phúc, Vietnam

Tournament details
- Host country: Vietnam
- City: Phú Thọ
- Dates: 28 June–5 July
- Teams: 8
- Venue: 1 (in 1 host city)

Final positions
- Champions: (Russia) Korabelka (2nd title)
- Runners-up: Vietnam
- Third place: Chinese Taipei
- Fourth place: Philippines

Tournament awards
- MVP: (Russia) Elizaveta Nesterova
- Best Setter: (Russia) Irina Filishtinskaya
- Best OH: (Vietnam) Trần Thị Thanh Thúy; (Russia) Bobrova Viktoriia
- Best MB: (Russia) Palshina Elizaveta; (Chinese Taipei) Kan Ko-Hui
- Best OPP: (Vietnam) Nguyễn Thị Bích Tuyền
- Best Libero: (Vietnam) Nguyễn Khánh Đang

Tournament statistics
- Matches played: 24

The 2025 VTV Cup, known as the 2025 VTV Ferroli Cup for sponsorship reasons, was the 19th edition of the VTV International Women's Volleyball Cup organized by the Volleyball Federation of Vietnam (VFV), and sponsored by Vietnam Television (VTV).

The tournament was held in Phú Thọ and played from 28 June to 5 July.

This tournament celebrated the 55th anniversary of Vietnam Television (7 September 1970 - 7 September 2025). This was also the third time this tournament applied Video Challenge Eyes after the 2023 and 2024 editions.

== Teams participated ==
8 teams were set to participate at the tournament. Hosts Vietnam sent two national teams, Vietnam senior team and Vietnam U21 team to compete along with six guest teams. Defending champions Korabelka also returned to the tournament.

On 22 May 2025, the Philippine National Volleyball Federation (PNVF) stated the Philippines national team replaced Petro Gazz Angels in the tournament as part of the national team's 2025 season.

- Vietnam
- Vietnam U21
- Australia
- Chinese Taipei
- (China) Sichuan Wuliangchun
- (Russia) Korabelka
- (Thailand) Est Cola
- Philippines (replaced Petro Gazz Angels)

== Preliminary round ==
- All times are Indochina Time (UTC+07:00).

=== Pool A ===
Pos	Team	Pld	W	L	Pts	SW	SL	SR	SPW	SPL	SPR	Qualification
1	Vietnam (H)	3	3	0	9	9	0	MAX	225	172	1.308	Quarterfinals
2	Philippines	3	2	1	6	6	4	1.500	231	197	1.173	Quarterfinals
3	(China) Sichuan Wuliangchun	3	1	2	3	4	7	0.571	238	252	0.944	Quarterfinals
4	Australia	3	0	3	0	1	9	0.111	180	253	0.711	Quarterfinals

Source: thethaovanhoa.vn
(H) Host

Date	Time		Score		Set 1	Set 2	Set 3	Set 4	Set 5	Total	Report
28 Jun	19:30	Australia	0–3	Vietnam	18–25	17–25	14–25			49–75	VOD
29 Jun	16:30	Sichuan Wuliangchun (China)	3–1	Australia	25–21	25–19	28–30	25–13		103–83	VOD
29 Jun	19:00	Vietnam	3–0	Philippines	25–20	25–21	25–21			75–62	VOD
30 Jun	16:30	Sichuan Wuliangchun (China)	1–3	Philippines	12–25	22–25	25–19	15–25		74–94	VOD
1 Jul	14:00	Philippines	3–0	Australia	25–13	25–15	25–20			75–48	VOD
1 Jul	19:30	Sichuan Wuliangchun (China)	0–3	Vietnam	21–25	22–25	18–25			61–75	VOD

=== Pool B ===
Pos	Team	Pld	W	L	Pts	SW	SL	SR	SPW	SPL	SPR	Qualification
1	(Russia) Korabelka	3	3	0	8	9	3	3.000	279	244	1.143	Quarterfinals
2	Chinese Taipei	3	2	1	6	7	4	1.750	265	247	1.073	Quarterfinals
3	(Thailand) Est Cola	3	1	2	4	6	7	0.857	295	293	1.007	Quarterfinals
4	Vietnam U21 (H)	3	0	3	0	1	9	0.111	198	253	0.783	Quarterfinals

Source: thethaovanhoa.vn
(H) Host

Date	Time		Score		Set 1	Set 2	Set 3	Set 4	Set 5	Total	Report
28 Jun	13:30	Chinese Taipei	3–0	Vietnam U21	25–9	25–21	25–20			75–50	VOD
28 Jun	16:00	Est Cola (Thailand)	2–3	(Russia) Korabelka	25–27	25–11	13–25	25–22	11–15	99–100	VOD
29 Jun	14:00	Vietnam U21	1–3	(Thailand) Est Cola	31–33	25–20	22–25	18–25		96–103	VOD
30 Jun	14:00	Chinese Taipei	3–1	(Thailand) Est Cola	26–24	21–25	25–21	25–23		97–93	VOD
30 Jun	19:30	Korabelka (Russia)	3–0	Vietnam U21	25–19	25–19	25–14			75–52	VOD
1 Jul	16:30	Chinese Taipei	1–3	(Russia) Korabelka	28–30	26–24	22–25	17–25		93–104	VOD

== Final round ==
- All times are Indochina Time (UTC+07:00).

Quarterfinals
3 July
Vietnam	3
Vietnam U21	0
3 July
Chinese Taipei	3
(China) Sichuan Wuliangchun	0
3 July
(Russia) Korabelka	3
Australia	0
3 July
Philippines	3
(Thailand) Est Cola	0

Semifinals
4 July
Vietnam	3
Chinese Taipei	0
4 July
(Russia) Korabelka	3
Philippines	1

Final
5 July
Vietnam	2
(Russia) Korabelka	3
3rd place match
5 July
Chinese Taipei	3
Philippines	0

5th–8th semifinals
4 July
Vietnam U21	3
(China) Sichuan Wuliangchun	0
4 July
Australia	0
(Thailand) Est Cola	3

5th place match
5 July
Vietnam U21	1
(Thailand) Est Cola	3
7th place match
5 July
(China) Sichuan Wuliangchun	3
Australia	0

=== Quarterfinals ===
Date	Time		Score		Set 1	Set 2	Set 3	Set 4	Set 5	Total	Report
3 Jul	12:00	Korabelka (Russia)	3–0	Australia	25–16	25–16	25–12			75–44	VOD
3 Jul	14:30	Chinese Taipei	3–0	(China) Sichuan Wuliangchun	25–16	25–16	25–16			75–48	VOD
3 Jul	17:00	Philippines	3–0	(Thailand) Est Cola	25–17	25–21	25–21			75–59	VOD
3 Jul	19:30	Vietnam	3–0	Vietnam U21	25–21	25–13	25–9			75–43	VOD

=== 5th–8th semifinals ===
Date	Time		Score		Set 1	Set 2	Set 3	Set 4	Set 5	Total	Report
4 Jul	12:00	Australia	0–3	(Thailand) Est Cola	16–25	22–25	20–25			58–75	VOD
4 Jul	14:30	Vietnam U21	3–0	(China) Sichuan Wuliangchun	25–17	25–22	25–20			75–59	VOD

=== Semifinals ===
Date	Time		Score		Set 1	Set 2	Set 3	Set 4	Set 5	Total	Report
4 Jul	17:00	Korabelka (Russia)	3–1	Philippines	25–16	25–27	25–17	25–22		100–82	VOD
4 Jul	19:30	Vietnam	3–0	Chinese Taipei	25–13	25–19	25–16			75–48	VOD

=== 7th place match ===
Date	Time		Score		Set 1	Set 2	Set 3	Set 4	Set 5	Total	Report
5 Jul	12:00	Sichuan Wuliangchun (China)	3–0	Australia	25–10	25–17	31–29			81–56	VOD

=== 5th place match ===
Date	Time		Score		Set 1	Set 2	Set 3	Set 4	Set 5	Total	Report
5 Jul	14:30	Vietnam U21	1–3	(Thailand) Est Cola	25–20	16–25	22–25	19–25		82–95	VOD

=== 3rd place match ===
Date	Time		Score		Set 1	Set 2	Set 3	Set 4	Set 5	Total	Report
5 Jul	17:00	Chinese Taipei	3–0	Philippines	25–17	26–24	25–22			76–63	VOD

=== Final ===
Date	Time		Score		Set 1	Set 2	Set 3	Set 4	Set 5	Total	Report
5 Jul	19:30	Vietnam	2–3	(Russia) Korabelka	19–25	14–25	25–23	25–21	18–20	101–114	VOD

== Final standing ==
Rank	Team
1st place, gold medalist(s)	(Russia) Korabelka
2nd place, silver medalist(s)	Vietnam
3rd place, bronze medalist(s)	Chinese Taipei
4	Philippines
5	(Thailand) Est Cola
6	Vietnam U21
7	(China) Sichuan Wuliangchun
8	Australia

2025 VTV Cup champions
(Russia)
Korabelka
2nd title

== Awards ==
- Most valuable player
  (Russia) Elizaveta Nesterova (Korabelka)
- Best setter
  (Russia) Irina Filishtinskaya (Korabelka)
- Best outside spikers
  (Russia) Viktoria Bobrova (Korabelka)
  Trần Thị Thanh Thúy (Vietnam)
- Best middle blockers
  Kan Ko-hui (Chinese Taipei)
  (Russia) Elizaveta Palshina (Korabelka)
- Best opposite spiker
  Nguyễn Thị Bích Tuyền (Vietnam)
- Best libero
  Nguyễn Khánh Đang (Vietnam)
- Miss VTV Cup 2025
  Leila Jane Cruz (Philippines)

== Broadcasting rights ==
Country/region	Broadcaster	Ref
Vietnam	Vietnam Television, YouTube (VTV Sports)	
Indonesia; Mongolia; Philippines; Russia; Thailand	YouTube (VTV Sports)	
Global	YouTube (Usports)	
