= Bùi Thị Ngà =

Vietnamese volleyball player

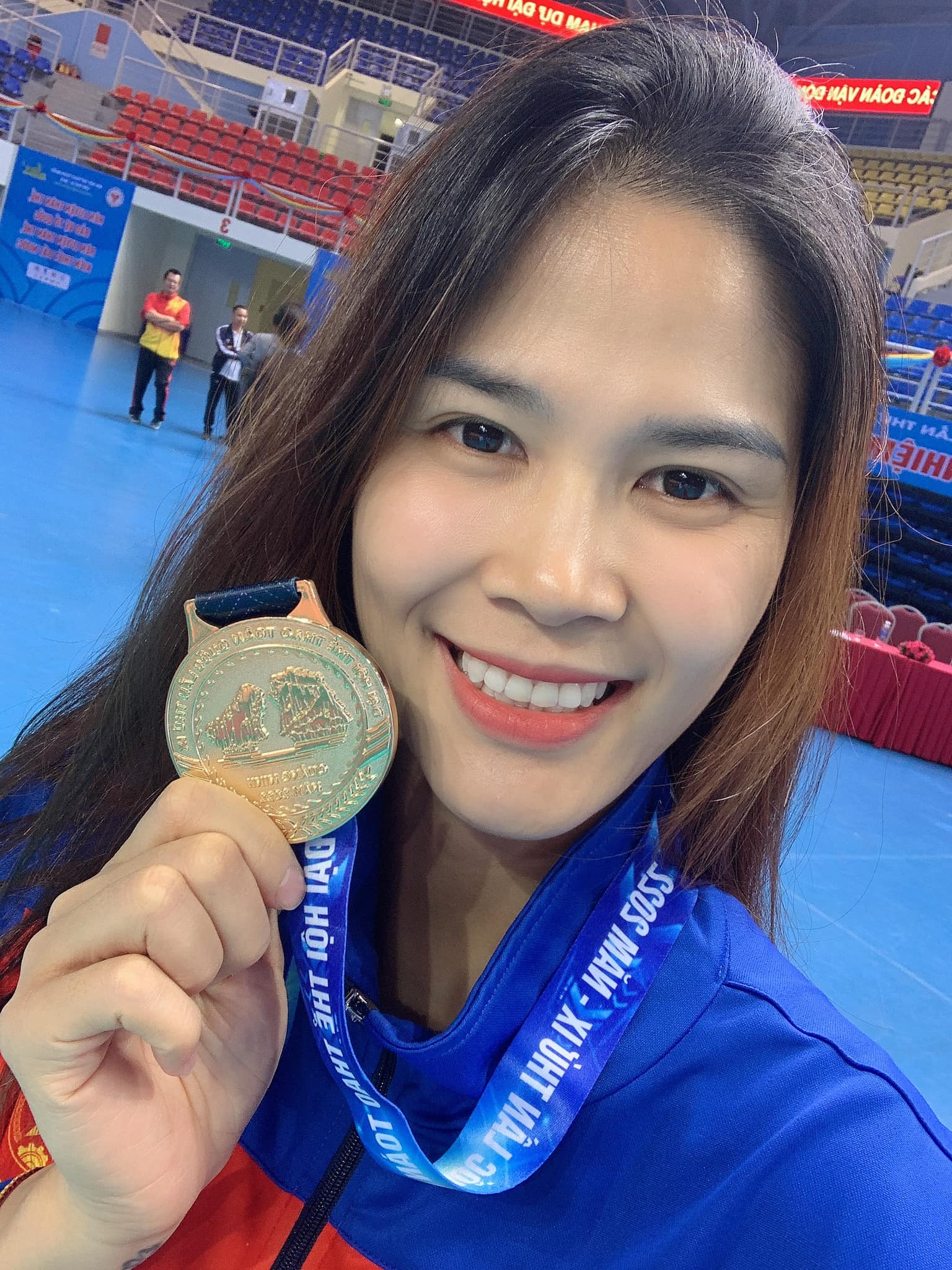

Personal information
- Full name: Bùi Thị Ngà
- Nickname: Tiểu Ngố
- Born: August 15, 1994 (age 32) Yên Khánh, Ninh Bình, Vietnam
- Height: 1.86 m (6 ft 1 in)
- Weight: 74 kg (163 lb)
- Spike: 309 cm (10 ft 2 in)
- Block: 298 cm (9 ft 9 in)

Volleyball information
- Position: Middle Blocker
- Current club: Thông tin Liên Việt Post Bank
- Number: 16

National team
- Years: Team
- 2012–2019: Vietnam
Honours
Women's volleyball
Representing Vietnam
Southeast Asian Games
Silver medal – second place	2013 Naypyidaw	Team
Silver medal – second place	2015 Singapore	Team
Silver medal – second place	2019 Pasig	Team
Bronze medal – third place	2017 Kuala Lumpur	Team

Bùi Thị Ngà (born August 15, 1994 in Ninh Bình) is a former member of the Vietnam women's national volleyball team. She was the captain of Bộ Tư lệnh Thông tin Women's Volleyball Club.

== Biography & career ==
Ngà was born in 1994 in Khánh Cường, Yên Khánh, Ninh Bình.

Ngà played for the club Thông tin Liên Việt Post Bank. In 2011, she played in the Vietnam's National Youth Team. After a year, she was given an official competitive spot by the team's coaches.

At ASIAD 2018, Ngà – along with Trần Thị Thanh Thúy – were the two athletes who scored the most points for Vietnam's team after 6 matches.

== Awards ==
=== Individual ===
- 2013 VTV Cup Championship "Best Blocker"
- 2014 VTV Binh Dien International Cup "Best Blocker"
- 2014 VTV Binh Dien International Cup "Best Spiker"
- 2014 VTV Cup Championship "Best Blocker"
- 2018 VTV Cup Championship "Best Middle Blocker"
- 2019 VTV Cup Championship "Best Middle Blocker"

=== Clubs ===
- 2011 Vietnam League – Runner-Up, with Thông tin Liên Việt Post Bank
- 2012 Vietnam League – Champion, with Thông tin Liên Việt Post Bank
- 2013 Vietnam League – Champion, with Thông tin Liên Việt Post Bank
- 2014 Vietnam League – Champion, with Thông tin Liên Việt Post Bank
- 2015 Vietnam League – Champion, with Thông tin Liên Việt Post Bank
- 2016 Vietnam League – Runner-Up, with Thông tin Liên Việt Post Bank
- 2017 Vietnam League – Runner-Up, with Thông tin Liên Việt Post Bank
- 2018 Vietnam League – Runner-Up, with Thông tin Liên Việt Post Bank
- 2019 Vietnam League – Champion, with Thông tin Liên Việt Post Bank
- 2020 Vietnam League – Champion, with Thông tin Liên Việt Post Bank
- 2021 Vietnam League – Champion, with Bộ Tư lệnh Thông tin – FLC

=== National team ===
- 2012 Asian Cup - 4th Place
- 2013 Asian Championship - 6th Place
- 2013 Southeast Asian Games - Silver Medal
- 2014 Asian Cup - 8th Place
- 2015 Asian Championship - 5th Place
- 2015 Southeast Asian Games - Silver Medal
- 2017 Asian Championship - 5th Place
- 2017 Southeast Asian Games - Bronze Medal
- 2018 Asian Games - 6th Place
- 2018 Asian Cup - 5th Place
- 2019 ASEAN Grand Prix – First Leg - 4th Place
- 2019 ASEAN Grand Prix – Second Leg - 4th Place
- 2019 Southeast Asian Games - Silver Medal
