= 2026 VTV International Women's Volleyball Cup =

Volleyball tournament in Phú Thọ, Vietnam

Tournament details
- Host country: Vietnam
- City: Lâm Đồng
- Dates: 8–15 August
- Teams: 8
- Venue: 1 (in 1 host city)

The 2026 VTV Cup will be the 20th edition of the VTV International Women's Volleyball Cup organized by the Volleyball Federation of Vietnam (VFV), and sponsored by Vietnam Television (VTV).

The tournament will be held in Lâm Đồng and played from 8 to 15 August.

== Teams participated ==
8 teams were set to participate at the tournament. Hosts Lâm Đồng compete along with seven guest teams. Defending champions Korabelka will return to the tournament as two-time defending champions.

- (Vietnam) Lâm Đồng
- (China) Guangdong
- (China) Henan Shuanghui
- (Chinese Taipei) KingWhale Taipei
- (Russia) Dinamo Anapa
- (Russia) Korabelka
- (Kazakhstan) Kuanysh
- (Thailand) Nakhon Ratchasima
