= 2024 VTV International Women's Volleyball Cup =

Tournament details
- Host country: Vietnam
- City: Ninh Bình
- Dates: 24–31 August
- Teams: 8
- Venue: 1

Final positions
- Champions: (Russia) Korabelka (1st title)

Tournament awards
- MVP: (Russia) Elizaveta Nesterova

The 2024 VTV Cup was the 18th edition of the VTV International Women's Volleyball Cup organized by the Volleyball Federation of Vietnam (VFV), and sponsored by Vietnam Television (VTV).

The tournament was held on Ninh Bình and played from 24 August to 31 August. This was also the second time this tournament applied the Video Challenge Eyes after 2023 edition.

Russia's Korabelka won the first title after defeating host Vietnam in the final. Korea Expressway Corporation Hi-Pass from South Korea defeated Kuanysh from Kazakhstan in the 3rd place match and took the bronze medal. Elizaveta Nesterova was named as the MVP of the tournament.

== Team participated ==
List of 8 teams that participated in the tournament. This is the first time that the Russian Federation had a representative participating in the tournament.

- Vietnam (host)
- (China) Henan Shuanghui
- (Chinese Taipei) KingWhale Taipei
- (Japan) Aranmare Yamagata
- (Kazakhstan) Kuanysh
- (Philippines) NU Lady Bulldogs
- (Russia) Korabelka
- (South Korea) Korea Expressway Corporation Hi-Pass

== Preliminary round ==
- All times are Indochina Time (UTC+07:00).

=== Pool A ===
Pos	Team	Pld	W	L	Pts	SW	SL	SR	SPW	SPL	SPR	Qualification
1	(South Korea) Korea Expressway Corporation Hi-Pass	3	2	1	7	8	3	2.667	253	206	1.228	Quarterfinals
2	(Kazakhstan) Kuanysh	3	2	1	6	6	3	2.000	206	195	1.056	Quarterfinals
3	Vietnam (H)	3	2	1	5	6	5	1.200	230	231	0.996	Quarterfinals
4	(Philippines) NU Lady Bulldogs	3	0	3	0	0	9	0.000	169	226	0.748	Quarterfinals

Source: VTV
(H) Host

Date	Time		Score		Set 1	Set 2	Set 3	Set 4	Set 5	Total	Report
24 Aug	13:30	NU Lady Bulldogs (Philippines)	0–3	(South Korea) Korea Expressway	17–25	20–25	15–25			52–75	
24 Aug	19:30	Vietnam	0–3	(Kazakhstan) Kuanysh	20–25	13–25	23–25			56–75	
25 Aug	16:30	NU Lady Bulldogs (Philippines)	0–3	(Kazakhstan) Kuanysh	24–26	18–25	22–25			64–76	
25 Aug	19:00	Korea Expressway (South Korea)	2–3	Vietnam	25–18	22–25	25–16	23–25	8–15	103–99	
26 Aug	19:00	Kuanysh (Kazakhstan)	0–3	(South Korea) Korea Expressway	21–25	19–25	15–25			55–75	
27 Aug	19:00	NU Lady Bulldogs (Philippines)	0–3	Vietnam	11–25	21–25	21–25			53–75	

=== Pool B ===
Pos	Team	Pld	W	L	Pts	SW	SL	SR	SPW	SPL	SPR	Qualification
1	(Russia) Korabelka	3	3	0	9	9	0	MAX	230	154	1.494	Quarterfinals
2	(China) Henan Shuanghui	3	2	1	6	6	4	1.500	238	202	1.178	Quarterfinals
3	(Japan) Aranmare Yamagata	3	1	2	3	4	6	0.667	208	239	0.870	Quarterfinals
4	(Chinese Taipei) KingWhale Taipei	3	0	3	0	0	9	0.000	146	227	0.643	Quarterfinals

Source: VTV

Date	Time		Score		Set 1	Set 2	Set 3	Set 4	Set 5	Total	Report
24 Aug	16:00	Henan Shuanghui (China)	0–3	(Russia) Korabelka	19–25	19–25	28–30			66–80	
25 Aug	14:00	Aranmare Yamagata (Japan)	3–0	(Chinese Taipei) KingWhale Taipei	26–24	26–24	25–19			77–67	
26 Aug	14:00	Henan Shuanghui (China)	3–0	(Chinese Taipei) KingWhale Taipei	25–19	25–10	25–20			75–49	
26 Aug	16:30	Korabelka (Russia)	3–0	(Japan) Aranmare Yamagata	25–20	25–21	25–17			75–58	
27 Aug	14:00	Henan Shuanghui (China)	3–1	(Japan) Aranmare Yamagata	25–18	22–25	25–20	25–10		97–73	
27 Aug	16:30	KingWhale Taipei (Chinese Taipei)	0–3	(Russia) Korabelka	11–25	8–25	11–25			30–75	

== Final round ==
- All times are local: Indochina Time (UTC+07:00).

Quarterfinals
29 August
(South Korea) Korea Expressway	3
(Chinese Taipei) KingWhale Taipei	0
29 August
(China) Henan Shuanghui	0
Vietnam	3
29 August
(Russia) Korabelka	3
(Philippines) NU Lady Bulldogs	1
29 August
(Kazakhstan) Kuanysh	3
(Japan) Aranmare Yamagata	0

Semifinals
30 August
(South Korea) Korea Expressway	0
Vietnam	3
30 August
(Russia) Korabelka	3
(Kazakhstan) Kuanysh	1

Final
31 August
Vietnam	0
(Russia) Korabelka	3
3rd place match
31 August
(South Korea) Korea Expressway	3
(Kazakhstan) Kuanysh	1

5th–8th semifinals
30 August
(Chinese Taipei) KingWhale Taipei	3
(China) Henan Shuanghui	0
30 August
(Philippines) NU Lady Bulldogs	0
(Japan) Aranmare Yamagata	3

5th place match
31 August
(Chinese Taipei) Kingwhale Taipei	0
(Japan) Aranmare Yamagata	3
7th place match
31 August
(China) Henan Shuanghui	3
(Philippines) NU Lady Bulldogs	1

=== Quarterfinals ===
Date	Time		Score		Set 1	Set 2	Set 3	Set 4	Set 5	Total	Report
29 Aug	12:00	Korea Expressway (South Korea)	3–0	(Chinese Taipei) KingWhale Taipei	25–11	25–21	25–14			75–46	
29 Aug	14:30	Korabelka (Russia)	3–1	(Philippines) NU Lady Bulldogs	25–18	25–19	21–25	25–22		96–84	
29 Aug	17:00	Kuanysh (Kazakhstan)	3–0	(Japan) Aranmare Yamagata	25–10	25–22	28–26			78–58	
29 Aug	19:30	Henan Shuanghui (China)	0–3	Vietnam	24–26	25–27	19–25			68–78	

=== 5th–8th semifinals ===
Date	Time		Score		Set 1	Set 2	Set 3	Set 4	Set 5	Total	Report
30 Aug	12:00	NU Lady Bulldogs (Philippines)	0–3	(Japan) Aranmare Yamagata	16–25	17–25	13–25			46–75	
30 Aug	14:30	KingWhale Taipei (Chinese Taipei)	3–0	(China) Henan Shuanghui	25–19	25–22	25–20			75–61	

=== Semifinals ===
Date	Time		Score		Set 1	Set 2	Set 3	Set 4	Set 5	Total	Report
30 Aug	17:00	Korabelka (Russia)	3–1	(Kazakhstan) Kuanysh	25–15	25–21	24–26	25–21		99–83	
30 Aug	19:30	Korea Expressway (South Korea)	0–3	Vietnam	21–25	20–25	23–25			64–75	

=== 7th place match ===
Date	Time		Score		Set 1	Set 2	Set 3	Set 4	Set 5	Total	Report
31 Aug	12:00	Henan Shuanghui (China)	3–1	(Philippines) NU Lady Bulldogs	25–27	25–23	26–24	25–21		101–95	

=== 5th place match ===
Date	Time		Score		Set 1	Set 2	Set 3	Set 4	Set 5	Total	Report
31 Aug	16:00	Kingwhale Taipei (Chinese Taipei)	0–3	(Japan) Aranmare Yamagata	20–25	16–25	19–25			55–75	

=== 3rd place match ===
Date	Time		Score		Set 1	Set 2	Set 3	Set 4	Set 5	Total	Report
31 Aug	17:00	Korea Expressway (South Korea)	3–1	(Kazakhstan) Kuanysh	25–23	25–18	20–25	25–13		95–79	

=== Final ===
Date	Time		Score		Set 1	Set 2	Set 3	Set 4	Set 5	Total	Report
31 Aug	19:30	Vietnam	0–3	(Russia) Korabelka	27–29	15–25	15–25			57–79	

== Final standing ==
Rank	Team
1st place, gold medalist(s)	(Russia) Korabelka
2nd place, silver medalist(s)	Vietnam
3rd place, bronze medalist(s)	(South Korea) Korea Expressway Corporation Hi-Pass
4	(Kazakhstan) Kuanysh
5	(Japan) Aranmare Yamagata
6	(Chinese Taipei) KingWhale Taipei
7	(China) Henan Shuanghui
8	(Philippines) NU Lady Bulldogs

2024 VTV Cup champions
(Russia)
Korabelka
1st title

== Awards ==
- Most valuable player
  (Russia) Elizaveta Nesterova (Korabelka)
- Best setter
  (Russia) Anna Uknevichus (Korabelka)
- Best outside spikers
  (Kazakhstan) (Cuba) Yunieska Robles Batista (Korea Expressway)
  (Russia) Anastasia Cherniaeva (Korabelka)
- Best middle blockers
  (Russia) Aleksandra Zakharova (Korabelka)
  Nguyễn Thị Trinh (Vietnam)
- Best opposite spiker
  Nguyễn Thị Bích Tuyền (Vietnam)
- Best libero
  Nguyễn Khánh Đang (Vietnam)
- Miss VTV Cup 2024
  (Russia) Elizaveta Palshina (Korabelka)
