= 2022 FIVB Women's Volleyball Club World Championship =

International women's volleyball club competition

2022 Women's Club World Championship

Tournament details
- Host country: Turkey
- City: Antalya
- Dates: 14–18 December
- Teams: 6 (from 3 confederations)
- Venue: 1 (in 1 host city)

Final positions
- Champions: (Italy) Imoco Volley Conegliano (2nd title)
- Runners-up: (Turkey) VakıfBank İstanbul
- Third place: (Turkey) Eczacıbaşı Dynavit
- Fourth place: (Brazil) Gerdau Minas

Tournament awards
- MVP: (Sweden) Isabelle Haak
- Best Setter: (Poland) Joanna Wołosz
- Best OH: (United States) Kelsey Robinson (Brazil) Gabriela Guimarães
- Best MB: (United States) Chiaka Ogbogu (Turkey) Zehra Güneş
- Best OPP: (Sweden) Isabelle Haak
- Best Libero: (Italy) Monica De Gennaro

Tournament statistics
- Matches played: 10
- Attendance: 48,749 (4,875 per match)

The 2022 FIVB Women's Volleyball Club World Championship was the 15th edition of the tournament. It was held in Antalya, Turkey from 14 to 18 December. Six teams competed in the tournament.

== Qualification ==
Team (Confederation)	Qualified as
(Turkey) Eczacıbaşı Dynavit (CEV)	Hosts
(Brazil) Dentil Praia Clube (CSV)	2022 South American runners-up
(Brazil) Gerdau Minas (CSV)	2022 South American Champions
(Italy) Imoco Volley Conegliano (CEV)	2022 European runners-up
(Kazakhstan) Kuanysh (AVC)	2022 Asian Champions
(Turkey) VakıfBank İstanbul (CEV)	2022 European Champions

== Venue ==
All matches
Antalya, Turkey
Antalya Sports Hall
Capacity: 10,000

== Format ==
=== Preliminary round ===
Six teams divided into two pools of three teams each in a round-robin match. The top two teams of each pool advance to the semifinals.

=== Final round ===
Knockout stage. The first ranked team in Pool A plays a semifinal match against the second ranked team of Pool B, and the first ranked team of Pool B plays a semifinal match against the second ranked team of Pool A. The winners of the semifinals play for the Club World Championship title, while the runners-up play for third place in the competition.

== Pools composition ==
Pool A	Pool B
(Turkey) Eczacıbaşı Dynavit	(Turkey) VakıfBank İstanbul
(Italy) Imoco Volley Conegliano	(Brazil) Gerdau Minas
(Brazil) Dentil Praia Clube	(Kazakhstan) Kuanysh

== Pool standing procedure ==
1. Number of victories
2. Match points
3. Sets quotient
4. Points quotient
5. Result of the last match between the tied teams

Match won 3–0 or 3–1: 3 match points for the winner, 0 match points for the loser
Match won 3–2: 2 match points for the winner, 1 match point for the loser

== Preliminary round ==
- All times are Turkey Time (UTC+3:00).

=== Pool A ===
Pos	Team	Pld	W	L	Pts	SW	SL	SR	SPW	SPL	SPR	Qualification
1	(Italy) Imoco Volley Conegliano	2	2	0	6	6	1	6.000	171	147	1.163	Semifinals
2	(Turkey) Eczacıbaşı Dynavit	2	1	1	3	4	3	1.333	158	143	1.105	Semifinals
3	(Brazil) Dentil Praia Clube	2	0	2	0	0	6	0.000	111	150	0.740	

Date	Time		Score		Set 1	Set 2	Set 3	Set 4	Set 5	Total	Report
14 Dec	16:30	Eczacıbaşı Dynavit (Turkey)	3–0	(Brazil) Dentil Praia Clube	25–14	25–15	25–18			75–47	P2 Report
15 Dec	16:30	Imoco Volley Conegliano (Italy)	3–0	(Brazil) Dentil Praia Clube	25–22	25–21	25–21			75–64	P2 Report
16 Dec	16:00	Eczacıbaşı Dynavit (Turkey)	1–3	(Italy) Imoco Volley Conegliano	18–25	25–21	22–25	18–25		83–96	P2 Report

=== Pool B ===
Pos	Team	Pld	W	L	Pts	SW	SL	SR	SPW	SPL	SPR	Qualification
1	(Turkey) VakıfBank İstanbul	2	2	0	6	6	0	MAX	151	114	1.325	Semifinals
2	(Brazil) Gerdau Minas	2	1	1	3	3	3	1.000	142	123	1.154	Semifinals
3	(Kazakhstan) Kuanysh	2	0	2	0	0	6	0.000	94	150	0.627	

Date	Time		Score		Set 1	Set 2	Set 3	Set 4	Set 5	Total	Report
14 Dec	19:30	VakıfBank İstanbul (Turkey)	3–0	(Kazakhstan) Kuanysh	25–15	25–15	25–17			75–47	P2 Report
15 Dec	20:00	VakıfBank İstanbul (Turkey)	3–0	(Brazil) Gerdau Minas	25–22	26–24	25–21			76–67	P2 Report
16 Dec	19:00	Gerdau Minas (Brazil)	3–0	(Kazakhstan) Kuanysh	25–14	25–13	25–20			75–47	P2 Report

== Final round ==
- All times are Turkish Time (UTC+03:00).

Semifinals
17 December
(Italy) Conegliano	3
(Brazil) Minas	0
17 December
(Turkey) VakıfBank	3
(Turkey) Eczacıbaşı	0

Final
18 December
(Italy) Conegliano	3
(Turkey) VakıfBank	1
3rd place match
18 December
(Brazil) Minas	1
(Turkey) Eczacıbaşı	3

=== Semifinals ===
Date	Time		Score		Set 1	Set 2	Set 3	Set 4	Set 5	Total	Report
17 Dec	16:30	Imoco Volley Conegliano (Italy)	3–0	(Brazil) Gerdau Minas	25–12	25–17	25–21			75–50	P2 Report
17 Dec	20:00	VakıfBank İstanbul (Turkey)	3–0	(Turkey) Eczacıbaşı Dynavit	25–21	25–19	25–23			75–63	P2 Report

=== 3rd place match ===
Date	Time		Score		Set 1	Set 2	Set 3	Set 4	Set 5	Total	Report
18 Dec	13:00	Gerdau Minas (Brazil)	1–3	(Turkey) Eczacıbaşı Dynavit	22–25	25–23	10–25	21–25		78–98	P2 Report

=== Final ===
Date	Time		Score		Set 1	Set 2	Set 3	Set 4	Set 5	Total	Report
18 Dec	16:00	Imoco Volley Conegliano (Italy)	3–1	(Turkey) VakıfBank İstanbul	25–18	22–25	25–21	25–21		97–85	P2 Report

== Final standing ==
Rank	Team
1st place, gold medalist(s)	(Italy) Imoco Volley Conegliano
2nd place, silver medalist(s)	(Turkey) VakıfBank İstanbul
3rd place, bronze medalist(s)	(Turkey) Eczacıbaşı Dynavit
4	(Brazil) Gerdau Minas
5	(Brazil) Dentil Praia Clube
6	(Kazakhstan) Kuanysh

2022 Club World Champions

2nd title

14–woman roster	Roberta Carraro, Kathryn Plummer, Kelsey Robinson, Federica Squarcini, Robin de Kruijf, Alessia Gennari, Alexa Lea Gray, Marina Lubian, Monica De Gennaro, Isabelle Haak, Ylenia Pericati, Eleonora Furlan, Joanna Wołosz (c), Anna Bardaro
Head coach	Daniele Santarelli

== Awards ==
- Most valuable player
  Isabelle Haak (SWE)
- Best setter
  Joanna Wołosz (POL)
- Best outside spikers
  Kelsey Robinson (USA)
  Gabriela Guimarães (BRA)
- Best middle blockers
  Chiaka Ogbogu (USA)
  Zehra Güneş (TUR)
- Best opposite spiker
  Isabelle Haak (SWE)
- Best libero
  Monica De Gennaro (ITA)

== See also ==
- 2022 FIVB Volleyball Men's Club World Championship
