= 2004 VTV International Women's Volleyball Cup =

Tournament details
- Host country: Vietnam
- Dates: July 7–15, 2004
- Teams: 6
- Venue: 1 (in 1 host city)

Final positions
- Champions: (China) Nanjing (1st title)

Tournament awards
- MVP: (Kazakhstan) Yelena Pavlova

The 2004 VTV Cup Championship was the first edition of the tournament

== Pools composition ==
Vietnam (Host)
(Kazakhstan) Rahat
Australia
Thailand
(China) Nanjing
(China) Yunnan

== Preliminary round ==
Pos	Team	Pld	W	L	Pts	SW	SL	SR
1	(Kazakhstan) Rahat	5	4	1	9	14	4	3.500
2	(China) Nanjing	5	4	1	9	13	5	2.600
3	(China) Yunnan	5	3	2	8	10	11	0.909
4	Vietnam	5	3	2	8	8	11	0.727
5	Thailand	5	2	3	7	6	9	0.667
6	Australia	5	0	5	5	4	15	0.267

Date	Time		Score		Set 1	Set 2	Set 3	Set 4	Set 5	Total	Report
8 July		' Vietnam '	3–1	Australia	25–17	25–16	21–25	25–23		96–81	
8 July		Thailand	0–3	' (Kazakhstan) Rahat'	23–25	18–25	16–25			57–75	
8 July		Nanjing (China)	1–3	' (China) Yunnan'	18–25	23–25	25–20	19–25		85–95	
9 July		Rahat (Kazakhstan)	2–3	' (China) Nanjing'	–	–	–	–	-	0–0	
9 July		Vietnam	2–3	' (China) Yunnan'	19–25	18–25	25–21	27–25	11–15	100–111	
9 July		' Thailand '	3–0	Australia	25–19	25–23	28–26			78–68	
10 July		' Rahat (Kazakhstan) '	3–0	Vietnam	25–20	25–23	27–25			77–68	
10 July		' Yunnan (China) '	3–2	Australia	25–23	25–18	21–25	21–25	15–5	107–96	
10 July		' Nanjing (China) '	3–0	Thailand	25–13	25–23	25–16			75–52	
11 July		' Vietnam '	3–0	Thailand	25–21	25–20	25–18			75–59	
11 July		' Rahat (Kazakhstan) '	3–1	(China) Yunnan	–	–	–	-		0–0	
11 July		' Nanjing (China) '	3–0	Australia	–	–	–			0–0	
12 July		Vietnam	0–3	' (China) Nanjing'	13–25	16–25	22–25			51–75	
12 July		' Thailand '	3–0	(China) Yunnan	25–14	25–13	25–21			75–48	
12 July		' Rahat (Kazakhstan) '	3–0	Australia	25–16	25–23	25–21			75–60	

== Final round ==
=== 3rd place ===
Date	Time		Score		Set 1	Set 2	Set 3	Set 4	Set 5	Total	Report
15 July		Vietnam	1–3	' (China) Yunnan'	25–21	17–25	16–25	17–25		75–96	Nguồn

=== Final ===
Date	Time		Score		Set 1	Set 2	Set 3	Set 4	Set 5	Total	Report
15 July		' Nanjing (China) '	3–0	(Kazakhstan) Rahat	25–17	25–22	25–22			75–61	Nguồn

== Final standing ==
Rank	Team
1st place, gold medalist(s)	(China) Nanjing
2nd place, silver medalist(s)	(Kazakhstan) Rahat
3rd place, bronze medalist(s)	(China) Yunnan
4	Vietnam
5	Thailand
6	Australia

== Awards ==
- MVP: (Kazakhstan) Yelena Pavlova
- Best spiker: (China) Zhou Yuan
- Best blocker: (Vietnam) Nguyễn Thị Ngọc Hoa
- Best setter: (China) Bai Rui Qi
- Best server: (Australia) Tregenza Melanie
- Best digger: (Thailand) Konwika Apinyapong
- Best libero: (Kazakhstan) Kananovich Iryna
- Miss VTV Cup 2004: (Vietnam) Phạm Thị Kim Huệ
