= 2012 VTV International Women's Volleyball Cup =

International volleyball tournament

Tournament details
- Host country: Vietnam
- Dates: 14–21 July
- Teams: 8
- Venue: 1 (in 1 host city)

Tournament awards
- MVP: (North Korea) Jong Jin Sim

The 2012 VTV Cup Championship was the 9th edition of the tournament. The tournament was held in Vĩnh Yên Gymnasium, Vĩnh Phúc, Vietnam. The competition featured a mix of national teams and club sides.

== Pools composition ==
Pool A	Pool B
Vietnam (Host); South Korea; China; Australia	Kazakhstan; Thailand; North Korea; Japan

== Preliminary round ==
=== Pool A ===
Pos	Team	Pld	W	L	Pts	SW	SL	SR	SPW	SPL	SPR
1	Vietnam	3	3	0	6	9	2	4.500	241	197	1.223
2	South Korea	3	2	1	5	8	4	2.000	269	231	1.165
3	China	3	1	2	4	4	6	0.667	214	228	0.939
4	Australia	3	0	3	3	0	9	0.000	159	225	0.707

Date	Time		Score		Set 1	Set 2	Set 3	Set 4	Set 5	Total	Report
14/7	18:00	China	1–3	South Korea	17–25	25–19	23–25	20–25	–	85–94	
14/7	21:30	Vietnam	3–0	Australia	25–13	25–13	25–20	–	–	75–46	
16/7	18:00	Vietnam	3–2	South Korea	12–25	25–18	25–22	14–25	15–10	91–100	
16/7	20:00	China	3–0	Australia	25–20	25–20	25–19	–	–	75–59	75–59
18/7	18:00	Vietnam	3–0	China	25–14	25–19	25–18	–	–	75–51	
18/7	20:00	Australia	0–3	South Korea	17–25	15–25	22–25	–	–	54–75	

=== Pool B ===
Pos	Team	Pld	W	L	Pts	SW	SL	SR	SPW	SPL	SPR
1	Japan	3	2	1	5	7	4	1.750	267	234	1.141
2	North Korea	3	2	1	5	7	5	1.400	280	272	1.029
3	Kazakhstan	3	2	1	5	6	4	1.500	222	222	1.000
4	Thailand	3	0	3	3	2	9	0.222	233	274	0.850

Date	Time		Score		Set 1	Set 2	Set 3	Set 4	Set 5	Total	Report
15/7	18:00	Kazakhstan	3–0	Thailand	25–18	26–24	26–24	–	–	77–66	
15/7	20:00	Japan	1–3	North Korea	25–27	25–23	22–25	22–25	–	94–100	94–100
17/7	18:00	Kazakhstan	3–1	North Korea	25–16	25–21	17–25	25–19	–	92–81	
17/7	20:00	Japan	3–1	Thailand	25–15	25–23	23–25	25–18	–	98–81	
19/7	18:00	Kazakhstan	0–3	Japan	14–25	18–25	21–25	–	–	53–75	
19/7	20:00	North Korea	3–1	Thailand	25–21	19–25	30–28	25–12	–	99–86	

== Final round ==
=== 5th–8th semifinals ===
Date	Time		Score		Set 1	Set 2	Set 3	Set 4	Set 5	Total	Report
20/7	13:30	Jiangsu (China)	1–3	(Thailand) Nakhonnon VC	24–26	21–25	22–25	21–25	–	88–101	
20/7	16:00	Kazakhstan	3–0	Australia	25–17	25–19	25–15	–	–	75–51	

=== Semifinals ===
Date	Time		Score		Set 1	Set 2	Set 3	Set 4	Set 5	Total	Report
20/7	18:00	Vietnam	2–3	North Korea	25–19	19–25	23–25	25–23	10–15	102–107	
20/7	20:00	Japan	3–0	(South Korea) IBK	25–15	25–19	25–17	–	–	75–51	

=== 7th place ===
Date	Time		Score		Set 1	Set 2	Set 3	Set 4	Set 5	Total	Report
21/7	16:00	Jiangsu (China)	2–3	Australia	25–18	19–25	17–25	25–16	12–15	98–99	

=== 5th place ===
Date	Time		Score		Set 1	Set 2	Set 3	Set 4	Set 5	Total	Report
21/7	13:30	Nakhonnon VC (Thailand)	2–3	Kazakhstan	17–25	25–12	26–24	23–25	7–15	98–101	

=== 3rd place ===
Date	Time		Score		Set 1	Set 2	Set 3	Set 4	Set 5	Total	Report
21/7	18:00	Vietnam	2–3	(South Korea) IBK	17–25	25–20	25–21	15–25	14–16	96–107	

=== Final ===
Date	Time		Score		Set 1	Set 2	Set 3	Set 4	Set 5	Total	Report
21/7	20:00	North Korea	0–3	Japan	19–25	16–25	19–25	–	–	54–75	

== Awards ==
- MVP: (North Korea) 4.25's player Jong Jin Sim
- Best spiker: (North Korea) Jong Jin Sim
- Best blocker: (Vietnam) Nguyen Thi Ngoc Hoa
- Best server: (South Korea) Lee Hyo-hee
- Best setter: (North Korea) Min Ok Ju
- Best receiver: (Japan) Yamagishi Akane
- Best libero: (Japan) Yamagishi Akane
- Miss Volleyball: (Japan) Misaki Tanaka
