= Nguyễn Thị Ngọc Hoa =

Vietnamese volleyball player

Personal information
- Full name: Nguyễn Thị Ngọc Hoa
- Nationality: Vietnam
- Born: November 10, 1987 (age 39) Đức Hòa, Long An, Vietnam
- Height: 1.83 m (6 ft 0 in)
- Weight: 64 kg (141 lb)
- Spike: 315 cm (10 ft 4 in)
- Block: 308 cm (10 ft 1 in)

Coaching information
- Current team: (Vietnam) VTV Bình Điền Long An
- Previous teams coached
- Years: Teams
- 2025–present 2026: VTV Bình Điền Long An; Vietnam

Volleyball information
- Position: Middle blocker

Career
- Years: Team
- 2000 – 2018, 2022, 2024 – 2025: (Vietnam) VTV Bình Điền Long An
- 2013 – 2014: (Thailand) Ayutthaya A.T.C.C
- 2014 – 2017: (Thailand) Bangkok Glass VC

National team
- Years: Team
- 2003 – 2017: Vietnam
Honours
Women's volleyball
Representing Vietnam
Southeast Asian Games
Silver medal – second place	2003 Ninh Bình	Team
Silver medal – second place	2005 Bacolod	Team
Silver medal – second place	2007 Nakhon Ratchasima	Team
Silver medal – second place	2009 Vientiane	Team
Silver medal – second place	2011 Palembang	Team
Silver medal – second place	2013 Naypyidaw	Team
Silver medal – second place	2015 Singapore	Team
Bronze medal – third place	2017 Kuala Lumpur	Team

Nguyễn Thị Ngọc Hoa (born November 10, 1987, in Long An) is a Vietnamese coach and former volleyball player. She is a former captain of the Vietnam women's national volleyball team. She is later the head coach of the VTV Bình Điền Long An team and one of the assistant coaches of the Vietnam national team. In 2026, she was appointed as the head coach of the Vietnam national team for the first time in the second leg of the 2026 SEA V Cup.

== Clubs ==
Ngọc Hoa played on loan with Ayutthaya A.T.C.C for the 2013/14 season and Bangkok Glass VC from the 2014/15 season to 2016/17 season. With Bangkok Glass VC, she played the 2016 FIVB Women's Club World Championship and finishing in the seventh place.

- (Vietnam) VTV Bình Điền Long An (2000 – 2018, 2022, 2024 – 2025)
- (Thailand) Ayutthaya A.T.C.C (2013 – 2014)
- (Thailand) Bangkok Glass VC (2014 – 2017)

== Career ==
=== National teams ===
As a player

- 2003 Asian Championship — 6th Place
- 2003 SEA Games — Silver Medal
- 2005 Asian Championship — 8th Place
- 2005 SEA Games — Silver Medal
- 2006 Asian Games — 7th Place
- 2007 Asian Championship — 7th Place
- 2007 SEA Games — Silver Medal
- 2008 Asian Cup — 5th Place
- 2009 Asian Championship — 7th Place
- 2009 SEA Games — Silver Medal
- 2011 Asian Championship — 7th Place
- 2011 SEA Games — Silver Medal
- 2012 Asian Cup — 4th Place
- 2013 Asian Championship — 6th Place
- 2013 SEA Games — Silver Medal
- 2015 Asian Championship — 5th Place
- 2015 SEA Games — Silver Medal
- 2016 Asian Cup — 7th Place
- 2017 Asian Championship — 5th Place
- 2017 SEA Games — Bronze Medal

As a coach

- 2026 SEA V Cup – Second Leg — 4th Place

=== Clubs ===
As a player

- 2007 Vietnam League - Runner-up, with VTV Bình Điền Long An
- 2008 Vietnam League - 3rd Place, with VTV Bình Điền Long An
- 2009 Vietnam League - Champion, with VTV Bình Điền Long An
- 2010 Vietnam League - 3rd Place, with VTV Bình Điền Long An
- 2011 Vietnam League - Champion, with VTV Bình Điền Long An
- 2012 Vietnam League - 3rd Place, with VTV Bình Điền Long An
- 2013 Thai-Denmark Super League - 3rd Place, with Ayutthaya A.T.C.C
- 2013–14 Thailand League - 3rd Place, with Ayutthaya A.T.C.C
- 2014 Thai-Denmark Super League - Champion, with Ayutthaya A.T.C.C
- 2014 Vietnam League - Runner-up, with VTV Bình Điền Long An
- 2014–15 Thailand League - Champion, with Bangkok Glass
- 2015 Asian Club Championship - Champion, with Bangkok Glass
- 2015 Vietnam League - 3rd Place, with VTV Bình Điền Long An
- 2015–16 Thailand League - Champion, with Bangkok Glass
- 2016 Asian Club Championship - 3rd Place, with Bangkok Glass
- 2016 Vietnam League - 3rd Place, with VTV Bình Điền Long An
- 2016–17 Thailand League - Runner-up, with Bangkok Glass
- 2017 Vietnam League - Champion, with VTV Bình Điền Long An
- 2018 Vietnam League - Champion, with VTV Bình Điền Long An
- 2022 Vietnam League - 3rd Place, with VTV Bình Điền Long An
- 2024 Vietnam League - Champion, with VTV Bình Điền Long An
- 2025 AVC Champions League – Runner-up, with VTV Bình Điền Long An

As a coach

- 2025 Vietnam League - Champion, with VTV Bình Điền Long An

== Awards ==
- 2004 VTV International Cup "Best Middle Blocker"
- 2005 VTV International Cup "Best Middle Blocker"
- 2007 VTV International Cup "Best Blocker"
- 2007 VTV International Cup "Best Spiker"
- 2007 Asian Club Championship "Best Blocker"
- 2007 Asian Club Championship "Best Scorer"
- 2009 VTV International Cup "Most Valuable Player"
- 2012 VTV International Cup "Best Blocker"
- 2012 VTV International Cup "Best Spiker"
- 2013 VTV International Cup "Most Valuable Player"
- 2013–14 Thailand League "Best Middle Blocker"
- 2014 VTV International Cup "Most Valuable Player"
- 2015 VTV International Cup "Best Middle Blocker"
- 2015 Asian Club Championship "Best Middle Blocker"
- 2017 Vietnam League "Best Middle Blocker"
- 2017 Vietnam League "Most Valuable Player"
- 2017 VTV International Cup "Best Middle Blocker"
- 2018 Vietnam League "Best Middle Blocker"
