= Volleyball at the 2015 SEA Games =

- Venue: OCBC Arena Hall 3
- Dates: 10 June 2015 to 16 June 2015
- Competitors: 180 from 8 nations

Volleyball at the 2015 SEA Games was held at the OCBC Arena Hall 3, in Kallang, Singapore from 10 to 16 June 2015.

== Participating nations ==
A total of 180 athletes from eight nations competed in volleyball at the 2015 SEA Games:

- Cambodia (12)
- Indonesia (24)
- Malaysia (24)
- Myanmar (24)
- Philippines (24)
- Singapore (24)
- Thailand (24)
- Vietnam (24)

== Draw ==
The draw ceremony for the team sports was held on 15 April 2015 at Singapore City.

=== Men's ===
The teams were distributed according to their position at the 2015 Southeast Asian Games using the serpentine system for their distribution.

Group A

- Thailand
- Malaysia
- Philippines
- Myanmar

Group B

- Cambodia
- Vietnam
- Indonesia
- Singapore (Host)

=== Women's ===
The teams were distributed according to their position at the 2015 Southeast Asian Games using the serpentine system for their distribution.

Group A

- Singapore (Host)
- Thailand
- Myanmar

Group B

- Vietnam
- Indonesia
- Philippines
- Malaysia

== Medalists ==
Event	Gold	Silver	Bronze
Men	Thailand	Vietnam	Indonesia Myanmar
Women	Thailand	Vietnam	Indonesia Singapore

== Medal table ==
* Host nation (Singapore)

Rank	Nation	Gold	Silver	Bronze	Total
1	Thailand (THA)	2	0	0	2
2	Vietnam (VIE)	0	2	0	2
3	Indonesia (INA)	0	0	2	2
4	Myanmar (MYA)	0	0	1	1
4	Singapore (SIN)*	0	0	1	1
Totals (5 entries)		2	2	4	8

== Final standing ==
=== Men ===
Men at the 2015 Asian Games
- Venue: OCBC Arena Hall 2
- Date: 10 – 16 June
- Nations: 8

The 2015 men's volleyball tournament was the 28th edition of the event. It was held in OCBC Arena Hall 2, Singapore from 10 to 16 June 2015.

==== Squads ====
Cambodia	Malaysia	Myanmar	Indonesia
Piseth Nou; Samnang Chamroeun; Rom Mon; Chan Tha Kol; Vesna Meas; Dara Mon; Vutha Ath; Pisey Hang; Chanthol Poch; Phearin Khoeum; Sok Veasna Seng; Rado Mak	Tiong Ching Huang; Kah Lim Soh; Kian Hui Liew; Long Mohd Shazwadi Long Salleh; Ruzaimi Ikram Mohd; Leong Siang Lim; Chien Bin Tay; Chia You Jing Chia; Jia Meng Cheoh; Jian Qin Sim; Pin Siang Goh; Kent Bin Yap	Nay Lin Aung; Kyaw Kyaw Htway; Myo Min Oo; Win Tun Oo; Khwe Char Maung; Min Kyaw Thu; Do Mae Ni Ko; Aung Thu; Zaw Myo; Zaw Win Hlaing; Aung Myat Tun; Thwin Htoo Zin	Agung Seganti; Antho Bertiyawan; Mahfud Nurcahyadi; I Komang Suarnata; Samsul Kohar; Rendy Febriant Tamamilang; I Putu Randu Wahyu Pradana; Rivan Nurmulki; Sigit Ardian; I Kadek Juliadi; Veleg Dhany Ristan Kurniawan; Aji Maulana
Singapore	Philippines	Thailand	Vietnam
Zi Hao Kingsley Tay; Long Javier Poon; Ker Han Ronald Goh; Wei Jie Benjamin Choo; Wei Zhi Wong; Yue Xuan Jordan Toh; Jie Liang Lim; Daryl Yi Rong Lee; Sin Hau Eng; Wen Chuan Edward Lai; Xuan Zheng Lim; Teng Kuan Melvin Goh	Andre Joseph Pareja; Joshua Alexis Miguel Villanueva; Kheeno Franco; Edward Camposano; Marck Jesus Espejo; John Vic de Guzman; Rex Emmanuel Intal; Ysrael Wilson Marasigan; Sandy Domenick Montero; Esmilzo Joner Polvorosa; Timothy Sto. Tomas; Peter Den Mar Torres	Jirayu Raksakaew; Montri Vaenpradab; Yossapol Wattana; Kissada Nilsawai; Khanit Sinlapasorn; Kittikun Sriutthawong; Kittinon Namkhunthod; Kitsada Somkane; Teerasak Nakprasong; Saranchit Charoensuk; Montri Puanglib; Kitsada Chanchai	Nguyễn Xuân Thành; Giang Văn Đức; Nguyễn Hoàng Thương; Nguyễn Công Chiến; Đặng Long Kiếm; Lê Hoài Hận; Lê Quang Khánh; Vũ Hồng Quân; Nguyễn Văn Dữ; Nguyễn Vũ Hoàng; Nguyễn Văn Sang; Nguyễn Hữu Hà; Từ Thanh Thuận

==== Results ====
All times are Singapore Standard Time (UTC+08:00)

===== Preliminary round =====
====== Group A ======
Pos	Team	Pld	W	L	Pts	SW	SL	SR	SPW	SPL	SPR	Qualification
1	Thailand	3	3	0	9	9	1	9.000	252	183	1.377	Semi-finals
2	Myanmar	3	2	1	6	6	3	2.000	219	201	1.090	Semi-finals
3	Philippines	3	1	2	3	3	7	0.429	206	243	0.848	
4	Malaysia	3	0	3	0	2	9	0.222	218	268	0.813	

Source: Seagames 2015

Date	Time		Score		Set 1	Set 2	Set 3	Set 4	Set 5	Total	Report
10 Jun	15:00	Malaysia	1–3	Philippines	25–20	23–25	18–25	19–25		85–95	Report
10 Jun	17:00	Thailand	3–0	Myanmar	29–27	25–16	25–18			79–61	79–61
11 Jun	17:00	Myanmar	3–0	Philippines	25–16	25–14	33–31			83–61	83–61
12 Jun	15:00	Thailand	3–1	Malaysia	23–25	25–15	25–20	25–12		98–72	Report
13 Jun	15:00	Malaysia	0–3	Myanmar	17–25	23–25	21–25			61–75	Report
14 Jun	10:00	Philippines	0–3	Thailand	21–25	16–25	13–25			50–75	Report

====== Group B ======
Pos	Team	Pld	W	L	Pts	SW	SL	SR	SPW	SPL	SPR	Qualification
1	Vietnam	3	3	0	9	9	0	MAX	225	170	1.324	Semi-finals
2	Indonesia	3	2	1	6	6	3	2.000	211	179	1.179	Semi-finals
3	Cambodia	3	1	2	3	3	7	0.429	190	208	0.913	
4	Singapore (H)	3	0	3	0	2	9	0.222	156	225	0.693	

Source: Seagames 2015
(H) Host

Date	Time		Score		Set 1	Set 2	Set 3	Set 4	Set 5	Total	Report
10 Jun	19:00	Cambodia	3–0	Singapore	25–19	25–23	25–16			75–58	Report
11 Jun	19:00	Vietnam	3–0	Indonesia	25–23	25–23	25–15			75–61	Report
12 Jun	17:00	Cambodia	0–3	Vietnam	14–25	22–25	18–25			54–75	54–75
12 Jun	19:00	Singapore	0–3	Indonesia	14–25	14–25	15–25			43–75	43–75
13 Jun	17:00	Vietnam	3–0	Singapore	25–17	25–18	25–20			75–55	75–55
14 Jun	12:00	Indonesia	3–0	Cambodia	25–21	25–20	25–20			75–61	75–61

===== Final round =====
Semi-finals
15 June – OCBC Arena Hall 2
Thailand	3
Indonesia	0
15 June – OCBC Arena Hall 2
Vietnam	3
Myanmar	0

Final
16 June – OCBC Arena Hall 2
Thailand	3
Vietnam	0

====== Semifinals ======
Date	Time		Score		Set 1	Set 2	Set 3	Set 4	Set 5	Total	Report
15 Jun	12:00	Thailand	3–0	Indonesia	25–18	25–23	25–16			75–57	Report
15 Jun	14:00	Vietnam	3–0	Myanmar	25–21	25–17	25–21			75–59	Report

====== Gold medal match ======
Date	Time		Score		Set 1	Set 2	Set 3	Set 4	Set 5	Total	Report
16 Jun	10:00	Thailand	3–0	Vietnam	25–20	25–19	25–23			75–62	Report

==== Final standing ====
Rank	Team
1st place, gold medalist(s)	Thailand
2nd place, silver medalist(s)	Vietnam
3rd place, bronze medalist(s)	Indonesia
3rd place, bronze medalist(s)	Myanmar
5	Cambodia
6	Philippines
7	Malaysia
8	Singapore

=== Women ===
Women at the 2015 SEA Games
- Venue: OCBC Arena Hall 2
- Date: 10 – 15 June
- Nations: 7

Medalists
gold medal	Thailand
silver medal	Vietnam

The 2015 women's volleyball tournament was the 28th edition of the event. It was held in OCBC Arena Hall 2, Singapore from 10 to 15 June 2015. Thailand defeated Vietnam to claim the gold medal.

==== Squads ====
Malaysia	Myanmar	Indonesia	Singapore
Sea Theng Kuck; Ariffin Nuraini; Lee Geok Ting Elaine; Shun Thing Beh; Mei Cing Low; Teck Hua Luk; Teck Eng Luk; Lee Jay See Jessie; Woon Chian Wen Mandy; Lim Wing Yi Winnie; Shu Woon Joo; Ang Faith En Cherise	Phyu Thwe Soe; Ohmar Than; Nilar Aye; Thandar Khaing; San San Htay; Moe Moe San; Cho Cho Win; Thi Thi Aung; Khin Thet Wai; Zar Zar Hlaing; Aye Nandar Mhint; Htet Htet Lin	Nandita Ayu Salsabila; Tri Retno Mutiara Lutfi; Novriali Yami; Amalia Fajrina Nabila; Komang Bumi Rekta; Aprilia Santini Manganang; Wilda Siti Sugandi; Asih Titi Pangestuti; Yolla Yuliana; Dewi Wulandari; Maya Kurnia Indri Sari; Novia Andriyanti	Hui Qing Ethel Kang; Hui Min Michelle Tan; Zhen Jolly Chan; Qian Lin Marylyn Yeo; Soo Teng Quek; Cassandra Hwee Min Tay; Chien Wen Lim; Shu Yu Joelle Lim; Hui Tien Lim; Ching Yi Grace Seet; Hui Yi Cecilia Vanessa Ong; Chien Lenis Phoa
Philippines	Thailand	Vietnam	
Rhea Dimaculangan; Alyssa Valdez; Jaja Santiago; Grethcel Soltones; Abigail Maraño; Jovelyn Gonzaga; Maika Ortiz; Dennise Michelle Lazaro; Julia Melissa Morado; Dindin Santiago-Manabat; Rachel Daquis	Wanna Buakaew; Piyanut Pannoy; Pleumjit Thinkaow; Onuma Sittirak; Hattaya Bamrungsuk; Pimpichaya Kokram; Chatchu-on Moksri; Wilavan Apinyapong; Pornpun Guedpard; Nootsara Tomkom; Ajcharaporn Kongyot	Trần Thị Thanh Thúy; Lê Thị Hồng; Đinh Thị Trà Giang; Hà Ngọc Diễm; Đỗ Thị Minh; Nguyễn Thị Ngọc Hoa; Nguyễn Linh Chi; Nguyễn Thị Hồng Đào; Phạm Thị Liên; Bùi Thị Ngà; Lê Thanh Thúy	

==== Results ====
All times are Singapore Standard Time (UTC+08:00)

===== Preliminary round =====
====== Group A ======
Pos	Team	Pld	W	L	Pts	SW	SL	SR	SPW	SPL	SPR	Qualification
1	Thailand	2	2	0	6	6	0	MAX	150	60	2.500	Semi-finals
2	Singapore (H)	2	1	1	2	3	5	0.600	137	170	0.806	Semi-finals
3	Myanmar	2	0	2	1	2	6	0.333	120	177	0.678	

Source: Seagames 2015
(H) Host

Date	Time		Score		Set 1	Set 2	Set 3	Set 4	Set 5	Total	Report
11 Jun	14:00	Thailand	3–0	Myanmar	25–8	25–11	25–6			75–25	75–25
12 Jun	12:00	Singapore	0–3	Thailand	6–25	15–25	14–25			35–75	Report
13 Jun	12:00	Myanmar	2–3	Singapore	25–21	25–16	17–25	18–25	10–15	95–102	Report

====== Group B ======
Pos	Team	Pld	W	L	Pts	SW	SL	SR	SPW	SPL	SPR	Qualification
1	Vietnam	3	3	0	8	9	2	4.500	252	200	1.260	Semi-finals
2	Indonesia	3	2	1	7	8	3	2.667	250	204	1.225	Semi-finals
3	Philippines	3	1	2	3	3	6	0.500	191	199	0.960	
4	Malaysia	3	0	3	0	0	9	0.000	135	225	0.600	

Source: Seagames 2015

Date	Time		Score		Set 1	Set 2	Set 3	Set 4	Set 5	Total	Report
10 Jun	10:00	Vietnam	3–0	Malaysia	25–10	25–15	25–15			75–40	Report
10 Jun	12:00	Indonesia	3–0	Philippines	25–22	25–20	25–14			75–56	Report
11 Jun	10:00	Malaysia	0–3	Philippines	15–25	18–25	16–25			49–75	49–75
11 Jun	12:00	Vietnam	3–2	Indonesia	25–20	25–20	21–25	16–25	15–10	102–100	102–100
12 Jun	10:00	Indonesia	3–0	Malaysia	25–13	25–23	25–10			75–46	75–46
13 Jun	10:00	Philippines	0–3	Vietnam	16–25	21–25	23–25			60–75	Report

===== Final round =====
Semi-finals
14 June – OCBC Arena Hall 2
Thailand	3
Indonesia	1
14 June – OCBC Arena Hall 2
Vietnam	3
Singapore	0

Final
15 June – OCBC Arena Hall 2
Thailand	3
Vietnam	0

====== Semifinals ======
Date	Time		Score		Set 1	Set 2	Set 3	Set 4	Set 5	Total	Report
14 Jun	15:00	Thailand	3–1	Indonesia	21–25	25–13	25–23	25–13		96–74	Report
14 Jun	17:00	Vietnam	3–0	Singapore	25–17	25–12	25–14			75–43	Report

====== Gold medal match ======
Date	Time		Score		Set 1	Set 2	Set 3	Set 4	Set 5	Total	Report
15 Jun	17:00	Thailand	3–0	Vietnam	25–18	25–18	25–15			75–51	Report

==== Final standing ====
Rank	Team
1st place, gold medalist(s)	Thailand
2nd place, silver medalist(s)	Vietnam
3rd place, bronze medalist(s)	Indonesia
3rd place, bronze medalist(s)	Singapore
5	Philippines
6	Myanmar
7	Malaysia
