= 2016 VTV International Women's Volleyball Cup =

Tournament details
- Host country: Vietnam
- Dates: October 8–October 15
- Teams: 6
- Venue: 1 (in 1 host city)

Final positions
- Champions: Supreme Chonburi (1st title)

The 2016 VTV Cup Championship was the 13th staging of the international tournament. The tournament was held at the Hà Nam Gymnasium in Hà Nam, Vietnam.

== Pool composition ==
6 teams were set to participate at the tournament.

- Vietnam (hosts)
- China U18
- (China) Tangzhang Middle School
- (Japan) Chinzei Gakuin High School
- (Thailand) Supreme Chonburi
- Indonesia

== Preliminary round ==
Pos	Team	Pld	W	L	Pts	SW	SL	SR	SPW	SPL	SPR	Qualification
1	(Thailand) Supreme Chonburi	5	5	0	15	15	0	MAX	375	229	1.638	Semifinals
2	Vietnam	5	4	1	12	12	4	3.000	377	285	1.323	Semifinals
3	China U18	5	3	2	8	10	8	1.250	368	371	0.992	Semifinals
4	Indonesia	5	2	3	7	8	9	0.889	361	344	1.049	Semifinals
5	(Japan) Chinzei Gakuin High School	5	1	4	2	3	14	0.214	294	400	0.735	
6	(China) Tangzhang Middle School	5	0	5	1	2	15	0.133	266	412	0.646	

Date	Time		Score		Set 1	Set 2	Set 3	Set 4	Set 5	Total	Report
8 Oct	15:00	Supreme Chonburi (Thailand)	3–0	China U18	25–18	25–12	25–12			75–42	
8 Oct	17:00	Chinzei Gakuin High School (Japan)	0–3	Indonesia	8–25	20–25	16–25			44–75	
8 Oct	19:30	Vietnam	3–0	(China) Tangzhang Middle School	25–12	25–7	25–21			75–40	

Date	Time		Score		Set 1	Set 2	Set 3	Set 4	Set 5	Total	Report
9 Oct	15:30	Supreme Chonburi (Thailand)	3–0	Indonesia	25–20	25–20	25–17			75–57	
9 Oct	17:30	China U18	3–0	(China) Tangzhang Middle School	25–15	25–19	25–13			75–47	
9 Oct	20:00	Chinzei Gakuin High School (Japan)	0–3	Vietnam	18–25	12–25	23–25			53–75	

Date	Time		Score		Set 1	Set 2	Set 3	Set 4	Set 5	Total	Report
10 Oct	15:30	Supreme Chonburi (Thailand)	3–0	(China) Tangzhang Middle School	25–12	25–12	25–12			75–36	
10 Oct	17:30	Chinzei Gakuin High School (Japan)	0–3	China U18	18–25	21–25	10–25			49–75	
10 Oct	20:00	Indonesia	0–3	Vietnam	16–25	13–25	19–25			48–75	

Date	Time		Score		Set 1	Set 2	Set 3	Set 4	Set 5	Total	Report
11 Oct	15:30	Tangzhang Middle School (China)	2–3	(Japan) Chinzei Gakuin High School	26–24	19–25	23–25	25–23	7–15	100–112	
11 Oct	17:30	Indonesia	2–3	China U18	25–19	20–25	25–23	23–25	13–15	106–107	
11 Oct	20:00	Supreme Chonburi (Thailand)	3–0	Vietnam	25–21	25–14	25–23			75–58	

Date	Time		Score		Set 1	Set 2	Set 3	Set 4	Set 5	Total	Report
12 Oct	15:30	Tangzhang Middle School (China)	0–3	Indonesia	14–25	11–25	18–25			43–75	
12 Oct	17:30	Supreme Chonburi (Thailand)	3–0	(Japan) Chinzei Gakuin High School	25–12	25–12	25–12			75–36	
12 Oct	20:00	Vietnam	3–1	China U18	19–25	25–13	25–12	25–19		94–69	

Fixtures: Thể Thao Việt Nam

== Final round ==
Semifinals
14 Oct – Ha Nam
Vietnam	3
China U18	0
14 Oct – Ha Nam
(Thailand) Supreme Chonburi	3
Indonesia	0

Final
15 Oct – Ha Nam
Vietnam	0
(Thailand) Supreme Chonburi	3
3rd place
15 Oct – Ha Nam
China U18	0
Indonesia	3

=== Semifinals ===
Date	Time		Score		Set 1	Set 2	Set 3	Set 4	Set 5	Total	Report
14 Oct	17:30	Supreme Chonburi (Thailand)	3–0	Indonesia	25–18	25–18	25–22			75–58	
14 Oct	20:00	Vietnam	3–0	China U18	25–13	25–18	25–9			75–40	

=== 5th place ===
Date	Time		Score		Set 1	Set 2	Set 3	Set 4	Set 5	Total	Report
14 Oct	15:30	Chinzei Gakuin High School (Japan)	3–0	(China) Tangzhang Middle School	25–16	25–21	25–21			75–58	

=== 3rd place ===
Date	Time		Score		Set 1	Set 2	Set 3	Set 4	Set 5	Total	Report
15 Oct	17:30	China U18	0–3	Indonesia	16–25	19–25	15–25			50–75	

=== Final ===
Date	Time		Score		Set 1	Set 2	Set 3	Set 4	Set 5	Total	Report
15 Oct	20:50	Vietnam	0–3	(Thailand) Supreme Chonburi	20–25	18–25	10–25			48–75	

== Final standing ==
Rank	Team
1st place, gold medalist(s)	(Thailand) Supreme Chonburi
2nd place, silver medalist(s)	Vietnam
3rd place, bronze medalist(s)	Indonesia
4	China U18
5	(Japan) Chinzei Gakuin High School
6	(China) Tangzhang Middle School

2016 VTV International Women's Volleyball Cup

1st title

== Awards ==
- Most valuable player
  (Indonesia) Manganang Aprilia Santini
- Best outside spikers
  (Vietnam) Trần Thị Thanh Thuý
  (Thailand) Wilavan Apinyapong
- Best setter
  (Thailand) Soraya Phomla
- Best opposite spiker
  (Senegal) Fatou Diouck
- Best middle blockers
  (United States) Chloe Mann
  (Vietnam) Lê Thanh Thuý
- Best libero
  (Vietnam) Nguyen Thi Kim Lien
- Miss VTV Cup 2016
  (Indonesia) Nandita Ayu Salsabila
