= 2022 Asian Women's Club Volleyball Championship =

International volleyball competition

Tournament details
- Host country: Kazakhstan
- City: Semey
- Dates: 24–30 April
- Teams: 6 (from 1 confederation)
- Venue: 1 (in 1 host city)

Final positions
- Champions: (Kazakhstan) Kuanysh (1st title)
- Runners-up: (Kazakhstan) Altay
- Third place: (Thailand) Diamond Food–Fine Chef
- Fourth place: (Iran) Barij Essence

Tournament awards
- MVP: (Serbia) Aleksandra Ćirović
- Best Setter: (Serbia) Danica Radenković
- Best OH: (Kazakhstan) Sana Anarkulova (Ukraine) Karyna Denysova
- Best MB: (Kazakhstan) Kristina Anikonova (Thailand) Sasiwimol Sangpan
- Best OPP: (Kazakhstan) Tatyana Aldoshina
- Best Libero: (Kazakhstan) Sabira Bekisheva

Tournament statistics
- Matches played: 17
- Attendance: 35,270 (2,075 per match)

The 2022 Asian Women's Club Volleyball Championship was the 22nd edition of the Asian Women's Club Volleyball Championship, an annual international women's volleyball club tournament organized by the Asian Volleyball Confederation (AVC) with Kazakhstan Volleyball Federation (KVF).

The tournament was held in Semey, Kazakhstan, from 24 to 30 April 2022. The winner of the tournament qualified to 2022 FIVB Volleyball Women's Club World Championship.

== Qualification ==
Following the AVC regulations, the maximum of 16 teams in all AVC events will be selected by:

- 1 team for the host country
- 10 teams based on the final standing of the previous edition
- 5 teams from each of 5 zones (with a qualification tournament if needed)

Due to anticipated difficulty for national federations to field teams due to the COVID-19 pandemic, the AVC allowed two clubs from the same national federation to participate in the case that there are less than 8 federations enter the tournament. In the case of less than 16 entrants, the host is entitled to enter two teams. Only five national federations entered with Kazakhstan the only country to have two representative club.

=== Qualified associations ===
Event(s)		Dates	Location	Berths	Qualifier(s)
Host Country		—N/a	—N/a	1	(Kazakhstan) Kazakhstan^{A}
2021 Asian Championship		1–7 October 2021	(Thailand) Nakhon Ratchasima	3	(Kazakhstan) Kazakhstan^{A} Thailand; Iran; ~~Philippines~~^{B}
Direct zonal wildcards	East Asia	No later than 15 January 2022	(Thailand) Bangkok	0	~~Japan~~^{B}
Direct zonal wildcards	Central Asia	No later than 15 January 2022	(Thailand) Bangkok	2	Uzbekistan; Kyrgyzstan
Total				6	

^A Kazakhstan as host country is entitled to enter two teams if they are less than 16 entrants.
^B The Japan Volleyball Association decided to withdraw JT Marvelous from the Asian Club Championship due to the COVID-19 infection among their team members.

== Squads ==
=== Participating teams ===
The following teams were entered for the tournament.

Association	Team	Domestic league standing
Kazakhstan	Altay	2021–22 Kazakhstan Women's National League winners
Kazakhstan	Kuanysh	2021–22 Kazakhstan Women's National League third placers
Thailand	Diamond Food–Fine Chef	2020–21 Women's Volleyball Thailand League champions
Iran	Barij Essence	2020–21 Iran Women's Volleyball Premier League champions
Uzbekistan	Jizzakh State Pedagogical Institute	
Kyrgyzstan	Kyrgyzstan	Kyrgyzstan National Youth League

== Venues ==
The tournament was hosted in Abay Arena Cultural and Sports Complex, located in Semey, East Kazakhstan.

All rounds
Semey, Kazakhstan
Abay Arena Cultural and Sports Complex
Capacity: 5,000

== Pool standing procedure ==
1. Total number of victories (matches won, matches lost)
2. In the event of a tie, the following first tiebreaker will apply: The teams will be ranked by the most point gained per match as follows:
  - Match won 3–0 or 3–1: 3 points for the winner, 0 points for the loser
  - Match won 3–2: 2 points for the winner, 1 point for the loser
  - Match forfeited: 3 points for the winner, 0 points (0–25, 0–25, 0–25) for the loser
3. If teams are still tied after examining the number of victories and points gained, then the AVC will examine the results in order to break the tie in the following order:
  - Set quotient: if two or more teams are tied on the number of points gained, they will be ranked by the quotient resulting from the division of the number of all set won by the number of all sets lost.
  - Points quotient: if the tie persists based on the set quotient, the teams will be ranked by the quotient resulting from the division of all points scored by the total of points lost during all sets.
  - If the tie persists based on the point quotient, the tie will be broken based on the team that won the match of the Round Robin Phase between the tied teams. When the tie in point quotient is between three or more teams, these teams ranked taking into consideration only the matches involving the teams in question.

== Preliminary round ==
- All times are in Kazakhstan Standard Time (UTC+06:00).

Pos	Team	Pld	W	L	Pts	SW	SL	SR	SPW	SPL	SPR	Qualification
1	(Kazakhstan) Altay	5	5	0	15	15	1	15.000	396	320	1.238	Final
2	(Kazakhstan) Kuanysh	5	4	1	12	13	4	3.250	413	291	1.419	Final
3	(Thailand) Diamond Food–Fine Chef	5	3	2	9	10	6	1.667	375	303	1.238	3rd place match
4	(Iran) Barij Essence	5	2	3	6	6	9	0.667	292	311	0.939	3rd place match
5	(Uzbekistan) Jizzakh State Pedagogical Institute	5	1	4	3	3	13	0.231	208	380	0.547	
6	Kyrgyzstan	5	0	5	0	1	15	0.067	205	387	0.530	

Date	Time		Score		Set 1	Set 2	Set 3	Set 4	Set 5	Total	Report
24 Apr	11:00	Jizzakh State Pedagogical Institute (Uzbekistan)	0–3	(Thailand) Diamond Food–Fine Chef	8–25	8–25	10–25			26–75	Report
24 Apr	14:00	Altay (Kazakhstan)	3–1	(Kazakhstan) Kuanysh	25–18	20–25	25–19	25–19		95–81	Report
24 Apr	17:00	Kyrgyzstan	0–3	(Iran) Barij Essence	14–25	14–25	7–25			35–75	Report
25 Apr	11:00	Diamond Food–Fine Chef (Thailand)	1–3	(Kazakhstan) Kuanysh	25–22	13–25	27–29	29–31		94–107	Report
25 Apr	14:00	Jizzakh State Pedagogical Institute (Uzbekistan)	0–3	(Iran) Barij Essence	20–25	15–25	16–25			51–75	Report
25 Apr	17:00	Altay (Kazakhstan)	3–0	Kyrgyzstan	25–9	25–5	25–13			75–27	Report
26 Apr	11:00	Barij Essence (Iran)	0–3	(Thailand) Diamond Food–Fine Chef	22–25	20–25	21–25			63–75	Report
26 Apr	14:00	Kuanysh (Kazakhstan)	3–0	Kyrgyzstan	25–12	25–8	25–12			75–32	Report
26 Apr	17:00	Jizzakh State Pedagogical Institute (Uzbekistan)	0–3	(Kazakhstan) Altay	4–25	11–25	11–25			26–75	Report
28 Apr	11:00	Diamond Food–Fine Chef (Thailand)	3–0	Kyrgyzstan	25–7	25–14	25–10			75–31	Report
28 Apr	14:00	Barij Essence (Iran)	0–3	(Kazakhstan) Altay	11–25	9–25	10–25			30–75	Report
28 Apr	17:00	Kuanysh (Kazakhstan)	3–0	(Uzbekistan) Jizzakh State Pedagogical Institute	25–4	25–6	25–8			75–18	Report
29 Apr	11:00	Altay (Kazakhstan)	3–0	(Thailand) Diamond Food–Fine Chef	25–12	25–20	26–24			76–56	Report
29 Apr	14:00	Kyrgyzstan	1–3	(Uzbekistan) Jizzakh State Pedagogical Institute	16–25	20–25	25–12	19–25		80–87	Report
29 Apr	17:00	Barij Essence (Iran)	0–3	(Kazakhstan) Kuanysh	16–25	16–25	17–25			49–75	Report

== Final round ==
- All times are in Kazakhstan Standard Time (UTC+06:00).

=== 3rd place match ===
Date	Time		Score		Set 1	Set 2	Set 3	Set 4	Set 5	Total	Report
30 Apr	11:00	Diamond Food–Fine Chef (Thailand)	3–1	(Iran) Barij Essence	20–25	25–15	25–11	25–21		95–72	Report

=== Final ===
Date	Time		Score		Set 1	Set 2	Set 3	Set 4	Set 5	Total	Report
30 Apr	14:00	Altay (Kazakhstan)	2–3	(Kazakhstan) Kuanysh	26–24	25–21	28–30	23–25	6–15	108–115	Report

== Final standing ==
Rank	Team
1st place, gold medalist(s)	(Kazakhstan) Kuanysh
2nd place, silver medalist(s)	(Kazakhstan) Altay
3rd place, bronze medalist(s)	(Thailand) Diamond Food–Fine Chef
4	(Iran) Barij Essence
5	(Uzbekistan) Jizzakh State Pedagogical Institute
6	Kyrgyzstan

Qualified for the 2022 Club World Championship

2022 Asian Women's Club Champions
(Kazakhstan)
Kuanysh
1st title

12–Women roster
Elena Samoylova, Sabira Bekisheva, Natalya Smirnova, Ekaterina Mikhailova, Karyna Denysova, Tatyana Aldoshina, Yana Petrenko, Aleksandra Ćirović, Margarita Belchenko, Anastassiya Kolomoets, Nailya Nigmatulina, Kristina Shvidkaya
Head coach
(Serbia) Dobreskov Darko

== Awards ==
- Most Valuable Player

Aleksandra Ćirović (SRB) (Kuanysh)

- Best Setter

Danica Radenković (SRB) (Altay)

- Best Outside Spikers

Sana Anarkulova (KAZ) (Altay)
Karyna Denysova (UKR) (Kuanysh)

- Best Middle Blockers

Kristina Anikonova (KAZ) (Altay)
Sasiwimol Sangpan (THA) (Diamond Food–Fine Chef)

- Best Opposite Spiker

Tatyana Aldoshina (KAZ) (Kuanysh)

- Best Libero

Sabira Bekisheva (KAZ) (Kuanysh)

== See also ==
- 2022 Asian Men's Club Volleyball Championship
