= Phạm Thị Yến =

Vietnamese volleyball player (born 1985)

Personal information
- Full name: Phạm Thị Yến
- Born: October 20, 1985; Hà Nam, Vietnam
- Height: 1.78 m (5 ft 10 in)
- Weight: 73 kg (161 lb)
- Spike: 307 cm (121 in)
- Block: 300 cm (120 in)

Volleyball information
- Position: Opposite
- Current club: Thong Tin Lien Viet
- Number: 7

Phạm Thị Yến (born October 20, 1985) is a member of the Vietnam women's national volleyball team.
