= 2019 VTV International Women's Volleyball Cup =

Tournament details
- Host country: Vietnam
- Dates: 3–10 August
- Teams: 7
- Venue: 1 (in 1 host city)

Final positions
- Champions: (Japan) NEC Red Rockets (1st title)
- Runners-up: Vietnam
- Third place: North Korea
- Fourth place: (China) Fujian

Tournament awards
- MVP: (Japan) Mizuki Yanagita

Tournament statistics
- Matches played: 17

The 2019 VTV Cup is the 16th staging of the international tournament. The tournament was held in Quảng Nam, Vietnam.

== Pool composition ==
Pool A	Pool B
Vietnam (Host); Chinese Taipei (Kazakhstan) Altay VC	Australia; North Korea (China) Fujian (Japan) NEC Red Rockets

== Preliminary round ==
- All times are local: Vietnam Standard Time (UTC+07:00).

=== Group A ===
Pos	Team	Pld	W	L	Pts	SW	SL	SR	SPW	SPL	SPR	Qualification
1	Vietnam	2	2	0	6	6	0	MAX	150	89	1.685	Semifinals
2	Chinese Taipei	2	1	1	3	3	3	1.000	126	139	0.906	Quarterfinals
3	(Kazakhstan) Altay VC	2	0	2	0	0	6	0.000	102	150	0.680	Quarterfinals

Date	Time		Score		Set 1	Set 2	Set 3	Set 4	Set 5	Total	Report
3 Aug	20:00	Vietnam	3–0	Chinese Taipei	25–14	25–17	25–20			75–51	
4 Aug	19:00	Chinese Taipei	3–0	(Kazakhstan) Altay VC	25–19	25–23	25–22			75–64	
5 Aug	19:00	Vietnam	3–0	(Kazakhstan) Altay VC	25–14	25–11	25–13			75–38	

=== Group B ===
Pos	Team	Pld	W	L	Pts	SW	SL	SR	SPW	SPL	SPR	Qualification
1	(Japan) NEC Red Rockets	3	3	0	8	9	2	4.500	260	203	1.281	Semifinals
2	North Korea	3	2	1	7	8	3	2.667	260	191	1.361	Quarterfinals
3	(China) Fujian	3	1	2	3	3	7	0.429	189	235	0.804	Quarterfinals
4	Australia	3	0	3	0	1	9	0.111	163	243	0.671	6th place match

Date	Time		Score		Set 1	Set 2	Set 3	Set 4	Set 5	Total	Report
3 Aug	17:30	NEC Red Rockets (Japan)	3–0	Australia	25–13	25–17	25–9			75–39	
4 Aug	17:00	North Korea	3–0	(China) Fujian	25–11	25–16	25–15			75–42	
5 Aug	15:00	NEC Red Rockets (Japan)	3–0	(China) Fujian	25–18	25–16	25–20			75–54	
5 Aug	17:00	Australia	0–3	North Korea	19–25	10–25	10–25			39–75	
6 Aug	17:00	Fujian (China)	3–1	Australia	25–22	18–25	25–18	25–20		93–85	
6 Aug	19:00	NEC Red Rockets (Japan)	3–2	North Korea	25–27	19–25	25–23	25–21	16–14	110–110	

== Final round ==
- All times are local: Vietnam Standard Time (UTC+07:00).

=== Final six ===
Quarterfinals
8 August
North Korea	3
(Kazakhstan) Altay VC	0
8 August
Chinese Taipei	0
(China) Fujian	3

Semifinals
9 August
Vietnam	3
North Korea	2
9 August
(Japan) NEC Red Rockets	3
(China) Fujian	0

Final
10 August
Vietnam	1
(Japan) NEC Red Rockets	3
3rd place
10 August
North Korea	3
(China) Fujian	0

5th place
9 August
Chinese Taipei	3
(Kazakhstan) Altay VC	0

6th place
10 August
Australia	3
(Kazakhstan) Altay VC	0

=== Quarterfinals ===
Date	Time		Score		Set 1	Set 2	Set 3	Set 4	Set 5	Total	Report
8 Aug	17:00	Chinese Taipei	0–3	(China) Fujian	20–25	14–25	10–25			44–75	
8 Aug	19:00	North Korea	3–0	(Kazakhstan) Altay VC	25–10	25–12	25–15			75–37	

=== Semifinals ===
Date	Time		Score		Set 1	Set 2	Set 3	Set 4	Set 5	Total	Report
9 Aug	17:00	NEC Red Rockets (Japan)	3–0	(China) Fujian	25–22	25–11	25–19			75–52	
9 Aug	19:00	Vietnam	3–2	North Korea	19–25	22–25	25–23	25–23	15–12	106–108	

=== 6th place ===
Date	Time		Score		Set 1	Set 2	Set 3	Set 4	Set 5	Total	Report
10 Aug	16:00	Australia	3–0	(Kazakhstan) Altay VC	25–22	25–22	25–17			75–61	

=== 5th place ===
Date	Time		Score		Set 1	Set 2	Set 3	Set 4	Set 5	Total	Report
9 Aug	15:00	Chinese Taipei	3–0	(Kazakhstan) Altay VC	25–17	25–22	25–20			75–59	

=== 3rd place ===
Date	Time		Score		Set 1	Set 2	Set 3	Set 4	Set 5	Total	Report
10 Aug	18:00	North Korea	3–0	(China) Fujian	27–25	25–21	25–15			77–61	

=== Final ===
Date	Time		Score		Set 1	Set 2	Set 3	Set 4	Set 5	Total	Report
10 Aug	20:00	Vietnam	1–3	(Japan) NEC Red Rockets	29–27	17–25	17–25	16–25		79–102	

== Final standing ==
Rank	Team
1st place, gold medalist(s)	(Japan) NEC Red Rockets
2nd place, silver medalist(s)	Vietnam
3rd place, bronze medalist(s)	North Korea
4	(China) Fujian
5	Chinese Taipei
6	Australia
7	(Kazakhstan) Altay VC

2019 VTV International Women's Volleyball Cup

1st title

== Awards ==
- Most valuable player
  (Japan) Mizuki Yanagita
- Best outside spikers
  (North Korea) Kim Hyon-ju
  (North Korea) Jong Jin-sim
- Best setter
  (Japan) Shiori Tsukada
- Best opposite spiker
  (Vietnam) Đặng Thị Kim Thanh
- Best middle blockers
  (Vietnam) Bùi Thị Ngà
  (Japan) Shiori Aratani
- Best libero
  (Japan) Manami Kojima
- Miss VTV Cup 2019
  (Kazakhstan) Dinara Syzdykova
