= Chiaka Ogbogu =

American volleyball player (born 1995)

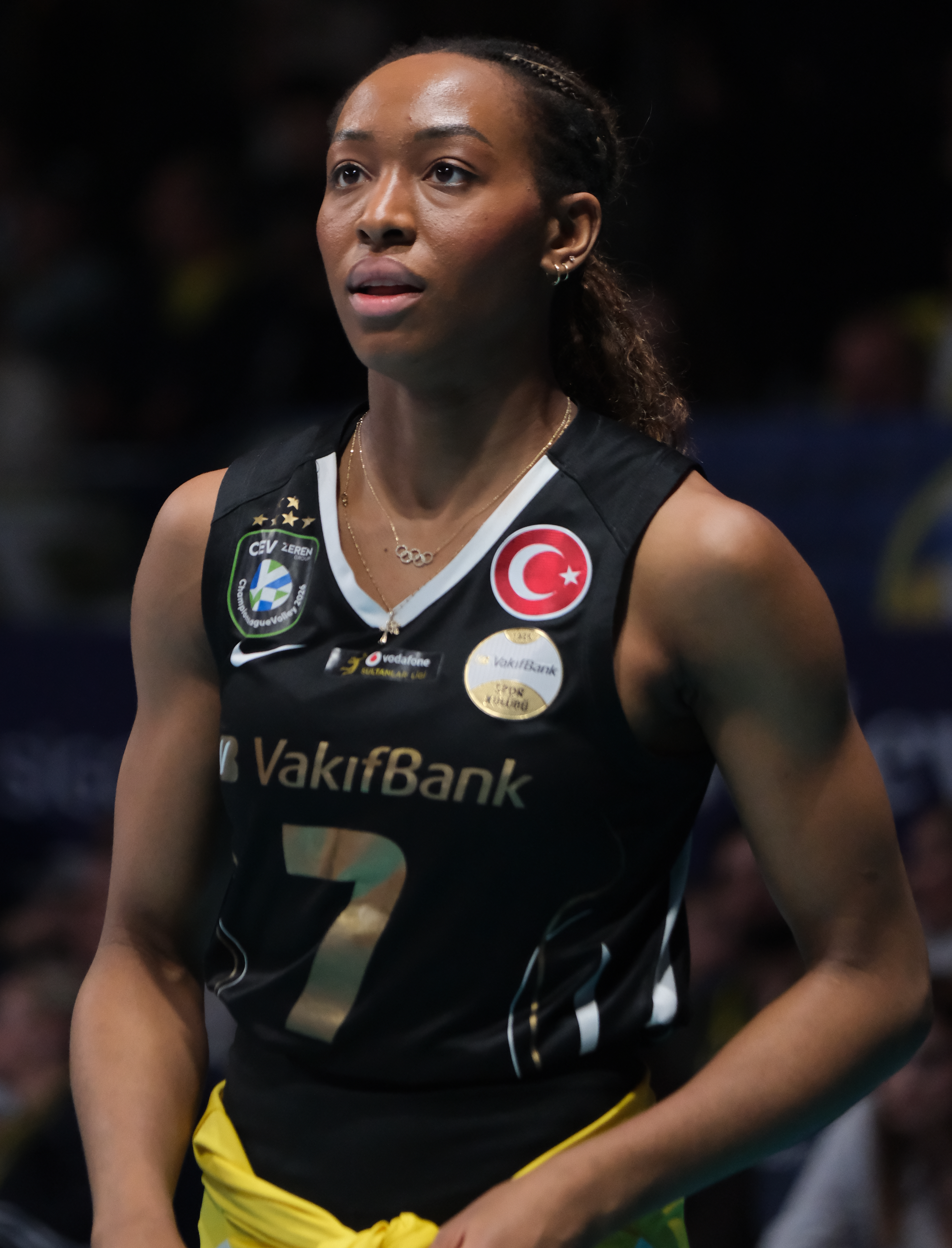
- Ogbogu in 2026

Personal information
- Full name: Chiaka Sylvia Ogbogu
- Nationality: American
- Born: April 15, 1995 (age 31); Newark, New Jersey, U.S.
- Hometown: Coppell, Texas, U.S.
- Height: 6 ft 1 in (1.85 m)
- Weight: 161 lb (73 kg)
- Spike: 125 in (318 cm)
- Block: 121 in (307 cm)
- Education: University of Texas

Volleyball information
- Position: Middle blocker
- Current club: (Turkey) Fenerbahçe
- Number: 24 (national team)

National team
| United States |
Medal record
Women's volleyball
Representing the United States
Olympic Games
| Gold medal – first place | 2020 Tokyo | Team |
| Silver medal – second place | 2024 Paris | Team |
World Cup
| Silver medal – second place | 2019 Japan | Team |
FIVB Nations League
| Gold medal – first place | 2018 Nanjing | Team |
| Gold medal – first place | 2019 Nanjing | Team |
| Gold medal – first place | 2021 Rimini | Team |
Pan-American Cup
| Gold medal – first place | 2018 Santo Domingo |

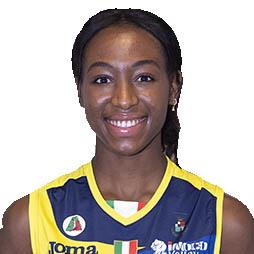
Ogbogu in 2018

Chiaka Sylvia Ogbogu (/tʃiˈɑːkə oʊˈbɒɡuː/ chee-AH-kə oh-BOG-oo; born April 15, 1995) is an American professional volleyball player. As a member of the United States women's volleyball team she has earned titles at multiple international competitions, including a gold medal at the 2020 Summer Olympics and a silver medal at the 2024 Summer Olympics.

== Early life ==
Ogbogu was born in 1995 in New Jersey to Igbo parents. Her family moved to Dallas shortly after she was born. She began playing volleyball in middle school. She led Coppell High School to two straight volleyball Texas state championships in 2011 and 2012 and was a Gatorade Texas Player of the Year in 2012.

Ogbogu attended University of Texas at Austin, where she was a four-time AVCA All-American and the 2017 Big 12 Player of the Year. At the time of her graduation, Ogbogu held the university's record in career blocks.

== Career ==
=== National team ===
Ogbogu has been part of the United States national team since 2018, when she debuted at the 2018 Pan American Cup and won gold. In the finals against Dominican Republic, she scored seven of the team's 17 blocks and was the second highest scorer on the team with 21 points overall.

In 2019, Ogbogu earned gold at the Volleyball Nations League with the national team. Ogbogu and the team again won gold at the next edition of the games in 2021. That year, she was named to the 12-player Olympic roster that would compete in the 2020 Summer Olympics in Tokyo. The team won Team USA its first-ever Olympic gold medal.

At the 2024 Summer Olympics in Paris, Ogbogu was a starting middle blocker for all six of Team USA's matches. She earned silver with the team and was the only Team USA player named to the Paris Dream Team, earning the award for Best Middle Blocker. She was the second-highest scoring blocker of the Paris games with 21 blocks, averaging 3.50 blocks per match. During a pool play match against Serbia, Ogbogu scored eight blocks, tying the Olympic record for most blocks in a match.

=== Club ===
Ogbogu began her professional career in playing in Italy for Il Bisonte Firenze in 2017. She then joined the Polish club Chemik Police for the 2018–2019 season, before returning to Italy to play for Imoco Volley Conegliano for the 2019–2020 season. She joined the Turkish club Eczacıbaşı Dynavit in 2020, then transferred to VakıfBank for the 2021–2022 season. She remained with VakıfBank until 2024. In April 2024, American league League One Volleyball (LOVB) announced that Ogbogu would be a founding member of the league's Austin team for its inaugural season. It was announced in June 2025 that Chiaka Ogbogu was returning to Vakifbank for the 2025/2026 season. After winning the champions league with Vakıfbank. Fenerbaçhe S.K announced the signing of Ogbogu for the 2026/2027 season

== Clubs ==
- (Italy) Il Bisonte Firenze (2017–2018)
- (Poland) KPS Chemik Police (2018–2019)
- (Italy) Imoco Volley Conegliano (2019–2020)
- (Turkey) Eczacıbaşı VitrA (2020–2021)
- (Turkey) VakıfBank (2021–2024)
- (United States) LOVB Austin (2024–2025)
- (Turkey) VakıfBank (2025–2026)
- (Turkey) Fenerbaçhe (2026-)

== Awards ==
=== Individual ===
- 2022 FIVB Volleyball Women's Club World Championship - "Best Middle Blocker"
- 2024 Summer Olympics - "Best Middle Blocker"

=== Club ===
- 2018-19 Polish Cup - Champion, with Chemik Police
- 2019 Italian Supercup - Champion, with Imoco Volley Conegliano
- 2019 FIVB Volleyball Women's Club World Championship - Champion, with Imoco Volley Conegliano
- 2019-20 Italian Cup (Coppa Italia) - Champion, with Imoco Volley Conegliano
- 2020 AXA Sigorta Champions Cup (Turkish Super Cup) - Champion, with Eczacibasi Vitra
- 2021–22 CEV Women's Champions League Champion with Vakıfbank
- 2022 FIVB Volleyball Women's Club World Championship - Runner-Up, with VakıfBank S.K.
- 2025–26 CEV Women's Champions League Champion with Vakıfbank
