= 2013 VTV International Women's Volleyball Cup =

Tournament details
- Host country: Vietnam
- Dates: July 13–20
- Teams: 6
- Venue: 1 (in 1 host city)

Final positions
- Champions: (China) Jiangsu (1st title)

Tournament awards
- MVP: (Vietnam) Nguyễn Thị Ngọc Hoa

The 2013 VTV Cup Championship was the 10th staging. The tournament was held at the Ninh Binh Province Gymnasium in Ninh Binh, Vietnam.

== Pools composition ==
Vietnam (Host)
(China) Jiangsu
(China) Shandong
Australia
Kazakhstan U23
Thailand U20

== Preliminary round ==
Pos	Team	Pld	W	L	Pts	SW	SL	SR	SPW	SPL	SPR	Qualification
1	(China) Jiangsu	5	4	1	12	14	6	2.333	461	366	1.260	Semifinals
2	Vietnam	5	4	1	12	14	6	2.333	442	385	1.148	Semifinals
3	(China) Shandong	5	4	1	12	14	6	2.333	443	389	1.139	Semifinals
4	Kazakhstan U23	5	1	4	4	6	13	0.462	382	434	0.880	Semifinals
5	Thailand U20	5	1	4	3	6	13	0.462	361	436	0.828	
6	Australia	5	1	4	2	4	14	0.286	334	414	0.807	

Date	Time		Score		Set 1	Set 2	Set 3	Set 4	Set 5	Total	Report
13 July	16:00	Vietnam	2-3	(China) Jiangsu	15-25	25-23	25-23	21-25	9-15	95–0	Source
13 July	18:55	Australia	1-3	Thailand U20	20-25	21-25	25-20	18-25	-	84–0	Source
13 July	21:30	Kazakhstan U23	0-3	(China) Shandong	21-25	17-25	20-25	-	-	58–0	Source

Date	Time		Score		Set 1	Set 2	Set 3	Set 4	Set 5	Total	Report
14 July	14:00	Thailand U20	1-3	(China) Shandong	25-16	12-25	15-25	16-25	-	68–0	Source
14 July	16:00	Jiangsu (China)	3-0	Kazakhstan U23	25-22	25-17	25-20	-	-	75–0	Source
14 July	19:00	Vietnam	3-0	Australia	25-15	25-16	25-15	-	-	75–0	Source 1 Source 2

Date	Time		Score		Set 1	Set 2	Set 3	Set 4	Set 5	Total	Report
15 July	14:00	Kazakhstan U23	3-1	Thailand U20	25-21	15-25	25-16	25-19	-	90–0	Source
15 July	16:30	Australia	0-3	(China) Jiangsu	11-25	10-25	19-25	-	-	40–0	Source
15 July	19:00	Vietnam	3-2	(China) Shandong	25-16	17-25	25-17	17-25	15-13	99–0	Source

Date	Time		Score		Set 1	Set 2	Set 3	Set 4	Set 5	Total	Report
16 July	14:00	Australia	3-2	Kazakhstan U23	25-17	18-25	25-13	22-25	15-13	105–0	Source
16 July	16:30	Vietnam	3-0	Thailand U20	25-16	25-17	25-17	-	-	75–0	Source
16 July	19:00	Jiangsu (China)	2-3	(China) Shandong	25-17	25-23	23-25	21-25	11-15	105–0	Source

Date	Time		Score		Set 1	Set 2	Set 3	Set 4	Set 5	Total	Report
17 July	14:00	Australia	0-3	(China) Shandong	17-25	18-25	24-26	-	-	59–0	Source
17 July	16:30	Vietnam	3-1	Kazakhstan U23	23-25	25-17	25-21	25-19	-	98–0	Source
17 July	19:00	Jiangsu (China)	3-1	Thailand U20	21-25	25-15	25-10	25-17	-	96–0	Source

== Final round ==
=== Bracket ===
Semifinals
19 July – Ninh Binh
(China) Jiangsu	3
Kazakhstan U23	0
19 July - Ninh Binh
Vietnam	3
(China) Shandong	2

Final
20 July - Ninh Binh
(China) Jiangsu	3
Vietnam	1
3rd place
20 July - Ninh Binh
(Kazakhstan)	0
(China) Shandong	3

=== Semifinals ===
Date	Time		Score		Set 1	Set 2	Set 3	Set 4	Set 5	Total	Report
19 July	17:00	Jiangsu (China)	3-0	Kazakhstan U23	25-10	25-16	25-15	-	-	75–0	Source
19 July	19:00	Vietnam	3-2	(China) Shandong	23-25	20-25	28-26	25-12	15-13	111–0	Source

=== 5th place ===
Date	Time		Score		Set 1	Set 2	Set 3	Set 4	Set 5	Total	Report
19 July	14:00	Thailand U20	2-3	Australia	16-25	15-25	25-22	25-22	14-16	95–0	95-110

=== 3rd place ===
Date	Time		Score		Set 1	Set 2	Set 3	Set 4	Set 5	Total	Report
20 July	13:45	Kazakhstan U23	0-3	(China) Shandong	11-25	15-25	17-25	-	-	43–0	Source

=== Final ===
Date	Time		Score		Set 1	Set 2	Set 3	Set 4	Set 5	Total	Report
20 July	16:15	Jiangsu (China)	3-1	Vietnam	25-21	25-16	20-25	25-19	-	95–0	Source

== Final standing ==
Rank	Team
1st place, gold medalist(s)	(China) Jiangsu ECE Volleyball
2nd place, silver medalist(s)	Vietnam
3rd place, bronze medalist(s)	(China) Shandong Laishang Bank
4	Kazakhstan U23
5	Australia
6	Thailand U20

== Awards ==
- MVP: Vietnam Nguyễn Thị Ngọc Hoa
- Best spiker: (China) Jiangsu ECE Volleyball Liu Peiyi
- Best blocker: Vietnam Bùi Thị Ngà
- Best server: (China) Jiangsu ECE Volleyball Xu Ruoya
- Best setter: (China) Shandong Laishang Bank Sun Weijing
- Best receiver: (China) Jiangsu ECE Volleyball Wang Chenyue
- Best libero: (China) Jiangsu ECE Volleyball Hu Yuxuan
- Miss Volleyball: Kazakhstan U23 Batkuldina Aliya
