= Jong Jin-sim =

North Korean volleyball player (born 1992)

Personal information
- Nationality: North Korea
- Born: 1 February 1992 (age 34)
- Height: 1.82 m (5 ft 11 1/2 in)
- Weight: 70 kg (150 lb)
- Spike: 295 cm (116 in)
- Block: 285 cm (112 in)

Volleyball information
- Current club: April 25
- Number: 3

Career
Years	Teams
2010; 2013; 2015–present	Sobaeksu; Pothonggang; April 25

National team
2010–present	North Korea women

- Jong Jin-sim
- Hangul: 정진심
- RR: Jeong Jinsim
- MR: Chŏng Chinsim

Jong Jin-sim (Korean: 정진심; born 1 February 1992) is a North Korean volleyball player who competed in the 2010 Asian Games. At club level, she competed with April 25 Sports Club. She was named MVP at the 2015 VTV International Women's Volleyball Cup.
