= 2014 VTV International Women's Volleyball Cup =

Tournament details
- Host country: Vietnam
- Dates: May 17–25
- Teams: 6
- Venue: Bắc Ninh Province Gymnasium (in 1 host city)

Final positions
- Champions: Vietnam (4th title)

Tournament awards
- MVP: (Vietnam) Nguyễn Thị Ngọc Hoa

The 2014 VTV Cup Championship was the 11th staging of the international tournament. The tournament was held in Bắc Ninh, Vietnam.

== Pools composition ==
- Vietnam (Host)
- Thailand U23
- (China) Yunnan
- North Korea
- Australia
- Kazakhstan U23

== Preliminary round ==
Note: The qualification norm used in this tournament is different from FIVB international standard which looks at Set ratio before Point ratio. The host Vietnam uses Point ratio instead of Set Ratio.

Qualified for the Semifinals

Pos	Team	Pld	W	L	Pts	SPW	SPL	SPR	SW	SL	SR	Qualification
1	Vietnam	5	4	1	12	380	295	1.288	12	4	3.000	Semifinals
2	North Korea	5	4	1	12	408	333	1.225	12	5	2.400	Semifinals
3	Thailand U23	5	4	1	12	405	333	1.216	13	4	3.250	Semifinals
4	Kazakhstan U23	5	2	3	5	372	440	0.845	7	12	0.583	Semifinals
5	(China) Yunnan	5	1	4	3	368	415	0.887	6	12	0.500	
6	Australia	5	0	5	1	293	409	0.716	2	15	0.133	

Date	Time		Score		Set 1	Set 2	Set 3	Set 4	Set 5	Total	Report
17 May	15:30	Vietnam	0–3	Thailand U23	20–25	18–25	15–25			53–75	Source
17 May	18:00	Kazakhstan U23	3–1	(China) Yunnan	18–25	25–22	25–13	25–22		93–82	Source
17 May	20:00	North Korea	3–0	Australia	25–16	25–16	25–17			75–49	Source

Date	Time		Score		Set 1	Set 2	Set 3	Set 4	Set 5	Total	Report
18 May	12:30	Thailand U23	3–0	Australia	25–13	25–13	25–18			75–44	
18 May	15:00	Kazakhstan U23	0–3	North Korea	8–25	19–25	14–25			41–75	
18 May	17:30	Vietnam	3–0	(China) Yunnan	25–15	25–20	25–16			75–51	

Date	Time		Score		Set 1	Set 2	Set 3	Set 4	Set 5	Total	Report
19 May	12:30	Yunnan (China)	1–3	North Korea	13–25	25–23	19–25	24–26		81–99	
19 May	15:00	Thailand U23	3–0	Kazakhstan U23	25–12	28–26	25–22			78–60	
19 May	17:30	Vietnam	3–0	Australia	25–6	25–14	25–19			75–39	

Date	Time		Score		Set 1	Set 2	Set 3	Set 4	Set 5	Total	Report
20 May	12:30	Australia	2–3	Kazakhstan U23	22–25	25–21	25–23	22–25	11–15	105–109	
20 May	15:00	Yunnan (China)	1–3	Thailand U23	25–17	17–25	21–25	16–25		79–92	
20 May	17:30	Vietnam	3–0	North Korea	25–18	25–19	27–25			77–62	

Date	Time		Score		Set 1	Set 2	Set 3	Set 4	Set 5	Total	Report
21 May	12:30	North Korea	3–1	Thailand U23	27–25	20–25	25–16	25–19		97–85	
21 May	15:00	Vietnam	3–1	Kazakhstan U23	25–9	25–27	25-16	25-17		100–36	
21 May	17:30	Australia	0–3	(China) Yunnan	20–25	22–25	14–25			56–75	

== Final round ==
=== Bracket ===
Semifinals
23 May – Bac Ninh
North Korea	0
Thailand U23	3
23 May – Bac Ninh
Vietnam	3
Kazakhstan U23	0

Final
24 May – Bac Ninh
Thailand U23	1
Vietnam	3
3rd place
24 May – Bac Ninh
North Korea	3
Kazakhstan U23	0

=== Semifinals ===
Date	Time		Score		Set 1	Set 2	Set 3	Set 4	Set 5	Total	Report
23 May	15:00	North Korea	0–3	Thailand U23	20–25	22–25	17–25			59–75	
23 May	17:30	Vietnam	3–0	Kazakhstan U23	25–17	25–20	25–14			75–51	

=== 5th place ===
Date	Time		Score		Set 1	Set 2	Set 3	Set 4	Set 5	Total	Report
23 May	12:30	Yunnan (China)	3–0	Australia	25–16	25–22	25–19			75–57	

=== 3rd place ===
Date	Time		Score		Set 1	Set 2	Set 3	Set 4	Set 5	Total	Report
24 May	13:30	North Korea	3–0	Kazakhstan U23	25–19	25–17	25–14			75–50	

=== Final ===
Date	Time		Score		Set 1	Set 2	Set 3	Set 4	Set 5	Total	Report
24 May	15:30	Thailand U23	1–3	Vietnam	23–25	29–27	25–27	25–27		102–106	

== Final standing ==
Rank	Team
1st place, gold medalist(s)	Vietnam
2nd place, silver medalist(s)	Thailand U23
3rd place, bronze medalist(s)	North Korea
4	Kazakhstan U23
5	(China) Yunnan
6	Australia

== Awards ==
- MVP: (Vietnam) Nguyễn Thị Ngọc Hoa
- Best spiker: (Thailand) Ajcharaporn Kongyot
- Best blocker: (Vietnam) Bui Thi Nga
- Best setter: (North Korea) Min Ok Ju
- Best server: (North Korea) Jong Jin Sim
- Best digger: (Thailand) Tikamporn Changkeaw
- Best libero: (Vietnam) Nguyen Thi Kim Lien
- Miss You VTV Eximbank Cup 2014: (Vietnam) Le Thanh Thuy
