= Irina Filishtinskaya =

Russian volleyball player

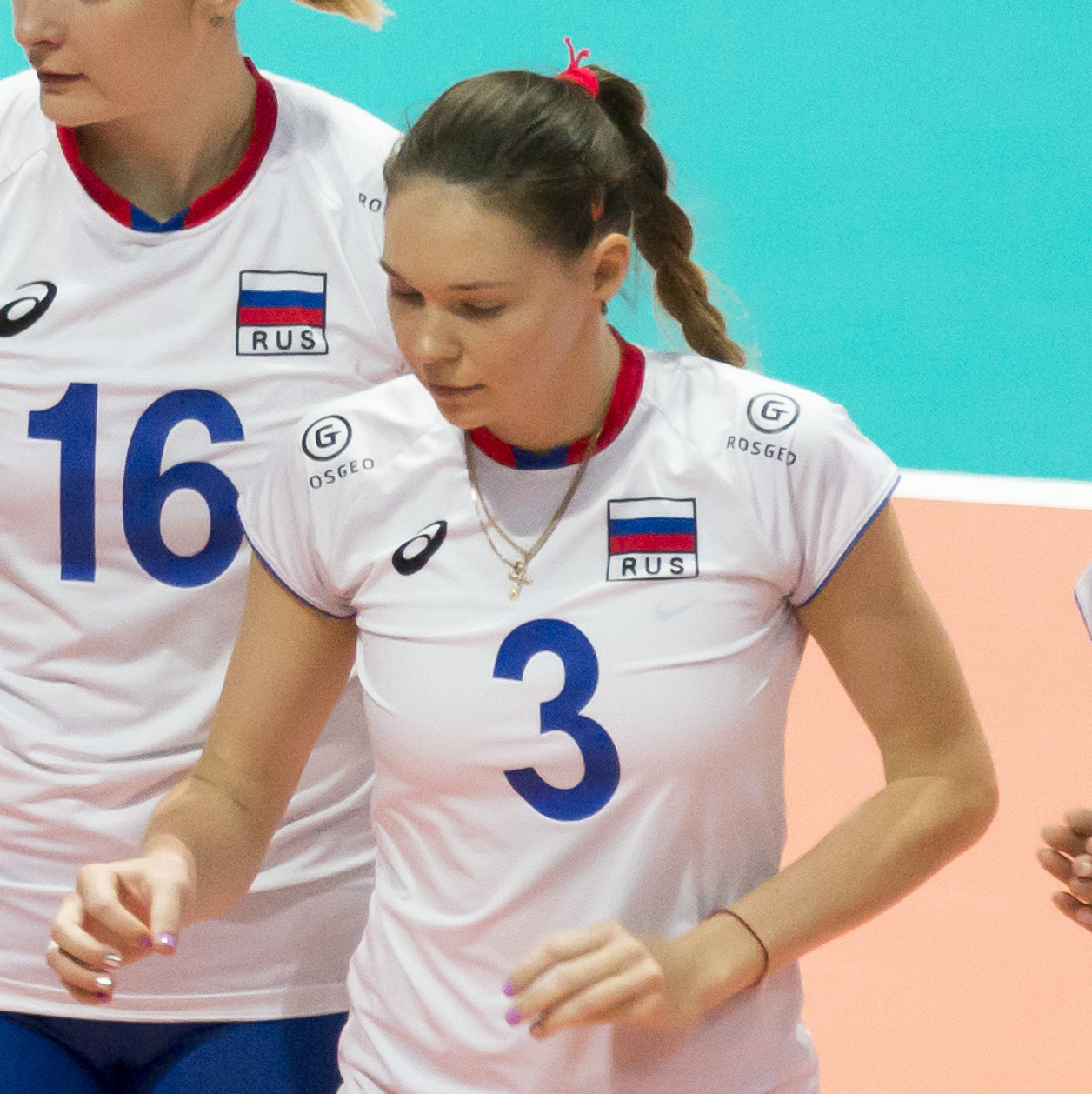

Personal information
- Nationality: Russian
- Born: 14 June 1990 (age 36); Bashkortostan, Russia
- Height: 1.80 m (5 ft 11 in)
- Weight: 65 kg (143 lb)
- Spike: 285 cm (112 in)
- Block: 275 cm (108 in)

Volleyball information
- Position: Setter
- Current club: VC Yenisey Krasnoyarsk
- Number: 14

National team
Russia

Irina Filishtinskaya (born 14 June 1990) is a Russian volleyball player for WVC Dinamo Kazan and the Russian national team.

She participated at the 2017 Women's European Volleyball Championship. and 2017 FIVB Volleyball World Grand Prix.
