= 2015 VTV International Women's Volleyball Cup =

Tournament details
- Host country: Vietnam
- Dates: July 25–August 1
- Teams: 6
- Venue: 1 (in 1 host city)

Final positions
- Champions: Thailand U23 (1st title)

Tournament awards
- MVP: (North Korea) Jong Jin Sim

The 2015 VTV Cup Championship was the 12th staging of the international tournament. The tournament was held at the Bạc Liêu Gymnasium in Bạc Liêu, Vietnam.

== Pool composition ==
Six teams participated in the tournament.

- Vietnam (hosts)
- (China) Nanjing University
- (China) Liaoning Volleyball Club
- (North Korea) April 25 Sports Club
- Thailand U23
- Philippines

== Preliminary round ==
Pos	Team	Pld	W	L	Pts	SW	SL	SR	SPW	SPL	SPR	Qualification
1	Vietnam	5	5	0	14	15	4	3.750	451	378	1.193	Semifinals
2	(China) Liaoning V.C.	5	4	1	13	14	3	4.667	405	345	1.174	Semifinals
3	(North Korea) April 25 S.C.	5	3	2	9	10	6	1.667	386	317	1.218	Semifinals
4	Thailand U23	5	2	3	6	7	9	0.778	370	337	1.098	Semifinals
5	Philippines	5	1	4	2	3	14	0.214	283	400	0.708	
6	(China) Nanjing University	5	0	5	1	2	15	0.133	285	403	0.707	

Date	Time		Score		Set 1	Set 2	Set 3	Set 4	Set 5	Total	Report
25 Jul	15:00	Liaoning V.C. (China)	3–0	Thailand U23	25–22	25–22	25–22			75–66	
25 Jul	18:00	Vietnam	3–0	Philippines	25–16	25–18	25–15			75–49	
25 Jul	20:00	April 25 S.C. (North Korea)	3–0	(China) Nanjing University	25–14	25–10	25–21			75–45	

Date	Time		Score		Set 1	Set 2	Set 3	Set 4	Set 5	Total	Report
26 Jul	15:00	Philippines	0–3	Thailand U23	10–25	13–25	21–25			44–75	
26 Jul	17:00	April 25 S.C. (North Korea)	0–3	(China) Liaoning V.C.	22–25	23–25	19–25			64–75	
26 Jul	19:00	Vietnam	3–0	(China) Nanjing University	25–14	25–18	25–15			75–47	

Date	Time		Score		Set 1	Set 2	Set 3	Set 4	Set 5	Total	Report
27 Jul	13:00	Philippines	0–3	(North Korea) April 25 S.C.	4–25	13–25	16–25			33–75	
27 Jul	15:00	Nanjing University (China)	0–3	(China) Liaoning V.C.	14–25	23–25	17–25			54–75	
27 Jul	17:00	Vietnam	3–1	Thailand U23	25–22	25–19	23–25	25-20		98–66	

Date	Time		Score		Set 1	Set 2	Set 3	Set 4	Set 5	Total	Report
28 Jul	15:00	Nanjing University (China)	2–3	Philippines	25–18	25–20	19–25	19–25	12–15	100–103	
28 Jul	17:00	Thailand U23	0–3	(North Korea) April 25 S.C.	16–25	26–28	26–28			68–81	
28 Jul	19:00	Vietnam	3–2	(China) Liaoning V.C.	25–18	26–28	25–18	13–25	18–16	107–105	

Date	Time		Score		Set 1	Set 2	Set 3	Set 4	Set 5	Total	Report
29 Jul	15:00	Thailand U23	3–0	(China) Nanjing University	25–8	25–13	25–18			75–39	
29 Jul	17:00	Liaoning V.C. (China)	3–0	Philippines	25–22	25–17	25–15			75–54	
29 Jul	19:00	Vietnam	3–1	(North Korea) April 25 S.C.	25–21	28–26	18–25	25–19		96–91	

Fixtures: Thể Thao Việt Nam

== Final round ==
=== Bracket ===
Semifinals
31 July – Bac Lieu
(China) Liaoning V.C.	3
(North Korea) April 25 S.C.	0
31 July – Bac Lieu
Vietnam	1
Thailand U23	3

Final
1 Aug – Bac Lieu
(China) Liaoning V.C.	1
Thailand U23	3
3rd place
1 Aug – Bac Lieu
(North Korea) April 25 S.C.	3
Vietnam	1

=== Semifinals ===
Date	Time		Score		Set 1	Set 2	Set 3	Set 4	Set 5	Total	Report
31 Jul	16:30	Liaoning V.C. (China)	3–0	(North Korea) April 25 S.C.	25–22	25–15	25–22			75–59	
31 Jul	18:30	Vietnam	1–3	Thailand U23	20–25	30–32	25–13	17–25		92–95	

=== 5th place ===
Date	Time		Score		Set 1	Set 2	Set 3	Set 4	Set 5	Total	Report
31 Jul	14:30	Philippines	1–3	(China) Nanjing University	25–23	14–25	18–25	8–25		65–98	

=== 3rd place ===
Date	Time		Score		Set 1	Set 2	Set 3	Set 4	Set 5	Total	Report
1 Aug	15:30	April 25 S.C. (North Korea)	3–1	Vietnam	25–21	20–25	25–18	25–18		95–82	

=== Final ===
Date	Time		Score		Set 1	Set 2	Set 3	Set 4	Set 5	Total	Report
1 Aug	18:00	Liaoning V.C. (China)	1–3	Thailand U23	22–25	26–24	25–27	20–25		93–101	

== Final standing ==
Rank	Team
1st place, gold medalist(s)	Thailand U23
2nd place, silver medalist(s)	(China) Liaoning V.C.
3rd place, bronze medalist(s)	(North Korea) April 25 S.C.
4	Vietnam
5	(China) Nanjing University
6	Philippines

2015 VTV International Women's Volleyball Cup

Thailand U23
1st title

== Awards ==
- Most valuable player
  (North Korea) Jong Jin Sim
- Best outside spikers
  (Thailand) Chatchu-on Moksri
  (Thailand) Ajcharaporn Kongyot
- Best setter
  (China) Lao Meiqi
- Best opposite spiker
  (North Korea) Ju Un Hyang
- Best middle blockers
  (Thailand) Thatdao Nuekjang
  (Vietnam) Nguyễn Thị Ngọc Hoa
- Best libero
  (China) Gong Meizi
- Miss VTV Cup 2015
  (Vietnam) Nguyễn Linh Chi
