= Vietnam women's national volleyball team =

Women's volleyball team

Vietnam
- Association: Volleyball Federation of Vietnam (VFV)
- Confederation: AVC
- Head coach: (Vietnam) Nguyễn Tuấn Kiệt
- FIVB ranking: 33 ▼5 (2 October 2026)

Uniforms
Home	Away	Third

World Championship
- Appearances: 1 (First in 2025)
- Best result: 31st place (2025)
Honours
Event	1st	2nd	3rd
Challenger Cup	0	0	1
AVC Cup	3	0	1
SEA Games	0	12	2
SEA V Cup	1	7	0
VTV Cup	6	8	3
Total	10	27	7
Challenger Cup
Bronze medal – third place	2024 Manila	Team
AVC Cup
Gold medal – first place	2023 Gresik	Team
Gold medal – first place	2024 Manila	Team
Gold medal – first place	2025 Hanoi	Team
Bronze medal – third place	2026 Candon	Team
Southeast Asian Games
Silver medal – second place	2001 Kuala Lumpur	Team
Silver medal – second place	2003 Ninh Bình	Team
Silver medal – second place	2005 Bacolod	Team
Silver medal – second place	2007 Nakhon Ratchasima	Team
Silver medal – second place	2009 Vientiane	Team
Silver medal – second place	2011 Palembang	Team
Silver medal – second place	2013 Naypyidaw	Team
Silver medal – second place	2015 Singapore	Team
Silver medal – second place	2019 Pasig	Team
Silver medal – second place	2021 Quảng Ninh	Team
Silver medal – second place	2023 Phnom Penh	Team
Silver medal – second place	2025 Bangkok	Team
Bronze medal – third place	1997 Jakarta	Team
Bronze medal – third place	2017 Kuala Lumpur	Team
SEA V Cup
Gold medal – first place	2025 Ninh Bình	Team
Silver medal – second place	2022 Nakhon Ratchasima	Team
Silver medal – second place	2023 Vĩnh Phúc / Chiang Mai	Team
Silver medal – second place	2024 Vĩnh Phúc / Nakhon Ratchasima	Team
Silver medal – second place	2025 Nakhon Ratchasima	Team
Silver medal – second place	2026 Hanoi	Team

Vietnam women's national volleyball team represents Vietnam in international volleyball matches and tournaments. It is managed by the Volleyball Federation of Vietnam.

== Medals ==
Event	Gold	Silver	Bronze	Total
World Championship	0	0	0	0
Challenger Cup	0	0	1	1
Asian Games	0	0	0	0
Asian Championship	0	0	0	0
Asian Cup	0	0	0	0
AVC Cup	3	0	1	4
SEA Games	0	12	2	14
SEA V Cup	1	7	0	8
VTV Cup	6	8	3	17
Total	10	27	7	44

== Tournaments ==
=== World Championship ===
World Championship record
Year	Round	Position	GP	MW	ML	SW	SL
1952 to 2010	Did not participate						
(Italy) 2014	Did not qualify						
(Japan) 2018	Did not qualify						
(Netherlands) (Poland) 2022	Did not participate						
(Thailand) 2025	Preliminary round	31st place	3	0	3	1	9
(Canada) (United States) 2027	Did not qualify						
(Philippines) 2029	To be determined						
Total	0 titles	1/22	3	0	3	1	9

=== Challenger Cup ===
- (France) 2023 — 8th place
- (Philippines) 2024 — (bronze) 3rd place

=== Asian Championship ===
- (Thailand) 1991 — 8th place
- (Thailand) 2001 — 7th place
- (Vietnam) 2003 — 6th place
- (China) 2005 — 8th place
- (Thailand) 2007 — 7th place
- (Vietnam) 2009 — 7th place
- (Taiwan) 2011 — 7th place
- (Thailand) 2013 — 6th place
- (China) 2015 — 5th place
- (Philippines) 2017 — 5th place
- (Thailand) 2023 — 4th place
- (China) 2026 — 7th place

=== Asian Cup ===
- (Thailand) 2008 — 5th place
- (China) 2010 — 7th place
- (Kazakhstan) 2012 — 4th place
- (China) 2014 — 8th place
- (Vietnam) 2016 — 7th place
- (Thailand) 2018 — 5th place
- (Philippines) 2022 — 4th place

=== AVC Cup ===
- (Indonesia) 2023 — (gold) Champions
- (Philippines) 2024 — (gold) Champions
- (Vietnam) 2025 — (gold) Champions
- (Philippines) 2026 — (bronze) 3rd place

=== Asian Games ===
- (Qatar) 2006 — 7th place
- (China) 2010 — Did not participate
- (South Korea) 2014 — Did not participate
- (Indonesia) 2018 — 6th place
- (China) 2022 — 4th place
- (Japan) 2026 — 7th place

=== SEA Games ===
- (Indonesia) 1997 — Bronze medal
- (Malaysia) 2001 — Silver medal
- (Vietnam) 2003 — Silver medal
- (Philippines) 2005 — Silver medal
- (Thailand) 2007 — Silver medal
- (Laos) 2009 — Silver medal
- (Indonesia) 2011 — Silver medal
- (Myanmar) 2013 — Silver medal
- (Singapore) 2015 — Silver medal
- (Malaysia) 2017 — Bronze medal
- (Philippines) 2019 — Silver medal
- (Vietnam) 2021 — Silver medal
- (Cambodia) 2023 — Silver medal
- (Thailand) 2025 — Silver medal

=== SEA V Cup ===
- (Thailand) (Philippines) 2019 — 4th place / 4th place
- (Thailand) 2022 — Runners-up
- (Vietnam) (Thailand) 2023 — Runners-up / Runners-up
- (Vietnam) (Thailand) 2024 — Runners-up / Runners-up
- (Thailand) (Vietnam) 2025 — Runners-up / Champions
- (Vietnam) (Thailand) 2026 — Runners-up / 4th place

=== VTV Cup ===
- 2004 — 4th place
- 2005 — Runners-up
- 2006 — Runners-up
- 2007 — Champions
- 2008 — 3rd place
- 2009 — Champions
- 2010 — Champions
- 2011 — 3rd place
- 2012 — 4th Place
- 2013 — Runners-up
- 2014 — Champions
- 2015 — 4th Place
- 2016 — Runners-up
- 2017 — 3rd place
- 2018 — Champions
- 2019 — Runners-up
- 2023
  - Vietnam 1 — Champions
  - Vietnam 2 — Runners-up
- 2024 — Runners-up
- 2025 — Runners-up

== Current squad ==
- Head coach: (Vietnam) Nguyễn Tuấn Kiệt
- Assistant coaches:
  - (Vietnam) Nguyễn Thị Ngọc Hoa
  - (Vietnam) Nguyễn Ngọc Dũng
- Trainer: (Australia) Karl Lim
- Therapist: (Vietnam) Nguyễn Đức Tuấn
- Statistician: (Vietnam) Vũ Hồng Đăng

The following list consists of 12 players who are called for 2026 Asian Games:

#	Pos	Name	Date of birth	Height	Weight	Spike	Block	2026 club
1	OP	Nguyễn Thị Trà My	July 7, 2004 (age 22)	1.78 m (5 ft 10 in)	65 kg (143 lb)	295 cm (116 in)	290 cm (110 in)	(Vietnam) VTV Bình Điền Long An
3	OH	Trần Thị Thanh Thúy (captain)	November 12, 1997 (age 28)	1.90 m (6 ft 3 in)	73 kg (161 lb)	310 cm (120 in)	300 cm (120 in)	(Japan) Gunma Green Wings
5	OH	Bùi Thị Ánh Thảo	May 4, 2009 (age 17)	1.75 m (5 ft 9 in)	62 kg (137 lb)	295 cm (116 in)	285 cm (112 in)	(Vietnam) Hà Nội Tasco Auto
6	OH	Phạm Quỳnh Hương	February 14, 2008 (age 18)	1.87 m (6 ft 2 in)	72 kg (159 lb)	300 cm (120 in)	293 cm (115 in)	(Vietnam) Binh chủng Thông tin
8	MB	Lê Thanh Thúy	May 23, 1995 (age 31)	1.80 m (5 ft 11 in)	65 kg (143 lb)	298 cm (117 in)	290 cm (110 in)	(Vietnam) Hà Nội Tasco Auto
9	S	Vi Thị Yến Nhi	November 21, 2002 (age 23)	1.76 m (5 ft 9 in)	64 kg (141 lb)	296 cm (117 in)	288 cm (113 in)	(Vietnam) Hà Nội Tasco Auto
10	MB	Lê Như Anh	July 23, 2005 (age 21)	1.78 m (5 ft 10 in)	58 kg (128 lb)	290 cm (110 in)	285 cm (112 in)	(Vietnam) VTV Bình Điền Long An
12	L	Nguyễn Khánh Đang	October 3, 2000 (age 26)	1.58 m (5 ft 2 in)	56 kg (123 lb)	–	–	(Vietnam) Hà Nội Tasco Auto
14	S	Võ Thị Kim Thoa	March 18, 1998 (age 28)	1.73 m (5 ft 8 in)	67 kg (148 lb)	280 cm (110 in)	270 cm (110 in)	(Vietnam) VTV Bình Điền Long An
15	MB	Lưu Thị Huệ	February 1, 1999 (age 27)	1.85 m (6 ft 1 in)	65 kg (143 lb)	300 cm (120 in)	290 cm (110 in)	(Vietnam) LP Bank Ninh Bình
18	L	Lê Thị Yến	September 15, 1997 (age 29)	1.68 m (5 ft 6 in)	54 kg (119 lb)	–	–	(Vietnam) Đức Giang Chemical
26	MB	Trần Thị Bích Thủy	December 11, 2000 (age 25)	1.84 m (6 ft 0 in)	68 kg (150 lb)	308 cm (121 in)	300 cm (120 in)	(Vietnam) Đức Giang Chemical

Notes:

- ^{OP} Opposite spiker
- ^{OH} Outside hitter
- ^{MB} Middle blocker
- ^{S} Setter
- ^{L} Libero
