= Volleyball at the 2017 SEA Games – Women's tournament =

Volleyball – Women's tournament at the 2017 SEA Games
- Venue: Malaysia International Trade & Exhibition Centre
- Nations: 6

The women's volleyball tournament at the 2017 SEA Games was held in Kuala Lumpur, Malaysia at the Malaysia International Trade & Exhibition Centre.

== Draw ==
=== Participating nations ===
- Indonesia
- Malaysia
- Myanmar
- Philippines
- Thailand
- Vietnam

Source: Volleyverse

== Results ==
All times are Malaysia Standard Time (UTC+8)

=== Preliminary round ===
==== Group A ====
Pos	Team	Pld	W	L	Pts	SW	SL	SR	SPW	SPL	SPR	Qualification
1	Thailand	2	2	0	6	6	0	MAX	150	75	2.000	Semifinals
2	Indonesia	2	1	1	3	3	3	1.000	119	107	1.112	Semifinals
3	Myanmar	2	0	2	0	0	6	0.000	63	150	0.420	

Date	Time		Score		Set 1	Set 2	Set 3	Set 4	Set 5	Total	Report
23 Aug	12:00	Thailand	3–0	Indonesia	25–18	25–16	25–10			75–44	Report
24 Aug	12:00	Myanmar	0–3	Thailand	8–25	10–25	13–25			31–75	Report
25 Aug	12:00	Indonesia	3–0	Myanmar	25–12	25–13	25–7			75–32	Report

==== Group B ====
Pos	Team	Pld	W	L	Pts	SW	SL	SR	SPW	SPL	SPR	Qualification
1	Vietnam	2	2	0	6	6	0	MAX	151	94	1.606	Semifinals
2	Philippines	2	1	1	3	3	3	1.000	134	121	1.107	Semifinals
3	Malaysia	2	0	2	0	0	6	0.000	80	150	0.533	

Date	Time		Score		Set 1	Set 2	Set 3	Set 4	Set 5	Total	Report
23 Aug	14:00	Malaysia	0–3	Vietnam	17–25	7–25	11–25			35–75	Report
24 Aug	14:00	Philippines	3–0	Malaysia	25–18	25–11	25–16			75–45	Report
25 Aug	14:00	Vietnam	3–0	Philippines	26–24	25–12	25–23			76–59	Report

=== Final round ===
Semi-finals
26 Aug
Thailand	3
Philippines	0
26 Aug
Indonesia	3
Vietnam	2

Final
27 Aug
Thailand	3
Indonesia	0
Third place
27 Aug
Philippines	1
Vietnam	3

==== Semifinals ====
Date	Time		Score		Set 1	Set 2	Set 3	Set 4	Set 5	Total	Report
26 Aug	10:00	Thailand	3–0	Philippines	25–21	25–17	25–17			75–55	
26 Aug	12:00	Indonesia	3–2	Vietnam	18–25	25–21	29–27	15–25	15–13	102–111	

==== Bronze medal match ====
Date	Time		Score		Set 1	Set 2	Set 3	Set 4	Set 5	Total	Report
27 Aug	10:00	Philippines	1–3	Vietnam	27–25	22–25	20–25	21–25		90–100	Report

==== Gold medal match ====
Date	Time		Score		Set 1	Set 2	Set 3	Set 4	Set 5	Total	Report
27 Aug	16:00	Thailand	3–0	Indonesia	25–18	26–24	26–24			77–66	Report

== Final standings ==
Rank	Team
1st place, gold medalist(s)	Thailand
2nd place, silver medalist(s)	Indonesia
3rd place, bronze medalist(s)	Vietnam
4	Philippines
5	Malaysia
5	Myanmar

== See also ==
- Men's tournament
