= Volleyball at the 2013 SEA Games =

- Venue: Zayyarthiri Indoor Stadium, Naypyidaw, Myanmar
- Dates: December 13–21, 2013
- Nations: 7

Volleyball at the 2013 SEA Games took place at Zayyarthiri Indoor Stadium, Naypyidaw, Myanmar between December 13–21.

== Indoor volleyball ==
=== Men's tournament ===
==== Preliminary round ====
===== Group A =====
Pos	Team	Pld	W	L	Pts	SW	SL	SR	SPW	SPL	SPR	Qualification
1	Thailand	3	3	0	9	9	0	MAX	225	155	1.452	Semifinals
2	Myanmar	3	2	1	6	6	3	2.000	210	180	1.167	Semifinals
3	Malaysia	3	1	2	3	3	7	0.429	186	224	0.830	
4	Cambodia	3	0	3	0	1	9	0.111	185	247	0.749	

Date		Score		Set 1	Set 2	Set 3	Set 4	Set 5	Total
13 Dec	Thailand	3–0	Malaysia	25–8	25–12	25–18			75–38
13 Dec	Cambodia	0–3	Myanmar	18–25	16–25	20–25			54–75
15 Dec	Cambodia	0–3	Thailand	20–25	23–25	14–25			57–75
15 Dec	Myanmar	3–0	Malaysia	25–15	25–21	25–15			75-51
17 Dec	Malaysia	3–1	Cambodia	22–25	25–17	25–18	25–14		97–74
17 Dec	Thailand	3–0	Myanmar	25–22	25–16	25–22			75–60

===== Group B =====
Pos	Team	Pld	W	L	Pts	SW	SL	SR	SPW	SPL	SPR	Qualification
1	Indonesia	2	2	0	6	6	2	3.000	187	148	1.264	Semifinals
2	Vietnam	2	1	1	3	2	3	0.667	179	158	1.133	Semifinals
3	Laos	2	0	2	0	0	3	0.000	90	150	0.600	

Date		Score		Set 1	Set 2	Set 3	Set 4	Set 5	Total
14 Dec	Indonesia	3–2	Vietnam	32–30	23–25	17–25	25–15	15–9	112–104
16 Dec	Laos	0–3	Indonesia	13–25	15–25	16–25			44–75
18 Dec	Vietnam	3–0	Laos	25-20	25-16	25-10			75-46

=== Knockout stage ===
Semi-finals
19 December
Thailand	3
Vietnam	0
19 December
Indonesia	3
Myanmar	2

Final
21 December
Thailand	3
Indonesia	0
Third place
20 December
Vietnam	3
Myanmar	0

=== 5th Place ===
Date		Score		Set 1	Set 2	Set 3	Set 4	Set 5	Total
20 Dec	Malaysia	2–3	Laos	20–25	25–23	26–24	22–25	16–18	109–115

=== Semifinals ===
Date		Score		Set 1	Set 2	Set 3	Set 4	Set 5	Total
19 Dec	Thailand	3–0	Vietnam	25–18	25–21	25–23			75–62
19 Dec	Indonesia	3–2	Myanmar	25–20	25–22	21–25	19–25	15–13	105–105

==== Bronze Medal match ====
Date		Score		Set 1	Set 2	Set 3	Set 4	Set 5	Total
20 Dec	Myanmar	0–3	Vietnam	23–25	18–25	25–27			66–77

==== Gold Medal match ====
Date		Score		Set 1	Set 2	Set 3	Set 4	Set 5	Total
21 Dec	Thailand	3–0	Indonesia	25-20	25-17	25-21			75-58

==== Final standing ====
Rank	Team
1st place, gold medalist(s)	Thailand
2nd place, silver medalist(s)	Indonesia
3rd place, bronze medalist(s)	Vietnam
4	Myanmar
5	Laos
6	Malaysia
7	Cambodia

2013 Men's SEA Games champions

Thailand
Fifth title

=== Women's tournament ===
==== Preliminary round ====
Pos	Team	Pld	W	L	Pts	SW	SL	SR	SPW	SPL	SPR	Qualification
1	Thailand	4	4	0	12	12	0	MAX	300	168	1.786	Gold Medal match
2	Vietnam	4	3	1	9	9	3	3.000	281	193	1.456	Gold Medal match
3	Indonesia	4	2	2	6	6	7	0.857	276	252	1.095	
4	Myanmar	4	1	3	3	4	12	0.333	208	301	0.691	
5	Malaysia	4	0	4	0	0	12	0.000	149	300	0.497	

Date		Score		Set 1	Set 2	Set 3	Set 4	Set 5	Total
13 Dec	Myanmar	3–0	Malaysia	25–17	25–17	25–22			75–56
14 Dec	Thailand	3–0	Malaysia	25–12	25–9	25–9			75–30
14 Dec	Vietnam	3–0	Myanmar	25–14	25–9	25–14			75–37
15 Dec	Vietnam	3–0	Indonesia	25–13	25–14	25–23			75–50
16 Dec	Thailand	3–0	Vietnam	25–18	25–16	25–22			75–56
16 Dec	Indonesia	3–1	Myanmar	25-13	20-25	25-17	25-15		95-70
17 Dec	Malaysia	0–3	Vietnam	9-25	10-25	12-25			31-75
18 Dec	Malaysia	0–3	Indonesia	13-25	10-25	9-25			32-75
18 Dec	Myanmar	0–3	Thailand	11-25	6-25	9-25			26-75
19 Dec	Indonesia	0–3	Thailand	17-25	19-25	20-25			56-75

==== Bronze Medal match ====
December 20, 2013	Indonesia	3–0	Myanmar	Zayyarthiri Indoor Stadium, Naypyidaw, Myanmar
December 20, 2013	(25–12, 25–15, 25–15, 0–0, 0–0)			Zayyarthiri Indoor Stadium, Naypyidaw, Myanmar

==== Gold Medal match ====
December 21, 2013	Thailand	3–0	Vietnam	Zayyarthiri Indoor Stadium, Naypyidaw, Myanmar
December 21, 2013	(25–16, 25–20, 25–18, 0–0, 0–0)			Zayyarthiri Indoor Stadium, Naypyidaw, Myanmar

==== Final standing ====
Rank	Team
1st place, gold medalist(s)	Thailand
2nd place, silver medalist(s)	Vietnam
3rd place, bronze medalist(s)	Indonesia
4	Myanmar
5	Malaysia

2013 Women's SEA Games champions

Thailand
Eleventh title

Team Roster
Wanna Buakaew, Piyanut Pannoy, Thatdao Nuekjang, Pleumjit Thinkaow, Onuma Sittirak, Wilavan Apinyapong, Amporn Hyapha, Tapaphaipun Chaisri, Nootsara Tomkom, Malika Kanthong, Pornpun Guedpard, Ajcharaporn Kongyot
Head Coach: Kiattipong Radchatagriengkai

== Medal winners ==
Event	Gold	Silver	Bronze
Men's volleyball	Thailand (THA)	Indonesia (INA)	Vietnam (VIE)
Women's volleyball	Thailand (THA)	Vietnam (VIE)	Indonesia (INA)
