= VC Kuanysh =

Kazakh women's volleyball team

- Full name: Kuanysh Volleyball Club
- Nickname: Kuanysh
- Founded: 2014
- Director: Khamzin Kayrbek Sadvakasovich
- Head coach: Azamat Yessimov
- League: Kazakhstan National Liga
- 2022–23: 1
- Website: Club home page

Kuanysh Volleyball Club or VC Kuanysh (Russian: BK "Куаныш", Kazakh: BK "Қуаныш", romanized: "Qỳanysh" VK) is a Kazakh women's volleyball team.

== History ==
It was formally on September 3, 2014, in Petropavl as Kuanysh Volleyball Club LLP. The team however would be based on a rural team in Timiryazev District formed in 2009 which represents the North Kazakhstan Region in youth domestic tournaments.

The team would be promoted to the Kazakhstan Women's National League for the first time after topping the A-League in the 2016–17 season. They made their National League debut in the 2017–18 season.

As 2021–22 National League, third placers, they would make their debut at the Asian Women's Club Volleyball Championship in its 2022 edition. They won the title at the expense of fellow Kazakh club Altay.
