= Volleyball Federation of Vietnam =

National governing body for volleyball in Vietnam

- Liên đoàn Bóng chuyền Việt Nam
- Sport: Volleyball
- Jurisdiction: Vietnam
- Abbreviation: VFV
- Founded: 1961
- Affiliation: FIVB
- Affiliation date: 1991
- Regional affiliation: AVC
- Affiliation date: 1991
- Headquarters: 36 Tran Phu Street, Hanoi, Vietnam
- President: Minh Hong LE

The Volleyball Federation of Vietnam (VFV; Vietnamese: Liên đoàn Bóng chuyền Việt Nam) is the national governing body for volleyball in Vietnam. It was founded in 1961, and has been a member of FIVB since 1991. It is also a member of the Asian Volleyball Confederation.
