= 2012 FIVB Women's Club World Championship squads =

This article shows all participating team squads at the 2012 FIVB Women's Club World Championship squads, held from October 13 to 19, 2012 in Doha, Qatar.

== Pool A ==
=== Rabita Baku ===
- Head Coach: (Serbia) Zoran Gajic

Number	Player
1	(Bulgaria) Dobriana Rabadzhieva
2	(Germany) Angelina Hübner-Grün
3	(Poland) Katarzyna Skorupa
5	(Serbia) Nataša Krsmanović
7	(Colombia) Madelaynne Montaño
8	(Puerto Rico) Áurea Cruz
10	(Ukraine) Alexandra Fomina
12	(Serbia) Mira Golubović (c)
15	(Serbia) Sanja Starović
16	(United States) Foluke Akinradewo
17	(Ukraine) Iryna Zhukova
18	(Serbia) Suzana Ćebić (L)

=== Sollys Nestlé Osasco ===
- Head Coach: (Brazil) Luizomar de Moura

Number	Player
1	(Brazil) Ivna Marra
4	(Brazil) Samara Almeida
5	(Brazil) Adenízia da Silva
6	(Brazil) Thaísa Menezes
7	(Brazil) Karine Souza
8	(Brazil) Jaqueline Carvalho (c)
12	(Brazil) Gabriella Souza
13	(Brazil) Sheilla Castro
14	(Brazil) Fabíola de Sousa
15	(Brazil) Daniele Oliveira
16	(Brazil) Fernanda Garay
18	(Brazil) Camila Brait (L)

=== Bohai Bank Tianjin ===
- Head Coach: (China) Wang Baoquan

Number	Player
1	(China) Zhang Xiaoyu
2	(China) Wang Ning
4	(China) Wang Jiamin
7	(China) Yin Na (c)
9	(China) Wang Qian (L)
10	(China) Li Juan
11	(China) Mi Yang
12	(China) Zhang Xiaoting
14	(China) Chen Liyi
15	(China) Liu Ya
16	(China) Yao Di
18	(China) Li Ying

== Pool B ==
=== Fenerbahçe ===
- Head Coach: (Turkey) Kamil Soz

Number	Player
1	(Brazil) Marianne Steinbrecher
2	(Turkey) Merve Dalbeler (L)
3	(Turkey) Nihan Güneyligil (L)
4	(Brazil) Paula Pequeno
5	(Turkey) Elif Onur
7	(Turkey) Elif Öner
8	(Turkey) İpek Soroğlu
9	(Turkey) Seda Tokatlıoğlu (c)
11	(Turkey) Nilay Özdemir
12	(Poland) Berenika Okuniewska
13	(Turkey) Meryem Çalık
14	(Turkey) Eda Erdem Dündar

=== Lancheras de Cataño ===
- Head Coach: (Puerto Rico) Rafael Olazagasti

Number	Player
1	(Puerto Rico) Tatiana Jusino
2	(Puerto Rico) Debora Seilhamer (L)
3	(Puerto Rico) Yarimar Rosa
4	(Puerto Rico) Tatiana Encarnación
5	(Puerto Rico) Myrlena López
6	(Puerto Rico) Paulette García
7	(Puerto Rico) Mariel Medina
8	(Puerto Rico) Jetzabel Del Valle
9	(Venezuela) Oneida González
10	(Puerto Rico) Natalia Valentin
11	(United States) Jessica Jones
18	(Puerto Rico) Shanon Torregrosa (c)

=== Kenya Prisons ===
- Head Coach: (Kenya) David Lung'aho

Number	Player
1	(Kenya) Jane Wairimu
2	(Kenya) Everlyne Makuto
3	(Kenya) Diana Khisa (c)
5	(Kenya) Salome Wanjala
7	(Kenya) Jane Jepkemboi
8	(Kenya) Joan Kibor
9	(Kenya) Elizabeth Wanyama (L)
11	(Kenya) Loice Jepkoisgei
12	(Kenya) Lydia Maiyo
13	(Kenya) Dorcas Jepleting
14	(Kenya) Mercy Moim
15	(Kenya) Brackcides Khadambi
