= 2017 Asian Women's Club Volleyball Championship =

2017 Asian Women's Club Championship
Tournament details
- Host country: Kazakhstan
- Dates: May 25–31, 2017
- Teams: 8
- Venue: 1 (in 1 host city)

Final positions
- Champions: (Thailand) Supreme Chonburi (1st title)

Tournament awards
- MVP: (Senegal) Fatou Diouck (Chonburi)

The 2017 Asian Women's Club Volleyball Championship was the 18th edition of the Asian Women's Club Volleyball Championship, an international volleyball club tournament organised by the Asian Volleyball Confederation (AVC) with Volleyball Federation of the Republic of Kazakhstan (VFRK). It was held in Ust-Kamenogorsk, Kazakhstan from 25 to 31 May 2017. The tournament will serve as the Asian qualifiers for the 2018 FIVB Volleyball Women's Club World Championship with the champion qualifying for the world championship.

The matches was played in only one stadium in Ust-Kamenogorsk: Boris Alexandrov Sports Palace. It was the second time that Kazakhstan and the first time that Ust-Kamenogorsk had hosted the tournament. As hosts, Kazakhstan automatically participated for the tournament.

== Participated teams ==
Central Asia (CAZA)	East Asia (EAZA)	Oceania (OZA)	Southeast Asia (SEAZA)	West Asia (WAZA)
Kazakhstan (host); Iran	China; Chinese Taipei; Japan		Vietnam; Philippines; Thailand	

=== Qualification ===
Team	Qualified as
(Kazakhstan) Altay	Hosts
(China) Tianjin Bohai Bank	2016 Chinese Volleyball League Champions
(Chinese Taipei) Taiwan Power	2016 Enterprise Volleyball League Champions
(Iran) Sarmayeh Bank	2016 Iranian Volleyball League Champions
(Japan) Hisamitsu Springs	2016 V.Premier League Champions
(Philippines) Rebisco-PSL Manila	Philippine Super Liga Representatives (Note: The 2016 PSL Grand Prix champions, Foton Tornadoes were originally meant to participate in the tournament but later begged off from participating. A selection team of the Philippine Super Liga will compete as a club instead.)
(Thailand) Supreme Chonburi	2017 Volleyball Thailand League Champions
(Vietnam) Vietinbank VC	2016 Volleyball Vietnam League Champions

== Pools composition ==
The teams were seeded based on their final ranking at the 2016 Asian Women's Club Volleyball Championship. The host country and the top 7 ranked teams were seed in the Serpentine system. The 7 remaining teams were drawn on 27 February 2017 in Bangkok, Thailand.

Ranking from the previous edition was shown in brackets except the host (who ranked 4th) and the teams who did not participate, which were denoted by (-).

Pool A	Pool B
Kazakhstan (Host & 4th); Thailand (3rd); Iran (5th); Chinese Taipei (8th)	Japan (1st); China (2nd); Vietnam (6th); Philippines (7th)

== Venue ==
The tournament was hosted in Boris Alexandrov Sports Palace, located in Ust-Kamenogorsk, East Kazakhstan.

Ust-Kamenogorsk, East Kazakhstan
Boris Alexandrov Sports Palace
Capacity: 4,400
Ust-Kamenogorsk is located in Kazakhstan

== Pool standing procedure ==
The following procedures shall be followed to determine the ranking of teams in a pool:

1. Number of matches won
2. Match points
3. Sets ratio
4. Points ratio
5. Result of the last match between the tied teams

Match won 3–0 or 3–1: 3 match points for the winner, 0 match points for the loser
Match won 3–2: 2 match points for the winner, 1 match point for the loser

== Preliminary round ==
- All times are in Kazakhstan Standard Time (UTC+06:00).

=== Pool A ===
Pos	Team	Pld	W	L	Pts	SW	SL	SR	SPW	SPL	SPR	Qualification
1	(Thailand) Supreme Chonburi	3	3	0	8	9	4	2.250	297	268	1.108	Semi-finals
2	(Kazakhstan) Altay	3	2	1	6	8	5	1.600	277	258	1.074	Semi-finals
3	(Iran) Sarmayeh Bank	3	1	2	3	4	7	0.571	237	262	0.905	Semi-finals
4	(Chinese Taipei) Taiwan Power	3	0	3	1	4	9	0.444	270	293	0.922	Semi-finals

Date	Time		Score		Set 1	Set 2	Set 3	Set 4	Set 5	Total	Report
25 May	13:00	Supreme Chonburi (Thailand)	3–1	(Iran) Sarmayeh Bank	25–22	25–21	22–25	25–23		97–91	P2
25 May	19:00	Altay (Kazakhstan)	3–2	(Chinese Taipei) Taiwan Power	21–25	25–22	25–19	17–25	15–11	103–102	P2
26 May	14:00	Taiwan Power (Chinese Taipei)	1–3	(Iran) Sarmayeh Bank	25–18	21–25	22–25	22–25		90–93	P2
26 May	19:00	Altay (Kazakhstan)	2–3	(Thailand) Supreme Chonburi	21–25	19–25	25–17	25–21	9–15	99–103	P2
27 May	14:00	Supreme Chonburi (Thailand)	3–1	(Chinese Taipei) Taiwan Power	22–25	25–17	25–17	25–19		97–78	P2
27 May	19:00	Sarmayeh Bank (Iran)	0–3	(Kazakhstan) Altay	16–25	18–25	19–25			53–75	P2

=== Pool B ===
Pos	Team	Pld	W	L	Pts	SW	SL	SR	SPW	SPL	SPR	Qualification
1	(Japan) Hisamitsu Springs	3	3	0	9	9	1	9.000	239	174	1.374	Semi-finals
2	(China) Tianjin Bohai Bank	3	2	1	6	7	3	2.333	236	168	1.405	Semi-finals
3	(Vietnam) Vietinbank	3	1	2	3	3	7	0.429	191	230	0.830	Semi-finals
4	(Philippines) Rebisco-PSL	3	0	3	0	1	9	0.111	148	242	0.612	Semi-finals

Date	Time		Score		Set 1	Set 2	Set 3	Set 4	Set 5	Total	Report
25 May	10:30	Hisamitsu Springs (Japan)	3–0	(Philippines) Rebisco-PSL	25–17	25–10	25–14			75–41	P2
25 May	15:30	Tianjin Bohai Bank (China)	3–0	(Vietnam) Vietinbank	25–15	25–21	25–16			75–52	P2
26 May	11:30	Rebisco-PSL (Philippines)	1–3	(Vietnam) Vietinbank	21–25	25–17	20–25	14–25		80–92	P2
26 May	16:30	Hisamitsu Springs (Japan)	3–1	(China) Tianjin Bohai Bank	25–21	25–22	14–25	25–18		89–86	P2
27 May	11:30	Tianjin Bohai Bank (China)	3–0	(Philippines) Rebisco-PSL	25–8	25–10	25–9			75–27	P2
27 May	16:30	Vietinbank (Vietnam)	0–3	(Japan) Hisamitsu Springs	17–25	11–25	19–25			47–75	P2

== Final round ==
=== Bracket ===
Fifth place
(Iran) Sarmayeh Bank	1
(Chinese Taipei) Taiwan Power	3
Seventh place
(Philippines) Rebisco-PSL	0
(Vietnam) Vietinbank	3

Fifth place play-offs
(Philippines) Rebisco-PSL	0
(Iran) Sarmayeh Bank	3
(Chinese Taipei) Taiwan Power	3
(Vietnam) Vietinbank	0

Quarterfinals
(Thailand) Supreme Chonburi	3
(Philippines) Rebisco-PSL	1
(China) Tianjin Bohai Bank	3
(Iran) Sarmayeh Bank	0
(Japan) Hisamitsu Springs	3
(Chinese Taipei) Taiwan Power	1
(Kazakhstan) Altay	3
(Vietnam) Vietinbank	0

Semifinals
(Thailand) Supreme Chonburi	3
(China) Tianjin Bohai Bank	1
(Japan) Hisamitsu Springs	3
(Kazakhstan) Altay	2

Final
(Thailand) Supreme Chonburi	3
(Japan) Hisamitsu Springs	1
Third place
(China) Tianjin Bohai Bank	3
(Kazakhstan) Altay	1

=== Quarter-finals ===
Date	Time		Score		Set 1	Set 2	Set 3	Set 4	Set 5	Total	Report
29 May	11:30	Hisamitsu Springs (Japan)	3–1	(Chinese Taipei) Taiwan Power	25–20	15–25	25–12	25–19		90–76	P2
29 May	14:00	Supreme Chonburi (Thailand)	3–1	(Philippines) Rebisco-PSL	25–20	25–12	18–25	27–25		95–82	P2
29 May	16:30	Tianjin Bohai Bank (China)	3–0	(Iran) Sarmayeh Bank	25–11	25–20	25–11			75–42	P2
29 May	19:00	Altay (Kazakhstan)	3–0	(Vietnam) Vietinbank	25–23	25–18	25–14			75–55	P2

=== Fifth-Eighth place play-offs ===
Date	Time		Score		Set 1	Set 2	Set 3	Set 4	Set 5	Total	Report
30 May	11:30	Rebisco-PSL (Philippines)	0–3	(Iran) Sarmayeh Bank	23–25	17–25	27–29			67–79	P2
30 May	14:00	Taiwan Power (Chinese Taipei)	3–0	(Vietnam) Vietinbank	25–19	25–19	25–17			75–55	P2

=== Semi-finals ===
Date	Time		Score		Set 1	Set 2	Set 3	Set 4	Set 5	Total	Report
30 May	16:30	Supreme Chonburi (Thailand)	3–1	(China) Tianjin Bohai Bank	25–22	25–23	24–26	25–23		99–94	P2
30 May	19:00	Hisamitsu Springs (Japan)	3–2	(Kazakhstan) Altay	18–25	25–17	25–21	22–25	16–14	106–102	P2

=== Seventh place match ===
Date	Time		Score		Set 1	Set 2	Set 3	Set 4	Set 5	Total	Report
31 May	09:30	Rebisco-PSL (Philippines)	0–3	(Vietnam) Vietinbank	13–25	18–25	15–25			46–75	P2

=== Fifth place match ===
Date	Time		Score		Set 1	Set 2	Set 3	Set 4	Set 5	Total	Report
31 May	12:00	Sarmayeh Bank (Iran)	1–3	(Chinese Taipei) Taiwan Power	20–25	25–18	20–25	12–25		77–93	P2

=== Third place match ===
Date	Time		Score		Set 1	Set 2	Set 3	Set 4	Set 5	Total	Report
31 May	14:30	Tianjin Bohai Bank (China)	3–1	(Kazakhstan) Altay	20–25	25–22	25–22	25–20		95–89	P2

=== Final ===
Date	Time		Score		Set 1	Set 2	Set 3	Set 4	Set 5	Total	Report
31 May	17:00	Supreme Chonburi (Thailand)	3–1	(Japan) Hisamitsu Springs	25–15	25–23	23–25	25–13		98–76	P2

== Final standing ==
Rank	Team
1st place, gold medalist(s)	(Thailand) Supreme Chonburi
2nd place, silver medalist(s)	(Japan) Hisamitsu Springs
3rd place, bronze medalist(s)	(China) Tianjin Bohai Bank
4	(Kazakhstan) Altay
5	(Chinese Taipei) Taiwan Power
6	(Iran) Sarmayeh Bank
7	(Vietnam) Vietinbank
8	(Philippines) Rebisco-PSL

Qualified for the 2018 FIVB Volleyball Women's Club World Championship

2017 Asian Women's Club Champions

1st title

Team roster
Supattra Pairoj, Piyanut Pannoy, Pleumjit Thinkaow, Patcharaporn Sittisad, Chatchu-on Moksri, Wilavan Apinyapong (c), Nampueng Khamart, Soraya Phomla, Chloe Mann, Parinya Pankaew, Watchareeya Nuanjam, Ajcharaporn Kongyot, Fatou Diouck, Rattanakorn Sanuanram
Head coach
(Thailand) Nataphon Srisamutnak

== Medalists ==
Gold	Silver	Bronze
(Thailand) Supreme Chonburi Supattra Pairoj; Piyanut Pannoy; Pleumjit Thinkaow; Patcharaporn Sittisad; Chatchu-on Moksri; Wilavan Apinyapong (c); Nampueng Khamart; Soraya Phomla; Chloe Mann; Parinya Pankaew; Watchareeya Nuanjam; Ajcharaporn Kongyot; Fatou Diouck; Rattanakorn Sanuanram	(Japan) Hisamitsu Springs Ayano Nakaoji; Risa Ishibashi (c); Hitomi Kodama; Haruka Kanamori; Erika Sakae; Yuka Imamura; Kiyora Obikawa; Fumika Moriya; Yuka Taura; Asuka Hamamatsu; Hikari Kato; Mana Toe; Akane Ukishima; Sayaka Tsutsui	(China) Tianjin Bohai Bank Yang Linlin; Wang Jiamin; Yu Junwei; Wang Ning; Yin Na; Wang Qian; Liu Liwen; Zhang Xiaoting; Chen Liyi (c); Yao Di; Li Ying

== Awards ==
- Most Valuable Player

(Senegal) Fatou Diouck (Supreme Chonburi)

- Popular Player

(Kazakhstan) Sana Anarkulova (Altay)

- Best Setter

(China) Yao Di (Tianjin Bohai Bank)

- Best Outside Spikers

(Thailand) Chatchu-on Moksri (Supreme Chonburi)
(Kazakhstan) Inna Matveyeva (Altay)

- Best Middle Blockers

(Thailand) Pleumjit Thinkaow (Supreme Chonburi)
(Kazakhstan) Kristina Anikonova (Altay)

- Best Opposite Spiker

(Japan) Akane Ukishima (Hisamitsu Springs)

- Best Libero

(Japan) Mana Toe (Hisamitsu Springs)
