= 2012 Asian Women's Club Volleyball Championship =

2012 Asian Club Championship

Tournament details
- Host country: Thailand
- Dates: 21–29 April
- Teams: 10
- Venue: 1 (in 1 host city)

Final positions
- Champions: (China) Tianjin Bridgestone (4th title)

Tournament awards
- MVP: (China) Yin Na

The 2012 Asian Women’s Club Volleyball Championship was the 13th staging of the AVC Club Championships. The tournament was held in Nakhon Ratchasima, Thailand.

== Pools composition ==
The teams are seeded based on their final ranking at the 2011 Asian Women's Club Volleyball Championship.

Pool A	Pool B
Thailand (Host & 1st); Vietnam (4th); Myanmar; Iran; Japan	China (2nd); Kazakhstan (3rd); Malaysia; Sri Lanka; ~~Kuwait~~ *

* Withdrew

== Preliminary round ==
=== Pool A ===
Pos	Team	Pld	W	L	Pts	SW	SL	SR	SPW	SPL	SPR	Qualification
1	(Japan) Toray Arrows	4	4	0	11	12	2	6.000	327	224	1.460	Quarterfinals
2	(Thailand) Chang	4	3	1	10	11	3	3.667	332	240	1.383	Quarterfinals
3	(Iran) Giti Pasand Isfahan	4	2	2	6	6	7	0.857	269	285	0.944	Quarterfinals
4	(Vietnam) VTV Bình Điền Long An	4	1	3	3	4	9	0.444	259	296	0.875	Quarterfinals
5	(Myanmar) Asia World	4	0	4	0	0	12	0.000	158	300	0.527	Play-off

Date	Time		Score		Set 1	Set 2	Set 3	Set 4	Set 5	Total	Report
21 Apr	14:00	VTV Bình Điền Long An (Vietnam)	3–0	(Myanmar) Asia World	25–14	25–13	25–21			75–48	Report
21 Apr	18:00	Chang (Thailand)	2–3	(Japan) Toray Arrows	25–27	21–25	25–14	25–21	11–15	107–102	Report
22 Apr	14:00	Giti Pasand Isfahan (Iran)	3–0	(Myanmar) Asia World	25–23	25–11	25–16			75–50	Report
22 Apr	18:00	Toray Arrows (Japan)	3–0	(Vietnam) VTV Bình Điền Long An	25–17	25–17	25–12			75–46	Report
23 Apr	16:00	Giti Pasand Isfahan (Iran)	0–3	(Japan) Toray Arrows	16–25	17–25	15–25			48–75	Report
23 Apr	18:00	Chang (Thailand)	3–0	(Vietnam) VTV Bình Điền Long An	25–16	25–20	25–17			75–53	Report
24 Apr	14:00	Asia World (Myanmar)	0–3	(Japan) Toray Arrows	10–25	4–25	9–25			23–75	Report
24 Apr	18:00	Chang (Thailand)	3–0	(Iran) Giti Pasand Isfahan	25–11	25–19	25–18			75–48	Report
25 Apr	16:00	VTV Bình Điền Long An (Vietnam)	1–3	(Iran) Giti Pasand Isfahan	25–23	18–25	23–25	19–25		85–98	Report
25 Apr	18:00	Asia World (Myanmar)	0–3	(Thailand) Chang	7–25	16–25	14–25			37–75	Report

=== Pool B ===
Pos	Team	Pld	W	L	Pts	SW	SL	SR	SPW	SPL	SPR	Qualification
1	(China) Tianjin Bridgestone	3	3	0	8	9	2	4.500	257	145	1.772	Quarterfinals
2	(Kazakhstan) Zhetyssu Almaty	3	2	1	7	8	3	2.667	249	174	1.431	Quarterfinals
3	(Malaysia) Santa Barbara Polo & Racquet	3	1	2	3	3	7	0.429	150	226	0.664	Quarterfinals
4	(Sri Lanka) SLBFE	3	0	3	0	1	9	0.111	134	245	0.547	Play-off

Date	Time		Score		Set 1	Set 2	Set 3	Set 4	Set 5	Total	Report
21 Apr	12:00	Santa Barbara (Malaysia)	3–1	(Sri Lanka) SLBFE	20–25	25–16	25–17	25–18		95–76	Report
21 Apr	16:00	Tianjin Bridgestone (China)	3–2	(Kazakhstan) Zhetyssu Almaty	25–20	25–18	22–25	20–25	15–11	107–99	Report
22 Apr	16:00	Santa Barbara (Malaysia)	0–3	(China) Tianjin Bridgestone	12–25	5–25	4–25			21–75	Report
23 Apr	14:00	SLBFE (Sri Lanka)	0–3	(China) Tianjin Bridgestone	7–25	9–25	9–25			25–75	Report
24 Apr	16:00	Zhetyssu Almaty (Kazakhstan)	3–0	(Malaysia) Santa Barbara	25–13	25–6	25–15			75–34	Report
25 Apr	14:00	Zhetyssu Almaty (Kazakhstan)	3–0	(Sri Lanka) SLBFE	25–11	25–13	25–9			75–33	Report

== Final round ==
Quarterfinals
27 April – Nakhon Ratchasima
(Thailand) Chang	3
(Malaysia) Santa Barbara	0
27 April – Nakhon Ratchasima
(China) Tianjin	3
(Vietnam) Bình Điền Long An	0
27 April – Nakhon Ratchasima
(Kazakhstan) Zhetyssu	3
(Iran) Giti Pasand	0
27 April – Nakhon Ratchasima
(Japan) Toray Arrows	3
(Myanmar) Asia World	0

Semifinals
28 April – Nakhon Ratchasima
(Thailand) Chang	0
(China) Tianjin	3
28 April – Nakhon Ratchasima
(Kazakhstan) Zhetyssu	0
(Japan) Toray Arrows	3

Final
29 April – Nakhon Ratchasima
(China) Tianjin	3
(Japan) Toray Arrows	2
3rd place
29 April – Nakhon Ratchasima
(Thailand) Chang	3
(Kazakhstan) Zhetyssu	0

5th–8th places
28 April – Nakhon Ratchasima
(Malaysia) Santa Barbara	0
(Vietnam) Bình Điền Long An	3
28 April – Nakhon Ratchasima
(Iran) Giti Pasand	3
(Myanmar) Asia World	0

5th place
29 April – Nakhon Ratchasima
(Vietnam) Bình Điền Long An	3
(Iran) Giti Pasand	1
7th place
29 April – Nakhon Ratchasima
(Malaysia) Santa Barbara	2
(Myanmar) Asia World	3

=== Play-off ===
Date	Time		Score		Set 1	Set 2	Set 3	Set 4	Set 5	Total	Report
26 Apr	16:00	Asia World (Myanmar)	3–2	(Sri Lanka) SLBFE	25–18	22–25	20–25	28–26	15–11	110–105	Report

=== Quarterfinals ===
Date	Time		Score		Set 1	Set 2	Set 3	Set 4	Set 5	Total	Report
27 Apr	12:00	Zhetyssu Almaty (Kazakhstan)	3–0	(Iran) Giti Pasand Isfahan	25–21	25–8	25–13			75–42	Report
27 Apr	14:00	Tianjin Bridgestone (China)	3–0	(Vietnam) VTV Bình Điền Long An	25–17	25–12	25–13			75–42	Report
27 Apr	16:00	Toray Arrows (Japan)	3–0	(Myanmar) Asia World	25–6	25–11	25–7			75–24	Report
27 Apr	18:00	Chang (Thailand)	3–0	(Malaysia) Santa Barbara	25–14	25–9	25–12			75–35	Report

=== 5th–8th semifinals ===
Date	Time		Score		Set 1	Set 2	Set 3	Set 4	Set 5	Total	Report
28 Apr	12:00	Santa Barbara (Malaysia)	0–3	(Vietnam) VTV Bình Điền Long An	6–25	14–25	14–25			34–75	Report
28 Apr	14:00	Giti Pasand Isfahan (Iran)	3–0	(Myanmar) Asia World	25–14	25–19	25–18			75–51	

=== Semifinals ===
Date	Time		Score		Set 1	Set 2	Set 3	Set 4	Set 5	Total	Report
28 Apr	16:00	Zhetyssu Almaty (Kazakhstan)	0–3	(Japan) Toray Arrows	17–25	17–25	20–25			54–75	
28 Apr	18:00	Chang (Thailand)	0–3	(China) Tianjin Bridgestone	14–25	20–25	19–25			53–75	

=== 7th place ===
Date	Time		Score		Set 1	Set 2	Set 3	Set 4	Set 5	Total	Report
29 Apr	12:00	Santa Barbara (Malaysia)	2–3	(Myanmar) Asia World	13–25	21–25	25–18	25–23	11–15	95–106	Report

=== 5th place ===
Date	Time		Score		Set 1	Set 2	Set 3	Set 4	Set 5	Total	Report
29 Apr	14:00	VTV Bình Điền Long An (Vietnam)	3–1	(Iran) Giti Pasand Isfahan	26–24	25–14	16–25	25–17		92–80	Report

=== 3rd place ===
Date	Time		Score		Set 1	Set 2	Set 3	Set 4	Set 5	Total	Report
29 Apr	16:00	Chang (Thailand)	3–0	(Kazakhstan) Zhetyssu Almaty	25–21	25–10	25–18			75–49	Report

=== Final ===
Date	Time		Score		Set 1	Set 2	Set 3	Set 4	Set 5	Total	Report
29 Apr	18:00	Tianjin Bridgestone (China)	3–2	(Japan) Toray Arrows	21–25	25–18	25–23	17–25	18–16	106–107	Report

== Final standing ==
Rank	Team
1st place, gold medalist(s)	(China) Tianjin Bridgestone
2nd place, silver medalist(s)	(Japan) Toray Arrows
3rd place, bronze medalist(s)	(Thailand) Chang
4	(Kazakhstan) Zhetyssu Almaty
5	(Vietnam) VTV Bình Điền Long An
6	(Iran) Giti Pasand Isfahan
7	(Myanmar) Asia World
8	(Malaysia) Santa Barbara Polo & Racquet
9	(Sri Lanka) SLBFE

Qualified for the 2012 Club World Championship

== Awards ==
- MVP: (China) Yin Na (Tianjin)
- Best scorer: (Japan) Arisa Takada (Toray Arrows)
- Best spiker: (China) Zhang Xiaoting (Tianjin)
- Best blocker: (China) Wang Ning (Tianjin)
- Best server: (Thailand) Nootsara Tomkom (Chang)
- Best setter: (China) Yao Di (Tianjin)
- Best libero: (China) Wang Qian (Tianjin)
