= Redheart =

Redheart or Red Heart may refer to:

== Plants ==
Redheart is a common name for several plants and may refer to:

- Ceanothus spinosus, a shrub native to southern California and northern Baja California
- Erythroxylon mexicanum, a tree native to Mexico
- Dysoxylum rufum, a rainforest tree in the Mahogany family
- Eucalyptus decipiens, a malle tree native to Western Australia

== Other ==
- red hearts, a playing card suit, see Playing card
- Red Heart (1999–2001), a joint venture between the Seven Network and Granada PLC
- The Red Hearts (U.S. band), a punk band
- Red Heart (rum), a Jamaican rum brand used in making the Mai Tai

== See also ==
- Big Red Heart (2010 song), Tracy Bonham song
- Kenshokai RedHearts, women's volleyball team
- Red (disambiguation)
- Heart (disambiguation)
