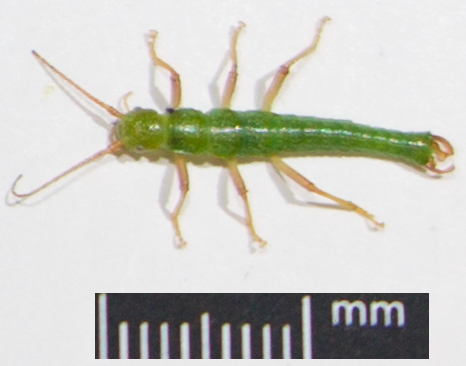

Scientific classification
- Kingdom: Animalia
- Phylum: Arthropoda
- Clade: Pancrustacea
- Class: Insecta
- Order: Phasmatodea
- Family: Timematidae
- Genus: Timema
- Species: T. cristinae

Binomial name
- Timema cristinae Vickery, 1993

= Timema cristinae =

Species of insect

Timema cristinae, or Cristina's timema, is a species of walking stick in the family Timematidae. This species is named in recognition of the person who first found and collected it, Cristina Sandoval. It is found in North America, in a small region of southern California, US. T. cristinae is one of the smallest species of stick insects. They are flightless, and feed on the shrubs on which they live.

== Description ==
T. cristinae is among the smallest species of stick insects, with adults only reaching 2-3cm in length. They have rounded bodies, an elongated abdomen, and are wingless. This species also displays sexual dimorphism. The males are smaller (~2cm long) and thinner than females (~3cm long), and can also be distinguished by their red legs. Males and females also differ in their mandible shape and size, with female mandibles being much longer than those of their male counterparts.

T. cristinae has a great sense of smell. This is known because it was found that they have more olfactory proteins than other species of phasmids that have been studied.

=== Morphs ===
T. cristinae is polymorphic in regard to both its body colour and pattern. At least four different morphs of T. cristinae have been described. The green morph (which has a green body with no pattern), the red morph (red body with no pattern), the grey morph (grey body with no pattern) and the striped morph, which has the same green body of the green morph, but also displays a white stripe down the length of its back. Although these morphs do differ in other characters, their most distinguishable differences are in their body colour and pattern (stripe or no stripe). There is also mention of a melanistic morph, which is dark brownish gray and unstriped, but it is unclear if this is a distinct morph or an alternate name for the gray morph. The green morph is pictured in the species box on the right side of this page.

== Distribution and habitat ==
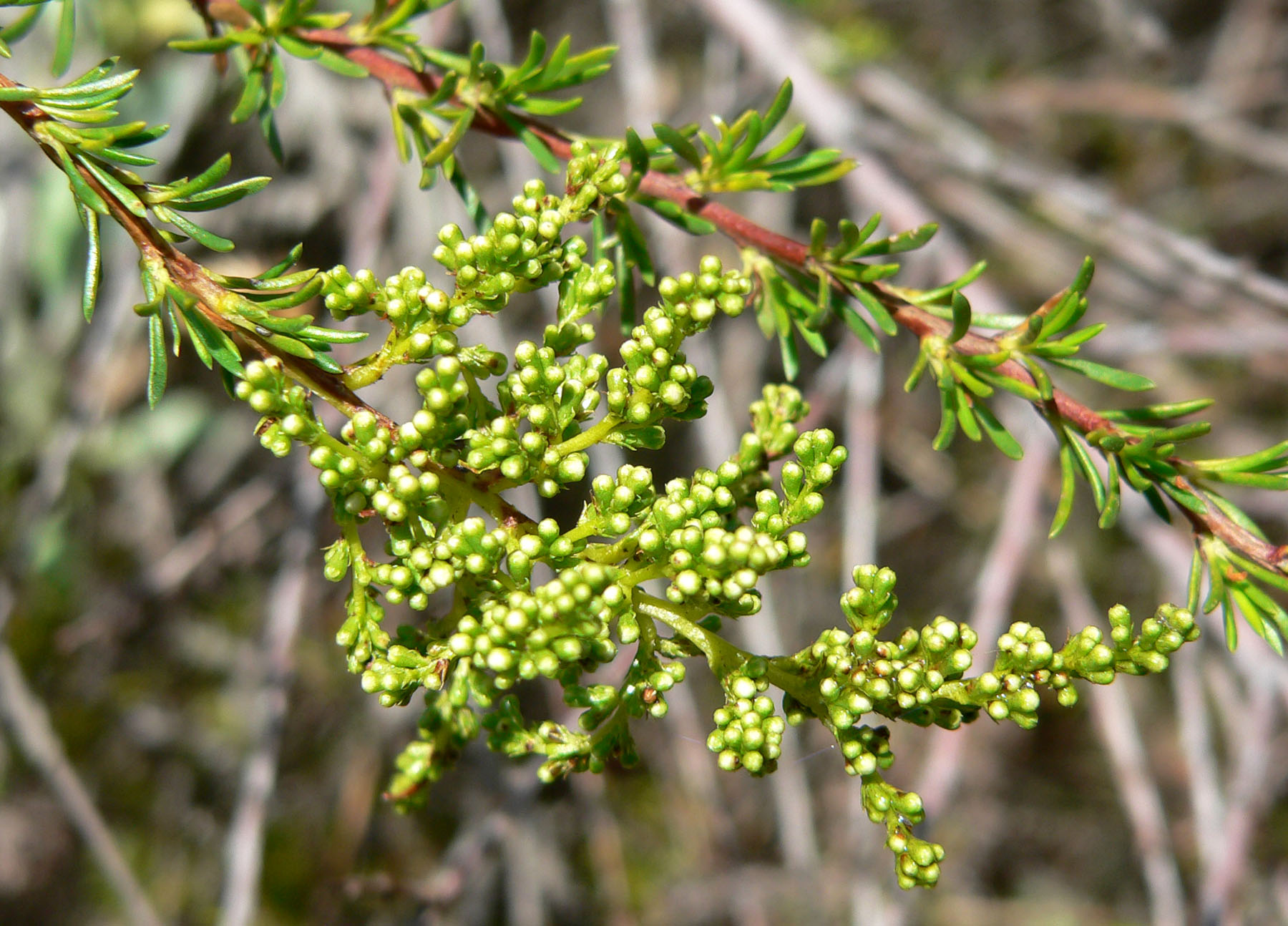
One of the host-plant species of T. cristinae, Adenostoma fasciculatum

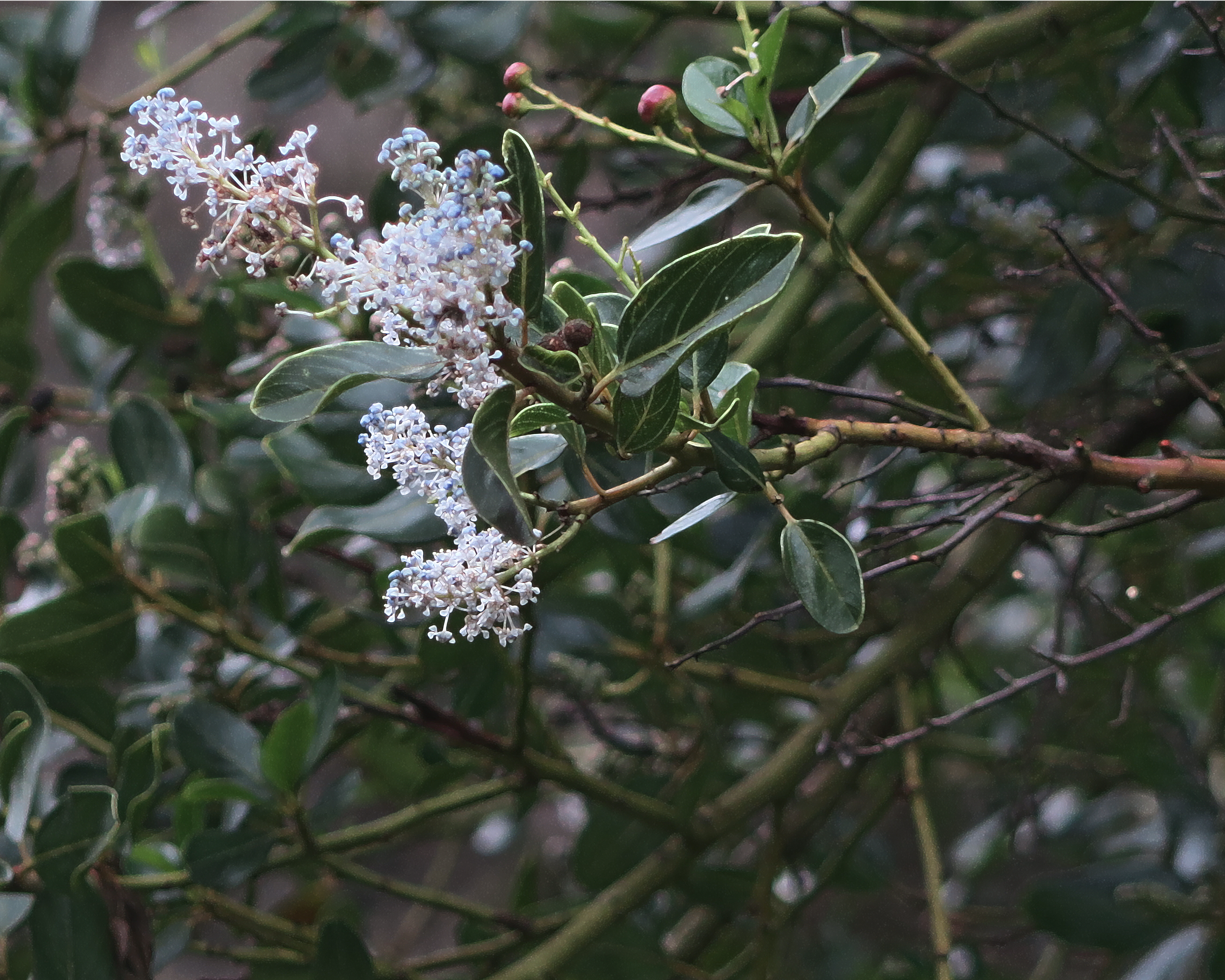
One of the host-plant species of T. cristinae, Ceanothus spinosus

This species is native to the Coast Range of southern California, US. It is exclusively found in a small region of mountainous habitat (~30km^{2}) covered by chaparral - a specific type of shrubland plant community. It is the only species of Timema found in this area. The specific habitat of T. cristinae is within shrubs. In particular, it is most abundant on two species of shrub: Adenostoma fasciculatum (Rosaceae) and Ceanothus spinosus (Rhamnaceae). These two plant species differ greatly in appearance, especially with regard to their leaves. The first (A. fasciculatum) has small needle-like leaves, that grow in crowded bundles along its branches. The second (C. spinosus) has wide oval-shaped leaves which do not grow so clustered together. These differences are likely responsible for two of the different morphs of T. cristinae: the 'green' morph and the 'striped' morph (which is also green, but displays a white stripe down its back). Studies have shown that the green morph is best camouflaged on the leaves of C. spinosus shrubs, whereas the striped morph is best camouflaged on the leaves of A. fasciculatum shrubs. Lastly, the melanistic morph is camouflaged to the stems of both of these host-plants, but very obvious when on the leaves of either.

== Reproduction ==
Females are able to reproduce throughout their lives, but lay just one egg at a time. When they lay their eggs, females ingest soil, which they then use to thoroughly coat the egg as it is laid. Interestingly, eggs which do not have access to soil will never hatch. Often eggs are simply dropped from the host-plants, although occasionally individuals will use their abdomens to insert them into the soil. Most eggs are laid in April and May, and go through a process of dormancy - termed diapause - where they delay development; this lasts for approximately 8 months until hatching begins in December. The eggs do not hatch all at once, but instead hatchings are scattered throughout December and January. Occasionally, some eggs will remain their dormant state for an additional year, waiting to hatch until the following December–January.

Mating in T. cristinae begins with the male climbing on top of the females abdomen. He then engages in courtship behaviours which involves leg and antenna waving, before attempting copulation. After males cease courtship, they remain motionless on the female's back. Matings in T. cristinae last several hours, after which time males will continue to ride on the females for hours or even days to prevent them from mating with other males. However this does not prevent females of T. cristinae from practicing polyandry, meaning females mate with multiple males.

== Behaviour ==
The juveniles and adults of T. cristinae remain motionless on their plants during the day, choosing to feed and walk only at night. When their host-plant is disturbed (as in shaking the branches), individuals often drop to the ground. One of the ways they avoid predators is through death-feigning behaviour. During this behaviour, the individual remains completely immobile. Not all individuals are equally likely to feign death, this behaviour is most commonly seen in smaller individuals.

== Ecology ==
Populations of T. cristinae have been demonstrated to be able to survive wildfires. This might be due to the unique way that females coat their eggs, by ingesting soil.

== Use in research ==
Due to its morphs, T. cristinae is used as an eco-evolutionary model to study the ongoing process of evolution. Much of this research has focused on the green and striped morphs, as they provide camouflage for two different host-plant species: C. spinosus and A. fasciculatum respectively. Essentially, as predators such as birds are able to more easily identify individuals of a certain morph when they are on the 'wrong' host-plant - the one they are not ideally camouflaged for - those individuals are less likely to survive. Researchers predict that this means that these two morphs are at the beginning of the speciation event, or in other words the green and striped morphs will become two different species of stick insects, which are best adapted to one or the other host-plant species. This has generated a lot of research interest, as it allows researchers to study the process of evolution in real time, instead of working backwards to figure how and why a species evolved into multiple different species. This interest has even led to studies examining the genes which decide which morph an individual will display (what colour and pattern they will have).

Additionally, although T. cristinae exists in only a small region (~30 km^{2}) there are some areas where only one of the two host-plant species is present, and other areas where the two host-plant species can be found right next to one another. These different types of areas allow researchers to study two different types of speciation. In areas with only one of the host-plant species, they are able to study allopatry, which is when the different groups (populations) are separated by a physical barrier, so they cannot reproduce with one another - in this case the areas with the other host-plant species are simply too far away. In areas where both host-plant species occur right next to each other, researchers can study parapatry - which is when groups (populations) of a species become two different species even though their habitats are only partially separated from one another. This means that members of the different groups are still able to reproduce with one another from time to time.
