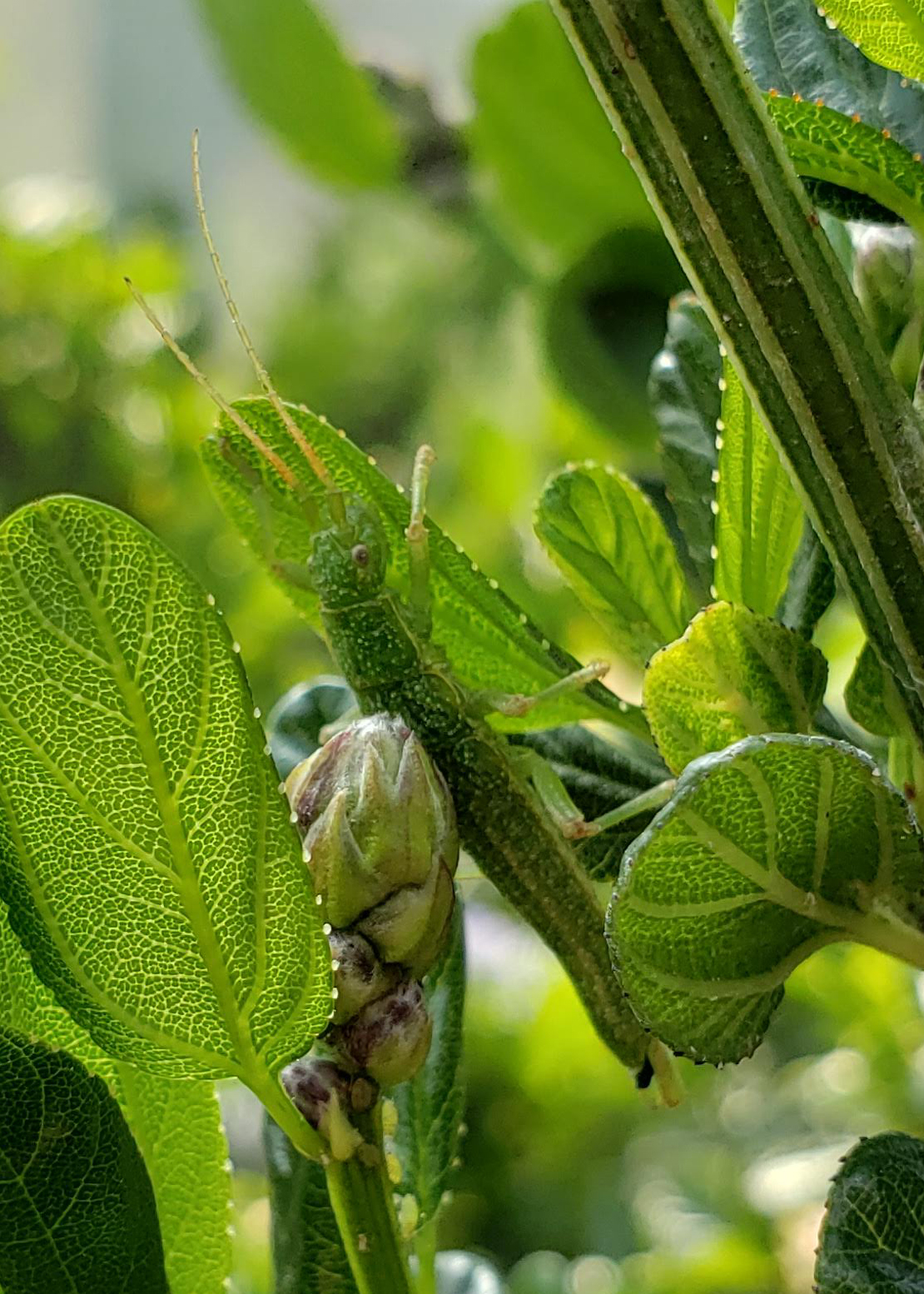

Scientific classification
- Domain: Eukaryota
- Kingdom: Animalia
- Phylum: Arthropoda
- Class: Insecta
- Order: Phasmatodea
- Family: Timematidae
- Genus: Timema
- Species: T. monikense

Binomial name
- Timema monikense Vickery & Sandoval, 1998

= Timema monikense =

Species of insect

Timema monikense, the Santa Monica Mountains timema, (originally Timema monikensis) is a parthenogenetic stick insect native to California.

== Distribution ==
The Santa Monica Mountains timema is endemic to the state of California in the United States. It can be found in Southern California, in the Santa Monica Mountain range, hence its common name.
