= Timema shepardi =

Scientific classification
- Domain: Eukaryota
- Kingdom: Animalia
- Phylum: Arthropoda
- Class: Insecta
- Order: Phasmatodea
- Family: Timematidae
- Genus: Timema
- Species: T. shepardi

Binomial name
- Timema shepardi Vickery & Sandoval, 1999

Synonyms
- Timema shepardii Vickery & Sandoval, 2001 (misspelling)

Species of stick insect

Timema shepardi, Shepard's Timema, is a stick insect native to northern California. It was first identified in 1999. It is one of five parthenogenetic species of Timema.
