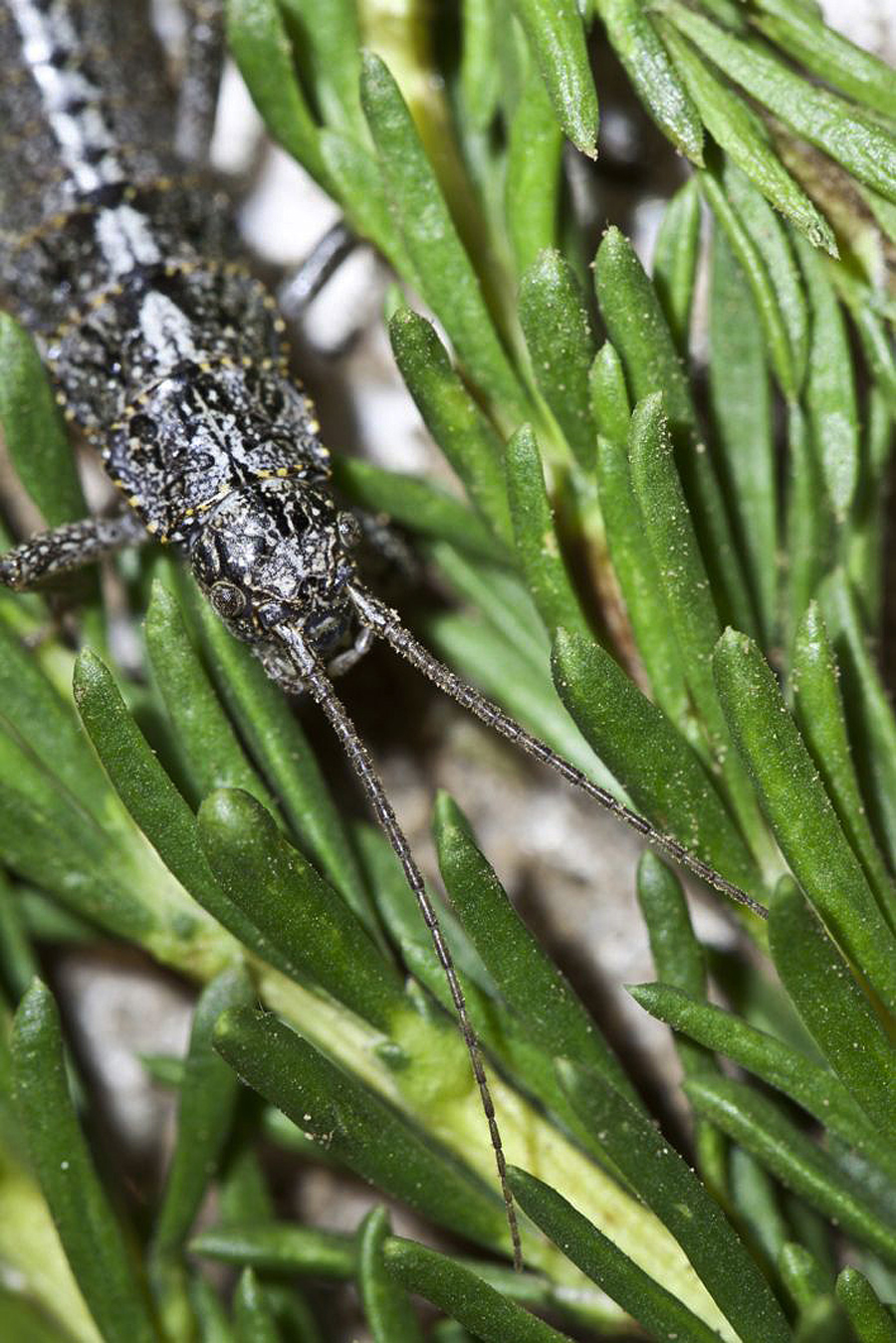

Scientific classification
- Domain: Eukaryota
- Kingdom: Animalia
- Phylum: Arthropoda
- Class: Insecta
- Order: Phasmatodea
- Family: Timematidae
- Genus: Timema
- Species: T. genevievae

Binomial name
- Timema genevievae Rentz, 1978

= Timema genevievae =

Species of insect

Timema genevievae, or Genevieve's timema, is a species of asexual walking-stick-like animal in the family Timematidae. It is found in North America.
