= Timema ritense =

Scientific classification
- Domain: Eukaryota
- Kingdom: Animalia
- Phylum: Arthropoda
- Class: Insecta
- Order: Phasmatodea
- Family: Timematidae
- Genus: Timema
- Species: T. ritense

Binomial name
- Timema ritense Hebard, 1937

Species of insect

Timema ritense, the Santa Rita timema, is a species of walkingstick in the family Timematidae. It is found in North America. The species was originally spelled "ritensis", but this spelling did not match the gender of the genus Timema, and therefore has undergone a mandatory change following ICZN Article 31.2.
