= Timema bartmani =

Scientific classification
- Domain: Eukaryota
- Kingdom: Animalia
- Phylum: Arthropoda
- Class: Insecta
- Order: Phasmatodea
- Family: Timematidae
- Genus: Timema
- Species: T. bartmani

Binomial name
- Timema bartmani Vickery & Sandoval, 1997

Species of stick insect

Timema bartmani, or Bartman's timema, is a species of stick insect in the family Timematidae. It is found in North America.
