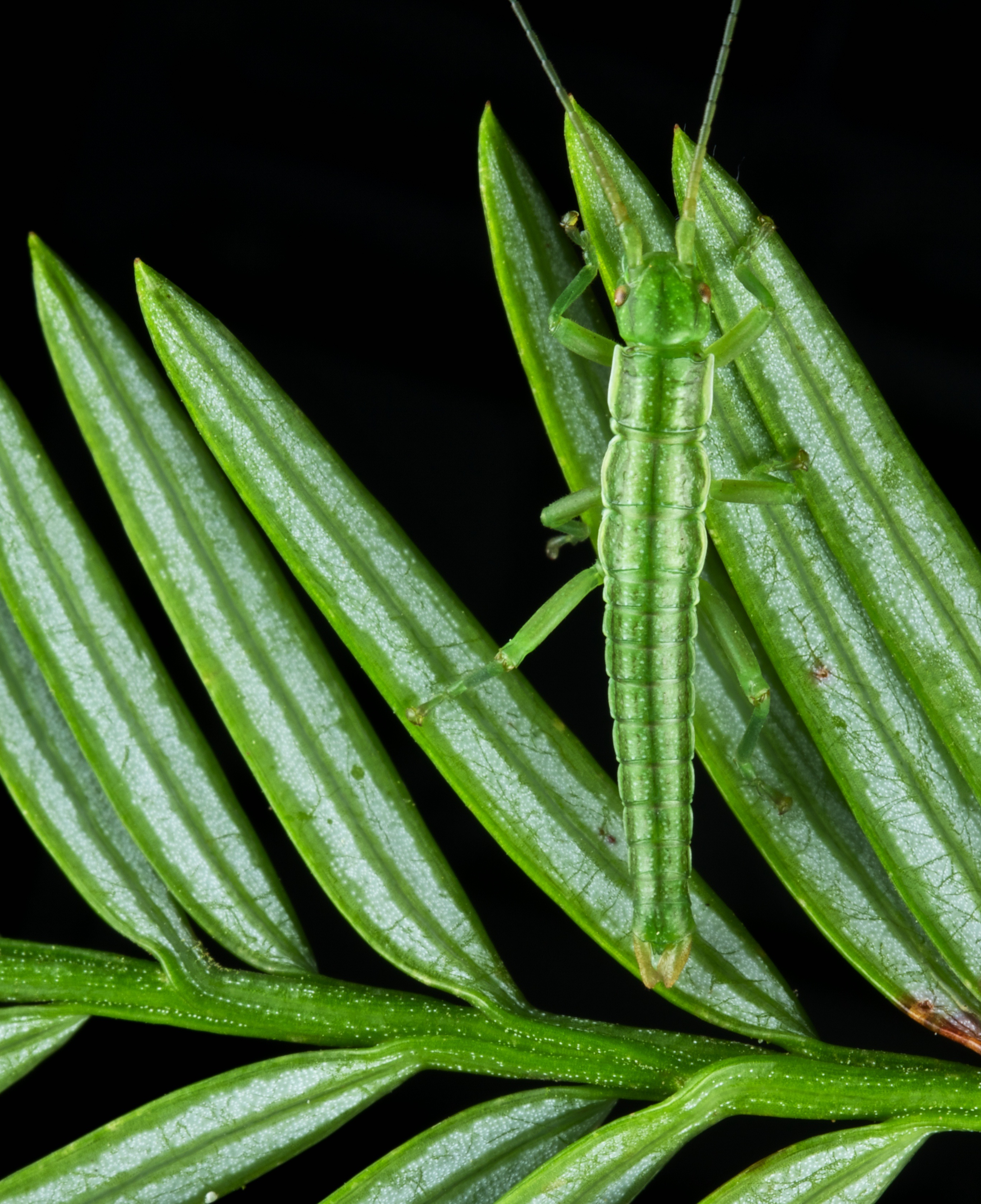

Scientific classification
- Domain: Eukaryota
- Kingdom: Animalia
- Phylum: Arthropoda
- Class: Insecta
- Order: Phasmatodea
- Family: Timematidae
- Genus: Timema
- Species: T. poppense

Binomial name
- Timema poppense Vickery & Sandoval, 1999

= Timema poppense =

Species of insect

Timema poppense (originally spelled "poppensis", but this spelling did not match the gender of the genus Timema, and therefore has undergone a mandatory change following ICZN Article 31.2), the "Pope Valley timema", is a species of walkingstick in the family Timematidae. It is found in California, and originally described from a nature reserve in the Pope Valley.
