= Timema nevadense =

Scientific classification
- Domain: Eukaryota
- Kingdom: Animalia
- Phylum: Arthropoda
- Class: Insecta
- Order: Phasmatodea
- Family: Timematidae
- Genus: Timema
- Species: T. nevadense

Binomial name
- Timema nevadense Strohecker, 1966

Species of insect

Timema nevadense, the Nevada timema, is a species of walkingstick in the family Timematidae. It is found in North America.
