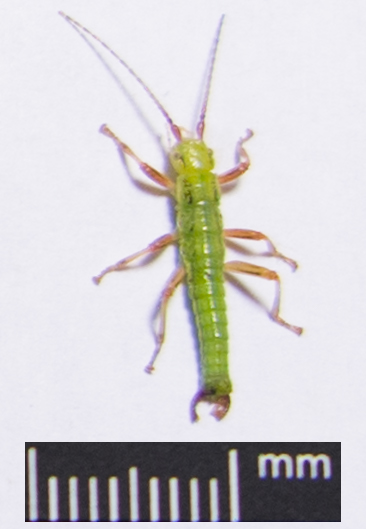

Scientific classification
- Domain: Eukaryota
- Kingdom: Animalia
- Phylum: Arthropoda
- Class: Insecta
- Order: Phasmatodea
- Family: Timematidae
- Genus: Timema
- Species: T. knulli

Binomial name
- Timema knulli Strohecker, 1951

= Timema knulli =

Species of insect

Timema knulli, Knull's Timema, is a stick insect native to California.
