= Pakistanis in Saudi Arabia =

Ethnic group in Saudi Arabia

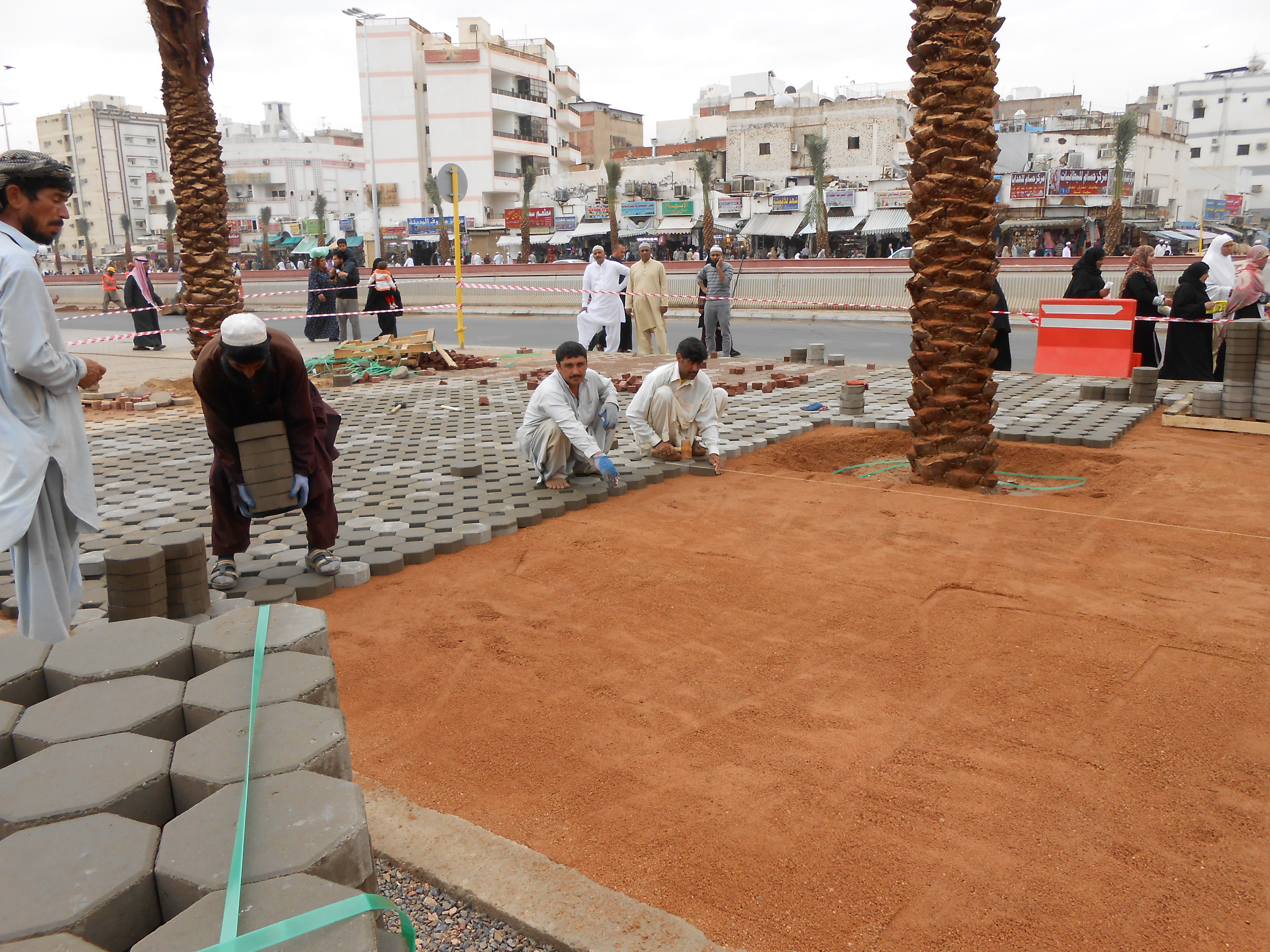
- Pakistani workers at Al Masjid Nabawi (the Prophet's Mosque) in Medina

Total population
- 2,640,000 (2023 census)

Regions with significant populations
- Riyadh, Khobar, Jeddah, Makkah, Jubail, Dammam, Jizan, Medina

Languages
- Urdu · Pashto · Punjabi · Hindko · Kashmiri · Sindhi · Arabic · Saraiki

Religion
- Islam

Pakistanis in Saudi Arabia are either Pakistani people who live in Saudi Arabia after having been born elsewhere, or are Saudi Arabian-born but have Pakistani roots. By Pakistani roots, this could mean roots linking back to Pakistan or Pakistani diaspora or South Asia. Many Pakistani army officers and soldiers also serve in Saudi Arabia and train the Saudi military cadets. According to a 2023 estimate, 2.64 million Pakistanis live and work in Saudi Arabia. The total number of Pakistanis who have migrated to Saudi Arabia since 1972 is approximately 7.69 million, most of them having returned after work.

== Society ==
=== Culture ===
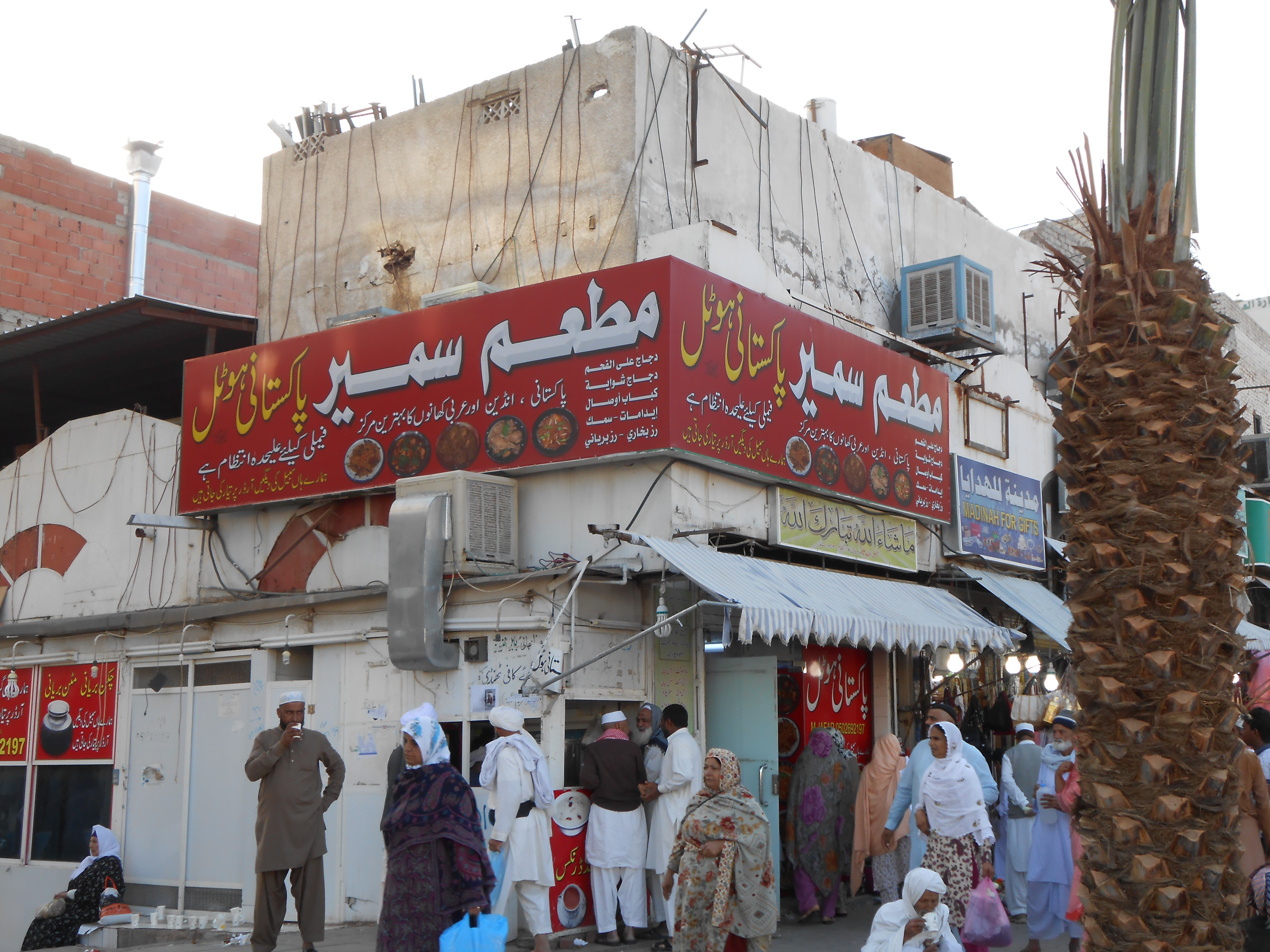
A Pakistani hotel in Medina

There are numerous restaurants, shops and cultural activities in Saudi Arabia which cater to the Pakistani diaspora. In Jeddah's Azizia district, a large Pakistani community is present due the close proximity of Pakistan International School in Jeddah. Azizia district is home to numerous Pakistani food outlets and shops. Sharfia and Baghdadia are other districts with significant Pakistani communities. Similarly, Al Shemaisy and Al Manfuha are areas with a substantial number of amenities related to the Pakistani community i.e. Pakistani food outlets, embroidery, groceries, etc. A Pakistani diaspora exists on a smaller scale throughout Saudi Arabia.

=== Economic contributions ===
Numerous Pakistani entrepreneurs have established successful ventures in Saudi Arabia. Notable examples include Abdul Kabeer Shah, a native of Landhi in Karachi who began his career as a laborer in the kingdom and later founded a successful fast-food chain, Alta’am ("Taste"). In April 2025, a delegation of some 20 Pakistani-origin businessmen based in Saudi Arabia attended the inaugural Overseas Pakistanis Convention in Islamabad. Organized by Pakistan's Ministry of Overseas Pakistanis, the event aimed to acknowledge the contributions of expatriates to the national economy and address their concerns. The businessmen expressed interest in investing in Pakistan's tourism infrastructure, agriculture, food processing, and general trading sectors. Faisal Tahir Khan, a Saudi-born Pakistani businessman, highlighted plans by the Pakistan Investment Forum (PIF) to establish a commercial hub in Saudi Arabia to promote the top 100 Pakistani brands.

Ali Khurshid Malik, another Pakistani businessman in Saudi Arabia and finance secretary of PIF, emphasized opportunities in Saudi Arabia's construction sector, particularly with projects like NEOM City. He noted the demand for Pakistani construction materials and skilled labor, especially in smart city technologies. Malik also pointed out the need for Pakistan to enhance its certification systems to supply certified skilled workers to the Kingdom.

In 2025, a significant number of Pakistani workers and professionals migrated to Saudi Arabia seeking employment and improved living conditions. According to official figures released by the Bureau of Emigration & Overseas Employment (BEOE), 530,256 Pakistanis relocated to various cities in the Kingdom during the year, marking a 17% increase compared with 452,562 in 2024. Saudi Arabia remains a primary destination for Pakistani labour due to expanding economic opportunities, especially in sectors requiring high-tech skills, driven by the Kingdom’s investments in large-scale projects and initiatives such as Saudi Vision 2030. Pakistani business groups, particularly in information technology and fintech, have increasingly established operations in the country, contributing to workforce relocation. In 2025, Pakistan’s total manpower exports to all countries reached 762,499, with Saudi Arabia accounting for about 69.5% of this total, up from 62% the prior year. Factors cited for the growth include strengthened bilateral relations, regulatory changes in other Gulf states prompting workforce shifts, and a 2025 defence cooperation agreement between Pakistan and Saudi Arabia.

=== Education ===
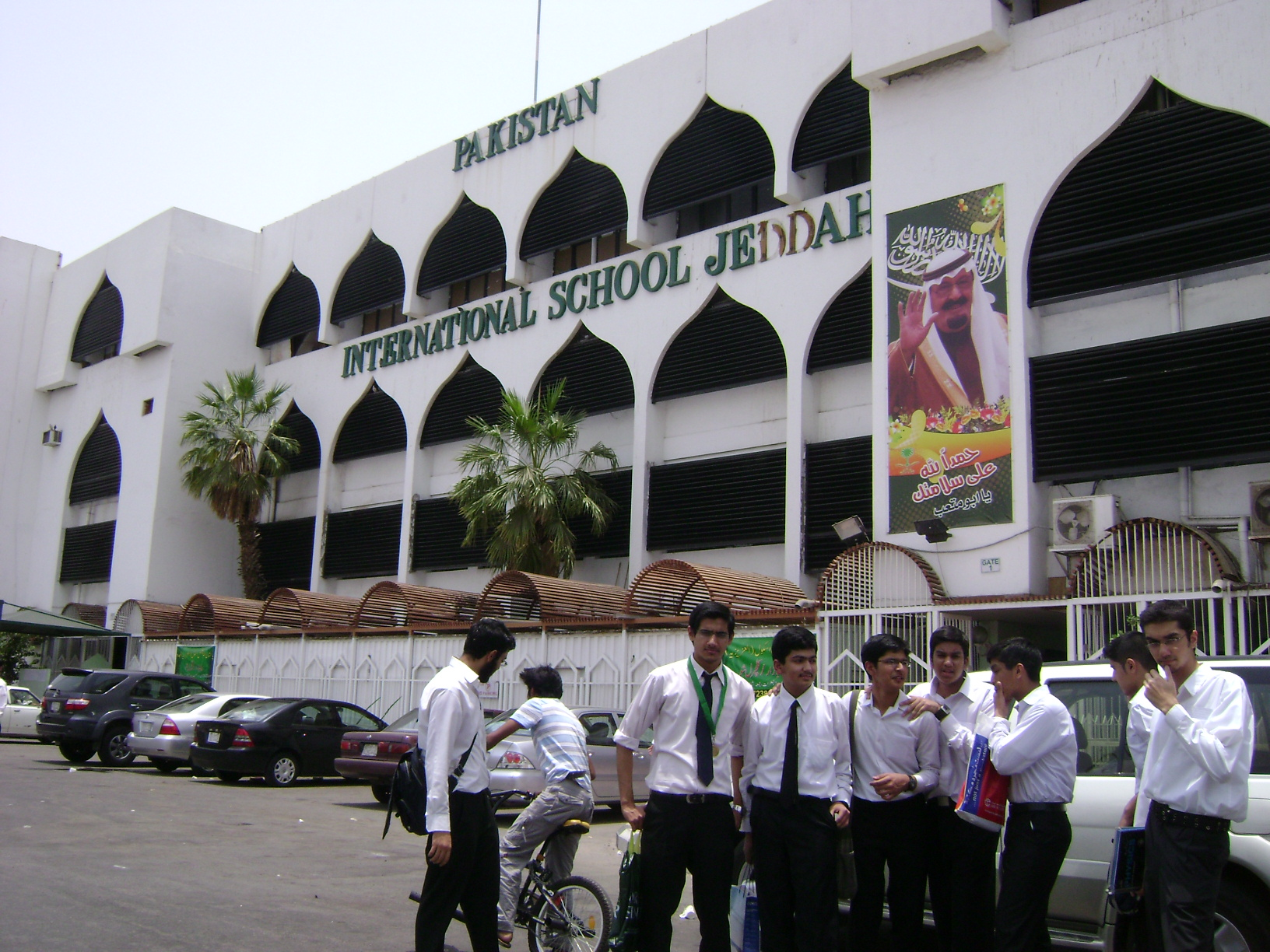
Pakistani male students (lower right) in front of their school, Pakistan International School Jeddah

To meet the requirement of the education, there are Pakistani schools in large cities of Saudi Arabia. They are known as International Schools with the name of the city comes after where the school is situated. They follow Pakistani national curriculum apart from Pakistan International School (English Section), Jeddah, which follow British Curriculum.

Riyadh: Pakistan International School, Riyadh - Largest School catering to Pakistani residents in Riyadh. Pakistan International School, English Section provides IGCSE and A-Level education to the Pakistani community

Jeddah: Pakistan International School, Jeddah and Pakistan International School (English Section), Jeddah

Jubail: Pakistan International School, Jubail

Taif: Pakistan International School, Taif

Al-Hassa: Pakistan International School, Al-Hasa

Al-Khobar: Pakistan International School, Al-Khobar

Al-Madina Al-Aqeeq international school, Al-Madina There are many private schools which cater to other educational needs of students.

== Notable Pakistanis in Saudi Arabia ==
- In 1957, Pakistani expatriate Anwar Ali became the governor of SAMA (Saudi Arabian Monetary Fund), who had come to the country with an International Monetary Fund mission and who held the post as a confidant of King Faisal until his death, in 1974.
- Nawaz Sharif - spent eight years in self exile upon an agreement with Pervez Musharraf and Saad Hariri. Returned to Pakistan in 2007.
- General Raheel Shareef - Ex-Chief Of Army Staff, Pakistan is currently the chief of Joint Islamic Forces, Saudi Arabia.

=== Saudi citizens of Pakistani descent ===
- Ghulam Akbar Khan Niazi, military physician
- Umer Chapra, economist
- Abdullah Alam Rashid, Ministry of Agriculture a Punjabi-Pakistani Civil Engineer who helped build and map Saudi roadways connecting Riyadh to Jeddah in the early 1900s. Alam Rashid created and mapped the roadways and major connections between two of the most populous cities in the Kingdom leading to the discovery of habitat, natural resources and settlements. In recognition of his services to the Kingdom, he was granted citizenship and the highest civilian honor for his services.

== Deportation ==
Reportedly, in four months from late 2016 to early 2017, Saudi Arabia deported at least 40,000 Pakistani nationals due to visa issues and violation of the rules of residence and work. In addition, an estimated 250,000 Pakistanis have been deported from various countries in a three year period from 2012 to 2015. Of them, 131,643 were deported from Saudi Arabia.

== Media ==
Urdu News targets Pakistanis living in Saudi Arabia, providing them news in their national language, Urdu. Bazm E Shaheen is also a community run organization which organizes events for the Pakistani community in Saudi Arabia.

== See also ==
- Pakistan – Saudi Arabia relations
- Foreign workers in Saudi Arabia
- Migrant workers in the Gulf Cooperation Council region
  - Treatment of South Asian labourers in the Gulf Cooperation Council region
