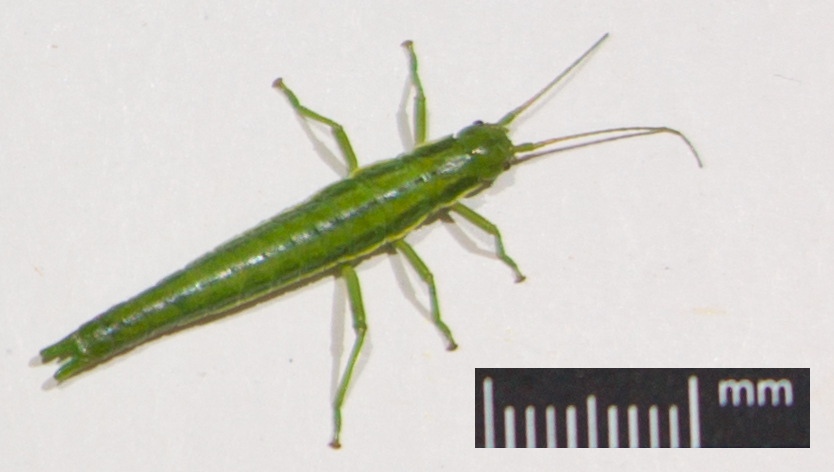

Scientific classification
- Domain: Eukaryota
- Kingdom: Animalia
- Phylum: Arthropoda
- Class: Insecta
- Order: Phasmatodea
- Family: Timematidae
- Genus: Timema
- Species: T. douglasi

Binomial name
- Timema douglasi Sandoval and Vickery, 1996

= Timema douglasi =

Species of stick insect

Timema douglasi is a stick insect native to northern California and southern Oregon, United States. It was first described in 1996 as a specialist feeder on old-growth Douglas fir. It is one of five parthenogenetic species in the genus Timema.
