= Timema podura =

Scientific classification
- Domain: Eukaryota
- Kingdom: Animalia
- Phylum: Arthropoda
- Class: Insecta
- Order: Phasmatodea
- Family: Timematidae
- Genus: Timema
- Species: T. podura

Binomial name
- Timema podura Strohecker, 1936

Species of insect

Timema podura, the Sierra Nevada timema, is a species of walkingstick in the family Timematidae. It is found in North America.
