= 2011 Asian Women's Club Volleyball Championship =

2011 Asian Club Championship
Tournament details
- Host country: Vietnam
- Dates: 19–25 June
- Teams: 8
- Venue: 1 (in 1 host city)

Final positions
- Champions: (Thailand) Chang (3rd title)

Tournament awards
- MVP: (Thailand) Wilavan Apinyapong

The 2011 Asian Women's Club Volleyball Championship was the 12th staging of the AVC Club Championships. The tournament was held in Vĩnh Phúc Gymnasium, Vĩnh Yên, Vĩnh Phúc Province, Vietnam.

== Pools composition ==
The teams are seeded based on their final ranking at the 2010 Asian Women's Club Volleyball Championship.

Pool A	Pool B
Vietnam (Host); Japan (3rd); Philippines; Iran	Thailand (1st); Kazakhstan (2nd); Indonesia; China

== Preliminary round ==
=== Pool A ===
Pos	Team	Pld	W	L	Pts	SW	SL	SR	SPW	SPL	SPR	Qualification
1	(Vietnam) Thông tin LienVietPostBank	3	3	0	9	9	0	MAX	225	149	1.510	Final round
2	(Japan) Kenshokai RedHearts	3	2	1	5	6	5	1.200	234	215	1.088	Final round
3	(Iran) Persepolis Tehran	3	1	2	4	5	6	0.833	227	217	1.046	Final round
4	(Philippines) Shakey's	3	0	3	0	0	9	0.000	120	225	0.533	Final round

Date	Time		Score		Set 1	Set 2	Set 3	Set 4	Set 5	Total	Report
19 Jun	14:00	Kenshokai RedHearts (Japan)	3–2	(Iran) Persepolis Tehran	23–25	25–17	19–25	25–16	15–10	107–93	Report
19 Jun	19:30	Thông tin LVPB (Vietnam)	3–0	(Philippines) Shakey's	25–12	25–18	25–8			75–38	Report
20 Jun	14:00	Thông tin LVPB (Vietnam)	3–0	(Japan) Kenshokai RedHearts	25–22	25–12	25–18			75–52	Report
20 Jun	19:00	Shakey's (Philippines)	0–3	(Iran) Persepolis Tehran	13–25	13–25	9–25			35–75	Report
21 Jun	14:00	Kenshokai RedHearts (Japan)	3–0	(Philippines) Shakey's	25–16	25–18	25–13			75–47	Report
21 Jun	19:00	Persepolis Tehran (Iran)	0–3	(Vietnam) Thông tin LVPB	23–25	19–25	17–25			59–75	Report

=== Pool B ===
Pos	Team	Pld	W	L	Pts	SW	SL	SR	SPW	SPL	SPR	Qualification
1	(China) Tianjin Bridgestone	3	2	1	7	8	4	2.000	276	234	1.179	Final round
2	(Thailand) Chang	3	2	1	6	7	4	1.750	257	229	1.122	Final round
3	(Kazakhstan) Zhetyssu Almaty	3	2	1	5	7	5	1.400	264	236	1.119	Final round
4	Garuda Indonesia	3	0	3	0	0	9	0.000	127	225	0.564	Final round

Date	Time		Score		Set 1	Set 2	Set 3	Set 4	Set 5	Total	Report
19 Jun	16:00	Garuda Indonesia	0–3	(Thailand) Chang	10–25	15–25	16–25			41–75	Report
19 Jun	21:00	Tianjin Bridgestone (China)	2–3	(Kazakhstan) Zhetyssu Almaty	15–25	25–20	25–21	18–25	13–15	96–106	Report
20 Jun	16:00	Garuda Indonesia	0–3	(China) Tianjin Bridgestone	13–25	11–25	13–25			37–75	Report
20 Jun	21:00	Chang (Thailand)	3–1	(Kazakhstan) Zhetyssu Almaty	25–23	16–25	25–17	25–18		91–83	Report
21 Jun	16:00	Zhetyssu Almaty (Kazakhstan)	3–0	Garuda Indonesia	25–14	25–16	25–19			75–49	Report
21 Jun	21:00	Tianjin Bridgestone (China)	3–1	(Thailand) Chang	23–25	32–30	25–20	25–16		105–91	Report

== Final round ==
Quarterfinals
23 June – Vĩnh Yên
(Vietnam) Thông tin LVPB	3
(Indonesia) Garuda	0
23 June – Vĩnh Yên
(Thailand) Chang	3
(Iran) Persepolis	0
23 June – Vĩnh Yên
(China) Tianjin	3
(Philippines) Shakey's	0
23 June – Vĩnh Yên
(Japan) Kenshokai	0
(Kazakhstan) Zhetyssu	3

Semifinals
24 June – Vĩnh Yên
(Vietnam) Thông tin LVPB	2
(Thailand) Chang	3
24 June – Vĩnh Yên
(China) Tianjin	3
(Kazakhstan) Zhetyssu	1

Final
25 June – Vĩnh Yên
(Thailand) Chang	3
(China) Tianjin	0
3rd place
25 June – Vĩnh Yên
(Vietnam) Thông tin LVPB	0
(Kazakhstan) Zhetyssu	3

5th–8th places
24 June – Vĩnh Yên
(Philippines) Shakey's	0
(Japan) Kenshokai	3
24 June – Vĩnh Yên
(Indonesia) Garuda	1
(Iran) Persepolis	3

5th place
25 June – Vĩnh Yên
(Japan) Kenshokai	3
(Iran) Persepolis	0
7th place
25 June – Vĩnh Yên
(Philippines) Shakey's	1
(Indonesia) Garuda	3

=== Quarterfinals ===
Date	Time		Score		Set 1	Set 2	Set 3	Set 4	Set 5	Total	Report
23 Jun	14:00	Tianjin Bridgestone (China)	3–0	(Philippines) Shakey's	25–12	25–14	25–17			75–43	Report
23 Jun	16:00	Kenshokai RedHearts (Japan)	0–3	(Kazakhstan) Zhetyssu Almaty	21–25	22–25	12–25			55–75	Report
23 Jun	19:00	Chang (Thailand)	3–0	(Iran) Persepolis Tehran	25–19	25–15	25–12			75–46	Report
23 Jun	21:00	Thông tin LVPB (Vietnam)	3–0	Garuda Indonesia	25–13	25–4	25–19			75–36	Report

=== 5th–8th semifinals ===
Date	Time		Score		Set 1	Set 2	Set 3	Set 4	Set 5	Total	Report
24 Jun	14:00	Shakey's (Philippines)	0–3	(Japan) Kenshokai RedHearts	24–26	12–25	19–25			55–76	Report
24 Jun	16:00	Garuda Indonesia	1–3	(Iran) Persepolis Tehran	16–25	25–22	13–25	18–25		72–97	Report

=== Semifinals ===
Date	Time		Score		Set 1	Set 2	Set 3	Set 4	Set 5	Total	Report
24 Jun	19:00	Thông tin LVPB (Vietnam)	2–3	(Thailand) Chang	25–21	25–21	14–25	16–25	10–15	90–107	Report
24 Jun	21:00	Tianjin Bridgestone (China)	3–1	(Kazakhstan) Zhetyssu Almaty	25–20	25–20	16–25	25–23		91–88	Report

=== 7th place ===
Date	Time		Score		Set 1	Set 2	Set 3	Set 4	Set 5	Total	Report
25 Jun	14:00	Shakey's (Philippines)	1–3	Garuda Indonesia	22–25	17–25	28–26	18–25		85–101	Report

=== 5th place ===
Date	Time		Score		Set 1	Set 2	Set 3	Set 4	Set 5	Total	Report
25 Jun	16:00	Kenshokai RedHearts (Japan)	3–0	(Iran) Persepolis Tehran	25–20	25–19	26–24			76–63	Report

=== 3rd place ===
Date	Time		Score		Set 1	Set 2	Set 3	Set 4	Set 5	Total	Report
25 Jun	19:00	Thông tin LVPB (Vietnam)	0–3	(Kazakhstan) Zhetyssu Almaty	23–25	29–31	16–25			68–81	Report

=== Final ===
Date	Time		Score		Set 1	Set 2	Set 3	Set 4	Set 5	Total	Report
25 Jun	21:00	Chang (Thailand)	3–0	(China) Tianjin Bridgestone	25–19	25–19	25–20			75–58	Report

== Final standing ==
Rank	Team
1st place, gold medalist(s)	(Thailand) Chang
2nd place, silver medalist(s)	(China) Tianjin Bridgestone
3rd place, bronze medalist(s)	(Kazakhstan) Zhetyssu Almaty
4	(Vietnam) Thông tin LienVietPostBank
5	(Japan) Kenshokai RedHearts
6	(Iran) Persepolis Tehran
7	Garuda Indonesia
8	(Philippines) Shakey's

Qualified for the 2011 Club World Championship

== Awards ==
- MVP: (Thailand) Wilavan Apinyapong (Chang)
- Best scorer: (Kazakhstan) Lyudmila Anarbayeva (Zhetyssu)
- Best spiker: (China) Yin Na (Tianjin)
- Best blocker: (Vietnam) Phạm Thị Kim Huệ (Thông tin LVPB)
- Best server: (Thailand) Nootsara Tomkom (Chang)
- Best setter: (China) Yao Di (Tianjin)
- Best libero: (Thailand) Piyanut Pannoy (Chang)
