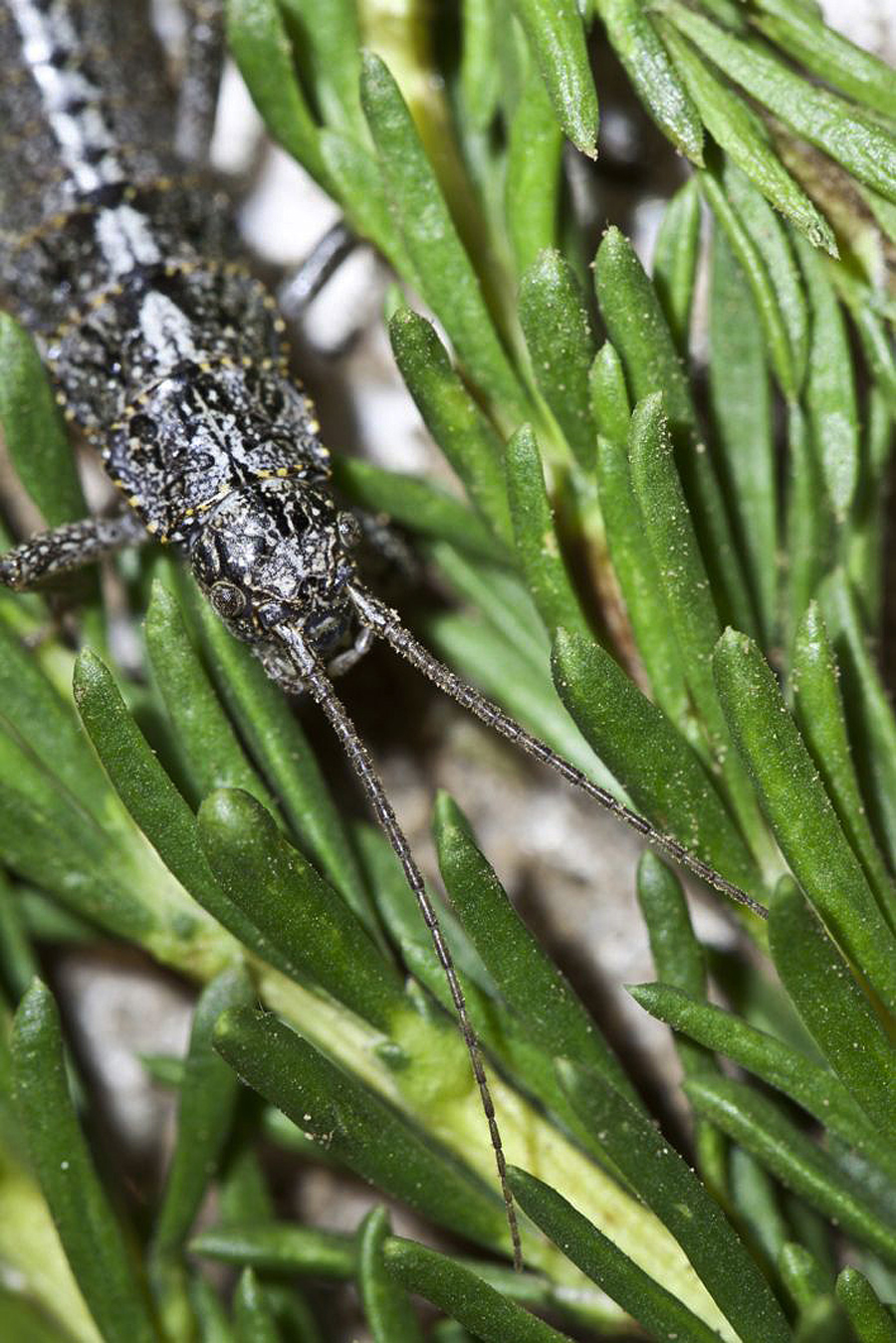
- Timema genevievae on the leaves of chamise (Adenostoma fasciculatum).

Scientific classification
- Kingdom: Animalia
- Phylum: Arthropoda
- Clade: Pancrustacea
- Class: Insecta
- Order: Phasmatodea
- Family: Timematidae
- Genus: Timema; Scudder, 1895

Species
- 21, and see text
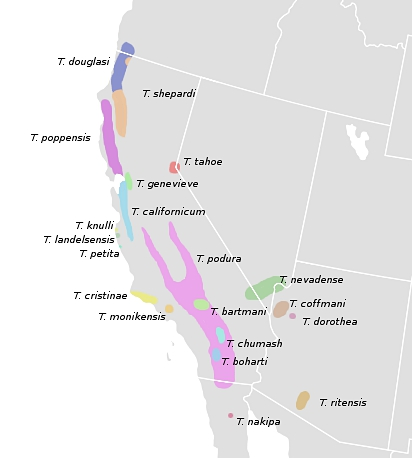
- Geographical distribution of Timema species in North America (Law & Crespi, 2002). T. morongense is found west of T. chumash but the extent of its full range is unknown.

= Timema =

Genus of stick insects

Timema is a genus of relatively short-bodied, stout and wingless stick insects native to the far western United States, and the sole extant member of the family Timematidae. The genus was first described in 1895 by Samuel Hubbard Scudder, based on observations of the species Timema californicum.

The genus Timema is considered to be the sister group to all other stick insects. To emphasize this outgroup status, all stick insects not included in Timema are sometimes described as "Euphasmatodea."

Five of the twenty-one species of Timema are parthenogenetic, including two species that have not engaged in sexual reproduction for one million years, the longest known asexual period for any insect.

== Description ==
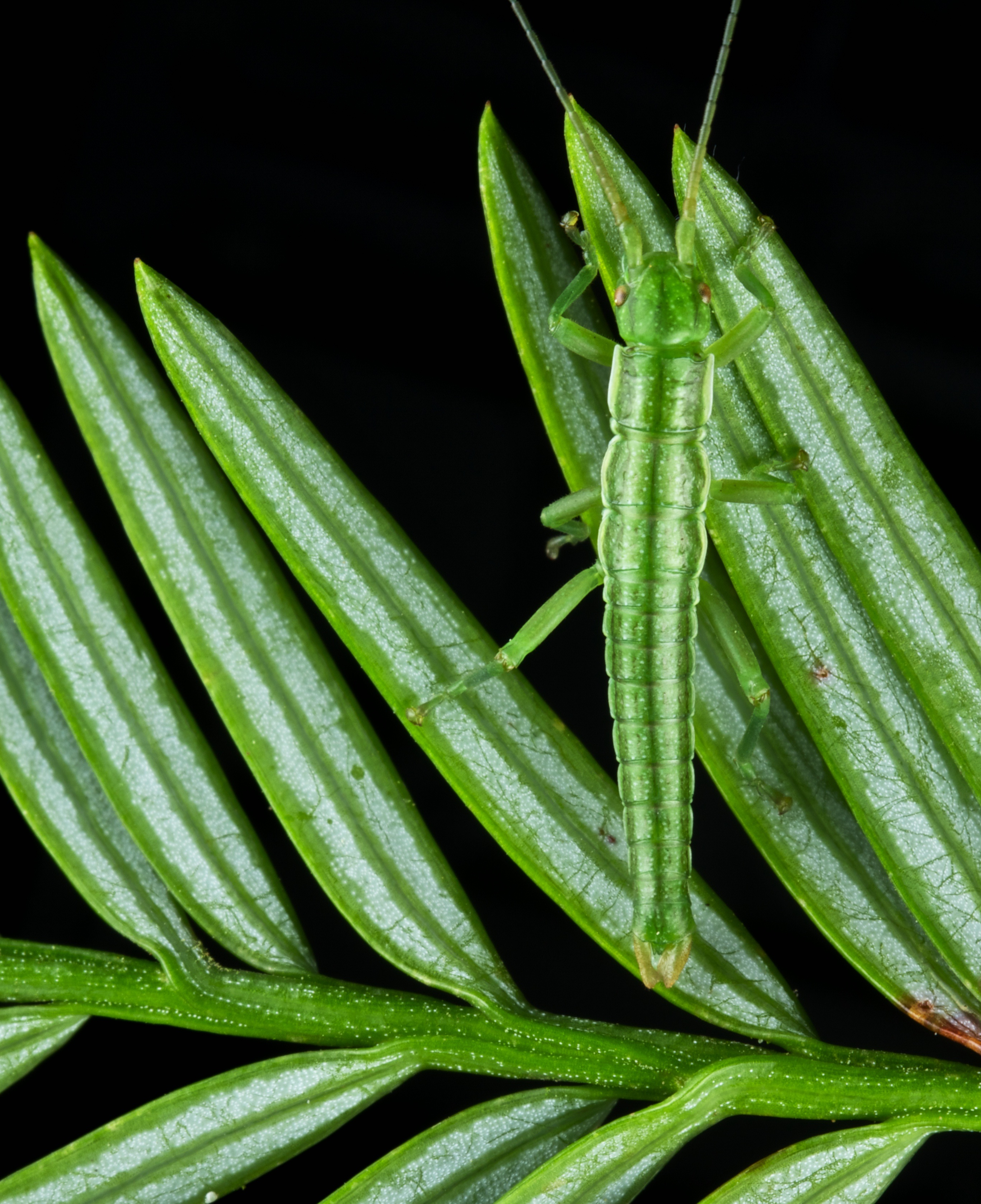
Timema poppense camouflaged on its host, Sequoia sempervirens (Redwood)

Timema spp. differ from other Phasmatodea in that their tarsi have three segments rather than five. For stick insects, they have relatively small, stout bodies, so that they look somewhat like earwigs (order Dermaptera).

=== Cryptic coloration and camouflage ===
Timema walking sticks are night-feeders who spend daytime resting on the leaves or bark of the plants they feed on. Timema colors (primarily green, gray, or brown) and patterns (which may be stripes, scales, or dots) match their typical background, a form of crypsis.

In 2008, researchers studying the presence or absence of a dorsal stripe suggested that it has independently evolved several times in Timema species and is an adaptation for crypsis on needle-like leaves. All of the eight Timema species with a dorsal stripe have at least one host plant with needle-like foliage. Of the thirteen unstriped species, seven feed only on broadleaf plants. Four (T. ritense, T. podura, T. genevievae, and T. coffmani) rest during the day on the host plant's trunk rather than its leaves and have bodies that are brown, gray, or tan. Only two species (T. nakipa and T. boharti) have green unstriped morphs that feed on needle-like foliage; both are generalist feeders that also feed on broadleaf hosts.

The species Timema cristinae exhibit striped, unstriped, and melanistic coloration depending on the host plant, a form of polymorphism that clearly illustrates the camouflage function of the stripe. In 2020 it was discovered that mutation in the genes underlying coloration is still occurring, and so further color morphs are still evolving and the color morph most common to each species is still in flux. Research from 2018 suggests that the different body colors come in predictable "waves" where the rarest color morph in a population is selected for until it is common and vice versa. This may be due to differences in heat tolerance and/or predator search image preferences between the color morphs, but the exact cause is still unknown.

The earliest ancestors of this species were generalists that fed on plants belonging to both the genera Adenostoma and Ceanothus. They eventually diverged into two distinct ecotypes with a more specialist host plant preference. One ecotype prefers to feed on Adenostoma while the other ecotype prefers to feed on Ceanothus. The Adenostoma ecotype possesses a white dorsal stripe, an adaptation to blend in with the needle-like leaves of the plant, while the Ceanothus ecotype does not (Ceanothus spp. have broad leaves). The Adenostoma ecotype is also smaller, with a wider head, and shorter legs.

These characteristics are genetically inherited and has been interpreted as the early stages of the speciation process. The two ecotypes will eventually become separate species once reproductive isolation is achieved. At the moment, both ecotypes are still capable of interbreeding and producing viable offspring, as such they are still considered a single species.

=== Life cycle and reproduction ===
Timema eggs are soft, ellipsoidal, and about two mm long, with a lid-like structure at one end (the operculum) through which the nymph will emerge. Timema females use particles of dirt, which they have previously ingested, to coat their eggs.

The eggs of many stick insects, including Timema, are attractive to ants, who carry them away to their burrows to feed on the egg's capitulum, while leaving the rest of the egg intact to hatch. The emerging nymph passes through six or seven instars before reaching adulthood.

Timema males, in sexual species of Timema, show a consistent pattern of courting behavior. The male climbs onto the back of the female and, after a short display of vibrating and waving, they proceed to mate. (Rejection by the female is possible but uncommon.) The male then rides on the female's back for up to five days, a behavior often referred to as "guarding" the female.

Several species of Timema are parthenogenetic: that is, females can reproduce asexually, producing viable eggs without male participation.

According to Tanja Schwander, "Timema are indeed the oldest insects for which there is good evidence that they have been asexual for long periods of time." She heads a team of researchers who found that five Timema species (T. douglasi, T. monikense, T. shepardi, T. tahoe and T. genevievae) have used only asexual reproduction for more than 500,000 years, with T. tahoe and T. genevievae reproducing asexually for over one million years.

Genetic analysis, published in 2023, of four asexual Timema species suggested that males, which are rare but not entirely absent, do in fact engage in sexual reproduction with some females.

== Habitat ==
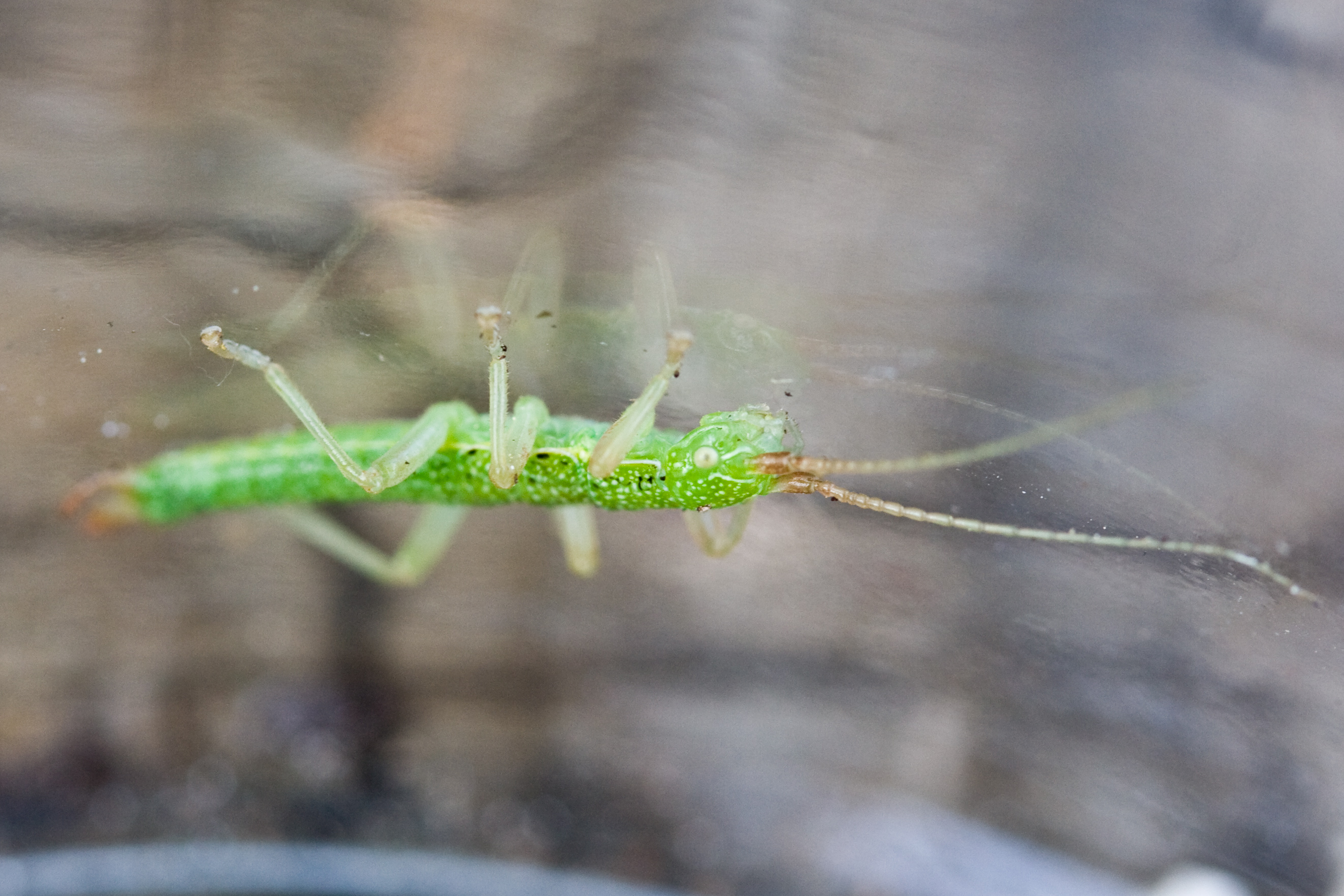
Male Timema (californicum or landelsense)

The geographic range of Timema is limited to mountainous regions of western North America between 30° and 42° N. They are found primarily in California, as well as in a few other neighboring states (Oregon, Nevada, Arizona) and in northern Mexico. All are herbivores, primarily feeding on host plants found in chaparral.

Host plants of the different Timema species include Pseudotsuga menziesii (Douglas fir), Sequoia sempervirens (Californian redwood), Arctostaphylos spp. (manzanita), Ceanothus spp., Adenostoma fasciculatum (chamise), Abies concolor (white fir), Quercus spp. (oak), Heteromeles arbutifolia (toyon), Cercocarpus spp. (mountain-mahogany), Eriogonum sp. (buckwheat), and Juniperus spp. (juniper).

== Phylogeny ==
General phylogenetic relationships within Timema (Law & Crespi, 2002). Species marked with ♀ are parthenogenetic (female only).

- ←
  - - Northern clade
      - Timema poppense
      - Timema californicum
      - Timema douglasi♀
      - Timema shepardi♀
      - Timema knulli
      - Timema petita
      - Timema landelsense
    - Santa Barbara clade
      - Timema cristinae
      - Timema monikense♀
  - - Southern clade
      - Timema podura
      - Timema genevievae♀
      - Timema bartmani
      - Timema tahoe♀
    - Timema boharti
  - Timema chumash
  - - Timema dorotheae
    - Timema ritense
  - Timema nakipa
  - Timema nevadense

== Classification ==
Timema is the only extant member of the family Timematidae and the suborder Timematodea. Their clade is considered basal to the order Phasmatodea; that is, many scientists believe that Timema-type stick insects represent the earliest "branch" to diverge from the phylogenetic tree that gave rise to all the stick insects of Phasmatodea. This primal distinction is referenced by the name "Euphasmatodea", which is given to all the clades of Phasmatodea other than the suborder Timematodea. While formerly the only member of the family, in 2019 two fossil genera were described from the Cenomanian aged Burmese amber of Myanmar.

Twenty-one species have been described; in addition there are at least two undescribed species known to exist:

- Timema bartmani
- Timema boharti
- Timema californicum
- Timema chumash
- Timema coffmani
- Timema cristinae
- Timema dorotheae
- Timema douglasi
- Timema genevievae
- Timema knulli
- Timema landelsense
- Timema monikense
- Timema morongense
- Timema nakipa
- Timema nevadense
- Timema petita
- Timema podura
- Timema poppense
- Timema ritense
- Timema shepardi
- Timema tahoe
- Timema sp. nov. on limber pine
- Timema sp. nov. on Sargent cypress

== See also ==
- Thelytoky
- Sexual dimorphism
- Evolutionary arms race
- Sexual conflict
