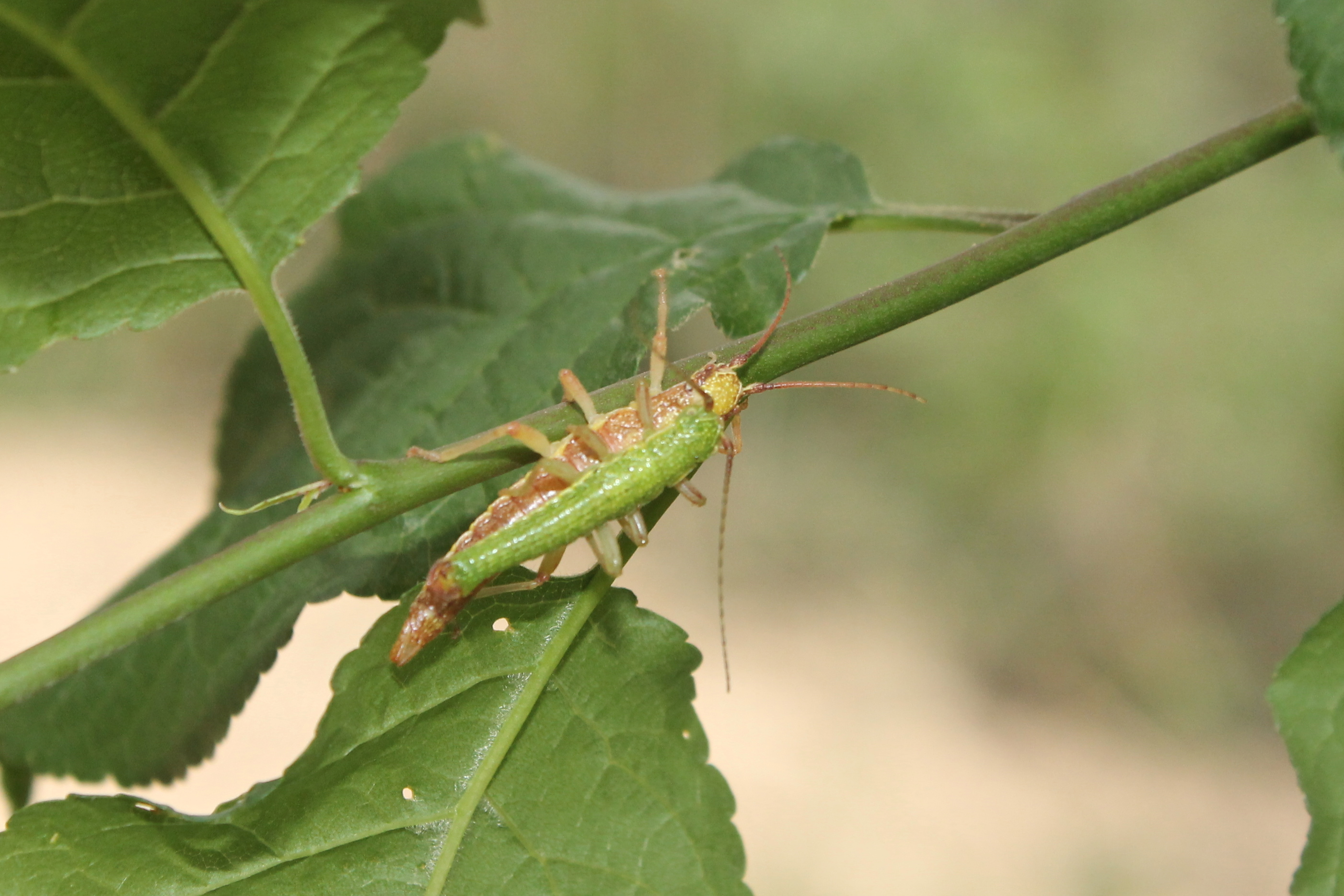

Scientific classification
- Kingdom: Animalia
- Phylum: Arthropoda
- Clade: Pancrustacea
- Class: Insecta
- Order: Phasmatodea
- Family: Timematidae
- Genus: Timema
- Species: T. californicum

Binomial name
- Timema californicum Scudder, 1895

= Timema californicum =

Species of insect

Timema californicum, the California timema, is a species of walkingstick in the family Timematidae. It is found in North America.
