= Lena Ustymenko =

Ukrainian volleyball player (born 1986)

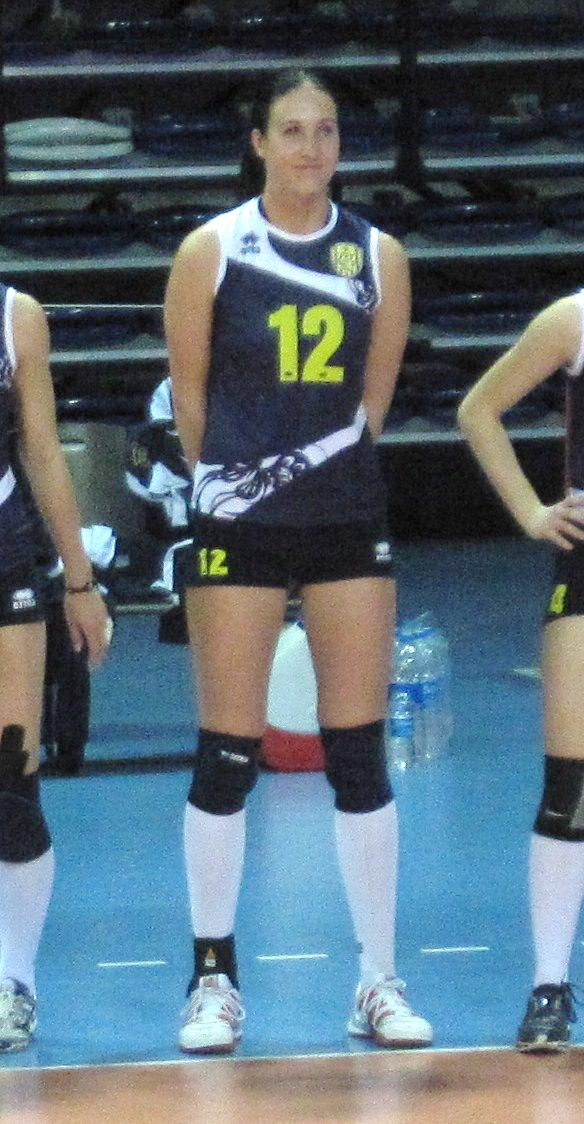

Personal information
- Full name: Olena Ustymenko Sokolowski
- Nationality: Ukrainian
- Born: October 11, 1986 (age 40)
- Height: 6 ft 4 in (192 cm)
- Weight: 172 lb (78 kg)
- Spike: 120 in (305 cm)
- Block: 118 in (300 cm)

Volleyball information
- Position: outside hitter
- Number: 6

Career
Years	Teams
2011	VakıfBank Türk Telekom Istanbul

Olena Ustymenko Sokolowski (born October 11, 1986) is a Ukrainian female volleyball player.

With her club VakıfBank Türk Telekom Istanbul she competed at the 2011 FIVB Volleyball Women's Club World Championship.
