= Sri Lanka Bureau of Foreign Employment =

The Sri Lanka Bureau of Foreign Employment (SLBFE) is a government agency of Sri Lanka, tasked with overseeing overseas employment of Sri Lankan Citizens and their welfare. It was established in 1985, under the provisions of the Sri Lanka Bureau of Foreign Employment Act. No. 21 of 1985 from which it derives its remit and powers.

== Duties ==
The SLBF regulates the following:

- Conditions for gaining a license to operate a foreign employment agency.
- Fees each worker going overseas for work needs to pay the SLBFE.
- The employment agreement for domestic sector employees.
- Manage the Workers Welfare Fund
- Welfare and protection of Sri Lankans working overseas.

== See also ==
- Migrant worker
- Bureau of Emigration and Overseas Employment
- Bangladesh Overseas Employment and Services Limited
- Philippine Overseas Employment Administration
