= Paulette García =

Puerto Rican volleyball player (born 1990)

Paulette Garcia

Personal information
- Nationality: Puerto Rican
- Born: 9 July 1990 (age 36)
- Height: 1.78 m (5 ft 10 in)
- Weight: 73 kg (161 lb)
- Spike: 270 cm (106 in)
- Block: 265 cm (104 in)

Career
Years	Teams
2012	Lancheras de Cataño

Paulette Garcia (born 9 July 1990) is a Puerto Rican female volleyball player.

With her club Lancheras de Cataño she competed at the 2012 FIVB Volleyball Women's Club World Championship.
