= Yu Junwei =

Chinese footballer (born 2000)

Personal information
- Date of birth: 11 July 2000 (age 26)
- Place of birth: Chengdu, Sichuan, China
- Height: 1.72 m (5 ft 8 in)
- Positions: Winger; full-back

Youth career
- Chengdu FA
- 2016–2017: Vannes
- 2017–2018: Chengdu FA
- 2018–2020: Olympique Lyonnais

International career
Years	Team	Apps	(Gls)
2015	China U16		
2016	China U17		
2015–2018	China U19		

Yu Junwei (Chinese: 鱼竣伟; born 11 July 2000) is a Chinese footballer who plays as a winger.

== Club career ==
Born in Chengdu in the Sichuan province, Yu moved to the Yunnan province as a child, where he played football at elementary school, and gained the nickname "Chengdu Ronaldo", after Portuguese international winger Cristiano Ronaldo, due to their similar styles of play. He started his career at the provincial Chengdu FA side, before moving to France in 2016 and joining professional side Vannes. He returned to China in 2017, and re-joined the Chengdu FA, representing them in the 2017 National Games.

In September 2018, without going on trial first, he returned to France to join Ligue 1 side Olympique Lyonnais, with Chengdu FA teammate Jian Tao also joining, initially on trial, before signing the following year. While at Lyon, he was given the opportunity to kick-off the Ligue 1 match between Lyon and Monaco in December 2018.

== International career ==
In 2015, Yu was called up to both the Chinese under-16 and under-19 teams. The following year, he was called up to the under-17 side for the Huashan Cup, where he featured in a 1–0 loss to South Korea.

He continued to be called up for the under-19 side, returning to his hometown of Chengdu for the 2017 Panda Cup, though China finished bottom of the four team group, having failed to win a game. He received his last call up to the under-19 side in 2018, when he was called up to an Indonesian youth invitational tournament in September.

== Personal life ==
As well as football, Yu takes an interest in acting, and in 2017 listed Pierce Brosnan and Daniel Craig, who both played James Bond, as two of his favourite actors.
