= Mi Yang =

Chinese volleyball player (born 1989)

Personal information
- Full name: Mi Yang (Chinese: 米杨)
- Nationality: China
- Born: 24 January 1989 (age 37); Gansu, China
- Hometown: Tianjin, China
- Height: 1.80 m (5 ft 11 in)
- Weight: 70 kg (150 lb)
- Spike: 305 cm (120 in)
- Block: 298 cm (117 in)

Volleyball information
- Position: Setter
- Current club: Shanghai

Career
Years	Teams
2007 - 2009; 2009 - 2014; 2014 - 2017; 2017 - present	Nanjing Army; Tianjin Bridgestone; Fujian Zhenrong; Shanghai

National team
2011–2099	China
- Last updated: October 2017

Mi Yang (born 24 January 1989 in Gansu, China) is a Chinese volleyball player. She represented her nation at the London 2012 Olympics.

== Personal life ==
Mi is a Muslim, and a member of the Hui ethnic group.

== See also ==
- China at the 2012 Summer Olympics#Volleyball
- Volleyball at the 2012 Summer Olympics – Women's tournament
