= Parinya Pankaew =

Thai volleyball player (born 1995)

Personal information
- Full name: Parinya Pankaew
- Nickname: Prim
- Nationality: Thailand
- Born: 27 December 1995 (age 30); Kanchanaburi, Thailand
- Height: 1.70 m (67 in)
- Weight: 59 kg (130 lb)
- Spike: 281 cm (111 in)
- Block: 269 cm (106 in)

Volleyball information
- Position: Setter
- Current club: Supreme Chonburi
- Number: 16

Career
Years	Teams
2013–	Supreme Chonburi

National team
2014–2015	Thailand

Parinya Pankaew (Thai: ปริญญา พานแก้ว, born 27 December 1995) is a Thai female volleyball player. She was part of the Thailand women's national volleyball team. On club level she played for Supreme Chonburi in 2013.

== Awards ==
=== Clubs ===
- 2013 Thai-Denmark Super League - Runner-Up, with Supreme Nakhonsi VC
- 2016 PSL Invitational Cup - Co-champion, with Est Cola
- 2016–17 Thailand League - Champion, with Supreme Chonburi
- 2017 Thai-Denmark Super League - Champion, with Supreme Chonburi
- 2017–18 Thailand League - Champion, with Supreme Chonburi
- 2018 Thai-Denmark Super League - Champion, with Supreme Chonburi
- 2018–19 Thailand League - Runner-Up, with Supreme Chonburi

== National team ==
- 2014 Asian Games - Bronze medal
