= Zhang Xiaoyu (volleyball) =

Chinese volleyball player (born 1991)

Zhang Xiaoyu (born 28 July 1991) is a Chinese female volleyball player.

She competed at the 2012 FIVB Volleyball Women's Club World Championship, with her club Bohai Bank Tianjin.
