= Loice Jepkoisgei =

Kenyan volleyball player (born 1989)

Personal information
- Nationality: Kenya
- Born: 21 August 1989 (age 37)
- Height: 178 cm (5 ft 10 in)
- Weight: 60 kg (132 lb)
- Spike: 305 cm (120 in)
- Block: 288 cm (113 in)

Volleyball information
- Number: 11

Career
Years	Teams
2011-2012	Kenya Prisons

Loice Jepkoisgei (born 21 August 1989) is a Kenyan female volleyball player.

With her club Kenya Prisons she competed at the 2011 and 2012 FIVB Volleyball Women's Club World Championship.
