= Kenshokai RedHearts =

Japanese volleyball club

Club Name	健祥会レッドハーツ
Arena	Yoshinogawa city & Tokushima city, Tokushima, Japan.
Manager	Koji Morikawa
Head coach	Mitsuru Sasaki
League	V.Challenge League
Position 2010-11	6th place
Team Colors	Red
- Website

Kenshokai RedHearts is a women's volleyball team based in Yoshinogawa and Tokushima in Tokushima Prefecture, Japan. It plays in the V.Challenge League. The club was founded in 2004. The owner of the team is Kenshokai-group Social welfare Corporation (健祥会).

== History ==
- It was founded in 2004.
- It promoted to V.Challenge League in 2005.
- In June 2011, it participated in the 2011 Asian Women's Club Volleyball Championship.

== Honours ==
- V.Challenge League
  - Champion(1) - 2008

== League results ==
League		Position	Teams	Matches	Win	Lose
V1.League	7th (2004–05)	8th	8	14	1	13
V1.League	8th (2005–06)	5th	8	14	5	9
V・challenge	2006-07	5th	8	14	6	8
V・challenge	2007-08	Champion	8	14	12	2
V・challenge	2008-09	6th	10	18	8	10
V・challenge	2009-10	4th	12	16	9	7
V・challenge	2010-11	6th	12	20	10	10

== Current squad ==
As of November 2011

- 1 (Japan) Yumie Taniguchi (Head coach)
- 4 (Japan) Rio Tsuno
- 5 (Japan) Hitomi Nagano
- 6 (Japan) Hiromi Hagiuda
- 7 (Japan) Yukiko Tamaki
- 10 (Japan) Aya Jobetto
- 11 (Japan) Naoko Matsuda
- 12 (Japan) Yuki Nagano
- 15 (Japan) Hitomi Takizawa

== Former players ==
- Machiko Muramoto
- Ai Kitashima
- Hiroko Kido
- Yuuki Sakai
- Aki Sonoda
- Rie Iwamoto
- Hideko Misaki
- Yukiko Tamaki
- Akika Hattori
- Megumi Takahashi
- Tomomi Fukuhara
- Yukiko Uchida

== See also ==
- Kenshokai-Group (ja)
