= Liu Ya =

Chinese volleyball player (born 1990)

Personal information
- Nationality: Chinese
- Born: 29 April 1990 (age 36)
- Height: 180 cm (5 ft 11 in)
- Weight: 66 kg (146 lb)
- Spike: 305 cm (120 in)
- Block: 300 cm (118 in)

Volleyball information
- Number: 15

Career
Years	Teams
2012	Bohai Bank Tianjin

Liu Ya (born 29 April 1990) is a Chinese female volleyball player. She competed with her club Bohai Bank Tianjin at the 2012 FIVB Volleyball Women's Club World Championship.
