= Bureau of Emigration and Overseas Employment =

- ادارہَ بیرون ملک ملازمت و تارکینِ وطن
- State emblem of Pakistan

Agency overview
- Formed: October 1, 1971
- Parent agency: Government of Pakistan
- Website: beoe.gov.pk

Bureau of Emigration and Overseas Employment (BEOE) (Urdu: ادارہَ بیرون ملک ملازمت و تارکینِ وطن) is a Pakistani government bureau that regulates the overseas employment of Pakistani citizens.

== History ==
The BEOE was created on 1 October 1971 by merging three federal government departments: the National Manpower Council, the Protectorate of Emigrants, and the Directorate of Seamen's Welfare.

Originally operating under the Emigration Act of 1922 and Rules (1959), the BEOE now runs under the Emigration Ordinance 1979 XVIII and its Rules.

== Responsibilities ==
The BEOE regulates, facilitates and monitors the emigration process conducted by Recruitment agencies / Overseas Employment Promoters (OEPs), in the private sector. It also regulates direct overseas employment by individual Pakistanis or through their relatives and friends.

The BEOE works to control recruitment frauds and scams and monitors employment promoters in Pakistan. BEOE maintains a thorough record of all OEPs and their activities and maintains a list of OEPs with active licenses.
