= Chen Liyi =

Chinese volleyball player

Personal information
- Full name: Chen Liyi
- Nationality: Chinese
- Born: 27 April 1989 (age 37); Tianjin, China
- Hometown: Tianjin, China
- Height: 1.84 m (6 ft 0 in)
- Weight: 75 kg (165 lb)
- Spike: 302 cm (119 in)
- Block: 290 cm (110 in)

Volleyball information
- Position: Wing spiker
- Current club: Tianjin Bridgestone
- Number: 14

Career
Years	Teams
2009 - present	Tianjin Bridgestone

National team
2010 - 2011, 2016	China
Honours
Women's volleyball
Representing China
World Cup
Bronze medal – third place	2011 Japan	Team
Asian Games
Gold medal – first place	2010 Guangzhou	Team
Asian Championship
Gold medal – first place	2011 Taipei	Team
Asian Cup Championship
Gold medal – first place	2016 Vinh Phuc	Team
Gold medal – first place	2010 Tai Cang	Team
- Last updated: September 2018

Chen Liyi (Chinese: 陈丽怡; pinyin: Chén Lìyí; born 27 April 1989 in Tianjin) is a female Chinese volleyball player.

== Career ==
She won the 2010 Montreux Volley Masters with her national team, being awarded Best Server.

== Clubs ==
- (China) Tianjin Bridgestone

== Individual awards ==
- 2010 Montreux Volley Masters "Best server"
- 2014 Asian Club Championship "Best outside spiker"
