= Wang Ning (volleyball) =

Chinese volleyball player (born 1988)

Personal information
- Nationality: Chinese
- Born: 14 May 1994 (age 32) Tianjin, China
- Home town: Tianjin, China
- Height: 1.89 m (6 ft 2 in)
- Weight: 60 kg (130 lb)
- Spike: 312 cm (123 in)
- Block: 303 cm (119 in)

Volleyball information
- Position: Middle blocker
- Number: 3

Career
- Years: Team
- 2011, 2012: Tianjin Bridgestone, Bohai Bank

National team
- Years: Team
- –: China
Honours
Women's volleyball

Wang Ning (Chinese: 王寧, 王宁 born 14 May 1994 in Tianjin) is a female Chinese volleyball player.

== Career ==
She was part of the team at the 2011 FIVB World Grand Prix, and 2012 FIVB Volleyball Women's Club World Championship.

== Clubs ==
- (China) Tianjin Bridgestone
