= Li Ying (volleyball, born 1988) =

Chinese volleyball player (born 1988)

Personal information
- Full name: 李莹
- Nationality: Chinese
- Born: 29 November 1988 (age 37)
- Height: 1.79 m (5 ft 10 in)

Volleyball information
- Position: Opposite hitter Outside Hitter; Libero
- Current club: Tianjin
- Number: 18

Career
Years	Teams
2009 - 2018	Tianjin
- Last updated: December, 2018

Li Ying (Chinese: 李莹; born 29 November 1988) is a former Chinese female volleyball player, who played as an opposite hitter in Tianjin women's volleyball team.

At the 2014 Asian Women's Club Volleyball Championship with Tianjin Bohai Bank she won the silver medal and was awarded as the best opposite spiker. On club level she played with Tianjin Volleyball in 2015-16.

== Clubs ==
- (China) Tianjin women's volleyball team (2009–2018)
