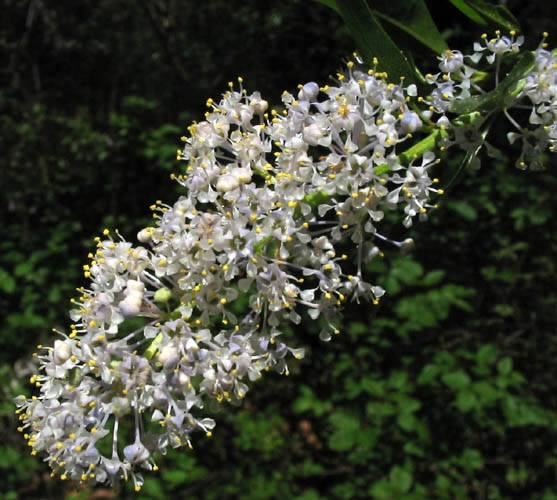

Conservation status
- Least Concern (IUCN 3.1)

- Apparently Secure (NatureServe)

Scientific classification
- Kingdom: Plantae
- Clade: Tracheophytes
- Clade: Angiosperms
- Clade: Eudicots
- Clade: Rosids
- Order: Rosales
- Family: Rhamnaceae
- Genus: Ceanothus
- Species: C. spinosus

Binomial name
- Ceanothus spinosus Nutt.
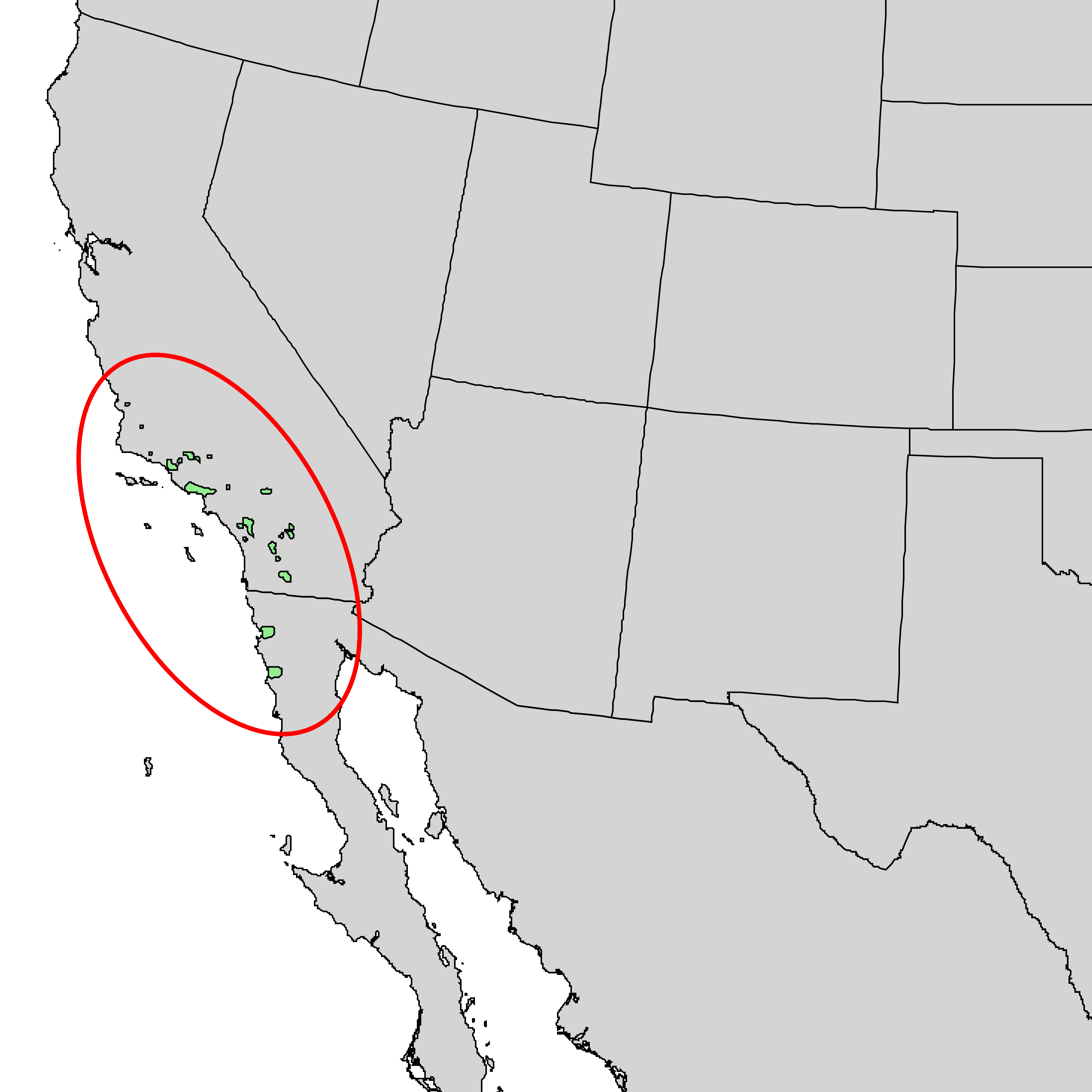
- Natural range of Ceanothus spinosus in California chaparral and woodlands habitats.

= Ceanothus spinosus =

Species of tree

Ceanothus spinosus, with the common names greenbark and redheart, is a species of Ceanothus. It is native to southern California and northern Baja California, where it grows in the scrub and chaparral of the coastal mountain ranges.

== Growth pattern ==
Ceanothus spinosus is a large treelike shrub approaching 6 metres (20 ft) in maximum height.

== Leaves and stems ==
Leaves have a single main vein rising from the leaf base. The thick, firm evergreen leaves are hairless, oval, and up to an inch wide, with smooth margins.

The bark is smooth and olive green, giving rise to its common name. The stem is a rough-barked trunk near the base. Branches are stiff and sharp, or spiny, at the tips. "Ceanothus" means "spiny plant" in Greek, and the species name, "spinosus", means that it is even more spiny.

The stipules (small leaf-like structures at the base of the leaf stem) are thin and fall off early.

== Inflorescence and fruit ==
The shrub blooms in inflorescences up to 15 centimeters long filled with clusters of white to pale blue flowers. The fruit is a smooth, round capsule about half a centimeter wide containing three lobes.

Fruits do not have horns, as do some other members of the genus.

It blooms from February to May.
