= Yin Na =

Chinese volleyball player (born 1988)

Personal information
- Full name: Yin Na
- Nickname: Xiao Doudou (小豆豆)
- Nationality: Chinese
- Born: 3 February 1988 (age 38) Tianjin, China
- Home town: Tianjin, China
- Height: 1.82 m (6 ft 0 in)
- Weight: 65 kg (143 lb)
- Spike: 313 cm (123 in)
- Block: 300 cm (120 in)

Volleyball information
- Position: Wing Spiker
- Current club: Tianjin Bridgestone
- Number: 7

National team
- Years: Team
- 2009-2010 2013-2014: China
Honours
Women's volleyball
Representing China
FIVB World Grand Prix
Silver medal – second place	2013 Sapporo	Team
Asian Championship
Silver medal – second place	2009 Hanoi	Team
Asian Games
Silver medal – second place	2014 Incheon	Team
- Updated on June 2009

Yin Na (Chinese: 殷娜; pinyin: Yīn Nà; born 3 February 1988 in Tianjin) is a female Chinese volleyball player.

== Career ==
She was part of the silver medal winning teams at the 2013 World Grand Prix.

== Clubs ==
- (China) Tianjin Bridgestone (2005 - 2017)

== Individual awards ==
- 2011 Asian Club Championship "Best Spiker"
- 2012 Asian Club Championship "Most Valuable Player"
