= Tianjin Bohai Bank women's volleyball team =

Chinese professional volleyball club

Tianjin Bohai Bank Women's Volleyball Club
- Full name: Tianjin Bohai Bank Women's Volleyball Club 天津渤海銀行排球俱樂部
- Short name: 天津女排
- Nickname: Tianjin Bohai Bank
- Founded: 1993
- Ground: Tianjin People's Stadium (Capacity: 3400)
- Owner: Bohai Bank
- Manager: (China) Chen Fang
- Captain: (China) Li Yingying
- League: Chinese Volleyball League (CVL)
- 2024-25: 4th

Uniforms
Home	Away

Tianjin Bohai Bank Volleyball Club is a Chinese professional women's volleyball club based in Tianjin that plays in the Chinese Volleyball League (CVL). It is sponsored by China Bohai Bank.

Founded in 1993, the team has become a symbolic image of Tianjin Sports and the most successful women's volleyball club in China. Tianjin team have achieved 16 titles in the Chinese Volleyball League, three titles at the National Games of China. Also, Tianjin is the team with the most champions titles at the AVC Champions League, with five titles. The team have been contributing players to the China women's national volleyball team.

== History ==
As the members of "Golden Generation", Li Shan, Zhang Ping and Zhang Na played the key role in China eventually winning the Gold Medal in 2004 Athens Olympics. In 2008 Beijing Olympics, Li Juan, Wei Qiuyue and Zhang Na assisted China women volleyball team to gain the bronze medal. In addition, Tianjin players Yin Na, Wang Qian, Chen Liyi and Mi Yang have been called up to the national team as well.

Tianjin team also participated in some international club competitions and had a good performance, including won silver medal in 2024 FIVB Volleyball Women's Club World Championship and bronze medal in 2023.

== Name evolution ==
- Tianjian Kumho Tires Volleyball Club (1997–1999)
- Tianjin Bridgestone Volleyball Club (2000–2011)
- Tianjin Bohai Bank Volleyball Club (2012–present)

== Team roster ==
Season 2025–2026

2025–2026 Team
Number	Player	Position	Height (m)	Birth date
1	(China) Li Yingying	Outside Hitter	1.92	2000/02/19
2	(China) Zhang Shiqi	Middle Blocker	1.96	1999/05/19
3	(China) Liu Meijun	Outside Hitter	1.82	2002/08/21
6	(China) Zhang Xinyue	Setter	1.84	2002/01/10
7	(China) Yang Yi (C)	Libero	1.85	1997/03/19
10	(Brazil) Natália Pereira	Outside Hitter	1.86	1989/04/04
11	(China) Chen Boya	Outside Hitter	1.87	2000/02/01
12	(China) Meng Dou	Setter	1.90	1997/01/02
13	(China) Meng Zixuan	Libero	1.80	1996/11/18
20	(China) Wang Yizhu	Outside Hitter	1.89	2001/03/23
21	(Dominican Republic) Jineiry Martínez	Middle Blocker	1.92	1997/12/03

== CVL results by Season ==
Season	Final ranking
2025–2026	4th
2024–2025	4th
2023–2024	Champions
2022–2023	Champions
2021–2022	Champions
2020–2021	Champions
2019–2020	Champions
2018–2019	Runners-up
2017–2018	Champions
2016–2017	Third Place
2015–2016	Champions
2014–2015	7th
2013–2014	Runners-up
2012–2013	Champions
2011–2012	Third Place
2010–2011	Champions
2009–2010	Champions
2008–2009	Champions
2007–2008	Champions
2006–2007	Champions
2005–2006	Runners-up
2004–2005	Champions
2003–2004	Champions
2002–2003	Champions
2001–2002	Third Place
2000–2001	8th
1999–2000	9th
1998–1999	6th
1997–1998	5th
1996–1997	-

== Honours ==
=== International competitions ===
==== FIVB Volleyball Women's Club World Championship ====
Runners-up (1): 2024
Third Place (1): 2023

==== AVC Champions League ====
Champions (5): 2005, 2006, 2008, 2012 and 2019
Runners-up (3): 2009, 2011 and 2014
Third Place (1): 2017

=== Domestic competitions ===
==== Chinese Volleyball League / Chinese Volleyball Super League ====
Champions (16): 2002–03, 2003–04, 2004–05, 2006–07, 2007–08, 2008–09, 2009–10, 2010–11, 2012–13, 2015–16, 2017–18, 2019–20, 2020–21, 2021–22, 2022–23 and 2023-24
Runners-up (3): 2005–06, 2013–14 and 2018–19
Third Place (3): 2001–02, 2011–12 and 2016–17

==== Chinese Volleyball Championship ====
Champions (4): 2003, 2006, 2007 and 2017
Runners-up (3): 2012, 2013 and 2015
Third Place (1): 2011

==== Chinese Volleyball Cup ====
Champions (7): 2004, 2006, 2007, 2008, 2009, 2010 and 2014
Runners-up (2): 2012, 2013 and 2015
Third Place (1): 2011

==== National Games of China ====
Champions (4): 2005, 2009, 2013 and 2021

== Former squads ==
Team Member 2014 - 2015

Number	Player name	Position	Height (m)	Birth date
1	(China) Zhang Xiaoyu	Spiker	1.90	1991/07/28
2	(China) Sun Yan	Spiker	1.85	1992/10/09
3	(China) Wang Jiamin	Middle blocker	1.86	1995/02/11
4	(China) Yu Yunwei	Opposite	1.88	1994/07/04
5	(China) Wang Ning	Middle blocker	1.89	1994/05/14
6	(China) Yin Na (c)	Spiker	1.82	1988/02/03
7	(China) Wei Qiuyue	Setter	1.83	1988/09/26
8	(China) Wang Qian	Libero	1.74	1989/03/14
9	(China) Liu Liwen	Libero	1.72	1994/08/02
10	(China) Mi Yang	Setter	1.80	1989/01/24
12	(China) Zhang Xiaoting	Middle blocker	1.85	1989/01/21
11	(China) Chen Xintong	Setter	1.80	1994/04/08
12	(China) Chen Liyi	Spiker	1.84	1989/04/27
13	(China) Liu Ya	Opposite	1.80	1990/04/29
14	(China) Yao Di	Setter	1.82	1992/08/15
15	(China) Wang Yuanyuan	Middle blocker	1.95	1997/07/14
16	(China) Li Ying	Spiker/opposite	1.79	1988/11/29

As of Jan 2012

Number	Player name	Position	Height (m)	Birth date
1	(China) Zhang Xiaoyu	Spiker	1.90	1991/07/28
2	(China) Wang Ning	Middle blocker	1.89	1994/05/14
4	(China) Wang Jiamin	Middle blocker	1.86	1995/02/11
6	(China) Li Shan	Opposite	1.85	1980/05/21
7	(China) Yin Na	Opposite/spiker	1.82	1988/02/03
9	(China) Wang Qian	Libero	1.72	1989/03/14
8	(China) Wei Qiuyue (c)	Setter	1.82	1988/09/26
10	(China) Li Juan	Spiker	1.87	1981/05/15
11	(China) Mi Yang	Setter	1.80	1989/01/24
12	(China) Zhang Xiaoting	Middle blocker	1.85	1989/01/21
14	(China) Chen Liyi	Spiker	1.84	1989/04/27
15	(China) Liu Ya	Opposite/libero	1.80	1990/04/29
16	(China) Yao Di	Setter	1.82	1992/08/15
17	(China) Huo Jing	Middle blocker	1.87	1988/01/08
18	(China) Li Ying	Spiker/opposite	1.79	1988/11/29

== Former players ==
- (China) Ding Hongying (1989–2008)
- (China) Zhang Na (1997–2009)
- (China) Zhang Ping (1998–2007)
- (China) Li Juan (1998–2013)
- (China) Yang Yanan (2002–2010)
- (China) Wei Qiuyue (2003–2013, 2014–2017)
- (China) Xue Ming (2012–2013)
- (Serbia) Brižitka Molnar (2014–2015)
- (Serbia) Ivana Nešović (2014–2015)
- (Bulgaria) Eva Yaneva (2015–2016)
- (Cuba) Nancy Carrillo (2015–2017)
- (Serbia) Brankica Mihajlović (2016–2017)
- (Serbia) Aleksandra Crnčević (2018–2019)
- (United States) Destinee Hooker (2019–2020)
- (China) Zhu Ting (2019–2021)
- (Turkey) (Cuba) Melissa Vargas (2021–2024)
- (China) Yuan Xinyue (2020–2024)
- (Russia) Irina Fetisova (2024–2025)
