= Zhang Xiaoting =

Chinese volleyball player (born 1989)

Zhang Xiaoting (born 21 January 1989) is a Chinese female volleyball player.

She competed at the 2012 FIVB Volleyball Women's Club World Championship, with her club Bohai Bank Tianjin.
