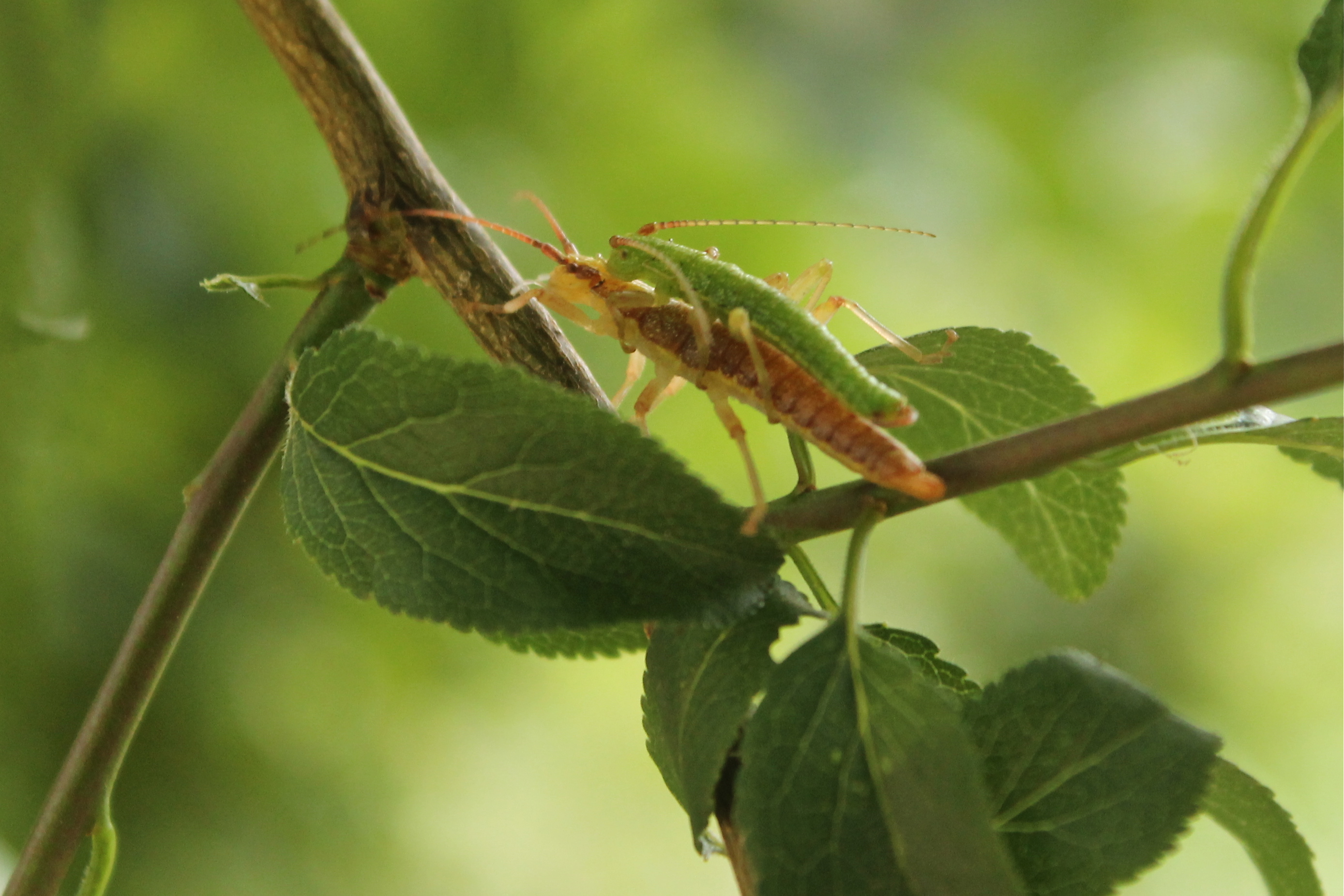
- Timema californicum mating pair

Scientific classification
- Kingdom: Animalia
- Phylum: Arthropoda
- Clade: Pancrustacea
- Class: Insecta
- Order: Phasmatodea
- Suborder: Timematodea; Kevan, 1982
- Family: Timematidae; Caudell, 1903

Genera
- ?†Electrotimema Zompro 2005; †Granosicorpes Chen et al. 2019; Timema Scudder, 1895; †Tumefactipes Chen et al. 2019

= Timematodea =

Timematodea Temporal range: Cenomanian–Recent

Suborder of stick insects

Timematodea is a small suborder of stick insects, believed to be the earliest diverging living branch of the group. It contains only one living genus, Timema, known from the western United States, as well as two fossil genera, Granosicorpes and Tumefactipes from the early Late Cretaceous (Cenomanian) aged Burmese amber of Myanmar, all three of which are assigned to the family Timematidae. Another genus, Electrotimema, from Eocene aged Baltic amber, has also been assigned to the suborder, but its precise placement is uncertain, as the diagnostic features of the tarsi were cited inconsistently, so it is unclear whether they are 5-segmented or 3-segmented. A key diagnostic character of the family Timematidae is 3-segmented tarsi, and 5-segmented tarsi would suggest Electrotimema is not a timematid.
