= 2019 VTV9 – Binh Dien International Women's Volleyball Cup =

2019 VTV9 - Binh Dien International Women's Volleyball Cup
Tournament details
- Host country: Vietnam
- Dates: May 11–19
- Teams: 8
- Venue: 1 (in 1 host city)

The 2019 VTV9 – Binh Dien International Women's Volleyball Cup is the 13th iteration of the VTV9 - Binh Dien International Women's Volleyball Cup. The tournament was held in Kiên Giang, Vietnam.

== Pools ==
Pool A	Pool B
(Vietnam) VTV Bình Điền Long An (Host) (Vietnam) Vietinbank (China) Nanjing; Thailand U23	(Vietnam) Thông tin LVPB (Vietnam) Đức Giang Hà Nội (China) Sichuan (United States) Bring It Promotions

== Pool standing procedure ==
1. Number of matches won
2. Match points
3. Sets ratio
4. Points ratio
5. Result of the last match between the tied teams

Match won 3–0 or 3–1: 3 match points for the winner, 0 match points for the loser
Match won 3–2: 2 match points for the winner, 1 match point for the loser

== Preliminary round ==
- All times are Vietnam Standard Time (UTC+07:00).

=== Pool A ===
Pos	Team	Pld	W	L	Pts	SW	SL	SR	SPW	SPL	SPR	Qualification
1	(Vietnam) VTV Bình Điền Long An	3	3	0	8	9	3	3.000	285	233	1.223	Semifinals
2	Thailand U23	3	2	1	6	8	5	1.600	283	263	1.076	Semifinals
3	(Vietnam) Vietinbank	3	1	2	4	6	6	1.000	271	268	1.011	Classification 5th-8th
4	(China) Nanjing	3	0	3	0	0	9	0.000	150	225	0.667	Classification 5th-8th

Date	Time		Score		Set 1	Set 2	Set 3	Set 4	Set 5	Total	Report
11 May	16:00	Thailand U23	3–2	(Vietnam) Vietinbank	25–22	23–25	22–25	25–22	15–9	110–103	
11 May	19:30	VTV Bình Điền Long An (Vietnam)	3–0	(China) Nanjing	25–17	25–18	25–7			75–42	
13 May	16:00	Nanjing (China)	0–3	(Vietnam) Vietinbank	22–25	18–25	17–25			57–75	
13 May	19:00	VTV Bình Điền Long An (Vietnam)	3–2	Thailand U23	25–15	23–25	20–25	25–19	16–14	109–98	
15 May	16:00	Nanjing (China)	0–3	Thailand U23	10–25	18–25	23–25			51–75	
15 May	19:00	VTV Bình Điền Long An (Vietnam)	3–1	(Vietnam) Vietinbank	21–25	27–25	28–26	25–17		101–93	

=== Pool B ===
Pos	Team	Pld	W	L	Pts	SW	SL	SR	SPW	SPL	SPR	Qualification
1	(China) Sichuan	3	3	0	9	9	0	MAX	225	166	1.355	Semifinals
2	(United States) Bring It Promotions	3	2	1	6	6	4	1.500	226	205	1.102	Semifinals
3	(Vietnam) Thông tin LVPB	3	1	2	3	4	7	0.571	217	242	0.897	Classification 5th-8th
4	(Vietnam) Đức Giang Hà Nội	3	0	3	0	1	9	0.111	189	244	0.775	Classification 5th-8th

Date	Time		Score		Set 1	Set 2	Set 3	Set 4	Set 5	Total	Report
12 May	16:00	Sichuan (China)	3–0	(Vietnam) Thông tin LVPB	25–12	25–19	25–19			75–50	
12 May	19:00	Bring It Promotions (United States)	3–0	(Vietnam) Đức Giang Hà Nội	25–20	25–19	25–18			75–57	
14 May	16:00	Thông tin LVPB (Vietnam)	3–1	(Vietnam) Đức Giang Hà Nội	26–24	18–25	25–13	25–21		94–83	
14 May	19:00	Bring It Promotions (United States)	0–3	(China) Sichuan	22–25	22–25	23–25			67–75	
16 May	16:00	Sichuan (China)	3–0	(Vietnam) Đức Giang Hà Nội	25–16	25–20	25–13			75–49	
16 May	19:00	Bring It Promotions (United States)	3–1	(Vietnam) Thông tin LVPB	9–25	25–17	25–18	25–13		84–73	

== Classification 5th-8th ==
- All times are Vietnam Standard Time (UTC+07:00).

Classification 5th-8th
18 May
(Vietnam) Vietinbank	0
(Vietnam) Đức Giang Hà Nội	3
18 May
(Vietnam) Thông tin LVPB	3
(China) Nanjing	0

5th place match
19 May
(Vietnam) Đức Giang Hà Nội	1
(Vietnam) Thông tin LVPB	3
7th place match
19 May
(Vietnam) Vietinbank	3
(China) Nanjing	0

=== Classification 5th-8th ===
Date	Time		Score		Set 1	Set 2	Set 3	Set 4	Set 5	Total	Report
18 May	12:10	Vietinbank (Vietnam)	0–3	(Vietnam) Đức Giang Hà Nội	18–25	16–25	17–25			51–75	
18 May	14:00	Thông tin LVPB (Vietnam)	3–0	(China) Nanjing	25–20	25–20	25–15			75–55	

=== 7th place ===
Date	Time		Score		Set 1	Set 2	Set 3	Set 4	Set 5	Total	Report
19 May	12:10	Vietinbank (Vietnam)	3–0	(China) Nanjing	25–7	25–18	25–20			75–45	

=== 5th place ===
Date	Time		Score		Set 1	Set 2	Set 3	Set 4	Set 5	Total	Report
19 May	14:00	Đức Giang Hà Nội (Vietnam)	1–3	(Vietnam) Thông tin LVPB	25–17	14–25	16–25	22–25		77–92	

== Final round ==
- All times are Vietnam Standard Time (UTC+07:00).

Semifinals
18 May
(Vietnam) VTV Bình Điền Long An	1
(United States) Bring It Promotions	3
18 May
(China) Sichuan	3
Thailand U23	2

Final
19 May
(United States) Bring It Promotions	0
(China) Sichuan	3
3rd place match
19 May
(Vietnam) VTV Bình Điền Long An	2
Thailand U23	3

=== Semifinals ===
Date	Time		Score		Set 1	Set 2	Set 3	Set 4	Set 5	Total	Report
18 May	16:00	VTV Bình Điền Long An (Vietnam)	1–3	(United States) Bring It Promotions	22–25	25–23	13–25	20–25		80–98	
18 May	19:00	Sichuan (China)	3–2	Thailand U23	30–28	17–25	24–26	25–13	15–9	111–101	

=== 3rd place ===
Date	Time		Score		Set 1	Set 2	Set 3	Set 4	Set 5	Total	Report
19 May	16:00	VTV Bình Điền Long An (Vietnam)	2–3	Thailand U23	25–16	26–24	23–25	19–25	10–15	103–105	

=== Final ===
Date	Time		Score		Set 1	Set 2	Set 3	Set 4	Set 5	Total	Report
19 May	19:30	Bring It Promotions (United States)	0–3	(China) Sichuan	23–25	24–26	18–25			65–76	

== Final standing ==
Rank	Team
1st place, gold medalist(s)	(China) Sichuan
2nd place, silver medalist(s)	(United States) Bring It Promotions
3rd place, bronze medalist(s)	Thailand U23
4	(Vietnam) VTV Bình Điền Long An
5	(Vietnam) Thông tin LVPB
6	(Vietnam) Đức Giang Hà Nội
7	(Vietnam) Vietinbank
8	(China) Nanjing

2019 VTV9 - Binh Dien Women's Volleyball Cup Champions

Team roster

Huang He, Su Weiping, Zhang Jialing, Zhang Honglin, Wang Chen, Tang Weidan, Zhang Xiaoya, Chen Biaobiao, Yang Menglu, Liu Meiling,

Head Coach:

== Awards ==
- Most valuable player
  (United States) Lindsay Stalzer (Bring It Promotions)
- Best setter
  (China) Wang Chen (Sichuan)
- Best outside hitters
  (Vietnam) Trần Thị Thanh Thúy (VTV Bình Điền Long An)
  (China) Zhang Honglin (Sichuan)
- Best middle blockers
  (United States) Samantha Cash (Bring It Promotions)
  (China) Zhang Xiaoya (Sichuan)
- Best opposite spiker
  Thanacha Sooksod (Thailand U23)
- Best libero
  (Vietnam) Nguyễn Thị Kim Liên (VTV Bình Điền Long An)
- Best Young Player
  (Vietnam) Hoàng Thị Kiều Trinh (Thông tin LVPB)
- Miss Volleyball
  (Vietnam) Đặng Thị Kim Thanh (VTV Bình Điền Long An)

== See also ==
- VTV9 - Binh Dien International Women's Volleyball Cup
