= 2016 VTV9 – Binh Dien International Women's Volleyball Cup =

2016 VTV9 - Binh Dien International Women's Volleyball Cup
Tournament details
- Host country: Vietnam
- Dates: March 19–27
- Teams: 8
- Venue: 1 (in 1 host city)

Final positions
- Champions: (Vietnam) Vietinbank (2nd title)

Tournament awards
- MVP: (China) Yang Wenjin

The 2016 VTV9 - Binh Dien International Women's Volleyball Cup was the 10th staging. The tournament was held in Ninh Bình, Vietnam.

== Pools composition ==
Live on VTV9, VTV6, THE THAO TV and SKTV16

Pool A	Pool B
(Vietnam) VTV Bình Điền Long An (Host); Thailand U20 (China) Jiangsu; Malaysia	(Vietnam) Vietinbank (China) Fujian (North Korea) April 25 Sports Club (Vietnam) Thông tin LVPB

== Pool standing procedure ==
1. Number of matches won
2. Match points
3. Sets ratio
4. Points ratio
5. Result of the last match between the tied teams

Match won 3–0 or 3–1: 3 match points for the winner, 0 match points for the loser
Match won 3–2: 2 match points for the winner, 1 match point for the loser

== Preliminary round ==
- All times are Vietnam Standard Time (UTC+07:00).

=== Pool A ===
Pos	Team	Pld	W	L	Pts	SW	SL	SR	SPW	SPL	SPR	Qualification
1	(China) Jiangsu	3	3	0	9	9	3	3.000	266	242	1.099	Semifinals
2	(Vietnam) VTV Bình Điền Long An	3	2	1	6	7	4	1.750	262	222	1.180	Semifinals
3	Thailand U20	3	1	2	3	5	6	0.833	241	241	1.000	Classification 5th-8th
4	Malaysia	3	0	3	0	1	9	0.111	173	237	0.730	Classification 5th-8th

Date	Time		Score		Set 1	Set 2	Set 3	Set 4	Set 5	Total	Report
19 Mar	17:00	Thailand U20	3–0	Malaysia	25–18	25–12	25–17			75–47	
19 Mar	20:30	VTV Bình Điền Long An (Vietnam)	1–3	(China) Jiangsu	25–10	20–25	20–25	22–25		87–85	
21 Mar	15:30	Jiangsu (China)	3–1	Thailand U20	19–25	25–17	25–21	25–19		94–82	
21 Mar	17:00	VTV Bình Điền Long An (Vietnam)	3–0	Malaysia	25–15	25–21	25–17			75–53	
23 Mar	15:30	Malaysia	1–3	(China) Jiangsu	15–25	20–25	25–12	13–25		73–87	
23 Mar	17:00	VTV Bình Điền Long An (Vietnam)	3–1	Thailand U20	25–18	25–16	23–25	27–25		100–84	

=== Pool B ===
Pos	Team	Pld	W	L	Pts	SW	SL	SR	SPW	SPL	SPR	Qualification
1	(Vietnam) Vietinbank	3	2	1	7	8	4	2.000	279	236	1.182	Semifinals
2	(Vietnam) Thông tin LVPB	3	2	1	4	7	7	1.000	293	313	0.936	Semifinals
3	(North Korea) April 25 Sports Club	3	1	2	4	6	6	1.000	270	251	1.076	Classification 5th-8th
4	(China) Fujian	3	1	2	3	3	7	0.429	189	249	0.759	Classification 5th-8th

Date	Time		Score		Set 1	Set 2	Set 3	Set 4	Set 5	Total	Report
20 Mar	15:30	Vietinbank (Vietnam)	3–1	(North Korea) April 25 Sports Club	25–23	25–22	21–25	25–19		96–89	
20 Mar	17:00	Thông tin LVPB (Vietnam)	1–3	(China) Fujian	23–25	26–24	19–25	22–25		90–99	
22 Mar	15:30	April 25 Sports Club (North Korea)	2–3	(Vietnam) Thông tin LVPB	25–20	24–26	22–25	25–16	10–15	106–102	
22 Mar	17:00	Vietinbank (Vietnam)	3–0	(China) Fujian	25–10	25–23	25–13			75–46	
24 Mar	15:30	April 25 Sports Club (North Korea)	3–0	(China) Fujian	25–22	25–8	25–23			75–53	
24 Mar	17:00	Vietinbank (Vietnam)	2–3	(Vietnam) Thông tin LVPB	25–16	25–18	24–26	20–25	14–16	108–101	

== Classification 5th-8th ==
- All times are Vietnam Standard Time (UTC+07:00).

Classification 5th-8th
26 Mar
(China) Fujian	3
Thailand U20	0
26 Mar
(North Korea) April 25 Sports Club	3
Malaysia	0

5th place match
27 Mar
(China) Fujian	3
(North Korea) April 25 Sports Club	1
7th place match
27 Mar
Thailand U20	3
Malaysia	0

=== Classification 5th-8th ===
Date	Time		Score		Set 1	Set 2	Set 3	Set 4	Set 5	Total	Report
26 Mar	11:00	Fujian (China)	3–0	Thailand U20	25–19	25–13	25–23			75–55	
26 Mar	13:00	April 25 Sports Club (North Korea)	3–0	Malaysia	25–13	25–16	25–11			75–40	

=== 7th place ===
Date	Time		Score		Set 1	Set 2	Set 3	Set 4	Set 5	Total	Report
27 Mar	16:00	Thailand U20	3–0	Malaysia	25–17	25–18	25–19			75–54	

=== 5th place ===
Date	Time		Score		Set 1	Set 2	Set 3	Set 4	Set 5	Total	Report
27 Mar	10:00	Fujian (China)	3–1	(North Korea) April 25 Sports Club	17–25	26–24	25–19	25–17		93–85	

== Final round ==
- All times are Vietnam Standard Time (UTC+07:00).

Semifinals
26 Mar
(China) Jiangsu	3
(Vietnam) Thông tin LVPB	2
26 Mar
(Vietnam) VTV Bình Điền Long An	0
(Vietnam) Vietinbank	3

Final
27 Mar
(Vietnam) Vietinbank	3
(China) Jiangsu	1
3rd place match
27 Mar
(Vietnam) VTV Bình Điền Long An	3
(Vietnam) Thông tin LVPB	1

=== Semifinals ===
Date	Time		Score		Set 1	Set 2	Set 3	Set 4	Set 5	Total	Report
26 Mar	15:00	Jiangsu (China)	3–2	(Vietnam) Thông tin LVPB	25–16	20–25	25–22	18–25	15–13	103–101	
26 Mar	17:00	Vietinbank (Vietnam)	3–0	(Vietnam) VTV Bình Điền Long An	25–21	25–20	25–23			75–64	

=== 3rd place match ===
Date	Time		Score		Set 1	Set 2	Set 3	Set 4	Set 5	Total	Report
27 Mar	17:00	VTV Bình Điền Long An (Vietnam)	3–1	(Vietnam) Thông tin LVPB	25–21	14–25	25–18	25–23		89–87	

=== Final ===
Date	Time		Score		Set 1	Set 2	Set 3	Set 4	Set 5	Total	Report
27 Mar	20:00	Vietinbank (Vietnam)	3–1	(China) Jiangsu	25–23	26–24	21–25	38–36		110–108	

== Final standing ==
Rank	Team
1st place, gold medalist(s)	(Vietnam) Vietinbank
2nd place, silver medalist(s)	(China) Jiangsu
3rd place, bronze medalist(s)	(Vietnam) VTV Bình Điền Long An
4	(Vietnam) Thông tin LVPB
5	(China) Fujian
6	(North Korea) April 25 Sports Club
7	Thailand U20
8	Malaysia

2016 VTV9 - Binh Dien Women's Volleyball Cup

2nd title

== Awards ==
- Most valuable player
  (China) Yang Wenjing (Jiangsu)
- Best setter
  (China) Rong Wanqianbai (Jiangsu)
- Best outside hitters
  (Vietnam) Tran Thi Thanh Thuy (VTV Bình Điền Long An)
  (Vietnam) Dinh Thi Thuy (Vietinbank)
- Best middle blockers
  (China) Wu Han (Jiangsu)
  (Vietnam) Nguyen Thi Ngoc Hoa (VTV Bình Điền Long An)
- Best opposite spiker
  (Vietnam) Au Hong Nhung (Thông tin LVPB )
- Best libero
  (Vietnam) Bui Vu Thanh Tuyen (Vietinbank)
- Miss cup
  (China) Wang Yuqi (Jiangsu)
