= 2018 VTV9 – Binh Dien International Women's Volleyball Cup =

2018 VTV9 - Binh Dien International Women's Volleyball Cup
Tournament details
- Host country: Vietnam
- Dates: May 12–20
- Teams: 8
- Venue: 1 (in 1 host city)

Final positions
- Champions: (China) Jiangsu (2nd title)

Tournament awards
- MVP: (United States) Holly Touliver

The 2018 VTV9 - Binh Dien International Women's Volleyball Cup was the 12th staging. The tournament was held in Tam Kỳ, Quảng Nam Province, Vietnam.

== Pools composition ==
Pool A	Pool B
(Vietnam) VTV Bình Điền Long An (Host) (Vietnam) Thông tin LVPB (China) Fujian (Thailand) Est Cola	(Vietnam) Vietinbank (Kazakhstan) Almaty VC (China) Jiangsu (United States) Bring It Promotions

== Pool standing procedure ==
1. Number of matches won
2. Match points
3. Sets ratio
4. Points ratio
5. Result of the last match between the tied teams

Match won 3–0 or 3–1: 3 match points for the winner, 0 match points for the loser
Match won 3–2: 2 match points for the winner, 1 match point for the loser

== Preliminary round ==
- All times are Vietnam Standard Time (UTC+07:00).

=== Pool A ===
Pos	Team	Pld	W	L	Pts	SW	SL	SR	SPW	SPL	SPR	Qualification
1	(Vietnam) VTV Bình Điền Long An	3	3	0	9	9	2	4.500	270	228	1.184	Semifinals
2	(China) Fujian	3	2	1	5	6	6	1.000	272	270	1.007	Semifinals
3	(Thailand) Est Cola	3	1	2	3	5	7	0.714	266	281	0.947	Classification 5th-8th
4	(Vietnam) Thông tin LVPB	3	0	3	1	4	9	0.444	278	307	0.906	Classification 5th-8th

Date	Time		Score		Set 1	Set 2	Set 3	Set 4	Set 5	Total	Report
12 May	16:10	Fujian (China)	3–2	(Vietnam) Thông tin LVPB	27–29	26–24	23–25	25–21	15–10	116–109	P2
12 May	19:30	VTV Bình Điền Long An (Vietnam)	3–1	(Thailand) Est Cola	27–25	25–18	20–25	25–19		97–87	P2
14 May	16:10	Thông tin LVPB (Vietnam)	1–3	(Thailand) Est Cola	19–25	25–18	18–25	21–25		83–93	P2
14 May	19:00	VTV Bình Điền Long An (Vietnam)	3–0	(China) Fujian	25–20	25–17	25–18			75–55	P2
16 May	16:10	Est Cola (Thailand)	1–3	(China) Fujian	26–24	25–27	18–25	17–25		86–101	P2
16 May	19:00	VTV Bình Điền Long An (Vietnam)	3–1	(Vietnam) Thông tin LVPB	25–23	25–19	23–25	25–19		98–86	P2

=== Pool B ===
Pos	Team	Pld	W	L	Pts	SW	SL	SR	SPW	SPL	SPR	Qualification
1	(China) Jiangsu	3	3	0	7	9	4	2.250	296	235	1.260	Semifinals
2	(United States) Bring It Promotions	3	2	1	7	8	4	2.000	263	243	1.082	Semifinals
3	(Vietnam) Vietinbank	3	1	2	3	4	6	0.667	217	212	1.024	Classification 5th-8th
4	(Kazakhstan) Almaty VC	3	0	3	1	2	9	0.222	173	259	0.668	Classification 5th-8th

Date	Time		Score		Set 1	Set 2	Set 3	Set 4	Set 5	Total	Report
13 May	16:10	Bring It Promotions (United States)	3–1	(Vietnam) Vietinbank	21–25	25–21	25–20	25–21		96–87	P2
13 May	19:00	Jiangsu (China)	3–2	(Kazakhstan) Almaty VC	25–17	18–25	25–9	26–28	15–9	109–88	P2
15 May	16:10	Bring It Promotions (United States)	3–0	(Kazakhstan) Almaty VC	25–15	25–20	25–10			75–45	P2
15 May	19:00	Vietinbank (Vietnam)	0–3	(China) Jiangsu	24–26	16–25	15–25			55–76	P2
17 May	16:10	Almaty VC (Kazakhstan)	0–3	(Vietnam) Vietinbank	13–25	10–25	17–25			40–75	P2
17 May	19:00	Bring It Promotions (United States)	2–3	(China) Jiangsu	19–25	25–23	19–25	25–23	4–15	92–111	P2

== Classification 5th-8th ==
- All times are Vietnam Standard Time (UTC+07:00).

Classification 5th-8th
19 May
(Thailand) Est Cola	3
(Kazakhstan) Almaty VC	1
19 May
(Vietnam) Vietinbank	3
(Vietnam) Thông tin LVPB	2

5th place match
20 May
(Thailand) Est Cola	3
(Vietnam) Vietinbank	1
7th place match
20 May
(Kazakhstan) Almaty VC	1
(Vietnam) Thông tin LVPB	3

=== Classification 5th-8th ===
Date	Time		Score		Set 1	Set 2	Set 3	Set 4	Set 5	Total	Report
19 May	12:10	Est Cola (Thailand)	3–1	(Kazakhstan) Almaty VC	17–25	25–23	26–24	25–15		93–87	P2
19 May	14:00	Vietinbank (Vietnam)	3–2	(Vietnam) Thông tin LVPB	29–27	23–25	20–25	25–23	15–12	112–112	P2

=== 7th place ===
Date	Time		Score		Set 1	Set 2	Set 3	Set 4	Set 5	Total	Report
20 May	12:10	Almaty VC (Kazakhstan)	1–3	(Vietnam) Thông tin LVPB	22–25	19–25	25–16	18–25		84–91	

=== 5th place ===
Date	Time		Score		Set 1	Set 2	Set 3	Set 4	Set 5	Total	Report
20 May	14:00	Est Cola (Thailand)	3–1	(Vietnam) Vietinbank	25–17	16–25	25–22	25–19		91–83	

== Final round ==
- All times are Vietnam Standard Time (UTC+07:00).

Semifinals
19 May
(Vietnam) VTV Bình Điền Long An	2
(United States) Bring It Promotions	3
19 May
(China) Jiangsu	3
(China) Fujian	1

Final
20 May
(United States) Bring It Promotions	2
(China) Jiangsu	3
3rd place match
20 May
(Vietnam) VTV Bình Điền Long An	3
(China) Fujian	0

=== Semifinals ===
Date	Time		Score		Set 1	Set 2	Set 3	Set 4	Set 5	Total	Report
19 May	17:10	Jiangsu (China)	3–1	(China) Fujian	20–25	25–17	25–23	25–16		95–81	P2
19 May	19:00	VTV Bình Điền Long An (Vietnam)	2–3	(United States) Bring It Promotions	25–18	17–25	23–25	25–18	8–15	98–101	P2

=== 3rd place ===
Date	Time		Score		Set 1	Set 2	Set 3	Set 4	Set 5	Total	Report
20 May	16:10	Fujian (China)	0–3	(Vietnam) VTV Bình Điền Long An	25–27	15–25	22–25			62–77	

=== Final ===
Date	Time		Score		Set 1	Set 2	Set 3	Set 4	Set 5	Total	Report
20 May	20:00	Jiangsu (China)	3–2	(United States) Bring It Promotions	21–25	21–25	25–22	25–17	15–6	107–95	

== Final standing ==
Rank	Team
1st place, gold medalist(s)	(China) Jiangsu
2nd place, silver medalist(s)	(United States) Bring It Promotions
3rd place, bronze medalist(s)	(Vietnam) VTV Bình Điền Long An
4	(China) Fujian
5	(Thailand) Est Cola
6	(Vietnam) Vietinbank
7	(Vietnam) Thông tin LVPB
8	(Kazakhstan) Almaty VC

2018 VTV9 - Binh Dien Women's Volleyball Cup

2nd title

Team roster

Wu Han, Rong Wanqianbai, Wang Yuqi, Diao Linyu, Zhou Xinyi, Xu Ruoya, Wang Chenyue, Bai Jie, Chen Yixuan, Wei Yuxin, Yang Wenjin, Zang Qianqian

Head Coach: Cai Bin

== Awards ==
- Most valuable player
  (United States) Holly Toliver (Bring It Promotions)
- Best setter
  (China) Diao Linyu (Jiangsu)
- Best outside hitters
  (Vietnam) Trần Thị Thanh Thúy (VTV Bình Điền Long An)
  (United States) Allison Mayfield (Bring It Promotions)
- Best middle blockers
  (China) Wang Chenyue (Jiangsu)
  (China) Zheng Yixin (Fujian)
- Best opposite spiker
  (China) Wu Han (Jiangsu)
- Best libero
  (Vietnam) Nguyễn Thị Kim Liên (VTV Bình Điền Long An)
- Best Young Player
  (Vietnam) Dương Thị Hên (VTV Bình Điền Long An)
- Miss Volleyball
  (Kazakhstan) Sabina Altynbekova (Almaty VC)

== See also ==
- VTV9 - Binh Dien International Women's Volleyball Cup
