= VTV9 – Binh Dien International Women's Volleyball Cup =

- Founded: 2006
- Country: Vietnam
- Number of clubs: 8
- Level on pyramid: 1
- Current champions: (China) Jiangsu Zenith Steel (3rd title)
- Most championships: Vietnam (8 titles)

VTV9 – Binh Dien International Women's Volleyball Cup is an international women's volleyball tournament organised by the Vietnam Volleyball Federation, and sponsored by VTV9 and Binh Dien Fertilizer Company. The cup was established in 2006.

== Results ==
Year	Host	Final			Third place match		
Year	Host	Champions	Score	Runners-up	3rd place	Score	4th place
2006 details	Long An	(Vietnam); Vietinbank	3–1	(Vietnam); VTV Bình Điền Long An	(Vietnam); Bộ Tư lệnh Thông tin	3–0	(Vietnam); Vital Thái Bình
2007 details	Long An	(Vietnam); VTV Bình Điền Long An	3–0	(Vietnam); Vietinbank	(Thailand); Nakhon Ratchasima	3–0	Myanmar
2008 details	Đắk Lắk	(Vietnam); Vital Petechim Thái Bình	3–2	(Vietnam); VTV Bình Điền Long An	(Vietnam); Vietinbank	3–2	(Vietnam); Bộ Tư lệnh Thông tin Trust Bank
2010 details	Gia Lai	(Vietnam); VTV Bình Điền Long An	3–2	(Vietnam); Thông tin Liên Việt Bank	Chinese Taipei	3–0	(Vietnam); PV Oil Thái Bình
2011 details	Đồng Nai	(Vietnam); Thông tin LVPB	3–0	(Vietnam); Vietsovpetro	(China); Jiangsu ECE Volleyball	3–2	(Thailand); Lopburi VC
2012 details	Hậu Giang	(China); Jiangsu ECE Volleyball	3–0	(Vietnam); VTV Bình Điền Long An	(Vietnam); Thông tin LVPB	3–1	(Vietnam); Vietinbank
2013 details	Gia Lai	(Vietnam); Thông tin LVPB	3–2	(Kazakhstan); Karaganda VC	(Vietnam); Vietinbank	3–0	(Vietnam); Vietsovpetro
2014 details	Đắk Nông	(Vietnam); Thông tin LVPB	3–2	(Vietnam); VTV Bình Điền Long An	(Vietnam); Vietinbank	3–0	(China); Weifang VC
2015 details	Quảng Trị	(North Korea); 4.25 SC	3–1	(Vietnam); Thông tin LVPB	(Kazakhstan); Astana VC	3–1	(Vietnam); VTV Bình Điền Long An
2016 details	Ninh Bình	(Vietnam); Vietinbank	3–1	(China); Jiangsu Zenith Steel	(Vietnam); VTV Bình Điền Long An	3–1	(Vietnam); Thông tin LVPB
2017 details	Tây Ninh	(Thailand); Bangkok Glass	3–1	(Vietnam); VTV Bình Điền Long An	(China); Yunnan	3–2	(North Korea); 4.25 SC
2018 details	Quảng Nam	(China); Jiangsu Zenith Steel	3–2	(United States); Bring It Promotions	(Vietnam); VTV Bình Điền Long An	3–0	(China); Fujian
2019 details	Kiên Giang	(China); Sichuan	3–0	(United States); Bring It Promotions	Thailand U23	3–2	(Vietnam); VTV Bình Điền Long An
2024 details	Đắk Lắk	(Japan); PFU BlueCats	3–1	(Vietnam); LP Bank Ninh Bình	(Vietnam); Binh chủng Thông tin - TTBP	3–0	(Vietnam); VTV Bình Điền Long An
2026 details	Tây Ninh	(China); Jiangsu Zenith Steel	3–0	(Vietnam); VTV Bình Điền Long An	(Vietnam); Hà Nội Tasco Auto	3–1	(Vietnam); LP Bank Ninh Bình
2027 details	Đồng Nai						

== Medal table ==
Rank	Nation	Gold	Silver	Bronze	Total
1	Vietnam	8	11	9	28
2	China	4	1	2	7
3	Thailand	1	0	2	3
4	Japan	1	0	0	1
4	North Korea	1	0	0	1
6	United States	0	2	0	2
7	Kazakhstan	0	1	1	2
8	Chinese Taipei	0	0	1	1
Totals (8 entries)		15	15	15	45

== Most valuable player by edition ==
- 2006 – (Vietnam) Phạm Thị Kim Huệ
- 2007 – (Thailand) Yaowalak Mahaon
- 2008 – (Thailand) Pleumjit Thinkaow
- 2010 – (Vietnam) Nguyễn Thị Ngọc Hoa
- 2011 – (Vietnam) Phạm Thị Kim Huệ
- 2012 – (Vietnam) Nguyễn Thị Ngọc Hoa
- 2013 – (Vietnam) Đỗ Thị Minh
- 2014 – (Vietnam) Nguyễn Thị Xuân
- 2015 – (North Korea) Jong Jin-sim
- 2016 – (China) Yang Wenjing
- 2017 – (North Korea) Jong Jin-sim
- 2018 – (United States) Holly Toliver
- 2019 – (United States) Lindsay Stalzer
- 2024 – (Cuba) (Japan) Melissa Valdes
- 2026 – (Vietnam) Trần Thị Thanh Thúy

== See also ==
- VTV International Women's Volleyball Cup
- Memorial of Hubert Jerzy Wagner
- Montreux Volley Masters
- William Jones Cup
- FIBA Intercontinental Cup
- Merlion Cup (basketball)
- Guystac Trophy
- IIHF Development Cup
- Intersport Cup
- Carpathian Trophy (women's handball)
- Carpathian Trophy (men's handball)
