= 2017 VTV9 – Binh Dien International Women's Volleyball Cup =

2017 VTV9 - Binh Dien International Women's Volleyball Cup
Tournament details
- Host country: Vietnam
- Dates: April 22–30, 2017
- Teams: 8
- Venue: 1 (in 1 host city)

Final positions
- Champions: (Thailand) Bangkok Glass VC (1st title)

Tournament awards
- MVP: (North Korea) Jong Jin Sim

The 2017 VTV9 - Binh Dien International Women's Volleyball Cup was the 11th staging . The tournament was held in Tây Ninh, Vietnam.

== Pools composition ==
Pool A	Pool B
(Vietnam) VTV Bình Điền Long An (Host) (Kazakhstan) Altay VC (China) Yunnan (Vietnam) Thông tin LVPB	(Vietnam) Vietinbank (Thailand) Bangkok Glass (North Korea) April 25 Sports Club (China) Fujian

== Pool standing procedure ==
1. Number of matches won
2. Match points
3. Sets ratio
4. Points ratio
5. Result of the last match between the tied teams

Match won 3–0 or 3–1: 3 match points for the winner, 0 match points for the loser
Match won 3–2: 2 match points for the winner, 1 match point for the loser

== Preliminary round ==
- All times are Vietnam Standard Time (UTC+07:00).

=== Pool A ===
Pos	Team	Pld	W	L	Pts	SW	SL	SR	SPW	SPL	SPR	Qualification
1	(China) Yunnan	3	3	0	8	9	4	2.250	305	272	1.121	Semifinals
2	(Vietnam) VTV Bình Điền Long An	3	2	1	6	7	4	1.750	252	219	1.151	Semifinals
3	(Vietnam) Thông tin LVPB	3	1	2	4	6	6	1.000	260	270	0.963	Classification 5th-8th
4	(Kazakhstan) Altay VC	3	0	3	0	1	9	0.111	184	240	0.767	Classification 5th-8th

Date	Time		Score		Set 1	Set 2	Set 3	Set 4	Set 5	Total	Report
22 Apr	16:30	Thông tin LVPB (Vietnam)	2–3	(China) Yunnan	26–28	25–23	24–26	30–28	10–15	115–120	
22 Apr	20:00	VTV Bình Điền Long An (Vietnam)	3–0	(Kazakhstan) Altay VC	25–19	25–19	25–16			75–54	
24 Apr	16:30	Altay VC (Kazakhstan)	0–3	(Vietnam) Thông tin LVPB	19–25	11–25	18–25			48–75	
24 Apr	19:00	VTV Bình Điền Long An (Vietnam)	1–3	(China) Yunnan	19–25	15–25	25–13	23–25		82–88	
26 Apr	16:30	Yunnan (China)	3–1	(Kazakhstan) Altay VC	22–25	25–20	25–12	25–18		97–75	
26 Apr	19:00	VTV Bình Điền Long An (Vietnam)	3–1	(Vietnam) Thông tin LVPB	25–16	25–22	20–25	25–14		95–77	

=== Pool B ===
Pos	Team	Pld	W	L	Pts	SW	SL	SR	SPW	SPL	SPR	Qualification
1	(North Korea) April 25 Sports Club	3	2	1	7	8	4	2.000	285	223	1.278	Semifinals
2	(Thailand) Bangkok Glass	3	2	1	6	7	5	1.400	229	236	0.970	Semifinals
3	(China) Fujian	3	2	1	4	7	7	1.000	281	264	1.064	Classification 5th-8th
4	(Vietnam) Vietinbank	3	0	3	1	3	9	0.333	176	248	0.710	Classification 5th-8th

Date	Time		Score		Set 1	Set 2	Set 3	Set 4	Set 5	Total	Report
23 Apr	16:30	Fujian (China)	3–2	(North Korea) April 25 Sports Club	20–25	20–25	25–16	25–19	15–7	105–92	
23 Apr	19:00	Vietinbank (Vietnam)	1–3	(Thailand) Bangkok Glass	24–26	25–19	20–25	22–25		91–95	
25 Apr	16:30	Bangkok Glass (Thailand)	3–1	(China) Fujian	25–18	25–22	10–25	25–18		85–83	
25 Apr	19:00	Vietinbank (Vietnam)	0–3	(North Korea) April 25 Sports Club	28–30	17–25	17–25			62–80	
27 Apr	16:30	April 25 Sports Club (North Korea)	3–1	(Thailand) Bangkok Glass	25–15	25–19	22–25	25–20		97–79	
27 Apr	19:00	Vietinbank (Vietnam)	2–3	(China) Fujian	22–25	14–25	25–16	25–20	13–15	99–101	

== Classification 5th-8th ==
- All times are Vietnam Standard Time (UTC+07:00).

Classification 5th-8th
22 October
(China) Fujian	3
(Kazakhstan) Altay VC	0
22 October
(Vietnam) Vietinbank	3
(Vietnam) Thông tin LVPB	0

5th place match
23 October
(China) Fujian	3
(Vietnam) Vietinbank	2
7th place match
23 October
(Vietnam) Thông tin LVPB	3
(Kazakhstan) Altay VC	0

=== Classification 5th-8th ===
Date	Time		Score		Set 1	Set 2	Set 3	Set 4	Set 5	Total	Report
29 Apr	10:00	Fujian (China)	3–0	(Kazakhstan) Altay VC	25–7	25–12	25–20			75–39	
29 Apr	16:30	Vietinbank (Vietnam)	3–0	(Vietnam) Thông tin LVPB	25–20	25–21	25–15			75–56	

=== 7th place ===
Date	Time		Score		Set 1	Set 2	Set 3	Set 4	Set 5	Total	Report
30 Apr	16:00	Thông tin LVPB (Vietnam)	3–0	(Kazakhstan) Altay VC	25–16	25–23	25–20			75–59	

=== 5th place ===
Date	Time		Score		Set 1	Set 2	Set 3	Set 4	Set 5	Total	Report
30 Apr	10:00	Fujian (China)	3–0	(Vietnam) Vietinbank	25-17	25–17	25–22			75–39	

== Final round ==
- All times are Vietnam Standard Time (UTC+07:00).

Semifinals
29 April
(Thailand) Bangkok Glass	3
(China) Yunnan	0
29 April
(North Korea) April 25 Sports Club	0
(Vietnam) VTV Bình Điền Long An	3

Final
30 April
(Thailand) Bangkok Glass	3
(Vietnam) VTV Bình Điền Long An	1
3rd place match
30 April
(China) Yunnan	3
(North Korea) April 25 Sports Club	2

=== Semifinals ===
Date	Time		Score		Set 1	Set 2	Set 3	Set 4	Set 5	Total	Report
29 Apr	13:00	Bangkok Glass (Thailand)	3–0	(China) Yunnan	25–14	25–17	25–19			75–50	
29 Apr	19:30	April 25 Sports Club (North Korea)	0–3	(Vietnam) VTV Bình Điền Long An	20–25	23–25	21–25			64–75	

=== 3rd place match ===
Date	Time		Score		Set 1	Set 2	Set 3	Set 4	Set 5	Total	Report
30 Apr	13:00	Yunnan (China)	3–2	(North Korea) April 25 Sports Club	22–25	23–25	27–25	25–18	15–11	112–104	

=== Final ===
Date	Time		Score		Set 1	Set 2	Set 3	Set 4	Set 5	Total	Report
30 Apr	19:00	Bangkok Glass (Thailand)	3–1	(Vietnam) VTV Bình Điền Long An	25–23	22–25	25–15	25–22		97–85	

== Final standing ==
Rank	Team
1st place, gold medalist(s)	(Thailand) Bangkok Glass
2nd place, silver medalist(s)	(Vietnam) VTV Bình Điền Long An
3rd place, bronze medalist(s)	(China) Yunnan
4	(North Korea) April 25 Sports Club
5	(China) Fujian
6	(Vietnam) Vietinbank
7	(Vietnam) Thông tin LVPB
8	(Kazakhstan) Altay VC

2017 VTV9 - Binh Dien Women's Volleyball Cup

1st title

== Awards ==
- Most valuable player
  (North Korea) Jong Jin Sim (April 25 Sports Club)
- Best setter
  (Thailand) Pornpun Guedpard (Bangkok Glass)
- Best outside hitters
  (Vietnam) Trần Thị Thanh Thúy (VTV Bình Điền Long An)
  (China) Sun Fang Qiong (Yunnan)
- Best middle blockers
  (Thailand) Pleumjit Thinkaow (Bangkok Glass)
  (Vietnam) Nguyễn Thị Ngọc Hoa (VTV Bình Điền Long An)
- Best opposite spiker
  (Vietnam) Nguyễn Thị Ngọc Hoa (VTV Bình Điền Long An)
- Best libero
  (Thailand) Tikamporn Changkeaw (Bangkok Glass)
- Best Young Player
  (Vietnam) Trần Thị Thanh Thúy (VTV Bình Điền Long An)

== See also ==
- VTV9 - Binh Dien International Women's Volleyball Cup
