= 2013 VTV9 – Binh Dien International Women's Volleyball Cup =

2013 women's volleyball tournament in Gia Lai, Vietnam

2013 VTV9 - Binh Dien International Women's Volleyball Cup
Tournament details
- Host country: Vietnam
- Dates: March 2–10
- Teams: 8
- Venue: 1 (in 1 host city)

Final positions
- Champions: (Vietnam) Thông tin LVPB (2nd title)

The 2013 VTV9 - Binh Dien International Women's Volleyball Cup was the 7th staging . The tournament was held in Gia Lai, Vietnam.

== Pools composition ==
Pool A	Pool B
(Vietnam) VTV Bình Điền Long An (Host) (South Korea) Yangsan (Vietnam) Thông tin LVPB (Vietnam) Vietsov Petro	(Vietnam) Vietinbank; Australia (Kazakhstan) Karaganda (Vietnam) Tân Bình TP.HCM

== Pool standing procedure ==
1. Number of matches won
2. Match points
3. Sets ratio
4. Points ratio
5. Result of the last match between the tied teams

Match won 3–0 or 3–1: 3 match points for the winner, 0 match points for the loser
Match won 3–2: 2 match points for the winner, 1 match point for the loser

== Preliminary round ==
- All times are Vietnam Standard Time (UTC+07:00).

Qualified for the Semifinals
Qualified for the Classification 5th-8th
