= Nguyễn Thị Kim Liên =

Vietnamese volleyball player (born 1993)

Personal information
- Full name: Nguyễn Thị Kim Liên
- Nickname: Tiêu
- Nationality: Vietnam
- Born: February 10, 1993 (age 33) Long An, Vietnam
- Height: 1.60 m (5 ft 3 in)
- Weight: 55 kg (121 lb)
- Spike: 270 cm (8 ft 10 in)
- Block: 265 cm (8 ft 8 in)

Volleyball information
- Position: Libero
- Current club: (Vietnam) Thanh Hóa VC
- Number: 8

Career
- Years: Team
- 2006 – 2021: (Vietnam) VTV Bình Điền Long An
- 2013 – 2014: (Thailand) Idea Khonkaen (loan)
- 2022: (Vietnam) Than Quảng Ninh VC
- 2023 – 2025: (Vietnam) LP Bank Ninh Bình
- 2026 – present: (Vietnam) Thanh Hóa VC

National team
- Years: Team
- 2009 – 2023: Vietnam
Honours
Women's volleyball
Representing Vietnam
Asian Challenge Cup
Gold medal – first place	2023 Gresik	Team
Southeast Asian Games
Silver medal – second place	2011 Palembang	Team
Silver medal – second place	2013 Naypyidaw	Team
Silver medal – second place	2019 Pasig	Team
Silver medal – second place	2021 Quảng Ninh	Team
Bronze medal – third place	2017 Kuala Lumpur	Team
SEA V.League
Silver medal – second place	2022 Nakhon Ratchasima	Team
Silver medal – second place	2023 Vĩnh Phúc	Team

Nguyễn Thị Kim Liên (born February 10, 1993) is a Vietnamese volleyball player. She is a member of Vietnam women's national volleyball team and Thanh Hóa volleyball club.

== Clubs ==
- (Vietnam) VTV Bình Điền Long An (2006 – 2021)
- (Thailand) Idea Khonkaen (2013 – 2014) (loan)
- (Vietnam) Than Quảng Ninh VC (2022)
- (Vietnam) LP Bank Ninh Bình (2023 – 2025)
- (Vietnam) Thanh Hóa VC (2026 – )

== Career ==
=== National teams ===
- 2010 Asian Cup — 7th Place
- 2011 Asian Championship — 7th Place
- 2011 SEA Games — Silver Medal
- 2013 SEA Games — Silver Medal
- 2014 Asian Cup — 8th Place
- 2016 Asian Cup — 7th Place
- 2017 Asian Championship — 5th Place
- 2017 SEA Games — Bronze Medal
- 2018 Asian Games — 6th Place
- 2018 Asian Cup — 5th Place
- 2019 ASEAN Grand Prix — 4th Place
- 2019 SEA Games — Silver Medal
- 2021 SEA Games — Silver Medal
- 2022 Asian Cup — 4th Place
- 2022 ASEAN Grand Prix — Runner-up
- 2023 Asian Challenge Cup — Champion
- 2023 FIVB Challenger Cup — 8th Place
- 2023 SEA V.League – First Leg — Runner-up

=== Clubs ===
- 2009 Vietnam League – Champion, with VTV Bình Điền Long An
- 2010 Vietnam League – 3rd Place, with VTV Bình Điền Long An
- 2011 Vietnam League – Champion, with VTV Bình Điền Long An
- 2012 Vietnam League – 3rd Place, with VTV Bình Điền Long An
- 2014 Vietnam League – Runner-up, with VTV Bình Điền Long An
- 2015 Vietnam League – 3rd Place, with VTV Bình Điền Long An
- 2016 Vietnam League – 3rd Place, with VTV Bình Điền Long An
- 2017 Vietnam League – Champion, with VTV Bình Điền Long An
- 2018 Vietnam League – Champion, with VTV Bình Điền Long An
- 2023 Vietnam League – Champion, with LP Bank Ninh Bình
- 2024 Asian Club Championship – Runner-up, with LP Bank Ninh Bình
- 2024 Vietnam League – 3rd Place, with LP Bank Ninh Bình
- 2025 Vietnam League – Runner-up, with LP Bank Ninh Bình

== Awards ==
- 2014 VTV9 - Binh Dien International Cup "Best libero"
- 2014 VTV Cup "Best libero"
- 2016 VTV Cup "Best libero"
- 2017 Vietnam League "Best digger"
- 2018 VTV9 - Binh Dien International Cup "Best libero"
- 2018 VTV Cup "Best libero"
- 2018 Vietnam League "Best digger"
- 2019 VTV9 - Binh Dien International Cup "Best libero"
- 2019 ASEAN Grand Prix – First Leg "Best libero"
- 2023 Vietnam League "Best digger"
