= Phạm Thị Kim Huệ =

Vietnamese volleyball player (born 1982)

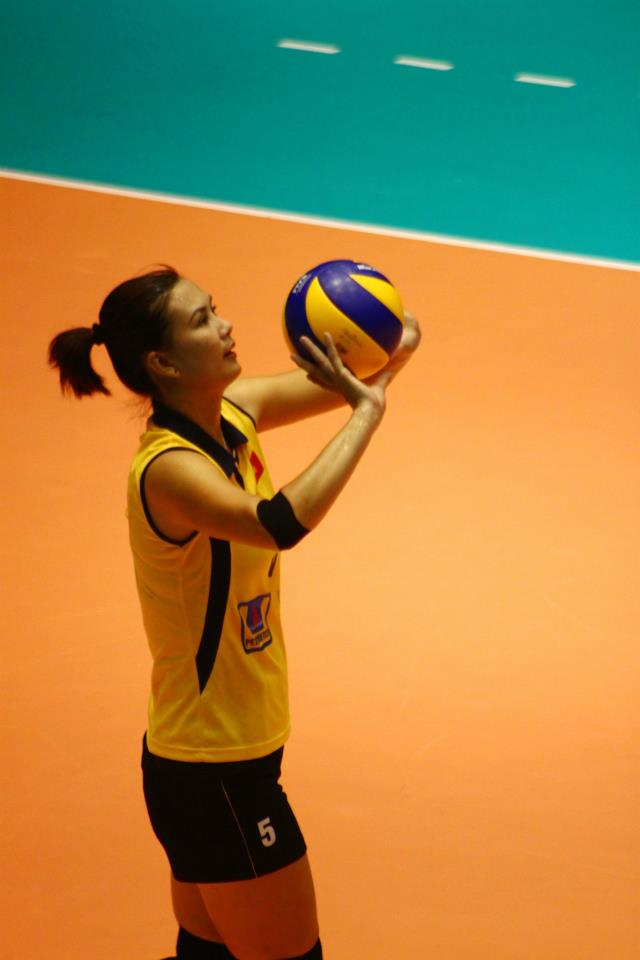

Personal information
- Full name: Phạm Thị Kim Huệ
- Born: August 3, 1982 (age 44) Hanoi, Vietnam
- Height: 1.82 m (6 ft 0 in)
- Weight: 70 kg (154 lb)
- Spike: 310 cm (10 ft 2 in)
- Block: 302 cm (9 ft 11 in)

Volleyball information
- Position: Middle Blocker
- Number: 5 (club and national team)

Career
- Years: Team
- 1995 – 2011: (Vietnam) Thông tin Liên Việt Post Bank
- 2012 – 2019: (Vietnam) Vietinbank VC

National team
- Years: Team
- 1998 – 2017: Vietnam

Phạm Thị Kim Huệ (born August 3, 1982) is a retired Vietnamese volleyball player.

== Clubs ==
- (Vietnam) Thông tin Liên Việt Post Bank (1995 – 2011)
- (Vietnam) Vietinbank VC (2012 – 2019)

== Awards ==
=== Individual ===
- 1998 Asian Junior Championship "Miss Volleyball"
- 2003 Asian Championship "Miss Volleyball"
- 2004 VTV Cup "Miss Volleyball"
- 2006 VTV9 - Binh Dien International Cup "Most Valuable Player"
- 2010 VTV9 - Binh Dien International Cup "Best Middle Blocker"
- 2011 VTV9 - Binh Dien International Cup "Most Valuable Player"
- 2011 Asian Club Championship "Best Middle Blocker"

=== Clubs ===
- 2004 Vietnam League - Champion, with Thông tin Liên Việt Post Bank
- 2005 Vietnam League - Champion, with Thông tin Liên Việt Post Bank
- 2006 Vietnam League - Champion, with Thông tin Liên Việt Post Bank
- 2009 Vietnam League - Runner-Up, with Thông tin Liên Việt Post Bank
- 2010 Vietnam League - Champion, with Thông tin Liên Việt Post Bank
- 2011 Vietnam League - Runner-Up, with Thông tin Liên Việt Post Bank
- 2012 Vietnam League - Runner-Up, with Vietinbank VC
- 2013 Vietnam League - Runner-Up, with Vietinbank VC
- 2014 Vietnam League - Bronze medal, with Vietinbank VC
- 2015 Vietnam League - Runner-Up, with Vietinbank VC
- 2016 Vietnam League - Champion, with Vietinbank VC
- 2017 Vietnam League - Bronze medal, with Vietinbank VC
- 2018 Vietnam League - Bronze medal, with Vietinbank VC
