= Hà Thị Hoa =

Vietnamese volleyball player (born 1984)

Personal information
- Full name: Hà Thị Hoa
- Born: May 16, 1984 (age 42); Hải Phòng, Vietnam
- Height: 1.75 m (5 ft 9 in)
- Weight: 77 kg (170 lb)
- Spike: 285 cm (9 ft 4 in)
- Block: 270 cm (8 ft 10 in)

Volleyball information
- Position: Setter
- Number: 7

National team
2007-2013	Vietnam

Hà Thị Hoa (born May 16, 1984) is a member of the Vietnam women's national volleyball team.

== Clubs ==
- (Vietnam) Thông tin Liên Việt Post Bank (1999-2001)
- (Vietnam) Vietinbank VC (2005-2019)

== Awards ==
=== Individuals ===
- 2009 VTV Binh Dien International Cup "Best Setter"
- 2011 VTV Binh Dien International Cup "Best Setter"
- 2012 VTV Binh Dien International Cup "Best Setter"

=== Clubs ===
- 2006 Vietnam League - Bronze medal, with Vietinbank VC
- 2007 Vietnam League - Bronze medal, with Vietinbank VC
- 2011 Vietnam League - Bronze medal, with Vietinbank VC
- 2012 Vietnam League - Runner-Up, with Vietinbank VC
- 2013 Vietnam League - Runner-Up, with Vietinbank VC
- 2014 Vietnam League - Bronze medal, with Vietinbank VC
- 2015 Vietnam League - Runner-Up, with Vietinbank VC
- 2016 Vietnam League - Champion, with Vietinbank VC
