= 2024 VTV9 – Binh Dien International Women's Volleyball Cup =

Tournament details
- Host country: Vietnam
- Dates: 11–19 May 2024
- Teams: 8
- Venue: 1 (in 1 host city)

Final positions
- Champions: (Japan) PFU BlueCats (1st title)

Tournament awards
- MVP: (Cuba) (Japan) Melissa Valdes

The 2024 VTV9 – Binh Dien International Women's Volleyball Cup is the 14th iteration of the VTV9 - Binh Dien International Women's Volleyball Cup. The tournament was held in Đắk Lắk, Vietnam.

== Pools ==
Pool A	Pool B
VTV Bình Điền Long An (Host); Đức Giang Chemical; Vietnam U20 (Japan) PFU BlueCats	(Vietnam) Binh chủng Thông tin - Trường Tươi Bình Phước (Vietnam) LP Bank Ninh Bình; Thailand U20 (China) Sichuan

== Pool standing procedure ==
1. Number of matches won
2. Match points
3. Sets ratio
4. Points ratio
5. Result of the last match between the tied teams

Match won 3–0 or 3–1: 3 match points for the winner, 0 match points for the loser
Match won 3–2: 2 match points for the winner, 1 match point for the loser

== Preliminary round ==
- All times are Vietnam Standard Time (UTC+07:00).

=== Pool A ===
Pos	Team	Pld	W	L	Pts	SW	SL	SR	SPW	SPL	SPR	Qualification
1	(Japan) PFU BlueCats	3	3	0	9	9	2	4.500	270	210	1.286	Semifinals
2	(Vietnam) VTV Bình Điền Long An	3	2	1	4	7	7	1.000	277	298	0.930	Semifinals
3	(Vietnam) Đức Giang Chemical	3	1	2	4	5	6	0.833	247	220	1.123	5th–8th semifinals
4	Vietnam U20	3	0	3	1	3	9	0.333	213	279	0.763	5th–8th semifinals

Date	Time		Score		Set 1	Set 2	Set 3	Set 4	Set 5	Total	Report
11 May	14:00	Đức Giang Chemical (Vietnam)	3–0	Vietnam U20	25–14	25–13	25–15			75–42	
11 May	20:10	VTV Bình Điền Long An (Vietnam)	1–3	(Japan) PFU BlueCats	25–22	11–25	15–25	17–25		68–97	
12 May	17:00	Đức Giang Chemical (Vietnam)	0–3	(Japan) PFU BlueCats	21–25	24–26	14–25			59–76	
12 May	20:00	Vietnam U20	2–3	(Vietnam) VTV Bình Điền Long An	15–25	25–18	26–24	17–25	5–15	88–107	
13 May	20:00	Đức Giang Chemical (Vietnam)	2–3	(Vietnam) VTV Bình Điền Long An	25–20	23–25	25–12	28–30	12–15	113–102	
14 May	14:00	PFU BlueCats (Japan)	3–1	Vietnam U20	25–22	22–25	25–23	25–13		97–83	

=== Pool B ===
Pos	Team	Pld	W	L	Pts	SW	SL	SR	SPW	SPL	SPR	Qualification
1	(Vietnam) LP Bank Ninh Bình	3	2	1	6	7	3	2.333	246	205	1.200	Semifinals
2	(Vietnam) BC Thông tin - TTBP	3	2	1	6	8	6	1.333	309	301	1.027	Semifinals
3	(China) Sichuan	3	1	2	4	5	7	0.714	263	271	0.970	5th–8th semifinals
4	Thailand U20	3	1	2	2	4	8	0.500	241	282	0.855	5th–8th semifinals

Date	Time		Score		Set 1	Set 2	Set 3	Set 4	Set 5	Total	Report
11 May	17:00	Sichuan (China)	0–3	(Vietnam) LP Bank Ninh Bình	24–26	18–25	16–25			58–76	
12 May	14:00	Thailand U20	3–2	(Vietnam) BC Thông tin - TTBP	25–22	18–25	25–23	17–25	15–13	100–108	
13 May	14:00	Sichuan (China)	2–3	(Vietnam) BC Thông tin - TTBP	25–23	25–21	20–25	23–25	13–15	106–109	
13 May	17:00	LP Bank Ninh Bình (Vietnam)	3–0	Thailand U20	25–19	25–18	25–18			75–55	
14 May	17:00	Sichuan (China)	3–1	Thailand U20	25–18	24–26	25–19	25–23		99–86	
14 May	20:00	BC Thông tin - TTBP (Vietnam)	3–1	(Vietnam) LP Bank Ninh Bình	27–25	25–23	15–25	25–22		92–95	

== Classification 5th–8th ==
- All times are Vietnam Standard Time (UTC+07:00).

5th–8th semifinals
16 May
(Vietnam) Đức Giang Chemical	3
Thailand U20	0
17 May
(China) Sichuan	3
Vietnam U20	0

5th place match
19 May
(Vietnam) Đức Giang Chemical	3
(China) Sichuan	1
7th place match
18 May
Thailand U20	3
Vietnam U20	1

=== 5th–8th semifinals ===
Date	Time		Score		Set 1	Set 2	Set 3	Set 4	Set 5	Total	Report
16 May	17:00	Đức Giang Chemical (Vietnam)	3–0	Thailand U20	25–19	25–13	25–19			75–51	
17 May	17:00	Sichuan (China)	3–0	Vietnam U20	25–22	25–20	25–22			75–64	

=== 7th place match ===
Date	Time		Score		Set 1	Set 2	Set 3	Set 4	Set 5	Total	Report
18 May	17:00	Thailand U20	3–1	Vietnam U20	25–20	25–17	21–25	25–19		96–81	

=== 5th place match ===
Date	Time		Score		Set 1	Set 2	Set 3	Set 4	Set 5	Total	Report
19 May	17:00	Đức Giang Chemical (Vietnam)	3–1	(China) Sichuan	17–25	25–16	25–21	25–19		92–81	

== Final round ==
- All times are Vietnam Standard Time (UTC+07:00).

Semifinals
16 May
(Japan) PFU BlueCats	3
(Vietnam) BC Thông tin - TTBP	0
17 May
(Vietnam) LP Bank Ninh Bình	3
(Vietnam) VTV Bình Điền Long An	0

Final
19 May
(Japan) PFU BlueCats	3
(Vietnam) LP Bank Ninh Bình	1
3rd place match
18 May
(Vietnam) BC Thông tin - TTBP	3
(Vietnam) VTV Bình Điền Long An	0

=== Semifinals ===
Date	Time		Score		Set 1	Set 2	Set 3	Set 4	Set 5	Total	Report
16 May	20:10	PFU BlueCats (Japan)	3–0	(Vietnam) BC Thông tin - TTBP	25–17	25–17	25–21			75–55	
17 May	20:10	LP Bank Ninh Bình (Vietnam)	3–0	(Vietnam) VTV Bình Điền Long An	25–22	25–23	25–22			75–67	

=== 3rd place match ===
Date	Time		Score		Set 1	Set 2	Set 3	Set 4	Set 5	Total	Report
18 May	20:10	BC Thông tin - TTBP (Vietnam)	3–0	(Vietnam) VTV Bình Điền Long An	25–21	25–17	25–22			75–60	

=== Final ===
Date	Time		Score		Set 1	Set 2	Set 3	Set 4	Set 5	Total	Report
19 May	20:10	PFU BlueCats (Japan)	3–1	(Vietnam) LP Bank Ninh Bình	18–25	30–28	25–18	25–22		98–93	

== Final standing ==
Rank	Team
1st place, gold medalist(s)	(Japan) PFU BlueCats
2nd place, silver medalist(s)	(Vietnam) LP Bank Ninh Bình
3rd place, bronze medalist(s)	(Vietnam) Binh chủng Thông tin - TTBP
4	(Vietnam) VTV Bình Điền Long An
5	(Vietnam) Đức Giang Chemical
6	(China) Sichuan
7	Thailand U20
8	Vietnam U20

2024 VTV9 – Binh Dien Cup champions
(Japan)
PFU BlueCats
1st title

== Awards ==
- Most valuable player
  (Cuba) (Japan) Melissa Valdes (PFU BlueCats)
- Best setter
  (Japan) Yuki Fujikura (PFU BlueCats)
- Best outside hitters
  (China) Chen Peiyan (VTV Bình Điền Long An)
  (Vietnam) Vi Thị Như Quỳnh (Binh chủng Thông tin - TTBP)
- Best middle blockers
  (Japan) Aya Hosonuma (PFU BlueCats)
  (Vietnam) Nguyễn Thị Trinh (LP Bank Ninh Bình)
- Best opposite spiker
  (Vietnam) Nguyễn Thị Bích Tuyền (LP Bank Ninh Bình)
- Best libero
  (Vietnam) Nguyễn Khánh Đang (VTV Bình Điền Long An)
- Best Young Player
  Đặng Thị Hồng (Vietnam U20)
- Miss Volleyball
  (China) Chen Peiyan (VTV Bình Điền Long An)

== See also ==
- VTV9 – Binh Dien International Women's Volleyball Cup
