= 2015 VTV9 – Binh Dien International Women's Volleyball Cup =

2015 VTV9 - Binh Dien International Women's Volleyball Cup
Tournament details
- Host country: Vietnam
- Dates: March 21–29
- Teams: 9
- Venue: 1 (in 1 host city)

Final positions
- Champions: (North Korea) April 25 Sports Club (1st title)

Tournament awards
- MVP: (North Korea) Jong Jin Sim

The 2015 VTV9 Binh Dien International Women's Volleyball Cup was the 9th staging. The tournament was held in Quảng Trị, Vietnam, from March 21 to 29.

== Pools composition ==
Pool A	Pool B
(Vietnam) VTV Bình Điền Long An (Host) (Vietnam) Tiến Nông Thanh Hóa (North Korea) April 25 Sports Club; Malaysia (Japan) Tenri University	(Vietnam) Vietinbank (China) Fujian (Kazakhstan) Astana (Vietnam) Thông tin LVPB

== Pool standing procedure ==
1. Number of matches won
2. Match points
3. Sets ratio
4. Points ratio
5. Result of the last match between the tied teams

Match won 3–0 or 3–1: 3 match points for the winner, 0 match points for the loser
Match won 3–2: 2 match points for the winner, 1 match point for the loser

== Preliminary round ==
- All times are Vietnam Standard Time (UTC+07:00).

Qualified for the Semifinals
Qualified for the Classification 5th-8th
