= Đinh Thị Thúy =

Vietnamese volleyball player (born 1998)

Personal information
- Full name: Đinh Thị Thúy
- Born: April 16, 1998 (age 28) Hà Nam, Vietnam
- Height: 1.75 m (5 ft 9 in)
- Weight: 64 kg (141 lb)
- Spike: 307 cm (10 ft 1 in)
- Block: 298 cm (9 ft 9 in)

Volleyball information
- Position: Outside hitter
- Current club: (Vietnam) LP Bank Ninh Bình
- Number: 16 (club); 27 (national team)

Career
- Years: Team
- 2012 – 2019: (Vietnam) Vietinbank VC
- 2019 – 2021: (Vietnam) Kinh Bắc Bắc Ninh
- 2022 – present: (Vietnam) LP Bank Ninh Bình

National team
- Years: Team
- 2014 – 2018 2022 – 2023 2026: Vietnam

Đinh Thị Thúy (born April 16, 1998) is a member of the Vietnam women's national volleyball team.

== Clubs ==
- (Vietnam) Vietinbank VC (2012 – 2019)
- (Vietnam) Kinh Bắc Bắc Ninh (2019 – 2021)
- (Vietnam) LP Bank Ninh Bình (2022 – )

== Awards ==
=== Individuals ===
- 2016 VTV Binh Dien International Cup - "Best outside hitters"
- 2020 Vietnam League "Best spiker"

=== Clubs ===
- 2014 Vietnam League - 3rd Place, with Vietinbank VC
- 2015 Vietnam League - Runner-up, with Vietinbank VC
- 2016 Vietnam League - Champion, with Vietinbank VC
- 2017 Vietnam League - 3rd Place, with Vietinbank VC
- 2018 Vietnam League - 3rd Place, with Vietinbank VC
- 2019 Vietnam League - 3rd Place, with Kinh Bắc Bắc Ninh
- 2020 Vietnam League - 3rd Place, with Kinh Bắc Bắc Ninh
- 2023 Vietnam League - Champion, with LP Bank Ninh Bình
- 2024 Asian Club Championship — Runner-up, with LP Bank Ninh Bình
- 2024 Vietnam League - 3rd Place, with LP Bank Ninh Bình
- 2025 Vietnam League - Runner-up, with LP Bank Ninh Bình
