= 2012 VTV9 – Binh Dien International Women's Volleyball Cup =

2012 VTV9 - Binh Dien International Women's Volleyball Cup
Tournament details
- Host country: Vietnam
- Dates: February 18–26
- Teams: 8
- Venue: 1 (in 1 host city)

Final positions
- Champions: (China) Jiangsu (1st title)

Tournament awards
- MVP: (Vietnam) Nguyễn Thị Ngọc Hoa

The 2012 VTV9 - Binh Dien International Women's Volleyball Cup was the 6th staging. The tournament was held in Hậu Giang, Vietnam.

== Pools composition ==
Pool A	Pool B
(Vietnam) VTV Bình Điền Long An (Host) (China) Jiangsu (Thailand) Air Asia-Suans (Vietnam) Vietinbank	(Vietnam) Thông tin LVPB; Australia (South Korea) Yangsan (Vietnam) Xây lắp dầu khí Thái Bình Dương

== Pool standing procedure ==
1. Number of matches won
2. Match points
3. Sets ratio
4. Points ratio
5. Result of the last match between the tied teams

Match won 3–0 or 3–1: 3 match points for the winner, 0 match points for the loser
Match won 3–2: 2 match points for the winner, 1 match point for the loser

== Preliminary round ==
- All times are Vietnam Standard Time (UTC+07:00).

Qualified for the Semifinals
Qualified for the Classification 5th-8th
