= 2014 VTV9 – Binh Dien International Women's Volleyball Cup =

2014 VTV9 - Binh Dien International Women's Volleyball Cup
Tournament details
- Host country: Vietnam
- Dates: March 3–11
- Teams: 8
- Venue: 1 (in 1 host city)

Final positions
- Champions: (Vietnam) Thông tin LVPB (3rd title)

Tournament awards
- MVP: (Vietnam) Nguyễn Thị Xuân

The 2014 VTV9 - Binh Dien International Women's Volleyball Cup was the 8th staging . The tournament was held in Gia Nghĩa Provincial City, Đắc Nông, Vietnam.

== Pools composition ==
Pool A	Pool B
(Vietnam) VTV Bình Điền Long An (Host); Myanmar (China) Weifang (Vietnam) Tien Nong Thanh Hoa	(Vietnam) Vietinbank (China) Shandong Laishang Bank (Vietnam) Cao Su Phu Rieng (Vietnam) Thông tin LVPB

== Pool standing procedure ==
1. Number of matches won
2. Match points
3. Sets ratio
4. Points ratio
5. Result of the last match between the tied teams

Match won 3–0 or 3–1: 3 match points for the winner, 0 match points for the loser
Match won 3–2: 2 match points for the winner, 1 match point for the loser

== Preliminary round ==
- All times are Vietnam Standard Time (UTC+07:00).

Qualified for the Semifinals
Qualified for the Classification 5th-8th
