= 2006 VTV9 – Binh Dien International Women's Volleyball Cup =

2006 VTV9 - Binh Dien International Women's Volleyball Cup
Tournament details
- Host country: Vietnam
- Dates: January 13–19
- Teams: 8
- Venue: 1 (in 1 host city)

Final positions
- Champions: (Vietnam) Vietinbank (1st title)

Tournament awards
- MVP: (Vietnam) Nguyễn Thị Ngọc Hoa

The 2006 VTV9 - Binh Dien International Women's Volleyball Cup was the 1st staging . The tournament was held in Vĩnh Phúc, Vietnam with 8 teams participated.

== Pools composition ==
Pool

(Vietnam) VTV Bình Điền Long An (Host)
(Vietnam) Vietinbank
(Vietnam) Giấy Bãi Bằng
(Vietnam) Thông tin LVPB
(Vietnam) Vital Thái Bình

== Pool standing procedure ==
1. Number of matches won
2. Match points
3. Sets ratio
4. Points ratio
5. Result of the last match between the tied teams

Match won 3–0 or 3–1: 3 match points for the winner, 0 match points for the loser
Match won 3–2: 2 match points for the winner, 1 match point for the loser

== Preliminary round ==
- All times are Vietnam Standard Time (UTC+07:00).

| Qualified for the Semifinals |
| Qualified for the Classification 5th-8th |
