= 2010 VTV9 – Binh Dien International Women's Volleyball Cup =

2010 VTV9 - Binh Dien International Women's Volleyball Cup
Tournament details
- Host country: Vietnam
- Dates: March 3–11
- Teams: 8
- Venue: 1 (in 1 host city)

Final positions
- Champions: (Vietnam) VTV Bình Điền Long An (2nd title)

Tournament awards
- MVP: (Vietnam) Nguyễn Thị Ngọc Hoa

The 2010 VTV9 - Binh Dien International Women's Volleyball Cup was the 5th staging. The tournament was held in Gia Lai, Vietnam.

The champion was VTV Bình Điền Long An.

== Pools composition ==
| Pool A | Pool B |
|---|---|
| (Vietnam) VTV Bình Điền Long An (Host); Thailand U20 (China) Shandong Laishang Bank (Vietnam) PV Oil Thái Bình | (Vietnam) Vietsov Petro (China) Nanjing; Chinese Taipei (Vietnam) Thông tin LVPB |

== Pool standing procedure ==
1. Number of matches won
2. Match points
3. Sets ratio
4. Points ratio
5. Result of the last match between the tied teams

Match won 3–0 or 3–1: 3 match points for the winner, 0 match points for the loser
Match won 3–2: 2 match points for the winner, 1 match point for the loser
