= Roni Jones-Perry =

American volleyball player

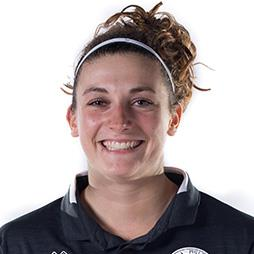
- Jones-Perry in 2020

Personal information
- Full name: Veronica Jones-Perry
- Nickname: Roni
- Nationality: (United States) American
- Born: January 20, 1997 (age 29)
- Home town: West Jordan, Utah, U.S.
- Education: Brigham Young University
- Height: 6 ft 0 in (1.83 m)
- Spike: 122 in (311 cm)
- Block: 114 in (289 cm)

Volleyball information
- Position: Outside hitter/Opposite
- Current club: (United States) LOVB Salt Lake
- Number: 12

Career
- Years: Team
- 2015–2018: (United States) BYU
- 2019–2020: (Italy) Volley Millenium Brescia
- 2019–2020: (Poland) Radomka Radom ([[:pl Radom|pl]])
- 2020–2021: (Poland) Budowlani Łódź
- 2021–2022: (Poland) ŁKS Commercecon Łódź
- 2022–2024: (Brazil) Sesc-RJ/Flamengo
- 2024–present: (United States) LOVB Salt Lake
- 2025: (Vietnam) VTV Bình Điền Long An (loan)

National team
- Years: Team
- 2019–: United States
Medal record
Women's volleyball
Representing United States
Pan-American Cup
Gold medal – first place	2019 Trujillo/Chiclayo
Bronze medal – third place	2021 Santo Domingo
Bronze medal – third place	2022 Hermosillo
Pan-American Cup Final Six
Silver medal – second place	2022 Santo Domingo
NORCECA Champions Cup
Gold medal – first place	2019 Colorado Springs

Veronica "Roni" Jones-Perry (born January 20, 1997) is an American professional volleyball player who has played as an outside hitter for the United States national team since 2019. Professionally, she currently plays in the United States for LOVB Salt Lake.

She previously played professional volleyball for the Italian Serie A1 team Volley Millenium Brescia and Polish teams Radomka Radom, Budowlani Łódź, ŁKS Commercecon Łódź, and Brazilian team Sesc-RJ/Flamengo.

She played collegiately at Brigham Young University, where she was an All-American in 2017 and 2018. She was named Utah's Female Athlete of the Year following her senior season.

== Early life ==
Jones-Perry, a native of West Jordan, Utah, was involved in gymnastics early in her life but was forced to quit the sport at age 11 due to her mother being laid off from her job. She briefly took on softball, but eventually settled on volleyball after her mother's coworker suggested that "gymnasts make good volleyball players". She played volleyball for her high school team at Copper Hills High School and for a club team. Her club coach suggested that she would not make it at the NCAA Division I level. Jones-Perry committed to getting more physically fit and increased her vertical jump by several inches. This dedication paid off, as several schools became interested in her, including BYU and the University of Utah.

Jones-Perry initially showed little interest in attending BYU as she is not a Mormon. However, she ultimately opened up to a campus visit and eventually committed to play for BYU.

== Career ==
=== College ===
At BYU, Jones-Perry improved each season. During her freshman season in 2015, she recorded 171 kills and was named to the conference's all-freshman team.

In 2017, her junior season, she had 569 kills and 655 total points, earning her AVCA Third Team All-American honors. In her final season in 2018, she earned AVCA First Team All-American and West Coast Conference Player of the Year honors. She helped BYU to a 2018 NCAA Final Four appearance, where she had eight kills and nine digs in the loss to the eventual national champion Stanford. Jones-Perry finished the 2018 season fourth in the nation in kills per set and points per set and helped BYU win 27 straight matches.

In April 2019, Jones-Perry was awarded Utah's Collegiate Female Athlete of the Year by the Utah Sports Commission.

=== Professional clubs ===
- 2019–2020: (Italy) Volley Millenium Brescia
- 2019–2020: (Poland) Radomka Radom (pl)
- 2020–2021: (Poland) Budowlani Łódź
- 2021–2022: (Poland) ŁKS Commercecon Łódź
- 2022–2024: (Brazil) Sesc-RJ/Flamengo
- 2024–present: (United States) LOVB Salt Lake
- 2025: (Vietnam) VTV Bình Điền Long An (loan)

Jones-Perry has played professionally in Italy, Poland, Brazil, and Vietnam. Notable performances include scoring 38 points on 67 attacks for Budowlani Łódź in a 3–1 defeat against Radomka Radom.

Jones-Perry was named the Most Valuable Player of the Polish Super Cup after helping Budowlani Łódź win the championship. During the season, she was named MVP of the match 9 times and scored a total of 518 points.

At the end of the 2022/23 season, Jones-Perry finished as the second-highest scorer behind only Tifanny, with a total of 485 points. She was named the best server with 39 aces.

She renewed her contract with Sesc RJ/Flamengo for the 2023-24 season, becoming a two-time Carioca champion in 2023. She helped the team lead the regular season and finish in third place in the 2023-24 Brazilian Superliga A. She was also a semifinalist in the 2024 Copa Brasil. By the Superliga semifinals, she had scored 414 points and ranked second in serving with 30 aces. The club announced her departure following the end of the season, and she is set to compete in the inaugural season of the League One Volleyball (LOVB), playing for LOVB Awaiting Final Club.

=== United States national team ===
Jones-Perry joined the national team in 2019. In the 2019 Pan-American Cup, she helped the U.S. win a gold medal, marking the team's third consecutive victory in the competition. Her top performance of the event came against Trinidad & Tobago, where she led the team with 14 points on 12 kills, a block, and an ace.

At the 2021 Pan-American Cup, Jones-Perry received the "Best Outside Hitter" award after leading the team to a bronze medal. She recorded 13 kills and 2 blocks, tying for a match-high 15 points among all players.

Jones-Perry helped the USA repeat as bronze medalists at the 2022 Pan-American Cup. She scored 24 points on 20 kills and 4 aces in the bronze medal match victory against hosts Mexico. In the USA's early quarterfinal loss to Colombia, Jones-Perry had 17 points on 15 kills and 2 blocks.

In 2019, Jones-Perry won a gold medal with the US in the NORCECA Champions Cup (later rebranded as the "Pan American Cup Final Six") tournament. She recorded 11 kills on 26 attacks and two aces, 22 excellent receptions, and nine digs in the championship match victory against the Dominican Republic.

Jones-Perry won a silver medal with the team at the Pan-American Cup Final Six tournament. Notable performances in the tournament included 13 points on 9 kills, one block, and three aces in a 3–0 win against Mexico.

== Awards and honors ==
=== Clubs ===
- 2021–2022 TAURON Liga – Bronze Medal, with ŁKS Commercecon Łódź.
- 2020–2021 Polish Super Cup – Champion, with Budowlani Łódź.
- 2020–2021 Polish Cup – Silver Medal, with Budowlani Łódź.
- 2020–2021 Grand Prix Polskiej Ligi Siatkówki – Bronze Medal, with Budowlani Łódź.
- 2025 Vietnam League – Champion, with VTV Bình Điền Long An

=== International ===
- 2021 Pan-American Cup – Best Outside Hitter
- 2020–2021 Polish Super Cup – Most Valuable Player

=== College ===
- Utah Female Athlete of the Year (Presented by Utah Sports Commission, 2019)
- AVCA First Team All-American (2018)
- AVCA Pacific South Region Player of the Year (2018)
- West Coast Conference Player of the Year (2018)
- Honda Sports Award finalist in volleyball (2018)
- AVCA Third Team All-American (2017)
- West Coast Conference All-Freshman Team (2015)
