= Trần Thị Thảo =

Vietnamese volleyball player (born 1991)

Personal information
- Full name: Trần Thị Thảo
- Born: November 24, 1991 Hà Nội Vietnam
- Height: 1.73 m (5 ft 8 in)
- Weight: 55 kg (121 lb)

Volleyball information
- Position: Opposite

National team
- Years: Team
- 2014: Vietnam

Trần Thị Thảo (born November 24, 1991) is a Vietnamese professional volleyball player who plays for Thong tin Lien Viet Post Bank and the Vietnam women's national volleyball team.

== Clubs ==
- (Vietnam) Thông tin Liên Việt Post Bank (? – 2017)

== Awards ==
=== Clubs ===
- 2010 Vietnam League - Champion, with Thông tin Liên Việt Post Bank
- 2011 Vietnam League - Runner-Up, with Thông tin Liên Việt Post Bank
- 2012 Vietnam League - Champion, with Thông tin Liên Việt Post Bank
- 2013 Vietnam League - Champion, with Thông tin Liên Việt Post Bank
- 2014 Vietnam League - Champion, with Thông tin Liên Việt Post Bank
- 2015 Vietnam League - Champion, with Thông tin Liên Việt Post Bank
- 2016 Vietnam League - Runner-Up, with Thông tin Liên Việt Post Bank
- 2017 Vietnam League - Runner-Up, with Thông tin Liên Việt Post Bank
