= 2018 Women's Volleyball Kor Royal Cup =

2018 Women's Kor Royal Cup
Tournament details
- Host country: Sisaket, Thailand
- Dates: 27 June – 1 July
- Teams: 6
- Venue: 1 (in 1 host city)

Final positions
- Champions: PEA Sisaket (N/Ath title)
- Runners-up: (Vietnam) VTV Bình Điền Long An
- Third place: Khonkaen Star
- Fourth place: F2 Logistics Philippines

The 2018 Women's Volleyball Kor Royal Cup was the latest edition of the Women's Volleyball Kor Royal Cup, the tournament patronized by Princess Maha Chakri Sirindhorn, The Princess Royal of Thailand for women's senior volleyball clubs, also known as 2018 Sealect Tuna Women's Senior Volleyball Kor Royal Cup Thailand Championship due to the sponsorship deal with Sealect Tuna. A total of 6 teams will compete in the tournament.

== Teams ==
Team	Qualified as
PEA Sisaket	Hosts
Khonkaen Star	Thailand League member
Australia	Wild Card
Fiji	Wild Card
F2 Logistics Philippines	Wild Card
(Vietnam) VTV Bình Điền Long An	Wild Card

== Pools composition ==
Pool A	Pool B
PEA Sisaket; (Vietnam) VTV Bình Điền Long An; Fiji	Khonkaen Star; F2 Logistics Philippines; Australia

== Preliminary round ==
All times are Indochina Time (UTC+07:00).

=== Pool standing procedure ===
1. Number of matches won
2. Match points
3. Sets ratio
4. Points ratio
5. If the tie continues as per the point ratio between two teams, the priority will be given to the team which won the last match between them. When the tie in points ratio is between three or more teams, a new classification of these teams in the terms of points 1, 2 and 3 will be made taking into consideration only the matches in which they were opposed to each other.

Match won 3–0 or 3–1: 3 match points for the winner, 0 match points for the loser
Match won 3–2: 2 match points for the winner, 1 match point for the loser

=== Pool A ===
Pos	Team	Pld	W	L	Pts	SW	SL	SR	SPW	SPL	SPR	Qualification
1	PEA Sisaket (H)	2	2	0	6	6	0	MAX	150	73	2.055	Semi-finals
2	(Vietnam) VTV Bình Điền Long An	2	1	1	3	3	3	1.000	118	110	1.073	Semi-finals
3	Fiji	2	0	2	0	0	6	0.000	65	150	0.433	Fifth place play-off

Rules for classification: Pool standing procedure
(H) Host

Date	Time		Score		Set 1	Set 2	Set 3	Set 4	Set 5	Total	Report
27 Jun	18:00	PEA Sisaket	3–0	(Vietnam) VTV Bình Điền Long An	25–16	25–11	25–16			75–43	
28 Jun	18:00	PEA Sisaket	3–0	Fiji	25–10	25–9	25–11			75–30	
29 Jun	16:00	VTV Bình Điền Long An (Vietnam)	3–0	Fiji	25–12	25–13	25–10			75–35	

=== Pool B ===
Pos	Team	Pld	W	L	Pts	SW	SL	SR	SPW	SPL	SPR	Qualification
1	Khonkaen Star	2	2	0	6	6	1	6.000	172	130	1.323	Semi-finals
2	F2 Logistics Philippines	2	1	1	3	4	4	1.000	176	180	0.978	Semi-finals
3	Australia	2	0	2	0	1	6	0.167	135	173	0.780	Fifth place play-off

Rules for classification: Pool standing procedure

Date	Time		Score		Set 1	Set 2	Set 3	Set 4	Set 5	Total	Report
27 Jun	16:00	Khonkaen Star	3–1	F2 Logistics Philippines	22–25	25–15	25–23	25–15		97–78	
28 Jun	16:00	Khonkaen Star	3–0	Australia	25–18	25–18	25–16			75–52	
29 Jun	18:00	F2 Logistics Philippines	3–1	Australia	25–19	23–25	25–23	25–16		98–83	

== Final round ==
All times are Indochina Time (UTC+07:00).

Semi-finals
30 June
PEA Sisaket	3
F2 Logistics Philippines	0
30 June
(Vietnam) VTV Bình Điền Long An	3
Khonkaen Star	1

Final
1 July
PEA Sisaket	3
(Vietnam) VTV Bình Điền Long An	0
Third place play-off
1 July
F2 Logistics Philippines	2
Khonkaen Star	3

Fifth place play-off
1 July
Fiji	0
Australia	3

=== Semi-finals ===
Date	Time		Score		Set 1	Set 2	Set 3	Set 4	Set 5	Total	Report
30 Jun	14:00	PEA Sisaket	3–0	F2 Logistics Philippines	25–18	25–13	25–18			75–49	
30 Jun	16:00	VTV Bình Điền Long An (Vietnam)	3–1	Khonkaen Star	25–21	22–25	25–17	25–19		97–82	

=== Fifth place play-off ===
Date	Time		Score		Set 1	Set 2	Set 3	Set 4	Set 5	Total	Report
1 Jul	10:00	Fiji	0–3	Australia	15–25	18–25	20–25			53–75	

=== Third place play-off ===
Date	Time		Score		Set 1	Set 2	Set 3	Set 4	Set 5	Total	Report
1 Jul	12:00	F2 Logistics Philippines	2–3	Khonkaen Star	25–12	25–22	19–25	16–25	17–19	102–103	

=== Final ===
Date	Time		Score		Set 1	Set 2	Set 3	Set 4	Set 5	Total	Report
1 Jul	18:00	PEA Sisaket	3–0	(Vietnam) VTV Bình Điền Long An	25–14	25–17	25–22			75–53	

== Final standings ==
อันดับ	ทีม
1st place, gold medalist(s)	PEA Sisaket
2nd place, silver medalist(s)	(Vietnam) VTV Bình Điền Long An
3rd place, bronze medalist(s)	Khonkaen Star
4	F2 Logistics Philippines
5	Australia
6	Fiji

2018 Women's Volleyball Kor Royal Cup

PEA Sisaket
