= 2010 Asian Women's Club Volleyball Championship =

Women's volleyball tournament

2010 Asian Club Championship

Tournament details
- Host country: Indonesia
- Dates: 26 June – 4 July
- Teams: 10
- Venue: 1 (in 1 host city)

Final positions
- Champions: (Thailand) Federbrau (2nd title)

Tournament awards
- MVP: (Thailand) Nootsara Tomkom

The 2010 Asian Women's Club Volleyball Championship was the 11th edition of the AVC Club Championships. The tournament was held in Tri Dharma Hall, Gresik, Surabaya, Indonesia.

== Pools composition ==
The teams are seeded based on their final ranking at the 2009 Asian Women's Club Volleyball Championship.

Pool A	Pool B
Indonesia (Host); Japan (3rd); Chinese Taipei; North Korea; Iran	Thailand (1st); China (2nd); South Korea; Kazakhstan; Vietnam

== Preliminary round ==
=== Pool A ===
Pos	Team	Pld	W	L	Pts	SW	SL	SR	SPW	SPL	SPR	Qualification
1	(Japan) JT Marvelous	4	4	0	8	12	0	MAX	300	185	1.622	Quarterfinals
2	(North Korea) Sobaeksu	4	3	1	7	9	5	1.800	304	244	1.246	Quarterfinals
3	Chinese Taipei	4	2	2	6	8	6	1.333	306	277	1.105	Quarterfinals
4	(Iran) Zob Ahan Isfahan	4	1	3	5	3	9	0.333	210	279	0.753	Quarterfinals
5	(Indonesia) Petrokimia Gresik	4	0	4	4	0	12	0.000	165	300	0.550	

Date	Time		Score		Set 1	Set 2	Set 3	Set 4	Set 5	Total	Report
26 Jun	14:30	Zob Ahan Isfahan (Iran)	3–0	(Indonesia) Petrokimia Gresik	25–22	25–20	25–12			75–54	Report
26 Jun	20:30	Chinese Taipei	2–3	(North Korea) Sobaeksu	16–25	25–21	25–17	23–25	7–15	96–103	Report
27 Jun	16:30	JT Marvelous (Japan)	3–0	(North Korea) Sobaeksu	25–23	25–14	25–14			75–51	Report
27 Jun	18:30	Zob Ahan Isfahan (Iran)	0–3	Chinese Taipei	23–25	11–25	13–25			47–75	Report
28 Jun	14:30	JT Marvelous (Japan)	3–0	(Iran) Zob Ahan Isfahan	25–15	25–20	25–16			75–51	Report
28 Jun	20:30	Petrokimia Gresik (Indonesia)	0–3	Chinese Taipei	18–25	18–25	16–25			52–75	Report
29 Jun	16:30	Sobaeksu (North Korea)	3–0	(Iran) Zob Ahan Isfahan	25–11	25–12	25–14			75–37	Report
29 Jun	18:30	Petrokimia Gresik (Indonesia)	0–3	(Japan) JT Marvelous	5–25	10–25	8–25			23–75	Report
30 Jun	14:30	Chinese Taipei	0–3	(Japan) JT Marvelous	22–25	20–25	18–25			60–75	Report
30 Jun	18:30	Sobaeksu (North Korea)	3–0	(Indonesia) Petrokimia Gresik	25–10	25–12	25–14			75–36	Report

=== Pool B ===
Pos	Team	Pld	W	L	Pts	SW	SL	SR	SPW	SPL	SPR	Qualification
1	(Thailand) Federbrau	4	4	0	8	12	2	6.000	338	253	1.336	Quarterfinals
2	(Kazakhstan) Zhetyssu Almaty	4	3	1	7	9	4	2.250	300	282	1.064	Quarterfinals
3	(China) Tianjin Bridgestone	4	2	2	6	8	6	1.333	316	266	1.188	Quarterfinals
4	(Vietnam) VTV Bình Điền Long An	4	1	3	5	3	11	0.273	241	329	0.733	Quarterfinals
5	(South Korea) Daejeon KT&G Ariels	4	0	4	4	3	12	0.250	280	345	0.812	

Date	Time		Score		Set 1	Set 2	Set 3	Set 4	Set 5	Total	Report
26 Jun	16:30	Federbrau (Thailand)	3–1	(South Korea) Daejeon KT&G Ariels	25–12	20–25	25–23	25–17		95–77	Report
26 Jun	18:30	Tianjin Bridgestone (China)	1–3	(Kazakhstan) Zhetyssu Almaty	16–25	23–25	25–20	22–25		86–95	Report
27 Jun	14:30	VTV Bình Điền Long An (Vietnam)	0–3	(Kazakhstan) Zhetyssu Almaty	16–25	21–25	24–26			61–76	Report
27 Jun	20:30	Federbrau (Thailand)	3–1	(China) Tianjin Bridgestone	25–13	25–20	18–25	25–22		93–80	Report
28 Jun	16:30	Daejeon KT&G Ariels (South Korea)	0–3	(China) Tianjin Bridgestone	14–25	13–25	13–25			40–75	Report
28 Jun	18:30	VTV Bình Điền Long An (Vietnam)	0–3	(Thailand) Federbrau	11–25	19–25	13–25			43–75	Report
29 Jun	14:30	Daejeon KT&G Ariels (South Korea)	2–3	(Vietnam) VTV Bình Điền Long An	19–25	25–16	23–25	25–18	11–15	103–99	Report
29 Jun	20:30	Zhetyssu Almaty (Kazakhstan)	0–3	(Thailand) Federbrau	15–25	18–25	20–25			53–75	Report
30 Jun	16:30	Tianjin Bridgestone (China)	3–0	(Vietnam) VTV Bình Điền Long An	25–9	25–20	25–9			75–38	Report
30 Jun	20:30	Zhetyssu Almaty (Kazakhstan)	3–0	(South Korea) Daejeon KT&G Ariels	26–24	25–23	25–13			76–60	Report

== Classification 9th–10th ==
Date	Time		Score		Set 1	Set 2	Set 3	Set 4	Set 5	Total	Report
02 Jul	09:30	Petrokimia Gresik (Indonesia)	0–3	(South Korea) Daejeon KT&G Ariels	14–25	20–25	15–25			49–75	Report

== Final round ==
Quarterfinals
2 July – Gresik
(Japan) JT Marvelous	3
(Vietnam) Bình Điền Long An	0
2 July – Gresik
(Kazakhstan) Zhetyssu	3
Chinese Taipei	1
2 July – Gresik
(Thailand) Federbrau	3
(Iran) Zob Ahan	0
2 July – Gresik
(North Korea) Sobaeksu	2
(China) Tianjin	3

Semifinals
3 July – Gresik
(Japan) JT Marvelous	1
(Kazakhstan) Zhetyssu	3
3 July – Gresik
(Thailand) Federbrau	3
(China) Tianjin	0

Final
4 July – Gresik
(Kazakhstan) Zhetyssu	1
(Thailand) Federbrau	3
3rd place
4 July – Gresik
(Japan) JT Marvelous	3
(China) Tianjin	2

5th–8th places
3 July – Gresik
(Vietnam) Bình Điền Long An	0
Chinese Taipei	3
3 July – Gresik
(Iran) Zob Ahan	0
(North Korea) Sobaeksu	3

5th place
4 July – Gresik
Chinese Taipei	1
(North Korea) Sobaeksu	3
7th place
4 July – Gresik
(Vietnam) Bình Điền Long An	3
(Iran) Zob Ahan	1

=== Quarterfinals ===
Date	Time		Score		Set 1	Set 2	Set 3	Set 4	Set 5	Total	Report
02 Jul	14:30	JT Marvelous (Japan)	3–0	(Vietnam) VTV Bình Điền Long An	25–12	25–20	25–7			75–39	Report
02 Jul	16:30	Federbrau (Thailand)	3–0	(Iran) Zob Ahan Isfahan	25–12	25–20	25–19			75–51	Report
02 Jul	18:30	Sobaeksu (North Korea)	2–3	(China) Tianjin Bridgestone	25–20	24–26	23–25	25–20	11–15	108–106	Report
02 Jul	20:30	Zhetyssu Almaty (Kazakhstan)	3–1	Chinese Taipei	25–12	25–20	20–25	25–12		95–69	Report

=== 5th–8th semifinals ===
Date	Time		Score		Set 1	Set 2	Set 3	Set 4	Set 5	Total	Report
03 Jul	14:30	VTV Bình Điền Long An (Vietnam)	0–3	Chinese Taipei	18–25	7–25	18–25			43–75	Report
03 Jul	16:30	Zob Ahan Isfahan (Iran)	0–3	(North Korea) Sobaeksu	15–25	14–25	15–25			44–75	Report

=== Semifinals ===
Date	Time		Score		Set 1	Set 2	Set 3	Set 4	Set 5	Total	Report
03 Jul	18:30	JT Marvelous (Japan)	1–3	(Kazakhstan) Zhetyssu Almaty	25–19	28–30	23–25	21–25		97–99	Report
03 Jul	20:30	Federbrau (Thailand)	3–0	(China) Tianjin Bridgestone	25–16	25–20	25–15			75–51	Report

=== 7th place ===
Date	Time		Score		Set 1	Set 2	Set 3	Set 4	Set 5	Total	Report
04 Jul	14:30	VTV Bình Điền Long An (Vietnam)	3–1	(Iran) Zob Ahan Isfahan	22–25	25–22	25–16	25–18		97–81	Report

=== 5th place ===
Date	Time		Score		Set 1	Set 2	Set 3	Set 4	Set 5	Total	Report
04 Jul	16:30	Chinese Taipei	1–3	(North Korea) Sobaeksu	15–25	23–25	25–20	20–25		83–95	Report

=== 3rd place ===
Date	Time		Score		Set 1	Set 2	Set 3	Set 4	Set 5	Total	Report
04 Jul	18:30	JT Marvelous (Japan)	3–2	(China) Tianjin Bridgestone	25–23	20–25	26–24	14–25	15–11	100–108	

=== Final ===
Date	Time		Score		Set 1	Set 2	Set 3	Set 4	Set 5	Total	Report
04 Jul	20:30	Zhetyssu Almaty (Kazakhstan)	1–3	(Thailand) Federbrau	25–21	23–25	11–25	24–26		83–97	Report

== Final standing ==
Rank	Team
1st place, gold medalist(s)	(Thailand) Federbrau
2nd place, silver medalist(s)	(Kazakhstan) Zhetyssu Almaty
3rd place, bronze medalist(s)	(Japan) JT Marvelous
4	(China) Tianjin Bridgestone
5	(North Korea) Sobaeksu
6	Chinese Taipei
7	(Vietnam) VTV Bình Điền Long An
8	(Iran) Zob Ahan Isfahan
9	(South Korea) Daejeon KT&G Ariels
10	(Indonesia) Petrokimia Gresik

Qualified for the 2010 Club World Championship

== Awards ==
- MVP: (Thailand) Nootsara Tomkom (Federbrau)
- Best scorer: (Thailand) Onuma Sittirak (Federbrau)
- Best spiker: (Thailand) Onuma Sittirak (Federbrau)
- Best blocker: (Kazakhstan) Olga Drobyshevskaya (Zhetyssu)
- Best server: (Kazakhstan) Korinna Ishimtseva (Zhetyssu)
- Best setter: (Japan) Yuki Kawai (JT Marvelous)
- Best libero: (Japan) Kotoe Inoue (JT Marvelous)
