= Kinh Bắc Bắc Ninh =

Vietnamese women's volleyball team

- Founded: 2017
- League: Volleyball Vietnam League

Kinh Bắc Bắc Ninh or IMP Bắc Ninh is a Vietnamese women's volleyball team based in Bắc Ninh which plays in the Volleyball Vietnam League.

== History ==
Kinh Bắc Bắc Ninh was established on 3 November 2017. In 2018, it won the Vietnam's National Championship. During the 2019 and 2020 seasons, the team finished third in the Volleyball Vietnam League.

The took part at the 2023 Invitational Conference of the Premier Volleyball League in the Philippines as a guest team. Granted a bye to the final phase, they did not win any games.

== Honours ==
- Vietnam League
  - 3rd place: 2019, 2020
