= Zhang Xiaoya =

Chinese volleyball player (born 1992)

Personal information
- Nationality: Chinese
- Born: 4 October 1992 (age 34)
- Height: 189 cm (74 in)
- Weight: 60 kg (132 lb)
- Spike: 310 cm (122 in)
- Block: 300 cm (118 in)

Volleyball information
- Current club: Supreme Chonburi
- Number: 23

Career
- Years: Team
- 2009 - Present: Sichuan
- 2019: Supreme Chonburi

National team
- Years: Team
- 2014 - 2016: China
Honours
World Cup
Gold medal – first place	2015 Japan	Team
AVC Cup
Gold medal – first place	2016 Vĩnh Phúc	Team
Gold medal – first place	2014 Shenzhen	Team

Zhang Xiaoya (born 4 October 1992) is a Chinese female volleyball player. She is part of the China women's national volleyball team. On club level she played for Sichuan in 2015.

== Clubs ==
- (China) Sichuan (2009–Present)
- (Thailand) Supreme Chonburi (2019)

== Awards ==
=== Individuals ===
- 2016 Montreux Volley Masters "Best Middle Blocker"
- 2019 Thai–Denmark Super League "Best Middle Blocker"

=== Club ===
- 2019 Thai–Denmark Super League - Champion, with Supreme Chonburi
- 2019-2020 Volleyball Thailand League - Champion, with Supreme Chonburi

== National team ==
- 2014 Asian Cup — Champion
- 2014 Asian Games — Silver Medal
- 2015 World Cup — Champion
- 2016 Montreux Volley Masters — Champion
- 2016 World Grand Prix — 5th place
- 2016 Asian Cup — Champion

Awards
Preceded by (Turkey) Büşra Cansu and (Netherlands) Yvon Belien	Best Middle Blocker of Montreux Volley Masters; 2016 (with (Thailand) Hattaya Bamrungsuk)	Succeeded by (Brazil) Ana Carolina da Silva and (Germany) Marie Schölzel
