= Âu Hồng Nhung =

Vietnamese volleyball player (born 1993)

Personal information
- Full name: Âu Hồng Nhung
- Born: May 27, 1993 (age 33) Lạng Sơn, Vietnam
- Height: 1.72 m (5 ft 8 in)
- Spike: 285 cm (9 ft 4 in)
- Block: 285 cm (9 ft 4 in)

Volleyball information
- Position: Wing Spiker, Libero
- Current club: Thông tin Liên Việt Post Bank
- Number: 2

National team
- Years: Team
- 2013 - 2015: Vietnam

Âu Hồng Nhung (born May 27, 1993) is a member of the Vietnam women's national volleyball team.
