= Sichuan women's volleyball team =

Chinese professional volleyball team

Sichuan Women’s Volleyball Club
- Full name: Shanghai Women's Volleyball Club 四川女子排球俱乐部
- Short name: 四川女排
- Ground: Shuangliu Sports Center, Chengdu, China (Capacity: 3400)
- League: Chinese Volleyball League
- 2017-18: 12th

Sichuan Women's Volleyball Club is a professional women's volleyball team which compete in Chinese Volleyball League. The volleyball club is located in the capital of the Sichuan district: Chengdu, China.

== Team member 2013-2014 ==
Number	Player	Position	Height (m)	Birth date
1	(China) Huang He (黄贺)	Setter	1.78	1994-03-18
2	(China) Su Weiping (苏围萍)	Middle blocker	1.78	1996-12-09
3	(China) Zhao Yanni (赵燕妮)	Spiker	1.87	1988-10-23
6	(China) Wang Chen (c) (王晨)	Setter	1.80	1990-10-29
7	(China) Yin Jie (尹洁)	Libero	1.80	1990-05-17
8	(China) Zhang Xiaoya (张晓雅)	Middle blocker	1.90	1992-10-04
9	(China) Ye Qi (叶绮)	Middle blocker	1.86	1993-02-14
10	(China) Yang Dongmei (杨冬梅)	Spiker	1.80	1990-11-17
11	(China) Zhu Yuxiao (朱昱晓)	Spiker	1.84	1994-12-07
12	(China) Li Mengting (李梦婷)	Outside hitter	1.81	1994-09-29
14	(China) Yang Menglu (杨梦露)	Middle blocker	1.86	1995-02-11
15	(China) Liu Meiling (刘美玲)	Setter	1.82	1991-07-29
16	(China) Leng Wei (冷薇)	Opposite	1.80	1985-08-20
18	(China) Zan Yulu (昝玉璐)	Libero	1.70	1990-04-04

== Former players ==
- (China) Chen Jing
- (China) Zhao Jing
