= Liu Meiling =

Chinese rower

Liu Meiling is a Chinese lightweight rower.

At the 1995 World Rowing Championships, she came ninth in the lightweight double sculls. At the 1996 World Rowing Championships, she won gold in the lightweight four.
