= LP Bank Ninh Bình Women's Volleyball Club =

Volleyball club in Vietnam

LP Bank Ninh Bình
- Full name: LP Bank Ninh Bình Women's Volleyball Club
- Short name: Ninh Bình
- Founded: 2021
- League: Vietnam League
- 2025: Runners-up

LP Bank Ninh Bình Women's Volleyball Club is a Vietnamese professional volleyball club based in Ninh Bình, Vietnam. It competes in the Volleyball Vietnam League.

The club was established in 2021 as Ninh Bình Doveco. It won its first league title in 2023 season of the Vietnam League.

== Honours ==
=== International competitions ===
AVC Club Volleyball Championship

- Runners-up (1): 2024

FIVB Volleyball Women's Club World Championship

- 2024: 8th place

=== Domestic competitions ===
Vietnam League

- Winners (1): 2023
- Runners-up (1): 2025
- 3rd place (1): 2024

VTV9 - Binh Dien International Women's Volleyball Cup

- Runners-up (1): 2024
