= Fujian Xi Meng Bao =

Chinese women's volleyball team

Fujian Anxi Tiekuanyin Women's Volleyball Club 福建安溪鐵觀音女子排球俱樂部
- Short name: Fujian Anxi Tiekuanyin Women's Volleyball 福建女排
- Founded: 1958
- Ground: Fuqing City Stadium (Capacity: 4500)
- Manager: Hu Jin
- League: Chinese Volleyball League
- 2017-18: 10th ▼1

Fujian Anxi Tiekuanyin Women's Volleyball Club is a professional volleyball team based in Xiamen, Fujian that plays in the Chinese Volleyball League. The team now is sponsored by Anxi Tiekuanyin Group.

== CVL results ==
Season	Final ranking
2018-2019	8th
2017-2018	10th
2016-2017	9th
2015-2016	8th
2014-2015	6th
2013-2014	9th
2012-2013	11th
2011-2012	9th
2010-2011	-
2009-2010	-
2008-2009	-
2007-2008	13th
2006-2007	11th
2005-2006	9th
2004-2005	11th
2003-2004	12th
2002-2003	8th
2001-2002	10th
2000-2001	6th
1999-2000	11th
1998-1999	-
1997-1998	8th
1996-1997	6th

== Team roster 2016-2017 ==
Number	Player	Position	Height (m)	Birth date
1	(China) Zhang Yuting	Spiker	1.85	07/07/1994
2	(China) Zhang Jing	Spiker	1.83	26/01/1996
3	(China) Mi Yang (c)	Setter	1.80	24/01/1989
4	(China) Lin Li	Libero	1.71	05/07/1992
5	(China) Zhuang Kaiye	Setter	1.71	30/03/2001
6	(China) Zheng Yanling	Middle Blocker	1.81	05/05/1992
7	(China) Xu Yunli	Middle Blocker	1.95	02/08/1987
8	(China) Liu Yang	Opposite	1.84	6/05/1991
9	(China) Lin Lin	Spiker	1.84	27/08/1996
10	(China) Chen Yaqing	Setter	1.73	19/05/1985
11	(China) Chen Yafang	Middle Blocker	1.85	01/02/1992
12	(China) Huang Rizhen	Spiker	1.79	10/02/1993
14	(China) Zheng Si	Middle Blocker	1.84	26/04/1994
15	(China) Tong Yuting	Spiker	1.83	28/10/1998
16	(China) Zheng Yixin	Middle Blocker	1.87	06/05/1995
17	(China) Yao Ziqi	Spiker	1.75	25/01/2000
18	(China) Luo Hui	Opposite	1.82	18/03/1994

== Former players ==
- (Netherlands) Manon Flier
- (China) Li Yan
- (Thailand) Patcharee Sangmuang
- (Thailand) Malika Kanthong
- (Thailand) Pleumjit Thinkaow
- (Thailand) Wilavan Apinyapong
- (United States) Nicole Fawcett
