= Volleyball Vietnam League =

Vietnam's top volleyball league for women and men

- Most recent season or competition: 2026 Volleyball Vietnam League
- Formerly: Vietnamese: Giải vô địch bóng chuyền các đội mạnh Toàn quốc
- Sport: Volleyball
- Founded: 2004
- First season: 2004
- No. of teams: M: 8 W: 8
- Country: Vietnam
- Confederation: AVC
- Most recent champions: M: Biên Phòng (5th title); W: Bộ Tư lệnh Thông tin (13th title)
- Most titles: M: Ninh Bình; Biên Phòng (5 titles each); W: Bộ Tư lệnh Thông tin (13 titles)
- Broadcasters: Onme and VTVCab
- Sponsors: PV Gas; Mikasa Sports
- Level on pyramid: 1
- Relegation to: Volleyball Vietnam A Championship
- Domestic cup: Hung Vuong Volleyball Cup
- International cups: Women's and Men's AVC Champions Leagues
- Website: Official website

The Volleyball Vietnam League (Vietnamese: Giải bóng chuyền vô địch Quốc gia Việt Nam) is a top-level volleyball league for women and men in Vietnam. It is organized by the Volleyball Federation of Vietnam. The champion team qualifies for the Women's or Men's AVC Champions League.

== Men ==
=== 2026 clubs ===
- Biên Phòng MB
- Thể Công Tân Cảng
- Công an TP. Hồ Chí Minh
- LP Bank Ninh Bình
- Hà Nội
- Đà Nẵng
- Sanest Khánh Hòa
- TP. Hồ Chí Minh

=== Titles by season ===
Season	Champions	Score	Runners-up	Third place	Score	Fourth place
2004	Bưu điện Hà Nội	3–1	Thể Công	Công an TP. Hồ Chí Minh	3–0	Bưu điện Trà Vinh
2005	Thể Công	3–2	Bưu điện Hà Nội	Quân đoàn 4	3–1	Tràng An Ninh Bình
2006	Tràng An Ninh Bình	3–2	Thể Công	Quân đoàn 4	3–1	Dệt Thành Công
2007	Thể Công	3–1	Hoàng Long Long An	Tràng An Ninh Bình	3–?	Bến Tre
2008	Sanest Khánh Hòa	3–1	Thể Công	Hoàng Long Long An	3–0	Quân đoàn 4
2009	Sao Vàng Biên Phòng	3–0	Tràng An Ninh Bình	Hoàng Long Long An	3–1	Thể Công
2010	Tràng An Ninh Bình	3–1	Hoàng Long Long An	Sao Vàng Biên Phòng	3–0	Thể Công
2011	Sacombank Biên Phòng	3–0	Sanest Khánh Hòa	Thể Công	3–?	Hoàng Long Long An
2012	Tràng An Ninh Bình	3–2	Đức Long Gia Lai	Thể Công	3–1	Sanest Khánh Hòa
2013	Đức Long Gia Lai	3–1	Thể Công	Maseco TP. Hồ Chí Minh	3–2	Tràng An Ninh Bình
2014	Thể Công	3–1	Đức Long Gia Lai	Sanest Khánh Hòa	3–1	Biên Phòng
2015	Maseco TP. Hồ Chí Minh	3–2	Sanest Khánh Hòa	XSKT Vĩnh Long	3–0	Quân đoàn 4
2016	Thể Công	3–1	Sanest Khánh Hòa	Biên Phòng	3–?	Maseco TP. Hồ Chí Minh
2017	Sanest Khánh Hòa	3–2	Thể Công	Tràng An Ninh Bình	3–2	Quân đoàn 4
2018	TP. Hồ Chí Minh	3–0	Thể Công	Tràng An Ninh Bình	3–0	Biên Phòng
2019	TP. Hồ Chí Minh	3–0	Sanest Khánh Hòa	Tràng An Ninh Bình	3–0	VLXD Bình Dương
2020	Sanest Khánh Hòa	3–1	TP. Hồ Chí Minh	Tràng An Ninh Bình	3–1	Biên Phòng
2021	Tràng An Ninh Bình	3–0	Thể Công	Sanest Khánh Hòa	3–1	Hà Tĩnh
2022	Tràng An Ninh Bình	3–1	Sanest Khánh Hòa	Hà Nội	3–1	VLXD Bình Dương
2023	Sanest Khánh Hòa	3–0	Biên Phòng	Thể Công Tân Cảng	3–0	Hà Tĩnh
2024	Biên Phòng	3–1	Sanest Khánh Hòa	Thể Công Tân Cảng	3–0	LP Bank Ninh Bình
2025	Biên Phòng MB	3–2	Thể Công Tân Cảng	Công an TP. Hồ Chí Minh	3–1	LP Bank Ninh Bình
2026	Biên Phòng MB	3–2	Công an TP. Hồ Chí Minh	Thể Công Tân Cảng	3–2	LP Bank Ninh Bình

=== Titles by club ===
Club	Champions	Runners-Up	Third Place
Ninh Bình	5	1	5
Biên Phòng	5	1	2
Thể Công	4	8	5
Sanest Khánh Hòa	4	6	2
TP. Hồ Chí Minh	3	1	1
Đức Long Gia Lai	1	2	0
Hà Nội	1	1	1
Tây Ninh	0	2	2
Công an TP. Hồ Chí Minh	0	1	2
Quân đoàn 4	0	0	2
XSKT Vĩnh Long	0	0	1

== Women ==
=== 2026 clubs ===
- VTV Bình Điền Long An
- LP Bank Ninh Bình
- Binh chủng Thông tin - BĐ19
- Ngân hàng Công Thương
- Hóa chất Đức Giang Lào Cai
- Xi măng Long Sơn Thanh Hóa
- Geleximco Hưng Yên
- Hà Nội Tasco Auto

=== Titles by season ===
Season	Champions	Score	Runners-up	Third place	Score	Fourth place
2004	Bộ Tư lệnh Thông tin	3–1	Vital Thái Bình	Bưu Điện Hà Nội	3–1	Giấy Bãi Bằng
2005	Bộ Tư lệnh Thông tin	3–0	Tuần Châu Quảng Ninh	Vital Thái Bình	3–0	VTV Bình Điền Long An
2006	Bộ Tư lệnh Thông tin	3–2	Vital Thái Bình	Ngân hàng Công Thương	3–2	VTV Bình Điền Long An
2007	Vital Petechim Thái Bình	3–2	VTV Bình Điền Long An	Ngân hàng Công Thương	3–?	Giấy Bãi Bằng
2008	Bộ Tư lệnh Thông tin Trust Bank	3–0	Vital Petechim Thái Bình	VTV Bình Điền Long An	3–?	Ngân hàng Công Thương
2009	VTV Bình Điền Long An	3–1	Bộ Tư lệnh Thông tin Trust Bank	PV Oil Thái Bình	3–0	Vietsovpetro
2010	Thông tin Liên Việt Bank	3–1	Vietsovpetro	VTV Bình Điền Long An	3–1	PV Oil Thái Bình
2011	VTV Bình Điền Long An	3–2	Thông tin LienVietPostBank	Ngân hàng Công Thương	3–0	PV Oil Thái Bình
2012	Thông tin LienVietPostBank	3–1	Ngân hàng Công Thương	VTV Bình Điền Long An	3–1	PVD Thái Bình
2013	Thông tin LienVietPostBank	3–0	Ngân hàng Công Thương	Vietsovpetro	3–0	Tiến Nông Thanh Hóa
2014	Thông tin LienVietPostBank	3–2	VTV Bình Điền Long An	Ngân hàng Công Thương	3–0	Tiến Nông Thanh Hóa
2015	Thông tin LienVietPostBank	3–0	Ngân hàng Công Thương	VTV Bình Điền Long An	3–0	Tiến Nông Thanh Hóa
2016	Ngân hàng Công Thương	3–2	Thông tin LienVietPostBank	VTV Bình Điền Long An	3–0	Tiến Nông Thanh Hóa
2017	VTV Bình Điền Long An	3–0	Thông tin LienVietPostBank	Ngân hàng Công Thương	3–0	PVD Thái Bình
2018	VTV Bình Điền Long An	3–2	Thông tin LienVietPostBank	Ngân hàng Công Thương	3–0	Tiến Nông Thanh Hóa
2019	Thông tin LienVietPostBank	3–1	Ngân hàng Công Thương	Kinh Bắc Bắc Ninh	3–1	VTV Bình Điền Long An
2020	Thông tin LienVietPostBank	3–1	Hóa chất Đức Giang Hà Nội	Kinh Bắc Bắc Ninh	3–1	Ngân hàng Công Thương
2021	Bộ Tư lệnh Thông tin - FLC	3–1	Hóa chất Đức Giang Hà Nội	Than Quảng Ninh	3–2	Ninh Bình Doveco
2022	Geleximco Thái Bình	3–0	Hóa chất Đức Giang Hà Nội	VTV Bình Điền Long An	3–0	Ninh Bình Doveco
2023	Ninh Bình LP Bank	3–1	Hóa chất Đức Giang Tia Sáng	VTV Bình Điền Long An	3–1	Binh chủng Thông tin - TTBP
2024	VTV Bình Điền Long An	3–1	Hóa chất Đức Giang Lào Cai	LP Bank Ninh Bình	3–1	Xi măng Long Sơn Thanh Hóa
2025	VTV Bình Điền Long An	3–2	LP Bank Ninh Bình	Binh chủng Thông tin - BĐ19	3–0	Ngân hàng Công Thương
2026	Binh chủng Thông tin - BĐ19	3–1	Hà Nội Tasco Auto	VTV Bình Điền Long An	3–0	Hóa chất Đức Giang Lào Cai

=== Titles by club ===
Club	Champions	Runners-Up	Third Place
Bộ Tư lệnh Thông tin	13	5	1
VTV Bình Điền Long An	6	2	8
Hưng Yên	2	3	2
Ngân hàng Công Thương	1	4	6
Ninh Bình	1	1	1
Hóa chất Đức Giang	0	5	1
Vietsovpetro	0	1	1
Quảng Ninh	0	1	1
Hà Nội	0	1	0
Kinh Bắc Bắc Ninh	0	0	2
