= Ngân hàng Công Thương =

Vietnamese women's volleyball club

Ngân Hàng Công Thương
- Full name: Ngân Hàng Công Thương Việt Nam
- Nickname: Vietinbank VC
- Founded: 2003; 23 years ago
- Head coach: Nguyễn Tuấn Kiệt
- Captain: Hoàng Thị Phương Anh
- League: Vietnam Women's Volleyball League
- 2025: 4th Place

Uniforms
Home	Away

Ngân Hàng Công Thương or Vietinbank VC is a Vietnamese women's volleyball club. The club was founded in 2003, with the main sponsor is Vietinbank.

== Honours ==
=== Domestic competitions ===
==== Vietnam League ====
- Champion (1): 2016
- Runner-up (4): 2012, 2013, 2015, 2019
- 3rd place (6): 2006, 2007, 2011, 2014, 2017, 2018

==== Hùng Vương Cup ====
- Champion (4): 2006, 2012, 2016, 2017
- Runner-up (3): 2005, 2013, 2019
- 3rd place (4): 2007, 2011, 2015, 2018

==== Vietnam U-23 Volleyball Championship ====
- Champion (2): 2020, 2022
- 3rd place (1): 2023

==== VTV9 - Bình Điền International Cup ====
- Champion (2): 2006, 2016
- Runner-up (1): 2007
- 3rd place (3): 2008, 2013, 2014

==== Liên Việt Post Bank Cup ====
- 3rd place (3): 2011, 2012, 2017

=== International competitions ===
==== Asian Club Championship ====
- (Kazakhstan) 2017 — 7th place

== Current squad ==
- Head coach: (Vietnam) Phạm Thị Kim Huệ
- Assistant coaches:
  - (Vietnam) Hà Thu Dậu
  - (Vietnam) Nguyễn Duy Quang

#	Pos	Name	Date of Birth	Height	Weight	Spike	Block
4	OH	Bùi Thị Khánh Huyền	November 5, 2002 (age 23)	1.74 m (5 ft 9 in)	58 kg (128 lb)	290 cm (110 in)	288 cm (113 in)
23	MB	Đinh Thị Trà Giang	May 9, 1992 (age 34)	1.82 m (6 ft 0 in)	64 kg (141 lb)	305 cm (120 in)	297 cm (117 in)
9	OH	Hoàng Minh Tâm	February 10, 1991 (age 35)	1.73 m (5 ft 8 in)	61 kg (134 lb)	303 cm (119 in)	293 cm (115 in)
10	OH	Hoàng Thị Phương Anh	January 20, 2000 (age 26)	1.75 m (5 ft 9 in)	63 kg (139 lb)	302 cm (119 in)	296 cm (117 in)
12	L	Vũ Thị Quỳnh	June 17, 2001 (age 25)	1.68 m (5 ft 6 in)	65 kg (143 lb)	287 cm (113 in)	278 cm (109 in)
15	OP	Phạm Thị Thắm	October 14, 1990 (age 35)	1.74 m (5 ft 9 in)	61 kg (134 lb)	298 cm (117 in)	294 cm (116 in)
19	L	Nguyễn Thị Ninh Anh	December 15, 2000 (age 25)	1.73 m (5 ft 8 in)	62 kg (137 lb)	290 cm (110 in)	280 cm (110 in)
20	S	Nguyễn Thu Hoài (captain)	September 16, 1998 (age 27)	1.74 m (5 ft 9 in)	60 kg (130 lb)	295 cm (116 in)	291 cm (115 in)

Notes:

- ^{OP} Opposite Spiker
- ^{OH} Outside Hitter
- ^{MB} Middle Blocker
- ^{S} Setter
- ^{L} Libero

=== Main team ===
Vietinbank VC

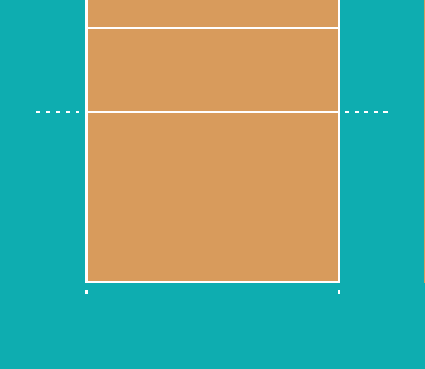

== Notable players ==
- (Vietnam) Vũ Thị Liễu
- (Vietnam) Nguyễn Kim Nguyên
- (Vietnam) Nguyễn Thanh Thúy
- (Vietnam) Hà Thu Dậu
- (Vietnam) Trần Thị Loan
- (Vietnam) Nguyễn Thị Thu Hòa
- (Vietnam) Hà Thị Hoa
- (Vietnam) Đinh Thị Huyền
- (Vietnam) Trần Thị Loan
- (Vietnam) Đinh Thị Thúy
- (Vietnam) Bùi Vũ Thanh Tuyền
- (Vietnam) Phạm Thị Kim Huệ
- (Vietnam) Võ Thị Vân Anh
- (Vietnam) Nguyễn Thị Xuân
- (Vietnam) Trần Tú Linh
- (Vietnam) Đoàn Thị Xuân
- (Vietnam) Vi Thị Như Quỳnh
- (Vietnam) Lưu Thị Huệ

== Former head coaches ==
- (Vietnam) Lê Văn Dũng
- (Vietnam) Nguyễn Tuấn Kiệt (2019–2020)
