= Bộ Tư lệnh Thông tin =

Vietnames women's volleyball club

- Full name: Signal Corps Command Women's Volleyball Club
- Short name: BTL Thông tin
- Nickname: Women soldiers (Vietnamese: Các cô gái áo lính)
- Founded: 1970; 56 years ago
- Head coach: (Vietnam) Phạm Văn Long
- Captain: (Vietnam) Hoàng Thị Kiều Trinh
- League: Vietnam League
- 2026: Champion
- Website: Club home page
- Championships: Vietnam League Champion

Uniforms
Home	Away

Signal Corps Command Women's Volleyball Club (Vietnamese: Câu lạc bộ Bóng chuyền nữ Bộ Tư lệnh Thông tin) is a Vietnamese women's volleyball club based in Hanoi. Bộ Tư lệnh Thông tin is the most successful Vietnamese professional club, with a record of twelve national titles. All members of the club are members of the People's Army of Vietnam, and some are also members of the Communist Party of Vietnam. The club was registered and established in 1970.

== Previous names ==
- Bộ Tư lệnh Thông tin (1970–2008; 2022–2023)
- Bộ Tư lệnh Thông tin Trust Bank (2008–2009)
- Thông tin Liên Việt Bank (2010)
- Thông tin LienVietPostBank (2010–2021)
- Bộ Tư lệnh Thông tin – FLC (2021–2022)
- Binh chủng Thông tin – Trường Tươi Bình Phước (2023–2024)
- Binh chủng Thông tin – Tổng Công ty Đông Bắc (2025)
- Binh chủng Thông tin – Binh đoàn 19 (2025–)

== Honours ==
=== Domestic competitions ===
Vietnam League

- Winners (13): 2004, 2005, 2006, 2008, 2010, 2012, 2013, 2014, 2015, 2019, 2020, 2021, 2026
- Runners-up (5): 2009, 2011, 2016, 2017, 2018
- 3rd place (1): 2025

Hung Vuong Volleyball Cup – Final Round 1

- Winners (4): 2009, 2010, 2011, 2013
- Runners-up (5): 2012, 2015, 2016, 2018, 2025
- 3rd place (6): 2005, 2006, 2017, 2019, 2023, 2026

Hoa Lu Volleyball Cup

- Winners (4): 2004, 2012, 2013, 2014
- Runners-up (3): 2008, 2022, 2025
- 3rd place (2): 2024, 2026

Vietnamese Super Cup

- Winners (6): 2010, 2012, 2013, 2014, 2015, 2018
- Runners-up (2): 2009, 2011
- 3rd place (2): 2016, 2017

VTV9 - Binh Dien International Women's Volleyball Cup

- Winners (3): 2011, 2013, 2014
- Runners-up (2): 2010, 2015
- 3rd place (3): 2006, 2012, 2024

LienVietPostBank Cup

- Winners (4): 2011, 2013, 2014, 2017
- Runners-up (2): 2012, 2019
- 3rd place (1): 2022

Vietnam National Games (participated as Military)

- Winners (4): 2006, 2010, 2014, 2022
- Runners-up (2): 2002, 2018

Vietnam League (defunct)

- Winners (7): 1988, 1989, 1991, 1994, 1995, 2002, 2003
- Runners-up (4): 1987, 1990, 1992, 1996
- 3rd place (3): 1993, 1997, 1999

Vietnam A1 League (defunct)

- Winners (12): 1972, 1973, 1974, 1975, 1976, 1977, 1980, 1981, 1982, 1984, 1985, 1986
- Runners-up (2): 1978, 1983

=== International competitions ===
Asian Club Championship (5 appearances)

- 2011 — 4th place
- 2013 — 5th place
- 2014 — 6th place
- 2015 — 7th place
- 2016 — 6th place

Military World Games

- 2015 — Bronze medal

=== Youth competitions ===
Vietnam Youth Volleyball Championship

- Winners (15): 1994, 1997, 1998, 2000, 2003, 2004, 2005, 2006, 2007, 2008, 2011, 2014, 2019, 2020, 2025
- Runners-up (8): 2009, 2010, 2012, 2013, 2015, 2016, 2018, 2026
- 3rd place (3): 2017, 2023, 2024

Vietnam Youth Volleyball Club Championship

- Winners (9): 2012, 2013, 2016, 2019, 2020, 2022, 2024, 2025, 2026
- Runners-up (4): 2010, 2011, 2015, 2023
- 3rd place (3): 2014, 2017, 2018

Vietnam U-23 Volleyball Championship

- Winners (3): 2023, 2025, 2026
- Runners-up (2): 2020, 2022
- 3rd place (1): 2024

== Current squad ==
- Heach Coach: (Vietnam) Phạm Văn Long
- Assistant Coach: (Vietnam) Phạm Minh Dũng, (Vietnam) Đỗ Thị Minh, (Vietnam) Âu Hồng Nhung, (Vietnam) Phạm Thị Nguyệt Anh

#	Name	Pos	Date of birth (age)	Height	Weight	Spike	Block
1	(Vietnam) Lưu Thị Ly Ly	L	20 October 1998 (age 28)	1.69 m (5 ft 7 in)	64 kg (141 lb)	280 cm (110 in)	275 cm (108 in)
4	(Vietnam) Lê Thị Hằng	L	6 February 2012 (age 14)	1.58 m (5 ft 2 in)	52 kg (115 lb)		
5	(Vietnam) Nguyễn Như Quỳnh	MB	5 August 2003 (age 23)	1.77 m (5 ft 10 in)	65 kg (143 lb)	287 cm (113 in)	282 cm (111 in)
6	(Vietnam) Ngô Thị Bích Huệ	OP	23 April 2006 (age 20)	1.78 m (5 ft 10 in)	70 kg (150 lb)	290 cm (110 in)	285 cm (112 in)
7	(United States) Erika Pritchard	OH	19 October 1999 (age 27)	1.92 m (6 ft 4 in)			
8	(Vietnam) Phan Kim Chi	OP	20 May 2007 (age 19)	1.75 m (5 ft 9 in)	70 kg (150 lb)	292 cm (115 in)	286 cm (113 in)
9	(Vietnam) Ngô Thị Sương^{INJ}	L	13 April 2004 (age 22)	1.68 m (5 ft 6 in)	58 kg (128 lb)	287 cm (113 in)	275 cm (108 in)
10	(Vietnam) Lại Thị Khánh Huyền	S	21 March 2005 (age 21)	1.71 m (5 ft 7 in)	59 kg (130 lb)	286 cm (113 in)	282 cm (111 in)
11	(Vietnam) Hoàng Thị Kiều Trinh (c)	OP	11 February 2001 (age 25)	1.74 m (5 ft 9 in)	58 kg (128 lb)	286 cm (113 in)	281 cm (111 in)
12	(United States) Temi Thomas-Ailara	OH	4 December 2000 (age 25)	1.88 m (6 ft 2 in)		313 cm (123 in)	304 cm (120 in)
14	(Vietnam) Phạm Quỳnh Hương	OH	14 February 2008 (age 18)	1.85 m (6 ft 1 in)	68 kg (150 lb)	300 cm (120 in)	289 cm (114 in)
15	(Vietnam) Nguyễn Trà Giang	MB	15 April 2007 (age 19)	1.76 m (5 ft 9 in)	66 kg (146 lb)	292 cm (115 in)	283 cm (111 in)
16	(Vietnam) Vũ Hồng Thảo Hương	MB	4 November 2006 (age 19)	1.77 m (5 ft 10 in)	65 kg (143 lb)	290 cm (110 in)	285 cm (112 in)
17	(Vietnam) Nguyễn Thị Phương	OH	20 December 1999 (age 26)	1.76 m (5 ft 9 in)	65 kg (143 lb)	295 cm (116 in)	290 cm (110 in)
19	(Vietnam) Đoàn Thị Lâm Oanh	S	6 July 1998 (age 28)	1.77 m (5 ft 10 in)	67 kg (148 lb)	289 cm (114 in)	285 cm (112 in)
21	(Vietnam) Nguyễn Huỳnh Phương Thùy	OH	2 October 2004 (age 22)	1.73 m (5 ft 8 in)	73 kg (161 lb)	285 cm (112 in)	280 cm (110 in)
28	(Vietnam) Bùi Thị Châu	MB	21 August 2008 (age 18)	1.79 m (5 ft 10 in)	65 kg (143 lb)	297 cm (117 in)	291 cm (115 in)
	(Vietnam) Phạm Thị Nguyệt Anh	OH	13 December 1998 (age 27)	1.74 m (5 ft 9 in)	60 kg (130 lb)	293 cm (115 in)	285 cm (112 in)
	(Vietnam) Phạm Thị Hiền^{INJ}	MB	8 October 1999 (age 27)	1.72 m (5 ft 8 in)	55 kg (121 lb)	290 cm (110 in)	285 cm (112 in)

Notes:

- ^{OH} Outside Hitter
- ^{OP} Opposite Spiker
- ^{S} Setter
- ^{MB} Middle Blocker
- ^{L} Libero
- ^{INJ} Player withdrew from the squad due to an injury

=== Position main ===
Bộ Tư lệnh Thông tin
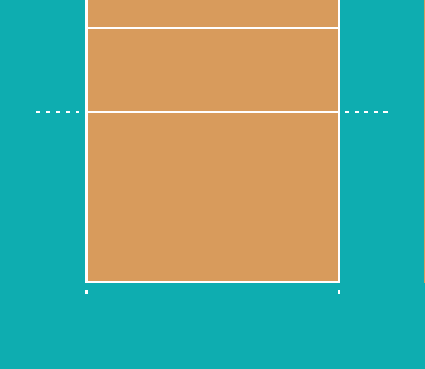

== Youth team ==
- Heach Coach: (Vietnam) Nguyễn Trọng Linh
- Assistant Coach: (Vietnam) Nguyễn Thanh Hải, (Vietnam) Nguyễn Linh Chi

No.	Player	Position	Birth date	Height
2	(Vietnam) Đinh Ngọc Vân Anh	Setter	2008	1m75
4	(Vietnam) Ngô Phương Thanh	Libero	2012	1m59
5	(Vietnam) Hoàng Khánh Linh	Libero	2009	1m65
6	(Vietnam) Nguyễn Võ Thảo Chi	Outside hitter	2009	1m72
7	(Vietnam) Phạm Thuỳ Trang	Middle blocker	2007	1m81
8	(Vietnam) Phan Kim Chi (c)	Opposite spiker	2007	1m74
9	(Vietnam) Lê Tố Uy	Libero	2007	1m55
10	(Vietnam) Lê Thị Hằng	Libero	2012	1m58
11	(Vietnam) Trần Phương	Outside hitter	2008	1m78
12	(Vietnam) Nguyễn Thị Mai Quỳnh	Outside hitter	2009	1m70
14	(Vietnam) Phạm Quỳnh Hương	Outside hitter	2008	1m86
15	(Vietnam) Nguyễn Trà Giang	Middle blocker	2007	1m76
16	(Vietnam) Nguyễn Phạm Diễm Thịnh	Outside hitter	2011	1m74
17	(Vietnam) Nguyễn Phạm Phương Nhi	Opposite spiker	2008	1m75
18	(Vietnam) Bùi Thị Châu	Middle blocker	2008	1m78
19	(Vietnam) Nguyễn Huyền Trang	Setter	2010	1m76
20	(Vietnam) Bùi Linh Đan	Middle blocker	2011	1m74
21	(Vietnam) Hồ Lê Thuỳ Dương	Opposite spiker	2009	1m74
25	(Vietnam) Nguyễn Dung Nhi	Middle blocker	2009	1m73

== Former head coach ==
- (Vietnam) Phạm Thanh Lãng (1970–1986)
- (Vietnam) Nguyễn Hữu Dông (1986–2000)
- (Vietnam) Phạm Văn Long (2001–2017, 2025–present)
- (Vietnam) Bùi Huy Sơn (2017–2021)
- (Vietnam) Phạm Minh Dũng (2021–2024)

== Notable players ==
Domestic players

Vietnam

- Đặng Thị Phụ
- Hoàng Thị Quế
- Trần Bích Khả
- Nguyễn Thanh Mai
- Nguyễn Thị Kim Thanh
- Bùi Bích Nụ
- Lê Thị Phúc
- Trần Thị Thủy
- Võ Thị Minh An
- Phạm Thanh Hà
- Lê Thị Tri
- Nguyễn Thị Thu Lan
- Phạm Thanh Nhận
- Đỗ Bích Ngọc
- Nguyễn Thúy Oanh
- Nguyễn Thị Kim Dung
- Nguyễn Thị Hiền
- Nguyễn Thị Thu Hằng
- Nguyễn Thị Tâm Anh
- Nguyễn Thị Dung
- Nguyễn Thị Thu Hương
- Phạm Thu Hương
- Ngô Tuyết Trinh
- Nguyễn Thị Nhâm
- Hà Thị Hoa
- Phạm Thị Ngọc Anh
- Nguyễn Thị Thu Ngọc
- Nguyễn Thị Kiên
- Nguyễn Hương Lan
- Nguyễn Thị Thu Trang
- Nguyễn Thị Hương
- Vũ Thị Thúy
- Bùi Thị Tám
- Trần Ngọc Diệp
- Bùi Thị Thảo Phương
- Lê Thị Thúy
- Vũ Thị Minh Nguyệt
- Phạm Thị Kim Huệ
- Phạm Thị Thu Trang
- Tạ Thị Diệu Linh
- Đặng Thị Thoan
- Phạm Thị Liên
- Vương Thị Mai
- Mai Thị Bích
- Phạm Thị Yến
- Hà Ngọc Diễm
- Đinh Thị Trà Giang
- Trần Thị Thảo
- Trần Tôn Nữ Ly Linh
- Nguyễn Thị Thu Hường
- Phạm Thị Minh Huệ
- Lý Thị Hồng Ngân
- Bùi Thị Minh Huệ
- Chu Thị Ngọc
- Đỗ Thị Minh
- Trần Thu Trang
- Phạm Thị Hồng Nhung
- Đặng Thu Huyền
- Vũ Thị Thu Hà
- Bùi Thị Bích Phương
- Đào Thị Huyền
- Bùi Thị Ngà
- Phạm Thị Huệ
- Nguyễn Thị Thanh Hương
- Vi Thị Như Quỳnh
- Phạm Thị Lệ Thảo
- Âu Hồng Nhung
- Đàm Thị Thuỳ Linh
- Trần Việt Hương
- Trần Thị Mỹ Hằng

Foreign players

Azerbaijan

- Jana Kulan

Bulgaria

- Slavina Koleva

Canada

- Andrea Mitrovic

China

- Chen Jing
- Li Yuchen
- Liu Wei
- Zhao Yanni
- Che Wenhan
- Sun Jie

Russia

- Irina Voronkova

Thailand

- Siriwan Deekaew
- Pleumjit Thinkaow
- Watchareeya Nuanjam
