= VTV Bình Điền Long An =

Vietnamese volleyball team

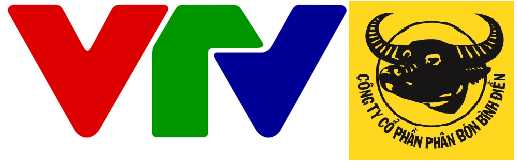
- Short name: VTV BĐ LA
- Founded: 1986; 40 years ago
- Ground: Long An Gymnasium, Tây Ninh Province, Vietnam (Capacity: 2,000)
- Chairman: (Vietnam) Phan Hùng Cường
- Head coach: (Vietnam) Nguyễn Thị Ngọc Hoa
- Captain: Võ Thị Kim Thoa
- League: Volleyball Vietnam League
- 2026: 3rd place
- Website: Club home page
- Championships: Vietnam League Champion

Uniforms
Home	Away

VTV Bình Điền Long An is a Vietnamese women's volleyball team from Tây Ninh, Vietnam. The club was founded in 1986 and plays in the Vietnam League.

== History ==
The team started as Long An Textile Women's Volleyball Club, which was established in 1986. Since its promotion to a strong team in 1990 until now, the team has been ranked 7 times in the top 3 national rankings (consecutive periods from 1993 to 1999). When Long An Textile Company was facing difficulties in production and business, the women's volleyball club was also affected, but the potential was huge.

In 2002, the team rejuvenated its squad. Members of the team then had an average height of 1m74, the average age was 20.75, and 2 members of the team was called up to the national team. On 26 August 2004, at the Department of Sports and Physical Training of Long An province, Binh Dien Fertilizer Joint Stock Company signed a contract to negotiate the acquisition and renaming of the team to Bình Điền Long An Women's Volleyball Club.

On 16 September 2004, the launching ceremony of the Women's Volleyball Club was held at the Long An Department of Culture, Sports and Tourism. With the investment capacity of Binh Dien Fertilizer Company, the team was believed to return to the top. The team has proven its strength by winning the Vietnam League six times by 2025.

On 26 November 2024, the 20th anniversary of the launch of the volleyball club VTV Bình Điền Long An with the title VTV Bình Điền Long An: 20 years - Steady Steps - Future Direction was held to honor generations of coaches, athletes, team leaders and summarize the team's achievements since its establishment in 2004. At the ceremony, in addition to rewarding individuals and teams, the team's leadership also oriented the team's future development by signing a memorandum of cooperation with the PFU BlueCats club of Japan.

VTV Bình Điền Long An had played in the AVC Women's Champions League (formerly the Asian Women's Club Volleyball Championship) five times (2010, 2012, 2018, 2019, and 2025). In the 2025 edition, the team finished as runners-up and qualified for the 2025 FIVB Women's Club World Championship. However, the club announced their withdrawal from the tournament citing cost and logistical concerns, and due to schedule conflict with the 2025 SEA Games, with some of the team members' joining the Vietnam national team.

== Current squad ==
As of 2026

- Head Coach: (Vietnam) Nguyễn Thị Ngọc Hoa
- Assistant Coach: (Vietnam) Trịnh Nguyễn Hoàng Huy (Vietnam) Kiều Xuân Vũ (Vietnam) Huỳnh Kim Anh Thư (Vietnam) Huỳnh Tấn Hiển

2026 squad
No.	Player	Position	Height (m)	Weight (kg)	Birth date
1	(Vietnam) Nguyễn Thị Trà My	Opposite	1.77	64	7 July 2004 (age 22)
2	(Vietnam) Đặng Thị Kim Thanh	Middle blocker/Opposite	1.78	63	28 March 1999 (age 27)
loan	(Vietnam) Trần Thị Thanh Thúy	Outside hitter	1.93	74	12 November 1997 (age 28)
4	(Vietnam) Trịnh Huỳnh Bảo Ngọc	Outside hitter/Middle blocker	1.80	72	23 October 2009 (age 17)
5	(Vietnam) Nguyễn Ngọc Anh	Libero	1.68	57	9 June 2008 (age 18)
6	(Vietnam) Nguyễn Thị Hồng Đào	Setter	1.75	76	24 July 1994 (age 32)
7	(Vietnam) Phạm Cao Trâm Anh	Opposite	1.70	55	30 September 2006 (age 20)
8	(Vietnam) Đoàn Thị Mỹ Tiên	Outside hitter/Opposite	1.75	75	3 July 2000 (age 26)
10	(Vietnam) Lê Như Anh	Middle blocker	1.78	57	23 July 2005 (age 21)
14	(Vietnam) Võ Thị Kim Thoa	Setter	1.73	67	18 March 1998 (age 28)
15	(Vietnam) Võ Thị Thảo Nguyên	Libero	1.72	59	22 February 2006 (age 20)
16	(Vietnam) Nguyễn Lan Vy	Outside hitter	1.72	67	18 February 2006 (age 20)
17	(Vietnam) Trần Nguyễn Quí Uyên	Setter	1.70	60	7 March 2001 (age 25)
18	(Vietnam) Nguyễn Ngọc Mỹ Tiên	Libero	1.70	63	5 August 2003 (age 23)
19	(United States) Jess Mruzik	Outside hitter	1.87	74	15 June 2002 (age 24)
20	(Vietnam) Lữ Thị Phương	Middle blocker	1.80	65	27 October 2002 (age 23)
26	(Vietnam) Nguyễn Thị Hương Ngò	Outside hitter	1.80	73	23 January 2004 (age 22)

=== Main team ===
VTV Bình Điền Long An

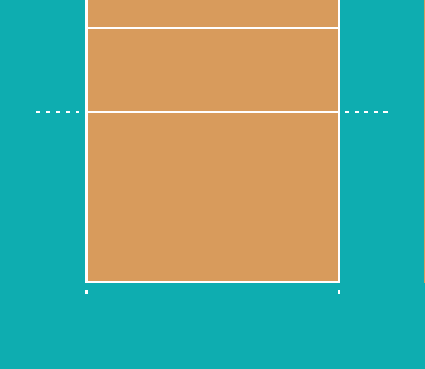

Source: TVL

== Youth team ==
As of February 2026

- Head Coach: (Vietnam) Nguyễn Quốc Vũ
- Assistant Coach: Kiều Xuân Vũ, Huỳnh Thị Thu Thảo

2025 squad
No.	Player	Position	Height (m)	Weight (kg)	Birth date
4	(Vietnam) Trịnh Huỳnh Bảo Ngọc	Middle Blocker	1.80	72	23 October 2009 (age 17)
7	(Vietnam) Đặng Thị Thiên Kim	Outside Hitter	1.72	57	2009 (age 16–17)
9	(Vietnam) Nguyễn Ngọc Anh	Libero	1.67	53	2008 (age 17–18)
10	(Vietnam) Đỗ Vũ Ngọc Anh	Middle Blocker	1.74	58	2008 (age 17–18)
12	(Vietnam) Nguyễn Ngọc Thiên Kim	Setter	1.71	64	2009 (age 16–17)
14	(Vietnam) Mai Ngọc Tuyền	Setter	1.74	57	2008 (age 17–18)
15	(Vietnam) Võ Thị Thúy Vy	Outside Hitter	1.75	60	2008 (age 17–18)
18	(Vietnam) Huỳnh Ngọc Thư	Middle Blocker	1.80	56	2008 (age 17–18)
19	(Vietnam) Trương Thị Như Quỳnh	Libero	1.74	56	2010 (age 15–16)
20	(Vietnam) Nguyễn Thúy Yến Vy	Middle Blocker	1.77	64	2007 (age 18–19)
22	(Vietnam) Lê Ngọc Tỷ	Outside Hitter	1.71	60	2008 (age 17–18)
23	(Vietnam) Nguyễn Từ Như Ý	Outside Hitter	1.78	58	2008 (age 17–18)
25	(Vietnam) Tào Khánh My	Outside Hitter	1.75	65	25 June 2008 (age 18)

== Loan players ==
2025 loan players
No.	Player	Position	Height (m)	To Team	Birth date
TBA	(Vietnam) Phan Đặng Thúy Hương	Outside Hitter	1.76	TP. Hồ Chí Minh VC	2002 (age 23–24)
TBA	(Vietnam) Nguyễn Thị Kim Giang	Setter	1.75	Quảng Ninh VC	2001 (age 24–25)
4	(Vietnam) Nguyễn Thị Cẩm Bình	Middle Blocker	1.77	Ho Chi Minh City VC	2002 (age 23–24)
2	(Vietnam) Lê Lê Bách Hợp	Setter	1.72	LP Bank Ninh Bình	2006 (age 19–20)
2	(Vietnam) Đặng Thị Mỹ Duyên	Middle Blocker	1.74	Ho Chi Minh City VC	2003 (age 22–23)

== Honours ==
=== Domestic competitions ===
- Vietnam League
  - Winners: 2009, 2011, 2017, 2018, 2024, 2025
  - Runner-up: 2007, 2014
  - 3rd place: 2008, 2010, 2012, 2015, 2016, 2022, 2023, 2026
  - 4th place: 2006, 2019
- Hung Vuong Cup - Final Round 1
  - Winners: 2005, 2015, 2018, 2019, 2021, 2024
  - Runner-up: 2007, 2009, 2011, 2017
  - 3rd place: 2010, 2012, 2016, 2025
- Hoa Lu Cup
  - Winners: 2008, 2021, 2022, 2026
  - Runner-up: 2023, 2024
  - 3rd place: 2025
- VTV Cup
  - 4 appearances: 2007 (9th), 2009 (5th), 2010 (4th), 2011 (9th)
- MHB Cup – VTV9 Binh Dien Cup
  - Winners: 2007, 2010
  - Runner-up: 2006, 2008, 2012, 2014, 2017, 2026
  - 3rd place: 2016, 2018
  - 4th place: 2015, 2019, 2024
- Vietnam Volleyball Super Cup
  - Winners: 2009, 2011, 2016
  - Runner-up: 2017, 2018
  - 3rd place: 2014, 2015
- LienVietPostBank Cup
  - Runner-up: 2014, 2017
  - 3rd place: 2013, 2019
- Vietnam National Games
  - Winners: 2018
  - Runners-up : 2006, 2010, 2014, 2022
- Vietnam League (defunct)
  - Winners: 1993, 1997
  - Runners-up: 1995, 1998, 1999
  - 3rd place: 1992, 1994, 1996

=== Youth competitions ===
- Vietnam Youth Volleyball Championship
  - Winners: 2009, 2010, 2012, 2013, 2018, 2022, 2023, 2024
  - Runners-up: 2014, 2017, 2019, 2020, 2025
  - 3rd place: 2015, 2016, 2026
- Vietnam Youth Volleyball Club Championship
  - Winners: 2011, 2015, 2017, 2018, 2023
  - Runners-up: 2014, 2019, 2020, 2022
  - 3rd place: 2012, 2016, 2025
- Vietnam U-23 Volleyball Championship
  - Winners: 2024
  - 3rd place: 2020, 2026

=== International competitions ===
- FIVB Women's Club World Championship 0 appearances
  - 2025 — Qualified but withdrew
- AVC Women's Champions League 5 appearances
  - 2010 — 7th place
  - 2012 — 5th place
  - 2018 — 7th place
  - 2019 — 7th place
  - 2025 — Runner-up
- SEALECT Volleyball Cup (Thailand)
  - 2018 — Runner-up
  - 2025 — 5th place

== Coach ==
- (Vietnam) Thái Quang Lai
- (Vietnam) Lê Thái Bình
- (Vietnam) Lương Nguyễn Ngọc Hiền
- (Vietnam) Nguyễn Quốc Vũ
- (Vietnam) Nguyễn Văn Hải
- (Vietnam) Lương Khương Thượng
- (Thailand) Kittipong Pornchartyingcheep
- (China) Vương Quân
- (Japan) Shimizu Mikihiro

== Notable players ==
Domestic players

Vietnam

- Ngô Thị Vàng
- Nguyễn Thị Hộ
- Nguyễn Thị Hoa
- Nguyễn Thị Kim Thoa
- Nguyễn Thị Thúy
- Trịnh Thị Thu Dung
- Phạm Thị Bé Tư
- Huỳnh Kim Anh Thư
- Trần Thị Cẩm Thúy
- Nguyễn Thị Ánh Hoa
- Lâm Thị Thu Sáu
- Lê Thị Bích Liên
- Đinh Thị Diệu Châu
- Nguyễn Thị Nhung
- Nguyễn Thị Kiều Oanh
- Lương Thu Phương
- Nguyễn Thị Thu Nhiên
- Dương Thị Nhàn
- Lê Thị Ánh Nguyệt
- Nguyễn Thị Mỹ Nga
- Võ Thị Kim Đính
- H'Mia Eban
- Hà Ngọc Diễm
- Đoàn Thị Khen
- Nguyễn Thị Trinh
- Nguyễn Thị Thanh Diệu
- Trương Thụy Anh Phương
- Đinh Thị Trà Giang
- Nguyễn Thị Hồng Đào
- Nguyễn Thị Ngọc Hoa
- Phạm Thu Hà
- Nguyễn Thị Bích Tuyền
- Dương Thị Hên
- Nguyễn Thị Bích Trâm
- Nguyễn Hoàng Ánh Ngọc
- Huỳnh Thị Hồng Nhung
- Trần Thị Tuyết Hoa
- Nguyễn Thị Kim Liên
- Đào Thị Nhung
- Phạm Thị Cẩm Linh
- Huỳnh Thị Quế Nhi
- Thạch Thị Mỹ Hằng
- Lâm Thị Tuyết Mai
- Lê Thị Ngọc Trâm
- Đặng Thị Mỹ Duyên
- Nguyễn Thị Kim Giang
- Huỳnh Thị Ngọc Thư
- Nguyễn Thị Như Ngọc
- Phan Khánh Vy
- Vi Thị Như Quỳnh
- Nguyễn Khánh Đang

Foreign players

Azerbaijan

- Odina Aliyeva

China

- Zhao Wenying
- Chen Peiyan

Cuba

- Lianet García Anglada
- Regla Martínez Ortiz

Fiji

- Anaseini Seniloli

Germany

- Joyce Agbolossou

Poland

- Natalia Lijewska

Serbia

- Aleksandra Terzić

Thailand

- Utaiwan Kaensing
- Jutarat Montripila
- Em-orn Phanusit
- Bualee Jaroensri
- Siriporn Sooksen
- Amporn Hyapha
- Narumon Khanan
- Wilavan Apinyapong

United States

- Roni Jones-Perry
