= 2016 Asian Women's Club Volleyball Championship squads =

This article shows the rosters of all participating teams at the 2016 Asian Women's Club Volleyball Championship in Biñan, Philippines.

== Pool A ==
=== Foton Pilipinas ===
The following is the roster of the Filipino club Foton Pilipinas in the 2016 Asian Women's Club Volleyball Championship.

Head coach: (Italy) Fabio Menta

No.	Name	Date of birth	Height	Weight	Spike	Block
1	(Philippines) Rhea Dimaculangan	21 March 1991	1.70 m (5 ft 7 in)	66 kg (146 lb)	275 cm (108 in)	268 cm (106 in)
2	(Philippines) Aby Maraño	22 December 1992	1.75 m (5 ft 9 in)	54 kg (119 lb)	280 cm (110 in)	270 cm (110 in)
3	(Philippines) Jaja Santiago (C)	20 January 1996	1.91 m (6 ft 3 in)	68 kg (150 lb)	280 cm (110 in)	277 cm (109 in)
4	(Philippines) Patty Jane Orendain	10 August 1992	1.65 m (5 ft 5 in)	58 kg (128 lb)	266 cm (105 in)	258 cm (102 in)
5	(Philippines) Jovelyn Gonzaga	30 October 1991	1.73 m (5 ft 8 in)	51 kg (112 lb)	273 cm (107 in)	274 cm (108 in)
7	(Philippines) Ennajie Laure	31 July 1997	1.75 m (5 ft 9 in)	64 kg (141 lb)	280 cm (110 in)	275 cm (108 in)
8	(Philippines) Angeli Pauline Araneta	13 September 1993	1.78 m (5 ft 10 in)	70 kg (150 lb)	271 cm (107 in)	270 cm (110 in)
9	(Philippines) Ivy Jisel Perez	13 February 1995	1.73 m (5 ft 8 in)	55 kg (121 lb)	271 cm (107 in)	270 cm (110 in)
10	(Philippines) Maika Angela Ortiz	30 August 1991	1.78 m (5 ft 10 in)	74 kg (163 lb)	290 cm (110 in)	285 cm (112 in)
11	(Philippines) Bia General	27 August 1995	1.68 m (5 ft 6 in)	56 kg (123 lb)	266 cm (105 in)	248 cm (98 in)
13	(Philippines) Jennylyn Reyes	12 January 1991	1.57 m (5 ft 2 in)	51 kg (112 lb)	258 cm (102 in)	240 cm (94 in)
15	(United States) Lindsay Stalzer	15 July 1984	1.85 m (6 ft 1 in)	70 kg (150 lb)	280 cm (110 in)	277 cm (109 in)
16	(Philippines) Sisi Rondina	4 September 1996	1.68 m (5 ft 6 in)	55 kg (121 lb)	278 cm (109 in)	270 cm (110 in)
17	(United States) Ariel Usher	6 January 1991	1.91 m (6 ft 3 in)	73 kg (161 lb)	280 cm (110 in)	277 cm (109 in)

=== Liên Việt Post Bank ===
The following is the roster of the Vietnamese club Liên Việt Post Bank in the 2016 Asian Women's Club Volleyball Championship.

Head coach: (Vietnam) Phạm Văn Long

No.	Name	Date of birth	Height	Weight	Spike	Block
1	(Vietnam) Trần Thị Thảo	24 November 1991	1.73 m (5 ft 8 in)	55 kg (121 lb)	288 cm (113 in)	282 cm (111 in)
2	(Vietnam) Âu Hồng Nhung	27 May 1993	1.72 m (5 ft 8 in)	62 kg (137 lb)	285 cm (112 in)	285 cm (112 in)
3	(Vietnam) Nguyễn Thị Thanh Hương	4 March 1996	1.73 m (5 ft 8 in)	53 kg (117 lb)	285 cm (112 in)	281 cm (111 in)
4	(Vietnam) Trần Thu Trang	31 July 1989	1.73 m (5 ft 8 in)	68 kg (150 lb)	301 cm (119 in)	291 cm (115 in)
8	(Vietnam) Trần Việt Hương	31 October 1998	1.78 m (5 ft 10 in)	66 kg (146 lb)	286 cm (113 in)	281 cm (111 in)
9	(Vietnam) Đỗ Thị Minh (C)	3 August 1988	1.73 m (5 ft 8 in)	63 kg (139 lb)	285 cm (112 in)	285 cm (112 in)
10	(Vietnam) Nguyễn Linh Chi	31 July 1990	1.73 m (5 ft 8 in)	62 kg (137 lb)	286 cm (113 in)	281 cm (111 in)
11	(Vietnam) Vương Thị Mai	30 April 1992	1.75 m (5 ft 9 in)	61 kg (134 lb)	281 cm (111 in)	281 cm (111 in)
12	(Vietnam) Trần Tôn Nữ Ly Linh	26 January 1992	1.78 m (5 ft 10 in)	65 kg (143 lb)	291 cm (115 in)	285 cm (112 in)
15	(Vietnam) Lưu Thị Ly Ly	20 October 1998	1.69 m (5 ft 7 in)	64 kg (141 lb)	281 cm (111 in)	275 cm (108 in)
17	(Vietnam) Phạm Thị Nguyệt Anh	13 December 1998	1.74 m (5 ft 9 in)	60 kg (130 lb)	293 cm (115 in)	285 cm (112 in)
19	(Vietnam) Đoàn Thị Lâm Oanh	6 July 1998	1.77 m (5 ft 10 in)	67 kg (148 lb)	289 cm (114 in)	285 cm (112 in)

=== Kwai Tsing ===
The following is the roster of the Hong Kong club Kwai Tsing in the 2016 Asian Women's Club Volleyball Championship.

Head coach: (Hong Kong) Lam Chun Kwok

No.	Name	Date of birth	Height	Weight	Spike	Block
1	(Hong Kong) Mui Pik Sum	11 November 1994	1.74 m (5 ft 9 in)	67 kg (148 lb)	275 cm (108 in)	265 cm (104 in)
2	(Hong Kong) Kwok Chun Chi	28 June 1994	1.74 m (5 ft 9 in)	67 kg (148 lb)	275 cm (108 in)	265 cm (104 in)
3	(Hong Kong) Kwok Pui Yiu	20 September 1991	1.73 m (5 ft 8 in)	62 kg (137 lb)	275 cm (108 in)	270 cm (110 in)
4	(Hong Kong) Tam Ho Yan	31 October 1993	1.65 m (5 ft 5 in)	55 kg (121 lb)	270 cm (110 in)	265 cm (104 in)
5	(Hong Kong) Law Ho Fung	10 May 1995	1.68 m (5 ft 6 in)	63 kg (139 lb)	270 cm (110 in)	275 cm (108 in)
6	(Hong Kong) Chan Eu Eu	1 October 1988	1.55 m (5 ft 1 in)	55 kg (121 lb)	240 cm (94 in)	230 cm (91 in)
7	(Hong Kong) Cheung Man Lee (C)	15 August 1987	1.74 m (5 ft 9 in)	59 kg (130 lb)	275 cm (108 in)	270 cm (110 in)
8	(Hong Kong) Fung Wing Yan	7 March 1990	1.75 m (5 ft 9 in)	74 kg (163 lb)	275 cm (108 in)	270 cm (110 in)
9	(Hong Kong) Szeto Wun Kee	23 June 1994	1.70 m (5 ft 7 in)	65 kg (143 lb)	270 cm (110 in)	265 cm (104 in)
10	(Hong Kong) Chan Han Ming	15 June 1992	1.72 m (5 ft 8 in)	55 kg (121 lb)	275 cm (108 in)	265 cm (104 in)
11	(Hong Kong) Siu Ho Yan	17 April 1994	1.60 m (5 ft 3 in)	47 kg (104 lb)	240 cm (94 in)	230 cm (91 in)
12	(Hong Kong) Wong Bo Kwan	27 June 1992	1.68 m (5 ft 6 in)	56 kg (123 lb)	270 cm (110 in)	265 cm (104 in)
13	(Hong Kong) Yeung Sau Mei	30 August 1985	1.83 m (6 ft 0 in)	64 kg (141 lb)	280 cm (110 in)	275 cm (108 in)
14	(Hong Kong) Chow Yin Lam	20 April 1996	1.73 m (5 ft 8 in)	58 kg (128 lb)	270 cm (110 in)	265 cm (104 in)
15	(Hong Kong) Yu Ying Chi	7 August 1992	1.69 m (5 ft 7 in)	58 kg (128 lb)	270 cm (110 in)	265 cm (104 in)
17	(Hong Kong) Ng Ka Ki	17 September 1985	1.76 m (5 ft 9 in)	65 kg (143 lb)	265 cm (104 in)	265 cm (104 in)
18	(Hong Kong) Yau Ching	18 January 1996	1.73 m (5 ft 8 in)	65 kg (143 lb)	275 cm (108 in)	265 cm (104 in)

== Pool B ==
=== Bangkok Glass ===
The following is the roster of the Thai club Bangkok Glass in the 2016 Asian Women's Club Volleyball Championship.

Head coach: (Thailand) Kittipong Pornchartyingcheep

No.	Name	Date of birth	Height	Weight	Spike	Block
1	(Thailand) Maliwan Prabnarong	27 August 1990	1.73 m (5 ft 8 in)	58 kg (128 lb)	280 cm (110 in)	275 cm (108 in)
3	(Thailand) Sutadta Chuewulim	19 December 1992	1.73 m (5 ft 8 in)	67 kg (148 lb)	283 cm (111 in)	278 cm (109 in)
5	(Thailand) Pleumjit Thinkaow (C)	9 November 1983	1.80 m (5 ft 11 in)	64 kg (141 lb)	298 cm (117 in)	293 cm (115 in)
6	(Thailand) Thidarat Pengwichai	28 November 1992	1.78 m (5 ft 10 in)	75 kg (165 lb)	290 cm (110 in)	280 cm (110 in)
8	(Thailand) Wilavan Apinyapong	6 June 1984	1.74 m (5 ft 9 in)	67 kg (148 lb)	294 cm (116 in)	280 cm (110 in)
9	(Thailand) Jarasporn Bundasak	1 March 1993	1.80 m (5 ft 11 in)	64 kg (141 lb)	293 cm (115 in)	285 cm (112 in)
10	(Thailand) Jutarat Montripila	2 October 1986	1.75 m (5 ft 9 in)	67 kg (148 lb)	290 cm (110 in)	280 cm (110 in)
11	(Thailand) Pornpun Guedpard	5 May 1993	1.72 m (5 ft 8 in)	70 kg (150 lb)	294 cm (116 in)	290 cm (110 in)
12	(Thailand) Karina Krause	12 February 1989	1.78 m (5 ft 10 in)	65 kg (143 lb)	295 cm (116 in)	285 cm (112 in)
13	(Thailand) Witita Balee	27 March 1991	1.70 m (5 ft 7 in)	56 kg (123 lb)	270 cm (110 in)	262 cm (103 in)
15	(Thailand) Tikamporn Changkeaw	12 December 1984	1.66 m (5 ft 5 in)	65 kg (143 lb)	270 cm (110 in)	258 cm (102 in)
16	(United States) Ashley Frazier	15 December 1989	1.87 m (6 ft 2 in)	70 kg (150 lb)	302 cm (119 in)	294 cm (116 in)
17	(Thailand) Wanida Kotruang	29 June 1990	1.70 m (5 ft 7 in)	60 kg (130 lb)	283 cm (111 in)	272 cm (107 in)
20	(Vietnam) Nguyễn Thị Ngọc Hoa	10 November 1987	1.83 m (6 ft 0 in)	64 kg (141 lb)	295 cm (116 in)	293 cm (115 in)

=== April 25 ===
The following is the roster of the North Korean club April 25 in the 2016 Asian Women's Club Volleyball Championship.

Head coach: (Serbia) Moro Branislav

No.	Name	Date of birth	Height	Weight	Spike	Block
1	(North Korea) Kim Un Jong	2 July 1991	1.82 m (6 ft 0 in)	70 kg (150 lb)	306 cm (120 in)	290 cm (110 in)
2	(North Korea) Kim Yong Mi	14 November 1992	1.76 m (5 ft 9 in)	67 kg (148 lb)	300 cm (120 in)	285 cm (112 in)
3	(North Korea) Jong Jin Sim (C)	1 February 1992	1.82 m (6 ft 0 in)	70 kg (150 lb)	308 cm (121 in)	292 cm (115 in)
5	(North Korea) Ju Un Hyang	2 October 1990	1.73 m (5 ft 8 in)	65 kg (143 lb)	303 cm (119 in)	280 cm (110 in)
6	(North Korea) Min Ok Ju	2 September 1990	1.76 m (5 ft 9 in)	70 kg (150 lb)	297 cm (117 in)	280 cm (110 in)
8	(North Korea) Ro Un Yong	23 September 1994	1.75 m (5 ft 9 in)	58 kg (128 lb)	292 cm (115 in)	280 cm (110 in)
9	(North Korea) Rim Hyang	6 January 1994	1.71 m (5 ft 7 in)	61 kg (134 lb)	288 cm (113 in)	275 cm (108 in)
10	(North Korea) Kang Suk Gyong	18 October 1993	1.75 m (5 ft 9 in)	65 kg (143 lb)	300 cm (120 in)	285 cm (112 in)
11	(North Korea) Kim Ok Sol	12 October 1998	1.82 m (6 ft 0 in)	68 kg (150 lb)	298 cm (117 in)	285 cm (112 in)
14	(North Korea) Ri Sun Jong	19 May 1990	1.77 m (5 ft 10 in)	64 kg (141 lb)	295 cm (116 in)	280 cm (110 in)
15	(North Korea) Ri Ra Hyang	13 July 1997	1.79 m (5 ft 10 in)	70 kg (150 lb)	300 cm (120 in)	285 cm (112 in)
16	(North Korea) Hwang Haw Yon	13 August 1998	1.76 m (5 ft 9 in)	71 kg (157 lb)	302 cm (119 in)	288 cm (113 in)

=== Sarmayeh Bank Tehran ===
The following is the roster of the Iranian club Sarmayeh Bank Tehran in the 2016 Asian Women's Club Volleyball Championship.

Head coach: (Slovenia) Majda Cicic

No.	Name	Date of birth	Height	Weight	Spike	Block
1	(Iran) Mahdieh Kajehkolaei	13 September 1988	1.83 m (6 ft 0 in)	72 kg (159 lb)	275 cm (108 in)	265 cm (104 in)
2	(Iran) Negin Shirtari	3 March 1998	1.85 m (6 ft 1 in)	80 kg (180 lb)	281 cm (111 in)	271 cm (107 in)
4	(Iran) Soudabeh Bagherpour	16 September 1990	1.88 m (6 ft 2 in)	66 kg (146 lb)	281 cm (111 in)	271 cm (107 in)
6	(Iran) Shabnam Alikhani	25 September 1992	1.75 m (5 ft 9 in)	60 kg (130 lb)	271 cm (107 in)	261 cm (103 in)
7	(Iran) Zeinab Giveh (C)	11 July 1983	1.76 m (5 ft 9 in)	64 kg (141 lb)	265 cm (104 in)	255 cm (100 in)
8	(Iran) Mahsa Saberi	14 February 1993	1.78 m (5 ft 10 in)	73 kg (161 lb)	280 cm (110 in)	270 cm (110 in)
9	(Iran) Neda Chamlanian	7 March 1994	1.82 m (6 ft 0 in)	72 kg (159 lb)	275 cm (108 in)	264 cm (104 in)
10	(Iran) Maedeh Borhani	22 June 1988	1.83 m (6 ft 0 in)	72 kg (159 lb)	287 cm (113 in)	277 cm (109 in)
11	(Iran) Mahsa Kadkhoda	22 June 1993	1.82 m (6 ft 0 in)	72 kg (159 lb)	275 cm (108 in)	265 cm (104 in)
12	(Iran) Farzaneh Zarei	29 October 1991	1.82 m (6 ft 0 in)	73 kg (161 lb)	273 cm (107 in)	260 cm (100 in)
13	(Iran) Negar Kiani	8 June 1992	1.70 m (5 ft 7 in)	60 kg (130 lb)	259 cm (102 in)	249 cm (98 in)
14	(Iran) Negar Kiani	8 June 1992	1.70 m (5 ft 7 in)	60 kg (130 lb)	259 cm (102 in)	249 cm (98 in)
16	(Iran) Farzaneh Moradianganjeh	6 June 1992	1.70 m (5 ft 7 in)	60 kg (130 lb)	259 cm (102 in)	249 cm (98 in)
17	(Iran) Shekoufeh Safari	7 March 1989	1.89 m (6 ft 2 in)	81 kg (179 lb)	290 cm (110 in)	280 cm (110 in)

== Pool C ==
=== NEC Red Rockets ===
The following is the roster of the Japanese club NEC Red Rockets in the 2016 Asian Women's Club Volleyball Championship.

Head coach: (Japan) Akinori Yamada

No.	Name	Date of birth	Height	Weight	Spike	Block
2	(Japan) Sarina Koga	21 May 1996	1.80 m (5 ft 11 in)	66 kg (146 lb)	305 cm (120 in)	290 cm (110 in)
4	(Japan) Kaname Yamaguchi	6 November 1989	1.70 m (5 ft 7 in)	67 kg (148 lb)	293 cm (115 in)	265 cm (104 in)
5	(Japan) Kana Ono	30 June 1992	1.80 m (5 ft 11 in)	70 kg (150 lb)	301 cm (119 in)	285 cm (112 in)
6	(Japan) Akari Oumi (C)	10 November 1989	1.71 m (5 ft 7 in)	63 kg (139 lb)	291 cm (115 in)	265 cm (104 in)
7	(Japan) Haruyo Shimamura	4 March 1992	1.82 m (6 ft 0 in)	78 kg (172 lb)	300 cm (120 in)	283 cm (111 in)
8	(Japan) Miku Torigoe	16 October 1992	1.63 m (5 ft 4 in)	58 kg (128 lb)	287 cm (113 in)	268 cm (106 in)
9	(Japan) Rina Sho	17 August 1992	1.64 m (5 ft 5 in)	56 kg (123 lb)	287 cm (113 in)	260 cm (100 in)
10	(Japan) Sayaka Iwasaki	18 July 1990	1.58 m (5 ft 2 in)	50 kg (110 lb)	270 cm (110 in)	250 cm (98 in)
11	(Japan) Kaori Ueno	6 January 1995	1.80 m (5 ft 11 in)	73 kg (161 lb)	293 cm (115 in)	275 cm (108 in)
12	(Japan) Ayana Oyama	13 July 1994	1.77 m (5 ft 10 in)	61 kg (134 lb)	295 cm (116 in)	275 cm (108 in)
13	(Japan) Naoko Yataka	4 December 1991	1.76 m (5 ft 9 in)	68 kg (150 lb)	299 cm (118 in)	273 cm (107 in)
14	(Japan) Nami Sagawa	1 August 1995	1.80 m (5 ft 11 in)	75 kg (165 lb)	300 cm (120 in)	278 cm (109 in)
15	(Japan) Mizuki Yanakita	26 March 1996	1.68 m (5 ft 6 in)	64 kg (141 lb)	300 cm (120 in)	270 cm (110 in)
16	(Japan) Yuna Okuyama	26 September 1995	1.76 m (5 ft 9 in)	67 kg (148 lb)	285 cm (112 in)	270 cm (110 in)
17	(Japan) Sayaka Shinohara	6 August 1996	1.64 m (5 ft 5 in)	56 kg (123 lb)	287 cm (113 in)	260 cm (100 in)
18	(Japan) Nanami Hirose	12 May 1997	1.77 m (5 ft 10 in)	64 kg (141 lb)	306 cm (120 in)	278 cm (109 in)

=== Altay ===
The following is the roster of the Kazakhstani club Altay in the 2016 Asian Women's Club Volleyball Championship.

Head coach: (Turkey) Burhan Şaik Canbolat

No.	Name	Date of birth	Height	Weight	Spike	Block
1	(United States) Hayley Spelman	11 June 1991	2.03 m (6 ft 8 in)	79 kg (174 lb)	305 cm (120 in)	295 cm (116 in)
2	(Kazakhstan) Sana Anarkulova	21 July 1989	1.88 m (6 ft 2 in)	72 kg (159 lb)	300 cm (120 in)	295 cm (116 in)
3	(Russia) Olga Biryukova	19 September 1994	1.93 m (6 ft 4 in)	79 kg (174 lb)	305 cm (120 in)	300 cm (120 in)
4	(Kazakhstan) Aliya Sadykova	1 August 1988	1.72 m (5 ft 8 in)	60 kg (130 lb)	270 cm (110 in)	260 cm (100 in)
6	(Puerto Rico) Raymariely Santos	13 April 1992	1.83 m (6 ft 0 in)	72 kg (159 lb)	290 cm (110 in)	288 cm (113 in)
7	(Kazakhstan) Inna German	17 January 1983	1.83 m (6 ft 0 in)	75 kg (165 lb)	290 cm (110 in)	280 cm (110 in)
9	(Kazakhstan) Irina Lukomskaya	19 March 1991	1.76 m (5 ft 9 in)	67 kg (148 lb)	275 cm (108 in)	265 cm (104 in)
10	(Kazakhstan) Yelena Ezau	9 March 1983	1.73 m (5 ft 8 in)	57 kg (126 lb)	275 cm (108 in)	265 cm (104 in)
12	(Kazakhstan) Ainagul Aizharikhova	4 September 1994	1.85 m (6 ft 1 in)	65 kg (143 lb)	290 cm (110 in)	280 cm (110 in)
14	(Kazakhstan) Alessya Safronova	10 February 1986	1.89 m (6 ft 2 in)	66 kg (146 lb)	295 cm (116 in)	285 cm (112 in)
15	(Kazakhstan) Evgenia Ilina	14 August 1991	1.87 m (6 ft 2 in)	83 kg (183 lb)	295 cm (116 in)	285 cm (112 in)
16	(Kazakhstan) Inna Matveyeva (C)	12 October 1978	1.88 m (6 ft 2 in)	70 kg (150 lb)	295 cm (116 in)	285 cm (112 in)
17	(Bulgaria) Vanya Varbanova	8 April 1985	1.83 m (6 ft 0 in)	68 kg (150 lb)	295 cm (116 in)	285 cm (112 in)
18	(Kazakhstan) Kristina Anikonova	5 January 1991	1.84 m (6 ft 0 in)	72 kg (159 lb)	290 cm (110 in)	280 cm (110 in)

=== Jakarta Electric PLN ===
The following is the roster of the Indonesian club Jakarta Electric PLN in the 2016 Asian Women's Club Volleyball Championship.

Head coach: (China) Tian Mei

No.	Name	Date of birth	Height	Weight	Spike	Block
1	(Indonesia) Shella Onnan	31 October 1999	1.77 m (5 ft 10 in)	55 kg (121 lb)	280 cm (110 in)	270 cm (110 in)
3	(Indonesia) Ajeng Irianti	6 November 1989	1.70 m (5 ft 7 in)	67 kg (148 lb)	293 cm (115 in)	265 cm (104 in)
4	(Indonesia) Agfarida Maharani	12 January 1994	1.75 m (5 ft 9 in)	60 kg (130 lb)	280 cm (110 in)	270 cm (110 in)
5	(Indonesia) Berllian Marsheilla	22 December 1989	1.72 m (5 ft 8 in)	60 kg (130 lb)	210 cm (83 in)	200 cm (79 in)
6	(Thailand) Wanitchaya Luangtonglang	7 October 1992	1.77 m (5 ft 10 in)	60 kg (130 lb)	300 cm (120 in)	300 cm (120 in)
7	(Indonesia) Aprilia Manganang (C)	27 April 1992	1.70 m (5 ft 7 in)	70 kg (150 lb)	310 cm (120 in)	300 cm (120 in)
8	(Indonesia) Octa Sabila	24 October 2000	1.78 m (5 ft 10 in)	70 kg (150 lb)	280 cm (110 in)	270 cm (110 in)
9	(Indonesia) Pungky Afriecia	24 April 1994	1.70 m (5 ft 7 in)	69 kg (152 lb)	260 cm (100 in)	260 cm (100 in)
11	(Thailand) Kuttika Kaewpin	16 August 1994	1.68 m (5 ft 6 in)	60 kg (130 lb)	285 cm (112 in)	268 cm (106 in)
12	(Indonesia) Chika Pratiwi	29 June 1991	1.65 m (5 ft 5 in)	51 kg (112 lb)	210 cm (83 in)	200 cm (79 in)
13	(Indonesia) Aprilia Maharani	12 April 1991	1.70 m (5 ft 7 in)	58 kg (128 lb)	210 cm (83 in)	200 cm (79 in)
14	(Indonesia) Gunarti Indahyani	2 July 1985	1.64 m (5 ft 5 in)	55 kg (121 lb)	210 cm (83 in)	200 cm (79 in)
17	(Indonesia) Nety Puspitarani	3 September 1990	1.75 m (5 ft 9 in)	65 kg (143 lb)	280 cm (110 in)	270 cm (110 in)
18	(Indonesia) Dian Wijayanti	25 April 1994	1.72 m (5 ft 8 in)	70 kg (150 lb)	280 cm (110 in)	270 cm (110 in)

== Pool D ==
=== Ba'yi Shenzhen ===
The following is the roster of the Chinese club Ba'yi Shenzhen in the 2016 Asian Women's Club Volleyball Championship.

Head coach: (China) Yu Juemin

No.	Name	Date of birth	Height	Weight	Spike	Block
1	(China) Wang Yunlu	20 May 1996	1.92 m (6 ft 4 in)	82 kg (181 lb)	315 cm (124 in)	308 cm (121 in)
2	(China) Zhong Yujie	13 October 1991	1.81 m (5 ft 11 in)	68 kg (150 lb)	298 cm (117 in)	292 cm (115 in)
3	(China) Shi Peixin	26 July 1996	1.93 m (6 ft 4 in)	76 kg (168 lb)	310 cm (120 in)	305 cm (120 in)
4	(China) Liu Taoxiaoyu	28 December 1996	1.94 m (6 ft 4 in)	70 kg (150 lb)	307 cm (121 in)	300 cm (120 in)
5	(China) Liu Yanhan	9 January 1993	1.88 m (6 ft 2 in)	75 kg (165 lb)	315 cm (124 in)	305 cm (120 in)
6	(China) Yang Junjing	15 May 1989	1.90 m (6 ft 3 in)	70 kg (150 lb)	315 cm (124 in)	300 cm (120 in)
7	(China) Shen Jingsi (C)	3 May 1989	1.86 m (6 ft 1 in)	75 kg (165 lb)	305 cm (120 in)	300 cm (120 in)
8	(China) Fan Linlin	1 December 1991	1.90 m (6 ft 3 in)	77 kg (170 lb)	315 cm (124 in)	305 cm (120 in)
9	(China) Chen Yao	22 September 1988	1.91 m (6 ft 3 in)	73 kg (161 lb)	315 cm (124 in)	305 cm (120 in)
10	(China) Zuo Ting	3 February 1990	1.84 m (6 ft 0 in)	66 kg (146 lb)	310 cm (120 in)	300 cm (120 in)
11	(China) Qi Lin	25 May 1993	1.85 m (6 ft 1 in)	65 kg (143 lb)	308 cm (121 in)	298 cm (117 in)
12	(China) Yuan Xinyue	21 December 1996	1.99 m (6 ft 6 in)	80 kg (180 lb)	321 cm (126 in)	308 cm (121 in)
13	(China) Yan Kailun	17 July 1995	1.92 m (6 ft 4 in)	62 kg (137 lb)	316 cm (124 in)	305 cm (120 in)
14	(China) Yuan Weiyu	25 March 1995	1.83 m (6 ft 0 in)	71 kg (157 lb)	305 cm (120 in)	295 cm (116 in)
16	(China) Wang Yan	10 March 1988	1.83 m (6 ft 0 in)	70 kg (150 lb)	310 cm (120 in)	306 cm (120 in)
17	(China) Huang Liuyan	13 June 1994	1.80 m (5 ft 11 in)	63 kg (139 lb)	305 cm (120 in)	295 cm (116 in)
18	(China) Wang Qi	22 September 1993	1.88 m (6 ft 2 in)	70 kg (150 lb)	305 cm (120 in)	300 cm (120 in)
20	(China) Liu Congcong	8 December 1990	1.88 m (6 ft 2 in)	70 kg (150 lb)	310 cm (120 in)	305 cm (120 in)

=== T. Grand ===
The following is the roster of the Taiwanese club T. Grand in the 2016 Asian Women's Club Volleyball Championship.

Head coach: (Chinese Taipei) Lo Chung-jen

No.	Name	Date of birth	Height	Weight	Spike	Block
1	(Chinese Taipei) Cheng Tzu-yun	9 April 1999	1.69 m (5 ft 7 in)	61 kg (134 lb)	285 cm (112 in)	276 cm (109 in)
2	(Chinese Taipei) Liu Shuang-ling	2 February 2000	1.77 m (5 ft 10 in)	68 kg (150 lb)	295 cm (116 in)	285 cm (112 in)
3	(Chinese Taipei) Huang Ching-hsuan	16 November 1998	1.80 m (5 ft 11 in)	64 kg (141 lb)	305 cm (120 in)	300 cm (120 in)
4	(Chinese Taipei) Wen Yi-chin	21 January 2001	1.75 m (5 ft 9 in)	68 kg (150 lb)	290 cm (110 in)	282 cm (111 in)
6	(Chinese Taipei) Chang Jia-ling	29 September 1999	1.77 m (5 ft 10 in)	73 kg (161 lb)	300 cm (120 in)	292 cm (115 in)
7	(Chinese Taipei) Liu Yu-chun	10 May 2000	1.72 m (5 ft 8 in)	62 kg (137 lb)	280 cm (110 in)	273 cm (107 in)
8	(Chinese Taipei) Liao Ying-chun	28 January 1999	1.74 m (5 ft 9 in)	59 kg (130 lb)	288 cm (113 in)	281 cm (111 in)
9	(Chinese Taipei) Chen Jia-man	27 July 1999	1.67 m (5 ft 6 in)	57 kg (126 lb)	273 cm (107 in)	270 cm (110 in)
10	(Chinese Taipei) Chen Yu-chieh	13 November 2000	1.72 m (5 ft 8 in)	55 kg (121 lb)	295 cm (116 in)	288 cm (113 in)
11	(Chinese Taipei) Chiu Ya-hui (C)	4 April 1998	1.80 m (5 ft 11 in)	64 kg (141 lb)	300 cm (120 in)	290 cm (110 in)
12	(Chinese Taipei) Tsai Qin-yao	20 September 1998	1.76 m (5 ft 9 in)	71 kg (157 lb)	290 cm (110 in)	283 cm (111 in)
13	(Chinese Taipei) Liu Kuei-ling	28 January 1998	1.60 m (5 ft 3 in)	56 kg (123 lb)	275 cm (108 in)	285 cm (112 in)
14	(Chinese Taipei) Huang Man-ya	10 October 1999	1.78 m (5 ft 10 in)	56 kg (123 lb)	291 cm (115 in)	278 cm (109 in)
15	(Chinese Taipei) Wang Yu-han	3 September 2000	1.76 m (5 ft 9 in)	66 kg (146 lb)	292 cm (115 in)	285 cm (112 in)
17	(Chinese Taipei) Huang Chen-yu	26 February 1998	1.75 m (5 ft 9 in)	56 kg (123 lb)	300 cm (120 in)	290 cm (110 in)
18	(Chinese Taipei) Wu Sin-yu	6 February 2000	1.56 m (5 ft 1 in)	53 kg (117 lb)	265 cm (104 in)	258 cm (102 in)
19	(Chinese Taipei) Lee Yun-shiou	11 June 2000	1.70 m (5 ft 7 in)	60 kg (130 lb)	270 cm (110 in)	255 cm (100 in)

=== Malaysia ===
The following is the roster of the Malaysian national team which will compete as a club in the 2016 Asian Women's Club Volleyball Championship.

Head coach: (Malaysia) Dato' Moh Wung Ming

No.	Name	Date of birth	Height	Weight	Spike	Block
1	(Malaysia) Low Mei Cing	17 January 1996	1.83 m (6 ft 0 in)	70 kg (150 lb)	290 cm (110 in)	288 cm (113 in)
2	(Malaysia) Tina Tiong	10 July 1996	1.64 m (5 ft 5 in)	53 kg (117 lb)	260 cm (100 in)	255 cm (100 in)
3	(Malaysia) Maida Song	22 March 2001	1.70 m (5 ft 7 in)	55 kg (121 lb)	260 cm (100 in)	255 cm (100 in)
4	(Malaysia) Mae Tasha	13 August 2001	1.75 m (5 ft 9 in)	60 kg (130 lb)	280 cm (110 in)	275 cm (108 in)
5	(Malaysia) Wong Wee Yan	29 May 1996	1.70 m (5 ft 7 in)	52 kg (115 lb)	280 cm (110 in)	275 cm (108 in)
6	(Malaysia) Ting Hui Chin	12 March 1999	1.56 m (5 ft 1 in)	45 kg (99 lb)	250 cm (98 in)	245 cm (96 in)
7	(Malaysia) Chiu Hua Yun	1 March 1997	1.67 m (5 ft 6 in)	55 kg (121 lb)	282 cm (111 in)	276 cm (109 in)
8	(Malaysia) Ngin Jia Ning	12 February 2000	1.83 m (6 ft 0 in)	65 kg (143 lb)	290 cm (110 in)	288 cm (113 in)
9	(Malaysia) Yii Chii Hui	21 December 1996	1.70 m (5 ft 7 in)	62 kg (137 lb)	280 cm (110 in)	277 cm (109 in)
10	(Malaysia) Ching Hui Ming	6 December 1997	1.68 m (5 ft 6 in)	55 kg (121 lb)	265 cm (104 in)	263 cm (104 in)
11	(Malaysia) Tang Ling Hui	23 February 1998	1.75 m (5 ft 9 in)	70 kg (150 lb)	280 cm (110 in)	277 cm (109 in)
12	(Malaysia) Wong Pei Shien	28 November 1989	1.68 m (5 ft 6 in)	60 kg (130 lb)	273 cm (107 in)	268 cm (106 in)
13	(Malaysia) Mandy Song	9 June 1999	1.67 m (5 ft 6 in)	59 kg (130 lb)	262 cm (103 in)	258 cm (102 in)
14	(Malaysia) Mable Song	24 March 1997	1.73 m (5 ft 8 in)	60 kg (130 lb)	265 cm (104 in)	260 cm (100 in)
15	(Malaysia) H'ng Lee Teng	1 August 1999	1.75 m (5 ft 9 in)	63 kg (139 lb)	268 cm (106 in)	265 cm (104 in)
16	(Malaysia) Ariffin Nuraini	14 June 1994	1.69 m (5 ft 7 in)	64 kg (141 lb)	280 cm (110 in)	275 cm (108 in)
18	(Malaysia) Law Feng Nie (C)	18 March 1994	1.68 m (5 ft 6 in)	60 kg (130 lb)	275 cm (108 in)	270 cm (110 in)
19	(Malaysia) Shannon Lee	10 February 1997	1.65 m (5 ft 5 in)	45 kg (99 lb)	255 cm (100 in)	260 cm (100 in)
