= 2024 Asian Women's Club Volleyball Championship =

- Official logo

Tournament details
- Host country: Thailand
- City: Nakhon Ratchasima
- Dates: 22–29 September 2024
- Teams: 8 (from 1 confederation)
- Venue: 1 (in 1 host city)

Final positions
- Champions: (Japan) NEC Red Rockets (2nd title)
- Runners-up: (Vietnam) LP Bank Ninh Bình
- Third place: (Thailand) Nakhon Ratchasima QminC
- Fourth place: (Kazakhstan) Kuanysh

Tournament awards
- MVP: (Japan) Yoshino Sato
- Best Setter: (Japan) Shiori Tsukada
- Best OH: (Thailand) Onuma Sittirak; (Thailand) Seetaloed Warisara
- Best MB: (Japan) Haruyo Shimamura; (United States) Markenzie Benoit
- Best OPP: (Vietnam) Nguyễn Thị Bích Tuyền
- Best Libero: (Japan) Sayaka Daikuzono

Tournament statistics
- Matches played: 24
- Attendance: 7,900 (329 per match)

The 2024 Asian Women's Club Volleyball Championship was the 24th edition of the Asian Women's Club Volleyball Championship, an annual international women's volleyball club tournament organized by the Asian Volleyball Confederation (AVC) with Thailand Volleyball Association (TVA).

The tournament took place in Nakhon Ratchasima, Thailand, from 22 to 29 September 2024. The top two club team qualified for the 2024 FIVB Volleyball Women's Club World Championship.

== Qualification ==
Following the AVC regulations, the maximum of 12 teams in all AVC events will be selected by:

- 1 team for the Host team
- 3 teams based on the final standing of the previous edition.
- 5 teams from the best-ranked team of each zone from the previous Asian Club Championship. In case no team from a zone participated in the previous championship, the world ranking will be considered.
- 2 teams based on FIVB NF world ranking (excluding host country).
- 1 wildcard from the hosting NF

=== Qualified associations ===
Event(s)		Dates	Location	Berths	Qualifier(s)
Host country		—N/a		1	Thailand
2023 Asian Championship		25 April – 2 May 2023	(Vietnam) Vĩnh Yên	3	Vietnam; ~~Thailand~~; ~~China~~; ~~Chinese Taipei~~; Japan; Kazakhstan
Direct zonal wildcards	EAVA	11 September 2024	(Thailand) Bangkok	1	Hong Kong
Direct zonal wildcards	CAVA	11 September 2024	(Thailand) Bangkok	1	Iran
Direct zonal wildcards	SEAVA	11 September 2024	(Thailand) Bangkok	1	Philippines

== Squads ==
=== Participating teams ===
The following teams participated for the tournament.

Association	Team	Domestic league standing
Hong Kong	Kwai Tsing	
Iran	Saipa Tehran	2023–24 Iranian Women's Volleyball League champions
Japan	NEC Red Rockets	2023–24 V.League Division 1 Women champions
Kazakhstan	Kuanysh	2022–23 Kazakhstan Women's National League third-place
Philippines	Monolith Sky Risers (Note: Collegiate team of the National University playing as a club team.)	2024 UAAP women's volleyball tournament champions
Thailand	Nakhon Ratchasima QminC	2023–24 Women's Volleyball Thailand League champions
Vietnam	LP Bank Ninh Bình	2023 Women's Volleyball Vietnam League champions
Vietnam	Đức Giang Chemical	2023 Women's Volleyball Vietnam League runners-up

== Venue ==
All matches
Nakhon Ratchasima, Thailand
Korat Chatchai Hall
Capacity: 5,000
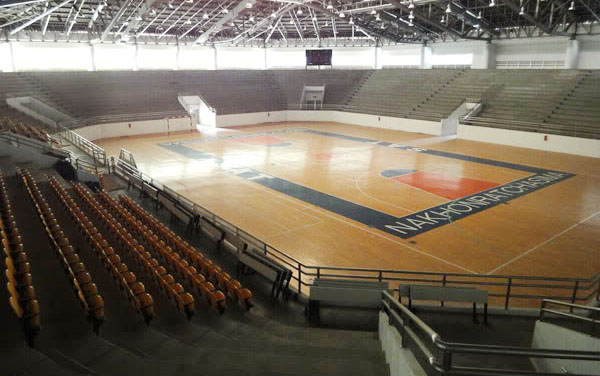

== Pool standing procedure ==
1. Total number of victories (matches won, matches lost)
2. In the event of a tie, the following first tiebreaker will apply: The teams will be ranked by the most point gained per match as follows:
  - Match won 3–0 or 3–1: 3 points for the winner, 0 points for the loser
  - Match won 3–2: 2 points for the winner, 1 point for the loser
  - Match forfeited: 3 points for the winner, 0 points (0–25, 0–25, 0–25) for the loser
3. If teams are still tied after examining the number of victories and points gained, then the AVC will examine the results in order to break the tie in the following order:
  - Set quotient: if two or more teams are tied on the number of points gained, they will be ranked by the quotient resulting from the division of the number of all set won by the number of all sets lost.
  - Points quotient: if the tie persists based on the set quotient, the teams will be ranked by the quotient resulting from the division of all points scored by the total of points lost during all sets.
  - If the tie persists based on the point quotient, the tie will be broken based on the team that won the match of the Round Robin Phase between the tied teams. When the tie in point quotient is between three or more teams, these teams ranked taking into consideration only the matches involving the teams in question.

== Preliminary round ==
- All times are Thailand Standard Time (UTC+07:00).

=== Pool A ===
Pos	Team	Pld	W	L	Pts	SW	SL	SR	SPW	SPL	SPR	Qualification
1	(Kazakhstan) Kuanysh	3	3	0	8	9	2	4.500	250	214	1.168	Quarterfinals
2	(Thailand) Nakhon Ratchasima QminC	3	2	1	7	8	4	2.000	264	226	1.168	Quarterfinals
3	(Vietnam) Đức Giang Chemical	3	1	2	3	4	6	0.667	214	217	0.986	Quarterfinals
4	(Hong Kong) Kwai Tsing	3	0	3	0	0	9	0.000	154	225	0.684	Quarterfinals

Source: Bulletin No.4

Date	Time		Score		Set 1	Set 2	Set 3	Set 4	Set 5	Total	Report
22 Sep	10:00	Kuanysh (Kazakhstan)	3–0	(Vietnam) Đức Giang Chemical	25–17	25–22	25–20			75–59	Report
22 Sep	19:00	Nakhon Ratchasima QminC (Thailand)	3–0	(Hong Kong) Kwai Tsing	25–16	25–18	25–12			75–46	Report
23 Sep	16:00	Nakhon Ratchasima QminC (Thailand)	2–3	(Kazakhstan) Kuanysh	8–25	24–26	25–12	25–22	13–15	95–100	Report
23 Sep	19:00	Kwai Tsing (Hong Kong)	0–3	(Vietnam) Đức Giang Chemical	17–25	15–25	16–25			48–75	Report
24 Sep	16:00	Đức Giang Chemical (Vietnam)	1–3	(Thailand) Nakhon Ratchasima QminC	23–25	25–19	16–25	16–25		80–94	Report
24 Sep	19:00	Kuanysh (Kazakhstan)	3–0	(Hong Kong) Kwai Tsing	25–21	25–21	25–18			75–60	Report

=== Pool B ===
Pos	Team	Pld	W	L	Pts	SW	SL	SR	SPW	SPL	SPR	Qualification
1	(Japan) NEC Red Rockets	3	3	0	9	9	1	9.000	251	180	1.394	Quarterfinals
2	(Vietnam) LP Bank Ninh Bình	3	2	1	6	6	4	1.500	221	208	1.063	Quarterfinals
3	(Philippines) Monolith Sky Risers	3	1	2	3	3	7	0.429	206	231	0.892	Quarterfinals
4	(Iran) Saipa Tehran	3	0	3	0	3	9	0.333	227	288	0.788	Quarterfinals

Source: Bulletin No.4

Date	Time		Score		Set 1	Set 2	Set 3	Set 4	Set 5	Total	Report
22 Sep	13:00	Saipa Tehran (Iran)	1–3	(Philippines) Monolith Sky Risers	19–25	18–25	25–19	18–25		80–94	Report
22 Sep	16:00	NEC Red Rockets (Japan)	3–0	(Vietnam) LP Bank Ninh Bình	25–15	25–21	25–18			75–54	Report
23 Sep	10:00	NEC Red Rockets (Japan)	3–1	(Iran) Saipa Tehran	25–27	25–12	25–18	25–14		100–71	Report
23 Sep	13:00	LP Bank Ninh Bình (Vietnam)	3–0	(Philippines) Monolith Sky Risers	25–15	25–20	25–22			75–57	Report
24 Sep	10:00	Saipa Tehran (Iran)	1–3	(Vietnam) LP Bank Ninh Bình	16–25	16–25	25–17	19–25		76–92	Report
24 Sep	13:00	Monolith Sky Risers (Philippines)	0–3	(Japan) NEC Red Rockets	24–26	13–25	18–25			55–76	Report

== Final round ==
- All times are Thailand Standard Time (UTC+07:00).

Quarterfinals
26 September
(Kazakhstan) Kuanysh	3
(Iran) Saipa Tehran	1
26 September
(Vietnam) LP Bank Ninh Bình	3
(Vietnam) Đức Giang Chemical	0
26 September
(Japan) NEC Red Rockets	3
(Hong Kong) Kwai Tsing	0
26 September
(Thailand) Nakhon Ratchasima QminC	3
(Philippines) Monolith Sky Risers	2

Semifinals
27 September
(Kazakhstan) Kuanysh	1
(Vietnam) LP Bank Ninh Bình	3
27 September
(Japan) NEC Red Rockets	3
(Thailand) Nakhon Ratchasima QminC	2

Final
29 September
(Vietnam) LP Bank Ninh Bình	0
(Japan) NEC Red Rockets	3
3rd place match
29 September
(Kazakhstan) Kuanysh	0
(Thailand) Nakhon Ratchasima QminC	3

5th–8th semifinals
27 September
(Iran) Saipa Tehran	0
(Vietnam) Đức Giang Chemical	3
27 September
(Hong Kong) Kwai Tsing	0
(Philippines) Monolith Sky Risers	3

5th place match
28 September
(Vietnam) Đức Giang Chemical	3
(Philippines) Monolith Sky Risers	0
7th place match
28 September
(Iran) Saipa Tehran	3
(Hong Kong) Kwai Tsing	0

=== Quarterfinals ===
Date	Time		Score		Set 1	Set 2	Set 3	Set 4	Set 5	Total	Report
26 Sep	10:00	Kuanysh (Kazakhstan)	3–1	(Iran) Saipa Tehran	24–26	25–15	25–18	25–12		99–71	Report
26 Sep	13:00	LP Bank Ninh Bình (Vietnam)	3–0	(Vietnam) Đức Giang Chemical	25–17	25–16	25–18			75–51	Report
26 Sep	16:00	Nakhon Ratchasima QminC (Thailand)	3–2	(Philippines) Monolith Sky Risers	25–13	25–21	20–25	22–25	15–5	107–89	Report
26 Sep	19:00	NEC Red Rockets (Japan)	3–0	(Hong Kong) Kwai Tsing	25–9	25–10	25–11			75–30	Report

=== 5th–8th semifinals ===
Date	Time		Score		Set 1	Set 2	Set 3	Set 4	Set 5	Total	Report
27 Sep	10:00	Saipa Tehran (Iran)	0–3	(Vietnam) Đức Giang Chemical	16–25	11–25	25–27			52–77	Report
27 Sep	13:00	Kwai Tsing (Hong Kong)	0–3	(Philippines) Monolith Sky Risers	16–25	21–25	22–25			59–75	Report

=== Semifinals ===
Date	Time		Score		Set 1	Set 2	Set 3	Set 4	Set 5	Total	Report
27 Sep	16:00	NEC Red Rockets (Japan)	3–2	(Thailand) Nakhon Ratchasima QminC	23–25	22–25	25–17	25–19	15–10	110–96	Report
27 Sep	19:00	Kuanysh (Kazakhstan)	1–3	(Vietnam) LP Bank Ninh Bình	23–25	25–27	25–18	22–25		95–95	Report

=== 7th place match ===
Date	Time		Score		Set 1	Set 2	Set 3	Set 4	Set 5	Total	Report
28 Sep	14:00	Saipa Tehran (Iran)	3–0	(Hong Kong) Kwai Tsing	25–20	25–20	25–17			75–57	Report

=== 5th place match ===
Date	Time		Score		Set 1	Set 2	Set 3	Set 4	Set 5	Total	Report
28 Sep	17:00	Đức Giang Chemical (Vietnam)	3–0	(Philippines) Monolith Sky Risers	25–18	25–15	25–10			75–43	Report

=== 3rd place match ===
Date	Time		Score		Set 1	Set 2	Set 3	Set 4	Set 5	Total	Report
29 Sep	14:00	Kuanysh (Kazakhstan)	0–3	(Thailand) Nakhon Ratchasima QminC	22–25	18–25	21–25			61–75	Report

=== Final ===
Date	Time		Score		Set 1	Set 2	Set 3	Set 4	Set 5	Total	Report
29 Sep	17:00	LP Bank Ninh Bình (Vietnam)	0–3	(Japan) NEC Red Rockets	16–25	15–25	17–25			48–75	Report

== Final standing ==
Rank	Team
1st place, gold medalist(s)	(Japan) NEC Red Rockets
2nd place, silver medalist(s)	(Vietnam) LP Bank Ninh Bình
3rd place, bronze medalist(s)	(Thailand) Nakhon Ratchasima QminC
4	(Kazakhstan) Kuanysh
5	(Vietnam) Đức Giang Chemical
6	(Philippines) Monolith Sky Risers
7	(Iran) Saipa Tehran
8	(Hong Kong) Kwai Tsing

Qualified for the 2024 Club World Championship

2024 Asian Women's Club champions
(Japan)
NEC Red Rockets
2nd title

14–woman roster
Haruyo Shimamura, Shiori Tsukada, Ai Hirota, Yuka Sawada (c), Moeka Kinoe, Kasumi Nojima, Riko Fujii, Tsukasa Nakagawa, Misaki Yamauchi, Yukiko Wada, Lorrayna Marys, Sayaka Daikuzono, Yoshino Sato, Haruko Sasaki
Head coach
Kaneko Takayuki

== Awards ==
- Most Valuable Player

Yoshino Sato (JPN) (NEC Red Rockets)

- Best Setter

Shiori Tsukada (JPN) (NEC Red Rockets)

- Best Outside Spikers

Onuma Sittirak (THA) (Nakhon Ratchasima QminC)
Warisara Seetaloed (THA) (LP Bank Ninh Bình)

- Best Middle Blockers

Haruyo Shimamura (JPN) (NEC Red Rockets)
Markenzie Benoit (USA) (Nakhon Ratchasima QminC)

- Best Opposite Spiker

Nguyễn Thị Bích Tuyền (VIE) (LP Bank Ninh Bình)

- Best Libero

Sayaka Daikuzono (JPN) (NEC Red Rockets)

== See also ==
- 2024 Asian Men's Club Volleyball Championship
