= 2016 Asian Women's Club Volleyball Championship =

2016 Asian Women's Club Championship

Tournament details
- Host country: Philippines
- Dates: September 3–11, 2016
- Teams: 13
- Venue: 1 (in 1 host city)

Final positions
- Champions: (Japan) NEC Red Rockets (1st title)

Tournament awards
- MVP: (Japan) Sarina Koga

The 2016 Asian Women's Club Volleyball Championship was the 17th staging of the AVC Club Championships which was hosted by the Philippines. The tournament was held at the Alonte Sports Arena in Biñan, Laguna. It was held from September 3 to September 11, 2016.

The tournament was organized by the Philippine Super Liga and the Larong Volleyball sa Pilipinas, Inc. The tournament serves as the 2nd Asian tournament which was hosted by the LVPI following the Asian Under-23 Championships hosting in 2015.

== Pools composition ==
The drawing of lots of the teams, which determined the composition of the pools for the Asian Women's Club Championship, was conducted on April 27, 2016, at the Foton Quezon Avenue showroom in Quezon City.

- The Philippines as host chose their representatives to be grouped in Pool A. They also chose Vietnam to be in this group.

Pool A	Pool B	Pool C	Pool D
Philippines (Host); Vietnam (7th); Hong Kong	Thailand (1st); North Korea (6th); Iran	Japan (2nd); Kazakhstan (5th); Indonesia	China (3rd); Chinese Taipei (4th); Malaysia; ~~Turkmenistan~~*

* Withdrew

== Pool standing procedure ==
The following procedures shall be followed to determine the ranking of teams in a pool:

1. Number of matches won
2. Match points
3. Sets ratio
4. Points ratio
5. Result of the last match between the tied teams

Match won 3–0 or 3–1: 3 match points for the winner, 0 match points for the loser
Match won 3–2: 2 match points for the winner, 1 match point for the loser

== Preliminary round ==
- All times are in Philippine Standard Time (UTC+08:00).

=== Pool A ===
Pos	Team	Pld	W	L	Pts	SW	SL	SR	SPW	SPL	SPR	Qualification
1	(Vietnam) Thông tin LienVietPostBank	2	2	0	5	6	3	2.000	202	161	1.255	Classification 1st-8th
2	(Philippines) Foton Pilipinas	2	1	1	4	5	3	1.667	163	148	1.101	Classification 1st-8th
3	(Hong Kong) Kwai Tsing	2	0	2	0	1	6	0.167	117	173	0.676	Classification 9th-12th

Date	Time		Score		Set 1	Set 2	Set 3	Set 4	Set 5	Total	Report
3 Sep	14:30	Foton Pilipinas (Philippines)	3–0	(Hong Kong) Kwai Tsing	25–20	25–14	25–10			75–44	Report
4 Sep	14:00	Thông tin LVPB (Vietnam)	3–2	(Philippines) Foton Pilipinas	25–18	19–25	20–25	25–12	15–8	104–88	Report
5 Sep	11:30	Kwai Tsing (Hong Kong)	1–3	(Vietnam) Thông tin LVPB	14–25	25–23	16–25	18–25		73–98	Report

=== Pool B ===
Pos	Team	Pld	W	L	Pts	SW	SL	SR	SPW	SPL	SPR	Qualification
1	(Thailand) Bangkok Glass	2	2	0	6	6	1	6.000	171	108	1.583	Classification 1st-8th
2	(Iran) Sarmayeh Bank	2	1	1	3	3	4	0.750	146	167	0.874	Classification 1st-8th
3	(North Korea) April 25	2	0	2	0	2	6	0.333	156	198	0.788	Classification 9th-12th

Date	Time		Score		Set 1	Set 2	Set 3	Set 4	Set 5	Total	Report
3 Sep	19:00	April 25 (North Korea)	1–3	(Iran) Sarmayeh Bank	28–26	24–26	20–25	20–25		92–102	Report
4 Sep	16:30	Bangkok Glass (Thailand)	3–1	(North Korea) April 25	25–13	25–10	21–25	25–16		96–64	Report
5 Sep	16:30	Sarmayeh Bank (Iran)	0–3	(Thailand) Bangkok Glass	17–25	12–25	15–25			44–75	Report

=== Pool C ===
Pos	Team	Pld	W	L	Pts	SW	SL	SR	SPW	SPL	SPR	Qualification
1	(Japan) NEC Red Rockets	2	2	0	6	6	0	MAX	150	100	1.500	Classification 1st-8th
2	(Kazakhstan) Altay Oskemen	2	1	1	3	3	3	1.000	127	121	1.050	Classification 1st-8th
3	(Indonesia) Jakarta Electric PLN	2	0	2	0	0	6	0.000	94	150	0.627	Classification 9th-12th

Date	Time		Score		Set 1	Set 2	Set 3	Set 4	Set 5	Total	Report
3 Sep	17:00	Jakarta Electric PLN (Indonesia)	0–3	(Kazakhstan) Altay Oskemen	12–25	17–25	17–25			46–75	Report
4 Sep	11:30	NEC Red Rockets (Japan)	3–0	(Indonesia) Jakarta Electric PLN	25–16	25–15	25–17			75–48	Report
5 Sep	14:00	Altay Oskemen (Kazakhstan)	0–3	(Japan) NEC Red Rockets	16–25	17–25	19–25			52–75	Report

=== Pool D ===
Pos	Team	Pld	W	L	Pts	SW	SL	SR	SPW	SPL	SPR	Qualification
1	(China) Ba'yi Shenzhen	2	2	0	6	6	0	MAX	150	81	1.852	Classification 1st-8th
2	(Chinese Taipei) T. Grand	2	1	1	3	3	3	1.000	117	133	0.880	Classification 1st-8th
3	Malaysia	2	0	2	0	0	6	0.000	97	150	0.647	Classification 9th-12th

Date	Time		Score		Set 1	Set 2	Set 3	Set 4	Set 5	Total	Report
3 Sep	11:30	T. Grand (Chinese Taipei)	3–0	Malaysia	25–15	25–22	25–21			75–58	Report
4 Sep	18:30	T. Grand (Chinese Taipei)	0–3	(China) Ba'yi Shenzhen	12–25	11–25	19–25			42–75	Report
5 Sep	18:30	Ba'yi Shenzhen (China)	3–0	Malaysia	25–10	25–11	25–18			75–39	Report

== Classification 9th-12th ==
=== Pool G ===
Pos	Team	Pld	W	L	Pts	SW	SL	SR	SPW	SPL	SPR	Qualification
1	(Indonesia) Jakarta Electric PLN	1	1	0	3	3	0	MAX	75	39	1.923	Classification 9th-10th
2	(Hong Kong) Kwai Tsing	1	0	1	0	0	3	0.000	39	75	0.520	

Date	Time		Score		Set 1	Set 2	Set 3	Set 4	Set 5	Total	Report
6 Sep	09:30	Kwai Tsing (Hong Kong)	0–3	(Indonesia) Jakarta Electric PLN	12–25	15–25	12–25			39–75	Report

=== Pool H ===
Pos	Team	Pld	W	L	Pts	SW	SL	SR	SPW	SPL	SPR	Qualification
1	(North Korea) April 25	1	1	0	3	3	0	MAX	75	33	2.273	Classification 9th-10th
2	Malaysia	1	0	1	0	0	3	0.000	33	75	0.440	

Date	Time		Score		Set 1	Set 2	Set 3	Set 4	Set 5	Total	Report
7 Sep	09:30	April 25 (North Korea)	3–0	Malaysia	25–9	25–14	25–10			75–33	Report

=== 11th place ===
Date	Time		Score		Set 1	Set 2	Set 3	Set 4	Set 5	Total	Report
9 Sep	09:30	Kwai Tsing (Hong Kong)	3–1	Malaysia	23–25	25–18	26–24	25–19		99–86	Report

=== 9th place ===
Date	Time		Score		Set 1	Set 2	Set 3	Set 4	Set 5	Total	Report
10 Sep	09:30	Jakarta Electric PLN (Indonesia)	1–3	(North Korea) April 25	25–21	13–25	9–25	21–25		68–96	Report

== Classification 1st-8th ==
- All times are in Philippine Standard Time (UTC+08:00).

=== Pool E ===
Pos	Team	Pld	W	L	Pts	SW	SL	SR	SPW	SPL	SPR	Qualification
1	(Japan) NEC Red Rockets	3	3	0	9	9	0	MAX	225	134	1.679	Final round
2	(Kazakhstan) Altay Oskemen	3	2	1	6	6	3	2.000	204	198	1.030	Final round
3	(Vietnam) Thông tin LienVietPostBank	3	1	2	2	3	8	0.375	210	238	0.882	Final round
4	(Philippines) Foton Pilipinas	3	0	3	1	2	9	0.222	187	256	0.730	Final round

Date	Time		Score		Set 1	Set 2	Set 3	Set 4	Set 5	Total	Report
6 Sep	11:30	Thông tin LVPB (Vietnam)	0–3	(Kazakhstan) Altay Oskemen	21–25	16–25	22–25			59–75	Report
6 Sep	13:30	NEC Red Rockets (Japan)	3–0	(Philippines) Foton Pilipinas	25–13	25–7	25–15			75–35	Report
7 Sep	11:30	Thông tin LVPB (Vietnam)	0–3	(Japan) NEC Red Rockets	15–25	19–25	13–25			47–75	Report
7 Sep	13:30	Foton Pilipinas (Philippines)	0–3	(Kazakhstan) Altay Oskemen	25–27	18–25	21–25			64–77	Report

=== Pool F ===
Pos	Team	Pld	W	L	Pts	SW	SL	SR	SPW	SPL	SPR	Qualification
1	(China) Ba'yi Shenzhen	3	3	0	8	9	2	4.500	251	192	1.307	Final round
2	(Thailand) Bangkok Glass	3	2	1	7	8	3	2.667	249	176	1.415	Final round
3	(Iran) Sarmayeh Bank	3	1	2	3	3	6	0.500	170	192	0.885	Final round
4	(Chinese Taipei) T. Grand	3	0	3	0	0	9	0.000	115	175	0.657	Final round

Date	Time		Score		Set 1	Set 2	Set 3	Set 4	Set 5	Total	Report
6 Sep	16:00	Ba'yi Shenzhen (China)	3–0	(Iran) Sarmayeh Bank	25–18	25–19	25–14			75–51	Report
6 Sep	18:30	Bangkok Glass (Thailand)	3–0	(Chinese Taipei) T. Grand	25–10	25–10	25–11			75–31	Report
7 Sep	16:00	Sarmayeh Bank (Iran)	3–0	(Chinese Taipei) T. Grand	25–14	25–16	25–12			75–42	Report
7 Sep	18:30	Bangkok Glass (Thailand)	2–3	(China) Ba'yi Shenzhen	25–16	20–25	21–25	25–20	8–15	99–101	Report

== Final round ==
Quarterfinals
9 Sep – Biñan, Laguna
(Japan) NEC Red Rockets	3
(Chinese Taipei) T. Grand	0
9 Sep – Biñan, Laguna
(Thailand) Bangkok Glass	3
(Vietnam) Thông tin LVPB	0
9 Sep – Biñan, Laguna
(China) Ba'yi Shenzhen	3
(Philippines) Foton Pilipinas	0
9 Sep – Biñan, Laguna
(Kazakhstan) Altay Oskemen	3
(Iran) Sarmayeh Bank	1

Semifinals
10 Sep – Biñan, Laguna
(Japan) NEC Red Rockets	3
(Thailand) Bangkok Glass	2
10 Sep – Biñan, Laguna
(China) Ba'yi Shenzhen	3
(Kazakhstan) Altay Oskemen	1

Final
11 Sep – Biñan, Laguna
(Japan) NEC Red Rockets	3
(China) Ba'yi Shenzhen	0
3rd place
11 Sep – Biñan, Laguna
(Thailand) Bangkok Glass	3
(Kazakhstan) Altay Oskemen	2

5th–8th places
10 Sep – Biñan, Laguna
(Chinese Taipei) T. Grand	0
(Vietnam) Thông tin LVPB	3
10 Sep – Biñan, Laguna
(Philippines) Foton Pilipinas	1
(Iran) Sarmayeh Bank	3

5th place
11 Sep – Biñan, Laguna
(Vietnam) Thông tin LVPB	0
(Iran) Sarmayeh Bank	3
7th place
11 Sep – Biñan, Laguna
(Philippines) Foton Pilipinas	3
(Chinese Taipei) T. Grand	0

=== Quarterfinals ===
}

Date	Time		Score		Set 1	Set 2	Set 3	Set 4	Set 5	Total	Report
9 Sep	11:30	NEC Red Rockets (Japan)	3–0	(Chinese Taipei) T. Grand	25–6	25–23	25–13			75–42	Report
9 Sep	13:30	Ba'yi Shenzhen (China)	3–0	(Philippines) Foton Pilipinas	25–16	25–18	25–14			75–48	Report
9 Sep	16:00	Altay Oskemen (Kazakhstan)	3–1	(Iran) Sarmayeh Bank	20–25	25–15	25–23	25–14		95–77	Report
9 Sep	18:30	Bangkok Glass (Thailand)	3–0	(Vietnam) Thông tin LVPB	25–17	25–18	25–15			75–50	Report

=== 5th-8th Semifinals ===
Date	Time		Score		Set 1	Set 2	Set 3	Set 4	Set 5	Total	Report
10 Sep	11:30	T. Grand (Chinese Taipei)	0–3	(Vietnam) Thông tin LVPB	14–25	15–25	14–25			43–75	Report
10 Sep	13:30	Foton Pilipinas (Philippines)	1–3	(Iran) Sarmayeh Bank	18–25	21–25	25–12	22–25		86–87	Report

=== Semifinals ===
Date	Time		Score		Set 1	Set 2	Set 3	Set 4	Set 5	Total	Report
10 Sep	16:00	Ba'yi Shenzhen (China)	3–1	(Kazakhstan) Altay Oskemen	25–20	12–25	25–12	25–23		87–80	Report
10 Sep	18:30	NEC Red Rockets (Japan)	3–2	(Thailand) Bangkok Glass	22–25	25–19	21–25	25–20	15–7	108–96	Report

=== 7th place ===
Date	Time		Score		Set 1	Set 2	Set 3	Set 4	Set 5	Total	Report
11 Sep	12:00	Foton Pilipinas (Philippines)	3–0	(Chinese Taipei) T. Grand	25–17	30–28	25–23			80–68	Report

=== 5th place ===
Date	Time		Score		Set 1	Set 2	Set 3	Set 4	Set 5	Total	Report
11 Sep	09:30	Thông tin LVPB (Vietnam)	0–3	(Iran) Sarmayeh Bank	23–25	17–25	23–25			63–75	Report

=== 3rd place ===
Date	Time		Score		Set 1	Set 2	Set 3	Set 4	Set 5	Total	Report
11 Sep	14:30	Bangkok Glass (Thailand)	3–2	(Kazakhstan) Altay Oskemen	22–25	23–25	25–19	25–21	15–6	110–96	Report

=== Final ===
Date	Time		Score		Set 1	Set 2	Set 3	Set 4	Set 5	Total	Report
11 Sep	17:00	Ba'yi Shenzhen (China)	0–3	(Japan) NEC Red Rockets	23–25	19–25	21–25			63–75	Report

== Final standing ==
Rank	Team
1st place, gold medalist(s)	(Japan) NEC Red Rockets
2nd place, silver medalist(s)	(China) Ba'yi Shenzhen
3rd place, bronze medalist(s)	(Thailand) Bangkok Glass
4	(Kazakhstan) Altay Oskemen
5	(Iran) Sarmayeh Bank
6	(Vietnam) Thông tin LienVietPostBank
7	(Philippines) Foton Pilipinas
8	(Chinese Taipei) T. Grand
9	(North Korea) April 25
10	(Indonesia) Jakarta Electric PLN
11	(Hong Kong) Kwai Tsing
12	Malaysia

Qualified for the 2017 FIVB Volleyball Women's Club World Championship

2016 Asian Women's Club Champions

1st title

Team Roster
Sarina Koga, Kaname Yamaguchi, Kana Ono, Akari Oumi (c), Haruyo Shimamura, Miku Torigoe, Rina Sho, Sayaka Iwasaki, Kaori Ueno, Ayana Oyama, Naoko Yataka, Nami Sagawa, Mizuki Yanakita, Yuna Okuyama, Sayaka Shinohara, Nanami Hirose
Head coach
Akinori Yamada

== Awards ==
- Most Valuable Player

(Japan) Sarina Koga (NEC Red Rockets)

- Best Setter

(Thailand) Pornpun Guedpard (Bangkok Glass)

- Best Outside Spikers

(Thailand) Wilavan Apinyapong (Bangkok Glass)
(China) Liu Yanhan (Ba'yi Shenzhen)

- Best Middle Blockers

(Japan) Kana Ono (NEC Red Rockets)
(Thailand) Pleumjit Thinkaow (Bangkok Glass)

- Best Opposite Spiker

(Japan) Mizuki Yanagita (NEC Red Rockets)

- Best Libero

(Thailand) Tikamporn Changkeaw (Bangkok Glass)
