= Mio Satō =

Japanese volleyball player

Personal information
- Full name: Mio Satō
- Nickname: Mio
- Born: February 12, 1993 (age 33); Yamagata, Yamagata, Japan
- Hometown: Yamagata, Japan
- Height: 1.53 m (5 ft 0 in)
- Weight: 54 kg (119 lb)
- Spike: 250 cm (98 in)
- Block: 240 cm (94 in)

Volleyball information
- Position: Libero
- Current club: NEC Red Rockets
- Number: 17

National team
| Japan |

Mio Satō (佐藤 澪, Satō Mio; born 12 February 1993) is a Japanese volleyball player who plays for the NEC Red Rockets. She also played for the Japan women's national volleyball team.

== Career ==
Satō was born in Yamagata City, Yamagata Prefecture. She became a volleyball player at 7 years old, and played as Libero at 13 years old.

While attending the Yamagata Municipal Commercial High School, Her team won fifth place at the national highschool tournament. In April 2011 Satō joined Shokei Gakuin University, her team qualified National Sports Festival and Empress's Cup in October 2014.

On 31 October 2014 Toyota Auto Body Queenseis announced her joining. She is the first premier league player from Shokei Gakuin's alumnus.

On 6 April 2015 she was selected as a member of Japan women's national volleyball team, Satō competed 2015 FIVB Volleyball World Grand Prix and 2015 FIVB Volleyball Women's World Cup.

On 1 August 2019 NEC Red Rockets announced her joining the club.

== Clubs ==
- (Japan) Takiyama Sports Club
- (Japan) Yamagata Municipal Dairoku Junior High School
- (Japan) Yamagata Municipal Commercial High School
- (Japan) Shokei Gakuin University (2011-2015)
- (Japan) Toyota Auto Body Queenseis (2015-2018)
- (Japan) NEC Red Rockets (2019-)

== National team ==
- 2015 - 2015 FIVB Volleyball Women's World Cup (5th place)
