= 2018 VTV International Women's Volleyball Cup =

Tournament details
- Host country: Vietnam
- Dates: 4–11 August
- Teams: 8
- Venue: 1 (in 1 host city)

Final positions
- Champions: Vietnam (5th title)

Tournament awards
- MVP: (Vietnam) Trần Thị Thanh Thúy

The 2018 VTV Cup is the 15th staging of the international tournament. The tournament will held in Hà Tĩnh, Vietnam.

== Pool composition ==
Pool A	Pool B
Vietnam (Host) (China) Yunnan (Japan) HUE Kushiro Campus (Kazakhstan) Altay VC	Vietnam U20 (China) Sichuan; North Korea; Chinese Taipei

== Preliminary round ==
- All times are local: Vietnam Standard Time (UTC+07:00).

=== Group A ===
Pos	Team	Pld	W	L	Pts	SW	SL	SR	SPW	SPL	SPR	Qualification
1	Vietnam	3	3	0	9	9	0	MAX	226	141	1.603	Quarterfinals
2	(Kazakhstan) Altay VC	3	2	1	5	6	5	1.200	234	206	1.136	Quarterfinals
3	(China) Yunnan	3	1	2	4	5	6	0.833	232	209	1.110	Quarterfinals
4	(Japan) HUE Kushiro Campus	3	0	3	0	0	9	0.000	89	225	0.396	Quarterfinals

Date	Time		Score		Set 1	Set 2	Set 3	Set 4	Set 5	Total	Report
4 Aug	13:00	Altay VC (Kazakhstan)	3–0	(Japan) HUE Kushiro Campus	25–11	25–12	25–11			75–34	
4 Aug	20:00	Vietnam	3–0	(China) Yunnan	25–15	26–24	25–21			76–60	
5 Aug	18:00	Yunnan (China)	2–3	(Kazakhstan) Altay VC	18–25	15–25	25–13	26–24	13–15	97–102	
5 Aug	20:00	Vietnam	3–0	(Japan) HUE Kushiro Campus	25–8	25–7	25–9			75–24	
6 Aug	18:00	HUE Kushiro Campus (Japan)	0–3	(China) Yunnan	7–25	18–25	6–25			31–75	
6 Aug	20:00	Vietnam	3–0	(Kazakhstan) Altay VC	25–15	25–21	25–21			75–57	

=== Group B ===
Pos	Team	Pld	W	L	Pts	SW	SL	SR	SPW	SPL	SPR	Qualification
1	North Korea	3	2	1	6	6	3	2.000	208	177	1.175	Quarterfinals
2	(China) Sichuan	3	2	1	6	6	4	1.500	222	206	1.078	Quarterfinals
3	Chinese Taipei	3	2	1	6	6	4	1.500	231	218	1.060	Quarterfinals
4	Vietnam U20	3	0	3	0	2	9	0.222	206	266	0.774	Quarterfinals

Date	Time		Score		Set 1	Set 2	Set 3	Set 4	Set 5	Total	Report
4 Aug	15:00	Sichuan (China)	0–3	North Korea	17–25	21–25	17–25			55–75	
4 Aug	17:00	Vietnam U20	1–3	Chinese Taipei	23–25	16–25	26–24	20–25		85–99	
5 Aug	14:00	Chinese Taipei	0–3	(China) Sichuan	21–25	21–25	15–25			57–75	
5 Aug	16:00	Vietnam U20	0–3	North Korea	16–25	19–25	12–25			47–75	
6 Aug	14:00	North Korea	0–3	Chinese Taipei	20–25	18–25	20–25			58–75	
6 Aug	16:00	Vietnam U20	1–3	(China) Sichuan	25–17	12–25	17–25	20–25		74–92	

== Final round ==
- All times are local: Vietnam Standard Time (UTC+07:00).

Quarterfinals
8 August
Vietnam	3
Vietnam U20	0
8 August
(China) Yunnan	2
(China) Sichuan	3
8 August
(Kazakhstan) Altay VC	3
Chinese Taipei	0
8 August
(Japan) HUE Kushiro Campus	0
North Korea	3

Semifinals
9 August
Vietnam	3
(China) Sichuan	2
9 August
(Kazakhstan) Altay VC	1
North Korea	3

Final
11 August
Vietnam	3
North Korea	0
3rd place
11 August
(China) Sichuan	3
(Kazakhstan) Altay VC	2

5th–8th places
9 August
Vietnam U20	1
(China) Yunnan	3
9 August
Chinese Taipei	3
(Japan) HUE Kushiro Campus	0

5th place
10 August
Chinese Taipei	0
(China) Yunnan	3
7th place
10 August
Vietnam U20	3
(Japan) HUE Kushiro Campus	0

=== Quarterfinals ===
Date	Time		Score		Set 1	Set 2	Set 3	Set 4	Set 5	Total	Report
8 Aug	14:00	North Korea	3–0	(Japan) HUE Kushiro Campus	25–5	25–11	25–8			75–24	
8 Aug	16:00	Sichuan (China)	3–2	(China) Yunnan	16–25	13–25	25–20	25–19	15–7	94–96	
8 Aug	18:00	Altay VC (Kazakhstan)	3–0	Chinese Taipei	27–25	25–18	25–22			77–65	
8 Aug	20:00	Vietnam	3–0	Vietnam U20	25–22	25–5	25–18			75–45	

=== 5th–8th semifinals ===
Date	Time		Score		Set 1	Set 2	Set 3	Set 4	Set 5	Total	Report
9 Aug	14:00	HUE Kushiro Campus (Japan)	0–3	Chinese Taipei	10–25	14–25	18–25			42–75	
9 Aug	16:00	Yunnan (China)	3–1	Vietnam U20	25–18	21–25	27–25	25–16		98–84	

=== Semifinals ===
Date	Time		Score		Set 1	Set 2	Set 3	Set 4	Set 5	Total	Report
9 Aug	18:00	North Korea	3–1	(Kazakhstan) Altay VC	25–14	25–13	15–25	25–23		90–75	
9 Aug	20:00	Vietnam	3–2	(China) Sichuan	25–18	25–27	22–25	25–23	15–11	112–104	

=== 7th place ===
Date	Time		Score		Set 1	Set 2	Set 3	Set 4	Set 5	Total	Report
10 Aug	18:00	Vietnam U20	3–0	(Japan) HUE Kushiro Campus	25–14	25–15	25–10			75–39	

=== 5th place ===
Date	Time		Score		Set 1	Set 2	Set 3	Set 4	Set 5	Total	Report
10 Aug	16:00	Chinese Taipei	0–3	(China) Yunnan	21–25	21–25	19–25			61–75	

=== 3rd place ===
Date	Time		Score		Set 1	Set 2	Set 3	Set 4	Set 5	Total	Report
11 Aug	16:00	Altay VC (Kazakhstan)	2–3	(China) Sichuan	18–25	25–23	17–25	25–18	10–15	95–106	

=== Final ===
Date	Time		Score		Set 1	Set 2	Set 3	Set 4	Set 5	Total	Report
11 Aug	19:00	Vietnam	3–0	North Korea	25–14	25–19	25–15			75–48	

== Final standing ==
Rank	Team
1st place, gold medalist(s)	Vietnam
2nd place, silver medalist(s)	North Korea
3rd place, bronze medalist(s)	(China) Sichuan
4	(Kazakhstan) Altay VC
5	(China) Yunnan
6	Chinese Taipei
7	Vietnam U20
8	(Japan) HUE Kushiro Campus

2018 VTV International Women's Volleyball Cup

Vietnam
5th title

== Awards ==
- Most valuable player
  (Vietnam) Trần Thị Thanh Thúy
- Best outside spikers
  (Kazakhstan) Kristina Belova
  (North Korea) Son Hyang-mi
- Best setter
  (Vietnam) Nguyễn Linh Chi
- Best opposite spiker
  (Vietnam) Đặng Thị Kim Thanh
- Best middle blockers
  (China) Zhang Xiaoya
  (Vietnam) Bùi Thị Ngà
- Best libero
  (Vietnam) Nguyễn Thị Kim Liên
- Miss VTV Cup 2018
  (Vietnam) Đặng Thị Kim Thanh
