= Miyuki Akiyama =

Japanese volleyball player

Personal information
- Full name: Miyuki Akiyama
- Nickname: Aki
- Born: August 27, 1984 (age 42); Hitachiota, Ibaraki, Japan
- Height: 1.63 m (5 ft 4 in)
- Weight: 60 kg (130 lb)
- Spike: 290 cm (114 in)
- Block: 278 cm (109 in)

Volleyball information
- Position: Setter
- Current club: NEC Red Rockets
- Number: 10

Miyuki Akiyama (秋山美幸 Akiyama Miyuki, born August 27, 1984) is a Japanese volleyball player who plays for NEC Red Rockets. She is represented by the talent agency AT Production.

== Clubs ==
- Taiseijoshi High School → AoyamaGakuin Univ. → NEC Red Rockets (2007-)

== National team ==
- The 5th AVC Eastern Zonal Volleyball championships (2006)
- Japan Universiade national team (2007)
