= Yumiko Tsuzuki =

Japanese volleyball player

Personal information
- Full name: Yumiko Tsuzuki
- Nickname: Reg
- Born: May 11, 1983 (age 43) Okazaki, Aichi, Japan
- Height: 1.75 m (5 ft 9 in)
- Weight: 61 kg (134 lb)
- Spike: 295 cm (116 in)
- Block: 290 cm (114 in)

Volleyball information
- Position: Wing Spiker
- Current club: NEC Red Rockets
- Number: 3

National team
- Years: Team
- –: Japan

Yumiko Tsuzuki (都築有美子 Tsuzuki Yumiko born May 11, 1983, in Okazaki, Aichi) is a Japanese volleyball player who plays for NEC Red Rockets. She served as captain of Toyota Auto Body Queenseis between 2007 and 2009.

On 27 June 2013 NEC Red Rockets announced her joining.

== Profiles ==
- She became a volleyball player at 10 years old.
- Her nickname "Reg" is named after the Regulus which is the star of Leo.

== Clubs ==
- (Japan) OkazakiGakuen High School
- (Japan) Chukyo Univ.
- (Japan) Toyota Auto Body Queenseis (2006-2011)
- (Japan) NEC Red Rockets(2013-)

== Awards ==
=== Team ===
- 2008 Empress's Cup - Champion, with Toyota Auto Body.
