= Li Ying (volleyball, born 1979) =

Chinese volleyball player (born 1979)

Personal information
- Full name: 李颖
- Nationality: Chinese
- Born: 22 August 1979 (age 47); Dalian, Liaoning, China
- Height: 1.77 m (5 ft 10 in)

Volleyball information
- Position: libero

National team
1999 - 2002	China

Li Ying (Chinese: 李颖; born 22 August 1979) is a retired Chinese female volleyball player who played as a libero.

She was part of the China women's national volleyball team at the 2002 FIVB Volleyball Women's World Championship in Germany, and 2002 Asian Games.

== Clubs ==
- (China) Liaoning Huanyu (2002)
- (China) Bayi (Army) Keming Surface Industry (2002 - 2009)
