= Bayi Nanchang women's volleyball team =

Chinese women's volleyball team

Bayi Nanchang Women's Volleyball Team
- Full name: Bayi Nanchang Women's Volleyball Team 八一南昌女子排球隊
- Short name: Bayi Women’s Volleyball 八一女排
- Founded: 1951
- Dissolved: 2020
- Ground: Nanchang Stadium, Nanchang, China (Capacity: 2500)
- Owner: People's Liberation Army
- Manager: (China) Wu Xiaojiang
- Captain: Liu Yanhan
- League: Chinese Volleyball League
- 2017-18: 5th ▲3

Uniforms
Home	Away

Bayi Nanchang Women's Volleyball Team, formerly Bayi Kemen Noodle Manufacturing named from 2001 to 2015 and Bayi Shenzhen from 2015 to 2018, was a professional women's volleyball club based in Nanchang, Jiangxi and competes in the Chinese Women's Volleyball Super League. They won the championship in 2001 and 2014. The team was based in Shenzhen, and later in Nanchang. The team was dissolved in 2020 due to policy change.

Fan Linlin, Yang Junjing, Yuan Xinyue, and Liu Yanhan were national team players. Shen Jingsi, Sun Xiaoqing, Chen Yao, Bai Yun, and Wang Lin were former national players. The team was established in 1951. A unique feature of the team was that all of its players were members of the People's Liberation Army.

== CVL results ==
Season	Final ranking
2018-2019	9th
2017-2018	5th
2016-2017	8th
2015-2016	4th
2014-2015	Champions
2013-2014	Third Place
2012-2013	5th
2011-2012	4th
2010-2011	5th
2009-2010	Third Place
2008-2009	5th
2007-2008	Runners-up
2006-2007	4th
2005-2006	7th
2004-2005	Runners-up
2003-2004	Runners-up
2002-2003	Runners-up
2001-2002	Champions
2000-2001	Runners-up
1999-2000	Third Place
1998-1999	4th
1997-1998	6th
1996-1997	4th

== Roster ==
=== 2016-2017 ===
Number	Player	Position	Height (m)	Birth date
1	(China) Wang Yunlu	Spiker	1.93	20/05/1996
2	(China) Zhou Yujie	Setter	1.81	13/10/1991
3	(China) Wang Xinyao	Middle Blocker	1.90	25/07/1995
4	(China) Shi Peixin	Spiker	1.93	26/07/1996
5	(China) Liu Yanhan	Spiker	1.95	19/01/1993
6	(China) Yang Junjing	Middle Blocker	1.90	15/05/1989
7	(China) Shen Jingsi (c)	Setter	1.86	03/05/1989
8	(China) Liutao Xiaoyu	Opposite	1.94	28/12/1996
9	(China) Chen Yao	Middle Blocker	1.92	22/09/1988
10	(China) Zuo Ting	Spiker	1.84	03/02/1990
11	(China) Qi Lin	Setter	1.85	25/05/1993
12	(China) Yuan Xinyue	Middle Blocker	2.01	21/12/1996
13	(China) Yan Kailun	Middle Blocker	1.92	17/07/1995
14	(China) Yuan Weiyu	Spiker	1.83	25/03/1995
15	(China) Zhu Mengdi	Setter	1.80	16/06/1995
16	(China) Wang Yan	Middle Blocker	1.83	10/03/1988
17	(China) Huang Liuyan	Libero	1.80	13/06/1994
18	(China) Wang Qi	Spiker	1.88	22/09/1993
19	(China) Liu Congcong	Middle Blocker	1.90	08/12/1990
20	(China) Lin Yueming	Libero	1.77	03/08/1998

== Former players ==
- (China) Cui Yongmei
- (China) Wu Yongmei
- (China) Wang Lina
- (China) Song Nina
- (China) Zhao Ruirui
- (China) Suo Ma
- (China) Li Ying
- (China) Bai Yun
- (China) Wang Lin
- (China) Sun Xiaoqing
- (China) Ye Shuting
- (China) Liu Congcong
- (China) Fan Linlin
- (China) Zhu Linfen

== Honors ==
Asian Women's Club Volleyball Championship

Second place - 2004, 2016
