= Megumi Kawamura =

Japanese volleyball player and model

Personal information
- Born: 河村めぐみ; July 12, 1983 (age 42) Kitakyushu, Japan
- Other interests: Fashion model

Sport
- Sport: Volleyball
- Team: NEC Red Rockets
- Turned pro: 2001
- Retired: 2005

Megumi Kawamura (河村めぐみ, Kawamura Megumi; born July 12, 1983) is a former Japanese volleyball player and occasional model. She is the tallest fashion model in Japan.

Kawamura was a member of the national volleyball team that won the bronze medal at the 2001 World Grand Champions Cup, playing middle blocker for NEC Red Rockets. Wearing number 10 and 15, she stayed with the team until her retirement on August 30, 2005.

== Biography ==
Born in Kitakyushu, Fukuoka, she studied at Higashi Kyushu Ryukoku high school (東九州龍谷高等学校) and was a member of the volleyball team there. When she was 11 years old, she was featured in a TV show as Japan's tallest primary school child. She comes from a tall family, with both her father and her brother measuring 6 ft 3 in (191 cm). After finishing high school, she joined the volleyball team NEC Red Rockets. She was called up to the Japanese national team and played in the 2001 World Grand Champions Cup.

Because of her height of 193 cm (6 ft 4 in), Kawamura was positioned as a middle blocker.

After retiring, Kawamura began her modeling career. In 2005, she participated in a selection pageant for the Japanese representative of Miss International 2006.

== TV appearances ==
- (in Japanese)ラジかる

== Awards ==
- World Grand Champions Cup Bronze Medal (2001)
- The 11th Women's V.League New Face Award (2004–05)
