= Fan Linlin =

Chinese volleyball player

Personal information
- Full name: Fan Linlin
- Nickname: Fan Lin
- Nationality: Chinese
- Born: 1 December 1991; Beijing, China
- Hometown: Beijing, China
- Height: 1.90 m (6 ft 3 in)
- Weight: 77 kg (170 lb)
- Spike: 316 cm (124 in)
- Block: 301 cm (119 in)

Volleyball information
- Position: Spiker
- Current club: Army
- Number: 18

National team
2010-2012	China
Honours
Women's volleyball
Representing China
FIVB World Cup
Bronze medal – third place	2011 Japan	Team
Asian Championship
Gold medal – first place	2011 Taipei	Team
- Last updated: Oct 2016

Fan Linlin (simplified Chinese: 範琳琳; traditional Chinese: 范琳琳; pinyin: Fàn Línlín; born 1 December 1991 in Beijing) is a Chinese volleyball player. She was the spiker of the China women's national volleyball team. She plays in Army club.
