= Hokkaido University of Education =

- 北海道教育大学
- Type: Public university
- Established: 1949
- Location: Sapporo, Hokkaido, Japan
- Campus: Sapporo 43°10′7.4″N 141°23′47.5″E Asahikawa 43°47′15.4″N 142°20′56″E Kushiro 42°58′52″N 144°23′55.5″E Hakodate 41°47′34.2″N 140°44′26.4″E Iwamizawa 43°11′16.8″N 141°46′32.2″E
- Website: www.hokkyodai.ac.jp/eng/

Hokkaido University of Education (HUE) (北海道教育大学, Hokkaidō Kyōiku Daigaku) is a national public university administered by the government of Japan. It has five campuses in Hokkaido, Japan.

The main campus is on the outskirts of Sapporo, the capital of Hokkaido. Hokkaido University of Education, Sapporo (HUES) is the largest with a little over 1000 students. Other campuses are in Asahikawa, Kushiro, Hakodate, and Iwamizawa.

HUE is primarily dedicated to training teachers, and each of the campuses have associated public schools where students may practice teaching.

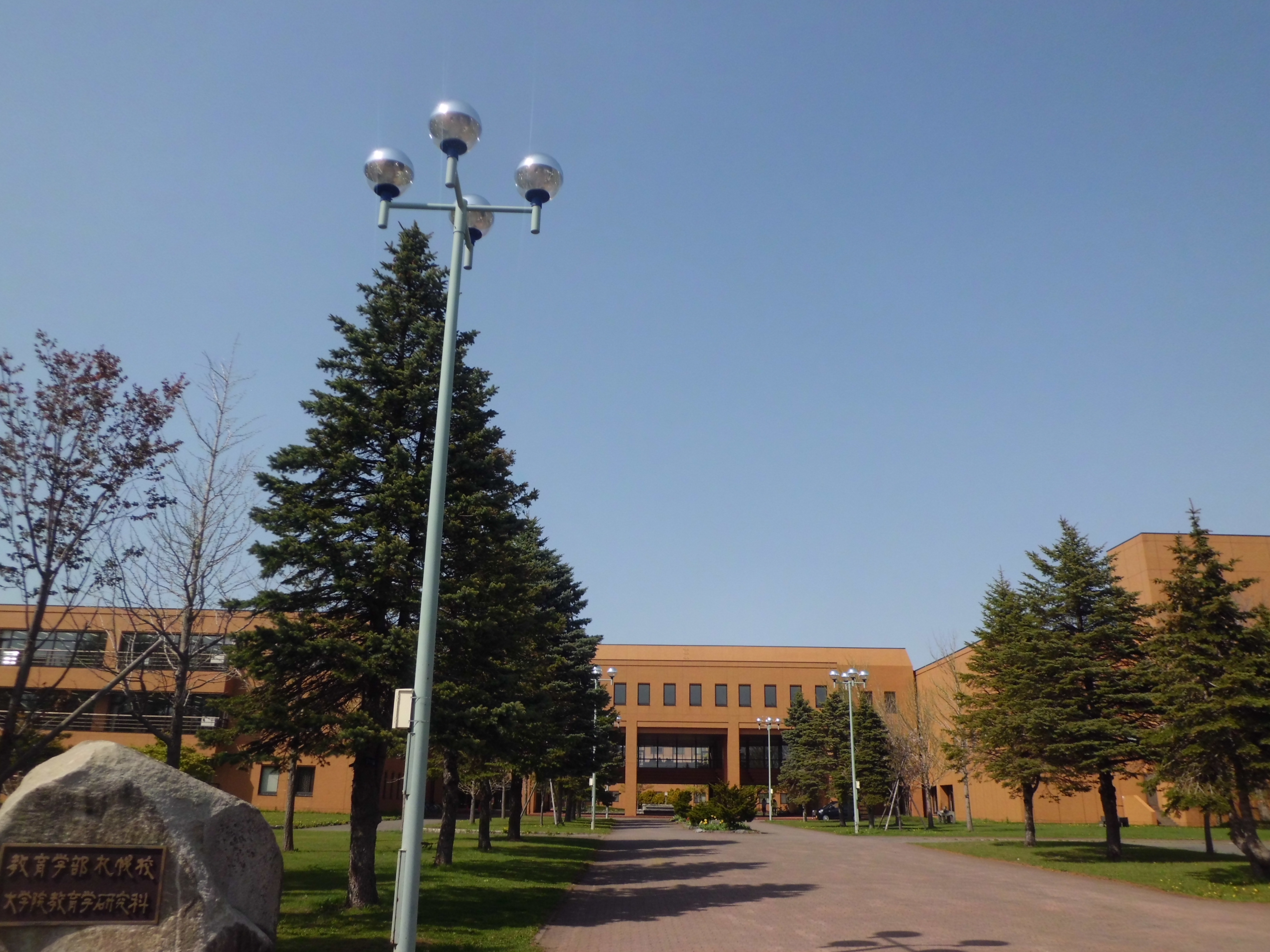
Sapporo campus

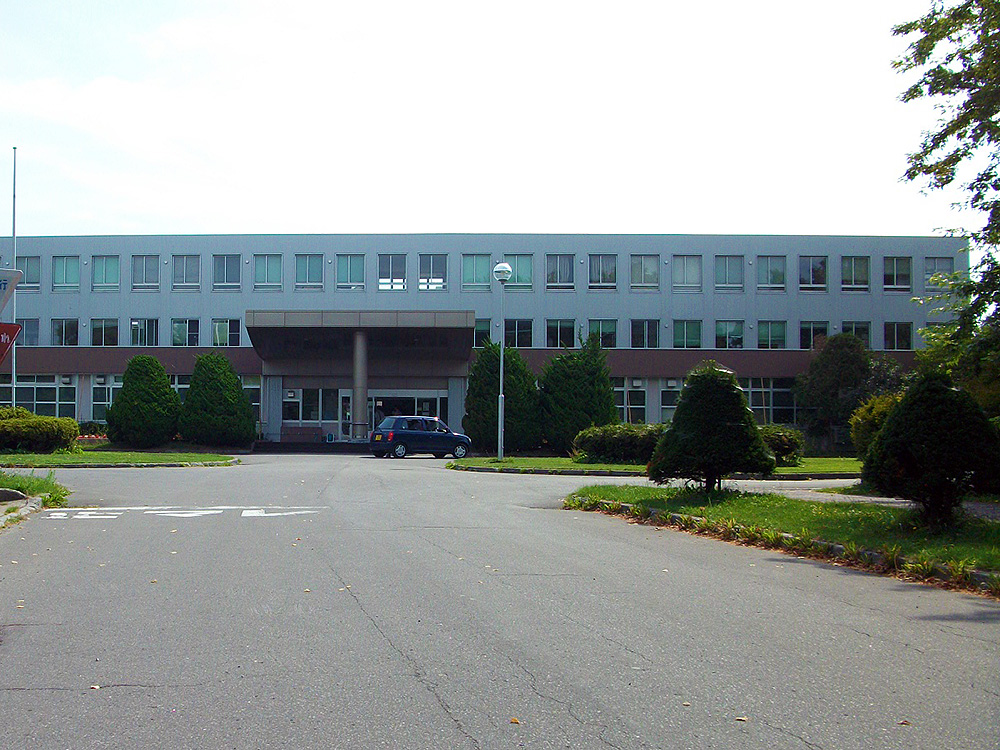
Hakodate campus

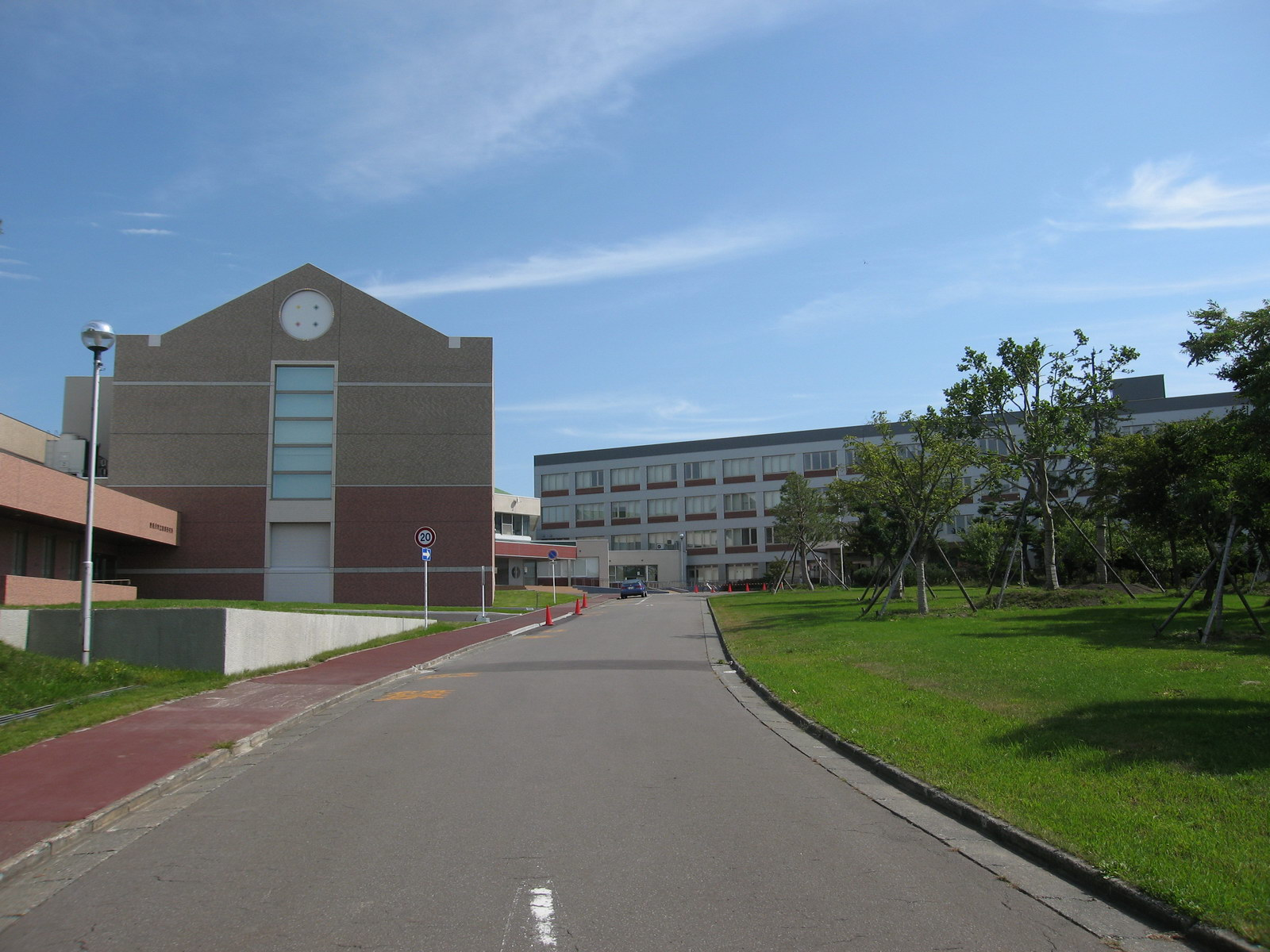
Iwamizawa campus
