= Chen Yao (volleyball) =

Chinese volleyball player (born 1988)

Yao Chen

Personal information
- Nationality: Chinese
- Born: 25 September 1988 (age 38)
- Height: 1.91 m (6 ft 3 in)
- Weight: 74 kg (163 lb)
- Spike: 315 cm (124 in)
- Block: 305 cm (120 in)

Volleyball information
- Number: 17

Career
Years	Teams
2010	Army

National team
2010	China

Yao Chen (born 25 September 1988) is a retired Chinese female volleyball player. She was part of the China women's national volleyball team.

She participated in the 2010 FIVB Volleyball Women's World Championship. She played with Army.

== Clubs ==
- (China) Army (2010)
