= Nguyễn Linh Chi =

Vietnamese volleyball player (born 1990)

Personal information
- Full name: Nguyễn Linh Chi
- Nickname: Chi Chi
- Born: July 31, 1990 (age 36); Phú Thọ, Vietnam
- Height: 1.73 m (5 ft 8 in)
- Weight: 65 kg (143 lb)
- Spike: 295 cm (9 ft 8 in)
- Block: 288 cm (9 ft 5 in)

Volleyball information
- Position: Setter

Career
Years	Teams
2010 – 2021	(Vietnam) Bộ Tư lệnh Thông tin - FLC

National team
2014 - 2018	Vietnam

Nguyễn Linh Chi (born July 31, 1990) is a retired Vietnamese volleyball player of the Vietnam women's national volleyball team.

== Clubs ==
- (Vietnam) Bộ Tư lệnh Thông tin - FLC

== Awards ==
=== Individuals ===
- 2014 Vietnam League "Best setter"
- 2015 VTV Binh Dien International Cup "Best Setter"
- 2015 VTV International Cup "Miss Volleyball"
- 2015 Vietnam League "Best setter"
- 2016 Vietnam League "Best setter"
- 2017 Vietnam League "Best setter"
- 2018 VTV International Cup "Best Setter"
- 2018 Vietnam League "Best setter"
- 2020 Vietnam League "Best setter"

=== National team ===
- 2015 SEA Games — Silver Medal
- 2017 SEA Games — Bronze Medal

=== Clubs ===
- 2010 Vietnam League - Champion, with Thông tin Liên Việt Bank
- 2011 Vietnam League - Runner-Up, with Thông tin Liên Việt Post Bank
- 2012 Vietnam League - Champion, with Thông tin Liên Việt Post Bank
- 2013 Vietnam League - Champion, with Thông tin Liên Việt Post Bank
- 2014 Vietnam League - Champion, with Thông tin Liên Việt Post Bank
- 2015 Vietnam League - Champion, with Thông tin Liên Việt Post Bank
- 2016 Vietnam League - Runner-Up, with Thông tin Liên Việt Post Bank
- 2017 Vietnam League - Runner-Up, with Thông tin Liên Việt Post Bank
- 2018 Vietnam League - Runner-Up, with Thông tin Liên Việt Post Bank
- 2019 Vietnam League - Champion, with Thông tin Liên Việt Post Bank
- 2020 Vietnam League - Champion, with Thông tin Liên Việt Post Bank
- 2021 Vietnam League - Champion, with Bộ Tư lệnh Thông tin - FLC
