= Trần Việt Hương =

Vietnamese volleyball player (born 1998)

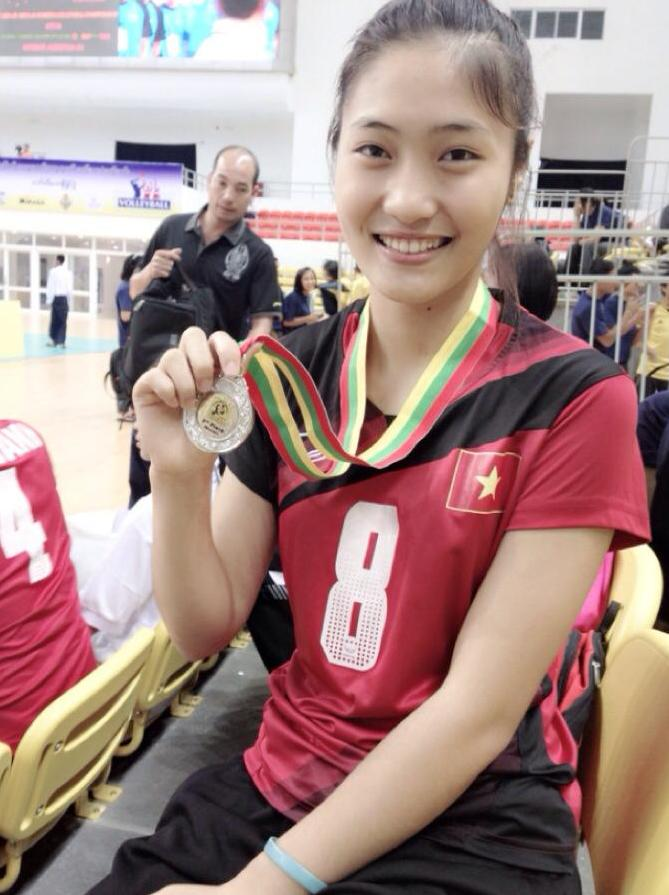

Personal information
- Born: October 13, 1998 (age 28) Phú Thọ, Vietnam
- Height: 1.78 m (5 ft 10 in)
- Spike: 295 cm (116 in)
- Block: 285 cm (112 in)

Volleyball information
- Position: Middle Blocker
- Current club: Bộ Tư lệnh Thông tin
- Number: 8

National team
- Years: Team
- 2012–2014 2014–2016 2017–2019 2022: U18 Vietnam; U20 Vietnam; U23 Vietnam; Vietnam

Trần Việt Hương (born 13 October 1998), is a Vietnamese retired female professional volleyball player. She played for Bộ Tư lệnh Thông tin.

== Awards ==
- 2016 Vietnam League - Runner-Up, with Thông tin Liên Việt Post Bank
- 2017 Vietnam League - Runner-Up, with Thông tin Liên Việt Post Bank
- 2018 Vietnam League - Runner-Up, with Thông tin Liên Việt Post Bank
- 2019 Vietnam League - Champion, with Thông tin Liên Việt Post Bank
- 2020 Vietnam League - Champion, with Thông tin Liên Việt Post Bank
- 2021 Vietnam League - Champion, with Bộ Tư lệnh Thông tin - FLC

== National team ==
=== Senior team ===
- 2021 SEA Games - Silver Medal

=== U23 team ===
- 2017 Asian Championship - Bronze Medal

=== U20 team ===
- 2016 ASEAN Championship - Silver Medal
