= Negin Shirtari =

Iranian volleyball player (born 1998)

Personal information
- Full name: Negin Shirtari Foumani
- Born: 3 March 1998 (age 28); Rasht, Iran
- Height: 1.82 m (6 ft 0 in)
- Weight: 88 kg (194 lb)
- Spike: 2.80 m (110 in)
- Block: 2.68 m (106 in)

Negin Shirtari Foumani (Persian: نگین شیرتری فومنی, born March 3, 1998) is a volleyball player from Iran who plays as a setter for the Women's National Team and CD Aves. She participated in the championship in Korea in 2019 with the women's volleyball team.
