= Shokei Gakuin University =

Private University in Miyagi, Japan

Coordinates: 38°11′45.7″N 140°49′46.1″E

Shokei Gakuin University (尚絅学院大学, Shōkei gakuin daigaku) is a private university in Natori, Miyagi, Japan, established in 2003. The predecessor of the school was founded in 1892.
