= Ai Hirota =

Japanese volleyball player

Personal information
- Nationality: Japanese
- Born: 23 August 2003 (age 23) Chiba Prefecture, Japan
- Height: 175 cm (5 ft 9 in)

Volleyball information
- Position: Outside hitter
- Current club: NEC Red Rockets Kawasaki

Career
- Years: Team
- 2022–: NEC Red Rockets Kawasaki

National team
- Years: Team
- 2019: Japan U18
- 2023: Japan U21
- 2025–: Japan
Honours
Women's volleyball
Representing Japan
Asian Games
Silver medal – second place	2026 Aichi–Nagoya	Team

Ai Hirota (Japanese: 廣田 あい, born 23 August 2003) is a Japanese volleyball player who plays as an outside hitter for NEC Red Rockets Kawasaki in the Japanese professional volleyball league and the Japan women's national volleyball team. She represented Japan at the 2023 FIVB Volleyball Women's U21 World Championship and was selected for the senior national team in 2025. Hirota won a silver medal with Japan at the 2026 Asian Games.

== Early life ==
Hirota was born in Chiba Prefecture, Japan. She began playing volleyball as a young child, influenced by her older brother and sister, who also played the sport. She joined the Tokyo-based youth club Higashikanamachi Beavers and later attended Bunkyo Gakuin University Girls' Junior and Senior High School in Tokyo. During her junior career, she won national competitions and represented Tokyo in the JOC Cup.

== Career ==
=== Club career ===
After graduating from Bunkyo Gakuin University Girls' High School, Hirota joined NEC Red Rockets in April 2022. She plays primarily as an outside hitter and is also capable of playing as an opposite hitter. Her attacking game includes powerful spikes and back-row attacks.

Hirota continued with NEC Red Rockets Kawasaki following the introduction of the SV.League in 2024. She was named vice-captain of the team for the 2026–27 season.

=== Junior international career ===
Hirota represented Japan at the 2019 FIVB Volleyball Women's U18 World Championship in Egypt. In 2023, she was selected for Japan's squad at the 2023 FIVB Volleyball Women's U21 World Championship in Mexico, where Japan finished fourth.

=== Senior international career ===
In July 2025, Hirota was added to the Japan women's senior national-team roster. She subsequently represented Japan in an invitational series against South Korea in August 2025. Her selection followed a period in which injuries had limited her appearances for NEC during the latter part of the preceding club season.

Hirota was included in Japan's roster for the 2026 international season, including the 2026 FIVB Volleyball Women's Nations League. She was also selected for the women's volleyball tournament at the 2026 Asian Games.

At the 2026 Asian Games in Aichi and Nagoya, Japan, Hirota was part of the Japanese women's team that won the silver medal. Japan defeated South Korea in the semifinal to reach the final, where it faced China. Japan finished as runner-up after losing the final, with China taking the gold medal and Thailand winning bronze.
