= Haruyo Shimamura =

Japanese volleyball player (born 1992)

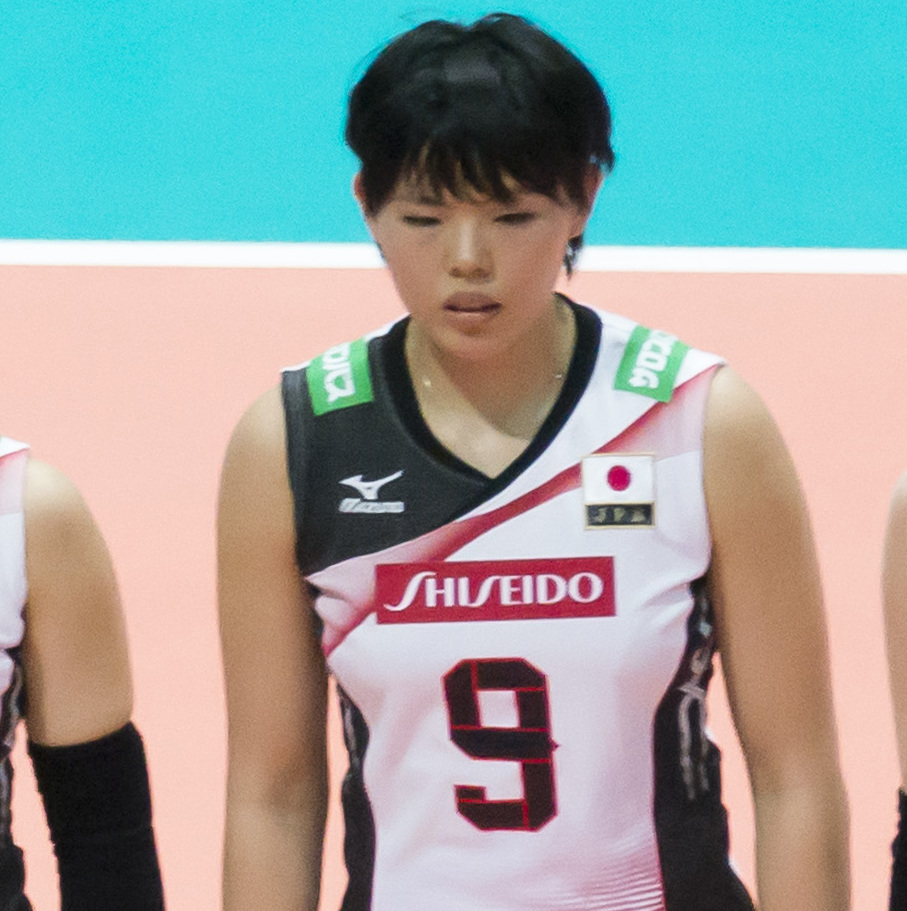

Personal information
- Full name: Haruyo Shimamura
- Nickname: John
- Nationality: Japanese
- Born: March 4, 1992 (age 34) Kamakura, Kanagawa, Japan
- Height: 1.82 m (6 ft 0 in)
- Weight: 79 kg (174 lb)
- Spike: 313 cm (123 in)
- Block: 300 cm (118 in)

Volleyball information
- Position: Middle blocker
- Current club: (Japan) Gunma Green Wings
- Number: 3 (national)

Career
- Years: Team
- 2010–2025: (Japan) NEC Red Rockets
- 2025–2026: (South Korea) Gwangju AI Peppers
- 2026–: (Japan) Gunma Green Wings

National team
- Years: Team
- 2013: U-23 national team
- 2013–present: Senior national team
Honours
Women's volleyball
Representing Japan
Asian Games
Silver medal – second place	2022 Hangzhou	Team
AVC Continental Championship
Gold medal – first place	2017 Manila	Team
Bronze medal – third place	2023 Nakhon Ratchasima	Team
Bronze medal – third place	2026 Tianjin	Team

Haruyo Shimamura (島村 春世, Shimamura Haruyo; born March 4, 1992) is a Japanese volleyball player who plays in club level for Gunma Green Wings in SV.League, Japan. She had played with NEC Red Rockets team for 15 years, which 2024–25 was the last season.

Shimamura also plays for the Japan women's national volleyball team. She competed at the 2016 and 2020 Summer Olympics.

== Life ==
Shimamura was born in 1992. She played for the Japanese national team for the first time at the Montreux Volley Masters in May 2013 and in 2016 she played at the 2016 Summer Olympics in Rio de Janeiro. She played in Olympic Games again in 2020 Summer Olympics in Tokyo.

Shimamura had been the captain of the NEC Red Rockets since the 2015–16 season. She played with NEC in 2024–25 as the last season, so she had been with the team for 15 years since 2010–11.

== Clubs ==
- (Japan) Kamakura Municipal Koshigoe Junior High
- (Japan) Kawasaki Municipal Tachibana High School (2007–2010)
- (Japan) NEC Red Rockets (2010–2025)
- (South Korea) Gwangju AI Peppers (2025–2026)
- (Japan) Gunma Green Wings (2026–)

== Awards ==
=== Individuals ===
- 2012 : V.Summer League – Most Valuable Player (MVP)

=== Clubs ===
- 2012 : V.Summer League – Champion, with NEC Red Rockets.
- 2015 : V.Premier League – Champion with NEC Red Rockets
- 2024 : Asian Women's Club Volleyball Championship – Champion, with NEC Red Rockets

=== National team ===
- 2017 : Asian Women's Volleyball Championship - Champion
