= Liu Congcong =

Chinese volleyball player (born 1990)

Personal information
- Nationality: Chinese
- Born: 8 December 1990 (age 35)
- Height: 189 cm (74 in)
- Weight: 65 kg (143 lb)
- Spike: 310 cm (122 in)
- Block: 302 cm (119 in)

Career
Years	Teams
2009 - present	Army

National team
2012 - 2013	China

Liu Congcong (born 8 December 1990) is a Chinese female volleyball player. She was part of the China women's national volleyball team.

She participated in the 2013 FIVB Volleyball World Grand Prix. On club level she played for Army in 2013.
