= Kwai Tsing women's volleyball team =

Sports team

Kwai Tsing
- Full name: Kwai Tsing Women's Volleyball Team
- Founded: 1988
- Ground: Kwai Tsing, Hong Kong
- Manager: W: (Hong Kong) Lam Chun Kwok
- Captain: W: (Hong Kong) Cheung Man Lee
- League: Hong Kong Volleyball league – Division A

The Kwai Tsing Women's Volleyball Team (Chinese: 葵青女子排球隊) is a women's volleyball club based in Kwai Tsing, Hong Kong. Established in 1988, they play in the Hong Kong Volleyball League – Division A1. They also participated as Hong Kong's representatives at the 2016 Asian Women's Club Volleyball Championship.

== Roster ==
2016 Asian Women's Club Volleyball Championship

Head coach: (Hong Kong) Lam Chun Kwok

No.	Name	Date of birth	Height	Weight	Spike	Block
1	(Hong Kong) Mui Pik Sum	11 November 1994	1.74 m (5 ft 9 in)	67 kg (148 lb)	275 cm (108 in)	265 cm (104 in)
2	(Hong Kong) Kwok Chun Chi	28 June 1994	1.74 m (5 ft 9 in)	67 kg (148 lb)	275 cm (108 in)	265 cm (104 in)
3	(Hong Kong) Kwok Pui Yiu	20 September 1991	1.73 m (5 ft 8 in)	62 kg (137 lb)	275 cm (108 in)	270 cm (110 in)
4	(Hong Kong) Tam Ho Yan	31 October 1993	1.65 m (5 ft 5 in)	55 kg (121 lb)	270 cm (110 in)	265 cm (104 in)
5	(Hong Kong) Law Ho Fung	10 May 1995	1.68 m (5 ft 6 in)	63 kg (139 lb)	270 cm (110 in)	275 cm (108 in)
6	(Hong Kong) Chan Eu Eu	1 October 1988	1.55 m (5 ft 1 in)	55 kg (121 lb)	240 cm (94 in)	230 cm (91 in)
7	(Hong Kong) Cheung Man Lee (C)	15 August 1987	1.74 m (5 ft 9 in)	59 kg (130 lb)	275 cm (108 in)	270 cm (110 in)
8	(Hong Kong) Fung Wing Yan	7 March 1990	1.75 m (5 ft 9 in)	74 kg (163 lb)	275 cm (108 in)	270 cm (110 in)
9	(Hong Kong) Szeto Wun Kee	23 June 1994	1.70 m (5 ft 7 in)	65 kg (143 lb)	270 cm (110 in)	265 cm (104 in)
10	(Hong Kong) Chan Han Ming	15 June 1992	1.72 m (5 ft 8 in)	55 kg (121 lb)	275 cm (108 in)	265 cm (104 in)
11	(Hong Kong) Siu Ho Yan	17 April 1994	1.60 m (5 ft 3 in)	47 kg (104 lb)	240 cm (94 in)	230 cm (91 in)
12	(Hong Kong) Wong Bo Kwan	27 June 1992	1.68 m (5 ft 6 in)	56 kg (123 lb)	270 cm (110 in)	265 cm (104 in)
13	(Hong Kong) Yeung Sau Mei	30 August 1985	1.83 m (6 ft 0 in)	64 kg (141 lb)	280 cm (110 in)	275 cm (108 in)
14	(Hong Kong) Chow Yin Lam	20 April 1996	1.73 m (5 ft 8 in)	58 kg (128 lb)	270 cm (110 in)	265 cm (104 in)
15	(Hong Kong) Yu Ying Chi	7 August 1992	1.69 m (5 ft 7 in)	58 kg (128 lb)	270 cm (110 in)	265 cm (104 in)
17	(Hong Kong) Ng Ka Ki	17 September 1985	1.76 m (5 ft 9 in)	65 kg (143 lb)	265 cm (104 in)	265 cm (104 in)
18	(Hong Kong) Yau Ching	18 January 1996	1.73 m (5 ft 8 in)	65 kg (143 lb)	275 cm (108 in)	265 cm (104 in)

== Honours ==
Hong Kong Volleyball League – Division A

- Second:2015

Hong Kong Volleyball Open Marathon – Division A

- Champions:2016

Hong Kong Southern Districts Volleyball Championships

  - Champions:2015

2015 President Cup

- Champions:2015
