= Akari Oumi =

Japanese volleyball player (born 1989)

Personal information
- Full name: Akari Oumi
- Nickname: Akari
- Born: 10 November 1989 (age 36); Kyoto, Kyoto, Japan
- Height: 1.71 m (5 ft 7 1/2 in)
- Weight: 64 kg (141 lb)
- Spike: 292 cm (115 in)
- Block: 276 cm (109 in)

Volleyball information
- Position: Outside hitter
- Current club: NEC Red Rockets
- Number: 6

National team
Japan
Medal record
Women's volleyball
Representing Japan
Asian Championship
Silver medal – second place	2013 Nakhon Ratchasima	Team

Akari Oumi (近江 あかり, Oumi Akari, born 10 November 1989) is a Japanese volleyball player who retired from the NEC Red Rockets after the 2016-2017 season. She also played for Japan women's national volleyball team.

== Clubs ==
- (Japan) Kyoto Tachibana Highschool
- (Japan) Tokai University
- (Japan) NEC Red Rockets (2012-2017)

== Awards ==
=== Individual ===
- 2012 Kurowashiki All Japan Volleyball Tournament - New Face Award
- 2013 Japan V.Premier League - New Face Award (Rookie of the Year), Best6
- 2014/15 Japan V.Premier League - MVP

=== Team ===
- 2014/15 Japan V.Premier League - Champion - NEC Red Rockets
- 2016 Asian Women's Club Volleyball Championship in Biñan City, Philippines - Champion - NEC Red Rockets
- 2016/17 Japan V.Premier League - Champion - NEC Red Rockets

=== National team ===
- 2013 Asian Women's Seniors Volleyball Championship - Silver medal
- 2013 FIVB Women's World Grand Champions Cup - Bronze medal
