= NEC Red Rockets =

Japanese volleyball club

NEC Red Rockets Kawasaki
- Founded: 1978
- Ground: Tokyo and Kawasaki, Japan
- Manager Head Coach: (Japan) Okada Rie (Japan) Kodai Nakaya
- Captain: Nichika Yamada
- League: SV.League
- 2025-26: Third place
- Website: Club home page

Uniforms
Home	Away

NEC Red Rockets (NECレッドロケッツ, NEC Reddo Rokettsu) is a women's volleyball team based in Kawasaki, Kanagawa Prefecture, Japan. It plays in SV.League. The owner of the team is NEC.

The club was founded in April 1978 as NEC's corporate team, participating the same year in the 10th V.Challenge League tournament. The club advanced to membership in the Japan Volleyball League in 1979, securing 3rd place in the league rankings by the end of the season. The club has subsequently been league champions nine times, and marked its 200th victory in 2008.

In 2021, the team rebranded to further evolve while preserving its history, and relocated its hometown to the Kawasaki area of Kanagawa Prefecture and the Tokyo area.

The three-layered lines on the rocket body, which is the team's emblem, represent the team, supporters, and community aboard the rocket. The team

== Honours ==
Japan Volleyball League/V.League/V.Premier League

- Champions (9): 1987–1988, 1996–1997, 1999–2000, 2002–2003, 2004–2005, 2014–2015, 2016–2017, 2022–2023, 2023–2024.
- Runners-up (4): 1986–1987, 1995–1996, 1997–1998, 2001-2002.

Kurowashiki All Japan Volleyball Championship

- Champions (2): 1997, 2001.
- Runners-up (7): 1985, 1987, 1995, 1996, 1999, 2011, 2013.

== League results ==
League		Position	Teams	Matches	Wins	Loss(es)
Japan League	13th (1979–80)	3rd	6	10	7	3
Japan League	14th (1980–81)	4th	8	14	7	7
Japan League	15th (1981–82)	5th	8	21	7	14
Japan League	16th (1982–83)	6th	8	21	7	14
Japan League	17th (1983–84)	6th	8	21	8	13
Japan League	18th (1984–85)	3rd	8	21	14	7
Japan League	19th (1985–86)	3rd	8	21	12	9
Japan League	20th (1986–87)	Runners-up	8	21	17	4
Japan League	21st (1987–88)	Champions	8	14	12	2
Japan League	22nd (1988–89)	4th	8	17	9	8
Japan League	23rd (1989–90)	3rd	8	17	13	4
Japan League	24th (1990–91)	3rd	8	17	9	8
Japan League	25th (1991–92)	7th	8	14	3	11
Japan League	26th (1992–93)	4th	8	14	8	6
Japan League	27th (1993–94)	4th	8	14	9	5
V・League	1st (1994–95)	5th	8	21	11	10
V・League	2nd (1995–96)	Runners-up	8	21	14	7
V・League	3rd (1996–97)	Champions	8	21	16	5
V・League	4th (1997–98)	Runners-up	8	21	18	3
V・League	5th (1998–99)	3rd	10	18	13	5
V・League	6th (1999-2000)	Champions	10	18	18	0
V・League	7th (2000–01)	3rd	10	18	17	1
V・League	8th (2001–02)	Runners-up	9	16	10	6
V・League	9th (2002–03)	Champions	8	21	17	4
V・League	10th (2003–04)	4th	10	18	12	6
V・League	11th (2004–05)	Champions	10	27	20	7
V・League	12th (2005–06)	6th	10	27	13	14
V・Premier	2006-07	5th	10	27	15	12
V・Premier	2007-08	6th	10	27	13	14
V・Premier	2008-09	3rd	10	27	18	9
V・Premier	2009-10	5th	8	28	10	18
V・Premier	2010-11	4th	8	26	15	11
V・Premier	2011-12	8th	8	21	3	18
V・Premier	2012-13	4th	8	28	23	5
V・Premier	2013-14	5th	8	28	12	16
V・Premier	2014-15	Champions	8	21	13	8
V・Premier	2015-16	5th	8	21	8	13
V・Premier	2016-17	Champions	8	21	15	6
V・Premier	2017-18	5th	8	21	8	13
V.League Division 1 (V1)	2018–19	6th	11	20	11	9
V.League Division 1 (V1)	2019–20	8th	12	21	11	10
V.League Division 1 (V1)	2020–21	3rd	12	20	15	5
V.League Division 1 (V1)	2021–22	4th	12	33	23	10
V.League Division 1 (V1)	2022–23	Champions				
V.League Division 1 (V1)	2023–24	Champions				
SV.League	2024-25	Runners-up	14	51	34	17
SV.League	2025-26	3rd	14	48	38	10

== Current squad ==
2026/27 squad as of November 2026

- Head coach: (Japan) Kodai Nakaya

No.	Name	Position	Date of birth	Height (m)
1	(Japan) Nichika Yamada	Middle Blocker	24 February 2000 (age 26)	1.84 m (6 ft 0 in)
3	(Japan) Sayaka Daikuzono	Libero	3 August 2000 (age 26)	1.63 m (5 ft 4 in)
4	(Japan) Ai Hirota	Outside Hitter	23 August 2003 (age 23)	1.75 m (5 ft 9 in)
6	(Japan) Yuka Sawada	Setter	14 August 1996 (age 30)	1.58 m (5 ft 2 in)
7	(Japan) Moeka Kinoe	Middle Blocker	24 December 1997 (age 28)	1.81 m (5 ft 11 in)
8	(Japan) Kasumi Nojima	Middle Blocker	9 May 1997 (age 29)	1.81 m (5 ft 11 in)
9	(Japan) Natsumi Kodama	Libero	16 May 2002 (age 24)	1.68 m (5 ft 6 in)
10	(Japan) Tsukasa Nakagawa (c)	Setter	13 August 2000 (age 26)	1.59 m (5 ft 3 in)
11	(Japan) Chinami Furuya	Outside Hitter	20 April 1996 (age 30)	1.73 m (5 ft 8 in)
12	(Japan) Haruko Sasaki	Outside Hitter	9 March 2002 (age 24)	1.72 m (5 ft 8 in)
13	(Japan) Misuzu Takahashi	Outside Hitter	5 November 2002 (age 24)	1.70 m (5 ft 7 in)
14	(Japan) Naka Hasebe	Middle Blocker	25 January 2003 (age 23)	1.75 m (5 ft 9 in)
15	(Italy) Sylvia Nwakalor	Opposite Hitter	12 August 1999 (age 27)	1.80 m (5 ft 11 in)
16	(Japan) Aimi Okawa	Outside Hitter	6 April 2002 (age 24)	1.76 m (5 ft 9 in)
17	(Japan) Ichiyo Ito	Middle Blocker	16 January 2006 (age 20)	1.79 m (5 ft 10 in)
18	(United States) Ciara Debell	Outside Hitter	10 November 1997 (age 29)	1.88 m (6 ft 2 in)
19	(United States) Mia Schafer	Setter	14 August 2002 (age 24)	1.74 m (5 ft 9 in)
22	(South Korea) Lee Da-hyeon	Middle Blocker	11 November 2001 (age 25)	1.85 m (6 ft 1 in)

== Former players ==
Domestic players

Japan

- Hiroko Tsukumo (1993–2004)
- Shinako Tanaka (2001–2002)
- Yoshie Takeshita (2002–2004)
- Megumi Kurihara (2003–2004)
- Megumi Kawamura (2001–2005)
- Ai Ōtomo (2000–2006)
- Miyuki Takahashi (2006–2009)
- Ikumi Narita (2007–2010)
- Sayoko Matsuzaki (2001–2010)
- Saori Arita (2003–2010)
- Saori Takasaki (2005–2010)
- Ayako Watanabe (2003–2011)
- Yuko Maruyama (2008–2011)
- Sachiko Sugiyama (1998–2013)
- Kanako Naito (2009–2012)
- Akari Oumi (2012–2017)
- Hiroko Matsuura (2009–2012)
- Akiko Ino (2009–2012)
- Yumiko Tsuzuki (2013–2014)
- Akiko Uchida (2008–2014)
- Makoto Matsuura (2010–2014)
- Miho Watanabe (2011–2014)
- Miyuki Akiyama (2007–2015)
- Nami Sagawa (2014–2017)
- Kaname Yamaguchi (2014–2019)
- Sayaka Iwasaki (2013–2019)
- Kana Ono (2011–2019)
- Saki Minemura (2018–2020)
- Yuna Okuyama (2014–2020)
- Shiori Aratani (ja) (2016–2020) Transferred to Himeji Victorina
- Mio Sato (2019–2021) (ja)
- Sarina Koga (2015-2024)
- Haruyo Shimamura (2010-2025)

Foreign players

Brazil

- Ana Paula Ferreira (2008–2010)
- Fernanda Garay (2010–2011)
- Lorrayna Marys da Silva (2024-)

Bulgaria

- Emiliya Nikolova (2016–2017)

Croatia

- Hana Čutura (2013–14)

Finland

- Riikka Lehtonen (2006–2007)

Poland

- Berenika Tomsia (2019–2020)

Russia

- Elena Tyurina (1990–1994)
- Elizaveta Tishchenko (1995–1997)
- Yelena Godina (1998–1999)

Serbia

- Brižitka Molnar (2011–2012)

Thailand

- Ajcharaporn Kongyot (2023–2025)

Turkey

- Yeliz Başa (2012–13, 2014–2016)
- Neriman Özsoy (2020–2021)

United States

- Erin Aldrich (2007–2008)
- Rhamat Alhassan (2018–19)
- Sarah Wilhite-Parsons (2020-2022)
- Dani Drews (2023-2024)
