= West Asian Volleyball Association =

Zonal association of volleyball in West Asia

- Abbreviation: WAVA
- Formation: December 1993; 32 years ago
- Type: Volleyball organisation
- Headquarters: Doha, Qatar
- Region served: West Asia
- Members: 12 national federations
- Official languages: English and Arabic
- President: Ali Ghanem Al-Kuwari
- Parent organization: Asian Volleyball Confederation

The West Asian Volleyball Association (WAVA) is one of five zonal associations of governance in volleyball within the Asian Volleyball Confederation (AVC). It governs indoor volleyball and beach volleyball in West Asia. WAVA consists of 12 national federation members which are full members with the Fédération Internationale de Volleyball (FIVB). All of them also represent the National Olympic Committees (NOCs) of their respective countries and dependent territories, allowing them to participate in the Olympic Games.

WAVA consists of the national volleyball federations of West Asia and run zonal championships including the West Asian Men's Volleyball Club Championship and West Asian Women's Volleyball Championship. It also promotes regional volleyball, supports the creation of national federations affiliated with FIVB, ensures compliance with FIVB regulations, plans annual activities, and reports competition results to the FIVB and confederations.

The current president, Ali Ghanem Al-Kuwari, president of the Qatar Volleyball Association, was elected as WAVA's president for the 2024–2028 term in Doha, Qatar, in March 2024. His election also secured him the position of vice-president within the continental governing body, AVC.

== National federations ==
The West Asian Volleyball Association has 12 national federations.

Code	Federation	National teams	Founded	FIVB affiliation	AVC affiliation	IOC member
BRN	Bahrain	Men's; U23; U21; U19; U17; Women's; U23; U21; U19; U17	1976	1976		Yes
IRQ	Iraq	Men's; U23; U21; U19; U17; Women's; U23; U21; U19; U17	1959	1959		Yes
JOR	Jordan	Men's; U23; U21; U19; U17; Women's; U23; U21; U19; U17	1961	1971		Yes
KUW	Kuwait	Men's; U23; U21; U19; U17; Women's; U23; U21; U19; U17	1964	1964		Yes
LBN	Lebanon	Men's; U23; U21; U19; U17; Women's; U23; U21; U19; U17	1949	1949		Yes
OMA	Oman	Men's; U23; U21; U19; U17; Women's; U23; U21; U19; U17	1978	1978		Yes
PLE	Palestine	Men's; U23; U21; U19; U17; Women's; U23; U21; U19; U17	1980	1980		Yes
QAT	Qatar	Men's; U23; U21; U19; U17; Women's; U23; U21; U19; U17	1974	1974		Yes
KSA	Saudi Arabia	Men's; U23; U21; U19; U17; Women's; U23; U21; U19; U17	1964	1964		Yes
SYR	Syria	Men's; U23; U21; U19; U17; Women's; U23; U21; U19; U17	1955	1955		Yes
UAE	United Arab Emirates	Men's; U23; U21; U19; U17; Women's; U23; U21; U19; U17	1976	1976		Yes
YEM	Yemen	Men's; U23; U21; U19; U17; Women's; U23; U21; U19; U17	1970	1970		Yes

== Competitions ==
=== WAVA active competitions ===
National teams:

- West Asian Men's Volleyball Championship
- West Asian Women's Volleyball Championship
- West Asian Men's U20 Volleyball Championship
- West Asian Men's U19 Volleyball Championship

beach volleyball competitions:

- West Asian Beach Volleyball Championship
- West Asian Women's U20 Beach Volleyball Championship

Club teams:

- West Asian Men's Volleyball Club Championship

== Current title holders ==
=== Indoor volleyball ===
Competition	Champions	Runners-up	3rd place	Ref.
National teams (men)
West Asian Championship (2026)	Oman	Qatar	Iraq	
West Asian U20 Championship (2024)	Saudi Arabia	United Arab Emirates	Bahrain	
West Asian U19 Championship (2023)	Bahrain	Saudi Arabia	Kuwait	
National teams (women)
West Asian Championship (2025)	Lebanon	Jordan	Iraq	
Club teams (men)
West Asian Volleyball Club Championship (2024)	(Qatar) Al Rayyan	Al Kuwait	(Qatar) Al Arabi	

=== Beach volleyball ===
Competition	Champions	Runners-up	3rd place	Ref.
National teams (men)
West Asian Beach Volleyball Championship (2024)	Oman; Mazin Alhashmi; Hood Al Jalaboubi	Oman; Haitham Alshereiqi; Ahmed Alhousni	Qatar; Abdallah Ibrahim Nassim; Mohamed Ihab Zaki	
National teams (women)
West Asian Beach Volleyball Championship (2024)	Lebanon; Cheikho Mirna; Hamzeh Mirvat	Jordan; Farah Alatout; Nancy Ayyash	Lebanon; Nour Hamze; Lara Al Nahi	
West Asian U20 Beach Volleyball Championship (2024)	Lebanon; Lara Al Nahi; Louna Khorbotly	Jordan; Ghayd Alashoush; Batoul Husein Ahmad Abdallah	Lebanon; Angelina Farah; Angy Lakkis	

== See also ==
- Central Asian Volleyball Association
- Eastern Asian Volleyball Association
- Oceania Zonal Volleyball Association
- Southeast Asian Volleyball Association
