= Volleyball at the Arab Games =

Volleyball has been an Arab Games event since the second edition in 1957 in Beirut, Lebanon.

== Indoor Volleyball ==
=== Men's tournaments ===
==== Summaries ====
| Year | Host | Final | | | Third-place game | | |
| Year | Host | Gold Medal | Score | Silver Medal | Bronze Medal | Score | Fourth Place |
|---|---|---|---|---|---|---|---|
| 1957; Details | (Lebanon); Beirut | Tunisia | ^{n/a} | Lebanon | Syria | ^{n/a} | Libya |
| 1961; Details | (Morocco); Casablanca | canceled | | | canceled | | |
| 1965; Details | (United Arab Republic); Cairo | UA Republic | – | Syria | Lebanon | – | |
| 1976; Details | (Syria); Damascus | | – | | | – | |
| 1985; Details | (Morocco); Rabat | Tunisia | – | Iraq | Saudi Arabia | – | |
| 1992; Details | (Syria); Damascus | Bahrain | – | Kuwait | Syria | – | |
| 1997; Details | (Lebanon); Beirut | Algeria | – | Saudi Arabia | Kuwait | – | Bahrain |
| 1999; Details | (Jordan); Amman | Tunisia | 3 – 2 | Egypt | Bahrain | – | Lebanon |
| 2004; Details | (Algeria); Algiers | Egypt | 3 – 1 | Algeria | Tunisia | 3 – 1 | Saudi Arabia |
| 2007; Details | (Egypt); Cairo | Qatar | 3 – 1 | Bahrain | Egypt | 3 – 1 | Saudi Arabia |
| 2011; Details | (Qatar); Doha | Egypt | 3 – 0 | Qatar | Algeria | 3 – 0 | Kuwait |
| 2023; Details | (Algeria) (5 cities)^{a} | Libya | 3 – 0 | Algeria | Qatar | 3 – 1 | Jordan |

^n/a A round-robin tournament determined the final standings. ^a Arab Games helds in 5 cities (Algiers, Oran, Constantine, Annaba and Tipaza). Volleyball tournament helds in Algiers.

==== Men's Medal summary ====
| Rank | Nation | Gold | Silver | Bronze | Total |
|---|---|---|---|---|---|
| 1 | Egypt | 3 | 1 | 1 | 5 |
| 2 | Tunisia | 3 | 0 | 1 | 4 |
| 3 | Algeria | 1 | 2 | 1 | 4 |
| 4 | Bahrain | 1 | 1 | 1 | 3 |
| 4 | Qatar | 1 | 1 | 1 | 3 |
| 6 | Libya | 1 | 0 | 0 | 1 |
| 7 | Syria | 0 | 1 | 2 | 3 |
| 8 | Kuwait | 0 | 1 | 1 | 2 |
| 8 | Lebanon | 0 | 1 | 1 | 2 |
| 8 | Saudi Arabia | 0 | 1 | 1 | 2 |
| 11 | Iraq | 0 | 1 | 0 | 1 |
| Totals (11 entries) | | 10 | 10 | 10 | 30 |

=== Women's tournaments ===
==== Summaries ====
| Year | Host | Final | | | Third-place game | | |
| Year | Host | Champion | Score | Second Place | Third Place | Score | Fourth Place |
|---|---|---|---|---|---|---|---|
| 1985; Details | (Morocco); Rabat | Morocco | – | Tunisia | Iraq | – | |
| 1992; Details | (Syria); Damascus | Egypt | – | Tunisia | Syria | – | |
| 1997; Details | (Lebanon); Beirut | Egypt | ^{n/a} | Algeria | Morocco | ^{n/a} | Lebanon |
| 1999; Details | (Jordan); Amman | Egypt | 3 – 0 | Tunisia | Algeria | – | Syria |
| 2004 | (Algeria); Algiers | canceled | | | canceled | | |
| 2007 | (Egypt); Cairo | canceled | | | canceled | | |
| 2011; Details | (Qatar); Doha | Egypt | ^{n/a} | Algeria | United Arab Emirates | ^{n/a} | Kuwait |
| 2023; Details | Algeria (5 cities) | Algeria | 3 – 0 | Tunisia | Jordan | 3 – 2 | United Arab Emirates |

^n/a A round-robin tournament determined the final standings.

==== Women's Medal summary ====
| Rank | Nation | Gold | Silver | Bronze | Total |
|---|---|---|---|---|---|
| 1 | Egypt | 4 | 0 | 0 | 4 |
| 2 | Algeria | 1 | 2 | 1 | 4 |
| 3 | Morocco | 1 | 0 | 1 | 2 |
| 4 | Tunisia | 0 | 4 | 0 | 4 |
| 5 | Iraq | 0 | 0 | 1 | 1 |
| 5 | Jordan | 0 | 0 | 1 | 1 |
| 5 | Syria | 0 | 0 | 1 | 1 |
| 5 | United Arab Emirates | 0 | 0 | 1 | 1 |
| Totals (8 entries) | | 6 | 6 | 6 | 18 |

==== Participating nations ====
| Nation | 85 (Morocco) | 92 (Syria) | 97 (Lebanon) | 99 (Jordan) | 11 (Qatar) | 23 (Algeria) | Years |
|---|---|---|---|---|---|---|---|
| Algeria | | | 2nd | 3rd | 2nd | 1st | |
| Egypt | | 1st | 1st | 1st | 1st | | |
| Iraq | 3rd | | | | | | |
| Jordan | | | | | | 3rd | |
| Kuwait | | | | | 4th | | |
| Lebanon | | | 4th | | | | |
| Morocco | 1st | | 3rd | | | | |
| Qatar | | | | | 5th | 5th | |
| Syria | | 3rd | | 4th | | | |
| Tunisia | 2nd | 2nd | | 2nd | | 2nd | |
| United Arab Emirates | | | | | 3rd | 4th | |

== Beach volleyball ==
=== Summaries ===
| Year | Host | Gold | Silver | Bronze |
|---|---|---|---|---|
| 2011; Details | (Qatar); Doha | (Oman) Al Subhi / Al Balushi | (Oman) Al Housni / Al Shereiqi | (Bahrain) Marhoon / Qarqoor |
