= 2026 WAVA Women's Volleyball Championship =

International indoor volleyball tournament

بطولة غرب آسيا الثالثة لمنتخبات السيدات بالكرة الطائرة

Tournament details
- Host country: Jordan
- City: Amman
- Dates: 1–8 September 2026
- Teams: 4 (from 1 confederation)
- Venue: 1 (in 1 host city)

Final positions
- Champions: Lebanon (3rd title)
- Runners-up: Jordan
- Third place: Iraq
- Fourth place: Qatar

Tournament statistics
- Matches played: 6

The 2026 WAVA Women's Volleyball Championship is the third edition of the West Asian Women's Volleyball Championship, the international volleyball championship organised by WAVA for the women's national teams of West Asia. Its being held in Amman, Jordan from 1 to 8 September 2026.

Lebanon are the two-time defending champions, having won the previous two editions undefeated.

== Participating teams ==
Four (of the 12) member associations entered teams for this edition, the lowest number in history.

Team	Previous appearances			Previous best performance	WR (Note: World ranking at start of tournament.)
Team	Total	First	Last	Previous best performance	WR
Iraq	2	2022	2025	Third place (2025)	98
Jordan	2	2022	2025	Runners-up (2022, 2025)	NR
Lebanon	2	2022	2025	Champions (2022, 2025)	123
Qatar	2	2022	2025	Sixth place (2025)	NR

Did not enter

- Bahrain
- Kuwait
- Oman
- Palestine
- Saudi Arabia
- Syria
- United Arab Emirates
- Yemen

=== Squads ===
Iraq; Doreen Romel; Moreen Sabri; Hamisha Hoshyar; Norma Muneer; Vanest Bryar; Dashne Qasim; Rakela Kameran; Helin Omer; Qamar Hayder; Fatimah Raad; Doris Romel; Gloria Ghassan; Daniela Najem; Kazhin Jalal	Jordan; Rand Haimur; Farah Al-Atout; Rahaf Haimur; Nancy Ayyash; Masa Al-Khatib; Tala Abu Zaid; Ragad Haimur; Shahed Al Awamleh; Yasmina Hinnawi; Dana Mashaleh; Ghayda'a Al-Ashoush; Batoul Abdallah; Lama Al Nashashibi; Angelina Mubarak	Lebanon; Iman Safa; Karen Moukarzel; Serena Shehada; Mira Adra; Mirna Cheikho; Marie Youssef; Lara Al Nahi; Yulia Al Rayess; Lea El Chabib; Yasmine Damerji; Lynn Zaouk; Hanane El Lababidi; Lina Jrad	Qatar; Lamis Al-Salman; Aisha Al-Alawi; Dana Aboueita; Nelly Shalaby; Meriem Mouhoub; Ludan Eisa; Damla Yagmur; Al-Mayasa Deyab; Sumaia Al-Madhoun; Lujain Mahmoud; Tasneem Ali; Shadia Ali; Janna Mabrouk; Penda Gadiaga

== Standings ==
Pos	Team	Pld	W	L	Pts	SW	SL	SR	SPW	SPL	SPR
1	Lebanon	3	3	0	8	9	2	4.500	235	195	1.205
2	Jordan (H)	3	2	1	6	6	3	2.000	205	184	1.114
3	Iraq	3	1	2	4	5	6	0.833	229	232	0.987
4	Qatar	3	0	3	0	0	9	0.000	147	225	0.653

Source: WAVA
(H) Host

== Results ==
All times are local, AST (UTC+3). All matches are held at Sports Palace Hall in Amman.

3 September 2026; 16:00	Lebanon	3–2	Iraq	Sports Palace Hall, Amman
3 September 2026; 16:00	(14–25, 25–22, 25–14, 26–28, 15–7)			Sports Palace Hall, Amman

3 September 2026; 18:00	Jordan	3–0	Qatar	Sports Palace Hall, Amman; Referees: Mohanad Khairullah (IRQ),
3 September 2026; 18:00	(25–16, 25–23, 25–12)			Sports Palace Hall, Amman; Referees: Mohanad Khairullah (IRQ),

5 September 2026; 16:00	Iraq	3–0	Qatar	Sports Palace Hall, Amman
5 September 2026; 16:00	(25–13, 25–18, 25–21)			Sports Palace Hall, Amman

5 September 2026; 18:00	Lebanon	3–0	Jordan	Sports Palace Hall, Amman
5 September 2026; 18:00	(25–17, 25–21, 25–17)			Sports Palace Hall, Amman

7 September 2026; 16:00	Qatar	0–3	Lebanon	Sports Palace Hall, Amman
7 September 2026; 16:00	(6–25, 19–25, 19–25)			Sports Palace Hall, Amman

7 September 2026; 18:00	Iraq	0–3	Jordan	Sports Palace Hall, Amman
7 September 2026; 18:00	(16–25, 21–25, 21–25)			Sports Palace Hall, Amman

== Final standing ==
Rank	Team
1st place, gold medalist(s)	Lebanon
2nd place, silver medalist(s)	Jordan
3rd place, bronze medalist(s)	Iraq
4	Qatar

Qualified for the 2027 AVC Cup
