= West Asian Women's Volleyball Championship =

Volleyball tournament

- Most recent season or competition: 2026 WAVA Women's Volleyball Championship
- Sport: Volleyball
- Founded: 2022; 4 years ago
- First season: 2022
- No. of teams: 12 (maximum)
- Continent: West Asia (AVC)
- Most recent champions: Lebanon (3rd title)
- Most titles: Lebanon (3 titles)

The West Asian Women's Volleyball Championship, officially called the WAVA Women's Volleyball Championship (Arabic: بطولة غرب آسيا لمنتخبات السيدات للكرة الطائرة), is an international volleyball competition contested by the senior women's national teams of the members of West Asian Volleyball Association (WAVA), the sport's governing body in West Asia.

Lebanon are the reigning two-time champions and the only nation to have won the title.

== History ==
=== Background ===
Historically lagging behind other Asian regions in women's volleyball, West Asia has never seen its national teams participate in the Asian Women's Volleyball Championship, despite the existence of women's teams across the region. The lack of competitive opportunities meant that players could not gain international experience or develop their skills against stronger opponents, creating a barrier to the growth of the sport locally. To address this, a regional championship was established in 2022, offering West Asian teams a platform to compete at the international level, foster the development of the game, and prepare for eventual participation alongside Asia's top sides in continental competitions.

=== Inception ===
Jordan hosted the inaugural edition in Amman from 13 to 24 November 2022, featuring a record participation of 10 out of 12 eligible teams. The 11-day competition concluded with Lebanon claiming the inaugural title undefeated, securing victory over the hosts in the final. In October 2025, Jordan was once again chosen to host the second edition, held three years after the inaugural tournament. For the first time in the region, the champions earned qualification for the Asian Championship. Lebanon reinforced their dominance by securing their second consecutive title.

== Results summary ==
Year	Host	Final			3rd place match			Teams
Year	Host	Champions	Score	Runners-up	3rd place	Score	4th place	Teams
2022; Details	Jordan	Lebanon	3–0	Jordan	United Arab Emirates	3–2	Iraq	10
2025; Details	Jordan	Lebanon	Round-robin	Jordan	Iraq	Round-robin	Syria	6
2026; Details	Jordan	Lebanon	Round-robin	Jordan	Iraq	Round-robin	Qatar	4

== Comprehensive team results by tournament ==
Legend

- 1st — Champions
- 2nd — Runners-up
- 3rd — Third place
- 4th — Fourth place
- × — Did not enter / Withdrew
- — Hosts
- P – Confirmed participation in the upcoming tournament

For each tournament, the flag of the host country and the number of teams in each finals tournament (in brackets) are shown.

Team	2022 (Jordan) (10)	2025 (Jordan) (6)	Total
Bahrain	×	×	0
Iraq	4th	3rd	2
Jordan	2nd	2nd	2
Kuwait	5th	×	1
Lebanon	1st	1st	2
Oman	9th	×	1
Palestine	10th	×	1
Qatar	8th	6th	2
Saudi Arabia	7th	5th	2
Syria	6th	4th	2
United Arab Emirates	3rd	×	1
Yemen	×	×	0

== Medals summary ==
Rank	Nation	Gold	Silver	Bronze	Total
1	Lebanon	3	0	0	3
2	Jordan	0	3	0	3
3	Iraq	0	0	2	2
4	United Arab Emirates	0	0	1	1
Totals (4 entries)		3	3	3	9

== Awards ==
Tournament	Best Setter	Best OH	Best MB	Best OPP	Best Libero	MVP
(Jordan) Amman 2022	Iman Safa (LBN)	Zeina Al-Taher (JOR); Asma Al-Muntaser (UAE)	Nadwa Al-Sawan (UAE); Dalia Wadi (JOR)	Andrea Abi Saab (LBN)	Lauren Marzina (IRQ)	Mirna Cheikho (LBN)

== See also ==
- Asian Eastern Zonal Women's Volleyball Championship
- CAVA Women's Volleyball Nations League
