= Jordan women's national volleyball team =

Jordan
- Association: Jordan Volleyball Federation
- Confederation: AVC
- Head coach: (Egypt) Hassan El Hossary
- FIVB ranking: NR (24 May 2026)

Uniforms
Home	Away
- www.jvf.jo
Honours
Arab Games
Bronze medal – third place	2023 Algeria
West Asian Championship
Silver medal – second place	2022 Amman
Silver medal – second place	2025 Amman	Squad

The Jordan women's national volleyball team (Arabic: منتخب الأردن الوطني لكرة الطائرة للسيدات), nicknamed Al-Nashmeyat (lit. The Chivalrous), the team represents the Hashemite Kingdom of Jordan in international women's volleyball competitions and friendly matches, and is controlled by the Jordan Volleyball Federation (JVF), the governing body for volleyball in Jordan.

== History ==
Jordan became the first Arab Asian team to attempt qualification for the FIVB Women's Volleyball World Championship in 2006, entering the first round of AVC qualification, where they were defeated by all four teams in their group.

In November 2022, Jordan hosted the inaugural West Asian Championship in Amman. The team topped its pool with an unbeaten record, then won its quarter-final and semi-final matches before losing to Lebanon in straight sets in the final to finish as runners-up.

In July 2023, Al-Nashmiyat participated in the women's tournament at the 2023 Arab Games in Algeria for the first time in over 20 years. In which they secured their first medal in the category by defeating the United Arab Emirates in a five-set thriller to claim the bronze.

== Team ==
- Head Coach : (Egypt) Hassan El Hossary

The following is the Jordan roster for the 2025 WAVA Women's Volleyball Championship.

No.	Name	Position	Date of birth	Height	Club
1	Ghayd'a Al-Ashoush	OH	16 December 2009 (age 16)	—	(Jordan) Al-Naser Club
2	Rand Haimour	L	15 March 2002 (age 24)	—	(Jordan) Al-Naser Club
3	Ragad Haimur	S	15 March 2002 (age 24)	—	(Jordan) Al-Naser Club
5	Masa Al-Khatib				
8	Celina Haddad			—	(Jordan) Wadi Finan Club
9	Rahaf Abulail		9 March 1998 (age 28)	—	
10	Rahaf Haimour	OH	15 March 2002 (age 24)	—	(Jordan) Al-Naser Club
11	Dana Mashaileh	MB	18 September 2003 (age 22)	—	(Jordan) Al-Naser Club
12	Katrina Haddad			—	(Jordan) Wadi Finan Club
13	Shahed Al-Awamleh	MB	13 July 2005 (age 21)	—	(Jordan) Al-Naser Club
14	Yasmina Al-Hanawi				
15	Tamara Hazem		30 October 1998 (age 27)	—	
19	Haya Kardan	MB	2 December 2000 (age 25)	—	(Jordan) Al-Naser Club
20	Saba Aburizq			—	(Jordan) Al-Naser Club

== Competitive record ==
=== World Championship ===
Champions Runners up Third place Fourth place

World Championship record
Year	Round	Position	GP	MW	ML	SW	SL
(Japan) 2006	Did not qualify						
Total	0 titles	0/22	—	—	—	—	—

=== West Asian Championship ===
Champions Runners up Third place Fourth place

West Asian Championship record
Year	Round	Position	GP	MW	ML	SW	SL
(Jordan) 2022	Final	Runners-up	7	6	1	18	6
(Jordan) 2025	Round-robin	Runners-up	5	4	1	14	5
(Jordan) 2026	Round-robin	Runners-up	3	2	1	6	3
Total	0 titles	3/3	15	12	3	38	14

=== Arab Games ===
- (Lebanon) 1997 — Did not participate
- (Jordan) 1999 — Unknown
- (Qatar) 2011 — Did not participate
- (Algeria) 2023 — Bronze Medal
