= Volleyball at the 2025 Asian Youth Games =

2025 Asian Youth Games competition

- Venue: Isa Sports City
- Dates: 19–29 October 2025

Volleyball at the 2025 Asian Youth Games was held in Manama, Bahrain from 19 to 29 October 2025 at the Isa Sports City.

== Medalists ==
Event	Gold	Silver	Bronze
Boys	Iran; Mohammad Amin Rahimi; Mohammad Nima Bateni; Hossein Zamani; Amir Mohammad Ramezani; Mirmohammad Mousavi; Mobin Kolasangiani; Amir Naderi; Mehdi Sakhavi; Amir Mohammad Rafieirad; Armin Asiaei; Parsa Gallehdar; Shantia Behnejad	Pakistan; Muhammad Anas; Jabran Amin Jan; Abu Bakar Siddique; Muhammad Yahya; Muhammad Irfan; Muhtad Ali Shah; Faizan Ullah; Khizar Hayat; Ajmal Junaid; Tayyab Khan; Muhammad Talha Mehar; Muhammad Saud	Thailand; Athiwat Kliangsanmuang; Nontapat Krutthamas; Sorasak Phunsanong; Jirawat Kasemsitwasu; Patiphan Ngoenpho; Pakkapong Kwangnok; Krittin Damji; Kittipong Chaisawad; Pariwat Toehem; Kiarttisak Seta; Jirayu Simtama; Thanadon Sillapakorn
Girls	Iran; Ayda Baghernia; Yalda Jafari; Laya Afzouni; Hasti Vahedi; Yasna Ahankoub; Masoumeh Ghadami; Setayesh Hosseini; Negar Hosseini; Ayda Valinejad; Mobina Karimi; Negar Abbasi; Elena Homayounirad	Indonesia; Sulastri Rahma Aulia; Tina Syifa Sabila Salim; Syelomitha Injilia Wongkar; Tazma Aprilia; Syabilla Hilal Ramadhan; Agni Sakina Rahmi; Shakira Ayu Tirta Wijaya; Calista Maya Ersandita; Naisya Pratama Putri; Wa Ode Ardiana; Chelsa Berliana Nurtomo; Azzahra Dwi Febyane	Thailand; Sarutya Aea; Panthita Khongnok; Nattharika Wasan; Supawadee Panwilai; Natthawan Phatthaisong; Sirikarnda Jaidee; Sasithorn Jatta; Wisaruta Sengna; Konkanok Chabamnet; Napatson Pumnin; Sasiwimon Jongjit; Natchaya Tahae

== Medal table ==
Rank	Nation	Gold	Silver	Bronze	Total
1	Iran (IRI)	2	0	0	2
2	Indonesia (INA)	0	1	0	1
2	Pakistan (PAK)	0	1	0	1
4	Thailand (THA)	0	0	2	2
Totals (4 entries)		2	2	2	6

== Results ==
=== Boys ===
==== Preliminary round ====
===== Pool A =====
Pos	Team	Pld	W	L	Pts	SW	SL	SR	SPW	SPL	SPR
1	Pakistan	2	2	0	6	6	0	MAX	151	115	1.313
2	Mongolia	2	1	1	3	3	4	0.750	142	163	0.871
3	Bahrain	2	0	2	0	1	6	0.167	153	168	0.911

Source: Official website

Date	Time		Score		Set 1	Set 2	Set 3	Set 4	Set 5	Total
19 Oct	19:00	Pakistan	3–0	Mongolia	25–22	25–13	25–15			75–50
20 Oct	19:00	Bahrain	0–3	Pakistan	18–25	24–26	23–25			65–76
21 Oct	19:00	Mongolia	3–1	Bahrain	25–20	17–25	25–23	25–20		92–88

===== Pool B =====
Pos	Team	Pld	W	L	Pts	SW	SL	SR	SPW	SPL	SPR
1	Iran	2	2	0	6	6	0	MAX	150	73	2.055
2	China	2	1	1	3	3	4	0.750	135	155	0.871
3	Qatar	2	0	2	0	1	6	0.167	113	170	0.665

Source: Official website

Date	Time		Score		Set 1	Set 2	Set 3	Set 4	Set 5	Total
19 Oct	14:00	China	3–1	Qatar	25–17	20–25	25–22	25–16		95–80
20 Oct	16:30	Iran	3–0	China	25–9	25–12	25–19			75–40
21 Oct	14:00	Qatar	0–3	Iran	12–25	8–25	13–25			33–75

===== Pool C =====
Pos	Team	Pld	W	L	Pts	SW	SL	SR	SPW	SPL	SPR
1	Saudi Arabia	2	2	0	5	6	2	3.000	187	113	1.655
2	Uzbekistan	2	1	1	4	5	3	1.667	188	112	1.679
3	Kazakhstan	2	0	2	0	0	6	0.000	0	150	0.000

Source: Official website

Date	Time		Score		Set 1	Set 2	Set 3	Set 4	Set 5	Total
19 Oct	11:30	Kazakhstan	0–3	Saudi Arabia	0–25	0–25	0–25			0–75
20 Oct	11:30	Uzbekistan	3–0	Kazakhstan	25–0	25–0	25–0			75–0
21 Oct	16:30	Saudi Arabia	3–2	Uzbekistan	25–22	29–31	16–25	27–25	15–10	112–113

===== Pool D =====
Pos	Team	Pld	W	L	Pts	SW	SL	SR	SPW	SPL	SPR
1	Indonesia	2	2	0	6	6	2	3.000	191	165	1.158
2	Thailand	2	1	1	3	4	4	1.000	176	169	1.041
3	Chinese Taipei	2	0	2	0	2	6	0.333	157	190	0.826

Source: Official website

Date	Time		Score		Set 1	Set 2	Set 3	Set 4	Set 5	Total
19 Oct	16:30	Thailand	1–3	Indonesia	25–20	20–25	20–25	17–25		82–95
20 Oct	14:00	Chinese Taipei	1–3	Thailand	25–19	20–25	18–25	11–25		74–94
21 Oct	11:30	Indonesia	3–1	Chinese Taipei	25–20	21–25	25–18	25–20		96–83

==== Classification 9th–12th ====
Semifinals
22 October
Bahrain	3
Kazakhstan	0
22 October
Qatar	0
Chinese Taipei	3

Final 9–10
25 October
Bahrain	2
Chinese Taipei	3
Final 11–12
25 October
Kazakhstan	0
Qatar	3

===== Semifinals =====
Date	Time		Score		Set 1	Set 2	Set 3	Set 4	Set 5	Total
22 Oct	09:30	Bahrain	3–0	Kazakhstan	25–0	25–0	25–0			75–0
22 Oct	12:00	Qatar	0–3	Chinese Taipei	17–25	17–25	16–25			50–75

===== Final 11–12 =====
Date	Time		Score		Set 1	Set 2	Set 3	Set 4	Set 5	Total
25 Oct	14:00	Kazakhstan	0–3	Qatar	0–25	0–25	0–25			0–75

===== Final 9–10 =====
Date	Time		Score		Set 1	Set 2	Set 3	Set 4	Set 5	Total
25 Oct	16:30	Bahrain	2–3	Chinese Taipei	18–25	25–21	13–25	25–21	13–15	94–107

==== Classification 1st–8th ====
- The results and the points of the matches between the same teams that were already played during the preliminary round shall be taken into account for the second round.

===== Pool E =====
Pos	Team	Pld	W	L	Pts	SW	SL	SR	SPW	SPL	SPR
1	Pakistan	3	3	0	9	9	1	9.000	249	187	1.332
2	Saudi Arabia	3	2	1	5	7	6	1.167	302	305	0.990
3	Uzbekistan	3	1	2	4	5	7	0.714	262	268	0.978
4	Mongolia	3	0	3	0	2	9	0.222	224	277	0.809

Source: Official website

Date	Time		Score		Set 1	Set 2	Set 3	Set 4	Set 5	Total
23 Oct	11:30	Pakistan	3–0	Uzbekistan	25–13	25–20	25–18			75–51
23 Oct	14:00	Mongolia	1–3	Saudi Arabia	23–25	30–28	16–25	24–26		93–104
24 Oct	11:30	Mongolia	1–3	Uzbekistan	25–23	19–25	17–25	20–25		81–98
24 Oct	14:00	Pakistan	3–1	Saudi Arabia	25–16	25–21	23–25	26–24		99–86

===== Pool F =====
Pos	Team	Pld	W	L	Pts	SW	SL	SR	SPW	SPL	SPR
1	Iran	3	3	0	9	9	0	MAX	225	142	1.585
2	Indonesia	3	2	1	6	6	4	1.500	227	193	1.176
3	Thailand	3	1	2	3	4	6	0.667	202	203	0.995
4	China	3	0	3	0	0	9	0.000	129	225	0.573

Source: Official website

Date	Time		Score		Set 1	Set 2	Set 3	Set 4	Set 5	Total
23 Oct	16:30	Iran	3–0	Thailand	25–19	25–10	25–16			75–45
23 Oct	19:00	China	0–3	Indonesia	11–25	10–25	15–25			36–75
24 Oct	16:30	China	0–3	Thailand	20–25	19–25	14–25			53–75
24 Oct	19:00	Iran	3–0	Indonesia	25–21	25–16	25–20			75–57

==== Final round ====
Quarterfinals
26 October
Mongolia	1
Iran	3
26 October
Saudi Arabia	0
Thailand	3
26 October
Pakistan	3
China	0
26 October
Uzbekistan	0
Indonesia	3

Semifinals
27 October
Iran	3
Thailand	0
27 October
Pakistan	3
Indonesia	1

Gold medal match
29 October
Iran	3
Pakistan	0
Bronze medal match
29 October
Thailand	3
Indonesia	1

Classification 5th–8th
27 October
Mongolia	3
Saudi Arabia	2
27 October
China	1
Uzbekistan	3

Final 5–6
29 October
Mongolia	1
Uzbekistan	3
Final 7–8
29 October
Saudi Arabia	3
China	1

===== Quarterfinals =====
Date	Time		Score		Set 1	Set 2	Set 3	Set 4	Set 5	Total
26 Oct	11:30	Pakistan	3–0	China	25–12	25–13	25–17			75–42
26 Oct	14:00	Mongolia	1–3	Iran	21–25	25–22	12–25	15–25		73–97
26 Oct	16:30	Saudi Arabia	0–3	Thailand	16–25	22–25	19–25			57–75
26 Oct	19:00	Uzbekistan	0–3	Indonesia	20–25	23–25	18–25			61–75

===== Classification 5th–8th =====
Date	Time		Score		Set 1	Set 2	Set 3	Set 4	Set 5	Total
27 Oct	11:30	Mongolia	3–2	Saudi Arabia	25–19	21–25	25–17	26–28	15–8	112–97
27 Oct	14:00	China	1–3	Uzbekistan	21–25	19–25	25–16	15–25		80–91

===== Semifinals =====
Date	Time		Score		Set 1	Set 2	Set 3	Set 4	Set 5	Total
27 Oct	16:30	Iran	3–0	Thailand	25–10	25–21	25–14			75–45
27 Oct	19:00	Pakistan	3–1	Indonesia	22–25	25–13	25–19	26–24		98–81

===== Final 7–8 =====
Date	Time		Score		Set 1	Set 2	Set 3	Set 4	Set 5	Total
29 Oct	09:30	Saudi Arabia	3–1	China	35–37	25–14	25–12	25–21		110–84

===== Final 5–6 =====
Date	Time		Score		Set 1	Set 2	Set 3	Set 4	Set 5	Total
29 Oct	12:00	Mongolia	1–3	Uzbekistan	16–25	21–25	25–22	16–25		78–97

===== Bronze medal match =====
Date	Time		Score		Set 1	Set 2	Set 3	Set 4	Set 5	Total
29 Oct	14:30	Thailand	3–1	Indonesia	19–25	26–24	25–21	25–21		95–91

===== Gold medal match =====
Date	Time		Score		Set 1	Set 2	Set 3	Set 4	Set 5	Total
29 Oct	17:00	Iran	3–0	Pakistan	25–21	25–23	25–23			75–67

=== Girls ===
==== Preliminary round ====
===== Pool A =====
Pos	Team	Pld	W	L	Pts	SW	SL	SR	SPW	SPL	SPR
1	Iran	2	2	0	6	6	0	MAX	150	24	6.250
2	Qatar	2	1	1	3	3	3	1.000	91	102	0.892
3	Bahrain	2	0	2	0	0	6	0.000	35	150	0.233

Source: Official website

Date	Time		Score		Set 1	Set 2	Set 3	Set 4	Set 5	Total
19 Oct	19:00	Iran	3–0	Qatar	25–6	25–4	25–6			75–16
20 Oct	19:00	Bahrain	0–3	Iran	4–25	2–25	2–25			8–75
21 Oct	19:00	Qatar	3–0	Bahrain	25–8	25–6	25–13			75–27

===== Pool B =====
Pos	Team	Pld	W	L	Pts	SW	SL	SR	SPW	SPL	SPR
1	China	2	2	0	6	6	1	6.000	178	119	1.496
2	Hong Kong	2	1	1	3	4	3	1.333	162	131	1.237
3	Jordan	2	0	2	0	0	6	0.000	60	150	0.400

Source: Official website

Date	Time		Score		Set 1	Set 2	Set 3	Set 4	Set 5	Total
19 Oct	14:00	Hong Kong	3–0	Jordan	25–7	25–7	25–14			75–28
20 Oct	16:30	China	3–1	Hong Kong	25–17	28–30	25–22	25–18		103–87
21 Oct	14:00	Jordan	0–3	China	11–25	10–25	11–25			32–75

===== Pool C =====
Pos	Team	Pld	W	L	Pts	SW	SL	SR	SPW	SPL	SPR
1	Indonesia	2	2	0	6	6	1	6.000	172	82	2.098
2	Chinese Taipei	2	1	1	3	4	3	1.333	157	97	1.619
3	Kazakhstan	2	0	2	0	0	6	0.000	0	150	0.000

Source: Official website

Date	Time		Score		Set 1	Set 2	Set 3	Set 4	Set 5	Total
19 Oct	11:30	Kazakhstan	0–3	Indonesia	0–25	0–25	0–25			0–75
20 Oct	11:30	Chinese Taipei	3–0	Kazakhstan	25–0	25–0	25–0			75–0
21 Oct	16:30	Indonesia	3–1	Chinese Taipei	25–18	25–23	22–25	25–16		97–82

===== Pool D =====
Pos	Team	Pld	W	L	Pts	SW	SL	SR	SPW	SPL	SPR
1	Thailand	2	2	0	6	6	1	6.000	171	133	1.286
2	Philippines	2	1	1	2	3	5	0.600	159	178	0.893
3	South Korea	2	0	2	1	3	6	0.500	183	202	0.906

Source: Official website

Date	Time		Score		Set 1	Set 2	Set 3	Set 4	Set 5	Total
19 Oct	16:30	South Korea	2–3	Philippines	21–25	25–19	22–25	25–22	10–15	103–106
20 Oct	14:00	Thailand	3–1	South Korea	25–17	21–25	25–22	25–16		96–80
21 Oct	11:30	Philippines	0–3	Thailand	21–25	18–25	14–25			53–75

==== Classification 9th–12th ====
Semifinals
22 October
Bahrain	3
Kazakhstan	0
22 October
Jordan	0
South Korea	3

Final 9–10
25 October
Bahrain	0
South Korea	3
Final 11–12
25 October
Kazakhstan	0
Jordan	3

===== Semifinals =====
Date	Time		Score		Set 1	Set 2	Set 3	Set 4	Set 5	Total
22 Oct	09:30	Bahrain	3–0	Kazakhstan	25–0	25–0	25–0			75–0
22 Oct	12:00	Jordan	0–3	South Korea	9–25	4–25	8–25			21–75

===== Final 11–12 =====
Date	Time		Score		Set 1	Set 2	Set 3	Set 4	Set 5	Total
25 Oct	14:00	Kazakhstan	0–3	Jordan	0–25	0–25	0–25			0–75

===== Final 9–10 =====
Date	Time		Score		Set 1	Set 2	Set 3	Set 4	Set 5	Total
25 Oct	16:30	Bahrain	0–3	South Korea	6–25	4–25	2–25			12–75

==== Classification 1st–8th ====
- The results and the points of the matches between the same teams that were already played during the preliminary round shall be taken into account for the second round.

===== Pool E =====
Pos	Team	Pld	W	L	Pts	SW	SL	SR	SPW	SPL	SPR
1	Iran	3	3	0	9	9	1	9.000	249	151	1.649
2	Indonesia	3	2	1	6	6	4	1.500	233	170	1.371
3	Chinese Taipei	3	1	2	3	5	6	0.833	231	219	1.055
4	Qatar	3	0	3	0	0	9	0.000	52	225	0.231

Source: Official website

Date	Time		Score		Set 1	Set 2	Set 3	Set 4	Set 5	Total
23 Oct	11:30	Iran	3–1	Chinese Taipei	25–13	24–26	25–20	25–15		99–74
23 Oct	14:00	Qatar	0–3	Indonesia	6–25	5–25	2–25			13–75
24 Oct	11:30	Qatar	0–3	Chinese Taipei	6–25	7–25	10–25			23–75
24 Oct	14:00	Iran	3–0	Indonesia	25–18	25–21	25–22			75–61

===== Pool F =====
Pos	Team	Pld	W	L	Pts	SW	SL	SR	SPW	SPL	SPR
1	Thailand	3	3	0	9	9	0	MAX	225	142	1.585
2	Philippines	3	2	1	6	6	3	2.000	206	185	1.114
3	China	3	1	2	3	3	7	0.429	208	237	0.878
4	Hong Kong	3	0	3	0	1	9	0.111	181	256	0.707

Source: Official website

Date	Time		Score		Set 1	Set 2	Set 3	Set 4	Set 5	Total
23 Oct	16:30	China	0–3	Philippines	20–25	18–25	20–25			58–75
23 Oct	19:00	Hong Kong	0–3	Thailand	17–25	15–25	10–25			42–75
24 Oct	16:30	Hong Kong	0–3	Philippines	15–25	26–28	11–25			52–78
24 Oct	19:00	China	0–3	Thailand	18–25	12–25	17–25			47–75

==== Final round ====
Quarterfinals
26 October
Qatar	0
Thailand	3
26 October
Indonesia	3
China	0
26 October
Iran	3
Hong Kong	0
26 October
Chinese Taipei	1
Philippines	3

Semifinals
27 October
Thailand	0
Indonesia	3
27 October
Iran	3
Philippines	1

Gold medal match
29 October
Indonesia	2
Iran	3
Bronze medal match
29 October
Thailand	3
Philippines	0

Classification 5th–8th
27 October
Qatar	0
China	3
27 October
Hong Kong	1
Chinese Taipei	3

Final 5–6
29 October
China	3
Chinese Taipei	0
Final 7–8
29 October
Qatar	0
Hong Kong	3

===== Quarterfinals =====
Date	Time		Score		Set 1	Set 2	Set 3	Set 4	Set 5	Total
26 Oct	11:30	Iran	3–0	Hong Kong	25–14	25–13	25–18			75–45
26 Oct	14:00	Qatar	0–3	Thailand	5–25	5–25	8–25			18–75
26 Oct	16:30	Indonesia	3–0	China	25–21	25–18	25–20			75–59
26 Oct	19:00	Chinese Taipei	1–3	Philippines	15–25	25–20	16–25	18–25		74–95

===== Classification 5th–8th =====
Date	Time		Score		Set 1	Set 2	Set 3	Set 4	Set 5	Total
27 Oct	11:30	Qatar	0–3	China	5–25	5–25	5–25			15–75
27 Oct	14:00	Hong Kong	1–3	Chinese Taipei	25–27	19–25	25–23	20–25		89–100

===== Semifinals =====
Date	Time		Score		Set 1	Set 2	Set 3	Set 4	Set 5	Total
27 Oct	16:30	Thailand	0–3	Indonesia	24–26	25–27	17–25			66–78
27 Oct	19:00	Iran	3–1	Philippines	26–28	25–18	25–19	25–18		101–83

===== Final 7–8 =====
Date	Time		Score		Set 1	Set 2	Set 3	Set 4	Set 5	Total
29 Oct	09:30	Qatar	0–3	Hong Kong	9–25	9–25	8–25			26–75

===== Final 5–6 =====
Date	Time		Score		Set 1	Set 2	Set 3	Set 4	Set 5	Total
29 Oct	12:00	China	3–0	Chinese Taipei	25–22	25–22	25–21			75–65

===== Bronze medal match =====
Date	Time		Score		Set 1	Set 2	Set 3	Set 4	Set 5	Total
29 Oct	14:30	Thailand	3–0	Philippines	26–24	25–20	26–24			77–68

===== Gold medal match =====
Date	Time		Score		Set 1	Set 2	Set 3	Set 4	Set 5	Total
29 Oct	17:00	Indonesia	2–3	Iran	26–28	25–20	25–18	17–25	14–16	107–107
