= Volleyball at the 2011 Arab Games – Women's tournament =

The women's volleyball tournament at the 2011 Pan Arab Games was held in Doha, Qatar from December 10 to 21, 2011. In this women's 5 teams participated.

== Final round ==
Pos	Team	Pld	W	L	Pts	SPW	SPL	SPR	SW	SL	SR
1	Egypt	4	4	0	8	322	174	1.851	12	1	12.000
2	Algeria	4	3	1	7	312	171	1.825	10	3	3.333
3	United Arab Emirates	4	2	2	6	218	207	1.053	6	6	1.000
4	Kuwait	4	1	3	5	169	313	0.540	3	10	0.300
5	Qatar	4	0	4	4	167	323	0.517	1	12	0.083

Date	Time		Score		Set 1	Set 2	Set 3	Set 4	Set 5	Total
12 Dec	13:00	United Arab Emirates	3–0	Kuwait	25–9	25–4	25–8			75–21
12 Dec	15:00	Egypt	3–0	Qatar	25–7	25–10	25–10			75–27
14 Dec	13:00	United Arab Emirates	0–3	Egypt	18–25	3–25	14–25			35–75
14 Dec	15:00	Algeria	3–0	Qatar	25–7	25–4	25–5			75–16
16 Dec	13:00	United Arab Emirates	0–3	Algeria	8–25	14–25	11–25			33–75
16 Dec	15:00	Egypt	3–0	Kuwait	25–7	25–7	25–11			75–25
18 Dec	12:00	Kuwait	0–3	Algeria	9-25	11-25	5-25			25-75
18 Dec	14:00	Qatar	0–3	United Arab Emirates	18-20	10-25	8-25			36-75
21 Dec	17:00	Qatar	1–3	Kuwait	25-23	21-25	21-25	21-25		88-98
21 Dec	19:00	Algeria	1–3	Egypt	25-22	23-25	19-25	20-25		87-97

== Final standing ==
Rank	Team
1st place, gold medalist(s)	Egypt
2nd place, silver medalist(s)	Algeria
3rd place, bronze medalist(s)	United Arab Emirates
4	Kuwait
5	Qatar
