= 2025 WAVA Women's Volleyball Championship =

International indoor volleyball tournament

بطولة غرب آسيا الثانية لمنتخبات السيدات بالكرة الطائرة
- Official logo

Tournament details
- Host country: Jordan
- City: Amman
- Dates: 1–11 October 2025
- Teams: 6 (from 1 confederation)
- Venue: 1 (in 1 host city)

Final positions
- Champions: Lebanon (2nd title)
- Runners-up: Jordan
- Third place: Iraq
- Fourth place: Syria

Tournament awards
- Best Setter: (Lebanon) Karen Moukarzel
- Best OH: (Lebanon) Mira Adra (Lebanon) Mirna Cheikho
- Best MB: (Jordan) Shahed Al-Awamleh (Iraq) Doreen Romel
- Best OPP: (Lebanon) Shantalle Demirjian
- Best Libero: (Jordan) Rand Haimour

Tournament statistics
- Matches played: 15

The 2025 WAVA Women's Volleyball Championship was the second staging of the WAVA Women's Volleyball Championship, the international volleyball championship organised by WAVA for the women's national teams of West Asia. It was held in Amman, Jordan from 1 to 11 October 2025.

Lebanon entered the tournament as the defending champions, having defeated hosts Jordan in the previous edition's final. and they successfully retained their title, winning a second consecutive championship and remaining unbeaten since the competition's inauguration.

== Participation ==
6 (of 12) WAVA members entered the tournament.

Team	Previous appearances			Previous best performance
Team	Total	First	Last	Previous best performance
Iraq	1	2022		4th place (2022)
Jordan	1	2022		Runners-up (2022)
Lebanon	1	2022		Champions (2022)
Qatar	1	2022		8th place (2022)
Saudi Arabia	1	2022		7th place (2022)
Syria	1	2022		6th place (2022)

Did not enter

- Bahrain
- Kuwait
- Oman
- Palestine
- United Arab Emirates
- Yemen

=== Draw ===
The tournament draw was conducted via video conference from the WAVA headquarters in Doha on 23 September 2025 to determine the teams' positions for the matchups.

=== Squads ===
Iraq; Doreen Romel; Amanda Adwer; Priva Rzgar; Helen Omer; Bahra Hamid; Violet Yokhanna; Veneesia Eshaq; Dashne Qasim; Norma Muneer; Diya Wali; Hamisha Hoshyar; Daniela Najem; Kazhin Jalal; Moreen Sabri	Jordan; Ghayda'a Al-Ashoush; Rand Haimur; Ragad Haimur; Masa Al-Khatib; Celina Haddad; Rahaf Abulail; Rahaf Haimur; Dana Al-Mashaileh; Katrina Haddad; Shahed Al-Awamleh; Yasmina Al-Hinnawi; Tamara Jaber; Haya Kardan; Saba Abu Rezeq	Lebanon; Lina Jrad; Hanane Lababidi; Mira Adra; Mariella Jreidi; Lynn Zaouk; Lara Al-Nahi; Mirna Cheikho; Aya-Maria Matar; Nour Abi Chahine; Lucciana Bassil; Shantalle Demirjian; Lea Chebib; Karen Moukarzel; Yasmine Damerji	Qatar; Lamis Al-Salman; Aisha Al-Alawi; Dana Aboueita; Malak Mohd Hashim; Huda Al-Mobark; Sheqaf Ismail; Sarah Saadawi; Ludan Eisa; Marwa Bettihthamou; Al-Mayasa Deyab; Swaralasal Jbarah; Tasneem Ali	Saudi Arabia; Yara Al-Faraidy; Yara As-Suhebani; Ragad Rajab; Sara Ghouth; Haneen Al-Dukhayel; Rana Al-Sharif; Noha Emran; Tala Al-Oufi; Fai Al-Mohsen; Nadeen Al-Khateeb; Ghala Al-Humaidan; Lugain Al-Qahtani; Joud Al-Kheraif	Syria; Al-Zahraa Mene; Walaa Al-Haj Khalouf; Hanin Shahin; Malak Abo Khalil; Nenar Al-Haj Hussen; Karla Najjar; Luiza Moussa; Ghazal Al-Kaseer; Sally Hammadeh; Maguy Al-Shaiki; Hind Daaboul; Lama Al-Batal

== Standings ==
Pos	Team	Pld	W	L	Pts	SW	SL	SR	SPW	SPL	SPR
1	Lebanon	5	5	0	14	15	3	5.000	435	326	1.334
2	Jordan (H)	5	4	1	12	14	5	2.800	434	357	1.216
3	Iraq	5	3	2	9	10	6	1.667	369	298	1.238
4	Syria	5	2	3	7	8	9	0.889	365	325	1.123
5	Saudi Arabia	5	1	4	3	3	13	0.231	254	381	0.667
6	Qatar	5	0	5	0	1	15	0.067	224	394	0.569

Source: WAVA
(H) Host

== Results ==
All times are local, AST (UTC+3). All matches will be held at Princess Sumaya Hall in Amman

Date	Time		Score		Set 1	Set 2	Set 3	Set 4	Set 5	Total	Report
3 Oct	15:00	Lebanon	3–0	Syria	25–15	25–23	25–23			75–61	
3 Oct	17:00	Saudi Arabia	0–3	Iraq	8–25	11–25	17–25			36–75	
3 Oct	19:00	Qatar	0–3	Jordan	12–25	10–25	13–25			35–75	
4 Oct	15:00	Syria	3–0	Saudi Arabia	25–13	25–10	25–18			75–41	
4 Oct	17:00	Iraq	3–0	Qatar	25–14	25–5	25–13			75–32	
4 Oct	19:00	Jordan	2–3	Lebanon	27–25	21–25	22–25	25–23	11–15	106–113	
6 Oct	15:00	Qatar	1–3	Saudi Arabia	25–19	20–25	13–25	23–25		81–94	
6 Oct	17:00	Lebanon	3–1	Iraq	22–25	25–15	25–21	25–16		97–77	
6 Oct	19:00	Jordan	3–2	Syria	25–23	21–25	14–25	25–17	15–9	100–99	
7 Oct	15:00	Lebanon	3–0	Qatar	25–10	25–15	25–17			75–42	
7 Oct	17:00	Syria	0–3	Iraq	18–25	16–25	21–25			55–75	
7 Oct	19:00	Jordan	3–0	Saudi Arabia	25–13	25–15	25–15			75–43	
9 Oct	15:00	Qatar	0–3	Syria	14–25	10–25	10–25			34–75	
9 Oct	17:00	Saudi Arabia	0–3	Lebanon	14–25	13–25	13–25			40–75	
9 Oct	19:00	Iraq	0–3	Jordan	25–27	18–25	24–26			67–78	

== Final standing ==
Rank	Team
1st place, gold medalist(s)	Lebanon
2nd place, silver medalist(s)	Jordan
3rd place, bronze medalist(s)	Iraq
4	Syria
5	Saudi Arabia
6	Qatar

Qualified for the 2026 AVC Cup
Qualified for the 2026 AVC Continental Championship
