= Iraqi Women's Volleyball League =

- Current season, competition or edition: 2025–26 Iraqi League
- Sport: Volleyball
- First season: 2009; 17 years ago
- Administrator: IVF
- No. of teams: 10 teams
- Country: Iraq
- Confederation: AVC
- Continent: Asia
- Most recent champion: Sanharib Club (2nd title) (2024–25)
- Most titles: Qaraqosh Sports Club / Akkad Ankawa (6 titles)
- Level on pyramid: Level 1
- Relegation to: National 2
- Domestic cups: Iraq Cup; Iraq Super Cup
- International cups: AVC Champions League; Arab Clubs Championship

The Iraqi Women's Volleyball Premier League ( Arabic : الدوري العراقي الممتاز للكرة الطائرة للسيدات ) is the highest level of women's club volleyball in Iraq. Established in 2009, the league has become the country's premier domestic competition, playing a key role in the growth and development of women's volleyball. Organized by the Iraqi Volleyball Federation (IVF)—the sport's national governing body founded in 1959. The league features 10 clubs from across Iraq, competing in a structured championship that typically includes preliminary group-stage matches followed by knockout rounds and a championship final. Since the league began, Qaraqosh Sports Club and Akkad Ankawa have been the most successful clubs, with six league titles each. Sanharib Club Volley has won two championships, while Aphrodite Sports Club has won one title. These clubs have been among the league's strongest teams and have played a major role in its history.

== Titles by Clubs ==
Rank	Club	Titles
1	Qaraqosh Sports Club	6
1	Akkad Ankawa	6
3	Sanharib Club Volley	2
4	Aphrodite Sports Club	1

== Winners list ==
Season	Champion
2025–26	
2024–25	Sanharib Club Volley
2023–24	Akkad Ankawa
2022–23	Akkad Ankawa

Season	Champion
2021–22	Sanharib Club Volley
2020–21	Aphrodite Sports Club
2019–20	Qaraqosh Sports Club
2018–19	Qaraqosh Sports Club
2016–17	Qaraqosh Sports Club
2015–16	Qaraqosh Sports Club

Season	Champion
2014–15	Qaraqosh Sports Club
2013–14	Qaraqosh Sports Club
2012–13	Akkad Ankawa
2011–12	Akkad Ankawa
2010–11	Akkad Ankawa
2009–10	Akkad Ankawa

Sources :
