= Saudi Arabian Men's Volleyball League =

- Current season, competition or edition: 2024–25 Saudi League
- Sport: Volleyball
- First season: 1978; 48 years ago
- Administrator: SAVA
- No. of teams: 12 teams
- Country: Saudi Arabia
- Confederation: AVC
- Continent: Asia
- Most recent champion: Al Hilal Riyadh (20th titles) (2024–25)
- Most titles: Al Ahli Jeddah (25 titles)
- Level on pyramid: Level 1
- Relegation to: National 2
- Domestic cups: Saudi Cup; Saudi Super Cup
- International cups: AVC Champions League; Arab Clubs Championship

The Saudi Arabian Volleyball Super League ( Arabic : الدوري السعودي الممتاز لكرة الطائرة ) is the highest level of men's volleyball in Saudi Arabia Since 1978/79 and it is organized by the Saudi Arabia Volleyball Association. The Saudi Super Volleyball League is currently contested by 12 clubs around the country as of the last season Played 2023–24.

The League played as a regular season by a total of 12 teams, playing each other twice, once at home and once away from home. After that the champion defined by the team with the most points and the last two teams were automatically relegated to the second division.

== Teams by Titles ==
Rank	Team	Titles
1	Al Ahli Jeddah	25
2	Al Hilal Riyadh	20
3	Al Ittihad Jeddah	1
4	Al Muheet SC	1

== Winners list ==
Year	Champion
1978–79	Al Ahli Jeddah
1979–80	Al Ahli Jeddah
1980–81	Al Ittihad Jeddah
1981–82	Al Hilal Riyadh
1982–83	Al Ahli Jeddah
1983–84	Al Ahli Jeddah
1984–85	Al Ahli Jeddah
1985–86	Al Ahli Jeddah
1986–87	Al Ahli Jeddah
1987–88	Al Ahli Jeddah
1988–89	Al Ahli Jeddah
1989–90	Al Muheet SC
1990–91	Al Ahli Jeddah
1991–92	Al Ahli Jeddah
1992–93	Al Ahli Jeddah
1993–94	Al Hilal Riyadh

Year	Champion
1994–95	Al Ahli Jeddah
1995–96	Al Hilal Riyadh
1996–97	Al Hilal Riyadh
1997–98	Al Hilal Riyadh
1998–99	Al Ahli Jeddah
1999–2000	Al Ahli Jeddah
2000–01	Al Ahli Jeddah
2001–02	Al Ahli Jeddah
2002–03	Al Ahli Jeddah
2003–04	Al Hilal Riyadh
2004–05	Al Hilal Riyadh
2005–06	Al Hilal Riyadh
2006–07	Al Hilal Riyadh
2007–08	Al Ahli Jeddah
2008–09	Al Hilal Riyadh
2009–10	Al Hilal Riyadh

Year	Champion
2010–11	Al Hilal Riyadh
2011–12	Al Hilal Riyadh
2012–13	Al Ahli Jeddah
2013–14	Al Ahli Jeddah
2014–15	Al Ahli Jeddah
2015–16	Al Hilal Riyadh
2016–17	Al Hilal Riyadh
2017–18	Al Hilal Riyadh
2018–19	Al Hilal Riyadh
2019–20	Al Ahli Jeddah
2020–21	Al Hilal Riyadh
2021–22	Al Ahli Jeddah
2022–23	Al Ahli Jeddah
2023–24	Al Hilal Riyadh
2024–25	Al Hilal Riyadh
2025–26	in progress
