= Volleyball at the 2009 Summer Universiade – Men's tournament =

The men's tournament of volleyball at the 2009 Summer Universiade at Belgrade, Serbia began on July 1 and ended on July 11.

== Teams ==
Africa	Americas	Asia	Europe	Oceania	Automatic qualifiers
Egypt; South Africa	Brazil; Canada	China; Japan; Hong Kong; Lebanon; South Korea; United Arab Emirates	Czech Republic; Germany; Great Britain; Montenegro; Poland; Russia; Slovenia; Sweden; Switzerland; Turkey; Ukraine	Australia	Serbia– Universiade hosts

== Preliminary round ==
=== Group A ===
Pos	Team	Pld	W	L	Pts	SPW	SPL	SPR	SW	SL	SR
1	Russia	5	5	0	10	377	252	1.496	15	0	MAX
2	Serbia	5	4	1	9	413	316	1.307	12	5	2.400
3	South Korea	5	3	2	8	392	344	1.140	10	8	1.250
4	Sweden	5	2	3	7	370	367	1.008	9	9	1.000
5	South Africa	5	1	4	6	230	363	0.634	3	12	0.250
6	Lebanon	5	0	5	5	237	377	0.629	0	15	0.000

Date		Score		Set 1	Set 2	Set 3	Set 4	Set 5	Total
2 July	South Africa	0–3	South Korea	13:25	11:25	10:25			34:75
2 July	Sweden	0–3	Russia	12:25	16:25	19:25			47:75
2 July	Serbia	3–0	Lebanon	25:13	25:11	25:14			75:38
3 July	Lebanon	0–3	Sweden	12:25	20:25	16:25			48:75
3 July	South Korea	0–3	Russia	18:25	19:25	23:25			60:75
3 July	South Africa	0–3	Serbia	15:25	15:25	14:25			44:75
4 July	Russia	3–0	Lebanon	25:10	25:16	25:14			75:40
4 July	Sweden	3–0	South Africa	25:12	25:7	25:17			75:36
4 July	Serbia	3–1	South Korea	25:14	25:20	22:25	25:15		97:74
5 July	South Africa	0–3	Russia	16:25	10:25	13:25			39:75
5 July	South Korea	3–0	Lebanon	25:17	25:15	25:16			75:48
5 July	Serbia	3–1	Sweden	25:20	25:22	25:27	25:14		100:83
6 July	Lebanon	0–3	South Africa	25:27	17:25	21:25			63:77
6 July	Sweden	2–3	South Korea	20:25	14:25	25:20	25:23	6:15	90:108
6 July	Russia	3–0	Serbia	25:21	25:20	27:25			77:66

=== Group B ===
Pos	Team	Pld	W	L	Pts	SPW	SPL	SPR	SW	SL	SR
1	Brazil	4	4	0	8	305	215	1.419	12	0	MAX
2	Turkey	4	3	1	7	309	286	1.080	9	4	2.250
3	Montenegro	4	2	2	6	359	368	0.976	7	9	0.778
4	Switzerland	4	1	3	5	320	335	0.955	5	10	0.500
5	China	4	0	4	4	253	342	0.740	2	12	0.167

Date		Score		Set 1	Set 2	Set 3	Set 4	Set 5	Total
2 July	Switzerland	3–1	China	21:25	25:15	25:20	25:18		96:78
2 July	Montenegro	0–3	Brazil	28:30	21:25	16:25			65:80
3 July	China	1–3	Montenegro	17:25	19:25	25:21	19:25		80:96
3 July	Turkey	3–0	Switzerland	27:25	25:19	25:19			77:63
4 July	Brazil	3–0	China	25:14	25:14	25:12			75:40
4 July	Montenegro	1–3	Turkey	21:25	25:21	25:27	22:25		93:98
5 July	Turkey	0–3	Brazil	19:25	23:25	17:25			59:75
5 July	Switzerland	2–3	Montenegro	23:25	22:25	25:19	25:19	15:17	110:105
6 July	Brazil	3–0	Switzerland	25:19	25:18	25:14			75:51
6 July	China	0–3	Turkey	19:25	15:25	21:25			55:75

=== Group C ===
Pos	Team	Pld	W	L	Pts	SPW	SPL	SPR	SW	SL	SR
1	Egypt	5	4	1	9	408	297	1.374	14	3	4.667
2	Canada	5	4	1	9	463	393	1.178	14	6	2.333
3	Ukraine	5	3	2	8	389	365	1.066	10	7	1.429
4	Japan	5	3	2	8	379	376	1.008	10	8	1.250
5	Slovenia	5	1	4	6	272	358	0.760	3	12	0.250
6	Great Britain	5	0	5	5	253	375	0.675	0	15	0.000

Date		Score		Set 1	Set 2	Set 3	Set 4	Set 5	Total
2 July	Slovenia	0–3	Egypt	15:25	13:25	16:25			44:75
2 July	Great Britain	0–3	Canada	19:25	14:25	15:25			48:75
2 July	Ukraine	3–1	Japan	19:25	25:21	25:23	25:14		94:83
4 July	Canada	3–0	Slovenia	25:17	25:15	25:16			75:48
4 July	Ukraine	3–0	Great Britain	25:14	25:18	25:17			75:49
4 July	Japan	0–3	Egypt	13:25	15:25	20:25			48:75
5 July	Great Britain	0–3	Japan	15:25	14:25	20:25			49:75
5 July	Egypt	2–3	Canada	25:16	23:25	23:25	25:21	12:15	108:102
5 July	Slovenia	0–3	Ukraine	14:25	21:25	14:25			49:75
6 July	Great Britain	0–3	Slovenia	19:25	18:25	21:25			58:75
6 July	Japan	3–2	Canada	13:25	25:18	25:22	20:25	15:12	98:102
6 July	Ukraine	0–3	Egypt	17:25	19:25	18:25			54:75
7 July	Egypt	3–0	Great Britain	25:19	25:12	25:18			75:49
7 July	Canada	3–1	Ukraine	34:36	25:20	25:20	25:15		109:91
7 July	Slovenia	0–3	Japan	21:25	18:25	17:25			56:75

=== Group D ===
Pos	Team	Pld	W	L	Pts	SPW	SPL	SPR	SW	SL	SR
1	Czech Republic	5	5	0	10	445	365	1.219	15	3	5.000
2	Poland	5	4	1	9	429	329	1.304	13	4	3.250
3	Germany	5	3	2	8	415	360	1.153	12	6	2.000
4	United Arab Emirates	5	2	3	7	380	433	0.878	6	13	0.462
5	Australia	5	1	4	6	355	411	0.864	5	13	0.385
6	Hong Kong	5	0	5	5	301	427	0.705	3	15	0.200

Date		Score		Set 1	Set 2	Set 3	Set 4	Set 5	Total
2 July	Poland	3–0	Hong Kong	25:11	25:10	25:12			75:33
2 July	Czech Republic	3–2	Germany	28:26	22:25	22:25	25:21	15:8	112:105
2 July	Australia	2–3	United Arab Emirates	25:17	21:25	18:25	25:22	14:16	103:105
3 July	Germany	3–0	Hong Kong	25:11	25:11	25:18			75:40
3 July	United Arab Emirates	0–3	Poland	14:25	28:30	17:25			59:80
3 July	Czech Republic	3–0	Australia	25:20	25:18	25:18			75:56
4 July	Hong Kong	2–3	United Arab Emirates	25:22	25:21	22:25	17:25	11:15	100:108
4 July	Australia	0–3	Germany	19:25	21:25	18:25			58:75
4 July	Poland	1–3	Czech Republic	27:25	29:31	25:27	23:25		104:108
6 July	Germany	3–0	United Arab Emirates	25:19	25:13	25:23			75:55
6 July	Czech Republic	3–0	Hong Kong	25:16	25:12	25:19			75:47
6 July	Australia	0–3	Poland	15:25	12:25	17:25			44:75
7 July	Hong Kong	1–3	Australia	23:25	25:19	12:25	21:25		81:94
7 July	United Arab Emirates	0–3	Czech Republic	18:25	21:25	14:25			53:75
7 July	Poland	3–1	Germany	20:25	25:20	25:21	25:19		95:85

== Classification round ==
=== Classification 17-23 places ===
Date		Score		Set 1	Set 2	Set 3	Set 4	Set 5	Total
9 July	South Africa	1–3	Great Britain	29:31	10:25	25:21	22:25		86:102
9 July	Slovenia	3–1	Lebanon	25:14	25:15	22:25	25:18		97:72
9 July	China	1–3	Hong Kong	25:20	21:25	25:27	15:25		86:97

=== Classification 9-16 places ===
Date		Score		Set 1	Set 2	Set 3	Set 4	Set 5	Total
9 July	South Korea	3–2	Japan	25:21	23:25	23:25	25:23	15:8	111:102
9 July	Germany	1–3	Switzerland	25:20	22:25	16:25	27:29		90:99
9 July	Ukraine	3–1	Sweden	25:20	25:17	23:25	25:12		98:74
9 July	Montenegro	3–1	United Arab Emirates	21:25	26:24	25:22	25:17		97:88

=== Classification 21-23 places ===
Date		Score		Set 1	Set 2	Set 3	Set 4	Set 5	Total
10 July	Lebanon	0–3	China	11:25	23:25	19:25			53:75

=== Classification 17-20 places ===
Date		Score		Set 1	Set 2	Set 3	Set 4	Set 5	Total
10 July	Australia	2–3	Great Britain	22:25	25:20	25:20	19:25	17:19	108:109
10 July	Slovenia	3–0	Hong Kong	25:11	25:13	25:22			75:46

=== Classification 13-16 places ===
Date		Score		Set 1	Set 2	Set 3	Set 4	Set 5	Total
10 July	Japan	3–1	Germany	25:22	23:25	25:22	25:16		98:85
10 July	Sweden	3–0	United Arab Emirates	25:17	25;20	25:23			75:60

=== Classification 9-12 places ===
Date		Score		Set 1	Set 2	Set 3	Set 4	Set 5	Total
10 July	South Korea	3–0	Switzerland	25:22	25:21	25:20			75:63
10 July	Ukraine	3–0	Montenegro	25:23	25:21	25:21			75:65

== Quarterfinals ==
Date		Score		Set 1	Set 2	Set 3	Set 4	Set 5	Total
9 July	Egypt	3–1	Serbia	25:17	14:25	25:23	25:15		89:80
9 July	Poland	1–3	Brazil	22:25	20:25	25:22	19:25		86:97
9 July	Turkey	0–3	Czech Republic	19:25	19:25	17:25			55:75
9 July	Russia	3–2	Canada	23:25	19:25	25:18	25:21	15:13	107:102

== Semifinals ==
Date		Score		Set 1	Set 2	Set 3	Set 4	Set 5	Total
10 July	Egypt	2–3	Brazil	25:19	25:22	23:25	26:28	13:15	112:109
10 July	Czech Republic	0–3	Russia	13:25	18:25	22:25			53:75

=== Classification 5-8 places ===
Date		Score		Set 1	Set 2	Set 3	Set 4	Set 5	Total
10 July	Serbia	3–2	Poland	20:25	25:19	21:25	25:16	15:11	106:96
10 July	Turkey	1–3	Canada	25:21	28:30	21:25	27:29		101:105

== Finals ==
=== Classification 21-22 places ===
Date		Score		Set 1	Set 2	Set 3	Set 4	Set 5	Total
11 July	South Africa	3–1	China	23:25	25:23	25:23	25:17		98:88

=== Classification 19-20 places ===
Date		Score		Set 1	Set 2	Set 3	Set 4	Set 5	Total
11 July	Australia	3–1	Hong Kong	21:25	25:19	25:23	25:17		96:84

=== Classification 17-18 places ===
Date		Score		Set 1	Set 2	Set 3	Set 4	Set 5	Total
11 July	Great Britain	1–3	Slovenia	17;25	25:20	18:25	24:26		84:96

=== Classification 15-16 places ===
Date		Score		Set 1	Set 2	Set 3	Set 4	Set 5	Total
11 July	Germany	3–0	United Arab Emirates	25:20	25:18	25:19			75:57

=== Classification 13-14 places ===
Date		Score		Set 1	Set 2	Set 3	Set 4	Set 5	Total
11 July	Japan	3–0	Sweden	25:19	25:17	25:20			75:56

=== Classification 11-12 places ===
Date		Score		Set 1	Set 2	Set 3	Set 4	Set 5	Total
11 July	Switzerland	3–1	Montenegro	25:17	25:19	17:25	25:18		92:79

=== Classification 9-10 places ===
Date		Score		Set 1	Set 2	Set 3	Set 4	Set 5	Total
11 July	South Korea	0–3	Ukraine	13:25	22:25	17:25			52:75

=== Classification 7-8 places ===
Date		Score		Set 1	Set 2	Set 3	Set 4	Set 5	Total
11 July	Poland	3–1	Turkey	29:27	22:25	25:15	25:22		101:89

=== Classification 5-6 places ===
Date		Score		Set 1	Set 2	Set 3	Set 4	Set 5	Total
11 July	Serbia	3–0	Canada	25:16	25:21	25:22			75:61

== Bronze-medal match ==
Date		Score		Set 1	Set 2	Set 3	Set 4	Set 5	Total
11 July	Egypt	3–0	Czech Republic	25:14	25:22	25:22			75:58

== Gold-medal match ==
Date		Score		Set 1	Set 2	Set 3	Set 4	Set 5	Total
11 July	Brazil	0–3	Russia	19:25	22:25	23:25			64:75

== Final standings ==
Place	Team	Score
1st place, gold medalist(s)	Russia	8–0
2nd place, silver medalist(s)	Brazil	6–1
3rd place, bronze medalist(s)	Egypt	6–2
4	Czech Republic	6–2
5	Serbia	6–2
6	Canada	5–3
7	Poland	5–3
8	Turkey	3–4
9	Ukraine	6–2
10	South Korea	5–3
11	Switzerland	3–4
12	Montenegro	3–4
13	Japan	5–3
14	Sweden	3–5
15	Germany	4–4
16	UAE	2–6
17	Slovenia	4–3
18	Great Britain	2–5
19	Australia	2–5
20	Hong Kong	1–7
21	South Africa	2–5
22	China	1–6
23	Lebanon	0–7
