= 2026 AVC Women's Volleyball Cup =

Asian women's volleyball tournament

Tournament details
- Host country: Philippines
- City: Candon
- Dates: 6–14 June
- Teams: 12 (from 1 confederation)
- Venue: 1 (in 1 host city)

Final positions
- Champions: South Korea (1st title)
- Runners-up: Chinese Taipei
- Third place: Vietnam
- Fourth place: Kazakhstan

Tournament awards
- MVP: (South Korea) Kang So-hwi
- Best Setter: (Vietnam) Võ Thị Kim Thoa
- Best OH: (Chinese Taipei) Tsai Yu-chun; (South Korea) Kang So-hwi
- Best MB: (South Korea) Park Eun-jin; (Chinese Taipei) Chen Ciao-en
- Best OPP: (South Korea) Na Hyun-soo
- Best Libero: (Chinese Taipei) Lin Chi-jung

Tournament statistics
- Matches played: 38
- Attendance: 65,656 (1,728 per match)

The 2026 AVC Women's Volleyball Cup was the fifth edition of the AVC Women's Volleyball Cup, an annual international volleyball tournament organized by the Asian Volleyball Confederation (AVC) in cooperation with the ad hoc committee appointed by the Fédération Internationale de Volleyball (FIVB) following the suspension of the Philippine National Volleyball Federation (PNVF). It was held from 6 to 14 June 2026 in Candon, Ilocos Sur, Philippines. This was the Philippines' second time hosting the tournament after Manila hosted the 2024 edition.

South Korea won the tournament for the first time in the history of the competition. Making their tournament debut following a relegation from the Volleyball Nations League the previous season, the South Korean team lost only two sets throughout the event, both in a five-set pool play match against Chinese Taipei. They defeated defending champions Vietnam 3–0 in the semifinals before shutting out Chinese Taipei 3–0 in the final. Team captain Kang So-hwi was named the tournament's MVP.

Chinese Taipei finished as runners-up to claim their first silver medal, following bronze medals in 2023 and 2025. Vietnam, the champions of the previous three editions, won the bronze medal by defeating Kazakhstan 3–0 in the third-place match, securing their fourth podium finish in five years. Vietnamese captain Trần Thị Thanh Thúy was the tournament's top scorer with 105 total points.

== Host selection ==
The hosting rights for the 2026 AVC Women's Volleyball Cup was awarded on 6 September 2025, during the AVC Board of Administration meeting held in AVC House in Bangkok, Thailand. The hosting bid of the Philippines was unanimously voted and approved by the confederation. Candon was named as the host city of the tournament with games to be held at the newly refurbished Candon City Arena. The indoor arena has hosted the first leg of the 2025 SEA Men's V.League and the 2026 Volleyball All-Star Showcase.

== Qualification ==
List of teams: Participating teams in the 2026 FIVB Volleyball Nations League Participating teams in the 2026 AVC Volleyball Cup Did not qualify

A maximum of 12 teams were selected for the AVC Women's Volleyball Cup based on specific qualification criteria. This included one slot reserved for the host country and another for the defending champions from the previous edition, with the runner-up taking the spot if the defending champion happened to be the host nation. Additionally, five teams were selected based on the highest FIVB World Rankings among those that had not yet qualified. The remaining five slots were awarded to teams from zonal tournaments that had not already qualified for the tournament. Furthermore, any teams competing in the FIVB Women's Volleyball Nations League were strictly ineligible to submit entries to this tournament.

The following 12 teams qualified for the tournament, listed by the method of qualification.

| Country | Zone | Qualified as | Qualified on | Previous appearances | | | Previous best performance |
| Country | Zone | Qualified as | Qualified on | Total | First | Last | Previous best performance |
|---|---|---|---|---|---|---|---|
| Philippines | SAVA | Host country (Note: Despite the suspension of the Philippine National Volleyball Federation, the Philippines were still allowed to compete.) | 6 September 2025 | 3 | 2023 | 2025 | Runners-up (2025) |
| Vietnam | SAVA | Defending champions | 14 June 2025 | 3 | 2023 | 2025 | Champions (2023, 2024, 2025) |
| Kazakhstan | CAVA | World Rankings pathway (Note: As China, Japan, and Thailand were ineligible due to competing in the 2026 FIVB Women's Volleyball Nations League, and with Vietnam qualifying as defending champions and the Philippines qualifying as hosts, their ranking slots were reallocated to the next highest-ranked teams.) | 2 February 2026 | 2 | 2024 | 2025 | Runners-up (2024) |
| Chinese Taipei | EAVA | World Rankings pathway | 2 February 2026 | 3 | 2023 | 2025 | 3rd place (2023, 2025) |
| South Korea | EAVA | World Rankings pathway | 2 February 2026 | 0 | None | | Debut |
| Iran | CAVA | World Rankings pathway | 2 February 2026 | 3 | 2023 | 2025 | 5th place (2023) |
| Kyrgyzstan | CAVA | World Rankings pathway | 2 February 2026 | 0 | None | | Debut |
| Uzbekistan | CAVA | 2025 CAVA Championship runners-up (Note: As Iran had already qualified, its slot was reallocated to Uzbekistan.) | 2 February 2026 | 2 | 2022 | 2023 | 4th place (2022) |
| Hong Kong | EAVA | 2025 EAVA Championship 4th placers (Note: As Chinese Taipei and South Korea had already qualified, their slots were reallocated to Hong Kong.) | 2 February 2026 | 4 | 2022 | 2025 | Champions (2022) |
| Australia | OZVA | 2026 OZVA Qualifier champions | 2 February 2026 | 3 | 2023 | 2025 | 4th place (2024) |
| Indonesia | SAVA | 2025 SEA V.League 4th placers (Note: As the Philippines and Vietnam had already qualified, their slots were reallocated to Indonesia.) | 2 February 2026 | 3 | 2023 | 2025 | Runners-up (2023) |
| Lebanon | WAVA | 2025 WAVA Championship champions | 2 February 2026 | 0 | None | | Debut |

== Pools composition ==
The draw of lots took place on 17 April 2026 at the Diamond Hotel in Manila, Philippines led by AVC President Ramon Suzara, with Thea Gagate, and Leila Cruz, who are national team players. Teams were split into two pools with six teams each.

External videos
- [ LIVE ] Drawing of Lots : AVC Women's Cup Candon 2026

=== Seeding ===
| Seeded teams | Pot 1 | Pot 2 | Pot 3 |
|---|---|---|---|
| Philippines (46) (Hosts); Vietnam (28); Kazakhstan (35); Chinese Taipei (37); South Korea (40); Iran (47) | Kyrgyzstan (62); Indonesia (70) | Australia (73); Hong Kong (81) | Uzbekistan (87); Lebanon (–) |

=== Draw results ===
| Pool A | Pool B |
|---|---|
| Philippines | Vietnam |
| Chinese Taipei | Kazakhstan |
| South Korea | Iran |
| Kyrgyzstan | Indonesia |
| Australia | Hong Kong |
| Uzbekistan | Lebanon |

== Venue ==
Candon, Philippines
| Candon City Arena | Location of the venue in Candon, Ilocos Sur 1 Candon City Arena |
| Capacity: 8,000 | Location of the venue in Candon, Ilocos Sur 1 Candon City Arena |

== Pool standing procedure ==
1. Total number of victories (matches won, matches lost)
2. In the event of a tie, the following first tiebreaker will apply: The teams will be ranked by the most point gained per match as follows:
  - Match won 3–0 or 3–1: 3 points for the winner, 0 points for the loser
  - Match won 3–2: 2 points for the winner, 1 point for the loser
  - Match forfeited: 3 points for the winner, 0 points (0–25, 0–25, 0–25) for the loser
3. If teams are still tied after examining the number of victories and points gained, then the AVC will examine the results in order to break the tie in the following order:
  - Set quotient: if two or more teams are tied on the number of points gained, they will be ranked by the quotient resulting from the division of the number of all set won by the number of all sets lost.
  - Points quotient: if the tie persists based on the set quotient, the teams will be ranked by the quotient resulting from the division of all points scored by the total of points lost during all sets.
  - If the tie persists based on the point quotient, the tie will be broken based on the team that won the match of the Round Robin Phase between the tied teams. When the tie in point quotient is between three or more teams, these teams ranked taking into consideration only the matches involving the teams in question.

== Preliminary round ==
- All times are Philippine Standard Time (UTC+08:00).

=== Pool A ===
| Pos | Team | Pld | W | L | Pts | SW | SL | SR | SPW | SPL | SPR | Qualification |
|---|---|---|---|---|---|---|---|---|---|---|---|---|
| 1 | South Korea | 5 | 5 | 0 | 14 | 15 | 2 | 7.500 | 409 | 271 | 1.509 | Semifinals |
| 2 | Chinese Taipei | 5 | 4 | 1 | 13 | 14 | 4 | 3.500 | 421 | 326 | 1.291 | Semifinals |
| 3 | Australia | 5 | 3 | 2 | 8 | 10 | 10 | 1.000 | 447 | 420 | 1.064 | 5th place match |
| 4 | Philippines (H) | 5 | 2 | 3 | 7 | 8 | 9 | 0.889 | 344 | 335 | 1.027 | 7th place match |
| 5 | Uzbekistan | 5 | 1 | 4 | 3 | 4 | 12 | 0.333 | 280 | 380 | 0.737 | 9th place match |
| 6 | Kyrgyzstan | 5 | 0 | 5 | 0 | 1 | 15 | 0.067 | 231 | 400 | 0.578 | 11th place match |

Source: Volleyball World
Rules for classification: Pool standing procedure
(H) Host

| Date | Time | | Score | | Set 1 | Set 2 | Set 3 | Set 4 | Set 5 | Total | Attd | Report |
|---|---|---|---|---|---|---|---|---|---|---|---|---|
| 6 Jun | 15:00 | Philippines | 3–0 | Uzbekistan | 25–16 | 25–12 | 25–14 | | | 75–42 | 2,426 | P2 Boxscore |
| 6 Jun | 21:00 | South Korea | 3–0 | Kyrgyzstan | 25–7 | 25–5 | 25–7 | | | 75–19 | 3,108 | P2 Boxscore |
| 7 Jun | 12:00 | Chinese Taipei | 3–0 | Kyrgyzstan | 25–14 | 25–11 | 25–17 | | | 75–42 | 393 | P2 Boxscore |
| 7 Jun | 15:00 | Philippines | 2–3 | Australia | 22–25 | 25–23 | 25–18 | 15–25 | 11–15 | 98–106 | 2,141 | P2 Boxscore |
| 7 Jun | 21:00 | Uzbekistan | 0–3 | South Korea | 11–25 | 14–25 | 15–25 | | | 40–75 | 3,081 | P2 Boxscore |
| 8 Jun | 15:00 | Philippines | 3–0 | Kyrgyzstan | 25–9 | 25–11 | 25–17 | | | 75–37 | 1,477 | P2 Boxscore |
| 8 Jun | 21:00 | Chinese Taipei | 3–1 | Australia | 25–20 | 17–25 | 25–22 | 25–19 | | 92–86 | 1,545 | P2 Boxscore |
| 9 Jun | 12:00 | Uzbekistan | 0–3 | Chinese Taipei | 17–25 | 13–25 | 19–25 | | | 49–75 | 476 | P2 Boxscore |
| 9 Jun | 15:00 | Philippines | 0–3 | South Korea | 16–25 | 18–25 | 22–25 | | | 56–75 | 2,430 | P2 Boxscore |
| 9 Jun | 21:00 | Kyrgyzstan | 1–3 | Australia | 15–25 | 27–25 | 16–25 | 23–25 | | 81–100 | 970 | P2 Boxscore |
| 11 Jun | 15:00 | Philippines | 0–3 | Chinese Taipei | 16–25 | 14–25 | 10–25 | | | 40–75 | 2,798 | P2 Boxscore |
| 11 Jun | 18:00 | South Korea | 3–0 | Australia | 25–18 | 25–15 | 25–19 | | | 75–52 | 3,467 | P2 Boxscore |
| 11 Jun | 21:00 | Kyrgyzstan | 0–3 | Uzbekistan | 20–25 | 13–25 | 19–25 | | | 52–75 | 600 | P2 Boxscore |
| 12 Jun | 15:00 | Uzbekistan | 1–3 | Australia | 20–25 | 30–28 | 16–25 | 8–25 | | 74–103 | 1,100 | P2 Boxscore |
| 12 Jun | 21:00 | Chinese Taipei | 2–3 | South Korea | 19–25 | 25–19 | 27–25 | 21–25 | 12–15 | 104–109 | 1,800 | P2 Boxscore |

=== Pool B ===
| Pos | Team | Pld | W | L | Pts | SW | SL | SR | SPW | SPL | SPR | Qualification |
|---|---|---|---|---|---|---|---|---|---|---|---|---|
| 1 | Kazakhstan | 5 | 5 | 0 | 14 | 15 | 4 | 3.750 | 439 | 354 | 1.240 | Semifinals |
| 2 | Vietnam | 5 | 4 | 1 | 12 | 14 | 5 | 2.800 | 433 | 343 | 1.262 | Semifinals |
| 3 | Indonesia | 5 | 3 | 2 | 10 | 11 | 7 | 1.571 | 408 | 361 | 1.130 | 5th place match |
| 4 | Iran | 5 | 2 | 3 | 6 | 8 | 9 | 0.889 | 375 | 338 | 1.109 | 7th place match |
| 5 | Hong Kong | 5 | 1 | 4 | 3 | 4 | 12 | 0.333 | 288 | 363 | 0.793 | 9th place match |
| 6 | Lebanon | 5 | 0 | 5 | 0 | 0 | 15 | 0.000 | 191 | 375 | 0.509 | 11th place match |

Source: Volleyball World
Rules for classification: Pool standing procedure

| Date | Time | | Score | | Set 1 | Set 2 | Set 3 | Set 4 | Set 5 | Total | Attd | Report |
|---|---|---|---|---|---|---|---|---|---|---|---|---|
| 6 Jun | 09:00 | Vietnam | 3–0 | Lebanon | 25–3 | 25–15 | 25–14 | | | 75–32 | 284 | P2 Boxscore |
| 6 Jun | 12:00 | Kazakhstan | 3–1 | Hong Kong | 20–25 | 25–17 | 25–16 | 25–13 | | 95–71 | 838 | P2 Boxscore |
| 6 Jun | 18:00 | Iran | 1–3 | Indonesia | 15–25 | 25–21 | 21–25 | 22–25 | | 83–96 | 2,860 | P2 Boxscore |
| 7 Jun | 09:00 | Vietnam | 3–0 | Hong Kong | 25–9 | 25–18 | 25–11 | | | 75–38 | 95 | P2 Boxscore |
| 7 Jun | 18:00 | Kazakhstan | 3–0 | Indonesia | 25–19 | 25–19 | 25–19 | | | 75–57 | 2,919 | P2 Boxscore |
| 8 Jun | 09:00 | Lebanon | 0–3 | Hong Kong | 20–25 | 8–25 | 13–25 | | | 41–75 | 100 | P2 Boxscore |
| 8 Jun | 12:00 | Kazakhstan | 3–1 | Iran | 13–25 | 25–20 | 25–14 | 25–19 | | 88–78 | 529 | P2 Boxscore |
| 8 Jun | 18:00 | Vietnam | 3–2 | Indonesia | 18–25 | 25–22 | 25–18 | 19–25 | 15–13 | 102–103 | 2,173 | P2 Boxscore |
| 9 Jun | 09:00 | Lebanon | 0–3 | Iran | 9–25 | 8–25 | 15–25 | | | 32–75 | 81 | P2 Boxscore |
| 9 Jun | 18:00 | Indonesia | 3–0 | Hong Kong | 25–20 | 27–25 | 25–14 | | | 77–59 | 2,558 | P2 Boxscore |
| 11 Jun | 09:00 | Vietnam | 3–0 | Iran | 25–19 | 25–20 | 27–25 | | | 77–64 | 279 | P2 Boxscore |
| 11 Jun | 12:00 | Lebanon | 0–3 | Kazakhstan | 11–25 | 19–25 | 14–25 | | | 44–75 | 625 | P2 Boxscore |
| 12 Jun | 09:00 | Vietnam | 2–3 | Kazakhstan | 25–18 | 19–25 | 25–23 | 22–25 | 13–15 | 104–106 | 191 | P2 Boxscore |
| 12 Jun | 12:00 | Iran | 3–0 | Hong Kong | 25–14 | 25–13 | 25–18 | | | 75–45 | 892 | P2 Boxscore |
| 12 Jun | 18:00 | Lebanon | 0–3 | Indonesia | 20–25 | 13–25 | 9–25 | | | 42–75 | 1,600 | P2 Boxscore |

== Final round ==
- All times are Philippine Standard Time (UTC+08:00).

=== 11th place match ===
| Date | Time | | Score | | Set 1 | Set 2 | Set 3 | Set 4 | Set 5 | Total | Attd | Report |
|---|---|---|---|---|---|---|---|---|---|---|---|---|
| 13 Jun | 09:30 | Kyrgyzstan | 3–0 | Lebanon | 25–18 | 25–23 | 25–18 | | | 75–59 | 220 | P2 Boxscore |

=== 9th place match ===
| Date | Time | | Score | | Set 1 | Set 2 | Set 3 | Set 4 | Set 5 | Total | Attd | Report |
|---|---|---|---|---|---|---|---|---|---|---|---|---|
| 13 Jun | 12:30 | Uzbekistan | 2–3 | Hong Kong | 25–23 | 16–25 | 25–21 | 26–28 | 9–15 | 101–112 | 789 | P2 Boxscore |

=== 7th place match ===
| Date | Time | | Score | | Set 1 | Set 2 | Set 3 | Set 4 | Set 5 | Total | Attd | Report |
|---|---|---|---|---|---|---|---|---|---|---|---|---|
| 14 Jun | 09:30 | Philippines | 0–3 | Iran | 21–25 | 12–25 | 21–25 | | | 54–75 | 2,077 | P2 Boxscore |

=== 5th place match ===
| Date | Time | | Score | | Set 1 | Set 2 | Set 3 | Set 4 | Set 5 | Total | Attd | Report |
|---|---|---|---|---|---|---|---|---|---|---|---|---|
| 14 Jun | 12:30 | Australia | 0–3 | Indonesia | 13–25 | 19–25 | 24–26 | | | 56–76 | 3,029 | P2 Boxscore |

=== Final four ===
Semifinals
13 June
Kazakhstan | 0
Chinese Taipei | 3
13 June
South Korea | 3
Vietnam | 0

Final
14 June
Chinese Taipei | 0
South Korea | 3
3rd place match
14 June
Kazakhstan | 0
Vietnam | 3

==== Semifinals ====
| Date | Time | | Score | | Set 1 | Set 2 | Set 3 | Set 4 | Set 5 | Total | Attd | Report |
|---|---|---|---|---|---|---|---|---|---|---|---|---|
| 13 Jun | 15:30 | Kazakhstan | 0–3 | Chinese Taipei | 23–25 | 16–25 | 14–25 | | | 53–75 | 2,420 | P2 Boxscore |
| 13 Jun | 19:00 | South Korea | 3–0 | Vietnam | 25–20 | 25–19 | 25–22 | | | 75–61 | 2,500 | P2 Boxscore |

==== 3rd place match ====
| Date | Time | | Score | | Set 1 | Set 2 | Set 3 | Set 4 | Set 5 | Total | Attd | Report |
|---|---|---|---|---|---|---|---|---|---|---|---|---|
| 14 Jun | 15:30 | Kazakhstan | 0–3 | Vietnam | 17–25 | 12–25 | 19–25 | | | 48–75 | 4,597 | P2 Boxscore |

==== Final ====
| Date | Time | | Score | | Set 1 | Set 2 | Set 3 | Set 4 | Set 5 | Total | Attd | Report |
|---|---|---|---|---|---|---|---|---|---|---|---|---|
| 14 Jun | 19:00 | Chinese Taipei | 0–3 | South Korea | 19–25 | 19–25 | 22–25 | | | 60–75 | 6,188 | P2 Boxscore |

== Final standing ==
| Pos | Pool | Team | Pld | W | L | Pts | SW | SL | SR | SPW | SPL | SPR | Qualification |
|---|---|---|---|---|---|---|---|---|---|---|---|---|---|
| 1st place, gold medalist(s) | A | South Korea | 7 | 7 | 0 | 20 | 21 | 2 | 10.500 | 559 | 392 | 1.426 | Qualified for the 2027 AVC Cup |
| 2nd place, silver medalist(s) | A | Chinese Taipei | 7 | 5 | 2 | 16 | 17 | 7 | 2.429 | 556 | 454 | 1.225 | |
| 3rd place, bronze medalist(s) | B | Vietnam | 7 | 5 | 2 | 15 | 17 | 8 | 2.125 | 569 | 466 | 1.221 | |
| 4 | B | Kazakhstan | 7 | 5 | 2 | 14 | 15 | 10 | 1.500 | 540 | 504 | 1.071 | |
| 5 | B | Indonesia | 6 | 4 | 2 | 13 | 14 | 7 | 2.000 | 484 | 417 | 1.161 | |
| 6 | A | Australia | 6 | 3 | 3 | 8 | 10 | 13 | 0.769 | 503 | 496 | 1.014 | |
| 7 | B | Iran | 6 | 3 | 3 | 9 | 11 | 9 | 1.222 | 450 | 392 | 1.148 | |
| 8 | A | Philippines (H) | 6 | 2 | 4 | 7 | 8 | 12 | 0.667 | 398 | 410 | 0.971 | |
| 9 | B | Hong Kong | 6 | 2 | 4 | 5 | 7 | 14 | 0.500 | 400 | 464 | 0.862 | |
| 10 | A | Uzbekistan | 6 | 1 | 5 | 4 | 6 | 15 | 0.400 | 381 | 492 | 0.774 | |
| 11 | A | Kyrgyzstan | 6 | 1 | 5 | 3 | 4 | 15 | 0.267 | 306 | 459 | 0.667 | |
| 12 | B | Lebanon | 6 | 0 | 6 | 0 | 0 | 18 | 0.000 | 250 | 450 | 0.556 | |

Source: Volleyball World
(H) Host

== Awards ==
2026 AVC Women's Volleyball Cup champions

South Korea
First title

The following individual awards were presented at the end of the tournament.

- Most valuable player
  Kang So-hwi (KOR)
- Best setter
  Võ Thị Kim Thoa (VIE)
- Best outside spikers
  Tsai Yu-chun (TPE)
  Kang So-hwi (KOR)
- Best middle blockers
  Park Eun-jin (KOR)
  Chen Ciao-en (TPE)
- Best opposite spiker
  Na Hyun-soo (KOR)
- Best libero
  Lin Chi-jung (TPE)

== See also ==
- 2026 Women's European Volleyball League
- 2026 Copa Sudamericana (women's volleyball)
- 2026 AVC Women's Volleyball Continental Championship
- 2026 AVC Girls' U18 Volleyball Championship
