= Yukiko Wada =

Japanese volleyball player (born 2002)

Personal information
- Full name: Yukiko Wada
- Nickname: Yukko
- Nationality: Japanese
- Born: 8 January 2002 (age 24) Kyoto City, Kyoto, Japan
- Height: 1.74 m (5 ft 9 in)
- Weight: 56 kg (123 lb)
- Spike: 293 cm (115 in)

Volleyball information
- Position: Opposite / Outside Hitter
- Current club: (Japan) NEC Red Rockets Kawasaki
- Number: 13

Career
- Years: Team
- 2017–2020 2020–2024 2024-2026 2026-: (Japan) Kyoto Tachibana High School (Japan) JT Marvelous (Japan) NEC Red Rockets Kawasaki (Italy) UYBA Volley

National team
- Years: Team
- 2023–: Japan
Honours
Women's volleyball
Representing Japan
Asian Games
Silver medal – second place	2026 Aichi/Nagoya	Team
AVC Continental Championship
Bronze medal – third place	2026 Tianjin	Team
Nations League
Silver medal – second place	2024 Bangkok	Team

Yukiko Wada (和田 由紀子, Wada Yukiko; born 8 January 2002) is a Japanese professional volleyball player. She currently plays for UYBA Volley in the Italian Women's Volleyball League.

== Career ==
On February 12, 2020, it was announced that she would join JT Marvelous.

In 2023, she was selected for Japan women's national volleyball team. She was selected as a starting member against the US in the National League qualifying round, who were on a six-game winning streak. She scored 32 points, contributing to a full-set victory that ended opponent's winning streak. In September the same year, she was selected to participate in the Paris Olympic Qualifier Tournament.

In May 2024, she parted ways with JT Marvelous after 4 season. In July the same year, NEC Red Rockets Kawasaki announced that she would be part of the team.

== Awards ==
=== Individual ===
- 2026 AVC Women's Volleyball Continental Championship - Best Opposite

=== National Team ===
- (Thailand) 2024 FIVB Volleyball Women's Nations League - - Runner-up
- (China) 2026 AVC Women's Volleyball Continental Championship - - Bronze Medal
