= Saudi Arabia men's national volleyball team =

National volleyball team

Saudi Arabia
- Association: Saudi Arabia Volleyball Association (SAVBA)
- Confederation: AVC
- Head coach: Veselin Vuković
- FIVB ranking: 75 ▲5 (1 October 2026)

Uniforms
Home	Away

Asian Championship
- Appearances: 10 (First in 1979)
- Best result: 8th (2001)
Honours
Asian Games
Bronze medal – third place	2006 Doha	Team
Asian Challenge Cup
Silver medal – second place	2018 Colombo	Team
Silver medal – second place	2022 Cholpon-Ata	Team
Arab Championship
Silver medal – second place	2006 Manama	Team
Bronze medal – third place	1977 Kuwait	Team
Bronze medal – third place	1980 Syria	Team
Pan Arab Games
Silver medal – second place	1997 Beirut	Team
Bronze medal – third place	1985 Rabat	Team

The Saudi Arabia men's national volleyball team represents Saudi Arabia in international volleyball competitions and matches. The team is currently ranked 59th in the world.

== Competition history ==
=== Asian Championship ===
- (Bahrain) 1979 — 9th place
- (Kuwait) 1987 — 13th place
- (Australia) 1991 — 13th place
- (Qatar) 1997 — 12th place
- (South Korea) 2001 — 8th place
- (China) 2003 — 12th place
- (Indonesia) 2007 — 12th place
- (United Arab Emirates) 2013 — 21st place
- (Indonesia) 2017 — 15th place
- (Japan) 2021 — 12th place

=== Asian Games ===
- (Thailand) 1978 — 8th place
- (India) 1982 — 9th place
- (South Korea) 1986 — 5th place
- (China) 1990 — 6th place
- (Qatar) 2006 — 3rd place
- (China) 2010 — 7th place
- (South Korea) 2014 — 12th place
- (Indonesia) 2018 — 10th place
- (Saudi Arabia) 2034 — Qualified as host

=== Asian Nations Cup ===
- (Sri Lanka) 2018 — (silver) Runners-up
- (Kyrgyzstan) 2022 — (silver) Runners-up
- (Taiwan) 2023 — 14th place

=== Arab Championship ===
- 1977 — (bronze) 3rd place
- 1980 — (bronze) 3rd place
- 2006 — (silver) Runners-up
- 2012 — 4th place
- 2014 — 6th place
- 2016 — 5th place
- 2024 — 7th place

=== Pan Arab Games ===
- 1985 — (bronze) 3rd place
- 1997 — (silver) Runners-up
- 2004 — 4th place
- 2007 — 4th place
- 2011 — 7th place

=== West Asian Championship ===
Champions Runners up Third place Fourth place

West Asian Championship record
Year	Round	Position	GP	MW	ML	SW	SL	Squad
(Bahrain) 2025	Semifinals	4th place	6	3	3	10	12	Squad
Total	0 Titles	1/1	6	3	3	10	12	—

=== CAVA Challenge Cup ===
- (Sri Lanka) 2023 — 4th place
