= Volleyball at the 2023 Arab Games =

- Venue: Hacène Harcha Arena; El Biar Multisports Hall
- Location: Algiers, Algeria
- Dates: 6–14 July

Volleyball at the 2023 Arab Games was held in Algiers, Algeria from 6 to 14 July. In this tournament, 5 teams participated in the men's competition, and same 5 teams in the women's competition.

== Medal table ==
* Host nation (Algeria)

2023 Volleyball Arab Games medal table
Rank	NOC	Gold	Silver	Bronze	Total
1	Algeria (ALG)*	1	1	0	2
2	Libya (LBA)	1	0	0	1
3	Tunisia (TUN)	0	1	0	1
4	Jordan (JOR)	0	0	1	1
4	Qatar (QAT)	0	0	1	1
6	Palestine (PLE)	0	0	0	0
6	United Arab Emirates (UAE)	0	0	0	0
Totals (7 entries)		2	2	2	6

== Medalists ==
Event	Gold	Silver	Bronze
Women	Algeria; Zohra Bensalem; Kahina Chettout; Ghozlane Moulla; Bekhta Rabah-Mazari; Wissem Djouhri; Lydia Amri; Chahla Benmokhtar; Yasmine Abderrahim; Dallal Merwa Achour; Kahina Djouhri; Salima Hammouche; Nawel Hammouche	Tunisia; Tasnim Ben Cheikh; Yasmine Salhi; Sondes Sassi; Ela Essid; Hiba Fatnassi; Dhouha Engazou; Sahar Jenhani; Ahlem Baazaoui; Molka Ben Youssef; Sinda Ben Hmida; Salima Mbarek; Nouha Chekili	Jordan; Nowwar Qawasmi; Rand Haimur; Ragad Haimur; Rahaf Haimur; Farah Al-Atout; Dalia Wadi; Rahaf Abulail; Tala Fahmawi; Nancy Ayyash; Tamara Hazim; Aya Shannak; Maya Al-Taji

== Women's tournament ==
=== Preliminary round ===
Pos	Team	Pld	W	L	Pts	SW	SL	SR	SPW	SPL	SPR
1	Algeria (H)	4	4	0	12	12	0	MAX	300	131	2.290
2	Tunisia U21	4	3	1	9	9	3	3.000	285	168	1.696
3	United Arab Emirates	4	2	2	5	6	8	0.750	251	281	0.893
4	Jordan	4	1	3	4	5	9	0.556	231	290	0.797
5	Qatar	4	0	4	0	0	12	0.000	103	300	0.343

Source: AFVB
(H) Host

Date	Time		Score		Set 1	Set 2	Set 3	Set 4	Set 5	Total
6 Jul	10:00	Jordan	0–3	Tunisia U21	11–25	10–25	14–25			35–75
6 Jul	13:00	Algeria	3–0	United Arab Emirates	25–7	25–12	25–7			75–26
7 Jul	10:00	United Arab Emirates	3–0	Qatar	25–11	25–15	25–12			75–38
7 Jul	13:00	Tunisia U21	0–3	Algeria	18–25	23–25	19–25			60–75
8 Jul	10:00	Qatar	0–3	Tunisia U21	6–25	9–25	3–25			18–75
8 Jul	13:00	Algeria	3–0	Jordan	25–12	25–8	25–8			75–28
9 Jul	10:00	Jordan	3–0	Qatar	25–6	25–7	25–17			75–30
9 Jul	13:00	Tunisia U21	3–0	United Arab Emirates	25–5	25–16	25–19			75–40
10 Jul	10:00	United Arab Emirates	3–2	Jordan	23–25	25–14	22–25	25–23	15–6	110–93
10 Jul	13:00	Qatar	0–3	Algeria	7–25	5–25	5–25			17–75

=== Final round ===
Semifinals
12 July
Algeria	3
Jordan	0
12 July
Tunisia U21	3
United Arab Emirates	0

Gold medal match
14 July
Algeria	3
Tunisia U21	0
Bronze medal match
14 July
Jordan	3
United Arab Emirates	2

==== Semifinals ====
Date	Time		Score		Set 1	Set 2	Set 3	Set 4	Set 5	Total
12 Jul	10:00	Algeria	3–0	Jordan	25–10	25–6	25–13			75–29
12 Jul	13:00	Tunisia U21	3–0	United Arab Emirates	25–17	25–11	25–10			75–38

==== Bronze medal match ====
Date	Time		Score		Set 1	Set 2	Set 3	Set 4	Set 5	Total
14 Jul	10:00	Jordan	3–2	United Arab Emirates	25–23	25–19	22–25	19–25	15–13	106–105

==== Gold medal match ====
Date	Time		Score		Set 1	Set 2	Set 3	Set 4	Set 5	Total
14 Jul	16:00	Algeria	3–0	Tunisia U21	25–23	25–23	25–23			75–69
