= Volleyball at the 1997 Arab Games =

Volleyball competition at the 1997 Pan Arab Games

The volleyball competition at the 1997 Pan Arab Games was held in November in Beirut. Egypt beat Algeria in the final to win the gold medal but Egypt was disqualified because doping of some players. The Saudi Arabia team won the second place and Kuwait third place.

== Men's tournament ==
=== Group A ===
Team	Pld	W	L	F	A	D	Pts
Algeria	3	3	0	9	2	+7	6
Egypt	3	2	1	7	4	+3	5
Bahrain	3	1	2	4	6	-2	4
Qatar	3	0	3	1	9	-8	3

- 1st day

Algeria 3-1 Bahrain
Egypt 3-1 Qatar

- 2nd day

Algeria 3-1 Egypt
Bahrain 3-0 Qatar

- 3rd day

Algeria 3-0 Qatar
Egypt 3-0 Bahrain

=== Group B ===
Team	Pld	W	L	F	A	D	Pts
Saudi Arabia	3	3	0	9	2	+7	6
Kuwait	3	2	1	6	5	+1	5
Lebanon	3	1	2	7	6	+1	4
Libya	3	0	3	0	9	-9	3

- 1st day

Saudi Arabia 3-0 Kuwait
Lebanon 3-0 Libya

- 2nd day

Saudi Arabia 3-0 Libya
Kuwait 3-2 Lebanon

- 3rd day

Kuwait 3-0 Libya
Saudi Arabia 3-2 Lebanon

=== Knock-out stage ===
Semifinals

Algeria - Kuwait
Egypt - Saudi Arabia

The Final

Egypt 3-0 Algeria
(Egypt disqualify because doping of players)

7th-8th Places

Qatar 3-0 Libya

5th-6th Places

Bahrain 3-2 Lebanon

The 3rd/4th Place

Saudi Arabia 3-1 Kuwait

== Women's tournament ==
Team	Pld	W	L	F	A	D	Pts
Egypt	3	3	0	9	1	+8	6
Algeria	3	2	1	7	3	+4	5
Morocco	3	1	2	3	6	-3	4
Lebanon	3	0	3	0	9	-9	3

- 1st day

Algeria 3-0 Lebanon
Egypt 3-0 Morocco

- 2nd day

Morocco 3-0 Lebanon
Egypt 3-1 Algeria

- 3rd day

Egypt 3-0 Lebanon
Algeria 3-0 Morocco
