= Lebanon women's national volleyball team =

Lebanon
- Association: Lebanese Volleyball Federation
- Confederation: AVC
- Head coach: Elie Nar
- FIVB ranking: NR (2 October 2026)

Uniforms
Home	Away

The Lebanon women's national volleyball team (Arabic: منتخب لبنان في الكرة الطائرة للسيدات), nicknamed "the Cedars", represents Lebanon in international women's volleyball competitions and friendlies. It is governed by the Lebanese Volleyball Federation (FLVB).

== History ==
In November 2022, the team competed in the inaugural West Asian Championship held in Jordan, winning all seven of their matches to claim the first title.

== Team ==
=== Current squad ===
Roster for the 2025 WAVA Women's Volleyball Championship.

- Head coach: (Lebanon) Elie Nar
- Asst. coach: (Lebanon) Lara Jarah

No.	Pos.	Player	Birth date and age	Height (cm)	Block (cm)	Spike (cm)
2	L	Lina Jrad				
5	L	Hanane Lababidi	6 February 2003 (age 23)	160		
6	OH	Mira Adra	2 March 1986 (age 40)	167		
7	O	Mariella Jreidi		167		
9	MB	Lynn Zaouk	16 August 2005 (age 21)	175		
10	OH	Lara Al Nahi				
11	OH	Mirna Cheikho		168		
12	OH	Aya Maria Matar	20 January 2002 (age 24)	171		
13	S	Nour Abi Chahine				
14	MB	Lucciana Bassil				
15	O	Shantalle Demirjian				
17	MB	Lea Chebib		180		
19	S	Karen Moukarzel		163		
23	MB	Yasmine Damerji		185		

== Competitive record ==
=== Asian Championship ===
Asian Championship record
Year	Round	Position	Pld	W	L	SW	SL	Squad
(Australia) 1975 to (Thailand) 2023	Did not enter							
(China) 2026	Qualified but withdrew							
Total		0/22	–	–	–	–	–	

=== Asian Nations Cup ===
Asian Nations Cup record
Year	Round	Position	Pld	W	L	SW	SL	Squad
(Thailand) 2022 to (Vietnam) 2025	Did not enter							
(Philippines) 2026	Classification Round	12th	6	0	6	0	18	Squad
Total		1/5	6	0	6	0	18	

=== WAVA Championship ===
WAVA Championship record
Year	Round	Position	Pld	W	L	SW	SL	Squad
(Jordan) 2022	Final	1st place, gold medalist(s)	7	7	0	21	2	Squad
(Jordan) 2025	Round-robin	1st place, gold medalist(s)	5	5	0	15	3	Squad
(Jordan) 2026	Round-robin	1st place, gold medalist(s)	3	3	0	9	2	Squad
Total	2 Titles	3/3	15	15	0	45	7	

=== Mediterranean Games ===
- (Syria) 1987: 6th (last)

=== Arab Games ===
- (Lebanon) 1997: 4th (last)

== See also ==
- Lebanon men's national volleyball team
