= Iraq women's national volleyball team =

Iraq
- Association: Iraqi Volleyball Federation
- Confederation: AVC
- Head coach: Randy Matti
- FIVB ranking: NR (24 May 2026)

Uniforms
Home	Away

AVC Continental Championship
- Appearances: 1 (First in 2026)
- Best result: 12th (2026)

The Iraq women's national volleyball team (Arabic: منتخب العراق الوطني للكرة الطائرة للسيدات) represents Iraq in international women's volleyball competitions and friendlies and is controlled by the Iraqi Volleyball Federation (IVF).

== History ==
In late 2022, following strong performances by women's club players in the Iraqi Women's Premier Volleyball League and the Regional League, the Iraqi Volleyball Federation reestablished the national women's national team after more than twenty years of inactivity, ahead of the inaugural West Asian Championship held in Amman, Jordan, in November 2022. The team finished second in Pool A, with their only loss coming against the eventual champions, Lebanon. They went on to defeat Kuwait in the quarter-finals, before losing to Jordan in the semi-finals and to the UAE in the third-place playoff, ultimately finishing fourth.

In October 2025, the team returned for the second edition of the tournament, which served as a qualifier for the continental championship for the first time.

== Team ==
=== Current squad ===
Roster for the 2025 WAVA Women's Volleyball Championship.

No.	Pos.	Player	Club
1		Doreen Romel	(Iraq) (Kurdistan Region) Sanhareb
2		Amanda Adwer	(Iraq) (Assyrian homeland) Akkad Ankawa
4		Priva Rzgar	(Iraq) (Kurdistan Region) Sanhareb
5		Helen Omar	(Iraq) (Assyrian homeland) Akkad Ankawa
7		Bahra Hamd	(Iraq) (Kurdistan Region) Sanhareb
8		Violet Youkhana	
9		Vanessa Ishaq	
11		Norma Muneer	(Iraq) (Assyrian homeland) Akkad Ankawa
10		Dashne Qasim	(Iraq) (Kurdistan Region) Sanhareb
12		Diya Wali	(Iraq) (Kurdistan Region) Sanhareb
13		Hamisha Hoshyar	(Iraq) (Assyrian homeland) Akkad Ankawa
15		Daniella Najim	
17		Kazhin Jalal	(Iraq) (Assyrian homeland) Akkad Ankawa
18		Moreen Sabry	

== Competitive record ==
The Iraqi team is yet to qualify for any major tournaments.

=== AVC Continental Championship ===
AVC Continental Championship record
Year	Final result	Pld	W	L	SW	SL
(China) 2026	12th place	3	0	3	0	9
Total	1/22	3	0	3	0	9

=== West Asian Championship ===
WAVA Women's Volleyball Championship record
Year	Final result	Pld	W	L	SW	SL
(Jordan) 2022	Fourth place	7	4	3	18	11
(Jordan) 2025	Third place	5	3	2	10	6
(Jordan) 2026	Third place	3	1	2	5	6
Total	3/3	15	8	7	33	23

=== Arab Games ===
- (Morocco) 1985: (bronze)

== See also ==
- Iraq men's national volleyball team
