= Volleyball at the 2007 Arab Games =

Volleyball at the 2007 Pan Arab Games

The volleyball competition at the 2007 Pan Arab Games was held in November. Qatar beat Bahrain in the final to win the gold medal and the Egyptian team won the third place play-off for the bronze medal.

== Competition ==
=== Group A ===
Team	Pld	W	L	F	A	D	Pts
Egypt	4	4	0	12	2	+10	8
Bahrain	4	3	1	11	5	+6	7
Tunisia	4	2	2	6	6	0	6
Kuwait	4	1	3	5	10	-5	5
Iraq	4	0	4	1	12	-11	4

- November 8, 2007

Kuwait 0-3 Egypt
Bahrain 3-0 Tunisia

- November 9, 2007

Kuwait 3-1 Iraq
Egypt 3-0 Tunisia

- November 10, 2007

Bahrain 3-0 Iraq
Kuwait 0-3 Tunisia

- November 11, 2007

Tunisia 3-0 Iraq
Bahrain 2-3 Egypt

- November 12, 2007

Iraq 0-3 Egypt
Bahrain 3-2 Kuwait

=== Group B ===
Team	Pld	W	L	F	A	D	Pts
Saudi Arabia	3	3	0	9	1	+8	6
Qatar	3	2	1	7	4	+3	5
Jordan	3	1	2	4	6	-2	4
Libya	3	0	3	0	9	-9	3

- November 8, 2007

Qatar 3-1 Jordan
Libya 0-3 Saudi Arabia

- November 10, 2007

Libya 0-3 Jordan
Saudi Arabia 3-1 Qatar

- November 12, 2007

Qatar 3-0 Libya
Jordan 0-3 Saudi Arabia

=== Knock-out stage ===
Semifinals

- November 13, 2007

Bahrain 3-1 Saudi Arabia
Qatar 3-2 Egypt

The Final

- November 14, 2007

Qatar 3-1 Bahrain

5th-8th Places

- November 13, 2007

Tunisia 3-0 Jordan
Libya 3-2 Kuwait

The 3rd/4th Place

- November 14, 2007

Egypt 3-1 Saudi Arabia
