= 2026 AVC Women's Volleyball Continental Championship =

2026 Asian Women's Volleyball Continental Championship
2026年亚洲女子排球锦标赛 (Chinese); 2026 Nián Yàzhōu Nǚzǐ Páiqiú Jǐnbiāosài

Tournament details
- Host country: China
- City: Tianjin
- Dates: 21 August – 30 August
- Teams: 12 (from 1 confederation)
- Venue: 1 (in 1 host city)

Final positions
- Champions: Thailand (4th title)
- Runners-up: China
- Third place: Japan
- Fourth place: Iran

Tournament awards
- MVP: (Thailand) Pornpun Guedpard
- Best Setter: (Thailand) Pornpun Guedpard
- Best OH: (Thailand) Sasipaporn Janthawisut; (China) Zhuang Yushan
- Best MB: (China) Wang Yuanyuan; (Thailand) Thatdao Nuekjang
- Best OPP: (Japan) Yukiko Wada
- Best Libero: (China) Wang Mengjie

Tournament statistics
- Matches played: 26
- Attendance: 29,433 (1,132 per match)

The 2026 AVC Women's Volleyball Continental Championship was the 23rd staging of the AVC Women's Volleyball Continental Championship, a biennial international volleyball tournament by the Asian Volleyball Confederation (AVC) with China Volleyball Association (CVA). The tournament took place at Tianjin Olympic Center Gymnasium in Tianjin, China from 21 August to 30 August 2026.

Following structural adjustments to the international volleyball calendar by the Fédération Internationale de Volleyball (FIVB), Continental Championships are now permanently staged during even-numbered years to maximize player welfare and clean up qualification pathways. The 2026 edition would serve as a direct qualification pathway for major international tournaments. The winning team would earn a direct quota place for the 2028 Summer Olympics, while the top three finishers secured qualification spots for the 2027 FIVB Women's Volleyball World Cup.

Thailand defeated host nation China 3–2 in the final to retain the continental title. The victory earned Thailand direct qualification for the 2028 Summer Olympic, marking the country's first-ever Olympic appearance in women's volleyball. Japan swept Iran 3–0 in the third place match. Iran's semi-finals appearance marked a historic first for the nation. As the top three finishers of the tournament, Thailand, China, and Japan qualified for the 2027 FIVB World Cup. Pornpun Guedpard of Thailand named the MVP of the tournament.

== Year change ==
On 22 June 2023, the Fédération Internationale de Volleyball (FIVB) announced a comprehensive restructuring of the international calendar for the 2025–2028 cycle. As part of this overhaul, continental championships shifted from odd-numbered years to even-numbered years, beginning in 2026. The structural change was implemented to prioritize athlete health and recovery by reducing calendar congestion, as well as to streamline the qualification pathways for major global tournaments such as the FIVB World Cup and the Olympic Games.

== Host selection ==
On 4 July 2026, the China Volleyball Association (CVA) opened a public bidding process seeking host cities within China that could meet the tournament's criteria, which included having a competition court with at least 5,000 seats. Following a comprehensive evaluation of proposals submitted by 18 July 2025, the CVA finalized its bidding procedures with the continental governing body.

On 20 December 2025, the Asian Volleyball Confederation officially unveiled its comprehensive calendar for the 2026 international season following joint meetings with the FIVB and Volleyball World in Bangkok, Thailand. During this announcement, Tianjin, China, was confirmed as the host city for the Women's Continental Championship.

== Teams ==
=== Qualification ===
The tournament featured a maximum of 12 teams, qualified through the following criteria:

- Host country (1)
- Defending champion of the 2023 edition (1)
- AVC Nations Cup champion (1)
- FIVB World Ranking (4)
- Zonal champions/qualification (5)

The final list of participating teams was officially confirmed by the AVC on 6 February 2026.

Team	Method of qualification	Date of qualification	Appearance(s)				Previous best performance (Note: Bold text indicates they hosted that edition.)
Team	Method of qualification	Date of qualification	Total	First	Last	Streak	Previous best performance
China	Hosts	20 December 2025	22nd	1975	2023	22	**Champions** (13 times) (Note: China won in 1979, 1987, 1989, 1991, 1993, 1995, 1997, 1999, 2001, 2003, 2005, 2011, and 2015.)
Thailand	Defending champions	6 September 2023	19th	1987	2023	19	**Champions** (2009, **2013**, **2023**)
Vietnam	2025 AVC Nations Cup champions	14 June 2025	12th	1991	2023	2	4th place (2023)
Hong Kong (Note: As China, Chinese Taipei, and South Korea had qualified, its slot was reallocated to Hong Kong.)	2025 Asian Eastern Zonal Championship 4th placers	31 August 2025	17th	1979	2023	6	6th place (**1979**)
Iran	2025 CAVA champions	5 October 2025	9th	2007	2023	9	8th place (2009, 2011, 2013, 2015)
Iraq (Note: Originally, Lebanon had qualified as 2025 WAVA Championship champions, but later it withdrew and was replaced by Iraq.)	2025 WAVA 3rd placers	9 October 2025	1st	Debut		1	—N/a
Indonesia (Note: As Thailand and Vietnam had qualified, its slot was reallocated to Indonesia.)	2025 SEA Games 3rd placers	15 December 2025	12th	1979	2019	1	5th place (1979)
Australia	2025 Oceania Qualifier champions	22 December 2025	22nd	1975	2023	22	4th place (**1975**, 1979)
Japan	1st World ranked AVC team	1 January 2026	22nd	1975	2023	22	**Champions** (1975, **1983**, 2007, 2017, 2019)
Kazakhstan	2nd World ranked AVC team	1 January 2026	13th	1993	2023	11	Runners-up (2005)
Chinese Taipei	3rd World ranked AVC team	1 January 2026	19th	1983	2023	18	4th place (6 times) (Note: Chinese Taipei was placed fourth in 1983, 1989, 1993, 1995, 1997, and 2015.)
South Korea	4th World ranked AVC team	1 January 2026	22nd	1975	2023	22	Runners-up (7 times) (Note: South Korea was a runner-up in 1975, 1989, 1995, 1997, 1999, 2001, and 2015.)

=== Seeding ===
Teams were split into three pools with four teams each. The hosts were automatically placed in the top position of Pool A as the first seed, while the previous champions were placed at the top of Pool B as the second seed. The next four teams from the FIVB World Ranking as of 1 January 2026 were placed across the first and second lines using the serpentine system. The third and fourth lines consisted of the remaining teams according to the ranking and were drawn in the ceremony.

Seeded teams	Line 3	Line 4
Japan (6); China (hosts) (7); Thailand (defending champions) (13); Vietnam (28); Kazakhstan (35); Chinese Taipei (37)	South Korea (40); Iran (47); Indonesia (70)	Australia (73); Hong Kong (81); Iraq (–)

=== Draw results ===
The drawing of lots was held at the Crowne Plaza in Tianjin on 28 July 2026.

External videos
- [LIVE] Drawing of Lots - AVC Women's Volleyball Continental Tianjin 2026

Pool A
Pos	Team
A1	China
A2	Chinese Taipei
A3	Iran
A4	Iraq

Pool B
Pos	Team
B1	Thailand
B2	Kazakhstan
B3	Indonesia
B4	Australia

Pool C
Pos	Team
C1	Japan
C2	Vietnam
C3	South Korea
C4	Hong Kong

=== Squads ===
Each of the 12 national teams participating in the tournament was required to submit a provisional release list of 25 players by 22 July 2026, before finalizing a tournament squad of 12 to 14 players by 15 August 2026.

== Venue ==
On 23 July 2026, the China Volleyball Association (CVA) announced that the tournament would be held in Tianjin, China. All matches took place at Tianjin Olympic Center Gymnasium.

Tianjin, China	Location map of the host venue
Tianjin Olympic Center Gymnasium	Location map of the host venue
Capacity: 10,000	Location map of the host venue

== Team ranking system ==
=== Pool standing procedure ===
To establish the ranking of teams after the preliminary round, the following criteria were implemented:

1. Total number of victories (matches won, matches lost)
2. In the event of a tie, the following first tiebreaker will apply: The teams will be ranked by the most point gained per match as follows:
  - Match won 3–0 or 3–1: 3 points for the winner, 0 points for the loser
  - Match won 3–2: 2 points for the winner, 1 point for the loser
  - Match forfeited: 3 points for the winner, 0 points (0–25, 0–25, 0–25) for the loser
3. If teams are still tied after examining the number of victories and points gained, then the AVC will examine the results in order to break the tie in the following order:
  - Set quotient: if two or more teams are tied on the number of points gained, they will be ranked by the quotient resulting from the division of the number of all set won by the number of all sets lost.
  - Points quotient: if the tie persists based on the set quotient, the teams will be ranked by the quotient resulting from the division of all points scored by the total of points lost during all sets.
  - If the tie persists based on the point quotient, the tie will be broken based on the team that won the match of the Round Robin Phase between the tied teams. When the tie in point quotient is between three or more teams, these teams ranked taking into consideration only the matches involving the teams in question.

=== Teams combined ranking system ===
To determine the teams playing in the quarterfinals and their match-ups, the following criteria were implemented:

1. Position of the team in the Pool (1st, 2nd, 3rd and 4th)
2. Total number of victories (matches won, matches lost)
3. In the event of a tie, the following first tiebreaker will apply: The teams will be ranked by the most point gained per match as follows:
  - Match won 3–0 or 3–1: 3 points for the winner, 0 points for the loser
  - Match won 3–2: 2 points for the winner, 1 point for the loser
  - Match forfeited: 3 points for the winner, 0 points (0–25, 0–25, 0–25) for the loser
4. If teams are still tied after examining the number of victories and points gained, then the AVC will examine the results in order to break the tie in the following order:
  - Set quotient: if two or more teams are tied on the number of points gained, they will be ranked by the quotient resulting from the division of the number of all set won by the number of all sets lost.
  - Points quotient: if the tie persists based on the set quotient, the teams will be ranked by the quotient resulting from the division of all points scored by the total of points lost during all sets.
  - If the tie persists based on the point quotient, the tie will be broken based on the team that won the match of the Round Robin Phase between the tied teams. When the tie in point quotient is between three or more teams, these teams ranked taking into consideration only the matches involving the teams in question.

=== Final standing procedure ===
To establish the final rankings of teams of the tournament, the following criteria were implemented:

1. After the preliminary round, eliminated teams will be ranked as per the teams combined ranking system from 9th to 12th place.
2. After the quarterfinals, eliminated teams will be ranked as per the teams combined ranking system from 8th to 5th place, including all matches played so far in the preliminary round and the final round.
3. During the final round, the teams that do not win the semi-finals will compete for 4th and 3rd place and the winners of the semi-finals will compete for 2nd and 1st place.

== Preliminary round ==
- All times are China Standard Time (UTC+08:00).

=== Pool A ===
Pos	Team	Pld	W	L	Pts	SW	SL	SR	SPW	SPL	SPR	Qualification
1	China (H)	3	3	0	9	9	0	MAX	225	107	2.103	Advance to quarter-finals
2	Iran	3	2	1	6	6	4	1.500	219	174	1.259	Advance to quarter-finals
3	Chinese Taipei	3	1	2	3	4	6	0.667	198	192	1.031	Advance to quarter-finals
4	Iraq	3	0	3	0	0	9	0.000	56	225	0.249	

Source: AVC
Rules for classification: Pool standing procedure
(H) Host

Date	Time		Score		Set 1	Set 2	Set 3	Set 4	Set 5	Total	Attd	Report
21 Aug	10:00	Chinese Taipei	1–3	Iran	25–16	25–27	19–25	14–25		83–93	50	P2 Boxscore
22 Aug	19:30	China	3–0	Iraq	25–4	25–6	25–6			75–16	2,973	P2 Boxscore
23 Aug	14:00	Chinese Taipei	3–0	Iraq	25–5	25–8	25–11			75–24	147	P2 Boxscore
24 Aug	19:30	China	3–0	Iran	25–14	25–23	25–14			75–51	1,940	P2 Boxscore
25 Aug	14:00	Iran	3–0	Iraq	25–4	25–7	25–5			75–16	35	P2 Boxscore
26 Aug	19:30	China	3–0	Chinese Taipei	25–17	25–16	25–7			75–40	1,818	P2 Boxscore

=== Pool B ===
Pos	Team	Pld	W	L	Pts	SW	SL	SR	SPW	SPL	SPR	Qualification
1	Thailand	3	3	0	9	9	1	9.000	248	171	1.450	Advance to quarter-finals
2	Indonesia	3	2	1	6	6	3	2.000	199	198	1.005	Advance to quarter-finals
3	Kazakhstan	3	1	2	3	4	6	0.667	216	233	0.927	
4	Australia	3	0	3	0	0	9	0.000	164	225	0.729	

Source: AVC
Rules for classification: Pool standing procedure

Date	Time		Score		Set 1	Set 2	Set 3	Set 4	Set 5	Total	Attd	Report
21 Aug	14:00	Thailand	3–0	Australia	25–15	25–15	25–18			75–48	193	P2 Boxscore
22 Aug	15:00	Kazakhstan	0–3	Indonesia	22–25	22–25	23–25			67–75	78	P2 Boxscore
23 Aug	10:00	Kazakhstan	3–0	Australia	25–21	25–18	25–21			75–60	121	P2 Boxscore
24 Aug	15:00	Thailand	3–0	Indonesia	25–16	25–18	25–15			75–49	68	P2 Boxscore
25 Aug	10:00	Thailand	3–1	Kazakhstan	25–22	25–16	23–25	25–11		98–74	53	P2 Boxscore
26 Aug	15:00	Indonesia	3–0	Australia	25–18	25–17	25–21			75–56	65	P2 Boxscore

=== Pool C ===
Pos	Team	Pld	W	L	Pts	SW	SL	SR	SPW	SPL	SPR	Qualification
1	Japan	3	3	0	9	9	0	MAX	233	167	1.395	Advance to quarter-finals
2	South Korea	3	2	1	6	6	5	1.200	262	235	1.115	Advance to quarter-finals
3	Vietnam	3	1	2	3	4	6	0.667	219	214	1.023	Advance to quarter-finals
4	Hong Kong	3	0	3	0	1	9	0.111	147	245	0.600	

Source: AVC
Rules for classification: Pool standing procedure

Date	Time		Score		Set 1	Set 2	Set 3	Set 4	Set 5	Total	Attd	Report
21 Aug	18:30	Japan	3–0	Hong Kong	25–9	25–15	25–12			75–36	501	P2 Boxscore
22 Aug	10:00	Vietnam	1–3	South Korea	20–25	25–22	21–25	17–25		83–97	125	P2 Boxscore
23 Aug	18:30	Japan	3–0	South Korea	33–31	25–19	25–20			83–70	1,332	P2 Boxscore
24 Aug	10:00	Vietnam	3–0	Hong Kong	25–19	25–12	25–11			75–42	43	P2 Boxscore
25 Aug	18:30	Japan	3–0	Vietnam	25–23	25–17	25–21			75–61	355	P2 Boxscore
26 Aug	10:00	South Korea	3–1	Hong Kong	20–25	25–15	25–11	25–18		95–69	98	P2 Boxscore

=== Combined ranking ===
Pos	Pool	Team	Pld	W	L	Pts	SW	SL	SR	SPW	SPL	SPR	Qualification
1	A	China (H)	3	3	0	9	9	0	MAX	225	107	2.103	Advance to quarter-finals
2	C	Japan	3	3	0	9	9	0	MAX	233	167	1.395	Advance to quarter-finals
3	B	Thailand	3	3	0	9	9	1	9.000	248	171	1.450	Advance to quarter-finals
4	B	Indonesia	3	2	1	6	6	3	2.000	199	198	1.005	Advance to quarter-finals
5	A	Iran	3	2	1	6	6	4	1.500	219	174	1.259	Advance to quarter-finals
6	C	South Korea	3	2	1	6	6	5	1.200	262	235	1.115	Advance to quarter-finals
7	A	Chinese Taipei	3	1	2	3	4	6	0.667	198	192	1.031	Advance to quarter-finals
8	C	Vietnam	3	1	2	3	4	6	0.667	219	214	1.023	Advance to quarter-finals
9	B	Kazakhstan	3	1	2	3	4	6	0.667	216	233	0.927	
10	C	Hong Kong	3	0	3	0	1	9	0.111	147	245	0.600	
11	B	Australia	3	0	3	0	0	9	0.000	164	225	0.729	
12	A	Iraq	3	0	3	0	0	9	0.000	56	225	0.249	

Source: AVC
Rules for classification: Teams combined ranking system
(H) Host

== Final round ==
- All times are China Standard Time (UTC+08:00).

Quarter-finals
28 August
China	3
Vietnam	0
28 August
Indonesia	1
Iran	3
27 August
Japan	3
Chinese Taipei	0
27 August
Thailand	3
South Korea	0

Semi-finals
29 August
China	3
Iran	0
29 August
Japan	1
Thailand	3

Final
30 August
China	2
Thailand	3
Third place match
30 August
Iran	0
Japan	3

=== Quarter-finals ===
Date	Time		Score		Set 1	Set 2	Set 3	Set 4	Set 5	Total	Attd	Report
27 Aug	14:00	Thailand	3–0	South Korea	25–20	25–18	25–21			75–59	116	P2 Boxscore
27 Aug	18:30	Japan	3–0	Chinese Taipei	25–14	25–21	25–13			75–48	177	P2 Boxscore
28 Aug	15:00	Indonesia	1–3	Iran	25–19	16–25	12–25	17–25		70–94	92	P2 Boxscore
28 Aug	19:30	China	3–0	Vietnam	25–15	25–22	25–13			75–50	2,953	P2 Boxscore

=== Semi-finals ===
Date	Time		Score		Set 1	Set 2	Set 3	Set 4	Set 5	Total	Attd	Report
29 Aug	17:15	Japan	1–3	Thailand	21–25	20–25	25–20	20–25		86–95	1,854	P2 Boxscore
29 Aug	20:00	China	3–0	Iran	25–22	25–12	25–19			75–53	3,194	P2 Boxscore

=== Third place match ===
Date	Time		Score		Set 1	Set 2	Set 3	Set 4	Set 5	Total	Attd	Report
30 Aug	15:15	Iran	0–3	Japan	21–25	16–25	24–26			61–76	434	P2 Boxscore

=== Final ===
Date	Time		Score		Set 1	Set 2	Set 3	Set 4	Set 5	Total	Attd	Report
30 Aug	18:45	China	2–3	Thailand	20–25	25–11	25–23	18–25	10–15	98–99	9,390	P2 Boxscore

== Final standing ==
Pos	Team	Pld	W	L	Pts	SW	SL	SR	SPW	SPL	SPR	Qualification
1st place, gold medalist(s)	Thailand	6	6	0	17	18	4	4.500	517	414	1.249	Qualified for the 2027 World Cup, 2028 Summer Olympics, and 2028 Continental Championship
2nd place, silver medalist(s)	China (H)	6	5	1	16	17	3	5.667	473	309	1.531	Qualified for the 2027 World Cup
3rd place, bronze medalist(s)	Japan	6	5	1	15	16	3	5.333	469	371	1.264	Qualified for the 2027 World Cup
4	Iran	6	3	3	9	9	11	0.818	427	374	1.142	
5	Indonesia	4	2	2	6	7	6	1.167	269	292	0.921	
6	South Korea	4	2	2	6	6	8	0.750	321	310	1.035	
7	Vietnam	4	1	3	3	4	9	0.444	269	289	0.931	
8	Chinese Taipei	4	1	3	3	4	9	0.444	246	267	0.921	
9	Kazakhstan	3	1	2	3	4	6	0.667	216	233	0.927	
10	Hong Kong	3	0	3	0	1	9	0.111	147	245	0.600	
11	Australia	3	0	3	0	0	9	0.000	164	225	0.729	
12	Iraq	3	0	3	0	0	9	0.000	56	225	0.249	

Source: Volleyball World
(H) Host

== Awards ==
2026 AVC Women's Volleyball Continental champions

Thailand
Fourth title

The following awards were given at the conclusion of the tournament:

- Most valuable player
  (Thailand) Pornpun Guedpard
- Best setter
  (Thailand) Pornpun Guedpard
- Best outside spikers
  (Thailand) Sasipaporn Janthawisut
  (China) Zhuang Yushan
- Best middle blockers
  (China) Wang Yuanyuan
  (Thailand) Thatdao Nuekjang
- Best opposite spiker
  (Japan) Yukiko Wada
- Best libero
  (China) Wang Mengjie

== Statistics ==
The statistics of leaders for each skill were recorded throughout the tournament:

Best Scorers
Rank	Player	Attacks	Blocks	Serves	Total
1	(Thailand) Sasipaporn Janthawisut	104	4	7	115
2	(China) Zhuang Yushan	80	15	5	100
3	(Iran) Elahe Poorsaleh	81	9	4	94
4	(Thailand) Pimpichaya Kokram	86	4	3	93
5	(Japan) Yukiko Wada	71	7	9	87

Best Attackers
Rank	Player	Points	Errors	Attempts	Total	%
1	(Thailand) Sasipaporn Janthawisut	104	25	113	242	42.98
2	(Thailand) Pimpichaya Kokram	86	22	85	193	44.56
3	(Iran) Elahe Poorsaleh	81	20	74	175	46.29
4	(China) Zhuang Yushan	80	7	80	167	47.90
5	(Japan) Yukiko Wada	71	11	67	149	47.65

Best Blockers
Rank	Player	Blocks	Errors	Rebounds	Total	Avg
1	(China) Zhuang Yushan	15	10	20	45	2.50
1	(China) Wang Yuanyuan	15	17	32	64	2.50
3	(Thailand) Thatdao Nuekjang	14	16	43	73	2.33
4	(Iran) Fatemeh Khalili	11	11	8	30	1.83
5	(Japan) Maki Yamaguchi	10	13	25	48	1.67
5	(South Korea) Lee Da-hyeon	10	17	27	54	2.50

Best Servers
Rank	Player	Points	Errors	Attempts	Total	Avg
1	(Thailand) Chatchu-on Moksri	12	11	58	81	2.00
2	(Japan) Yukiko Wada	9	4	56	69	1.50
3	(Thailand) Sasipaporn Janthawisut	7	7	77	91	1.17
4	(Indonesia) Namira Maradanti	6	2	39	47	1.50
5	(Iran) Ayda Valinezhad	5	3	55	63	0.83
5	(Japan) Mayu Ishikawa	5	8	57	70	0.83
5	(China) Zhuang Yushan	5	3	63	71	0.83
5	(China) Gong Xiangyu	5	2	67	74	0.83

Best Setters
Rank	Player	Successful	Errors	Attempts	Total	Avg
1	(Thailand) Pornpun Guedpard	219	3	318	540	36.50
2	(Japan) Nanami Seki	138	3	335	476	23.00
3	(Indonesia) Arneta Putri Amelian	124	5	275	404	31.00
4	(Iran) Shabnam Alikhani	123	0	349	472	20.50
5	(South Korea) Kim Da-in	121	3	239	363	30.25

Best Diggers
Rank	Player	Digs	Errors	Receptions	Total	Avg
1	(China) Wang Mengjie	80	11	12	103	13.33
2	(Japan) Satomi Fukudome	63	16	18	97	10.50
3	(Thailand) Chatchu-on Moksri	61	15	10	86	10.17
4	(Thailand) Sasipaporn Janthawisut	59	14	24	97	9.83
4	(South Korea) Han Da-hye	59	24	20	103	14.75

Best Receivers
Rank	Player	Successful	Errors	Attempts	Total	%
1	(Thailand) Sasipaporn Janthawisut	57	3	104	164	34.76
1	(Japan) Mayu Ishikawa	57	3	60	120	47.50
3	(Thailand) Chatchu-on Moksri	39	3	67	109	35.78
4	(Iran) Ayda Valinezhad	35	3	64	102	34.31
5	(Iran) Fatemeh Khalili	30	6	64	100	30.00

== See also ==
- 2026 Women's African Nations Volleyball Championship
- 2026 Women's European Volleyball Championship
- 2026 Women's NORCECA Volleyball Championship
- 2026 Women's South American Volleyball Championship
- 2026 AVC Women's Volleyball Cup
- 2026 AVC Girls' U18 Volleyball Championship
