= Jordan Volleyball Federation =

Lebanon athletic organization

- Sport: Volleyball; Beach volleyball
- Jurisdiction: Jordan
- Abbreviation: JVF
- Founded: 1961
- Affiliation: FIVB
- Affiliation date: 1971
- Headquarters: Amman
- Location: Jordan

Official website
- jvf.jo
- (Jordan)

The Jordan Volleyball Federation (JVF) (Arabic: الاتحاد الاردني للكرة الطائرة), is the governing body for volleyball in Jordan since 1961.

== History ==
Volleyball was first introduced to Jordan in 1938, where it was played around school playgrounds.

It then joined the Asian Volleyball Confederation and the FIVB in 1971, as well as the Arab Volleyball Association later on in 1975.

The federation organizes all domestic volleyball competitions for men and women, as well as beach volleyball activities in the country for both genders.
