= Volleyball at the 2011 Arab Games =

Volleyball at the 2011 Pan Arab Games was held in Doha, Qatar from December 10 to 21, 2011. In this tournament, 11 teams participated in the men's competition, and 5 teams participated in the women's competition.

== Medalists ==
Event	Gold	Silver	Bronze
Men's indoor	Egypt	Qatar	Algeria
Women's indoor	Egypt	Algeria	United Arab Emirates
Men's beach	Oman; Al Subhi; Al Balushi	Oman; Al Housni; Al Shereiqi	Bahrain; Marhoon; Qarqoor

== Medal table ==
Rank	Nation	Gold	Silver	Bronze	Total
1	Egypt	2	0	0	2
2	Oman	1	1	0	2
3	Algeria	0	1	1	2
4	Qatar	0	1	0	1
5	Bahrain	0	0	1	1
5	United Arab Emirates	0	0	1	1
Total		3	3	3	9
