= Iraqi Volleyball Federation =

Iraq athletic organization

Iraq Volleyball Federation
- Sport: Volleyball; Beach volleyball
- Jurisdiction: Iraq
- Abbreviation: IVF
- Founded: 1959
- Affiliation: FIVB
- Affiliation date: 1959
- Headquarters: Baghdad
- Location: Iraq
- President: Mr. Jameel AZEEZ

Official website
- www.fivb.org/EN/FIVB/Federation.asp?NF=IRQ
- (Iraq)

The Iraq Volleyball Federation (IVF) (Arabic: الأتحاد العراقي للكرة الطائرة), is the governing body for Volleyball in Iraq since 1959.

== History ==
The Iraq Volleyball Federation has been recognised by FIVB from 1959 and is a member of the Asian Volleyball Confederation and the Arab Volleyball Federation. The Federation organizes all domestic volleyball competitions for men and women as well it rules over Beach Volleyball activities in the country for both genders.
