= Lebanese Volleyball Federation =

Lebanon athletic organization

- Sport: Volleyball; Beach volleyball
- Jurisdiction: Lebanon
- Abbreviation: LVF
- Founded: 1949
- Affiliation: FIVB
- Affiliation date: 1949
- Headquarters: Beirut
- Location: Lebanon

Official website
- www.volleylebanon.com
- (Lebanon)

The Lebanese Volleyball Federation (LVF; Arabic: الأتحاد اللبناني للكرة الطائرة) is the governing body for volleyball in Lebanon since 1949.

The LVF has been recognised by FIVB from 1949 and is a member of the Asian Volleyball Confederation and the Arab Volleyball Association. The Federation organizes all domestic volleyball competitions for men and women, and rules over beach volleyball activities in the country for both genders.
