= Saudi Arabia Volleyball Association =

Saudi Arabia athletic organization

Saudi Arabia Volleyball Federation
- Sport: Volleyball; Beach volleyball
- Jurisdiction: Saudi Arabia
- Abbreviation: SAVBA
- Founded: 1963
- Affiliation: FIVB
- Affiliation date: 1963
- Headquarters: Riyadh
- Location: Saudi Arabia
- President: Mr. Faris Al-Otaibi
- Chairman: Mr. Waleed Almokbel

Official website
- saudivb.org
- (Saudi Arabia)

The Saudi Arabian Volleyball Federation (SAVBA) (Arabic: الإتحاد العربي السعودي للكرة الطائرة), is the governing body for volleyball in Saudi Arabia since 1963.

== History ==
The Saudi Arabian Federation has been recognised by FIVB from 1963 and is a member of the Asian Volleyball Confederation and Arab Volleyball Association.
