= Qatar women's national volleyball team =

National sports team

Qatar
- Association: Qatar Volleyball Federation
- Confederation: AVC
- FIVB ranking: NR (24 May 2026)

Uniforms
Home	Away

The Qatar women's national volleyball team represents Qatar in international women's volleyball competitions and friendly matches.

The team has finished as runners-up in the 2005 and 2007 editions of the 1st Women Games of the Capitals, Islamic and Asian Countries.

== Team ==
=== Current squad ===
- Head Coach : (Argentina) Lucas Carullo

The following is the Qatar roster for the 2025 Islamic Solidarity Games.

No.	Name	Position	Date of birth	Height	Club
2	Aisha Al-Alawi	OH	29 October 2009 (age 16)	1.72 m (5 ft 8 in)	
5	Huda Al-Mobark	S	3 May 2002 (age 24)	1.66 m (5 ft 5 in)	
7	Sheqaf Ismail		29 September 1998 (age 27)	1.71 m (5 ft 7 in)	
8	Sarah Saadawi		16 July 2006 (age 20)	1.65 m (5 ft 5 in)	
9	Meriem Mouhoub	S	10 March 2010 (age 16)	1.62 m (5 ft 4 in)	
10	Ludan Eisa	O	1 November 2007 (age 18)	1.76 m (5 ft 9 in)	
14	Al-Mayasa Deyab	OH	17 September 2010 (age 16)	1.75 m (5 ft 9 in)	
16	Lujain Mahmoud	MB	11 November 2008 (age 17)	1.74 m (5 ft 9 in)	
18	Tasneem Ali	O	18 April 2008 (age 18)	1.65 m (5 ft 5 in)	
19	Hana Al-Khater	L	9 March 2008 (age 18)	1.66 m (5 ft 5 in)	
20	Leyla Bahmanzadeh		22 July 2000 (age 26)	1.70 m (5 ft 7 in)	
25	Penda Fatma Gadiaga	OH	10 October 2008 (age 17)	1.76 m (5 ft 9 in)	

=== Recent call-ups ===
The following players have also been called up to the Qatar squad within the last 12 months.

Name	Position	Date of birth	Height	Club	Latest call-up
Lamis Al-Salman	L	8 March 2010 (age 16)	1.61 m (5 ft 3 in)		2025 WAVA Championship
Dana Aboueita	S	4 February 2010 (age 16)	1.65 m (5 ft 5 in)		2025 WAVA Championship
Malak Mohd Hashim	OH	5 April 2006 (age 20)	1.65 m (5 ft 5 in)		2025 WAVA Championship
Marwa Bettihthamou	MB	2 March 2010 (age 16)	1.65 m (5 ft 5 in)		2025 WAVA Championship
Swaralasal Jbarah	OH	22 January 2010 (age 16)	1.67 m (5 ft 6 in)		2025 WAVA Championship

== Tournaments record ==
=== Asian Games ===
- (Japan) 2026 — TBD

=== West Asian Championship ===
- (Jordan) 2022 — 8th place
- (Jordan) 2025 — 6th place (last)
- (Jordan) 2026 — 4th place (last)

=== Arab Games ===
- (Qatar) 2011 — 5th place (last)
- (Algeria) 2023 — 5th place (last)

=== Islamic Solidarity Games ===
- (Saudi Arabia) 2025 — Withdrew
