= Syria women's national volleyball team =

National sports team

Syria
- Nickname(s): Nosour Qasioun (Arabic: نسور قاسيون, lit. 'Qasioun Eagles')
- Association: Syrian Arab Volleyball Federation (SAVF)
- Confederation: AVC
- Head coach: (Syria) Hassan Sekhal
- FIVB ranking: NR (24 May 2026)

Uniforms
Home	Away

World Championship
- Appearances: none

Asian Championship
- Appearances: none
- Official website

Syria women's national volleyball team
Medal record

Pan Arab Games
Bronze medal – third place	1992 Damascus	Team

The Syrian women's national volleyball team (Arabic: سوريا للكرة الطائرة للسيدات) represents Syria at the international volleyball competitions and friendly matches. On 4 September 2022, the team was ranked 120th in the world.

== Honours ==
=== West Asia Championship ===
- (Jordan) 2022: 6th

=== Mediterranean Games ===
- (Syria) 1987: 5th

=== Pan Arab Games ===
- (Syria) 1992: (bronze)
- (Jordan) 1999: 4th

== Team ==
=== Current squad ===
The following is the Syrian roster in the 2022 West Asia Championship.

- Head coach: Hassan Sakhal
1. Darren Ibrahim
2. Noor Dwaier
3. Sarma Jabbour
4. Khulouf Verses
5. Ana Asf
6. Sarah Rahmon
7. Hind Daaboul
8. Lama Al-Batal
9. Sally Hamada
10. Santa Al-Salama
11. Zina Sawaf
12. Maggie Sheikh
13. Ruhaif Al-Hassan

== See also ==
- Syria men's national volleyball team
