= Lebanon men's national volleyball team =

National sports team

Lebanon
- Association: Lebanese Volleyball Association (LVA)
- Confederation: AVC
- FIVB ranking: 117 ▲17 (1 October 2026)

Uniforms
Home	Away

World Championship
- Appearances: 1 (First in 1952)
- Best result: 9th (1952)

Asian Championship
- Appearances: 3 (First in 1979)
- Best result: 8th (2013)

The Lebanon men's national volleyball team is the national men's volleyball team of Lebanon. The team's represent the country in the regional and international competitions.

== Competition record ==
=== World Championship ===
- (Czechoslovakia) 1949 – Did not enter
- (Soviet Union) 1952 – 9th place
- (France) 1956 to (Philippines) 2025 – Did not enter or Did not qualify

=== Asian Championship ===
Asian Championships record
Year	Round	Position	Pld	W	L
(Australia) 1975					
(Bahrain) 1979	Group Stages	13th	5	2	3
(Japan) 1983	Did not qualify				
(Kuwait) 1987	Did not qualify				
(South Korea) 1989	Did not qualify				
(Australia) 1991	Did not qualify				
(Thailand) 1993	Did not qualify				
(South Korea) 1995	Did not qualify				
(Qatar) 1997	Did not qualify				
(Iran) 1999	Did not qualify				
(South Korea) 2001	Did not qualify				
(China) 2003	Did not qualify				
(Thailand) 2005	Did not qualify				
(Indonesia) 2007	Did not qualify				
(Philippines) 2009	Preliminary round	11th	9	5	4
(Iran) 2011	Did not qualify				
(United Arab Emirates) 2013	Quarterfinals	8th	7	2	5
(Iran) 2015	Did not qualify				
(Indonesia) 2017	Did not qualify				
(Iran) 2019	Did not qualify				
(Japan) 2021	Did not qualify				
(Iran) 2023	Did not qualify				
(Japan) 2026	Did not qualify				
Total	0 Titles	3/23	21	9	12

== See also ==
- Sport in Lebanon
