= United Arab Emirates women's national volleyball team =

National sports team

United Arab Emirates
- Association: United Arab Emirates Volleyball Federation
- Confederation: AVC
- FIVB ranking: NR (2 October 2026)

Uniforms
Home	Away

The United Arab Emirates women's national volleyball team represents the United Arab Emirates in international women's volleyball competitions and friendly matches.

The team appeared at the GCC Women's Games several times.
