= Volleyball at the Islamic Solidarity Games =

Volleyball at the Islamic Solidarity Games was introduced for men at the first edition in 2005 Islamic Solidarity Games held in Mecca. Women's volleyball competition was introduced at the fourth edition of Islamic Solidarity Games held in Baku.

== Men ==
=== Summary ===
Year	Host	Gold medal game			Bronze medal game
Year	Host	Gold Medalists	Score	Silver Medalists	Bronze Medalists	Score	4th place
2005; Details	(Saudi Arabia); Mecca	Iran	3 – 2	Egypt	Algeria	3 – 0	Saudi Arabia
2010	(Iran); Tehran	Cancelled			Cancelled
2013; Details	(Indonesia); Palembang	Iran	3 – 1	Egypt	Turkey	3 – 2	Indonesia
2017; Details	(Azerbaijan); Baku	Iran	3 – 0	Azerbaijan	Algeria	3 – 1	Turkey
2021; Details	(Turkey); Konya	Iran	3 – 1	Cameroon	Turkey	3 – 1	Azerbaijan
2025; Details	(Saudi Arabia); Riyadh	Iran	3 – 1	Turkey	Bahrain	3 – 1	Qatar

=== Medal table ===
Rank	Nation	Gold	Silver	Bronze	Total
1	Iran	5	0	0	5
2	Egypt	0	2	0	2
3	Turkey	0	1	2	3
4	Azerbaijan	0	1	0	1
4	Cameroon	0	1	0	1
6	Algeria	0	0	2	2
7	Bahrain	0	0	1	1
Totals (7 entries)		5	5	5	15

== Women ==
=== Summary ===
Year	Host	Gold medal game			Bronze medal game
Year	Host	Gold Medalists	Score	Silver Medalists	Bronze Medalists	Score	4th place
2017; Details	(Azerbaijan); Baku	Azerbaijan	3 – 1	Turkey	Kyrgyzstan	3 – 0	Tajikistan
2021; Details	(Turkey); Konya	Turkey	3 – 0	Iran	Azerbaijan	3 – 0	Cameroon
2025; Details	(Saudi Arabia); Riyadh	Turkey	3 – 0	Azerbaijan	Iran	3 – 0	Tajikistan

=== Medal table ===
Rank	Nation	Gold	Silver	Bronze	Total
1	Turkey	2	1	0	3
2	Azerbaijan	1	1	1	3
3	Iran	0	1	1	2
4	Kyrgyzstan	0	0	1	1
Totals (4 entries)		3	3	3	9
