= 2025 CAVA Women's Volleyball Championship =

Central Asian volleyball tournament

Tournament details
- Host country: Uzbekistan
- City: Tashkent
- Dates: 1–5 October
- Teams: 4 (from 1 confederation)
- Venue: 1 (in 1 host city)

Final positions
- Champions: Iran (2nd title)
- Runners-up: Uzbekistan
- Third place: Kyrgyzstan
- Fourth place: Tajikistan

Tournament awards
- MVP: (Iran) Fatemeh Khalili Chermahini

The 2025 CAVA Women's Volleyball Championship was the second edition of the CAVA Women's Volleyball Championship, an annual international volleyball tournament for women's national volleyball teams under the Central Asian Volleyball Association (CAVA).

The tournament was hosted in Tashkent, Uzbekistan from 1 to 5 October 2025. It was originally set to be hosted in Nepal before it was moved to Uzbekistan. Iran won the championships.

== Round robin ==
Pos	Team	Pld	W	L	Pts	SW	SL	SR	SPW	SPL	SPR	Qualification
1	Iran	3	3	0	9	9	0	MAX	225	117	1.923	Final
2	Uzbekistan	3	2	1	6	6	3	2.000	195	159	1.226	Final
3	Kyrgyzstan	3	1	2	3	3	6	0.500	168	201	0.836	3rd place match
4	Tajikistan	3	0	3	0	0	9	0.000	114	225	0.507	3rd place match

Source: FIVB

== Final round ==
=== 3rd place match ===
Date	Time	Venue		Score		Set 1	Set 2	Set 3	Set 4	Set 5	Total	Report
5 Oct	—	Olympic City Volleyball Hall	Kyrgyzstan	3–0	Tajikistan	25–16	25–15	25–10			75–41	Report

=== Final ===
Date	Time	Venue		Score		Set 1	Set 2	Set 3	Set 4	Set 5	Total	Report
5 Oct	—	Olympic City Volleyball Hall	Iran	3–0	Uzbekistan	25–14	25–14	25–19			75–47	Report

== Final standing ==
Rank	Team
1st place, gold medalist(s)	Iran
2nd place, silver medalist(s)	Uzbekistan
3rd place, bronze medalist(s)	Kyrgyzstan
4	Tajikistan

Source: AVC

2025 CAVA Women's Volleyball Championship winners

Iran
First title

Head coach
Lee Do-hee

== Awards ==
- Most valuable player
  Fatemeh Khalili Chermahini (IRI)
- Best setter
  Mukhlisakhon Jalolova (UZB)
- Best outside spikers
  Fatemeh Khalili Chermahini (IRI)
  Malikakhon Tursunpulatova (UZB)
- Best middle blockers
  Reyhane Karimi (IRI)
  Saikal Amirakulova (UZB)
- Best opposite spiker
  Aytak Salamat (IRI)
- Best libero
  Sevinchkhon Ikromova (UZB)

Source: AVC
