= CAVA Women's Volleyball Championship =

International volleyball competition in Asia

- Current season, competition or edition: 2026 CAVA Women's Volleyball Championship
- Formerly: CAVA Women's Volleyball Nations League (2024)
- Sport: Volleyball
- Founded: 2024
- First season: 2024
- No. of teams: 5
- Continent: Central and South Asia (CAVA)
- Most recent champion: Iran (2nd title) (2026)
- Most titles: Iran (2 titles)
- Website: Asian Volleyball Confederation

The CAVA Women's Volleyball Championship, formerly known as CAVA Women's Volleyball Nations League, is an international volleyball competition in Central and South Asia contested by the senior women's national teams of the members of Central Asian Volleyball Association (CAZVA), the sport's regional governing body. The current champions Iran won their second title in the third edition of 2026.

== Results summary ==
Year	Host	Final			Third place match			Teams
Year	Host	Champions	Score	Runners-up	3rd place	Score	4th place	Teams
2024; Details	(Nepal); Kathmandu	India	3–2	Nepal	Iran	3–0	Sri Lanka	5
2025; Details	(Uzbekistan); Tashkent	Iran	3–0	Uzbekistan	Kyrgyzstan	3–0	Tajikistan	4
2026; Details	(Nepal); Kathmandu	Iran	3–1	Kazakhstan	India	3–1	Nepal	8

=== Teams reaching the top four ===
Team	Winners	Runners-up	Third-place	Fourth-place
Iran	2 (2025, 2026)		1 (2024)	
India	1 (2024)		1 (2026)	
Nepal		1 (2024)		1 (2026)
Uzbekistan		1 (2025)		
Kazakhstan		1 (2026)		
Kyrgyzstan			1 (2025)	
Sri Lanka				1 (2024)
Tajikistan				1 (2025)

=== Hosts ===
Times Hosted	Nations	Year(s)
2	Nepal	2024, 2026
1	Uzbekistan	2025

== Medal summary ==
Rank	Nation	Gold	Silver	Bronze	Total
1	Iran	2	0	1	3
2	India	1	0	1	2
3	Kazakhstan	0	1	0	1
3	Nepal	0	1	0	1
3	Uzbekistan	0	1	0	1
6	Kyrgyzstan	0	0	1	1
Totals (6 entries)		3	3	3	9

== Participating nations ==
Nation	(Nepal) 2024	(Uzbekistan) 2025	(Nepal) 2026	Years
Bangladesh	•	•	8th	1
India	1st	•	3rd	2
Iran	3rd	1st	1st	3
Kazakhstan	•	•	2nd	1
Kyrgyzstan	•	3rd	5th	2
Maldives	5th	•	7th	2
Nepal	2nd	•	4th	2
Sri Lanka	4th	•	6th	2
Tajikistan	•	4th	•	1
Uzbekistan	•	2nd	•	1
Total	5	4	8	

=== Debut of teams ===
Year	Debutants	Total
2024	India	5
2024	Iran	5
2024	Maldives	5
2024	Nepal	5
2024	Sri Lanka	5
2025	Kyrgyzstan	3
2025	Tajikistan	3
2025	Uzbekistan	3
2026	Bangladesh	2
2026	Kazakhstan	2

== Awards ==
=== Most Valuable Player ===
Year	Most Valuable Player
2024	(India) Shaalini Saravanan
2025	(Iran) Fatemeh Khalili Chermahini
2026	(Iran) Fatemeh Khalili Chermahini

=== Best Setter ===
Year	Best Setter
2024	(India) Juhi Shaw
2025	(Uzbekistan) Mukhlisakhon Jalolova
2026	(Iran) Shabnam Alikhani

=== Best Libero ===
Year	Best Libero
2024	(Nepal) Salina Shrestha
2025	(Uzbekistan) Sevinchkhon Ikromova
2026	(India) Sathi Das

=== Best Middle Blocker ===
Year	Best Middle Blockers
2024	(India) Soorya S. (Iran) Mobina Sadat Ghafarianambarani
2025	(Iran) Reyhane Karimi (Uzbekistan) Saikal Amirakulova
2026	(India) Shilpa Rajendrandnair Sindhu (Kazakhstan) Yuliya Fomenko

=== Best Outside Hitter ===
Year	Best Outside Hitter
2024	(Iran) Masoumeh Ghadami Tabaghdehi (India) Shaalini Saravanan
2025	(Iran) Fatemeh Khalili Chermahini (Uzbekistan) Malikakhon Tursunpulatova
2026	(Iran) Fatemeh Khalili Chermahini (Kazakhstan) Kristina Belova

=== Best Opposite Hitter ===
Year	Best Opposite Hitter
2024	(Nepal) Saraswoti Chaudhary
2025	(Iran) Aytak Salamat
2026	(Iran) Elaheh Poorsaleh Shahdehsari

== See also ==
- CAVA Men's Volleyball Nations League
- Asian Women's Volleyball Championship
- Volleyball at the Asian Games
- Eastern Asian Women's Volleyball Championship
- SEA V.League
- Volleyball at the South Asian Games
- SAFF Women's Championship
- SABA Women's Championship
