= 2026 CAVA Women's Volleyball Championship =

Central Asian volleyball tournament held in Kathmandu, Nepal

Tournament details
- Host country: Nepal
- City: Kathmandu
- Dates: 22–29 May
- Teams: 8 (from 1 confederation)
- Venue: 1 (in 1 host city)

Final positions
- Champions: Iran (2nd title)
- Runners-up: Kazakhstan
- Third place: India
- Fourth place: Nepal

Tournament awards
- MVP: (Iran) Fatemeh Khalili Chermahini

The 2026 CAVA Women's Volleyball Championship was the third edition of the CAVA Women's Volleyball Championship, an annual international volleyball tournament for women's national volleyball teams under the Central Asian Volleyball Association (CAVA).

The tournament was hosted in Kathmandu, Nepal from 22 to 29 May 2026. Iran won the championship.

== Pools composition ==
The overview of pools are as follows.

Pool A	Pool B
Nepal (Hosts)	Iran
India	Kazakhstan
Kyrgyzstan	Sri Lanka
Maldives	Bangladesh

== Venue ==
All matches were held at the covered Hall of the Dasharath Stadium sports complex.

== Preliminary round ==
=== Pool A ===
Pos	Team	Pld	W	L	Pts	SW	SL	SR	SPW	SPL	SPR	Qualification
1	India	3	3	0	8	9	2	4.500	254	192	1.323	Semifinals
2	Nepal	3	2	1	7	8	3	2.667	251	195	1.287	Semifinals
3	Kyrgyzstan	3	1	2	3	3	6	0.500	177	208	0.851	5th–8th places
4	Maldives	3	0	3	0	0	9	0.000	138	225	0.613	5th–8th places

Source: AVC

Date	Time	Venue		Score		Set 1	Set 2	Set 3	Set 4	Set 5	Total	Report
22 May	—	Dasharath Stadium Covered Hall	Nepal	2–3	India	21–25	25–20	25–18	21–25	9–15	101–103	Report
22 May	—	Dasharath Stadium Covered Hall	Kyrgyzstan	3–0	Maldives	25–19	25–16	25–22			75–57	Report
23 May	14:30	Dasharath Stadium Covered Hall	India	3–0	Maldives	25–9	25–14	25–17			75–40	Report
23 May	17:00	Dasharath Stadium Covered Hall	Nepal	3–0	Kyrgyzstan	25–18	25–20	25–13			75–51	Report
24 May	17:00	Dasharath Stadium Covered Hall	Nepal	3–0	Maldives	25–12	25–9	25–20			75–41	Report
25 May	—	Dasharath Stadium Covered Hall	India	3–0	Kyrgyzstan	25–14	26–24	25–13			76–51	Report

=== Pool B ===
Pos	Team	Pld	W	L	Pts	SW	SL	SR	SPW	SPL	SPR	Qualification
1	Iran	3	3	0	9	9	0	MAX	225	129	1.744	Semifinals
2	Kazakhstan	3	2	1	6	6	3	2.000	214	142	1.507	Semifinals
3	Sri Lanka	3	1	2	3	3	6	0.500	157	191	0.822	5th–8th places
4	Bangladesh	3	0	3	0	0	9	0.000	91	225	0.404	5th–8th places

Source: AVC

Date	Time	Venue		Score		Set 1	Set 2	Set 3	Set 4	Set 5	Total	Report
22 May	—	Dasharath Stadium Covered Hall	Iran	3–0	Bangladesh	25–6	25–9	25–10			75–25	Report
23 May	12:00	Dasharath Stadium Covered Hall	Kazakhstan	3–0	Sri Lanka	25–9	25–18	25–15			75–42	Report
24 May	12:00	Dasharath Stadium Covered Hall	Iran	3–0	Sri Lanka	25–16	25–13	25–11			75–40	Report
24 May	14:30	Dasharath Stadium Covered Hall	Bangladesh	0–3	Kazakhstan	5–25	9–25	11–25			25–75	Report
25 May	—	Dasharath Stadium Covered Hall	Sri Lanka	3–0	Bangladesh	25–19	25–9	25–13			75–41	Report
25 May	—	Dasharath Stadium Covered Hall	Iran	3–0	Kazakhstan	25–22	25–20	25–22			75–64	Report

== Final round ==
=== Classification ===
Classification matches began on 26 May involving the bottom two teams in the pool stage.

=== Semifinals ===
Date	Time	Venue		Score		Set 1	Set 2	Set 3	Set 4	Set 5	Total	Report
28 May	14:30	Dasharath Stadium Covered Hall	India	0–3	Kazakhstan	21–25	17–25	14–25			52–75	Report
28 May	17:00	Dasharath Stadium Covered Hall	Iran	3–0	Nepal	25–20	25–15	25–11			75–46	Report

=== 3rd place match ===
Date	Time	Venue		Score		Set 1	Set 2	Set 3	Set 4	Set 5	Total	Report
29 May	13:00	Dasharath Stadium Covered Hall	India	3–1	Nepal	25–22	25–23	15–25	25–22		90–92	Report

=== Final ===
Date	Time	Venue		Score		Set 1	Set 2	Set 3	Set 4	Set 5	Total	Report
29 May	16:30	Dasharath Stadium Covered Hall	Iran	3–1	Kazakhstan	25–18	19–25	25–15	25–21		94–79	Report

== Final standing ==
Rank	Team
1st place, gold medalist(s)	Iran
2nd place, silver medalist(s)	Kazakhstan
3rd place, bronze medalist(s)	India
4	Nepal
5	Kyrgyzstan
6	Sri Lanka
7	Maldives
8	Bangladesh

Source: AVC

2026 CAVA Women's Volleyball Championship winners

Iran
Second title

14–woman roster
Shabnam Alikhani, Sepinoud Dast Barjan, Reyhaneh Karimi, Elaheh Pour-Saleh, Zahra Karimi, Fatemeh Khalili, Zahra Salehi, Masoumeh Ghadami, Seyedeh Negar Hashemi, Hasti Vahedi, Negar Abbasi, Aida Valinejad, Yasna Ahankoub, and Shaghayegh Hassankhani.
Head coach
Lee Do-hee

== Awards ==
- Most valuable player
  Fatemeh Khalili (IRI)
- Best setter
  Shabnam Alikhani (IRI)
- Best outside spikers
  Fatemeh Khalili (IRI)
  Kristina Belova (KAZ)
- Best middle blockers
  Shilpa Rajendrandnair Sindhu (IND)
  Yuliya Fomenko (KAZ)
- Best opposite spiker
  Elaheh Poorsaleh Shahdehsari (IRI)
- Best libero
  Sathi Das (IND)

Source: AVC
