= CAVA Women's Cup =

International volleyball competition in Asia

- Upcoming season or competition: 2025 CAVA Women's Volleyball Cup
- Formerly: CAVA Women's Volleyball Challenge Cup (2023–2024)
- Sport: Volleyball
- Founded: 2023
- First season: 2023
- No. of teams: 4
- Continent: Central and South Asia (CAVA)
- Most recent champion: Kyrgyzstan (2nd title)
- Most titles: Kyrgyzstan (2 titles)
- Website: Asian Volleyball Confederation

The CAVA Women's Cup, formerly known as CAVA Women's Volleyball Challenge Cup, is an international volleyball competition in Central and South Asia contested by the senior women's national teams of the members of Central Asian Volleyball Association (CAZVA), the sport's regional governing body. The current champion is Kyrgyzstan, which won its second title at the 2025 edition.

== Results summary ==
Year	Host	Final			Third place match			Teams
Year	Host	Champions	Score	Runners-up	3rd place	Score	4th place	Teams
2023; Details	(Nepal); Kathmandu	India	3–0	Kazakhstan	Nepal	3–1	Uzbekistan	8
2024; Details	(Maldives); Malé	Kyrgyzstan	3–0	Maldives	Tajikistan	3–1	Afghanistan	4
2025; Details	(Maldives); Malé	Kyrgyzstan	3–1	Maldives	Bangladesh	3–0	Afghanistan	4

=== Teams reaching the top four ===
Team	Winners	Runners-up	Third-place	Fourth-place
Kyrgyzstan	2 (2024, 2025)			
India	1 (2023)			
Maldives		2 (2024, 2025)		
Kazakhstan		1 (2023)		
Nepal			1 (2023)	
Tajikistan			1 (2024)	
Bangladesh			1 (2025)	
Afghanistan				2 (2024, 2025)
Uzbekistan				1 (2023)

=== Hosts ===
Times Hosted	Nations	Year(s)
2	Maldives	2024, 2025
1	Nepal	2023

== Medal summary ==
Rank	Nation	Gold	Silver	Bronze	Total
1	Kyrgyzstan	2	0	0	2
2	India	1	0	0	1
3	Maldives	0	2	0	2
4	Kazakhstan	0	1	0	1
5	Bangladesh	0	0	1	1
5	Nepal	0	0	1	1
5	Tajikistan	0	0	1	1
Totals (7 entries)		3	3	3	9

== Participating nations ==
Nation	(Nepal) 2023	(Maldives) 2024	(Maldives) 2025	Years
Afghanistan		4th	4th	2
Bangladesh	8th		3rd	2
India	1st			1
Kazakhstan	2nd			1
Kyrgyzstan	6th	1st	1st	3
Maldives	7th	2nd	2nd	3
Nepal	3rd			1
Sri Lanka	5th			1
Tajikistan		3rd		1
Uzbekistan	4th			1
Total	8	4	4	

=== Debut of teams ===
Year	Debutants	Total
2023	Bangladesh	8
2023	India	8
2023	Kazakhstan	8
2023	Kyrgyzstan	8
2023	Maldives	8
2023	Nepal	8
2023	Sri Lanka	8
2023	Uzbekistan	8
2024	Afghanistan	2
2024	Tajikistan	2

== Awards ==
=== Most Valuable Player ===
Year	Most Valuable Player
2023	(India) Nirmal Tanwar
2024	(Kyrgyzstan) Saikal Amirakulova
2025	(Kyrgyzstan) Nurzhamal Bolotbekova

=== Best Setter ===
Year	Best Setter
2023	(India) Jini K. S.
2024	(Maldives) Fathimath Joozan Zareer
2025	(Maldives) Fathimath Joozan Zareer

=== Best Libero ===
Year	Best Libero
2023	(Nepal) Salina Shrestha
2024	(Kyrgyzstan) Asema Seiitbekova
2025	(Kyrgyzstan) Asema Seiitbekova

=== Best Middle Blocker ===
Year	Best Middle Blockers
2023	(India) Soorya S.
2024	(Kyrgyzstan) Saikal Amirakulova (Tajikistan) Aqnazarova Gordofarid
2025	(Kyrgyzstan) Saikal Amirakulova (Maldives) Nareema Idurees

=== Best Outside Hitter ===
Year	Best Libero
2023	(Kyrgyzstan) Uatayeva Bota
2024	(Kyrgyzstan) Roza Rasubek Kyzy (Afghanistan) Roghayeh Mohammadi
2025	(Kyrgyzstan) Nurzhamal Bolotbekova (Maldives) Hawwa Rashidha

=== Best Opposite Hitter ===
Year	Best Libero
2023	(Kazakhstan) Zarina Sitkazinova
2024	(Maldives) Aminath Shaha Shamin
2025	(Maldives) Aminath Shaha Shamin
