= Volleyball at the 2017 Islamic Solidarity Games =

Islamic Solidary Games Volleyball Event

- Venue: Baku Crystal Hall
- Dates: 11–21 May

Volleyball at the 2017 Islamic Solidarity Games was held at Baku Crystal Hall, Azerbaijan from 11 to 21 May 2017.

== Medal table ==
Rank	Nation	Gold	Silver	Bronze	Total
1	Azerbaijan (AZE)	1	1	0	2
2	Iran (IRI)	1	0	0	1
3	Turkey (TUR)	0	1	0	1
4	Algeria (ALG)	0	0	1	1
4	Kyrgyzstan (KGZ)	0	0	1	1
Totals (5 entries)		2	2	2	6

== Medalists ==
Event	Gold	Silver	Bronze
Men	Iran; Rasoul Aghchehli; Bijan Barati; Esmaeil Mosafer; Akbar Valaei; Ali Asghar Mojarrad; Mirbabak Mousavi; Esmaeil Talebi; Tayyeb Eini; Tohid Samadi; Amir Hossein Esfandiar; Ali Ramezani; Javad Karimi; Mahmoud Rasouli; Pouria Yali	Azerbaijan; Vugar Bayramov; Tural Hasanli; Javid Suleymanov; Emil Abdullayev; Rasul Ibragimov; Parviz Samedov; Dmitriy Obodnikov; Bartłomiej Lipiński; Aleksey Chervyakov; Ivan Kazachkov; Dmitriy Baranov; Yusuf Erdem; Miłosz Hebda; Kanan Allahverdiyev	Algeria; Ilyas Achouri; Sofiane Bouyoucef; Ahmed Amir Kerboua; Khaled Kessai; Mohamed Amine Oumessad; Ayoub Dekkiche; Toufik Mahdjoubi; Sadem Haddad; Akram Dekkiche; Amar Seifeddine Benmehana; Mohamed Oualid Abi-Ayad; Islam Ould Cherchali; Billel Soualem; Soufiane Hosni
Women	Azerbaijan; Jeyran Aliyeva; Kseniya Poznyak; Odina Bayramova; Ayshan Abdulazimova; Olena Hasanova; Yelyzaveta Samadova; Jana Kulan; Katerina Zhidkova; Valeriya Mammadova; Krystsina Yagubova; Aynur Karimova; Oksana Kiselyova; Polina Rahimova; Shafagat Habibova	Turkey; Melike Yılmaz; Bihter Dumanoğlu; Gizem Mısra Aşçı; Yağmur Mislina Kılıç; Rida Erlalelitepe; Ada Germen; Su Zent; Meliha İsmailoğlu; Hümay Topaloğlu; Hande Naz Şimşek; Janset Cemre Erkul; Arelya Karasoy; Nursevil Aydınlar; Buse Melis Kara	Kyrgyzstan; Nailya Aliyeva; Aidana Abdykadyr Kyzy; Madina Mirlan Kyzy; Altynai Samat Kyzy; Anastasiia Evolenko; Anastasiia Iltner; Aliia Shumkarbekova; Marina Grishaeva; Aidai Kadyrova; Iuliana Morozova

== Men ==
=== Preliminary round ===
==== Group A ====
Pos	Team	Pld	W	L	Pts	SW	SL	SR	SPW	SPL	SPR	Qualification
1	Azerbaijan	4	4	0	11	12	2	6.000	328	277	1.184	Semifinals
2	Turkey	4	3	1	9	11	5	2.200	369	289	1.277	Semifinals
3	Pakistan	4	2	2	7	8	7	1.143	337	316	1.066	
4	Turkmenistan	4	1	3	3	4	9	0.444	286	291	0.983	
5	Palestine	4	0	4	0	0	12	0.000	150	297	0.505	

Date	Time		Score		Set 1	Set 2	Set 3	Set 4	Set 5	Total	Report
11 May	10:00	Turkey	3–0	Turkmenistan	25–16	25–14	27–25			77–55	Report
11 May	21:30	Azerbaijan	3–0	Pakistan	25–22	25–18	25–21			75–61	Report
13 May	21:30	Azerbaijan	3–2	Turkey	28–26	13–25	25–17	19–25	18–16	103–109	Report
15 May	10:00	Turkey	3–2	Pakistan	25–17	23–25	26–24	22–25	15–11	111–102	Report
15 May	12:30	Turkmenistan	3–0	Palestine	25–15	25–12	25–13			75–40	Report
16 May	19:00	Palestine	0–3	Azerbaijan	14–25	16–25	12–25			42–75	Report
17 May	10:00	Pakistan	3–0	Palestine	25–8	25–16	25–15			75–39	Report
17 May	12:30	Azerbaijan	3–0	Turkmenistan	25–21	25–22	25–22			75–65	Report
19 May	10:00	Turkey	3–0	Palestine	25–15	25–8	25–6			75–29	Report
19 May	12:30	Turkmenistan	1–3	Pakistan	22–25	22–25	26–24	21–25		91–99	Report

==== Group B ====
Pos	Team	Pld	W	L	Pts	SW	SL	SR	SPW	SPL	SPR	Qualification
1	Iran	4	4	0	12	12	1	12.000	327	265	1.234	Semifinals
2	Algeria	4	3	1	9	10	6	1.667	391	355	1.101	Semifinals
3	Morocco	4	2	2	6	7	8	0.875	319	334	0.955	
4	Qatar	4	1	3	3	5	10	0.500	332	359	0.925	
5	Saudi Arabia	4	0	4	0	3	12	0.250	308	364	0.846	

Date	Time		Score		Set 1	Set 2	Set 3	Set 4	Set 5	Total	Report
12 May	10:00	Qatar	1–3	Algeria	35–37	25–14	17–25	21–25		98–101	Report
12 May	12:30	Iran	3–0	Saudi Arabia	25–18	25–23	25–18			75–59	Report
14 May	10:00	Morocco	1–3	Algeria	25–18	9–25	21–25	21–25		76–93	Report
14 May	21:30	Iran	3–0	Qatar	25–21	25–23	25–11			75–55	Report
15 May	21:30	Qatar	3–1	Saudi Arabia	25–16	25–23	21–25	25–23		96–87	Report
16 May	10:00	Iran	3–0	Morocco	25–15	25–23	25–11			75–49	Report
18 May	10:00	Iran	3–1	Algeria	18–25	28–26	31–29	25–22		102–102	Report
18 May	12:30	Saudi Arabia	1–3	Morocco	17–25	20–25	25–23	21–25		83–98	Report
19 May	17:00	Qatar	1–3	Morocco	18–25	22–25	25–21	18–25		83–96	Report
19 May	19:30	Algeria	3–1	Saudi Arabia	25–20	25–16	20–25	25–18		95–79	Report

=== Final round ===
Semifinals
20 May
Iran	3
Turkey	2
20 May
Azerbaijan	3
Algeria	1

Gold medal game
21 May
Iran	3
Azerbaijan	0
Bronze medal game
21 May
Turkey	1
Algeria	3

==== Semifinals ====
Date	Time		Score		Set 1	Set 2	Set 3	Set 4	Set 5	Total	Report
20 May	17:00	Iran	3–2	Turkey	18–25	25–21	23–25	25–21	20–18	111–110	Report
20 May	19:30	Azerbaijan	3–1	Algeria	28–26	25–21	20–25	25–21		98–93	Report

==== Bronze medal game ====
Date	Time		Score		Set 1	Set 2	Set 3	Set 4	Set 5	Total	Report
21 May	17:00	Algeria	3–1	Turkey	20–25	25–22	25–18	25–22		95–87	Report

==== Gold medal game ====
Date	Time		Score		Set 1	Set 2	Set 3	Set 4	Set 5	Total	Report
21 May	19:30	Iran	3–0	Azerbaijan	25–16	29–27	25–18			79–61	Report

== Women ==
=== Preliminary round ===
Pos	Team	Pld	W	L	Pts	SW	SL	SR	SPW	SPL	SPR	Qualification
1	Azerbaijan	3	3	0	9	9	0	MAX	230	110	2.091	Semifinals
2	Turkey	3	2	1	6	6	3	2.000	216	133	1.624	Semifinals
3	Kyrgyzstan	3	1	2	3	3	7	0.429	145	220	0.659	Semifinals
4	Tajikistan	3	0	3	0	1	9	0.111	117	245	0.478	Semifinals

Date	Time		Score		Set 1	Set 2	Set 3	Set 4	Set 5	Total	Report
11 May	12:30	Turkey	3–0	Tajikistan	25–8	25–6	25–7			75–21	Report
11 May	19:00	Azerbaijan	3–0	Kyrgyzstan	25–7	25–3	25–8			75–18	Report
13 May	19:00	Azerbaijan	3–0	Tajikistan	25–9	25–7	25–10			75–26	Report
14 May	19:00	Azerbaijan	3–0	Turkey	25–18	30–28	25–20			80–66	Report
15 May	19:00	Turkey	3–0	Kyrgyzstan	25–10	25–11	25–11			75–32	Report
16 May	21:30	Kyrgyzstan	3–1	Tajikistan	25–23	20–25	25–16	25–6		95–70	Report

=== Final round ===
Semifinals
17 May
Azerbaijan	3
Tajikistan	0
17 May
Turkey	3
Kyrgyzstan	0

Gold medal game
18 May
Azerbaijan	3
Turkey	1
Bronze medal game
18 May
Tajikistan	0
Kyrgyzstan	3

==== Semifinals ====
Date	Time		Score		Set 1	Set 2	Set 3	Set 4	Set 5	Total	Report
17 May	17:00	Azerbaijan	3–0	Tajikistan	25–6	25–10	25–6			75–22	Report
17 May	19:30	Turkey	3–0	Kyrgyzstan	25–9	25–14	25–12			75–35	Report

==== Bronze medal game ====
Date	Time		Score		Set 1	Set 2	Set 3	Set 4	Set 5	Total	Report
18 May	17:00	Tajikistan	0–3	Kyrgyzstan	10–25	12–25	16–25			38–75	Report

==== Gold medal game ====
Date	Time		Score		Set 1	Set 2	Set 3	Set 4	Set 5	Total	Report
18 May	19:30	Azerbaijan	3–1	Turkey	25–12	23–25	25–20	25–21		98–78	Report
