= Büşra Güneş =

(footballer, born 1997)

Personal information
- Full name: Büşra Şahin Güneş
- Born: Büşra Şahin; August 8, 1997 (age 29); Milas, Muğla, Turkey
- Height: 1.90 m (6 ft 3 in)
- Weight: 67 kg (148 lb)
- Spike: 300 cm (120 in)
- Block: 285 cm (112 in)

Volleyball information
- Position: Middle-blocker
- Current club: Türk Hava Yolları Spor Kulübü

Career
Years	Teams
2010–2014	Milas Belediyespor
2014–2019	Yeşilyurt
2019–2022	Türk Hava Yolları Spor Kulübü
2021–2022	Adam Voleybol
2022–2023	PTT Spor
2023–2024	Çukurova Belediyesi Spor Kulübü
2024	Kuzeyboru
2024–2025	Aras Kargo Spor Kulübü
2025–2026	Galatasaray
2026–	Türk Hava Yolları Spor Kulübü

National team
Turkey

Büşra Güneş (born Büşra Şahin, 8 August 1997) is a Turkish professional volleyball player. She is 1.90 m (6 ft 3 in) tall at 67 kg (148 lb) and plays in the Middle-blocker position.

== Club career ==
On July 3, 2025, she signed with Galatasaray of the Turkish Sultanlar Ligi.

== Honours ==
=== Clubs ===
- 2025–26 CEV Cup Champion, with Galatasaray
