= Volleyball at the 2025 Islamic Solidarity Games =

Volleyball competition

- Venue: Boulevard Arena 01C
- Dates: 4—13 November 2025
- Competitors: 132 from 9 nations

The volleyball competition at the 2025 Islamic Solidarity Games in Riyadh was organized between 4—13 November 2025. The volleyball competition took place at Boulevard Arena 01C in Riyadh.

== Participating nations ==
A total of 112 athletes from 8 nations competed in volleyball at the 2025 Islamic Solidarity Games:

1. Afghanistan (12)
2. Azerbaijan (12)
3. Bahrain (12)
4. Chad (12)
5. Iran (24)
6. Qatar (12)
7. Saudi Arabia (12)
8. Tajikistan (12)
9. Turkey (24)

=== Widthrawn teams ===
A total of 96 athletes from 6 nations were withdrawn prior to the start of the event, despite their National Committees having confirmed their participation. The ISG's official list of volleyball participants still includes these athletes; however, they did not take part in the competition itself.

1. Algeria (24)
2. Egypt (24)
3. Qatar (women, 12)
4. Sierra Leone (12)
5. Turkmenistan (12)
6. Uzbekistan (12)

== Medal table ==
Rank	Nation	Gold	Silver	Bronze	Total
1	Turkey	1	1	0	2
2	Iran	1	0	1	2
3	Azerbaijan	0	1	0	1
4	Bahrain	0	0	1	1
Totals (4 entries)		2	2	2	6

== Medalists ==
Event	Gold	Silver	Bronze
Men	Iran; Ali Hajipour; Ali Ramezani; Alireza Farahani; Alireza Abdolhamidi; Amirreza Aftab Azari; Arshia Behnezhad; Ehsan Daneshdoust; Mohammad Reza Hazratpour; Pouya Ariakhah; Seyed Eisa Naseri; Seyed Amir Sadati; Yousef Kazemi Poshtpari	Turkey; Arda Bostan; Hilmi Şahin; Berk Dilmenler; Can Koç; Cansın Ogbai Enaboifo; Onur Günaydı; Gökçen Yüksel; Yiğit Hamza Aslan; Mustafa Cengiz; Selim Yıldız; Yiğit Savaş Kaplan; Abdulsamet Yalçın	Bahrain; Abbas Alkhabbaz; Ali Khamis; Ayman Haroon; Hasan Warqaa; Husain Mansoor; Mahmood Ahmed; Mahmood Alafyah; Mahmood Salman; Mohamed Abdulla Yaqoob; Mohamed Anan; Naser Anan; Sayed Hashem Ali
Women	Turkey; Aslı Tecimer; Ayşe Çürük; Berka Buse Özden; Defne Başyolcu; Deniz Uyanık; Dilay Özdemir; Nazlı Eda Kafkas; Ege Melisa Bükmen; Karmen Aksoy; Liza Safronova; Merve Nur Öztürk; Selin Adalı	Azerbaijan; Anstasiia Baidiuk; Aynur Imanova; Ayshan Abdulazimova; Bayaz Guluyeva; Elizaveta Burkova; Kseniya Pavlenko; Margarita Stepanenko; Nilufar Aghazada; Ulkar Karimova; Valeriia Burkova; Valeriya Kondratyeva; Yuliya Karimova	Iran; Aytak Salamat; Elaheh Poorsaleh; Fatemeh Khalili; Ghazaleh Bostan; Kimiya Kiani; Masoumeh Ghadami; Reyhane Karimi; Sepinood Dastbarjan; Shaghayegh Hassan Khani; Zahra Karimi; Zahra Moghani; Zahra Salehi

== Men ==
=== Preliminary round ===
Pos	Team	Pld	W	L	Pts	SW	SL	SR	SPW	SPL	SPR
1	Iran	5	5	0	14	15	4	3.750	453	367	1.234
2	Turkey	5	4	1	12	13	4	3.250	313	340	0.921
3	Bahrain	5	3	2	10	11	8	1.375	446	426	1.047
4	Qatar	5	2	3	6	8	10	0.800	396	405	0.978
5	Saudi Arabia	5	1	4	3	6	12	0.500	380	436	0.872
6	Chad	5	0	5	0	0	15	0.000	266	380	0.700

Source: isg2025

Date	Time		Score		Set 1	Set 2	Set 3	Set 4	Set 5	Total	Report
05 Nov	13:00	Turkey	3–1	Qatar	25–20	18–25	25–16	25–20		93–81	Report
05 Nov	16:00	Iran	3–2	Bahrain	25–21	22–25	25–16	22–25	15–7	109–94	Report
05 Nov	19:00	Saudi Arabia	3–0	Chad	26–24	25–16	27–25			78–65	Report
06 Nov	19:00	Qatar	0–3	Iran	22–25	15–25	18–25			55–75	Report
08 Nov	13:00	Chad	0–3	Qatar	16–25	22–25	18–25			56–75	Report
08 Nov	16:00	Iran	3–1	Turkey	21–25	25–23	25–20	25–16		96–84	Report
08 Nov	19:00	Saudi Arabia	1–3	Bahrain	27–25	18–25	16–25	21–25		82–100	Report
09 Nov	18:00	Turkey	3–0	Chad	25–18	25–14	25–16			75–48	Report
10 Nov	13:00	Bahrain	0–3	Turkey	22–25	32–34	22–25			76–84	Report
10 Nov	16:00	Chad	0–3	Iran	15–25	19–25	19–25			53–75	Report
10 Nov	19:00	Saudi Arabia	1–3	Qatar	25–21	16–25	20–25	21–25		82–96	Report
11 Nov	16:00	Bahrain	3–0	Chad	25–20	25–17	27–25			77–62	Report
11 Nov	19:00	Saudi Arabia	0–3	Turkey	16–25	16–25	25–27			57–77	Report
12 Nov	16:00	Qatar	1–3	Bahrain	21–25	20–25	26–24	22–25		89–99	Report
12 Nov	19:00	Saudi Arabia	1–3	Iran	17–25	21–25	25–23	18–25		81–98	Report

==== Bronze medal match ====
Date	Time		Score		Set 1	Set 2	Set 3	Set 4	Set 5	Total	Report
13 Nov	12:00	Qatar	1–3	Bahrain	18–25	25–20	21–25	20–25		84–95	Report

==== Gold medal match ====
Date	Time		Score		Set 1	Set 2	Set 3	Set 4	Set 5	Total	Report
13 Nov	19:00	Iran	3–1	Turkey	25–20	25–20	17–25	25–17		92–82	Report

== Women ==
=== Preliminary round ===
Pos	Team	Pld	W	L	Pts	SW	SL	SR	SPW	SPL	SPR
1	Turkey	4	4	0	12	12	0	MAX	300	113	2.655
2	Azerbaijan	4	3	1	9	9	3	3.000	256	172	1.488
3	Iran	4	2	2	6	6	6	1.000	249	211	1.180
4	Tajikistan	4	1	3	3	3	9	0.333	157	273	0.575
5	Afghanistan	4	0	4	0	0	12	0.000	107	300	0.357

Source: isg2025

Date	Time		Score		Set 1	Set 2	Set 3	Set 4	Set 5	Total	Report
04 Nov	13:00	Iran	0–3	Azerbaijan	11–25	16–25	24–26			51–76	Report
04 Nov	16:00	Turkey	3–0	Afghanistan	25–3	25–4	25–4			75–11	Report
06 Nov	13:00	Azerbaijan	3–0	Tajikistan	25–5	25–11	25–9			75–25	Report
06 Nov	16:00	Turkey	3–0	Iran	25–19	25–16	25–13			75–48	Report
09 Nov	13:00	Afghanistan	0–3	Tajikistan	15–25	16–25	17–25			48–75	Report
09 Nov	16:00	Turkey	3–0	Azerbaijan	25–12	25–8	25–10			75–30	Report
11 Nov	10:00	Iran	3–0	Afghanistan	25–9	25–10	25–8			75–27	Report
11 Nov	13:00	Turkey	3–0	Tajikistan	25–3	25–11	25–10			75–24	Report
12 Nov	10:00	Iran	3–0	Tajikistan	25–11	25–8	25–14			75–33	Report
12 Nov	13:00	Azerbaijan	3–0	Afghanistan	25–7	25–5	25–9			75–21	Report

==== Bronze medal match ====
Date	Time		Score		Set 1	Set 2	Set 3	Set 4	Set 5	Total	Report
13 Nov	09:00	Iran	3–0	Tajikistan	25–2	25–7	25–8			75–17	Report

==== Gold medal match ====
Date	Time		Score		Set 1	Set 2	Set 3	Set 4	Set 5	Total	Report
13 Nov	15:00	Turkey	3–0	Azerbaijan	25–14	25–10	25–18			75–42	Report
