= Aslı Tecimer =

Turkish volleyball player

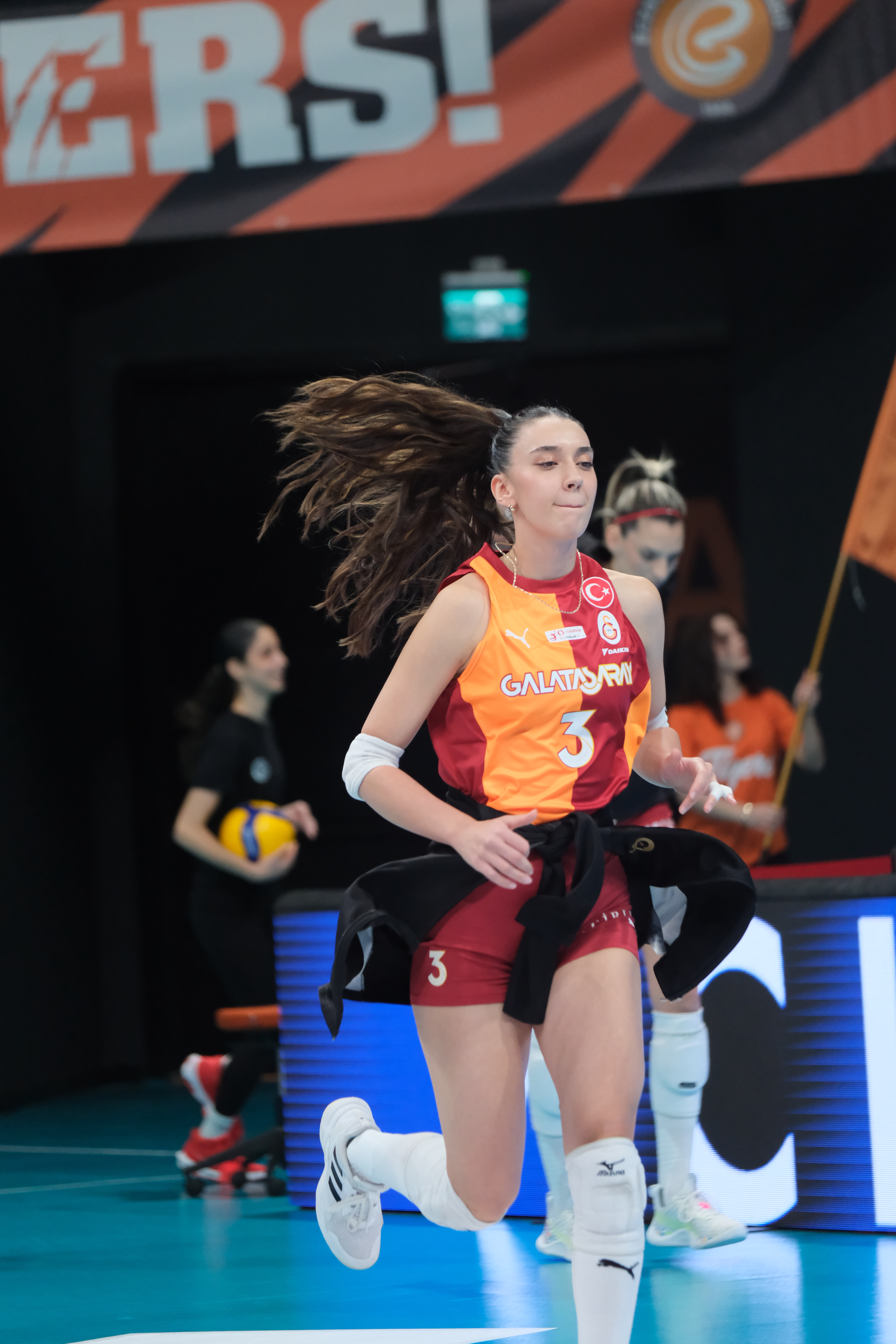

Personal information
- Born: May 12, 2000 (age 26); Turkey
- Height: 1.80 m (5 ft 11 in)
- Weight: 64 kg (141 lb)
- Spike: 290 cm (110 in)
- Block: 290 cm (110 in)

Volleyball information
- Position: Outside Hitter
- Current club: Bahçelievler Belediyespor

Career
Years
- 2017–2018
- 2018–2022
- 2021–2022
- 2022–2024
- 2024–2025
- 2025–2026
- 2026–
Teams
- Bursa Büyükşehir Belediyespor
- Nilüfer Belediyespor
- Adam Voleybol
- Sarıyer Belediyesi
- İBB Spor Kulübü
- Galatasaray
- Bahçelievler Belediyespor

National team
Turkey
Honours
Women's volleyball
Representing Turkey
Islamic Solidarity Games
Gold medal – first place	2025 Rıyadh	Team

Aslı Tecimer (born May 12, 2000) is a Turkish professional volleyball player who plays as an Outside Hitter for Bahçelievler Belediyespor.

== Club career ==
On July 2, 2025, she signed with Galatasaray of the Turkish Sultanlar Ligi.

== International career ==
Tecimer was part of the Turkey team, which became champion at the 2025 Islamic Solidarity Games in Riyadh, Saudi Arabia.

== Honours ==
Turkey
(gold) 2025 Islamic Solidarity Games

Galatasaray
(gold) 2025–26 CEV Cup
