= Volleyball at the 2005 Islamic Solidarity Games =

Volleyball competition

- Dates: 9 – 19 April 2005

Volleyball at the 2005 Islamic Solidarity Games was held in Jeddah from April 9 to April 19, 2005.

== Medalists ==
Event	Gold	Silver	Bronze
Men	Iran; Peyman Akbari; Mohammad Torkashvand; Farhad Zarif; Ramin Babaei; Amir Hosseini; Mohammad Shariati; Mohammad Mansouri; Alireza Nadi; Mehran Zare; Amir Hossein Monazzami; Behnam Mahmoudi; Mehdi Bazargard	Egypt	Algeria

== Results ==
=== Preliminary round ===
==== Group A ====
Team	Pts	W	L	SW	SL	Ratio
Egypt	6	3	0	9	0	MAX
Azerbaijan	5	2	1	6	3	2.000
Yemen	4	1	2	3	6	0.500
Tajikistan	3	0	3	0	9	0.000

Date		Score		Set 1	Set 2	Set 3	Set 4	Set 5	Total
April 9	Azerbaijan	0–3	Egypt	20–25	22–25	23–25			
April 9	Tajikistan	0–3	Yemen	13–25	21–25	21–25			
April 11	Yemen	0–3	Azerbaijan						
April 11	Tajikistan	0–3	Egypt						
April 13	Azerbaijan	3–0	Tajikistan	25–15	25–16	25–10			
April 13	Egypt	3–0	Yemen	25–12	25–18	25–16			

==== Group B ====
Team	Pts	W	L	SW	SL	Ratio
Iran	6	3	0	9	1	9.000
Pakistan	5	2	1	7	4	1.750
Iraq	4	1	2	4	6	0.667
Palestine	3	0	3	0	9	0.000

Date		Score		Set 1	Set 2	Set 3	Set 4	Set 5	Total
April 10	Iraq	1–3	Pakistan	25–21	19–25	13–25	16–25		
April 10	Palestine	0–3	Iran	8–25	16–25	14–25			
April 12	Iran	3–1	Pakistan	25–23	23–25	25–21	25–22		
April 12	Iraq	3–0	Palestine						
April 13	Pakistan	3–0	Palestine	25–13	25–14	25–15			
April 13	Iran	3–0	Iraq	25–12	25–21	25–12			

==== Group C ====
Team	Pts	W	L	SW	SL	Ratio
Morocco	4	2	0	6	0	MAX
Turkmenistan	3	1	1	3	3	1.000
Chad	2	0	2	0	6	0.000

Date		Score		Set 1	Set 2	Set 3	Set 4	Set 5	Total
April 9	Chad	0–3	Turkmenistan	16–25	13–25	10–25			
April 11	Morocco	3–0	Turkmenistan	25–16	27–25	25–20			
April 13	Chad	0–3	Morocco	16–25	12–25	7–25			

==== Group D ====
Team	Pts	W	L	SW	SL	Ratio
Saudi Arabia	8	4	0	12	2	6.000
Algeria	7	3	1	11	3	3.667
Jordan	5	1	3	5	11	0.455
Syria	5	1	3	5	11	0.455
Sudan	5	1	3	5	11	0.455

Date		Score		Set 1	Set 2	Set 3	Set 4	Set 5	Total
April 9	Jordan	0–3	Algeria	16–25	20–25	24–26			
April 9	Saudi Arabia	3–0	Syria	25–16	25–19	25–23			
April 10	Syria	2–3	Jordan	28–26	20–25	26–24	32–34	11–15	
April 10	Sudan	0–3	Saudi Arabia	14–25	23–25	18–25			
April 11	Jordan	2–3	Sudan	19–25	25–15	25–23	15–25	12–15	
April 11	Algeria	3–0	Syria	25–18	25–8	25–17			
April 12	Sudan	0–3	Algeria	13–25	14–25	23–25			
April 12	Saudi Arabia	3–0	Jordan	25–18	25–13	25–18			
April 13	Syria	3–2	Sudan	25–22	25–20	20–25	25–27	15–7	
April 13	Algeria	2–3	Saudi Arabia	17–25	23–25	25–22	25–23	5–15	

=== Second round ===
==== Group E ====
Team	Pts	W	L	SW	SL	Ratio
Iran	6	3	0	9	0	MAX
Saudi Arabia	5	2	1	6	3	2.000
Azerbaijan	4	1	2	3	6	0.500
Turkmenistan	3	0	3	0	9	0.000

Date		Score		Set 1	Set 2	Set 3	Set 4	Set 5	Total
April 15	Saudi Arabia	3–0	Turkmenistan	25–19	25–19	25–12			
April 15	Iran	3–0	Azerbaijan	25–15	25–16	25–14			
April 16	Iran	3–0	Turkmenistan	25–13	25–15	25–17			
April 16	Saudi Arabia	3–0	Azerbaijan	25–20	25–22	25–19			
April 17	Turkmenistan	0–3	Azerbaijan						
April 17	Saudi Arabia	0–3	Iran	15–25	9–25	25–27			

==== Group F ====
Team	Pts	W	L	SW	SL	Ratio
Egypt	6	3	0	9	1	9.000
Algeria	5	2	1	6	5	1.200
Pakistan	4	1	2	5	7	0.714
Morocco	3	0	3	2	9	0.222

Date		Score		Set 1	Set 2	Set 3	Set 4	Set 5	Total
April 15	Pakistan	3–1	Morocco	25–22	22–25	25–17	25–16		
April 15	Algeria	0–3	Egypt	15–25	23–25	22–25			
April 16	Egypt	3–1	Pakistan	25–23	18–25	25–15	25–23		
April 16	Algeria	3–1	Morocco	20–25	25–18	25–18	38–36		
April 17	Pakistan	1–3	Algeria	22–25	35–37	25–21	22–25		
April 17	Egypt	3–0	Morocco	25–12	25–14	25–16			

=== Classification ===
7th place match

Date		Score		Set 1	Set 2	Set 3	Set 4	Set 5	Total
April 18	Turkmenistan	1–3	Morocco						

5th place match

Date		Score		Set 1	Set 2	Set 3	Set 4	Set 5	Total
April 18	Azerbaijan	3–0	Pakistan						

=== Final round ===
Semi-finals
18 April
Iran	3
Algeria	0
18 April
Egypt	3
Saudi Arabia	2

Final
19 April
Iran	3
Egypt	2
Bronze-final
19 April
Algeria	3
Saudi Arabia	0

Date		Score		Set 1	Set 2	Set 3	Set 4	Set 5	Total
18 Apr	Iran	3–0	Algeria	25–18	25–21	25–19			
18 Apr	Egypt	3–2	Saudi Arabia	18–25	25–22	25–18	21–25	17–15	

Date		Score		Set 1	Set 2	Set 3	Set 4	Set 5	Total
19 Apr	Algeria	3–0	Saudi Arabia	25–19	25–22	25–23			
19 Apr	Iran	3–2	Egypt	25–23	14–25	25–17	26–28	15–10	
