= Eisa Nasseri =

Iranian volleyball player (born 2001)

Seyed Eisa Naseri

Personal information
- Full name: Seyed Eisa Naseri Chenari
- Nationality: Iranian
- Born: 18 February 2001 (age 25); Babol, Iran
- Height: 2.03 m (6 ft 8 in)
- Weight: 93 kg (205 lb)
- Spike: 360 cm (142 in)
- Block: 348 cm (137 in)

Volleyball information
- Position: Middle blocker
- Current club: Paykan Tehran
- Number: 66

Career
| Years | Teams |
|---|---|
| 2018–2021; 2021–2022; 2022–2024; 2024–2025; 2025– | (Iran) Saipa Tehran (Iran) Hoorsun Ramsar (Iran) Mes Rafsanjan (Iran) Mehregan Noor (Iran) Paykan Tehran |

National team
| 2025– | Iran |
Honours
Men's volleyball
Representing Iran
Solidarity Games
| Gold medal – first place | 2025 | Team |
Asian Men's Volleyball Championship
| Silver medal – second place | JPN 2026 | Team |
Asian Games
| Gold medal – first place | Nagoya 2026 | Team |

Seyed Eisa Nasseri Chenari (Persian: سید عیسی ناصری چناری, born February 18, 2001, in Babol) is an Iranian volleyball player who plays as a Middle blocker for the Iranian national team and Iranian club Paykan Tehran.
