= Rida Erlalelitepe =

Turkish volleyball player (born 1996)

Personal information
- Born: 22 July 1996 (age 30); İzmir, Turkey
- Height: 1.85 m (6 ft 1 in)
- Weight: 70 kg (150 lb)
- Spike: 300 cm (120 in)
- Block: 285 cm (112 in)

Volleyball information
- Position: Outside Hitter
- Current club: Çanakkale Bld. SK

Career
Years
- 2007–2011
- 2011–2013
- 2013–2014
- 2014–2015
- 2015–2016
- 2016–2017
- 2017–2018
- 2018–2019
- 2019–2020
- 2019–2020
- 2020–2022
- 2022–2023
- 2023–
Teams
- Arkas Spor
- TVF Sports High School
- Eczacıbaşı VitrA
- →Sarıyer Bld.
- →Yeşilyurt
- →Sarıyer Bld.
- →Seramiksan
- Beşiktaş JK
- →IlBank
- →Nevşehir Bld.
- Beşiktaş JK
- Edremit Bld. Altınoluk
- Çanakkale Bld.

National team
- 2011
- 2013
- 2014
- 2015
- 2017
- Turkey U-15
- Turkey U-17
- Turkey U-19
- Turkey U-20
- Turkey
Honours
Women's Volleyball
Representing Turkey
Islamic Solidarity Games
Silver medal – second place	2017 Baku	Team

Rida Erlalelitepe (born 22 July 1996) is a Turkish volleyball player. She is 1.85 m (6 ft 1 in) tall at 70 kg (150 lb), and plays in the Outside Hitterr position for Çanakkale Bld. SK. She was a member of the Turkey national team.

== Club career ==
Erlalelitepe is 1.85 m (6 ft 1 in) tall at 70 kg (150 lb), and plays in the Outside Hitter position. She has a spike height of 300 cm (120 in) and a block height of 285 cm (112 in).

She started her sport career at the age of ten in the academy of Arkas Spor in her hometown İzmir. One year later, she was admiited to the team of her age group. She played four seasons in the farm teams of Arkas Spor. During her secondary education years in Ankara, she played for the school team of the TVF Sports High School of the Turkish Volleyball Federation (TVF) in the 2012–13 and 2013–14 Turkish Youth Girls' Volleyball League.

Believed in her talent, Eczacıbaşı VitrA took her on the juniors team in August 2013, and brought her from Ankara to Istanbul. In the 2014–15 Turkish League season, she was loaned out to Sarıyer Bld. SK in Istanbul. In the next season, she was with Yeşilyurt on loan basis. After one season, she was loaned out again to Saryer Bld. in the 2016–17 season. Being a member tof Eczacıbaşı VitrA, she was loaned out to Seramiksan SK in Turgutlu, Manisa to play in the 2017–18 season. After one season, she returned to Istanbul, and joined Beşiktaş JK in the 2018–19. In the 2019–20 season, she was with İlBank in Ankara on loan. Later in that season, she was loaned out to Nevşehir Bld. In July 2020, she transferred to Beşiktaş JK for the 2020–21 season. Following a match on 21 November 2020, she was diagnosed with vastus lateralis grade 2 strain and vastus medialis (teardrop muscle) grade 1 strain in her right thigh quadriceps muscle group. She had to stay away from the court for a period of 4–5 weeks. She played for her former club Beşiktaş JK in the 2020–21 and 2021–22 seasons. In the 2022–23 season, she transferred to Edremit Bld. Altınoluk in Edremit, Balıkesir. In June 2023, she signed a deal with Çanakkale Bld. SK for the 2023–24 season.

== International career ==
Erlalelitepe was admitted to the Turkey girls' national U-15 team, and played at the 2011 Blakan Girls' U15 Volleyball Championship in Albania, where her team placed fourth.

With the Turkey U-17 team, she won the bronze medal at the 2012 International Christmas Tournament in Brussels, Belgium, and the gold medal at the 2012 Balkan Women's U-18 Volleyball Championship in Montenegro, as well as another gold medal at the 2013 International Christmas Volleyball Tournament, and was named the Best Outside Spiker of the tournament. She took the gold medal at the 2013 Balkan Youth Girls' Volleyball Championship in Tekirdağ, Turkey. She won another bronze medal at the 2013 Girls' Youth European Volleyball Championship.

With the Turkey U-19 team, she took the bronze medal at the 2014 Women's Junior European Volleyball Championship.

She was part of the Turkey U-20 team, which placed tenth at the 2015 FIVB Volleyball Women's U20 World Championship in Puerto Rico.

As part of the Turkey national team, she won the silver medal at the 2017 Islamic Solidarity Games in Baku, Azerbaijan.

== Personal life ==
Rida Erlalelitepe was born in İzmir, Turkey on 22 July 1996. She was schooled in Agah Efenedi Primary School in İzmir, where she studied six years. The next two years, she was at Private Bornova Primary School on a volleyball scholarship. In the frame of the Turkish Volleyball federation's project to build up a national youth girls' team, she went to Ankara, and studied two years at Doğa Kolej on scholarshi. After she was transferred by the Istanbul-based club Eczacıbaşı VitrA, she continued her secondary education at Sarıyer Doğa Kolej.

== Honours ==
Turkey U-17
Girls' Youth European Volleyball Championship

(bronze) 2013

Turkey U-19
Women's Junior European Volleyball Championship

(bronze) 2014

Turkey
Islamic Solidarity Games

(silver) 2017
