= Mohammad Mousavi =

Mohammad Mousavi may refer to:

- Mohammad Mousavi (volleyball) (born 1987), Iranian volleyball player
- Mohammad Mofti al-shia Mousavi (1928–2010), Iranian Twelver Shi'a Marja
- Mohammad Vaez Mousavi (born 1964), Iranian Shiite cleric and politician
