= Iran men's national volleyball team =

National Iran Volleyball team

Iran
- Nickname(s): Shiran Iranian; Iranian Leopards; Tall of Iran the giants
- Association: IRIVF
- Confederation: AVC
- Head coach: Vacant
- FIVB ranking: 19 (15 October 2026)

Uniforms
| Home | Away | Third |

Summer Olympics
- Appearances: 2 (First in 2016)
- Best result: 5th (2016)

World Championship
- Appearances: 9 (First in 1970)
- Best result: 6th (2014)

World Cup
- Appearances: 4 (First in 1991)
- Best result: 8th (2015, 2019)

Asian Championship
- Appearances: 21 (First in 1979)
- Best result: (gold) (2011, 2013, 2019, 2021)
- volleyball.ir
Honours
| Event | 1st | 2nd | 3rd |
|---|---|---|---|
| FIVB World Grand Champions Cup | 0 | 0 | 1 |
| AVC Continental Championship | 4 | 4 | 1 |
| Asian Games | 4 | 3 | 1 |
| AVC Cup (2008–2022) | 3 | 2 | 0 |
| Other official tournaments | 8 | 3 | 0 |
| Total | 19 | 12 | 3 |
Men's volleyball
FIVB World Grand Champions Cup
| Bronze medal – third place | 2017 Japan | Team |
AVC Continental Championship
| Gold medal – first place | 2011 Tehran | Team |
| Gold medal – first place | 2013 Dubai | Team |
| Gold medal – first place | 2019 Tehran | Team |
| Gold medal – first place | 2021 Chiba–Funabashi | Team |
| Silver medal – second place | 2009 Manila | Team |
| Silver medal – second place | 2015 Tehran | Team |
| Silver medal – second place | 2023 Urmia | Team |
| Silver medal – second place | 2026 Kitakyushu | Team |
| Bronze medal – third place | 2003 Tianjin | Team |
Asian Games
| Gold medal – first place | 2014 Incheon | Team |
| Gold medal – first place | 2018 Jakarta–Palembang | Team |
| Gold medal – first place | 2022 Hangzhou | Team |
| Gold medal – first place | 2026 Aichi–Nagoya | Team |
| Silver medal – second place | 1958 Tokyo | Team |
| Silver medal – second place | 2002 Busan | Team |
| Silver medal – second place | 2010 Guangzhou | Team |
| Bronze medal – third place | 1966 Bangkok | Team |
AVC Cup (2008–2022)
| Gold medal – first place | 2008 Nakhon Ratchasima | Team |
| Gold medal – first place | 2010 Urmia | Team |
| Gold medal – first place | 2016 Nakhon Pathom | Team |
| Silver medal – second place | 2012 Vinh Yen | Team |
| Silver medal – second place | 2018 Taipei | Team |
Islamic Solidarity Games
| Gold medal – first place | 2005 Mecca–Medina–Jeddah–Ta’if | Team |
| Gold medal – first place | 2013 Palembang | Team |
| Gold medal – first place | 2017 Baku | Team |
| Gold medal – first place | 2021 Konya | Team |
| Gold medal – first place | 2025 Riyadh | Team |
West Asian Games
| Silver medal – second place | 2005 Doha | Team |
Asian Central Zone Championship
| Gold medal – first place | 2010 Kolkata | Team |
| Silver medal – second place | 2007 Islamabad | Team |
CAVA Championship
| Gold medal – first place | 2023 Cholpon-Ata | Team |
| Gold medal – first place | 2025 Fergana | Team |
| Silver medal – second place | 2022 Lahore | Team |

The Iran men's national volleyball team (Persian: تیم ملی والیبال مردان ایران), represents Iran in international tournaments and friendly matches under the administration of the Iran Volleyball Federation (IRIVF). The Iranian national volleyball team is one of the best teams in the world. The team has reached as high as sixth place in the FIVB Senior World Rankings. Notable achievements include finishing second in the group stage of the 2019 FIVB Men's Volleyball Nations League and winning the bronze medal at the 2017 FIVB Volleyball Men's World Grand Champions Cup.

In 2017, Iran secured third place in a global competition at the senior level, winning the bronze medal at the 2017 FIVB World Grand Champions Cup.

Ranked among the most powerful teams in the world and Asia, the Iranian national volleyball team has won the Asian Championship four times—in 2011, 2013, 2019, and 2021. Representing Iran at the Asian Games, the team secured the gold medal on four occasions: at the 2014 Incheon, 2018 Jakarta-Palembang, 2022 Hangzhou and 2026 Hangzhou Games . Additionally, the Iranian national volleyball team has won the Asian Volleyball Confederation (AVC) Cup three times and finished as runners-up twice.

Iran is widely considered as a premier volleyball team in the world at the youth level. Iranian teams have won several world championships at the U-13, U-17, U-19, and U-23 levels, and the national team has earned a reputation as one of the top nations for youth volleyball.

Other honors for Iranian volleyball include five titles at the Solidarity Games (won in 2005, 2013, 2017, 2021, and 2025), as well as three championships and two runner-up finishes in the Central Asian competitions and a silver medal at the West Asian Games. Iranian volleyball's achievements also include finishing second in the group stage and fifth overall in the 2019 Volleyball Nations League, a fourth-place finish in the World League, and a sixth-place finish at the World Championship.

As of 11 September 2022, Team Melli is considered as the First team in Asia, as it ranks 7th in the FIVB World Rankings.The national team won the Asian Volleyball Championship four times : in 2011 Tehran, 2013 Dubai, 2019 Tehran and 2021 Chiba & FunabashiIn its appearance in the competition since joining the 2013 World League, Iran has been a dominant force in Group 1. Iran has also competed in the World Championship four times, with their best result obtained in 2014 Poland where they ended up in 6th place. In those games Iran qualified from the first and second rounds with, respectively, four and five wins; their only defeat was against France.

Iran defeated Japan meIn 2014 World League campaign, Iran's national team reached fourth place in Group 1 after a straight-set defeat to their Italian hosts in the bronze medal match. In these games, Iran had already defeated Brazil, Italy and Poland.Japan to win the gold medal at the Asian Games Korea in 2014. Consecutively, in the 2018 Asian Games in Indonesia, Iran cruised past Japan and South Korea to win the gold medal. Iran made it to the Olympic Games for the first time in their history in 2016 as the top-ranked Asian squad at the World Olympic Qualification Tournament in Japan. Iran finished in 5th place in the competition.

== History ==
The history of Iran's national volleyball team dates back to around 1920 when Mir-Mehdi Varzandeh brought volleyball regulations to Iran. At that time a friendly match was arranged between the Iranian and Russian Army teams. In 1958, for the first time, national men's team of Pakistan was invited to Tehran for some friendly matches with the national team, club teams and the Army team. Iran's national team first attended an international competition at the 1958 Asian Games, where they won the silver medal.

== Tournament records ==
=== Olympic Games ===
| Olympic Games record | | | | | | | | | Qualification record | | | | |
| Year | Round | Position | GP | MW | ML | SW | SL | Squad | GP | MW | ML | SW | SL |
|---|---|---|---|---|---|---|---|---|---|---|---|---|---|
| (Japan) 1964 | Did not participate or Did not qualify | | | | | | | | 6 | 2 | 4 | 10 | 12 |
| (Mexico) 1968 | Did not participate or Did not qualify | | | | | | | | Did not participate or Did not qualify | | | | |
| (West Germany) 1972 | Did not participate or Did not qualify | | | | | | | | Did not participate or Did not qualify | | | | |
| (Canada) 1976 | Did not participate or Did not qualify | | | | | | | | Did not participate or Did not qualify | | | | |
| (Soviet Union) 1980 | Did not participate or Did not qualify | | | | | | | | Did not participate or Did not qualify | | | | |
| (United States) 1984 | Did not participate or Did not qualify | | | | | | | | Did not participate or Did not qualify | | | | |
| (South Korea) 1988 | Did not participate or Did not qualify | | | | | | | | Did not participate or Did not qualify | | | | |
| (Spain) 1992 | Did not participate or Did not qualify | | | | | | | | Did not participate or Did not qualify | | | | |
| (United States) 1996 | Did not participate or Did not qualify | | | | | | | | Did not participate or Did not qualify | | | | |
| (Australia) 2000 | Did not participate or Did not qualify | | | | | | | | Did not participate or Did not qualify | | | | |
| (Greece) 2004 | Did not participate or Did not qualify | | | | | | | | 7 | 4 | 3 | 13 | 11 |
| (China) 2008 | Did not participate or Did not qualify | | | | | | | | 7 | 2 | 5 | 11 | 16 |
| (United Kingdom) 2012 | Did not participate or Did not qualify | | | | | | | | 7 | 5 | 2 | 16 | 9 |
| (Brazil) 2016 | Quarterfinals | 5th place | 6 | 2 | 4 | 8 | 12 | Squad | 7 | 6 | 1 | 18 | 11 |
| (Japan) 2020 | Preliminary round | 9th place | 5 | 2 | 3 | 9 | 11 | Squad | 8 | 7 | 1 | 21 | 7 |
| (France) 2024 | Did not qualify | | | | | | | | 7 | 1 | 6 | 7 | 19 |
| (United States) 2028 | Future event | | | | | | | | Via AVC Championship, FIVB World Cup and FIVB World Rankings | | | | |
| (Australia) 2032 | Future event | | | | | | | | Via AVC Championship, FIVB World Cup and FIVB World Rankings | | | | |
| Total | 2/16 | | 11 | 4 | 7 | 17 | 23 | — | 49 | 27 | 22 | 96 | 85 |

=== FIVB World Cup ===
| FIVB World Cup record | | | | | | | | | Qualification record | | | | |
| Year | Round | Position | GP | MW | ML | SW | SL | Squad | GP | MW | ML | SW | SL |
|---|---|---|---|---|---|---|---|---|---|---|---|---|---|
| (Czechoslovakia) 1949 | Did not participate | | | | | | | | Did not participate | | | | |
| (Soviet Union) 1952 | Did not participate | | | | | | | | Did not participate | | | | |
| (France) 1956 | Did not participate | | | | | | | | Did not participate | | | | |
| (Brazil) 1960 | Did not participate | | | | | | | | Did not participate | | | | |
| (Soviet Union) 1962 | Did not participate | | | | | | | | Did not participate | | | | |
| (Czechoslovakia) 1966 | Did not participate | | | | | | | | Did not participate | | | | |
| (Bulgaria) 1970 | 17th–24th places | 21st place | 11 | 4 | 7 | 16 | 24 | Squad | Via Asian Games | | | | |
| (Mexico) 1974 | Did not participate | | | | | | | | Did not participate | | | | |
| (Italy) 1978 | Did not participate | | | | | | | | Did not participate | | | | |
| (Argentina) 1982 | Did not qualify | | | | | | | | Via AVC Championship | | | | |
| (France) 1986 | Did not participate | | | | | | | | Did not participate | | | | |
| (Brazil) 1990 | Did not qualify | | | | | | | | Via AVC Championship | | | | |
| (Greece) 1994 | Did not qualify | | | | | | | | 4 | 1 | 3 | 3 | 9 |
| (Japan) 1998 | First round | 19th place | 3 | 0 | 3 | 0 | 9 | Squad | 2 | 1 | 1 | 3 | 4 |
| (Argentina) 2002 | Did not participate | | | | | | | | Did not participate | | | | |
| (Japan) 2006 | First round | 21st place | 5 | 0 | 5 | 2 | 15 | Squad | 3 | 3 | 0 | 9 | 0 |
| (Italy) 2010 | First round | 19th place | 3 | 1 | 2 | 5 | 7 | Squad | 6 | 5 | 1 | 16 | 7 |
| (Poland) 2014 | 5th place match | 6th place | 12 | 7 | 5 | 26 | 21 | Squad | 3 | 3 | 0 | 9 | 0 |
| (Italy) (Bulgaria) 2018 | Second round | 13th place | 8 | 4 | 4 | 14 | 16 | Squad | 4 | 4 | 0 | 12 | 0 |
| (Poland) (Slovenia) 2022 | Round of 16 | 13th place | 4 | 2 | 2 | 7 | 9 | Squad | Via AVC Championship and FIVB World Rankings | | | | |
| (Philippines) 2025 | Quarterfinals | 8th place | 5 | 3 | 2 | 11 | 11 | Squad | Via AVC Championship and FIVB World Rankings | | | | |
| (Poland) 2027 | Qualified | | | | | | | | Via AVC Championship and FIVB World Rankings | | | | |
| (Qatar) 2029 | Future event | | | | | | | | Via AVC Championship and FIVB World Rankings | | | | |
| Total | 8/21 | | 51 | 21 | 30 | 81 | 112 | — | 22 | 17 | 5 | 52 | 20 |

=== FIVB World Cup (1965–2019) ===
FIVB World Cup (1965–2019) record (Defunct)
| Year | Round | Position | GP | MW | ML | SW | SL | Squad |
|---|---|---|---|---|---|---|---|---|
| (Poland) 1965 | Did not participate | | | | | | | |
| (East Germany) 1969 | Did not participate | | | | | | | |
| (Japan) 1977 | Did not participate | | | | | | | |
| (Japan) 1981 | Did not participate | | | | | | | |
| (Japan) 1985 | Did not participate | | | | | | | |
| (Japan) 1989 | Did not qualify | | | | | | | |
| (Japan) 1991 | 7th–12th places | 11th place | 8 | 1 | 7 | 5 | 23 | Squad |
| (Japan) 1995 | Did not qualify | | | | | | | |
| (Japan) 1999 | Did not qualify | | | | | | | |
| (Japan) 2003 | Did not qualify | | | | | | | |
| (Japan) 2007 | Did not qualify | | | | | | | |
| (Japan) 2011 | Round-robin | 9th place | 11 | 5 | 6 | 16 | 25 | Squad |
| (Japan) 2015 | Round-robin | 8th place | 11 | 4 | 7 | 16 | 24 | Squad |
| (Japan) 2019 | Round-robin | 8th place | 11 | 4 | 7 | 19 | 25 | Squad |
| Total | 4/14 | | 41 | 14 | 27 | 56 | 97 | — |

=== FIVB World Grand Champions Cup ===
Third place Fourth place

FIVB World Grand Champions record (Defunct)
| Year | Round | Position | GP | MW | ML | SW | SL | Squad |
|---|---|---|---|---|---|---|---|---|
| (Japan) 1993 | Did not qualify | | | | | | | |
| (Japan) 1997 | Did not qualify | | | | | | | |
| (Japan) 2001 | Did not qualify | | | | | | | |
| (Japan) 2005 | Did not qualify | | | | | | | |
| (Japan) 2009 | Round-robin | 5th place | 5 | 1 | 4 | 8 | 14 | Squad |
| (Japan) 2013 | Round-robin | 4th place | 5 | 3 | 2 | 10 | 10 | Squad |
| (Japan) 2017 | Round-robin | 3rd place | 5 | 4 | 1 | 12 | 10 | Squad |
| Total | 3/7 | | 15 | 8 | 7 | 30 | 34 | — |

=== FIVB World League ===
Fourth place

| FIVB World League record (Defunct) | | | | | | | | | Qualification record | | | | |
| Year | Round | Position | GP | MW | ML | SW | SL | Squad | GP | MW | ML | SW | SL |
|---|---|---|---|---|---|---|---|---|---|---|---|---|---|
| (Japan) 1990 | Did not participate | | | | | | | | Did not participate | | | | |
| (Italy) 1991 | Did not participate | | | | | | | | Did not participate | | | | |
| (Italy) 1992 | Did not participate | | | | | | | | Did not participate | | | | |
| (Brazil) 1993 | Did not participate | | | | | | | | Did not participate | | | | |
| (Italy) 1994 | Did not participate | | | | | | | | Did not participate | | | | |
| (Brazil) 1995 | Did not participate | | | | | | | | Did not participate | | | | |
| (Netherlands) 1996 | Did not participate | | | | | | | | Did not participate | | | | |
| (Russia) 1997 | Did not participate | | | | | | | | Did not participate | | | | |
| (Italy) 1998 | Did not participate | | | | | | | | Did not participate | | | | |
| (Argentina) 1999 | Did not participate | | | | | | | | Did not participate | | | | |
| (Netherlands) 2000 | Did not participate | | | | | | | | Did not participate | | | | |
| (Poland) 2001 | Did not participate | | | | | | | | Did not participate | | | | |
| (Brazil) 2002 | Did not participate | | | | | | | | Did not participate | | | | |
| (Spain) 2003 | Did not participate | | | | | | | | Did not participate | | | | |
| (Italy) 2004 | Did not participate | | | | | | | | Did not participate | | | | |
| (Serbia and Montenegro) 2005 | Did not participate | | | | | | | | Did not participate | | | | |
| (Russia) 2006 | Did not participate | | | | | | | | Did not participate | | | | |
| (Poland) 2007 | Did not participate | | | | | | | | Did not participate | | | | |
| (Brazil) 2008 | Did not participate | | | | | | | | Did not participate | | | | |
| (Serbia) 2009 | Did not participate | | | | | | | | Did not participate | | | | |
| (Argentina) 2010 | Did not qualify | | | | | | | | 2 | 0 | 2 | 0 | 6 |
| (Poland) 2011 | Did not qualify | | | | | | | | Via FIVB World Rankings | | | | |
| (Bulgaria) 2012 | Did not qualify | | | | | | | | 1 | 0 | 1 | 1 | 3 |
| (Argentina) 2013 | Intercontinental round | 9th place | 10 | 5 | 5 | 20 | 21 | Squad | 4 | 4 | 0 | 12 | 1 |
| (Italy) 2014 | 3rd place match | 4th place | 16 | 7 | 9 | 28 | 32 | Squad | Directly qualified | | | | |
| (Brazil) 2015 | Intercontinental round | 7th place | 12 | 6 | 6 | 25 | 21 | Squad | Directly qualified | | | | |
| (Poland) 2016 | Intercontinental round | 8th place | 9 | 4 | 5 | 15 | 22 | Squad | Directly qualified | | | | |
| (Brazil) 2017 | Intercontinental round | 11th place | 9 | 3 | 6 | 11 | 23 | Squad | Directly qualified | | | | |
| Total | 5/28 | | 56 | 25 | 31 | 99 | 119 | 56 | 7 | 4 | 3 | 13 | 10 |

=== FIVB Nations League ===
FIVB Nations League record
| Year | Round | Position | GP | MW | ML | SW | SL | Squad |
|---|---|---|---|---|---|---|---|---|
| (France) 2018 | Preliminary round | 10th place | 15 | 7 | 8 | 29 | 30 | Squad |
| (United States) 2019 | Final round pool play | 5th place | 17 | 12 | 5 | 41 | 21 | Squad |
| (Italy) 2021 | Preliminary round | 12th place | 15 | 5 | 10 | 25 | 32 | Squad |
| (Italy) 2022 | Quarterfinals | 7th place | 13 | 7 | 6 | 24 | 22 | Squad |
| (Poland) 2023 | Preliminary round | 14th place | 12 | 2 | 10 | 16 | 31 | Squad |
| (Poland) 2024 | Preliminary round | 15th place | 12 | 2 | 10 | 14 | 34 | Squad |
| (China) 2025 | Preliminary round | 9th place | 12 | 6 | 6 | 25 | 24 | Squad |
| (China) 2026 | Preliminary round | 15th place | 12 | 3 | 9 | 18 | 30 | Squad |
| (N/A) 2027 | Qualified | | | | | | | |
| Total | 0 Titles | 9/9 | 108 | 44 | 64 | 192 | 224 | — |

=== AVC Continental Championship ===
Champions Runners up Third place Fourth place

AVC Continental Championship record
| Year | Round | Position | GP | MW | ML | SW | SL | Squad |
|---|---|---|---|---|---|---|---|---|
| (Australia) 1975 | Did not participate | | | | | | | |
| (Bahrain) 1979 | Classification 5th–8th | 6th place | 6 | 3 | 3 | 12 | 10 | Squad |
| (Japan) 1983 | Did not participate | | | | | | | |
| (Kuwait) 1987 | 9th place match | 10th place | 7 | 4 | 3 | 13 | 12 | Squad |
| (South Korea) 1989 | 7th place match | 8th place | 8 | 3 | 5 | 11 | 15 | Squad |
| (Australia) 1991 | 7th place match | 7th place | 7 | 3 | 4 | 11 | 14 | Squad |
| (Thailand) 1993 | 5th place match | 5th place | 7 | 4 | 3 | 12 | 11 | Squad |
| (South Korea) 1995 | Championship | 4th place | 7 | 4 | 3 | 12 | 13 | Squad |
| (Qatar) 1997 | Classification 5th–8th | 6th place | 5 | 2 | 3 | 8 | 11 | Squad |
| (Iran) 1999 | Classification 5th–8th | 5th place | 6 | 4 | 2 | 13 | 10 | Squad |
| (South Korea) 2001 | 5th place match | 5th place | 6 | 4 | 2 | 14 | 10 | Squad |
| (China) 2003 | Championship | 3rd place | 7 | 5 | 2 | 16 | 12 | Squad |
| (Thailand) 2005 | 5th place match | 6th place | 5 | 3 | 2 | 12 | 10 | Squad |
| (Indonesia) 2007 | Championship | 5th place | 9 | 5 | 4 | 17 | 18 | Squad |
| (Philippines) 2009 | Final | Runners-up | 8 | 7 | 1 | 22 | 10 | Squad |
| (Iran) 2011 | Final | Champions | 8 | 8 | 0 | 24 | 2 | Squad |
| (United Arab Emirates) 2013 | Final | Champions | 7 | 7 | 0 | 21 | 1 | Squad |
| (Iran) 2015 | Final | Runners-up | 8 | 6 | 2 | 20 | 9 | Squad (Note: Iran played with their "B" team.) |
| (Indonesia) 2017 | 5th place match | 5th place | 8 | 6 | 2 | 20 | 10 | Squad (Note: Iran played with their "U23" team.) |
| (Iran) 2019 | Final | Champions | 8 | 7 | 1 | 22 | 4 | Squad |
| (Japan) 2021 | Final | Champions | 7 | 7 | 0 | 21 | 1 | Squad |
| (Iran) 2023 | Final | Runners-up | 5 | 4 | 1 | 12 | 4 | Squad |
| (Japan) 2026 | Final | Runners-up | 6 | 5 | 1 | 15 | 6 | Squad |
| Total | 4 Titles | 21/23 | 145 | 101 | 44 | 328 | 193 | — |

=== Asian Games ===
Champions Runners up Third place Fourth place

Asian Games record
| Year | Round | Position | GP | MW | ML | SW | SL | Squad |
|---|---|---|---|---|---|---|---|---|
| (Japan) 1958 | Round-robin | Runners-up | 4 | 3 | 1 | 9 | 6 | Squad |
| (Indonesia) 1962 | Did not participate | | | | | | | |
| (Thailand) 1966 | Final round | 3rd place | 8 | 5 | 3 | 16 | 14 | Squad |
| (Thailand) 1970 | Round-robin | 5th place | 7 | 3 | 4 | 11 | 14 | Squad |
| (Iran) 1974 | 3rd place match | 4th place | 5 | 2 | 3 | 7 | 9 | Squad |
| (Thailand) 1978 | Did not participate | | | | | | | |
| (India) 1982 | Did not participate | | | | | | | |
| (South Korea) 1986 | Did not participate | | | | | | | |
| (China) 1990 | Did not participate | | | | | | | |
| (Japan) 1994 | 5th place match | 5th place | 9 | 5 | 4 | 16 | 16 | Squad |
| (Thailand) 1998 | Did not participate | | | | | | | |
| (South Korea) 2002 | Final | Runners-up | 6 | 4 | 2 | 12 | 10 | Squad |
| (Qatar) 2006 | 5th place match | 6th place | 3 | 1 | 2 | 6 | 7 | Squad |
| (China) 2010 | Final | Runners-up | 9 | 8 | 1 | 25 | 4 | Squad |
| (South Korea) 2014 | Final | Champions | 8 | 8 | 0 | 24 | 2 | Squad |
| (Indonesia) 2018 | Final | Champions | 5 | 5 | 0 | 15 | 0 | Squad |
| (China) 2022 | Final | Champions | 5 | 5 | 0 | 15 | 2 | Squad |
| (Japan) 2026 | Final | Champions | 6 | 6 | 0 | 18 | 5 | Squad |
| (Qatar) 2030 | Future event | | | | | | | |
| (Saudi Arabia) 2034 | Future event | | | | | | | |
| Total | 4 Titles | 12/18 | 75 | 55 | 20 | 174 | 89 | — |

=== AVC Cup (2008–2022) ===
Champions Runners up Fourth place

AVC Cup (2008–2022) record (Defunct)
| Year | Round | Position | GP | MW | ML | SW | SL | Squad |
|---|---|---|---|---|---|---|---|---|
| (Thailand) 2008 | Final | Champions | 6 | 5 | 1 | 16 | 8 | Squad |
| (Iran) 2010 | Final | Champions | 6 | 6 | 0 | 18 | 6 | Squad |
| (Vietnam) 2012 | Final | Runners-up | 6 | 5 | 1 | 16 | 7 | Squad |
| (Kazakhstan) 2014 | 3rd place match | 4th place | 6 | 4 | 2 | 14 | 9 | Squad |
| (Thailand) 2016 | Final | Champions | 6 | 6 | 0 | 18 | 5 | Squad |
| (Taiwan) 2018 | Final | Runners-up | 5 | 4 | 1 | 14 | 5 | Squad |
| (Thailand) 2022 | 5th place match | 5th place | 5 | 3 | 2 | 11 | 8 | Squad (Note: Iran played with their "U21" team.) |
| Total | 3 Titles | 7/7 | 40 | 33 | 7 | 107 | 48 | — |

=== Other tournaments ===
==== Islamic Solidarity Games ====
Champions

Islamic Solidarity Games record
| Year | Round | Position | GP | MW | ML | SW | SL | Squad |
|---|---|---|---|---|---|---|---|---|
| (Saudi Arabia) 2005 | Final | Champions | 8 | 8 | 0 | 24 | 3 | Squad |
| (Indonesia) 2013 | Final | Champions | 6 | 6 | 0 | 18 | 2 | Squad |
| (Azerbaijan) 2017 | Final | Champions | 6 | 6 | 0 | 18 | 3 | Squad |
| (Turkey) 2021 | Final | Champions | 5 | 4 | 1 | 14 | 4 | Squad |
| (Saudi Arabia) 2025 | Final | Champions | 6 | 6 | 0 | 18 | 5 | Squad |
| (Malaysia) 2029 | Future event | | | | | | | |
| Total | 5 Titles | 5/5 | 31 | 30 | 1 | 92 | 17 | — |

==== West Asian Games ====
Runners up

West Asian Games record (Defunct)
| Year | Round | Position | GP | MW | ML | SW | SL | Squad |
|---|---|---|---|---|---|---|---|---|
| (Qatar) 2005 | Round-robin | Runners-up | 5 | 4 | 1 | 14 | 4 | Squad |
| Total | 1/1 | | 5 | 4 | 1 | 14 | 4 | — |

==== CAVA Championship ====
Champions Runners up

CAVA Championship record
| Year | Round | Position | GP | MW | ML | SW | SL | Squad |
|---|---|---|---|---|---|---|---|---|
| (Pakistan) 2022 | Final | Runners-up | 5 | 3 | 2 | 10 | 6 | Squad (Note: Iran played with their "U19" team.) |
| (Kyrgyzstan) 2023 | Round-robin | Champions | 6 | 5 | 1 | 17 | 4 | Squad |
| (Pakistan) 2024 | Preliminary round | 5th place | 5 | 2 | 3 | 7 | 11 | Squad |
| (Uzbekistan) 2025 | Final | Champions | 6 | 6 | 0 | 18 | 3 | Squad |
| (Pakistan) 2026 | Did not participate | | | | | | | |
| Total | 2 Titles | 4/5 | 22 | 16 | 6 | 52 | 24 | — |

== 2026 Results and fixtures ==
| # | Opponent | Result | Host city | Date | Tournaments |
|---|---|---|---|---|---|
| 1 | Brazil | 1–3 (21–25, 25–23, 15–25, 23–25) | (Brazil) Brasília | 10 June | 2026 FIVB Nations League |
| 2 | Bulgaria | 0–3 (23–25, 19–25, 21–25) | (Brazil) Brasília | 11 June | 2026 FIVB Nations League |
| 3 | Argentina | 3–0 (25–23, 25–19, 25–23) | (Brazil) Brasília | 12 June | 2026 FIVB Nations League |
| 4 | Belgium | 2–3 (23–25, 22–25, 25–23, 25–17, 12–15) | (Brazil) Brasília | 14 June | 2026 FIVB Nations League |
| 5 | France | 2–3 (21–25, 25–23, 21–25, 26–24, 15–17) | (France) Orléans | 24 June | 2026 FIVB Nations League |
| 6 | United States | 0–3 (23–25, 20–25, 29–31) | (France) Orléans | 25 June | 2026 FIVB Nations League |
| 7 | Japan | 2–3 (19–25, 19–25, 25–20, 25–23, 12–15) | (France) Orléans | 26 June | 2026 FIVB Nations League |
| 8 | Cuba | 3–1 (25–22, 25–21, 20–25, 30–28) | (France) Orléans | 28 June | 2026 FIVB Nations League |
| 9 | Ukraine | 1–3 (22–25, 21–25, 31–29, 19–25) | (Serbia) Belgrade | 15 July | 2026 FIVB Nations League |
| 10 | Germany | 3–2 (25–22, 26–28, 18–25, 25–20, 15–12) | (Serbia) Belgrade | 16 July | 2026 FIVB Nations League |
| 11 | Slovenia | 0–3 (25–27, 19–25, 24–26) | (Serbia) Belgrade | 17 July | 2026 FIVB Nations League |
| 12 | Turkey | 1–3 (25–17, 22–25, 16–25, 19–25) | (Serbia) Belgrade | 19 July | 2026 FIVB Nations League |
| 13 | New Zealand | 3–0 (25–15, 25–12, 25–22) | (Japan) Kitakyushu | 4 September | 2026 AVC Continental Championship |
| 14 | India | 3–0 (25–20, 28–26, 25–18) | (Japan) Kitakyushu | 6 September | 2026 AVC Continental Championship |
| 15 | China | 3–1 (25–23, 23–25, 25–22, 25–23) | (Japan) Kitakyushu | 9 September | 2026 AVC Continental Championship |
| 16 | Chinese Taipei | 3–1 (25–19, 25–19, 21–25, 25–18) | (Japan) Kitakyushu | 11 September | 2026 AVC Continental Championship |
| 17 | Australia | 3–1 (25–21, 17–25, 25–17, 25–22) | (Japan) Kitakyushu | 12 September | 2026 AVC Continental Championship |
| 18 | Japan | 0–3 (21–25, 24–26, 23–25) | (Japan) Kitakyushu | 13 September | 2026 AVC Continental Championship |
| 19 | Kyrgyzstan | 3–0 (25–11, 25–16, 25–20) | (Japan) Okazaki | 27 September | 2026 Asian Games |
| 20 | Thailand | 3–0 (25–18, 25–18, 25–15) | (Japan) Okazaki | 28 September | 2026 Asian Games |
| 21 | Indonesia | 3–2 (22–25, 21–25, 25–21, 25–19, 17–15) | (Japan) Okazaki | 29 September | 2026 Asian Games |
| 22 | South Korea | 3–2 (25–23, 18–25, 21–25, 25–20, 15–12) | (Japan) Okazaki | 1 October | 2026 Asian Games |
| 23 | Pakistan | 3–0 (25–13, 25–15, 25–11) | (Japan) Okazaki | 2 October | 2026 Asian Games |
| 24 | Japan | 3–1 (28–26, 19–25, 25–21, 26–24) | (Japan) Okazaki | 3 October | 2026 Asian Games |
Head coach: (Italy) Roberto Piazza

== Fans ==
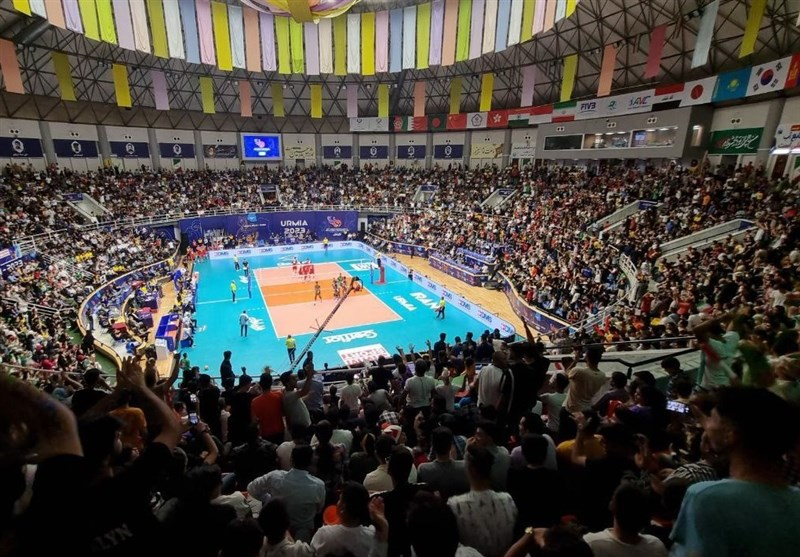
Fans of the Iranian national volleyball team at the stadium 2023

Iranian volleyball has fans across the globe. It is one of the two most popular sports in Iran; stadiums often have attendance far exceeding official capacity. Domestic competitions drew crowds between 1968 and 2010, and the national team's matches—particularly at the Asian and global levels—garner immense public attention.

== Friendly Tournaments ==
- Some of the friendly tournaments in which Iranian volleyball participates.
- Memorial of Hubert Jerzy Wagner
- 2012 Memorial of Hubert Jerzy Wagner
- 2015 Memorial of Hubert Jerzy Wagner
- Slovenia Four-Team Volleyball Tournament

== Honors ==
=== Global ===
- World Grand Champions Cup

(bronze) Bronze: 2017
- Fourth place: 2013

- World League

- Fourth place: 2014

- Olympics

- Fifth place: 2016

=== Continental ===
- Asian Championship

(gold) Champion: 2011, 2013, 2019, 2021
(silver) Runner-up: 2009, 2015, 2023, 2026
(bronze) Third place: 2003

- Asian Games

(gold) Champion: 2014, 2018, 2022 , 2026
(silver) Runner-up: 1958, 2002, 2010
(bronze) Third place: 1966

- Asian Cup

(gold) Champion: 2008, 2010, 2016
(silver) Runner-up: 2012, 2018

- Solidarity Games

(gold) Champion: 2005, 2013, 2017, 2021, 2025

=== Regional ===
(silver) Runner-up: 2005

- Central Asian Volleyball

(gold) Champion: 2010, 2023, 2025
(silver) Runner-up: 2007, 2022

=== Friendly Tournaments ===
- Memorial of Hubert Jerzy Wagner:

(bronze) Third place: 2022
- Fourth place: 2012, 2015

- Kazakhstan President's Cup:

(gold) Winner: 2007, 2011, 2014

- Zhejiang International Tournament (China):

(gold) Winner: 2012

- Slovenia International Tournament:

(gold) Winner: 2011
- Fourth place: 2018

- Innsbruck International Tournament (Austria):

(silver) Silver: 2011

- International Tournament:

(gold) Winner: 1977

- Turkey Republic Cup:

(silver) Silver: 1962, 1964

- Sheikh Rashid Cup:

(gold) Winner: 2007

- Qatar International Tournament:

(bronze) Third place: 2012

== Team ==
=== Current squad ===
All of Iran's main lineups for four tournaments—the 2025 FIVB Men's Volleyball World Championship, the 2026 Volleyball Nations League, the 2026 Asian Men's Championship, and the 2026 Asian Games—are presented here.

| No. | Name | Date of birth | Height | Weight | Spike | Block | 2024 club |
|---|---|---|---|---|---|---|---|
| 15 | Arshia Behnezhad | 4 August 2003 | 2.00 m (6 ft 7 in) | 78 kg (172 lb) | 363 cm (143 in) | 344 cm (135 in) | (Italy) Kioene Padova |
| 9 | Poriya Hossein Khanzadeh | 1 July 2004 | 2.02 m (6 ft 8 in) | 90 kg (200 lb) | 373 cm (147 in) | 354 cm (139 in) | (Italy) Volley Lube |
| 17 | Ali Hajipour | 1 July 2001 | 2.00 m (6 ft 7 in) | 88 kg (194 lb) | 365 cm (144 in) | 366 cm (144 in) | (Iran) Foolad Sirjan |
| 49 | Morteza Sharifi | 27 May 1999 | 1.93 m (6 ft 4 in) | 79 kg (174 lb) | 373 cm (147 in) | 355 cm (140 in) | (Turkey) Galatasaray |
| 10 | Amin Esmaeilnezhad | 17 September 1996 | 2.04 m (6 ft 8 in) | 93 kg (205 lb) | 383 cm (151 in) | 357 cm (141 in) | (Italy) Verona Volley |
| 12 | Amirhossein Esfandiar | 24 January 1999 | 2.09 m (6 ft 10 in) | 110 kg (240 lb) | 355 cm (140 in) | 348 cm (137 in) | InPost ChKS Chełm, Poland |
| 6 | Bardia Saadat | 12 August 2002 | 2.07 m (6 ft 9 in) | 87 kg (192 lb) | 292 cm (115 in) | 281 cm (111 in) | Alanya Belediyespor, Turkey |
| 21 | Arman Salehi | 29 October 1992 | 1.80 m (5 ft 11 in) | 81 kg (179 lb) | 375 cm (148 in) | 345 cm (136 in) | (Iran) Shahdab Yazd |
| 8 | Mohammad Reza Hazratpour | 31 March 1999 | 1.83 m (6 ft 0 in) | 87 kg (192 lb) | 375 cm (148 in) | 355 cm (140 in) | (Iran) Shahrdari Urmia |
| 22 | Ali Haghparast | 16 December 2004 | 1.98 m (6 ft 6 in) | 95 kg (209 lb) | 380 cm (150 in) | 360 cm (140 in) | Seoul Woori Card WooriWON, South Korea |
| 66 | Seyed Eisa Naseri | 18 February 2001 | 2.03 m (6 ft 8 in) | 93 kg (205 lb) | 329 cm (130 in) | 315 cm (124 in) | (Iran) Paykan Tehran |
| 2 | Ali Ramezani | 14 April 2001 | 2.00 m (6 ft 7 in) | 92 kg (203 lb) | 353 cm (139 in) | 345 cm (136 in) | (Iran) Foolad Sirjan |
| 27 | Mohammad Valizadeh | 27 May 1999 | 2.04 m (6 ft 8 in) | 93 kg (205 lb) | 340 cm (130 in) | 320 cm (130 in) | (Iran) Foolad Sirjan |
| 1 | Amir Mohammad Golzadeh | 9 May 2003 | 2.04 m (6 ft 8 in) | 106 kg (234 lb) | 370 cm (150 in) | 351 cm (138 in) | (Italy) Kioene Padova |
| 5 | Mobin Nasri | 7 January 2003 | 2.04 m (6 ft 8 in) | 106 kg (234 lb) | 370 cm (150 in) | 351 cm (138 in) | (Italy) Kioene Padova |
| 29 | Matin Hosseini | 26 September 2005 | 2.04 m (6 ft 8 in) | 106 kg (234 lb) | 370 cm (150 in) | 351 cm (138 in) | (Italy) Kioene Padova |
| 30 | Armin Ghelichniazi | 20 January 2005 | 2.04 m (6 ft 8 in) | 106 kg (234 lb) | 370 cm (150 in) | 351 cm (138 in) | (Italy) Kioene Padova |
| 3 | Emran Kook Jili | 23 October 2007 | 2.04 m (6 ft 8 in) | 106 kg (234 lb) | 370 cm (150 in) | 351 cm (138 in) | (Italy) Kioene Padova |
| 19 | Hossein Hajikalateh | 1 December 2004 | 2.04 m (6 ft 8 in) | 106 kg (234 lb) | 370 cm (150 in) | 351 cm (138 in) | (Italy) Kioene Padova |
| 52 | Pouya Ariakhah | 11 September 2006 | 2.04 m (6 ft 8 in) | 106 kg (234 lb) | 370 cm (150 in) | 351 cm (138 in) | (Italy) Kioene Padova |
| 7 | Esmaeil Mosafer | 21 November 1997 | 2.04 m (6 ft 8 in) | 106 kg (234 lb) | 370 cm (150 in) | 351 cm (138 in) | (Italy) Kioene Padova |
| 20 | Yussuf Kazemi | 17 November 1998 | 2.10 m (6 ft 11 in) | 100 kg (220 lb) | 383 cm (151 in) | 355 cm (140 in) | (Iran) Shahdab Yazd |
| 23 | Ehsan Daanesh-Doost | 7 January 2003 | 1.98 m (6 ft 6 in) | 95 kg (209 lb) | 373 cm (147 in) | 355 cm (140 in) | (Iran) Mehregaan Noor |
| 72 | Mohsen Delavari | 3 November 2001 | 2.04 m (6 ft 8 in) | 106 kg (234 lb) | 370 cm (150 in) | 351 cm (138 in) | (Italy) Kioene Padova |
| 11 | Ilshan Davoodipour | 3 January 2003 | 2.04 m (6 ft 8 in) | 106 kg (234 lb) | 370 cm (150 in) | 351 cm (138 in) | (Italy) Kioene Padova |
| 76 | Shayan Mehrabi | 24 November 2005 | 2.04 m (6 ft 8 in) | 106 kg (234 lb) | 370 cm (150 in) | 351 cm (138 in) | (Italy) Kioene Padova |
| 99 | Mohammadnima Bateni | 9 November 2007 | 2.04 m (6 ft 8 in) | 106 kg (234 lb) | 370 cm (150 in) | 351 cm (138 in) | (Italy) Kioene Padova |

== Current head coaches ==
=== Technical staff ===
Last updated: 29 May 2026

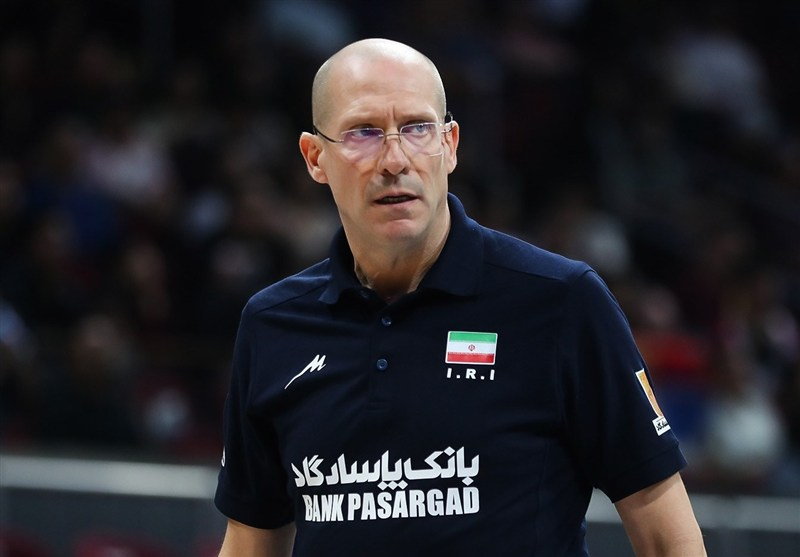
Roberto Piazza, Head coach of the Iranian national volleyball team

Coaches of the Iranian national team
| Position | Name |
|---|---|
| Head Coach | (Italy) Roberto Piazza |
| Assistant Coach | (Italy) Tomaso Totolo |
Assistant Coach
| Assistant Coach | (Iran) Abdolreza Alizadeh |
| Assistant Coach | (Iran) Mohammad Reza Tondravan |
| Assistant Coach | (Iran) Rahman Mohammadi Rad |
| Assistant Coach | (Iran) Ali Fattahi |
| Analyzer | (Iran) Mohammad Amin Shakeri |
| Strength and Conditioning Coach | (Italy) Giovanni Rossi |
| Physiotherapist | (Iran) Hossein Kord Firouzjaei |
| Masseur | (Iran) Sajjad Nouri |
| Doctor | (Iran) Mehdi Abarshi |
| General Manager | (Iran) Abbas Nazarian |

== All Head coaches ==
Note: The following list may not be complete.

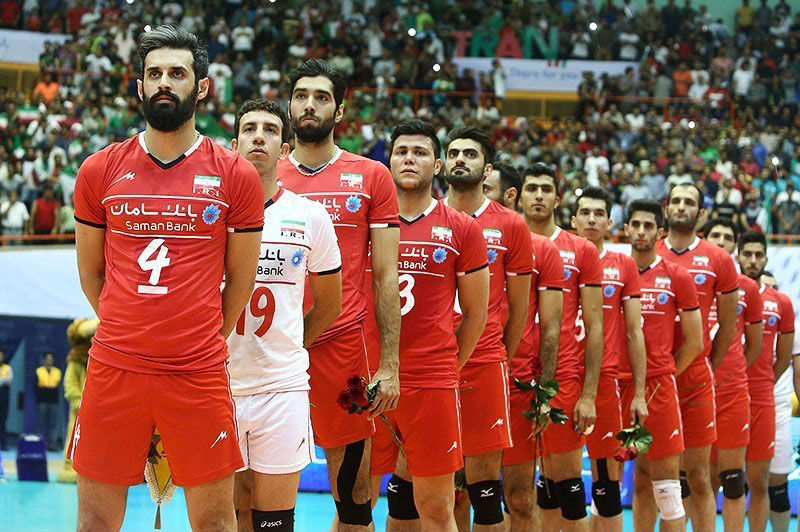
Iran volleyball team members June 2015

=== A Team ===
| Name | From | To | notes |
|---|---|---|---|
| (Pakistan) Sardar Nasrollahkhan | 1958 | | 1958 Asian Games Runners-up |
| (Iran) Fereydoon Sharifzadeh | 1958 | 1963 | |
| (Iran) Hossein Jabbarzadegan | 1964 | 1966 | 1966 Asian Games 3rd place |
| (Czechoslovakia) Miloslav Ejem | 1970 | 1972 | |
| (Japan) Tadahiko Kuroda | 1974 | | 1974 Asian Games 4th place |
| (South Korea) Park Sung | 1979 | | |
| (Iran) Yadollah Kargarpisheh | 1979 | 1981 | |
| (Iran) Farough Fakhredini | 1987 | | |
| (Iran) Masoud Salehieh | 1987 | 1989 | |
| (Iran) Hossein Ali Mehranpour | 1989 | 1991 | |
| (Iran) Mohammad Heidarkhan | 1991 | | |
| (Latvia) Ivans Bugajenkovs | 1991 | 1993 | Acted as head coach from 1991 to 1993 and as the general technical manager of all age groups from 1991 to 2007. |
| (Japan) Fumihiko Matsumoto | 1994 | | |
| (Iran) Masoud Salehieh | 1995 | | 1995 Asian Championship 4th place |
| (Iran) Mehdi Saberpour | 1997 | | |
| (Japan) Fumihiko Matsumoto | 1998 | | |
| (Iran) Mostafa Karkhaneh | 1999 | 2001 | |
| (Iran) Hossein Ali Mehranpour | 2001 | | |
| (South Korea) Park Ki-won | 2002 | 2005 | 2002 Asian Games Runners-up; 2003 Asian Championship 3rd place |
| (Serbia) Milorad Kijac | 2006 | | |
| (Serbia) Zoran Gajić | 2007 | 2008 | |
| (Iran) Hossein Maadani | 2008 | 2010 | 2008 Asian Cup Champions; 2009 Asian Championship Runners-up; 2010 Asian Cup Champions; 2010 Asian Games Runners-up |
| (Argentina) Julio Velasco | 2011 | 2014 | 2011 Asian Championship Champions; 2013 Asian Championship Champions; 2013 World Grand Champions Cup 4th place |
| (Serbia) Slobodan Kovač | 2014 | 2015 | 2014 World League 4th place 2014 World Championship 6th place 2014 Asian Games Champions |
| (Argentina) Raúl Lozano | 2016 | | 2016 Olympic Games 5th place |
| (Montenegro) Igor Kolaković | 2017 | 2020 | 2017 World Grand Champions Cup 3rd place 2018 Asian Games Champions; 2019 Nations League 5th place 2019 Asian Championship Champions; 2020 Olympic Games Qualification |
| (Russia) Vladimir Alekno | 2020 | 2021 | 2020 Olympic Games 9th place |
| (Iran) Behrouz Ataei | 2021 | 2023 | 2021 Asian Championship Champions; 2023 Asian Championship Runners-up; 2022 Asian Games Champions |
| (Iran) Alireza Tolookian | 2023 | | |
| (Brazil) Maurício Paes | 2024 | | |
| (Iran) Peyman Akbari | 2024 | | |
| (Italy) Roberto Piazza | 2025 | 2026 | 2026 Asian Championship Runners-up; 2026 Asian Games Champions |

== Captains ==
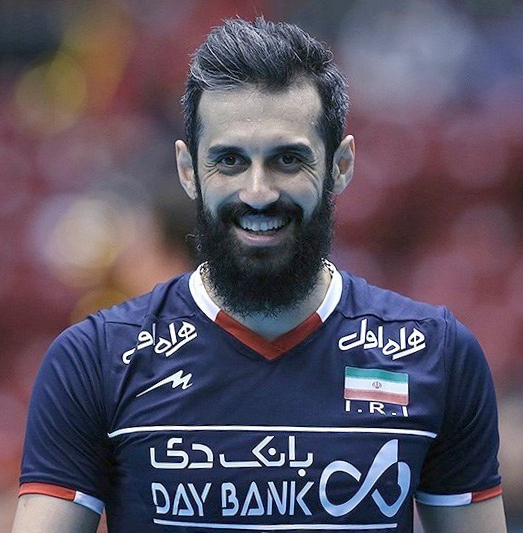
Saeid Marouf, the most decorated captain of the Iranian men's national volleyball team.

- Current captains with the longest tenures as captain

| بازیکن | سال‌ها |
|---|---|
| Hassan Kord | 1962–1975 |
| Mohammad Heydarkhan | 1975–1982 |
| Amir Heidari | 1987–1998 |
| Iraj Mozaffari | 1996–2000 |
| Peyman Akbari | 2006–2002 |
| Alireza Nadi | 2013–2006 |
| Saeid Marouf | 2021–2013 |
| Milad Ebadipour | 2021–2022 |
| Mohammad Mousavi | 2023–2024 |
| Milad Ebadipour | 2024–2025 |
| Javad Karimi | 2025–2025 |
| Morteza Sharifi | 2025–2026 |
| Amin Esmaeilnezhad | –2026‌ |

== Youth teams ==
=== Results ===
Source:

=== FIVB U21 World Championship ===
Champions Runners-up 3rd place 4th place

FIVB U21 World Championship
| Year | Rank | M | W | L | SF | SA | Squad |
|---|---|---|---|---|---|---|---|
| (Brazil) 1977 | Did Not Compete or Did Not Qualify | | | | | | Squad |
| (United States) 1981 | Did Not Compete or Did Not Qualify | | | | | | Squad |
| (Italy) 1985 | Did Not Compete or Did Not Qualify | | | | | | Squad |
| (Bahrain) 1987 | Did Not Compete or Did Not Qualify | | | | | | Squad |
| (Greece) 1989 | Did Not Compete or Did Not Qualify | | | | | | Squad |
| (Egypt) 1991 | Did Not Compete or Did Not Qualify | | | | | | Squad |
| (Argentina) 1993 | 9th place | 6 | 1 | 5 | 6 | 17 | Squad |
| (Malaysia) 1995 | Did Not Qualify | | | | | | Squad |
| (Bahrain) 1997 | 9th place | 4 | 1 | 3 | 3 | 10 | Squad |
| (Thailand) 1999 | 8th place | 7 | 2 | 5 | 9 | 16 | Squad |
| (Poland) 2001 | Did Not Qualify | | | | | | Squad |
| (Iran) 2003 | 6th place | 7 | 4 | 3 | 13 | 13 | Squad |
| (India) 2005 | 5th place | 7 | 4 | 3 | 17 | 12 | Squad |
| (Morocco) 2007 | 3rd place | 7 | 5 | 2 | 18 | 10 | Squad |
| (India) 2009 | 7th place | 8 | 5 | 3 | 15 | 14 | Squad |
| (Brazil) 2011 | 6th place | 8 | 4 | 4 | 17 | 13 | Squad |
| (Turkey) 2013 | 5th place | 8 | 7 | 1 | 21 | 5 | Squad |
| (Mexico) 2015 | 12th place | 8 | 3 | 5 | 15 | 17 | Squad |
| (Czech Republic) 2017 | 5th place | 8 | 6 | 2 | 22 | 14 | Squad |
| (Bahrain) 2019 | Champions | 8 | 6 | 2 | 21 | 9 | Squad |
| (Italy) (Bulgaria) 2021 | 9th place | 8 | 6 | 2 | 22 | 8 | Squad |
| (Bahrain) 2023 | Champions | 8 | 8 | 0 | 24 | 7 | Squad |
| (China) 2025 | Champions | 9 | 9 | 0 | 27 | 6 | Squad |
| Total | 15/23 | 111 | 71 | 40 | 250 | 169 | - |

=== Asian U20 Championship ===
Champions Runners-up 3rd place 4th place

Asian U20 Championship
| Year | Rank | M | W | L | SF | SA | Squad |
|---|---|---|---|---|---|---|---|
| (South Korea) 1980 | Did Not Compete | | | | | | Squad |
| (Saudi Arabia) 1984 | Did Not Compete | | | | | | Squad |
| (Thailand) 1986 | Did Not Compete | | | | | | Squad |
| (Indonesia) 1988 | 11th place | 0 | 0 | 0 | 0 | 0 | Squad |
| (Thailand) 1990 | 9th place | 0 | 0 | 0 | 0 | 0 | Squad |
| (Iran) 1992 | 4th place | 0 | 0 | 0 | 0 | 0 | Squad |
| (Qatar) 1994 | 6th place | 0 | 0 | 0 | 0 | 0 | Squad |
| (Vietnam) 1996 | 6th place | 0 | 0 | 0 | 0 | 0 | Squad |
| (Iran) 1998 | Champions | 7 | 7 | 0 | 21 | 2 | Squad |
| (Iran) 2000 | 3rd place | 6 | 4 | 2 | 15 | 10 | Squad |
| (Iran) 2002 | Champions | 6 | 6 | 0 | 18 | 4 | Squad |
| (Qatar) 2004 | 2nd place | 5 | 3 | 2 | 10 | 7 | Squad |
| (Iran) 2006 | Champions | 5 | 4 | 1 | 14 | 6 | Squad |
| (Iran) 2008 | Champions | 7 | 7 | 0 | 21 | 3 | Squad |
| (Thailand) 2010 | 2nd place | 8 | 7 | 1 | 22 | 4 | Squad |
| (Iran) 2012 | 3rd place | 7 | 6 | 1 | 20 | 6 | Squad |
| (Bahrain) 2014 | Champions | 7 | 7 | 0 | 21 | 3 | Squad |
| (Taiwan) 2016 | 2nd place | 8 | 7 | 1 | 23 | 4 | Squad |
| (Bahrain) 2018 | Champions | 6 | 6 | 0 | 18 | 1 | Squad |
| (Bahrain) 2022 | Champions | 5 | 5 | 0 | 15 | 4 | Squad |
| (Indonesia) 2024 | Champions | 7 | 7 | 0 | 21 | 2 | Squad |
| Total | 18/21 | 84 | 76 | 8 | 229 | 56 | - |

=== FIVB Volleyball Boys' U19 World Championship ===
Champions Runners-up 3rd place 4th place

FIVB Volleyball Boys' U19 World Championship
| Year | Rank | M | W | L | SW | SL | Ref |
|---|---|---|---|---|---|---|---|
| (United Arab Emirates) 1989 | 4th place | 7 | 3 | 4 | 11 | 13 | |
| (Portugal) 1991 | Did Not Qualify | | | | | | |
| (Turkey) 1993 | Did Not Qualify | | | | | | |
| (Puerto Rico) 1995 | Did Not Qualify | | | | | | |
| (Iran) 1997 | 9th place | 4 | 1 | 3 | 6 | 9 | |
| (Saudi Arabia) 1999 | Did Not Qualify | | | | | | |
| (Egypt) 2001 | 2nd place | 6 | 4 | 2 | 13 | 8 | |
| (Thailand) 2003 | 3rd place | 7 | 5 | 2 | 13 | 8 | |
| (Algeria) 2005 | 5th place | 7 | 4 | 3 | 14 | 12 | |
| (Mexico) 2007 | 1st place | 8 | 5 | 3 | 18 | 16 | |
| (Italy) 2009 | 2nd place | 8 | 6 | 2 | 21 | 9 | |
| (Argentina) 2011 | 10th place | 8 | 6 | 2 | 20 | 9 | |
| (Mexico) 2013 | 4th place | 8 | 5 | 3 | 16 | 13 | |
| (Argentina) 2015 | 3rd place | 8 | 6 | 2 | 20 | 10 | |
| (Bahrain) 2017 | 1st place | 8 | 8 | 0 | 24 | 3 | |
| (Tunisia) 2019 | 5th place | 8 | 5 | 3 | 17 | 12 | |
| (Iran) 2021 | 3rd place | 8 | 6 | 2 | 19 | 9 | |
| (Argentina) 2023 | 2nd place | 8 | 7 | 1 | 22 | 6 | |
| (Uzbekistan) 2025 | TBD | 0 | 0 | 0 | 0 | 0 | |
| Total | 15/19 | 103 | 71 | 32 | 237 | 137 | |

=== Asian U19/18 Championship ===
Champions Runners up Third place Fourth place

Asian Boys' U18 Championship
| Year | Rank | M | W | L | SW | SL | Ref |
|---|---|---|---|---|---|---|---|
| (Philippines) 1997 | Did Not Compete | | | | | | |
| (Taiwan) 1999 | Did Not Compete | | | | | | |
| (Iran) 2001 | 1st place | 7 | 7 | 0 | 21 | 5 | |
| (India) 2003 | 2nd place | 7 | 6 | 1 | 19 | 5 | |
| (Iran) 2005 | 1st place | 6 | 6 | 0 | 18 | 2 | |
| (Malaysia) 2007 | 1st place | 8 | 6 | 2 | 19 | 7 | |
| (Sri Lanka) 2008 | 1st place | 7 | 7 | 0 | 21 | 4 | |
| (Iran) 2010 | 1st place | 6 | 5 | 1 | 16 | 10 | |
| (Iran) 2012 | 1st place | 6 | 6 | 0 | 18 | 5 | |
| (Sri Lanka) 2014 | 2nd place | 6 | 6 | 0 | 18 | 3 | |
| (Myanmar) 2017 | 4th place | 6 | 4 | 2 | 15 | 7 | |
| (Iran) 2018 | 3rd place | 6 | 4 | 2 | 13 | 8 | |
| (Iran) 2020 | Canceled | | | | | | |
| (Iran) 2022 | 2nd place | 6 | 5 | 1 | 15 | 4 | |
| (Bahrain) 2024 | 2nd place | 7 | 5 | 2 | 19 | 6 | |
| Total | 12/14 | 78 | 67 | 11 | 212 | 66 | |

=== Central Asian U19/18 Championship ===
Central Asian Boys' U19 Championship
| Year | Rank | M | W | L | SW | SL | Ref |
|---|---|---|---|---|---|---|---|
| (Uzbekistan) 2024 | 2nd place | 0 | 0 | 0 | 0 | 0 | |
| (Uzbekistan) 2025 | 1st place | 5 | 5 | 0 | 15 | 0 | |
| Total | 2/2 | 5 | 5 | 0 | 15 | 0 | |

== Stadium ==
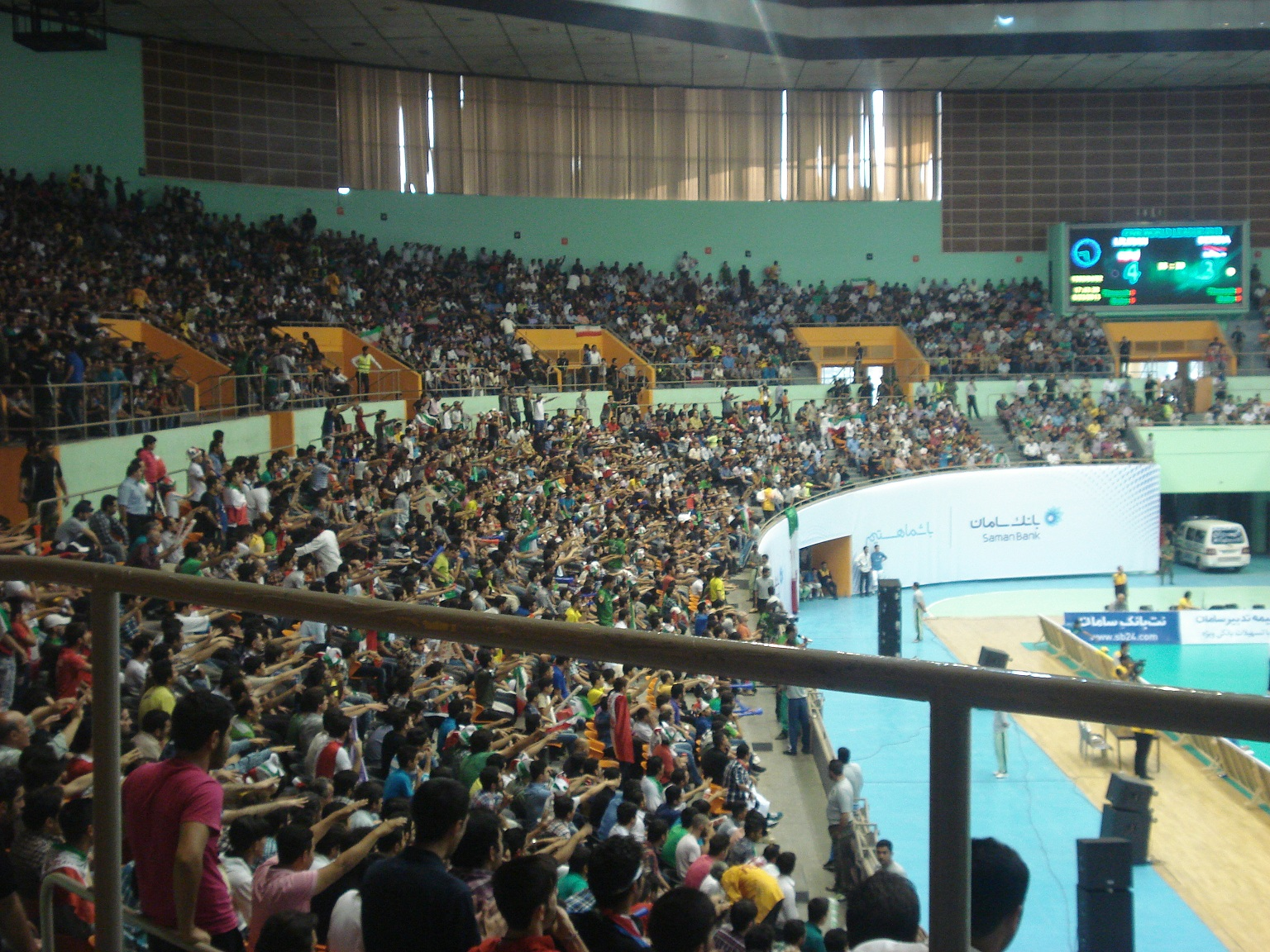
Azadi indoor stadium with Iranian fans

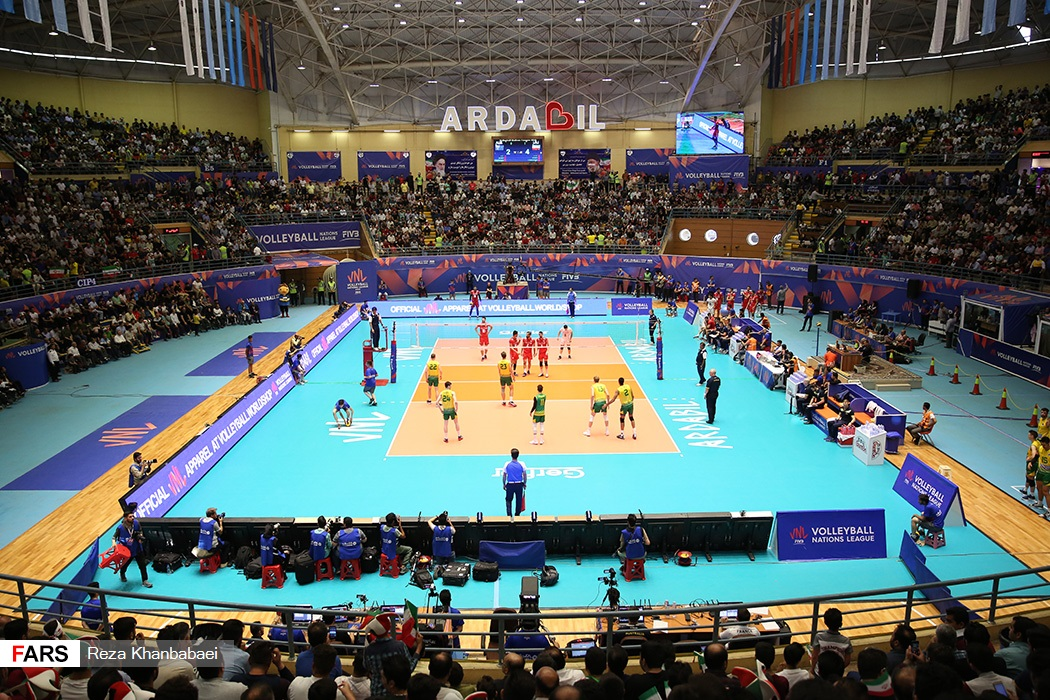
Rezazadeh Stadium in 2019 FIVB Volleyball Men's Nations League

The team's home arena are Azadi Indoor Stadium, Azadi Volleyball Hall.

== Kit providers ==
The table below shows the history of kit providers for the Iran national volleyball team.

| Period | Kit provider |
|---|---|
| 2000–2018 | Asics; Mikasa; Fuerza; Mizuno; Ideal |
| 2025- | Merooj |

=== Sponsorship ===
Primary sponsors include: main sponsors like MCI and Bank Pasargad, Refah Stores other sponsors: Roamer.

== See also ==
- Volleyball
- Iran men's national under-23 volleyball team
- Iran men's national under-21 volleyball team
- Iran men's national under-19 volleyball team
- Iran men's national under-17 volleyball team
