= Afghanistan women's national volleyball team =

National women's volleyball team

Afghanistan
- Nickname(s): Flying Angels
- Association: Afghanistan National Volleyball Federation
- Confederation: AVC
- Head coach: Nasrin Khazani
- FIVB ranking: NR (2 October 2026)

Uniforms
Home	Away

The Afghanistan women's national volleyball team represents Afghanistan in international women's volleyball competitions and friendly matches.

== History ==
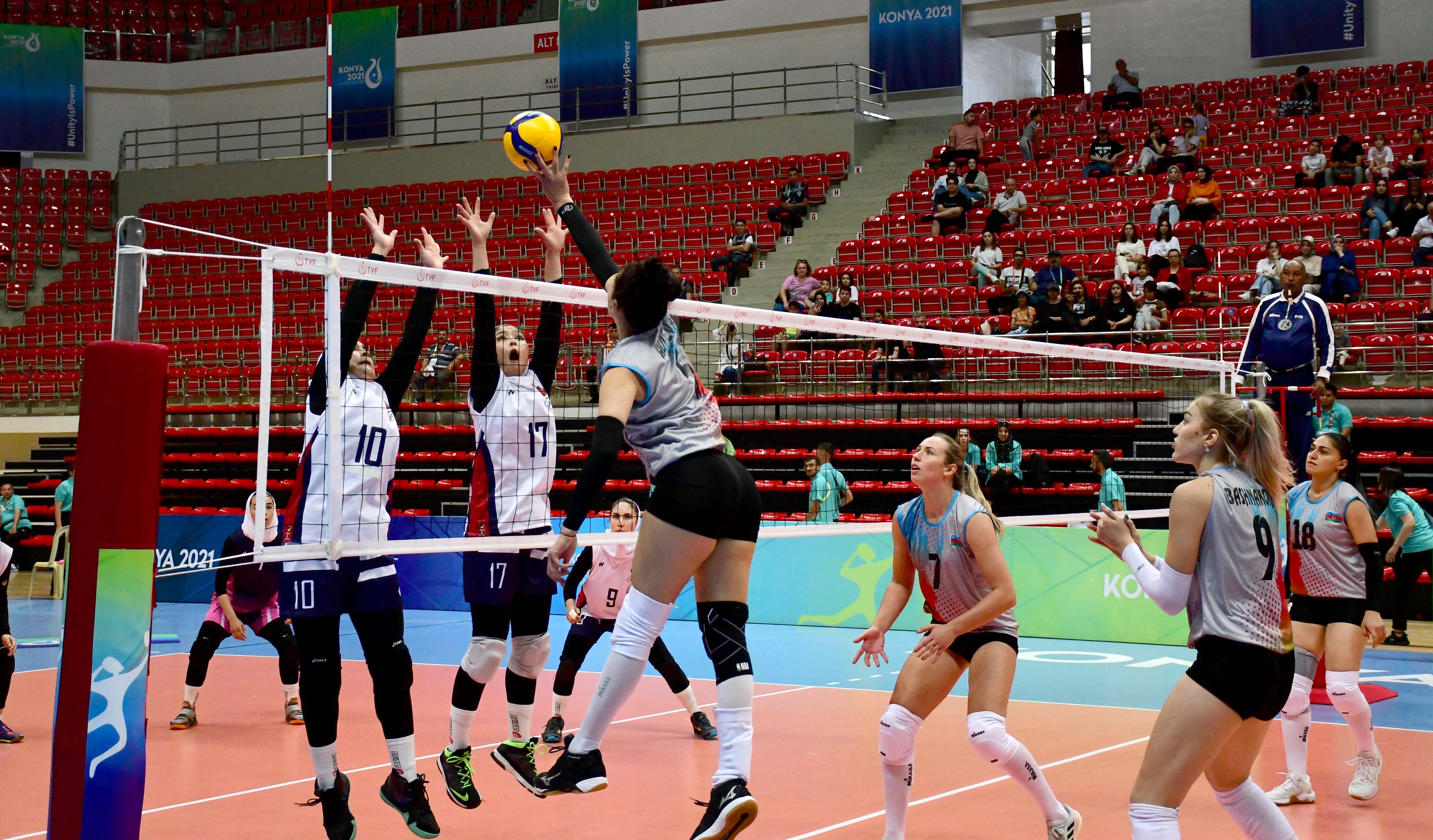
Afghanistan (left) playing against Azerbaijan (right) at the 2021 Islamic Solidarity Games

In the 2010s, the Islamic Republic era, Afghanistan already has a women's national volleyball team.

=== Post 2021 ===
After the 2021 Fall of Kabul to the Taliban, women in Afghanistan were barred from playing sports.

Despite this, Afghanistan had receive funding from the FIVB to help maintain its women's national team. In 2023, the team made up from the Afghan diaspora competed at the 2022 Asian Games in China.

Due to the joint support of the FIVB, IOC and National Olympic Committee of the Islamic Republic of Afghanistan, the Afghanistan women’s volleyball team have continued to play in various international competitions. This made volleyball the only sport since the start of Taliban rule to field a women's national team internationally.

== Competition records ==
=== Asian Games ===
- (China) 2022 — 13th place

=== Islamic Solidarity Games ===
- (Turkey) 2021 — Group stage

=== CAVA Challenge Cup ===
- (Maldives) 2024 – 4th place

=== AVC Central Asia Zone Championship ===
- (Bangladesh) 2019 – 5th place

== Head coach ==
- (Iran) Fatemeh Zahra "Nasrin" Khazani (2023)

== Videos ==
- Afghan National Women's Volleyball Team vs. ISAF YouTube.com video
