= Tajikistan men's national volleyball team =

National sports team

Tajikistan
- Association: Volleyball Federation of Tajikistan
- Confederation: AVC
- Head coach: Mohammad Asadollahi Saraghein
- FIVB ranking: NR (1 October 2026)

Uniforms
| Home | Away |

The Tajikistan men's national volleyball team represents Tajikistan in international volleyball competitions and friendly matches.

Before independence, Tajik-born volleyballers represented Soviet Union, one notable player was Valeri Kravchenko.

Tajikistan is yet to participate in any major tournaments. However the team do play friendly matches, back in 2014 they played a series versus Afghanistan.

== Competition history ==
=== CAVA Challenge Cup ===
- (Uzbekistan) 2024 — 6th place
