= Bangladesh women's national volleyball team =

National sports team

Bangladesh
- Association: Bangladesh Volleyball Federation
- Confederation: AVC
- Head coach: Unknown
- FIVB ranking: 69 ▲154 (24 May 2026)

Uniforms
Home	Away

Summer Olympics
- Appearances: 0

World Championship
- Appearances: 0

CAVA Challenge Cup
- Appearances: 1 (First in 2019)
- Best result: 8th, (2019)

Bangladesh women's national volleyball team is the national women's volleyball team of Bangladesh. It is governed by the Bangladesh Volleyball Federation (BVF) and takes part in international volleyball competitions and friendly matches.

== Competition records ==
=== CAVA Challenge Cup ===
Champions Runners up

CAVA Women's Volleyball Challenge Cup records
Year	Result	Pld	W	L	SW	SL
(Nepal) 2023	Group stage	8/8	The full data of the tournament have not been found			
(Maldives) 2024	Did not participate					
Total	0 Title	1/2	0	0	0	0

=== AVC Central Asia Zone Championship ===
Champions Runners up

AVC Central Asia Zone Championship records
Year	Result	Position	Pld	W	L	SW	SL
(Bangladesh) 2019	Round-robin	4/6	The full data of the tournament have not been found				
(Bangladesh) 2021	Round-robin	3/6	The full data of the tournament have not been found				
Total	0 Title	1/2	0	0	0	0	0
