= Kyrgyzstan women's national volleyball team =

National sports team

Kyrgyzstan
- Association: Volleyball Federation of Kyrgyzstan
- Confederation: AVC
- FIVB ranking: 87 ▼24 (2 October 2026)

Uniforms
Home

The Kyrgyzstan women's national volleyball team represents Kyrgyzstan in international women's volleyball competitions and friendly matches.

The team has been competing as early as 2017, when it finished as bronze medalists at the 4th Islamic Solidarity Games in Azerbaijan.

They are a two-time champions of the CAVA Women's Volleyball Challenge Cup winning the 2024 and 2025 editions.

The took part at the 2026 AVC Women's Volleyball Cup in Candon, Philippines.

== Competition records ==
=== Asian Nations Cup ===
- (Thailand) 2022 – did not participate
- (Indonesia) 2023 – did not participate
- (Philippines) 2024 – did not participate
- (Vietnam) 2025 – did not participate
- (Philippines) 2026 – 11th place

=== CAVA Challenge Cup ===
- (Nepal) 2023 – 6th place
- (Maldives) 2024 – Gold medal
- (Maldives) 2025 – Gold medal

=== Islamic Solidarity Games ===
- (Azerbaijan) 2017 – Bronze medal
- (Turkey) 2021 – did not participate
- (Saudi Arabia) 2025 – did not participate
