= Tajikistan women's national volleyball team =

National sports team

Tajikistan
- Association: Volleyball Federation of Tajikistan
- Confederation: AVC
- Head coach: Mohammad Asadollahi Saraghein
- FIVB ranking: NR (29 June 2025)

Uniforms
Home	Away

Summer Olympics
- Appearances: 0

World Championship
- Appearances: 0

The Tajikistan women's national volleyball team is the national women's volleyball team of Tajikistan.

Most notable Tajikistan-born female volleyballer is Angelina Grün who formerly represented Germany.

== Tournament records ==
=== Asian Championship ===
Year	Rank	Pld	W	L	SW	SL
(Thailand) 2007	Withdrew	-	-	-	-	-
(Vietnam) 2009	Did not enter	-	-	-	-	-
(Taiwan) 2011	Did not enter	-	-	-	-	-
(Thailand) 2013	Did not enter	-	-	-	-	-
(China) 2015	Did not enter	-	-	-	-	-
Total	0/18	-	-	-	-	-

=== Asian Games ===
Year	Rank	Pld	W	L	SW	SL
(Qatar) 2006	9th place	4	0	4	0	12
(China) 2010	11th place	5	0	5	0	15
(South Korea) 2014	Did not enter	-	-	-	-	-
Total	2/14	9	0	9	0	27

=== Asian Cup ===
Year	Rank	Pld	W	L	SW	SL
(Thailand) 2008	Did not enter	-	-	-	-	-
(China) 2010	Did not enter	-	-	-	-	-
(Kazakhstan) 2012	Did not enter	-	-	-	-	-
(China) 2014	Did not enter	-	-	-	-	-
(Vietnam) 2016	Did not enter	-	-	-	-	-
Total	0/5	-	-	-	-	-

=== CAVA Challenge Cup ===
CAVA Challenge Cup record
Year	Position
(Maldives) 2024	3rd place, bronze medalist(s)
