= Volleyball at the 2026 Asian Games =

- Venue: Okazaki Central Park General Gymnasium; Park Arena Komaki
- Dates: 16 September – 3 October 2026
- Competitors: 359 from 18 nations

Volleyball at the 2026 Asian Games was held between 16 September and 3 October 2026 at two locations in Aichi Prefecture. In this tournament, sixteen teams participated in the men's competition, while fourteen teams participated in the women's competition.

== Schedule ==
The schedule is as follows:

P	Preliminary round	C	Classification	¼	Quarterfinals	½	Semifinals	F	Finals

Date Event	September																		October					
Date Event	16th Wed	17th Thu	18th Fri	19th Sat	20th Sun		21st Mon		22nd Tue		23rd Wed	24th Thu	25th Fri	26th Sat	27th Sun	28th Mon	29th Tue	30th Wed	1st Thu		2nd Fri		3rd Sat	
Men	—N/a														P	P	P	—N/a	C	¼	C	½	C	F
Women	P	P	P	—N/a	C	¼	C	½	C	F	—N/a													

== Medalists ==
Event	Gold	Silver	Bronze
Men	Iran; Mobin Nasri; Poriya Hossein Khanzadeh; Amin Esmaeilnezhad; Ilshan Davoodipour; Arshia Behnezhad; Ali Hajipour; Hossein Haji Kalateh; Yousef Kazemi; Ali Haghparast; Mohammad Valizadeh; Morteza Sharifi; Eisa Nasseri	Japan; Tatsunori Otsuka; Yudai Arai; Yudai Kawahigashi; Masato Kai; Keigo Nishimoto; Hiroto Nishiyama; Keihan Takahashi; Ryo Shimokawa; Rikuto Goto; Kento Asano; Keitaro Nishikawa; Kazuyuki Takahashi	Pakistan; Muhammad Hamad; Jabran Jabran; Abu Bakar Siddique; Muhammad Yahya; Usman Faryad Ali; Fahad Raza; Murad Khan; Khizar Hayat; Murad Jehan; Afaq Khan; Hamid Yazman; Musawer Khan
Women	China; Wu Mengjie; Zhuang Yushan; Tang Xin; Zhang Zixuan; Gong Xiangyu; Chen Houyu; Wang Aoqian; Yang Shuming; Dong Yuhan; Xie Shengyu; Guo Zhongnan; Wang Mengjie	Japan; Yukiko Wada; Yoshino Sato; Nanami Seki; Nichika Yamada; Maki Yamaguchi; Hitomi Shiode; Hinata Shigihara; Mana Nishizaki; Ai Hirota; Ayane Kitamado; Miina Inoue; Miku Akimoto	Thailand; Piyanut Pannoy; Pornpun Guedpard; Kanyarat Kunmuang; Thatdao Nuekjang; Warisara Seetaloed; Kalyarat Khamwong; Sasipaporn Janthawisut; Natthanicha Jaisaen; Pimpichaya Kokram; Ajcharaporn Kongyot; Chatchu-on Moksri; Kaewkalaya Kamulthala

== Medal table ==
* Host nation (Japan)

Rank	Nation	Gold	Silver	Bronze	Total
1	China	1	0	0	1
1	Iran	1	0	0	1
3	Japan*	0	2	0	2
4	Pakistan	0	0	1	1
4	Thailand	0	0	1	1
Totals (5 entries)		2	2	2	6

== Venues ==
Okazaki	Komaki
Okazaki Central Park General Gymnasium	Park Arena Komaki
Capacity: 4,673	Capacity: 5,000

== Qualification ==
Nation	Men's	Women's
China	Yes	Yes
Chinese Taipei	Yes	Yes
Hong Kong	Yes	Yes
India	Yes	—N/a
Indonesia	Yes	Yes
Iran	Yes	—N/a
Japan	Yes	Yes
Kazakhstan	Yes	Yes
Kyrgyzstan	Yes	Yes
Mongolia	—N/a	Yes
Nepal	—N/a	Yes
Pakistan	Yes	—N/a
Philippines	Yes	Yes
Qatar	Yes	Yes
South Korea	Yes	Yes
Thailand	Yes	Yes
Uzbekistan	Yes	—N/a
Vietnam	Yes	Yes
Total: 18 NOCs	16/16	14/14

== Draw ==
The draw for the competition was held on 23 July 2026.

=== Men ===
The Asian Volleyball Confederation confirmed the qualified teams in late-May 2026. Teams qualified based on FIVB rankings.

- Japan (6; host)
- Iran (17)
- Qatar (42)
- South Korea (25)
- China (34)
- Pakistan (38)
- Indonesia (45)
- Chinese Taipei (55)
- India (49)
- Thailand (52)
- Vietnam (60)
- Kyrgyzstan (81)
- Kazakhstan (78)
- Philippines (111)
- Hong Kong (129)
- Uzbekistan (133)

=== Pools ===
Pool A

- Japan
- Pakistan
- Kazakhstan
- Uzbekistan

Pool B

- Iran
- Indonesia
- Thailand
- Kyrgyzstan

Pool C

- Qatar
- India
- Vietnam
- Hong Kong

Pool D

- South Korea
- China
- Chinese Taipei
- Philippines

=== Women ===
The Asian Volleyball Confederation confirmed the qualified teams in late-May 2026. Teams qualified based on FIVB rankings.

- Japan (6; host)
- China (7)
- Thailand (13)
- Vietnam (32)
- Kazakhstan (42)
- Chinese Taipei (37)
- South Korea (28)
- Philippines (56)
- Kyrgyzstan (117)
- Indonesia (53)
- Hong Kong (126)
- Mongolia (129)
- Nepal (69)
- Qatar (106)

=== Pools ===
Pool A

- Japan
- Indonesia
- Nepal

Pool B

- China
- Kazakhstan
- Philippines

Pool C

- Thailand
- Chinese Taipei
- Kyrgyzstan
- Mongolia

Pool D

- Vietnam
- South Korea
- Hong Kong
- Qatar

== Final standing ==
=== Men ===
Rank	Team	Pld	W	L
1st place, gold medalist(s)	Iran	6	6	0
2nd place, silver medalist(s)	Japan	6	5	1
3rd place, bronze medalist(s)	Pakistan	6	4	2
4	China	6	4	2
5	Thailand	6	4	2
6	India	6	4	2
7	South Korea	6	3	3
8	Qatar	6	2	4
9	Chinese Taipei	6	4	2
10	Vietnam	6	3	3
11	Kazakhstan	6	3	3
12	Indonesia	6	2	4
13	Philippines	6	2	4
14	Kyrgyzstan	6	1	5
15	Uzbekistan	6	1	5
16	Hong Kong	6	0	6

=== Women ===
Rank	Team	Pld	W	L
1st place, gold medalist(s)	China	5	5	0
2nd place, silver medalist(s)	Japan	5	4	1
3rd place, bronze medalist(s)	Thailand	6	5	1
4	South Korea	6	4	2
5	Chinese Taipei	6	4	2
6	Indonesia	5	2	3
7	Vietnam	6	3	3
8	Kazakhstan	5	1	4
9	Philippines	5	3	2
10	Hong Kong	5	2	3
11	Mongolia	5	2	3
12	Nepal	5	1	4
13	Kyrgyzstan	5	1	4
14	Qatar	5	0	5
