= Volleyball at the 2026 Asian Games – Men's tournament =

Men's volleyball at the 2026 Asian Games
- Venue: Okazaki Central Park General Gymnasium; Park Arena Komaki
- Date: 27 September – 3 October 2026
- Competitors: 191 from 16 nations

Medalists
gold medal	Iran
silver medal	Japan
bronze medal	Pakistan

The men's tournament in volleyball at the 2026 Asian Games was the 20th edition of the event at the Asian Games, organised by the Asian Volleyball Confederation, in conjunction with the OCA. It will be held in Okazaki and Komaki, Aichi Prefecture, Japan from 27 September – 3 October 2026.

== Schedule ==
The schedule is as follows:

P	Preliminary round	C	Classification	¼	Quarterfinals	½	Semifinals	F	Finals

Sept 27	Sept 28	Sept 29	Sept 30	Oct 1		Oct 2		Oct 3	
P	P	P	—N/a	C	¼	C	½	C	F

== Teams ==
- China
- Chinese Taipei
- Hong Kong
- India
- Indonesia
- Iran
- Japan (host)
- Kazakhstan
- Kyrgyzstan
- Pakistan
- Philippines
- Qatar
- South Korea
- Thailand
- Uzbekistan
- Vietnam

== Draw ==
=== Seeding ===
Seeded teams	Pot 3	Pot 4
Japan (Hosts); Iran (19); Qatar (24); South Korea (26); China (35); India (43); Indonesia (44); Pakistan (49)	Chinese Taipei (60); Thailand (61); Kazakhstan (63); Vietnam (66)	Kyrgyzstan (76); Philippines (95); Hong Kong (114); Uzbekistan (123)

=== Pools composition ===
Pool A	Pool B	Pool C	Pool D
Japan	Iran	Qatar	South Korea
Pakistan	Indonesia	India	China
Kazakhstan	Thailand	Vietnam	Chinese Taipei
Uzbekistan	Kyrgyzstan	Hong Kong	Philippines

== Pool standing procedure ==
In order to establish the ranking of teams after the group stage, the following criteria was implemented:

1. Number of matches won
2. Match points
3. Sets ratio
4. Points ratio
5. Result of the last match between the tied teams

Match won 3–0 or 3–1: 3 match points for the winner, 0 match points for the loser.
Match won 3–2: 2 match points for the winner, 1 match point for the loser.

== Rosters ==
China	Chinese Taipei	Hong Kong	India
Wen Zihua; Jiang Chuan; Wang Hebin; Li Lei; Yu Yuantai; Li Yongzhen; Wu Zhai; Zhang Zhejia; Peng Shikun; Qu Zongshuai; Zhang Jingyin; Wang Bin	Lu Chiang Yao-kai; Huang Yu-chen; Chen Jie-ting; Chuang Shao-chieh; Tsai Pei-chang; Chang Yu-chen; Liu Yu-lin; Chang Yu-sheng; Wang Ping-hsun; Khanh Yun-liang; When Yi-kai; Huang Jheng-liang	Wan Ka Nam; Yuen Sze Wai; Ko Ching Kim; Chan King Hoi; Lam Sze Lok; Tam Chun Ho Damian; Kong Cheuk Hin; Lau Kin Ken; Cheung Ngai Yiu Nam; Chiu Yin Laam; Wong Cheuk Nam Samuel; Cheng Tzs Yui	Amith Singh; Joel Bejamin Jebaraj; Muhammad Chatham; Chirag Yadav; Anand Kottarathil; Ashwal Rai; Jerome Vinith Charles; Om Vasant Lad; Muthusamy Appavu; John Joseph E J; Shikhar Singh; Hemanth Pulparambil
Indonesia	Iran	Japan	Kazakhstan
Boy Arnez Arabi; Hendra Kurniawan; Muhammad Malisi; Ahmad Gumilar; Fahri Septian Putramata; Rama Fazza Fauzan; Farhan Halim; Dio Zulfikri; Fahreza Rakha; Fauzan Nibras; Alfin Daniel Pratama; Sigit Ardian	Mobin Nasri; Poriya Hossein Khanzadeh; Amin Esmaeilnezhad; Ilshan Davoodipour; Arshia Behnezhad; Ali Hajipour; Hossein Haji Kalateh; Yousef Kazemi; Ali Haghparast; Mohammad Valizadeh; Morteza Sharifi; Eisa Nasseri	Tatsunori Otsuka; Yudai Arai; Yudai Kawahigashi; Masato Kai; Keigo Nishimoto; Hiroto Nishiyama; Keihan Takahashi; Ryo Shimokawa; Rikuto Goto; Kento Asano; Keitaro Nishikawa; Kazuyuki Takahashi	Murojon Khavazmatov; Nurlybek Maksat; Azamat Seilkhanov; Aibek Zhaxylykov; Vladislav Kunchenko; Nurlibek Nurmakhambetov; Ilya Tavolzhanskiy; Dinmukhammed Kabdulov; Assylkhan Izbergenuly; Anton Kuznetsov; Klim Ryukhov; Vladislav Mastikhin
Kyrgyzstan	Pakistan	Philippines	Qatar
Amantur Bazhiev; Nurmukhammed Toktoev; Baiastan Zhyrgalbek Uulu; Onolbek Kanybek Uulu; Iliaz Abdimomun Uulu; Baiel Askar Uulu; Ernis Erkinovich Toktosunov; Zhamalidin Musaev; Roman Shilov; Zhantemir Zheenbek Uulu; Manazbek Nuraly Uulu	Muhammad Hamad; Jabran Jabran; Abu Bakar Siddique; Muhammad Yahya; Usman Faryad Ali; Fahad Raza; Murad Khan; Khizar Hayat; Murad Jehan; Afaq Khan; Hamid Yazman; Musawer Khan	Bryan Bagunas; Josh Ybañez; Ave Joshua Retamar; Jude Garcia; Adrian Villados; Lirick John Mendoza; Rwenzmel Taguibolos; Leo Ordiales; Marck Jesus Espejo; Lloyd Josafat; Mhicaelo Buddin; Joshua Magalaman	Papemaguette Diagne; Mubarak Al-Kuwari; Renan Ribeiro; Abdullah Hassanein; Mohamed Widatalla; Yousef Alyafeai; Mahdi Sammoud; Ahmed Noaman; Ahmed Abdelrahim; Naji Abukhiarah; Abdelrahman Bakry; Mubarak Musa Madut
South Korea	Thailand	Uzbekistan	Vietnam
Cha Young-seok; Hwang Seung-bin; Park Kyeong-min; Heo Su-bong; Han Tae-jun; Lim Sung-jin; Jeong Han-yong; Im Dong-hyeok; Choi Jun-hyeok; Lee Sang-hyeon; Shin Ho-jin; Lim Jae-young	Toopadit Phraput; Napadet Bhinijdee; Jakkrit Thanomnoi; Anuchit Pakdeekaew; Nakharin Inthanu; Suwit Mahasiriyothin; Narongrit Janpirom; Boonyarid Wongtorn; Kiadtiphum Ramsin; Thanat Bamrungphakdi; Anurak Phanram; Chaiwat Thungkham	Umirbek Rakhimov; Bilolbek Hakimov; Khabibullokhon Isamov; Mirziyod Murodov; Islomjon Sobirov; Aybek Kaypanov; Saidjamol Murobidinov; Ogabek Haydarov; Shokhboz Mamayusufov; Shakhzod Omonov; Yakhyo Muhamadiev; Asadbek Juraev	Đinh Văn Duy; Trinh Duy Phúc; Dương Văn Tiên; Trần Minh Đức; Tăng Ngọc Hiếu; Trần Duy Tuyến; Trương Thế Khải; Đinh Văn Phương; Nguyễn Ngọc Thuân; Trần Hoài Phương; Cao Đức Hoàng; Bùi Xuân Tiến

== Preliminary round ==
- All times are Japan Standard Time (UTC+09:00).

=== Pool A ===
- Venue: Okazaki Central Park General Gymnasium

Pos	Team	Pld	W	L	Pts	SW	SL	SR	SPW	SPL	SPR	Qualification
1	Japan (H)	3	3	0	9	9	0	MAX	229	173	1.324	Quarterfinals
2	Pakistan	3	2	1	6	6	4	1.500	236	218	1.083	Quarterfinals
3	Kazakhstan	3	1	2	3	4	7	0.571	221	253	0.874	Classification 9th–16th
4	Uzbekistan	3	0	3	0	1	9	0.111	196	238	0.824	Classification 9th–16th

Source: asiangames2026.org
Rules for classification: Tiebreakers
(H) Host

Date	Time		Score		Set 1	Set 2	Set 3	Set 4	Set 5	Total	Attd	Report
27 Sep	13:00	Pakistan	3–1	Kazakhstan	25–16	25–22	17–25	25–20		92–83	1,028	P2 Report
27 Sep	19:30	Japan	3–0	Uzbekistan	25–17	25–20	25–17			75–54	2,353	P2 Report
28 Sep	13:45	Pakistan	3–0	Uzbekistan	25–18	25–18	25–20			75–56	873	P2 Report
28 Sep	19:20	Kazakhstan	0–3	Japan	16–25	14–25	20–25			50–75	2,315	P2 Report
29 Sep	13:00	Uzbekistan	1–3	Kazakhstan	25–13	22–25	22–25	17–25		86–88	809	P2 Report
29 Sep	19:20	Japan	3–0	Pakistan	29–27	25–20	25–22			79–69	2,337	P2 Report

=== Pool B ===
- Venue: Okazaki Central Park General Gymnasium

Pos	Team	Pld	W	L	Pts	SW	SL	SR	SPW	SPL	SPR	Qualification
1	Iran	3	3	0	8	9	2	4.500	260	203	1.281	Quarterfinals
2	Thailand	3	2	1	5	6	5	1.200	244	246	0.992	Quarterfinals
3	Indonesia	3	1	2	5	7	6	1.167	301	289	1.042	Classification 9th–16th
4	Kyrgyzstan	3	0	3	0	0	9	0.000	160	227	0.705	Classification 9th–16th

Source: asiangames2026.org
Rules for classification: Tiebreakers

Date	Time		Score		Set 1	Set 2	Set 3	Set 4	Set 5	Total	Attd	Report
27 Sep	10:00	Iran	3–0	Kyrgyzstan	25–11	25–16	25–20			75–47	561	P2 Report
27 Sep	16:00	Indonesia	2–3	Thailand	23–25	25–20	23–25	25–23	23–25	119–118	1,803	P2 Report
28 Sep	10:00	Indonesia	3–0	Kyrgyzstan	27–25	25–21	25–15			77–61	420	P2 Report
28 Sep	16:00	Thailand	0–3	Iran	18–25	18–25	15–25			51–75	1,535	P2 Report
29 Sep	10:00	Kyrgyzstan	0–3	Thailand	20–25	18–25	14–25			52–75	398	P2 Report
29 Sep	16:00	Iran	3–2	Indonesia	22–25	21–25	25–21	25–19	17–15	110–105	1,625	P2 Report

=== Pool C ===
- Venue: Park Arena Komaki

Pos	Team	Pld	W	L	Pts	SW	SL	SR	SPW	SPL	SPR	Qualification
1	India	3	3	0	8	9	2	4.500	275	246	1.118	Quarterfinals
2	Qatar	3	2	1	7	8	4	2.000	297	280	1.061	Quarterfinals
3	Vietnam	3	1	2	3	3	7	0.429	230	238	0.966	Classification 9th–16th
4	Hong Kong	3	0	3	0	2	9	0.222	234	272	0.860	Classification 9th–16th

Source: asiangames2026.org
Rules for classification: Tiebreakers

Date	Time		Score		Set 1	Set 2	Set 3	Set 4	Set 5	Total	Attd	Report
27 Sep	10:00	Qatar	3–1	Hong Kong	25–20	24–26	25–20	25–21		99–87	824	P2 Report
27 Sep	16:00	India	3–0	Vietnam	25–23	25–21	25–20			75–64	847	P2 Report
28 Sep	10:00	India	3–0	Hong Kong	25–22	25–19	25–21			75–62	929	P2 Report
28 Sep	16:00	Vietnam	0–3	Qatar	23–25	26–28	19–25			68–78	722	P2 Report
29 Sep	10:00	Hong Kong	1–3	Vietnam	20–25	20–25	25–23	20–25		85–98	603	P2 Report
29 Sep	16:00	Qatar	2–3	India	28–26	27–25	23–25	20–25	22–24	120–125	685	P2 Report

=== Pool D ===
- Venue: Park Arena Komaki

Pos	Team	Pld	W	L	Pts	SW	SL	SR	SPW	SPL	SPR	Qualification
1	China	3	3	0	7	9	4	2.250	298	276	1.080	Quarterfinals
2	South Korea	3	2	1	7	8	4	2.000	284	249	1.141	Quarterfinals
3	Chinese Taipei	3	1	2	4	6	7	0.857	279	299	0.933	Classification 9th–16th
4	Philippines	3	0	3	0	1	9	0.111	215	252	0.853	Classification 9th–16th

Source: asiangames2026.org
Rules for classification: Tiebreakers

Date	Time		Score		Set 1	Set 2	Set 3	Set 4	Set 5	Total	Attd	Report
27 Sep	13:00	South Korea	3–0	Philippines	25–16	27–25	25–22			77–63	1,089	P2 Report
27 Sep	19:00	China	3–2	Chinese Taipei	25–18	26–28	20–25	25–21	15–13	111–105	654	P2 Report
28 Sep	13:00	China	3–0	Philippines	25–21	25–20	25–22			75–63	854	P2 Report
28 Sep	19:00	Chinese Taipei	1–3	South Korea	26–24	10–25	15–25	23–25		74–99	685	P2 Report
29 Sep	13:00	Philippines	1–3	Chinese Taipei	25–21	20–25	17–25	27–29		89–100	788	P2 Report
29 Sep	20:00	South Korea	2–3	China	27–25	23–25	21–25	25–22	12–15	108–112	692	P2 Report

== Classification round ==
- All times are Japan Standard Time (UTC+09:00).
- Venue: Park Arena Komaki

13th place match
3 October
Kyrgyzstan	0
Philippines	3 (w/o)
15th place match
3 October
Hong Kong	0
Uzbekistan	3

Classification 13th–16th
2 October
Hong Kong	1
Kyrgyzstan	3
2 October
Uzbekistan	1
Philippines	3

Classification 9th–16th
1 October
Kazakhstan	3
Hong Kong	2
1 October
Kyrgyzstan	0
Chinese Taipei	3
1 October
Vietnam	3
Uzbekistan	0
1 October
Philippines	1
Indonesia	3

Classification 9th–12th
2 October
Kazakhstan	1
Chinese Taipei	3
2 October
Vietnam	3
Indonesia	1

9th place match
3 October
Chinese Taipei	3
Vietnam	1
11th place match
3 October
Kazakhstan	3
Indonesia	1

=== Classification 9th–16th ===
Date	Time		Score		Set 1	Set 2	Set 3	Set 4	Set 5	Total	Attd	Report
1 Oct	10:00	Kazakhstan	3–2	Hong Kong	22–25	24–26	25–20	26–24	15–11	112–106	1,432	P2 Report
1 Oct	13:20	Kyrgyzstan	0–3	Chinese Taipei	18–25	24–26	21–25			63–76	662	P2 Report
1 Oct	16:00	Vietnam	3–0	Uzbekistan	25–22	25–20	25–15			75–57	588	P2 Report
1 Oct	19:00	Philippines	1–3	Indonesia	23–25	26–24	22–25	21–25		92–99	428	P2 Report

=== Classification 13th–16th ===
Date	Time		Score		Set 1	Set 2	Set 3	Set 4	Set 5	Total	Attd	Report
2 Oct	10:00	Hong Kong	1–3	Kyrgyzstan	25–13	24–26	25–27	23–25		97–91	937	P2 Report
2 Oct	13:00	Uzbekistan	1–3	Philippines	19–25	15–25	25–23	17–25		76–98	843	P2 Report

=== Classification 9th–12th ===
Date	Time		Score		Set 1	Set 2	Set 3	Set 4	Set 5	Total	Attd	Report
2 Oct	16:00	Kazakhstan	1–3	Chinese Taipei	11–25	25–23	21–25	20–25		77–98	751	P2 Report
2 Oct	19:00	Vietnam	3–1	Indonesia	25–19	25–23	21–25	25–22		96–89	577	P2 Report

=== 15th place match ===
Date	Time		Score		Set 1	Set 2	Set 3	Set 4	Set 5	Total	Attd	Report
3 Oct	10:00	Hong Kong	0–3	Uzbekistan	29–31	22–25	22–25			73–81	904	P2 Report

=== 13th place match ===
- AINAGOC announced that the Philippines secured a 13th-place finish after Kyrgyzstan forfeited their classification match via a 3-0 default.

Date	Time		Score		Set 1	Set 2	Set 3	Set 4	Set 5	Total	Attd	Report
3 Oct	13:00	Kyrgyzstan	0–3	Philippines	0–25	0–25	0–25			0–75	0	P2 Report

=== 11th place match ===
Date	Time		Score		Set 1	Set 2	Set 3	Set 4	Set 5	Total	Attd	Report
3 Oct	16:00	Kazakhstan	3–1	Indonesia	23–25	25–23	25–18	25–20		98–86	794	P2 Report

=== 9th place match ===
Date	Time		Score		Set 1	Set 2	Set 3	Set 4	Set 5	Total	Attd	Report
3 Oct	19:00	Chinese Taipei	3–1	Vietnam	25–16	26–28	25–17	25–14		101–75	648	P2 Report

== Final round ==
- All times are Japan Standard Time (UTC+09:00).
- Venue: Okazaki Central Park General Gymnasium

5th place match
3 October
Thailand	3
India	2
7th place match
2 October
Qatar	0
South Korea	3

Classification 5th–8th
2 October
Qatar	1
Thailand	3
2 October
India	3
South Korea	1

Quarterfinals
1 October
Japan	3
Qatar	0
1 October
Thailand	0
China	3
1 October
India	0
Pakistan	3
1 October
South Korea	2
Iran	3

Semifinals
2 October
Japan	3
China	2
2 October
Pakistan	0
Iran	3

Gold medal match
3 October
Japan	1
Iran	3
Bronze medal match
3 October
China	0
Pakistan	3

=== Quarterfinals ===
Date	Time		Score		Set 1	Set 2	Set 3	Set 4	Set 5	Total	Attd	Report
1 Oct	10:00	India	0–3	Pakistan	19–25	23–25	18–25			60–75	578	P2 Report
1 Oct	13:00	South Korea	2–3	Iran	23–25	25–18	25–21	20–25	12–15	105–104	1,101	P2 Report
1 Oct	16:05	Thailand	0–3	China	23–25	23–25	19–25			65–75	1,816	P2 Report
1 Oct	19:20	Japan	3–0	Qatar	25–14	25–13	25–12			75–39	2,338	P2 Report

=== Classification 5th–8th ===
Date	Time		Score		Set 1	Set 2	Set 3	Set 4	Set 5	Total	Attd	Report
2 Oct	10:00	India	3–1	South Korea	25–16	25–20	23–25	25–23		98–84	609	P2 Report
2 Oct	13:00	Qatar	1–3	Thailand	20–25	19–25	25–21	21–25		85–96	1,041	P2 Report

=== Semifinals ===
Date	Time		Score		Set 1	Set 2	Set 3	Set 4	Set 5	Total	Attd	Report
2 Oct	16:00	Pakistan	0–3	Iran	13–25	15–25	11–25			39–75	1,711	P2 Report
2 Oct	19:20	Japan	3–2	China	23–25	25–22	25–18	19–25	15–13	107–103	2,282	P2 Report

=== 7th place match ===
Date	Time		Score		Set 1	Set 2	Set 3	Set 4	Set 5	Total	Attd	Report
3 Oct	10:00	Qatar	0–3	South Korea	20–25	23–25	16–25			59–75	748	P2 Report

=== 5th place match ===
Date	Time		Score		Set 1	Set 2	Set 3	Set 4	Set 5	Total	Attd	Report
3 Oct	13:00	Thailand	3–2	India	25–19	17–25	25–21	17–25	17–15	101–105	1,099	P2 Report

=== Bronze medal match ===
Date	Time		Score		Set 1	Set 2	Set 3	Set 4	Set 5	Total	Attd	Report
3 Oct	16:05	China	0–3	Pakistan	18–25	16–25	18–25			52–75	1,932	P2 Report

=== Gold medal match ===
Date	Time		Score		Set 1	Set 2	Set 3	Set 4	Set 5	Total	Attd	Report
3 Oct	19:20	Japan	1–3	Iran	26–28	25–19	21–25	24–26		96–98	2,604	P2 Report

== Final standing ==
Rank	Team	Pld	W	L
1st place, gold medalist(s)	Iran	6	6	0
2nd place, silver medalist(s)	Japan	6	5	1
3rd place, bronze medalist(s)	Pakistan	6	4	2
4	China	6	4	2
5	Thailand	6	4	2
6	India	6	4	2
7	South Korea	6	3	3
8	Qatar	6	2	4
9	Chinese Taipei	6	4	2
10	Vietnam	6	3	3
11	Kazakhstan	6	3	3
12	Indonesia	6	2	4
13	Philippines	6	2	4
14	Kyrgyzstan	6	1	5
15	Uzbekistan	6	1	5
16	Hong Kong	6	0	6

== See also ==
- Volleyball at the Asian Games
- Volleyball at the 2026 Asian Games – Women's tournament
