= Volleyball at the 2026 Asian Games – Women's tournament =

Women's volleyball at the 2026 Asian Games
- Venue: Okazaki Central Park General Gymnasium; Park Arena Komaki
- Date: 16–22 September 2026
- Competitors: 168 from 14 nations

Medalists
gold medal	China
silver medal	Japan
bronze medal	Thailand

The women's tournament in volleyball at the 2026 Asian Games was the 20th edition of the event at the Asian Games, organised by Asian Volleyball Confederation in conjunction with the Olympic Council of Asia. It was held in Okazaki and Komaki, Aichi Prefecture, Japan from 16–22 September 2026.

== Schedule ==
The schedule is as follows:

P	Preliminary round	C	Classification	¼	Quarterfinals	½	Semifinals	F	Finals

Sep 16	Sep 17	Sep 18	Sep 19	Sep 20		Sep 21		Sep 22	
P	P	P	—N/a	C	¼	C	½	C	F

== Draw ==
=== Seeding ===
Seeded teams	Pot 3	Pot 4
Japan (Hosts; 6); China (7); Thailand (13); South Korea (28); Vietnam (32); Chinese Taipei (37); Kazakhstan (42); Indonesia (53)	Philippines (56); Nepal (69); Qatar (106); Kyrgyzstan (117)	Hong Kong (126); Mongolia (129)

=== Pools composition ===
Pool A	Pool B	Pool C	Pool D
Japan	China	Thailand	South Korea
Indonesia	Kazakhstan	Chinese Taipei	Vietnam
Nepal	Philippines	Kyrgyzstan	Qatar
—N/a	—N/a	Mongolia	Hong Kong

== Pool standing procedure ==
To establish the ranking of teams after the preliminary round, the following criteria were implemented:

1. Total number of victories (matches won, matches lost)
2. In the event of a tie, the following first tiebreaker will apply: The teams will be ranked by the most point gained per match as follows:
  - Match won 3–0 or 3–1: 3 points for the winner, 0 points for the loser
  - Match won 3–2: 2 points for the winner, 1 point for the loser
  - Match forfeited: 3 points for the winner, 0 points (0–25, 0–25, 0–25) for the loser
3. If teams are still tied after examining the number of victories and points gained, then the AVC will examine the results in order to break the tie in the following order:
  - Set quotient: if two or more teams are tied on the number of points gained, they will be ranked by the quotient resulting from the division of the number of all set won by the number of all sets lost.
  - Points quotient: if the tie persists based on the set quotient, the teams will be ranked by the quotient resulting from the division of all points scored by the total of points lost during all sets.
  - If the tie persists based on the point quotient, the tie will be broken based on the team that won the match of the Round Robin Phase between the tied teams. When the tie in point quotient is between three or more teams, these teams ranked taking into consideration only the matches involving the teams in question.

== Rosters ==
China	Chinese Taipei	Hong Kong	Indonesia
Wu Mengjie; Zhuang Yushan; Tang Xin; Zhang Zixuan; Gong Xiangyu; Chen Houyu; Wang Aoqian; Yang Shuming; Dong Yuhan; Xie Shengyu; Guo Zhongnan; Wang Mengjie	Hsu Heng-yun; Xu Zhen-xuan; Hung Chia-yao; Lin Shu-ho; Kan Ko-hui; Hsu Wan-yun; Tsai Yu-chun; Liao Yi-jen; Chen Chieh; Wen Yi-chin; Wu Tzu-hua; Chang Yi-chi	Halimah Zampaligre Wilson; Michelle Cheung; Chim Wing Lam; Fong Ka Yi; Lee Kit Sum; Leung Nga Yee; Shum Lam; Suen Yee Tung; Tang Sum Yuen; Wong Wan Wun; Yim Wing Ni; Yu Ying Chi	Maradanti Namira Tegariani; Tina Syifa Sabila Salim; Chelsa Berliana Nurtomo; Mediol Stiovanny Yoku; Putri Nur Agustin; Indah Guretno Margiani; Ersandrina Devega; Ajeng Nur Cahaya; Geofanny Eka Cahyaningtyas; Azzahra Dwi Febyane; Khanza Putri Yansi; Arneta Putri Amelian
Japan	Kazakhstan	Kyrgyzstan	Mongolia
Yukiko Wada; Yoshino Sato; Nanami Seki; Nichika Yamada; Maki Yamaguchi; Hitomi Shiode; Hinata Shigihara; Mana Nishizaki; Ai Hirota; Ayane Kitamado; Miina Inoue; Miku Akimoto	Perizat Nurbergenova; Natalya Khazova; Yuliya Fomenko; Polina Ufimtseva; Margarita Belchenko; Kristina Belova; Zhanna Syroyeshkina; Madina Beket; Tatyana Nikitina; Aigul Mulkibayeva; Tatyana Yatskiv; Irina Kuznetsova		
Nepal	Philippines	Qatar	South Korea
Niruta Thagunna; Salina Shrestha; Usha Bhandari; Sumitra Regmi; Pragati Nath; Mina Sunar; Salina Buddha Magar; Laxmi Chand; Sunita Khatri; Roma Kunwar; Aarati Subedi; Basanti Saud	Shaina Nitura; Bella Belen; Eya Laure; Jia de Guzman; Angel Canino; Dell Palomata; Alyssa Solomon; Amie Provido; Thea Gagate; Mars Alba; Justine Jazareno; Niña Ytang	Dana Aboueita; Ludan Elwaleed M Eisa; Aisha Al Alawi; Penda Fatma Gadiaga; Janna Mabrouk; Meriem Mouhoub; Tasneem Ali; Sumaia Almadhoun; Almayasa Deyab; Lamis Alsalman; Nelly Shalaby; Lujain Mahmoud	Lee Ye-lim; Kim Da-in; Han Da-hye; Park Eun-jin; Na Hyun-soo; Yuk Seo-young; Lee Da-hyeon; Park Eun-seo; Jung Ho-young; Lee Su-yeon; Kim Hyo-im; Kang So-hwi
Thailand	Vietnam		
Piyanut Pannoy; Pornpun Guedpard; Kanyarat Kunmuang; Thatdao Nuekjang; Warisara Seetaloed; Kalyarat Khamwong; Sasipaporn Janthawisut; Natthanicha Jaisaen; Pimpichaya Kokram; Ajcharaporn Kongyot; Chatchu-on Moksri; Kaewkalaya Kamulthala	Nguyễn Thị Trà My; Trần Thị Thanh Thúy; Bùi Thị Ánh Thảo; Phạm Quỳnh Hương; Lê Thanh Thúy; Vi Thị Yến Nhi; Lê Như Anh; Nguyễn Khánh Đang; Võ Thị Kim Thoa; Lưu Thị Huệ; Lê Thị Yến; Trần Thị Bích Thủy		

== Preliminary round ==
- All times are Japan Standard Time (UTC+09:00).

=== Pool A ===
- Venue: Park Arena Komaki

Pos	Team	Pld	W	L	Pts	SW	SL	SR	SPW	SPL	SPR	Qualification
1	Japan (H)	2	2	0	6	6	1	6.000	173	111	1.559	Quarterfinals
2	Indonesia	2	1	1	3	4	3	1.333	155	151	1.026	Quarterfinals
3	Nepal	2	0	2	0	0	6	0.000	84	150	0.560	Classification 9th–14th

Source: asiangames2026.org
Rules for classification: Tiebreakers
(H) Host

Date	Time		Score		Set 1	Set 2	Set 3	Set 4	Set 5	Total	Attd	Report
16 Sep	19:20	Japan	3–0	Nepal	25–8	25–12	25–11			75–31	1,780	P2 Report
17 Sep	19:20	Indonesia	3–0	Nepal	25–12	25–21	25–20			75–53	550	P2 Report
18 Sep	19:20	Indonesia	1–3	Japan	19–25	13–25	25–23	23–25		80–98	1,583	P2 Report

=== Pool B ===
- Venue: Okazaki Central Park General Gymnasium

Pos	Team	Pld	W	L	Pts	SW	SL	SR	SPW	SPL	SPR	Qualification
1	China	2	2	0	6	6	0	MAX	150	86	1.744	Quarterfinals
2	Kazakhstan	2	1	1	3	3	4	0.750	141	170	0.829	Quarterfinals
3	Philippines	2	0	2	0	1	6	0.167	143	178	0.803	Classification 9th–14th

Source: asiangames2026.org
Rules for classification: Tiebreakers

Date	Time		Score		Set 1	Set 2	Set 3	Set 4	Set 5	Total	Attd	Report
16 Sep	13:00	China	3–0	Philippines	25–18	25–22	25–8			75–48	1,300	P2 Report
17 Sep	13:00	Kazakhstan	3–1	Philippines	27–29	26–24	25–23	25–19		103–95	1,000	P2 Report
18 Sep	13:00	Kazakhstan	0–3	China	18–25	6–25	14–25			38–75	1,300	P2 Report

=== Pool C ===
- Venue: Okazaki Central Park General Gymnasium

Pos	Team	Pld	W	L	Pts	SW	SL	SR	SPW	SPL	SPR	Qualification
1	Thailand	3	3	0	9	9	0	MAX	225	139	1.619	Quarterfinals
2	Chinese Taipei	3	2	1	6	6	3	2.000	214	157	1.363	Quarterfinals
3	Mongolia	3	1	2	3	3	6	0.500	167	198	0.843	Classification 9th–12th
4	Kyrgyzstan	3	0	3	0	0	9	0.000	113	225	0.502	Classification 9th–14th

Source: asiangames2026.org
Rules for classification: Tiebreakers

Date	Time		Score		Set 1	Set 2	Set 3	Set 4	Set 5	Total	Attd	Report
16 Sep	16:00	Thailand	3–0	Mongolia	25–12	25–18	25–18			75–48	1,350	P2 Report
16 Sep	19:00	Chinese Taipei	3–0	Kyrgyzstan	25–14	25–15	25–9			75–38	600	P2 Report
17 Sep	16:00	Chinese Taipei	3–0	Mongolia	25–22	25–8	25–14			75–44	900	P2 Report
17 Sep	19:00	Kyrgyzstan	0–3	Thailand	13–25	7–25	7–25			27–75	750	P2 Report
18 Sep	16:00	Mongolia	3–0	Kyrgyzstan	25–20	25–13	25–15			75–48	920	P2 Report
18 Sep	19:00	Chinese Taipei	0–3	Thailand	22–25	22–25	20–25			64–75	1,100	P2 Report

=== Pool D ===
- Venue: Park Arena Komaki

Pos	Team	Pld	W	L	Pts	SW	SL	SR	SPW	SPL	SPR	Qualification
1	South Korea	3	3	0	9	9	1	9.000	251	157	1.599	Quarterfinals
2	Vietnam	3	2	1	6	7	3	2.333	238	176	1.352	Quarterfinals
3	Hong Kong	3	1	2	3	3	6	0.500	177	179	0.989	Classification 9th–12th
4	Qatar	3	0	3	0	0	9	0.000	71	225	0.316	Classification 9th–14th

Source: asiangames2026.org
Rules for classification: Tiebreakers

Date	Time		Score		Set 1	Set 2	Set 3	Set 4	Set 5	Total	Attd	Report
16 Sep	13:00	Vietnam	3–0	Qatar	25–3	25–8	25–9			75–20	634	P2 Report
16 Sep	16:00	South Korea	3–0	Hong Kong	25–23	25–12	25–12			75–47	1,420	P2 Report
17 Sep	13:00	South Korea	3–0	Qatar	25–6	25–6	25–10			75–22	1,082	P2 Report
17 Sep	16:00	Hong Kong	0–3	Vietnam	22–25	15–25	18–25			55–75	1,340	P2 Report
18 Sep	13:00	Qatar	0–3	Hong Kong	9–25	8–25	12–25			29–75	731	P2 Report
18 Sep	16:00	Vietnam	1–3	South Korea	21–25	21–25	28–26	18–25		88–101	1,125	P2 Report

== Classification round ==
- All times are Japan Standard Time (UTC+09:00).
- Venue: Okazaki Central Park General Gymnasium

Classification 9th–14th
Nepal	3
Kyrgyzstan	0
Philippines	3
Qatar	0

Classification 9th–12th
Nepal	0
Hong Kong	3
Philippines	3
Mongolia	0

9th place match
Hong Kong	0
Philippines	3
11th place match
Nepal	0
Mongolia	3

13th place match
Kyrgyzstan	3
Qatar	0

=== Classification 9th–14th ===
Date	Time		Score		Set 1	Set 2	Set 3	Set 4	Set 5	Total	Attd	Report
20 Sep	16:00	Nepal	3–0	Kyrgyzstan	25–20	25–16	25–20			75–56	1,720	P2 Report
20 Sep	19:00	Philippines	3–0	Qatar	25–8	25–2	25–9			75–19	1,180	P2 Report

=== Classification 9th–12th ===
Date	Time		Score		Set 1	Set 2	Set 3	Set 4	Set 5	Total	Attd	Report
21 Sep	16:00	Nepal	0–3	Hong Kong	20–25	19–25	26–28			65–78	1,455	P2 Report
21 Sep	19:00	Philippines	3–0	Mongolia	25–13	25–11	25–20			75–44	660	P2 Report

=== 13th place match ===
Date	Time		Score		Set 1	Set 2	Set 3	Set 4	Set 5	Total	Attd	Report
22 Sep	13:00	Kyrgyzstan	3–0	Qatar	25–13	25–18	25–3			75–34	1,213	P2 Report

=== 11th place match ===
Date	Time		Score		Set 1	Set 2	Set 3	Set 4	Set 5	Total	Attd	Report
22 Sep	16:00	Nepal	0–3	Mongolia	23–25	17–25	13–25			53–75	977	P2 Report

=== 9th place match ===
Date	Time		Score		Set 1	Set 2	Set 3	Set 4	Set 5	Total	Attd	Report
22 Sep	19:00	Hong Kong	0–3	Philippines	21–25	9–25	28–30			58–80	569	P2 Report

== Final round ==
- All times are Japan Standard Time (UTC+09:00).
- Venues: Park Arena Komaki and Okazaki Central Park General Gymnasium

5th place match
22 September – Komaki
Chinese Taipei	3
Indonesia	0
7th place match
22 September – Komaki
Kazakhstan	0
Vietnam	3

Classification 5th–8th
21 September – Komaki
Chinese Taipei	3
Kazakhstan	2
21 September – Okazaki
Indonesia	3
Vietnam	0

Quarterfinals
20 September – Komaki
Japan	3
Chinese Taipei	0
20 September – Komaki
Kazakhstan	0
South Korea	3
20 September – Komaki
Thailand	3
Indonesia	0
20 September – Komaki
Vietnam	0
China	3

Semifinals
21 September – Komaki
Japan	3
South Korea	0
21 September – Komaki
Thailand	2
China	3

Gold medal match
22 September – Komaki
Japan	0
China	3
Bronze medal match
22 September – Komaki
South Korea	0
Thailand	3

=== Quarterfinals ===
Date	Time		Score		Set 1	Set 2	Set 3	Set 4	Set 5	Total	Attd	Report
20 Sep	10:00	Thailand	3–0	Indonesia	25–10	29–27	25–16			79–53	648	P2 Report
20 Sep	13:00	Vietnam	0–3	China	16–25	16–25	11–25			43–75	846	P2 Report
20 Sep	16:00	Kazakhstan	0–3	South Korea	24–26	25–27	21–25			70–78	1,494	P2 Report
20 Sep	19:20	Japan	3–0	Chinese Taipei	25–12	25–16	25–19			75–47	1,707	P2 Report

=== Classification 5th–8th ===
Date	Time		Score		Set 1	Set 2	Set 3	Set 4	Set 5	Total	Attd	Report
21 Sep	13:30	Chinese Taipei	3–2	Kazakhstan	25–21	25–23	22–25	25–27	15–10	112–106	875	P2 Report
21 Sep	13:30	Indonesia	3–0	Vietnam	25–20	25–21	25–18			75–59	1,622	P2 Report

=== Semifinals ===
Date	Time		Score		Set 1	Set 2	Set 3	Set 4	Set 5	Total	Attd	Report
21 Sep	16:45	Thailand	2–3	China	25–23	21–25	11–25	28–26	6–15	91–114	1,549	P2 Report
21 Sep	20:10	Japan	3–0	South Korea	25–20	25–22	25–16			75–58	1,715	P2 Report

=== 7th place match ===
Date	Time		Score		Set 1	Set 2	Set 3	Set 4	Set 5	Total	Attd	Report
22 Sep	10:00	Kazakhstan	0–3	Vietnam	21–25	19–25	15–25			55–75	452	P2 Report

=== 5th place match ===
Date	Time		Score		Set 1	Set 2	Set 3	Set 4	Set 5	Total	Attd	Report
22 Sep	13:00	Chinese Taipei	3–0	Indonesia	25–15	25–20	25–11			75–46	800	P2 Report

=== Bronze medal match ===
Date	Time		Score		Set 1	Set 2	Set 3	Set 4	Set 5	Total	Attd	Report
22 Sep	16:00	South Korea	0–3	Thailand	20–25	19–25	23–25			62–75	1,388	P2 Report

=== Gold medal match ===
Date	Time		Score		Set 1	Set 2	Set 3	Set 4	Set 5	Total	Attd	Report
22 Sep	19:20	Japan	0–3	China	19–25	20–25	23–25			62–75	1,767	P2 Report

== Final standing ==
Rank	Team	Pld	W	L
1st place, gold medalist(s)	China	5	5	0
2nd place, silver medalist(s)	Japan	5	4	1
3rd place, bronze medalist(s)	Thailand	6	5	1
4	South Korea	6	4	2
5	Chinese Taipei	6	4	2
6	Indonesia	5	2	3
7	Vietnam	6	3	3
8	Kazakhstan	5	1	4
9	Philippines	5	3	2
10	Hong Kong	5	2	3
11	Mongolia	5	2	3
12	Nepal	5	1	4
13	Kyrgyzstan	5	1	4
14	Qatar	5	0	5

== See also ==
- Volleyball at the Asian Games
- Volleyball at the 2026 Asian Games – Men's tournament
