= 2025 Rally Japan =

10th edition of the Rally Japan

2025 Rally Japan FORUM8 Rally Japan 2025
Round 13 of 14 in the 2025 World Rally Championship
← Previous event	Next event →
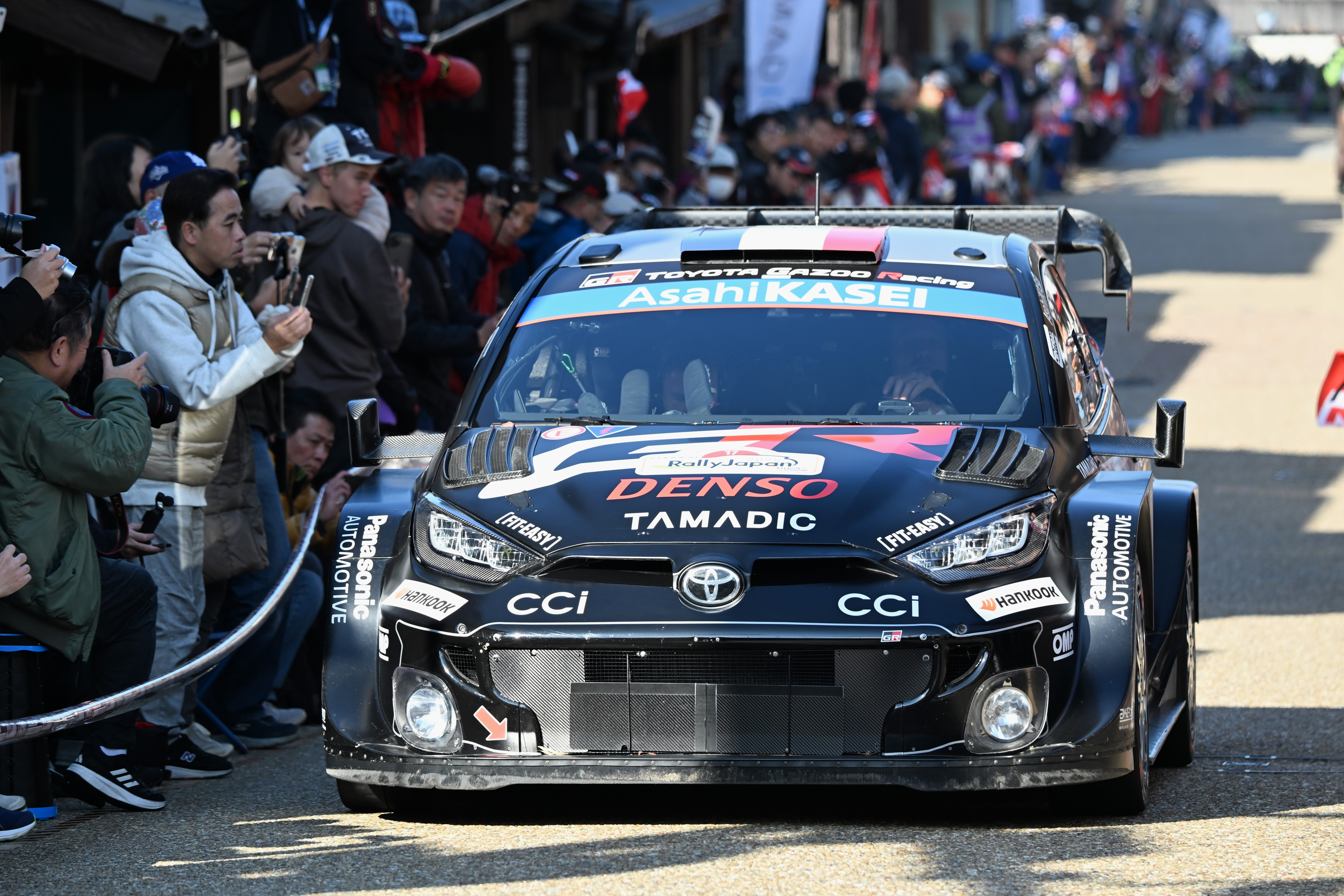
- Rally winners Sébastien Ogier and Vincent Landais driving a Toyota GR Yaris Rally1 during the rally.
- Host country: Japan
- Rally base: Toyota, Aichi Prefecture
- Dates run: 6 – 9 November 2025
- Start location: Toyota Stadium, Toyota
- Finish location: Toyota Stadium, Toyota
- Stages: 20 (305.34 km; 189.73 miles)
- Stage surface: Tarmac
- Transport distance: 617.67 km (383.80 miles)
- Overall distance: 923.01 km (573.53 miles)

Statistics
- Crews registered: 38
- Crews: 37 at start, 26 at finish

Overall results
- Overall winner: (France) Sébastien Ogier (France) Vincent Landais (Japan) Toyota Gazoo Racing WRT; 3:21:08.9
- Sunday Accumulated leader: (France) Sébastien Ogier (France) Vincent Landais (Japan) Toyota Gazoo Racing WRT; 48:13.9
- Power Stage winner: (France) Sébastien Ogier (France) Vincent Landais (Japan) Toyota Gazoo Racing WRT; 9:29.3

Support category results
- WRC-2 winner: (Spain) Alejandro Cachón (Spain) Borja Rozada (Spain) Toyota España; 3:31:50.5
- WRC-3 winner: (France) Ghjuvanni Rossi (France) Kylian Sarmezan; 3:51:56.6

The 2025 Rally Japan (also known as the FORUM8 Rally Japan 2025) was a motor racing event for rally cars held over four days from 6 to 9 November 2025. It marked the tenth running of the Rally Japan, and was the thirteenth round of the 2025 World Rally Championship, 2025 WRC2 Championship and 2025 WRC3 Championship. The 2025 event was based in Nagoya in Chūbu Region and was contested over twenty special stages, covering a total competitive distance of 305.34 km (189.73 mi).

Elfyn Evans and Scott Martin were the defending rally winners, and their team, Toyota Gazoo Racing WRT, were the defending manufacturers' winners. Nikolay Gryazin and Konstantin Aleksandrov were the defending rally winners in the WRC2 category. Diego Dominguez Jr. and Rogelio Peñate were the defending rally winners in the WRC3 category.

Sébastien Ogier and Vincent Landais won the rally, and their team, Toyota Gazoo Racing WRT, were the manufacturer's winner. Alejandro Cachón and Borja Rozada were the winners in the WRC2 category, and secured their category titles. Ghjuvanni Rossi and Kylian Sarmezan were the winners in the WRC3 category, while Matteo Fontana and Alessandro Arnaboldi became the 2025 WRC3 champions.

== Background ==
=== Entry list ===
The following crews entered into the rally. The event was opened to crews competing in the World Rally Championship, its support categories, the WRC2 Championship, the WRC3 Championship and privateer entries that were not registered to score points in any championship. Ten entered under Rally1 regulations, as were fourteen Rally2 crews in the WRC2 Championship and four Rally3 crew in the WRC3 Championship.

Rally1 entries competing in the World Rally Championship
No.	Driver	Co-Driver	Entrant	Car	Championship eligibility	Tyre
1	(Belgium) Thierry Neuville	(Belgium) Martijn Wydaeghe	(South Korea) Hyundai Shell Mobis WRT	Hyundai i20 N Rally1	Driver, Co-driver, Manufacturer	H
5	(Finland) Sami Pajari	(Finland) Marko Salminen	(Japan) Toyota Gazoo Racing WRT2	Toyota GR Yaris Rally1	Driver, Co-driver, Manufacturer, Team	H
8	(Estonia) Ott Tänak	(Estonia) Martin Järveoja	(South Korea) Hyundai Shell Mobis WRT	Hyundai i20 N Rally1	Driver, Co-driver	H
13	(Luxembourg) Grégoire Munster	(Belgium) Louis Louka	(United Kingdom) M-Sport Ford WRT	Ford Puma Rally1	Driver, Co-driver, Manufacturer	H
16	(France) Adrien Fourmaux	(France) Alexandre Coria	(South Korea) Hyundai Shell Mobis WRT	Hyundai i20 N Rally1	Driver, Co-driver, Manufacturer	H
17	(France) Sébastien Ogier	(France) Vincent Landais	(Japan) Toyota Gazoo Racing WRT	Toyota GR Yaris Rally1	Driver, Co-driver, Manufacturer	H
18	(Japan) Takamoto Katsuta	(Republic of Ireland) Aaron Johnston	(Japan) Toyota Gazoo Racing WRT	Toyota GR Yaris Rally1	Driver, Co-driver	H
33	(United Kingdom) Elfyn Evans	(United Kingdom) Scott Martin	(Japan) Toyota Gazoo Racing WRT	Toyota GR Yaris Rally1	Driver, Co-driver, Manufacturer	H
55	(Republic of Ireland) Josh McErlean	(Republic of Ireland) Eoin Treacy	(United Kingdom) M-Sport Ford WRT	Ford Puma Rally1	Driver, Co-driver, Manufacturer	H
69	(Finland) Kalle Rovanperä	(Finland) Jonne Halttunen	(Japan) Toyota Gazoo Racing WRT	Toyota GR Yaris Rally1	Driver, Co-driver, Manufacturer	H

Rally2 entries competing in the WRC2 Championship
No.	Driver	Co-Driver	Entrant	Car	Championship eligibility	Tyre
21	(United Kingdom) Gus Greensmith	(Sweden) Jonas Andersson	(United Kingdom) Gus Greensmith	Škoda Fabia RS Rally2	Driver, Co-driver	H
22	(Spain) Jan Solans	(Spain) Rodrigo Sanjuan de Eusebio	(Spain) PH.Ph	Toyota GR Yaris Rally2	Challenger Driver, Challenger Co-driver	H
23	(Bulgaria) Nikolay Gryazin	(Kyrgyzstan) Konstantin Aleksandrov	(Germany) Toksport WRT	Škoda Fabia RS Rally2	Challenger Driver, Challenger Co-driver	H
24	(Spain) Alejandro Cachón	(Spain) Borja Rozada	(Spain) Toyota España	Toyota GR Yaris Rally2	Challenger Driver, Challenger Co-driver	H
25	(Japan) Yuki Yamamoto	(Republic of Ireland) James Fulton	(Japan) Toyota Gazoo Racing WRT NG	Toyota GR Yaris Rally2	Challenger Driver, Challenger Co-driver	H
26	(Paraguay) Diego Domínguez Jr.	(Spain) Rogelio Peñate	(Paraguay) Diego Domínguez Jr.	Toyota GR Yaris Rally2	Challenger Driver, Challenger Co-driver	H
27	(Japan) Hiroki Arai	(Japan) Hiroki Tachikui	(Japan) R2R×YAHAGI Racing Team	Škoda Fabia R5	Challenger Driver, Challenger Co-driver	H
28	(Finland) Heikki Kovalainen	(Japan) Sae Kitagawa	(Finland) Heikki Kovalainen	Toyota GR Yaris Rally2	Challenger Driver, Challenger Co-driver	H
29	(Japan) Norihiko Katsuta	(Japan) Yusuke Kimura	(Japan) Toyota Gazoo Racing WRJ	Toyota GR Yaris Rally2	Challenger/Masters Driver, Challenger Co-driver	H
30	(Japan) Takuma Kamada	(Japan) Yuichi Matsumoto	(Japan) Takuma Kamada	Škoda Fabia R5	Challenger/Masters Driver, Challenger Co-driver	H
31	(Japan) Fumio Nutahara	(Japan) Shungo Azuma	(Japan) Fumio Nutahara	Toyota GR Yaris Rally2	Challenger/Masters Driver, Challenger Co-driver	H
32	(Japan) Osamu Fukunaga	(Japan) Misako Saida	(Japan) Osamu Fukunaga	Škoda Fabia Rally2 evo	Challenger/Masters Driver, Challenger Co-driver	H
34	(Japan) Satoshi Imai	(Japan) Fuyu Takahashi	(Japan) Satoshi Imai	Citroën C3 Rally2	Challenger/Masters Driver, Challenger Co-driver	H

Rally3 entries competing in the WRC3 Championship
No.	Driver	Co-Driver	Entrant	Car	Class/Championship eligibility	Tyre
35	(Italy) Matteo Fontana	(Italy) Alessandro Arnaboldi	(Italy) Matteo Fontana	Ford Fiesta Rally3	WRC3	H
36	(France) Ghjuvanni Rossi	(France) Kylian Sarmezan	(France) Ghjuvanni Rossi	Ford Fiesta Rally3	WRC3	H
37	(Greece) Georgios Vasilakis	(Republic of Ireland) Allan Harryman	(Greece) Georgios Vasilakis	Ford Fiesta Rally3	WRC3, Masters Driver, Masters Co-Driver	H
38	(France) Eric Royère	(France) Alexis Grenier	(France) Eric Royère	Ford Fiesta Rally3	WRC3	H

Other major entries
No.	Driver	Co-Driver	Entrant	Car	Championship eligibility	Tyre
20	(Sweden) Oliver Solberg	(United Kingdom) Elliott Edmondson	(Finland) Printsport	Toyota GR Yaris Rally2	—N/a	H
40	(Belgium) Armand Fumal	(France) Jules Escartefigue	(Belgium) Armand Fumal	Alpine A110 Rally RGT	Masters Driver	H

=== Itinerary ===
All dates and times are JST (UTC+9).

Date	No.	Time span	Stage name	Distance
6 November	—	After 9:01	Kuragaike Park [Shakedown]	2.75 km
6 November		After 15:30	Opening ceremony, Toyota Stadium	—N/a
6 November	SS1	After 16:05	Kuragaike Park SSS	2.75 km
7 November		5:43 – 5:58	Service A, Toyota Stadium	—N/a
7 November	SS2	After 7:11	Inabu / Shitara 1	17.08 km
7 November	SS3	After 8:24	Shinshiro 1	17.41 km
7 November	SS4	After 9:57	Isegami's Tunnel 1	19.66 km
7 November		11:37 – 11:57	Regroup, Toyota Stadium	—N/a
7 November		11:57 – 12:37	Service B, Toyota Stadium	—N/a
7 November	SS5	After 13:40	Isegami's Tunnel 2	19.66 km
7 November	SS6	After 15:03	Inabu / Shitara 2	17.08 km
7 November	SS7	After 16:16	Shinshiro 2	17.41 km
7 November		18:06 – 18:51	Flexi service C, Toyota Stadium	—N/a
8 November		5:55 – 6:10	Service D, Toyota Stadium	—N/a
8 November	SS8	After 7:23	Obara 1	16.44 km
8 November	SS9	After 8:34	Ena 1	21.25 km
8 November	SS10	After 10:05	Mt. Kasagi 1	21.74 km
8 November		10:55 – 11:54	Regroup, Enakyo Park	—N/a
8 November	SS11	After 12:35	Mt. Kasagi 2	21.74 km
8 November	SS12	After 14:08	Ena 2	21.25 km
8 November	SS13	After 15:21	Obara 2	16.44 km
8 November		16:36 – 17:32	Regroup, SkyHall	—N/a
8 November	SS14	After 17:35	Toyota City SSS	3.05 km
8 November		18:10 – 18:55	Flexi service E, Toyota Stadium	—N/a
9 November		7:26 – 7:41	Service F, Toyota Stadium	—N/a
9 November	SS15	After 8:39	Nukata 1	20.23 km
9 November	SS16	After 9:35	Lake Mikawako 1	13.98 km
9 November		12:07 – 12:27	Regroup, Okazaki Central Park General Gymnasium	—N/a
9 November	SS17	After 10:53	Okazaki SSS 1	1.98 km
9 November	SS18	After 11:04	Okazaki SSS 2	1.98 km
9 November		11:22 – 11:47	Regroup, Okazaki Central Park General Gymnasium	—N/a
9 November	SS19	After 12:33	Nukata 2	20.23 km
9 November		13:23 – 14:10	Regroup, Mikawako Enchi	—N/a
9 November	SS20	After 14:15	Lake Mikawako 2 [Power Stage]	13.98 km
9 November		After 15:45	Official finish, Toyota Stadium	—N/a

== Report ==
=== WRC Rally1 ===
==== Classification ====
Position		No.	Driver	Co-driver	Entrant	Car	Time	Difference	Points			
Event	Class	No.	Driver	Co-driver	Entrant	Car	Time	Difference	Event	Sunday	Stage	Total
1	1	17	Sébastien Ogier	Vincent Landais	Toyota Gazoo Racing WRT	Toyota GR Yaris Rally1	3:21:08.9	0.0	25	5	5	35
2	2	33	Elfyn Evans	Scott Martin	Toyota Gazoo Racing WRT	Toyota GR Yaris Rally1	3:21:20.5	+11.6	17	4	4	25
3	3	5	Sami Pajari	Marko Salminen	Toyota Gazoo Racing WRT2	Toyota GR Yaris Rally1	3:23:25.5	+2:16.6	15	0	0	15
4	4	10	Ott Tänak	Martin Järveoja	Hyundai Shell Mobis WRT	Hyundai i20 N Rally1	3:24:27.0	+3:18.1	12	2	2	16
5	5	13	Grégoire Munster	Louis Louka	M-Sport Ford WRT	Ford Puma Rally1	3:27:57.6	+6:48.7	10	0	1	11
6	6	69	Kalle Rovanperä	Jonne Halttunen	Toyota Gazoo Racing WRT	Toyota GR Yaris Rally1	3:28:10.4	+7:01.5	8	3	3	14
14	7	18	Takamoto Katsuta	Aaron Johnston	Toyota Gazoo Racing WRT	Toyota GR Yaris Rally1	4:01:33.5	+40:24.6	0	1	0	1
Retired SS16		16	Adrien Fourmaux	Alexandre Coria	Hyundai Shell Mobis WRT	Hyundai i20 N Rally1	Accident damage		0	0	0	0
Retired SS15		1	Thierry Neuville	Martijn Wydaeghe	Hyundai Shell Mobis WRT	Hyundai i20 N Rally1	Electrical		0	0	0	0
Retired SS3		55	Josh McErlean	Eoin Treacy	M-Sport Ford WRT	Ford Puma Rally1	Accident		0	0	0	0

==== Special stages ====
Stage	Winners	Car	Time	Class leaders
SD	Evans / Martin	Toyota GR Yaris Rally1	2:13.8	—N/a
SS1	Rovanperä / Halttunen	Toyota GR Yaris Rally1	2:07.5	Rovanperä / Halttunen
SS2	Ogier / Landais	Toyota GR Yaris Rally1	10:20.9	Ogier / Landais
SS3	Katsuta / Johnston	Toyota GR Yaris Rally1	9:36.7	Katsuta / Johnston
SS4	Evans / Martin	Toyota GR Yaris Rally1	14:57.6	Ogier / Landais
SS5	Ogier / Landais	Toyota GR Yaris Rally1	14:47.8	Ogier / Landais
SS6	Ogier / Landais	Toyota GR Yaris Rally1	10:18.9	Ogier / Landais
SS7	Evans / Martin	Toyota GR Yaris Rally1	9:34.7	Ogier / Landais
SS8	Fourmaux / Coria	Hyundai i20 N Rally1	9:34.7	Ogier / Landais
SS9	Fourmaux / Coria	Hyundai i20 N Rally1	15:07.4	Ogier / Landais
SS10	Evans / Martin	Toyota GR Yaris Rally1	14:17.3	Ogier / Landais
SS11	Evans / Martin	Toyota GR Yaris Rally1	14:07.5	Ogier / Landais
SS12	Ogier / Landais	Toyota GR Yaris Rally1	14:57.3	Ogier / Landais
SS13	Ogier / Landais	Toyota GR Yaris Rally1	10:00.9	Ogier / Landais
SS14	Ogier / Landais	Toyota GR Yaris Rally1	2:14.6	Ogier / Landais
SS15	Tänak / Järveoja	Hyundai i20 N Rally1	12:52.5	Ogier / Landais
SS16	Ogier / Landais	Toyota GR Yaris Rally1	9:14.3	Ogier / Landais
SS17	Ogier / Landais	Toyota GR Yaris Rally1	1:57.4	Ogier / Landais
SS18	Katsuta / Johnston	Toyota GR Yaris Rally1	1:56.4	Ogier / Landais
SS19	Ogier / Landais	Toyota GR Yaris Rally1	12:36.4	Ogier / Landais
SS20	Ogier / Landais	Toyota GR Yaris Rally1	9:29.3	Ogier / Landais

==== Championship standings ====
- **Bold text** indicates 2025 World Champions.

Drivers' Standings
Move	Pos.	Driver	Points
	1	Elfyn Evans	272
	2	Sébastien Ogier	269
	3	Kalle Rovanperä	248
	4	Ott Tänak	213
	5	Thierry Neuville	166

Co-drivers' Standings
Move	Pos.	Driver	Points
	1	Scott Martin	272
	2	Vincent Landais	269
	3	Jonne Halttunen	248
	4	Martin Järveoja	213
	5	Martijn Wydaeghe	166

Manufacturers' Standings
Move	Pos.	Driver	Points
	1	**Toyota Gazoo Racing WRT**	692
	2	Hyundai Shell Mobis WRT	464
	3	M-Sport Ford WRT	191
	4	Toyota Gazoo Racing WRT2	145

=== WRC2 Rally2 ===
==== Classification ====
Position		No.	Driver	Co-driver	Entrant	Car	Time	Difference	Points	
Event	Class	No.	Driver	Co-driver	Entrant	Car	Time	Difference	Class	Event
8	1	24	Alejandro Cachón	Borja Rozada	Toyota España	Toyota GR Yaris Rally2	3:31:50.5	0.0	25	4
9	2	23	Nikolay Gryazin	Konstantin Aleksandrov	Toksport WRT	Toyota GR Yaris Rally2	3:32:45.1	+54.6	17	2
10	3	22	Jan Solans	Rodrigo Sanjuan de Eusebio	PH.Ph	Toyota GR Yaris Rally2	3:33:34.9	+1:44.4	15	1
11	4	28	Heikki Kovalainen	Sae Kitagawa	Heikki Kovalainen	Toyota GR Yaris Rally2	3:35:59.9	+4:09.4	12	0
12	5	27	Hiroki Arai	Hiroki Tachikui	R2R×YAHAGI Racing Team	Škoda Fabia R5	3:36:17.1	+4:26.6	10	0
13	6	26	Diego Domínguez Jr.	Rogelio Peñate	Diego Domínguez Jr.	Toyota GR Yaris Rally2	3:36:30.6	+4:40.1	8	0
14	7	30	Takuma Kamada	Yuichi Matsumoto	Takuma Kamada	Škoda Fabia R5	3:46:07.6	+14:17.1	6	0
16	8	31	Fumio Nutahara	Shungo Azuma	Fumio Nutahara	Toyota GR Yaris Rally2	3:54:01.4	+22:10.9	4	0
25	9	34	Satoshi Imai	Fuyu Takahashi	Satoshi Imai	Citroën C3 Rally2	5:01:09.0	+1:29:18.5	2	0
Retired SS20		25	Yuki Yamamoto	James Fulton	Toyota Gazoo Racing WRT NG	Toyota GR Yaris Rally2	Accident		0	0
Retired SS16		32	Osamu Fukunaga	Misako Saida	Osamu Fukunaga	Škoda Fabia Rally2 evo	Mechanical		0	0
Retired SS9		21	Gus Greensmith	Jonas Andersson	Gus Greensmith	Škoda Fabia RS Rally2	Brakes		0	0
Retired SS9		29	Norihiko Katsuta	Yusuke Kimura	Toyota Gazoo Racing WRJ	Toyota GR Yaris Rally2	Accident		0	0

==== Special stages ====
Overall
Stage	Winners	Car	Time	Class leaders
SD	Gryazin / Aleksandrov	Škoda Fabia RS Rally2	2:17.1	—N/a
SS1	Cachón / Rozada	Toyota GR Yaris Rally2	2:11.7	Cachón / Rozada
SS2	Cachón / Rozada	Toyota GR Yaris Rally2	10:54.4	Cachón / Rozada
SS3	Cachón / Rozada	Toyota GR Yaris Rally2	10:13.9	Cachón / Rozada
SS4	Gryazin / Aleksandrov	Škoda Fabia RS Rally2	15:39.0	Gryazin / Aleksandrov
SS5	Cachón / Rozada	Toyota GR Yaris Rally2	15:27.9	Cachón / Rozada
SS6	Cachón / Rozada	Toyota GR Yaris Rally2	10:51.1	Cachón / Rozada
SS7	Cachón / Rozada	Toyota GR Yaris Rally2	10:08.1	Cachón / Rozada
SS8	Cachón / Rozada	Toyota GR Yaris Rally2	10:38.6	Cachón / Rozada
SS9	Gryazin / Aleksandrov	Škoda Fabia RS Rally2	15:53.3	Cachón / Rozada
SS10	Cachón / Rozada	Toyota GR Yaris Rally2	15:05.7	Cachón / Rozada
SS11	Cachón / Rozada	Toyota GR Yaris Rally2	14:52.1	Cachón / Rozada
SS12	Cachón / Rozada	Toyota GR Yaris Rally2	15:39.7	Cachón / Rozada
SS13	Solans / Sanjuan de Eusebio	Toyota GR Yaris Rally2	10:32.0	Cachón / Rozada
SS14	Gryazin / Aleksandrov	Škoda Fabia RS Rally2	2:20.4	Cachón / Rozada
SS15	Solans / Sanjuan de Eusebio	Toyota GR Yaris Rally2	13:24.9	Cachón / Rozada
SS16	Solans / Sanjuan de Eusebio	Toyota GR Yaris Rally2	9:45.3	Cachón / Rozada
SS17	Cachón / Rozada	Toyota GR Yaris Rally2	2:01.5	Cachón / Rozada
SS18	Kovalainen / Kitagawa	Toyota GR Yaris Rally2	2:00.4	Cachón / Rozada
SS19	Cachón / Rozada	Toyota GR Yaris Rally2	13:08.8	Cachón / Rozada
SS20	Arai / Tachikui	Škoda Fabia R5	10:07.0	Cachón / Rozada

Challenger
Stage	Winners	Car	Time	Class leaders
SD	Gryazin / Aleksandrov	Škoda Fabia RS Rally2	2:17.1	—N/a
SS1	Cachón / Rozada	Toyota GR Yaris Rally2	2:11.7	Cachón / Rozada
SS2	Cachón / Rozada	Toyota GR Yaris Rally2	10:54.4	Cachón / Rozada
SS3	Cachón / Rozada	Toyota GR Yaris Rally2	10:13.9	Cachón / Rozada
SS4	Gryazin / Aleksandrov	Škoda Fabia RS Rally2	15:39.0	Gryazin / Aleksandrov
SS5	Cachón / Rozada	Toyota GR Yaris Rally2	15:27.9	Cachón / Rozada
SS6	Cachón / Rozada	Toyota GR Yaris Rally2	10:51.1	Cachón / Rozada
SS7	Cachón / Rozada	Toyota GR Yaris Rally2	10:08.1	Cachón / Rozada
SS8	Cachón / Rozada	Toyota GR Yaris Rally2	10:38.6	Cachón / Rozada
SS9	Gryazin / Aleksandrov	Škoda Fabia RS Rally2	15:53.3	Cachón / Rozada
SS10	Cachón / Rozada	Toyota GR Yaris Rally2	15:05.7	Cachón / Rozada
SS11	Cachón / Rozada	Toyota GR Yaris Rally2	14:52.1	Cachón / Rozada
SS12	Cachón / Rozada	Toyota GR Yaris Rally2	15:39.7	Cachón / Rozada
SS13	Solans / Sanjuan de Eusebio	Toyota GR Yaris Rally2	10:32.0	Cachón / Rozada
SS14	Gryazin / Aleksandrov	Škoda Fabia RS Rally2	2:20.4	Cachón / Rozada
SS15	Solans / Sanjuan de Eusebio	Toyota GR Yaris Rally2	13:24.9	Cachón / Rozada
SS16	Solans / Sanjuan de Eusebio	Toyota GR Yaris Rally2	9:45.3	Cachón / Rozada
SS17	Cachón / Rozada	Toyota GR Yaris Rally2	2:01.5	Cachón / Rozada
SS18	Kovalainen / Kitagawa	Toyota GR Yaris Rally2	2:00.4	Cachón / Rozada
SS19	Cachón / Rozada	Toyota GR Yaris Rally2	13:08.8	Cachón / Rozada
SS20	Arai / Tachikui	Škoda Fabia R5	10:07.0	Cachón / Rozada

==== Championship standings ====
- **Bold text** indicates 2025 World Champions.

Drivers' Standings
Move	Pos.	Driver	Points
	1	**Oliver Solberg**	135
	2	Yohan Rossel	99
4	3	Nikolay Gryazin	74
1	4	Roope Korhonen	69
3	5	Jan Solans	69

Co-drivers' Standings
Move	Pos.	Driver	Points
	1	**Elliott Edmondson**	135
	2	Arnaud Dunand	99
3	3	Konstantin Aleksandrov	74
1	4	Anssi Viinikka	69
3	5	Rodrigo Sanjuan de Eusebio	69

Manufacturers' Standings
Move	Pos.	Driver	Points
	1	Toksport WRT	198
	2	PH Sport	178
	3	Toyota Gazoo Racing WRT NG	89
	4	Sarrazin Motorsport – Iron Lynx	64

Challenger Drivers' Standings
Move	Pos.	Driver	Points
2	1	Nikolay Gryazin	94
1	2	Roope Korhonen	90
2	3	Jan Solans	87
2	4	Roberto Daprà	86
1	5	Robert Virves	75

Challenger Co-drivers' Standings
Move	Pos.	Driver	Points
1	1	Konstantin Aleksandrov	94
1	2	Anssi Viinikka	90
1	3	Diego Sanjuan de Eusebio	87
4	4	Borja Rozada	79
2	5	Jakko Viilo	75

=== WRC3 Rally3 ===
==== Classification ====
Position		No.	Driver	Co-driver	Entrant	Car	Time	Difference	Points
Event	Class	No.	Driver	Co-driver	Entrant	Car	Time	Difference	Points
15	1	36	Ghjuvanni Rossi	Kylian Sarmezan	Ghjuvanni Rossi	Ford Fiesta Rally3	3:51:56.6	0.0	**25**
19	2	35	Matteo Fontana	Alessandro Arnaboldi	Matteo Fontana	Ford Fiesta Rally3	4:06:29.6	+14:33.0	**17**
21	3	38	Eric Royère	Alexis Grenier	Eric Royère	Ford Fiesta Rally3	4:26:34.5	+34:37.9	**15**
29	4	37	Georgios Vasilakis	Allan Harryman	Georgios Vasilakis	Ford Fiesta Rally3	5:34:06.7	+1:42:10.1	**12**

==== Special stages ====
Stage	Winners	Car	Time	Class leaders
SD	Fontana / Arnaboldi	Ford Fiesta Rally3	2:21.3	—N/a
SS1	Fontana / Arnaboldi	Ford Fiesta Rally3	2:21.3	Fontana / Arnaboldi
SS2	Rossi / Sarmezan	Ford Fiesta Rally3	11:47.8	Rossi / Sarmezan
SS3	stage cancelled			
SS4	Rossi / Sarmezan	Ford Fiesta Rally3	16:51.3	Rossi / Sarmezan
SS5	Rossi / Sarmezan	Ford Fiesta Rally3	16:47.9	Rossi / Sarmezan
SS6	Rossi / Sarmezan	Ford Fiesta Rally3	11:47.9	Rossi / Sarmezan
SS7	Rossi / Sarmezan	Ford Fiesta Rally3	11:16.0	Rossi / Sarmezan
SS8	Rossi / Sarmezan	Ford Fiesta Rally3	11:44.5	Rossi / Sarmezan
SS9	stage cancelled			
SS10	Rossi / Sarmezan	Ford Fiesta Rally3	16:41.7	Rossi / Sarmezan
SS11	Rossi / Sarmezan	Ford Fiesta Rally3	16:24.2	Rossi / Sarmezan
SS12	Rossi / Sarmezan	Ford Fiesta Rally3	17:17.2	Rossi / Sarmezan
SS13	Rossi / Sarmezan	Ford Fiesta Rally3	11:49.3	Rossi / Sarmezan
SS14	Royère / Grenier	Ford Fiesta Rally3	2:30.4	Rossi / Sarmezan
SS15	Rossi / Sarmezan	Ford Fiesta Rally3	15:16.9	Rossi / Sarmezan
SS16	Rossi / Sarmezan	Ford Fiesta Rally3	10:51.6	Rossi / Sarmezan
SS17	Rossi / Sarmezan	Ford Fiesta Rally3	2:08.9	Rossi / Sarmezan
SS18	Rossi / Sarmezan	Ford Fiesta Rally3	2:07.0	Rossi / Sarmezan
SS19	Rossi / Sarmezan	Ford Fiesta Rally3	15:10.9	Rossi / Sarmezan
SS20	Rossi / Sarmezan	Ford Fiesta Rally3	11:23.6	Rossi / Sarmezan

==== Championship standings ====
- **Bold text** indicates 2025 World Champions.

Drivers' Standings
Move	Pos.	Driver	Points
1	1	**Matteo Fontana**	126
1	2	Taylor Gill	117
5	3	Ghjuvanni Rossi	78
1	4	Kerem Kazaz	72
1	5	Arthur Pelamourges	60

Co-drivers' Standings
Move	Pos.	Driver	Points
1	1	**Alessandro Arnaboldi**	126
1	2	Daniel Brkic	117
4	3	Kylian Sarmezan	78
1	4	Corentin Silvestre	72
1	5	Bastien Pouget	60

Previous rally: 2025 Central European Rally	2025 FIA World Rally Championship	Next rally: 2025 Rally Saudi Arabia
Previous rally: 2024 Rally Japan	2025 Rally Japan	Next rally: 2026 Rally Japan
