= Keihan Takahashi =

Japanese volleyball player (born 2003)

Personal information
- Born: 13 October 2003 (age 23); Asahi, Chiba, Japan
- Height: 1.94 m (6 ft 4 in)
- Weight: 80 kg (176 lb)
- Spike: 350 cm (138 in)
- Block: 325 cm (128 in)

Volleyball information
- Position: Outside Hitter
- Current club: (France) Paris Volley
- Number: 24 (national team); 31 (club)

Career
Years	Teams
2019–2022	(Japan) Narashino High School
2023–	(Japan) Hosei University
2023–2024 2026–	(Japan) JTEKT Stings
2024–2026	(France) Paris Volley

National team
2023–present	Japan
Medal record
Men's volleyball
Representing Japan
Asian Games
Silver medal – second place	2026 Aichi–Nagoya	Team
Bronze medal – third place	2022 Hangzhou	Team

Keihan Takahashi (Japanese: 高橋 慶帆; Persian: کیهان تاکاهاشی; born 13 October 2003) is a Japanese volleyball player who currently plays for JTEKT Stings and the Japan men's national volleyball team.

== Early life and education ==
Takahashi was born on 13 October 2003, in Asahi, Chiba Prefecture, Japan, to an Iranian father and a Japanese mother. He has an elder brother four years his senior.

In 2019, he entered Narashino Municipal High School. During which he participated in Spring High Volleyball for three consecutive years.

Takahashi enrolled in Hosei University's Faculty of Business Administration in 2022.

He was present with the Japanese national volleyball team in the 2022 Asian Games and won the bronze medal in the 2023 Nations League.
