= Kaewkalaya Kamulthala =

Thai volleyball player

Personal information
- Full name: Kaewkalaya Kamulthala
- Nickname: Thip
- Nationality: Thailand
- Born: August 7, 1994 (age 32); Kalasin, Thailand
- Height: 1.79 m (5 ft 10 in)
- Weight: 66 kg (146 lb)
- Spike: 298 cm (117 in)
- Block: 281 cm (111 in)

Volleyball information
- Position: Middle Blocker
- Current club: Nakhon Ratchasima
- Number: 41

National team
| 2013–2014, 2019, 2022, 2026 | Thailand |
Honours
Women's volleyball
Representing Thailand
Asian Games
| Bronze medal – third place | 2014 Incheon | Team |
| Bronze medal – third place | 2026 Aich/Nagoya | Team |
AVC Continental Championship
| Gold medal – first place | 2026 Tianjin | Team |
Summer Universiade
| Bronze medal – third place | 2013 Kazan | Team |

Kaewkalaya Kamulthala (Thai: แก้วกัลยา กมุลทะลา, born August 7, 1994) is a Thai indoor volleyball player. She is a member of the Thailand women's national volleyball team.

== Career ==
She participated at the 2015 U23 World Championship, 2016 World Grand Prix and 2019 Nations League.

In 2018 she played with the local JT Marvelous.

== Clubs ==
- (Thailand) Khonkaen Star (2012–2018, 2020–2021, 2024–2025)
- (Japan) JT Marvelous (2018–2020)
- (Thailand) Diamond Food (2021–2024)
- (Vietnam) Hà Nội Tasco Auto (2025, loan)
- (Thailand) Nakhon Ratchasima (2026)

== Awards ==
=== Clubs ===
- 2012–13 Thailand League – Champion, with Idea Khonkaen
- 2013 Thai-Denmark Super League – Champion, with Idea Khonkaen
- 2019–20 Japan V.League – Champion, with JT Marvelous
- 2023 Asian Club Championship – Runner-up, with Diamond Food–Fine Chef

=== Individual awards ===
- 2023 Asian Club Championship – "Best Middle blocker"
