= Poriya Hossein Khanzadeh =

Iranian volleyball player (born 2004)

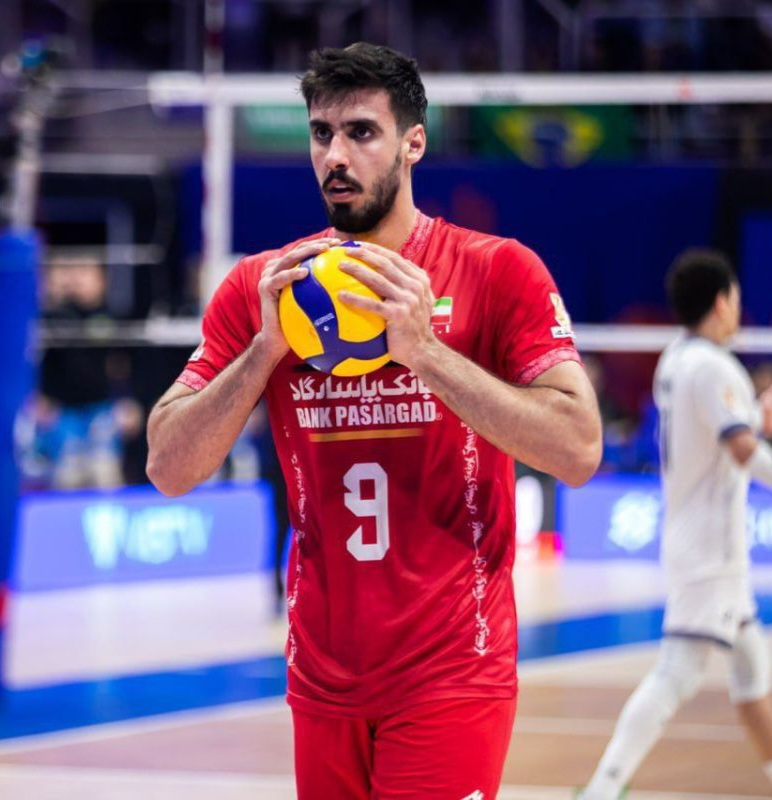
- Poriya Hossein Khanzadeh

Personal information
- Full name: Poriya Hossein Khanzadeh Firouzjah
- Nationality: Iranian
- Born: 1 July 2004 (age 22); Babol, Iran
- Height: 2.02 m (6 ft 8 in)
- Weight: 90 kg (198 lb)
- Spike: 375 cm (148 in)
- Block: 355 cm (140 in)

Volleyball information
- Position: Outside hitter
- Current club: Volley Lube

Career
Years	Teams
2020–2021; 2021–2023; 2023–2024; 2024-	(Iran) Shahdab Yazd (Iran) Haraz Amol (Iran) Foolad Sirjan (Italy) Volley Lube

National team
2021–2022; 2022– 2023–	Iran U19; Iran U21; Iran
Honours
Men's volleyball
Representing Iran
Asian Games
Gold medal – first place	2022 Hangzhou	Team
Gold medal – first place	2026 JPN	Team
FIVB U19 World Championship
Bronze medal – third place	2021 Tehran
Asian Men's Volleyball Championship
Silver medal – second place	Urmia 2023	Team
Silver medal – second place	JPN 2026	Team
U20 Asian Championship
Gold medal – first place	2022 Riffa
FIVB U21 World Championship
Gold medal – first place	2023 Manama	Team

Pouria Hossein Khanzadeh (born on July 1, 2004, in Babol) is a volleyball player from Iran. He is now a member of Iran men's national volleyball team. He won the third place in the 2021 World Championships with Iran under-19 national team and won the championship in the 2023 FIVB Volleyball Men's U21 World Championship along with Iran's national youth volleyball team. He was recognized as a volleyball phenomenon in Iranian Volleyball Super League in the 2022 season.

== National team ==
In 2019, Khanzadeh was invited by Masoud Armat to the Iran men's national under-19 volleyball team and was in the main composition of the 2021 FIVB Volleyball Boys' U19 World Championship held in Tehran with the national team of Iran and won the third place with and in 2023 He was invited to the senior national team by Behrouz Ataei and participated in the Volleyball Nations League with the Iranian national team. After participating in the League of Nations, he joined the under-21 national team and was able to reach the championship position with this team in the 2023 World Championship.
