= Miina Inoue =

Japanese volleyball player (born 2006)

Personal information
- Nationality: Japanese
- Born: 22 January 2006 (age 20) Inzai City, Chiba, Japan
- Height: 1.81 m (5 ft 11 in)
- Spike: 303 cm (119 in)

Volleyball information
- Position: Outside Hitter / Middle Blocker
- Current club: (Japan) Saga Hisamitsu Springs
- Number: 19 (club)

Career
- Years: Team
- 2021–2024 2024–present: (Japan) Kinrankai High School (Japan) Saga Hisamitsu Springs
Honours
Women's volleyball
Representing Japan
Women's U21 World Championship
Silver medal – second place	2025 Surabaya	Team
Asian U20 Championship
Silver medal – second place	2024 Jiangmen	Team

Miina Inoue (井上 未唯奈, Inoue Miina; born 22 January 2006) is a Japanese professional volleyball player. She plays in the SV.League for Saga Hisamitsu Springs.

== Career ==
In her first high school year, the team finished as third place in the 74th All Japan High School Championship (Haruko) (ja) after defeated by Shujitsu High School in straight sets. In her second high school year, the team won the championship in the 2022 Inter High.

It was announced that she has been offered to join Hisamitsu Springs for 2023-24 V.League Division 1 Women's on 13 December 2023.

She participated in the 2024 Asian Women's U20 Volleyball Championship where the team finished as a runner-up.

On 9 March 2025, she made her debut for the SV.League in 2024-25 SV.League Women's.

She participated in the 2025 FIVB Volleyball Women's U21 World Championship where the team won a silver medal.

In 2026, she was selected as a member of Japan women's national volleyball team for the first time. On 19 June the same year, she made her national team debut as a middle blocker in the match against the Czech Republic in for the Volleyball Nations League second week's round.
