= Park Arena Komaki =

Indoor arena in Komaki, Aichi, Japan

Coordinates: 35°18′23.29″N 136°55′18.77″E

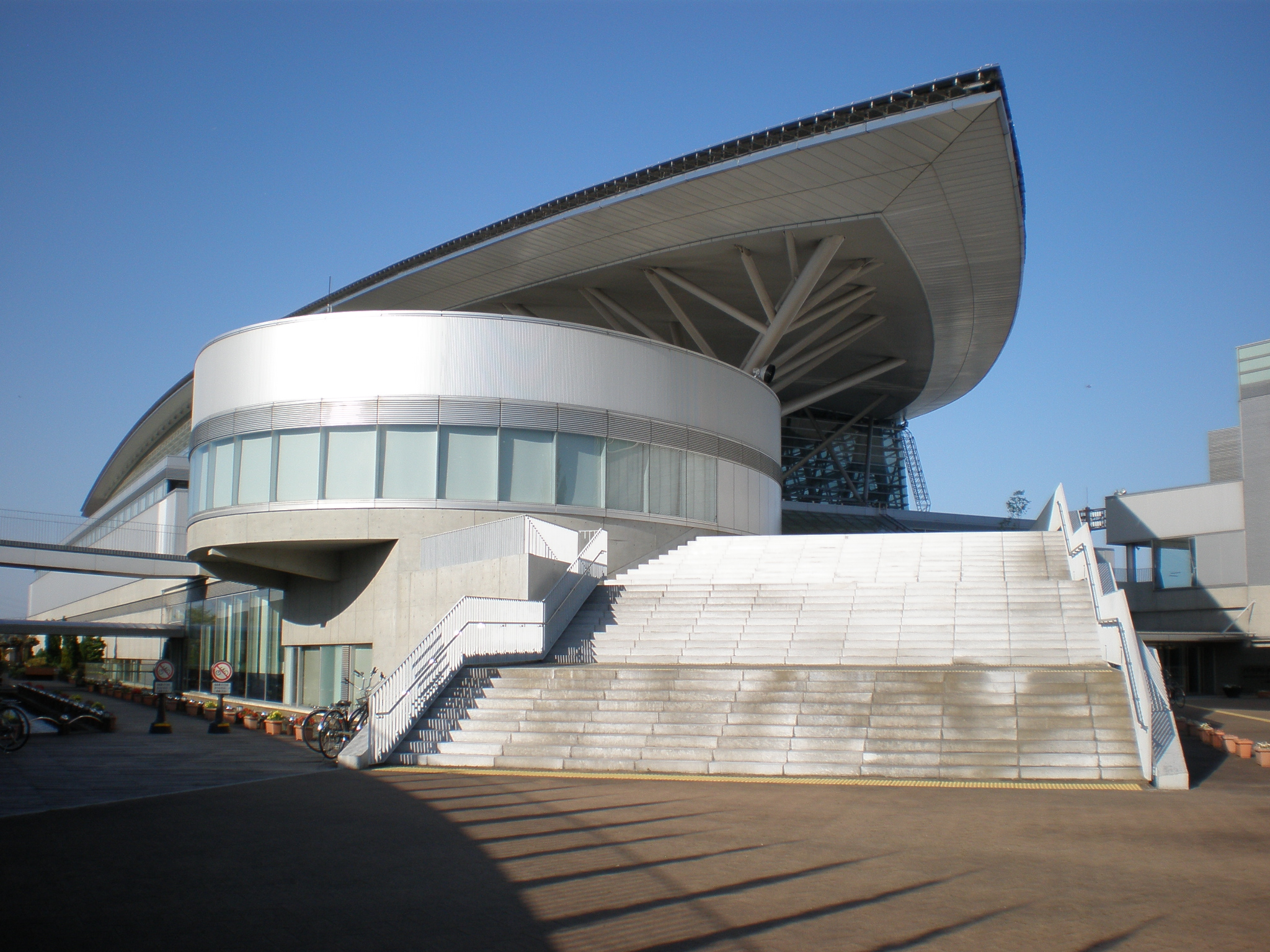
- arena side view
- Interactive map of Park Arena Komaki
- Full name: Komaki City Sports Park General Gymnasium
- Location: Komaki, Aichi, Japan
- Owner: Komaki city
- Operator: Komaki city
- Capacity: 5,000

Construction
- Opened: October, 2001
- Cost

Tenants
- 2026 Asian Games; Nagoya Oceans (2007–08)

Website
- https://www.ma.ccnw.ne.jp/komakipk/

Park Arena Komaki is an arena in Komaki, Aichi, Japan.

== Gallery ==
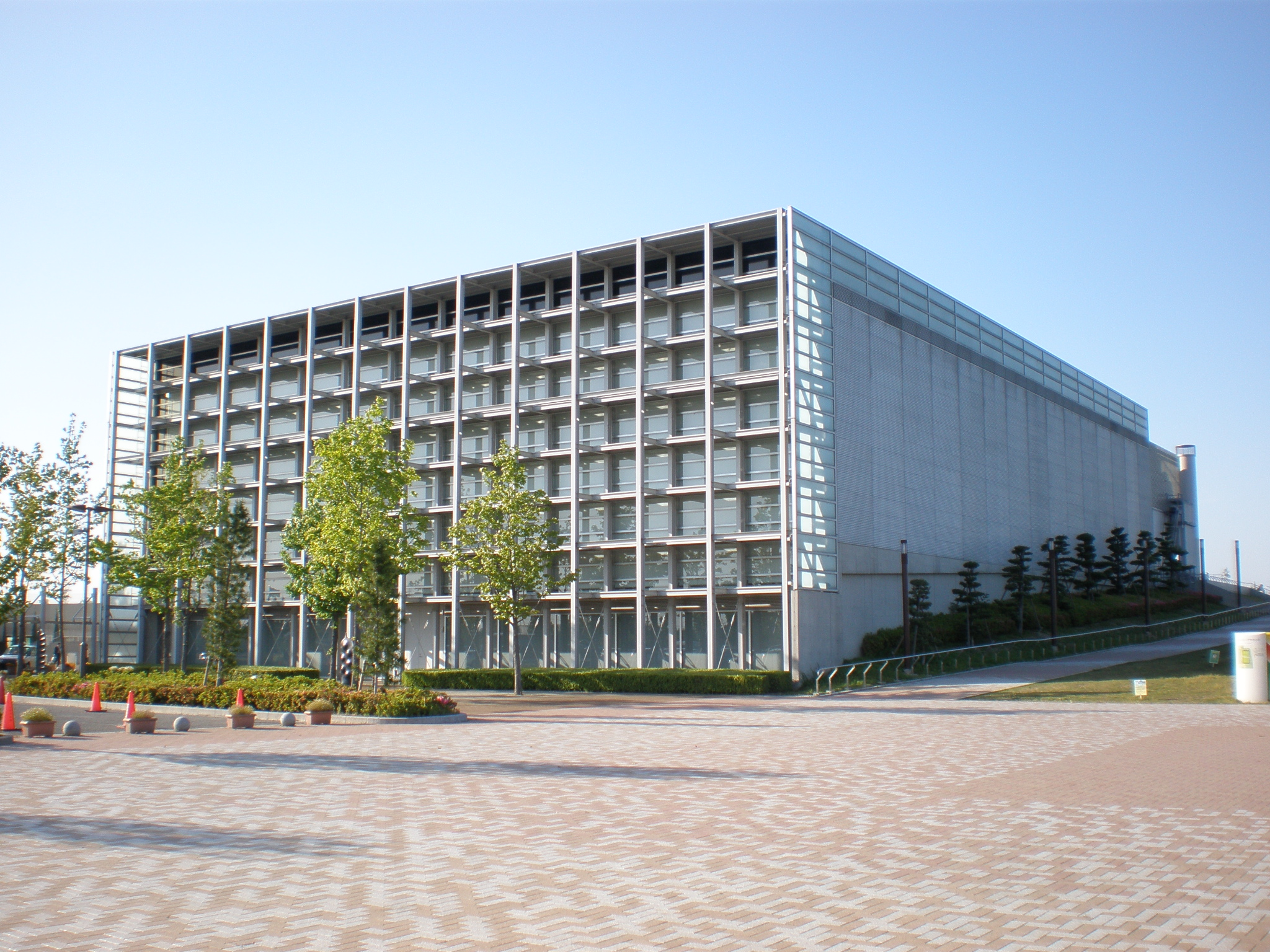
Sub Arena

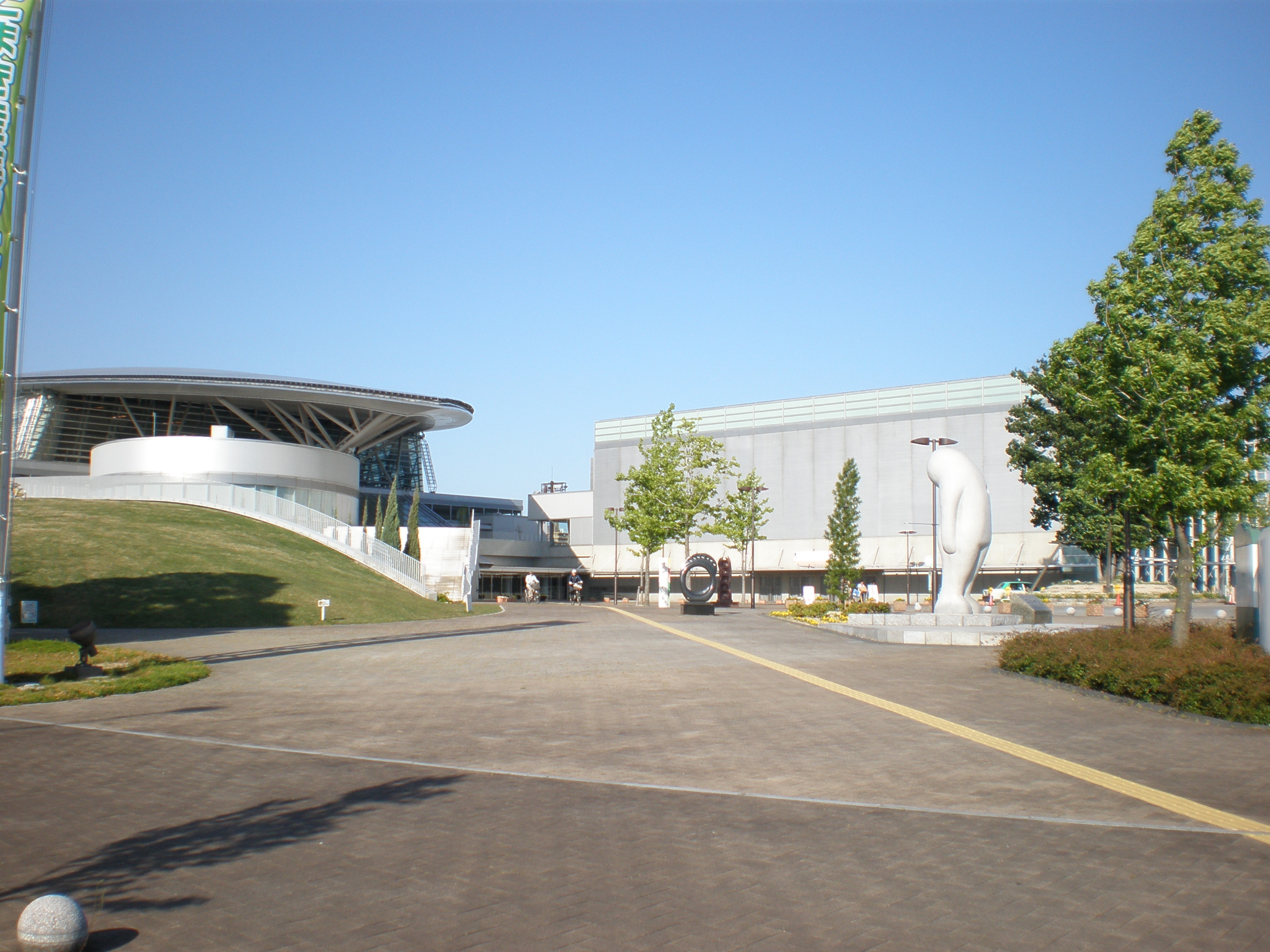

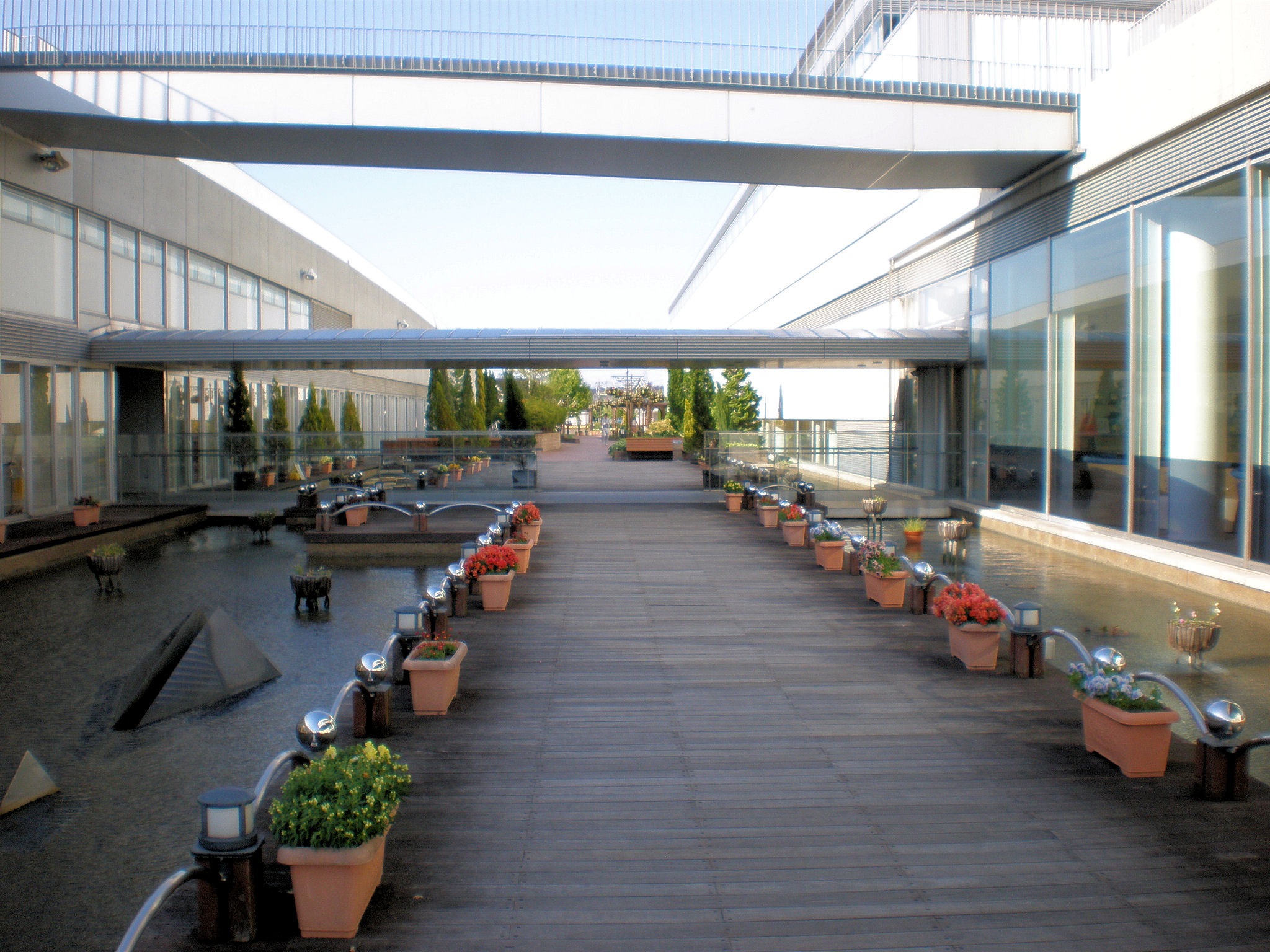

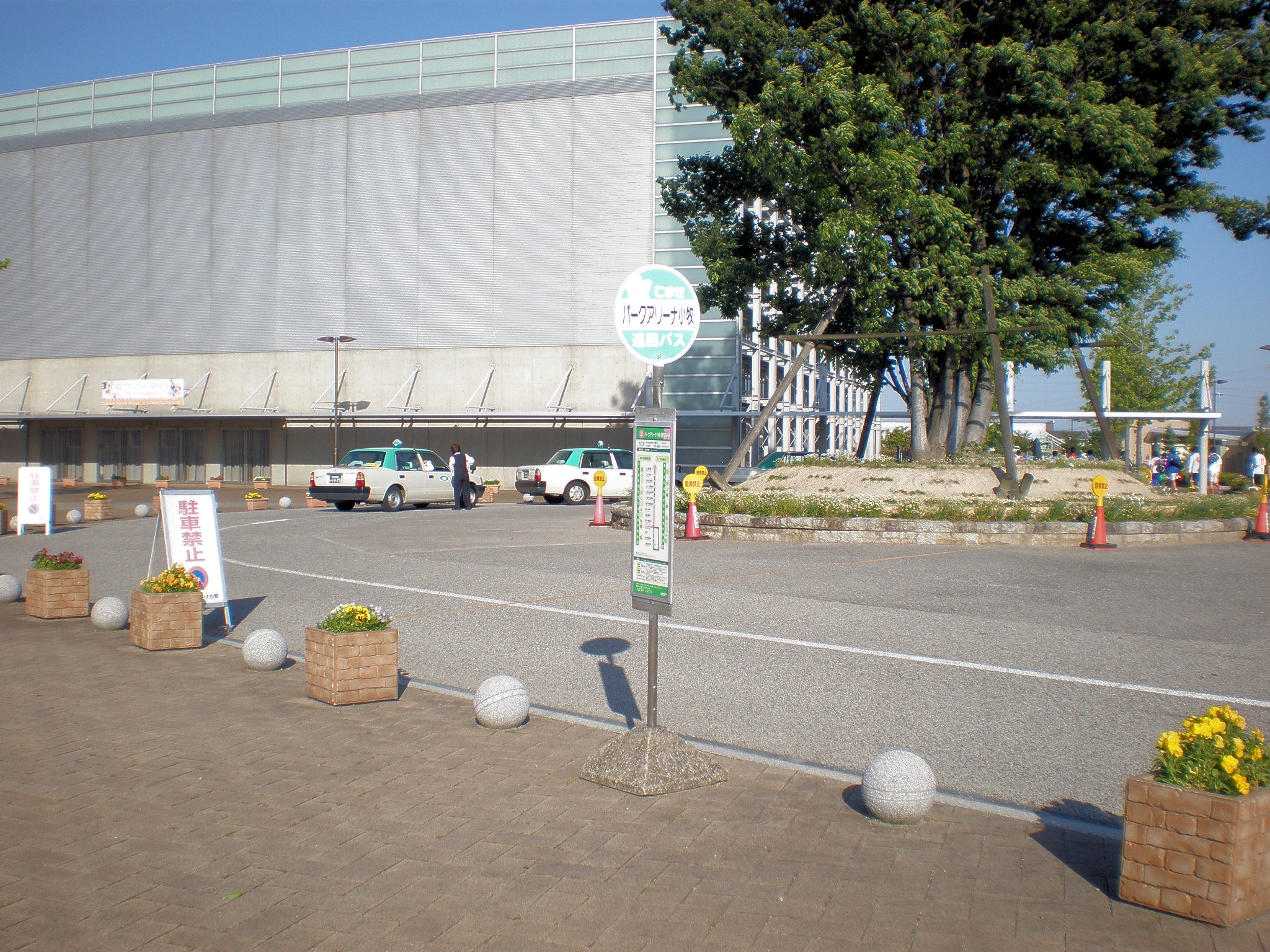

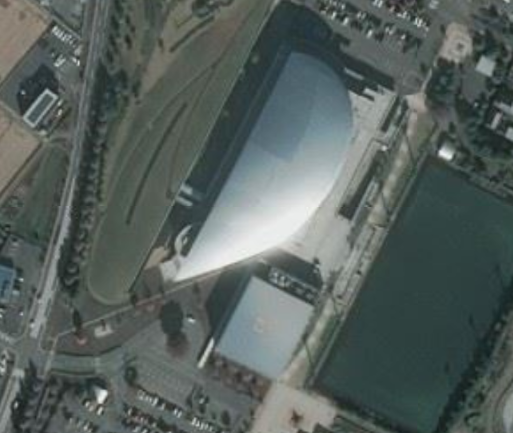
Satellite view
