= Okazaki Central Park General Gymnasium =

Multi-purpose arena in Okazaki, Aichi, Japan

Coordinates: 34°56′50.2″N 137°12′43.62″E

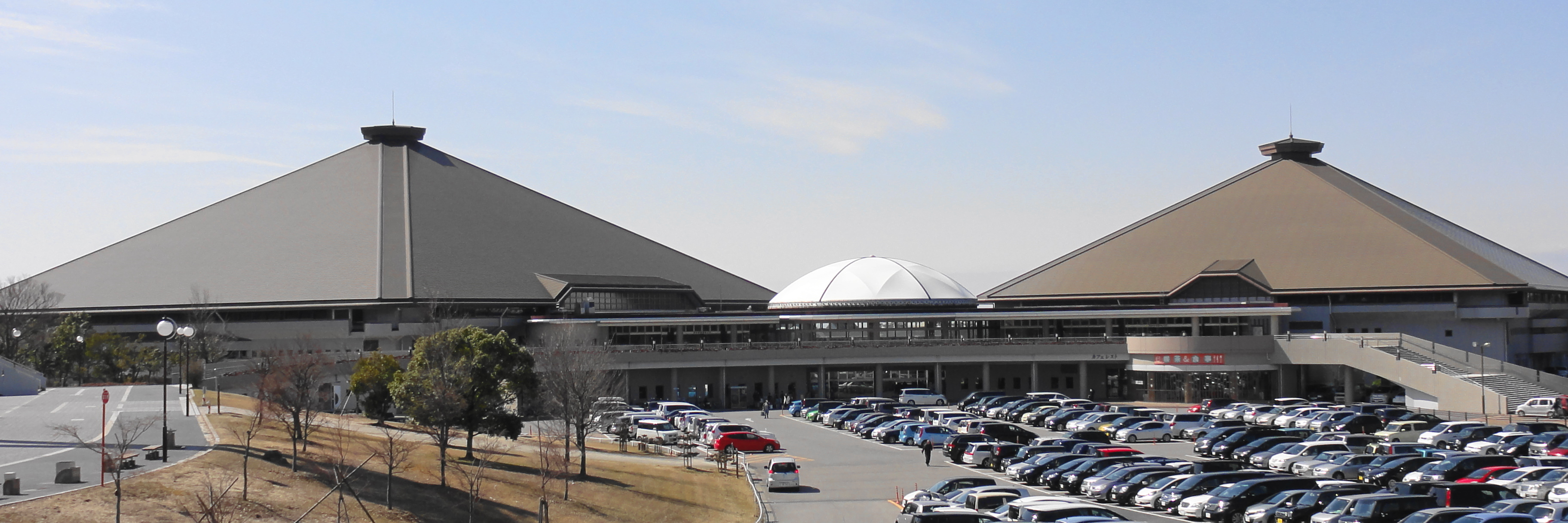
- Interactive map of Okazaki Central Park General Gymnasium
- Full name: Okazaki Central Park General Gymnasium
- Location: Okazaki Central General Park, Okazaki, Aichi, Japan
- Owner: Okazaki city
- Operator: Okazaki Public Service
- Capacity: Gymnasium:4,673; Budokan:2,204; Dojo1:180; Dojo2:180

Construction
- Opened: September 1991
- Cost

Website
- https://okazaki-kanko.jp/chuo-sogo-park/

Okazaki Central Park General Gymnasium is a multi-purpose arena in Okazaki, Aichi, Japan.

== Facilities ==
- Gymnasium 2,646m^{2}（63m×42m）
- Budokan 1,722m^{2}
- Dojo1 540m^{2}
- Dojo2 540m^{2}
- Training room
- Running course 120m

== Gallery ==
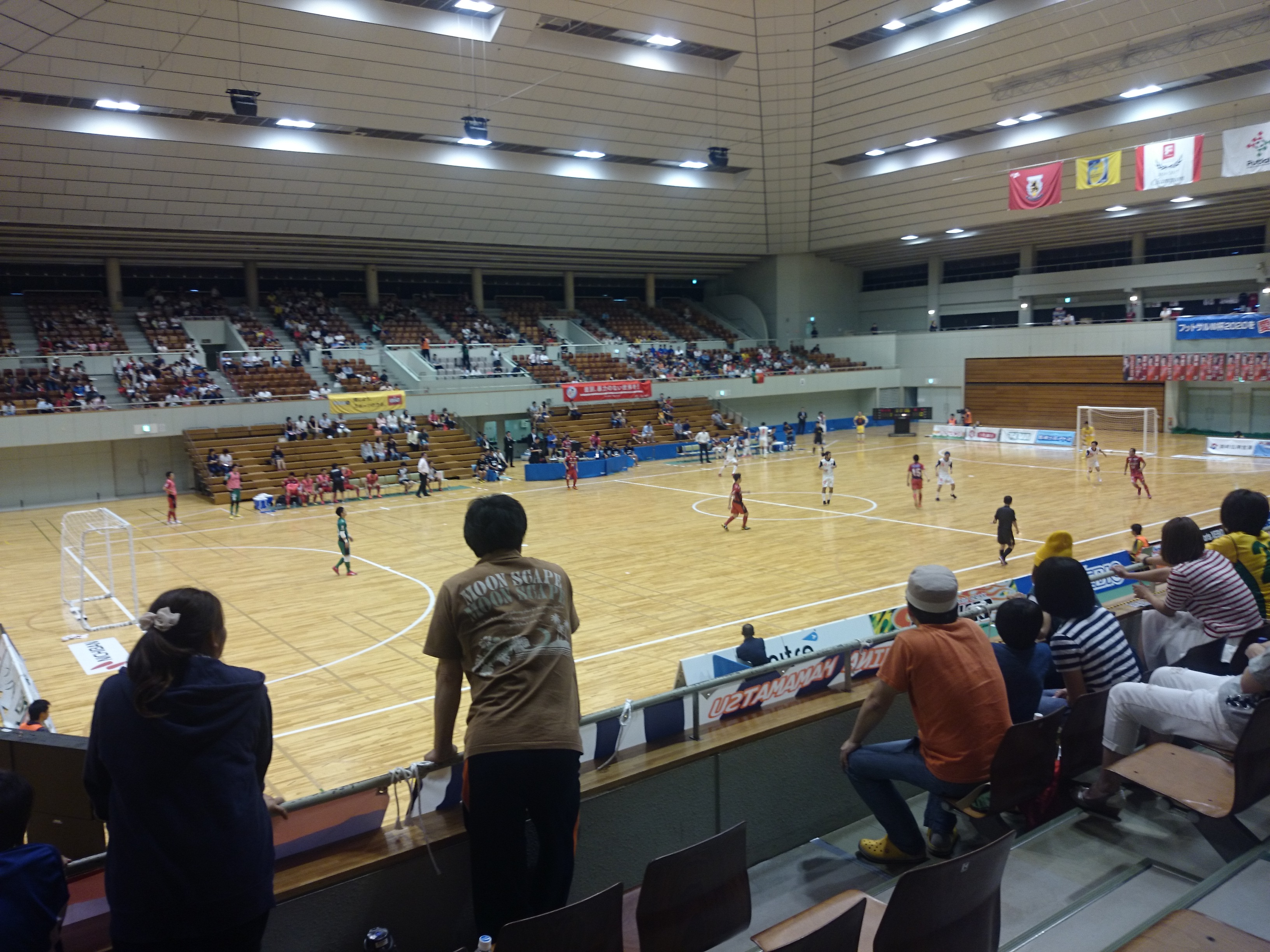

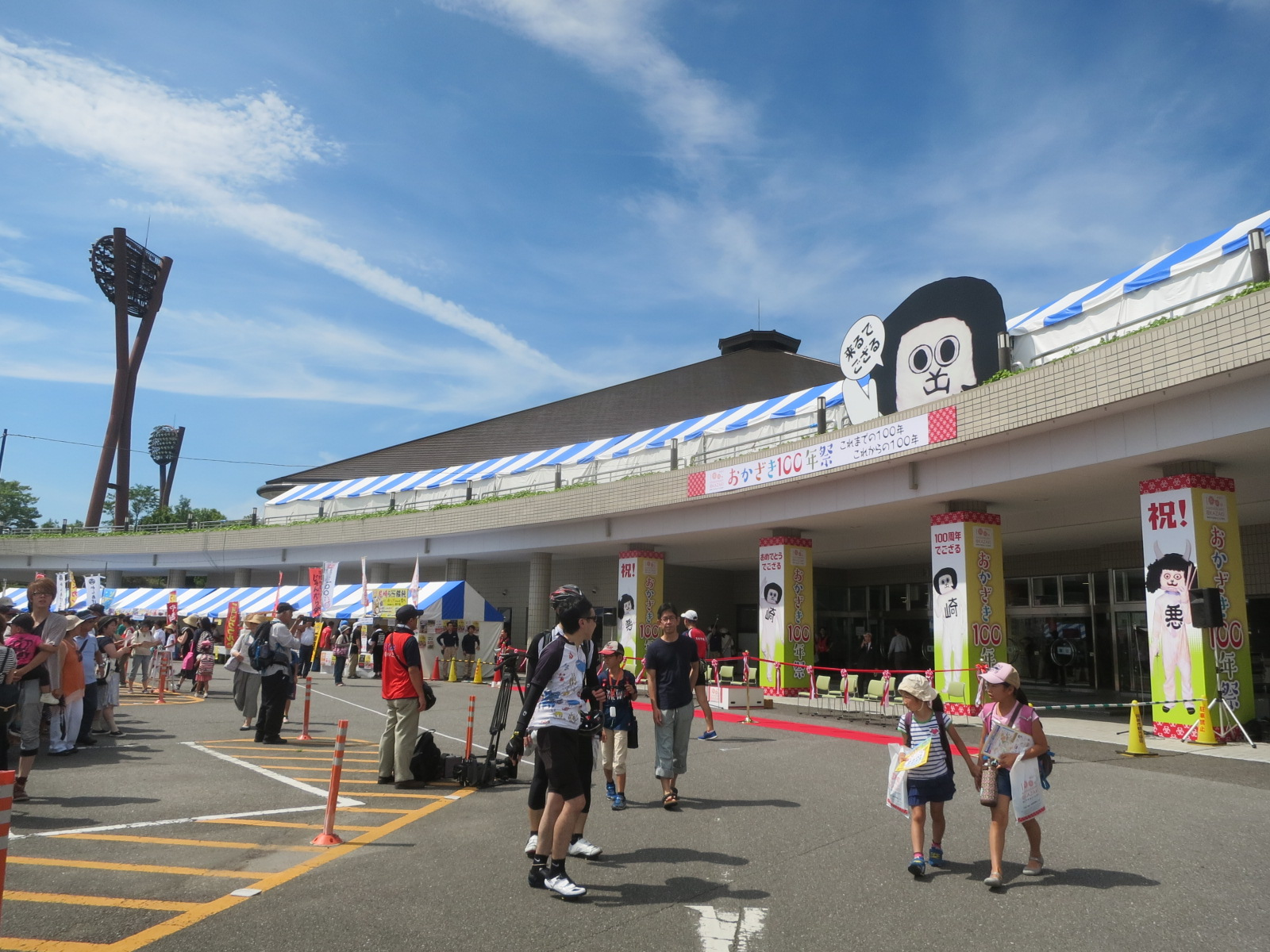

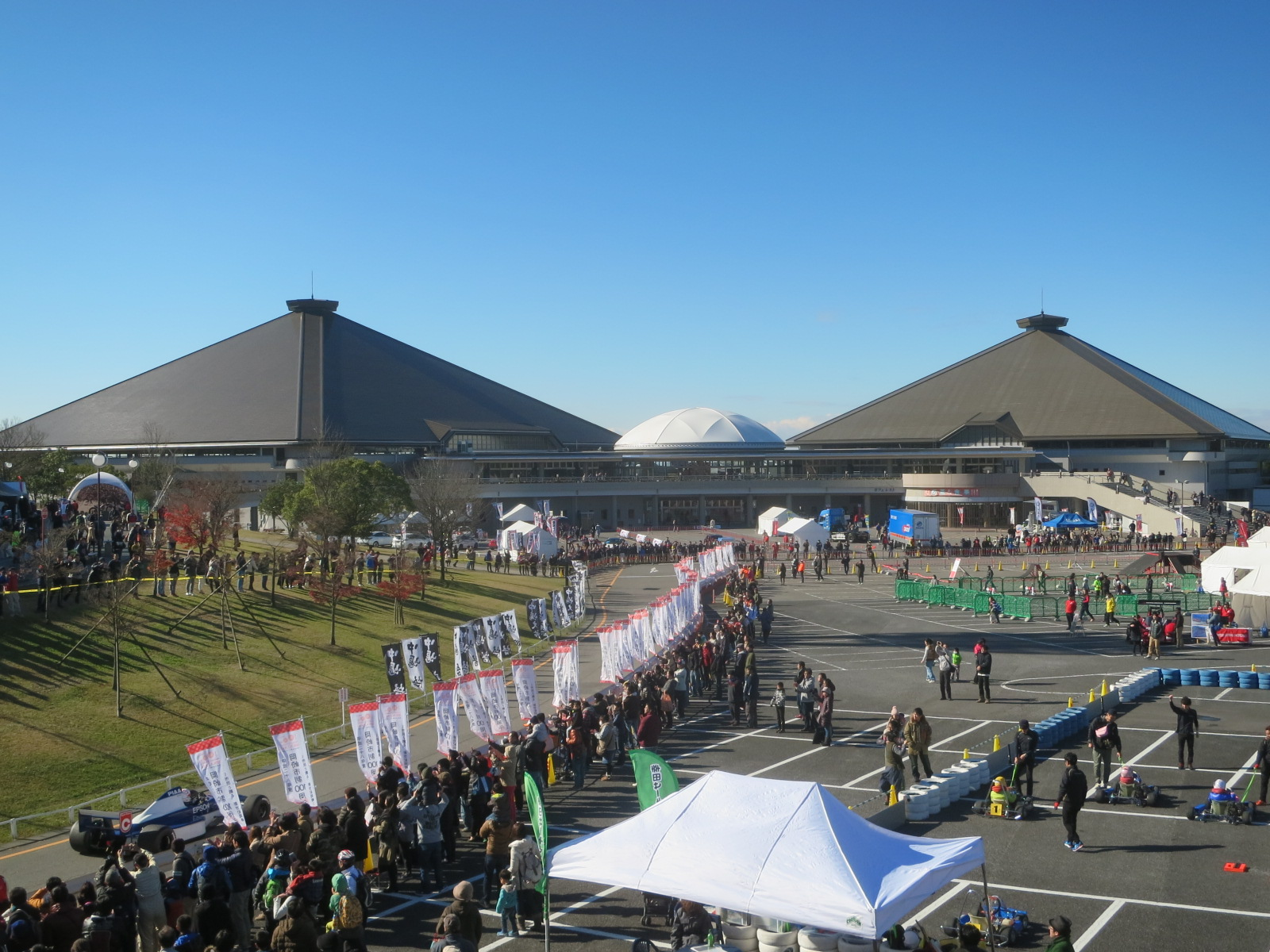

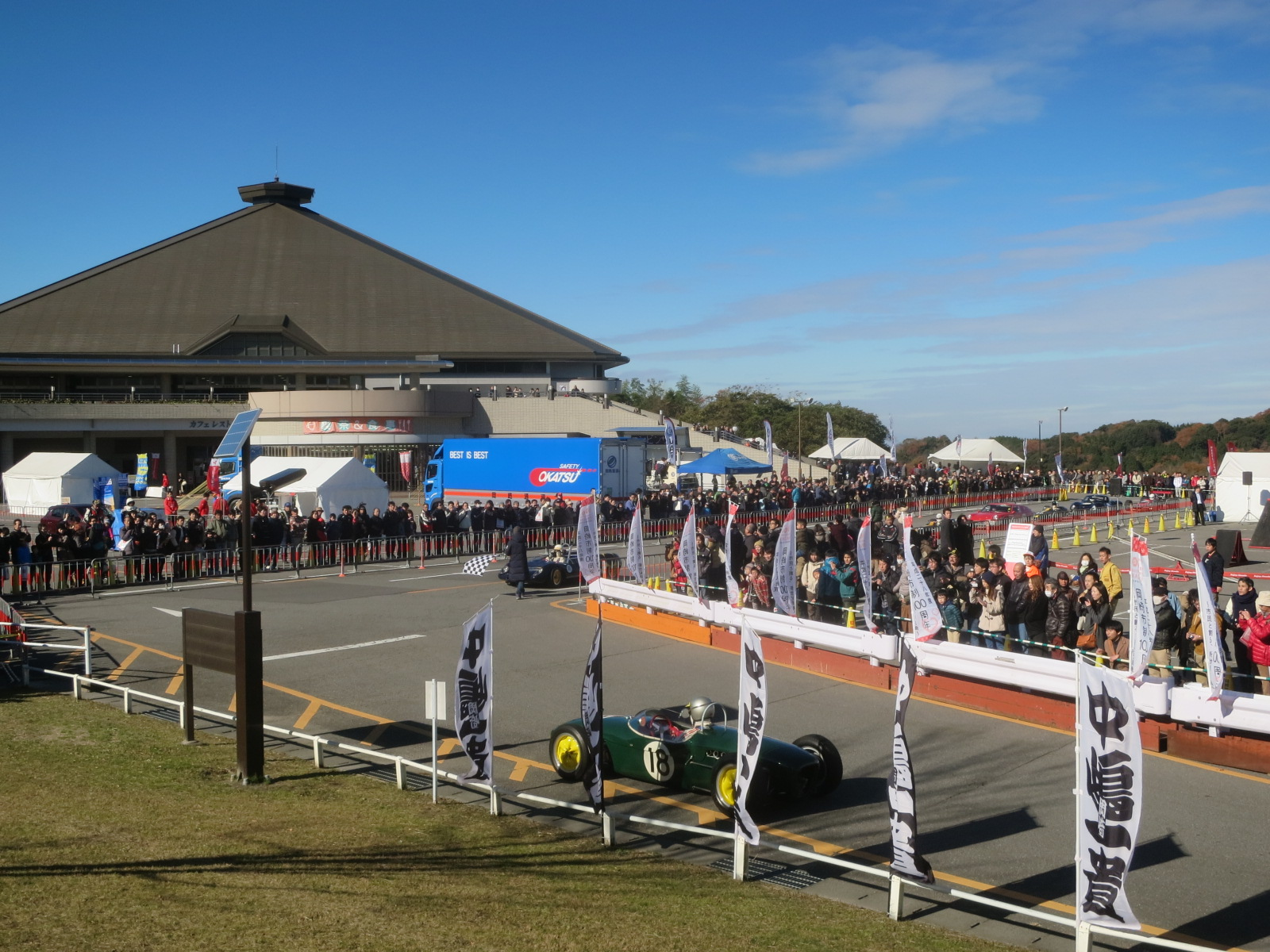

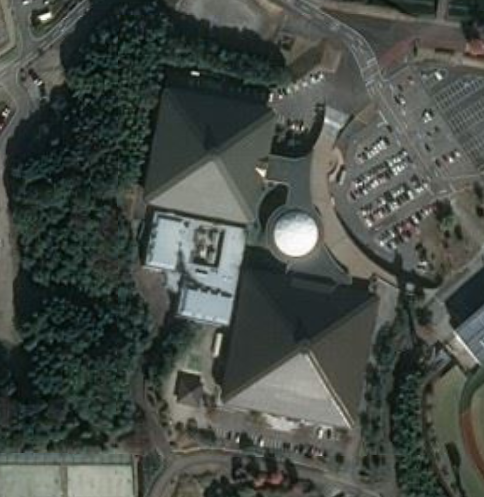
