= 2024 Everest Women's Volleyball League =

- League: Everest Women's Volleyball League
- Sport: Women's volleyball
- Duration: 30 September – 5 October
- Teams: 6

2024
- Season MVP: (Turkey) Zeynep Outran

Finals
- Champions: Karnali Yashvis (1st title)
- Runners-up: Lalitpur Queens
- Finals MVP: (Turkey) Zeynep Outran

Everest Women's Volleyball League seasons
- 2025

2024 Everest Women's Volleyball League (also known as EWVL 2024 or Vatsalya EWVL 2024) was the inaugural season of the Everest Women's Volleyball League, a franchise based Nepalese volleyball league organized by the Infinity Dreams Pvt. Ltd. and the Nepal Volleyball Association. This edition featured teams from Chitwan, Gandaki, Kathmandu, Lalitpur, Karnali and Madhesh Province. The tournament was held from 30 September to 5 October at Dasarath Stadium indoor hall. The league carries the name Vatsalya EWVL 2024 due to its title sponsorship by Vatsalya.

Karnali Yashvis defeated Lalitpur Queens by 3–2 sets (25–17, 25–20, 12–25, 18–25, 15–13) in the final to win the inaugural EWVL title.

== Personnel and kits ==
Team	Team manager	Coach	Marquee player/captain	Kit manufacturer	Shirt sponsors
Chitwan Shakti	(Nepal) Dipendra Chaudhary	(Nepal) Arjun Ghimire	(Nepal) Aruna Shahi		Shakti Meat
Gandaki Thunders	(Nepal) Vikash Khetan	(Nepal) Rupesh Kumar Bista	(Nepal) Saraswoti Chaudhary	SHIV-NARESH	Sita Ram Milk
Karnali Yashvis		(Nepal) Kumar Rai	(Nepal) Sumitra Regmi		Snickers
Kathmandu Spikers	(Nepal) Kapil G. C.	(Nepal) Jagdish Pd. Bhatta	(Nepal) Usha Bhandari		Turkish Airlines
Lalitpur Queens	(Nepal) Shradha Chhetri	(Nepal) Utsav Khadka	(Nepal) Salina Shrestha	Kelme	Rupse Holidays, Global IME Bank
Madhesh United		(Nepal) Bharat Yadav	(Nepal) Niruta Thagunna		Birgunj Metropolis

== Rosters ==
Chitwan Shakti
No.	Name	Height	Position
5	(Nepal) Aruna Shahi (C)	5' 8"	Setter
15	(Nepal) Salina Budha Magar		Spiker
3	(Nepal) Jenisha Biswokarma		Spiker
11	(Nepal) Anjila Pradhan		Libero
9	(Nepal) Sunita Khadka		Blocker
1	(Nepal) Bhawana Dangi		Spiker
14	(Nepal) Balmika Acharya		Blocker
7	(Nepal) Saraswoti Kattel		Setter
6	(India) Soorya S		Middle blocker
13	(India) KP Anushree	5' 83"	Outside hitter
12	(Azerbaijan) Kseniya Pavlenko	6' 03"	Outside hitter
2	(Nepal) Niteesha Mahato (talent hunt)		
Head coach		(Nepal) Arjun Ghimire	

Gandaki Thunders
No.	Name	Height	Position
3	(Nepal) Saraswoti Chaudhary (C)	6' 1"	Outside hitter
14	(Nepal) Pragati Nath	5' 7"	Setter
1	(Nepal) Laxmi Chand	5' 8"	Spiker
16	(Nepal) Rima Kunwar	5' 5"	Spiker
7	(Nepal) Kabita Bhatta	5' 7"	Middle blocker
8	(Nepal) Aarati Chaudhary	5' 6"	Spiker
6	(Nepal) Sneha Thagunna	5' 9"	Middle blocker
13	(Nepal) Saraswoti Jaisi	5' 4"	Libero
10	(Russia) Alisa Trubyuk	6' 0"	Opposite spiker
12	(Russia) Ekaterina Zvyagintsewa	5' 8"	Opposite hitter
11	(India) Shilpa RS	6' 2"	Middle blocker
	(India) Juhi Shaw (reserve)	5' 5"	Setter
18	(Nepal) Soing Thapa (talent hunt)	5' 8"	
Head coach		(Nepal) Rupesh Kumar Bista	

Karnali Yashvis
No.	Name	Height	Position
2	(Nepal) Sumitra Regmi (C)	6' 1"	Middle blocker
6	(Nepal) Mina Sunar		Blocker
3	(Nepal) Manisha Chaudhary		Blocker
22	(Nepal) Yamuna Rasaili		Libero
1	(Nepal) Sunita Rai		Spiker
10	(Nepal) Shristi Khadgi		Spiker
14	(Nepal) Garima Bohora		Spiker
5	(Nepal) Pashupati Bohara		[[Volleyball#Player specialization|]]
9	(United States) Gabrielle Benda	5' 10"	Setter
15	(Greece) Athanasia Liagki	6' 0"	Opposite hitter
13	(Turkey) Zeynep Outran	6' 3"	Outside hitter
11	(Nepal) Sita Shingh Thakuri (talent hunt)		
Head coach		(Nepal) Kumar Rai	

Kathmandu Spikers
No.	Name	Height	Position
6	(Nepal) Usha Bhandari (C)	5' 7"	Outside hitter
11	(Nepal) Aarati Subedi	5' 10"	Spiker
8	(Nepal) Kopila Rana		Blocker
5	(Nepal) Kamala Pun		Setter
15	(Nepal) Usha Bista		Middle blocker
12	(Nepal) Nisha Mahar		Spiker
3	(Nepal) Basanti Saud		Blocker
18	(Nepal) Rasmita Dura		Libero
9	(Bulgaria) Andrea Tsvetanova	5' 9"	Setter
14	(Turkey) Pelin Eroktay	6' 2"	Opposite
10	(Turkey) Fulden Ural	6' 1"	Outside hitter
1	(Nepal) Ritika Bhatta (talent hunt)		
Head coach		(Nepal) Jagdish Pd. Bhatta	

Lalitpur Queens
No.	Name	Height	Position
18	(Nepal) Salina Shrestha (C)		Libero
12	(Nepal) Punam Chand		Open spiker
11	(Nepal) Kamana Bista		Hitter
10	(Nepal) Safiya Pun		Middle blocker
1	(Nepal) Nisha Chaudhary		Spiker
4	(Nepal) Anusha Chaudhary		Setter
2	(Nepal) Neha Chaudhary		[[Volleyball#Player specialization|]]
17	(Nepal) Bhawana Tamang		Setter
19	(Thailand) Sutadta Chuewulim	5' 8"	Outside hitter
16	(Thailand) Waranya Srilaoong	5' 8"	Outside hitter
24	(Thailand) Pattrathip Santrakoon	5' 5"	Setter
7	(Nepal) Jacquisha Thapa (talent hunt)		
Head coach		(Nepal) Utshav Khadka	

Madhesh United
No.	Name	Height	Position
1	(Nepal) Niruta Thagunna (C)	5' 5"	Spiker
4	(Nepal) Puja Chaudhary/Tharu	5' 6"	Spiker
6	(Nepal) Sangam Mahato	5' 6"	Middle blocker
14	(Nepal) Jasna Mahato		Setter
11	(Nepal) Shanti Kala Tamang		Libero
9	(Nepal) Hira Budha K. C.		Spiker
8	(Nepal) Ashika Chettri		Spiker
13	(Nepal) Alisa Manandhar		Blocker
2	(Kazakhstan) Yevgeniya Kalinova	5' 10"	Spiker
12	(Tunisia) Yosra Zeramdini	6' 1"	Middle blocker
7	(India) Jini Kovat Shaji	5" 7'	Shetter
5	(Nepal) Mina Chaudhary (talent hunt)		
Head coach		(Nepal) Bharat Yadav	

== League standings ==
Win by 3–0: 3 points
Win by other margin: 2 points
Loss: 0 points

If the teams are level on points, the number of sets won will be taken into consideration. The top two teams at the end of the league stage will move into the finals.

Pos	Team	Pld	W	L	Pts	SW	SL	SR	SPW	SPL	SPR	Qualification
1	Karnali Yashvis	5	5	0	11	15	6	2.500	484	417	1.161	Qualified for Final
2	Lalitpur Queens	5	3	2	8	11	9	1.222	457	437	1.046	Qualified for Final
3	Kathmandu Spikers	5	3	2	8	11	9	1.222	439	434	1.012	
4	Gandaki Thunders	5	2	3	8	10	11	0.909	454	435	1.044	
5	Chitwan Shakti	5	2	3	7	10	11	0.909	439	470	0.934	
6	Madhesh United	5	0	5	4	4	15	0.267	387	424	0.913	

Updated to match(es) played on 4 October 2024. Source: EWVL Official

== League stage ==
Date	Time		Score		Set 1	Set 2	Set 3	Set 4	Set 5	Total	Report
30 Sep	15:45	Kathmandu Spikers	1–3	Lalitpur Queens	20–25	25–21	21–25	19–25		85–96	
30 Sep	17:45	Madhesh United	1–3	Karnali Yashvis	15–25	20–25	28–26	11–25		74–101	
30 Sep	19:45	Chitwan Shakti	3–1	Gandaki Thunders	25–22	19–25	25–23	25–17		94–87	
1 Oct	15:45	Gandaki Thunders	2–3	Karnali Yashvis	25–15	23–25	17–25	25–19	12–15	102–99	
1 Oct	17:45	Kathmandu Spikers	3–1	Chitwan Shakti	21–25	25–10	25–22	25–17		96–74	
1 Oct	19:45	Lalitpur Queens	3–1	Madhesh United	25–15	26–24	24–26	25–22		100–87	
2 Oct	15:45	Lalitpur Queens	0–3	Karnali Yashvis	22–25	22–25	27–29			71–79	
2 Oct	17:45	Kathmandu Spikers	3–1	Gandaki Thunders	25–23	19–25	25–21	25–16		94–85	
2 Oct	19:45	Chitwan Shakti	3–1	Madhesh United	25–20	25–19	19–25	25–21		94–85	
3 Oct	15:45	Kathmandu Spikers	3–1	Madhesh United	15–25	25–23	25–15	25–18		90–81	
3 Oct	17:45	Chitwan Shakti	2–3	Karnali Yashvis	25–21	18–25	25–21	15–25	13–15	96–107	
3 Oct	19:45	Lalitpur Queens	2–3	Gandaki Thunders	29–27	23–25	12–25	25–13	6–15	95–105	
4 Oct	15:45	Lalitpur Queens	3–1	Chitwan Shakti	20–25	25–21	25–16	25–19		95–81	
4 Oct	17:45	Madhesh United	0–3	Gandaki Thunders	16–25	19–25	18–25			53–75	
4 Oct	19:45	Kathmandu Spikers	1–3	Karnali Yashvis	25–23	14–25	23–25	12–25		74–98	

=== Finals ===
Date	Time		Score		Set 1	Set 2	Set 3	Set 4	Set 5	Total	Report
5 Oct	17:30	Karnali Yashvis	3-2	Lalitpur Queens	25–17	25–20	12–25	18–25	15–13	95–100	

== Final standings ==
Rank	Team
1st place, gold medalist(s)	Karnali Yashvis
2nd place, silver medalist(s)	Lalitpur Queens
3	Kathmandu Spikers
4	Gandaki Thunders
5	Chitwan Shakti
6	Madhesh United

2024 Champions

Maiden title

== Awards ==
=== Player of the match ===
Match no.	Player of the match	
Match no.	Player	Team
1	(Thailand) Waranya Srilaoong	Lalitpur Queens
2	(Greece) Athanasia Liagki	Karnali Yashvis
3	(Nepal) Salina Budha Magar	Chitwan Shakti
4	(Turkey) Zeynep Outran	Karnali Yashvis
5	(Turkey) Pelin Eroktay	Kathmandu Spikers
6	(Thailand) Pattrathip Santrakoon (Nepal) Punam Chand (shared award)	Lalitpur Queens
7	(United States) Gabrielle Benda	Karnali Yashvis
8	(Turkey) Fulden Ural	Kathmandu Spikers
9	(India) KP Anushree	Chitwan Shakti
10	(Nepal) Usha Bhandari	Kathmandu Spikers
11	(Nepal) Sumitra Regmi	Karnali Yashvis
12	(Nepal) Saraswoti Chaudhary	Gandaki Thunders
13	(Thailand) Waranya Srilaoong (2)	Lalitpur Queens
14	(Russia) Alisa Trubyuk	Gandaki Thunders
15	(Turkey) Zeynep Outran (2)	Karnali Yashvis
16	(Turkey) Zeynep Outran (3)	Karnali Yashvis
