= 2025 Everest Women's Volleyball League =

- League: Everest Women's Volleyball League
- Sport: Women's volleyball
- Duration: 5 – 13 September
- Teams: 6

2025
- Season MVP: (Nepal) Sumitra Regmi

Finals
- Champions: Karnali Yashvis (2nd title)
- Runners-up: Lalitpur Queens
- Finals MVP: (Nepal) Jasana Mahato

Everest Women's Volleyball League seasons
- 2024 2026

2025 Everest Women's Volleyball League (also known as EWVL 2025 or Vatsalya EWVL 2025) is the second season of the Everest Women's Volleyball League, a franchise-based Nepalese volleyball league organized by Infinity Dreams Pvt. Ltd. and the Nepal Volleyball Association. The tournament with six teams was originally scheduled from 5 to 13 September 2025 at the Pokhara Rangasala Indoor Hall.The league carries the name Vatsalya EWVL 2025 due to its title sponsorship by Vatsalya.

However, the league was later postponed due to the nationwide Gen Z protest in Nepal, which caused widespread disruptions and safety concerns during the event. Reports stated that some violence and arson had occurred near the hotel where foreign players were staying, forcing the organizers to halt the league for security reasons. Following the postponement, the organizers announced that the remaining matches would be held in the Dasarath Stadium Covered Hall, Kathmandu from 12 to 15 November 2025.

Defending champions Karnali Yashvis defeated Lalitpur Queens by 3–2 sets (26–24, 25–17, 13–25, 17–25, 15–8) in the final to secure their second consecutive EWVL title.

== Personnel and kits ==
Team	General manager	Coach	Marquee player/captain	Kit manufacturer	Shirt sponsors
Karnali Yashvis		(Nepal) Kumar Rai	(Nepal) Sumitra Regmi		
Kathmandu Spikers	(Nepal) Kapil G. C.	(Nepal) Lok Bahadur Budha	(Nepal) Usha Bhandari		
Lalitpur Queens	(Nepal) Utsav Shakya	(Nepal) Utshav Khadka	(Nepal) Salina Shrestha	Kelme	Rupse Holidays
Lumbini Lavas		(Nepal) Bharat Yadav	(Nepal) Aruna Shahi		
Madhesh United		(Nepal) Kopila Upreti	(Nepal) Niruta Thagunna		
Pokhara Ninjas	(Nepal) Vikash Khetan	(Nepal) Rupesh Kumar Bista	(Nepal) Pragati Nath		

== Rosters ==
Players were selected through auction, which is happened for the first time in Nepal's Volleyball history.

Karnali Yashvis
No.	Name	Height	Position
2	(Nepal) Sumitra Regmi (C)	6' 1"	Middle blocker
10	(Nepal) Safiya Pun		Middle Blocker
1	(Nepal) Rasmita Dura		Libero
3	(Nepal) Jasna Mahato		Setter
4	(Nepal) Puja Tharu	5' 6"	Spiker
17	(Nepal) Nebika Chaudhary		
6	(Nepal) Rebika Lama Tamang		
8	(Nepal) Elisha Bhuju		
13	(Brazil) Ana Flávia Galvão	6' 1"	Setter
11	(Brazil) Mayra De Souza	6' 0"	Spiker
5	(Greece) Evangelina Chantava	6' 2"	Spiker
18	(Nepal) Reshu Shahi (talent hunt)		
Head coach		(Nepal) Kumar Rai	

Kathmandu Spikers
No.	Name	Height	Position
6	(Nepal) Usha Bhandari (C)	5' 7"	Outside spiker
7	(Nepal) Kabita Bhatta	5' 7"	Middle blocker
3	(Nepal) Manisha Chaudhary		Blocker
21	(Nepal) Yamuna Rasaili		Libero
16	(Nepal) Rima Kunwar	5' 5"	Spiker
1	(Nepal) Balmika Acharya		Blocker
10	(Nepal) Kamala Pun		Setter
7	(Nepal) Ashika Chettri		Spiker
4	(Bulgaria) Polina Neykova	5'10"	Setter
19	(Thailand) Apinya Pratibatthong	5' 11"	Spiker
79	(Thailand) Kanchana Sisaikaeo	5' 11"	Spiker
20	(Nepal) Anisha Tharu (talent hunt)		
9	(Nepal) Bhubaneswori Chand (talent hunt)		
Head coach		(Nepal) Lok Bahadur Budha	

Lalitpur Queens
No.	Name	Height	Position
18	(Nepal) Salina Shrestha (C)		Libero
11	(Nepal) Sangam Mahato	5' 6"	Middle blocker
15	(Nepal) Salina Budha Magar		Spiker
8	(Nepal) Laxmi Chand	5' 8"	Spiker
3	(Nepal) Sunita Rai		Spiker
9	(Nepal) Nisha Chaudhary		Spiker
10	(Nepal) Shristi Khadgi		Spiker
1	(Nepal) Bhawana Dangi		Spiker
7	(Thailand) Darin Pinsuwan		Spiker
24	(Thailand) Pattrathip Santrakoon	5' 6"	Setter
16	(Thailand) Waranya Srilaoong	5' 10"	Spiker
17	(Nepal) Shanti Kala Rai (talent hunt)		
Head coach		(Nepal) Utshav Khadka	

Lumbini Lavas
No.	Name	Height	Position
5	(Nepal) Aruna Shahi (C)	5' 8"	Setter
11	(Nepal) Kamana Bista		Spiker
4	(Nepal) Alisa Manandhar		Blocker
18	(Nepal) Shanti Kala Tamang		Libero
3	(Nepal) Jenisha Biswokarma		Spiker
10	(Nepal) Roma Mahato		
9	(Nepal) Anusha Chaudhary		Setter
23	(Nepal) Ranjana Bote		
33	(Nepal) Janaki KC		
13	(Russia) Veronika Zubareva	6' 3"	Spiker
8	(Russia) Kseniya Tishina-Rayzer	6' 2"	Blocker
7	(Kyrgyzstan) Ogulai Kudaikulova	5' 9"	Spiker
Head coach		(Nepal) Bharat Yadav	

Madhesh United
No.	Name	Height	Position
1	(Nepal) Niruta Thagunna (C)	5' 5"	Spiker
11	(Nepal) Aarati Subedi	5' 10"	Spiker
8	(Nepal) Kopila Rana		Blocker
9	(Nepal) Saraswoti Kattel		Setter
12	(Nepal) Usha Bist		Middle blocker
14	(Nepal) Babita Bohara		
5	(Nepal) Basanti Saud		Blocker
6	(Nepal) Sneha Thagunna	5' 9"	Middle blocker
7	(Netherlands) Romee Veenstra	6' 2"	Spiker
10	(Netherlands) Danique Aardema		Setter
3	(Netherlands) Kirsten Wessels		
2	(Nepal) Tulshi Chaudhary (talent hunt)		
Head coach		(Nepal) Kopila Upreti	

Pokhara Ninjas
No.	Name	Height	Position
14	(Nepal) Pragati Nath (C)	5' 7"	Setter
5	(Nepal) Punam Chand		Open spiker
6	(Nepal) Mina Sunar		Blocker
9	(Nepal) Sunita Khatri		
16	(Nepal) Garima Bohora		Spiker
11	(Nepal) Anjila Pradhan		Libero
12	(Nepal) Nisha Mahar		Spiker
17	(Nepal) Bhawana Tamang		Setter
8	(Romania) Ana-Maria Berdilă	5' 11"	Spiker
10	(United States) Adeola Owokoniran	6' 3"	Spiker
7	(Croatia) Lea Boban	6' 3"	Blocker
20	(Nepal) Girishma Gurung (talent hunt)		
Head coach		(Nepal) Rupesh Kumar Bista	

== League standings ==
Win by 3–0: 3 points
Win by other margin: 2 points
Loss by 0–3: 0 points
Loss by other margin:1 points

If the teams are level on points, the number of sets won will be taken into consideration. The top two teams at the end of the league stage will move into the finals.

Pos	Team	Pld	W	L	Pts	SW	SL	SR	SPW	SPL	SPR	Qualification
1	Karnali Yashvis	5	5	0	13	15	2	7.500	425	356	1.194	Qualified for Final
2	Lalitpur Queens	5	3	2	10	10	6	1.667	377	336	1.122	Qualified for Final
3	Kathmandu Spikers	5	3	2	6	9	10	0.900	436	416	1.048	
4	Lumbini Lavas	5	2	3	6	9	12	0.750	431	468	0.921	
5	Pokhara Ninjas	5	1	4	5	6	12	0.500	369	393	0.939	
6	Madhesh United	5	1	4	5	5	12	0.417	351	413	0.850	

Updated to match(es) played on 6 September 2025. Source: EWVL Official

== League stage ==
Date	Time		Score		Set 1	Set 2	Set 3	Set 4	Set 5	Total	Report
5 Sep	14:00	Karnali Yashvis	3–0	Pokhara Ninjas	25–21	25–20	25–14			75–55	
5 Sep	16:00	Lalitpur Queens	3–0	Madhesh United	25–17	25–13	25–19			75–49	
6 Sep	13:00	Lalitpur Queens	3–0	Kathmandu Spikers	25–19	25–23	25–21			75–63	
6 Sep	15:00	Karnali Yashvis	3–1	Lumbini Lavas	23–25	25–21	25–17	25–22		98–85	
6 Sep	17:00	Pokhara Ninjas	0–3	Madhesh United	19–25	19–25	23–25			61–75	
7 Sep	14:00	Kathmandu Spikers	3–1	Madhesh United	26–24	23–25	25–22	25–19		99–90	
7 Sep	16:00	Lumbini Lavas	3–2	Pokhara Ninjas	25–13	23–25	10–25	28–26	15–10	101–99	
8 Sep	14:00	Karnali Yashvis	3–0	Kathmandu Spikers	25–22	29–27	28–26			82–75	
8 Sep	16:00	Lalitpur Queens	3–0	Lumbini Lavas	25–13	25–20	25–21			75–54	
12 Nov	15:00	Karnali Yashvis	3–0	Madhesh United	25–15	25–12	25–17			75–44	
12 Nov	17:00	Lalitpur Queens	0–3	Pokhara Ninjas	22–25	13–25	20–25			55–75	
13 Nov	15:00	Kathmandu Spikers	3–1	Pokhara Ninjas	25–19	25–17	12–25	25–18		87–79	
13 Nov	17:00	Lumbini Lavas	3–1	Madhesh United	28–26	23–25	25–14	25–19		101–84	
14 Nov	15:00	Kathmandu Spikers	3–2	Lumbini Lavas	23–25	24–26	25–17	25–16	15–6	112–90	
14 Nov	17:00	Karnali Yashvis	3–1	Lalitpur Queens	17–25	26–24	25–23	27–25		95–97	

=== Finals ===
Date	Time		Score		Set 1	Set 2	Set 3	Set 4	Set 5	Total	Report
15 Nov	17:00	Karnali Yashvis	3–2	Lalitpur Queens	26–24	25–17	13–25	17–25	15–8	96–99	

== Final standings ==
Rank	Team
1st place, gold medalist(s)	Karnali Yashvis
2nd place, silver medalist(s)	Lalitpur Queens
3	Kathmandu Spikers
4	Lumbini Lavas
5	Pokhara Ninjas
6	Madhesh United

2025 Champions

Second title

== Awards ==
=== Player of the match ===
Match no.	Player of the match	
Match no.	Player	Team
1	(Greece) Evangelina Chantava	Karnali Yashvis
2	(Thailand) Waranya Srilaoong	Lalitpur Queens
3	(Thailand) Darin Pinsuwan	Lalitpur Queens
4	(Brazil) Mayra De Souza	Karnali Yashvis
5	(Netherlands) Romee Veenstra	Madhesh United
6	(Thailand) Kanchana Sisaikaeo	Kathmandu Spikers
7	(Russia) Veronika Zubareva	Lumbini Lavas
8	(Brazil) Ana Flávia Galvão	Karnali Yashvis
9	(Thailand) Pattrathip Santrakoon	Lalitpur Queens
10	(Nepal) Safiya Pun	Karnali Yashvis
11	(Nepal) Nisha Mahar	Pokhara Ninjas
12	(Nepal) Usha Bhandari	Kathmandu Spikers
13	(Nepal) Kamana Bista	Lumbini Lavas
14	(Nepal) Rima Kunwar	Kathmandu Spikers
15	(Nepal) Sumitra Regmi	Karnali Yashvis
Final	(Nepal) 𝐉𝐀𝐒𝐀𝐍𝐀 𝐌𝐀𝐇𝐀𝐓𝐎	Karnali Yashvis

== Best of Season ==
Award	Player	Team
Best Server	(Nepal) Safiya Pun	Karnali Yashvis
Most Valuable Player	(Nepal) Sumitra Regmi	Karnali Yashvis
Best Setter	(Nepal) Aruna Shahi	Lumbini Lavas
Best Libero	(Nepal) Salina Shrestha	Lalitpur Queens
Best Spiker	(Nepal) Usha Bhandari	Kathmandu Spikers
