= Lalitpur Queens =

Nepalese volleyball team

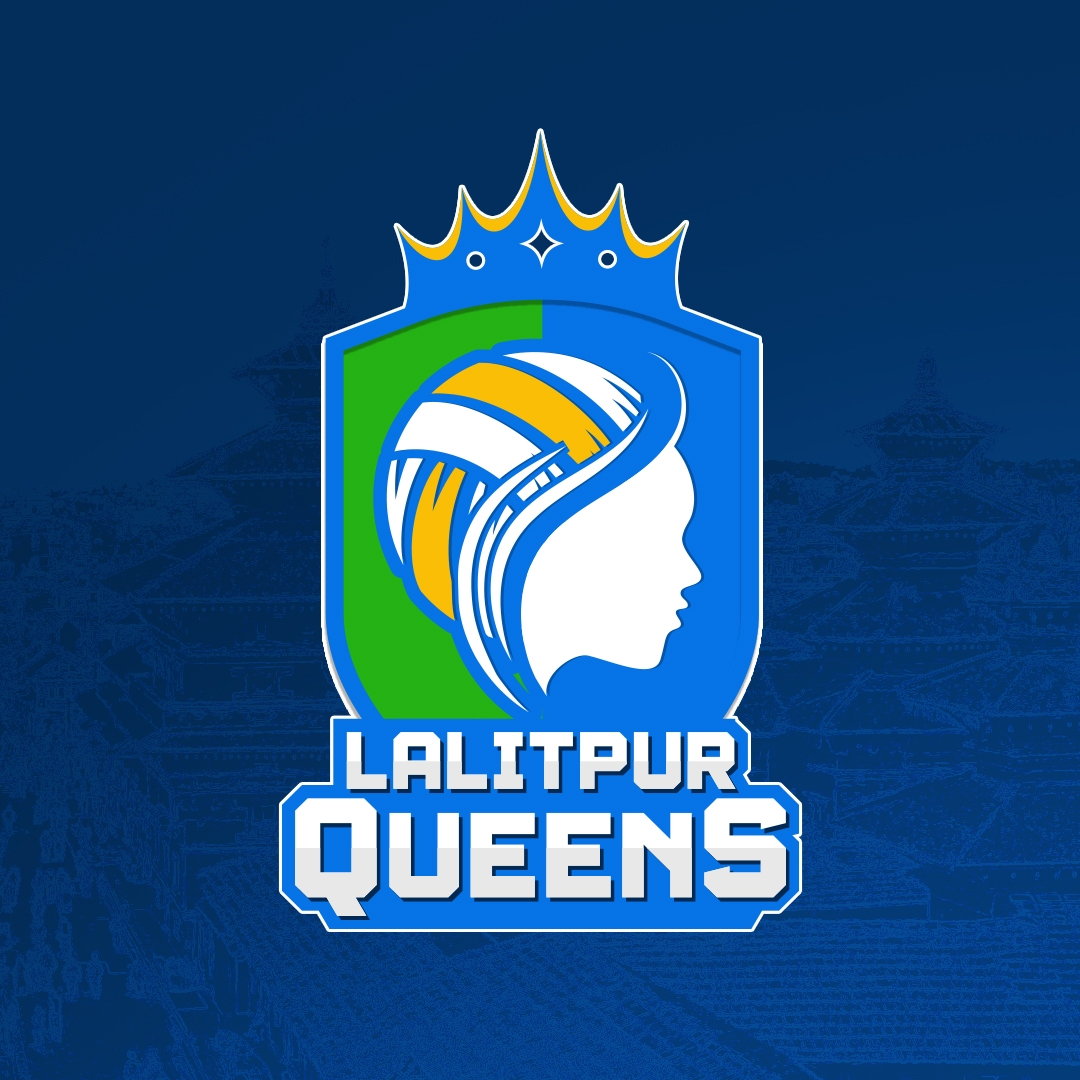
- Founded: 2024; 1 year ago
- Owner: Rupse Sports Management Pvt. Ltd.
- Coach: Utsav Khadka
- Captain: Salina Shrestha
- League: Everest Women's Volleyball League
- 2024, 2025: (silver) Runners-Up
- Website: Club home page

Uniforms
Home	Away

Lalitpur Queens is a women's volleyball team from Lalitpur, Bagmati, playing in the Everest Women's Volleyball League (EWVL) in Nepal. The team was founded in 2024 and is owned by Rupse Sports Management Pvt. Ltd. Ayasha Shakya, triple gold medalist in SAG, has been appointed as team's goodwill ambassador. Lalitpur Queens began their EWVL journey by defeating local rivals Kathmandu Spikers in the opening match of the EWVL inaugural edition.

== Honors ==
=== Domestic ===
- Everest Women's Volleyball League

Runners-up (2): 2024, 2025

== Squad ==
=== 2025 ===
No.	Name	Height	Position
18	(Nepal) Salina Shrestha (C)	4' 9"	Libero
11	(Nepal) Sangam Mahato	5' 8"	Middle blocker
15	(Nepal) Salina Budha Magar		Outside Hitter
8	(Nepal) Laxmi Chand	5' 6"	Opposite Hitter
3	(Nepal) Sunita Rai		Setter
9	(Nepal) Nisha Chaudhary		Middle blocker
10	(Nepal) Shristi Khadgi		Outside Hitter
1	(Nepal) Bhawana Dangi		Opposite Hitter
17	(Nepal) Shanti Kala Rai		Opposite Hitter
7	(Thailand) Darin Pinsuwan		Outside Hitter
16	(Thailand) Waranya Srilaoong		Outside Hitter
24	(Thailand) Pattrathip Santrakoon		Setter

=== 2024 ===
No.	Name	Height	Position
18	(Nepal) Salina Shrestha (C)	4' 9"	Libero
11	(Nepal) Kamana Bista	5' 7"	Opposite Hitter
8	(Nepal) Punam Chand		Outside Hitter
10	(Nepal) Safiya Pun	5' 8"	Middle blocker
4	(Nepal) Anusha Chaudhary		Setter
1	(Nepal) Nisha Chaudhary		Middle blocker
17	(Nepal) Bhawana Tamang		Setter
2	(Nepal) Neha Chaudhary		Outside Hitter
7	(Nepal) Jacquisha Thapa		Outside Hitter
16	(Thailand) Waranya Srilaoong		Outside Hitter
24	(Thailand) Pattrathip Santrakoon		Setter
19	(Thailand) Sutadta Chuewulim		Outside Hitter

== Technical staff ==
Position	Name
Owner	Rupse Sports Management Pvt. Ltd.
Coach	Utsav Khadka
Assistant coach	Yugesh Hamal
Media officer	Abiskar Bikram Rai
General manager	Utsav Shakya
Team photographer	Safal KC

== Notable players ==
- (Thailand) Sutadta Chuewulim
- (Thailand) Waranya Srilaoong
- (Thailand) Pattrathip Santrakoon
- (Thailand) Darin Pinsuwan

== League results ==
Champion Runner-up

League		Position	Teams	Matches	Win	Lose
Everest Women's Volleyball League
Everest Women's Volleyball League	2024	Runner-up	6	6	3	3

League		Position	Teams	Matches	Win	Lose
Everest Women's Volleyball League
Everest Women's Volleyball League	2025	Runner-up	6	6	3	3

== Results by season ==
EWVL 2024, Kathmandu
	Date	VS	Result	Set 1	Set 2	Set 3	Set 4	Set 5	POTM
Group Stage	Sept 30, 2024	Kathmandu Spikers	3-1	25-10	21-25	25-21	25-19		Waranya Srilaoong
Group Stage	Oct 1, 2024	Madhesh United	3-1	25-15	26-24	24-26	25-22		Pattrathip Santrakoon
Group Stage	Oct 2, 2024	Karnali Yashvis	0-3	22-25	22-25	27-29			
Group Stage	Oct 3, 2024	Gandaki Thunders	2-3	29-27	23-25	12-25	25-13	6-15	
Group Stage	Oct 4, 2025	Chitwan Shakti	3-1	20-25	25-21	25-16	25-19		Waranga Srilaoong
Final	Oct 5, 2025	Karnali Yashvis	2-3	17-25	20-25	25-12	25-18	13-15	

EWVL 2025, Pokhara & Kathmandu
	Date	VS	Result	Set 1	Set 2	Set 3	Set 4	Set 5	POTM
Group Stage	Sept 5, 2025	Madhesh United	3-0	25-17	25-13	25-19			Waranya Srilaoong
Group Stage	Sept 6, 2025	Kathmandu Spikers	3-0	25-19	25-13	25-21			Darin Pinsuwan
Group Stage	Sept 8, 2025	Lumbini Lavas	3-0	25-13	25-20	25-21			Pattrathip Santrakoon
Group Stage	Nov 12, 2025	Pokhara Ninjas	0-3	22-25	13-25	20-25			
Group Stage	Nov 14, 2025	Karnali Yashvis	1-3	25-17	24-26	23-25	25-27		
Final	Nov 15, 2025	Karnali Yashvis	2-3	24-26	17-25	25-13	25-17	8-15	

== Club Player award ==
Season	Player	Award
2025	Salina Shrestha	Best Liberio
2025	Sangam Mahato	Best Middle Blocker

== Sponsors ==
Year	Title Sponsor	Co-Sponsor	Consultancy Partner	Driven By	Banking Partner	Education Partner	Kits Partner	Medical Partner
2025	Rupse Holidays	IGI Prudential Insurance Limited	Bon Consultancy	Honda	Global IME Bank	Rajarshi Gurukul	Kelme	HAMS Hospital
