= Volleyball at the 2022 Asian Games – Women's tournament =

Women's volleyball tournament won by China

Women at the 2022 Asian Games
- Venue: Deqing Sports Centre Gymnasium; HNU Cangqian Gymnasium
- Date: 30 September – 7 October 2023
- Competitors: 154 from 13 nations

Medalists
gold medal	China
silver medal	Japan
bronze medal	Thailand

The women's tournament in volleyball at the 2022 Asian Games was the 19th edition of the event at an Asian Games, organised by the Asian Volleyball Confederation in conjunction with the OCA. To avoid a clash of dates with the 2023 FIVB Volleyball Women's Olympic Qualification Tournaments, the women's tournament was allocated to the last week of the Games. The event was held in Hangzhou, China from 30 September to 7 October 2023.

== Squads ==
Afghanistan	China	Chinese Taipei	Hong Kong
Negin Mohammadi; Zeinab Jalili; Mohaddese Amiri; Mursal Khedri; Halima Hassani; Narwand Mohammadi; Fatemeh Bagheri; Zahra Moradi; Narges Mosavi; Fateme Heydari; Roghayeh Mohammadi; Fareshta Karimi	Yuan Xinyue; Diao Linyu; Gao Yi; Gong Xiangyu; Wang Yuanyuan; Wang Yunlu; Zhong Hui; Li Yingying; Zheng Yixin; Ding Xia; Wang Mengjie; Wu Mengjie	Lai Xiang-chen; Chang Li-wen; Wu Fang-yu; Chiu Ya-hui; Lin Shu-ho; Kan Ko-hui; Hsu Wan-yun; Liao Yi-jen; Huang Man-ya; Lin Ching-yi; Chen Tzu-ya; Hu Xiao-pei	Michelle Cheung; Fung Tsz Yan; Yeung Sau Mei; Chim Wing Lam; Pang Wing Lam; Yu Ying Chi; To Wing Man; Ngai Kwai Ting; Koo Yung Yung; Yim Wing Ni; Lam Yee Ting; Ho Kin Yiu
India	Japan	Kazakhstan	Mongolia
Shaalini Saravanan; Aswathi Raveendran; N. S. Saranya; Soorya S. Pillai; Jini Kovat Shaji; Aswani Kandoth; Nirmal Tanwar Bhati; Jincy Johnson; R. S. Shilpa; Minimol Abraham; Suji Vijayan	Koyomi Iwasaki; Haruyo Shimamura; Yuka Sato; Yuka Meguro; Minami Uesaka; Mizuki Tanaka; Miwako Osanai; Erina Ogawa; Miyu Nakagawa; Tsukasa Nakagawa; Yuki Nishikawa; Shion Hirayama	Sana Anarkulova; Zarina Sitkazinova; Nailya Nigmatulina; Valeriya Chumak; Kristina Strukova; Madina Beket; Tatyana Nikitina; Kristina Anikonova; Tomiris Sagimbayeva; Natalya Smirnova; Kristina Belova; Dinara Kozhanberdina	Gan-Ochiryn Khongorzul; Pürevsürengiin Enkhkhüslen; Ganboldyn Enkhnaran; Dashdavaagiin Sosorburam; Naranbaataryn Baasanjav; Lkhagvadorjiin Khosbayar; Ganboldyn Tsetsegjargal; Enkhboldyn Khüslen; Sansarboldyn Temüülen; Namshiryn Mönkhzayaa; Bayarchuluuny Nasanjargal
Nepal	North Korea	South Korea	Thailand
Niruta Thagunna; Janaki Bhandari; Saraswoti Chaudhary; Aruna Shahi; Usha Bhandari; Kamana Bista; Sangam Mahato; Safiya Pun; Pratibha Mali; Punam Chand; Kabita Bhatta; Salina Shrestha	Kim Hyon-a; Uh Ryong-gyong; Pyon Rim-hyang; Kim Jin-hyang; Son Hyang-mi; Kim Kuk-hwa; Ri Jong-hyang; Rim Hyang; Choe Pok-hyang; Kim Hyon-ju; Jo Sin-gum; Ri Ra-hyang	Lee Ju-ah; Kim Da-in; Park Eun-jin; Kim Ji-won; Kim Yeon-gyeon; Moon Jung-won; Park Jeong-ah; Lee Da-hyeon; Lee Seon-woo; Jung Ho-young; Pyo Seung-ju; Kang So-hwi	Wipawee Srithong; Piyanut Pannoy; Pornpun Guedpard; Thatdao Nuekjang; Hattaya Bamrungsuk; Pimpichaya Kokram; Sasipaporn Janthawisut; Ajcharaporn Kongyot; Chatchu-on Moksri; Thanacha Sooksod; Sirima Manakij; Jarasporn Bundasak
Vietnam			
Trần Thị Thanh Thúy; Phạm Thị Nguyệt Anh; Trần Thị Bích Thủy; Hoàng Thị Kiều Trinh; Nguyễn Khánh Đang; Võ Thị Kim Thoa; Nguyễn Thị Trinh; Vi Thị Như Quỳnh; Đoàn Thị Xuân; Đoàn Thị Lâm Oanh; Trần Tú Linh; Lý Thị Luyến			

== Results ==
All times are China Standard Time (UTC+08:00)

Legend

- WO — Won by walkover

=== Preliminary round ===
==== Pool A ====
Pos	Team	Pld	W	L	Pts	SW	SL	SR	SPW	SPL	SPR	Qualification
1	China	2	2	0	6	6	0	MAX	150	63	2.381	Classification / Pool E–F
2	North Korea	2	1	1	3	3	4	0.750	134	155	0.865	Classification / Pool E–F
3	India	2	0	2	0	1	6	0.167	107	173	0.618	Classification / Pool G–H

Source: OCA

Date	Time	Venue		Score		Set 1	Set 2	Set 3	Set 4	Set 5	Total	Report
30 Sep	10:30	Deqing	India	1–3	North Korea	25–23	22–25	17–25	16–25		80–98	Report
01 Oct	19:00	Deqing	China	3–0	India	25–9	25–9	25–9			75–27	Report
02 Oct	19:00	Deqing	North Korea	0–3	China	13–25	15–25	8–25			36–75	Report

==== Pool B ====
Pos	Team	Pld	W	L	Pts	SW	SL	SR	SPW	SPL	SPR	Qualification
1	Thailand	2	2	0	6	6	1	6.000	174	115	1.513	Classification / Pool E–F
2	Chinese Taipei	2	1	1	3	4	3	1.333	144	138	1.043	Classification / Pool E–F
3	Mongolia	2	0	2	0	0	6	0.000	85	150	0.567	Classification / Pool G–H

Source: OCA

Date	Time	Venue		Score		Set 1	Set 2	Set 3	Set 4	Set 5	Total	Report
30 Sep	19:00	Deqing	Chinese Taipei	3–0	Mongolia	25–19	25–12	25–8			75–39	Report
01 Oct	14:30	Deqing	Thailand	3–1	Chinese Taipei	25–18	24–26	25–12	25–13		99–69	Report
02 Oct	14:30	Deqing	Mongolia	0–3	Thailand	14–25	20–25	12–25			46–75	Report

==== Pool C ====
Pos	Team	Pld	W	L	Pts	SW	SL	SR	SPW	SPL	SPR	Qualification
1	Vietnam	2	2	0	5	6	2	3.000	178	138	1.290	Classification / Pool E–F
2	South Korea	2	1	1	4	5	3	1.667	180	149	1.208	Classification / Pool E–F
3	Nepal	2	0	2	0	0	6	0.000	79	150	0.527	Classification / Pool G–H

Source: OCA

Date	Time	Venue		Score		Set 1	Set 2	Set 3	Set 4	Set 5	Total	Report
30 Sep	14:30	Deqing	Vietnam	3–0	Nepal	25–4	25–16	25–13			75–33	Report
01 Oct	10:30	HNUC	South Korea	2–3	Vietnam	25–16	25–22	22–25	22–25	11–15	105–103	Report
02 Oct	10:30	HNUC	Nepal	0–3	South Korea	21–25	14–25	11–25			46–75	Report

==== Pool D ====
Pos	Team	Pld	W	L	Pts	SW	SL	SR	SPW	SPL	SPR	Qualification
1	Japan	3	3	0	9	9	0	MAX	225	99	2.273	Classification / Pool E–F
2	Kazakhstan	3	2	1	6	6	3	2.000	200	127	1.575	Classification / Pool E–F
3	Hong Kong	3	1	2	3	3	6	0.500	157	162	0.969	Classification / Pool G–H
4	Afghanistan	3	0	3	0	0	9	0.000	31	225	0.138	Classification / Pool G–H

Source: OCA

Date	Time	Venue		Score		Set 1	Set 2	Set 3	Set 4	Set 5	Total	Report
30 Sep	14:30	HNUC	Japan	3–0	Hong Kong	25–17	25–10	25–15			75–42	Report
30 Sep	19:00	HNUC	Kazakhstan	3–0	Afghanistan	25–4	25–5	25–3			75–12	Report
01 Oct	14:30	HNUC	Hong Kong	0–3	Kazakhstan	13–25	12–25	15–25			40–75	Report
01 Oct	19:00	HNUC	Afghanistan	0–3	Japan	2–25	0–25	5–25			7–75	Report
02 Oct	14:30	HNUC	Japan	3–0	Kazakhstan	25–17	25–20	25–13			75–50	Report
02 Oct	19:00	HNUC	Afghanistan	0–3	Hong Kong	2–25	7–25	3–25			12–75	Report

=== Classification ===
- The results and the points of the matches between the same teams that were already played during the preliminary round shall be taken into account for the classification.

==== Pool E ====
Pos	Team	Pld	W	L	Pts	SW	SL	SR	SPW	SPL	SPR	Qualification
1	China	3	3	0	9	9	0	MAX	225	122	1.844	Semifinals
2	Vietnam	3	2	1	5	6	6	1.000	235	264	0.890	Semifinals
3	South Korea	3	1	2	4	5	7	0.714	248	253	0.980	Classification 5th–8th
4	North Korea	3	0	3	0	2	9	0.222	195	264	0.739	Classification 5th–8th

Source: OCA

Date	Time	Venue		Score		Set 1	Set 2	Set 3	Set 4	Set 5	Total	Report
04 Oct	14:30	HNUC	Vietnam	3–1	North Korea	25–17	25–20	20–25	25–22		95–84	Report
04 Oct	19:00	HNUC	China	3–0	South Korea	25–12	25–21	25–16			75–49	Report
05 Oct	14:30	HNUC	North Korea	1–3	South Korea	25–19	21–25	9–25	20–25		75–94	Report
05 Oct	19:00	HNUC	China	3–0	Vietnam	25–13	25–13	25–11			75–37	Report

==== Pool F ====
Pos	Team	Pld	W	L	Pts	SW	SL	SR	SPW	SPL	SPR	Qualification
1	Japan	3	3	0	9	9	1	9.000	246	194	1.268	Semifinals
2	Thailand	3	2	1	6	6	4	1.500	239	185	1.292	Semifinals
3	Chinese Taipei	3	1	2	3	5	7	0.714	239	276	0.866	Classification 5th–8th
4	Kazakhstan	3	0	3	0	1	9	0.111	172	241	0.714	Classification 5th–8th

Source: OCA

Date	Time	Venue		Score		Set 1	Set 2	Set 3	Set 4	Set 5	Total	Report
04 Oct	14:30	Deqing	Thailand	3–0	Kazakhstan	25–18	25–12	25–11			75–41	Report
04 Oct	19:00	Deqing	Japan	3–1	Chinese Taipei	25–15	21–25	25–18	25–21		96–79	Report
05 Oct	14:30	Deqing	Chinese Taipei	3–1	Kazakhstan	16–25	25–15	25–23	25–18		91–81	Report
05 Oct	19:00	Deqing	Thailand	0–3	Japan	23–25	19–25	23–25			65–75	Report

==== Pool G ====
Pos	Team	Pld	W	L	Pts	SW	SL	SR	SPW	SPL	SPR	Qualification
1	India	1	1	0	3	3	1	3.000	101	91	1.110	Classification 9th–12th
2	Nepal	1	0	1	0	1	3	0.333	91	101	0.901	Classification 9th–12th

Source: OCA

Date	Time	Venue		Score		Set 1	Set 2	Set 3	Set 4	Set 5	Total	Report
04 Oct	10:30	HNUC	India	3–1	Nepal	25–23	26–28	25–23	25–17		101–91	Report

==== Pool H ====
Pos	Team	Pld	W	L	Pts	SW	SL	SR	SPW	SPL	SPR	Qualification
1	Hong Kong	2	2	0	6	6	1	6.000	169	102	1.657	Classification 9th–12th
2	Mongolia	2	1	1	3	4	3	1.333	165	94	1.755	Classification 9th–12th
3	Afghanistan	2	0	2	0	0	6	0.000	12	150	0.080	

Source: OCA

Date	Time	Venue		Score		Set 1	Set 2	Set 3	Set 4	Set 5	Total	Report
04 Oct	10:30	Deqing	Mongolia	1–3	Hong Kong	21–25	20–25	25–18	24–26		90–94	Report
05 Oct	10:30	Deqing	(WO) Mongolia	3–0	Afghanistan	25–0	25–0	25–0			75–0	Report

=== Classification 9th–12th ===
Semifinals
6 October
India	3
Mongolia	0
6 October
Nepal	0
Hong Kong	3

Classification 9th–10th
7 October
India	3
Hong Kong	2
Classification 11th–12th
7 October
Mongolia	2
Nepal	3

==== Semifinals ====
Date	Time	Venue		Score		Set 1	Set 2	Set 3	Set 4	Set 5	Total	Report
06 Oct	10:30	Deqing	India	3–0	Mongolia	25–16	25–20	25–17			75–53	Report
06 Oct	10:30	HNUC	Nepal	0–3	Hong Kong	22–25	16–25	18–25			56–75	Report

==== Classification 11th–12th ====
Date	Time	Venue		Score		Set 1	Set 2	Set 3	Set 4	Set 5	Total	Report
07 Oct	10:30	Deqing	Mongolia	2–3	Nepal	25–17	18–25	21–25	25–18	12–15	101–100	Report

==== Classification 9th–10th ====
Date	Time	Venue		Score		Set 1	Set 2	Set 3	Set 4	Set 5	Total	Report
07 Oct	10:30	HNUC	India	3–2	Hong Kong	25–18	18–25	20–25	25–19	15–9	103–96	Report

=== Classification 5th–8th ===
Semifinals
6 October
South Korea	3
Kazakhstan	0
6 October
North Korea	1
Chinese Taipei	3

Classification 5th–6th
7 October
South Korea	3
Chinese Taipei	0
Classification 7th–8th
7 October
Kazakhstan	2
North Korea	3

==== Semifinals ====
Date	Time	Venue		Score		Set 1	Set 2	Set 3	Set 4	Set 5	Total	Report
06 Oct	14:30	Deqing	South Korea	3–0	Kazakhstan	25–18	25–18	25–16			75–52	Report
06 Oct	19:00	Deqing	North Korea	1–3	Chinese Taipei	27–29	23–25	25–21	9–25		84–100	Report

==== Classification 7th–8th ====
Date	Time	Venue		Score		Set 1	Set 2	Set 3	Set 4	Set 5	Total	Report
07 Oct	14:30	Deqing	Kazakhstan	2–3	North Korea	9–25	25–18	20–25	25–20	10–15	89–103	Report

==== Classification 5th–6th ====
Date	Time	Venue		Score		Set 1	Set 2	Set 3	Set 4	Set 5	Total	Report
07 Oct	18:30	Deqing	South Korea	3–0	Chinese Taipei	25–21	25–22	25–17			75–60	Report

=== Final round ===
Semifinals
6 October
Vietnam	1
Japan	3
6 October
China	3
Thailand	0

Gold medal match
7 October
Japan	0
China	3
Bronze medal match
7 October
Vietnam	0
Thailand	3

==== Semifinals ====
Date	Time	Venue		Score		Set 1	Set 2	Set 3	Set 4	Set 5	Total	Report
06 Oct	14:30	HNUC	Vietnam	1–3	Japan	24–26	21–25	25–23	16–25		86–99	Report
06 Oct	19:00	HNUC	China	3–0	Thailand	25–21	25–23	25–15			75–59	Report

==== Bronze medal match ====
Date	Time	Venue		Score		Set 1	Set 2	Set 3	Set 4	Set 5	Total	Report
07 Oct	14:30	HNUC	Vietnam	0–3	Thailand	19–25	23–25	20–25			62–75	Report

==== Gold medal match ====
Date	Time	Venue		Score		Set 1	Set 2	Set 3	Set 4	Set 5	Total	Report
07 Oct	19:30	HNUC	Japan	0–3	China	15–25	21–25	21–25			57–75	Report

== Final standing ==
Rank	Team	Pld	W	L
1st place, gold medalist(s)	China	6	6	0
2nd place, silver medalist(s)	Japan	7	6	1
3rd place, bronze medalist(s)	Thailand	6	4	2
4	Vietnam	6	3	3
5	South Korea	6	4	2
6	Chinese Taipei	6	3	3
7	North Korea	6	2	4
8	Kazakhstan	7	2	5
9	India	5	3	2
10	Hong Kong	6	3	3
11	Nepal	5	1	4
12	Mongolia	6	1	5
13	Afghanistan	4	0	4
