= Nepal women's national volleyball team =

National sports team

Nepal
- Association: Nepal Volleyball Association
- Confederation: AVC
- Head coach: (Nepal) Jagdish Bhatta
- FIVB ranking: 106 ▼52 (2 October 2026)

Uniforms
Home	Away
Honours
CAVA Nations League
Silver medal – second place	2024 Kathmandu	Team
CAVA Challenge Cup
Gold medal – first place	2019 Dhaka	Team
Gold medal – first place	2021 Dhaka	Team
Bronze medal – third place	2023 Kathmandu	Team
South Asian Games
Bronze medal – third place	1999 Kathmandu	Team
Bronze medal – third place	2006 Colombo	Team
Silver medal – second place	2010 Dhaka	Team
Bronze medal – third place	2016 Guwahati	Team
Silver medal – second place	2019 Kathmandu/Pokhara	Team

The Nepal women's national volleyball team represents Nepal in international women's volleyball competitions and friendly matches. It is governed by the Nepal Volleyball Association.

== Tournament record ==
=== Asian Games ===
Asian Games record
Year	Position
(China) 2022	11th
(Japan) 2026	

=== CAVA Championship ===
CAVA Championship record
Year	Position
(Nepal) 2024	2nd place, silver medalist(s)
(Uzbekistan) 2025	DNP
(Nepal) 2026	4th

=== CAVA Challenge Cup ===
CAVA Challenge Cup record
Year	Position
(Nepal) 2023	3rd place, bronze medalist(s)

=== AVC Central Asia Zone Championship ===
AVC Central Asia Zone Championship record
Year	Position
(Bangladesh) 2019	1st place, gold medalist(s)
(Bangladesh) 2021	1st place, gold medalist(s)

=== South Asian Games ===
South Asian Games record
Year	Position
(Nepal) 1999	3rd place, bronze medalist(s)
(Sri Lanka) 2006	3rd place, bronze medalist(s)
(Bangladesh) 2010	2nd place, silver medalist(s)
(India) 2016	3rd place, bronze medalist(s)
(Nepal) 2019	2nd place, silver medalist(s)

== Results and schedule ==
=== 2023 ===
22 May 2023; 16:30 UTC+05:45	Kyrgyzstan	0–3 (41–75)	Nepal	Dasarath Stadium Covered Hall, Kathmandu
22 May 2023; 16:30 UTC+05:45	(11-25, 19–25, 11–25,)			Dasarath Stadium Covered Hall, Kathmandu

23 May 2023; 15:00 UTC+05:45	Bangladesh	0–3 (27–75)	Nepal	Dasarath Stadium Covered Hall, Kathmandu
23 May 2023; 15:00 UTC+05:45	(10-25, 8–25, 9–25,)			Dasarath Stadium Covered Hall, Kathmandu

24 May 2023; 15:00 UTC+05:45	India	3–1 (97–82)	Nepal	Dasarath Stadium Covered Hall, Kathmandu
24 May 2023; 15:00 UTC+05:45	(25–12, 26–24, 21–25,25-21)			Dasarath Stadium Covered Hall, Kathmandu

27 May 2023; 12:00 UTC+05:45	Kazakhstan	3–2 (101–85)	Nepal	Dasarath Stadium Covered Hall, Kathmandu
27 May 2023; 12:00 UTC+05:45	(30–28, 16–25, 15–25,25-18, 15-7)			Dasarath Stadium Covered Hall, Kathmandu

28 May 2023; 11:30 UTC+05:45	Nepal	3–1 (95–69)	Uzbekistan	Dasarath Stadium Covered Hall, Kathmandu
28 May 2023; 11:30 UTC+05:45	(20–25, 25–16, 25–15,25-13)			Dasarath Stadium Covered Hall, Kathmandu

30 September 2023; 14:30	Vietnam	3–0	Nepal	Deqing Sports Centre Gymnasium, Hangzhou; Attendance: 1,900; Referees: KOKCHOLOKOV Nurgazy (KGZ), GHARIB Alireza (IRI)
30 September 2023; 14:30	(25–4, 25–16, 25–13); Result			Deqing Sports Centre Gymnasium, Hangzhou; Attendance: 1,900; Referees: KOKCHOLOKOV Nurgazy (KGZ), GHARIB Alireza (IRI)

2 October 2023; 10:30	Nepal	0–3	South Korea	Hangzhou Normal University Cangqian Gymnasium, Hangzhou; Attendance: 4,950; Referees: AKHMETOV Aidos (KAZ), BENOSA Yul (PHI)
2 October 2023; 10:30	(21–25, 14–25, 11–25); Result			Hangzhou Normal University Cangqian Gymnasium, Hangzhou; Attendance: 4,950; Referees: AKHMETOV Aidos (KAZ), BENOSA Yul (PHI)

=== 2024 ===
21 July 2024; 16:00	Nepal	0–3	Russia	Dasarath Stadium Covered Hall, Kathmandu
21 July 2024; 16:00	(17–25, 19–25, 15–25); Friendly Match			Dasarath Stadium Covered Hall, Kathmandu

22 July 2024; 16:00	Nepal	0–3	Russia	Dasarath Stadium Covered Hall, Kathmandu
22 July 2024; 16:00	(14–25, 23–25, 22–25); Friendly Match			Dasarath Stadium Covered Hall, Kathmandu

1 August 2024; 15:15	Nepal	3–0	Sri Lanka	Dasarath Stadium Covered Hall, Kathmandu
1 August 2024; 15:15	(25–19, 25–18, 25–19 ) Group Stage			Dasarath Stadium Covered Hall, Kathmandu

3 August 2024; 15:00	India	2–3	Nepal	Dasarath Stadium Covered Hall, Kathmandu
3 August 2024; 15:00	(18–25, 25-11,17-25, 25-18, 13-15 ) Group Stage			Dasarath Stadium Covered Hall, Kathmandu

4 August 2024; 17:15	Iran	3–2	Nepal	Dasarath Stadium Covered Hall, Kathmandu
4 August 2024; 17:15	(25–16, 16–25, 25–23, 14–25, 15–13); Group Stage			Dasarath Stadium Covered Hall, Kathmandu

5 August 2024; 17:15	Maldives	0–3	Nepal	Dasarath Stadium Covered Hall, Kathmandu
5 August 2024; 17:15	(8–25, 19–25, 18–25); Group Stage			Dasarath Stadium Covered Hall, Kathmandu

6 August 2024; 17:15	Iran	0–3	Nepal	Dasarath Stadium Covered Hall, Kathmandu
6 August 2024; 17:15	(21–25, 26–28, 20–25); Semi Final 2			Dasarath Stadium Covered Hall, Kathmandu

7 August 2024; 17:15	India	3–2	Nepal	Dasarath Stadium Covered Hall, Kathmandu
7 August 2024; 17:15	(23–25, 25–14, 22–25, 22–25, 15–5); Final			Dasarath Stadium Covered Hall, Kathmandu

== Team ==
=== Current squad ===
The following is the roster for the 2026 Central Asia Volleyball Association (CAVA) Women’s Volleyball Championship.

Nepal national women's volleyball team
No.	Players	Position	Club	EWVL Club	Coaches
1	Niruta Thagunna (captain)	Hitter	Nepal APF Club	Madhesh United	Head coach: (Nepal) Jagdish Bhatta
2	Usha Bhandari	Hitter	Nepal Police	Kathmandu Spikers	Assistant coach:
3	Salina Budha Magar	Hitter	(Nepal)	Lalitpur Queens	Manager:
4	Kamana Bista	Hitter	Nepal Police	Lalitpur Queens	
5	Rima Kunwar	Hitter	(Nepal)		
6	Meena Sunar	Hitter	(Nepal)		
7	Sumitra Regmi	Middle Blocker	(Nepal) New Diamond	Karnali Yashvis	
8	Sunita Khatri	Middle Blocker	(Nepal)		
9	Basanti Saud	Middle Blocker	(Nepal)		
10	Alisa Manandhar	Middle Blocker	(Nepal)		
11	Pragati Nath	Setter	(Nepal) New Diamond	Gandaki Thunders	
12	Jasna Mahato	Setter	(Nepal)		
13	Shanti Kala Tamang	Libero	Nepal Police	Madhesh United	
14	Salina Shrestha	Libero	(Nepal) New Diamond	Lalitpur Queens	
