= Lumbini Lavas =

Nepalese volleyball team

- Founded: 2025
- Ground: Lumbini Indoor Volleyball Hall, Butwal (Capacity: 2,500)
- Coach: Bharat Yadav
- Captain: Aruna Shahi
- League: Everest Women's Volleyball League
- 2025: Debut season

Uniforms
Home	Away

Lumbini Lavas (Nepali: लुम्बिनी लाभाज्) is a Nepalese women's volleyball franchise from Butwal, Lumbini that debuted in the second season (2025) of the Everest Women's Volleyball League. The team replaced Chitwan Shakti from the previous season and represents the Lumbini Province region. The team is owned by Lumbini Sports Pvt. Ltd. and is based at the Lumbini Indoor Volleyball Hall in Butwal.

== History ==
Lumbini Lavas was introduced as a new franchise for EWVL 2025 following the exit of Chitwan Shakti. The team aimed to combine experienced Nepali players with international recruits and talent-hunt selections to compete in the franchise league.

== Technical staff ==
Position	Name
Owner	
Head coach	(Nepal) Bharat Yadav
Brand ambassador	(Nepal) Anna Sharma
Main sponsor	KL Dugar Group

== Team (2025) ==
Players were selected through the EWVL player auction, along with a regional talent hunt conducted in Lumbini Province. Additionally, foreign players joined the team through direct personal contracts.

No.	Name	Height	Position	Notes
5	(Nepal) Aruna Shahi	5' 8"	Setter	(C)
11	(Nepal) Kamana Bista		Spiker	
4	(Nepal) Alisa Manandhar		Blocker	
18	(Nepal) Shanti Kala Tamang		Libero	
3	(Nepal) Jenisha Biswokarma		Spiker	
10	(Nepal) Roma Mahato			
9	(Nepal) Anusha Chaudhary		Setter	
23	(Nepal) Ranjana Bote			
33	(Nepal) Janaki KC			Talent Hunt
13	(Russia) Veronika Zubareva	6' 3"	Spiker	International recruit
8	(Russia) Kseniya Tishina-Rayzer	6' 2"	Blocker	International recruit
7	(Kyrgyzstan) Ogulai Kudaikulova	5' 9"	Spiker	International recruit

== Tournament history ==
Key
Champions
Runners-up

=== Everest Women's Volleyball League ===
2025 Everest Women's Volleyball League
Year	Result	Position	P	W	L	Pts	SR	SPR
2025	Round-robin	4/6	5	2	3	6	0.75	0.921
