= Gandaki Thunders =

Defunct Nepalese volleyball team

- Founded: 2024; 2 years ago
- Dissolved: 2024
- Owner: Saurabh Kedia
- Director: Vikash Khetan
- Captain: Saraswoti Chaudhary
- League: Everest Women's Volleyball League
- Website: Club home page

Gandaki Thunders was a women's volleyball team from Pokhara, Gandaki Province, Nepal. The team competed in the inaugural season of the Everest Women's Volleyball League (EWVL) in 2024 and was not included among the franchise teams in the 2025 edition, indicating it did not continue beyond its first season.

== History ==
Gandaki Thunders was founded in 2024 to participate in the first edition of the Everest Women's Volleyball League. In the 2025 EWVL, six franchises competed, and Pokhara Ninjas replaced Gandaki Thunders as the representative team from the region.

== Team ==
Team roster 2024
No.	Name	Height	Position
3	(Nepal) Saraswoti Chaudhary (C)	6' 1"	Outside hitter
14	(Nepal) Pragati Nath	5' 7"	Setter
1	(Nepal) Laxmi Chand	5' 8"	Spiker
16	(Nepal) Rima Kunwar	5' 5"	Spiker
7	(Nepal) Kabita Bhatta	5' 7"	Middle Blocker
8	(Nepal) Aarati Chaudhary	5' 6"	Spiker
6	(Nepal) Sneha Thagunna	5' 9"	Middle Blocker
13	(Nepal) Saraswoti Jaisi	5' 4"	Libero
10	(Russia) Alisa Trubyuk	6' 0"	Opposite Spiker
12	(Russia) Ekaterina Zvyagintsewa	5' 8"	Opposite Hitter
11	(India) Shilpa RS	6' 2"	Middle Blocker
18	(Nepal) Soing Thapa (Talent Hunt)	5' 8"	

== Administration and Support Staff ==
Position	Name
Owner	Saurabh Kedia
Director	Vikash Khetan
Head Coach	(Nepal) Rupesh Kumar Bista
Assistant Coach	(Nepal) Santosh Shreshta
Physio	(Nepal) Shila Giri
