= Ana-Maria Berdilă =

Romanian volleyball player (born 1993)

Personal information
- Nationality: Romanian
- Born: 8 August 1993 (age 33)

Volleyball information
- Current club: Pokhara Ninjas
- Number: 8

Career
Years	Teams
2015	Penicilina Iași

National team
2015	Romania

Ana-Maria Berdilă (born 8 August 1993) is a Romanian female volleyball player. She is part of the Romania women's national volleyball team. She competed at the 2015 Women's European Volleyball Championship. She started senior career with Penicilina Iași.
