= Salina Shrestha =

Nepalese volleyball player (born 1998)

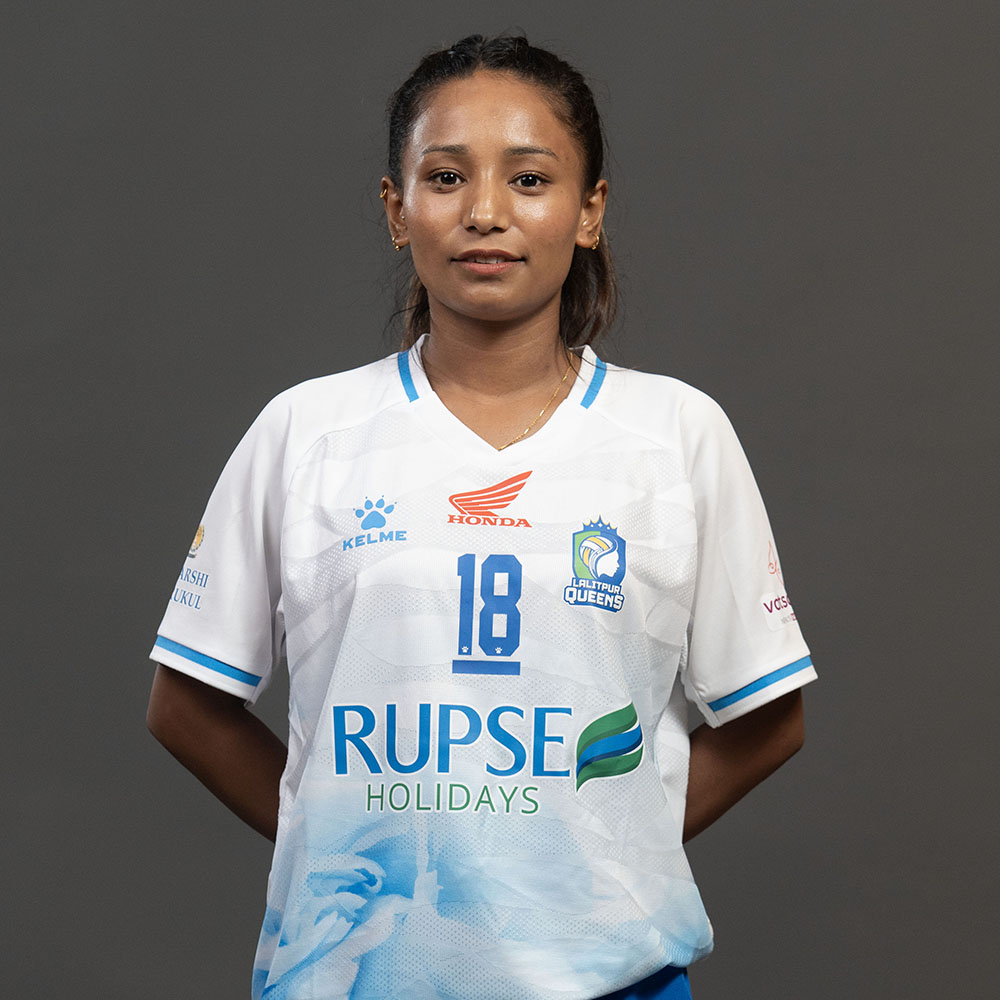

Personal information
- Nickname: Sallu
- Nationality: Nepali
- Born: 8 May 1998 (age 28); Kathmandu, Nepal
- Height: 145 cm (4 ft 9 in)

Volleyball information
- Position: Libero
- Current club: Lalitpur Queens (Captain)
- Number: 18

Career
Years	Teams
2010-	New Diamond Youth Sports Club
2024-	Lalitpur Queens

National team
2019–	Nepal
Medal record
Women's volleyball
Representing Nepal
2019 South Asian Games
Silver medal – second place	2019 Kathmandu	Team
CAVA Women's Volleyball Challenge Cup
Bronze medal – third place	2023 Kathmandu	Team
CAVA Women's Volleyball Nations League
Silver medal – second place	2024 Kathmandu	Team

Salina Shrestha (born May 8, 1998) is a women's professional volleyball player from Nepal. She is a member of the Nepal Women's Volleyball team and plays for Lalitpur Queens in the Everest Women's Volleyball League. Due to her valuable role she has been repeatedly awarded as the best libero in the Central Asian Volleyball Association championships.

== Early life ==
Salina, a student of New Diamond Academy, got introduced to volleyball when she was in Grade 7. New Diamond Academy, led by Kumar Rai, is a household name in Nepali volleyball, renowned for producing top women’s volleyball players.

Salina joined the institution, where Coach Rai recognized her height and potential and advised her to play as a libero, a specialized defensive position in volleyball.

In Nepali volleyball, departmental teams are traditionally considered the strongest. But in 2069 B.S., when New Diamond Academy won the NVA Club Championship by defeating top departmental sides, Salina played a crucial role as a key member of the squad.

However, earning a place in the national team took time. She was called up to the preliminary squad for the 12th South Asian Games in 2016 and the FIVB World Championship Qualifications in 2017, but she could not secure a spot in the final team on both occasions. Still, she did not give up. Salina continued to work hard and, in 2019, finally earned her place in the Nepal National Women’s Volleyball Team. Since then, she has firmly established herself as one of the team’s most valuable players.

== Club Career ==
=== New Diamond Youth Sports Club ===
As a student of New Diamond Academy, she began her volleyball journey with the institution. She first represented New Diamond Academy at the age of 15. Her performances attracted interest from several departmental teams, but she chose to remain with her homegrown club. More than a decade later she continues to represent the club, now known as New Diamond Youth Sports Club.

=== Lalitpur Queens ===
With the introduction of South Asia’s first-ever women’s franchise volleyball tournament, the Everest Women’s Volleyball League (EWVL), in 2024, Salina Shrestha was selected as the marquee player for Lalitpur Queens. Her outstanding performance both on and off the court played a key role in helping the team finish as runners-up in the inaugural season.

Impressed by her impact, Lalitpur Queens retained her as their marquee player for the second season. Although the team once again finished second in the 2025 edition, she was individually recognized with the Best Libero of the Tournament award.

== Personal Accomplishments ==
=== Best Libero ===
- 2019 AVC Central Zone Championship,
- 2023 AVC Central Zone Championship,
- 2024 AVC Central Zone Championship
- 2025 Everest Women's Volleyball League
