= Polina Neykova =

Bulgarian volleyball player

Personal information
- Nationality: Bulgaria
- Born: October 7, 1998 (age 28); Etropole, Bulgaria
- Height: 1.82 m (6 ft 0 in)
- Weight: 73 kg (161 lb)
- Spike: 287 cm (113 in)
- Block: 280 cm (110 in)

Volleyball information
- Position: Setter

Career
Years	Teams
2016–2020; 2020–2021; 2025	(Bulgaria) VC CSKA Sofia (Greece) Panathinaikos; Kathmandu Spikers

National team
2015-2016; 2015-2018; 2017-2018; 2017-	Bulgaria U18; Bulgaria U20; Bulgaria U23; Bulgaria
- Last updated: 20 June 2021

Polina Neykova (born October 7, 1998 in Etropole, Bulgaria) is a volleyball player from Bulgaria. She has been a member of the country's U18, U20, U23 and senior national teams.

She competed at the 2021 Women's European Volleyball League, winning a gold medal.

At club level, she played as a setter for VC CSKA Sofia from 2016 to 2020. and for Panathinaikos during the 2020-21 season.
