= Chitwan Shakti =

Defunct Nepalese volleyball team

- Founded: 2024; 2 years ago
- Dissolved: 2024
- Owner: Nimbus Holdings
- Manager: Arjun Ghimire
- Captain: Aruna Shahi
- League: Everest Women's Volleyball League

Uniforms
Home	Away

Chitwan Shakti was a women's volleyball team from Chitwan, Bagmati, Nepal. The team competed in the inaugural season of the Everest Women's Volleyball League (EWVL) in 2024 and did not continue participation in the 2025 edition of the league.

== History ==
The franchise was established in 2024 for participation in the first edition of the Everest Women's Volleyball League. In the 2025 season, the league featured a revised franchise lineup and Chitwan Shakti was no longer among the participating teams.

== Team ==
Chitwan Shakti
No.	Name	Height	Position
5	(Nepal) Aruna Shahi (C)	5' 8"	Setter
15	(Nepal) Salina Budha Magar		Spiker
3	(Nepal) Jenisha Biswokarma		Spiker
11	(Nepal) Anjila Pradhan		Libero
9	(Nepal) Sunita Khadka		Blocker
1	(Nepal) Bhawana Dangi		Spiker
14	(Nepal) Balmika Acharya		Blocker
7	(Nepal) Saraswoti Kattel		Setter
6	(India) Soorya S		M. Blocker
13	(India) KP Anushree	5' 83"	Outside Hitter
12	(Azerbaijan) Kseniya Pavlenko	6' 03"	Outside Hitter
2	(Nepal) Niteesha Mahato (Talent Hunt)		

== Administration and support staff ==
Position	Name
Owner	Nimbus Holdings
Head coach	(Nepal) Arjun Ghimire
Operational Manager	Dipendra Chaudhary
