= Pragati Nath =

Nepalese volleyball player

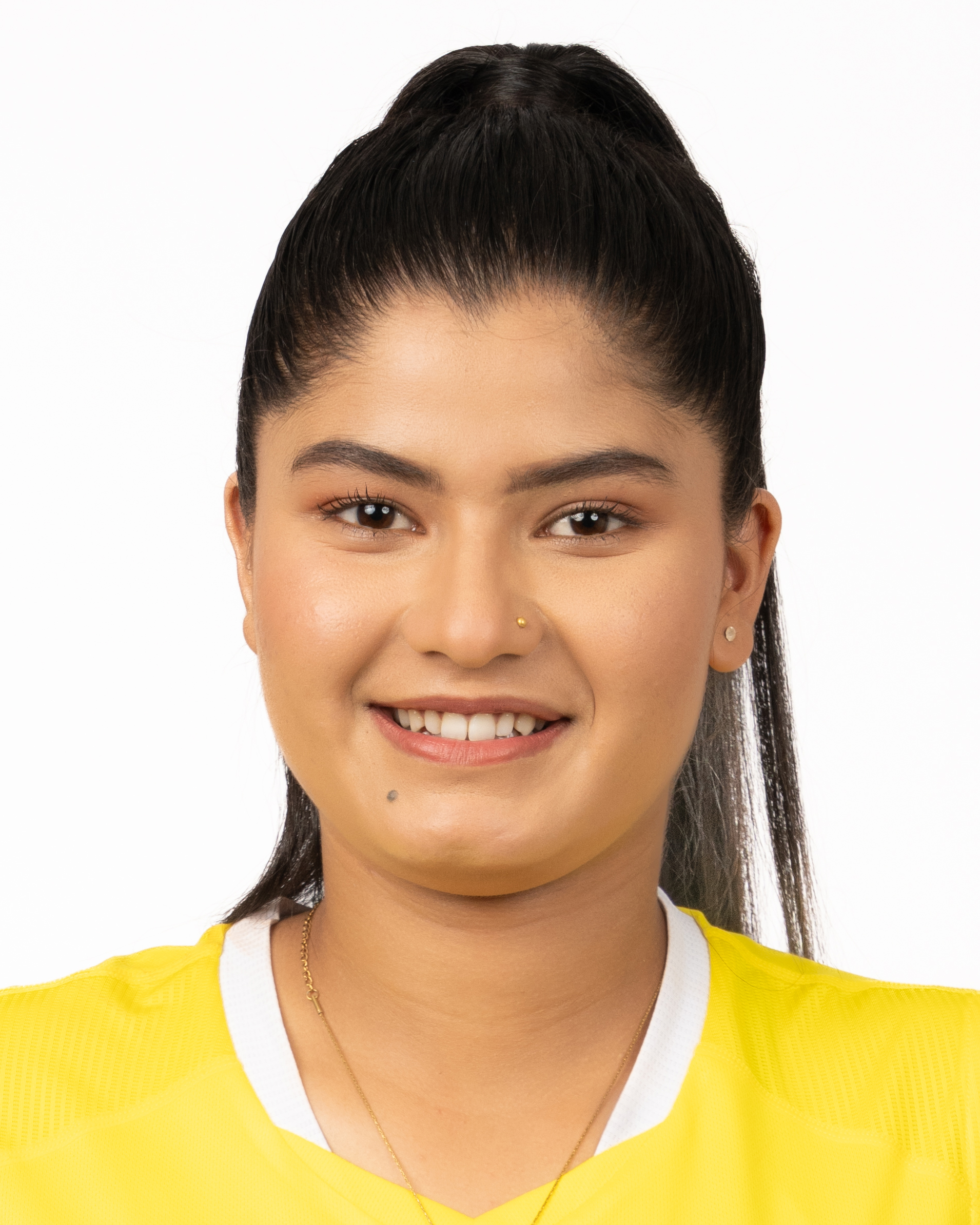

Personal information
- Born: 30 August 2005 (age 21); Rukum West, Nepal
- Hometown: , Nepal
- Height: 5 ft 7 in (170 cm)

Volleyball information
- Position: Setter
- Current club: New Diamond Youth Sports Club
- Number: 1

Career
Years	Teams
2020 - Present	New Diamond Youth Sports Club
2024	Gandaki Thunders
2024	Pokhara Ninjas

National team
2023–present	Nepal
International Medal Record
Women's volleyball
Representing Nepal
CAVA Women's Volleyball Challenge Cup
Bronze medal – third place	2023 Kathmandu	Team
CAVA Women's Volleyball Nations League
Silver medal – second place	2024 Kathmandu	Team

Pragati Nath (Nepali: प्रगति नाथ; born 30 August 2005) is a Nepali professional volleyball player who plays as a setter for New Diamond Youth Sports Club and the Nepal National Women's Volleyball Team.

She made her debut for the Nepal women's national volleyball team on May 23, 2023 during the CAVA Women's Volleyball Challenge Cup held in Dasharath Rangasala, Kathmandu, Nepal.

== Club career ==
=== New Diamond Youth Sports Club ===
Pragati began her playing career at New Diamond Youth Sports Club. In 2019, volleyball coach Kumar Rai visited Rukum to conduct a training program, where he identified Pragati Nath as a promising talent. Since then, she has been a regular member of the club and has captained the team on several occasions.

=== From Spiker to Setter ===
Following the departure of national team captain Aruna Shahi, New Diamond Youth Sports Club faced a shortage of a quality setter. Head coach Kumar Rai then made a bold decision to switch Pragati’s position from spiker to setter. This move proved to be a major milestone in her budding career.

At just 16 years of age, Pragati excelled in national-level competitions within two months of beginning her training as a setter, quickly adapting to the role and delivering consistent performances.

In 2021, New Diamond went on to win the Damak Cup in Jhapa and the Karpakeli Pun National Women's Volleyball title in Chitwan.

=== Pokhara Ninjas ===
Pragati is a Marquee Player of Pokhara Ninjas in the Everest Women's Volleyball League 2025.

== Early life ==
Pragati was born on 30 August 2005 in Rukum West to her father, Birjit, and mother, Khimkumari. She began playing volleyball at the age of 14, initially for fun in her village.

During a visit to Rukum for official work, the head coach of New Diamond Youth Sports Club Kumar Rai noticed Pragati’s potential and brought her into the team, where she began formal training. She made her domestic volleyball debut in 2020 through the first edition of the Tiger Cup held in Pokhara.

Although her initial playing time was limited, the experience proved valuable. In the second edition of the Tiger Cup, following the departure of setter Aruna Shahi, Pragati earned regular opportunities. She capitalized on the vacancy at New Diamond with impressive performances, establishing herself as a promising setter for the team.

== Personal Achievements ==
Within a span of just 45 days (December 2025 to January 2026), New Diamond Youth Sports Club competed in three national-level tournaments. In all three competitions, Pragati was named Best Setter of the Tournament, highlighting her consistency and impact at the highest domestic level.

Her Best Setter honors came in the following tournaments:

- 9th NVA Volleyball Championship 2025
- 9th Sherbahadur Khadka Memorial Women's Volleyball Championship 2026
- 6th Tiger Cup 2026
