= Saraswoti Chaudhary =

Nepali volleyball player

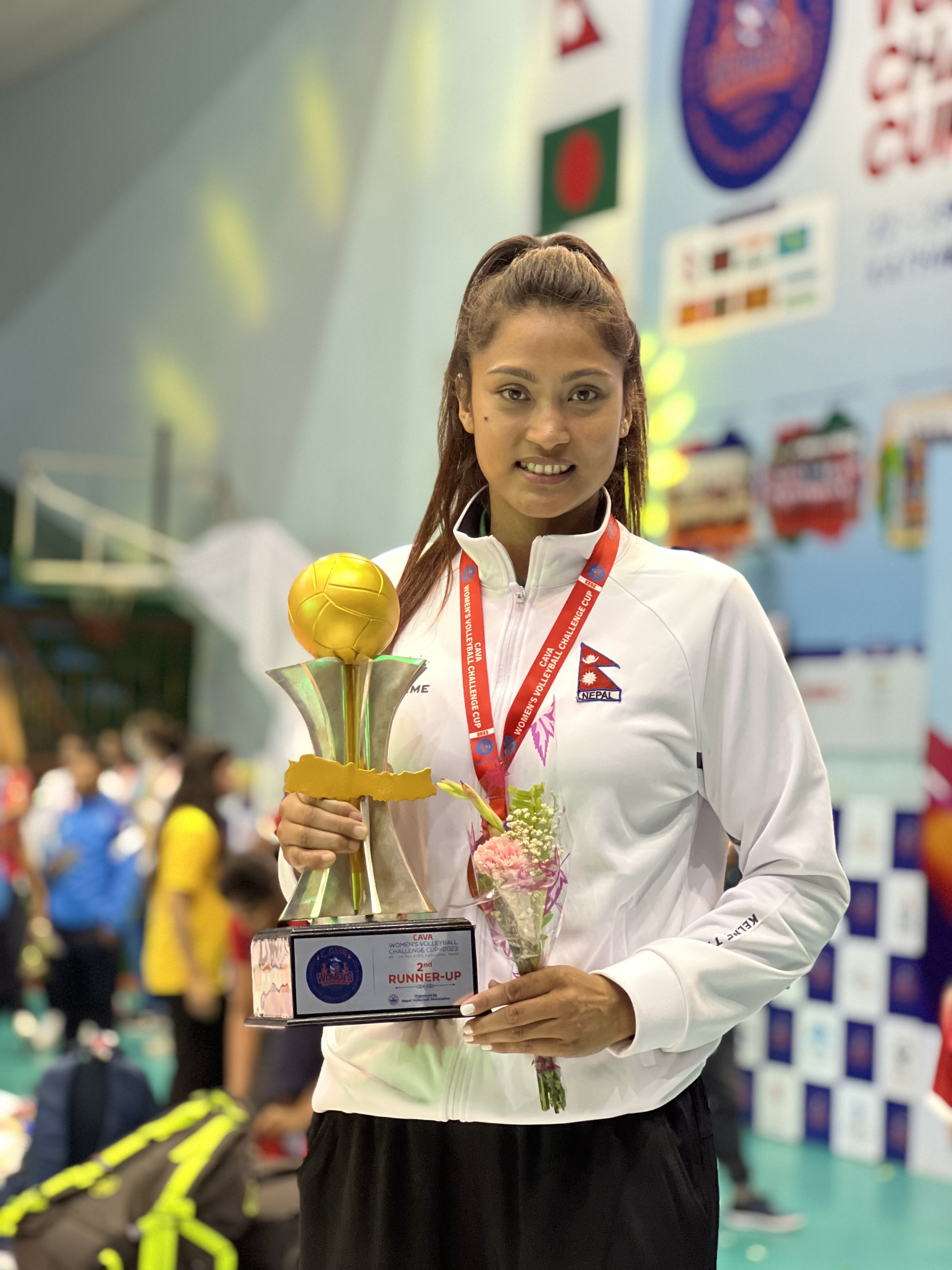

Personal information
- Nickname: Sara
- Born: October 30, 1995 (age 31)
- Height: 182 cm (6 ft 0 in)

Volleyball information
- Position: Hitter
- Current club: (Nepal) APF Club
- Number: 3

National team
2017-2025	Nepal

Saraswoti Chaudhary (born October 30, 1995) is a volleyball player from Nepal. She is a former member of the Nepal National Women's Volleyball Team who also played for the Nepal Armed Police Force (APF) Club Women.

== Accomplishments ==
- Best Player at the Prime Minister's Cup Volleyball Tournament
- Key Player in APF Club's victory at the Tiger Top Cup Volleyball Championship, where she was also named the best player
- Bronze Medal at the 12th South Asian Games
- Silver Medal at the 13th South Asian Games
- Best Female Player of the Year in the NVA National Women's and Men's Volleyball Championship.

== Gallery ==
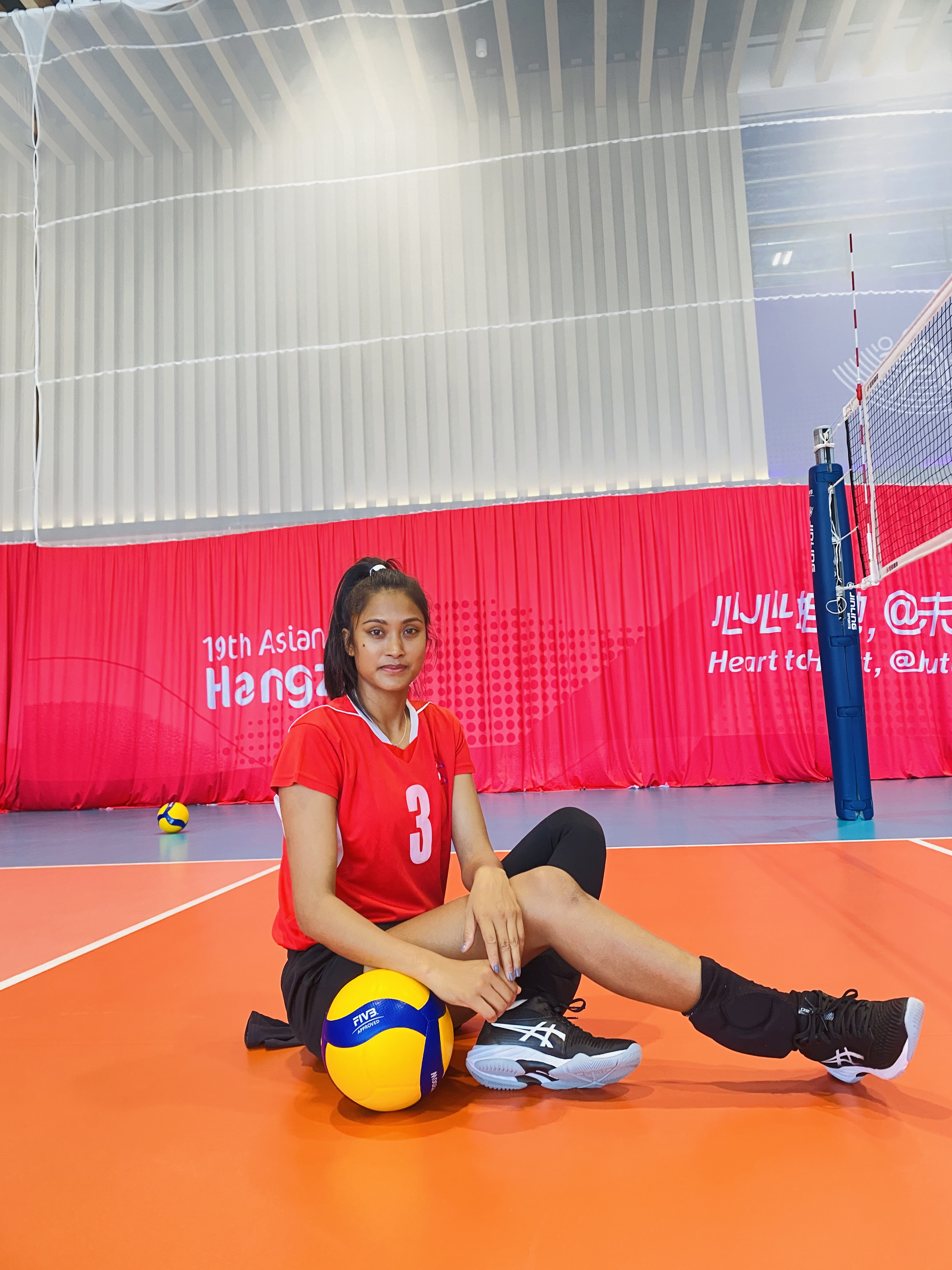

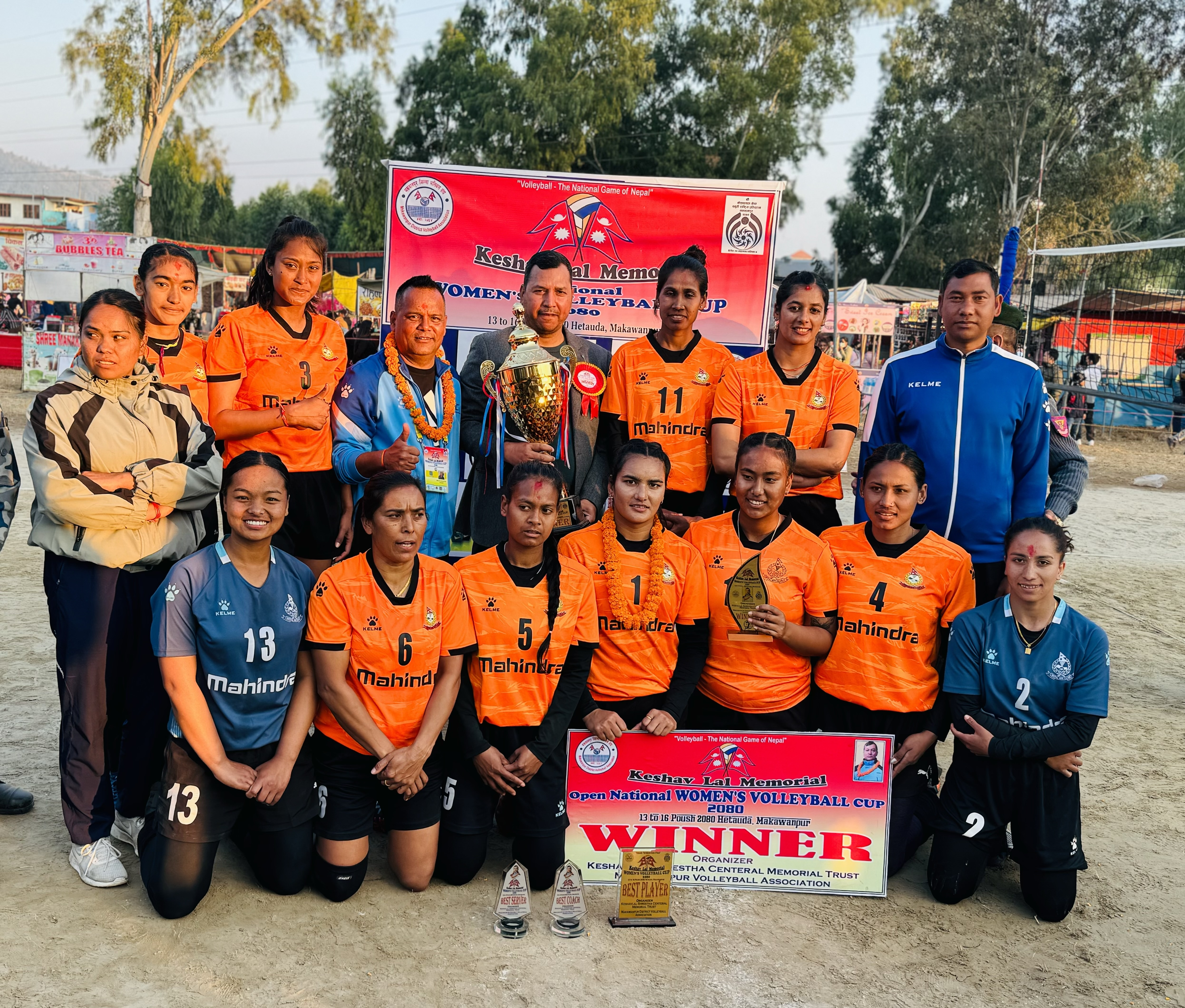

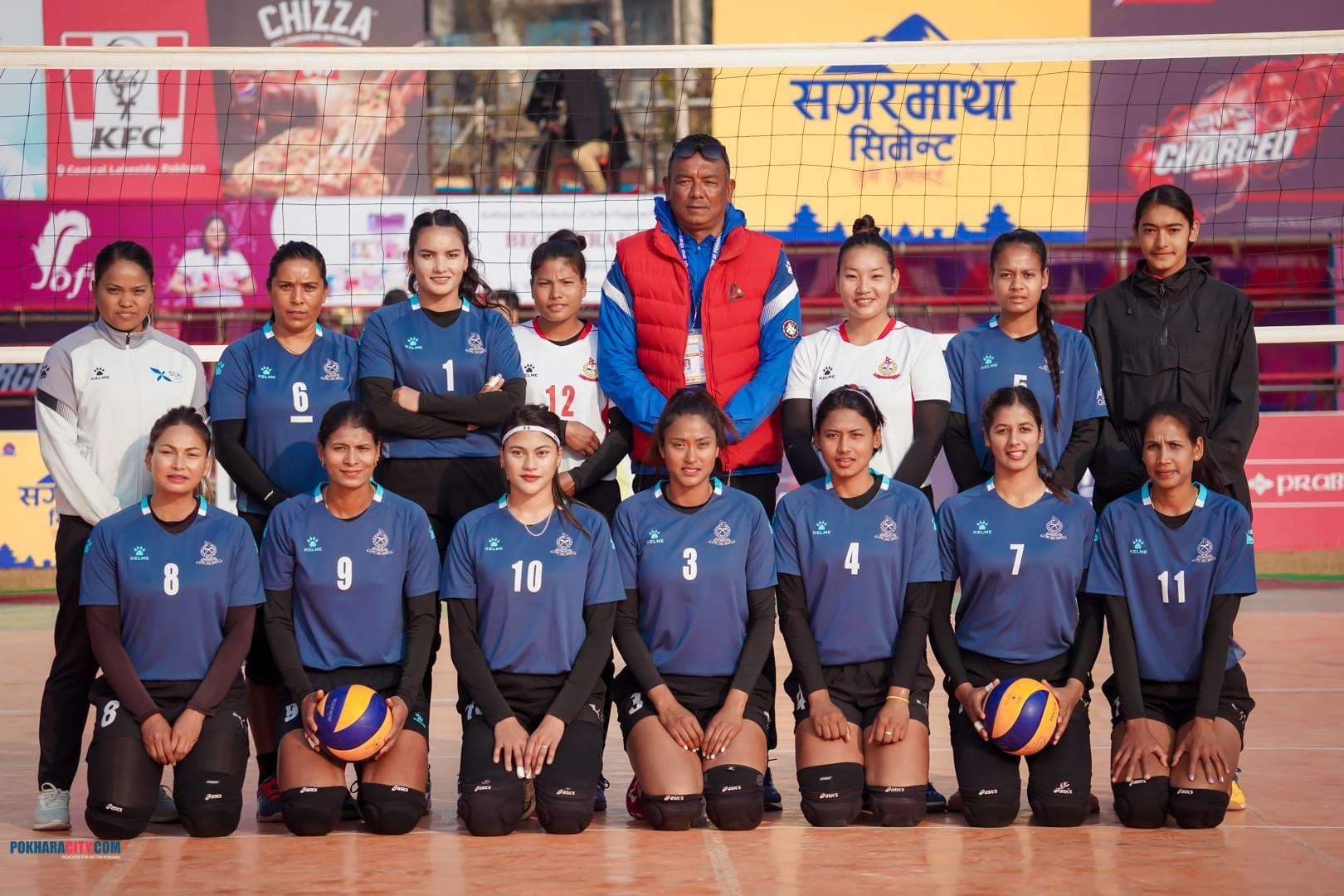

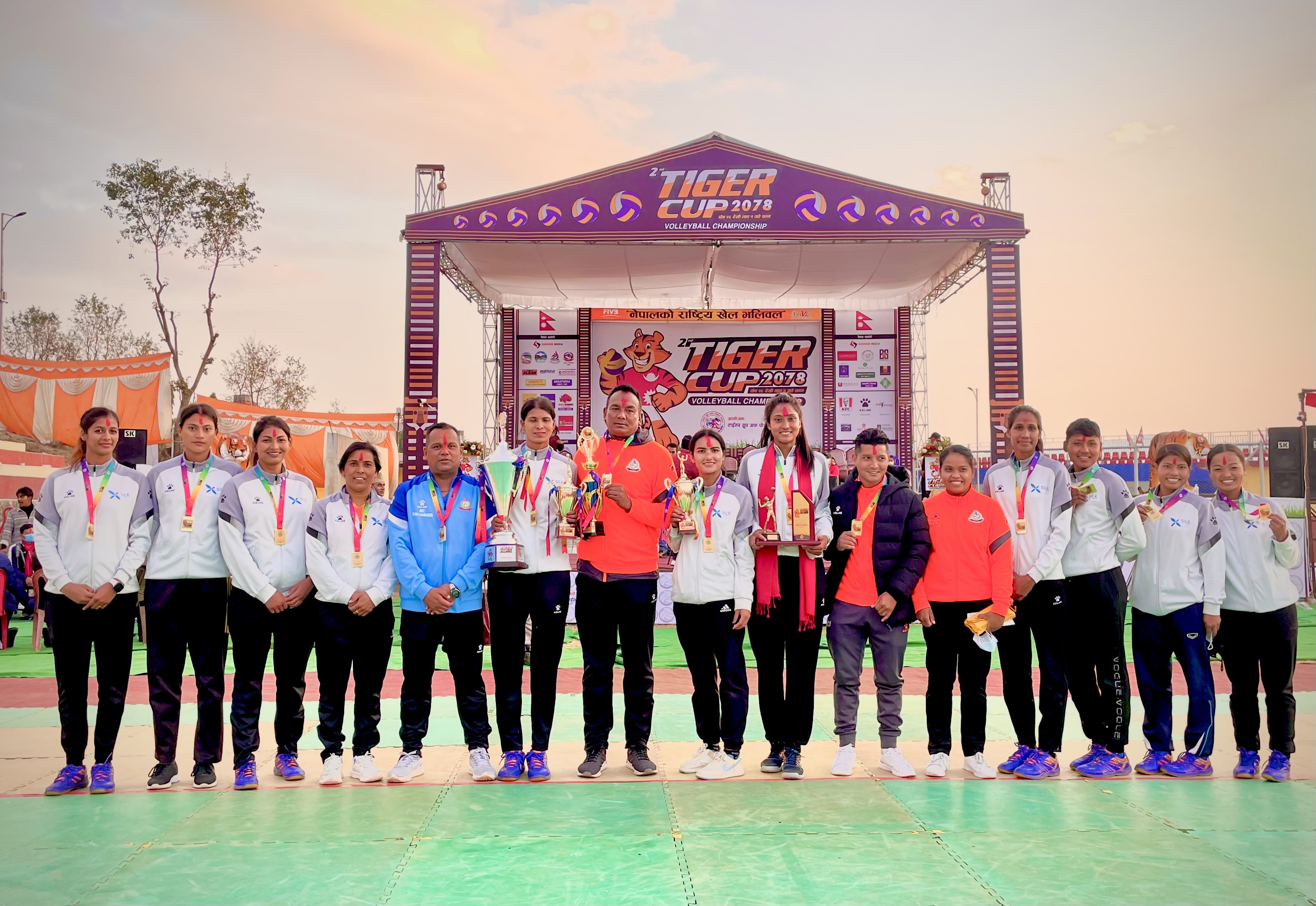

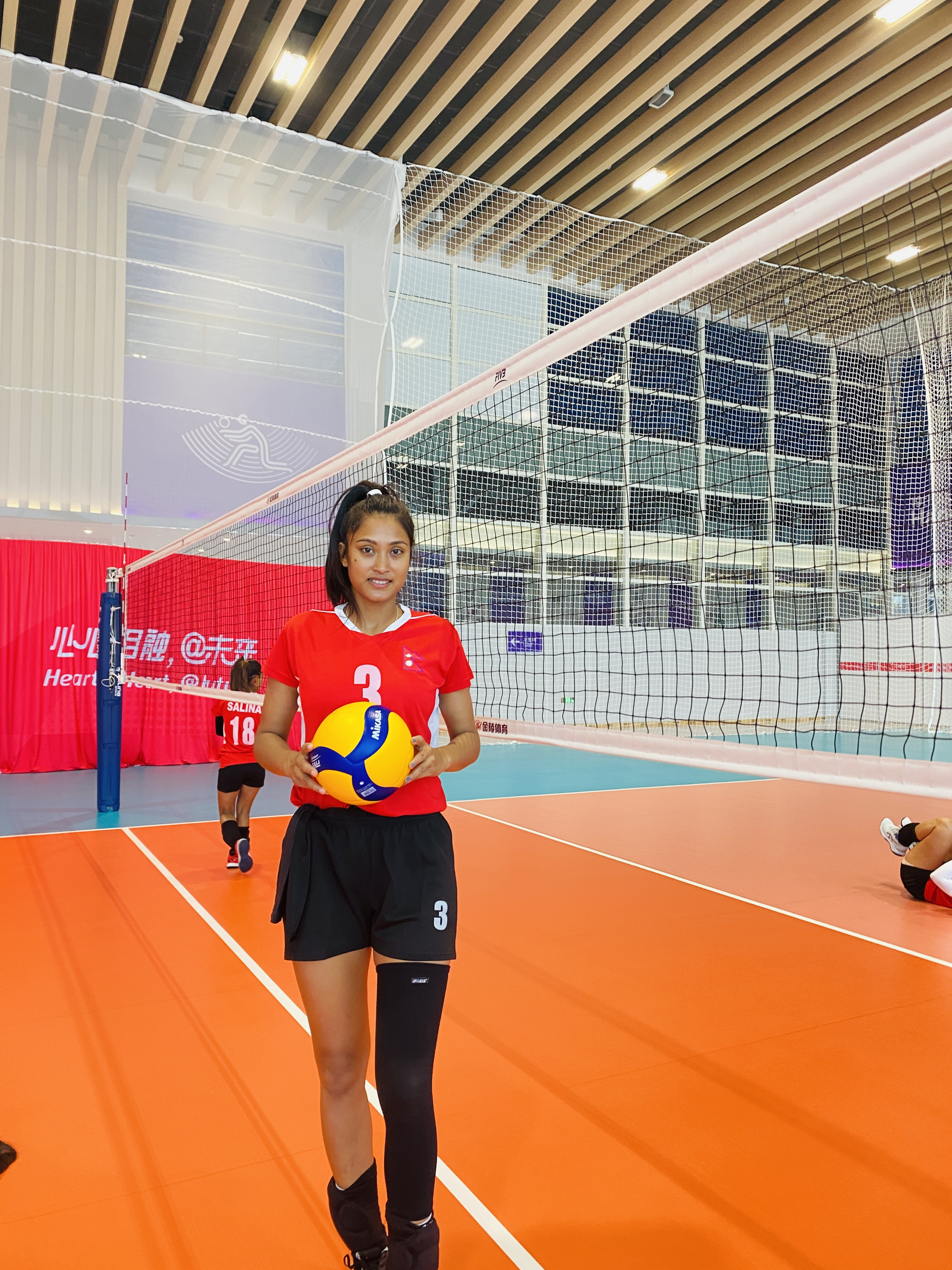

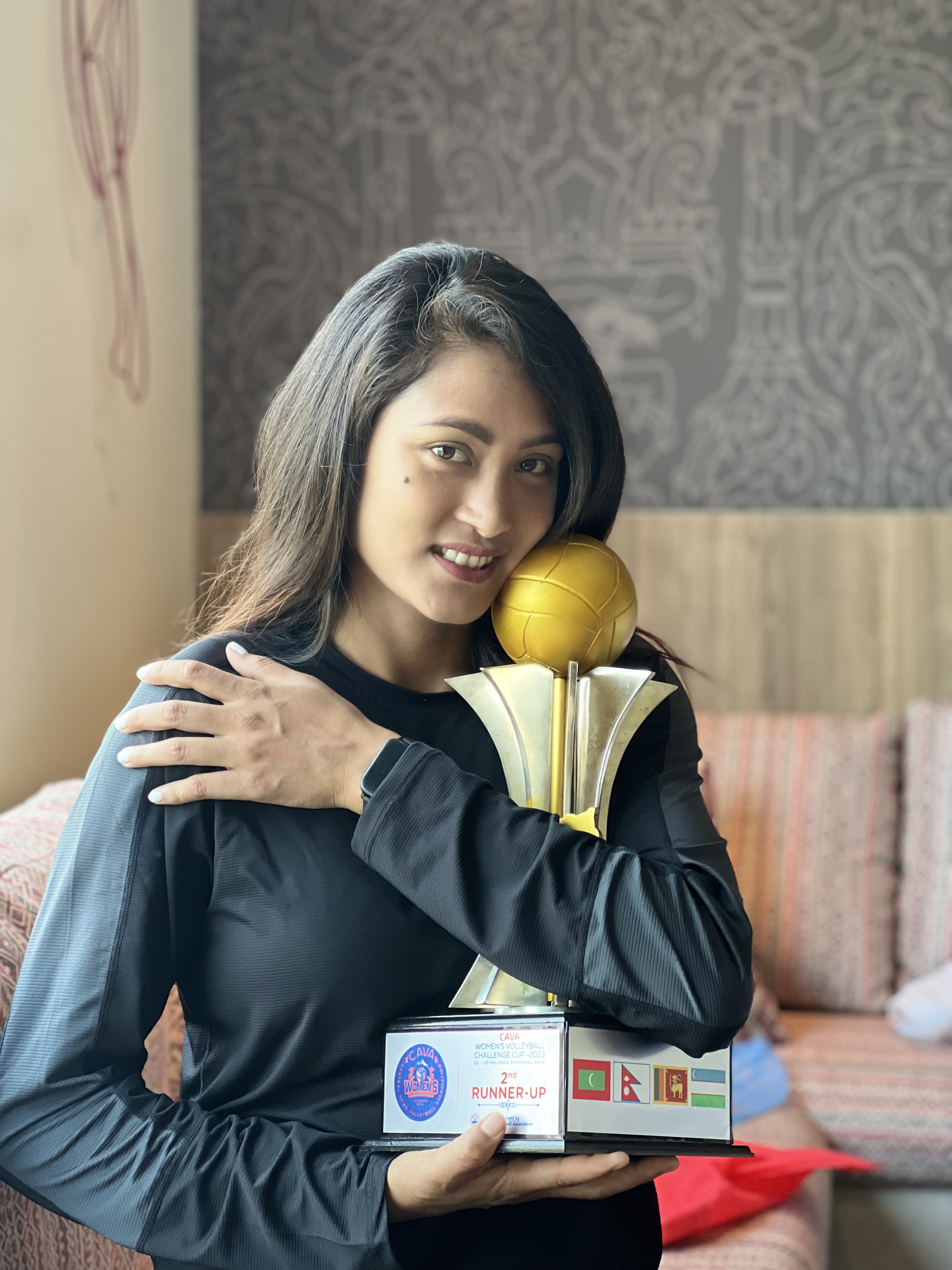
