= Salina Budha Magar =

Nepali volleyball player (born 2006)

Personal information
- Nationality: Nepali
- Born: 25 October 2006 (age 20)

Volleyball information
- Position: Outside hitter
- Current club: New Diamond Youth Sports Club
- Number: 15

Career
- Years: Team
- 2018 - Present: New Diamond Youth Sport Club
- 2025: Lalitpur Queens

National team
- Years: Team
- 2026 - Present: Nepal

Salina Budha Magar (Nepali: सलिना बुढामगर; born 25 October 2006) is a Nepali Professional Volleyball Player who plays as Outside Hitter for New Diamond Youth Sports Club, Lalitpur Queens and Nepal National Women's Volleyball Team.

Having represented Nepal at the U20 Women's National Volleyball Team level in 2024, Salina made her senior national team debut in May 2026.

== Early Life and Education ==
Budha Magar was born in Rolpa, Nepal. She later moved to Kathmandu to pursue volleyball and began training at New Diamond Youth Sports Club in 2020 under coach Kumar Rai. After moving to Kathmandu, she completed her Secondary Education Examination (SEE) from New Diamond Academy and joined Greenfield National Secondary School for higher secondary education (+2).

== Club career ==
Salina began her competitive volleyball career with New Diamond Youth Sports Club. Her early competitions included the 6th NVA National Women's Club Volleyball Championship and the RBB-NVA National Women's and Men's Club Volleyball League in 2021.

In 2022, she received the Emerging Player award at the 6th KNP Nerolac National Women's Volleyball Championship. In 2023, she was named Emerging Player and Best Server at the first Bagmati Province New Diamond U-18 Women's Volleyball Championship.

Budha Magar also represented Chitwan Shakti in the inaugural Everest Women's Volleyball League in 2024 and joined Lalitpur Queens for the 2025 season.

== International career ==
Salina Budha Magar was selected for Nepal's under-20 women's national volleyball team in 2024 to compete in the CAVA U-20 Women's Volleyball Championship in Malé, Maldives. The team was announced by the Nepal Volleyball Association in July 2024.

In 2026, she made her senior national-team debut at the CAVA Women's Volleyball Championship in Kathmandu. Nepal finished fourth in the tournament.

She was also included in Nepal's squad for the 2026 Asian Games in Japan.
