= Darin Pinsuwan =

Thai volleyball player

Personal information
- Full name: Darin Pinsuwan
- Nickname: Kat
- Nationality: Thai
- Born: Khatthalee Pinsuwan; October 30, 1994 (age 32); Khonkaen, Thailand
- Height: 1.71 m (5 ft 7 in)
- Weight: 70 kg (150 lb)

Volleyball information
- Position: Outside hitter
- Current club: Khonkaen Star
- Number: 77

National team
2014, 2022–2023	Thailand
Honours
Women's volleyball
Representing Thailand
Asian Games
Bronze medal – third place	2014 Incheon	Team

Darin Pinsuwan (Thai: ดาริน ปิ่นสุวรรณ; born October 30, 1994) is a Thai indoor volleyball player of Supreme Chonburi-E.Tech. She is a member of the Thailand women's national volleyball team.

== Clubs ==
- (Thailand) Khonkaen Star (2010–2023)
- (Vietnam) LP Bank Ninh Bình (2022–2023)
- (South Korea) GS Caltex Seoul Kixx (2023–2024)
- (Thailand) Supreme Chonburi (2023–2024)
- (Chinese Taipei) New Taipei City CMFC (2024–2025)
- (Vietnam) IMP - Bắc Ninh (2024–2025)
- (Nepal) Lalitpur Queens (2025–2026)
- (Vietnam) Hóa chất Đức Giang Lào Cai (2025–2026)
- (Vietnam) Thái Nguyên (2025–2026)
- (Thailand) Khonkaen Star (2025–2027)

== Awards ==
=== Clubs ===
- 2012–13 Thailand League - Champion, with Idea Khonkaen
- 2013 Thai–Denmark Super League - Champion, with Idea Khonkaen
- 2015 Thai–Denmark Super League - Third, with Idea Khonkaen
- 2016 Thai–Denmark Super League - Third, with Idea Khonkaen
- 2019 Thai–Denmark Super League - Third, with Khonkaen Star
- 2020 Thailand League – Runner-up, with Khonkaen Star
- 2023 Vietnam League – Champion, with LP Bank Ninh Bình
