= Karnali Yashvis =

Nepalese volleyball team

- Founded: 2024; 2 years ago
- Owner: Sushil gupta, krishna BK
- Coach: Kumar Rai
- Captain: Sumitra Regmi
- League: Everest Women's Volleyball League
- 2024: (gold) Champions

Uniforms
Home	Away

Karnali Yashvis is a women's volleyball team from Surkhet, Karnali Province, playing in the Everest Women's Volleyball League in Nepal. The team was founded in 2024 and is owned by Rajesh Bagadiya and Pratik Adhikari.

== Honors ==
=== Domestic ===
- Everest Women's Volleyball League

Winners (2): 2024, 2025

== Team (2025) ==
No.	Name	Height	Position
2	(Nepal) Sumitra Regmi (C)	6' 1"	Middle blocker
10	(Nepal) Safiya Pun		Middle blocker
18	(Nepal) Rasmita Dura		Libero
14	(Nepal) Jasna Mahato		Setter
4	(Nepal) Puja Chaudhary/Tharu	5' 6"	Spiker
	(Nepal) Nebika Chaudhary		
	(Nepal) Rebika Lama		
	(Nepal) Elisha Bhuju		
	(Brazil) Ana Flávia Galvão		Setter
	(Greece) Evangelia Chantava		Outside hitter

== Notable players ==
- (United States) Gabrielle Benda
- (Greece) Athanasia Liagki
- (Turkey) Zeynep Outran

== Tournament history ==
Key
Champions
Runners-up

=== Everest Women's Volleyball League ===
2025 Everest Women's Volleyball League
Year	Result	Position	P	W	L	Pts	SR	SPR
2024	Champions	1/6	6	6	0	13	2.25	0.893
2025	Champions	1/6	6	6	0	15	4.50	1.146
