= Kamana Bista =

Nepalelese Volleyball Player

Personal information
- Born: 1 January 2000 (age 26) Jajarkot, Nepal
- Height: 170 cm (5 ft 7 in)

Volleyball information
- Position: Spiker
- Current club: Nepal Police
- Number: 11

National team
- Years: Team
- 2021–: Nepal

Kamana Bista (born 1 January 2000) is a Nepalese professional volleyball player. She is a member of the Nepal Women's Volleybal team. She made her debut in the national team during the AVC Asian Central Zone Women's and Men's Volleyball Championship in Bangladesh. She also plays for the Nepal Police Club in domestic matches.

She played in the Maldives Volleyball Association Cup 2022, where she represented Maldives Service Club (Police). She played for Lalitpur Queens in the inaugural season of the Everest Women's Volleyball League.
