= Usha Bhandari =

Nepali volleyball player (born 2004)

Personal information
- Full name: Usha Bhandari
- Born: 15 June 2004 (age 22) Tanahun, Nepal
- Height: 170 cm (5 ft 7 in)

Volleyball information
- Position: Spiker
- Current club: Kathmandu Spikers
- Number: 6

National team
- Years: Team
- 2019–: Nepal

Usha Bhandari (born 15 June 2004) is a Nepali professional volleyball player. She has played for international clubs such as Falcon Club and the Maldives National Defence Force. She is also a member of the Nepal women's national volleyball team. In 2021, Usha was nominated for the NSJF Pulsar Sports Award and named best player at the NVA National Championship. Bhandari made her national volleyball debut at the age of 14.

== Awards ==
- Best player at NVA National Volleyball Championship
