= Aruna Shahi =

Nepal women's national volleyball team captain

Personal information
- Born: 17 November 1994 (age 31); Myagdi, Nepal
- Height: 175 cm (5 ft 9 in)

Volleyball information
- Position: Setter
- Current club: (Nepal) Lumbini Lavas
- Number: 5

National team
2019-2025	Nepal

Aruna Shahi (Nepali: अरुणा शाही, born 17 November 1994) is a former Nepali women's international volleyball player who served as the captain of the Nepal women's national volleyball team.

== Career ==
Aruna won a silver medal with Nepal in the 13th South Asian Games. Shahi was awarded National and International Players Association award on 9 July 2024.
