= Madhesh United =

Nepalese volleyball team

- Founded: 2024; 1 year ago
- Owner: Rohit Agrawal, Vishal Agrawal
- Coach: Bharat Yadav
- Captain: Niruta Thagunna
- League: Everest Women's Volleyball League

Uniforms
Home	Away

Madhesh United is a women's volleyball team from Birgunj, Madhesh, playing in the Everest Women's Volleyball League in Nepal. The team was founded in 2024 and is owned by Rohit Agrawal and Vishal Agrawal.

== Team (2025) ==
No.	Name	Height	Position
1	(Nepal) Niruta Thagunna(C)	5' 5"	Spiker
11	(Nepal) Aarati Subedi	5' 10"	Spiker
8	(Nepal) Kopila Rana		Blocker
7	(Nepal) Saraswoti Kattel		Setter
15	(Nepal) Usha Bista		Middle blocker
	(Nepal) Babita Bohara		
3	(Nepal) Basanti Saud		Blocker
6	(Nepal) Sneha Thagunna	5' 9"	Middle blocker

== Notable players ==
- (Kazakhstan) Yevgeniya Kalinova
- (Tunisia) Yosra Zeramdini
- (India) Jini Kovat Shaji
