= Kathmandu Spikers =

Nepalese volleyball team

- Founded: 2024; 2 years ago
- Owner: Sharad Kumar Tibarewala
- Coach: Lok Bahadur Budha
- Captain: Usha Bhandari
- League: Everest Women's Volleyball League

Uniforms
Home	Away

Kathmandu Spikers is a women's volleyball team from Kathmandu, Bagnati Province, playing in the Everest Women's Volleyball League in Nepal. The team was founded in 2024 and is owned by Sharad Kumar Tibarewala.

== Team (2025) ==
No.	Name	Height	Position
6	(Nepal) Usha Bhandari (C)	5' 7"	Outside spiker
7	(Nepal) Kabita Bhatta	5' 7"	Middle blocker
3	(Nepal) Manisha Chaudhary		Blocker
21	(Nepal) Yamuna Rasaili		Libero
16	(Nepal) Rima Kunwar	5' 5"	Spiker
1	(Nepal) Balmika Acharya		Blocker
10	(Nepal) Kamala Pun		Setter
7	(Nepal) Ashika Chettri		Spiker
4	(Bulgaria) Polina Neykova	5'10"	Setter
19	(Thailand) Apinya Pratibatthong	5' 11"	Spiker
79	(Thailand) Kanchana Sisaikaeo	5' 11"	Spiker
20	(Nepal) Anisha Tharu (talent hunt)		
9	(Nepal) Bhubaneswori Chand (talent hunt)		
Head coach		(Nepal) Lok Bahadur Budha	

== Technical staff ==
Position	Name
Owner	Sharad Kumar Tibarewala
COO	Sudixya Adhikari
Team manager	Kapil G. C.
Head coach	Lok Bahadur Budha

== Notable players ==
- (Bulgaria) Andrea Tsvetanova
- (Turkey) Pelin Eroktay
- (Turkey) Fulden Ural
