= Everest Women's Volleyball League =

Women's indoor volleyball league in Nepal

- Most recent season or competition: 2025 Everest Women's Volleyball League
- Sport: Volleyball
- Founded: 2024; 2 years ago
- First season: 2024
- CEO: Snevy Chapagain
- Director: Antara Siddhanta
- Organizing body: Infinity Dreams Pvt. Ltd.
- No. of teams: 6
- Country: Nepal
- Venues: Dasarath Stadium Covered Hall, Kathmandu
- Confederation: AVC
- Most recent champion: Karnali Yashvis (2025)
- Most titles: Karnali Yashvis (2nd title)

Everest Women's Volleyball League (EWVL) is a professional women's indoor volleyball franchise league in Nepal. The inaugural season took place in September 2024. EWVL is the first women's club volleyball league held in South Asia.

== Background ==
The Nepal Volleyball Association (NVA) in association with the Infinity Dreams Pvt. Ltd. launched the inaugural season of the Everest Women's Volleyball League. Infinity Dreams manage the league across the country based on the home and away principle for a duration of seven years. In August 2024, the league announced six teams for the inaugural season.

== Teams ==
Locations of the EWVL teams

Name	City	Province	Owner	Debut	Ref.
Sudurpashim Royal Warriors	Mahendranagar	Sudurpashim		2026	[1]
Karnali Yashvis	Birendranagar	Karnali	Sushil Gupta	2024	
Kathmandu Spikers	Kathmandu	Bagmati	Sharad Kumar Tibarewala	2024	
Lalitpur Queens	Lalitpur	Bagmati	Rupse Sports Management Pvt. Ltd.	2024	
Lumbini Lavas	Lumbini	Lumbini		2025	
Madhesh United	Birgunj	Madhesh	Rohit Agrawal & Vishal Agrawal	2024	
Pokhara Ninjas	Pokhara	Gandaki		2025	

=== Former teams ===
Team name	City	Province	Team owner	Debut	Ref.
Chitwan Shakti	Chitwan	Bagmati	Nimbus Holdings	2024	
Gandaki Thunders	Pokhara	Gandaki	Saurabh Kedia	2024	

== EWVL season results ==
Season	Final			Final venue	No. of teams	Ref.
Season	Winner	Score	Runner-up	Final venue	No. of teams	Ref.
2024 Details	Karnali Yashvis	3–2	Lalitpur Queens	Dasarath Stadium Covered Hall	6	
2025 Details	Karnali Yashvis	3–2	Lalitpur Queens	Dasarath Stadium Covered Hall	6	

== Titles by team ==
Team	Winners	Runners-up	Playoffs	Years won	Years runner-up	Years playoffs	Seasons played
Sudurpashim Royal Warriors							
Kathmandu Spikers							2
Gandaki Thunders							1 (Only-1)
Karnali Yashvis	2			2024 / 2025			2
Chitwan Shakti							1 (Only-1)
Lalitpur Queens		2			2024 / 2025		2
Madhesh United							2
Lumbini Lavas							1
Pokhara Ninjas							1

== See also ==
- Sports in Nepal
- Nepal Volleyball Association
