= Thailand women's national under-23 volleyball team =

Thailand Under-23
- Association: Thailand Volleyball Association
- Confederation: AVC
- Head coach: Chamnan Dokmai

Uniforms
Home	Away	Third

FIVB U23 World Championship
- Appearances: 2 (First in 2015)
- Best result: 8th (2015, 2017)

Asian U23 Championship
- Appearances: 2 (First in 2015)
- Best result: (silver) (2015, 2017)
Honours
Asian Championship
Silver medal – second place	2015 Pasig	Team
Silver medal – second place	2017 Nakhon Ratchasima	Team

The Thailand women's national under-23 volleyball team (Thai: วอลเลย์บอลหญิงทีมชาติไทยรุ่นอายุไม่เกิน 23 ปี) represents the Thailand for the under-23 and 22 level in international volleyball competitions. It is managed by the Thailand Volleyball Association.

== Competition history ==
=== U23 World Championship ===
Champions Runners-up Third place Fourth place

World Championship record
Year	Round	Position	GP	MW	ML	SW	SL	Squad
(Mexico) 2013	Did not qualify							
(Turkey) 2015	Group Round	8th Place	7	2	5	9	16	Squad
(Slovenia) 2017	Group Round	8th Place	7	2	5	12	25	Squad
Total	0 Titles	2/3	14	4	10	21	41	—

=== U23 Asian Championship ===
Champions Runners-up Third place Fourth place

Asian Championship record
Year	Round	Position	GP	MW	ML	SW	SL	Squad
(China) 2015	Final	Runners Up	7	5	2	16	11	Squad
(Thailand) 2017	Final	Runners Up	7	6	1	20	5	Squad
(Vietnam) 2019	Semifinals	4th Place	7	4	3	14	9	Squad
Total	0 Titles	3/3	21	15	6	50	25	—

== Current squad ==
The following is the Thai roster in the 2017 FIVB Women's U23 World Championship.

No.	Name	Date of birth	Height	Weight	Spike	Block	2017–18 club
1	Anisa Yotpinit	23 June 1998	1.62 m (5 ft 4 in)	58 kg (128 lb)	245 cm (96 in)	265 cm (104 in)	(Thailand) King-Bangkok
2	Chutimon Sagon	2 October 1998	1.69 m (5 ft 7 in)	53 kg (117 lb)	269 cm (106 in)	253 cm (100 in)	(Thailand) King-Bangkok
3	Wipawee Srithong	28 January 1999	1.74 m (5 ft 9 in)	65 kg (143 lb)	288 cm (113 in)	266 cm (105 in)	(Thailand) Supreme
4	Hathairat Jarat	9 February 1996	1.83 m (6 ft 0 in)	65 kg (143 lb)	286 cm (113 in)	277 cm (109 in)	(Thailand) Khonkaen Star
5	Tichakorn Boonlert	22 March 2001	1.80 m (5 ft 11 in)	78 kg (172 lb)	294 cm (116 in)	283 cm (111 in)	(Thailand) Nonthaburi
7	Patcharaporn Sittisad	20 February 1996	1.65 m (5 ft 5 in)	52 kg (115 lb)	278 cm (109 in)	263 cm (104 in)	(Thailand) Supreme
9	Usa Daowern	26 January 2000	1.80 m (5 ft 11 in)	72 kg (159 lb)	304 cm (120 in)	285 cm (112 in)	(Thailand) Thai-Denmark
10	Thanacha Sooksod	16 May 2000	1.80 m (5 ft 11 in)	70 kg (150 lb)	283 cm (111 in)	275 cm (108 in)	(Thailand) Supreme
11	Watchareeya Nuanjam	22 July 1996	1.78 m (5 ft 10 in)	64 kg (141 lb)	292 cm (115 in)	279 cm (110 in)	(Thailand) Supreme
13	Natthanicha Jaisaen	21 May 1998	1.71 m (5 ft 7 in)	55 kg (121 lb)	283 cm (111 in)	276 cm (109 in)	(Thailand) Nonthaburi
16	Parinya Pankaew	27 December 1995	1.70 m (5 ft 7 in)	59 kg (130 lb)	281 cm (111 in)	269 cm (106 in)	(Thailand) Supreme
17	Tichaya Boonlert (c)	14 February 1997	1.79 m (5 ft 10 in)	64 kg (141 lb)	293 cm (115 in)	284 cm (112 in)	(Thailand) Nonthaburi

== Statistics ==
Updated after 2017 World Championship

Competition	1st place, gold medalist(s)	2nd place, silver medalist(s)	3rd place, bronze medalist(s)	Total
Asian Championship	0	2	0	2
Total	0	2	0	2

== Record against selected opponents ==
Record against opponents in Asian Championships and World Championships (as of 17 September 2017):

- Argentina 1–0
- Brazil 0–1
- Bulgaria 0–1
- China 0–5
- Cuba 1–0
- Dominican Republic 1–1
- Egypt 0–1
- Hong Kong 1–0
- India 1–0
- Iran 1–0
- Italy 0–1
- Japan 1–2
- Kazakhstan 1–0
- South Korea 1–0
- Macau 1–0
- Malaysia 1–0
- Peru 1–0
- Slovenia 0–1
- Chinese Taipei 1–0
- Uzbekistan 1–0
- Vietnam 1–1

== See also ==
- Thailand women's national volleyball team
- Thailand men's national under-23 volleyball team
- Thailand women's national under-19 volleyball team
- Thailand women's national under-21 volleyball team
