= 2017 Asian Women's U23 Volleyball Championship squads =

This article shows the rosters of all participating teams at the 2017 Asian Women's U23 Volleyball Championship in Nakhon Ratchasima, Thailand.

== Pool A ==
=== Thailand ===
- Head coach: Nataphon Srisamutnak

The following is the Thai roster in the 2017 Asian U23 Championship.

No.	Name	Date of birth	Height	Weight	Spike	Block	2017 club
1	Anisa Yotpinit	23 June 1998	1.62 m (5 ft 4 in)	64 kg (141 lb)	245 cm (96 in)	265 cm (104 in)	(Thailand) King-Bangkok
2	Chutimon Sagorn	2 October 1998	1.69 m (5 ft 7 in)	60 kg (130 lb)	284 cm (112 in)	278 cm (109 in)	(Thailand) King-Bangkok
4	Hathairat Jarat	9 February 1996	1.84 m (6 ft 0 in)	69 kg (152 lb)	287 cm (113 in)	287 cm (113 in)	(Thailand) Thai-Denmark Nongrua
7	Patcharaporn Sittisad	16 June 1998	1.65 m (5 ft 5 in)	57 kg (126 lb)	300 cm (120 in)	281 cm (111 in)	(Thailand) Supreme Chonburi
10	Thanacha Sooksod	26 May 2000	1.80 m (5 ft 11 in)	68 kg (150 lb)	291 cm (115 in)	276 cm (109 in)	(Thailand) Supreme Chonburi
11	Watchareeya Nuanjam	22 July 1996	1.78 m (5 ft 10 in)	64 kg (141 lb)	292 cm (115 in)	279 cm (110 in)	(Thailand) Supreme Chonburi
12	Pimpichaya Kokram	16 June 1998	1.78 m (5 ft 10 in)	57 kg (126 lb)	300 cm (120 in)	281 cm (111 in)	(Thailand) 3BB Nakornnont
13	Natthanicha Jaisaen	21 May 1998	1.72 m (5 ft 8 in)	61 kg (134 lb)	273 cm (107 in)	266 cm (105 in)	(Thailand) 3BB Nakornnont
14	Chitaporn Kamlangmak	17 March 1996	1.86 m (6 ft 1 in)	73 kg (161 lb)	290 cm (110 in)	282 cm (111 in)	(Thailand) Khonkaen Star
17	Tichaya Boonlert	14 February 1997	1.78 m (5 ft 10 in)	64 kg (141 lb)	291 cm (115 in)	283 cm (111 in)	(Thailand) 3BB Nakornnont
18	Ajcharaporn Kongyot (c)	18 June 1995	1.78 m (5 ft 10 in)	66 kg (146 lb)	308 cm (121 in)	299 cm (118 in)	(Thailand) Supreme Chonburi
19	Chatchu-on Moksri	6 November 1999	1.78 m (5 ft 10 in)	63 kg (139 lb)	298 cm (117 in)	295 cm (116 in)	(Thailand) Nakhon Ratchasima

=== Macau ===
- Head coach: Cheong Ka-Chon

The following is the Thai roster in the 2017 Asian U23 Championship.

No.	Name	Date of birth	Height	Weight	Spike	Block	2017 club
1	Chan Mei-leng (L)	21 February 1996	1.62 m (5 ft 4 in)	52 kg (115 lb)	240 cm (94 in)	238 cm (94 in)	(Macau) Meng Hou
3	Choi Lai-Teng	5 October 1996	1.70 m (5 ft 7 in)	61 kg (134 lb)	245 cm (96 in)	240 cm (94 in)	(Macau) Meng Hou
4	Ho Chi-Leng	4 March 1995	1.67 m (5 ft 6 in)	54 kg (119 lb)	262 cm (103 in)	260 cm (100 in)	(Macau) Leng Fung
5	Wo Chi-Man	5 June 1999	1.67 m (5 ft 6 in)	56 kg (123 lb)	261 cm (103 in)	250 cm (98 in)	(Macau) Leng Fung
6	Law Weng-Sam	13 February 1998	1.73 m (5 ft 8 in)	55 kg (121 lb)	282 cm (111 in)	278 cm (109 in)	(Macau) Hong Nam
8	Lei L-Kei	23 December 2000	1.75 m (5 ft 9 in)	61 kg (134 lb)	275 cm (108 in)	270 cm (110 in)	(Macau) Hong Nam
9	Leong Pou-Lam	11 April 1998	1.62 m (5 ft 4 in)	53 kg (117 lb)	261 cm (103 in)	247 cm (97 in)	(Macau) Fui Cheng
11	Leong On-Leng (c)	20 April 1996	1.71 m (5 ft 7 in)	65 kg (143 lb)	268 cm (106 in)	260 cm (100 in)	(Macau) Hong Nam
12	Chao Ka-Man	3 August 1997	1.67 m (5 ft 6 in)	54 kg (119 lb)	240 cm (94 in)	235 cm (93 in)	(Macau) Leng Fung
14	Wu Teng-Chi	25 June 1998	1.82 m (6 ft 0 in)	72 kg (159 lb)	272 cm (107 in)	268 cm (106 in)	(Macau) Meng Hou
17	Leong Ho-L	7 December 1996	1.63 m (5 ft 4 in)	56 kg (123 lb)	242 cm (95 in)	240 cm (94 in)	(Macau) Pui Cheng
18	Lu Yi-Chi	6 March 1995	1.82 m (6 ft 0 in)	65 kg (143 lb)	280 cm (110 in)	278 cm (109 in)	(Macau) Macao University

=== Hong Kong ===
- Head coach: Cheung King-Fai

The following is the Thai roster in the 2017 Asian U23 Championship.

No.	Name	Date of birth	Height	Weight	Spike	Block	2017 club
1	Law Ho Fung Thyllis	5 October 1995	1.70 m (5 ft 7 in)	69 kg (152 lb)	265 cm (104 in)	255 cm (100 in)	
2	Li Chui Man Mandy (L)	30 September 1996	1.60 m (5 ft 3 in)	54 kg (119 lb)	240 cm (94 in)	230 cm (91 in)	
4	Yau Ching	18 January 1996	1.74 m (5 ft 9 in)	77 kg (170 lb)	275 cm (108 in)	260 cm (100 in)	
5	Ho Kin Yiu	4 March 1996	1.83 m (6 ft 0 in)	66 kg (146 lb)	285 cm (112 in)	275 cm (108 in)	
6	Law Weng-Sam	13 February 1998	1.73 m (5 ft 8 in)	55 kg (121 lb)	282 cm (111 in)	278 cm (109 in)	
7	Sze Ka Yi	26 May 1999	1.77 m (5 ft 10 in)	65 kg (143 lb)	285 cm (112 in)	275 cm (108 in)	
8	Chim Wing Lam	11 August 1997	1.73 m (5 ft 8 in)	62 kg (137 lb)	280 cm (110 in)	265 cm (104 in)	
10	Lou Ka Wai	24 September 1995	1.63 m (5 ft 4 in)	52 kg (115 lb)	260 cm (100 in)	245 cm (96 in)	
12	Pang Wing Lam	11 February 1997	1.74 m (5 ft 9 in)	70 kg (150 lb)	275 cm (108 in)	265 cm (104 in)	
13	Ng Hei Yu	28 November 1995	1.62 m (5 ft 4 in)	67 kg (148 lb)	258 cm (102 in)	245 cm (96 in)	
16	Cheung Nok Ln	5 May 1996	1.57 m (5 ft 2 in)	55 kg (121 lb)	255 cm (100 in)	245 cm (96 in)	
17	Ngai Kwai Ting	23 May 1995	1.75 m (5 ft 9 in)	73 kg (161 lb)	280 cm (110 in)	270 cm (110 in)	
18	Koo Yung Yung (c)	22 August 1995	1.78 m (5 ft 10 in)	65 kg (143 lb)	280 cm (110 in)	270 cm (110 in)	

== Pool B ==
=== Japan ===
- Head coach: Kiyoshi Abo

The following is the Japan roster in the 2017 Asian U23 Championship.

No.	Name	Date of birth	Height	Weight	Spike	Block	2017 club
1	Misaki Yamauchi (c)	10 March 1995	1.72 m (5 ft 8 in)	69 kg (152 lb)	306 cm (120 in)	295 cm (116 in)	(Japan) NEC Red rockets
2	Nozomi Itoh	16 February 1995	1.78 m (5 ft 10 in)	70 kg (150 lb)	306 cm (120 in)	295 cm (116 in)	(Japan) Toray Arrow
4	Ayaka Sugi	12 April 1996	1.77 m (5 ft 10 in)	72 kg (159 lb)	293 cm (115 in)	282 cm (111 in)	(Japan) Tokyo Women's College
5	Haruka Kanamori	9 April 1996	1.76 m (5 ft 9 in)	66 kg (146 lb)	297 cm (117 in)	285 cm (112 in)	(Japan) Hisamitsu Springs
6	Misaki Shirai	30 July 1996	1.75 m (5 ft 9 in)	71 kg (157 lb)	293 cm (115 in)	280 cm (110 in)	(Japan) Toray Arrow
7	Nanaka Sakamoto	6 September 1996	1.76 m (5 ft 9 in)	65 kg (143 lb)	304 cm (120 in)	294 cm (116 in)	(Japan) Denso Airybees
8	Miki Sakurai	1 May 1996	1.69 m (5 ft 7 in)	62 kg (137 lb)	275 cm (108 in)	265 cm (104 in)	(Japan) Nippon Sport Science University
10	Kaori Mabashi	18 November 1996	1.73 m (5 ft 8 in)	63 kg (139 lb)	295 cm (116 in)	285 cm (112 in)	(Japan) Hitachi
12	Moeri Hanai (L)	17 April 1997	1.66 m (5 ft 5 in)	60 kg (130 lb)	275 cm (108 in)	270 cm (110 in)	(Japan) Nippon Sport Science University
13	Mivako Osanai	19 July 1997	1.74 m (5 ft 9 in)	66 kg (146 lb)	293 cm (115 in)	270 cm (110 in)	(Japan) Hitachi
16	Rei Kudo	5 December 1997	1.75 m (5 ft 9 in)	65 kg (143 lb)	300 cm (120 in)	295 cm (116 in)	(Japan) Denso Airybees
17	Hikari Kato	26 August 1997	1.79 m (5 ft 10 in)	74 kg (163 lb)	297 cm (117 in)	287 cm (113 in)	(Japan) Hisamitsu Springs

=== Uzbekistan ===
- Head coach: Olga Isaenok

The following is the Thai roster in the 2017 Asian U23 Championship.

No.	Name	Date of birth	Height	Weight	Spike	Block	2017 club
1	Zulfiyakhon Abdulkhaeva	28 April 1996	1.72 m (5 ft 8 in)	65 kg (143 lb)	290 cm (110 in)	280 cm (110 in)	
2	Nazokat Toshpulatova	15 April 1996	1.75 m (5 ft 9 in)	62 kg (137 lb)	300 cm (120 in)	290 cm (110 in)	
3	Khojikhon Mirabdullaeva	5 August 1999	1.82 m (6 ft 0 in)	59 kg (130 lb)	300 cm (120 in)	290 cm (110 in)	
5	Barhayohon Umarova	7 January 1995	1.75 m (5 ft 9 in)	65 kg (143 lb)	290 cm (110 in)	280 cm (110 in)	
6	Feruzahon Odilova	19 June 1995	1.72 m (5 ft 8 in)	60 kg (130 lb)	290 cm (110 in)	280 cm (110 in)	
7	Saida Ailamova (c)	25 August 1995	1.77 m (5 ft 10 in)	65 kg (143 lb)	300 cm (120 in)	290 cm (110 in)	
9	Darya Chernova	13 June 2001	1.82 m (6 ft 0 in)	68 kg (150 lb)	280 cm (110 in)	270 cm (110 in)	
11	Anastasiya Kolotova	8 July 1999	1.82 m (6 ft 0 in)	70 kg (150 lb)	300 cm (120 in)	290 cm (110 in)	
12	Oyatkhon Yokubova	4 January 1999	1.77 m (5 ft 10 in)	65 kg (143 lb)	290 cm (110 in)	280 cm (110 in)	
14	Nozima Ergasheva	22 November 1995	1.82 m (6 ft 0 in)	72 kg (159 lb)	300 cm (120 in)	290 cm (110 in)	
15	Nodira Sultanboeva (L)	16 November 1997	1.70 m (5 ft 7 in)	60 kg (130 lb)	290 cm (110 in)	280 cm (110 in)	

=== Vietnam ===
- Head coach: Irisawa Hidehiro

The following is the Vietnam roster in the 2017 Asian U23 Championship.

No.	Name	Date of birth	Height	Weight	Spike	Block	2017 club
1	Dương Thị Hên	15 August 1998	1.74 m (5 ft 9 in)	56 kg (123 lb)	290 cm (110 in)	282 cm (111 in)	(Vietnam) VTV Bình Điền Long An
2	Đặng Thị Kim Thanh	28 March 1999	1.77 m (5 ft 10 in)	62 kg (137 lb)	283 cm (111 in)	279 cm (110 in)	(Vietnam) VTV Bình Điền Long An
3	Trần Thị Thanh Thúy (c)	12 November 1997	1.87 m (6 ft 2 in)	63 kg (139 lb)	298 cm (117 in)	290 cm (110 in)	(Vietnam) VTV Bình Điền Long An
7	Phạm Thị Nguyệt Anh	13 December 1998	1.74 m (5 ft 9 in)	60 kg (130 lb)	285 cm (112 in)	280 cm (110 in)	(Vietnam) Thông tin Liên Việt Post Bank
8	Trần Việt Hương	13 October 1998	1.74 m (5 ft 9 in)	66 kg (146 lb)	285 cm (112 in)	280 cm (110 in)	(Vietnam) Thông tin Liên Việt Post Bank
9	Bùi Thị Nga	22 January 1995	1.77 m (5 ft 10 in)	63 kg (139 lb)	288 cm (113 in)	280 cm (110 in)	(Vietnam) Tien Nong Thanh Hoa
10	Lưu Thị Ly Ly (L)	20 October 1998	1.68 m (5 ft 6 in)	64 kg (141 lb)	281 cm (111 in)	275 cm (108 in)	(Vietnam) Thông tin Liên Việt Post Bank
11	Trịnh Thị Huyền	20 July 1995	1.82 m (6 ft 0 in)	54 kg (119 lb)	308 cm (121 in)	298 cm (117 in)	(Vietnam) Hoa Chat Duc Giang Ha Noi
12	Lê Thị Hồng	20 December 1996	1.75 m (5 ft 9 in)	62 kg (137 lb)	287 cm (113 in)	280 cm (110 in)	(Vietnam) Hai Duong
15	Nguyễn Thị Trinh	9 May 1997	1.78 m (5 ft 10 in)	61 kg (134 lb)	298 cm (117 in)	290 cm (110 in)	(Vietnam) VTV Bình Điền Long An
19	Đoàn Thị Lâm Oanh	6 July 1998	1.71 m (5 ft 7 in)	67 kg (148 lb)	285 cm (112 in)	278 cm (109 in)	(Vietnam) Thông tin Liên Việt Post Bank
20	Nguyễn Thu Hoài	16 September 1998	1.73 m (5 ft 8 in)	58 kg (128 lb)	285 cm (112 in)	282 cm (111 in)	(Vietnam) VietinBank

== Pool C ==
=== Australia ===
- Head coach: Shannon Winzer

The following is the Thai roster in the 2017 Asian U23 Championship.

No.	Name	Date of birth	Height	Weight	Spike	Block	2017 club
1	Jennifer Taia	4 January 1995	1.93 m (6 ft 4 in)	80 kg (180 lb)	306 cm (120 in)	291 cm (115 in)	(Malaysia) Centre of Excellence
2	Kylee White	2 April 1998	1.80 m (5 ft 11 in)	71 kg (157 lb)	291 cm (115 in)	284 cm (112 in)	(Australia) Queensland Pirates
3	Georgia Clayden	1 June 1995	1.65 m (5 ft 5 in)	63 kg (139 lb)	278 cm (109 in)	265 cm (104 in)	(Australia) Canberra Heat
4	Barbour Tessa	6 July 1995	1.82 m (6 ft 0 in)	75 kg (165 lb)	290 cm (110 in)	278 cm (109 in)	(Australia) Canberra Heat
5	Durston Courtney	27 August 1998	1.82 m (6 ft 0 in)	66 kg (146 lb)	289 cm (114 in)	281 cm (111 in)	(Malaysia) Centre of Excellence
6	Fernando Buddhima (L)	2 October 1995	1.56 m (5 ft 1 in)	63 kg (139 lb)	261 cm (103 in)	249 cm (98 in)	(Australia) UTSSU
7	Freckleton Brooke	7 February 1999	1.87 m (6 ft 2 in)	73 kg (161 lb)	294 cm (116 in)	287 cm (113 in)	(Australia) Barry University Miami
8	Burton Emma	15 September 1997	1.80 m (5 ft 11 in)	69 kg (152 lb)	293 cm (115 in)	284 cm (112 in)	(Australia) Queensland Pirates
10	Reeva Rachel	26 July 1997	1.79 m (5 ft 10 in)	71 kg (157 lb)	283 cm (111 in)	275 cm (108 in)	(United States) Tyler Junior College
15	Borgeaud Danusia Sipa	1 March 1997	1.74 m (5 ft 9 in)	75 kg (165 lb)	275 cm (108 in)	265 cm (104 in)	(United States) Blinn College
16	Kudzielz Agnieszka (c)	26 March 1996	1.88 m (6 ft 2 in)	80 kg (180 lb)	292 cm (115 in)	286 cm (113 in)	(Malaysia) Centre of Excellence
18	Janssen Katrina	12 May 1995	1.85 m (6 ft 1 in)	86 kg (190 lb)	304 cm (120 in)	295 cm (116 in)	(United States) Caldwell University

=== Kazakhstan ===
- Head coach: Dzianis Matsveyeu

The following is the Thai roster in the 2017 Asian U23 Championship.

No.	Name	Date of birth	Height	Weight	Spike	Block	2017 club
1	Madina Beket (L)	6 November 1999	1.59 m (5 ft 3 in)	51 kg (112 lb)	160 cm (63 in)	255 cm (100 in)	(Kazakhstan) Altay VC
3	Saltanat Sapargaliyeva	9 May 1997	1.80 m (5 ft 11 in)	57 kg (126 lb)	290 cm (110 in)	280 cm (110 in)	(Kazakhstan) Altay VC
5	Yeketerina Sakharova (c)	1 December 1995	1.75 m (5 ft 9 in)	65 kg (143 lb)	296 cm (117 in)	275 cm (108 in)	(Kazakhstan) Altay VC
6	Dinara Syzdykova	13 December 1999	1.82 m (6 ft 0 in)	68 kg (150 lb)	285 cm (112 in)	275 cm (108 in)	(Kazakhstan) Altay VC
7	Botagoz Sarsenbayeva	16 May 1997	1.75 m (5 ft 9 in)	60 kg (130 lb)	270 cm (110 in)	260 cm (100 in)	(Kazakhstan) Altay VC
8	Polina Kostiva	13 November 1995	1.86 m (6 ft 1 in)	65 kg (143 lb)	290 cm (110 in)	280 cm (110 in)	(Kazakhstan) Altay VC
10	Zhamilya Barlybay	20 July 1998	1.70 m (5 ft 7 in)	58 kg (128 lb)	270 cm (110 in)	255 cm (100 in)	(Kazakhstan) Altay VC
11	Gulnaz Altayeva	24 March 1998	1.80 m (5 ft 11 in)	69 kg (152 lb)	284 cm (112 in)	270 cm (110 in)	(Kazakhstan) Altay VC
13	Kristina belova	29 November 1998	1.81 m (5 ft 11 in)	68 kg (150 lb)	285 cm (112 in)	272 cm (107 in)	(Kazakhstan) Altay VC
16	Yelizaveta Meister	1 November 1997	1.71 m (5 ft 7 in)	65 kg (143 lb)	279 cm (110 in)	274 cm (108 in)	(Kazakhstan) Altay VC
17	Aidana Oryntayena	30 June 1999	1.86 m (6 ft 1 in)	60 kg (130 lb)	288 cm (113 in)	274 cm (108 in)	(Kazakhstan) Altay VC
19	Diana Bortnikova	9 May 1995	1.83 m (6 ft 0 in)	62 kg (137 lb)	287 cm (113 in)	280 cm (110 in)	(Kazakhstan) Altay VC

=== Sri Lanka ===
- Head coach: Wannithila H.M.A.D.K

The following is the Thai roster in the 2017 Asian U23 Championship.

No.	Name	Date of birth	Height	Weight	Spike	Block	2017 club
2	Madurachi Thakshil Senewirathna	4 October 1996	1.66 m (5 ft 5 in)	50 kg (110 lb)	296 cm (117 in)	282 cm (111 in)	
3	M.S.Apsara Senewirathna	20 October 1995	1.72 m (5 ft 8 in)	59 kg (130 lb)	296 cm (117 in)	288 cm (113 in)	
4	Kanahalage Thilini Perera (c)	18 October 1995	1.70 m (5 ft 7 in)	50 kg (110 lb)	304 cm (120 in)	294 cm (116 in)	
6	A.L.A.Anuthithara Sandamali	6 October 1996	1.75 m (5 ft 9 in)	53 kg (117 lb)	294 cm (116 in)	286 cm (113 in)	
7	K.K.D.Sachini Charuka	17 February 1995	1.62 m (5 ft 4 in)	57 kg (126 lb)	292 cm (115 in)	284 cm (112 in)	
8	Divalapa Hewage Kaushalya	26 November 1996	1.70 m (5 ft 7 in)	57 kg (126 lb)	301 cm (119 in)	289 cm (114 in)	
9	Harambage Ridmi Fenando	13 May 1996	1.67 m (5 ft 6 in)	50 kg (110 lb)	298 cm (117 in)	288 cm (113 in)	
10	Ranasingha Aracha Chathuni	9 September 1996	1.74 m (5 ft 9 in)	72 kg (159 lb)	301 cm (119 in)	286 cm (113 in)	
11	Godellawathth Amani Kaushalya	28 September 1996	1.68 m (5 ft 6 in)	48 kg (106 lb)	300 cm (120 in)	293 cm (115 in)	
12	Eewaduge Sanduni Ranathunga (L)	26 September 1996	1.54 m (5 ft 1 in)	48 kg (106 lb)	274 cm (108 in)	260 cm (100 in)	
14	Kavisha Lakshan Perera	25 February 1997	1.76 m (5 ft 9 in)	69 kg (152 lb)	311 cm (122 in)	296 cm (117 in)	
17	Madudurage Chamali Karunaratha	28 April 1999	1.68 m (5 ft 6 in)	50 kg (110 lb)	296 cm (117 in)	281 cm (111 in)	

== Pool D ==
=== Iran ===
- Head coach:

The following is the Iranian roster in the 2017 Asian U23 Championship

=== Malaysia ===
- Head coach:

The following is the Malaysian roster in the 2017 Asian U23 Championship

=== New Zealand ===
- Head coach:

The following is the New Zealand roster in the 2017 Asian U23 Championship
