= Japan women's national under-23 volleyball team =

Japanese national volleyball team

Japan
- Association: Japan Volleyball Association
- Confederation: AVC

Uniforms
Home	Away	Third

FIVB U23 World Championship
- Appearances: 3 (First in 2013)
- Best result: (bronze) Bronze : (2013)

Asian U23 Championship
- Appearances: 2 (First in 2015)
- Best result: (gold) Gold : (2017).

The Japan women's national under-23 volleyball team represents Japan in women's under-23 volleyball events, it is controlled and managed by the Japanese Volleyball Association that is a member of Asian volleyball body Asian Volleyball Confederation (AVC) and the international volleyball body government the Fédération Internationale de Volleyball (FIVB).

== Results ==
=== FIVB U23 World Championship ===
Champions Runners up Third place Fourth place

FIVB U23 World Championship
Year	Round	Position	Pld	W	L	SW	SL	Squad
(Mexico) 2013	Semifinals	Third						Squad
(Turkey) 2015	Semifinals	4th						Squad
(Slovenia) 2017		9th						Squad
Total	0 titles	3/3						

=== Asian U23 Championship ===
Champions Runners up Third place Fourth place

Asian U23 Championship
Year	Round	Position	Pld	W	L	SW	SL	Squad
(Philippines) 2015	Semifinals	4th						Squad
(Thailand) 2017	Final	1st						Squad
Total	1 Title	2/2						

== Team ==
=== Current squad ===
The following is the Japanese roster in the 2017 FIVB Women's U23 World Championship.

Head coach: Kiyoshi Abo

No.	Name	Date of birth	Height	Weight	Spike	Block	2016–2017 club
1	Misaki Yamauchi (c)	10 March 1995	1.72 m (5 ft 8 in)	69 kg (152 lb)	306 cm (120 in)	295 cm (116 in)	(Japan) NEC Red rockets
2	Nozomi Itoh	16 February 1995	1.78 m (5 ft 10 in)	70 kg (150 lb)	306 cm (120 in)	295 cm (116 in)	(Japan) Toray Arrow
3	Ayaka Sugi	12 April 1996	1.77 m (5 ft 10 in)	72 kg (159 lb)	293 cm (115 in)	282 cm (111 in)	(Japan) Tokyo Women's College
5	Haruka Kanamori	9 April 1996	1.76 m (5 ft 9 in)	66 kg (146 lb)	297 cm (117 in)	285 cm (112 in)	(Japan) Hisamitsu Springs
6	Misaki Shirai	30 July 1996	1.75 m (5 ft 9 in)	71 kg (157 lb)	293 cm (115 in)	280 cm (110 in)	(Japan) Toray Arrow
7	Nanaka Sakamoto	6 September 1996	1.76 m (5 ft 9 in)	65 kg (143 lb)	304 cm (120 in)	294 cm (116 in)	(Japan) Denso Airybees
8	Miki Sakurai	1 May 1996	1.69 m (5 ft 7 in)	62 kg (137 lb)	275 cm (108 in)	265 cm (104 in)	(Japan) Nippon Sport Science University
10	Kaori Mabashi	18 November 1996	1.73 m (5 ft 8 in)	63 kg (139 lb)	295 cm (116 in)	285 cm (112 in)	(Japan) Hitachi Rivale
11	Nanami Hirose	12 May 1997	1.77 m (5 ft 10 in)	61 kg (134 lb)	301 cm (119 in)	295 cm (116 in)	(Japan) NEC Red Rockets
12	Moeri Hanai	17 April 1997	1.66 m (5 ft 5 in)	60 kg (130 lb)	275 cm (108 in)	270 cm (110 in)	(Japan) Nippon Sport Science University
13	Miwako Osanai	19 July 1997	1.74 m (5 ft 9 in)	66 kg (146 lb)	293 cm (115 in)	270 cm (110 in)	(Japan) Hitachi Rivale
16	Rei Kudo	5 December 1997	1.75 m (5 ft 9 in)	65 kg (143 lb)	300 cm (120 in)	295 cm (116 in)	(Japan) Denso Airybees
