= Vietnam women's national under-23 volleyball team =

Vietnam
- Association: Volleyball Federation of Vietnam
- Confederation: AVC
- Head coach: (Vietnam) Nguyễn Tuấn Kiệt

Uniforms
Home	Away	Third

FIVB U23 World Championship
- Appearances: 1 (First in 2019)
- Best result: Cancelled (2019)

Asian U23 Championship
- Appearances: 2 (First in 2017)
- Best result: (bronze) 3rd Place (2017, 2019)
Honours
Asian U23 Championship
Bronze medal – third place	2017 Thailand	Team
Bronze medal – third place	2019 Vietnam	Team

Vietnam women's national under-23 volleyball team (Vietnamese: Đội tuyển bóng chuyền nữ U23 quốc gia Việt Nam) represents Vietnam in women's under-23 volleyball events. It is controlled and managed by the Volleyball Federation of Vietnam (VFF) that is a member of Asian volleyball body Asian Volleyball Confederation (AVC) and the international volleyball body government the Fédération Internationale de Volleyball (FIVB).

== Competition history ==
=== World Championship ===
- (Mexico) 2013 — Did not enter
- (Turkey) 2015 — Did not enter
- (Slovenia) 2017 — Did not qualify
- / (Macau) 2019 — Qualified but cancelled due to Hong Kong protests

=== Asian Championship ===
- (Philippines) 2015 — Did not enter
- (Thailand) 2017 — 3rd Place
- (Vietnam) 2019 — 3rd Place

=== Asian Peace Cup ===
- (Indonesia) 2019 — Winner

== Current squad ==
- Head coach: (Vietnam) Nguyễn Tuấn Kiệt
- Assistant coaches:
  - (Vietnam) Lê Thị Hiền
  - (Vietnam) Nguyễn Trọng Linh

The following 12 players were called for the 2019 AVC Championship:

#	Pos	Name	Date of birth (age)	Height	Weight	Spike	Block	2019 club
1	OH	Dương Thị Hên	August 15, 1998 (age 28)	1.74 m (5 ft 9 in)	56 kg (123 lb)	308 cm (121 in)	293 cm (115 in)	(Vietnam) VTV Bình Điền Long An
2	OP	Đặng Thị Kim Thanh	March 28, 1999 (age 27)	1.79 m (5 ft 10 in)	64 kg (141 lb)	305 cm (120 in)	300 cm (120 in)	(Vietnam) VTV Bình Điền Long An
3	OH	Trần Thị Thanh Thúy (captain)	November 12, 1997 (age 28)	1.93 m (6 ft 4 in)	67 kg (148 lb)	320 cm (130 in)	310 cm (120 in)	(Japan) Denso Airybees
6	L	Lê Thị Yến	April 7, 1997 (age 29)	1.69 m (5 ft 7 in)	62 kg (137 lb)	280 cm (110 in)	270 cm (110 in)	(Vietnam) Kingphar Quảng Ninh
7	OP	Hoàng Thị Kiều Trinh	February 11, 2002 (age 24)	1.75 m (5 ft 9 in)	61 kg (134 lb)	303 cm (119 in)	295 cm (116 in)	(Vietnam) Thông tin LVPB
9	MB	Trần Thị Bích Thủy	December 11, 2000 (age 25)	1.83 m (6 ft 0 in)	64 kg (141 lb)	310 cm (120 in)	302 cm (119 in)	(Thailand) Air Force VC
11	L	Nguyễn Khánh Đang	March 10, 2000 (age 26)	1.59 m (5 ft 3 in)	55 kg (121 lb)	270 cm (106 in)	266 cm (105 in)	(Vietnam) VTV Bình Điền Long An
15	MB	Nguyễn Thị Trinh	May 9, 1997 (age 29)	1.81 m (5 ft 11 in)	60 kg (130 lb)	311 cm (122 in)	304 cm (120 in)	(Vietnam) Đắk Lắk VC
17	OH	Trần Tú Linh	October 10, 1999 (age 27)	1.80 m (5 ft 11 in)	65 kg (143 lb)	310 cm (120 in)	301 cm (119 in)	(Vietnam) Vietinbank VC
18	MB	Lưu Thị Huệ	January 2, 1999 (age 27)	1.85 m (6 ft 1 in)	59 kg (130 lb)	315 cm (124 in)	303 cm (119 in)	(Vietnam) Vietinbank VC
19	S	Đoàn Thị Lâm Oanh	July 6, 1998 (age 28)	1.77 m (5 ft 10 in)	66 kg (146 lb)	297 cm (117 in)	294 cm (116 in)	(Vietnam) Thông tin LVPB
20	S	Nguyễn Thu Hoài	September 16, 1998 (age 28)	1.74 m (5 ft 9 in)	60 kg (130 lb)	295 cm (116 in)	291 cm (115 in)	(Vietnam) Vietinbank VC

Notes:

- ^{OP} Opposite Spiker
- ^{OH} Outside Hitter
- ^{MB} Middle Blocker
- ^{S} Setter
- ^{L} Libero
