= Dương Thị Hên =

Vietnamese volleyball player

Personal information
- Full name: Dương Thị Hên
- Nickname: Ốc tiêu
- Nationality: Vietnam
- Born: August 15, 1998 (age 28); Đức Huệ, Long An, Vietnam
- Height: 1.74 m (5 ft 9 in)
- Weight: 56 kg (123 lb)
- Spike: 303 cm (9 ft 11 in)
- Block: 294 cm (9 ft 8 in)

Volleyball information
- Position: Outside hitter

Career
Years	Teams
2011 – 2020	(Vietnam) VTV Bình Điền Long An

National team
2016 – 2019; 2017 – 2019; 2016	Vietnam; Vietnam U23; Vietnam U20
Honours
Women's volleyball
Representing Vietnam U23
Asian Championship
Bronze medal – third place	2017 Nakhon Ratchasima	Team
Bronze medal – third place	2019 Hanoi	Team

Dương Thị Hên (born August 15, 1998) is a retired Vietnamese volleyball player. She is a former member of Vietnam women's national volleyball team and VTV Bình Điền Long An club.

Hên has an older sister, Dương Thị Nhàn, who is also a former volleyball player of Vietnam national team and VTV Bình Điền Long An club.

== Clubs ==
- (Vietnam) VTV Bình Điền Long An (2011 – 2020)

== Career ==
=== National teams ===
==== Senior team ====
- 2018 Asian Games — 6th Place
- 2018 Asian Cup — 5th Place

==== U23 team ====
- 2017 Asian Championship — 3rd Place
- 2019 Asian Peace Cup — Champion
- 2019 Asian Championship — 3rd Place

=== Clubs ===
- 2016 Vietnam League – 3rd Place, with VTV Bình Điền Long An
- 2017 Vietnam League – Champion, with VTV Bình Điền Long An
- 2018 Vietnam League – Champion, with VTV Bình Điền Long An

== Awards ==
- 2018 VTV9 - Binh Dien International Cup "Best Young Player"
- 2018 Vietnam League "Best spiker"
