= Đặng Thị Kim Thanh =

Vietnamese volleyball player

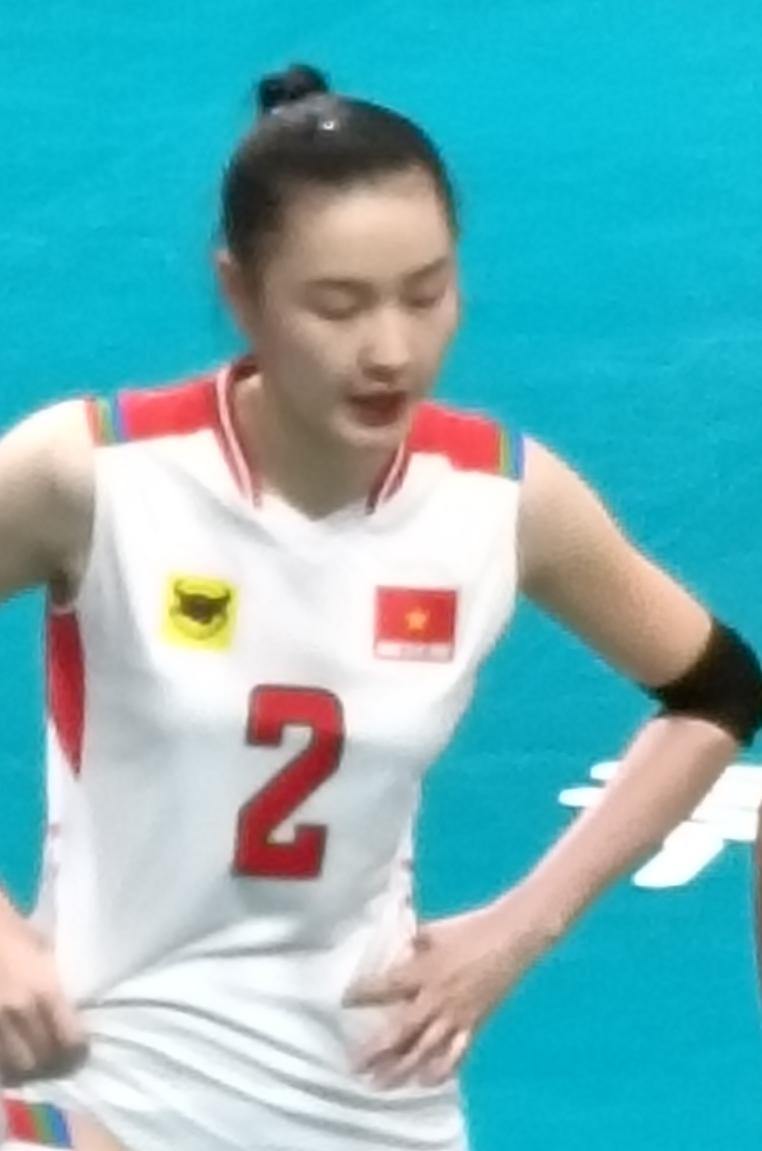
- Kim Thanh in 2025

Personal information
- Full name: Đặng Thị Kim Thanh
- Nickname: Xuka
- Nationality: Vietnam
- Born: March 28, 1999 (age 27) Long An, Vietnam
- Height: 1.78 m (5 ft 10 in)
- Weight: 63 kg (139 lb)
- Spike: 300 cm (9 ft 10 in)
- Block: 295 cm (9 ft 8 in)

Volleyball information
- Position: Middle blocker/Opposite spiker
- Current club: (Vietnam) Ho Chi Minh City VC
- Number: 2 (National team and club)

Career
- Years: Team
- 2011–2026: (Vietnam) VTV Bình Điền Long An
- 2024, 2026–2028: (Vietnam) Ho Chi Minh City VC

National team
- Years: Team
- 2018–2019, 2025–present 2017–2019: Vietnam; Vietnam U23
Honours
Women's volleyball
Representing Vietnam
AVC Cup
Bronze medal – third place	2026 Candon	Team
Southeast Asian Games
Silver medal – second place	2019 Pasig	Team
Silver medal – second place	2025 Bangkok	Team
Representing Vietnam U23
Asian Championship
Bronze medal – third place	2017 Nakhon Ratchasima	Team
Bronze medal – third place	2019 Hanoi	Team

Đặng Thị Kim Thanh (born March 28, 1999) is a Vietnamese volleyball player. She is a member of Vietnam women's national volleyball team and Ho Chi Minh City volleyball club.

Thanh has a younger sister, Đặng Thị Mỹ Duyên, who is currently her teammate at Ho Chi Minh City volleyball club and previously VTV Bình Điền Long An volleyball club.

== Clubs ==
- (Vietnam) VTV Bình Điền Long An (2011 – 2026)
- (Vietnam) Ho Chi Minh City VC (2024, 2026 – 2028)

== Career ==
=== National teams ===
==== Senior team ====
- 2018 Asian Games — 6th Place
- 2018 Asian Cup — 5th Place
- 2019 ASEAN Grand Prix — 4th Place
- 2019 SEA Games — Silver Medal
- 2025 SEA Games — Silver Medal
- 2026 AVC Cup — 3rd Place
- 2026 SEA V Cup – Second Leg — 4th Place

==== U23 team ====
- 2017 Asian Championship — 3rd Place
- 2019 Asian Peace Cup — Champion
- 2019 Asian Championship — 3rd Place

=== Clubs ===
- 2016 Vietnam League – 3rd Place, with VTV Bình Điền Long An
- 2017 Vietnam League – Champion, with VTV Bình Điền Long An
- 2018 Vietnam League – Champion, with VTV Bình Điền Long An
- 2022 Vietnam League – 3rd Place, with VTV Bình Điền Long An
- 2023 Vietnam League – 3rd Place, with VTV Bình Điền Long An
- 2024 Vietnam League – Champion, with VTV Bình Điền Long An
- 2025 AVC Champions League – Runner-up, with VTV Bình Điền Long An
- 2025 Vietnam League – Champion, with VTV Bình Điền Long An
- 2026 Vietnam League – 3rd Place, with VTV Bình Điền Long An

== Awards ==
- 2018 VTV Cup "Best opposite spiker"
- 2018 VTV Cup "Miss volleyball"
- 2019 VTV9 - Binh Dien International Cup "Miss volleyball"
- 2019 VTV Cup "Best opposite spiker"
