= Liu Yanhan =

Chinese volleyball player (born 1993)

Personal information
- Full name: Liu Yanhan
- Nationality: Chinese
- Born: 19 January 1993 (age 33); Liaoning, China
- Hometown: Liaoning, China
- Height: 1.88 m (6 ft 2 in)
- Weight: 75 kg (165 lb)
- Spike: 315 cm (124 in)
- Block: 305 cm (120 in)

Volleyball information
- Position: Wing Spiker
- Current club: Army
- Number: 11

National team
2010-2011; 2013-2015; 2013-	U18, U20-China; U23-China; China
Honours
Women's volleyball
Representing China
FIVB World Cup
Gold medal – first place	2015 Japan	Team
Gold medal – first place	2019 Japan	Team
FIVB Nations League
Bronze medal – third place	2019 Nanjing	Team
Asian Youth Volleyball Championship
Silver medal – second place	2010 Kuala Lumpur	Team
Asian Junior Championship
Gold medal – first place	2010 Ho Chi Minh City	Team
Women's U23 Volleyball
Gold medal – first place	2015 Pasig	Team
Asian Cup
Gold medal – first place	2014 Shenzhen	Team
Gold medal – first place	2018 Nakhon Ratchasima	Team
Asian Games
Silver medal – second place	2014 Incheon	Team
Women's U23 Volleyball World Championship
Gold medal – first place	2013 Tijuana/Mexicali	Team
- Last updated: April 2015

Liu Yanhan (simplified Chinese: 刘晏含; traditional Chinese: 劉晏含; pinyin: Liú Yànhán; born 19 January 1993 in Liaoning) is a Chinese volleyball player. She is an outside spiker and an opposite spiker. She won the 2015 and 2019 FIVB Volleyball Women's World Cup, and she was the Best Outside Spiker in 2019 FIVB Volleyball Women's Nations League.

== Awards ==
- 2010 U18 Asian Championship – "Best spiker"
- 2010 U18 Asian Championship – "Best blocker"
- 2010 U20 Asian Championship – "Best spiker"
- 2010 U20 Asian Championship – "Most valuable player"
- 2014 Asian Cup – "Best outside spikers"
- 2014–15 Chinese League – "Most valuable player"
- 2015 U23 Asian Championship – "Most valuable player"
- 2015 U23 Asian Championship – "Best outside spiker"
- 2016 Asian Club Championship – "Best outside spiker"
- 2018 Asian Cup – "Most valuable player"
- 2019 FIVB Nations League – "Best outside spiker"
