= Volleyball at the 2018 Asian Games – Women's tournament =

Women's volleyball tournament won by China

Women at the 2018 Asian Games
- Venue: Gelora Bung Karno Tennis Indoor; Bulungan Sports Hall
- Date: 19 August – 1 September 2018
- Competitors: 151 from 11 nations

Medalists
gold medal	China
silver medal	Thailand
bronze medal	South Korea

The women's tournament in volleyball at the 2018 Asian Games was the 18th edition of the event at an Asian Games, organised by the Asian Volleyball Confederation in conjunction with the OCA. It was held in Jakarta, Indonesia from 19 August to 1 September 2018.

== Squads ==
China	Chinese Taipei	Hong Kong	India
Yuan Xinyue; Zhu Ting; Hu Mingyuan; Gong Xiangyu; Zeng Chunlei; Liu Xiaotong; Yao Di; Li Yingying; Diao Linyu; Lin Li; Ding Xia; Yan Ni; Wang Mengjie; Duan Fang	Lai Xiang-chen; Hsiao Hsiang-ling; Lee Yu; Kuo Ching-yi; Hsieh Yi-chen; Huang Hsin-yu; Chang Li-yun; Chen Hsi; Yang Meng-hua; Lee Tzu-ying; Chen Tzu-ya; Chang Yu-chia; Tseng Wan-ling; Huang Ching-hsuan	Thyllis Law; Fung Tsz Yan; Tsang Sze Nga; Chan Eu Eu; Fung Wing Yan; Chim Wing Lam; Yu Ying Chi; Yeung Sau Mei; Pang Wing Lam; Lam Yee Ting; Ho Kin Yiu; Tsui Ka Yee; Helen Ip; Koo Yung Yung	Priyanka Khedkar; Aswathi Raveendran; Rekha Sreesailam; Anju Balakrishnan; Soorya S. Pillai; Jini Kovat Shaji; Ruksana Khatun; Nirmal Tanwar Bhati; Sruthi Murali; Aswani Kandoth; Anusri Ghosh; Anjali Babu; Minimol Abraham; K. P. Anusree
Indonesia	Japan	Kazakhstan	Philippines
Yulis Indahyani; Megawati Hangestri Pertiwi; Berllian Marsheilla; Yolana Bheta Pangestika; Amalia Fajrina Nabila; Amasya Anggraini Manganang; Aprilia Santini Manganang; Nandita Ayu Salsabila; Arsela Nuari Purnama; Tri Retno Mutiara Lutfi; Asih Titi Pangestuti; Hany Budiarti; Wilda Nurfadhilah; Novia Andriyanti	Miyu Nagaoka; Nana Iwasaka; Risa Shinnabe; Erika Shinomiya; Yuki Ishii; Haruyo Shimamura; Koyomi Iwasaki; Yurie Nabeya; Miya Sato; Mai Okumura; Kotoe Inoue; Mako Kobata; Rika Nomoto; Ai Kurogo	Tatyana Fendrikova; Sana Anarkulova; Yekaterina Zhdanova; Natalya Akilova; Inna Yakovleva; Katerina Tatko; Yana Petrenko; Radmila Beresneva; Alessya Safronova; Aliya Batkuldina; Kristina Anikonova; Kristina Belova; Kristina Karapetan	Alyssa Valdez; Jaja Santiago; Dawn Macandili; Mylene Paat; Mika Reyes; Kim Fajardo; Maika Ortiz; Cha Cruz-Behag; Jia Morado; Denden Lazaro; Majoy Baron; Kim Kianna Dy; Dindin Santiago-Manabat; Aby Maraño
South Korea	Thailand	Vietnam	
Park Eun-jin; Lee Ju-ah; Jung Ho-young; Hwang Min-kyoung; Lee Hyo-hee; Yim Myung-ok; Kim Yeon-koung; Kim Su-ji; Park Jeong-ah; Yang Hyo-jin; Kang So-hwi; Lee Jae-yeong; Lee Da-yeong; Na Hyun-jung	Piyanut Pannoy; Pornpun Guedpard; Thatdao Nuekjang; Pleumjit Thinkaow; Onuma Sittirak; Hattaya Bamrungsuk; Wilavan Apinyapong; Nootsara Tomkom; Chitaporn Kamlangmak; Malika Kanthong; Pimpichaya Kokram; Ajcharaporn Kongyot; Chatchu-on Moksri; Supattra Pairoj	Dương Thị Hên; Đặng Thị Kim Thanh; Trần Thị Thanh Thúy; Đinh Thị Trà Giang; Nguyễn Thị Kim Liên; Nguyễn Linh Chi; Đinh Thị Thúy; Nguyễn Thị Trinh; Bùi Thị Ngà; Lê Thanh Thúy; Lưu Thị Huệ; Nguyễn Thu Hoài	

== Results ==
All times are Western Indonesia Time (UTC+07:00)

=== Preliminary ===
==== Pool A ====
Pos	Team	Pld	W	L	Pts	SW	SL	SR	SPW	SPL	SPR	Qualification
1	Thailand	4	4	0	12	12	1	12.000	322	221	1.457	Quarterfinals
2	Japan	4	3	1	9	9	3	3.000	290	197	1.472	Quarterfinals
3	Indonesia	4	2	2	6	7	8	0.875	315	328	0.960	Quarterfinals
4	Philippines	4	1	3	3	4	9	0.444	260	310	0.839	Quarterfinals
5	Hong Kong	4	0	4	0	1	12	0.083	190	321	0.592	Classification for 9–11

Source: OCA

Date	Time	Venue		Score		Set 1	Set 2	Set 3	Set 4	Set 5	Total	Report
19 Aug	12:30	GBK	Philippines	0–3	Thailand	22–25	12–25	15–25			49–75	Report
19 Aug	19:00	GBK	Japan	3–0	Indonesia	25–20	25–11	25–19			75–50	Report
21 Aug	16:30	Bulun.	Philippines	0–3	Japan	12–25	15–25	21–25			48–75	Report
21 Aug	19:00	GBK	Hong Kong	1–3	Indonesia	25–21	13–25	18–25	14–25		70–96	Report
23 Aug	12:30	Bulun.	Hong Kong	0–3	Philippines	18–25	21–25	22–25			61–75	Report
23 Aug	19:00	GBK	Thailand	3–0	Japan	25–20	27–25	25–20			77–65	Report
25 Aug	16:30	Bulun.	Thailand	3–0	Hong Kong	25–6	25–11	25–20			75–37	Report
25 Aug	19:00	GBK	Indonesia	3–1	Philippines	25–20	25–20	24–26	25–22		99–88	Report
27 Aug	10:00	GBK	Japan	3–0	Hong Kong	25–4	25–7	25–11			75–22	Report
27 Aug	16:30	GBK	Indonesia	1–3	Thailand	19–25	25–20	13–25	13–25		70–95	Report

==== Pool B ====
Pos	Team	Pld	W	L	Pts	SW	SL	SR	SPW	SPL	SPR	Qualification
1	China	5	5	0	15	15	0	MAX	375	216	1.736	Quarterfinals
2	South Korea	5	4	1	12	12	4	3.000	382	299	1.278	Quarterfinals
3	Kazakhstan	5	2	3	7	9	10	0.900	386	406	0.951	Quarterfinals
4	Vietnam	5	2	3	6	8	11	0.727	369	406	0.909	Quarterfinals
5	Chinese Taipei	5	2	3	4	7	13	0.538	370	441	0.839	Classification for 9–11
6	India	5	0	5	1	2	15	0.133	292	406	0.719	Classification for 9–11

Source: OCA

Date	Time	Venue		Score		Set 1	Set 2	Set 3	Set 4	Set 5	Total	Report
19 Aug	10:00	GBK	China	3–0	Vietnam	25–11	25–15	25–13			75–39	Report
19 Aug	16:30	GBK	Chinese Taipei	1–3	Kazakhstan	15–25	10–25	25–20	20–25		70–95	Report
19 Aug	16:30	Bulun.	South Korea	3–0	India	25–17	25–11	25–13			75–41	Report
21 Aug	10:00	GBK	India	0–3	Vietnam	18–25	22–25	13–25			53–75	Report
21 Aug	12:30	GBK	South Korea	3–1	Kazakhstan	25–9	25–14	28–30	25–20		103–73	Report
21 Aug	16:30	GBK	China	3–0	Chinese Taipei	25–10	25–14	25–14			75–38	Report
23 Aug	10:00	GBK	Kazakhstan	3–0	India	25–8	25–19	25–23			75–50	Report
23 Aug	12:30	GBK	Vietnam	2–3	Chinese Taipei	13–25	25–19	19–25	25–16	11–15	93–100	Report
23 Aug	16:30	GBK	South Korea	0–3	China	21–25	16–25	16–25			53–75	Report
25 Aug	12:30	GBK	Vietnam	0–3	South Korea	20–25	15–25	19–25			54–75	Report
25 Aug	16:30	GBK	Kazakhstan	0–3	China	14–25	15–25	11–25			40–75	Report
25 Aug	19:00	Bulun.	India	2–3	Chinese Taipei	25–23	21–25	25–18	18–25	13–15	102–106	Report
27 Aug	12:00	GBK	China	3–0	India	25–18	25–19	25–9			75–46	Report
27 Aug	16:30	Bulun.	Kazakhstan	2–3	Vietnam	25–20	25–19	27–29	19–25	7–15	103–108	Report
27 Aug	19:00	GBK	Chinese Taipei	0–3	South Korea	24–26	9–25	23–25			56–76	Report

=== Classification for 9–11 ===
Semifinals for 9–11
29 August
Hong Kong	0
India	3

Classification 9–10
31 August
Chinese Taipei	3
India	0

==== Semifinals for 9–11 ====
Date	Time	Venue		Score		Set 1	Set 2	Set 3	Set 4	Set 5	Total	Report
29 Aug	16:30	Bulun.	Hong Kong	0–3	India	18–25	16–25	13–25			47–75	Report

==== Classification 9–10 ====
Date	Time	Venue		Score		Set 1	Set 2	Set 3	Set 4	Set 5	Total	Report
31 Aug	09:00	Bulun.	Chinese Taipei	3–0	India	25–21	25–16	25–15			75–52	Report

=== Final round ===
Quarterfinals
29 August
Thailand	3
Vietnam	0
29 August
Indonesia	0
South Korea	3
29 August
Philippines	0
China	3
29 August
Japan	3
Kazakhstan	0

Semifinals
31 August
Thailand	3
South Korea	1
31 August
China	3
Japan	0

Gold medal match
1 September
Thailand	0
China	3
Bronze medal match
1 September
South Korea	3
Japan	1

Semifinals for 5–8
31 August
Vietnam	3
Indonesia	1
31 August
Philippines	2
Kazakhstan	3

Classification 5–6
1 September
Vietnam	1
Kazakhstan	3
Classification 7–8
1 September
Indonesia	3
Philippines	1

==== Quarterfinals ====
Date	Time	Venue		Score		Set 1	Set 2	Set 3	Set 4	Set 5	Total	Report
29 Aug	10:30	GBK	Thailand	3–0	Vietnam	25–23	25–16	25–20			75–59	Report
29 Aug	12:30	GBK	Japan	3–0	Kazakhstan	25–16	25–18	25–21			75–55	Report
29 Aug	16:30	GBK	Indonesia	0–3	South Korea	22–25	13–25	18–25			53–75	Report
29 Aug	19:00	GBK	Philippines	0–3	China	15–25	9–25	7–25			31–75	Report

==== Semifinals for 5–8 ====
Date	Time	Venue		Score		Set 1	Set 2	Set 3	Set 4	Set 5	Total	Report
31 Aug	09:00	GBK	Vietnam	3–1	Indonesia	29–27	18–25	25–22	25–22		97–96	Report
31 Aug	14:30	GBK	Philippines	2–3	Kazakhstan	11–25	25–22	15–25	25–19	14–16	90–107	Report

==== Semifinals ====
Date	Time	Venue		Score		Set 1	Set 2	Set 3	Set 4	Set 5	Total	Report
31 Aug	17:00	GBK	Thailand	3–1	South Korea	25–15	25–20	20–25	25–22		95–82	Report
31 Aug	19:30	GBK	China	3–0	Japan	25–22	25–10	25–20			75–52	Report

==== Classification 7–8 ====
Date	Time	Venue		Score		Set 1	Set 2	Set 3	Set 4	Set 5	Total	Report
01 Sep	10:00	Bulun.	Indonesia	3–1	Philippines	25–17	23–25	25–19	25–20		98–81	Report

==== Classification 5–6 ====
Date	Time	Venue		Score		Set 1	Set 2	Set 3	Set 4	Set 5	Total	Report
01 Sep	12:30	Bulun.	Vietnam	1–3	Kazakhstan	18–25	25–22	22–25	24–26		89–98	Report

==== Bronze medal match ====
Date	Time	Venue		Score		Set 1	Set 2	Set 3	Set 4	Set 5	Total	Report
01 Sep	12:30	GBK	South Korea	3–1	Japan	25–18	21–25	25–15	27–25		98–83	Report

==== Gold medal match ====
Date	Time	Venue		Score		Set 1	Set 2	Set 3	Set 4	Set 5	Total	Report
01 Sep	16:30	GBK	Thailand	0–3	China	19–25	17–25	13–25			49–75	Report

== Final standing ==
Rank	Team	Pld	W	L
1st place, gold medalist(s)	China	8	8	0
2nd place, silver medalist(s)	Thailand	7	6	1
3rd place, bronze medalist(s)	South Korea	8	6	2
4	Japan	7	4	3
5	Kazakhstan	8	4	4
6	Vietnam	8	3	5
7	Indonesia	7	3	4
8	Philippines	7	1	6
9	Chinese Taipei	6	3	3
10	India	7	1	6
11	Hong Kong	5	0	5
