= Natthanicha Jaisaen =

Thai volleyball player (born 1998)

Personal information
- Full name: Natthanicha Jaisaen
- Nickname: Nooknik
- Nationality: Thai
- Born: May 21, 1998 (age 28); Manorom, Chainat, Thailand
- Height: 1.72 m (5 ft 8 in)
- Weight: 55 kg (121 lb)
- Spike: 283 cm (111 in)
- Block: 276 cm (109 in)

Volleyball information
- Position: Setter
- Current club: (United States) Grand Rapids Rise
- Number: 24

National team
2014–	Thailand
Honours
Women's volleyball
Representing Thailand
AVC Continental Championship
Gold medal – first place	2026 Tianjin	Team
U-23 Asian Championship
Silver medal – second place	2017 Nakhon Ratchasima	Team
U-20 Asian Championship
Bronze medal – third place	2016 Nakhon Ratchasima	Team
U-18 Asian Championship
Silver medal – second place	2014 Nakhon Ratchasima	Team

Natthanicha Jaisaen (Thai: ณัฐณิชา ใจแสน, born May 21, 1998, in Chainat) is a Thai indoor volleyball player. She is a current member of the Thailand women's national volleyball team. She is currently playing for Diamond Food Volleyball Club.

== Career ==
Jaisaen won silver medal with her U23 national team during the 2015 Asian U23 Asian Championship and the bronze medal at the 2016 Asian Cup Championship.

Jaisaen has represented Thailand in international competitions, including the Volleyball Nations League, and has played professionally in several countries. She has competed in Japan's SV League and other professional leagues, gaining experience at both domestic and international levels.

Jaisaen has represented Thailand in international competitions, including the Volleyball Nations League, and has played professionally in several countries. She has competed in Japan's SV League and other professional leagues, gaining experience at both domestic and international levels.

== Style of play ==
Jaisaen plays as a setter. Her role involves organizing the team's offense, distributing the ball to attackers, and coordinating attacking plays.

She has competed at international level with Thailand and has gained professional experience through participation in overseas leagues, including Japan's SV.LEAGUE.

== Clubs ==
- (Philippines) Bureau of Customs (2016)
- (Thailand) Nakornnont (2016–2017)
- (Thailand) King-Bangkok (2017–2018)
- (Thailand) Quint Air Force (2018–2019)
- (Thailand) Diamond Food (2019–2020)
- (Thailand) Nakhon Ratchasima QminC VC (2020–2021)
- (Thailand) Diamond Food (2021–2024)
- (Vietnam) Than Quảng Ninh VC (2024) (loan)
- (Japan) PFU BlueCats (2024–2025)
- (United States) Grand Rapids Rise (2026–2027)

== Awards ==
=== Individuals ===
- 2014 PEA Junior Championship "Best Setter"
- 2014 Asian Youth Championship "Best Setter"
- 2025–26 Women's Volleyball Thailand League "Best Setter"

=== Clubs ===
- 2016 SVL season – Runner-Up, with Bureau of Customs Transformers
- 2017 Thai-Denmark Super League – Bronze medal, with 3BB Nakornnont
