= China women's national under-23 volleyball team =

Volleyball team

China
- Association: Chinese Volleyball Association
- Confederation: AVC

Uniforms
Home	Away	Third

FIVB U23 World Championship
- Appearances: 3 (First in 2013)
- Best result: (gold) Gold : (2013)

Asian U23 Championship
- Appearances: 1 (First in 2015)
- Best result: (gold) Gold : (2015).

The China women's national under-23 volleyball team represents China in women's under-23 volleyball events, it is controlled and managed by the Chinese Volleyball Association that is a member of Asian volleyball body Asian Volleyball Confederation (AVC) and the international volleyball body government the Fédération Internationale de Volleyball (FIVB).

== Results ==
=== FIVB U23 World Championship ===
Champions Runners up Third place Fourth place

FIVB U23 World Championship
Year	Round	Position	Pld	W	L	SW	SL	Squad
(Mexico) 2013	Final	1st						Squad
(Turkey) 2015		5th						Squad
(Slovenia) 2017		7th						Squad
Total	1 Title	3/3						

=== Asian U23 Championship ===
Champions Runners up Third place Fourth place

Asian U23 Championship
Year	Round	Position	Pld	W	L	SW	SL	Squad
(Philippines) 2015	Final	1st						Squad
(Thailand) 2017	Didn't Compete							
Total	1 Title	1/2						

== Team ==
=== Current squad ===
The following is the Chinese roster in the 2017 FIVB Women's U23 World Championship.

Head coach: Wu Sheng

No.	Name	Date of birth	Height	Weight	Spike	Block	2016–2017 club
2	Gong Meizi	17 April 1995	1.75 m (5 ft 9 in)	75 kg (165 lb)	280 cm (110 in)	270 cm (110 in)	(China) Liaoning
4	Yan Kailun	17 July 1995	1.92 m (6 ft 4 in)	70 kg (150 lb)	315 cm (124 in)	310 cm (120 in)	(China) Bayi
6	Cai Xiaoqing	5 April 1998	1.79 m (5 ft 10 in)	71 kg (157 lb)	305 cm (120 in)	295 cm (116 in)	(China) Henan
7	Huang Ruilei	8 May 1996	1.96 m (6 ft 5 in)	81 kg (179 lb)	303 cm (119 in)	296 cm (117 in)	(China) Henan
9	Jin Ye	1 March 1996	1.87 m (6 ft 2 in)	77 kg (170 lb)	310 cm (120 in)	302 cm (119 in)	(China) Beijing
10	Zhu Yuezhou	27 March 1995	1.85 m (6 ft 1 in)	72 kg (159 lb)	301 cm (119 in)	296 cm (117 in)	(China) Zhejiang
14	Song Meili	23 February 1995	1.86 m (6 ft 1 in)	75 kg (165 lb)	310 cm (120 in)	300 cm (120 in)	(China) Shandong
16	Chen Peiyan	16 September 1999	1.93 m (6 ft 4 in)	79 kg (174 lb)	318 cm (125 in)	309 cm (122 in)	(China) Guangdong
17	Yu Jiarui	23 October 1997	1.80 m (5 ft 11 in)	74 kg (163 lb)	295 cm (116 in)	290 cm (110 in)	(China) Guangdong
18	Cheng Long (c)	10 January 1995	1.85 m (6 ft 1 in)	75 kg (165 lb)	305 cm (120 in)	295 cm (116 in)	(China) Shandong
19	Lei Yanxi	20 January 1995	1.86 m (6 ft 1 in)	70 kg (150 lb)	310 cm (120 in)	305 cm (120 in)	(China) Yunnan
20	Wang Yunlu	20 May 1996	1.92 m (6 ft 4 in)	82 kg (181 lb)	310 cm (120 in)	301 cm (119 in)	(China) Bayi
