= Pimpichaya Kokram =

Thai volleyball player (born 1998)

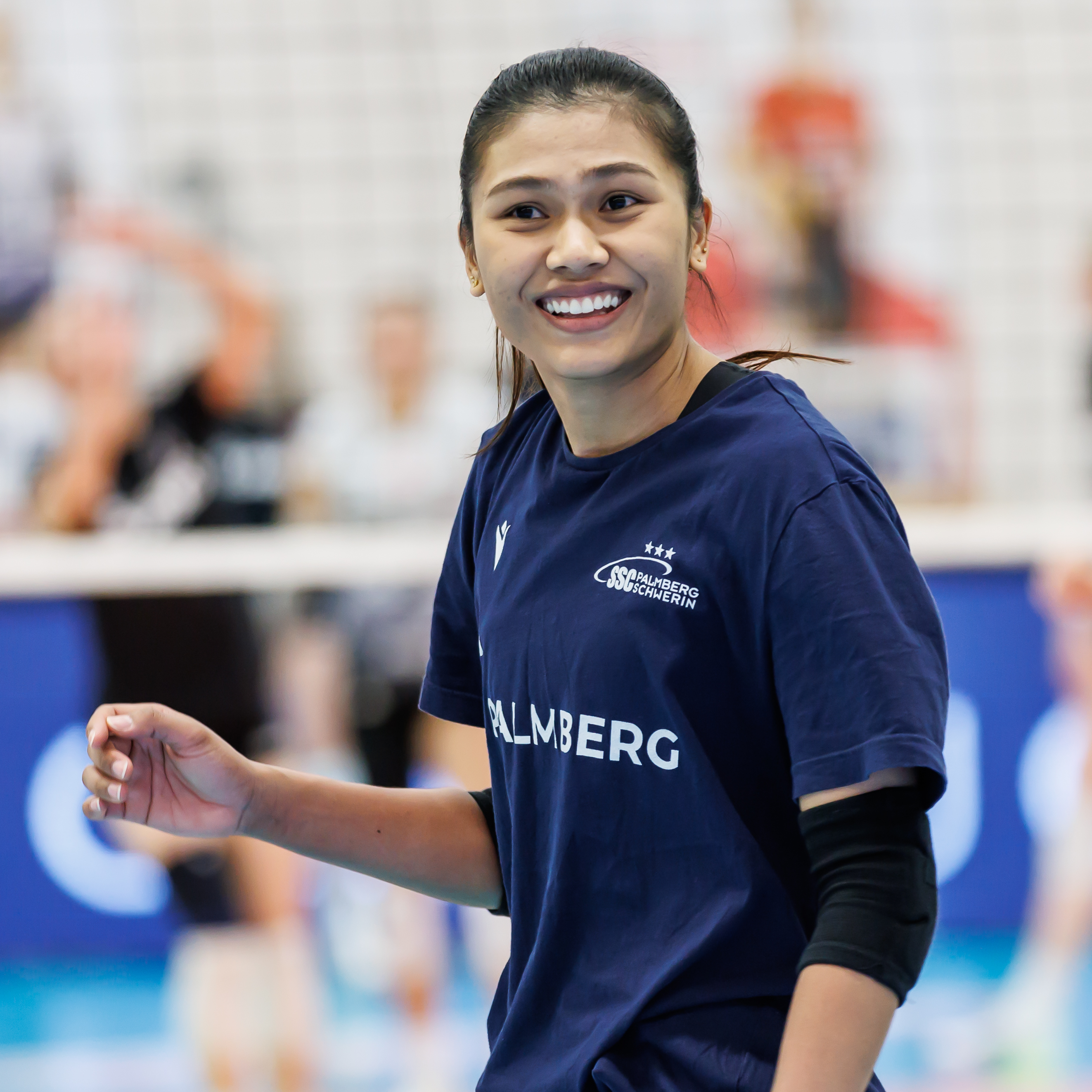
- 2025 at Schweriner SC

Personal information
- Nickname: Beem
- Nationality: Thai
- Born: 16 June 1998 (age 28); Buriram, Thailand
- Height: 1.80 m (5 ft 11 in)
- Weight: 63 kg (139 lb)
- Spike: 310 cm (122 in)
- Block: 303 cm (119 in)

Volleyball information
- Position: Opposite spiker
- Current club: (France) Vandoeuvre Nancy Volley Ball
- Number: 16 (National team)

National team
2015–	Thailand
Honours
Women's volleyball
Representing Thailand
Montreux Volley Masters
Silver medal – second place	2016 Switzerland	Team
Asian Games
Silver medal – second place	2018 Jakarta/Palembang	Team
Bronze medal – third place	2022 Hangzhou	Team
Bronze medal – third place	2026 Aichi/Nagoya	Team
Asian Championship
Gold medal – first place	2023 Nakhon Ratchasima	Team
Gold medal – first place	2026 Tianjin	Team
Silver medal – second place	2017 Biñan	Team
Silver medal – second place	2019 Seoul	Team
Asian Cup
Bronze medal – third place	2016 Vĩnh Phúc	Team
U-23 Asian Championship
Silver medal – second place	2015 Philippines	Team
Silver medal – second place	2017 Nakhon Ratchasima	Team
U-20 Asian Championship
Bronze medal – third place	2016 Nakhon Ratchasima	Team
U-18 Asian Championship
Silver medal – second place	2014 Nakhon Ratchasima	Team
Southeast Asian Games
Gold medal – first place	2015 Singapore	Team
Gold medal – first place	2017 Kuala Lumpur	Team
Gold medal – first place	2019 Philippines	Team
ASEAN Grand Prix
Gold medal – first place	2019 Nakhon Ratchasima	Team

Pimpichaya Kokram (Thai: พิมพิชยา ก๊กรัมย์, RTGS: Phimphitchaya Kokram, born 1998 June 16 ) is a Thai volleyball player. She is a current member of the Thailand women's national volleyball team.

== Career ==
She participated at the 2015 FIVB Volleyball Women's U23 World Championship, 2016 FIVB Volleyball World Grand Prix, 2018 FIVB Volleyball Women's Nations League, and 2018 FIVB Volleyball Women's World Championship.

Pimpichaya Kokram played the FIVB World Grand Prix, as substitute. After winning three games in Group 1 (Serbia 3-2, Germany 3-0 and Belgium 3-1), Thailand finished in ninth place.

== Clubs ==
- (Thailand) Nonthaburi (2014–2018)
- (Indonesia) Bandung Bank BJB Pakuan (2018–2019)
- (Thailand) Nonthaburi (2019–2021)
- (Japan) Kurobe AquaFairies (2021–2024)
- (Germany) Schweriner SC (2024–2025)
- (France) Vandoeuvre Nancy Volley Ball (2025–2026)
- (United States) LOVB Atlanta (2026-)

== Awards ==
=== Individuals ===
- 2014 PEA Junior Championship – "Best opposite spiker"
- 2014 U17 Asian Championship – "Best opposite spiker"
- 2015 U23 Asian Championship – "Best opposite spiker"
- 2015 PEA Junior Championship – "Best opposite spiker"
- 2016 U19 ASEAN Championship – "Best opposite spiker"
- 2016 U19 Asian Championship – "Best opposite spiker"
- 2016 Thai PBS Championship – "Most valuable player"
- 2017 U23 Asian Championship – "Best opposite spiker"
- 2017 Montreux Volley Masters – "Special awards Crowd favorite"
- 2018 Asian Cup – "Best opposite spiker"
- 2019 Indonesian Proliga – "Best scorer"
- 2022 ASEAN Grand Prix - "Most Valuable Player"
- 2025 SEA V.League - "Most Valuable Player"

=== Club ===
- 2017 Thai–Denmark Super League - Bronze medal, with 3BB Nakornnont
- 2018 Thai–Denmark Super League - Bronze medal, with 3BB Nakornnont
- 2018–19 Thailand League - Third, with 3BB Nakornnont
- 2019 Thai–Denmark Super League - Third, with 3BB Nakornnont

== Royal decoration ==
- 2023 – Companion (Fourth Class) of The Most Admirable Order of the Direkgunabhorn

Awards
Preceded by (Kazakhstan) Yekaterina Zhdanova	Best Opposite of Asian Cup; 2018	Succeeded by TBA
