= Nguyễn Thị Trinh =

Vietnamese volleyball player (born 1997)

Personal information
- Full name: Nguyễn Thị Trinh
- Nickname: Trinh "điện"
- Nationality: Vietnam
- Born: May 9, 1997 (age 29) Đắk Lắk, Vietnam
- Height: 1.81 m (5 ft 11 in)
- Weight: 60 kg (132 lb)
- Spike: 305 cm (10 ft 0 in)
- Block: 300 cm (9 ft 10 in)

Volleyball information
- Position: Middle blocker
- Current club: (Vietnam) LP Bank Ninh Bình
- Number: 15 (National team and club)

Career
- Years: Team
- 2011 – 2013, 2018 – 2021: (Vietnam) Đắk Lắk VC
- 2014 – 2017: (Vietnam) VTV Bình Điền Long An
- 2022 – present: (Vietnam) LP Bank Ninh Bình
- 2023: (Vietnam) Sport Center 1 (selected team)

National team
- Years: Team
- 2016 – present 2017 – 2019: Vietnam; Vietnam U23
Honours
Women's volleyball
Representing Vietnam
Challenger Cup
Bronze medal – third place	2024 Manila	Team
Asian Nations Cup
Gold medal – first place	2023 Gresik	Team
Gold medal – first place	2024 Manila	Team
Gold medal – first place	2025 Hanoi	Team
Southeast Asian Games
Silver medal – second place	2019 Pasig	Team
Silver medal – second place	2021 Quảng Ninh	Team
Silver medal – second place	2023 Phnom Penh	Team
SEA V.League
Gold medal – first place	2025 Ninh Bình	Team
Silver medal – second place	2022 Nakhon Ratchasima	Team
Silver medal – second place	2023 Vĩnh Phúc	Team
Silver medal – second place	2024 Vĩnh Phúc / Nakhon Ratchasima	Team
Silver medal – second place	2025 Nakhon Ratchasima	Team
Representing Vietnam U23
Asian Championship
Bronze medal – third place	2017 Nakhon Ratchasima	Team
Bronze medal – third place	2019 Hanoi	Team

Nguyễn Thị Trinh (born May 9, 1997) is a Vietnamese volleyball player. She is a member of Vietnam women's national volleyball team and LP Bank Ninh Bình club.

== Clubs ==
- (Vietnam) Đắk Lắk VC (2011 – 2013, 2018 – 2021)
- (Vietnam) VTV Bình Điền Long An (2014 – 2017)
- (Vietnam) LP Bank Ninh Bình (2022 – )
- (Vietnam) Sport Center 1 (2023) (selected team)

== Career ==
=== National teams ===
==== Senior team ====
- 2016 Asian Cup — 7th Place
- 2018 Asian Games — 6th Place
- 2018 Asian Cup — 5th Place
- 2019 ASEAN Grand Prix — 4th Place
- 2019 SEA Games — Silver Medal
- 2021 SEA Games — Silver Medal
- 2022 Asian Cup — 4th Place
- 2022 ASEAN Grand Prix — Runner-up
- 2023 SEA Games — Silver Medal
- 2023 Asian Challenge Cup — Champion
- 2023 FIVB Challenger Cup — 8th Place
- 2023 SEA V.League – First Leg — Runner-up
- 2023 Asian Championship — 4th Place
- 2022 Asian Games — 4th Place
- 2024 Asian Challenge Cup — Champion
- 2024 FIVB Challenger Cup — 3rd Place
- 2024 SEA V.League — Runner-up
- 2025 Asian Nations Cup — Champion
- 2025 SEA V.League – First Leg — Runner-up
- 2025 SEA V.League – Second Leg — Champion
- 2025 World Championship — 31st Place

==== U23 team ====
- 2017 Asian Championship — 3rd Place
- 2019 Asian Peace Cup — Champion
- 2019 Asian Championship — 3rd Place

=== Clubs ===
- 2014 Vietnam League – Runner-up, with VTV Bình Điền Long An
- 2015 Vietnam League – 3rd Place, with VTV Bình Điền Long An
- 2016 Vietnam League – 3rd Place, with VTV Bình Điền Long An
- 2017 Vietnam League – Champion, with VTV Bình Điền Long An
- 2023 Vietnam League – Champion, with LP Bank Ninh Bình
- 2023 Asian Club Championship – Champion, with Sport Center 1
- 2024 Asian Club Championship — Runner-up, with LP Bank Ninh Bình
- 2024 Vietnam League – 3rd Place, with LP Bank Ninh Bình
- 2025 Vietnam League – Runner-up, with LP Bank Ninh Bình

== Awards ==
- 2019 Asian U23 Volleyball Championship "Best middle blocker"
- 2022 ASEAN Grand Prix "Best middle blocker"
- 2024 VTV9 - Binh Dien International Cup "Best middle blocker"
- 2024 VTV Cup "Best middle blocker"
