= 2019 Asian Women's U23 Volleyball Championship =

2019 Asian Women's U23 Championship

Tournament details
- Host country: Vietnam
- Dates: July 13 – 21, 2019
- Teams: 13 (from 1 confederation)
- Venues: 2 (in 1 host city)

Final positions
- Champions: China (2nd title)
- Runners-up: North Korea
- Third place: Vietnam
- Fourth place: Thailand

Tournament awards
- MVP: (China) Wu Han

Tournament statistics
- Matches played: 40
- Attendance: 28,910 (723 per match)

The 2019 Asian Women's U23 Volleyball Championship was the 3rd edition of the Asian Women's U23 Volleyball Championship, a biennial international volleyball tournament organised by the Asian Volleyball Confederation (AVC). It was held in Hanoi, Vietnam from July 13 to 21, 2019.

== Pools composition ==
Pool A	Pool B	Pool C	Pool D
Vietnam (Host; 3)	Thailand (2)	Chinese Taipei (4)	Kazakhstan (5)
New Zealand (11)	Australia (10)	China (–)	Hong Kong (6)
~~Turkmenistan (–)~~	North Korea (–)	India (–)	Sri Lanka (–)
Maldives (–)			Macau (–)

== Pool standing procedure ==
1. Numbers of matches won
2. Match points
3. Sets ratio
4. Points ratio
5. Result of the last match between the tied teams

Match won 3–0 or 3–1: 3 match points for the winner, 0 match points for the loser.
Match won 3–2: 2 match points for the winner, 1 match point for the loser.

== Venues ==
Venue	Capacity	Location	Matches
Gia Lâm Gymnasium	3,500	Gia Lâm, Hà Nội	Group A, B, C; Pool E, F; Final round
Tây Hồ Gymnasium	1,500	Tây Hồ, Hà Nội	Group D; Pool G, H; Classification round

== Preliminary round ==
- All times are Vietnam Standard Time (UTC+07:00).

=== Group A ===
Pos	Team	Pld	W	L	Pts	SW	SL	SR	SPW	SPL	SPR	Qualification
1	Vietnam	2	2	0	6	6	0	MAX	150	46	3.261	Pool E
2	New Zealand	2	1	1	3	3	3	1.000	116	106	1.094	Pool E
3	Maldives	2	0	2	0	0	6	0.000	36	150	0.240	Pool G

Date	Time		Score		Set 1	Set 2	Set 3	Set 4	Set 5	Total	Report
13 Jul	20:30	New Zealand	0–3	Vietnam	12–25	10–25	19–25			41–75	P2
14 Jul	20:00	Maldives	0–3	New Zealand	10–25	15–25	6–25			31–75	P2
15 Jul	20:00	Vietnam	3–0	Maldives	25–1	25–2	25–2			75–5	P2

=== Group B ===
Pos	Team	Pld	W	L	Pts	SW	SL	SR	SPW	SPL	SPR	Qualification
1	North Korea	2	2	0	6	6	1	6.000	180	151	1.192	Pool F
2	Thailand	2	1	1	3	4	3	1.333	178	159	1.119	Pool F
3	Australia	2	0	2	0	0	6	0.000	103	151	0.682	Pool H

Date	Time		Score		Set 1	Set 2	Set 3	Set 4	Set 5	Total	Report
13 Jul	15:00	Thailand	1–3	North Korea	25–17	22–25	19–25	36–38		102–105	P2
14 Jul	15:00	North Korea	3–0	Australia	25–14	25–19	25–16			75–49	P2
15 Jul	17:30	Thailand	3–0	Australia	25–15	25–15	26–24			76–54	P2

=== Group C ===
Pos	Team	Pld	W	L	Pts	SW	SL	SR	SPW	SPL	SPR	Qualification
1	China	2	2	0	6	6	0	MAX	150	86	1.744	Pool E
2	Chinese Taipei	2	1	1	3	3	3	1.000	134	115	1.165	Pool E
3	India	2	0	2	0	0	6	0.000	67	150	0.447	Pool G

Date	Time		Score		Set 1	Set 2	Set 3	Set 4	Set 5	Total	Report
13 Jul	17:30	Chinese Taipei	0–3	China	17–25	22–25	20–25			59–75	P2
14 Jul	17:30	India	0–3	Chinese Taipei	18–25	12–25	10–25			40–75	P2
15 Jul	15:00	China	3–0	India	25–7	25–10	25–10			75–27	P2

=== Group D ===
Pos	Team	Pld	W	L	Pts	SW	SL	SR	SPW	SPL	SPR	Qualification
1	Kazakhstan	3	3	0	9	9	0	MAX	226	102	2.216	Pool F
2	Hong Kong	3	2	1	6	6	3	2.000	194	150	1.293	Pool F
3	Macau	3	1	2	3	3	7	0.429	162	253	0.640	Pool H
4	Sri Lanka	3	0	3	0	1	9	0.111	150	245	0.612	Pool H

Date	Time		Score		Set 1	Set 2	Set 3	Set 4	Set 5	Total	Report
13 Jul	15:00	Sri Lanka	0–3	Hong Kong	13–25	14–25	7–25			34–75	P2
13 Jul	17:30	Kazakhstan	3–0	Macau	25–10	25–8	25–9			75–27	P2
14 Jul	15:00	Macau	3–1	Sri Lanka	20–25	25–22	25–21	25–17		95–85	P2
14 Jul	17:30	Kazakhstan	3–0	Hong Kong	25–11	25–9	26–24			76–44	P2
15 Jul	15:00	Kazakhstan	3–0	Sri Lanka	25–6	25–15	25–10			75–31	P2
15 Jul	17:30	Hong Kong	3–0	Macau	25–12	25–16	25–12			75–40	P2

== Second round ==
- The results and the points of the matches between the same teams that were already played during the preliminary round shall be taken into account for the classification round
- All times are Vietnam Standard Time (UTC+07:00).

=== Pool E ===
Pos	Team	Pld	W	L	Pts	SW	SL	SR	SPW	SPL	SPR	Qualification
1	China	3	3	0	9	9	1	9.000	248	173	1.434	Final round
2	Vietnam	3	2	1	6	7	4	1.750	237	223	1.063	Final round
3	Chinese Taipei	3	1	2	3	4	6	0.667	218	219	0.995	Final round
4	New Zealand	3	0	3	0	0	9	0.000	137	225	0.609	Final round

Date	Time		Score		Set 1	Set 2	Set 3	Set 4	Set 5	Total	Report
17 Jul	12:30	China	3–0	New Zealand	25–15	25–22	25–10			75–47	P2
17 Jul	20:00	Vietnam	3–1	Chinese Taipei	20–25	25–22	25–21	25–16		95–84	P2
18 Jul	15:00	New Zealand	0–3	Chinese Taipei	19–25	12–25	18–25			49–75	P2
18 Jul	20:00	Vietnam	1–3	China	14–25	15–25	25–23	13–25		67–98	P2

=== Pool F ===
Pos	Team	Pld	W	L	Pts	SW	SL	SR	SPW	SPL	SPR	Qualification
1	North Korea	3	3	0	9	9	3	3.000	297	259	1.147	Final round
2	Thailand	3	2	1	6	7	3	2.333	252	215	1.172	Final round
3	Kazakhstan	3	1	2	3	4	6	0.667	224	219	1.023	Final round
4	Hong Kong	3	0	3	0	1	9	0.111	163	243	0.671	Final round

Date	Time		Score		Set 1	Set 2	Set 3	Set 4	Set 5	Total	Report
17 Jul	15:00	North Korea	3–1	Hong Kong	25–16	25–17	17–25	25–10		92–68	P2
17 Jul	17:30	Kazakhstan	0–3	Thailand	17–25	20–25	22–25			59–75	P2
18 Jul	12:30	North Korea	3–1	Kazakhstan	25–17	24–26	26–24	25–22		100–89	P2
18 Jul	17:30	Thailand	3–0	Hong Kong	25–19	25–15	25–17			75–51	P2

=== Pool G ===
Pos	Team	Pld	W	L	Pts	SW	SL	SR	SPW	SPL	SPR	Qualification
1	India	1	1	0	3	3	0	MAX	75	23	3.261	Ninth – Eleventh place match
2	Maldives	1	0	1	0	0	3	0.000	23	75	0.307	Thirteenth place due to Withdrawn

Date	Time		Score		Set 1	Set 2	Set 3	Set 4	Set 5	Total	Report
17 Jul	15:00	Maldives	0–3	India	10–25	8–25	5–25			23–75	P2

=== Pool H ===
Pos	Team	Pld	W	L	Pts	SW	SL	SR	SPW	SPL	SPR	Qualification
1	Australia	2	2	0	6	6	1	6.000	172	116	1.483	Ninth place match
2	Macau	2	1	1	3	3	4	0.750	146	160	0.913	Ninth – Eleventh place match
3	Sri Lanka	2	0	2	0	2	6	0.333	150	192	0.781	Twelfth place

Date	Time		Score		Set 1	Set 2	Set 3	Set 4	Set 5	Total	Report
17 Jul	17:30	Australia	3–1	Sri Lanka	25–19	25–11	22–25	25–10		97–65	P2
18 Jul	15:00	Australia	3–0	Macau	25–15	25–19	25–17			75–51	P2

== Classification round ==
- All Times are Vietnam Standard Time (UTC+07:00).

=== Classification 9th–11th ===
==== 9th–11th semifinals ====
Date	Time		Score		Set 1	Set 2	Set 3	Set 4	Set 5	Total	Report
19 Jul	15:00	India	3–0	Macau	25–14	25–19	25–12			75–45	P2

==== 9th place match ====
Date	Time		Score		Set 1	Set 2	Set 3	Set 4	Set 5	Total	Report
20 Jul	15:00	India	1–3	Australia	17–25	19–25	25–11	19–25		80–86	P2

== Final round ==
- All times are Vietnam Standard Time (UTC+07:00).

Quarterfinals
19 Jul
China	3
Hong Kong	0
19 Jul
Thailand	3
Chinese Taipei	0
19 Jul
Vietnam	3
Kazakhstan	1
19 Jul
North Korea	3
New Zealand	0

Semifinals
20 Jul
China	3
Thailand	0
20 Jul
Vietnam	1
North Korea	3

Final
21 Jul
China	3
North Korea	0
3rd place
21 Jul
Vietnam	3
Thailand	1

5th–8th place
20 Jul
Hong Kong	0
Chinese Taipei	3
20 Jul
Kazakhstan	3
New Zealand	0

5th place
21 Jul
Chinese Taipei	3
Kazakhstan	2
7th place
21 Jul
Hong Kong	3
New Zealand	2

=== Quarterfinals ===
Date	Time		Score		Set 1	Set 2	Set 3	Set 4	Set 5	Total	Report
19 Jul	12:30	North Korea	3–0	New Zealand	25–8	25–17	25–19			75–44	P2
19 Jul	15:00	China	3–0	Hong Kong	25–15	25–13	25–12			75–40	P2
19 Jul	17:30	Thailand	3–0	Chinese Taipei	25–14	25–18	29–27			79–59	P2
19 Jul	20:00	Vietnam	3–1	Kazakhstan	25–14	19–25	25–21	25–16		94–76	P2

=== 5th–8th semifinals ===
Date	Time		Score		Set 1	Set 2	Set 3	Set 4	Set 5	Total	Report
20 Jul	12:30	Hong Kong	0–3	Chinese Taipei	15–25	22–25	23–25			60–75	P2
20 Jul	15:00	Kazakhstan	3–0	New Zealand	25–12	25–17	25–17			75–46	P2

=== Semifinals ===
Date	Time		Score		Set 1	Set 2	Set 3	Set 4	Set 5	Total	Report
20 Jul	17:30	Vietnam	1–3	North Korea	25–18	20–25	24–26	21–25		90–94	P2
20 Jul	20:00	China	3–0	Thailand	25–14	25–21	25–21			75–56	P2

=== 7th place ===
Date	Time		Score		Set 1	Set 2	Set 3	Set 4	Set 5	Total	Report
21 Jul	12:30	Hong Kong	3–2	New Zealand	25–17	25–10	24–26	25–27	15–11	114–91	P2

=== 5th place ===
Date	Time		Score		Set 1	Set 2	Set 3	Set 4	Set 5	Total	Report
21 Jul	15:00	Chinese Taipei	3–2	Kazakhstan	25–20	21–25	23–25	27–25	15–11	111–106	P2

=== 3rd place ===
Date	Time		Score		Set 1	Set 2	Set 3	Set 4	Set 5	Total	Report
21 Jul	17:30	Vietnam	3–1	Thailand	14–25	25–22	25–21	25–14		89–82	P2

=== Final ===
Date	Time		Score		Set 1	Set 2	Set 3	Set 4	Set 5	Total	Report
21 Jul	20:00	China	3–0	North Korea	25–16	25–19	25–18			75–53	P2

== Final standing ==
Rank	Team
1st place, gold medalist(s)	China
2nd place, silver medalist(s)	North Korea
3rd place, bronze medalist(s)	Vietnam
4	Thailand
5	Chinese Taipei
6	Kazakhstan
7	Hong Kong
8	New Zealand
9	Australia
10	India
11	Macau
12	Sri Lanka
13	Maldives

2019 Asian U23 champions

China
2nd title

== Medalists ==
Gold	Silver	Bronze
China	North Korea	Vietnam

== Awards ==
- Most valuable player
  (China) Wu Han
- Best opposite spiker
  (China) Sun Jie
- Best outside spikers
  (North Korea) Son Hyang Mi
  (Vietnam) Trần Thị Thanh Thúy
- Best middle blocker
  (China) Gao Yi
  (Vietnam) Nguyễn Thị Trinh
- Best setter
  (North Korea) Ri Jong Hyang
- Best libero
  (Thailand) Jidapa Nahuanong

== Broadcasting rights ==
Territory	Channel
AVC partner	SMMTV
Thailand	Thairath TV
Vietnam	Thể Thao TV

== See also ==
- 2019 Asian Men's U23 Volleyball Championship
