= Trần Thị Thanh Thúy =

Vietnamese volleyball player (born 1997)

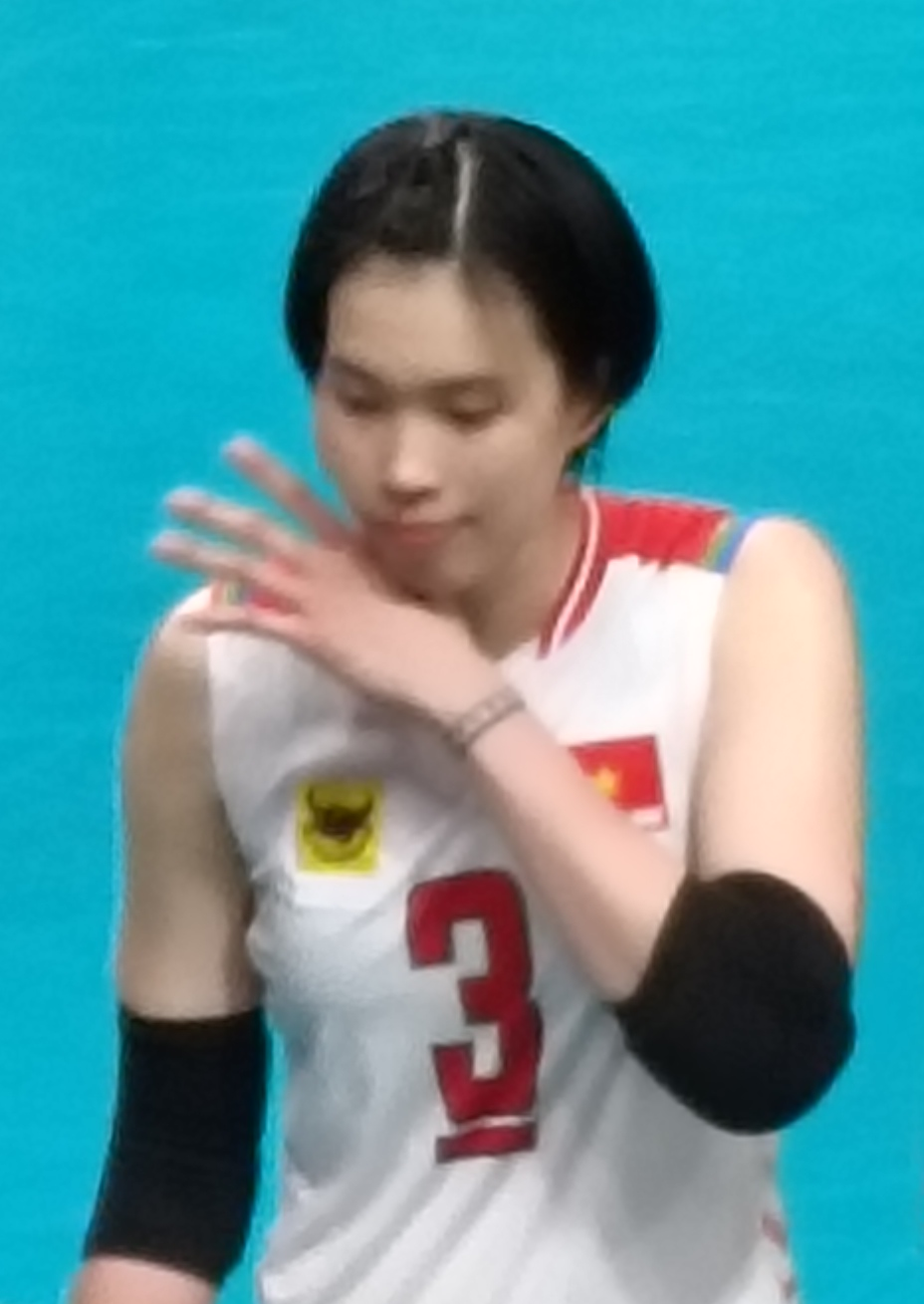
- Thanh Thúy in 2025

Personal information
- Full name: Trần Thị Thanh Thúy
- Nickname: 4T
- Nationality: Vietnam
- Born: November 12, 1997 (age 29) Dĩ An, Bình Dương, Vietnam
- Height: 1.93 m (6 ft 4 in)
- Weight: 74 kg (163 lb)
- Spike: 320 cm (10 ft 6 in)
- Block: 310 cm (10 ft 2 in)

Volleyball information
- Position: Outside hitter
- Current club: (Japan) Gunma Green Wings
- Number: 3 (National team); 16 (Club)

Career
- Years: Team
- 2010 – 2026: (Vietnam) VTV Bình Điền Long An
- 2015 – 2016: (Thailand) Bangkok Glass
- 2017 – 2019: (Chinese Taipei) Attack Line VC
- 2019 – 2020: (Japan) Denso Airybees
- 2021 – 2024: (Japan) PFU BlueCats
- 2023: (Vietnam) Sport Center 1 (selected team)
- 2024: (Turkey) Kuzeyboru
- 2024 – 2025: Gresik Petrokimia Pupuk Indonesia
- 2025 – present: (Japan) Gunma Green Wings

National team
- Years: Team
- 2014 – present 2017 – 2019: Vietnam; Vietnam U23
Honours
Women's volleyball
Representing Vietnam
Challenger Cup
Bronze medal – third place	2024 Manila	Team
AVC Cup
Gold medal – first place	2023 Gresik	Team
Gold medal – first place	2024 Manila	Team
Gold medal – first place	2025 Hanoi	Team
Bronze medal – third place	2026 Candon	Team
Southeast Asian Games
Silver medal – second place	2015 Singapore	Team
Silver medal – second place	2019 Pasig	Team
Silver medal – second place	2021 Quảng Ninh	Team
Silver medal – second place	2023 Phnom Penh	Team
Silver medal – second place	2025 Bangkok	Team
Bronze medal – third place	2017 Kuala Lumpur	Team
SEA V Cup
Gold medal – first place	2025 Ninh Bình	Team
Silver medal – second place	2022 Nakhon Ratchasima	Team
Silver medal – second place	2023 Vĩnh Phúc	Team
Silver medal – second place	2024 Vĩnh Phúc	Team
Silver medal – second place	2025 Nakhon Ratchasima	Team
Silver medal – second place	2026 Hanoi	Team
Representing Vietnam U23
Asian Championship
Bronze medal – third place	2017 Nakhon Ratchasima	Team
Bronze medal – third place	2019 Hanoi	Team

Trần Thị Thanh Thuý (born November 12, 1997) is a Vietnamese female volleyball player. She is a member of the Vietnam women's national volleyball team since 2014 and is the captain of the team.

== Early life ==
While her family is originally from Hà Nam, Thanh Thuý was born and raised in Bình Dương. Her father worked in the transportation sector, while her mother was a teacher. When she was 12, while never having played volleyball before, Thanh Thuý had developed a passion for the sport and followed matches, attending games. Her height at the time of 1.78 meters (5’10) caught the attention of women's club VTV Bình Điền Long An. Because Thanh Thuý was so much taller than other players her age, the club’s coaching staff had to verify through multiple sources to confirm that she was indeed only 12 years old. Former head coach Lương Khương Thượng personally visited her home to persuade her family to let her learn and play volleyball. Thanh Thuý's parents initially refused, preferring that she focus on academics and believing that a career in sports would be demanding and uncertain. After attempts at persuasion, Thanh Thuý’s family agreed to let her train volleyball, and she joined the youth team of Bình Điền Long An, which is considered one of the leading volleyball training centers in Vietnam. When Thanh Thuý first tried out for the youth team, some of her teammates suspected that she was lying about her age due to her height.

Many of my teammates all thought I was lying about my age, which made me feel very embarrassed. At the time, I cried a lot, but thanks to the encouragement of my coaches and teachers, I was able to overcome that first challenge.

— Trần Thị Thanh Thúy

At the youth team, coach Lương Khương Thượng designed a personalized training program specifically for Thanh Thuý. Thanh Thuý spent three years training, honing her skills, and gaining competitive experience with the youth squad.

== Career ==
=== 2013-2015 ===
During the period when outside hitter Kim Đính was sidelined with an injury, Thanh Thuý was promoted from the youth team to the senior team to take part in the 2013 VTV Bình Điền Cup, despite being not even 16. Veteran player and former captain Nguyễn Thị Ngọc Hoa praised her, along with Lê Thanh Thuý, as two standout faces of the tournament who "would take the Vietnam women’s volleyball scene by storm."

In 2014, Thanh Thuý was officially moved up to the senior team. She became a player in helping the club win the runner-up position at the Volleyball Vietnam League, and also participated in the 2014 VTV Cup as a strategic substitute. By 2015, Thanh Thuý had grown to a height of 1.90 meters (6ft2). That year, she continued competing with VTV Bình Điền Long An, earned the title of Promising Young Player at the 2015 VTV Bình Điền Cup, and won the Hùng Vương Cup.

On the national team level, Thanh Thuý represented Vietnam at the 2015 Asian Women's Volleyball Championship, the 2015 SEA Games, and the 2015 VTV International Women's Volleyball Cup.

=== 2016–2017 ===
On January 4, 2016, Thanh Thuý signed with the Thai Bangkok Glass Volleyball Club that had won the AVC Women's Volleyball Champions League. She competed in the second leg of the season and helped the team successfully defend their title at the 2015–16 Women's Volleyball Thailand League. That same year, Thanh Thuý was offered a four-year scholarship to study at Oregon State University in the United States, but was unable to go due to her ongoing playing commitments. Later in 2016, she took part in the 2016 VTV International Women's Volleyball Cup where she earned the award for Best Outside Hitter. Toward the end of 2016, Thanh Thuý struggled with her performance in the second round of the Vietnam League and declined Bangkok Glass’s invitation to return for the 2016–17 Women's Volleyball Thailand League.

In 2017, Thanh Thuý represented both her club VTV Bình Điền Long An in the 2017 Vietnam League and the VTV9 Bình Điền Cup and the Vietnam national team at the 2017 VTV Cup, 2017 Asian Women's Volleyball Championship, Asian Women's U23 Volleyball Championship, and the 2017 SEA Games. She was named Best Outside Hitter at both the VTV Cup and the Asian Women's U23 Volleyball Championship, and capped off the year by helping VTV Bình Điền Long An win the Vietnam National Championship.

=== 2017–2019: Competing in Taiwan and Vietnam ===
In the 2017–2018 season, Thanh Thuý joined the Taiwanese club Attack Line, becoming the first Vietnamese volleyball player to play for a club outside Southeast Asia. She established herself as the team’s leading outside hitter, scoring herself 147 points in 8 matches. In 2018, Thanh Thuý returned to VTV Bình Điền Long An to compete in the 2018 Vietnam League, helping the club successfully defend their national title. With the national team, she took part in the 2018 VTV International Women's Volleyball Cup, 2018 Asian Games, and the Asian Cup.

After the conclusion of the 2018 Vietnam League, Thanh Thuý went back to Taiwan to continue playing for Attack Line. In the 2018–2019 Top Volleyball League she appeared in another 8 matches and scored 158 points. At the 2019 Asian Women's U23 Volleyball Championship, she was named Best Outside Hitter and helped Vietnam secure a third-place finish. At the 2019 ASEAN Grand Prix (first leg), Thanh Thuý and her teammates lost all three matches, finishing fourth out of four teams.

=== 2019–2024: Competing in Japan ===
In the 2019–2020 season, Thanh Thuý joined the Japanese women’s volleyball club Denso Airybees. During that season, she had "limited playing time". While Denso Airybees offered her a contract extension, Thanh Thuý decided to return to Vietnam and competed in the 2020 Vietnam League. In the first half of 2021, she helped VTV Bình Điền Long An win the Hoa Lư Cup, finishing second in Group B of the first round of the 2021 Vietnam League, and won the 2021 Hùng Vương Cup.

In June 2021, another Japanese club, the PFU BlueCats, reached an agreement with VTV Bình Điền Long An to sign Thanh Thuý. Thanh Thuý played for PFU Blue Cats for three seasons (2021–2024). She was mostly used as a middle blocker, which was not her preferred outside hitter position.

Between 2022 and 2023, Thanh Thuý had call-ups to the national team for tournaments. In 2022, she competed at the 2021 SEA Games, the 2022 Asian Women's Volleyball Cup, and the 2022 ASEAN Grand Prix. In 2023, Thanh Thuý represented Vietnam at the 2023 AVC Women's Challenge Cup, the 2022 Asian Games, the 2023 Asian Women's Club Volleyball Championship, the FIVB Women’s Club World Championship, and the FIVB Challenger Cup. At the Asian Challenge Cup and the Asian Club Championship, she earned two individual awards: Most Valuable Player (MVP) and Best Outside Hitter. Thanh Thuý helped Vietnam secure the championship title at the Asian Challenge Cup.

In 2024, while playing in Japan, Thanh Thuý underwent a knee injury. Wanting to return to competition quickly, she resumed training before fully recovering, which led to recurrences of the injury. By April 2024, Thanh Thuý's contract with PFU Blue Cats had expired, and she returned to Vietnam to take part in the 2024 VTV9 – Binh Dien International Women's Volleyball Cup. The following month, Thanh Thuý was named in the squad for the 2024 AVC Women's Challenge Cup, and did not play in any matches due to her lingering knee injury. After Vietnam won the tournament and qualified for the 2024 FIVB Women's Volleyball Challenger Cup, she returned to Ho Chi Minh City for treatment before rejoining the national team, where she was officially registered on the roster for the tournament.

=== 2024–2025: Injuries affecting performance ===
In April 2024, the Turkish women’s volleyball club Kuzeyboru announced that they had signed Thanh Thuý. Due to the lingering effects of the knee injury Thanh Thuý underwent earlier in the year, it prevented her from reaching peak form, and she saw limited playing time with the team. Six months later in November 2024, Kuzeyboru officially announced the termination of Thanh Thuý's contract. Upon returning to Vietnam, Thanh Thuý stated that she had recovered from her injury and expressed her desire to continue her career abroad in another Asian league. In December 2024, the national team captain announced that she had reached an agreement to join Gresik Petrokimia Pupuk Indonesia, a club competing in the Indonesian National League, with plans to begin playing in January 2025. After about a month of competition in Indonesia, Gresik Petrokimia Pupuk announced the end of Thanh Thuý's contract.

Following that, Thanh Thuý rejoined VTV Bình Điền Long An, training and competing with the club in the early months of 2025 in tournaments such as the Hoa Lư Cup, the National Championship, the Hùng Vương Cup, and the 2025 AVC Women's Volleyball Champions League.

=== 2025: Comeback after injury ===
Returning to compete for her home club, VTV Bình Điền Long An, Thanh Thuý continued to be the team’s main scorer. VTV Bình Điền Long An’s performance was 3rd place at the Hoa Lư Cup, 3rd place at the Hùng Vương Cup, and 2nd place in the first phase of the National Championship. In some matches, Thanh Thuý scored as many as 38 to 44 points. In April 2025, she and her club participated in the AVC Women's Volleyball Champions League in the Philippines. Thanh Thuý helped VTV Bình Điền Long A secure the runner-up position and a spot in the FIVB Women's Volleyball Club World Championship. She scored a total of 95 points, ranking third among the tournament’s top scorers, and led the rankings for best first-ball receivers. In most matches, coach Thái Quang Lai placed Thanh Thuý as an opposite hitter instead of her more usual position as an outside hitter. At the end of the tournament, Thanh Thuý was named Best Opposite Hitter and selected for the tournament’s All-Star Team. After the AVC Champions League, she rejoined the national team for upcoming international competitions. Alongside her younger teammate Nguyễn Thị Bích Tuyền, Thanh Thuý was one of the team's two main scorers, playing a role in helping Vietnam win its third consecutive title at the 2025 AVC Women's Volleyball Nations Cup after defeating the Philippines in the final. At the awards ceremony, the national team captain was named Best Outside Hitter and included in the tournament’s All-Star Team.

After the 2025 AVC Women's Volleyball Nations Cup, Thanh Thuý continued to participate in other tournaments with the national team such as the 2025 VTV International Women's Volleyball Cup and the 2025 SEA Women's V.League. She won an additional Best Outside Hitter award at the VTV Cup and was a factor in helping the Vietnam women’s national volleyball team defeat Thailand for the first time in history and claim the championship title during the second leg of the SEA V.League.

Thanh Thuý was one of the 13 national team players who took part in the 2025 FIVB Women's Volleyball World Championship, marking the first time in history that the Vietnam women’s volleyball team participated in a world championship. Placed in a group with Poland, Germany, and Kenya, Vietnam lost all three matches and won one set (against Poland). Thanh Thuý "performed well in the match against Germany but did not truly break through in the two matches against Poland and Kenya".

After the conclusion of the World Championship, Thanh Thuý continued her career overseas. She returned to Japan’s national championship league and joined Gunma Green Wings.

Thanh Thuý will not participate in the second leg of the domestic national league and the 2025 FIVB Volleyball Women's Club World Championship taking place at the end of 2025 with her parent club.

== Clubs played in ==
- (Vietnam) VTV Bình Điền Long An (2010 – 2026)
- (Thailand) Bangkok Glass (2015 – 2016)
- (Chinese Taipei) Attack Line VC (2017 – 2019)
- (Japan) Denso Airybees (2019 – 2020)
- (Japan) PFU BlueCats (2021 – 2024)
- (Vietnam) Sport Center 1 (2023) (selected team)
- (Turkey) Kuzeyboru (2024)
- Gresik Petrokimia Pupuk Indonesia (2024 – 2025)
- (Japan) Gunma Green Wings (2025 – present)

== Achievements ==
=== National team ===
==== Senior team ====
- 2014 Asian Cup — 8th Place
- 2015 Asian Championship — 5th Place
- 2015 SEA Games — Silver Medal
- 2016 Asian Cup — 7th Place
- 2017 Asian Championship — 5th Place
- 2017 SEA Games — Bronze Medal
- 2018 Asian Games — 6th Place
- 2018 Asian Cup — 5th Place
- 2019 ASEAN Grand Prix — 4th Place
- 2019 SEA Games — Silver Medal
- 2021 SEA Games — Silver Medal
- 2022 Asian Cup — 4th Place
- 2022 ASEAN Grand Prix — Runner-up
- 2023 SEA Games — Silver Medal
- 2023 Asian Challenge Cup — Champion
- 2023 FIVB Challenger Cup — 8th Place
- 2023 SEA V.League – First Leg — Runner-up
- 2023 Asian Championship — 4th Place
- 2022 Asian Games — 4th Place
- 2024 Asian Challenge Cup — Champion
- 2024 FIVB Challenger Cup — 3rd Place
- 2024 SEA V.League – First Leg — Runner-up
- 2025 Asian Nations Cup — Champion
- 2025 SEA V.League – First Leg — Runner-up
- 2025 SEA V.League – Second Leg — Champion
- 2025 World Championship — 31st Place
- 2025 SEA Games — Silver Medal
- 2026 AVC Cup — 3rd Place
- 2026 SEA V Cup – First Leg — Runner-up
- 2026 SEA V Cup – Second Leg — 4th Place
- 2026 Asian Championship — 7th Place
- 2026 Asian Games — 7th Place

==== U23 team ====
- 2017 Asian Championship — 3rd Place
- 2019 Asian Peace Cup — Champion
- 2019 Asian Championship — 3rd Place

=== Clubs ===
- 2014 Vietnam League – Runner-up, with VTV Bình Điền Long An
- 2015 Vietnam League – 3rd Place, with VTV Bình Điền Long An
- 2015–16 Thailand League – Champion, with Bangkok Glass
- 2016 Vietnam League – 3rd Place, with VTV Bình Điền Long An
- 2017 Vietnam League – Champion, with VTV Bình Điền Long An
- 2018 Taiwan Enterprise Volleyball League – 3rd Place, with Attack Line VC
- 2018 Vietnam League – Champion, with VTV Bình Điền Long An
- 2022 Vietnam League – 3rd Place, with VTV Bình Điền Long An
- 2023 Asian Club Championship – Champion, with Sport Center 1
- 2025 AVC Champions League – Runner-up, with VTV Bình Điền Long An

== Awards ==
- 2015 VTV9 - Binh Dien International Cup "Best Young Player"
- 2016 VTV9 - Binh Dien International Cup "Best outside hitter"
- 2016 VTV Cup "Best outside hitter"
- 2016 Vietnam League "Best outside hitter"
- 2017 VTV9 - Binh Dien International Cup "Best outside hitter"
- 2017 VTV9 - Binh Dien International Cup "Best Young Player"
- 2017 Asian U23 Volleyball Championship "Best outside hitter"
- 2017 VTV Cup "Best outside hitter"
- 2017 Vietnam League "Best outside hitter"
- 2018 VTV9 - Binh Dien International Cup "Best outside hitter"
- 2018 VTV Cup "Most valuable player"
- 2018 Vietnam League "Most valuable player"
- 2019 VTV9 - Binh Dien International Cup "Best outside hitter"
- 2019 Asian Peace Cup "Best outside hitter"
- 2019 Asian U23 Volleyball Championship "Best outside hitter"
- 2022 ASEAN Grand Prix "Best outside hitter"
- 2023 Asian Club Championship "Best outside hitter"
- 2023 Asian Club Championship "Most valuable player"
- 2023 Asian Challenge Cup "Best outside hitter"
- 2023 Asian Challenge Cup "Most valuable player"
- 2023 SEA V.League – First Leg "Best outside hitter"
- 2023 VTV Cup "Most valuable player"
- 2025 AVC Champions League "Best opposite hitter"
- 2025 Asian Nations Cup "Best outside hitter"
- 2025 VTV Cup "Best outside hitter"
- 2025–26 SV.League Women's All-Star Game "Most valuable player"
- 2026 VTV9 - Binh Dien International Cup "Most valuable player"
- 2026 VTV9 - Binh Dien International Cup "Best outside hitter"
