= Hathairat Jarat =

Thai volleyball player

Personal information
- Full name: Hathairat Jarat
- Nickname: App
- Nationality: Thai
- Born: February 9, 1996 (age 30); Surin, Thailand
- Height: 1.82 m (6 ft 0 in)
- Weight: 69 kg (152 lb)
- Spike: 305 cm (120 in)
- Block: 295 cm (116 in)

Volleyball information
- Position: Middle Blocker
- Current club: Khonkaen Star
- Number: 9

National team
2017–2022	Thailand
Honours
Women's volleyball
Representing Thailand
Asian Championship
Silver medal – second place	2017 Nakhon Ratchasima	Team

Hathairat Jarat (Thai: หทัยรัตน์ จารัตน์, born February 9, 1996, in Khon Kaen) is a Thai indoor volleyball player. She is a current member of the Thailand women's national volleyball team.

== Career ==
She played volleyball with the Nongruawittaya School from 2013–2015. She won the 2017 Asian U23 Championship Best Middle Blocker award.

== Clubs ==
- (Thailand) Thai-Denmark Nongrua (2015–2017)
- (Thailand) Khonkaen Star (2017–2020)
- (Japan) PFU BlueCats (2020–2021)
- (Thailand) Nakhon Ratchasima (2020–2021)
- (Thailand) Khonkaen Star (2021–2023)
- (Thailand) Diamond Food (2023–2024)
- (Thailand) Khonkaen Star (2024–2025)

== Awards ==
=== Individuals ===
- 2017 Asian U23 Championship "Best Middle Blocker"

=== Club ===
- 2019 Thai–Denmark Super League - Third, with Khonkaen Star
- 2020 Thailand League – Runner-up, with Khonkaen Star
