= Asian Women's U23 Volleyball Championship =

International youth volleyball competition

- Current season, competition or edition: 2019 Asian Women's U23 Volleyball Championship
- Sport: Volleyball
- Founded: 2015
- First season: 2015
- No. of teams: 13 (Finals)
- Continent: Asia and Oceania (AVC)
- Most recent champion: China (2nd title)
- Most titles: China (2 title)
- Broadcaster: SMMTV
- Website: Asian Volleyball Confederation

The Asian Women's U23 Volleyball Championship is an international volleyball competition in Asia and Oceania contested by the under 23 Women's national teams of the members of Asian Volleyball Confederation (AVC), the sport's continent governing body. The first championship was held in Pasig, Philippines, in 2015.

The current champion is China, which won the second title at the 2019 tournament. The tournament have been won by two national teams: China with two titles and Japan with one title.

The 2019 Championship took place in Hanoi, Vietnam, from 13 to 21 July. The 2021 Championship was cancelled due to COVID-19 pandemic.

== Results summary ==
Year	Host	Final			Third place match			Teams
Year	Host	Champions	Score	Runners-up	Third-place	Score	Fourth-place	Teams
2015; Details	(Philippines); Pasig	China	3–1	Thailand	South Korea	3–0	Japan	12
2017; Details	(Thailand); Nakhon Ratchasima	Japan	3–2	Thailand	Vietnam	3–0	Chinese Taipei	13
2019; Details	(Vietnam); Hanoi	China	3–0	North Korea	Vietnam	3–1	Thailand	13

=== Teams reaching the top four ===
Team	Champions	Runners-up	3rd place	4th place
China	2 (2015, 2019)			
Japan	1 (2017)			1 (2015)
Thailand		2 (2015, 2017)		1 (2019)
North Korea		1 (2019)		
Vietnam			2 (2017, 2019)	
South Korea			1 (2015)	
Chinese Taipei				1 (2017)

=== Champions by region ===
Federation (Region)	Champion(s)	Number
EAZVA (East Asia)	China (2), Japan (1)	3 titles

== Hosts ==
Times Hosted	Nations	Year(s)
1	Philippines	2015
1	Thailand	2017
1	Vietnam	2019

== Medal summary ==
Rank	Nation	Gold	Silver	Bronze	Total
1	China	2	0	0	2
2	Japan	1	0	0	1
3	Thailand	0	2	0	2
4	North Korea	0	1	0	1
5	Vietnam	0	0	2	2
6	South Korea	0	0	1	1
Totals (6 entries)		3	3	3	9

== Participating nations ==
Team	(Philippines) 2015 (12)	(Thailand) 2017 (13)	(Vietnam) 2019 (13)	Total
Australia	•	10th	9th	2
China	1st	•	1st	2
Chinese Taipei	5th	4th	5th	3
Hong Kong	•	6th	7th	2
India	6th	•	10th	2
Iran	8th	8th	•	2
Japan	4th	1st	•	2
Kazakhstan	9th	5th	6th	3
Macau	11th	13th	11th	3
Malaysia	•	7th	•	1
Maldives	12th	•	12th	2
New Zealand	•	11th	8th	2
North Korea	•	•	2nd	1
Philippines	7th	•	•	1
Sri Lanka	•	12th	13th	2
South Korea	3rd	•	•	1
Thailand	2nd	2nd	4th	3
Uzbekistan	10th	9th	•	2
Vietnam	•	3rd	3rd	2

=== Debut of teams ===
Year	Debutants	Total
2015	China	12
2015	Chinese Taipei	12
2015	India	12
2015	Iran	12
2015	Japan	12
2015	Kazakhstan	12
2015	Macau	12
2015	Maldives	12
2015	Philippines	12
2015	South Korea	12
2015	Thailand	12
2015	Uzbekistan	12
2017	Australia	6
2017	Hong Kong	6
2017	Malaysia	6
2017	New Zealand	6
2017	Sri Lanka	6
2017	Vietnam	6
2019	North Korea	1

== Awards ==
Year	Most Valuable Player
2015	(China) Liu Yanhan
2017	(Japan) Misaki Yamauchi
2019	(China) Wu Han

Year	Best Outside Spikers
2015	(China) Liu Yanhan
2015	(South Korea) Lee So-young
2017	(Thailand) Chatchu-on Moksri
2017	(Vietnam) Trần Thị Thanh Thúy
2019	(North Korea) Son Hyang Mi
2019	(Vietnam) Trần Thị Thanh Thúy

Year	Best Opposite Spiker
2015	(Thailand) Pimpichaya Kokram
2017	(Thailand) Pimpichaya Kokram
2019	(China) Sun Jie

Year	Best Setter
2015	(China) Chen Xintong
2017	(Japan) Miki Sukurai
2019	(North Korea) Ri Jong Hyang

Year	Best Middle Blockers
2015	(China) Zheng Yixin
2015	(Thailand) Hattaya Bamrungsuk
2017	(Japan) Ayaka Sugi
2017	(Thailand) Hathairat Jarat
2019	(China) Gao Yi
2019	(Vietnam) Nguyễn Thị Trinh

Year	Best Libero
2015	(South Korea) Kim Yeong-yeon
2017	(Chinese Taipei) Lai Xiang-chen
2019	(Thailand) Jidapa Nahuanong

== See also ==
- Asian Men's U23 Volleyball Championship
