= 2017 Asian Women's U23 Volleyball Championship =

2017 Asian Women's U23 Championship

Tournament details
- Host country: Thailand
- Dates: 13 – 21 May 2017
- Teams: 13
- Venue: 1 (in 1 host city)

Final positions
- Champions: Japan (1st title)
- Runners-up: Thailand
- Third place: Vietnam
- Fourth place: Chinese Taipei

Tournament awards
- MVP: (Japan) Misaki Yamauchi

The 2017 Asian Women's U23 Volleyball Championship was the 2nd edition of the Asian Women's U23 Volleyball Championship, a biennial international volleyball tournament organised by the Asian Volleyball Confederation (AVC) with Thailand Volleyball Association (TVA). It was held in Nakhon Ratchasima, Thailand from 13 to 21 May 2017. The tournament will serve as the Asian qualifiers for the 2017 FIVB Volleyball Women's U23 World Championship held in Ljubljana and Maribor, Slovenia with the top two ranked teams qualifying for the world championship.

The matches was played in only one stadium in Nakhon Ratchasima: The Mall Nakhon Ratchasima. It was the first time that Thailand and Nakhon Ratchasima had hosted the tournament. As hosts, Thailand automatically participated for the tournament, while the remaining 12 teams (with the withdrawn of South Korea, China, and Philippines).

== Participated teams ==
Central Asia (CAZA)	East Asia (EAZA)	Oceania (OZA)	Southeast Asia (SEAZA)	West Asia (WAZA)
Iran; Kazakhstan; Sri Lanka; Uzbekistan	~~China~~; Chinese Taipei; Hong Kong; Japan; Macau; ~~South Korea~~	Australia; New Zealand	Malaysia; ~~Philippines~~; Thailand (host); Vietnam	

== Pools composition ==
The teams were seeded based on their final ranking at the 2015 Asian Women's U23 Volleyball Championship. The host country and the top 7 ranked teams were seed in the Serpentine system. The 7 remaining teams were drawn on 27 February 2017 in Bangkok, Thailand.

Ranking from the previous edition was shown in brackets except the host (who ranked 2nd) and the teams who did not participate, which were denoted by (-).

Pool A	Pool B	Pool C	Pool D
Thailand (Host)	Japan (4)	Chinese Taipei (5)	~~Philippines (7)~~
Macau (11)	Uzbekistan (10)	Kazakhstan (9)	Iran (8)
Hong Kong (–)	Vietnam (–)	Sri Lanka (–)	Malaysia (–)
		Australia (–)	New Zealand (–)

- China and South Korea withdraw prior to the draw.
- Philippines withdraw after to the draw.

== Venue ==
The tournament was hosted in MCC HALL The Mall Nakhon Ratchasima, located in Mueang Nakhon Ratchasima, Nakhon Ratchasima.

Nakhon Ratchasima
MCC HALL The Mall Nakhon Ratchasima
Capacity: 4,000

== Squads ==
Players born after 1 January 1995 are eligible to compete in the tournament. Each team can register a maximum of 12 players.

== Pool standing procedure ==
1. Numbers of matches won
2. Match points
3. Sets ratio
4. Points ratio
5. Result of the last match between the tied teams

Match won 3–0 or 3–1: 3 match points for the winner, 0 match points for the loser
Match won 3–2: 2 match points for the winner, 1 match point for the loser

== Preliminary round ==
- All times are Indochina Time (UTC+07:00).

=== Pool A ===
Pos	Team	Pld	W	L	Pts	SW	SL	SR	SPW	SPL	SPR	Qualification
1	Thailand	2	2	0	6	6	0	MAX	150	67	2.239	Pool E
2	Hong Kong	2	1	1	2	3	5	0.600	140	153	0.915	Pool E
3	Macau	2	0	2	1	2	6	0.333	106	176	0.602	Pool G

Date	Time		Score		Set 1	Set 2	Set 3	Set 4	Set 5	Total	Report
13 May	16:30	Thailand	3–0	Hong Kong	25–18	25–12	25–9			75–39	P2
14 May	14:00	Macau	0–3	Thailand	12–25	8–25	8–25			28–75	P2
15 May	09:00	Hong Kong	3–2	Macau	20–25	25–3	25–16	16–25	15–9	101–78	P2

=== Pool B ===
Pos	Team	Pld	W	L	Pts	SW	SL	SR	SPW	SPL	SPR	Qualification
1	Japan	2	2	0	6	6	0	MAX	150	77	1.948	Pool F
2	Vietnam	2	1	1	3	3	3	1.000	123	122	1.008	Pool F
3	Uzbekistan	2	0	2	0	0	6	0.000	76	150	0.507	Pool H

Date	Time		Score		Set 1	Set 2	Set 3	Set 4	Set 5	Total	Report
13 May	19:00	Vietnam	3–0	Uzbekistan	25–14	25–17	25–16			75–47	P2
14 May	16:30	Japan	3–0	Vietnam	25–12	25–15	25–21			75–48	P2
15 May	16:30	Uzbekistan	0–3	Japan	6–25	11–25	12–25			29–75	P2

=== Pool C ===
Pos	Team	Pld	W	L	Pts	SW	SL	SR	SPW	SPL	SPR	Qualification
1	Chinese Taipei	3	3	0	9	9	0	MAX	225	149	1.510	Pool E
2	Kazakhstan	3	2	1	5	6	5	1.200	240	198	1.212	Pool E
3	Australia	3	1	2	4	5	7	0.714	240	263	0.913	Pool G
4	Sri Lanka	3	0	3	0	1	9	0.111	151	246	0.614	Pool G

Date	Time		Score		Set 1	Set 2	Set 3	Set 4	Set 5	Total	Report
13 May	09:00	Chinese Taipei	3–0	Sri Lanka	25–15	25–14	25–10			75–39	P2
13 May	14:00	Kazakhstan	3–2	Australia	25–13	25–15	23–25	22–25	15–11	110–89	P2
14 May	11:30	Sri Lanka	0–3	Kazakhstan	14–25	8–25	12–25			34–75	P2
14 May	19:00	Chinese Taipei	3–0	Australia	25–21	25–14	25–20			75–55	P2
15 May	14:00	Chinese Taipei	3–0	Kazakhstan	25–19	25–17	25–19			75–55	P2
15 May	19:00	Australia	3–1	Sri Lanka	25–16	25–23	21–25	25–14		96–78	P2

=== Pool D ===
Pos	Team	Pld	W	L	Pts	SW	SL	SR	SPW	SPL	SPR	Qualification
1	Iran	2	2	0	6	6	0	MAX	153	128	1.195	Pool F
2	Malaysia	2	1	1	3	3	3	1.000	135	122	1.107	Pool F
3	New Zealand	2	0	2	0	0	6	0.000	115	153	0.752	Pool H

Date	Time		Score		Set 1	Set 2	Set 3	Set 4	Set 5	Total	Report
13 May	11:30	Malaysia	3–0	New Zealand	25–23	25–12	25–12			75–47	P2
14 May	09:00	Iran	3–0	Malaysia	25–21	25–23	25–16			75–60	P2
15 May	11:30	New Zealand	0–3	Iran	26–28	22–25	20–25			68–78	P2

== Second round ==
- The results and the points of the matches between the same teams that were already played during the preliminary round shall be taken into account for the classification round
- All times are Indochina Time (UTC+07:00).

=== Pool E ===
Pos	Team	Pld	W	L	Pts	SW	SL	SR	SPW	SPL	SPR	Qualification
1	Thailand	3	3	0	9	9	2	4.500	277	203	1.365	Final round
2	Chinese Taipei	3	2	1	6	7	3	2.333	247	199	1.241	Final round
3	Kazakhstan	3	1	2	3	4	6	0.667	197	216	0.912	Final round
4	Hong Kong	3	0	3	0	0	9	0.000	122	225	0.542	Final round

Date	Time		Score		Set 1	Set 2	Set 3	Set 4	Set 5	Total	Report
16 May	11:30	Chinese Taipei	3–0	Hong Kong	25–16	25–13	25–12			75–41	P2
16 May	16:30	Thailand	3–1	Kazakhstan	24–26	25–21	25–10	25–10		99–67	P2
17 May	11:30	Hong Kong	0–3	Kazakhstan	17–25	10–25	15–25			42–75	P2
17 May	14:00	Thailand	3–1	Chinese Taipei	27–25	23–25	28–26	25–21		103–97	P2

=== Pool F ===
Pos	Team	Pld	W	L	Pts	SW	SL	SR	SPW	SPL	SPR	Qualification
1	Japan	3	3	0	9	9	0	MAX	225	121	1.860	Final round
2	Vietnam	3	2	1	6	6	3	2.000	200	185	1.081	Final round
3	Iran	3	1	2	3	3	6	0.500	169	210	0.805	Final round
4	Malaysia	3	0	3	0	0	9	0.000	149	227	0.656	Final round

Date	Time		Score		Set 1	Set 2	Set 3	Set 4	Set 5	Total	Report
16 May	14:00	Iran	0–3	Vietnam	19–25	17–25	19–25			55–75	P2
16 May	19:00	Japan	3–0	Malaysia	25–14	25–14	25–6			75–34	P2
17 May	16:30	Vietnam	3–0	Malaysia	25–15	27–25	25–15			77–55	P2
17 May	19:00	Japan	3–0	Iran	25–13	25–14	25–12			75–39	P2

=== Pool G ===
Pos	Team	Pld	W	L	Pts	SW	SL	SR	SPW	SPL	SPR	Qualification
1	Australia	2	2	0	6	6	1	6.000	171	128	1.336	Ninth place match
2	Sri Lanka	2	1	1	3	4	4	1.000	178	190	0.937	Eleventh place match
3	Macau	2	0	2	0	1	6	0.167	144	175	0.823	Thirteenth place

Date	Time		Score		Set 1	Set 2	Set 3	Set 4	Set 5	Total	Report
16 May	09:00	Macau	1–3	Sri Lanka	23–25	26–24	21–25	24–26		94–100	P2
18 May	10:00	Macau	0–3	Australia	17–25	14–25	19–25			50–75	P2

=== Pool H ===
Pos	Team	Pld	W	L	Pts	SW	SL	SR	SPW	SPL	SPR	Qualification
1	Uzbekistan	1	1	0	3	3	1	3.000	100	77	1.299	Ninth place match
2	New Zealand	1	0	1	0	1	3	0.333	77	100	0.770	Eleventh place match

Date	Time		Score		Set 1	Set 2	Set 3	Set 4	Set 5	Total	Report
17 May	09:00	Uzbekistan	3–1	New Zealand	25–18	25–27	25–15	25–17		100–77	P2

== Classification round ==
- All Times are Indochina Time (UTC+07:00).

=== Eleventh place match ===
Date	Time		Score		Set 1	Set 2	Set 3	Set 4	Set 5	Total	Report
19 May	09:00	Sri Lanka	1–3	New Zealand	25–16	23–25	20–25	16–25		84–91	P2

=== Ninth place match ===
Date	Time		Score		Set 1	Set 2	Set 3	Set 4	Set 5	Total	Report
20 May	09:00	Australia	1–3	Uzbekistan	23–25	21–25	25–23	24–26		93–99	P2

== Final round ==
- All times are Indochina Time (UTC+07:00).

=== Bracket ===
Fifth place
Kazakhstan	3
Hong Kong	0
Seventh place
Malaysia	3
Iran	2

Fifth Place Play-Offs
Malaysia	0
Kazakhstan	3
Hong Kong	3
Iran	0

Quarterfinals
Thailand	3
Malaysia	0
Vietnam	3
Kazakhstan	0
Japan	3
Hong Kong	0
Chinese Taipei	3
Iran	0

Semifinals
Thailand	3
Vietnam	0
Japan	3
Chinese Taipei	1

Final
Thailand	2
Japan	3
Third place
Vietnam	3
Chinese Taipei	0

=== Quarter-finals ===
Date	Time		Score		Set 1	Set 2	Set 3	Set 4	Set 5	Total	Report
19 May	11:30	Japan	3–0	Hong Kong	25–14	25–14	25–11			75–39	P2
19 May	14:00	Thailand	3–0	Malaysia	25–16	25–14	25–16			75–46	P2
19 May	16:30	Chinese Taipei	3–0	Iran	25–14	25–14	25–18			75–46	P2
19 May	19:00	Vietnam	3–0	Kazakhstan	25–19	25–20	25–14			75–53	P2

=== Fifth place play-offs ===
Date	Time		Score		Set 1	Set 2	Set 3	Set 4	Set 5	Total	Report
20 May	11:30	Hong Kong	3–0	Iran	25–14	25–22	25–18			75–54	P2
20 May	14:00	Malaysia	0–3	Kazakhstan	23–25	15–25	22–25			60–75	P2

=== Semi-finals ===
Date	Time		Score		Set 1	Set 2	Set 3	Set 4	Set 5	Total	Report
20 May	16:30	Thailand	3–0	Vietnam	25–21	25–15	25–20			75–56	P2
20 May	19:00	Japan	3–1	Chinese Taipei	25–18	27–29	25–22	25–10		102–79	P2

=== Seventh place match ===
Date	Time		Score		Set 1	Set 2	Set 3	Set 4	Set 5	Total	Report
21 May	09:00	Iran	2–3	Malaysia	23–25	25–22	23–25	25–22	13–15	109–109	P2

=== Fifth place match ===
Date	Time		Score		Set 1	Set 2	Set 3	Set 4	Set 5	Total	Report
21 May	11:30	Hong Kong	0–3	Kazakhstan	17–25	13–25	15–25			45–75	P2

=== Third place match ===
Date	Time		Score		Set 1	Set 2	Set 3	Set 4	Set 5	Total	Report
21 May	14:00	Vietnam	3–0	Chinese Taipei	25–20	25–19	25–19			75–58	P2

=== Final ===
Date	Time		Score		Set 1	Set 2	Set 3	Set 4	Set 5	Total	Report
21 May	16:30	Thailand	2–3	Japan	25–20	25–16	19–25	25–27	12–15	106–103	P2

== Final standing ==
Rank	Team
1st place, gold medalist(s)	Japan
2nd place, silver medalist(s)	Thailand
3rd place, bronze medalist(s)	Vietnam
4	Chinese Taipei
5	Kazakhstan
6	Hong Kong
7	Malaysia
8	Iran
9	Uzbekistan
10	Australia
11	New Zealand
12	Sri Lanka
13	Macau

Qualified for the 2017 U23 World Championship

2017 Asian U23 champions

Japan
1st title

12–woman roster
Misaki Yamaushi (c), Nozomi Itoh, Ayaka Sugi, Haruka Kanamori, Misaki Shirai, Nanaka Sakamoto, Miki Sakurai, Kaori Mabashi, Moeri Hanai, Miwako Osanai, Rei Kudo, Hikari Kato
Head coach
Kiyoshi Abo

== Medalists ==
Gold	Silver	Bronze
Japan Misaki Yamaushi (c); Nozomi Itoh; Ayaka Sugi; Haruka Kanamori; Misaki Shirai; Nanaka Sakamoto; Miki Sakurai; Kaori Mabashi; Moeri Hanai; Miwako Osanai; Rei Kudo; Hikari Kato	Thailand Anisa Yotpinit; Chutimon Sagorn; Hathairat Jarat; Patcharaporn Sittisad; Thanacha Sooksod; Watchareeya Nuanjam; Pimpichaya Kokram; Natthanicha Jaisaen; Chitaporn Kamlangmak; Tichaya Boonlert; Ajcharaporn Kongyot (c); Chatchu-on Moksri	Vietnam Dương Thị Hên; Đặng Thị Kim Thanh; Trần Thị Thanh Thúy (c); Phạm Thị Nguyệt Anh; Trần Việt Hương; Bùi Thị Nga; Lưu Thị Ly Ly; Trịnh Thị Huyền; Lê Thị Hồng; Nguyễn Thị Trinh; Đoàn Thị Lâm Oanh; Nguyễn Thu Hoài

== Awards ==
- Most valuable player
  (Japan) Misaki Yamauchi
- Best outside spikers
  (Thailand) Chatchu-on Moksri
  (Vietnam) Trần Thị Thanh Thuý
- Best setter
  (Japan) Miki Sukurai
- Best opposite spiker
  (Thailand) Pimpichaya Kokram
- Best middle blocker
  (Japan) Ayaka Sugi
  (Thailand) Hathairat Jarat
- Best libero
  (Chinese Taipei) Lai Xiang-chen

== Broadcasting rights ==
Territory	Channel
AVC partner	SMMTV
Thailand	SMMTV
Thailand	Thairath TV

== See also ==
- 2017 Asian Men's U23 Volleyball Championship
