= 2015 Asian Women's U23 Volleyball Championship =

Volleyball competition

Tournament details
- Host country: Philippines
- Dates: 1 – 9 May 2015
- Teams: 12
- Venue: 1 (in 1 host city)

Final positions
- Champions: China (1st title)

Tournament awards
- MVP: (China) Liu Yanhan

The 2015 Asian Women's U23 Volleyball Championship was held on 1 to 9 May 2015 in Pasig, Philippines. It was the inaugural edition of the tournament. The tournament served as the Asian qualifiers for the 2015 FIVB Volleyball Women's U23 World Championship held in Ankara, Turkey which the top two ranked teams qualified for the world championship. China won the tournament and Liu Yanhan was the most valuable player.

The tournament was organized by the Asian Volleyball Confederation, in association with Larong Volleyball sa Pilipinas, Inc. (LVPI), the newly formed national federation for volleyball in the Philippines.

== Venue ==
All rounds
Pasig, Philippines
PhilSports Arena
Capacity: 10,000
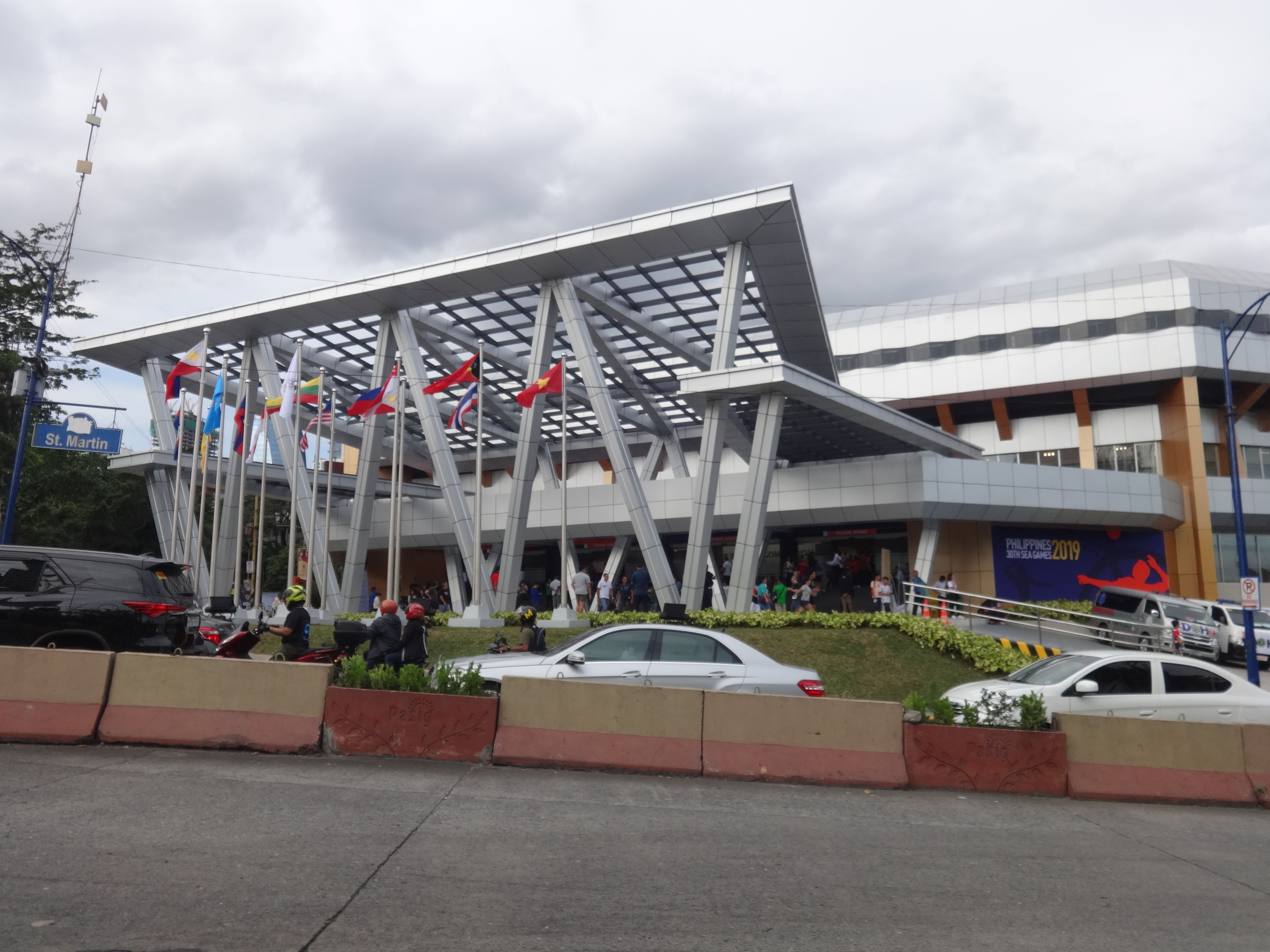

== Pools composition ==
2015 Asian Women's U23 Volleyball Championship Squads List

Pool A	Pool B	Pool C	Pool D
Philippines	China	Japan	South Korea
Kazakhstan	India	Chinese Taipei	Thailand
Iran	Macau	Maldives	Uzbekistan

== Pool standing procedure ==
1. Numbers of matches won
2. Match points
3. Sets ratio
4. Points ratio
5. Result of the last match between the tied teams

Match won 3–0 or 3–1: 3 match points for the winner, 0 match points for the loser
Match won 3–2: 2 match points for the winner, 1 match point for the loser

== Preliminary round ==
- All times are Philippines Standard Time (UTC+08:00).

=== Pool A ===
Pos	Team	Pld	W	L	Pts	SW	SL	SR	SPW	SPL	SPR	Qualification
1	Iran	2	2	0	5	6	3	2.000	191	191	1.000	Pool E
2	Philippines	2	1	1	3	4	3	1.333	167	150	1.113	Pool E
3	Kazakhstan	2	0	2	1	2	6	0.333	158	175	0.903	9th–12th place

Date	Time		Score		Set 1	Set 2	Set 3	Set 4	Set 5	Total	Report
1 May	16:15	Philippines	1–3	Iran	22–25	22–25	25–19	20–25		89–94	Result
2 May	14:30	Kazakhstan	0–3	Philippines	19–25	11–25	26–28			56–78	Result
3 May	15:00	Iran	3–2	Kazakhstan	25–20	18–25	25–19	14–25	15–13	97–102	Result

=== Pool B ===
Pos	Team	Pld	W	L	Pts	SW	SL	SR	SPW	SPL	SPR	Qualification
1	China	2	2	0	6	6	0	MAX	150	75	2.000	Pool F
2	India	2	1	1	3	3	3	1.000	114	118	0.966	Pool F
3	Macau	2	0	2	0	0	6	0.000	79	150	0.527	9th–12th place

Date	Time		Score		Set 1	Set 2	Set 3	Set 4	Set 5	Total	Report
1 May	12:00	India	3–0	Macau	25–10	25–14	25–19			75–43	Result
2 May	16:30	China	3–0	India	25–9	25–13	25–17			75–39	Result
3 May	17:00	Macau	0–3	China	12–25	13–25	11–25			36–75	Result

=== Pool C ===
Pos	Team	Pld	W	L	Pts	SW	SL	SR	SPW	SPL	SPR	Qualification
1	Japan	2	2	0	6	6	1	6.000	175	101	1.733	Pool E
2	Chinese Taipei	2	1	1	3	4	3	1.333	158	120	1.317	Pool E
3	Maldives	2	0	2	0	0	6	0.000	38	150	0.253	9th–12th place

Date	Time		Score		Set 1	Set 2	Set 3	Set 4	Set 5	Total	Report
1 May	19:00	Japan	3–0	Maldives	25–4	25–11	25–3			75–18	Result
2 May	18:30	Chinese Taipei	1–3	Japan	26–24	24–26	23–25	10–25		83–100	Result
3 May	12:00	Maldives	0–3	Chinese Taipei	8–25	8–25	4–25			20–75	Result

=== Pool D ===
Pos	Team	Pld	W	L	Pts	SW	SL	SR	SPW	SPL	SPR	Qualification
1	Thailand	2	2	0	5	6	2	3.000	182	133	1.368	Pool F
2	South Korea	2	1	1	4	5	3	1.667	171	139	1.230	Pool F
3	Uzbekistan	2	0	2	0	0	6	0.000	69	150	0.460	9th–12th place

Date	Time		Score		Set 1	Set 2	Set 3	Set 4	Set 5	Total	Report
1 May	14:00	Uzbekistan	0–3	Thailand	14–25	10–25	13–25			37–75	Result
2 May	12:00	South Korea	3–0	Uzbekistan	25–17	25–8	25–7			75–32	Result
3 May	19:00	Thailand	3–2	South Korea	25–18	25–17	22–25	20–25	15–11	107–96	Result

== Second round ==
- The results and the points of the matches between the same teams that were already played during the preliminary round shall be taken into account for the classification round.

=== Pool E ===
Pos	Team	Pld	W	L	Pts	SW	SL	SR	SPW	SPL	SPR	Qualification
1	Japan	3	3	0	9	9	1	9.000	250	163	1.534	Quarterfinals
2	Chinese Taipei	3	2	1	6	7	4	1.750	254	229	1.109	Quarterfinals
3	Iran	3	1	2	3	3	7	0.429	184	239	0.770	Quarterfinals
4	Philippines	3	0	3	0	2	9	0.222	208	265	0.785	Quarterfinals

Date	Time		Score		Set 1	Set 2	Set 3	Set 4	Set 5	Total	Report
4 May	12:00	Iran	0–3	Chinese Taipei	17–25	21–25	17–25			55–75	Result
4 May	16:15	Japan	3–0	Philippines	25–12	25–18	25–15			75–45	Result
5 May	14:00	Iran	0–3	Japan	13–25	7–25	15–25			35–75	Result
5 May	19:00	Philippines	1–3	Chinese Taipei	25–21	18–25	12–25	19–25		74–96	Result

=== Pool F ===
Pos	Team	Pld	W	L	Pts	SW	SL	SR	SPW	SPL	SPR	Qualification
1	China	3	3	0	8	9	2	4.500	262	175	1.497	Quarterfinals
2	Thailand	3	2	1	5	6	5	1.200	217	233	0.931	Quarterfinals
3	South Korea	3	1	2	5	7	6	1.167	272	265	1.026	Quarterfinals
4	India	3	0	3	0	0	9	0.000	147	225	0.653	Quarterfinals

Date	Time		Score		Set 1	Set 2	Set 3	Set 4	Set 5	Total	Report
4 May	14:00	China	3–2	South Korea	24–26	23–25	25–21	25–21	15–8	112–101	Result
4 May	19:00	Thailand	3–0	India	25–20	25–21	25–21			75–62	Result
5 May	12:00	China	3–0	Thailand	25–13	25–10	25–12			75–35	Result
5 May	16:15	India	0–3	South Korea	18–25	17–25	11–25			46–75	Result

== Classification round ==
=== Classification 9th–12th ===
9th–12th places
4 May
Kazakhstan	3
Maldives	0
5 May
Macau	2
Uzbekistan	3

9th place
8 May
Kazakhstan	3
Uzbekistan	1
11th place
7 May
Maldives	0
Macau	3

==== Semifinals ====
Date	Time		Score		Set 1	Set 2	Set 3	Set 4	Set 5	Total	Report
4 May	10:00	Kazakhstan	3–0	Maldives	25–10	25–4	25–8			75–22	Result
5 May	10:00	Macau	2–3	Uzbekistan	25–19	16–25	23–25	25–23	11–15	100–107	Result

==== 11th place ====
Date	Time		Score		Set 1	Set 2	Set 3	Set 4	Set 5	Total	Report
7 May	10:00	Maldives	0–3	Macau	20–25	11–25	19–25			50–75	Result

==== 9th place ====
Date	Time		Score		Set 1	Set 2	Set 3	Set 4	Set 5	Total	Report
8 May	10:00	Kazakhstan	3–1	Uzbekistan	25–18	25–27	25–19	25–16		100–80	Result

== Final round ==
Quarterfinals
7 May
Japan	3
India	0
7 May
Thailand	3
Iran	1
7 May
China	3
Philippines	1
7 May
Chinese Taipei	2
South Korea	3

Semifinals
8 May
Japan	2
Thailand	3
8 May
China	3
South Korea	0

Final
9 May
Thailand	1
China	3
3rd place
9 May
Japan	0
South Korea	3

5th–8th places
8 May
India	3
Iran	2
8 May
Philippines	0
Chinese Taipei	3

5th place
9 May
India	0
Chinese Taipei	3
7th place
9 May
Iran	0
Philippines	3

=== Quarterfinals ===
Date	Time		Score		Set 1	Set 2	Set 3	Set 4	Set 5	Total	Report
7 May	12:00	Japan	3–0	India	25–17	25–17	25–14			75–48	Result
7 May	14:00	Chinese Taipei	2–3	South Korea	25–16	17–25	25–23	14–25	10–15	91–104	Result
7 May	16:15	China	3–1	Philippines	23–25	25–14	25–18	25–17		98–74	Result
7 May	19:00	Thailand	3–1	Iran	27–29	25–19	25–8	25–13		102–69	Result

=== 5th–8th semifinals ===
Date	Time		Score		Set 1	Set 2	Set 3	Set 4	Set 5	Total	Report
8 May	12:00	Philippines	0–3	Chinese Taipei	17–25	19–25	20–25			56–75	Result
8 May	14:00	India	3–2	Iran	22–25	25–16	19–25	25–20	15–9	106–95	Result

=== Semifinals ===
Date	Time		Score		Set 1	Set 2	Set 3	Set 4	Set 5	Total	Report
8 May	16:15	China	3–0	South Korea	25–13	25–21	25–21			75–55	Result
8 May	19:00	Japan	2–3	Thailand	25–21	25–23	21–25	20–25	13–15	104–109	Result

=== 7th place ===
Date	Time		Score		Set 1	Set 2	Set 3	Set 4	Set 5	Total	Report
9 May	10:00	Philippines	3–0	Iran	25–15	25–21	26–24			76–60	Result

=== 5th place ===
Date	Time		Score		Set 1	Set 2	Set 3	Set 4	Set 5	Total	Report
9 May	12:00	Chinese Taipei	3–0	India	25–17	25–23	25–9			75–49	Result

=== 3rd place ===
Date	Time		Score		Set 1	Set 2	Set 3	Set 4	Set 5	Total	Report
9 May	14:00	South Korea	3–0	Japan	26–24	25–23	25–15			76–62	Result

=== Final ===
Date	Time		Score		Set 1	Set 2	Set 3	Set 4	Set 5	Total	Report
9 May	16:15	China	3–1	Thailand	27–25	21–25	25–21	25–11		98–82	Result

== Final standing ==
Rank	Team
1st place, gold medalist(s)	China
2nd place, silver medalist(s)	Thailand
3rd place, bronze medalist(s)	South Korea
4	Japan
5	Chinese Taipei
6	India
7	Philippines
8	Iran
9	Kazakhstan
10	Uzbekistan
11	Macau
12	Maldives

Qualified for the 2015 World Championship

2015 Asian U23 champions

China
1st title

12–woman roster
Zhang Yu, Chen Xintong, Xu Jiujing, Chen Long, Song Meili, Duan Fang, Zheng Yixin, Liu Yanhan, Wang Qi, Huang Liuyan, Gong Xiangyu, Wang Mengjie
Head coach
Xu Jiande

== Awards ==
- Most valuable player
  (China) Liu Yanhan
- Best outside spikers
  (South Korea) Lee So-young
  (China) Liu Yanhan
- Best setter
  (China) Chen Xintong
- Best opposite spiker
  (Thailand) Pimpichaya Kokram
- Best middle blockers
  (Thailand) Hattaya Bamrungsuk
  (China) Zheng Yixin
- Best libero
  (South Korea) Kim Yeon-gyeon

== Broadcast partners ==
- Sports5 (AksyonTV)

== See also ==
- 2015 Asian Men's U23 Volleyball Championship
