= Chinese Taipei women's national volleyball team =

National sports team

Chinese Taipei
- Association: Chinese Taipei Volleyball Association
- Confederation: AVC
- FIVB ranking: 37 (24 May 2026)

Uniforms
Home	Away

Summer Olympics
- Appearances: 0

World Championship
- Appearances: 2 (First in 1990)
- Best result: 11th (1990)
Honours
Asian Games
Bronze medal – third place	2006 Doha	Team
AVC Cup
Silver medal – second place	2026 Candon	Team
Bronze medal – third place	2023 Gresik	Team
Bronze medal – third place	2025 Hanoi	Team

The Chinese Taipei women's national volleyball team is the women's national volleyball team of Republic of China (Taiwan). (See Chinese Taipei for team naming issue) Controlled by Chinese Taipei Volleyball Association, it represents the country in international competitions and friendly matches.

After 16 years since 1990, Chinese Taipei women's national volleyball team re-entered FIVB Women's Volleyball World Championship in 2006. To everyone's surprise, the 23-ranked team gained their first-ever victory over the host Japan (7th) on the opening day, followed by defeated South Korea (8th), Poland (9th), Kenya (11th), and Costa Rica (33rd) in the first round. However, after a good start of five consecutive victories, the team could not continue their impressing form and eventually took the 12th place.

In December, the same squad attended the 2006 Asian Games held in Doha, Qatar. Although the team lost to South Korea and China in the preliminary round, they later beat Kazakhstan and Thailand and won the bronze medal, the first medal in women's volleyball at Asian Games.

== Results ==
=== Olympic Games ===
- (Japan) 1964 to (United States) 1996 – Did not enter or Did not qualify
- (Australia) 2000 – Did not qualify
- (Greece) 2004 – Did not qualify
- (China) 2008 – Did not qualify
- (United Kingdom) 2012 – Did not qualify
- (Brazil) 2016 – Did not qualify
- (Japan) 2020 – Did not qualify
- (France) 2024 – Did not qualify
- (United States) 2028 – To be determined
- (Australia) 2032 – To be determined

=== FIVB World Cup ===
- (Uruguay) 1973 to (Japan) 2023 – Did not qualify

=== FIVB World Championship ===
- (Soviet Union) 1952 to (Czechoslovakia) 1986 – Did not enter or Did not qualify
- (China) 1990 – 11th place
- (Brazil) 1994 – Did not qualify
- (Japan) 1998 – Did not qualify
- (Germany) 2002 – Did not qualify
- (Japan) 2006 – 12th place
- (Japan) 2010 – Did not qualify
- (Italy) 2014 – Did not qualify
- (Japan) 2018 – Did not qualify
- (Netherlands) (Poland) 2022 – Did not qualify
- (Thailand) 2025 – Did not qualify
- (Canada) (United States) 2027 – To be determined
- (Philippines) 2029 – To be determined

=== FIVB World Grand Prix ===
- (China) 1994 – 12th place
- (China) 1995 to (Italy) 2006 – Did not qualify
- (China) 2007 – 12th place
- (Japan) 2008 – Did not qualify
- (Japan) 2009 – Did not qualify
- (China) 2010 – 12th place
- (Macau) 2011 – Did not qualify
- (China) 2012 – 16th place
- (Japan) 2013 – Did not qualify
- (Japan) 2014 – Did not qualify
- (United States) 2015 – Did not qualify
- (Thailand) 2016 – Did not qualify
- (China) 2017 – Did not qualify

=== FIVB Challenger Cup ===
- (Peru) 2019 – 6th place

=== Asian Games ===
- (China) 1990 – 5th place
- (Japan) 1994 – 4th place
- (Thailand) 1998 – 5th place
- (South Korea) 2002 – 4th place
- (Qatar) 2006 – Bronze medal
- (China) 2010 – 7th place
- (South Korea) 2014 – 5th place
- (Indonesia) 2018 – 9th place
- (China) 2022 – 6th place
- (Japan) 2026 – 5th place

=== Asian Championship ===
- (Australia) 1975 – Did not participate
- (Hong Kong) 1979 – Did not participate
- (Japan) 1983 – 4th place
- (China) 1987 – Did not participate
- (Hong Kong) 1989 – 4th place
- (Thailand) 1991 – 5th place
- (China) 1993 – 4th place
- (Thailand) 1995 – 4th place
- (Philippines) 1997 – 4th place
- (Hong Kong) 1999 – 5th place
- (Thailand) 2001 – 5th place
- (Vietnam) 2003 – 5th place
- (China) 2005 – 5th place
- (Thailand) 2007 – 6th place
- (Vietnam) 2009 – 6th place
- (Taiwan) 2011 – 5th place
- (Thailand) 2013 – 7th place
- (China) 2015 – 4th place
- (Philippines) 2017 – 6th place
- (South Korea) 2019 – 6th place
- (Philippines) 2021 – Cancelled due to COVID-19 pandemic
- (Thailand) 2023 – 9th place
- (China) 2026 – 8th place

=== Asian Cup ===
- (Thailand) 2008 – 6th place
- (China) 2010 – 6th place
- (Kazakhstan) 2012 – 7th place
- (China) 2014 – 6th place
- (Vietnam) 2016 – 5th place
- (Thailand) 2018 – 4th place
- (Philippines) 2022 – 5th place

=== AVC Cup ===
- (Thailand) 2022 – Did not participate
- (Indonesia) 2023 – 3rd place
- (Philippines) 2024 – 9th place
- (Vietnam) 2025 – 3rd place
- (Philippines) 2026 – Runners-up

== Current squad ==
As of May 2023 Asian Women's Volleyball Championship

- Coach: Lin Ming-Hui TWN

Shirt No	Player	Birth Date	Height	Club	Position
5.	Chen Yi-Ju	21.12.1989	174 / 64	(Taiwan) NTNU	Middle Blocker
6.	Hsieh Chian-Yi	25.09.1990	165 / 58	Taiwan Power	Setter
7.	Chen Wan-Ting	25.11.1990	178 / 65	(Taiwan) NTNU	Opposite
8.	Yang Yi-Chen	04.04.1992	166 / 62	(Taiwan) NTNU	Setter
9.	Chang Chen-Yin (c)	28.03.1991	180 / 66	Taiwan Power	Outside Spiker
11.	Wu Shu-Fen	07.04.1989	175 / 68	Taiwan Power	Middle Blocker
12.	Yang Meng-Hua	15.08.1991	170 / 67	Taiwan Power	Libero
13.	Wan I-Tzu	31.10.1991	175 / 64	Taiwan Power	Middle Blocker
15.	Lee Tzu-Ying	04.07.1994	173 / 68	(Taiwan) NTNU	Outside Spiker
16.	Chen Tzu-Ya	26.08.1997	177 / 64	(Taiwan) NTNU	Outside Spiker
19.	Tseng Wan-Ling	13.05.1996	170 / 65	Taiwan Power	Middle Blocker
20.	Wang Sin-Ting	17.10.1992	177 / 59	Taiwan Power	Outside Spiker

== Head coaches ==
- (Japan) Norimasa Sakakuchi (jp: 坂口 憲政 ), 2009–2012
- (Taiwan) Lin Ming-Hui (ch: 林明輝 ), 2013
- (Italy) Rampazzo Federico, 2013-2014
- (Taiwan) Huang Chih-Nan (ch: 黃枝男 ), 2014
- (Taiwan) Lin Ming-Hui (ch: 林明輝 ), 2015–2019
- (Japan) Koji Tsuzurabara (jp: 黑葛原 浩二 ) 2019–2022
- (Taiwan) Chen Yu-An (ch: 陳裕安 ) 2022–Present

== See also ==
- Chinese Taipei Volleyball Association
- Chinese Taipei men's national volleyball team
