= Eya Laure =

Filipino volleyball player (born 1999)

Personal information
- Full name: Ejiya Cruz Laure
- Nickname: Eya
- Nationality: Filipino
- Born: March 21, 1999 (age 27); Norzagaray, Bulacan, Philippines
- Height: 1.78 m (5 ft 10 in)
- Weight: 77 kg (170 lb)
- Spike: 298 cm (117 in)
- Block: 276 cm (109 in)
- Education: University of Santo Tomas

Volleyball information
- Position: Outside / Opposite Hitter / Setter

Career
Years	Teams
2019	Foton Tornadoes Blue Energy
2021	Rebisco Philippines
2023–2024	Chery Tiggo Crossovers
2026–present	Choco Mucho Flying Titans

National team
2017 (youth), 2019 (senior)	Philippines
Honours
Women's volleyball
Representing Philippines
Asian Nations Cup
Silver medal – second place	2025 Hanoi	Team
Bronze medal – third place	2024 Manila	Team
SEA V.League
Silver medal – second place	2026 Chiang Mai	Team
Bronze medal – third place	2019 Nakhon Ratchasima / Santa Rosa	Team
Bronze medal – third place	2024 Vĩnh Phúc / Nakhon Ratchasima	Team
Bronze medal – third place	2025 Nakhon Ratchasima / Ninh Bình	Team
Representing Philippines
ASEAN School Games
Bronze medal – third place	2017 Singapore	Team

Ejiya "Eya" Cruz Laure (born March 21, 1999) is a Filipino volleyball player for the Choco Mucho Flying Titans of the Premier Volleyball League (PVL). She is a former team captain of UST Golden Tigresses volleyball team in the UAAP and previously played for Chery Tiggo Crossovers in the Premier Volleyball League. She is a member of the Philippines women's national volleyball team.

== Personal life ==
Laure is from a family of athletes. She is the daughter of Eddie Laure, a professional basketball player who earned the titles "The Dominator" and "The Bounty Hunter" in his stint in the PBA, and Jovie Laure. Her older sister, Ennajie Laure, is her teammate in UST Golden Tigresses and Chery Tiggo Crossovers who plays as an outside spiker. Her younger brother, Echo Laure, is a member of the boys' basketball team of NU.

In June 2022, Laure graduated with a bachelor's degree in tourism management. It was reported in August 2022 that she enrolled with a master's degree in business administration majoring in entrepreneurship.

== Volleyball career ==
=== High school career ===
Laure played with UST Junior Tigresses for UAAP Juniors from Season 75-80 where she brought home one gold, four silvers, and one bronze. She received multiple individual awards in this division including the "Season’s Most Valuable Player" for UAAP Season 78 Girls' Volleyball.

=== Collegiate career ===
She then played her rookie year in the Seniors division with UST Tigresses on UAAP Season 81 Women's Volleyball, where they end up with a silver medal. Laure was awarded “Rookie of the Year” and “1st Best Outside Spiker”. She is also the Season's Best Attacker and Rank 2nd for Most Valuable Player behind Sisi Rondina.

Laure returned to play with UST Tigresses on UAAP Season 84 Women's Volleyball and UAAP Season 85 Women's Volleyball after the COVID-19 pandemic, where they finished 4th on both occasions. Laure, although not officially awarded, was the Best Scorer for both Season 84 and Season 85.

She forewent her last playing year in UAAP to play in PVL, a Professional Volleyball League, with Chery Tiggo Crossovers in 2023.

=== Professional career ===
Laure made her Premier Volleyball League (PVL) debut at the 2023 Invitational Conference with Chery Tiggo Crossovers where they placed 8th out of 13 teams. Few months later, they played on 2023 Second All-Filipino Conference where they finished 4th out of 12 teams. Laure was hailed as the "1st Best Outside Spiker", her first ever individual award in a professional league.

In 2024 PNVF Champions League for Women, she bagged a bronze medal with Chery Tiggo Crossovers, her first podium finish since 2019 and on her professional career. She then played on 2024 PVL All-Filipino Conference where they once again finished 4th out of 12 teams. On that same year, she parted ways with Chery Tiggo Crossovers. A non-compete clause reportedly made her unable to sign with another PVL team for a year.

On January 1, 2026, it was announced that Eya would join the Choco Mucho Flying Titans beginning with the 2026 All-Filipino Conference.

== Clubs ==
- (Philippines) Foton Tornadoes Blue Energy (2019)
- Rebisco Philippines (2021)
- (Philippines) Chery Tiggo Crossovers (2023–2024)
- (Philippines) Choco Mucho Flying Titans (2026–present)

== Awards ==
SEA V Cup

- Best Outside Spiker: 2026 SEA Women's V Cup Leg 2

Premier Volleyball League

- 1st Best Outside Spiker: 2023 Second All-Filipino

Philippine Super Liga

- Best Opposite Spiker: 2018 Collegiate Grand Slam

UAAP women's volleyball

- 1st Best Outside Spiker: 2019 (Season 81)
- Rookie of the Year: 2019 (Season 81)

UAAP girls' volleyball

- Most Valuable Player: 2015 (Season 78)
- Best Opposite Spiker (2): 2016 (Season 79), 2017 (Season 80)
- Best Attacker: 2014 (Season 77)
- Best Setter: 2013 (Season 76)
- Rookie of the Year: 2012 (Season 75)

Shakey's Girls Volleyball League

- 2013 Shakey's Girls Volleyball League (NCR) "Best Setter"
- 2014 Shakey's Girls Volleyball League (NCR) "2nd Best Outside Spiker"
- 2015 Toby's Juniors' Volleyball League Season 9 "Most Valuable Player"
- 2015 Toby's Juniors' Volleyball League Season 9 "Mythical Six"
- 2015 Shakey's Girls Volleyball League (NCR) "Best Opposite Spiker"
- 2016 Shakey's Girls Volleyball League (NCR) "Most Valuable Player"
- 2016 Shakey's Girls Volleyball League (NCR) "Best Opposite Spiker"
- 2016 Shakey's Girls Volleyball League (National) "Most Valuable Player"
- 2016 Shakey's Girls Volleyball League (National) "1st Best Outside Spiker"
- 2017 Shakey's Girls Volleyball League (NCR) "Best Opposite Spiker"

=== High school ===
- 2012 UAAP Season 75 Juniors - Bronze medal, with UST Junior Tigresses
- 2013 Shakey's Girls Volleyball League (NCR) - Silver medal, with UST Junior Tigresses
- 2013 UAAP Season 76 Juniors - Champion, with UST Junior Tigresses
- 2014 Shakey's Girls Volleyball League (NCR) - Silver medal, with UST Junior Tigresses
- 2014 UAAP Season 77 Juniors - Silver medal, with UST Junior Tigresses
- 2015 Toby's Juniors' Volleyball League Season 9 - Champion, with UST Junior Tigresses
- 2015 Shakey's Girls Volleyball League (NCR) - Silver medal, with UST Junior Tigresses
- 2015 UAAP Season 78 Juniors - Silver medal, with UST Junior Tigresses
- 2016 Shakey's Girls Volleyball League (NCR) - Champion, with UST Junior Tigresses
- 2016 Shakey's Girls Volleyball League (National) - Champion, with UST Junior Tigresses
- 2016 UAAP Season 79 Juniors - Silver medal, with UST Junior Tigresses
- 2017 Shakey's Girls Volleyball League (NCR) - Bronze medal, with UST Junior Tigresses
- 2017 UAAP Season 80 Juniors - Silver medal, with UST Junior Tigresses

=== Collegiate ===
- 2018 Philippine University Games - Champion, with UST Golden Tigresses
- 2018 Philippine Super Liga Collegiate Grand Slam Conference - Silver medal, with UST Golden Tigresses
- 2019 UAAP Season 81 Seniors - Silver medal, with UST Golden Tigresses
- 2019 Premier Volleyball League Collegiate Conference - Silver medal, with UST Golden Tigresses

=== Club ===
- 2024 PNVF Champions League (Women) – Bronze medal, with Chery Tiggo Crossovers

=== National team ===
Representing Philippines

- 2017 ASEAN School Games Volleyball - Bronze medal, with Philippine Youth Team
- 2019 ASEAN Grand Prix – First Leg - Bronze medal, with Philippine Team
- 2019 ASEAN Grand Prix – Second Leg - Bronze medal, with Philippine Team
- 2024 Asian Women's Volleyball Challenge Cup - Bronze medal, with Philippine Team
- 2024 SEA Women's V.League – First Leg - Bronze medal, with Philippine Team
- 2024 SEA Women's V.League – Second Leg - Bronze medal, with Philippine Team
- 2025 AVC Women's Volleyball Nations Cup - Silver medal, with Philippine Team
- 2025 SEA Women's V.League – First Leg - Bronze medal, with Philippine Team
- 2025 SEA Women's V.League – Second Leg - Bronze medal, with Philippine Team
- 2026 SEA Women's V.League – Second Leg - Silver medal, with Philippine Team
