= Lê Thị Yến =

Vietnamese volleyball player (born 1997)

Personal information
- Full name: Lê Thị Yến
- Nationality: Vietnam
- Born: September 15, 1997 (age 29) Phù Ninh, Phú Thọ, Vietnam
- Height: 1.68 m (5 ft 6 in)
- Weight: 54 kg (119 lb)
- Spike: 284 cm (9 ft 4 in)
- Block: 271 cm (8 ft 11 in)

Volleyball information
- Position: Libero
- Current club: (Vietnam) Đức Giang Chemical
- Number: 18 (National team and club)

Career
- Years: Team
- 2013–2024: (Vietnam) Than Quảng Ninh VC
- 2024–present: (Vietnam) Đức Giang Chemical

National team
- Years: Team
- 2019, 2024–present 2019: Vietnam; Vietnam U23
Honours
Women's volleyball
Representing Vietnam
Challenger Cup
Bronze medal – third place	2024 Manila	Team
AVC Cup
Gold medal – first place	2024 Manila	Team
Bronze medal – third place	2026 Candon	Team
Southeast Asian Games
Silver medal – second place	2019 Pasig	Team
Silver medal – second place	2025 Bangkok	Team
SEA V Cup
Silver medal – second place	2024 Vĩnh Phúc / Nakhon Ratchasima	Team
Representing Vietnam U23
Asian Championship
Bronze medal – third place	2019 Hanoi	Team

Lê Thị Yến (born September 15, 1997) is a Vietnamese volleyball player. She is a member of Vietnam women's national volleyball team and Đức Giang Chemical volleyball club.

== Clubs ==
- (Vietnam) Than Quảng Ninh VC (2013 – 2024)
- (Vietnam) Đức Giang Chemical (2024 – )

== Career ==
=== National teams ===
==== Senior team ====
- 2019 ASEAN Grand Prix — 4th Place
- 2019 SEA Games — Silver Medal
- 2024 Asian Challenge Cup — Champion
- 2024 FIVB Challenger Cup — 3rd Place
- 2024 SEA V.League — Runner-up
- 2025 SEA Games — Silver Medal
- 2026 AVC Cup — 3rd Place
- 2026 SEA V Cup – Second Leg — 4th Place
- 2026 Asian Championship — 7th Place
- 2026 Asian Games — 7th Place

==== U23 team ====
- 2019 Asian Peace Cup — Champion
- 2019 Asian Championship — 3rd Place

=== Clubs ===
- 2021 Vietnam League – 3rd Place, with Than Quảng Ninh VC
