= Indonesia women's national volleyball team =

National sports team

Indonesia
- Association: Indonesian Volleyball Federation (PBVSI)
- Confederation: AVC
- Head coach: Marcos Sugiyama
- FIVB ranking: 73 ▼3 (24 May 2026)

Uniforms
Home	Away	Third

World Championship
- Appearances: 1 (First in 1982)
- Best result: 21st (1982)

Asian Championship
- Appearances: 11 (First in 1979)
- Best result: 5th (1979, 2026)
- pbvsi.or.id
Honours
Asian Games
Bronze medal – third place	1962 Jakarta	Team
AVC Cup
Silver medal – second place	2023 Gresik	Team
SEA V Cup
Silver medal – second place	2019 Nakhon Ratchasima and Santa Rosa	Team
Bronze medal – third place	2022 Nakhon Ratchasima	Team
Bronze medal – third place	2023 Vĩnh Phúc and Chiang Mai	Team
Bronze medal – third place	2026 Hanoi and Chiang Mai	Team
SEA Games
Gold medal – first place	1983 Singapore	Team
Silver medal – second place	1977 Kuala Lumpur	Team
Silver medal – second place	1979 Jakarta	Team
Silver medal – second place	1981 Manila	Team
Silver medal – second place	1987 Jakarta	Team
Silver medal – second place	1989 Kuala Lumpur	Team
Silver medal – second place	1991 Manila	Team
Silver medal – second place	2017 Kuala Lumpur	Team
Bronze medal – third place	1985 Bangkok	Team
Bronze medal – third place	1993 Singapore	Team
Bronze medal – third place	2007 Nakhon Ratchasima	Team
Bronze medal – third place	2009 Vientiane	Team
Bronze medal – third place	2011 Jakarta and Palembang	Team
Bronze medal – third place	2013 Naypyidaw	Team
Bronze medal – third place	2015 Singapore	Team
Bronze medal – third place	2019 Philippines	Team
Bronze medal – third place	2021 Hanoi	Team
Bronze medal – third place	2023 Phnom Penh	Team
Bronze medal – third place	2025 Bangkok and Chonburi	Team

The Indonesia women's national volleyball team represents Indonesia in international women's volleyball competitions and friendly matches.

It appeared at the Asian Women's Volleyball Championship 22 times, its best position was 5th place at the 1979 and 2026 event.

== Competitive record ==
=== World Championship ===
- (Peru) 1982 — 21st place

=== Asian Championship ===
Asian Championship record
Year	Round	Position	Pld	W	L	SW	SL
(Australia) 1975	Did not participate						
(Hong Kong) 1979	Round Robin	5th Place	6	2	4	6	13
(Japan) 1983	Round Robin	6th Place	–	–	–	–	–
(China) 1987	Round Robin	6th Place	7	3	4	–	–
(Hong Kong) 1989	Round Robin	9th Place	5	1	4	4	12
(Thailand) 1991	Round Robin	9th Place	–	–	–	–	–
(China) 1993	Round Robin	8th Place	6	1	5	–	–
(Thailand) 1995	Did not participate						
(Philippines) 1997	Did not participate						
(Hong Kong) 1999	Did not participate						
(Thailand) 2001	Did not participate						
(Vietnam) 2003	Did not participate						
(China) 2005	Did not participate						
(Thailand) 2007	Round Robin	9th Place	8	6	2	18	6
(Vietnam) 2009	Round Robin	13th Place	6	1	5	9	16
(Taiwan) 2011	Round Robin	13th Place	5	1	4	5	12
(Thailand) 2013	9th–12th places	10th Place	8	4	4	14	14
(China) 2015	Did not participate						
(Philippines) 2017	Did not participate						
(South Korea) 2019	5th–8th places	8th Place	4	1	5	6	13
(Philippines) 2021	Cancelled						
(Thailand) 2023	Did not participate						
(China) 2026	Quarterfinals	5th place	4	2	2	7	6
Total	0 Titles	12/23					

=== Asian Games ===
- (Indonesia) 1962 – Bronze Medal
- (Thailand) 1966 – Did not participate
- (Thailand) 1970 – 7th place
- (Iran) 1974 – Did not participate
- (Thailand) 1978 – Did not participate
- (India) 1982 – Did not participate
- (South Korea) 1986 – 5th place
- (China) 1990 – Did not participate
- (Japan) 1994 – Did not participate
- (Thailand) 1998 – Did not participate
- (South Korea) 2002 – Did not participate
- (Qatar) 2006 – Did not participate
- (China) 2010 – Did not participate
- (South Korea) 2014 – Did not participate
- (Indonesia) 2018 – 7th place
- (China) 2022 – Did not participate
- (Japan) 2026 – 6th place

=== AVC Cup ===
AVC Cup record
Year	Round	Position	Pld	W	L	SW	SL
(Thailand) 2022	Did not participate						
(Indonesia) 2023	Final	Runners-up	6	5	1	17	5
(Philippines) 2024	7th place match	7th place	6	2	4	8	12
(Vietnam) 2025	5th place match	5th place	7	4	3	15	11
(Philippines) 2026	5th place match	5th place	6	4	2	14	7
Total	0 Titles	4/5	25	15	10	54	35

=== Asian Cup ===
- (Thailand) 2008 – Did not qualify
- (China) 2010 – Did not qualify
- (Kazakhstan) 2012 – Did not qualify
- (China) 2014 – Did not qualify
- (Vietnam) 2016 – Did not qualify
- (Thailand) 2018 – Did not qualify
- (Philippines) 2022 – Qualified but withdrew

=== SEA Games ===
- (Malaysia) 1977 — Silver Medal
- (Indonesia) 1979 — Silver Medal
- (Philippines) 1981 — Silver Medal
- (Singapore) 1983 — Gold Medal
- (Thailand) 1985 — Bronze Medal
- (Indonesia) 1987 — Silver Medal
- (Malaysia) 1989 — Silver Medal
- (Philippines) 1991 — Silver Medal
- (Singapore) 1993 — Bronze Medal
- (Thailand) 1995 — 4th place
- (Indonesia) 1997 — 4th place
- (Malaysia) 2001 — 4th place
- (Vietnam) 2003 — 4th place
- (Philippines) 2005 — 4th place
- (Thailand) 2007 — Bronze Medal
- (Laos) 2009 — Bronze Medal
- (Indonesia) 2011 — Bronze Medal
- (Myanmar) 2013 — Bronze Medal
- (Singapore) 2015 — Bronze Medal
- (Malaysia) 2017 — Silver Medal
- (Philippines) 2019 — Bronze Medal
- (Vietnam) 2021 — Bronze Medal
- (Cambodia) 2023 — Bronze Medal
- (Thailand) 2025 — Bronze Medal

=== SEA V Cup ===
- (Thailand) (Philippines) 2019 (Leg 1) Runners-up (Leg 2) Runners-up
- (Thailand) 2022 — 3rd Place
- (Vietnam) (Thailand) 2023 — (Leg 1) 3rd Place (Leg 2) 3rd Place
- (Vietnam) (Thailand) 2024 — (Leg 1) 4th Place (Leg 2) 4th Place
- (Thailand) (Vietnam) 2025 — (Leg 1) 4th Place (Leg 2) 4th Place
- (Vietnam) (Thailand) 2026 — (Leg 1) 3rd Place (Leg 2) 3rd Place

== Team ==
=== Current roster ===
The following is the Indonesia roster in the 2026 AVC Cup.

Head coach: (Japan) Marcos Sugiyama

No.	Pos.	Name	Date of birth	Height	Spike	Block	2026 club
1	L	Fajriahni Ema Herawati	3 February 1997	172 cm (5 ft 8 in)	275 cm (9 ft 0 in)	270 cm (8 ft 10 in)	(Indonesia) Jakarta Popsivo Polwan
2	MB	Maradanti Namira Tegariani	1 May 2006	180 cm (5 ft 11 in)	315 cm (10 ft 4 in)	305 cm (10 ft 0 in)	(Indonesia) Yuso Yogyakarta
3	OH	Tina Syifa Sabila Salim	15 July 2009	174 cm (5 ft 9 in)	295 cm (9 ft 8 in)	290 cm (9 ft 6 in)	(Indonesia) Rajawali 02C
4	MB	Chelsa Berliana Nurtomo	24 June 2007	187 cm (6 ft 2 in)	277 cm (9 ft 1 in)	265 cm (8 ft 8 in)	(Indonesia) Bharata Muda
5	OH	Mediol Stiovanny Yoku	1 September 1999	169 cm (5 ft 7 in)	285 cm (9 ft 4 in)	270 cm (8 ft 10 in)	Gresik Petrokimia Pupuk Indonesia
8	OH	Putri Nur Hidayanti Agustin	17 August 2004	179 cm (5 ft 10 in)	284 cm (9 ft 4 in)	275 cm (9 ft 0 in)	Gresik Petrokimia Pupuk Indonesia
9	OP	Arsela Nuari Purnama	21 January 1997	178 cm (5 ft 10 in)	270 cm (8 ft 10 in)	265 cm (8 ft 8 in)	(Indonesia) Jakarta Popsivo Polwan
10	L	Indah Guretno Dwi Margiani	2 March 2005	165 cm (5 ft 5 in)	289 cm (9 ft 6 in)	267 cm (8 ft 9 in)	(Indonesia) Surabaya Bank Jatim
11	OH	Ersandrina Devega	16 December 1999	170 cm (5 ft 7 in)	270 cm (8 ft 10 in)	263 cm (8 ft 8 in)	(Indonesia) Jakarta TNI AU
15	MB	Geofanny Eka Cahyaningtyas	7 May 2005	175 cm (5 ft 9 in)	283 cm (9 ft 3 in)	275 cm (9 ft 0 in)	Gresik Petrokimia Pupuk Indonesia
19	S	Tisya Amallya Putri (C)	11 October 2000	167 cm (5 ft 6 in)	265 cm (8 ft 8 in)	255 cm (8 ft 4 in)	(Indonesia) Jakarta TNI AL
21	OH	Azzahra Dwi Febyane	1 February 2007	180 cm (5 ft 11 in)	295 cm (9 ft 8 in)	290 cm (9 ft 6 in)	(Indonesia) Bharata Muda
24	S	Arneta Putri Amelian	2 May 2002	173 cm (5 ft 8 in)	300 cm (9 ft 10 in)	290 cm (9 ft 6 in)	(Indonesia) Surabaya Bank Jatim
51	OH	Syelomitha Avrilaviza Wongkar	11 April 2008	180 cm (5 ft 11 in)	290 cm (9 ft 6 in)	270 cm (8 ft 10 in)	(Indonesia) Rajawali 02C

=== Coaching staff ===
As of June 2026

Position	Name
Manager	(Indonesia) Luciana Yvette Taroreh
Head coach	(Japan) Marcos Sugiyama
Assistant coaches	(Indonesia) Pedro Lilipaly
Assistant coaches	(Indonesia) Bobby Ade Setiawan
Physical trainer	(Indonesia) Henny Maspaitella
Analyst	(Indonesia) Bangun Suradesa
Massage specialist	(Indonesia) Indraswari

=== Coaching history ===
Caretaker managers are listed in italics.

- (China) Li Qiujiang (2007)
- (Indonesia) Viktor Laiyan (2009–2012)
- (Indonesia) Risco Herlambang (2017; 2021)
- (Indonesia) Muhammad Ansori (2013–2015; 2018)
- (Indonesia) Alim Suseno (2022–2023)
- (Indonesia) Pedro Lilipaly (2024)
- (Thailand) Chamnan Dokmai (2024)
- (Indonesia) Octavian (2019; 2025)
- (Japan) Marcos Sugiyama (2026–)

== See also ==
- Indonesia men's national volleyball team
- Indonesia women's national under-21 volleyball team
- Indonesia women's national under-19 volleyball team
