= Malaysia women's national volleyball team =

National sports team

Malaysia
- Association: Malaysia Volleyball Federation
- Confederation: AVC
- FIVB ranking: NR (24 May 2026)

Uniforms
Home	Away
Honours
Asian Nations Cup
Bronze medal – third place	2022 Nakhon Pathom	Team
Southeast Asian Games
Bronze medal – third place	1983 Singapore	Team

The Malaysia women's national volleyball team represents Malaysia in international women's volleyball competitions and friendly matches.

They had their best year when they qualified for the 1987 Asian Women's Volleyball Championship.

== Results ==
=== Asian Nations Cup ===
Champions Runners up Third place Fourth place

Asian Nations Cup record
Year	Round	Position	Pld	W	L	SW	SL	Squad
(Thailand) 2022	Round robin	(bronze) 3rd place	4	2	2	6	8	Squad
(Indonesia) 2023	Did not participate							
(Philippines) 2024	Did not participate							
(Vietnam) 2025	Did not participate							
(Philippines) 2026	Did not participate							
Total	0 Titles	1/5	4	2	2	6	8	—

=== SEA Games ===
Champions Runners up Third place Fourth place

SEA Games record
Year	Round	Position	Pld	W	L	SW	SL	Squad
(Malaysia) 1977		?						Squad
(Indonesia) 1979		?						Squad
(Philippines) 1981		?						Squad
(Singapore) 1983	Round robin	Bronze medal						Squad
(Thailand) 1985		?						Squad
(Indonesia) 1987		?						Squad
(Malaysia) 1989		?						Squad
(Philippines) 1991		?						Squad
(Singapore) 1993		?						Squad
(Thailand) 1995		?						Squad
(Indonesia) 1997		?						Squad
(Brunei) 1999	Not held							
(Malaysia) 2001	Classification round	5th place	3	1	2	6	6	Squad
(Vietnam) 2003	Preliminary round	6th place	5	0	5	3	15	Squad
(Myanmar) 2013	Preliminary round	5th place	4	0	4	0	12	Squad
(Singapore) 2015	Preliminary round	7th place	3	0	3	0	9	Squad
(Malaysia) 2017	Preliminary round	5th place	2	0	2	0	6	Squad
(Vietnam) 2021	Preliminary round	5th place	4	0	4	0	12	Squad
(Cambodia) 2023	Classification round	6th place	5	2	3	8	9	Squad
(Thailand) 2025	Classification round	6th place	4	1	3	4	10	Squad
Total	0 Titles		30	4	26	21	79	—

== See also ==
- Malaysia men's national volleyball team
