= Dell Palomata =

Filipino volleyball player

Personal information
- Full name: Dell Juanico Palomata
- Nationality: Filipino
- Born: November 1, 1995 (age 30); Batan, Aklan, Philippines
- Height: 1.90 m (6 ft 3 in)
- Spike: 317 cm (125 in)
- Block: 301 cm (119 in)

Volleyball information
- Position: Middle Blocker
- Current team: PLDT High Speed Hitters

Career
| Years | Teams |
|---|---|
| 2016–2019 | Philippine Air Force |
| 2018 | → Pocari Sweat–Air Force |
| 2021–2022 | Sta. Lucia Lady Realtors |
| 2021 | → Choco Mucho (AVC) |
| 2022–2025 | PLDT High Speed Hitters |
| 2025–2026 | Yogya Falcons |
| 2026–present | PLDT High Speed Hitters |

National team
| 2022–2025 | Philippines |
Honours
Women's volleyball
Representing Philippines
Asian Nations Cup
| Silver medal – second place | 2025 Hanoi | Team |
| Bronze medal – third place | 2024 Manila | Team |
SEA V.League
| Bronze medal – third place | 2024 Vĩnh Phúc | Leg 1 |
| Bronze medal – third place | 2024 Nakhon Ratchasima | Leg 2 |

Dell Juanico Palomata is a Filipino professional volleyball player who plays for the PLDT High Speed Hitters of the Premier Volleyball League.

== Early life and education ==
Dell Juanico Palomata was born on November 1, 1995 in Batan, Aklan. She studied at the University of St. La Salle Bacolod (USLS).

== Career ==
=== Club ===
==== Philippine Air Force ====
Palomata joined the Philippine Air Force women's volleyball team in 2016 when the team lost to the Pocari Sweat Lady Warriors in the Shakey's V-League Open Conference final. Not yet an enlisted Air Force personnel, she played as a guest player. She also had academic commitments with USLS which limited her playing time.

Air Force joined the Premier Volleyball League in 2017. However Palomata skipped the 2017 Reinforced Conference due to having to attend basic military training. She then debuted at the Open Conference.

In 2018, Air Force merged with Pocari Sweat for the 2018 PVL season absorbing Palomata alongside other Air Force players.

Air Force returned as a separate team in the 2019 Open Conference. Palomata is part of the team.

==== Sta. Lucia ====
She was signed by the Sta. Lucia Lady Realtors in April 2021 after seeking permission from Air Force.

==== PLDT ====
After Sta. Lucia took a leave of absence from the PVL due to the COVID-19 pandemic, Palomata joined PVL team, PLDT High Speed Hitters in January 2022.

She was part of the PLDT team which played at the 2025 AVC Women's Volleyball Champions League.

==== Medan Falcons ====
In November 2025, Palomata signed with the Medan Falcons of the Indonesian Proliga ahead of the 2026 season.

=== National team ===
Palomata received her first call up to the Philippine national team when she accepted the Philippine National Volleyball Federation invitation for a place in tryouts in April 2021. She was part of the national team which played under the club name Choco Mucho at the 2021 Asian Women's Club Volleyball Championship

Palomata played at the 2021 SEA Games in Vietnam which was postponed to 2022. She took part at the 2024 AVC Women's Challenge Cup and both legs of the 2024 SEA Women's V.League. The Philippines finished as silver medalists at the 2025 AVC Women's Volleyball Nations Cup. Palomata was named as the tournament's Best Middle Blocker.

== Personal life ==
Palomata is an enlisted personnel of the Philippine Air Force and has the rank of Airwoman First Class as of 2021. She has an extra finger which she disclosed on PLDT's official Instagram page in 2023.
