= Ersandrina Devega =

Indonesian volleyball player (born 1999)

Personal information
- Full name: Ersandrina Devega Salsabila
- Nickname: Caca
- Nationality: Indonesian
- Born: 16 December 1999 (age 26)
- Hometown: Surakarta

Volleyball information
- Position: Opposite hitter

National team
Indonesia
Honours
Women's volleyball
Representing Indonesia
SEA Games
Bronze medal – third place	2025 Bangkok	Team

Ersandrina Devega Salsabila is an Indonesian volleyball player.

== Early life ==
Hailing from Surakarta, Ersandrina Devega Salsabila was born on 16 December 1999. She is also known as Caca.

== Career ==
=== Club ===
Devega was previously part of the amateur club, Vita Solo. She plays as an opposite hitter. From 2022 to 2025, she have played for Jakarta TNI AU, Bandung BJB Tandamata, and Jakarta Electric PLN.

=== National team ===
Devega is part of the Indonesia national team. She was the top scorer at the 2025 AVC Women's Volleyball Nations Cup scoring 126 points by the end of the tournament.
