= 2021 Asian Women's Volleyball Championship =

International indoor volleyball tournament

2021 Asian Women's Championship
Tournament details
- Host country: Philippines
- Dates: 29 August – 5 September 2021 (original schedule)
- Teams: 7
- Venues: 3 (in 3 host cities)

The 2021 Asian Women's Volleyball Championship would have been the 21st edition of the Asian Women's Volleyball Championship, organized by Asia's governing volleyball body, the Asian Volleyball Confederation (AVC) hosted in the Philippines.

Originally scheduled for August 29 to September 5, 2021, the tournament was postponed to 2022 due rising COVID-19 cases amidst a pandemic before it was eventually canceled.

== Host selection ==
During the AVC Sports Events Council Meeting in Bangkok, Thailand, the Asian Volleyball Confederation announced on February 11, 2020, that only one national federation have applied to organize 2021 Asian Women's Championship:

However, China later withdrew as host. The Philippines was named as replacement hosts on May 15, 2021. The main venue will be Bren Z. Guiao Convention Center in San Fernando, Pampanga, while the Subic Gymnasium in Olongapo (Subic) and the AUF Sports and Cultural Center in Angeles City (Clark) will be the secondary venues.

- China (Chinese Volleyball Association; withdrew)
- Philippines (Philippine National Volleyball Federation; replacement hosts)

The Philippine government's Inter-Agency Task Force for the Management of Emerging Infectious Diseases (IATF-EID), which deals with the country's response against the COVID-19 pandemic, approved the hosting of the tournament on July 16, 2021.

== Qualification ==
Following the AVC regulations, The maximum of 16 teams in all AVC events will be selected by

- 1 team for the host country
- 10 teams based on the final standing of the previous edition
- 5 teams from each of 5 zones (with a qualification tournament if needed)

=== Qualified teams ===
The AVC stated that there were originally twelve entrant teams that were due to participate in the tournament.

Event(s)		Dates	Location	Berths	Qualifier(s)
Host nation		15 May 2021	(Thailand) Bangkok	1	Philippines
2019 Asian Championship		18 – 25 August 2019	(South Korea) Seoul	5	~~Japan~~^{A} Thailand; ~~South Korea~~^{C} ~~China~~^{A} Kazakhstan; Chinese Taipei; Iran; ~~Indonesia~~^{A} Australia; ~~India~~^{B}
Direct zonal wildcards	Central Asia	No later than 2 February 2021	(Thailand) Bangkok	1	~~Nepal~~^{B} Uzbekistan
Total				7	

^A China, Indonesia, and Japan originally qualified as one of the top ten finishing teams in the 2019 edition, but these teams withdrew. These spots were reallocated to zonal entrants.
^B India and Nepal were barred by the AVC from participating due to the surge of a new COVID-19 variant in the region.
^C The Korea Volleyball Association decided to withdraw the South Korea women's national volleyball team in the 2021 Asian Women's Volleyball Championship. They said it would be difficult for the team to convene, train, and dispatch due to COVID-19.

== Venue ==
Three venues spanning three cities in the Clark and Subic areas in the Philippines will be used for the 2021 Asian Women's Volleyball Championship.

San Fernando, Pampanga	Olongapo	Angeles City
Bren Z. Guiao Convention Center	Subic Gymnasium	AUF Sports and Cultural Center
Capacity: 3,000	Capacity: 2,000	Capacity: 2,000

== Pools composition ==
Teams were seeded in the first two positions of each pool following the Serpentine system according to their previous edition. AVC reserved the right to seed the hosts as heads of pool A regardless of the previous ranking. All teams not seeded were drawn to take other available positions in the remaining lines. Each pool had no more than three teams from the same zonal association. The draw was held in Bangkok, Thailand on July 16, 2021.

Ranking from the 2019 Asian Women's Volleyball Championship was shown in brackets except the host and the teams who did not participate, which were denoted by (–).

Pots

Seeded Teams	Pot 1	Pot 2
Philippines (Host); Thailand (2); Kazakhstan (5)	Chinese Taipei (6); Iran (7)	Australia (9); Uzbekistan (–)

After the draw

Pool A	Pool B
Philippines	Thailand
Kazakhstan	Iran
Chinese Taipei	Australia
Uzbekistan

== See also ==
- 2021 Asian Men's Volleyball Championship
- 2021 Asian Women's Club Volleyball Championship

== Notes ==
^note Pampanga, Subic, Clark all of which are not cities are officially listed as hosts. Venues used for the tournament are in:

- San Fernando in Pampanga province
- Olongapo in the Subic Freeport Zone
- Angeles City which is in Metro Clark
