= 2025 AVC Women's Volleyball Nations Cup =

Asian women's volleyball tournament

- Official logo

Tournament details
- Host country: Vietnam
- City: Hanoi
- Dates: 7–14 June
- Teams: 11 (from 1 confederation)
- Venue: 1 (in 1 host city)

Final positions
- Champions: Vietnam (3rd title)
- Runners-up: Philippines
- Third place: Chinese Taipei
- Fourth place: Kazakhstan

Tournament awards
- MVP: (Vietnam) Nguyễn Thị Bích Tuyền
- Best Setter: (Philippines) Jia de Guzman
- Best OH: (Philippines) Angel Canino; (Vietnam) Trần Thị Thanh Thúy
- Best MB: (Chinese Taipei) Kan Ko-hui; (Philippines) Dell Palomata
- Best OPP: (Vietnam) Nguyễn Thị Bích Tuyền
- Best Libero: (Vietnam) Nguyễn Khánh Đang

Tournament statistics
- Matches played: 35
- Attendance: 42,850 (1,224 per match)

The 2025 AVC Women's Volleyball Nations Cup was the first and final edition under this name, and the fourth overall edition of the tournament formerly known as the AVC Women's Challenge Cup, an annual international volleyball tournament organized by the Asian Volleyball Confederation (AVC) with Volleyball Federation of Vietnam (VFV). It was held from 7 to 14 June 2025 in Hanoi, Vietnam.

As the FIVB Volleyball Nations League restructured its format and abolished the Challenger Cup as a direct qualifier to the tournament, this tournament would served to countries currently not participating in the Nations League to garner world ranking points for a chance to enter the said competition. Vietnam, the champions of this tournament qualified for the 2026 Asian Championship.

Host Vietnam won their third consecutive title after defeating the Philippines in the final. Chinese Taipei defeated Kazakhstan in the 3rd place match and took the bronze medal. Nguyễn Thị Bích Tuyền was named as the MVP of the tournament for the second time.

== Host selection ==
Vietnam had submitted its bid to host the tournament and have been approved by AVC on 9 April 2025. AVC has sent an official document to the Volleyball Federation of Vietnam.

== Qualification ==
List of teams: Participating in the 2025 FIVB Nations League Participating in the 2025 AVC Nations Cup Did not enter the tournament Did not participate

Following AVC regulations, a maximum of 12 teams for the next AVC Nations Cup were selected through the following criteria:

- 1 team for the host country
- 6 other top-ranked teams from the previous edition (2024)
- 5 other highest-ranked entrant teams in the FIVB Senior World Rankings
  - If a team does not have world ranking points, the final decision will be made by AVC in consultation with Volleyball World and the host country.

Country	Zone	Qualified as	Qualified on	Previous appearances			Previous best performance
Country	Zone	Qualified as	Qualified on	Total	First	Last	Previous best performance
Vietnam (Note: Vietnam originally qualified on 29 May 2024 as the defending champions. Their spot was allocated to Indonesia after being awarded hosting rights on 15 April 2025.)	SAVA	Host country	15 April 2025	2	2023	2024	Champions (2023, 2024)
Kazakhstan	CAVA	2024 Challenge Cup runners-up	29 May 2024	1	2024		Runners-up (2024)
Philippines	SAVA	2024 Challenge Cup 3rd placers	29 May 2024	2	2023	2024	3rd place (2024)
Australia	OZVA	2024 Challenge Cup 4th placers	29 May 2024	2	2023	2024	4th place (2024)
India	CAVA	2024 Challenge Cup 5th placers	29 May 2024	3	2022	2024	Runners-up (2022)
Iran	CAVA	2024 Challenge Cup 6th placers	29 May 2024	2	2023	2024	5th place (2023)
Indonesia	SAVA	2024 Challenge Cup 7th placers	15 April 2025	2	2023	2024	Runners-up (2023)
Chinese Taipei	EAVA	1st World ranked non-qualified team	15 April 2025	2	2023	2024	3rd place (2023)
~~Singapore~~ (Note: Singapore originally qualified for the tournament. However, they did not sent an intent to participate.)	~~SAVA~~	~~2nd World ranked non-qualified team~~	~~15 April 2025~~	~~2~~	~~2022~~	~~2024~~	~~5th place (2022)~~
Hong Kong	EAVA	3rd World ranked non-qualified team	15 April 2025	3	2022	2024	Champions (2022)
Mongolia	EAVA	Additional entrant teams	6 May 2025	1	2023		10th place (2023)
New Zealand	OZVA	Additional entrant teams	6 May 2025	0	None		Debut
~~Qatar~~ (Note: Although the submission deadline for countries wanting to join the tournament has passed, AVC invited Qatar to complete the 12-team competition. However, the team declined to join.)	~~WAVA~~	Additional entrant teams	—N/a	~~0~~	~~None~~		~~None~~

China, Japan, South Korea, and Thailand which are part of the 2025 FIVB Women's Volleyball Nations League are ineligible to submit entries to this tournament.

== Pools composition ==
The draw of lots took place on 25 May 2025 at the Edsa Shangri-La, Manila in Mandaluyong, Philippines. Unlike in the men's tournament, the teams were divided into two pools due to not reaching the maximum participation limit of 12 teams.

Teams were seeded following the serpentine system according to their standings in the previous edition. Rankings are shown in brackets except the hosts who ranked 1st.

Pool A	Pool B
Vietnam (Hosts)	Kazakhstan (2)
Australia (4)	Philippines (3)
India (5)	Iran (6)
Hong Kong (8)	Indonesia (7)
Chinese Taipei (9)	Mongolia (–)
—N/a	New Zealand (–)

== Venue ==
Hanoi, Vietnam
Đông Anh Gymnasium
Capacity: 2,650

== Pool standing procedure ==
1. Total number of victories (matches won, matches lost)
2. In the event of a tie, the following first tiebreaker will apply: The teams will be ranked by the most point gained per match as follows:
  - Match won 3–0 or 3–1: 3 points for the winner, 0 points for the loser
  - Match won 3–2: 2 points for the winner, 1 point for the loser
  - Match forfeited: 3 points for the winner, 0 points (0–25, 0–25, 0–25) for the loser
3. If teams are still tied after examining the number of victories and points gained, then the AVC will examine the results in order to break the tie in the following order:
  - Set quotient: if two or more teams are tied on the number of points gained, they will be ranked by the quotient resulting from the division of the number of all set won by the number of all sets lost.
  - Points quotient: if the tie persists based on the set quotient, the teams will be ranked by the quotient resulting from the division of all points scored by the total of points lost during all sets.
  - If the tie persists based on the point quotient, the tie will be broken based on the team that won the match of the Round Robin Phase between the tied teams. When the tie in point quotient is between three or more teams, these teams ranked taking into consideration only the matches involving the teams in question.

== Preliminary round ==
- All times are Indochina Time (UTC+07:00).

=== Pool A ===
Pos	Team	Pld	W	L	Pts	SW	SL	SR	SPW	SPL	SPR	Qualification
1	Vietnam (H)	4	4	0	12	12	0	MAX	300	163	1.840	Semifinals
2	Chinese Taipei	4	3	1	9	9	4	2.250	297	238	1.248	Semifinals
3	Hong Kong	4	2	2	4	6	10	0.600	287	355	0.808	5th–8th semifinals
4	Australia	4	1	3	4	5	10	0.500	283	339	0.835	5th–8th semifinals
5	India	4	0	4	1	4	12	0.333	301	373	0.807	9th–11th semifinals

Source: FIVB Live Center
(H) Host

Date	Time		Score		Set 1	Set 2	Set 3	Set 4	Set 5	Total	Report
7 Jun	12:30	Australia	0–3	Chinese Taipei	18–25	9–25	20–25			47–75	P2 Report
7 Jun	20:00	Vietnam	3–0	Hong Kong	25–16	25–13	25–10			75–39	P2 Report
8 Jun	17:30	India	2–3	Hong Kong	25–22	25–18	15–25	21–25	16–18	102–108	P2 Report
8 Jun	20:00	Vietnam	3–0	Chinese Taipei	25–17	25–16	25–17			75–50	P2 Report
9 Jun	12:30	Australia	3–1	India	18–25	25–20	25–19	25–23		93–87	P2 Report
9 Jun	17:30	Chinese Taipei	3–0	Hong Kong	25–10	25–8	25–20			75–38	P2 Report
11 Jun	10:00	Australia	2–3	Hong Kong	20–25	19–25	25–18	25–18	14–16	103–102	P2 Report
11 Jun	20:00	Vietnam	3–0	India	25–19	25–7	25–8			75–34	P2 Report
12 Jun	17:30	India	1–3	Chinese Taipei	16–25	20–25	25–22	17–25		78–97	P2 Report
12 Jun	20:00	Vietnam	3–0	Australia	25–11	25–14	25–15			75–40	P2 Report

=== Pool B ===
Pos	Team	Pld	W	L	Pts	SW	SL	SR	SPW	SPL	SPR	Qualification
1	Philippines	5	4	1	13	14	4	3.500	433	351	1.234	Semifinals
2	Kazakhstan	5	4	1	12	12	5	2.400	403	335	1.203	Semifinals
3	Iran	5	3	2	8	12	11	1.091	488	481	1.015	5th–8th semifinals
4	Indonesia	5	2	3	7	9	9	1.000	394	390	1.010	5th–8th semifinals
5	Mongolia	5	1	4	3	6	14	0.429	388	444	0.874	9th place match
6	New Zealand	5	1	4	2	4	14	0.286	323	428	0.755	9th–11th semifinals

Source: FIVB Live Center

Date	Time		Score		Set 1	Set 2	Set 3	Set 4	Set 5	Total	Report
7 Jun	10:00	Kazakhstan	3–0	New Zealand	25–15	25–23	25–15			75–53	P2 Report
7 Jun	15:00	Philippines	3–0	Mongolia	25–18	25–16	25–14			75–48	P2 Report
7 Jun	17:30	Iran	3–2	Indonesia	23–25	25–23	16–25	25–19	15–12	104–104	P2 Report
8 Jun	10:00	Kazakhstan	3–1	Mongolia	25–14	24–26	25–18	25–15		99–73	P2 Report
8 Jun	12:30	Philippines	3–1	Indonesia	22–25	25–23	25–13	28–26		100–87	P2 Report
8 Jun	15:00	Iran	3–1	New Zealand	23–25	25–16	25–12	25–18		98–71	P2 Report
9 Jun	10:00	Kazakhstan	3–0	Indonesia	25–17	25–12	26–24			76–53	P2 Report
9 Jun	15:00	Philippines	2–3	Iran	25–16	21–25	26–24	23–25	13–15	108–105	P2 Report
9 Jun	20:00	Mongolia	2–3	New Zealand	22–25	20–25	25–10	25–20	13–15	105–95	P2 Report
11 Jun	12:30	Kazakhstan	3–1	Iran	25–14	25–18	22–25	26–24		98–81	P2 Report
11 Jun	15:00	Philippines	3–0	New Zealand	25–17	25–21	25–18			75–56	P2 Report
11 Jun	17:30	Indonesia	3–0	Mongolia	25–18	25–21	25–23			75–62	P2 Report
12 Jun	10:00	Kazakhstan	0–3	Philippines	21–25	15–25	19–25			55–75	P2 Report
12 Jun	12:30	Iran	2–3	Mongolia	18–25	25–21	25–14	21–25	11–15	100–100	P2 Report
12 Jun	15:00	Indonesia	3–0	New Zealand	25–14	25–15	25–19			75–48	P2 Report

== Final round ==
- All times are Indochina Time (UTC+07:00).

=== 9th–11th places ===
9th–11th semifinals
13 June
India	3
New Zealand	1

9th place match
14 June
India	3
Mongolia	1

==== 9th–11th semifinals ====
Date	Time		Score		Set 1	Set 2	Set 3	Set 4	Set 5	Total	Report
13 Jun	10:00	India	3–1	New Zealand	25–17	21–25	25–15	25–22		96–79	P2 Report

==== 9th place match ====
Date	Time		Score		Set 1	Set 2	Set 3	Set 4	Set 5	Total	Report
14 Jun	10:00	India	3–1	Mongolia	25–23	21–25	25–18	25–20		96–86	P2 Report

=== 5th–8th places ===
5th–8th semifinals
13 June
Hong Kong	1
Indonesia	3
13 June
Australia	0
Iran	3

5th place match
14 June
Indonesia	3
Iran	1
7th place match
14 June
Hong Kong	2
Australia	3

==== 5th–8th semifinals ====
Date	Time		Score		Set 1	Set 2	Set 3	Set 4	Set 5	Total	Report
13 Jun	12:30	Hong Kong	1–3	Indonesia	21–25	20–25	25–23	15–25		81–98	P2 Report
13 Jun	15:00	Australia	0–3	Iran	19–25	18–25	22–25			59–75	P2 Report

==== 7th place match ====
Date	Time		Score		Set 1	Set 2	Set 3	Set 4	Set 5	Total	Report
14 Jun	12:30	Hong Kong	2–3	Australia	25–18	21–25	25–23	23–25	8–15	102–106	P2 Report

==== 5th place match ====
Date	Time		Score		Set 1	Set 2	Set 3	Set 4	Set 5	Total	Report
14 Jun	15:00	Indonesia	3–1	Iran	25–17	25–15	23–25	25–20		98–77	P2 Report

=== Final four ===
Semifinals
13 June
Vietnam	3
Kazakhstan	1
13 June
Philippines	3
Chinese Taipei	2

Final
14 June
Vietnam	3
Philippines	0
3rd place match
14 June
Kazakhstan	1
Chinese Taipei	3

==== Semifinals ====
Date	Time		Score		Set 1	Set 2	Set 3	Set 4	Set 5	Total	Report
13 Jun	17:30	Vietnam	3–1	Kazakhstan	25–15	19–25	25–7	25–16		94–63	P2 Report
13 Jun	20:00	Philippines	3–2	Chinese Taipei	25–17	25–21	18–25	15–25	15–12	98–100	P2 Report

==== 3rd place match ====
Date	Time		Score		Set 1	Set 2	Set 3	Set 4	Set 5	Total	Report
14 Jun	17:30	Kazakhstan	1–3	Chinese Taipei	25–17	13–25	16–25	13–25		67–92	P2 Report

==== Final ====
Date	Time		Score		Set 1	Set 2	Set 3	Set 4	Set 5	Total	Report
14 Jun	20:00	Vietnam	3–0	Philippines	25–15	25–17	25–14			75–46	P2 Report

== Final standing ==
Rank	Team
1st place, gold medalist(s)	Vietnam
2nd place, silver medalist(s)	Philippines
3rd place, bronze medalist(s)	Chinese Taipei
4	Kazakhstan
5	Indonesia
6	Iran
7	Australia
8	Hong Kong
9	India
10	Mongolia
11	New Zealand

Qualified for the 2026 AVC Continental Championship and the 2026 AVC Cup

2025 Asian Nations Cup champions

Vietnam
Third title

14–woman roster
Trần Thị Thanh Thúy (c), Lưu Thị Ly Ly, Lê Thanh Thúy, Nguyễn Thị Bích Tuyền, Hoàng Thị Kiều Trinh, Nguyễn Khánh Đang, Võ Thị Kim Thoa, Nguyễn Thị Trinh, Vi Thị Như Quỳnh, Nguyễn Thị Phương, Phạm Thị Hiền, Đoàn Thị Lâm Oanh, Nguyễn Thị Uyên, Trần Thị Bích Thủy
Head coach
Nguyễn Tuấn Kiệt

== Awards ==
- Most valuable player
  Nguyễn Thị Bích Tuyền (VIE)
- Best setter
  Jia de Guzman (PHI)
- Best outside spikers
  Angel Canino (PHI)
  Trần Thị Thanh Thúy (VIE)
- Best middle blockers
  Kan Ko-hui (TPE)
  Dell Palomata (PHI)
- Best opposite spiker
  Nguyễn Thị Bích Tuyền (VIE)
- Best libero
  Nguyễn Khánh Đang (VIE)

== Broadcasting rights ==
Country/region	Broadcaster
Global	Volleyball TV, YouTube
Indonesia	Emtek (Vidio, Moji)
Philippines	Cignal (One Sports, Pilipinas Live)
Vietnam	Vietnam Television (VTVCab)
