= Nguyễn Thị Bích Tuyền =

Vietnamese volleyball player (born 2000)

Personal information
- Full name: Nguyễn Thị Bích Tuyền
- Nationality: Vietnam
- Born: 22 May 2000 (age 26); An Giang, Vietnam
- Hometown: Vĩnh Long
- Height: 1.88 m (6 ft 2 in)
- Weight: 75 kg (165 lb)
- Spike: 310 cm (10 ft 2 in)
- Block: 300 cm (9 ft 10 in)

Volleyball information
- Position: Opposite spiker
- Current club: LP Bank Ninh Bình
- Number: 10 (National team and club)

Career
Years	Teams
2016–2020	Vĩnh Long VC
2019	VTV Bình Điền Long An (loan)
2021–present	LP Bank Ninh Bình

National team
2022–present 2017–2018	Vietnam; Vietnam U20
Honours
Women's volleyball
Representing Vietnam
Challenger Cup
Bronze medal – third place	2024 Manila	Team
Asian Nations Cup
Gold medal – first place	2024 Manila	Team
Gold medal – first place	2025 Hanoi	Team
Southeast Asian Games
Silver medal – second place	2021 Vietnam	Team
SEA V.League
Gold medal – first place	2025 Ninh Bình	Team
Silver medal – second place	2024 Vĩnh Phúc / Nakhon Ratchasima	Team
Silver medal – second place	2025 Nakhon Ratchasima	Team

Nguyễn Thị Bích Tuyền (born 22 May 2000) is a Vietnamese volleyball player. She is a member of Vietnam women's national volleyball team and LP Bank Ninh Bình volleyball club.

== Early life ==
Nguyễn Thị Bích Tuyền was born on 22 May 2000 in An Giang, Vietnam but hails from Tân Hòa, Vĩnh Long. She was noted for her height, already 1.73 metres (5.7 ft) tall at age 13.

== Career ==
=== NCAA offer ===
In 2017, Bích Tuyền received an invite to study at the University of Oregon under a scholarship and play for the Oregon Ducks women's volleyball team in the National Collegiate Athletic Association. The offer was declined in part of the Vĩnh Long Volleyball Federation's pressure to retain a local talent.

=== Club ===
==== Vĩnh Long ====
Bích Tuyền joined the Vĩnh Long volleyball team in 2016. She has also played for the team in the VTV Cup, an international club tournament.

In 2019, Bích Tuyền played on loan for VTV Bình Điền Long An in the 2019 VTV9 - Binh Dien Cup.

She announced her resignation from the Vĩnh Long in January 2021. Her departure was unexpected as she has been receiving a salary of 50 million VND per month making her the most paid Vietnamese women's volleyball player at the time.

==== Ninh Bình ====
In February 2021, Bích Tuyền joined LP Bank Ninh Bình. Having kept her hair long since childhood, Bích Tuyền began sporting a short masculine hair.

Bích Tuyền was supposed to play for VTV Bình Điền Long An on loan for the 2025 AVC Women's Volleyball Champions League. However, her governing team LP Bank Ninh Bình did not reach an agreement with VTV Bình Điền Long An to have Bích Tuyền at the tournament.

Her career remains uncertain as the Vietnam Volleyball Federation will introduce stricter sex verification rules starting early 2026.

=== National team ===
Bích Tuyền has played for the Vietnam women's national volleyball team. She would have played as early as the 2019 SEA Games but withdrew officially due to an injury.

However her sex eligibility has been recurringly scrutinized due to her appearance and physique. Thị Bích Tuyền's style of play at the 2021 SEA Games held in May 2022, was characterized as being "like a man" by a Thai journalist writing for the Asian Volleyball Confederation who later apologized to the player.

She has either refused to call ups by the Vietnam national team or withdraw from international tournaments for at least in 2023.

Bích Tuyền returned to the national team in 2024. She helped Vietnam win over Thailand in the final of the 2025 SEA Women's V.League second leg. The match marks Vietnam's first win over Thailand in women's volleyball which she considers as her most memorable moment.

Bích Tuyền withdrew from the 2025 FIVB Women's Volleyball World Championship in protest of the FIVB's alleged lack of transparency on eligibility rules. This was after Vietnam was penalized for "using ineligible players" at the 2025 FIVB Volleyball Women's U21 World Championship.

== Clubs ==
- (Vietnam) Vĩnh Long VC (2016 – 2020)
- (Vietnam) VTV Bình Điền Long An (2019) (loan)
- (Vietnam) LP Bank Ninh Bình (2021 – present)

== Achievements ==
=== National teams ===
==== Senior team ====
- 2021 SEA Games — Silver Medal
- 2024 Asian Challenge Cup — Champion
- 2024 FIVB Challenger Cup — 3rd Place
- 2024 SEA V.League — Runner-up
- 2025 Asian Nations Cup — Champion
- 2025 SEA V.League – First Leg — Runner-up
- 2025 SEA V.League – Second Leg — Champion

==== U20 Team ====
- 2018 Asian Championship — 6th Place

=== Clubs ===
- 2023 Vietnam League – Champion, with LP Bank Ninh Bình
- 2024 Asian Club Championship — Runner-up, with LP Bank Ninh Bình
- 2024 Vietnam League – 3rd Place, with LP Bank Ninh Bình

== Awards ==
- 2021 Vietnam League "Best spiker"
- 2024 VTV9 - Binh Dien International Cup "Best opposite spiker"
- 2024 Asian Challenge Cup "Most valuable player"
- 2024 SEA V.League – First Leg "Best opposite spiker"
- 2024 VTV Cup "Best opposite spiker"
- 2024 Asian Club Championship "Best opposite spiker"
- 2025 Asian Nations Cup "Most valuable player"
- 2025 Asian Nations Cup "Best opposite spiker"
- 2025 VTV Cup "Best opposite spiker"
- 2025 SEA V.League – First Leg "Best opposite spiker"
- 2025 SEA V.League – Second Leg "Most valuable player"
- 2025 SEA V.League – Second Leg "Best opposite spiker"
