= Hong Kong women's national volleyball team =

National sports team

Hong Kong
- Association: Volleyball Association of Hong Kong, China
- Confederation: AVC
- Head coach: Kwok Kin Chuen
- FIVB ranking: 85 ▼4 (24 May 2026)

Uniforms
Home	Away	Third

Asian Championship
- Appearances: 16 (First in 1979)
- Best result: 6th (1979)
- www.vbahk.org.hk
Honours
Asian Nations Cup
Gold medal – first place	2022 Nakhon Pathom	Team

The Hong Kong women's national volleyball team represents Hong Kong in international women's volleyball competitions and friendly matches.

It appeared at the Asian Women's Volleyball Championship 16 times.

The team also participated at the 2016 Women's Volleyball Thai-Denmark Super League.

== Competition records ==
=== Asian Games ===
- (Thailand) 1978 — 6th place
- (South Korea) 2014 — 7th place
- (Indonesia) 2018 — 11th place
- (China) 2022 — 10th place
- (Japan) 2026 —

=== Asian Championship ===
- (Hong Kong) 1979 – 6th place
- (Japan) 1983 – 8th place
- (China) 1987 – 10th place
- (Hong Kong) 1989 – 8th place
- (Thailand) 1991 – 11th place
- (China) 1993 – 12th place
- (Thailand) 1995 – 9th place
- (Philippines) 1997 – 9th place
- (Vietnam) 2009 – 10th place
- (Thailand) 2013 – 13th place
- (China) 2015 – 13th place
- (Philippines) 2017 – 11th place
- (South Korea) 2019 – 11th place
- (Thailand) 2023 – 11th place
- (China) 2026 – 10th place

=== Asian Nations Cup ===
- (Thailand) 2022 — (gold) Champions
- (Indonesia) 2023 — 9th place
- (Philippines) 2024 — 8th place
- (Vietnam) 2025 — 8th place
- (Philippines) 2026 — 9th place
