= 1989 Asian Women's Volleyball Championship =

International indoor volleyball tournament

Tournament details
- Host country: Hong Kong
- City: Hong Kong
- Dates: 30 September – 8 October 1989
- Teams: 10 (from 1 confederation)
- Venue: 1 (in 1 host city)

Final positions
- Champions: China (3rd title)
- Runners-up: South Korea
- Third place: Japan
- Fourth place: Chinese Taipei

The 1989 Asian Women's Volleyball Championship was the fifth edition of the Asian Championship, a biennial international volleyball tournament organised by the Asian Volleyball Confederation (AVC) with Volleyball Association of Hong Kong, China (VBAHK). The tournament was held in British Hong Kong from 30 September to 8 October 1989.

== Preliminary round ==
=== Pool A ===
Pos	Team	Pld	W	L	Pts	SW	SL	SR	SPW	SPL	SPR	Qualification
1	South Korea	4	4	0	8	12	0	MAX	0	0	—	Championship round
2	Chinese Taipei	4	3	1	7	0	0	—	0	0	—	Championship round
3	Thailand	4	2	2	6	0	0	—	0	0	—	5th–8th classification
4	Hong Kong	4	1	3	5	0	0	—	0	0	—	5th–8th classification
5	Macau	4	0	4	4	0	0	—	0	0	—	9th–10th classification

Date		Score		Set 1	Set 2	Set 3	Set 4	Set 5	Total
	South Korea	3–0	Chinese Taipei	15–3	15–10	15–13			45–26
	Thailand	0–3	South Korea	3–15	4–15	2–15			9–45

=== Pool B ===
Pos	Team	Pld	W	L	Pts	SW	SL	SR	SPW	SPL	SPR	Qualification
1	China	4	4	0	8	0	0	—	0	0	—	Championship round
2	Japan	4	3	1	7	0	0	—	0	0	—	Championship round
3	North Korea	4	2	2	6	0	0	—	0	0	—	5th–8th classification
4	Australia	4	1	3	5	3	10	0.300	0	0	—	5th–8th classification
5	Indonesia	4	0	4	4	1	12	0.083	0	0	—	9th–10th classification

Date		Score		Set 1	Set 2	Set 3	Set 4	Set 5	Total
	Australia	3–1	Indonesia						
	North Korea	3–0	Australia						
	Australia	0–3	Japan						
	China	3–0	Australia						

== Final round ==
=== Classification 9th–10th ===
Date		Score		Set 1	Set 2	Set 3	Set 4	Set 5	Total
	Macau	0–3	Indonesia						

=== Classification 5th–8th ===
5th–8th places
7 October – Hong Kong
Thailand	3
Australia	2
7 October – Hong Kong
North Korea	3
Hong Kong	0

5th place
8 October – Hong Kong
Thailand	?
North Korea	3
7th place
8 October – Hong Kong
Australia	3
Hong Kong	0

Date		Score		Set 1	Set 2	Set 3	Set 4	Set 5	Total
07 Oct	Thailand	3–2	Australia						
07 Oct	North Korea	3–0	Hong Kong						

Date		Score		Set 1	Set 2	Set 3	Set 4	Set 5	Total
08 Oct	Australia	3–0	Hong Kong						
08 Oct	Thailand	?–3	North Korea						

=== Championship ===
Semifinals
7 October – Hong Kong
South Korea	3
Japan	0
7 October – Hong Kong
China	3
Chinese Taipei	?

Final
8 October – Hong Kong
South Korea	0
China	3
3rd place
8 October – Hong Kong
Japan	3
Chinese Taipei	?

Date		Score		Set 1	Set 2	Set 3	Set 4	Set 5	Total
07 Oct	South Korea	3–0	Japan	15–5	15–7	15–8			45–20
07 Oct	China	3–?	Chinese Taipei						

Date		Score		Set 1	Set 2	Set 3	Set 4	Set 5	Total
08 Oct	Japan	3–?	Chinese Taipei						
08 Oct	South Korea	0–3	China	7–15	1–15	10–15			18–45

== Final standing ==
Rank	Team
1st place, gold medalist(s)	China
2nd place, silver medalist(s)	South Korea
3rd place, bronze medalist(s)	Japan
4	Chinese Taipei
5	North Korea
6	Thailand
7	Australia
8	Hong Kong
9	Indonesia
10	Macau

Qualified for the 1989 World Cup
Qualified for the 1990 World Championship

1989 Asian Women's champions

China
3rd title
