= Volleyball at the 1962 Asian Games – Women's tournament =

Women at the 1962 Asian Games
- Venue: Senayan Volleyball Stadium
- Date: 25–27 August 1962
- Nations: 4

Medalists
gold medal	Japan
silver medal	South Korea
bronze medal	Indonesia

This page presents the results of the women's volleyball tournament at the 1962 Asian Games, which was held from 25 to 27 August 1962 in Jakarta, Indonesia.

Japan won the gold medal in a round robin competition.

== Results ==
Pos	Team	Pld	W	L	Pts	SW	SL	SR	SPW	SPL	SPR
1	Japan	3	3	0	6	9	0	MAX	135	41	3.293
2	South Korea	3	2	1	5	6	5	1.200	141	126	1.119
3	Indonesia	3	1	2	4	3	6	0.500	83	117	0.709
4	Philippines	3	0	3	3	2	9	0.222	84	159	0.528

Source: Results

Date		Score		Set 1	Set 2	Set 3	Set 4	Set 5	Total
25 Aug	South Korea	3–2	Philippines	10–15	14–16	15–6	15–2	15–11	69–50
25 Aug	Indonesia	0–3	Japan	3–15	4–15	0–15			7–45
26 Aug	Japan	3–0	South Korea	15–12	15–9	15–6			45–27
26 Aug	Indonesia	3–0	Philippines	15–11	15–8	15–8			45–27
27 Aug	Japan	3–0	Philippines	15–4	15–0	15–3			45–7
27 Aug	Indonesia	0–3	South Korea	11–15	10–15	10–15			31–45

== Final standing ==
Rank	Team	Pld	W	L
1st place, gold medalist(s)	Japan	3	3	0
2nd place, silver medalist(s)	South Korea	3	2	1
3rd place, bronze medalist(s)	Indonesia	3	1	2
4	Philippines	3	0	3
