= 1991 Asian Women's Volleyball Championship =

International indoor volleyball tournament

Tournament details
- Host country: Thailand
- City: Bangkok
- Dates: 14–21 September
- Teams: 14
- Venue: 1 (in 1 host city)

Final positions
- Champions: China (4th title)
- Runners-up: Japan
- Third place: South Korea
- Fourth place: North Korea

The 1991 Asian Women's Volleyball Championship was the sixth edition of the Asian Championship, a biennial international volleyball tournament organised by the Asian Volleyball Confederation (AVC) with Thailand Volleyball Association (TVA). The tournament was held in Bangkok, Thailand from 14 to 21 September 1991.

== Preliminary round ==
| Pos | Team | Pld | W | L | Pts | SW | SL | SR | SPW | SPL | SPR | Qualification |
|---|---|---|---|---|---|---|---|---|---|---|---|---|
| 1 | China | 2 | 2 | 0 | 4 | 6 | 0 | MAX | 0 | 0 | — | Quarter-finals |
| 2 | Australia | 2 | 1 | 1 | 3 | 3 | 3 | 1.000 | 61 | 63 | 0.968 | Quarter-finals |
| 3 | Sri Lanka | 2 | 0 | 2 | 2 | 0 | 6 | 0.000 | 0 | 0 | — | |

| Date | | Score | | Set 1 | Set 2 | Set 3 | Set 4 | Set 5 | Total |
|---|---|---|---|---|---|---|---|---|---|
| | Australia | 0–3 | China | 1–15 | 9–15 | 6–15 | | | 16–45 |
| | Sri Lanka | 0–3 | Australia | 8–15 | 7–15 | 4–15 | | | 19–45 |
| | China | 3–0 | Sri Lanka | | | | | | |

== Quarter-finals ==
- The results and the points of the matches between the same teams that were already played during the preliminary round shall be taken into account for the Quarter-finals.

=== Pool E ===
| Pos | Team | Pld | W | L | Pts | SW | SL | SR | SPW | SPL | SPR | Qualification |
|---|---|---|---|---|---|---|---|---|---|---|---|---|
| 1 | South Korea | 3 | 3 | 0 | 6 | 0 | 0 | — | 0 | 0 | — | Championship round |
| 2 | North Korea | 3 | 2 | 1 | 5 | 0 | 0 | — | 0 | 0 | — | Championship round |
| 3 | Thailand | 3 | 1 | 2 | 4 | 0 | 0 | — | 0 | 0 | — | 5th–8th classification |
| 4 | Vietnam | 3 | 0 | 3 | 3 | 0 | 0 | — | 0 | 0 | — | 5th–8th classification |

=== Pool F ===
| Pos | Team | Pld | W | L | Pts | SW | SL | SR | SPW | SPL | SPR | Qualification |
|---|---|---|---|---|---|---|---|---|---|---|---|---|
| 1 | China | 3 | 3 | 0 | 6 | 0 | 0 | — | 0 | 0 | — | Championship round |
| 2 | Japan | 3 | 2 | 1 | 5 | 0 | 0 | — | 0 | 0 | — | Championship round |
| 3 | Chinese Taipei | 3 | 1 | 2 | 4 | 0 | 0 | — | 0 | 0 | — | 5th–8th classification |
| 4 | Australia | 3 | 0 | 3 | 3 | 0 | 9 | 0.000 | 40 | 135 | 0.296 | 5th–8th classification |

| Date | | Score | | Set 1 | Set 2 | Set 3 | Set 4 | Set 5 | Total |
|---|---|---|---|---|---|---|---|---|---|
| | Australia | 0–3 | Japan | 1–15 | 3–15 | 0–15 | | | 4–45 |
| | China | 3–? | Chinese Taipei | | | | | | |
| | Australia | 0–3 | Chinese Taipei | 8–15 | 5–15 | 7–15 | | | 20–45 |
| | China | 3–? | Japan | | | | | | |

== Final round ==
=== Classification 5th–8th ===
5th–8th places
20 September – Bangkok
Thailand | 2
Australia | 3
20 September – Bangkok
Chinese Taipei | 3
Vietnam | 1

5th place
21 September – Bangkok
Australia | 0
Chinese Taipei | 3
7th place
21 September – Bangkok
Thailand | 3
Vietnam | 0

| Date | | Score | | Set 1 | Set 2 | Set 3 | Set 4 | Set 5 | Total |
|---|---|---|---|---|---|---|---|---|---|
| 20 Sep | Thailand | 2–3 | Australia | 15–13 | 14–16 | 15–8 | 12–15 | 13–15 | 69–67 |
| 20 Sep | Chinese Taipei | 3–1 | Vietnam | | | | | | |

| Date | | Score | | Set 1 | Set 2 | Set 3 | Set 4 | Set 5 | Total |
|---|---|---|---|---|---|---|---|---|---|
| 21 Sep | Thailand | 3–0 | Vietnam | | | | | | |
| 21 Sep | Australia | 0–3 | Chinese Taipei | 10–15 | 8–15 | 8–15 | | | 26–45 |

=== Championship ===
Semifinals
20 September – Bangkok
South Korea | 0
Japan | 3
20 September – Bangkok
China | 3
North Korea | 0

Final
21 September – Bangkok
Japan | 0
China | 3
3rd place
21 September – Bangkok
South Korea | 3
North Korea | 0

| Date | | Score | | Set 1 | Set 2 | Set 3 | Set 4 | Set 5 | Total |
|---|---|---|---|---|---|---|---|---|---|
| 20 Sep | South Korea | 0–3 | Japan | 4–15 | 15–17 | 10–15 | | | 29–47 |
| 20 Sep | China | 3–0 | North Korea | | | | | | |

| Date | | Score | | Set 1 | Set 2 | Set 3 | Set 4 | Set 5 | Total |
|---|---|---|---|---|---|---|---|---|---|
| 21 Sep | South Korea | 3–0 | North Korea | | | | | | |
| 21 Sep | Japan | 0–3 | China | 8–15 | 14–16 | 10–15 | | | 32–46 |

== Final standing ==
| Rank | Team |
|---|---|
| 1st place, gold medalist(s) | China |
| 2nd place, silver medalist(s) | Japan |
| 3rd place, bronze medalist(s) | South Korea |
| 4 | North Korea |
| 5 | Chinese Taipei |
| 6 | Australia |
| 7 | Thailand |
| 8 | Vietnam |
| 9 | Indonesia |
| 10 | New Zealand |
| 11 | Hong Kong |
| 12 | Sri Lanka |
| 13 | Philippines |
| 14 | India |

| Qualified for the 1992 Olympic Games and 1991 World Cup |
| Qualified for the 1991 World Cup |

1991 Asian Women's champions

China
4th title
