= 1983 Asian Women's Volleyball Championship =

International indoor volleyball tournament

Tournament details
- Host country: Japan
- City: Fukuoka
- Dates: 10–17 November
- Teams: 9 (from 1 confederation)
- Venue: 1 (in 1 host city)

Final positions
- Champions: Japan (2nd title)
- Runners-up: China
- Third place: South Korea
- Fourth place: Chinese Taipei

The 1983 Asian Women's Volleyball Championship was the third edition of the Asian Championship, a quadrennial international volleyball tournament organised by the Asian Volleyball Confederation (AVC) with Japan Volleyball Association (JVA). The tournament was held in Fukuoka, Japan from 10 to 17 November 1983.

== Final round ==
=== Championship ===
Semifinals
16 November – Fukuoka
Japan	3
South Korea	0
16 November – Fukuoka
China	3
Chinese Taipei	0

Final
17 November – Fukuoka
Japan	3
China	0
3rd place
17 November – Fukuoka
South Korea	3
Chinese Taipei	0

Date		Score		Set 1	Set 2	Set 3	Set 4	Set 5	Total
16 Nov	Japan	3–0	South Korea	15–9	15–8	15–9			45–26
16 Nov	China	3–0	Chinese Taipei	15–3	15–2	15–5			45–10

Date		Score		Set 1	Set 2	Set 3	Set 4	Set 5	Total
17 Nov	South Korea	3–0	Chinese Taipei	15–4	15–1	15–6			45–11
17 Nov	Japan	3–0	China	15–10	15–10	15–11			45–31

== Final standing ==
Rank	Team
1st place, gold medalist(s)	Japan
2nd place, silver medalist(s)	China
3rd place, bronze medalist(s)	South Korea
4	Chinese Taipei
5	Philippines
6	Indonesia
7	Australia
8	Hong Kong
9	New Zealand

Qualified for the 1984 Olympic Games

1983 Asian Women's champions

Japan
2nd title
