= AVC Women's Volleyball Cup =

Indoor volleyball competition for women's national teams

- Most recent season or competition: 2026 AVC Women's Volleyball Cup
- Formerly: AVC Women's Challenge Cup (2022); AVC Challenge Cup for Women (2023–2024); AVC Women's Volleyball Nations Cup (2025)
- Sport: Volleyball
- Founded: 2022; 4 years ago
- First season: 2022
- No. of teams: 12
- Continent: Asia and Oceania (AVC)
- Most recent champions: South Korea (1st title)
- Most titles: Vietnam (3 titles)
- Broadcaster: VBTV
- Website: asianvolleyball.net

The AVC Women's Volleyball Cup (previously known as the AVC Women's Challenge Cup, AVC Challenge Cup for Women and AVC Women's Volleyball Nations Cup), is an annual international volleyball competition in Asia and Oceania contested by the senior women's national teams of the members of Asian Volleyball Confederation (AVC), the sport's continent governing body.

From 2023 to 2024, the winner will qualify for the FIVB Challenger Cup.

This event should not be confused with the other, more prestigious continental competition for Asian national women's volleyball teams, the Asian Volleyball Championship and the defunct AVC Cup for Women.

The five AVC Women's Volleyball Cup tournaments have been won by three different national teams. Vietnam has won thrice while Hong Kong and South Korea have won once each.

== History ==
Originally, the tournament was scheduled to be awarded every two years beginning in 2018. This tournament was initially catered to AVC member associations ranked 11th and below or that did not participate in the Asian Women's Volleyball Championship. It is set up to serve as a qualifier to the Women's Asian Volleyball Cup, which served as the tournament for the top teams of the AVC. The first two editions were due in Hong Kong, China. But due to unforeseen reasons, the first edition in 2018 was not held, while the second edition two years later was canceled due to grave concerns over the COVID-19 pandemic. The tournament first took place in 2022. The champions were Hong Kong, which won their first title at the 2022 edition in a round-robin format.

From 2023 to 2024, the AVC Challenge Cup has reformed from being held biennially to annually as it serve as a qualifier for the FIVB Challenger Cup. In both 2023 and 2024 edition, Vietnam were crowned as the champions, and qualified for 2023 FIVB Challenger Cup and 2024 FIVB Challenger Cup respectively.

Starting in 2025, the tournament was rebranded and would be known as the AVC Women's Volleyball Nations Cup. With the new format of the Nations League and the abolishment of the Challenger Cup, this tournament would be served as an annual competition for teams not participating in the VNL to earn world ranking points to increase their place in the FIVB Senior World Rankings, and possibly qualify to the future editions of the VNL. This tournament also served as a direct qualifier for the Asian Women's Volleyball Championship, with the champions earning a spot starting at the 2026 edition.

== Results summary ==
=== Finals ===
Year	Host	Final			3rd place match			Teams
Year	Host	Champions	Score	Runners-up	3rd place	Score	4th place	Teams
2022; Details	(Thailand); Nakhon Pathom	Hong Kong	Round-robin (3–2)	India	Malaysia	Round-robin (3–2)	Uzbekistan	5
2023; Details	(Indonesia); Gresik	Vietnam	3–2	Indonesia	Chinese Taipei	3–0	India	11
2024; Details	(Philippines); Manila	Vietnam	3–0	Kazakhstan	Philippines	3–0	Australia	10
2025; Details	(Vietnam); Hanoi	Vietnam	3–0	Philippines	Chinese Taipei	3–1	Kazakhstan	11
2026; Details	(Philippines); Candon	South Korea	3–0	Chinese Taipei	Vietnam	3–0	Kazakhstan	12

=== Performances by team ===
Team	Champions	Runners-up	3rd place	4th place	Total
Vietnam	3	0	1	0	4
Hong Kong	1	0	0	0	1
South Korea	1	0	0	0	1
Chinese Taipei	0	1	2	0	3
Philippines	0	1	1	0	2
Kazakhstan	0	1	0	2	3
India	0	1	0	1	2
Indonesia	0	1	0	0	1
Malaysia	0	0	1	0	1
Uzbekistan	0	0	0	1	1
Australia	0	0	0	1	1

=== Performances by zonal association ===
Zonal association	Champions	Runners-up	3rd place	4th place	Total
SAVA (Southeast Asia)	3	2	3	0	8
EAVA (East Asia)	2	1	2	0	5
CAVA (Central Asia)	0	2	0	4	6
OZVA (Oceania)	0	0	0	1	1

== Medal summary ==
Rank	Nation	Gold	Silver	Bronze	Total
1	Vietnam	3	0	1	4
2	Hong Kong	1	0	0	1
2	South Korea	1	0	0	1
4	Chinese Taipei	0	1	2	3
5	Philippines	0	1	1	2
6	India	0	1	0	1
6	Indonesia	0	1	0	1
6	Kazakhstan	0	1	0	1
9	Malaysia	0	0	1	1
Totals (9 entries)		5	5	5	15

== National team appearances ==
=== Comprehensive team results ===
Year Team	(Thailand) 2022 (5)	(Indonesia) 2023 (11)	(Philippines) 2024 (10)	(Vietnam) 2025 (11)	(Philippines) 2026 (12)	Total
Australia	•	6th	4th	7th	6th	4
Chinese Taipei	•	3rd	9th	3rd	2nd	4
Hong Kong	1st	9th	8th	8th	9th	5
India	2nd	4th	5th	9th	•	4
Indonesia	•	2nd	7th	5th	5th	4
Iran	•	5th	6th	6th	7th	4
Kazakhstan	•	•	2nd	4th	4th	3
Kyrgyzstan	•	•	•	•	11th	1
Lebanon	•	•	•	•	12th	1
Macau	•	11th	•	•	•	1
Malaysia	3rd	•	•	•	•	1
Mongolia	•	10th	•	10th	•	2
New Zealand	•	•	•	11th	•	1
Philippines	•	7th	3rd	2nd	8th	4
Singapore	5th	•	10th	•	•	2
South Korea	•	•	•	•	1st	1
Uzbekistan	4th	8th	•	•	10th	3
Vietnam	•	1st	1st	1st	3rd	4

Legend
1st	Champions
2nd	Runners-up
3rd	3rd place
4th	4th place
Q	Qualified for upcoming tournament
••	Qualified but withdrew
•	Did not qualify
×	Withdrew before qualification / Banned by FIVB
	Hosts
	Did not enter
—N/a	Not a FIVB member

=== Debut of teams ===
Year	Debutants	Total
2022	Hong Kong, India, Malaysia, Singapore, Uzbekistan	5
2023	Australia, Chinese Taipei, Indonesia, Iran, Macau, Mongolia, Philippines, Vietnam	8
2024	Kazakhstan	1
2025	New Zealand	1
2026	Kyrgyzstan, Lebanon, South Korea	3

== Awards ==
Year	Most Valuable Player
2022	(Hong Kong) Chim Wing Lam
2023	(Vietnam) Trần Thị Thanh Thúy
2024	(Vietnam) Nguyễn Thị Bích Tuyền
2025	(Vietnam) Nguyễn Thị Bích Tuyền
2026	(South Korea) Kang So-hwi

Year	Best Setter
2022	(India) Jini K.S
2023	(Vietnam) Đoàn Thị Lâm Oanh
2024	(Philippines) Jia de Guzman
2025	(Philippines) Jia de Guzman
2026	(Vietnam) Võ Thị Kim Thoa

Year	Best Outside Spikers
2022	(Malaysia) Low Mei Cing
2022	(Hong Kong) Pang Wing Lam
2023	(Vietnam) Trần Thị Thanh Thúy
2023	(Chinese Taipei) Wu Fang-yu
2024	(Australia) Caitlin Tipping
2024	(Kazakhstan) Sana Anarkulova
2025	(Philippines) Angel Canino
2025	(Vietnam) Trần Thị Thanh Thúy
2026	(Chinese Taipei) Tsai Yu-chun
2026	(South Korea) Kang So-hwi

Year	Best Middle Blockers
2022	(Malaysia) Ngin Jia Ning
2022	(Hong Kong) Lau Ho Ting
2023	(Vietnam) Đinh Thị Trà Giang
2023	(Indonesia) Wilda Nurfadhilah
2024	(Vietnam) Lê Thanh Thúy
2024	(Kazakhstan) Yuliya Yakimova
2025	(Chinese Taipei) Kan Ko-hui
2025	(Philippines) Dell Palomata
2026	(South Korea) Park Eun-jin
2026	(Chinese Taipei) Chen Ciao-en

Year	Best Opposite Spiker
2022	(India) Saranya N.S
2023	(Indonesia) Megawati Hangestri Pertiwi
2024	(Philippines) Angel Canino
2025	(Vietnam) Nguyễn Thị Bích Tuyền
2026	(South Korea) Na Hyun-soo

Year	Best Libero
2022	(India) Aswathi R.
2023	(Indonesia) Yulis Indahyani
2024	(Vietnam) Nguyễn Khánh Đang
2025	(Vietnam) Nguyễn Khánh Đang
2026	(Chinese Taipei) Lin Chi-jung

== See also ==
- AVC Men's Volleyball Cup
- AVC Women's Volleyball Continental Championship
- AVC Women's U20 Volleyball Championship
- AVC Girls' U18 Volleyball Championship
- AVC Girls' U16 Volleyball Championship
