= Kazakhstan women's national volleyball team =

National sports team

Kazakhstan
- Association: Kazakhstan Volleyball Federation
- Confederation: AVC
- Head coach: Darko Dobreskov
- FIVB ranking: 35 (24 May 2026)

Uniforms
Home	Away

Summer Olympics
- Appearances: 1 (First in 2008)
- Best result: 9th (2008)

World Championship
- Appearances: 3 (First in 2006)
- Best result: 15th (2014)
- http://volley.kz/eng
Honours
Asian Games
Bronze medal – third place	2010 Guangzhou	Team
Asian Championship
Silver medal – second place	2005 Taicang	Team
Asian Cup
Silver medal – second place	2016 Vĩnh Phúc	Team
Bronze medal – third place	2012 Almaty	Team
Bronze medal – third place	2014 Shenzhen	Team
Asian Nations Cup
Silver medal – second place	2024 Manila	Team
CAVA Championship
Silver medal – second place	2026 Kathmandu	Team
CAVA Challenge Cup
Silver medal – second place	2023 Kathmandu	Team

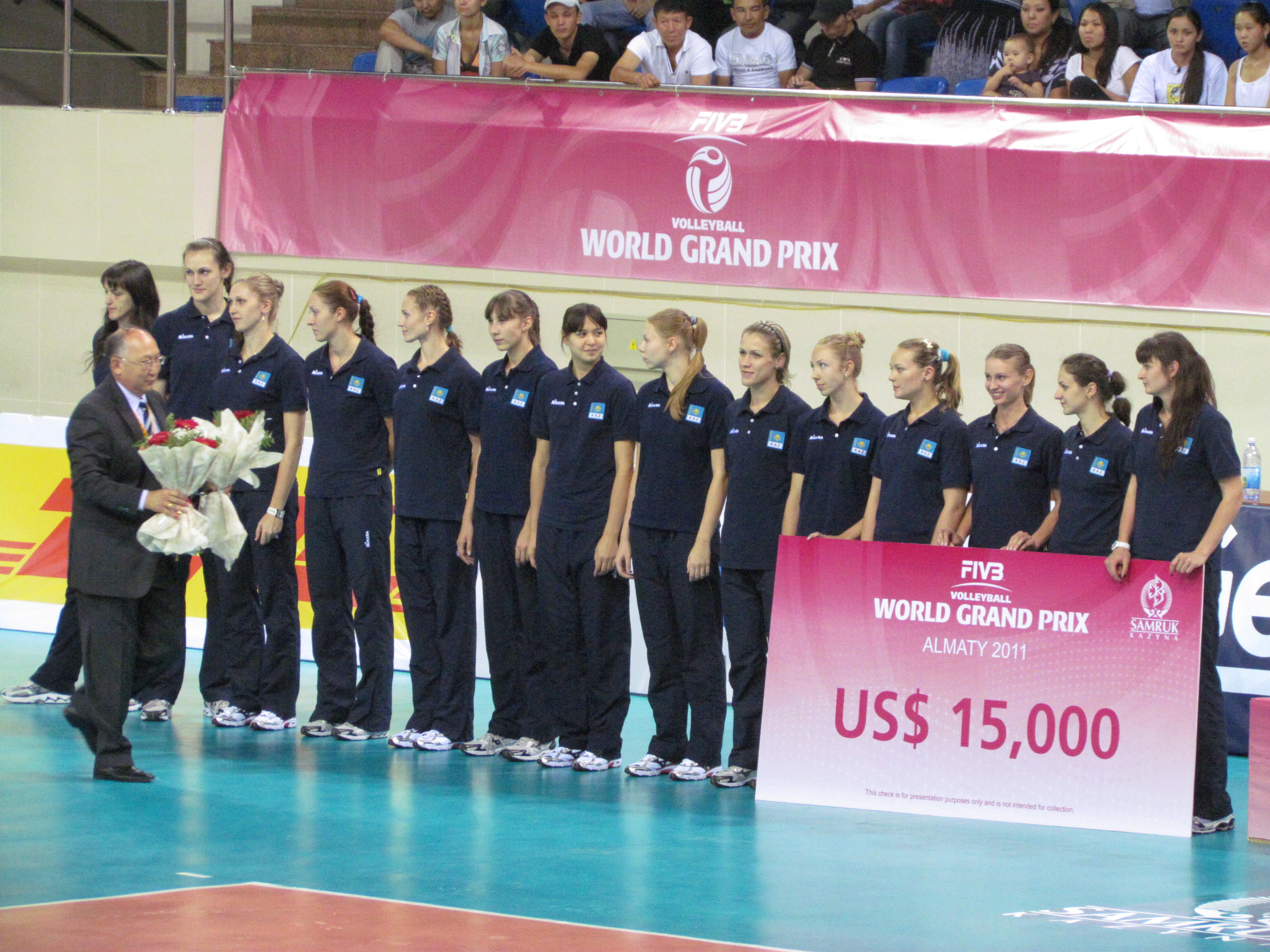
Kazakhstan women's national volleyball team. World Grand Prix 2011's preliminary round in Almaty

The Kazakhstan women's national volleyball team represents Kazakhstan in international volleyball competitions. The team qualified for the 2008 Summer Olympics by ending up in fifth place at the Olympic Qualifier in Japan.

== Results ==
=== Olympic Games ===
#	Year	Rank	M	W	L	SW	SL	PW	PL
1-11	1964-04	Did not enter or qualify							
12	2008	9th	5	1	4	4	13	323	404
13-16	2012-24	Did not enter or qualify							
Total	1/16	-	5	1	4	4	13	323	404

=== World Championship ===
#	Year	Rank	M	W	L	SW	SL	PW	PL
1-14	1952-02	Did not enter or qualify							
15	2006	17th	5	1	4	8	12	420	442
16	2010	21st	5	0	5	3	15	335	430
17	2014	15th	9	2	7	6	21	518	631
18	2018	24th	5	0	5	0	15	271	375
19	2022	23rd	5	0	5	0	15	244	375
20	2025	Did not qualify							
Total	5/20	-	29	3	26	17	78	1788	2253

=== World Grand Prix ===
#	Year	Rank	M	W	L	SW	SL	PW	PL
1-14	1993-06	Did not enter or qualify							
15	2007	10th	9	1	8	7	26	681	781
16	2008	12th	9	1	8	4	26	552	725
17-18	2009-10	Did not enter or qualify							
19	2011	15th	9	0	9	5	27	613	757
20	2012	Did not enter or qualify							
21	2013	17th	9	1	8	8	25	623	790
22	2014	24th	8	3	5	12	15	592	597
23	2015	26th	6	3	3	9	11	416	437
24	2016	22nd	8	5	3	17	13	676	617
25	2017	24th	9	1	8	5	25	567	724
Total	8/25	-	67	15	52	67	168	4720	5428

=== Challenger Cup ===
- 2018 — withdrew
- 2019 — did not enter
- 2022 — 7th place
- 2023 — did not enter
- 2024 — did not qualify

=== Asian Championship ===
- 1993 — 5th place
- 1999 — 9th place
- 2003 — 7th place
- 2005 — Silver Medal
- 2007 — 5th place
- 2009 — 5th place
- 2011 — 9th place
- 2013 — 5th place
- 2015 — 7th place
- 2017 — 7th place
- 2019 — 5th place
- 2023 — 5th place
- 2026 — 9th place

=== Asian Games ===
- 1998 — 6th place
- 2002 — 6th place
- 2006 — 6th place
- 2010 — Bronze Medal
- 2014 — 6th place
- 2018 — 5th place
- 2022 — 8th place
- 2026 — 8th place

=== Asian Cup ===
- 2008 — Withdrew
- 2010 — 5th place
- 2012 — Bronze Medal
- 2014 — Bronze Medal
- 2016 — Silver Medal
- 2018 — 10th place
- 2022 — Withdrew

=== AVC Cup ===
- 2022 — Did not enter
- 2023 — Withdrew
- 2024 — Silver Medal
- 2025 — 4th place
- 2026 — 4th place

=== CAVA Challenge Cup ===
- 2023 — Silver Medal

=== CAVA Championship ===
- 2026— Silver Medal

== Current squad ==
Kazakhstan women's national volleyball team.
Position	Name	Date of birth	Height	Current team
S	Odina Brobkalova	June 13, 2005 (age 21)	1.88 m (6 ft 2 in)	(Kazakhstan) Karaganda
OH	Madina Rakimova	December 22, 2008 (age 17)	1.97 m (6 ft 6 in)	(Kazakhstan) Karaganda
S	Daliya Artamova	November 27, 2008 (age 17)	1.95 m (6 ft 5 in)	(Kazakhstan) Karaganda
L	Olga Salbenko	February 18, 2010 (age 16)	1.78 m (5 ft 10 in)	(Kazakhstan) Karaganda
OP	Yana Abdullaeva	May 22, 2008 (age 18)	1.92 m (6 ft 4 in)	(Kazakhstan) Karaganda
MB	Aksana Sakimova	September 24, 2008 (age 17)	1.98 m (6 ft 6 in)	(Kazakhstan) Karaganda
MB	Shahnoza Uzakolova	June 11, 2010 (age 16)	2.00 m (6 ft 7 in)	(Kazakhstan) Karaganda
OH	Oleksandra Balassinova (c)	January 22, 2009 (age 17)	1.97 m (6 ft 6 in)	(Kazakhstan) Karaganda
OP	Marigona Olshentonova	July 19, 2006 (age 20)	1.98 m (6 ft 6 in)	(Kazakhstan) Karaganda
OH	Hana Markyzyshoska	May 2, 2011 (age 15)	1.90 m (6 ft 3 in)	(Kazakhstan) Karaganda
L	Razia Bekilova	August 23, 2012 (age 14)	1.73 m (5 ft 8 in)	(Kazakhstan) Karaganda
OH	Tirana Kobaleva	December 1, 2007 (age 18)	1.94 m (6 ft 4 in)	(Kazakhstan) Karaganda
OH	Tatyana Artamova	March 28, 2009 (age 17)	1.93 m (6 ft 4 in)	(Kazakhstan) Karaganda
MB	Dani Kayenessova	August 27, 2006 (age 20)	1.97 m (6 ft 6 in)	(Kazakhstan) Karaganda
