= 2014 AVC Cup for Women =

International indoor volleyball tournament

2014 Asian Women's Volleyball Cup

Tournament details
- Host country: China
- City: Shenzhen
- Dates: 6–12 September
- Teams: 8 (from 1 confederation)
- Venue: 1 (in 1 host city)

Final positions
- Champions: China (3rd title)
- Runners-up: South Korea
- Third place: Kazakhstan
- Fourth place: Japan

Tournament awards
- MVP: (China) Yan Ni

The 2014 Asian Women's Volleyball Cup, so-called 2014 AVC Cup for Women was the fourth edition of the Asian Cup, a biennial international volleyball tournament organised by the Asian Volleyball Confederation (AVC) with Chinese Volleyball Association (CVA). The tournament was held in Universiade Centre Indoor Stadium, Shenzhen, China from 6 to 12 September 2014.

== Pools composition ==
The teams are seeded based on their final ranking at the 2012 Asian Women's Cup Volleyball Championship.

Pool A	Pool B
China (Host); Vietnam (4th); South Korea; Iran	Thailand (1st); Kazakhstan (3rd); Japan; Chinese Taipei

== Preliminary round ==
=== Pool A ===
Pos	Team	Pld	W	L	Pts	SW	SL	SR	SPW	SPL	SPR	Qualification
1	China	3	3	0	9	9	0	MAX	226	163	1.387	Quarterfinals
2	South Korea	3	2	1	6	6	3	2.000	218	159	1.371	Quarterfinals
3	Vietnam	3	1	2	3	3	7	0.429	190	236	0.805	Quarterfinals
4	Iran	3	0	3	0	1	9	0.111	173	249	0.695	Quarterfinals

Date	Time		Score		Set 1	Set 2	Set 3	Set 4	Set 5	Total	Report
06 Sep	16:00	China	3–0	Vietnam	25–16	25–15	25–12			75–43	Report
06 Sep	19:30	South Korea	3–0	Iran	25–11	25–11	25–13			75–35	Report
07 Sep	14:00	China	3–0	Iran	25–17	25–13	25–22			75–52	Report
07 Sep	19:30	Vietnam	0–3	South Korea	13–25	16–25	19–25			48–75	Report
08 Sep	16:00	Iran	1–3	Vietnam	20–25	26–24	20–25	20–25		86–99	Report
08 Sep	19:30	China	3–0	South Korea	26–24	25–22	25–22			76–68	Report

=== Pool B ===
Pos	Team	Pld	W	L	Pts	SW	SL	SR	SPW	SPL	SPR	Qualification
1	Kazakhstan	3	3	0	8	9	2	4.500	259	220	1.177	Quarterfinals
2	Japan	3	2	1	6	6	3	2.000	215	192	1.120	Quarterfinals
3	Chinese Taipei	3	1	2	3	5	8	0.625	247	291	0.849	Quarterfinals
4	Thailand	3	0	3	1	2	9	0.222	230	248	0.927	Quarterfinals

Date	Time		Score		Set 1	Set 2	Set 3	Set 4	Set 5	Total	Report
06 Sep	12:00	Japan	0–3	Kazakhstan	23–25	23–25	18–25			64–75	Report
06 Sep	14:00	Chinese Taipei	3–2	Thailand	25–21	25–23	15–25	17–25	15–13	97–107	Report
07 Sep	12:00	Chinese Taipei	0–3	Japan	20–25	16–25	17–25			53–75	Report
07 Sep	16:00	Thailand	0–3	Kazakhstan	20–25	22–25	17–25			59–75	Report
08 Sep	12:00	Kazakhstan	3–2	Chinese Taipei	20–25	24–26	25–16	25–20	15–10	109–97	Report
08 Sep	14:00	Japan	3–0	Thailand	26–24	25–17	25–23			76–64	Report

== Final round ==
Quarterfinals
10 September – Shenzhen
Iran	1
Kazakhstan	3
10 September – Shenzhen
South Korea	3
Chinese Taipei	0
10 September – Shenzhen
China	3
Thailand	0
10 September – Shenzhen
Vietnam	1
Japan	3

Semifinals
11 September – Shenzhen
Kazakhstan	0
South Korea	3
11 September – Shenzhen
China	3
Japan	0

Final
12 September – Shenzhen
South Korea	0
China	3
3rd place
12 September – Shenzhen
Kazakhstan	3
Japan	2

5th–8th places
11 September – Shenzhen
Iran	1
Chinese Taipei	3
11 September – Shenzhen
Thailand	3
Vietnam	0

5th place
12 September – Shenzhen
Chinese Taipei	0
Thailand	3
7th place
12 September – Shenzhen
Iran	3
Vietnam	0

=== Quarterfinals ===
Date	Time		Score		Set 1	Set 2	Set 3	Set 4	Set 5	Total	Report
10 Sep	12:00	South Korea	3–0	Chinese Taipei	25–16	25–18	27–25			77–59	Report
10 Sep	14:00	Vietnam	1–3	Japan	21–25	25–20	14–25	13–25		73–95	Report
10 Sep	16:00	Iran	1–3	Kazakhstan	25–20	16–25	18–25	15–25		74–95	Report
10 Sep	19:30	China	3–0	Thailand	25–18	25–19	25–22			75–59	Report

=== 5th–8th semifinals ===
Date	Time		Score		Set 1	Set 2	Set 3	Set 4	Set 5	Total	Report
11 Sep	12:00	Iran	1–3	Chinese Taipei	25–21	19–25	16–25	16–25		76–96	Report
11 Sep	14:00	Thailand	3–0	Vietnam	25–23	25–22	27–25			77–70	Report

=== Semifinals ===
Date	Time		Score		Set 1	Set 2	Set 3	Set 4	Set 5	Total	Report
11 Sep	16:00	Kazakhstan	0–3	South Korea	18–25	15–25	21–25			54–75	Report
11 Sep	19:30	China	3–0	Japan	25–18	25–19	25–15			75–52	Report

=== 7th place ===
Date	Time		Score		Set 1	Set 2	Set 3	Set 4	Set 5	Total	Report
12 Sep	12:00	Iran	3–0	Vietnam	25–15	25–19	25–23			75–57	Report

=== 5th place ===
Date	Time		Score		Set 1	Set 2	Set 3	Set 4	Set 5	Total	Report
12 Sep	14:00	Chinese Taipei	0–3	Thailand	17–25	21–25	17–25			55–75	Report

=== 3rd place ===
Date	Time		Score		Set 1	Set 2	Set 3	Set 4	Set 5	Total	Report
12 Sep	16:00	Kazakhstan	3–2	Japan	26–28	25–23	25–14	19–25	15–7	110–97	Report

=== Final ===
Date	Time		Score		Set 1	Set 2	Set 3	Set 4	Set 5	Total	Report
12 Sep	19:30	South Korea	0–3	China	26–28	24–26	22–25			72–79	Report

== Final standing ==
Rank	Team
1st place, gold medalist(s)	China
2nd place, silver medalist(s)	South Korea
3rd place, bronze medalist(s)	Kazakhstan
4	Japan
5	Thailand
6	Chinese Taipei
7	Iran
8	Vietnam

2014 Asian Women's Cup champions

China
3rd title

Team roster
Yao Di, Yin Na, Wang Qian, Ding Xia, Yan Ni, Zhang Changning, Li Jing, Zhang Xiaoya, Liu Yanhan, Huang Liuyan, Wang Qi, Qiao Ting
Head Coach: Lang Ping

== Awards ==
- MVP
  (China) Yan Ni
- Best setter
  (China) Ding Xia
- Best outside spikers
  (China) Zhang Changning
  (China) Liu Yanhan
- Best middle blockers
  (China) Yan Ni
  (South Korea) Yang Hyo-jin
- Best opposite spiker
  (South Korea) Kim Yeon-koung
- Best libero
  (Japan) Miku Torigoe

== See also ==
- 2014 Asian Men's Volleyball Cup
