= 1987 Asian Women's Volleyball Championship =

International indoor volleyball tournament

Tournament details
- Host country: China
- City: Shanghai
- Dates: 6–14 June
- Teams: 11 (from 1 confederation)
- Venue: 1 (in 1 host city)

Final positions
- Champions: China (2nd title)
- Runners-up: Japan
- Third place: South Korea
- Fourth place: New Zealand

The 1987 Asian Women's Volleyball Championship was the fourth edition of the Asian Championship, a quadrennial international volleyball tournament organised by the Asian Volleyball Confederation (AVC) with Chinese Volleyball Association (CVA). The tournament was held in Shanghai, China from 6 to 14 June 1987.

== Preliminary round ==
=== Pool A ===
Pos	Team	Pld	W	L	Pts	SW	SL	SR	SPW	SPL	SPR	Qualification
1	China	5	5	0	10	12	0	MAX	0	0	—	Championship round
2	New Zealand	5	4	1	9	0	0	—	0	0	—	Championship round
3	Thailand	5	3	2	8	0	0	—	0	0	—	5th–8th classification
4	Indonesia	5	2	3	7	0	0	—	0	0	—	5th–8th classification
5	Malaysia	5	1	4	6	0	0	—	0	0	—	9th–11th classification
6	Hong Kong	5	0	5	5	0	0	—	0	0	—	9th–11th classification

Date		Score		Set 1	Set 2	Set 3	Set 4	Set 5	Total
06 Jun	Indonesia	3–0	Malaysia	15–3	15–8	15–5			45–16
06 Jun	Hong Kong	0–3	China	3–15	1–15	2–15			6–45
09 Jun	China	3–0	New Zealand						
09 Jun	Hong Kong	0–3	Indonesia						
09 Jun	Malaysia	0–3	Thailand						

=== Pool B ===
Pos	Team	Pld	W	L	Pts	SW	SL	SR	SPW	SPL	SPR	Qualification
1	Japan	4	4	0	8	12	2	6.000	0	0	—	Championship round
2	South Korea	4	3	1	7	11	3	3.667	0	0	—	Championship round
3	Australia	4	2	2	6	0	0	—	0	0	—	5th–8th classification
4	Singapore	4	1	3	5	0	0	—	0	0	—	5th–8th classification
5	Macau	4	0	4	4	0	12	0.000	0	0	—	9th–11th classification

Date		Score		Set 1	Set 2	Set 3	Set 4	Set 5	Total
06 Jun	Japan	3–0	Australia	15–1	15–1	15–1			45–3
06 Jun	Macau	0–3	Singapore	4–15	6–15	0–15			10–45
	South Korea	3–0	Australia	15–0	15–1	15–1			45–2
	Japan	3–2	South Korea	5–15	15–13	15–3	5–15	15–6	55–52
09 Jun	Macau	0–3	Japan						

== Final round ==
=== Classification 9th–11th ===
9th–11th places
13 June – Shanghai
Malaysia	3
Bye	0
13 June – Shanghai
Macau	?
Hong Kong	3

9th place
14 June – Shanghai
Malaysia	3
Hong Kong	?

Date		Score		Set 1	Set 2	Set 3	Set 4	Set 5	Total
13 Jun	Macau	?–3	Hong Kong						

Date		Score		Set 1	Set 2	Set 3	Set 4	Set 5	Total
14 Jun	Malaysia	3–?	Hong Kong						

=== Classification 5th–8th ===
5th–8th places
13 June – Shanghai
Thailand	3
Singapore	?
13 June – Shanghai
Australia	2
Indonesia	3

5th place
14 June – Shanghai
Thailand	3
Indonesia	?
7th place
14 June – Shanghai
Singapore	2
Australia	3

Date		Score		Set 1	Set 2	Set 3	Set 4	Set 5	Total
13 Jun	Thailand	3–?	Singapore						
13 Jun	Australia	2–3	Indonesia						

Date		Score		Set 1	Set 2	Set 3	Set 4	Set 5	Total
14 Jun	Singapore	2–3	Australia						
14 Jun	Thailand	3–?	Indonesia						

=== Championship ===
Semifinals
13 June – Shanghai
China	3
South Korea	0
13 June – Shanghai
Japan	3
New Zealand	0

Final
14 June – Shanghai
China	3
Japan	0
3rd place
14 June – Shanghai
South Korea	3
New Zealand	0

Date		Score		Set 1	Set 2	Set 3	Set 4	Set 5	Total
13 Jun	Japan	3–0	New Zealand	15–2	15–2	15–2			45–6
13 Jun	China	3–0	South Korea	15–7	15–8	15–7			45–22

Date		Score		Set 1	Set 2	Set 3	Set 4	Set 5	Total
14 Jun	South Korea	3–0	New Zealand	15–1	15–1	15–1			45–3
14 Jun	China	3–0	Japan	15–7	15–12	15–8			45–27

== Final standing ==
Rank	Team
1st place, gold medalist(s)	China
2nd place, silver medalist(s)	Japan
3rd place, bronze medalist(s)	South Korea
4	New Zealand
5	Thailand
6	Indonesia
7	Australia
8	Singapore
9	Malaysia
10	Hong Kong
11	Macau

Qualified for the 1988 Olympic Games as reigning champions
Qualified for the 1988 Olympic Games as hosts
Qualified for the 1988 Olympic Games
Qualified for the 1988 Intercontinental Olympic Qualification

1987 Asian Women's champions

China
2nd title
