= Volleyball at the 2019 SEA Games – Women's tournament =

Women's volleyball tournament at the 2019 SEA Games
- Venue: PhilSports Arena, Pasig
- Dates: 3–9 December
- Nations: 4

Medalists
gold medal	Thailand
silver medal	Vietnam
bronze medal	Indonesia

The women's volleyball tournament at the 2019 SEA Games was held at the PhilSports Arena in Pasig.

== Draw ==
No draw was made following the withdrawal of Malaysia leaving the number of participating team to four. Myanmar and Timor Leste also expressed interest for their potential participation but decided not to enter. Singapore also withdrew.

== Participating nations ==
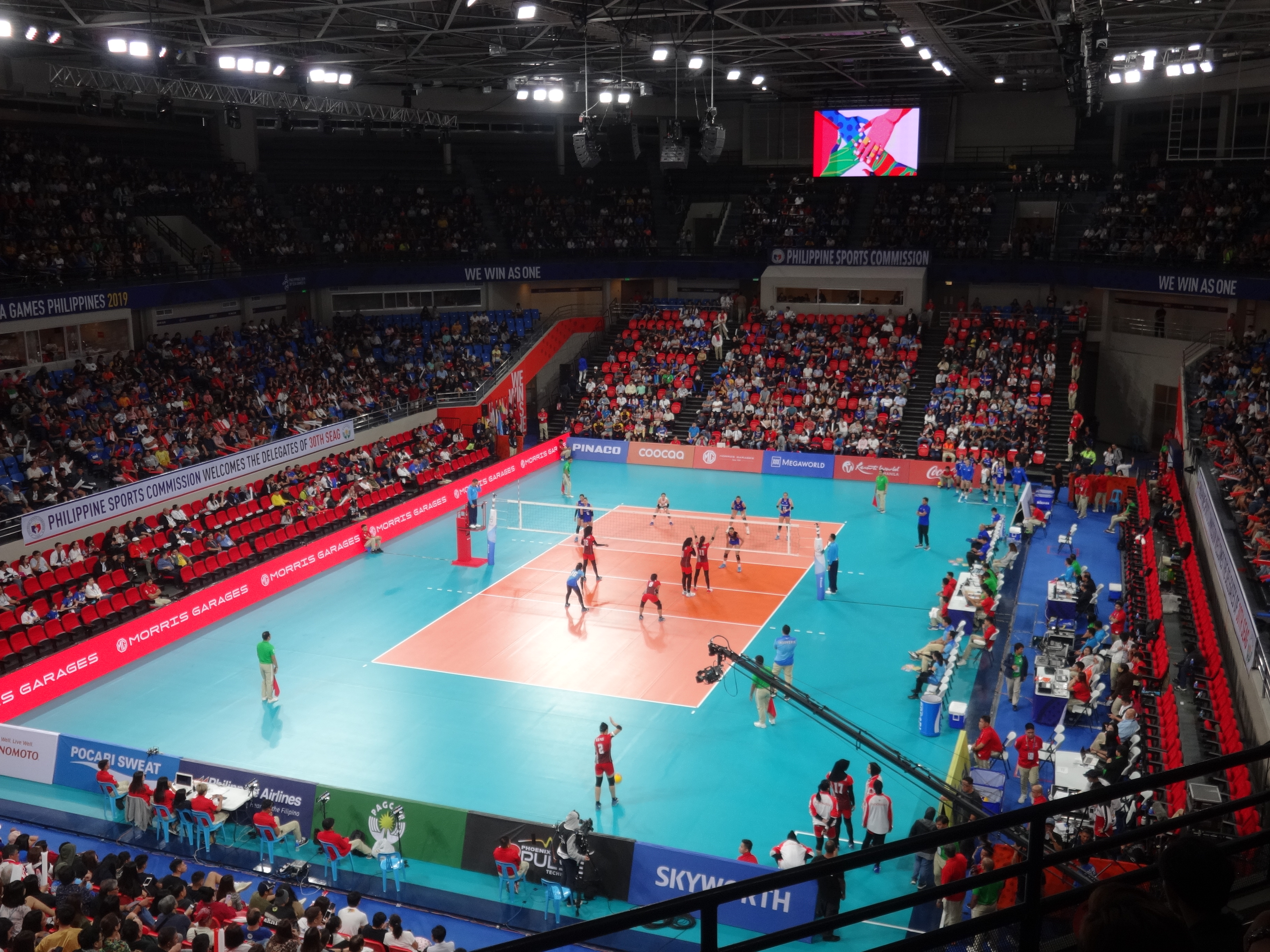
The Philsports Arena, the venue of the women's volleyball tournament.

- Indonesia
- Philippines
- Thailand
- Vietnam

== Results ==
=== Preliminary round ===
Pos	Team	Pld	W	L	Pts	SW	SL	SR	SPW	SPL	SPR	Qualification
1	Thailand	3	3	0	9	9	0	MAX	234	168	1.393	Gold medal match
2	Vietnam	3	2	1	4	6	7	0.857	261	263	0.992	Gold medal match
3	Indonesia	3	1	2	4	5	7	0.714	225	256	0.879	Bronze medal match
4	Philippines	3	0	3	1	3	9	0.333	257	290	0.886	Bronze medal match

Date	Time		Score		Set 1	Set 2	Set 3	Set 4	Set 5	Total	Report
3 Dec	15:30	Thailand	3–0	Indonesia	25–13	25–15	25–9			75–37	Report
3 Dec	18:00	Philippines	2–3	Vietnam	25–21	23–25	19–25	25–20	8–15	100–106	Report
5 Dec	15:30	Indonesia	2–3	Vietnam	25–20	14–25	25–19	18–25	6–15	88–104	Report
5 Dec	18:00	Thailand	3–0	Philippines	25–16	25–22	34–32			84–70	Report
7 Dec	15:30	Vietnam	0–3	Thailand	16–25	20–25	15–25			51–75	Report
7 Dec	18:00	Philippines	1–3	Indonesia	25–22	26–28	22–25	14–25		87–100	Report

=== Final round ===
==== Bronze medal match ====
Date	Time		Score		Set 1	Set 2	Set 3	Set 4	Set 5	Total	Report
9 Dec	15:30	Indonesia	3–2	Philippines	25–20	24–26	25–15	20–25	16–14	110–100	Report

==== Gold medal match ====
Date	Time		Score		Set 1	Set 2	Set 3	Set 4	Set 5	Total	Report
9 Dec	18:00	Thailand	3–0	Vietnam	25–15	25–15	25–17			75–47	Report

== Final standings ==
Rank	Team
1st place, gold medalist(s)	Thailand
2nd place, silver medalist(s)	Vietnam
3rd place, bronze medalist(s)	Indonesia
4	Philippines

== See also ==
- Men's tournament
