= 2026 SEA Women's V Cup =

Southeast Asian volleyball tournament

- Official logo
- Association: Southeast Asian Volleyball Association
- League: SEA V Cup
- Sport: Volleyball
- Duration: 31 July – 9 August
- Matches: 12
- Teams: 4

First Leg
- Season champions: Thailand
- Runners-up: Vietnam
- Season MVP: (Thailand) Sasipaporn Janthawisut

Second Leg
- Season champions: Thailand
- Runners-up: Philippines
- Season MVP: (Thailand) Sasipaporn Janthawisut

Seasons
- ← 2025

The 2026 SEA Women's V Cup was the sixth edition of the SEA V Cup, contested by four women's national teams that are members of the Southeast Asian Volleyball Association (SAVA), the sport's regional governing body affiliated to the Asian Volleyball Confederation (AVC). From 2023 to 2025, the SEA V Cup was known as the SEA V.League.

The first leg took place in Hanoi, Vietnam, from 31 July to 2 August, while the second leg took place in Chiang Mai, Thailand, from 7 to 9 August.

== Teams ==
- Indonesia
- Philippines
- Thailand
- Vietnam

== Venues ==
First Leg	Second Leg
Hanoi, Vietnam	Chiang Mai, Thailand
Đông Anh Gymnasium	700th Anniversary; Chiang Mai Sports Complex
Capacity: 2,650	Capacity: 3,000

== Pool standing procedure ==
1. Total number of victories (matches won, matches lost)
2. In the event of a tie, the following first tiebreaker will apply: The teams will be ranked by the most points gained per match as follows:
  - Match won 3–0 or 3–1: 3 points for the winner, 0 points for the loser
  - Match won 3–2: 2 points for the winner, 1 point for the loser
  - Match forfeited: 3 points for the winner, 0 points (0–25, 0–25, 0–25) for the loser
3. If teams are still tied after examining the number of victories and points gained, then the SAVA will examine the results to break the tie in the following order:
  - Set quotient: if two or more teams are tied on the number of points gained, they will be ranked by the quotient resulting from the division of the number of all set won by the number of all sets lost.
  - Points quotient: if the tie persists based on the set quotient, the teams will be ranked by the quotient resulting from the division of all points scored by the total of points lost during all sets.
  - If the tie persists based on the point quotient, the tie will be broken based on the team that won the match of the Round Robin Phase between the tied teams. When the tie in point quotient is between three or more teams, these teams are ranked taking into consideration only the matches involving the teams in question.

== First leg ==
=== Results ===
- All times are Indochina Time (UTC+07:00).

Pos	Team	Pld	W	L	Pts	SW	SL	SR	SPW	SPL	SPR
1	Thailand	3	3	0	8	9	3	3.000	284	236	1.203
2	Vietnam (H)	3	2	1	6	6	5	1.200	243	242	1.004
3	Indonesia	3	1	2	3	5	7	0.714	269	284	0.947
4	Philippines	3	0	3	1	4	9	0.444	262	296	0.885

Source: SAVA
(H) Host

Date	Time		Score		Set 1	Set 2	Set 3	Set 4	Set 5	Total	Attd	Report
31 Jul	16:00	Indonesia	1–3	Thailand	21–25	34–32	21–25	19–25		95–107	1,000	P2 Report
31 Jul	19:00	Vietnam	3–1	Philippines	29–27	25–17	20–25	25–19		99–88	1,200	P2 Report
1 Aug	16:00	Thailand	3–2	Philippines	25–17	19–25	25–15	18–25	15–10	102–92	1,000	P2 Report
1 Aug	19:00	Indonesia	1–3	Vietnam	25–20	15–25	19–25	20–25		79–95	2,000	P2 Report
2 Aug	16:00	Philippines	1–3	Indonesia	25–20	19–25	22–25	16–25		82–95	2,500	P2 Report
2 Aug	19:00	Thailand	3–0	Vietnam	25–18	25–17	25–14			75–49	3,100	P2 Report

=== Final standing ===
Rank	Team
1st place, gold medalist(s)	Thailand
2nd place, silver medalist(s)	Vietnam
3rd place, bronze medalist(s)	Indonesia
4	Philippines

2026 SEA V Cup – First Leg champions

Thailand
9th title

14–woman roster
Kanyarat Kunmuang, Warisara Seetaloed, Papatchaya Phontham, Waruni Kanram, Kalyarat Khamwong, Nannaphat Moonjakham, Sasipaporn Janthawisut, Natthanicha Jaisaen (c), Ajcharaporn Kongyot, Nirarach Srikuta, Serah Ankomah, Wimonrat Thanapan, Jidapa Nahuanong, Kaewkalaya Kamulthala
Head coach
Kiattipong Radchatagriengkai

=== Awards ===
- Most valuable player
  Sasipaporn Janthawisut (THA)
- Best setter
  Natthanicha Jaisaen (THA)
- Best outside spikers
  Sasipaporn Janthawisut (THA)
  Vi Thị Như Quỳnh (VIE)
- Best middle blockers
  Maradanti Namira Tegariani (INA)
  Kaewkalaya Kamulthala (THA)
- Best opposite spiker
  Alyssa Solomon (PHI)
- Best libero
  Nguyễn Khánh Đang (VIE)

== Second leg ==
=== Results ===
- All times are Indochina Time (UTC+07:00).

Pos	Team	Pld	W	L	Pts	SW	SL	SR	SPW	SPL	SPR
1	Thailand (H)	3	3	0	9	9	0	MAX	225	147	1.531
2	Philippines	3	2	1	6	6	5	1.200	258	254	1.016
3	Indonesia	3	1	2	2	4	8	0.500	238	282	0.844
4	Vietnam	3	0	3	1	3	9	0.333	237	275	0.862

Source: SAVA
(H) Host

Date	Time		Score		Set 1	Set 2	Set 3	Set 4	Set 5	Total	Attd	Report
7 Aug	13:00	Indonesia	3–2	Vietnam	20–25	18–25	25–22	25–20	15–9	103–101	2,500	P2 Report
7 Aug	16:30	Philippines	0–3	Thailand	19–25	17–25	19–25			55–75	3,500	P2 Report
8 Aug	13:00	Vietnam	1–3	Philippines	25–22	23–25	21–25	22–25		91–97	2,900	P2 Report
8 Aug	16:30	Thailand	3–0	Indonesia	25–18	25–17	25–12			75–47	3,600	P2 Report
9 Aug	13:00	Philippines	3–1	Indonesia	25–13	23–25	25–19	33–31		106–88	3,200	P2 Report
9 Aug	16:30	Thailand	3–0	Vietnam	25–20	25–10	25–15			75–45	4,500	P2 Report

=== Final standing ===
Rank	Team
1st place, gold medalist(s)	Thailand
2nd place, silver medalist(s)	Philippines
3rd place, bronze medalist(s)	Indonesia
4	Vietnam

2026 SEA V Cup – Second Leg champions

Thailand
10th title

14–woman roster
Piyanut Pannoy, Pornpun Guedpard (c), Kanyarat Kunmuang, Thatdao Nuekjang, Warisara Seetaloed, Kalyarat Khamwong, Sasipaporn Janthawisut, Natthanicha Jaisaen, Pimpichaya Kokram, Ajcharaporn Kongyot, Chatchu-on Moksri, Wimonrat Thanapan, Jidapa Nahuanong, Kaewkalaya Kamulthala
Head coach
Kiattipong Radchatagriengkai

=== Awards ===
- Most valuable player
  Sasipaporn Janthawisut (THA)
- Best setter
  Pornpun Guedpard (THA)
- Best outside spikers
  Sasipaporn Janthawisut (THA)
  Eya Laure (PHI)
- Best middle blockers
  Thatdao Nuekjang (THA)
  Trần Thị Bích Thủy (VIE)
- Best opposite spiker
  Alyssa Solomon (PHI)
- Best libero
  Indah Guretno Dwi Margiani (INA)

== Results and combined standings ==
=== Combined standings ===
Pos	Team	Pld	W	L	Pts	SW	SL	SR	SPW	SPL	SPR	Qualification
1	Thailand	6	6	0	17	18	3	6.000	509	383	1.329	2027 FIVB Nations League
2	Philippines	6	2	4	7	10	14	0.714	520	550	0.945	2027 AVC Cup
3	Vietnam	6	2	4	7	9	14	0.643	480	517	0.928	
4	Indonesia	6	2	4	5	9	15	0.600	507	566	0.896	

Source: FIVB Live Center

=== Summary ===
Leg	Date	Location	Champions	Runners-up	Third place
1	31 July – 2 August 2026	(Vietnam) Hanoi	Thailand (9)	Vietnam (7)	Indonesia (4)
2	7–9 August 2026	(Thailand) Chiang Mai	Thailand (10)	Philippines (1)	Indonesia (5)

== See also ==
- 2026 SEA Men's V Cup
