= 1979 Asian Women's Volleyball Championship =

International indoor volleyball tournament

Tournament details
- Host country: Hong Kong
- City: Hong Kong
- Dates: 7–14 December
- Teams: 7 (from 1 confederation)
- Venue: 1 (in 1 host city)

Final positions
- Champions: China (1st title)
- Runners-up: Japan
- Third place: South Korea
- Fourth place: Australia

The 1979 Asian Women's Volleyball Championship was the second edition of the Asian Championship, a quadrennial international volleyball tournament organised by the Asian Volleyball Confederation (AVC) with Volleyball Association of Hong Kong (VBAHK). The tournament was held in British Hong Kong from 7 to 14 August 1979.

== Results ==
Pos	Team	Pld	W	L	Pts	SW	SL	SR	SPW	SPL	SPR
1	China	6	6	0	12	18	1	18.000	285	91	3.132
2	Japan	6	5	1	11	16	4	4.000	286	114	2.509
3	South Korea	6	4	2	10	13	6	2.167	243	117	2.077
4	Australia	6	3	3	9	9	9	1.000	149	181	0.823
5	Indonesia	6	2	4	8	6	13	0.462	123	240	0.513
6	Hong Kong	6	1	5	7	4	15	0.267	116	259	0.448
7	India	6	0	6	6	0	18	0.000	71	271	0.262

Date		Score		Set 1	Set 2	Set 3	Set 4	Set 5	Total
07 Dec	South Korea	3–0	India	15–0	15–2	15–1			45–3
07 Dec	Hong Kong	0–3	Japan	1–15	1–15	2–15			4–45
07 Dec	China	3–0	Indonesia	15–2	15–2	15–2			45–6
08 Dec	South Korea	3–0	Hong Kong	15–2	15–4	15–2			45–8
08 Dec	India	0–3	China	0–15	0–15	2–15			2–45
08 Dec	Japan	3–0	Australia	15–0	15–6	15–2			45–8
09 Dec	Hong Kong	3–0	India	15–6	16–14	15–8			46–28
09 Dec	Australia	0–3	South Korea	4–15	0–15	0–15			4–45
09 Dec	Japan	3–0	Indonesia	15–2	15–0	15–2			45–4
10 Dec	India	0–3	Australia	1–15	13–15	3–15			17–45
10 Dec	China	3–0	Hong Kong	15–1	15–0	15–0			45–1
10 Dec	Indonesia	0–3	South Korea	0–15	2–15	1–15			3–45
11 Dec	Australia	3–0	Hong Kong	15–2	15–9	15–4			45–15
11 Dec	Indonesia	3–0	India	15–4	15–9	15–5			45–18
11 Dec	Japan	1–3	China	14–16	12–15	16–14	10–15		52–60
13 Dec	Hong Kong	1–3	Indonesia	15–6	6–15	10–15	11–15		42–51
13 Dec	China	3–0	Australia	15–0	15–1	15–1			45–2
13 Dec	South Korea	1–3	Japan	10–15	15–9	10–15	0–15		35–54
14 Dec	Australia	3–0	Indonesia	15–5	15–5	15–4			45–14
14 Dec	Japan	3–0	India	15–2	15–0	15–1			45–3
14 Dec	China	3–0	South Korea	15–6	15–13	15–9			45–28

== Final standing ==
Rank	Team
1st place, gold medalist(s)	China
2nd place, silver medalist(s)	Japan
3rd place, bronze medalist(s)	South Korea
4	Australia
5	Indonesia
6	Hong Kong
7	India

Qualified for the 1982 World Championship

1979 Asian Women's champions

China
1st title
