= Singapore women's national volleyball team =

National sports team

Singapore
- Association: Volleyball Association of Singapore
- Confederation: AVC
- FIVB ranking: 72 ▼3 (24 May 2026)

Uniforms
Home	Away

Asian Championship
- Appearances: 1 (First in 1987)
- Best result: 8 (1987)

Singapore women's national volleyball team
Medal record

Southeast Asian Games
Bronze medal – third place	1981 Manila	Team
Bronze medal – third place	2015 Singapore	Team

The Singapore women's national volleyball team represents Singapore in international women's volleyball competitions and friendly matches.

They qualified for the 1987 Asian Women's Volleyball Championship.

== Competition history ==
=== Asian Championship ===
- (China) 1987 – 8th place
- (South Korea) 2019 – Withdrew

=== Asian Nations Cup ===
- (Thailand) 2022 – 5th place
- (Philippines) 2024 – 10th place

=== SEA Games ===
- (Philippines) 1981 – Bronze Medal
- (Singapore) 1983 – Group Stage
- (Singapore) 1993 – Group Stage
- (Singapore) 2015 – Bronze medal
- (Cambodia) 2023 – 5th Place
- (Thailand) 2025 – 5th Place
