= 2024 AVC Challenge Cup for Women =

Asian women's volleyball tournament

- Official logo

Tournament details
- Host country: Philippines
- City: Manila
- Dates: 22–29 May
- Teams: 10 (from 1 confederation)
- Venue: 2 (in 1 host city)

Final positions
- Champions: Vietnam (2nd title)
- Runners-up: Kazakhstan
- Third place: Philippines
- Fourth place: Australia

Tournament awards
- MVP: (Vietnam) Nguyễn Thị Bích Tuyền
- Best Setter: (Philippines) Jia de Guzman
- Best OH: (Australia) Caitlin Tipping; (Kazakhstan) Sana Anarkulova
- Best MB: (Vietnam) Lê Thanh Thúy; (Kazakhstan) Yuliya Yakimova
- Best OPP: (Philippines) Angel Canino
- Best Libero: (Vietnam) Nguyễn Khánh Đang

Tournament statistics
- Matches played: 29
- Attendance: 50,731 (1,749 per match)

The 2024 AVC Challenge Cup for Women was the fifth edition of the AVC Challenge Cup for Women, an annual international volleyball tournament organized by the Asian Volleyball Confederation (AVC) and this year with the Philippine National Volleyball Federation (PNVF). It was held from 22 to 29 May 2024 in Manila, Philippines. The winners of the tournament, Vietnam, qualified for the 2024 FIVB Women's Volleyball Challenger Cup.

Vietnam won their second consecutive title after defeating Kazakhstan in the final. The host Philippines defeated Australia in the 3rd place match and took the bronze medal. Nguyễn Thị Bích Tuyền was named as the MVP of the tournament.

== Host selection ==
The Philippines had submitted its bid to host the tournament by December 2023.

== Team ==
=== Qualification ===
Following AVC regulations, the maximum of 12 teams for the next AVC Challenge Cup was selected through the following criteria:

- 1 team for the host country
- 1 team: the defending champion from the previous edition (2023)
- 5 other top-ranked teams from the previous edition
- 5 other entrant teams with consideration given for FIVB world rankings

=== Qualified teams ===
Country	Zone	Qualified as	Qualified on	Previous appearances			Previous best performance
Country	Zone	Qualified as	Qualified on	Total	First	Last	Previous best performance
Philippines	SEAVA	Host country	April 2024	1	2023		7th place (2023)
Vietnam	SEAVA	Defending champions	23 June 2023	1	2023		Champions (2023)
Indonesia	SEAVA	2023 Challenge Cup runners-up	23 June 2023	1	2023		Runners-up (2023)
Chinese Taipei	EAZVA	2023 Challenge Cup 3rd placers	23 June 2023	1	2023		3rd place (2023)
India	CAVA	2023 Challenge Cup 4th placers	23 June 2023	2	2022	2023	Runners-up (2022)
Iran	CAVA	2023 Challenge Cup 5th placers	24 June 2023	1	2023		5th place (2023)
Australia	OZVA	2023 Challenge Cup 6th placers	24 June 2023	1	2023		6th place (2023)
Kazakhstan	CAVA	Additional entrant teams	3 May 2024	0	None		None
Hong Kong	EAZVA	Additional entrant teams	3 May 2024	2	2022	2023	Champions (2022)
Singapore	SEAVA	Additional entrant teams	3 May 2024	1	2022		5th place (2022)

China, Japan, South Korea, Thailand which are part of the 2024 FIVB Women's Volleyball Nations League are ineligible to submit entries to this tournament.

== Venues ==
All matches (except 9th place match)	9th place match
Manila, Philippines
Rizal Memorial Sports Complex (Rizal Memorial Coliseum & Ninoy Aquino Stadium)
Capacity: 6,100	Capacity: 6,000

== Pools composition ==
The overview of pools was released on 3 May 2024.

Pool A	Pool B
Philippines (Hosts)	Vietnam (1)
Chinese Taipei (3)	Indonesia (2)
India (4)	Kazakhstan (–)
Iran (5)	Singapore (–)
Australia (6)	Hong Kong (–)

== Pool standing procedure ==
1. Total number of victories (matches won, matches lost)
2. In the event of a tie, the following first tiebreaker will apply: The teams will be ranked by the most point gained per match as follows:
  - Match won 3–0 or 3–1: 3 points for the winner, 0 points for the loser
  - Match won 3–2: 2 points for the winner, 1 point for the loser
  - Match forfeited: 3 points for the winner, 0 points (0–25, 0–25, 0–25) for the loser
3. If teams are still tied after examining the number of victories and points gained, then the AVC will examine the results in order to break the tie in the following order:
  - Set quotient: if two or more teams are tied on the number of points gained, they will be ranked by the quotient resulting from the division of the number of all set won by the number of all sets lost.
  - Points quotient: if the tie persists based on the set quotient, the teams will be ranked by the quotient resulting from the division of all points scored by the total of points lost during all sets.
  - If the tie persists based on the point quotient, the tie will be broken based on the team that won the match of the Round Robin Phase between the tied teams. When the tie in point quotient is between three or more teams, these teams ranked taking into consideration only the matches involving the teams in question.

== Squads ==
The full list of team squads were announced on the competition daily bulletin.

== Preliminary round ==
- All times are Philippine Standard Time (UTC+08:00).

=== Pool A ===
Pos	Team	Pld	W	L	Pts	SW	SL	SR	SPW	SPL	SPR	Qualification
1	Philippines (H)	4	4	0	12	12	2	6.000	344	258	1.333	Semifinals
2	Australia	4	3	1	9	10	6	1.667	385	369	1.043	Semifinals
3	India	4	2	2	6	8	6	1.333	323	305	1.059	5th–8th semifinals
4	Iran	4	1	3	3	4	10	0.400	310	347	0.893	5th–8th semifinals
5	Chinese Taipei	4	0	4	0	2	12	0.167	267	350	0.763	9th place match

Source: 2024 AVC Challenge Cup - Women
(H) Host

Date	Time		Score		Set 1	Set 2	Set 3	Set 4	Set 5	Total	Report
22 May	13:00	India	3–0	Iran	25–17	25–23	25–21			75–61	P2 Report
22 May	19:00	Australia	3–1	Chinese Taipei	23–25	25–15	25–19	25–18		98–77	P2 Report
23 May	13:00	Chinese Taipei	0–3	India	19–25	13–25	16–25			48–75	P2 Report
23 May	19:00	Philippines	3–1	Australia	22–25	25–19	25–16	25–21		97–81	P2 Report
24 May	10:00	Iran	3–1	Chinese Taipei	24–26	25–20	25–18	28–26		102–90	P2 Report
24 May	19:00	India	1–3	Philippines	25–22	21–25	17–25	18–25		81–97	P2 Report
25 May	16:00	Australia	3–1	India	26–24	25–16	19–25	29–27		99–92	P2 Report
25 May	19:00	Philippines	3–0	Iran	25–16	25–13	25–15			75–44	P2 Report
26 May	16:00	Iran	1–3	Australia	24–26	23–25	27–25	29–31		103–107	P2 Report
26 May	19:00	Chinese Taipei	0–3	Philippines	13–25	21–25	18–25			52–75	P2 Report

=== Pool B ===
Pos	Team	Pld	W	L	Pts	SW	SL	SR	SPW	SPL	SPR	Qualification
1	Vietnam	4	4	0	12	12	2	6.000	343	244	1.406	Semifinals
2	Kazakhstan	4	3	1	9	10	3	3.333	306	221	1.385	Semifinals
3	Hong Kong	4	2	2	6	6	6	1.000	236	253	0.933	5th–8th semifinals
4	Indonesia	4	1	3	3	4	9	0.444	264	292	0.904	5th–8th semifinals
5	Singapore	4	0	4	0	0	12	0.000	165	304	0.543	9th place match

Source: 2024 AVC Challenge Cup - Women

Date	Time		Score		Set 1	Set 2	Set 3	Set 4	Set 5	Total	Report
22 May	10:00	Singapore	0–3	Kazakhstan	15–25	9–25	17–25			41–75	P2 Report
22 May	16:00	Hong Kong	0–3	Vietnam	13–25	17–25	16–25			46–75	P2 Report
23 May	10:00	Indonesia	0–3	Hong Kong	22–25	24–26	19–25			65–76	P2 Report
23 May	16:00	Vietnam	3–0	Singapore	25–8	29–27	25–10			79–45	P2 Report
24 May	13:00	Kazakhstan	1–3	Vietnam	14–25	19–25	25–14	23–25		81–89	P2 Report
24 May	16:00	Singapore	0–3	Indonesia	14–25	13–25	14–25			41–75	P2 Report
25 May	10:00	Hong Kong	3–0	Singapore	25–14	25–12	25–12			75–38	P2 Report
25 May	13:00	Indonesia	0–3	Kazakhstan	17–25	13–25	22–25			52–75	P2 Report
26 May	10:00	Vietnam	3–1	Indonesia	25–17	25–15	25–27	25–13		100–72	P2 Report
26 May	13:00	Kazakhstan	3–0	Hong Kong	25–17	25–18	25–4			75–39	P2 Report

== Final round ==
- All times are Philippine Standard Time (UTC+08:00).

=== 9th place match ===
Date	Time		Score		Set 1	Set 2	Set 3	Set 4	Set 5	Total	Report
28 May	13:00	Chinese Taipei	3–0	Singapore	27–25	25–10	25–10			77–45	P2 Report

=== 5th–8th places ===
5th–8th semifinals
28 May
India	3
Indonesia	1
28 May
Hong Kong	1
Iran	3

5th place match
29 May
India	3
Iran	0
7th place match
29 May
Indonesia	3
Hong Kong	0

==== 5th–8th semifinals ====
Date	Time		Score		Set 1	Set 2	Set 3	Set 4	Set 5	Total	Report
28 May	10:00	India	3–1	Indonesia	25–16	30–32	25–20	27–25		107–93	P2 Report
28 May	13:00	Hong Kong	1–3	Iran	24–26	24–26	25–19	19–25		92–96	P2 Report

==== 7th place match ====
Date	Time		Score		Set 1	Set 2	Set 3	Set 4	Set 5	Total	Report
29 May	10:00	Indonesia	3–0	Hong Kong	25–15	25–19	25–20			75–54	P2 Report

==== 5th place match ====
Date	Time		Score		Set 1	Set 2	Set 3	Set 4	Set 5	Total	Report
29 May	13:00	India	3–0	Iran	25–17	25–16	25–11			75–44	P2 Report

=== Final four ===
Semifinals
28 May
Philippines	0
Kazakhstan	3
28 May
Vietnam	3
Australia	0

Final
29 May
Kazakhstan	0
Vietnam	3
3rd place match
29 May
Philippines	3
Australia	0

==== Semifinals ====
Date	Time		Score		Set 1	Set 2	Set 3	Set 4	Set 5	Total	Report
28 May	16:00	Vietnam	3–0	Australia	25–21	25–19	25–16			75–56	P2 Report
28 May	19:00	Philippines	0–3	Kazakhstan	23–25	21–25	14–25			58–75	P2 Report

==== 3rd place match ====
Date	Time		Score		Set 1	Set 2	Set 3	Set 4	Set 5	Total	Report
29 May	16:00	Philippines	3–0	Australia	25–23	25–15	25–7			75–45	P2 Report

==== Final ====
Date	Time		Score		Set 1	Set 2	Set 3	Set 4	Set 5	Total	Report
29 May	19:00	Kazakhstan	0–3	Vietnam	20–25	22–25	22–25			64–75	P2 Report

== Final standing ==
Rank	Team
1st place, gold medalist(s)	Vietnam
2nd place, silver medalist(s)	Kazakhstan
3rd place, bronze medalist(s)	Philippines
4	Australia
5	India
6	Iran
7	Indonesia
8	Hong Kong
9	Chinese Taipei
10	Singapore

Qualified for the 2024 FIVB Challenger Cup
Qualified as hosts for the 2024 FIVB Challenger Cup

2024 AVC Challenge Cup champions

Vietnam
Second title

14–woman roster
Nguyễn Thị Trà My, Trần Thị Thanh Thúy (c), Lê Thị Yến, Lê Thanh Thúy, Nguyễn Thị Bích Tuyền, Hoàng Thị Kiều Trinh, Nguyễn Khánh Đang, Võ Thị Kim Thoa, Nguyễn Thị Trinh, Vi Thị Như Quỳnh, Phạm Thị Hiền, Đoàn Thị Lâm Oanh, Trần Tú Linh, Đinh Thị Trà Giang
Head coach
Nguyễn Tuấn Kiệt

== Awards ==
Nguyễn Thị Bích Tuyền was the 2024 AVC Challenge Cup Most Valuable Player

- Most valuable player
  Nguyễn Thị Bích Tuyền (VIE)
- Best setter
  Jia de Guzman (PHI)
- Best outside spikers
  Caitlin Tipping (AUS)
  Sana Anarkulova (KAZ)
- Best middle blockers
  Lê Thanh Thúy (VIE)
  Yuliya Yakimova (KAZ)
- Best opposite spiker
  Angel Canino (PHI)
- Best libero
  Nguyễn Khánh Đang (VIE)

== See also ==
- 2024 FIVB Women's Volleyball Challenger Cup
