= 2022 AVC Women's Challenge Cup =

Asian women's volleyball tournament

- Official logo

Tournament details
- Host country: Thailand
- City: Nakhon Pathom
- Dates: 24–29 June
- Teams: 5 (from 1 confederation)
- Venue: 1 (in 1 host city)

Final positions
- Champions: Hong Kong (1st title)
- Runners-up: India
- Third place: Malaysia
- Fourth place: Uzbekistan

Tournament awards
- MVP: (Hong Kong) Chim Wing Lam
- Best Setter: (India) Jini K.S
- Best OH: (Malaysia) Low Mei Cing (Hong Kong) Pang Wing Lam
- Best MB: (Malaysia) Ngin Jia Ning (Hong Kong) Lau Ho Ting
- Best OPP: (India) Saranya N.S
- Best Libero: (India) Aswathi R.

Tournament statistics
- Matches played: 15
- Attendance: 6,500 (433 per match)

The 2022 AVC Women's Challenge Cup, in coincidence with the 21st Princess Cup Volleyball Championship, was the third edition of the AVC Women's Challenge Cup, a biennial international volleyball tournament organised by the Asian Volleyball Confederation (AVC), in that year with the Thailand Volleyball Association (TVA). The tournament was held in Nakhon Pathom, Thailand, from 24 to 29 June 2022.

== Team ==
=== Qualification ===
Following the AVC regulations, The maximum of 16 teams in all AVC events will be selected by:

- 1 team for the host country
- 10 teams based on the final standing of the previous edition
- 5 teams from each of 5 zones (with a qualification tournament if needed)

=== Qualified teams ===
As there was no tournament held from the first 2 editions, the following teams qualified for the tournament, not included the host Thailand U20 who participated for the 21st Princess Cup Volleyball Championship only. Later Mongolia, New Zealand and Sri Lanka withdraw from the tournament.

| Country | Zone | Qualified as | Qualified on | Previous appearances | | | Previous best performance |
| Country | Zone | Qualified as | Qualified on | Total | First | Last | Previous best performance |
|---|---|---|---|---|---|---|---|
| Hong Kong | EAZVA | 1st EAZVA team | 2 February 2022 | 0 | None | | None |
| India | CAZVA | 1st CAZVA team | 2 February 2022 | 0 | None | | None |
| Malaysia | SEAZVA | 1st SEAZVA team | 2 February 2022 | 0 | None | | None |
| ~~Mongolia~~ | ~~EAZVA~~ | ~~2nd EAZVA team~~ | ~~2 February 2022~~ | ~~0~~ | ~~None~~ | | ~~None~~ |
| ~~New Zealand~~ | ~~OZVA~~ | ~~1st OZVA team~~ | ~~2 February 2022~~ | ~~0~~ | ~~None~~ | | ~~None~~ |
| ~~Sri Lanka~~ | ~~CAZVA~~ | ~~2nd CAZVA team~~ | ~~2 February 2022~~ | ~~0~~ | ~~None~~ | | ~~None~~ |
| Uzbekistan | CAZVA | 3rd CAZVA team | 2 February 2022 | 0 | None | | None |
| Singapore | SEAZVA | 2nd SEAZVA team | 21 June 2022 | 0 | None | | None |

== Pool standing procedure ==
1. Total number of victories (matches won, matches lost)
2. In the event of a tie, the following first tiebreaker will apply: The teams will be ranked by the most point gained per match as follows:
  - Match won 3–0 or 3–1: 3 points for the winner, 0 points for the loser
  - Match won 3–2: 2 points for the winner, 1 point for the loser
  - Match forfeited: 3 points for the winner, 0 points (0–25, 0–25, 0–25) for the loser
3. If teams are still tied after examining the number of victories and points gained, then the AVC will examine the results in order to break the tie in the following order:
  - Set quotient: if two or more teams are tied on the number of points gained, they will be ranked by the quotient resulting from the division of the number of all set won by the number of all sets lost.
  - Points quotient: if the tie persists based on the set quotient, the teams will be ranked by the quotient resulting from the division of all points scored by the total of points lost during all sets.
  - If the tie persists based on the point quotient, the tie will be broken based on the team that won the match of the Round Robin Phase between the tied teams. When the tie in point quotient is between three or more teams, these teams ranked taking into consideration only the matches involving the teams in question.

== Squads ==
The full list of team squads were announced on the competition daily bulletin.

== Results ==
- All times are Indochina Time (UTC+07:00)

=== Ranking of the 3rd Asian Women's Volleyball Challenge Cup ===
| Pos | Team | Pld | W | L | Pts | SW | SL | SR | SPW | SPL | SPR |
|---|---|---|---|---|---|---|---|---|---|---|---|
| 1 | Hong Kong | 4 | 4 | 0 | 11 | 12 | 2 | 6.000 | 325 | 242 | 1.343 |
| 2 | India | 4 | 3 | 1 | 10 | 11 | 3 | 3.667 | 313 | 238 | 1.315 |
| 3 | Malaysia | 4 | 2 | 2 | 5 | 6 | 8 | 0.750 | 301 | 311 | 0.968 |
| 4 | Uzbekistan | 4 | 1 | 3 | 4 | 5 | 9 | 0.556 | 261 | 309 | 0.845 |
| 5 | Singapore | 4 | 0 | 4 | 0 | 0 | 12 | 0.000 | 200 | 300 | 0.667 |

=== Ranking of the Princess Cup Volleyball Championship ===
| Pos | Team | Pld | W | L | Pts | SW | SL | SR | SPW | SPL | SPR |
|---|---|---|---|---|---|---|---|---|---|---|---|
| 1 | Thailand U20 (H) | 5 | 5 | 0 | 13 | 15 | 4 | 3.750 | 442 | 324 | 1.364 |
| 2 | Hong Kong | 5 | 4 | 1 | 11 | 12 | 5 | 2.400 | 378 | 317 | 1.192 |
| 3 | India | 5 | 3 | 2 | 11 | 13 | 6 | 2.167 | 410 | 344 | 1.192 |
| 4 | Malaysia | 5 | 2 | 3 | 6 | 8 | 11 | 0.727 | 398 | 422 | 0.943 |
| 5 | Uzbekistan | 5 | 1 | 4 | 4 | 5 | 12 | 0.417 | 296 | 384 | 0.771 |
| 6 | Singapore | 5 | 0 | 5 | 0 | 0 | 15 | 0.000 | 242 | 375 | 0.645 |

(H) Host

| Date | Time | | Score | | Set 1 | Set 2 | Set 3 | Set 4 | Set 5 | Total | Report |
|---|---|---|---|---|---|---|---|---|---|---|---|
| 24 Jun | 12:00 | Uzbekistan | 2–3 | Malaysia | 25–23 | 25–21 | 16–25 | 16–25 | 11–15 | 93–109 | Report |
| 24 Jun | 14:30 | India | 3–0 | Singapore | 25–16 | 25–19 | 25–8 | | | 75–43 | Report |
| 24 Jun | 17:00 | Thailand U20 | 3–0 | Hong Kong | 25–19 | 25–23 | 25–11 | | | 75–53 | Report |
| 25 Jun | 12:00 | Uzbekistan | 0–3 | India | 16–25 | 13–25 | 16–25 | | | 45–75 | Report |
| 25 Jun | 14:30 | Hong Kong | 3–0 | Malaysia | 25–18 | 25–16 | 30–28 | | | 80–62 | Report |
| 25 Jun | 17:00 | Thailand U20 | 3–0 | Singapore | 25–15 | 25–14 | 25–13 | | | 75–42 | Report |
| 26 Jun | 12:00 | Malaysia | 0–3 | India | 17–25 | 16–25 | 22–25 | | | 55–75 | Report |
| 26 Jun | 14:30 | Singapore | 0–3 | Hong Kong | 13–25 | 15–25 | 16–25 | | | 44–75 | Report |
| 26 Jun | 17:00 | Thailand U20 | 3–0 | Uzbekistan | 25–11 | 25–16 | 25–8 | | | 75–35 | Report |
| 28 Jun | 12:00 | Singapore | 0–3 | Uzbekistan | 19–25 | 11–25 | 20–25 | | | 50–75 | Report |
| 28 Jun | 14:30 | Hong Kong | 3–2 | India | 12–25 | 18–25 | 25–13 | 25–19 | 15–6 | 95–88 | Report |
| 28 Jun | 17:00 | Malaysia | 2–3 | Thailand U20 | 19–25 | 27–25 | 25–21 | 15–25 | 11–15 | 97–111 | Report |
| 29 Jun | 12:00 | Uzbekistan | 0–3 | Hong Kong | 19–25 | 10–25 | 19–25 | | | 48–75 | |
| 29 Jun | 14:30 | Singapore | 0–3 | Malaysia | 23–25 | 21–25 | 19–25 | | | 63–75 | |
| 29 Jun | 17:00 | India | 2–3 | Thailand U20 | 25–23 | 12–25 | 22–25 | 25–18 | 13–15 | 97–106 | |

== Final standing ==
| Rank | Team |
|---|---|
| 1st place, gold medalist(s) | Hong Kong |
| 2nd place, silver medalist(s) | India |
| 3rd place, bronze medalist(s) | Malaysia |
| 4 | Uzbekistan |
| 5 | Singapore |

2022 Asian Challenge Cup champions

Hong Kong
First title

14–woman roster
Cheung Hiu Nok Michelle, Law Ho Fung Thyllis, Fung Tsz Yan, Yick Wing Sum, Lau Ho Ting, Yeung Sau Mei, Chim Wing Lam (c), Lo Mei Kei, Pang Wing Lam, Yu Ying Chi, Chan Ming Wai, Wong Sze Wing, To Wing Man, Ngai Kwai Ting
Head coach
Kwok Kin Chuen

== Awards ==
- Most valuable player
  Chim Wing Lam (HKG)
- Best setter
  Jini K.S (IND)
- Best outside spikers
  Low Mei Cing (MAS)
  Pang Wing Lam (HKG)
- Best middle blocker
  Ngin Jia Ning (MAS)
  Lau Ho Ting (HKG)
- Best opposite spiker
  Saranya N.S (IND)
- Best libero
  Aswathi R. (IND)

== See also ==
- 2022 Asian Women's Volleyball Cup
