= Võ Thị Kim Thoa =

Vietnamese volleyball player

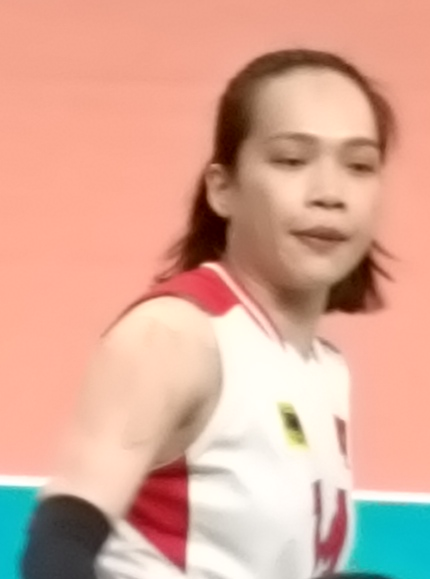
- Kim Thoa in 2025

Personal information
- Full name: Võ Thị Kim Thoa
- Nickname: Beo
- Nationality: Vietnam
- Born: March 18, 1998 (age 28) Long An, Vietnam
- Height: 1.73 m (5 ft 8 in)
- Weight: 71 kg (157 lb)
- Spike: 284 cm (9 ft 4 in)
- Block: 270 cm (8 ft 10 in)

Volleyball information
- Position: Setter
- Current club: (Vietnam) VTV Bình Điền Long An
- Number: 14 (National team and club)

Career
- Years: Team
- 2012–present: (Vietnam) VTV Bình Điền Long An
- 2023: (Vietnam) Sport Center 1 (selected team)

National team
- Years: Team
- 2022–present: Vietnam
Honours
Women's volleyball
Representing Vietnam
Challenger Cup
Bronze medal – third place	2024 Manila	Team
AVC Cup
Gold medal – first place	2023 Gresik	Team
Gold medal – first place	2024 Manila	Team
Gold medal – first place	2025 Hanoi	Team
Bronze medal – third place	2026 Candon	Team
Southeast Asian Games
Silver medal – second place	2023 Phnom Penh	Team
Silver medal – second place	2025 Bangkok	Team
SEA V Cup
Gold medal – first place	2025 Ninh Bình	Team
Silver medal – second place	2022 Nakhon Ratchasima	Team
Silver medal – second place	2023 Vĩnh Phúc / Chiang Mai	Team
Silver medal – second place	2024 Vĩnh Phúc / Nakhon Ratchasima	Team
Silver medal – second place	2025 Nakhon Ratchasima	Team
Silver medal – second place	2026 Hanoi	Team

Võ Thị Kim Thoa (born March 18, 1998) is a Vietnamese volleyball player. She is a member of Vietnam women's national volleyball team and VTV Bình Điền Long An volleyball club.

== Clubs ==
- (Vietnam) VTV Bình Điền Long An (2012 – )
- (Vietnam) Sport Center 1 (2023) (selected team)

== Career ==
=== National teams ===
- 2022 Asian Cup — 4th Place
- 2022 ASEAN Grand Prix — Runner-up
- 2023 SEA Games — Silver Medal
- 2023 Asian Challenge Cup — Champion
- 2023 FIVB Challenger Cup — 8th Place
- 2023 SEA V.League — Runner-up
- 2023 Asian Championship — 4th Place
- 2022 Asian Games — 4th Place
- 2024 Asian Challenge Cup — Champion
- 2024 FIVB Challenger Cup — 3rd Place
- 2024 SEA V.League — Runner-up
- 2025 Asian Nations Cup — Champion
- 2025 SEA V.League – First Leg — Runner-up
- 2025 SEA V.League – Second Leg — Champion
- 2025 World Championship — 31st Place
- 2025 SEA Games — Silver Medal
- 2026 AVC Cup — 3rd Place
- 2026 SEA V Cup – First Leg — Runner-up
- 2026 SEA V Cup – Second Leg — 4th Place
- 2026 Asian Championship — 7th Place
- 2026 Asian Games — 7th Place

=== Clubs ===
- 2017 Vietnam League – Champion, with VTV Bình Điền Long An
- 2018 Vietnam League – Champion, with VTV Bình Điền Long An
- 2022 Vietnam League – 3rd Place, with VTV Bình Điền Long An
- 2023 Vietnam League – 3rd Place, with VTV Bình Điền Long An
- 2023 Asian Club Championship – Champion, with Sport Center 1
- 2024 Vietnam League – Champion, with VTV Bình Điền Long An
- 2025 AVC Champions League – Runner-up, with VTV Bình Điền Long An
- 2025 Vietnam League – Champion, with VTV Bình Điền Long An
- 2026 Vietnam League – 3rd Place, with VTV Bình Điền Long An

== Awards ==
- 2022 Vietnam League "Best setter"
- 2023 Vietnam League "Best setter"
- 2024 Vietnam League "Best setter"
- 2025 Vietnam League "Best setter"
- 2026 VTV9 - Binh Dien International Cup "Best setter"
- 2026 AVC Cup "Best setter"
