= Đoàn Thị Lâm Oanh =

Vietnamese volleyball player (born 1998)

Personal information
- Full name: Đoàn Thị Lâm Oanh
- Nationality: Vietnam
- Born: July 6, 1998 (age 28) Quảng Bình, Vietnam
- Height: 1.77 m (5 ft 10 in)
- Spike: 289 cm (9 ft 6 in)
- Block: 285 cm (9 ft 4 in)

Volleyball information
- Position: Setter
- Current club: (Vietnam) Bộ Tư lệnh Thông tin
- Number: 19

National team
- Years: Team
- 2014 – 2015 2014 – 2016 2017 – 2019 2019 –: U18 Vietnam; U20 Vietnam; U23 Vietnam; Vietnam
Honours
Challenger Cup
Bronze medal – third place	2024 Manila	Team
Asian Nations Cup
Gold medal – first place	2023 Gresik	Team
Gold medal – first place	2024 Manila	Team
Gold medal – first place	2025 Hanoi	Team
Southeast Asian Games
Silver medal – second place	2019 Pasig	Team
Silver medal – second place	2021 Quảng Ninh	Team
Silver medal – second place	2023 Phnom Penh	Team
Silver medal – second place	2025 Bangkok	Team
SEA V.League
Gold medal – first place	2025 Ninh Bình	Team
Silver medal – second place	2022 Nakhon Ratchasima	Team
Silver medal – second place	2023 Vĩnh Phúc	Team
Silver medal – second place	2024 Vĩnh Phúc / Nakhon Ratchasima	Team
Silver medal – second place	2025 Nakhon Ratchasima	Team
Representing Vietnam U23
Asian Championship
Bronze medal – third place	2017 Nakhon Ratchasima	Team
Bronze medal – third place	2019 Hanoi	Team

Đoàn Thị Lâm Oanh (born July 6, 1998) is a Vietnamese volleyball player. She is a member of Vietnam women's national volleyball team and Bộ Tư lệnh Thông tin.

== Clubs ==
- (Vietnam) Bộ Tư lệnh Thông tin (2016–)
- (Vietnam) Sport Center 1 (2023) (selected team)
- (Thailand) Supreme TIP (Dhiphaya) Chonburi–E.Tech (2023–2024) (loan)

== Career ==
=== National team ===
==== Senior team ====
- 2019 ASEAN Grand Prix — 4th Place
- 2019 SEA Games — Silver Medal
- 2021 SEA Games — Silver Medal
- 2022 Asian Cup — 4th Place
- 2022 ASEAN Grand Prix — Runner-up
- 2023 SEA Games — Silver Medal
- 2023 Asian Challenge Cup — Champion
- 2023 FIVB Challenger Cup — 8th Place
- 2023 SEA V.League – First Leg — Runner-up
- 2023 Asian Championship — 4th Place
- 2022 Asian Games — 4th Place
- 2024 Asian Challenge Cup — Champion
- 2024 FIVB Challenger Cup — 3rd Place
- 2024 SEA V.League — Runner-up
- 2025 Asian Nations Cup — Champion
- 2025 SEA V.League – First Leg — Runner-up
- 2025 SEA V.League – Second Leg — Champion
- 2025 World Championship — 31st Place
- 2025 SEA Games — Silver Medal

==== U23 team ====
- 2017 Asian Championship - 3rd Place
- 2019 Asian Peace Cup — Champion
- 2019 Asian Championship - 3rd Place

=== Clubs ===
- 2016 Vietnam League - Runner-Up, with Thông tin LienVietPostBank
- 2017 Vietnam League - Runner-Up, with Thông tin LienVietPostBank
- 2018 Vietnam League - Runner-Up, with Thông tin LienVietPostBank
- 2019 Vietnam League - Champion, with Thông tin LienVietPostBank
- 2020 Vietnam League - Champion, with Thông tin LienVietPostBank
- 2021 Vietnam League - Champion, with Bộ Tư lệnh Thông tin - FLC
- 2023 Asian Club Championship – Champion, with Sport Center 1
- 2025 Vietnam League – 3rd Place, with Binh chủng Thông tin - Binh Đoàn 19
- 2026 Vietnam League – Champion, with Binh chủng Thông tin - Binh Đoàn 19

== Awards ==
- 2021 Vietnam League "Best setter"
- 2023 Asian Challenge Cup "Best setter"
- 2023 SEA V.League – First Leg "Best setter"
- 2023 VTV Cup "Best setter"
