= Lê Thanh Thúy =

Vietnamese volleyball player (born 1995)

Personal information
- Full name: Lê Thanh Thúy
- Nationality: Vietnam
- Born: May 23, 1995 (age 31) Hải Phòng, Vietnam
- Height: 1.80 m (5 ft 11 in)
- Weight: 62 kg (137 lb)
- Spike: 305 cm (10 ft 0 in)
- Block: 302 cm (9 ft 11 in)

Volleyball information
- Position: Middle blocker
- Current club: (Vietnam) Hà Nội Tasco Auto
- Number: 8 (National team and club)

Career
- Years: Team
- 2005 – 2011: (Vietnam) Hà Nội VC
- 2012 – 2013: (Vietnam) Vietsov Petro
- 2014 – 2021: (Vietnam) Vietinbank VC
- 2022 – 2025: (Vietnam) LP Bank Ninh Bình
- 2026 – present: (Vietnam) Hà Nội Tasco Auto

National team
- Years: Team
- 2014 – 2018, 2023 – present: Vietnam
Honours
Women's volleyball
Representing Vietnam
Challenger Cup
Bronze medal – third place	2024 Manila	Team
AVC Cup
Gold medal – first place	2024 Manila	Team
Gold medal – first place	2025 Hanoi	Team
Bronze medal – third place	2026 Candon	Team
Southeast Asian Games
Silver medal – second place	2015 Singapore	Team
Silver medal – second place	2025 Bangkok	Team
Bronze medal – third place	2017 Kuala Lumpur	Team
SEA V Cup
Gold medal – first place	2025 Ninh Bình	Team
Silver medal – second place	2023 Chiang Mai	Team
Silver medal – second place	2024 Vĩnh Phúc / Nakhon Ratchasima	Team
Silver medal – second place	2025 Nakhon Ratchasima	Team
Silver medal – second place	2026 Hanoi	Team

Lê Thanh Thúy (born May 23, 1995) is a Vietnamese volleyball player. She is a member of Vietnam women's national volleyball team and Hà Nội Tasco Auto volleyball club.

== Clubs ==
- (Vietnam) Hà Nội VC (2005 – 2011)
- (Vietnam) Vietsov Petro (2012 – 2013)
- (Vietnam) Vietinbank VC (2014 – 2021)
- (Vietnam) LP Bank Ninh Bình (2022 – 2025)
- (Vietnam) Hà Nội Tasco Auto (2026 – )

== Career ==
=== National teams ===
- 2014 Asian Cup — 8th Place
- 2015 Asian Championship — 5th Place
- 2015 SEA Games — Silver Medal
- 2016 Asian Cup — 7th Place
- 2017 Asian Championship — 5th Place
- 2017 SEA Games — Bronze Medal
- 2018 Asian Games — 6th Place
- 2018 Asian Cup — 5th Place
- 2023 SEA V.League – Second Leg — Runner-up
- 2024 Asian Challenge Cup — Champion
- 2024 FIVB Challenger Cup — 3rd Place
- 2024 SEA V.League — Runner-up
- 2025 Asian Nations Cup — Champion
- 2025 SEA V.League – First Leg — Runner-up
- 2025 SEA V.League – Second Leg — Champion
- 2025 World Championship — 31st Place
- 2025 SEA Games — Silver Medal
- 2026 AVC Cup — 3rd Place
- 2026 SEA V Cup – First Leg — Runner-up
- 2026 Asian Championship — 7th Place
- 2026 Asian Games — 7th Place

=== Clubs ===
- 2013 Vietnam League - 3rd Place, with Vietsov Petro
- 2014 Vietnam League - 3rd Place, with Vietinbank VC
- 2015 Vietnam League - Runner-up, with Vietinbank VC
- 2016 Vietnam League - Champion, with Vietinbank VC
- 2017 Vietnam League - 3rd Place, with Vietinbank VC
- 2018 Vietnam League - 3rd Place, with Vietinbank VC
- 2019 Vietnam League - Runner-up, with Vietinbank VC
- 2023 Vietnam League - Champion, with LP Bank Ninh Bình
- 2024 Asian Club Championship – Runner-up, with LP Bank Ninh Bình
- 2024 Vietnam League - 3rd Place, with LP Bank Ninh Bình
- 2025 Vietnam League - Runner-up, with LP Bank Ninh Bình
- 2026 Vietnam League - Runner-up, with Hà Nội Tasco Auto

== Awards ==
- 2014 VTV Binh Dien International Cup "Miss Volleyball"
- 2014 VTV International Cup "Miss Volleyball"
- 2016 VTV International Cup "Best middle blocker"
- 2023 VTV International Cup "Best middle blocker"
- 2024 Asian Challenge Cup "Best middle blocker"
