= 2024 SEA Women's V.League – Second Leg =

Southeast Asian volleyball tournament

Tournament details
- Host country: Thailand
- City: Nakhon Ratchasima
- Dates: 9–11 August
- Teams: 4 (from 1 confederation)
- Venue: 1 (in 1 host city)

Final positions
- Champions: Thailand (7th title)
- Runners-up: Vietnam
- Third place: Philippines
- Fourth place: Indonesia

Tournament statistics
- Matches played: 6

The 2024 SEA Women's V.League – Second Leg was contested by four national teams that are the members of the Southeast Asian Volleyball Association (SEAVA), the sport's regional governing body affiliated to Asian Volleyball Confederation (AVC). The matches were played at Nakhon Ratchasima, Thailand.

== Teams ==
- Indonesia
- Philippines
- Thailand
- Vietnam

== Venue ==
All matches
Nakhon Ratchasima, Thailand
Korat Chatchai Hall
Capacity: 5,000
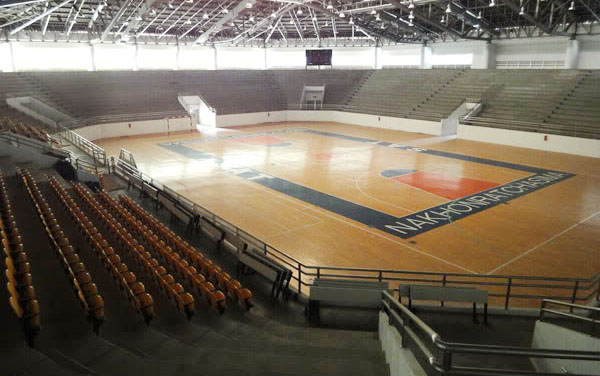

== Pool standing procedure ==
1. Total number of victories (matches won, matched lost)
2. In the event of a tie, the following first tiebreaker was to apply: The teams was to be ranked by the most point gained per match as follows:
  - Match won 3–0 or 3–1: 3 points for the winner, 0 points for the loser
  - Match won 3–2: 2 points for the winner, 1 point for the loser
  - Match forfeited: 3 points for the winner, 0 points (0–25, 0–25, 0–25) for the loser

== League results ==
- All times are Indochina Time (UTC+07:00).

Pos	Team	Pld	W	L	Pts	SW	SL	SR	SPW	SPL	SPR
1	Thailand (H)	3	3	0	9	9	1	9.000	244	196	1.245
2	Vietnam	3	2	1	6	7	4	1.750	244	234	1.043
3	Philippines	3	1	2	2	3	8	0.375	206	250	0.824
4	Indonesia	3	0	3	1	3	9	0.333	242	266	0.910

Source: SEA VLeague
(H) Host

Date	Time		Score		Set 1	Set 2	Set 3	Set 4	Set 5	Total	Report
9 Aug	15:00	Vietnam	3–1	Indonesia	25–15	15–25	25–21	25–21		90–82	
9 Aug	18:00	Thailand	3–0	Philippines	25–18	25–23	25–16			75–57	
10 Aug	15:00	Vietnam	3–0	Philippines	25–16	25–20	25–22			75–58	
10 Aug	18:00	Thailand	3–0	Indonesia	25–15	25–22	25–23			75–60	
11 Aug	15:00	Philippines	3–2	Indonesia	20–25	25–20	16–25	25–20	15–10	101–100	
11 Aug	18:00	Thailand	3–1	Vietnam	25–22	25–17	19–25	25–15		94–79	

== Final standing ==
Rank	Team
1st place, gold medalist(s)	Thailand
2nd place, silver medalist(s)	Vietnam
3rd place, bronze medalist(s)	Philippines
4	Indonesia

2024 SEA Women's V.League – Second Leg champions

Thailand
7th title

14–woman roster
Wipawee Srithong, Piyanut Pannoy, Pornpun Guedpard, Donphon Sinpho, Thatdao Nuekjang (c), Nichakorn Wansuk, Sasipapron Janthawisut, Hattaya Bamrungsuk, Natthanicha Jaisaen, Pimpichaya Kokram, Ajcharaporn Kongyot, Chatchu-on Moksri, Thanacha Sooksod, Wimonrat Thanapan
Head coach
Nataphon Srisamutnak

== Awards ==
- Most valuable player
  Chatchu-on Moksri (THA)
- Best setter
  Pornpun Guedpard (THA)
- Best outside spikers
  Chatchu-on Moksri (THA)
  Vi Thị Như Quỳnh (VIE)
- Best middle blockers
  Thatdao Nuekjang (THA)
  Wilda Nurfadhilah (INA)
- Best opposite spiker
  Alyssa Solomon (PHI)
- Best libero
  Nguyễn Khánh Đang (VIE)
