= Vi Thị Như Quỳnh =

Vietnamese volleyball player

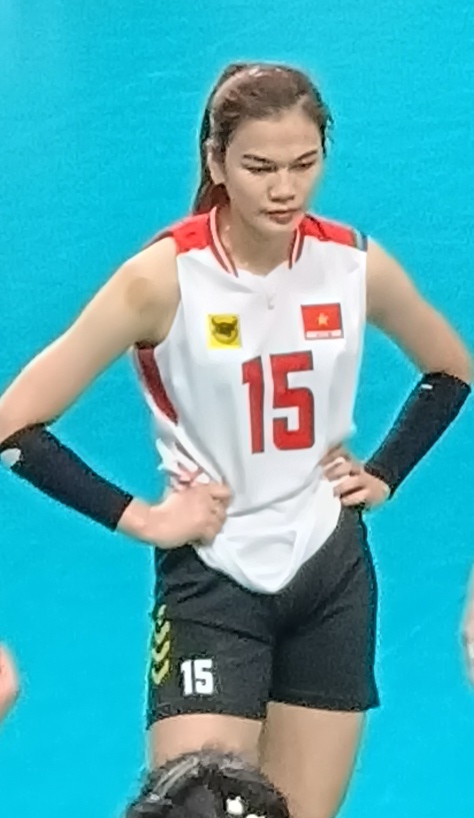
- Như Quỳnh in 2025

Personal information
- Full name: Vi Thị Như Quỳnh
- Nationality: Vietnam
- Born: April 16, 2002 (age 24) Tương Dương, Nghệ An, Vietnam
- Height: 1.75 m (5 ft 9 in)
- Weight: 70 kg (154 lb)
- Spike: 321 cm (10 ft 6 in)
- Block: 305 cm (10 ft 0 in)

Volleyball information
- Position: Outside hitter
- Current club: (Vietnam) Hà Nội Tasco Auto
- Number: 16 (National team and club)

Career
- Years: Team
- 2017–2020, 2025: (Vietnam) Vietinbank VC
- 2021–2025: (Vietnam) Than Quảng Ninh VC
- 2023: (Vietnam) Sport Center 1 (select team)
- 2024: (Vietnam) Bộ Tư lệnh Thông tin (loan)
- 2025: (Vietnam) VTV Bình Điền Long An (loan)
- 2025–2026: (Indonesia) Medan Falcons
- 2026–present: (Vietnam) Hà Nội Tasco Auto

National team
- Years: Team
- 2022–present: Vietnam
Honours
Women's volleyball
Representing Vietnam
Challenger Cup
Bronze medal – third place	2024 Manila	Team
Asian Nations Cup
Gold medal – first place	2023 Gresik	Team
Gold medal – first place	2024 Manila	Team
Gold medal – first place	2025 Hanoi	Team
Bronze medal – third place	2026 Candon	Team
Southeast Asian Games
Silver medal – second place	2023 Phnom Penh	Team
Silver medal – second place	2025 Bangkok	Team
SEA V Cup
Gold medal – first place	2025 Ninh Bình	Team
Silver medal – second place	2022 Nakhon Ratchasima	Team
Silver medal – second place	2023 Vĩnh Phúc / Chiang Mai	Team
Silver medal – second place	2024 Vĩnh Phúc / Nakhon Ratchasima	Team
Silver medal – second place	2025 Nakhon Ratchasima	Team
Silver medal – second place	2026 Hanoi	Team

Vi Thị Như Quỳnh (born April 16, 2002) is a Vietnamese volleyball player. She is a member of Vietnam women's national volleyball team and Hà Nội Tasco Auto volleyball club.

== Clubs ==
- (Vietnam) Vietinbank VC (2017 – 2020, 2025)
- (Vietnam) Than Quảng Ninh VC (2021 – 2025)
- (Vietnam) Sport Center 1 (2023) (selected team)
- (Vietnam) Bộ Tư lệnh Thông tin (2024) (loan)
- (Vietnam) VTV Bình Điền Long An (2025) (loan)
- (Indonesia) Medan Falcons (2025 – 2026)
- (Vietnam) Hà Nội Tasco Auto (2026 – )

== Career ==
=== National teams ===
- 2022 Asian Cup — 4th Place
- 2022 ASEAN Grand Prix — Runner-up
- 2023 SEA Games — Silver Medal
- 2023 Asian Challenge Cup — Champion
- 2023 FIVB Challenger Cup — 8th Place
- 2023 SEA V.League — Runner-up
- 2023 Asian Championship — 4th Place
- 2022 Asian Games — 4th Place
- 2024 Asian Challenge Cup — Champion
- 2024 FIVB Challenger Cup — 3rd Place
- 2024 SEA V.League — Runner-up
- 2025 Asian Nations Cup — Champion
- 2025 SEA V.League – First Leg — Runner-up
- 2025 SEA V.League – Second Leg — Champion
- 2025 World Championship — 31st Place
- 2025 SEA Games — Silver Medal
- 2026 AVC Cup — 3rd Place
- 2026 SEA V Cup – First Leg — Runner-up

=== Clubs ===
- 2019 Vietnam League – Runner-up, with Vietinbank VC
- 2021 Vietnam League – 3rd Place, with Than Quảng Ninh VC
- 2023 Asian Club Championship – Champion, with Sport Center 1
- 2025 AVC Champions League – Runner-up, with VTV Bình Điền Long An

== Awards ==
- 2023 SEA V.League – Second Leg "Best outside hitter"
- 2024 VTV9 - Binh Dien International Cup "Best outside hitter"
- 2024 SEA V.League – Second Leg "Best outside hitter"
- 2025 AVC Champions League "Best outside hitter"
- 2025 SEA V.League – Second Leg "Best outside hitter"
- 2026 VTV9 - Binh Dien International Cup "Best outside hitter"
- 2026 SEA V Cup – First Leg "Best outside hitter"
