= Trần Thị Bích Thủy =

Vietnamese volleyball player

Personal information
- Full name: Trần Thị Bích Thủy
- Nickname: Mira
- Nationality: Vietnam
- Born: December 11, 2000 (age 25) Hanoi, Vietnam
- Height: 1.84 m (6 ft 0 in)
- Weight: 70 kg (154 lb)
- Spike: 303 cm (9 ft 11 in)
- Block: 297 cm (9 ft 9 in)

Volleyball information
- Position: Middle blocker
- Current club: (Vietnam) Đức Giang Chemical
- Number: 26 (National team and club)

Career
- Years: Team
- 2013 – 2016: (Vietnam) Hà Nội VC
- 2017 – present: (Vietnam) Đức Giang Chemical
- 2018 – 2019: (Thailand) Quint Air Force (loan)
- 2023: (Vietnam) Sport Center 1 (selected team)
- 2024 – 2025: (South Korea) GS Caltex Seoul Kixx (loan)
- 2025 – 2026: (Japan) Okayama Seagulls (loan)

National team
- Years: Team
- 2019 – present 2019 2017 – 2018: Vietnam; Vietnam U23; Vietnam U20
Honours
Women's volleyball
Representing Vietnam
AVC Cup
Gold medal – first place	2023 Gresik	Team
Gold medal – first place	2025 Hanoi	Team
Bronze medal – third place	2026 Candon	Team
Southeast Asian Games
Silver medal – second place	2019 Pasig	Team
Silver medal – second place	2021 Quảng Ninh	Team
Silver medal – second place	2023 Phnom Penh	Team
Silver medal – second place	2025 Bangkok	Team
SEA V Cup
Gold medal – first place	2025 Ninh Bình	Team
Silver medal – second place	2022 Nakhon Ratchasima	Team
Silver medal – second place	2023 Vĩnh Phúc / Chiang Mai	Team
Silver medal – second place	2025 Nakhon Ratchasima	Team
Silver medal – second place	2026 Hanoi	Team
Representing Vietnam U23
Asian Championship
Bronze medal – third place	2019 Hanoi	Team

Trần Thị Bích Thủy (born December 11, 2000) is a Vietnamese volleyball player. She is a member of Vietnam women's national volleyball team and Đức Giang Chemical volleyball club.

== Clubs ==
- (Vietnam) Hà Nội VC (2013 – 2016)
- (Vietnam) Đức Giang Chemical (2017 – )
- (Thailand) Quint Air Force (2018 – 2019) (loan)
- (Vietnam) Sport Center 1 (2023) (selected team)
- (South Korea) GS Caltex Seoul Kixx (2024 – 2025) (loan)
- (Japan) Okayama Seagulls (2025 – 2026) (loan)

== Career ==
=== National teams ===
==== Senior team ====
- 2019 ASEAN Grand Prix — 4th Place
- 2019 SEA Games — Silver Medal
- 2021 SEA Games — Silver Medal
- 2022 Asian Cup — 4th Place
- 2022 ASEAN Grand Prix — Runner-up
- 2023 SEA Games — Silver Medal
- 2023 Asian Challenge Cup — Champion
- 2023 FIVB Challenger Cup — 8th Place
- 2023 SEA V.League — Runner-up
- 2023 Asian Championship — 4th Place
- 2022 Asian Games — 4th Place
- 2025 Asian Nations Cup — Champion
- 2025 SEA V.League – First Leg — Runner-up
- 2025 SEA V.League – Second Leg — Champion
- 2025 World Championship — 31st Place
- 2025 SEA Games — Silver Medal
- 2026 AVC Cup — 3rd Place
- 2026 SEA V Cup – First Leg — Runner-up
- 2026 SEA V Cup – Second Leg — 4th Place
- 2026 Asian Championship — 7th Place
- 2026 Asian Games — 7th Place

==== U23 team ====
- 2019 Asian Peace Cup — Champion
- 2019 Asian Championship — 3rd Place

==== U20 Team ====
- 2018 Asian Championship — 6th Place

=== Clubs ===
- 2020 Vietnam League – Runner-up, with Đức Giang Chemical
- 2021 Vietnam League – Runner-up, with Đức Giang Chemical
- 2022 Vietnam League – Runner-up, with Đức Giang Chemical
- 2023 Vietnam League – Runner-up, with Đức Giang Chemical
- 2023 Asian Club Championship – Champion, with Sport Center 1
- 2024 Vietnam League – Runner-up, with Đức Giang Chemical

== Awards ==
- 2018–19 Thailand League "Best middle blocker"
- 2025 SEA V.League – First Leg "Best middle blocker"
- 2025 SEA V.League – Second Leg "Best middle blocker"
- 2026 SEA V Cup – Second Leg "Best middle blocker"
