= 2024 SEA Women's V.League – First Leg =

Southeast Asian volleyball tournament

Tournament details
- Host country: Vietnam
- City: Vĩnh Phúc
- Dates: 2–4 August
- Teams: 4 (from 1 confederation)
- Venue: 1 (in 1 host city)

Final positions
- Champions: Thailand (6th title)
- Runners-up: Vietnam
- Third place: Philippines
- Fourth place: Indonesia

Tournament statistics
- Matches played: 6

The 2024 SEA Women's V.League – First Leg was contested by four national teams that are the members of the Southeast Asian Volleyball Association (SEAVA), the sport's regional governing body affiliated to Asian Volleyball Confederation (AVC). The matches were played at Vĩnh Phúc, Vietnam on 2–4 August 2024.

== Teams ==
- Indonesia
- Philippines
- Thailand
- Vietnam

== Venue ==
All matches
Vĩnh Phúc, Vietnam
Vĩnh Phúc Gymnasium
Capacity: 3,000

== Pool standing procedure ==
1. Total number of victories (matches won, matched lost)
2. In the event of a tie, the following first tiebreaker was to apply: The teams was to be ranked by the most point gained per match as follows:
  - Match won 3–0 or 3–1: 3 points for the winner, 0 points for the loser
  - Match won 3–2: 2 points for the winner, 1 point for the loser
  - Match forfeited: 3 points for the winner, 0 points (0–25, 0–25, 0–25) for the loser

== League results ==
- All times are Indochina Time (UTC+07:00).

Pos	Team	Pld	W	L	Pts	SW	SL	SR	SPW	SPL	SPR
1	Thailand	3	3	0	8	9	2	4.500	265	191	1.387
2	Vietnam (H)	3	2	1	7	8	4	2.000	276	261	1.057
3	Philippines	3	1	2	3	4	7	0.571	221	262	0.844
4	Indonesia	3	0	3	0	1	9	0.111	192	240	0.800

Source: SEA VLeague
(H) Host

Date	Time		Score		Set 1	Set 2	Set 3	Set 4	Set 5	Total	Report
2 Aug	16:00	Indonesia	0–3	Thailand	14–25	20–25	11–25			45–75	
2 Aug	19:00	Vietnam	3–1	Philippines	25–23	20–25	25–22	25–21		95–91	
3 Aug	16:00	Thailand	3–0	Philippines	25–12	25–18	25–10			75–40	
3 Aug	19:00	Indonesia	0–3	Vietnam	19–25	17–25	19–25			55–75	
4 Aug	16:00	Philippines	3–1	Indonesia	25–23	15–25	25–23	25–21		90–92	
4 Aug	19:00	Vietnam	2–3	Thailand	18–25	29–27	25–23	21–25	13–15	106–115	

== Final standing ==
Rank	Team
1st place, gold medalist(s)	Thailand
2nd place, silver medalist(s)	Vietnam
3rd place, bronze medalist(s)	Philippines
4	Indonesia

2024 SEA Women's V.League – First Leg champions

Thailand
6th title

14–woman roster
Piyanut Pannoy, Pornpun Guedpard, Donphon Sinpho, Thatdao Nuekjang (c), Jidapa Nahuanong, Sasipapron Janthawisut, Hattaya Bamrungsuk, Natthanicha Jaisaen, Pimpichaya Kokram, Ajcharaporn Kongyot, Chatchu-on Moksri, Thanacha Sooksod, Kuttika Kaewpin, Wimonrat Thanapan
Head coach
Nataphon Srisamutnak

== Awards ==
- Most valuable player
  Chatchu-on Moksri (THA)
- Best setter
  Jia De Guzman (PHI)
- Best outside spikers
  Ajcharaporn Kongyot (THA)
  Chatchu-on Moksri (THA)
- Best middle blockers
  Thea Gagate (PHI)
  Đinh Thị Trà Giang (VIE)
- Best opposite spiker
  Nguyễn Thị Bích Tuyền (VIE)
- Best libero
  Piyanut Pannoy (THA)
