= Volleyball at the 2023 SEA Games – Women's tournament =

Women's volleyball tournament at the 2023 SEA Games
- Venue: Olympic Complex Indoor Main Hall
- Dates: 9–14 May
- Nations: 8

Medalists
gold medal	Thailand
silver medal	Vietnam
bronze medal	Indonesia

The women's volleyball tournament at the 2023 SEA Games was held at the Olympic Complex Indoor Main Hall in Phnom Penh from 9 to 14 May 2023.

== Draw ==
The draw for the women's volleyball tournament was held on 5 April 2023 in Phnom Penh. Cambodia as host chose the group which it wanted to be allocated in.

== Participating nations ==
- Cambodia
- Indonesia
- Malaysia
- Myanmar
- Philippines
- Singapore
- Thailand
- Vietnam

=== Squads ===
Cambodia	Indonesia	Malaysia	Myanmar
Danet Moeurn; Borey Vann; Ravy Horm; Sopheavy Uy; Sochan Rorun; Thidajeannie Neth; Sreina Chhorurn; Theara Chhun; Makara Phay; Paolak Chhoeurn; Sineut Vi; Makara Kim; Sreyphea An; Molika Soeu	Yulis Indahyani; Ratri Wulandari; Megawati Hangestri Pertiwi; Arneta Putri Amelian; Nandita Ayu Salsabila; Hany Budiarti; Agustin Wulandhari; Wilda Nurfadhilah; Tisya Amallya Putri; Shintia Alliva Mauludina; Aulia Suci Nurfadilla; Mediol Stiovanny Yoku	Lee Wen Woey; Britney Tie Chan Xuan; Lum Lye Xin; Moh Sheau Jun; Yong Xien Nie; Lee Jie Ru; Low Mei Cing; Angela Tang Ling Hui; Janie Ling Sze Ting; Yong Jia Tian; Irene Siah Qi Min; Lim Wen Ni; Goh Chiao Huey	Hlaing Nan Myint Zu Thaka; Thae Su Mon; Phaw Ee Kree; Nandar Yu; Kalar Win; Wutt Ye Phyo Thae; Lay Kyu Kyu; Khin Cho Htet; Khaing Tha Zin Htwe; Nant Sandar Moe; Aung Thu Zar; Vung Sian San
Philippines	Singapore	Thailand	Vietnam
Glaudine Troncoso; Alyssa Valdez; Michele Gumabao; Mylene Paat; Bang Pineda; Kat Tolentino; Kyla Atienza; Jia de Guzman; Dell Palomata; Celine Domingo; Diana Mae Carlos; Cherry Nunag; Jema Galanza; Maria Angelica Cayuna	Nadja Kim Schmidt; Lee Pei Ying; Quek Soo Teng; Chan Yao Yi; Adeline Sim Shu Qi; Pua Le Jie; Lau Ee Shan; Rachel Lau Yue Ting; Jolyn Chua Xin Yi; Ethel Theresa Siow Yi Yin; Felicia Tan Sher Ning; Chua Zi Tian; Jolis Aw Xin Rui; Sofi Arini Binte Azni	Piyanut Pannoy; Thatdao Nuekjang; Warisara Seetaloed; Watchareeya Nuanjam; Khatthalee Pinsuwan; Hattaya Bamrungsuk; Soraya Phomla; Pimpichaya Kokram; Ajcharaporn Kongyot; Chatchu-on Moksri; Supattra Pairoj; Thanacha Sooksod; Sirima Manakij; Wimonrat Thanapan	Lê Thị Thanh Liên; Trần Thị Thanh Thúy; Phạm Thị Nguyệt Anh; Trần Thị Bích Thủy; Hoàng Thị Kiều Trinh; Nguyễn Khánh Đang; Võ Thị Kim Thoa; Nguyễn Thị Trinh; Vi Thị Như Quỳnh; Đoàn Thị Xuân; Đoàn Thị Lâm Oanh; Trần Tú Linh; Lý Thị Luyến; Đinh Thị Trà Giang

== Preliminary round ==
- All times are Cambodia Standard Time (UTC+07:00).

=== Group A ===
Pos	Team	Pld	W	L	Pts	SW	SL	SR	SPW	SPL	SPR	Qualification
1	Thailand	3	3	0	9	9	0	MAX	225	111	2.027	Semifinals
2	Indonesia	3	2	1	6	6	3	2.000	198	141	1.404	Semifinals
3	Malaysia	3	1	2	3	3	6	0.500	149	193	0.772	5th–8th semifinals
4	Myanmar	3	0	3	0	0	9	0.000	98	225	0.436	5th–8th semifinals

Date	Time		Score		Set 1	Set 2	Set 3	Set 4	Set 5	Total	Report
9 May	12:00	Malaysia	3–0	Myanmar	25–14	25–16	25–13			75–43	
9 May	17:00	Indonesia	0–3	Thailand	16–25	16–25	16–25			48–75	
10 May	12:00	Malaysia	0–3	Indonesia	12–25	9–25	12–25			33–75	
10 May	14:30	Myanmar	0–3	Thailand	8–25	8–25	6–25			22–75	
11 May	12:00	Indonesia	3–0	Myanmar	25–9	25–9	25–15			75–33	
11 May	14:30	Thailand	3–0	Malaysia	25–12	25–14	25–15			75–41	

=== Group B ===
Pos	Team	Pld	W	L	Pts	SW	SL	SR	SPW	SPL	SPR	Qualification
1	Vietnam	3	3	0	9	9	0	MAX	225	103	2.184	Semifinals
2	Philippines	3	2	1	6	6	3	2.000	206	134	1.537	Semifinals
3	Singapore	3	1	2	3	3	6	0.500	147	178	0.826	5th–8th semifinals
4	Cambodia (H)	3	0	3	0	0	9	0.000	62	225	0.276	5th–8th semifinals

(H) Host

Date	Time		Score		Set 1	Set 2	Set 3	Set 4	Set 5	Total	Report
9 May	14:30	Vietnam	3–0	Singapore	25–13	25–8	25–7			75–28	
9 May	19:30	Philippines	3–0	Cambodia	25–5	25–5	25–5			75–15	
10 May	17:00	Philippines	0–3	Vietnam	20–25	17–25	19–25			56–75	
10 May	19:30	Cambodia	0–3	Singapore	15–25	3–25	10–25			28–75	
11 May	17:00	Singapore	0–3	Philippines	17–25	14–25	13–25			44–75	
11 May	19:30	Vietnam	3–0	Cambodia	25–7	25–7	25–5			75–19	

== Final round ==
- All times are Cambodia Standard Time (UTC+07:00).

=== 5th–8th places ===
5th–8th semifinals
13 May
Malaysia	3
Cambodia (Note: Cambodia forfeited two matches on 13 and 14 May giving Malaysia and Myanmar a 3–0 win each.)	0
13 May
Singapore	3
Myanmar	2

5th place match
14 May
Malaysia	2
Singapore	3
7th place match
14 May
Cambodia	0
Myanmar	3

==== 5th–8th semifinals ====
Date	Time		Score		Set 1	Set 2	Set 3	Set 4	Set 5	Total	Report
13 May	12:00	Malaysia	3–0	Cambodia	25–0	25–0	25–0			75–0	
13 May	14:30	Singapore	3–2	Myanmar	25–20	23–25	22–25	25–21	15–10	110–101	

==== 7th place match ====
Date	Time		Score		Set 1	Set 2	Set 3	Set 4	Set 5	Total	Report
14 May	12:00	Cambodia	0–3	Myanmar	0–25	0–25	0–25			0–75	

==== 5th place match ====
Date	Time		Score		Set 1	Set 2	Set 3	Set 4	Set 5	Total	Report
14 May	14:30	Malaysia	2–3	Singapore	25–21	25–17	20–25	25–27	11–15	106–105	

=== Final four ===
Semifinals
13 May
Thailand	3
Philippines	0
13 May
Vietnam	3
Indonesia	2

Gold medal match
14 May
Thailand	3
Vietnam	1
Bronze medal match
14 May
Philippines	1
Indonesia	3

==== Semifinals ====
Date	Time		Score		Set 1	Set 2	Set 3	Set 4	Set 5	Total	Report
13 May	17:00	Thailand	3–0	Philippines	25–22	25–9	25–12			75–43	
13 May	19:30	Vietnam	3–2	Indonesia	21–25	25–15	16–25	25–22	15–12	102–99	

==== Bronze medal match ====
Date	Time		Score		Set 1	Set 2	Set 3	Set 4	Set 5	Total	Report
14 May	17:00	Philippines	1–3	Indonesia	20–25	25–22	22–25	23–25		90–97	

==== Gold medal match ====
Date	Time		Score		Set 1	Set 2	Set 3	Set 4	Set 5	Total	Report
14 May	19:30	Thailand	3–1	Vietnam	25–17	21–25	32–30	25–21		103–93	

== Final standings ==
Rank	Team
1st place, gold medalist(s)	Thailand
2nd place, silver medalist(s)	Vietnam
3rd place, bronze medalist(s)	Indonesia
4	Philippines
5	Singapore
6	Malaysia
7	Myanmar
8	Cambodia

== See also ==
- Volleyball at the 2023 SEA Games – Men's tournament
