= Lưu Thị Ly Ly =

Vietnamese volleyball player (born 1998)

Personal information
- Full name: Lưu Thị Ly Ly
- Born: October 20, 1998 (age 28); Ninh Bình, Vietnam
- Height: 1.69 m (5 ft 7 in)
- Spike: 281 cm (9 ft 3 in)
- Block: 275 cm (9 ft 0 in)

Volleyball information
- Position: Libero
- Current club: Bộ Tư lệnh Thông tin
- Number: 1

National team
2025; 2017; 2016 – 2017; 2014 – 2015	Vietnam; Vietnam U23; Vietnam U20; Vietnam U18
Honours
Women's volleyball
Representing Vietnam
Asian Nations Cup
Gold medal – first place	2025 Hanoi	Team
SEA V.League
Gold medal – first place	2025 Ninh Bình	Team
Silver medal – second place	2025 Nakhon Ratchasima	Team

Lưu Thị Ly Ly (born October 20, 1998) is a member of the Vietnam women's national volleyball team.

== Clubs ==
- (Vietnam) Bộ Tư lệnh Thông tin

== Awards ==
=== Clubs ===
- 2016 Vietnam League - Runner-up, with Thông tin LienVietPostBank
- 2017 Vietnam League - Runner-up, with Thông tin LienVietPostBank
- 2018 Vietnam League - Runner-up, with Thông tin LienVietPostBank
- 2019 Vietnam League - Champion, with Thông tin LienVietPostBank
- 2020 Vietnam League - Champion, with Thông tin LienVietPostBank
- 2021 Vietnam League - Champion, with Bộ Tư lệnh Thông tin - FLC
- 2025 Vietnam League – 3rd Place, with Binh chủng Thông tin - Binh Đoàn 19
- 2026 Vietnam League – Champion, with Binh chủng Thông tin - Binh Đoàn 19

=== National team ===
==== Senior team ====
- 2025 Asian Nations Cup — Champion
- 2025 SEA V.League – First Leg — Runner-up
- 2025 SEA V.League – Second Leg — Champion

==== U23 team ====
- 2017 Asian Championship — 3rd Place

==== U20 team ====
- 2016 ASEAN Championship — Runner-up
