= Volleyball at the 2025 SEA Games – Women's tournament =

Women's volleyball tournament at the 2025 SEA Games
- Venue: Indoor Stadium Huamark
- Dates: 10–15 December
- Competitors: 96 from 7 nations

Medalists
gold medal	Thailand
silver medal	Vietnam
bronze medal	Indonesia

The women's volleyball tournament at the 2025 SEA Games was held at the Indoor Stadium Huamark in Bangkok from 10 to 15 December 2025.

== Draw ==
The draw for the women's volleyball tournament was held on 19 October 2025 in Bangkok, Thailand.

Pool A	Pool B
Thailand	Vietnam
Philippines	Indonesia
Singapore	Myanmar
—N/a	Malaysia

== Participating nations ==
- Indonesia
- Malaysia
- Myanmar
- Philippines
- Singapore
- Thailand
- Vietnam

=== Squads ===
Indonesia	Malaysia	Myanmar	Philippines
Ajeng Nur Cahaya; Chelsa Berliana Nurtomo; Mediol Stiovanny Yoku; Yolana Betha Pangestika; Megawati Hangestri Pertiwi; Indah Guretno Dwi Margiani; Ersandrina Devega; Geofanny Eka Cahyaningtyas; Naisya Pratama Putri; Rika Dwi Latri; Pascalina Mahuze; Maradanti Namira Tegariana; Sulastri Rahma Aulia; Syelomitha Afrilaviza Injilia Wongkar	Lee Wen Woey; Lum Lye Xin; Lee Jie Ru; Pua Ee Ling; Lim Wen Ni; Chia Yun Lynn; Iona Tang Wy Ee; Yong Jia Tian; Yong Yi Hua; Irene Siah Qi Min; Ching Keen Swen; Goh Chiao Huey; Samantha Yong Xien Nie; Si Chee Ting	Hlaing Nan Myint Zu Thaka; Thae Su Mon; Phaw Ee Kree; Tin Sabal; Win Su Mon; Nandar Yu; Htet Khin Cho; Lay Naw Ma; Aung Thu Zar; Thae Wutt Ye Phyo; Lay Kyu Kyu; Htet Htet	Shaina Nitura; Vanie Gandler; Bella Belen; Dawn Macandili-Catindig; Julia Coronel; Maddie Madayag; Eya Laure; Jia de Guzman; Angel Canino; Dell Palomata; Alyssa Solomon; Justine Jazareno; Mars Alba; Amie Provido
Singapore	Thailand	Vietnam	
Nadja Kim Schmidt; Melanie Yong Yuchi; Natalie Lai Tzak Hshin; Chan Yao Yi; Chen Kaiting; Rachel Ng Min Yee; Fu Wenqi; Jolyn Chua Xin Yi; Ethel Theresa Siow Yi Yin; Felicia Tan Sher Ning; Tan Le Xuan; Gan Yun Jie; Jolis Aw Xin Rui; Raine Tan Yixuan	Kalyarat Khamwong; Piyanut Pannoy; Pornpun Guedpard; Thatdao Nuekjang; Warisara Seetaloed; Waruni Kanram; Sasipapron Janthawisut; Hattaya Bamrungsuk; Kuttika Kaewpin; Natthanicha Jaisaen; Pimpichaya Kokram; Ajcharaporn Kongyot; Chatchu-on Moksri; Wimonrat Thanapan	Đặng Thị Kim Thanh; Trần Thị Thanh Thúy; Bùi Thị Ánh Thảo; Lê Thanh Thúy; Nguyễn Thị Uyên; Lê Như Anh; Hoàng Thị Kiều Trinh; Nguyễn Khánh Đang; Võ Thị Kim Thoa; Vi Thị Như Quỳnh; Lưu Thị Huệ; Đoàn Thị Lâm Oanh; Lê Thị Yến; Trần Thị Bích Thủy	

== Preliminary round ==
- All times are Indochina Time (UTC+07:00).

=== Group A ===
Pos	Team	Pld	W	L	Pts	SW	SL	SR	SPW	SPL	SPR	Qualification
1	Thailand (H)	2	2	0	6	6	0	MAX	150	85	1.765	Semifinals
2	Philippines	2	1	1	3	3	3	1.000	119	114	1.044	Semifinals
3	Singapore	2	0	2	0	0	6	0.000	80	150	0.533	5th–7th semifinals

Source: SEA Games Thailand 2025
(H) Host

Date	Time		Score		Set 1	Set 2	Set 3	Set 4	Set 5	Total	Report
10 Dec	17:30	Singapore	0–3	Thailand	17–25	13–25	11–25			41–75	Report
11 Dec	17:30	Thailand	3–0	Philippines	25–11	25–17	25–16			75–44	Report
12 Dec	15:00	Philippines	3–0	Singapore	25–13	25–8	25–18			75–39	Report

=== Group B ===
Pos	Team	Pld	W	L	Pts	SW	SL	SR	SPW	SPL	SPR	Qualification
1	Vietnam	3	3	0	9	9	0	MAX	225	95	2.368	Semifinals
2	Indonesia	3	2	1	6	6	3	2.000	204	149	1.369	Semifinals
3	Malaysia	3	1	2	3	3	7	0.429	149	231	0.645	5th place match
4	Myanmar	3	0	3	0	1	9	0.111	140	243	0.576	5th–7th semifinals

Source: SEA Games Thailand 2025

Date	Time		Score		Set 1	Set 2	Set 3	Set 4	Set 5	Total	Report
10 Dec	12:30	Malaysia	0–3	Indonesia	12–25	12–25	16–25			40–75	Report
10 Dec	15:00	Vietnam	3–0	Myanmar	25–9	25–10	25–6			75–25	Report
11 Dec	12:30	Malaysia	0–3	Vietnam	8–25	5–25	3–25			16–75	Report
11 Dec	15:00	Indonesia	3–0	Myanmar	25–10	25–12	25–12			75–34	Report
12 Dec	12:30	Myanmar	1–3	Malaysia	25–18	17–25	16–25	23–25		81–93	Report
12 Dec	17:30	Vietnam	3–0	Indonesia	25–20	25–15	25–19			75–54	Report

== Final round ==
- All times are Indochina Time (UTC+07:00).

=== 5th–7th places ===
5th–7th semifinals
13 December
Singapore	3
Myanmar	0

5th place match
14 December
Malaysia	1
Singapore	3

==== 5th–7th semifinals ====
Date	Time		Score		Set 1	Set 2	Set 3	Set 4	Set 5	Total	Report
13 Dec	10:00	Singapore	3–0	Myanmar	25–20	25–22	25–18			75–60	Report

==== 5th place match ====
Date	Time		Score		Set 1	Set 2	Set 3	Set 4	Set 5	Total	Report
14 Dec	10:00	Malaysia	1–3	Singapore	16–25	21–25	28–26	20–25		85–101	Report

=== Final four ===
Semifinals
14 December
Thailand	3
Indonesia	0
14 December
Vietnam	3
Philippines	0

Gold medal match
15 December
Thailand	3
Vietnam	2
Bronze medal match
15 December
Indonesia	3
Philippines	1

==== Semifinals ====
Date	Time		Score		Set 1	Set 2	Set 3	Set 4	Set 5	Total	Report
14 Dec	12:30	Vietnam	3–0	Philippines	25–17	25–14	25–17			75–48	Report
14 Dec	15:00	Thailand	3–0	Indonesia	25–15	25–21	25–15			75–51	Report

==== Bronze medal match ====
Date	Time		Score		Set 1	Set 2	Set 3	Set 4	Set 5	Total	Report
15 Dec	15:00	Indonesia	3–1	Philippines	28–26	13–25	30–28	26–24		97–103	Report

==== Gold medal match ====
Date	Time		Score		Set 1	Set 2	Set 3	Set 4	Set 5	Total	Report
15 Dec	17:30	Thailand	3–2	Vietnam	19–25	25–13	25–18	23–25	25–23	117–104	Report

== Final standing ==
Rank	Team
1st place, gold medalist(s)	Thailand
2nd place, silver medalist(s)	Vietnam
3rd place, bronze medalist(s)	Indonesia
4	Philippines
5	Singapore
6	Malaysia
7	Myanmar

Qualified for the 2026 AVC Continental Championship

== See also ==
- Volleyball at the 2025 SEA Games – Men's tournament
