= 2025 SEA Women's V.League =

- Association: Southeast Asian Volleyball Association
- League: SEA V.League
- Sport: Volleyball
- Duration: 1–10 August
- Teams: 4

First Leg
- Season champions: Thailand
- Runners-up: Vietnam
- Season MVP: (Thailand) Pimpichaya Kokram

Second Leg
- Season champions: Vietnam
- Runners-up: Thailand
- Season MVP: (Vietnam) Nguyễn Thị Bích Tuyền

Seasons
- ← 2024 2026 →

The 2025 SEA Women's V.League was the fifth edition of the SEA V.League, contested by four women's national teams that are the members of the Southeast Asian Volleyball Association (SAVA), the sport's regional governing body affiliated to Asian Volleyball Confederation (AVC).

The first leg was held in Nakhon Ratchasima, Thailand from 1 to 3 August, while the second leg was held in Ninh Bình, Vietnam from 8 to 10 August.

Following the combined standings of the tournament, except Thailand which are part of the 2026 FIVB Women's Volleyball Nations League, Vietnam and the Philippines, the top two teams qualified for the 2026 AVC Women's Volleyball Cup. The Philippines was later chosen as hosts of the tournament on 6 September 2025, and their qualification spot was passed down to fourth-placed Indonesia.

== Teams ==
- Indonesia
- Philippines
- Thailand
- Vietnam

== Venues ==
First Leg	Second Leg
Nakhon Ratchasima, Thailand	Ninh Bình, Vietnam
Terminal 21 Korat	Ninh Bình Gymnasium
Capacity: 4,000	Capacity: 3,040

== Pool standing procedure ==
1. Total number of victories (matches won, matches lost)
2. In the event of a tie, the following first tiebreaker will apply: The teams will be ranked by the most point gained per match as follows:
  - Match won 3–0 or 3–1: 3 points for the winner, 0 points for the loser
  - Match won 3–2: 2 points for the winner, 1 point for the loser
  - Match forfeited: 3 points for the winner, 0 points (0–25, 0–25, 0–25) for the loser
3. If teams are still tied after examining the number of victories and points gained, then the SAVA will examine the results in order to break the tie in the following order:
  - Set quotient: if two or more teams are tied on the number of points gained, they will be ranked by the quotient resulting from the division of the number of all set won by the number of all sets lost.
  - Points quotient: if the tie persists based on the set quotient, the teams will be ranked by the quotient resulting from the division of all points scored by the total of points lost during all sets.
  - If the tie persists based on the point quotient, the tie will be broken based on the team that won the match of the Round Robin Phase between the tied teams. When the tie in point quotient is between three or more teams, these teams ranked taking into consideration only the matches involving the teams in question.

== First leg ==
=== Results ===
- All times are Indochina Time (UTC+07:00).

Pos	Team	Pld	W	L	Pts	SW	SL	SR	SPW	SPL	SPR
1	Thailand (H)	3	3	0	8	9	4	2.250	301	263	1.144
2	Vietnam	3	2	1	7	8	4	2.000	270	221	1.222
3	Philippines	3	1	2	3	5	7	0.714	248	269	0.922
4	Indonesia	3	0	3	0	2	9	0.222	199	265	0.751

Source: FIVB Live Center
(H) Host

Date	Time		Score		Set 1	Set 2	Set 3	Set 4	Set 5	Total	Report
1 Aug	13:30	Indonesia	0–3	Vietnam	11–25	11–25	22–25			44–75	Report
1 Aug	17:00	Philippines	1–3	Thailand	25–17	24–26	20–25	20–25		89–93	Report
2 Aug	13:30	Vietnam	3–1	Philippines	25–13	25–21	23–25	25–9		98–68	Report
2 Aug	17:00	Thailand	3–1	Indonesia	22–25	25–15	27–25	25–12		99–77	Report
3 Aug	13:30	Philippines	3–1	Indonesia	25–20	25–20	16–25	25–13		91–78	Report
3 Aug	17:00	Thailand	3–2	Vietnam	23–25	25–19	21–25	25–17	15–11	109–97	Report

=== Final standing ===
Rank	Team
1st place, gold medalist(s)	Thailand
2nd place, silver medalist(s)	Vietnam
3rd place, bronze medalist(s)	Philippines
4	Indonesia

2025 SEA V.League – First Leg champions

Thailand
8th title

14–woman roster
Kalyarat Khamwong, Piyanut Pannoy, Pornpun Guedpard, Donphon Sinpho, Thatdao Nuekjang, Warisara Seetaloed, Waruni Kanram, Sasipapron Janthawisut, Hattaya Bamrungsuk, Natthanicha Jaisaen, Pimpichaya Kokram, Ajcharaporn Kongyot (c), Thanacha Sooksod, Kanyarat Kunmuang
Head coach
Kiattipong Radchatagriengkai

=== Awards ===
- Most valuable player
  Pimpichaya Kokram (THA)
- Best setter
  Pornpun Guedpard (THA)
- Best outside spikers
  Angel Canino (PHI)
  Ajcharaporn Kongyot (THA)
- Best middle blockers
  Thatdao Nuekjang (THA)
  Trần Thị Bích Thủy (VIE)
- Best opposite spiker
  Nguyễn Thị Bích Tuyền (VIE)
- Best libero
  Nguyễn Khánh Đang (VIE)

== Second leg ==
=== Results ===
- All times are Indochina Time (UTC+07:00).

Pos	Team	Pld	W	L	Pts	SW	SL	SR	SPW	SPL	SPR
1	Vietnam (H)	3	3	0	8	9	2	4.500	262	227	1.154
2	Thailand	3	2	1	7	8	4	2.000	278	241	1.154
3	Philippines	3	1	2	3	4	6	0.667	223	239	0.933
4	Indonesia	3	0	3	0	0	9	0.000	172	228	0.754

Source: FIVB Live Center
(H) Host

Date	Time		Score		Set 1	Set 2	Set 3	Set 4	Set 5	Total	Report
8 Aug	16:00	Indonesia	0–3	Thailand	16–25	16–25	21–25			53–75	Report
8 Aug	19:00	Philippines	0–3	Vietnam	14–25	28–30	22–25			64–80	Report
9 Aug	16:00	Vietnam	3–0	Indonesia	25–20	25–19	25–20			75–59	Report
9 Aug	19:00	Thailand	3–1	Philippines	25–22	25–17	24–26	25–16		99–81	Report
10 Aug	16:00	Indonesia	0–3	Philippines	17–25	17–25	26–28			60–78	Report
10 Aug	19:00	Vietnam	3–2	Thailand	17–25	24–26	25–17	25–22	16–14	107–104	Report

=== Final standing ===
Rank	Team
1st place, gold medalist(s)	Vietnam
2nd place, silver medalist(s)	Thailand
3rd place, bronze medalist(s)	Philippines
4	Indonesia

2025 SEA V.League – Second Leg champions

Vietnam
1st title

14–woman roster
Trần Thị Thanh Thúy (c), Lưu Thị Ly Ly, Lê Thanh Thúy, Nguyễn Thị Bích Tuyền, Hoàng Thị Kiều Trinh, Nguyễn Khánh Đang, Võ Thị Kim Thoa, Nguyễn Thị Trinh, Vi Thị Như Quỳnh, Nguyễn Thị Phương, Phạm Thị Hiền, Đoàn Thị Lâm Oanh, Nguyễn Thị Uyên, Trần Thị Bích Thủy
Head coach
Nguyễn Tuấn Kiệt

=== Awards ===
- Most valuable player
  Nguyễn Thị Bích Tuyền (VIE)
- Best setter
  Pornpun Guedpard (THA)
- Best outside spikers
  Chatchu-on Moksri (THA)
  Vi Thị Như Quỳnh (VIE)
- Best middle blockers
  Trần Thị Bích Thủy (VIE)
  Wimonrat Thanapan (THA)
- Best opposite spiker
  Nguyễn Thị Bích Tuyền (VIE)
- Best libero
  Justine Jazareno (PHI)

== Results and combined standings ==
=== Combined standings ===
Pos	Team	Pld	W	L	Pts	SW	SL	SR	SPW	SPL	SPR	Qualification
1	Vietnam	6	5	1	15	17	6	2.833	532	448	1.188	2026 AVC Cup
2	Thailand	6	5	1	15	17	8	2.125	579	504	1.149	2026 FIVB Nations League
3	Philippines	6	2	4	6	9	13	0.692	471	508	0.927	2026 AVC Cup hosts
4	Indonesia	6	0	6	0	2	18	0.111	371	493	0.753	2026 AVC Cup

Source: FIVB Live Center

=== Summary ===
Leg	Date	Location	Champions	Runners-up	Third place	Purse ($)	Winner's share ($)
1	1–3 August 2026	(Thailand) Nakhon Ratchasima	Thailand (8)	Vietnam (6)	Philippines (5)	50,000	16,000
2	8–10 August 2025	(Vietnam) Ninh Bình	Vietnam (1)	Thailand (1)	Philippines (6)	50,000	16,000

== See also ==
- 2025 SEA Men's V.League
