= 2023 SEA Women's V.League – Second Leg =

Southeast Asian volleyball tournament

Tournament details
- Host country: Thailand
- City: Chiang Mai
- Dates: 11–13 August
- Teams: 4 (from 1 confederation)
- Venue: 1 (in 1 host city)

Final positions
- Champions: Thailand (5th title)
- Runners-up: Vietnam
- Third place: Indonesia
- Fourth place: Philippines

Tournament awards
- MVP: (Thailand) Chatchu-on Moksri
- Best Setter: (Indonesia) Arneta Putri Amelian
- Best OH: (Vietnam) Vi Thị Như Quỳnh; (Indonesia) Ratri Wulandari
- Best MB: (Thailand) Jarasporn Bundasak; (Vietnam) Đoàn Thị Xuân
- Best OPP: (Philippines) Alyssa Solomon
- Best Libero: (Thailand) Piyanut Pannoy

Tournament statistics
- Matches played: 6
- Attendance: 19,100 (3,183 per match)

The 2023 SEA Women's V.League – Second Leg was contested by four national teams that are the members of the Southeast Asian Volleyball Association (SEAVA), the sport's regional governing body affiliated to Asian Volleyball Confederation (AVC). Games were played at Chiang Mai, Thailand from 11 to 13 August 2023.

== Teams ==
- Indonesia
- Philippines
- Thailand
- Vietnam

== Venue ==
All matches
Chiang Mai, Thailand
700th Anniversary
Chiang Mai Sports Complex
Capacity: 3,000

== Pool standing procedure ==
1. Total number of victories (matches won, matches lost)
2. In the event of a tie, the following first tiebreaker was to apply: The teams was to be ranked by the most point gained per match as follows:
  - Match won 3–0 or 3–1: 3 points for the winner, 0 points for the loser
  - Match won 3–2: 2 points for the winner, 1 point for the loser
  - Match forfeited: 3 points for the winner, 0 points (0–25, 0–25, 0–25) for the loser

== League results ==
- All times are Indochina Time (UTC+07:00).

Pos	Team	Pld	W	L	Pts	SW	SL	SR	SPW	SPL	SPR
1	Thailand (H)	3	3	0	9	9	0	MAX	225	169	1.331
2	Vietnam	3	2	1	6	6	4	1.500	241	215	1.121
3	Indonesia	3	1	2	3	3	7	0.429	208	242	0.860
4	Philippines	3	0	3	0	2	9	0.222	231	279	0.828

Source: Daily Bulletin #4
(H) Host

Date	Time		Score		Set 1	Set 2	Set 3	Set 4	Set 5	Total	Report
11 Aug	15:00	Vietnam	3–0	Indonesia	25–19	25–22	25–10			75–51	Report
11 Aug	18:00	Philippines	0–3	Thailand	15–25	17–25	18–25			50–75	Report
12 Aug	12:00	Vietnam	3–1	Philippines	25–19	25–27	31–29	25–14		106–89	Report
12 Aug	15:00	Indonesia	0–3	Thailand	23–25	20–25	16–25			59–75	Report
13 Aug	15:00	Philippines	1–3	Indonesia	25–22	21–25	22–25	24–26		92–98	Report
13 Aug	18:00	Thailand	3–0	Vietnam	25–15	25–23	25–22			75–60	Report

== Final standing ==
Rank	Team
1st place, gold medalist(s)	Thailand
2nd place, silver medalist(s)	Vietnam
3rd place, bronze medalist(s)	Indonesia
4	Philippines

2023 SEA V.League – Second Leg champions

Thailand
5th title

Piyanut Pannoy, Pornpun Guedpard, Thatdao Nuekjang, Natthimar Kubkaew, Sutadta Chuewulim, Pimpichaya Kokram, Sasipapron Janthawisut, Ajcharaporn Kongyot, Chatchu-on Moksri, Tichakorn Boonlert, Donphon Sinpho, Wimonrat Thanapan, Jidapa Nahuanong, Jarasporn Bundasak
Head coach
Danai Sriwatcharamethakul

== Awards ==
- Most valuable player
  Chatchu-on Moksri (THA)
- Best setter
  Arneta Putri Amelian (INA)
- Best outside spikers
  Vi Thị Như Quỳnh (VIE)
  Ratri Wulandari (INA)
- Best middle blockers
  Jarasporn Bundasak (THA)
  Đoàn Thị Xuân (VIE)
- Best opposite spiker
  Alyssa Solomon (PHI)
- Best libero
  Piyanut Pannoy (THA)

== See also ==
- 2023 SEA Men's V.League – Second Leg
