= Nguyễn Khánh Đang =

Vietnamese volleyball player

Personal information
- Full name: Nguyễn Khánh Đang
- Nationality: Vietnam
- Born: October 3, 2000 (age 26) Long An, Vietnam
- Height: 1.58 m (5 ft 2 in)
- Weight: 56 kg (123 lb)
- Spike: 280 cm (9 ft 2 in)
- Block: 265 cm (8 ft 8 in)

Volleyball information
- Position: Libero
- Current club: (Vietnam) Hà Nội Tasco Auto
- Number: 12 (National team and club)

Career
- Years: Team
- 2015 – 2025: (Vietnam) VTV Bình Điền Long An
- 2023: (Vietnam) Sport Center 1 (selected team)
- 2026 – present: (Vietnam) Hà Nội Tasco Auto

National team
- Years: Team
- 2019, 2023 – present 2019 2017 – 2018: Vietnam; Vietnam U23; Vietnam U20
Honours
Women's volleyball
Representing Vietnam
Challenger Cup
Bronze medal – third place	2024 Manila	Team
AVC Cup
Gold medal – first place	2023 Gresik	Team
Gold medal – first place	2024 Manila	Team
Gold medal – first place	2025 Hanoi	Team
Bronze medal – third place	2026 Candon	Team
Southeast Asian Games
Silver medal – second place	2023 Phnom Penh	Team
Silver medal – second place	2025 Bangkok	Team
SEA V Cup
Gold medal – first place	2025 Ninh Bình	Team
Silver medal – second place	2023 Vĩnh Phúc	Team
Silver medal – second place	2024 Vĩnh Phúc / Nakhon Ratchasima	Team
Silver medal – second place	2025 Nakhon Ratchasima	Team
Silver medal – second place	2026 Hanoi	Team
Representing Vietnam U23
Asian Championship
Bronze medal – third place	2019 Hanoi	Team

Nguyễn Khánh Đang (born October 3, 2000) is a Vietnamese volleyball player. She is a member of Vietnam women's national volleyball team and Hà Nội Tasco Auto volleyball club.

== Clubs ==
- (Vietnam) VTV Bình Điền Long An (2015 – 2025)
- (Vietnam) Sport Center 1 (2023) (selected team)
- (Vietnam) Hà Nội Tasco Auto (2026 – )

== Career ==
=== National teams ===
==== Senior team ====
- 2023 SEA Games — Silver Medal
- 2023 Asian Challenge Cup — Champion
- 2023 FIVB Challenger Cup — 8th Place
- 2023 SEA V.League – First Leg — Runner-up
- 2023 Asian Championship — 4th Place
- 2022 Asian Games — 4th Place
- 2024 Asian Challenge Cup — Champion
- 2024 FIVB Challenger Cup — 3rd Place
- 2024 SEA V.League — Runner-up
- 2025 Asian Nations Cup — Champion
- 2025 SEA V.League – First Leg — Runner-up
- 2025 SEA V.League – Second Leg — Champion
- 2025 World Championship — 31st Place
- 2025 SEA Games — Silver Medal
- 2026 AVC Cup — 3rd Place
- 2026 SEA V Cup – First Leg — Runner-up
- 2026 SEA V Cup – Second Leg — 4th Place
- 2026 Asian Championship — 7th Place
- 2026 Asian Games — 7th Place

==== U23 team ====
- 2019 Asian Peace Cup — Champion
- 2019 Asian Championship — 3rd Place

==== U20 team ====
- 2018 Asian Championship — 6th Place

=== Clubs ===
- 2018 Vietnam League – Champion, with VTV Bình Điền Long An
- 2022 Vietnam League – 3rd Place, with VTV Bình Điền Long An
- 2023 Vietnam League – 3rd Place, with VTV Bình Điền Long An
- 2023 Asian Club Championship – Champion, with Sport Center 1
- 2024 Vietnam League – Champion, with VTV Bình Điền Long An
- 2025 AVC Champions League – Runner-up, with VTV Bình Điền Long An
- 2025 Vietnam League – Champion, with VTV Bình Điền Long An
- 2026 Vietnam League – Runner-up, with Hà Nội Tasco Auto

== Awards ==
- 2023 Asian Club Championship "Best libero"
- 2024 VTV9 - Binh Dien International Cup "Best libero"
- 2024 Asian Challenge Cup "Best libero"
- 2024 SEA V.League – Second Leg "Best libero"
- 2024 VTV Cup "Best libero"
- 2024 Vietnam League "Best digger"
- 2025 AVC Champions League "Best libero"
- 2025 Asian Nations Cup "Best libero"
- 2025 VTV Cup "Best libero"
- 2025 SEA V.League – First Leg "Best libero"
- 2025 Vietnam League "Best digger"
- 2026 VTV9 - Binh Dien International Cup "Best libero"
- 2026 SEA V Cup – First Leg "Best libero"
