= Volleyball at the 2021 SEA Games – Women's tournament =

Women's volleyball tournament at the 2021 SEA Games
- Venue: Đại Yên Arena, Quảng Ninh
- Dates: 13–22 May 2022
- Nations: 5

Medalists
gold medal	Thailand
silver medal	Vietnam
bronze medal	Indonesia

The women's volleyball tournament at the 2021 SEA Games was held at the Đại Yên Arena in Quảng Ninh from 13 May to 22 May 2022.

== Draw ==
No draw was made following the withdrawal of Singapore leaving the number of participating team to five.

== Venue ==
All matches
Quảng Ninh, Vietnam
Đại Yên Arena
Capacity: 5,000

== Participating nations ==
- Indonesia
- Malaysia
- Philippines
- Thailand
- Vietnam

=== Squads ===
Indonesia	Malaysia	Philippines	Thailand	Vietnam
(1) Nandita Ayu Salsabila OH; (2) Ratri Wulandari OH; (3) Megawati Hangestri Pertiwi OP; (6) Yolana Pangestika S; (7) Amalia Fajrina Nabila (c) OH; (8) Tisya Amallya Putri S; (9) Arsela Nuari Purnama OH; (11) Shintia Mauludina MB; (14) Dita Azizah L; (15) Yolla Yuliana OP; (17) Wilda Nurfadhilah MB; (20) Shella Onnan MB; Coach: (Indonesia) Risco Matulesy	(1) Chia Xin Ying OH; (2) Lee Wen Woey OH; (6) Wong Wee Yan OP; (7) Ally Clement Ong L; (8) Yong Xien Nie MB; (10) Low Mei Cing (c) OH; (11) Lim Wei Ni L; (12) Ngin Jia Ning MB; (13) Chew Jie In OH; (14) Yong Jia Tian OP; (16) Irene Siah Qi Min OH; (17) Tong Xuan Xuan MB; (18) Goh Chiao Huey S; (19) Kong Pei Jun S; Coach: (Malaysia) Liew Kok How	(1) Kyle Negrito S; (2) Aby Maraño (c) MB; (3) Jaja Santiago MB; (5) Dawn Macandili L; (6) Frances Molina OH; (7) Mylene Paat OP; (8) Kath Arado L; (10) Majoy Baron MB; (13) Dell Palomata MB; (15) Alyssa Valdez OH; (18) Ria Meneses MB; (20) Kat Tolentino OH/OP; (28) Jema Galanza OH; (32) Iris Tolenada S; Coach: (Brazil) Jorge Edson	(1) Wipawee Srithong OH; (2) Piyanut Pannoy L; (3) Pornpun Guedpard (c) S; (4) Thatdao Nuekjang MB; (6) Kannika Thipachot OH; (9) Jarasporn Bundasak MB; (12) Hattaya Bamrungsuk MB; (14) Sutadta Chuewulim OH; (16) Pimpichaya Kokram OP; (18) Ajcharaporn Kongyot OH; (19) Chatchu-on Moksri OH; (20) Supattra Pairoj L; (23) Sirima Manakij S; (24) Tichakorn Boonlert MB; Coach: (Thailand) Danai Sriwatcharamethakul	(1) Lê Thị Thanh Liên L; (3) Trần Thị Thanh Thúy (c) OH; (6) Nguyễn Thị Uyên OH; (7) Phạm Thị Nguyệt Anh OH; (8) Trần Việt Hương MB; (9) Trần Thị Bích Thủy MB; (10) Nguyễn Thị Bích Tuyền OP; (11) Hoàng Thị Kiều Trinh OP; (12) Nguyễn Thu Hoài S; (15) Nguyễn Thị Trinh MB; (16) Đinh Thị Thúy OH; (18) Lưu Thị Huệ MB; (19) Đoàn Thị Lâm Oanh S; (22) Nguyễn Thị Kim Liên L; Coach: (Vietnam) Thái Thanh Tùng

== Results ==
=== Preliminary round ===
- All times are Vietnam Standard Time (UTC+07:00)

Pos	Team	Pld	W	L	Pts	SW	SL	SR	SPW	SPL	SPR	Qualification
1	Thailand	4	4	0	12	12	1	12.000	314	166	1.892	Gold medal match
2	Vietnam	4	3	1	9	10	4	2.500	326	259	1.259	Gold medal match
3	Indonesia	4	2	2	6	7	7	1.000	287	279	1.029	Bronze medal match
4	Philippines	4	1	3	3	4	9	0.444	259	295	0.878	Bronze medal match
5	Malaysia	4	0	4	0	0	12	0.000	149	300	0.497	

Date	Time		Score		Set 1	Set 2	Set 3	Set 4	Set 5	Total	Report
13 May	11:00	Malaysia	0–3	Philippines	14–25	20–25	15–25			49–75	Report
13 May	17:00	Indonesia	1–3	Vietnam	17–25	18–25	25–18	20–25		80–93	Report
14 May	14:00	Thailand	3–0	Philippines	25–15	25–13	25–14			75–42	Report
15 May	11:00	Indonesia	3–0	Malaysia	25–10	25–13	25–5			75–28	Report
16 May	11:00	Thailand	3–0	Indonesia	25–15	25–12	25–14			75–41	Report
16 May	17:00	Vietnam	3–0	Malaysia	25–12	25–9	25–10			75–31	Report
17 May	11:00	Philippines	1–3	Indonesia	23–25	25–21	15–25	20–25		83–96	Report
17 May	17:00	Vietnam	1–3	Thailand	18–25	25–14	17–25	23–25		83–89	Report
18 May	14:00	Malaysia	0–3	Thailand	11–25	18–25	12–25			41–75	Report
19 May	17:00	Philippines	0–3	Vietnam	23–25	19–25	17–25			59–75	Report

=== Final round ===
- All times are Vietnam Standard Time (UTC+07:00)

==== Bronze medal match ====
Date	Time		Score		Set 1	Set 2	Set 3	Set 4	Set 5	Total	Report
21 May	17:00	Indonesia	3–1	Philippines	25–21	22–25	25–19	25–21		97–86	Report

==== Gold medal match ====
Date	Time		Score		Set 1	Set 2	Set 3	Set 4	Set 5	Total	Report
22 May	17:00	Thailand	3–0	Vietnam	25–20	25–14	25–14			75–48	Report

== Final standings ==
Rank	Team
1st place, gold medalist(s)	Thailand
2nd place, silver medalist(s)	Vietnam
3rd place, bronze medalist(s)	Indonesia
4	Philippines
5	Malaysia

== See also ==
- Men's tournament
