= 2023 Asian Women's Club Volleyball Championship =

International volleyball competition

- Official logo

Tournament details
- Host country: Vietnam
- City: Vĩnh Yên
- Dates: 25 April – 2 May
- Teams: 9 (from 1 confederation)
- Venue: 1 (in 1 host city)

Final positions
- Champions: (Vietnam) Sport Center 1 (1st title)
- Runners-up: (Thailand) Diamond Food–Fine Chef
- Third place: (China) Liaoning Donghua
- Fourth place: (Chinese Taipei) KingWhale Taipei

Tournament awards
- MVP: (Vietnam) Trần Thị Thanh Thúy
- Best Setter: (Thailand) Nootsara Tomkom
- Best OH: (Thailand) Sasipapron Janthawisut; (Vietnam) Trần Thị Thanh Thúy
- Best MB: (Thailand) Kaewkalaya Kamulthala; (China) Wang Lujia
- Best OPP: (Brazil) Beatriz Flávio
- Best Libero: (Vietnam) Nguyễn Khánh Đang

Tournament statistics
- Matches played: 26
- Attendance: 32,300 (1,242 per match)

The 2023 Asian Women's Club Volleyball Championship was the 23rd edition of the Asian Women's Club Volleyball Championship, an annual international women's volleyball club tournament organized by the Asian Volleyball Confederation (AVC) with Volleyball Federation of Vietnam (VFV).

The tournament was held in Vĩnh Yên, Vĩnh Phúc, Vietnam, from 25 April to 2 May 2023. The winner of the tournament qualified to 2023 FIVB Volleyball Women's Club World Championship.

Sport Center 1 won the tournament for the first time by beating Diamond Food–Fine Chef in a tie-break final. Trần Thị Thanh Thúy named as the MVP of the tournament. Liaoning Donghua secured the bronze against KingWhale Taipei in a hard-fought four sets.

== Qualification ==
Following the AVC regulations, the maximum of 16 teams in all AVC events will be selected by:

- 1 team for the host country
- 10 teams based on the final standing of the previous edition
- 5 teams from each of 5 zones (with a qualification tournament if needed)

=== Qualified associations ===
Event(s)		Dates	Location	Berths	Qualifier(s)
Host country		—N/a	—N/a	1	Vietnam
2022 Asian Championship		24–30 April 2022	(Kazakhstan) Semey	3	Kazakhstan; Thailand; Iran; ~~Uzbekistan~~; ~~Kyrgyzstan~~
Direct zonal wildcards	East Asia	15 January 2023	(Thailand) Bangkok	5	China; Chinese Taipei; Hong Kong; Japan; Mongolia (Note: It's the first time that Mongolia sent its team to participate in Asian Women's Club Volleyball Championship.)
Total				9	

Notes:

South Korea also planned to send a team but did not do so due to league scheduling conflict.

== Squads ==
=== Participating teams ===
The following teams were entered for the tournament.

Association	Team	Domestic league standing
Vietnam	Sport Center 1	N/A (National team)
Kazakhstan	Altay	2022–23 Kazakhstan Women's National League champions
Thailand	Diamond Food–Fine Chef	2021–22 Women's Volleyball Thailand League runners-up
Iran	Paykan Tehran	2022–23 Iranian Women's Volleyball Premier League champions
China	Liaoning Donghua	2021–22 Chinese Volleyball Super League 4th place
Chinese Taipei	KingWhale Taipei	2022–23 Enterprise Volleyball League champions
Hong Kong	Hip Hing	2022 VBAHK Cup champions
Japan	Hisamitsu Springs	2021–22 V.League Division 1 Women champions
Mongolia	Khuvsgul Erchim	2022–23 Mongolian Premier League champions

== Venues ==
The tournament was hosted in Vĩnh Phúc Gymnasium, located in Vĩnh Yên, Vĩnh Phúc, Vietnam.

Vĩnh Yên, Vietnam
Vĩnh Phúc Gymnasium
Capacity: 3,000

== Pool standing procedure ==
1. Total number of victories (matches won, matches lost)
2. In the event of a tie, the following first tiebreaker will apply: The teams will be ranked by the most point gained per match as follows:
  - Match won 3–0 or 3–1: 3 points for the winner, 0 points for the loser
  - Match won 3–2: 2 points for the winner, 1 point for the loser
  - Match forfeited: 3 points for the winner, 0 points (0–25, 0–25, 0–25) for the loser
3. If teams are still tied after examining the number of victories and points gained, then the AVC will examine the results in order to break the tie in the following order:
  - Set quotient: if two or more teams are tied on the number of points gained, they will be ranked by the quotient resulting from the division of the number of all set won by the number of all sets lost.
  - Points quotient: if the tie persists based on the set quotient, the teams will be ranked by the quotient resulting from the division of all points scored by the total of points lost during all sets.
  - If the tie persists based on the point quotient, the tie will be broken based on the team that won the match of the Round Robin Phase between the tied teams. When the tie in point quotient is between three or more teams, these teams ranked taking into consideration only the matches involving the teams in question.

== Preliminary round ==
- All times are Indochina Time (UTC+07:00).

=== Pool A ===
Pos	Team	Pld	W	L	Pts	SW	SL	SR	SPW	SPL	SPR	Qualification
1	(Vietnam) Sport Center 1	3	3	0	8	9	4	2.250	295	264	1.117	Semifinals
2	(Chinese Taipei) KingWhale Taipei	3	2	1	5	7	6	1.167	282	264	1.068	Semifinals
3	(Japan) Hisamitsu Springs	3	1	2	4	6	6	1.000	258	249	1.036	5th–9th places
4	(Iran) Paykan Tehran	3	0	3	1	3	9	0.333	219	277	0.791	5th–9th places

Date	Time		Score		Set 1	Set 2	Set 3	Set 4	Set 5	Total	Report
25 Apr	19:45	Paykan Tehran (Iran)	2–3	(Vietnam) Sport Center 1	22–25	25–21	18–25	25–22	10–15	100–108	Report
26 Apr	19:30	KingWhale Taipei (Chinese Taipei)	3–2	(Japan) Hisamitsu Springs	16–25	25–21	25–22	24–26	15–8	105–102	Report
27 Apr	19:30	Sport Center 1 (Vietnam)	3–1	(Japan) Hisamitsu Springs	25–20	17–25	25–21	25–15		92–81	Report
28 Apr	19:30	Paykan Tehran (Iran)	1–3	(Chinese Taipei) KingWhale Taipei	14–25	10–25	25–19	18–25		67–94	Report
29 Apr	16:30	Hisamitsu Springs (Japan)	3–0	(Iran) Paykan Tehran	25–20	25–15	25–17			75–52	Report
29 Apr	19:30	KingWhale Taipei (Chinese Taipei)	1–3	(Vietnam) Sport Center 1	12–25	23–25	25–20	23–25		83–95	Report

=== Pool B ===
Pos	Team	Pld	W	L	Pts	SW	SL	SR	SPW	SPL	SPR	Qualification
1	(Thailand) Diamond Food–Fine Chef	4	3	1	10	11	4	2.750	349	280	1.246	Semifinals
2	(China) Liaoning Donghua	4	3	1	9	10	3	3.333	316	243	1.300	Semifinals
3	(Kazakhstan) Altay	4	3	1	8	9	5	1.800	318	238	1.336	5th–9th places
4	(Mongolia) Khuvsgul Erchim	4	1	3	3	3	10	0.300	217	296	0.733	5th–9th places
5	(Hong Kong) Hip Hing	4	0	4	0	1	12	0.083	179	322	0.556	5th–9th places

Date	Time		Score		Set 1	Set 2	Set 3	Set 4	Set 5	Total	Report
25 Apr	13:00	Khuvsgul Erchim (Mongolia)	0–3	(China) Liaoning Donghua	15–25	13–25	9–25			37–75	Report
25 Apr	16:00	Altay (Kazakhstan)	3–2	(Thailand) Diamond Food–Fine Chef	22–25	19–25	25–22	25–14	15–11	106–97	Report
26 Apr	13:30	Hip Hing (Hong Kong)	0–3	(Thailand) Diamond Food–Fine Chef	8–25	12–25	12–25			32–75	Report
26 Apr	16:30	Khuvsgul Erchim (Mongolia)	0–3	(Kazakhstan) Altay	12–25	9–25	11–25			32–75	Report
27 Apr	13:30	Liaoning Donghua (China)	3–0	(Kazakhstan) Altay	25–19	25–22	25–21			75–62	Report
27 Apr	16:30	Hip Hing (Hong Kong)	1–3	(Mongolia) Khuvsgul Erchim	25–22	9–25	20–25	17–25		71–97	Report
28 Apr	13:30	Diamond Food–Fine Chef (Thailand)	3–0	(Mongolia) Khuvsgul Erchim	25–14	25–16	25–21			75–51	Report
28 Apr	16:30	Liaoning Donghua (China)	3–0	(Hong Kong) Hip Hing	25–20	25–8	25–14			75–42	Report
29 Apr	10:30	Altay (Kazakhstan)	3–0	(Hong Kong) Hip Hing	25–14	25–8	25–12			75–34	Report
29 Apr	13:30	Diamond Food–Fine Chef (Thailand)	3–1	(China) Liaoning Donghua	23–25	29–27	25–22	25–17		102–91	Report

== Final round ==
- All times are Indochina Time (UTC+07:00).
- The results and the points of the matches between the same teams that were already played during the preliminary round shall be taken into account for the classification round.

=== 5th–9th places ===
Pos	Team	Pld	W	L	Pts	SW	SL	SR	SPW	SPL	SPR
5	(Japan) Hisamitsu Springs	4	4	0	11	12	2	6.000	325	221	1.471
6	(Kazakhstan) Altay	4	3	1	10	11	3	3.667	331	219	1.511
7	(Iran) Paykan Tehran	4	2	2	6	6	6	1.000	255	262	0.973
8	(Mongolia) Khuvsgul Erchim	4	1	3	3	3	10	0.300	213	296	0.720
9	(Hong Kong) Hip Hing	4	0	4	0	1	12	0.083	196	322	0.609

Date	Time		Score		Set 1	Set 2	Set 3	Set 4	Set 5	Total	Report
30 Apr	16:30	Hisamitsu Springs (Japan)	3–0	(Hong Kong) Hip Hing	25–9	25–9	25–15			75–33	Report
30 Apr	19:30	Paykan Tehran (Iran)	3–0	(Mongolia) Khuvsgul Erchim	25–17	25–21	25–16			75–54	Report
1 May	10:30	Hisamitsu Springs (Japan)	3–0	(Mongolia) Khuvsgul Erchim	25–15	25–7	25–8			75–30	Report
1 May	13:30	Paykan Tehran (Iran)	0–3	(Kazakhstan) Altay	15–25	20–25	18–25			53–75	Report
2 May	10:30	Paykan Tehran (Iran)	3–0	(Hong Kong) Hip Hing	25–18	25–21	25–19			75–58	Report
2 May	13:30	Hisamitsu Springs (Japan)	3–2	(Kazakhstan) Altay	16–25	25–21	15–25	25–18	19–17	100–106	Report

=== Final four ===
Semifinals
1 May
(Vietnam) Sport Center 1	3
(China) Liaoning Donghua	1
1 May
(Thailand) Diamond Food–Fine Chef	3
(Chinese Taipei) KingWhale Taipei	0

Final
2 May
(Vietnam) Sport Center 1	3
(Thailand) Diamond Food–Fine Chef	2
3rd place match
2 May
(China) Liaoning Donghua	3
(Chinese Taipei) KingWhale Taipei	1

==== Semifinals ====
Date	Time		Score		Set 1	Set 2	Set 3	Set 4	Set 5	Total	Report
1 May	16:30	Diamond Food–Fine Chef (Thailand)	3–0	(Chinese Taipei) KingWhale Taipei	25–19	25–19	25–23			75–61	Report
1 May	19:30	Sport Center 1 (Vietnam)	3–1	(China) Liaoning Donghua	17–25	25–23	25–18	25–16		92–82	Report

==== 3rd place match ====
Date	Time		Score		Set 1	Set 2	Set 3	Set 4	Set 5	Total	Report
2 May	16:30	Liaoning Donghua (China)	3–1	(Chinese Taipei) KingWhale Taipei	26–24	25–20	22–25	25–21		98–90	Report

==== Final ====
Date	Time		Score		Set 1	Set 2	Set 3	Set 4	Set 5	Total	Report
2 May	19:30	Sport Center 1 (Vietnam)	3–2	(Thailand) Diamond Food–Fine Chef	21–25	17–25	25–20	25–22	15–10	103–102	Report

== Final standing ==
Rank	Team
1st place, gold medalist(s)	(Vietnam) Sport Center 1
2nd place, silver medalist(s)	(Thailand) Diamond Food–Fine Chef
3rd place, bronze medalist(s)	(China) Liaoning Donghua
4	(Chinese Taipei) KingWhale Taipei
5	(Japan) Hisamitsu Springs
6	(Kazakhstan) Altay
7	(Iran) Paykan Tehran
8	(Mongolia) Khuvsgul Erchim
9	(Hong Kong) Hip Hing

Qualified for the 2023 Club World Championship

2023 Asian Women's Club Champions
(Vietnam)
Sport Center 1
1st title

14–women roster
Lê Thị Thanh Liên, Trần Thị Thanh Thúy (c), Phạm Thị Nguyệt Anh, Trần Thị Bích Thủy, Hoàng Thị Kiều Trinh, Nguyễn Khánh Đang, Võ Thị Kim Thoa, Đoàn Thị Lâm Oanh, Nguyễn Thị Trinh, Vi Thị Như Quỳnh, Đinh Thị Trà Giang, Trần Tú Linh, Đoàn Thị Xuân, Lý Thị Luyến
Head coach
(Vietnam) Nguyễn Tuấn Kiệt

== Awards ==
- Most Valuable Player

Trần Thị Thanh Thúy (VIE) (Sport Center 1)

- Best Setter

Nootsara Tomkom (THA) (Diamond Food–Fine Chef)

- Best Outside Spikers

Sasipaporn Janthawisut (THA) (Diamond Food–Fine Chef)
Trần Thị Thanh Thúy (VIE) (Sport Center 1)

- Best Middle Blockers

Kaewkalaya Kamulthala (THA) (Diamond Food–Fine Chef)
Wang Lujia (CHN) (Liaoning Donghua)

- Best Opposite Spiker

Beatriz Flávio (BRA) (KingWhale Taipei)

- Best Libero

Nguyễn Khánh Đang (VIE) (Sport Center 1)

== See also ==
- 2023 Asian Men's Club Volleyball Championship
