= 2023 AVC Challenge Cup for Women =

Asian women's volleyball tournament

Piala Tantangan Bola Voli Putri Asia 2023
- Official logo

Tournament details
- Host country: Indonesia
- Cities: Gresik, East Java
- Dates: 18–25 June
- Teams: 11 (from 1 confederation)
- Venue: 1 (in 1 host city)

Final positions
- Champions: Vietnam (1st title)
- Runners-up: Indonesia
- Third place: Chinese Taipei
- Fourth place: India

Tournament awards
- MVP: (Vietnam) Trần Thị Thanh Thúy
- Best Setter: (Vietnam) Đoàn Thị Lâm Oanh
- Best OH: (Vietnam) Trần Thị Thanh Thúy; (Chinese Taipei) Wu Fang-yu
- Best MB: (Vietnam) Đinh Thị Trà Giang; (Indonesia) Wilda Nurfadhilah
- Best OPP: (Indonesia) Megawati Hangestri Pertiwi
- Best Libero: (Indonesia) Yulis Indahyani

Tournament statistics
- Matches played: 29
- Attendance: 22,500 (776 per match)

The 2023 AVC Challenge Cup for Women, was the fourth edition of the AVC Challenge Cup for Women, an annual international volleyball tournament organised by the Asian Volleyball Confederation (AVC) and in that year with the Indonesian Volleyball Federation (PBVSI). The tournament was held at Tridharma Sports Hall in Gresik, East Java, Indonesia, between 18 and 25 June 2023. The winner of the tournament, Vietnam, qualified for the 2023 FIVB Women's Volleyball Challenger Cup.

Vietnam won their first title by defeating host Indonesia in a tie-break final. Chinese Taipei took the bronze medal after defeating India in straight sets. Trần Thị Thanh Thúy named as the MVP of the tournament.

== Team ==
=== Qualification ===
Following the AVC regulations, the maximum of 16 teams in all AVC events was selected by:

- 1 team for the host country
- 10 teams based on the final standing of the previous edition
- 5 teams from each of 5 zones (with a qualification tournament if needed)

=== Qualified team ===
Country	Zone	Qualified as	Qualified on	Previous appearances			Previous best performance
Country	Zone	Qualified as	Qualified on	Total	First	Last	Previous best performance
Indonesia	SEAVA	Host country	20 December 2022	0	None		None
Australia	OZVA	1st OZVA team	2 February 2023	0	None		None
Chinese Taipei	EAZVA	1st EAZVA team	2 February 2023	0	None		None
Hong Kong	EAZVA	2nd EAZVA team	2 February 2023	1	2022		Champions (2022)
India	CAVA	1st CAVA team	2 February 2023	1	2022		Runners-up (2022)
Iran	CAVA	2nd CAVA team	2 February 2023	0	None		None
~~Kazakhstan~~	~~CAVA~~	~~3rd CAVA team~~	~~2 February 2023~~	~~0~~	~~None~~		~~None~~
Macau	EAZVA	3rd EAZVA team	2 February 2023	0	None		None
Mongolia	EAZVA	4th EAZVA team	2 February 2023	0	None		None
Philippines	SEAVA	1st SEAVA team	2 February 2023	0	None		None
Uzbekistan	CAVA	4th CAVA team	2 February 2023	1	2022		4th place (2022)
Vietnam	SEAVA	2nd SEAVA team	2 February 2023	0	None		None

== Pools composition ==
The overview of pools was released on 16 March 2023.

Pool A	Pool B	Pool C	Pool D
Indonesia (Hosts)	Hong Kong (1)	India (2)	Uzbekistan (4)
Macau (–)	Chinese Taipei (–)	Australia (–)	Mongolia (–)
Philippines (–)	Iran (–)	~~Kazakhstan (–)~~*	Vietnam (–)

* Kazakhstan withdrew from the tournament.

== Pool standing procedure ==
1. Total number of victories (matches won, matches lost)
2. In the event of a tie, the following first tiebreaker will apply: The teams will be ranked by the most point gained per match as follows:
  - Match won 3–0 or 3–1: 3 points for the winner, 0 points for the loser
  - Match won 3–2: 2 points for the winner, 1 point for the loser
  - Match forfeited: 3 points for the winner, 0 points (0–25, 0–25, 0–25) for the loser
3. If teams are still tied after examining the number of victories and points gained, then the AVC will examine the results in order to break the tie in the following order:
  - Set quotient: if two or more teams are tied on the number of points gained, they will be ranked by the quotient resulting from the division of the number of all set won by the number of all sets lost.
  - Points quotient: if the tie persists based on the set quotient, the teams will be ranked by the quotient resulting from the division of all points scored by the total of points lost during all sets.
  - If the tie persists based on the point quotient, the tie will be broken based on the team that won the match of the Round Robin Phase between the tied teams. When the tie in point quotient is between three or more teams, these teams ranked taking into consideration only the matches involving the teams in question.

== Squads ==
The full list of team squads were announced on the competition daily bulletin.

== Preliminary round ==
- All times are Western Indonesian Time (UTC+07:00)

=== Pool A ===
Pos	Team	Pld	W	L	Pts	SW	SL	SR	SPW	SPL	SPR	Qualification
1	Indonesia (H)	2	2	0	6	6	0	MAX	150	80	1.875	Pool E
2	Philippines	2	1	1	3	3	3	1.000	122	110	1.109	Pool E
3	Macau	2	0	2	0	0	6	0.000	68	150	0.453	9th–11th places

Source: Daily Bulletin 4 AVC Challenge Cup 2023
(H) Host

Date	Time		Score		Set 1	Set 2	Set 3	Set 4	Set 5	Total	Report
18 Jun	11:30	Macau	0–3	Indonesia	7–25	18–25	8–25			33–75	Report
19 Jun	14:00	Philippines	3–0	Macau	25–14	25–12	25–9			75–35	Report
20 Jun	19:00	Indonesia	3–0	Philippines	25–17	25–20	25–10			75–47	Report

=== Pool B ===
Pos	Team	Pld	W	L	Pts	SW	SL	SR	SPW	SPL	SPR	Qualification
1	Chinese Taipei	2	2	0	6	6	0	MAX	150	99	1.515	Pool F
2	Iran	2	1	1	2	3	5	0.600	153	170	0.900	Pool F
3	Hong Kong	2	0	2	1	2	6	0.333	147	181	0.812	9th–11th places

Source: Daily Bulletin 4 AVC Challenge Cup 2023

Date	Time		Score		Set 1	Set 2	Set 3	Set 4	Set 5	Total	Report
18 Jun	14:00	Hong Kong	0–3	Chinese Taipei	14–25	20–25	18–25			52–75	Report
19 Jun	16:30	Iran	3–2	Hong Kong	22–25	25–20	25–17	19–25	15–8	106–95	Report
20 Jun	14:00	Chinese Taipei	3–0	Iran	25–18	25–16	25–13			75–47	Report

=== Pool C ===
Pos	Team	Pld	W	L	Pts	SW	SL	SR	SPW	SPL	SPR	Qualification
1	India	1	1	0	3	3	1	3.000	88	77	1.143	Pool E
2	Australia	1	0	1	0	1	3	0.333	77	88	0.875	Pool E

Source: Daily Bulletin 4 AVC Challenge Cup 2023

Date	Time		Score		Set 1	Set 2	Set 3	Set 4	Set 5	Total	Report
18 Jun	16:30	Australia	1–3	India	25–13	16–25	22–25	14–25		77–88	Report

=== Pool D ===
Pos	Team	Pld	W	L	Pts	SW	SL	SR	SPW	SPL	SPR	Qualification
1	Vietnam	2	2	0	6	6	0	MAX	150	76	1.974	Pool F
2	Uzbekistan	2	1	1	2	3	5	0.600	129	171	0.754	Pool F
3	Mongolia	2	0	2	1	2	6	0.333	137	169	0.811	9th–11th places

Source: Daily Bulletin 4 AVC Challenge Cup 2023

Date	Time		Score		Set 1	Set 2	Set 3	Set 4	Set 5	Total	Report
18 Jun	19:00	Vietnam	3–0	Mongolia	25–12	25–17	25–12			75–41	Report
19 Jun	19:00	Uzbekistan	0–3	Vietnam	11–25	6–25	18–25			35–75	Report
20 Jun	16:30	Mongolia	2–3	Uzbekistan	20–25	25–14	25–15	16–25	10–15	96–94	Report

== Classification round ==
- All times are Western Indonesian Time (UTC+07:00).
- The results and the points of the matches between the same teams that were already played during the preliminary round shall be taken into account for the classification round.

=== Pool E ===
Pos	Team	Pld	W	L	Pts	SW	SL	SR	SPW	SPL	SPR	Qualification
1	Indonesia (H)	3	3	0	9	9	0	MAX	225	145	1.552	Semifinals
2	India	3	1	2	4	5	7	0.714	258	261	0.989	Semifinals
3	Australia	3	1	2	3	4	7	0.571	219	248	0.883	5th–8th semifinals
4	Philippines	3	1	2	2	4	8	0.500	241	289	0.834	5th–8th semifinals

Source: Daily Bulletin 6 AVC Challenge Cup 2023
(H) Host

Date	Time		Score		Set 1	Set 2	Set 3	Set 4	Set 5	Total	Report
21 Jun	16:30	Philippines	3–2	India	25–22	26–28	11–25	29–27	18–16	109–118	Report
21 Jun	19:00	Indonesia	3–0	Australia	25–13	25–17	25–16			75–46	Report
23 Jun	16:30	Philippines	1–3	Australia	18–25	22–25	25–21	20–25		85–96	Report
23 Jun	19:00	Indonesia	3–0	India	25–21	25–15	25–16			75–52	Report

=== Pool F ===
Pos	Team	Pld	W	L	Pts	SW	SL	SR	SPW	SPL	SPR	Qualification
1	Vietnam	3	3	0	9	9	0	MAX	225	128	1.758	Semifinals
2	Chinese Taipei	3	2	1	6	6	3	2.000	206	161	1.280	Semifinals
3	Iran	3	1	2	3	3	6	0.500	159	203	0.783	5th–8th semifinals
4	Uzbekistan	3	0	3	0	0	9	0.000	127	225	0.564	5th–8th semifinals

Source: Daily Bulletin 6 AVC Challenge Cup 2023

Date	Time		Score		Set 1	Set 2	Set 3	Set 4	Set 5	Total	Report
21 Jun	11:30	Iran	0–3	Vietnam	10–25	9–25	18–25			37–75	Report
21 Jun	14:00	Chinese Taipei	3–0	Uzbekistan	25–7	25–16	25–16			75–39	Report
23 Jun	08:30	Iran	3–0	Uzbekistan	25–18	25–17	25–18			75–53	Report
23 Jun	14:00	Chinese Taipei	0–3	Vietnam	20–25	17–25	19–25			56–75	Report

== Final round ==
- All times are Western Indonesian Time (UTC+07:00).

=== 9th–11th places ===
Pos	Team	Pld	W	L	Pts	SW	SL	SR	SPW	SPL	SPR
9	Hong Kong	2	2	0	5	6	2	3.000	184	135	1.363
10	Mongolia	2	1	1	4	5	3	1.667	172	143	1.203
11	Macau	2	0	2	0	0	6	0.000	72	150	0.480

Source: Daily Bulletin 8 AVC Challenge Cup 2023

Date	Time		Score		Set 1	Set 2	Set 3	Set 4	Set 5	Total	Report
21 Jun	09:00	Hong Kong	3–2	Mongolia	25–21	25–14	22–25	22–25	15–12	109–97	Report
24 Jun	09:00	Mongolia	3–0	Macau	25–9	25–11	25–14			75–34	Report
25 Jun	09:00	Macau	0–3	Hong Kong	12–25	12–25	14–25			38–75	Report

=== 5th–8th places ===
5th–8th semifinals
24 June
Australia	3
Uzbekistan	1
24 June
Philippines	0
Iran	3

5th place match
25 June
Australia	1
Iran	3
7th place match
25 June
Uzbekistan	1
Philippines	3

==== 5th–8th semifinals ====
Date	Time		Score		Set 1	Set 2	Set 3	Set 4	Set 5	Total	Report
24 Jun	11:30	Australia	3–1	Uzbekistan	25–21	17–25	28–26	25–19		95–91	Report
24 Jun	14:00	Philippines	0–3	Iran	20–25	13–25	16–25			49–75	Report

==== 7th place match ====
Date	Time		Score		Set 1	Set 2	Set 3	Set 4	Set 5	Total	Report
25 Jun	11:30	Uzbekistan	1–3	Philippines	14–25	25–13	18–25	18–25		75–88	Report

==== 5th place match ====
Date	Time		Score		Set 1	Set 2	Set 3	Set 4	Set 5	Total	Report
25 Jun	14:00	Australia	1–3	Iran	20–25	25–19	18–25	20–25		83–94	Report

=== Final four ===
Semifinals
24 June
Indonesia	3
Chinese Taipei	2
24 June
India	0
Vietnam	3

Final
25 June
Indonesia	2
Vietnam	3
3rd place match
25 June
Chinese Taipei	3
India	0

==== Semifinals ====
Date	Time		Score		Set 1	Set 2	Set 3	Set 4	Set 5	Total	Report
24 Jun	16:30	Indonesia	3–2	Chinese Taipei	22–25	26–24	22–25	25–20	15–12	110–106	Report
24 Jun	19:00	India	0–3	Vietnam	17–25	18–25	21–25			56–75	Report

==== 3rd place match ====
Date	Time		Score		Set 1	Set 2	Set 3	Set 4	Set 5	Total	Report
25 Jun	16:30	Chinese Taipei	3–0	India	25–13	25–15	25–18			75–46	Report

==== Final ====
Date	Time		Score		Set 1	Set 2	Set 3	Set 4	Set 5	Total	Report
25 Jun	19:00	Indonesia	2–3	Vietnam	18–25	27–25	25–21	20–25	13–15	103–111	Report

== Final standing ==
Rank	Team
1st place, gold medalist(s)	Vietnam
2nd place, silver medalist(s)	Indonesia
3rd place, bronze medalist(s)	Chinese Taipei
4	India
5	Iran
6	Australia
7	Philippines
8	Uzbekistan
9	Hong Kong
10	Mongolia
11	Macau

Qualified for the 2023 FIVB Challenger Cup

2023 AVC Challenge Cup champions

Vietnam
First title

14–woman roster
Trần Thị Thanh Thúy (c), Nguyễn Thị Kim Liên, Phạm Thị Nguyệt Anh, Trần Thị Bích Thủy, Hoàng Thị Kiều Trinh, Nguyễn Khánh Đang, Võ Thị Kim Thoa, Nguyễn Thị Trinh, Vi Thị Như Quỳnh, Đoàn Thị Xuân, Đoàn Thị Lâm Oanh, Trần Tú Linh, Lý Thị Luyến, Đinh Thị Trà Giang
Head coach
Nguyễn Tuấn Kiệt

== Awards ==
Trần Thị Thanh Thúy was the 2023 AVC Challenge Cup Most Valuable Player

- Most valuable player
  Trần Thị Thanh Thúy (VIE)
- Best setter
  Đoàn Thị Lâm Oanh (VIE)
- Best outside spikers
  Trần Thị Thanh Thúy (VIE)
  Wu Fang-yu (TPE)
- Best middle blockers
  Đinh Thị Trà Giang (VIE)
  Wilda Nurfadhilah (INA)
- Best opposite spiker
  Megawati Hangestri Pertiwi (INA)
- Best libero
  Yulis Indahyani (INA)

== See also ==
- 2023 FIVB Women's Volleyball Challenger Cup
