= Đinh Thị Trà Giang =

Vietnamese volleyball player (born 1992)

Personal information
- Full name: Đinh Thị Trà Giang
- Born: May 9, 1992 (age 34) Lạng Sơn, Việt Nam
- Height: 1.82 m (6 ft 0 in)
- Spike: 305 cm (10 ft 0 in)
- Block: 297 cm (9 ft 9 in)

Volleyball information
- Position: Middle Blocker
- Current club: Vietinbank VC
- Number: 23

National team
- Years: Team
- 2009 – 2024: Vietnam
Honours
Challenger Cup
Bronze medal – third place	2024 Manila	Team
Asian Challenge Cup
Gold medal – first place	2023 Gresik	Team
Gold medal – first place	2024 Manila	Team
Southeast Asian Games
Silver medal – second place	2009 Vientiane	Team
Silver medal – second place	2011 Palembang	Team
Silver medal – second place	2013 Naypyidaw	Team
Silver medal – second place	2015 Singapore	Team
Silver medal – second place	2023 Phnom Penh	Team
SEA V.League
Silver medal – second place	2023 Vĩnh Phúc	Team
Silver medal – second place	2024 Vĩnh Phúc / Nakhon Ratchasima	Team

Đinh Thị Trà Giang (born May 9, 1992) is a Vietnamese volleyball player who plays for the Vietnam women's national volleyball team and the former captain of Vietnam team.

== Clubs ==
- (Vietnam) Hà Nội VC (2005 – 2007)
- (Vietnam) Vietsov Petro (2007 – 2013)
- (Vietnam) Thanh Hóa VC (2014 – 2017, 2021)
- (Vietnam) Thông tin LienVietPostBank (2017) (loan)
- (Vietnam) VTV Bình Điền Long An (2018) (loan)
- (Vietnam) Kinh Bắc Bắc Ninh (2018 – 2019)
- (Vietnam) Than Quảng Ninh (2020)
- (Vietnam) Geleximco Thái Bình (2022)
- (Thailand) 3BB Nakornnont (2022 – 2023) (loan)
- (Vietnam) Vietinbank VC (2023 – )
- (Vietnam) Sport Center 1 (2023) (selected team)

== Career ==
=== National team ===
==== Senior team ====
- 2009 Asian Championship — 7th Place
- 2009 SEA Games — Silver Medal
- 2011 Asian Championship — 7th Place
- 2011 SEA Games — Silver Medal
- 2012 Asian Cup — 4th Place
- 2013 Asian Championship — 6th Place
- 2013 SEA Games — Silver Medal
- 2014 Asian Cup — 8th Place
- 2015 Asian Championship — 5th Place
- 2015 SEA Games — Silver Medal
- 2018 Asian Games — 6th Place
- 2018 Asian Cup — 5th Place
- 2023 SEA Games — Silver Medal
- 2023 Asian Challenge Cup — Champion
- 2023 FIVB Challenger Cup — 8th Place
- 2023 SEA V.League – First Leg — Runner-up
- 2024 Asian Challenge Cup — Champion
- 2024 FIVB Challenger Cup — 3rd Place
- 2024 SEA V.League — Runner-up

=== Clubs ===
- 2010 Vietnam League — Runner-Up, with Vietsov Petro
- 2013 Vietnam League — Bronze medal, with Vietsov Petro
- 2019 Vietnam League — Bronze medal, with Kinh Bắc Bắc Ninh
- 2022 Vietnam League — Champion, with Geleximco Thái Bình
- 2023 Asian Club Championship — Champion, with Sport Center 1

== Award ==
- 2023 Asian Challenge Cup "Best middle blocker"
- 2024 SEA V.League – First Leg "Best middle blocker"
