= SEA V Cup =

Southeast Asian national volleyball tournament

- Most recent season or competition: 2026 SEA Women's V Cup
- Former logo
- Formerly: ASEAN Grand Prix (2019–2022); SEA V.League (2023–2025)
- Sport: Volleyball
- Founded: 2017; 9 years ago
- First season: 2023 (men); 2019 (women)
- No. of teams: 6
- Region: Southeast Asia (SAVA)
- Most recent champions: M: Vietnam (1st title); W: Thailand (10th title)
- Most titles: M: Indonesia Thailand (3 titles each); W: Thailand (10 titles)

The SEA V Cup, formerly known as ASEAN Grand Prix and SEA V.League, is a series of international volleyball tournaments featuring teams from Southeast Asia.

== History ==
Plans of a regional women's volleyball league in Southeast Asia was first conceived in 2013 when AVC secretary-general Shanrit Wongprasert of Thailand met with officials of the Larong Volleyball sa Pilipinas, the national volleyball association of the Philippines. The league was proposed to adopt a home and away format as an effort to promote women's volleyball in the region.

SportsCore Event Management and Consultancy, Inc., the Philippine-based organizer of the Philippine Super Liga, along with club leagues from Indonesia, Thailand and Vietnam, was reportedly backing such plans. By July 2015, only "finishing touches" are yet to be made which includes the mechanics and official name of the tournament.

In December 2016, it was reported that the inaugural edition of the tournament was reportedly to be named as the "Southeast Asian SuperLiga" it was planned to be held from September 14 to 17, 2017. In January 2017, the tournament's name reportedly became the ASEAN Grand Prix.

The ASEAN Grand Prix was first held in 2019. Two separate tournaments was held in Thailand and the Philippines with Thailand winning the title for both competitions.

The series returned in 2022 as the ASEAN Grand Prix Women's Volleyball Invitation with a tournament scheduled in Thailand. A men's tournament was planned to be held in Indonesia and the Philippines as well, but the plan did not come to fruition. Thailand defended their AGP title after sweeping the three teams at the 2022 tournament.

From 2023, the tournament was renamed to Southeast Asian Volleyball League (SEA V.League). The inaugural men's tournament was also held in 2023.

In 2024, a new tournament named SEA V.League Challenge was created for the men's division, which includes some other national teams in Southeast Asia (Cambodia, Laos, Malaysia, and Singapore). The winner of SEA V.League Challenge will earn the right to participate in the next edition of SEA V.League, replacing the last placed team in the recent edition of SEA V.League.

The relegation system which was planned for 2025 eventually did not commence, as the tournament now bears FIVB World Ranking points. Hence, the 2025 edition saw five teams participating in the men’s tournament for the first time.

== Summary ==
=== Men's tournament ===
Year	Leg	Host					
Year	Leg	Host	Champions	Runners-up	3rd place	4th place	Teams
2023	First	(Indonesia); Bogor	Indonesia	Thailand	Vietnam	Philippines	4
2023	Second	(Philippines); Santa Rosa	Indonesia	Vietnam	Thailand	Philippines	4
2024	First	(Philippines); Manila	Thailand	Indonesia	Philippines	Vietnam	4
2024	Second	(Indonesia); Yogyakarta	Thailand	Indonesia	Philippines	Vietnam	4
2025	First	(Philippines); Candon	Thailand	Indonesia	Vietnam	Philippines	5
2025	Second	(Indonesia); Jakarta	Indonesia	Vietnam	Thailand	Philippines	5
2026	First	(Philippines); Candon	Cambodia	Indonesia	Thailand	Vietnam	6
2026	Second	(Indonesia); Jakarta	Vietnam	Thailand	Indonesia	Cambodia	6

=== Women's tournament ===
Year	Leg	Host					
Year	Leg	Host	Champions	Runners-up	3rd place	4th place	Teams
2019	First	(Thailand); Nakhon Ratchasima	Thailand	Indonesia	Philippines	Vietnam	4
2019	Second	(Philippines); Santa Rosa	Thailand	Indonesia	Philippines	Vietnam	4
2022	—N/a	(Thailand); Nakhon Ratchasima	Thailand	Vietnam	Indonesia	Philippines	4
2023	First	(Vietnam); Vĩnh Phúc	Thailand	Vietnam	Indonesia	Philippines	4
2023	Second	(Thailand); Chiang Mai	Thailand	Vietnam	Indonesia	Philippines	4
2024	First	(Vietnam); Vĩnh Phúc	Thailand	Vietnam	Philippines	Indonesia	4
2024	Second	(Thailand); Nakhon Ratchasima	Thailand	Vietnam	Philippines	Indonesia	4
2025	First	(Thailand); Nakhon Ratchasima	Thailand	Vietnam	Philippines	Indonesia	4
2025	Second	(Vietnam); Ninh Bình	Vietnam	Thailand	Philippines	Indonesia	4
2026	First	(Vietnam); Hanoi	Thailand	Vietnam	Indonesia	Philippines	4
2026	Second	(Thailand); Chiang Mai	Thailand	Philippines	Indonesia	Vietnam	4

== Participating nations ==
=== Men's tournament ===
Legend
1st	Champions
2nd	Runners-up
3rd	3rd place
4th	4th place
▲	Promoted to the next year's V.League
▼	Relegated to the next year's V.League Challenge

Team	2023		2024		2025		2026		Total
Team	(Indonesia); 1st	(Philippines); 2nd	(Philippines); 1st	(Indonesia); 2nd	(Philippines); 1st	(Indonesia); 2nd	(Philippines); 1st	(Indonesia); 2nd	Total
Cambodia	did not enter		SEA VLC ▲		5th	5th	1st	4th	4
Indonesia	1st	1st	2nd	2nd	2nd	1st	2nd	3rd	8
Myanmar	did not enter						6th	6th	2
Philippines	4th	4th	3rd	3rd	4th	4th	5th	5th	8
Thailand	2nd	3rd	1st	1st	1st	3rd	3rd	2nd	8
Vietnam	3rd	2nd	4th	4th	3rd	2nd	4th	1st	8

=== Women's tournament ===
Team	2019		2022 (Thailand)	2023		2024		2025		2026		Total
Team	(Thailand); 1st	(Philippines); 2nd	2022 (Thailand)	(Vietnam); 1st	(Thailand); 2nd	(Vietnam); 1st	(Thailand); 2nd	(Thailand); 1st	(Vietnam); 2nd	(Vietnam); 1st	(Thailand); 2nd	Total
Indonesia	2nd	2nd	3rd	3rd	3rd	4th	4th	4th	4th	3rd	3rd	11
Philippines	3rd	3rd	4th	4th	4th	3rd	3rd	3rd	3rd	4th	2nd	11
Thailand	1st	1st	1st	1st	1st	1st	1st	1st	2nd	1st	1st	11
Vietnam	4th	4th	2nd	2nd	2nd	2nd	2nd	2nd	1st	2nd	4th	11

== Debut of teams ==
=== Men's tournament ===
Years	Debutants	Total
2023	Indonesia	4
2023	Philippines	4
2023	Thailand	4
2023	Vietnam	4
2025	Cambodia	1
2026	Myanmar	1

=== Women's tournament ===
Year	Debutants	Total
2019	Indonesia	4
2019	Philippines	4
2019	Thailand	4
2019	Vietnam	4

== Awards ==
=== Men's tournament ===
Year	Leg	Most Valuable Player	Best Setter	Best Outside Spikers		Best Middle Blockers		Best Opposite Spiker	Best Libero
2023	(Indonesia) First	(Indonesia) Fahry Septian Putratama	(Vietnam) Đinh Văn Duy	(Thailand) Anurak Phanram	(Indonesia) Farhan Halim	(Indonesia) Hendra Kurniawan	(Thailand) Kissada Nilsawai	(Philippines) Steve Rotter	(Thailand) Tanapat Charoensuk
2023	(Philippines) Second	(Indonesia) Farhan Halim	(Vietnam) Đinh Văn Duy	(Thailand) Jakkrit Thanomnoi	(Indonesia) Boy Arnez Arabi	(Indonesia) Hendra Kurniawan	(Vietnam) Trương Thế Khải	(Philippines) Steve Rotter	(Indonesia) Prasojo
2024	(Philippines) First	(Thailand) Kissada Nilsawai	(Indonesia) Dio Zulfikri	(Thailand) Napadet Bhinijdee	(Philippines) Buds Buddin	(Philippines) Kim Malabunga	(Indonesia) Hendra Kurniawan	(Vietnam) Phạm Văn Hiệp	(Thailand) Tanapat Charoensuk
2024	(Indonesia) Second	(Thailand) Napadet Bhinijdee	(Indonesia) Dio Zulfikri	(Philippines) Buds Buddin	(Indonesia) Farhan Halim	(Thailand) Kissada Nilsawai	(Vietnam) Trần Duy Tuyến	(Thailand) Napadet Bhinijdee	(Thailand) Tanapat Charoensuk
2025	(Philippines) First	(Thailand) Amorntep Konhan	(Indonesia) Jasen Natanael Kilanta	(Vietnam) Nguyễn Ngọc Thuân	(Indonesia) Boy Arnez Arabi	(Thailand) Kissada Nilsawai	(Vietnam) Trần Duy Tuyến	(Philippines) Leo Ordiales	(Thailand) Tanapat Charoensuk
2025	(Indonesia) Second	(Indonesia) Boy Arnez Arabi	(Indonesia) Jasen Natanael Kilanta	(Vietnam) Nguyễn Ngọc Thuân	(Indonesia) Boy Arnez Arabi	(Thailand) Kissada Nilsawai	(Vietnam) Trần Duy Tuyến	(Indonesia) Rivan Nurmulki	(Philippines) Josh Ybañez
2026	(Philippines) First	(Cambodia) Voeurn Veasna	(Cambodia) Soun Channaro	(Indonesia) Farhan Halim	(Cambodia) Voeurn Veasna	(Vietnam) Trương Thế Khải	(Indonesia) Hendra Kurniawan	(Thailand) Napadet Bhinijdee	(Philippines) Josh Ybañez
2026	(Indonesia) Second	(Vietnam) Nguyễn Ngọc Thuân	(Thailand) Boonyarid Wongtorn	(Vietnam) Nguyễn Ngọc Thuân	(Cambodia) Voeurn Veasna	(Vietnam) Trần Duy Tuyến	(Indonesia) Hendra Kurniawan	(Thailand) Napadet Bhinijdee	(Thailand) Pakkapong Kwangnok

=== Women's tournament ===
Year	Leg	Most Valuable Player	Best Spiker	Best Server	Best Blocker	Best Setter	Best Libero
2019	(Thailand) First	(Thailand) Onuma Sittirak	(Thailand) Chatchu-on Moksri	(Indonesia) Megawati Hangestri Pertiwi	(Philippines) Majoy Baron	(Indonesia) Tri Retno Mutiara Lutfi	(Vietnam) Nguyễn Thị Kim Liên
2019	(Philippines) Second	(Thailand) Pleumjit Thinkaow	(Thailand) Pimpichaya Kokram	(Indonesia) Ratri Wulandari	(Philippines) Majoy Baron	(Indonesia) Tri Retno Mutiara Lutfi	(Philippines) Dawn Macandili-Catindig

Year	Leg	Most Valuable Player	Best Setter	Best Outside Spikers		Best Middle Blockers		Best Opposite Spiker	Best Libero
2022	(Thailand) N/A	(Thailand) Pimpichaya Kokram	(Thailand) Pornpun Guedpard	(Vietnam) Trần Thị Thanh Thúy	(Thailand) Ajcharaporn Kongyot	(Vietnam) Nguyễn Thị Trinh	(Thailand) Tichakorn Boonlert	(Indonesia) Megawati Hangestri Pertiwi	(Philippines) Kyla Atienza
2023	(Vietnam) First	(Thailand) Ajcharaporn Kongyot	(Vietnam) Đoàn Thị Lâm Oanh	(Vietnam) Trần Thị Thanh Thúy	(Thailand) Ajcharaporn Kongyot	(Indonesia) Wilda Nurfadhilah	(Thailand) Thatdao Nuekjang	(Vietnam) Hoàng Thị Kiều Trinh	(Thailand) Piyanut Pannoy
2023	(Thailand) Second	(Thailand) Chatchu-on Moksri	(Indonesia) Arneta Putri Amelian	(Vietnam) Vi Thị Như Quỳnh	(Indonesia) Ratri Wulandari	(Vietnam) Đoàn Thị Xuân	(Thailand) Jarasporn Bundasak	(Philippines) Alyssa Solomon	(Thailand) Piyanut Pannoy
2024	(Vietnam) First	(Thailand) Chatchu-on Moksri	(Philippines) Jia de Guzman	(Thailand) Chatchu-on Moksri	(Thailand) Ajcharaporn Kongyot	(Philippines) Thea Gagate	(Vietnam) Đinh Thị Trà Giang	(Vietnam) Nguyễn Thị Bích Tuyền	(Thailand) Piyanut Pannoy
2024	(Thailand) Second	(Thailand) Chatchu-on Moksri	(Thailand) Pornpun Guedpard	(Thailand) Chatchu-on Moksri	(Vietnam) Vi Thị Như Quỳnh	(Thailand) Thatdao Nuekjang	(Indonesia) Wilda Nurfadhilah	(Philippines) Alyssa Solomon	(Vietnam) Nguyễn Khánh Đang
2025	(Thailand) First	(Thailand) Pimpichaya Kokram	(Thailand) Pornpun Guedpard	(Philippines) Angel Canino	(Thailand) Ajcharaporn Kongyot	(Thailand) Thatdao Nuekjang	(Vietnam) Trần Thị Bích Thủy	(Vietnam) Nguyễn Thị Bích Tuyền	(Vietnam) Nguyễn Khánh Đang
2025	(Vietnam) Second	(Vietnam) Nguyễn Thị Bích Tuyền	(Thailand) Pornpun Guedpard	(Thailand) Chatchu-on Moksri	(Vietnam) Vi Thị Như Quỳnh	(Vietnam) Trần Thị Bích Thủy	(Thailand) Wimonrat Thanapan	(Vietnam) Nguyễn Thị Bích Tuyền	(Philippines) Justine Jazareno
2026	(Vietnam) First	(Thailand) Sasipaporn Janthawisut	(Thailand) Natthanicha Jaisaen	(Thailand) Sasipaporn Janthawisut	(Vietnam) Vi Thị Như Quỳnh	(Indonesia) Maradanti Namira Tegariani	(Thailand) Kaewkalaya Kamulthala	(Philippines) Alyssa Solomon	(Vietnam) Nguyễn Khánh Đang
2026	(Thailand) Second	(Thailand) Sasipaporn Janthawisut	(Thailand) Pornpun Guedpard	(Thailand) Sasipaporn Janthawisut	(Philippines) Eya Laure	(Thailand) Thatdao Nuekjang	(Vietnam) Trần Thị Bích Thủy	(Philippines) Alyssa Solomon	(Indonesia) Indah Guretno Dwi Margiani

== Medals summary ==
=== Men's tournament ===
Rank	Nation	Gold	Silver	Bronze	Total
1	Indonesia	3	4	1	8
2	Thailand	3	2	3	8
3	Vietnam	1	2	2	5
4	Cambodia	1	0	0	1
5	Philippines	0	0	2	2
Totals (5 entries)		8	8	8	24

=== Women's tournament ===
Rank	Nation	Gold	Silver	Bronze	Total
1	Thailand	10	1	0	11
2	Vietnam	1	7	0	8
3	Indonesia	0	2	5	7
4	Philippines	0	1	6	7
Totals (4 entries)		11	11	11	33

=== Combined medal summary ===
Rank	Nation	Gold	Silver	Bronze	Total
1	Thailand	13	3	3	19
2	Indonesia	3	6	6	15
3	Vietnam	2	9	2	13
4	Cambodia	1	0	0	1
5	Philippines	0	1	8	9
Totals (5 entries)		19	19	19	57

== SEA V.League qualifier ==
Men's tournament

Year	Remaining Teams				V.League Challenge Winner
2023	Indonesia	Philippines	Thailand	Vietnam	—N/a
2024	Indonesia	Philippines	Thailand	Vietnam	Cambodia ▲

== See also ==
- Southeast Asian Volleyball Association
- SEA V.League Challenge
