= Myanmar women's national volleyball team =

National sports team

Myanmar
- Association: Myanmar Volleyball Association
- Confederation: AVC
- FIVB ranking: NR (24 May 2026)

Uniforms
Home	Away

The Myanmar women's national volleyball team is the national women's volleyball team of Myanmar. It represents the country in international volleyball competitions and friendly matches.

== Results ==
=== Southeast Asian Games ===
- (Malaysia) 2017: 5th place
- (Cambodia) 2023: 7th place
- (Thailand) 2025: 7th place
