= Sasipaporn Janthawisut =

Thai volleyball player (born 1998)

Personal information
- Full name: Sasipaporn Janthawisut
- Nickname: Aom
- Nationality: Thai
- Born: June 10, 1997 (age 29); Phra Nakhon Si Ayutthaya, Thailand
- Height: 1.78 m (5 ft 10 in)
- Weight: 65 kg (143 lb)
- Spike: 291 cm (115 in)
- Block: 281 cm (111 in)

Volleyball information
- Position: Outside Hitter
- Current club: (United States) LOVB Salt Lake

National team
2022–	Thailand
Honours
Women's volleyball
Representing Thailand
Asian Games
Bronze medal – third place	2022 Hangzhou	Team
AVC Continental Championship
Gold medal – first place	2023 Nakhon Ratchasima	Team
Gold medal – first place	2026 Tianjin	Team
Southeast Asian Games
Gold medal – first place	2025 Thailand	Team
Gold medal – first place	2023 Phnom Penh	Team
SEA V Cup
Gold medal – first place	2026 Hanoi	Team
Gold medal – first place	2025 Nakhon Ratchasima	Team
Gold medal – first place	2024 Nakhon Ratchasima	Team
Gold medal – first place	2024 Vĩnh Phúc	Team
Gold medal – first place	2023 Chiang Mai	Team
Gold medal – first place	2023 Vĩnh Phúc	Team
Gold medal – first place	2022 Nakhon Ratchasima	Team
Silver medal – second place	2025 Ninh Binh	Team

Sasipaporn Janthawisut (Thai: ศศิภาพร จันทวิสูตร, born June 10, 1997, is a Thai indoor volleyball player. She is a current member of the Thailand women's national volleyball team.

== Clubs ==
- (Thailand) King-Bangkok (2013–2015)
- (Thailand) Nakornnont (2014–2016)
- (Thailand) Est Cola (2015–2016)
- (Thailand) Nakornnont (2017–2018)
- (Thailand) Diamond Food (2019–2023)
- (Vietnam) Geleximco Hưng Yên (2022–2023)
- (Thailand) Nakhon Ratchasima (2023–2024)
- (Vietnam) Hóa Chất Đức Giang (2023-2024)
- (Thailand) Diamond Food (2024–2025)
- (Thailand) PEA Sisaket (2025-2026)
- (Turkey) Sarıyer Belediyespor (2025–2026)
- (Thailand) Nakhon Ratchasima (2025–2026)
- (United States) LOVB Salt Lake (2026–2027)

== Awards ==
=== Individuals ===
==== Domestic ====
- 2020–21 Thailand League – "Best Outside Spiker"
- 2022–23 Thailand League – "Best Outside Spiker"
- 2022–23 Thailand League – "Best Scorer"
- 2022–23 Thailand League – "Best Server"
- 2023–24 Thailand League – "Best Scorer"
- 2023–24 Thailand League – "Best Server"
- 2024–25 Thailand League – "Best Outside Spiker"

==== International ====
- 2023 Asian Women's Club Volleyball Championship – "Best Outside Spiker"
- 2026 AVC Women's Volleyball Champions League – "Best Outside Spiker"
- 2026 SEA Women's V Cup Leg 1 – "Best Outside Spiker"
- 2026 SEA Women's V Cup Leg 1 – "Most Valuable Player"
- 2026 SEA Women's V Cup Leg 2 – "Best Outside Spiker"
- 2026 SEA Women's V Cup Leg 2 – "Most Valuable Player"
- 2026 AVC Continental Championship – "Best outside spikers"
