= 2019 ASEAN Grand Prix =

- Association: Southeast Asian Volleyball Association
- League: SEA V.League
- Sport: Volleyball
- Duration: 20 September – 6 October, 2019
- Matches: 12
- Teams: 4

First Leg
- Season champions: Thailand
- Runners-up: Indonesia
- Season MVP: (Thailand) Onuma Sittirak

Second Leg
- Season champions: Thailand
- Runners-up: Indonesia
- Season MVP: (Thailand) Pleumjit Thinkaow

Seasons
- 2022 →

The 2019 ASEAN Grand Prix is the inaugural edition of the ASEAN Grand Prix, a new annual international women's volleyball tournament which is contested by 4 national teams that are the members of the Southeast Asian Volleyball Association (SAVA), the sport's regional governing body affiliated to Asian Volleyball Confederation (AVC).

The first leg was held in Thailand at the Terminal 21 Korat, Nakhon Ratchasima, Thailand from 20 to 22 September 2019. The second leg was played at Santa Rosa, Laguna, Philippines from 4 to 6 October 2019.

== Teams ==
Four national teams featured in the 2019 ASEAN Grand Prix. Indonesia was decided not to participate in the second leg, and a selection team from the Philippine Super Liga planned to replace. However, Indonesia decided to participate in the second leg.

- Indonesia
- Philippines
- Thailand
- Vietnam

== Venues ==
The first leg was played at the Terminal 21 Korat, Nakhon Ratchasima, Thailand, and the second leg was played at the Santa Rosa Sports Complex, Santa Rosa, Laguna, Philippines.

== Pool standing procedure ==
1. Total number of victories (matches won, matches lost)
2. In the event of a tie, the following first tiebreaker was to apply: The teams was to be ranked by the most point gained per match as follows:
  - Match won 3–0 or 3–1: 3 points for the winner, 0 points for the loser
  - Match won 3–2: 2 points for the winner, 1 point for the loser
  - Match forfeited: 3 points for the winner, 0 points (0–25, 0–25, 0–25) for the loser

== First leg ==
- All times are Thailand Standard Time (UTC+07:00).

Pos	Team	Pld	W	L	Pts	SW	SL	SR	SPW	SPL	SPR
1	Thailand	3	3	0	9	9	2	4.500	275	215	1.279
2	Indonesia	3	2	1	5	7	5	1.400	260	258	1.008
3	Philippines	3	1	2	3	6	8	0.750	282	305	0.925
4	Vietnam	3	0	3	1	2	9	0.222	213	252	0.845

Date	Time		Score		Set 1	Set 2	Set 3	Set 4	Set 5	Total	Report
20 Sep	14:00	Indonesia	3–2	Philippines	25–21	26–28	12–25	25–18	15–9	103–101	
20 Sep	17:00	Thailand	3–0	Vietnam	25–18	25–14	25–22			75–54	
21 Sep	14:00	Thailand	3–1	Philippines	25–13	25–21	23–25	25–20		98–79	
21 Sep	17:00	Vietnam	0–3	Indonesia	19–25	21–25	15–25			55–75	
22 Sep	14:00	Vietnam	2–3	Philippines	21–25	25–22	21–25	25–15	12–15	104–102	
22 Sep	17:00	Thailand	3–1	Indonesia	25–17	27–29	25–20	25–16		102–82	

=== Final standing ===
Rank	Team
1st place, gold medalist(s)	Thailand
2nd place, silver medalist(s)	Indonesia
3rd place, bronze medalist(s)	Philippines
4	Vietnam

2019 AGP – First Leg champions

Thailand
1st title

14–woman roster
Piyanut Pannoy, Pornpun Guedpard, Thatdao Nuekjang, Pleumjit Thinkaow, Onuma Sittirak, Watchareeya Nuanjam, Wanitchaya Luangtonglang, Wilavan Apinyapong, Malika Kanthong, Pimpichaya Kokram, Chatchu-on Moksri, Kullapa Piampongsan, Tichakorn Boonlert, Tikamporn Changkeaw
Head coach
Danai Sriwatcharamethakul

=== Awards ===
- Most valuable player
  (Thailand) Onuma Sittirak
- Best spiker
  (Thailand) Chatchu-on Moksri
- Best server
  (Indonesia) Megawati Hangestri Pertiwi
- Best blocker
  (Philippines) Mary Joy Baron
- Best setter
  (Indonesia) Tri Retno Mutiara Lutfi
- Best libero
  (Vietnam) Nguyễn Thị Kim Liên

== Second leg ==
- All times are Philippine Standard Time (UTC+08:00).

Pos	Team	Pld	W	L	Pts	SW	SL	SR	SPW	SPL	SPR
1	Thailand	3	3	0	9	9	0	MAX	225	136	1.654
2	Indonesia	3	2	1	6	6	5	1.200	253	248	1.020
3	Philippines	3	1	2	3	4	6	0.667	197	237	0.831
4	Vietnam	3	0	3	0	1	9	0.111	198	252	0.786

Date	Time		Score		Set 1	Set 2	Set 3	Set 4	Set 5	Total	Report
4 Oct	16:00	Philippines	3–0	Vietnam	25–21	25–23	25–21			75–65	
4 Oct	18:30	Indonesia	0–3	Thailand	16–25	17–25	21–25			54–75	
5 Oct	16:00	Indonesia	3–1	Vietnam	29–27	25–20	23–25	25–17		102–89	
5 Oct	18:30	Philippines	0–3	Thailand	12–25	16–25	10–25			38–75	
6 Oct	16:00	Thailand	3–0	Vietnam	25–21	25–12	25–11			75–44	
6 Oct	18:30	Philippines	1–3	Indonesia	21–25	17–25	25–22	21–25		84–97	

=== Final standing ===
Rank	Team
1st place, gold medalist(s)	Thailand
2nd place, silver medalist(s)	Indonesia
3rd place, bronze medalist(s)	Philippines
4	Vietnam

2019 AGP – Second Leg champions

Thailand
2nd title

14–woman roster
Piyanut Pannoy, Pornpun Guedpard, Thatdao Nuekjang, Pleumjit Thinkaow, Onuma Sittirak, Watchareeya Nuanjam, Wanitchaya Luangtonglang, Wilavan Apinyapong, Malika Kanthong, Pimpichaya Kokram, Chatchu-on Moksri, Kullapa Piampongsan, Tichakorn Boonlert, Tikamporn Changkeaw
Head coach
Danai Sriwatcharamethakul

=== Awards ===
- Most valuable player
  (Thailand) Pleumjit Thinkaow
- Best spiker
  (Thailand) Pimpichaya Kokram
- Best server
  (Indonesia) Wulandri Ratri
- Best blocker
  (Philippines) Mary Joy Baron
- Best setter
  (Indonesia) Mutiara Lutfi Tri Retno
- Best libero
  (Philippines) Dawn Macandili

== Results and standings ==
Leg	Date	Grand Prix	Location	Winner	Runner-up	Third place	Purse ($)	Winner's share ($)
1	Sep 20–22	SAT Thailand Volleyball Invitation	(Thailand) Nakhon Ratchasima	Thailand (1)	Indonesia (1)	Philippines (1)	90,000	30,000
2	Oct 4–6	PHISGOC Volleyball Test Event	(Philippines) Santa Rosa	Thailand (2)	Indonesia (2)	Philippines (2)	n/a	n/a
