= Thanacha Sooksod =

Thai volleyball player (born 2000)

Personal information
- Full name: Thanacha Sooksod
- Nickname: Momay
- Nationality: Thai
- Born: May 26, 2000 (age 26); Suphan Buri, Thailand
- Height: 1.81 m (5 ft 11 in)
- Weight: 65 kg (143 lb)
- Spike: 288 cm (113 in)
- Block: 275 cm (108 in)

Volleyball information
- Position: Opposite spiker
- Current club: (South Korea) Korea Expressway Corporation Hi-Pass
- Number: 21 (National team), 19 (Club)

National team
2018–2025	Thailand
Honours
Women's volleyball
Representing Thailand
Asian Games
Bronze medal – third place	2022 Hangzhou	Team
Asian Championship
Gold medal – first place	2023 Nakhon Ratchasima
Asian Cup
Bronze medal – third place	2018 Nakhon Ratchasima	Team
Bronze medal – third place	2022 Pasig	Team
SEA Games
Gold medal – first place	2023 Cambodia	Team

Thanacha Sooksod (Thai: ธนัชชา สุขสด, RTGS: Thanatcha Suksot, born 26 May 2000 in Suphan Buri) is a Thai indoor volleyball player. She is a member of the Thailand women's national volleyball team.

== Career ==
In 2018 she joined senior national volleyball team.

== Clubs ==
- (Thailand) Supreme Chonburi (2018–2019)
- (Japan) PFU BlueCats (2019–2020)
- (Thailand) Supreme Chonburi (2020)
- (Thailand) Diamond Food (2020–2022)
- (Japan) Okayama Seagulls (2021–2022)
- (South Korea) Korea Expressway Corporation Hi-Pass (2023–2024)
- (Romania) CS Rapid Bucuresti (2024)
- (South Korea) Korea Expressway Corporation Hi-Pass (2024–)

== Awards ==
=== Individuals ===
- 2018 U19 Asian Championship – "Best outside spiker"
- 2019 VTV Binh Dien Cup – "Best opposite spiker"

=== Club ===
- 2018–19 Thailand League – Runner-up, with Supreme Chonburi
- 2019 Thai–Denmark Super League – Champion, with Supreme Chonburi
- 2019 Asian Club Championship – Runner-up, with Supreme Chonburi
