= 2022 ASEAN Grand Prix =

International sporting competition

- Association: Southeast Asian Volleyball Association
- League: SEA V.League
- Sport: Volleyball
- Duration: 9–11 September, 2022
- Matches: 6
- Teams: 4
- Total attendance: 22,400
- Average attendance: 3,733

2nd ASEAN Grand Prix
- Season champions: Thailand
- Runners-up: Vietnam
- Season MVP: (Thailand) Pimpichaya Kokram

Seasons
- ← 2019 2023 →

The 2nd ASEAN Grand Prix Women's Volleyball Invitation was the second edition of the ASEAN Grand Prix. It is an international women's volleyball tournament contested by 4 national teams that are the members of the Southeast Asian Volleyball Association (SAVA), the sport's regional governing body affiliated to Asian Volleyball Confederation (AVC). Games were played at Nakhon Ratchasima, Thailand from 9 to 11 September 2022.

== Teams ==
- Indonesia
- Philippines
- Thailand
- Vietnam

== Venue ==
The list of the host city and venue are the following:

Nakhon Ratchasima, Thailand
Korat Chatchai Hall
Capacity: 5,000
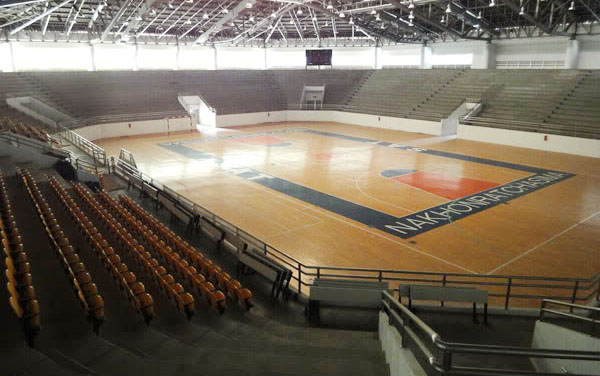

== Pool standing procedure ==
1. Total number of victories (matches won, matches lost)
2. In the event of a tie, the following first tiebreaker was to apply: The teams was to be ranked by the most point gained per match as follows:
  - Match won 3–0 or 3–1: 3 points for the winner, 0 points for the loser
  - Match won 3–2: 2 points for the winner, 1 point for the loser
  - Match forfeited: 3 points for the winner, 0 points (0–25, 0–25, 0–25) for the loser

== League results ==
- All times are Indochina Time (UTC+07:00).

Pos	Team	Pld	W	L	Pts	SW	SL	SR	SPW	SPL	SPR
1	Thailand	3	3	0	9	9	0	MAX	226	164	1.378
2	Vietnam	3	2	1	6	6	3	2.000	210	171	1.228
3	Indonesia	3	1	2	3	3	6	0.500	180	219	0.822
4	Philippines	3	0	3	0	0	9	0.000	164	226	0.726

Date	Time		Score		Set 1	Set 2	Set 3	Set 4	Set 5	Total	Report
9 Sep	15:00	Indonesia	0–3	Vietnam	23–25	19–25	9–25			51–75	Report
9 Sep	18:00	Thailand	3–0	Philippines	25–17	25–22	25–12			75–51	Report
10 Sep	15:00	Vietnam	3–0	Philippines	25–12	25–16	25–16			75–44	Report
10 Sep	18:00	Indonesia	0–3	Thailand	22–25	18–25	13–25			53–75	Report
11 Sep	15:00	Philippines	0–3	Indonesia	24–26	22–25	23–25			69–76	Report
11 Sep	18:00	Thailand	3–0	Vietnam	25–19	25–17	26–24			76–60	Report

== Final standing ==
Rank	Team
1st place, gold medalist(s)	Thailand
2nd place, silver medalist(s)	Vietnam
3rd place, bronze medalist(s)	Indonesia
4	Philippines

2022 AGP champions

Thailand
3rd title

14–woman roster
Wipawee Srithong, Piyanut Pannoy, Pornpun Guedpard (c), Kannika Thipachot, Sasipapron Janthawisut, Watchareeya Nuanjam, Hattaya Bamrungsuk, Natthanicha Jaisaen, Kaewkalaya Kamulthala, Pimpichaya Kokram, Ajcharaporn Kongyot, Thanacha Sooksod, Nattaporn Sanitklang, Tichakorn Boonlert
Head coach
Danai Sriwatcharamethakul

== Awards ==
- Most valuable player
  Pimpichaya Kokram (THA)
- Best setter
  Pornpun Guedpard (THA)
- Best outside spikers
  Trần Thị Thanh Thúy (VIE)
  Ajcharaporn Kongyot (THA)
- Best middle blockers
  Nguyễn Thị Trinh (VIE)
  Tichakorn Boonlert (THA)
- Best opposite spiker
  Megawati Hangestri Pertiwi (INA)
- Best libero
  Kyla Atienza (PHI)

== Prize money ==
The winners will receive US$25,000, while second placed team will receive US$20,000. Third place holder will be rewarded with US$15,000, fourth placed one is US$10,000.
