= 2023 SEA Women's V.League =

Southeast Asian volleyball tournament

- Association: Southeast Asian Volleyball Association
- League: SEA V.League
- Sport: Volleyball
- Duration: 4–13 August 2023
- Matches: 12
- Teams: 4
- Total attendance: 34,700
- Average attendance: 2,892

First Leg
- Season champions: Thailand
- Runners-up: Vietnam
- Season MVP: (Thailand) Ajcharaporn Kongyot

Second Leg
- Season champions: Thailand
- Runners-up: Vietnam
- Season MVP: (Thailand) Chatchu-on Moksri

Seasons
- ← 2022 2024 →

The 2023 SEA Women's V.League was the third edition of the SEA V.League, contested by four women's national teams that are the members of the Southeast Asian Volleyball Association (SAVA), the sport's regional governing body affiliated to Asian Volleyball Confederation (AVC).

The first leg was held in Vĩnh Phúc, Vietnam from 4 to 6 August while the second leg was held in Chiang Mai, Thailand from 11 to 13 August.

== Teams ==
- Indonesia
- Philippines
- Thailand
- Vietnam

== Venues ==
First Leg	Second Leg
Vĩnh Phúc, Vietnam	Chiang Mai, Thailand
Vĩnh Phúc Gymnasium	700th Anniversary; Chiang Mai Sports Complex
Capacity: 3,000	Capacity: 3,000

== Results and standings ==
Leg	Date	Location	Champions	Runners-up	Third place	Purse ($)	Winner's share ($)
1	4–6 August 2023	(Vietnam) Vĩnh Phúc	Thailand (4)	Vietnam (2)	Indonesia (2)	50,000	17,000
2	11–13 August 2023	(Thailand) Chiang Mai	Thailand (5)	Vietnam (3)	Indonesia (3)	50,000	17,000
