= Thatdao Nuekjang =

Thai volleyball player (born 1994)

Personal information
- Nickname: Nan
- Born: Khanittha Nuekjang; 3 February 1994 (age 32) Roi Et, Thailand
- Height: 185 cm (6 ft 1 in)
- Weight: 72 kg (159 lb)
- Spike: 308 cm (121 in)
- Block: 296 cm (117 in)

Volleyball information
- Position: Middle Blocker
- Current club: (Japan) PFU BlueCats
- Number: 5 (National team), 15 (Club)

National team
- Years: Team
- 2013–: Thailand
Honours
Women's volleyball
Representing Thailand
Montreux Volley Masters
Silver medal – second place	2016 Switzerland	Team
Asian Games
Silver medal – second place	2018 Jakarta/Palembang	Team
Bronze medal – third place	2014 Incheon	Team
Bronze medal – third place	2022 Hangzhou	Team
Bronze medal – third place	2026 Aichi/Nagoya	Team
Asian Championship
Gold medal – first place	2013 Nakhon Ratchasima
Gold medal – first place	2023 Nakhon Ratchasima
Gold medal – first place	2026 Tianjin	Team
Silver medal – second place	2019 Seoul
Asian Cup
Bronze medal – third place	2016 Vĩnh Phúc	Team
Bronze medal – third place	2018 Nakhon Ratchasima	Team
Summer Universiade
Bronze medal – third place	2013 Kazan	Team
ASEAN Grand Prix
Gold medal – first place	2019 Nakhon Ratchasima	Team
Southeast Asian Games
Gold medal – first place	2013 Naypyidaw	Team
Gold medal – first place	2019 Philippines	Team

Thatdao Nuekjang (Thai: ทัดดาว นึกแจ้ง; RTGS: Thatdao Nuekchaeng; born 3 February 1994) is a Thai volleyball player. She is a current member of the Thailand women's national volleyball team.

== Career ==
She is on the list 2019 Korea-Thailand all star super match competition. In 2024, she will be the new captain of Thailand women's national volleyball team to play in 2024 Tournament.

== Clubs ==
- (Thailand) Idea Khonkaen (2012–2020)
- (Japan) JT Marvelous (2020–2023)
- (Japan) Hitachi Rivale (2023–2024)
- (Japan) PFU BlueCats (2024–)

== Awards ==
=== Individuals ===
- 2015 VTV Cup Championship – "Best Middle Blocker"
- 2016–17 Thailand League – "Best Middle Blocker"
- 2020 Thailand League – "Best Middle Blocker"
- 2023 Asian Championship – "Best Middle Blocker"
- 2025 SEA V.League - "Best Middle Blocker"
- 2026 AVC Continental Championship – "Best Middle Blocker"

=== Clubs ===
- 2012–13 Thailand League – Champion, with Idea Khonkaen
- 2013 Thai–Denmark Super League – Champion, with Idea Khonkaen
- 2019 Thai-Denmark Super League – Bronze medal, with Thai-Denmark Khonkaen Star
- 2020 Thailand League – Runner-up, with Khonkaen Star
- 2020 Empress's Cup All Japan Championship – Champion, with JT Marvelous
- 2020–21 Japan V.League Division 1 – Champion, with JT Marvelous

== Royal decoration ==
- 2013 – Commander (Third Class) of The Most Exalted Order of the White Elephant
- 2023 – Commander (Third Class) of The Most Admirable Order of the Direkgunabhorn
