= 2024 SEA Women's V.League =

- Association: Southeast Asian Volleyball Association
- League: SEA V.League
- Sport: Volleyball
- Duration: 2–11 August, 2024
- Matches: 12
- Teams: 4

First Leg
- Season champions: Thailand
- Runners-up: Vietnam
- Season MVP: (Thailand) Chatchu-on Moksri

Second Leg
- Season champions: Thailand
- Runners-up: Vietnam
- Season MVP: (Thailand) Chatchu-on Moksri

Seasons
- ← 2023 2025 →

The 2024 SEA Women's V.League was the fourth edition of the SEA V.League, contested by four women's national teams that are the members of the Southeast Asian Volleyball Association (SAVA), the sport's regional governing body affiliated to Asian Volleyball Confederation (AVC).

The first leg was held in Vĩnh Phúc, Vietnam on 2–4 August while the second leg was held in Nakhon Ratchasima, Thailand on 9–11 August.

== Teams ==
- Indonesia
- Philippines
- Thailand
- Vietnam

== Venues ==
First Leg	Second Leg
Vĩnh Phúc, Vietnam	Nakhon Ratchasima, Thailand
Vĩnh Phúc Gymnasium	Korat Chatchai Hall
Capacity: 3,000	Capacity: 5,000

== Results and standings ==
Leg	Date	Location	Champions	Runners-up	Third place	Purse ($)	Winner's share ($)
1	2–4 August 2024	(Vietnam) Vĩnh Phúc	Thailand (6)	Vietnam (4)	Philippines (3)	50,000	16,000
2	9–11 August 2024	(Thailand) Nakhon Ratchasima	Thailand (7)	Vietnam (5)	Philippines (4)	50,000	16,000
