= Philippines women's national volleyball team results and fixtures =

The following is a list of fixtures and results of the Philippines women's national volleyball team against other national teams as well as foreign club sides.

== 1960s to 1990s ==
=== 1962 ===
Opponent	Date	Result	Set						Event	Location
Opponent	Date	Result	1	2	3	4	5	Total	Event	Location
South Korea	August 25, 1962	2–3	15–10	16–14	6–15	2–15	11–15	50–69	1962 Asian Games	Jakarta, Indonesia
Indonesia	August 26, 1962	0–3	11–15	8–15	8–15			27–45	1962 Asian Games	Jakarta, Indonesia
Japan	August 27, 1962	0–3	4–15	0–15	3–15			7–45	1962 Asian Games	Jakarta, Indonesia
South Korea	August 29, 1962	0–3	19–21	20–22	12–21			51–64	1962 Asian Games – Nine-a-side^{[1]}	Jakarta, Indonesia
Indonesia	August 30, 1962	2–3	17–21	14–21	21–19	21–16	17–21	90–98	1962 Asian Games – Nine-a-side^{[1]}	Jakarta, Indonesia
Japan	August 31, 1962	0–3	15–21	17–21	6–21			38–63	1962 Asian Games – Nine-a-side^{[1]}	Jakarta, Indonesia

=== 1974 ===
Opponent	Date	Result	Set						Event	Location
Opponent	Date	Result	1	2	3	4	5	Total	Event	Location
Hungary	September 13, 1974	0–3	4–15	2–15	2–15			8–45	1974 FIVB Women's Volleyball World Championship	Mexico City, Mexico
Romania	September 14, 1974	0–3	3–15	6–15	5–15			14–45	1974 FIVB Women's Volleyball World Championship	Mexico City, Mexico
Brazil	September 15, 1974	0–3	5–15	2–15	10–15			14–45	1974 FIVB Women's Volleyball World Championship	Mexico City, Mexico
Puerto Rico	September 18, 1974	3–0	15–10	15–5	15–2			45–17	1974 FIVB Women's Volleyball World Championship	Mexico City, Mexico
Bahamas	September 19, 1974	3–0	15–11	15–13	15–5			45–29	1974 FIVB Women's Volleyball World Championship	Mexico City, Mexico
China	September 20, 1974	0–3	5–15	1–15	5–15			11–45	1974 FIVB Women's Volleyball World Championship	Mexico City, Mexico
Brazil	September 22, 1974	0–3	0–15	3–15	3–15			6–45	1974 FIVB Women's Volleyball World Championship	Mexico City, Mexico
Czechoslovakia	September 23, 1974	0–3	8–15	10–15	10–15			28–45	1974 FIVB Women's Volleyball World Championship	Mexico City, Mexico
Bulgaria	September 24, 1974	1–3	15–13	5–15	6–15	6–15		32–58	1974 FIVB Women's Volleyball World Championship	Mexico City, Mexico
China	September 26, 1974	0–3	5–15	4–15	9–15			18–45	1974 FIVB Women's Volleyball World Championship	Mexico City, Mexico
Netherlands	September 27, 1974	0–3	10–15	6–15	4–15			20–45	1974 FIVB Women's Volleyball World Championship	Mexico City, Mexico

=== 1997 ===
Opponent	Date	Result	Set						Event	Location
Opponent	Date	Result	1	2	3	4	5	Total	Event	Location
Chinese Taipei	June 4, 1997	0–3	5–15	6–15	2–15			13–45	1998 FIVB Women's Volleyball World Championship qualification (AVC)	Suwon, South Korea
Kazakhstan	June 5, 1997	0–3	7–15	7–15	7–15			21–45	1998 FIVB Women's Volleyball World Championship qualification (AVC)	Suwon, South Korea
South Korea	June 6, 1997	0–3	4–15	8–15	4–15			16–45	1998 FIVB Women's Volleyball World Championship qualification (AVC)	Suwon, South Korea
Australia	September 21, 1997	1–3	8–15	10–15	15–8	7–15		40–53	1997 Asian Women's Volleyball Championship	Manila, Philippines
Chinese Taipei	September 23, 1997	0–3	4–15	4–15	2–15			10–45	1997 Asian Women's Volleyball Championship	Manila, Philippines
Japan	September 25, 1997	0–3	1–15	6–15	4–15			11–45	1997 Asian Women's Volleyball Championship	Manila, Philippines
Thailand	September 27, 1997	0–3	7–15	4–15	10–15			21–45	1997 Asian Women's Volleyball Championship	Manila, Philippines
Uzbekistan	September 28, 1997	0–3	6–15	8–15	13–15			27–45	1997 Asian Women's Volleyball Championship	Manila, Philippines

== 2000s ==
=== 2001 ===
Opponent	Date	Result	Set						Event	Location
Opponent	Date	Result	1	2	3	4	5	Total	Event	Location
Indonesia	September 9, 2001	3–2	25–19	22–25	11–25	26–24	16–14	100–107	2001 Southeast Asian Games	Kuala Lumpur, Malaysia
Malaysia	September 11, 2001	3–1	25–14	21–25	28–26	25–23		99–88	2001 Southeast Asian Games	Kuala Lumpur, Malaysia
Vietnam	September 15, 2001	2–3	24–26	25–21	28–30	25–20	11–15	113–112	2001 Southeast Asian Games	Kuala Lumpur, Malaysia
Indonesia	September 16, 2001	3–1	16–25	25–19	25–19	25–19		90–82	2001 Southeast Asian Games	Kuala Lumpur, Malaysia

=== 2003 ===
Opponent	Date	Result	Set						Event	Location
Opponent	Date	Result	1	2	3	4	5	Total	Event	Location
Australia	September 20, 2003	3–2	23–25	25–22	25–14	12–25	15–12	100–98	2003 Asian Women's Volleyball Championship	Ho Chi Minh, Vietnam
China	September 21, 2003	0–3	16–25	7–25	22–25			45–75	2003 Asian Women's Volleyball Championship	Ho Chi Minh, Vietnam
Kazakhstan	September 22, 2003	0–3	15–25	12–25	19–25			46–75	2003 Asian Women's Volleyball Championship	Ho Chi Minh, Vietnam
South Korea	September 24, 2003	0–3	14–25	10–25	7–25			31–75	2003 Asian Women's Volleyball Championship	Ho Chi Minh, Vietnam
Japan	September 25, 2003	0–3	16–25	23–25	17–25			56–75	2003 Asian Women's Volleyball Championship	Ho Chi Minh, Vietnam
Chinese Taipei	September 26, 2003	0–3	18–25	16–25	11–25			45–75	2003 Asian Women's Volleyball Championship	Ho Chi Minh, Vietnam
Kazakhstan	September 27, 2003	0–3	0–25	0–25	0–25			Forfeited	2003 Asian Women's Volleyball Championship	Ho Chi Minh, Vietnam
Thailand	December 2003	0–3	20–25	17–25	9–25			46–75	2003 Southeast Asian Games	Hanoi, Vietnam
Indonesia	December 2003	3–2	25–17	23–25	25–23	17–25	15–12	106–103	2003 Southeast Asian Games	Hanoi, Vietnam
Malaysia	December 2003	3–0	25–14	25–18	25–15			75–47	2003 Southeast Asian Games	Hanoi, Vietnam
Vietnam	December 2003	0–3	22–25	21–25	18–25			61–75	2003 Southeast Asian Games	Hanoi, Vietnam
Singapore	December 2003	3–0	25–21	25–13	25–19			75–53	2003 Southeast Asian Games	Hanoi, Vietnam
Vietnam	December 11, 2003	2–3	25–23	25–21	21–25	24–26	9–15	104–110	2003 Southeast Asian Games	Hanoi, Vietnam
Indonesia	December 12, 2003	3–2	21–25	25–23	25–16	20–25	17–15	108–104	2003 Southeast Asian Games	Hanoi, Vietnam

=== 2005 ===
Opponent	Date	Result	Set						Event	Location
Opponent	Date	Result	1	2	3	4	5	Total	Event	Location
Hong Kong	September 1, 2005	3–0	25–21	25–13	25–22			75–56	2005 Asian Women's Volleyball Championship	Taicang, China
North Korea	September 2, 2005	0–3	17–25	12–25	13–25			42–75	2005 Asian Women's Volleyball Championship	Taicang, China
Kazakhstan	September 3, 2005	1–3	11–25	11–25	25–22	12–25		59–97	2005 Asian Women's Volleyball Championship	Taicang, China
China	September 4, 2005	0–3	10–25	16–25	13–25			39–75	2005 Asian Women's Volleyball Championship	Taicang, China
Thailand	September 5, 2005	0–3	14–25	16–25	17–25			47–75	2005 Asian Women's Volleyball Championship	Taicang, China
India	September 6, 2005	3–1	25–21	18–25	25–17	25–18		93–81	2005 Asian Women's Volleyball Championship	Taicang, China
Australia	September 7, 2005	3–0	25–23	25–18	15–18			75–59	2005 Asian Women's Volleyball Championship	Taicang, China
Singapore	October 27, 2005	3–0	25–9	25–16	25–20			75–45	2005 Southeast Asian Games	Bacolod, Philippines
Indonesia	October 28, 2005	3–1	25–18	22–25	25–20	25–19		97–82	2005 Southeast Asian Games	Bacolod, Philippines
Vietnam	October 30, 2005	1–3	25–13	17–25	22–25	21–25		85–88	2005 Southeast Asian Games	Bacolod, Philippines
Thailand	October 31, 2005	0–3	19–25	11–25	12–25			42–75	2005 Southeast Asian Games	Bacolod, Philippines

=== 2006 ===
Opponent	Date	Result	Set						Event	Location
Opponent	Date	Result	1	2	3	4	5	Total	Event	Location
Tonga	August 1, 2006	3–0	25–13	25–16	25–15			75–44	2006 FIVB Volleyball Women's World Championship qualification (AVC)	Ratchaburi, Thailand
Kazakhstan	August 2, 2006	0–3	16–25	18–25	22–25			56–75	2006 FIVB Volleyball Women's World Championship qualification (AVC)	Ratchaburi, Thailand
Thailand	August 4, 2006	0–3	11–25	15–25	9–25			35–75	2006 FIVB Volleyball Women's World Championship qualification (AVC)	Ratchaburi, Thailand
South Korea	August 5, 2006	0–3	14–25	17–25	13–25			44–75	2006 FIVB Volleyball Women's World Championship qualification (AVC)	Ratchaburi, Thailand

== 2010s ==
=== 2013 ===
Opponent	Date	Result	Set						Event	Location
Opponent	Date	Result	1	2	3	4	5	Total	Event	Location
Vietnam	June 14, 2013	0–3	9–25	11–25	18–25			38–75	2014 FIVB Volleyball Women's World Championship qualification (AVC)	Khe Sanh, Vietnam
Myanmar	June 15, 2013	3–1	20–25	25–14	25–10	25–17		95–66	2014 FIVB Volleyball Women's World Championship qualification (AVC)	Khe Sanh, Vietnam
Indonesia	June 16, 2013	0–3	20–25	19–25	22–25			61–75	2014 FIVB Volleyball Women's World Championship qualification (AVC)	Khe Sanh, Vietnam
India	September 13, 2013	0–3	22–25	24–26	12–25			58–76	2013 Asian Women's Volleyball Championship	Nakhon Ratchasima, Thailand
Iran	September 14, 2013	1–3	25–19	20–25	18–25	15–25		78–94	2013 Asian Women's Volleyball Championship	Nakhon Ratchasima, Thailand
China	September 15, 2013	0–3	9–25	10–25	8–25			27–75	2013 Asian Women's Volleyball Championship	Nakhon Ratchasima, Thailand
Sri Lanka	September 16, 2013	3–2	19–25	25–18	19–25	25–23	15–12	103–103	2013 Asian Women's Volleyball Championship	Nakhon Ratchasima, Thailand
Myanmar	September 17, 2013	3–0	25–18	25–22	25–18			75–58	2013 Asian Women's Volleyball Championship	Nakhon Ratchasima, Thailand
Australia	September 19, 2013	0–3	22–25	15–25	23–25			60–75	2013 Asian Women's Volleyball Championship	Nakhon Ratchasima, Thailand
India	September 20, 2013	0–3	19–25	22–25	16–25			57–75	2013 Asian Women's Volleyball Championship	Nakhon Ratchasima, Thailand

=== 2015 ===
Opponent	Date	Result	Set						Event	Location
Opponent	Date	Result	1	2	3	4	5	Total	Event	Location
Australia	May 20, 2015	1–3	18–25	18–25	26–24	15–25		77–99	2015 Asian Women's Volleyball Championship	Tianjin, China
Kazakhstan	May 21, 2015	0–3	11–25	10–25	13–25			34–75	2015 Asian Women's Volleyball Championship	Tianjin, China
South Korea	May 22, 2015	0–3	8–25	7–25	8–25			23–75	2015 Asian Women's Volleyball Championship	Tianjin, China
Hong Kong	May 23, 2015	3–2	21–25	18–25	25–20	25–16	15–11	104–97	2015 Asian Women's Volleyball Championship	Tianjin, China
Sri Lanka	May 24, 2015	3–1	25–14	19–25	25–18	25–17		94–74	2015 Asian Women's Volleyball Championship	Tianjin, China
India	May 26, 2015	0–3	25–27	13–25	20–25			58–77	2015 Asian Women's Volleyball Championship	Tianjin, China
Mongolia	May 27, 2015	1–3	18–25	13–25	30–28	22–25		83–104	2015 Asian Women's Volleyball Championship	Tianjin, China
Indonesia	June 10, 2015	0–3	22–25	20–25	14–25			56–75	2015 Southeast Asian Games	Kallang, Singapore
Malaysia	June 11, 2015	3–0	25–15	25–18	25–16			75–49	2015 Southeast Asian Games	Kallang, Singapore
Vietnam	June 13, 2015	0–3	16–25	21–25	23–25			60–75	2015 Southeast Asian Games	Kallang, Singapore

=== 2017 ===
Opponent	Date	Result	Set						Event	Location
Opponent	Date	Result	1	2	3	4	5	Total	Event	Location
Hong Kong	August 9, 2017	3–0	25–21	25–16	25–17			75–54	2017 Asian Women's Volleyball Championship	Biñan, Philippines
Kazakhstan	August 11, 2017	0–3	23–25	20–25	19–25			62–75	2017 Asian Women's Volleyball Championship	Biñan, Philippines
South Korea	August 13, 2017	0–3	23–25	18–25	12–25			53–75	2017 Asian Women's Volleyball Championship	Biñan, Philippines
Vietnam	August 14, 2017	3–1	27–25	26–24	17–25	25–23		95–97	2017 Asian Women's Volleyball Championship	Biñan, Philippines
Thailand	August 15, 2017	0–3	21–25	14–25	20–25			55–75	2017 Asian Women's Volleyball Championship	Biñan, Philippines
Chinese Taipei	August 16, 2017	0–3	19–25	20–25	19–25			59–75	2017 Asian Women's Volleyball Championship	Biñan, Philippines
Kazakhstan	August 17, 2017	2–3	20–25	16–25	25–21	25–21	3–15	89–107	2017 Asian Women's Volleyball Championship	Biñan, Philippines
Malaysia	August 23, 2017	3–0	25–18	25–11	25–16			75–45	2017 Southeast Asian Games	Kuala Lumpur, Malaysia
Vietnam	August 25, 2017	0–3	24–26	12–25	23–25			59–76	2017 Southeast Asian Games	Kuala Lumpur, Malaysia
Thailand	August 26, 2017	0–3	21–25	17–25	17–25			55–75	2017 Southeast Asian Games	Kuala Lumpur, Malaysia
Vietnam	August 27, 2017	1–3	27–25	22–25	20–25	21–25		90–100	2017 Southeast Asian Games	Kuala Lumpur, Malaysia

=== 2018 ===
Opponent	Date	Result	Set						Event	Location
Opponent	Date	Result	1	2	3	4	5	Total	Event	Location
Thailand	August 19, 2018	0–3	22–25	12–25	15–25			49–75	2018 Asian Games	Jakarta, Indonesia
Japan	August 21, 2018	0–3	12–25	15–25	21–25			48–75	2018 Asian Games	Jakarta, Indonesia
Hong Kong	August 23, 2018	3–0	25–18	25–21	25–22			75–61	2018 Asian Games	Jakarta, Indonesia
Indonesia	August 25, 2018	1–3	20–25	20–25	26–24	22–25		88–99	2018 Asian Games	Jakarta, Indonesia
China	August 29, 2018	0–3	15–25	9–25	7–25			31–75	2018 Asian Games	Jakarta, Indonesia
Kazakhstan	August 31, 2018	2–3	11–25	25–22	15–25	25–19	14–16	90–107	2018 Asian Games	Jakarta, Indonesia
Indonesia	September 1, 2018	1–3	17–25	25–23	19–25	20–25		81–98	2018 Asian Games	Jakarta, Indonesia
Australia	September 16, 2018	2–3	25–21	25–21	24–26	16–25	10–15	100–108	2018 Asian Women's Volleyball Cup	Nakhon Ratchasima, Thailand
Iran	September 17, 2018	2–3	29–27	16–25	25–17	12–25	13–15	95–109	2018 Asian Women's Volleyball Cup	Nakhon Ratchasima, Thailand
Kazakhstan	September 18, 2018	3–1	25–22	25–23	20–25	25–17		95–87	2018 Asian Women's Volleyball Cup	Nakhon Ratchasima, Thailand
South Korea	September 21, 2018	1–3	13–25	26–24	7–25	21–25		67–99	2018 Asian Women's Volleyball Cup	Nakhon Ratchasima, Thailand
Kazakhstan	September 22, 2018	3–2	25–13	23–25	25–22	17–25	15–8	105–93	2018 Asian Women's Volleyball Cup	Nakhon Ratchasima, Thailand

=== 2019 ===
Opponent	Date	Result	Set						WR Pts.^{[2]}	Event	Location
Opponent	Date	Result	1	2	3	4	5	Total	WR Pts.^{[2]}	Event	Location
Indonesia	September 20, 2019	2–3	21–25	28–26	25–12	18–25	9–15	101–103	—N/a	2019 ASEAN Grand Prix – First Leg	Nakhon Ratchasima, Thailand
Thailand	September 21, 2019	1–3	13–25	21–25	25–23	20–25		79–98	—N/a	2019 ASEAN Grand Prix – First Leg	Nakhon Ratchasima, Thailand
Vietnam	September 22, 2019	3–2	25–21	22–25	25–21	15–25	15–12	102–104	—N/a	2019 ASEAN Grand Prix – First Leg	Nakhon Ratchasima, Thailand
Vietnam	October 4, 2019	3–0	25–21	25–23	25–21			75–65	—N/a	2019 ASEAN Grand Prix – Second Leg	Santa Rosa, Philippines
Thailand	October 5, 2019	0–3	12–25	16–25	10–25			38–75	—N/a	2019 ASEAN Grand Prix – Second Leg	Santa Rosa, Philippines
Indonesia	October 6, 2019	1–3	21–25	17–25	25–22	21–25		84–97	—N/a	2019 ASEAN Grand Prix – Second Leg	Santa Rosa, Philippines
Vietnam	December 3, 2019	2–3	25–21	23–25	19–25	25–20	8–15	100–106	—N/a	2019 Southeast Asian Games	Pasig, Philippines
Thailand	December 5, 2019	0–3	16–25	22–25	32–34			70–84	—N/a	2019 Southeast Asian Games	Pasig, Philippines
Indonesia	December 7, 2019	1–3	25–22	26–28	22–25	14–25		87–100	—N/a	2019 Southeast Asian Games	Pasig, Philippines
Indonesia	December 9, 2019	2–3	20–25	26–24	15–25	25–20	14–16	100–110	—N/a	2019 Southeast Asian Games	Pasig, Philippines

== 2020s ==
=== 2021 ===
Opponent	Date	Result	Set						WR Pts.^{[2]}	Event	Location
Opponent	Date	Result	1	2	3	4	5	Total	WR Pts.^{[2]}	Event	Location
Malaysia	May 13, 2022	3–0	25–14	25–20	25–15			75–49	—N/a	2021 Southeast Asian Games	Quảng Ninh, Vietnam
Thailand	May 14, 2022	0–3	15–25	13–25	14–25			42–75	—N/a	2021 Southeast Asian Games	Quảng Ninh, Vietnam
Indonesia	May 17, 2022	1–3	23–25	25–21	15–25	20–25		83–96	—N/a	2021 Southeast Asian Games	Quảng Ninh, Vietnam
Vietnam	May 19, 2022	0–3	23–25	19–25	17–25			59–75	—N/a	2021 Southeast Asian Games	Quảng Ninh, Vietnam
Indonesia	May 21, 2022	1–3	21–25	25–22	19–25	21–25		86–97	—N/a	2021 Southeast Asian Games	Quảng Ninh, Vietnam
Kazakhstan	Cancelled	–	–	–	–			–	—N/a	2021 Asian Women's Volleyball Championship	Central Luzon, Philippines^{[3]}
Chinese Taipei	Cancelled	–	–	–	–			–	—N/a	2021 Asian Women's Volleyball Championship	Central Luzon, Philippines^{[3]}
Uzbekistan	Cancelled	–	–	–	–			–	—N/a	2021 Asian Women's Volleyball Championship	Central Luzon, Philippines^{[3]}

=== 2022 ===
Opponent	Date	Result	Set						WR Pts.^{[2]}	Event	Location
Opponent	Date	Result	1	2	3	4	5	Total	WR Pts.^{[2]}	Event	Location
Vietnam	August 21, 2022	0–3	19–25	17–25	29–31			65–81	—N/a	2022 Asian Women's Volleyball Cup	Pasig, Philippine
China	August 23, 2022	0–3	16–25	22–25	20–25			58–75	—N/a	2022 Asian Women's Volleyball Cup	Pasig, Philippine
Iran	August 24, 2022	3–1	25–19	25–22	20–25	25–14		95–80	—N/a	2022 Asian Women's Volleyball Cup	Pasig, Philippine
South Korea	August 25, 2022	3–0	25–18	25–13	25–17			75–48	—N/a	2022 Asian Women's Volleyball Cup	Pasig, Philippine
Thailand	August 27, 2022	1–3	18–25	25–23	20–25	9–25		72–98	—N/a	2022 Asian Women's Volleyball Cup	Pasig, Philippine
Australia	August 28, 2022	3–2	21–25	25–19	19–25	25–18	15–12	105–99	—N/a	2022 Asian Women's Volleyball Cup	Pasig, Philippine
Chinese Taipei	August 29, 2022	0–3	26–28	21–25	21–25			68–78	—N/a	2022 Asian Women's Volleyball Cup	Pasig, Philippine
Thailand	September 9, 2022	0–3	17–25	22–25	12–25			51–75	—N/a	2022 ASEAN Grand Prix	Nakhon Ratchasima, Thailand
Vietnam	September 10, 2022	0–3	12–25	16–25	16–25			44–75	—N/a	2022 ASEAN Grand Prix	Nakhon Ratchasima, Thailand
Indonesia	September 11, 2022	0–3	24–26	22–25	23–25			69–76	—N/a	2022 ASEAN Grand Prix	Nakhon Ratchasima, Thailand

=== 2023 ===
Opponent	Date	Result	Set						WR Pts.^{[2]}	Event	Location
Opponent	Date	Result	1	2	3	4	5	Total	WR Pts.^{[2]}	Event	Location
Cambodia	May 9, 2023	3–0	25–5	25–5	25–5			75–15	—N/a	2023 Southeast Asian Games	Phnom Penh, Cambodia
Vietnam	May 10, 2023	0–3	20–25	17–25	19–25			56–75	—N/a	2023 Southeast Asian Games	Phnom Penh, Cambodia
Singapore	May 11, 2023	3–0	25–17	25–14	25–13			75–44	—N/a	2023 Southeast Asian Games	Phnom Penh, Cambodia
Thailand	May 13, 2023	0–3	22–25	9–25	12–25			43–75	—N/a	2023 Southeast Asian Games	Phnom Penh, Cambodia
Indonesia	May 14, 2023	1–3	20–25	25–22	22–25	23–25		90–97	—N/a	2023 Southeast Asian Games	Phnom Penh, Cambodia
Macau	June 19, 2023	3–0	25–14	25–12	25–9			75–35	+2.46	2023 AVC Women's Challenge Cup	Gresik, Indonesia
Indonesia	June 20, 2023	0–3	17–25	20–25	10–25			47–75	-2.69	2023 AVC Women's Challenge Cup	Gresik, Indonesia
India	June 21, 2023	3–2	25–22	26–28	11–25	29–27	18–16	109–118	+1.24	2023 AVC Women's Challenge Cup	Gresik, Indonesia
Australia	June 23, 2023	1–3	18–25	22–25	25–21	20–25		85–96	-1.76	2023 AVC Women's Challenge Cup	Gresik, Indonesia
Iran	June 24, 2023	0–3	20–25	13–25	16–25			49–75	-2.65	2023 AVC Women's Challenge Cup	Gresik, Indonesia
Uzbekistan	June 25, 2023	3–1	25–14	13–25	25–18	25–18		88–75	+1.82	2023 AVC Women's Challenge Cup	Gresik, Indonesia
Vietnam	August 4, 2023	1–3	15–25	25–19	21–25	9–25		70–94	—N/a	2023 SEA Women's V.League – First Leg	Vĩnh Phúc, Vietnam
Thailand	August 5, 2023	0–3	19–25	7–25	17–25			43–75	—N/a	2023 SEA Women's V.League – First Leg	Vĩnh Phúc, Vietnam
Indonesia	August 6, 2023	0–3	20–25	17–25	21–25			58–75	—N/a	2023 SEA Women's V.League – First Leg	Vĩnh Phúc, Vietnam
Thailand	August 11, 2023	0–3	15–25	17–25	18–25			50–75	—N/a	2023 SEA Women's V.League – Second Leg	Chiang Mai, Thailand
Vietnam	August 12, 2023	1–3	19–25	27–25	29–31	14–25		89–106	—N/a	2023 SEA Women's V.League – Second Leg	Chiang Mai, Thailand
Indonesia	August 13, 2023	1–3	25–22	21–25	22–25	24–26		92–98	—N/a	2023 SEA Women's V.League – Second Leg	Chiang Mai, Thailand
Kazakhstan	August 30, 2023	2–3	25–21	17–25	24–26	27–25	15–6	108–103	-2.52	2023 Asian Women's Volleyball Championship	Nakhon Ratchasima, Thailand
China	August 31, 2023	0–3	15–25	20–25	17–25			52–75	-0.29	2023 Asian Women's Volleyball Championship	Nakhon Ratchasima, Thailand
Hong Kong	September 1, 2023	0–3	21–25	21–25	11–25			53–75	-9.18	2023 Asian Women's Volleyball Championship	Nakhon Ratchasima, Thailand
Iran	September 3, 2023	2–3	25–22	22–25	21–25	26–24	12–15	106–111	-4.36	2023 Asian Women's Volleyball Championship	Nakhon Ratchasima, Thailand
Uzbekistan	September 5, 2023	3–0	25–20	25–17	25–23			75–60	+7.83	2023 Asian Women's Volleyball Championship	Nakhon Ratchasima, Thailand

=== 2024 ===
Opponent	Date	Result	Set						WR Pts.^{[2]}	Event	Location
Opponent	Date	Result	1	2	3	4	5	Total	WR Pts.^{[2]}	Event	Location
Australia	May 23, 2024	3–1	22–25	25–19	25–16	25–21		97–81	+1.97	2024 AVC Women's Challenge Cup	Manila, Philippines
India	May 24, 2024	3–1	22–25	25–21	25–17	25–18		97–81	+1.93	2024 AVC Women's Challenge Cup	Manila, Philippines
Iran	May 25, 2024	3–0	25–16	25–13	25–15			75–44	+2.54	2024 AVC Women's Challenge Cup	Manila, Philippines
Chinese Taipei	May 26, 2024	3–0	25–13	25–21	25–18			75–52	+2.99	2024 AVC Women's Challenge Cup	Manila, Philippines
Kazakhstan	May 28, 2024	0–3	23–25	21–25	14–25			58–75	-1.60	2024 AVC Women's Challenge Cup	Manila, Philippines
Australia	May 29, 2024	3–0	25–23	25–15	25–7			75–45	+2.48	2024 AVC Women's Challenge Cup	Manila, Philippines
Vietnam	July 5, 2024	0–3	14–25	22–25	21–25			57–75	-3.45	2024 FIVB Women's Volleyball Challenger Cup	Manila, Philippines
Vietnam	August 2, 2024	1–3	23–25	25–20	22–25	21–25		91–95	—N/a	2024 SEA Women's V.League – First Leg	Vĩnh Phúc, Vietnam
Thailand	August 3, 2024	0–3	12–25	18–25	10–25			40–75	—N/a	2024 SEA Women's V.League – First Leg	Vĩnh Phúc, Vietnam
Indonesia	August 4, 2024	3–1	25–23	15–25	25–23	25–21		90–92	—N/a	2024 SEA Women's V.League – First Leg	Vĩnh Phúc, Vietnam
Thailand	August 9, 2024	0–3	18–25	23–25	16–25			57–75	—N/a	2024 SEA Women's V.League – Second Leg	Nakhon Ratchasima, Thailand
Vietnam	August 10, 2024	0–3	16–25	20–25	22–25			58–75	—N/a	2024 SEA Women's V.League – Second Leg	Nakhon Ratchasima, Thailand
Indonesia	August 11, 2024	3–2	20–25	25–20	16–25	25–20	15–10	101–100	—N/a	2024 SEA Women's V.League – Second Leg	Nakhon Ratchasima, Thailand

=== 2025 ===
Opponent	Date	Result	Set						WR Pts.^{[2]}	Event	Location
Opponent	Date	Result	1	2	3	4	5	Total	WR Pts.^{[2]}	Event	Location
Mongolia	June 7, 2025	3–0	25–18	25–16	25–14			75–48	+6.54	2025 AVC Women's Volleyball Nations Cup	Hanoi, Vietnam
Indonesia	June 8, 2025	3–1	22–25	25–23	25–13	28–26		100–87	+5.12	2025 AVC Women's Volleyball Nations Cup	Hanoi, Vietnam
Iran	June 9, 2025	2–3	25–16	21–25	26–24	23–25	13–15	108–105	-4.04	2025 AVC Women's Volleyball Nations Cup	Hanoi, Vietnam
New Zealand	June 11, 2025	3–0	25–17	25–21	25–18			75–56	+7.72	2025 AVC Women's Volleyball Nations Cup	Hanoi, Vietnam
Kazakhstan	June 12, 2025	3–0	25–21	25–15	25–19			75–55	+10.20	2025 AVC Women's Volleyball Nations Cup	Hanoi, Vietnam
Chinese Taipei	June 13, 2025	3–2	25–17	25–21	18–25	15–25	15–12	98–100	+4.46	2025 AVC Women's Volleyball Nations Cup	Hanoi, Vietnam
Vietnam	June 14, 2025	0–3	15–25	17–25	14–25			46–75	-5.01	2025 AVC Women's Volleyball Nations Cup	Hanoi, Vietnam
Thailand	August 1, 2025	1–3	25–17	24–26	20–25	20–25		89–93	—N/a	2025 SEA Women's V.League – First Leg^{[4]}	Nakhon Ratchasima, Thailand
Vietnam	August 2, 2025	1–3	13–25	21–25	25–23	9–25		68–98	-2.59	2025 SEA Women's V.League – First Leg^{[4]}	Nakhon Ratchasima, Thailand
Indonesia	August 3, 2025	3–1	25–20	25–20	16–25	25–13		91–78	+4.97	2025 SEA Women's V.League – First Leg^{[4]}	Nakhon Ratchasima, Thailand
Vietnam	August 8, 2025	0–3	14–25	28–30	22–25			64–80	-4.46	2025 SEA Women's V.League – Second Leg^{[4]}	Ninh Bình, Vietnam
Thailand	August 9, 2025	1–3	22–25	17–25	26–24	16–25		81–99	—N/a	2025 SEA Women's V.League – Second Leg^{[4]}	Ninh Bình, Vietnam
Indonesia	August 10, 2025	3–0	25–17	25–17	28–26			78–60	+6.46	2025 SEA Women's V.League – Second Leg^{[4]}	Ninh Bình, Vietnam
Thailand	December 11, 2025	0–3	11–25	17–25	16–25			44–75	—N/a	2025 Southeast Asian Games	Bangkok, Thailand
Singapore	December 12, 2025	3–0	25–13	25–8	25–18			75–39	—N/a	2025 Southeast Asian Games	Bangkok, Thailand
Vietnam	December 14, 2025	0–3	17–25	14–25	17–25			48–75	—N/a	2025 Southeast Asian Games	Bangkok, Thailand
Indonesia	December 15, 2025	1–3	26–28	25–13	28–30	24–26		103–97	—N/a	2025 Southeast Asian Games	Bangkok, Thailand

=== 2026 ===
Opponent	Date	Result	Set						WR Pts.^{[2]}	Event	Location
Opponent	Date	Result	1	2	3	4	5	Total	WR Pts.^{[2]}	Event	Location
Uzbekistan	June 6, 2026	3–0	25–16	25–12	25–14			75–42	+4.85	2026 AVC Women's Volleyball Cup	Candon, Philippines
Australia	June 7, 2026	2–3	22–25	25–23	25–18	15–25	11–15	98–106	-5.8	2026 AVC Women's Volleyball Cup	Candon, Philippines
Kyrgyzstan	June 8, 2026	3–0	25–9	25–11	25–17			75–37	+6.03	2026 AVC Women's Volleyball Cup	Candon, Philippines
South Korea	June 9, 2026	0–3	16–25	18–25	22–25			56–75	-6.32	2026 AVC Women's Volleyball Cup	Candon, Philippines
Chinese Taipei	June 11, 2026	0–3	16–25	14–25	10–25			40–75	-5.94	2026 AVC Women's Volleyball Cup	Candon, Philippines
Iran	June 14, 2026	0–3	21–25	12–25	21–25			54–75	-6.64	2026 AVC Women's Volleyball Cup	Candon, Philippines
Vietnam	July 31, 2026	1–3	27–29	17–25	25–20	19–25		88–99	-1.57	2026 SEA Women's V Cup – First Leg	Hanoi, Vietnam
Thailand	August 1, 2026	2–3	17–25	25–19	15–25	25–18	10–15	92–102	—N/a	2026 SEA Women's V Cup – First Leg	Hanoi, Vietnam
Indonesia	August 2, 2026	1–3	25–20	19–25	22–25	16–25		82–95	-3.75	2026 SEA Women's V Cup – First Leg	Hanoi, Vietnam
Thailand	August 7, 2026	0–3	19–25	17–25	19–25			55–75	—N/a	2026 SEA Women's V Cup – Second Leg	Chiang Mai, Thailand
Vietnam	August 8, 2026	3–1	22–25	25–23	25–21	25–22		97–91	+6.02	2026 SEA Women's V Cup – Second Leg	Chiang Mai, Thailand
Indonesia	August 9, 2026	3–1	25–13	23–25	25–19	33–31		106–88	+3.93	2026 SEA Women's V Cup – Second Leg	Chiang Mai, Thailand
China	September 16, 2026								—N/a	2026 Asian Games	Komaki and Okazaki, Japan
Kazakhstan	September 17, 2026								—N/a	2026 Asian Games	Komaki and Okazaki, Japan
Qatar	September 20, 2026								—N/a	2026 Asian Games	Komaki and Okazaki, Japan
Mongolia	September 21, 2026								—N/a	2026 Asian Games	Komaki and Okazaki, Japan
Hong Kong	September 22, 2026								—N/a	2026 Asian Games	Komaki and Okazaki, Japan

== Head-to-head record ==
This page shows the Philippine women's national volleyball team's head-to-head record from 2000 to present.

Head-to-head record
Opponent	GP	MW	ML	SW	SL	LM
Australia	10	4	6	21	20	June 7, 2026
Cambodia	1	1	0	3	0	May 9, 2023
China	6	0	6	0	18	August 31, 2023
Chinese Taipei	6	2	4	6	14	June 11, 2026
Hong Kong	5	4	1	12	5	September 1, 2023
India	6	3	3	9	13	May 24, 2024
Indonesia	26	10	16	44	60	August 2, 2026
Iran	8	3	5	13	19	June 14, 2026
Japan	1	0	1	0	3	August 21, 2018
Kazakhstan	13	3	10	19	33	June 12, 2025
Kyrgyzstan	1	1	0	3	0	June 8, 2026
Macau	1	1	0	3	0	June 19, 2023
Malaysia	5	5	0	15	1	May 13, 2022
Mongolia	2	1	1	4	3	June 7, 2025
Myanmar	2	2	0	6	1	September 17, 2013
New Zealand	1	1	0	3	0	June 11, 2025
North Korea	1	0	1	0	3	September 2, 2005
Singapore	4	4	0	12	0	December 12, 2025
South Korea	7	1	6	4	18	June 9, 2026
Sri Lanka	2	2	0	6	3	May 24, 2015
Thailand	22	0	22	6	66	August 1, 2026
Tonga	1	1	0	3	0	August 1, 2006
Vietnam	26	3	23	22	72	July 31, 2026
Uzbekistan	3	3	0	9	1	June 6, 2026

== Invitational tournaments and exhibition games results ==
Opponent	Date	Result	Set						Event	Location
Opponent	Date	Result	1	2	3	4	5	Total	Event	Location
Vietnam	July 25, 2015	0–3	16–25	18–25	15–25			49–75	2015 VTV International Women's Volleyball Cup	Bạc Liêu, Vietnam
Thailand U23	July 26, 2015	0–3	10–25	13–25	21–25			44–75	2015 VTV International Women's Volleyball Cup	Bạc Liêu, Vietnam
(North Korea) April 25 S.C.	July 28, 2015	0–3	4–25	13–25	16–25			33–75	2015 VTV International Women's Volleyball Cup	Bạc Liêu, Vietnam
(China) Nanjing University	July 28, 2015	3–2	18–25	20–25	25–19	25–23	15–12	103–104	2015 VTV International Women's Volleyball Cup	Bạc Liêu, Vietnam
(China) Liaoning V.C.	July 29, 2015	0–3	22–25	17–25	15–25			54–75	2015 VTV International Women's Volleyball Cup	Bạc Liêu, Vietnam
(China) Nanjing University	July 31, 2015	1–3	25–23	14–25	18–25	8–25		65–98	2015 VTV International Women's Volleyball Cup	Bạc Liêu, Vietnam
(Japan) Okayama Seagulls	July 19, 2017	3–0	25–22	25–17	25–14	–	–	75–53	Exhibition game	Okayama, Japan
(Brazil) São Caetano	April 14, 2022	1–4	20–25	17–25	20–25	29–27	9–15	95–117	Exhibition game	São Caetano do Sul, Brazil
(Brazil) Barueri U21	April 20, 2022	4–0	33–31	26–24	25–20	25–17		109–92	Exhibition game	Barueri, Brazil
(Brazil) Barueri U21	April 21, 2022	3–1	25–11	22–25	25–13	26–24		98–63	Exhibition game	Barueri, Brazil
Thailand	June 11, 2022	0–3	13–25	10–25	16–25			39–75	PNVF International Challenge	San Juan, Philippines
Japan	June 12, 2022	0–4	14–25	9–25	23–25	19–25		65–100	PNVF International Challenge	San Juan, Philippines
(Japan) Victorina Himeji	April 15, 2023	1–3	21–25	25–19	13–25	22–25	–	81–94	Exhibition game	Himeji, Japan
(Japan) Ashiya University	April 24, 2023	3–1	25–17	25–17	21–25	25–18		96–77	Exhibition game	Ashiya, Japan
(Japan) Sonoda Women's University	April 25, 2023	4–1	25–21	25–21	25–22	25–17	13–15	113–96	Exhibition game	Amagasaki, Japan
(Japan) Mukogawa Women's University	April 26, 2023	2–2	25–19	25–22	23–25	23–25		96–91	Exhibition game	Nishinomiya, Japan
(Japan) Kobe Shinwa Women's University	April 27, 2023	1–4	15–25	23–25	25–22	9–25	13–15	86–107	Exhibition game	Kobe, Japan
(South Korea) Powerful Daegu	June 7, 2024	2–3	26–24	23–25	23–25	25–16	8–15	105–105	Serve-Spike Unite! (Exhibition game)	Daegu, South Korea
(Japan) Saga Hisamitsu Springs	September 7, 2024	0–3	19–25	16–25	16-25			51–75	Alas Pilipinas Invitationals (Exhibition game)	Pasig, Philippines
(Japan) Saga Hisamitsu Springs	September 8, 2024	0–3	14–25	21–25	19–25			54–75	Alas Pilipinas Invitationals (Exhibition game)	Pasig, Philippines
Vietnam	June 29, 2025	0–3	20–25	21–25	21–25			62–75	2025 VTV International Women's Volleyball Cup	Phú Thọ, Vietnam
(China) Sichuan Wuliangchun	June 30, 2025	3–1	25–12	25–22	19–25	25–15		94–74	2025 VTV International Women's Volleyball Cup	Phú Thọ, Vietnam
Australia	July 1, 2025	3–0	25–13	25–15	25–20			75–48	2025 VTV International Women's Volleyball Cup	Phú Thọ, Vietnam
(Thailand) Est Cola	July 3, 2025	3–0	25–17	25–21	25–21			75–59	2025 VTV International Women's Volleyball Cup	Phú Thọ, Vietnam
(Russia) Korabelka	July 4, 2025	1–3	16–25	27–25	17–25	22–25		82–100	2025 VTV International Women's Volleyball Cup	Phú Thọ, Vietnam
Chinese Taipei	July 5, 2025	0–3	17–25	24–26	22–25			63–76	2025 VTV International Women's Volleyball Cup	Phú Thọ, Vietnam

== See also ==
- Philippines men's national volleyball team results and fixtures
- Philippines national volleyball teams in FIVB club tournaments

== Notes ==
^[1] This is a separate event from the traditional 6-man volleyball. This was the first and last Women's Nine-a-side volleyball event at the 1962 Asian Games.
^[2] The new calculation method of the FIVB Senior World Rankings was implemented on February 1, 2020 where every match results in any annual FIVB-sanctioned event from January 1, 2019 is taken into account of a country's rating in the World Rankings.
^[3] Three cities from Central Luzon were supposed to host the event — San Fernando, Olongapo (Subic), and Angeles (Clark)
^[4] Starting in 2025, the new FIVB Senior World Rankings calculation now includes annual zonal events held in any confederation. Hence, the SEA V.League is now a sanctioned event where Southeast Asian countries can garner world ranking points.
