= Philippines men's national volleyball team results and fixtures =

The following is a list of fixtures and results of the Philippines men's national volleyball team against other national teams, as well as foreign club sides.

== 1950s to 1990s ==
=== 1958 ===
Opponent	Date	Result	Set						Event	Location
Opponent	Date	Result	1	2	3	4	5	Total	Event	Location
Iran	May 25, 1958	2–3	12–15	15–13	15–8	13–15	2–15	57–66	1958 Asian Games	Tokyo, Japan
Hong Kong	May 27, 1958	3–2	13–15	15–7	15–6	13–15	15–11	64–61	1958 Asian Games	Tokyo, Japan
Japan	May 28, 1958	1–3	11–15	15–13	10–15	13–15		49–58	1958 Asian Games	Tokyo, Japan
India	May 31, 1958	0–3	3–15	9–15	1–15			13–45	1958 Asian Games	Tokyo, Japan
Japan	May 25, 1958	0–3	15–21	14–21	13–21			42–63	1962 Asian Games – Nine-a-side^{[1]}	Tokyo, Japan
Hong Kong	May 26, 1958	0–3	21–23	14–21	19–21			54–65	1962 Asian Games – Nine-a-side^{[1]}	Tokyo, Japan
Taiwan	May 29, 1958	0–3	?–?	?–?	?–?			?–?	1962 Asian Games – Nine-a-side^{[1]}	Tokyo, Japan
South Korea	May 31, 1958	2–3	18–21	20–22	21–17	21–19	18–21	100–98	1962 Asian Games – Nine-a-side^{[1]}	Tokyo, Japan

=== 1962 ===
Opponent	Date	Result	Set						Event	Location
Opponent	Date	Result	1	2	3	4	5	Total	Event	Location
Pakistan	August 26, 1962	2–3	9–15	15–12	7–15	15–9	11–15	57–66	1962 Asian Games	Jakarta, Indonesia
Japan	August 27, 1962	0–3	4–15	6–15	3–15			13–45	1962 Asian Games	Jakarta, Indonesia
Cambodia	August 29, 1962	0–3	13–15	5–15	14–16			32–46	1962 Asian Games	Jakarta, Indonesia
Thailand^{[2]}	August 30, 1962	0–3	0–15	0–15	0–15			0–45	1962 Asian Games	Jakarta, Indonesia
Singapore	August 25, 1962	3–0	21–10	21–7	21–11			63–28	1962 Asian Games – Nine-a-side^{[1]}	Jakarta, Indonesia
Malaya	August 27, 1962	3–0	21–18	21–10	21–10			63–38	1962 Asian Games – Nine-a-side^{[1]}	Jakarta, Indonesia
Indonesia	August 30, 1962	3–2	21–15	23–25	16–21	16–21	21–18	99–98	1962 Asian Games – Nine-a-side^{[1]}	Jakarta, Indonesia
Japan	August 30, 1962	1–3	8–21	21–15	5–21	9–21		43–78	1962 Asian Games – Nine-a-side^{[1]}	Jakarta, Indonesia
South Korea	August 30, 1962	1–3	22–20	6–21	15–21	17–21		60–83	1962 Asian Games – Nine-a-side^{[1]}	Jakarta, Indonesia

=== 1966 ===
Opponent	Date	Result	Set						Event	Location
Opponent	Date	Result	1	2	3	4	5	Total	Event	Location
India	December 10, 1966	1–3	?–?	?–?	?–?	?–?		?–?	1966 Asian Games	Bangkok, Thailand
Thailand	December 11, 1966	1–3	?–?	?–?	?–?	?–?		?–?	1966 Asian Games	Bangkok, Thailand
Malaysia	December 12, 1966	3–2	15–6	11–15	15–3	12–15	15–1	68–40	1966 Asian Games	Bangkok, Thailand
South Vietnam	December 13, 1966	3–0	?–?	?–?	?–?			?–?	1966 Asian Games	Bangkok, Thailand
Ceylon	December 15, 1966	3–0	?–?	?–?	?–?			?–?	1966 Asian Games	Bangkok, Thailand
Taiwan	December 16, 1966	0–3	?–?	?–?	?–?			?–?	1966 Asian Games	Bangkok, Thailand
Pakistan^{[3]}	December 15, 1966	3–0	15–0	15–0	15–0			45–0	1966 Asian Games	Bangkok, Thailand

=== 1974 ===
Opponent	Date	Result	Set						Event	Location
Opponent	Date	Result	1	2	3	4	5	Total	Event	Location
Japan	September 2, 1974	0–3	0–15	6–15	5–15			11–45	1974 Asian Games	Tehran, Iran
China	September 4, 1974	1–3	16–14	4–15	5–15	6–15		31–59	1974 Asian Games	Tehran, Iran
India	September 6, 1974	1–3	15–8	2–15	3–15	9–15		29–53	1974 Asian Games	Tehran, Iran
Pakistan	December 15, 1966	3–1	15–7	14–16	15–11	15–10		59–44	1974 Asian Games	Tehran, Iran
India	September 6, 1974	1–3	2–15	15–13	6–15	1–15		24–58	1974 Asian Games	Tehran, Iran

=== 1975 ===
Opponent	Date	Result	Set						Event	Location
Opponent	Date	Result	1	2	3	4	5	Total	Event	Location
Australia	August 17, 1975	2–3	12–15	13–15	15–8	15–6	10–15	65–59	1975 Asian Championship	Melbourne, Australia
New Zealand	August 19, 1975	3–0	15–2	15–9	17–15			47–26	1975 Asian Championship	Melbourne, Australia
South Korea	August 20, 1975	0–3	4–15	4–15	0–15			8–45	1975 Asian Championship	Melbourne, Australia
China	August 21, 1975	0–3	11–15	9–15	6–15			26–45	1975 Asian Championship	Melbourne, Australia
Japan	August 24, 1975	0–3	3–15	5–15	3–15			11–45	1975 Asian Championship	Melbourne, Australia
Indonesia	August 19, 1975	3–0	?–?	?–?	?–?			?–?	1975 Asian Championship	Melbourne, Australia

=== 1983 ===
Opponent	Date	Result	Set						Event	Location
Opponent	Date	Result	1	2	3	4	5	Total	Event	Location
Malaysia	May 29, 1983	3–1	?–?	?–?	?–?	?–?		?–?	1983 Southeast Asian Games	Singapore
Brunei	May 29, 1983	3–0	?–?	?–?	?–?			?–?	1983 Southeast Asian Games	Singapore
Singapore	June 1, 1983	2–3	?–?	?–?	?–?	?–?	?–?	?–?	1983 Southeast Asian Games	Singapore
Myanmar	June 3, 1983	1–3	4–15	6–15	15–13	3–15		28–58	1983 Southeast Asian Games	Singapore
Singapore	June 4, 1983	3–0	15–10	15–5	15–6			45–21	1983 Southeast Asian Games	Singapore

=== 1993 ===
Opponent	Date	Result	Set						Event	Location
Opponent	Date	Result	1	2	3	4	5	Total	Event	Location
Australia	September 11, 1993	0–3	10–15	0–15	2–15			12–45	1993 Asian Championship	Nakhon Ratchasima, Thailand
Bangladesh	September 13, 1993	3–?	?–?	?–?	?–?			?–?	1993 Asian Championship	Nakhon Ratchasima, Thailand
China	September 14, 1993	0–3	?–?	?–?	?–?			?–?	1993 Asian Championship	Nakhon Ratchasima, Thailand
Qatar	September 15, 1993	1–3	6–15	15–12	12–15	10–15		43–57	1993 Asian Championship	Nakhon Ratchasima, Thailand
New Zealand	September 1993	0–3	?–?	?–?	?–?			?–?	1993 Asian Championship	Nakhon Ratchasima, Thailand
Sri Lanka	September 1993	?–3	?–?	?–?	?–?			?–?	1993 Asian Championship	Nakhon Ratchasima, Thailand

=== 1997 ===
Opponent	Date	Result	Set						Event	Location
Opponent	Date	Result	1	2	3	4	5	Total	Event	Location
Australia	September 3, 1997	0–3	12–15	5–15	8–15			25–45	1997 Asian Championship	Doha, Qatar
Uzbekistan	September 5, 1997	3–?	?–?	?–?	?–?			?–?	1997 Asian Championship	Doha, Qatar
Thailand	September 1997	?–3	?–?	?–?	?–?			?–?	1997 Asian Championship	Doha, Qatar
India	September 1997	?–3	?–?	?–?	?–?			?–?	1997 Asian Championship	Doha, Qatar
Sri Lanka	September 1997	3–?	?–?	?–?	?–?			?–?	1997 Asian Championship	Doha, Qatar
Macau	September 1997	?–3	?–?	?–?	?–?			?–?	1997 Asian Championship	Doha, Qatar

== 2000s ==
=== 2003 ===
Opponent	Date	Result	Set						Event	Location
Opponent	Date	Result	1	2	3	4	5	Total	Event	Location
Indonesia	December 2003	1–3	22–25	19–25	25–23	21–25		87–98	2003 Southeast Asian Games	Hanoi, Vietnam
Thailand	December 2003	0–3	18–25	16–25	17–25			51–75	2003 Southeast Asian Games	Hanoi, Vietnam
Malaysia	December 2003	1–3	25–13	20–25	22–25	22–25		89–88	2003 Southeast Asian Games	Hanoi, Vietnam
Laos	December 11, 2003	3–0	25–22	25–13	25–11			75–46	2003 Southeast Asian Games	Hanoi, Vietnam
Malaysia	December 12, 2003	3–0	25–23	25–19	25–20			75–62	2003 Southeast Asian Games	Hanoi, Vietnam

=== 2005 ===
Opponent	Date	Result	Set						Event	Location
Opponent	Date	Result	1	2	3	4	5	Total	Event	Location
Macau	March 2, 2005	3–0	25–13	25–17	25–19			75–49	2006 FIVB World Championship qualification (AVC)	Cebu City, Philippines
Chinese Taipei	March 3, 2005	0–3	21–25	14–25	20–25			55–75	2006 FIVB World Championship qualification (AVC)	Cebu City, Philippines
Indonesia	March 5, 2005	0–3	15–25	20–25	20–25			55–75	2006 FIVB World Championship qualification (AVC)	Cebu City, Philippines
Tonga	March 2, 2005	3–2	25–27	25–20	23–25	25–21	15–12	113–105	2006 FIVB World Championship qualification (AVC)	Cebu City, Philippines
Uzbekistan	September 20, 2005	3–0	25–16	25–21	25–17			75–54	2005 Asian Championship	Suphan Buri, Thailand
Hong Kong	September 21, 2005	3–1	25–19	25–19	24–26	25–14		99–78	2005 Asian Championship	Suphan Buri, Thailand
Australia	September 22, 2005	0–3	12–25	16–25	13–25			41–75	2005 Asian Championship	Suphan Buri, Thailand
Vietnam	September 23, 2005	0–3	20–25	20–25	22–25			62–75	2005 Asian Championship	Suphan Buri, Thailand
Indonesia	September 24, 2005	1–3	12–25	20–25	25–20	14–25		71–95	2005 Asian Championship	Suphan Buri, Thailand
New Zealand	September 25, 2005	3–1	16–25	25–23	25–18	26–24		92–90	2005 Asian Championship	Suphan Buri, Thailand
Chinese Taipei	September 26, 2005	2–3	20–25	25–23	17–25	27–25	14–16	103–114	2005 Asian Championship	Suphan Buri, Thailand
Myanmar	November 27, 2005	0–3	16–25	18–25	27–29			61–79	2005 Southeast Asian Games	Bacolod, Philippines
Vietnam	November 29, 2005	0–3	11–25	17–25	15–25			43–75	2005 Southeast Asian Games	Bacolod, Philippines
Thailand	December 1, 2005	1–3	11–25	25–23	18–25	15–25		69–98	2005 Southeast Asian Games	Bacolod, Philippines
Indonesia	December 3, 2005	2–3	28–26	25–17	22–25	22–25	13–15	110–108	2005 Southeast Asian Games	Bacolod, Philippines

=== 2009 ===
Opponent	Date	Result	Set						Event	Location
Opponent	Date	Result	1	2	3	4	5	Total	Event	Location
Myanmar	September 27, 2009	2–3	25–21	21–25	25–19	22–25	15–17	108–107	2009 Asian Championship	Manila, Philippines
Kazakhstan	September 29, 2005	0–3	19–25	14–25	18–25			51–75	2009 Asian Championship	Manila, Philippines
Chinese Taipei	October 1, 2009	1–3	25–22	19–25	19–25	18–25		81–97	2009 Asian Championship	Manila, Philippines
Vietnam	October 2, 2005	0–3	16–25	20–25	18–25			54–75	2009 Asian Championship	Manila, Philippines
Sri Lanka	October 3, 2005	0–3	23–25	24–26	26–28			73–79	2009 Asian Championship	Manila, Philippines
Thailand	October 4, 2005	0–3	18–25	25–27	18–25			63–79	2009 Asian Championship	Manila, Philippines
Sri Lanka^{[4]}	October 5, 2005	3–0	25–0	25–0	25–0			75–0	2009 Asian Championship	Manila, Philippines

== 2010s ==
=== 2015 ===
Opponent	Date	Result	Set						Event	Location
Opponent	Date	Result	1	2	3	4	5	Total	Event	Location
Malaysia	June 10, 2015	3–1	20–25	25–23	25–18	25–19		95–85	2015 Southeast Asian Games	Kallang, Singapore
Myanmar	June 11, 2015	0–3	16–25	14–25	31–33			61–83	2015 Southeast Asian Games	Kallang, Singapore
Thailand	June 14, 2015	0–3	21–25	16–25	13–25			50–75	2015 Southeast Asian Games	Kallang, Singapore

=== 2017 ===
Opponent	Date	Result	Set						Event	Location
Opponent	Date	Result	1	2	3	4	5	Total	Event	Location
Vietnam	August 21, 2017	0–3	19–25	21–25	20–25			60–75	2017 Southeast Asian Games	Kuala Lumpur, Malaysia
Indonesia	August 23, 2017	1–3	21–25	25–23	33–35	21–25		100–108	2017 Southeast Asian Games	Kuala Lumpur, Malaysia
Timor-Leste	August 24, 2017	3–0	25–13	25–18	25–11			75–42	2017 Southeast Asian Games	Kuala Lumpur, Malaysia

=== 2019 ===
Opponent	Date	Result	Set						WR Pts.^{[5]}	Event	Location
Opponent	Date	Result	1	2	3	4	5	Total	WR Pts.^{[5]}	Event	Location
Cambodia	December 2, 2019	3–0	29–27	25–18	25–11			79–61	—N/a	2019 Southeast Asian Games	Pasig, Philippines
Vietnam	December 3, 2019	3–0	25–20	25–21	25–12			75–53	—N/a	2019 Southeast Asian Games	Pasig, Philippines
Indonesia	December 4, 2019	0–3	23–25	30–32	20–25			73–82	—N/a	2019 Southeast Asian Games	Pasig, Philippines
Thailand	December 8, 2019	3–2	17–25	25–20	23–25	27–25	17–15	109–110	—N/a	2019 Southeast Asian Games	Pasig, Philippines
Indonesia	December 10, 2019	0–3	21–25	25–27	17–25			63–77	—N/a	2019 Southeast Asian Games	Pasig, Philippines

== 2020s ==
=== 2022 ===
Opponent	Date	Result	Set						WR Pts.^{[5]}	Event	Location
Opponent	Date	Result	1	2	3	4	5	Total	WR Pts.^{[5]}	Event	Location
Cambodia	May 14, 2022	1–3	21–25	26–24	28–30	27–29		102–108	—N/a	2021 Southeast Asian Games	Quảng Ninh, Vietnam
Thailand	May 16, 2022	0–3	20–25	27–29	22–25			69–79	—N/a	2021 Southeast Asian Games	Quảng Ninh, Vietnam
Malaysia	May 19, 2022	3–0	25–12	25–13	25–12			75–37	—N/a	2021 Southeast Asian Games	Quảng Ninh, Vietnam
Myanmar	May 19, 2022	3–2	26–24	22–25	25–22	27–29	16–14	116–114	—N/a	2021 Southeast Asian Games	Quảng Ninh, Vietnam

=== 2023 ===
Opponent	Date	Result	Set						WR Pts.^{[5]}	Event	Location
Opponent	Date	Result	1	2	3	4	5	Total	WR Pts.^{[5]}	Event	Location
Indonesia	May 3, 2023	0–3	18–25	18–25	23–25			62–75	—N/a	2023 Southeast Asian Games	Phnom Penh, Cambodia
Cambodia	May 4, 2023	0–3	18–25	18–25	17–25			53–75	—N/a	2023 Southeast Asian Games	Phnom Penh, Cambodia
Singapore	May 6, 2023	0–3	23–25	21–25	18–25			62–75	—N/a	2023 Southeast Asian Games	Phnom Penh, Cambodia
Malaysia	May 7, 2023	3–2	25–19	20–25	25–21	24–26	17–15	111–106	—N/a	2023 Southeast Asian Games	Phnom Penh, Cambodia
Singapore	May 8, 2023	3–1	25–23	23–25	25–22	25–23		98–93	—N/a	2023 Southeast Asian Games	Phnom Penh, Cambodia
Macau	July 9, 2023	3–0	25–21	25–15	25–14			75–50	+2.56	2023 AVC Challenge Cup	Taipei, Taiwan
Mongolia	July 10, 2023	3–2	22–25	25–11	26–24	23–25	15–12	111–107	+1.25	2023 AVC Challenge Cup	Taipei, Taiwan
Bahrain	July 12, 2023	0–3	20–25	17–25	23–25			60–75	-2.90	2023 AVC Challenge Cup	Taipei, Taiwan
Macau	July 13, 2023	3–0	25–15	25–16	25–17			75–48	+2.49	2023 AVC Challenge Cup	Taipei, Taiwan
Mongolia	July 14, 2023	2–3	25–17	25–23	23–25	22–25	12–15	107–105	-1.30	2023 AVC Challenge Cup	Taipei, Taiwan
Chinese Taipei	July 15, 2023	1–3	22–25	17–25	28–26	22–25		89–101	-1.40	2023 AVC Challenge Cup	Taipei, Taiwan
Indonesia	July 21, 2023	0–3	20–25	22–25	19–25			61–75	—N/a	2023 SEA V.League – First Leg	Bogor, Indonesia
Thailand	July 22, 2023	0–3	22–25	20–25	20–25			57–78	—N/a	2023 SEA V.League – First Leg	Bogor, Indonesia
Vietnam	July 23, 2023	2–3	25–22	25–21	18–25	23–25	10–15	101–108	—N/a	2023 SEA V.League – First Leg	Bogor, Indonesia
Thailand	July 28, 2023	2–3	24–26	27–25	25–21	23–25	15–17	114–114	—N/a	2023 SEA V.League – Second Leg	Santa Rosa, Philippines
Indonesia	July 29, 2023	0–3	20–25	22–25	20–25			62–75	—N/a	2023 SEA V.League – Second Leg	Santa Rosa, Philippines
Vietnam	July 30, 2023	2–3	25–22	18–25	20–25	26–24	8–15	97–111	—N/a	2023 SEA V.League – Second Leg	Santa Rosa, Philippines

=== 2024 ===
Opponent	Date	Result	Set						WR Pts.^{[5]}	Event	Location
Opponent	Date	Result	1	2	3	4	5	Total	WR Pts.^{[5]}	Event	Location
China	June 2, 2024	0–3	19–25	22–25	22–25			63–75	-1.50	2024 AVC Challenge Cup	Isa Town, Bahrain
Bahrain	June 3, 2024	0–3	18–25	23–25	20–25			61–75	-2.63	2024 AVC Challenge Cup	Isa Town, Bahrain
Indonesia	June 5, 2024	3–1	25–23	23–25	25–14	25–22		98–84	+2.04	2024 AVC Challenge Cup	Isa Town, Bahrain
Thailand	June 7, 2024	1–3	20–25	25–23	22–25	20–25		87–98	-1.93	2024 AVC Challenge Cup	Isa Town, Bahrain
Vietnam	August 16, 2024	3–1	25–21	25–22	18–25	25–23		93–91	—N/a	2024 SEA V.League – First Leg	Manila, Philippines
Indonesia	August 17, 2024	1–3	25–23	19–25	11–25	21–25		76–98	—N/a	2024 SEA V.League – First Leg	Manila, Philippines
Thailand	August 18, 2024	0–3	26–28	15–25	16–25			57–78	—N/a	2024 SEA V.League – First Leg	Manila, Philippines
Indonesia	August 23, 2024	0–3	24–26	11–25	15–25			50–76	—N/a	2024 SEA V.League – Second Leg	Yogyakarta, Indonesia
Thailand	August 24, 2024	0–3	18–25	21–25	19–25			58–75	—N/a	2024 SEA V.League – Second Leg	Yogyakarta, Indonesia
Vietnam	August 25, 2024	3–2	25–27	14–25	22–25	25–21	15–11	103–107	—N/a	2024 SEA V.League – Second Leg	Yogyakarta, Indonesia

=== 2025 ===
Opponent	Date	Result	Set						WR Pts.^{[5]}	Event	Location
Opponent	Date	Result	1	2	3	4	5	Total	WR Pts.^{[5]}	Event	Location
Pakistan	June 17, 2025	1–3	18–25	12–25	25–18	22–25		77–93	-4.38	2025 AVC Nations Cup	Manama, Bahrain
Chinese Taipei	June 18, 2025	1–3	19–25	25–23	28–30	20–25		92–103	-4.02	2025 AVC Nations Cup	Manama, Bahrain
Thailand	June 20, 2025	0–3	21–25	20–25	18–25			59–75	-7.53	2025 AVC Nations Cup	Manama, Bahrain
New Zealand	June 24, 2025	3–1	25–16	23–25	25–11	25–22		98–74	+6.04	2025 AVC Nations Cup	Manama, Bahrain
Vietnam	July 9, 2025	3–0	25–17	25–23	25–19			75–59	+8.15	2025 SEA V.League – First Leg^{[6]}	Candon, Philippines
Thailand	July 10, 2025	0–3	16–25	22–25	24–26			62–76	-6.94	2025 SEA V.League – First Leg^{[6]}	Candon, Philippines
Cambodia	July 12, 2025	3–2	25–21	25–27	32–30	23–25	15–8	120–111	+3.62	2025 SEA V.League – First Leg^{[6]}	Candon, Philippines
Indonesia	July 13, 2025	0–3	19–25	17–25	17–25			53–75	-6.95	2025 SEA V.League – First Leg^{[6]}	Candon, Philippines
Indonesia	July 16, 2025	2–3	19–25	25–19	25–21	22–25	8–15	99–105	-2.62	2025 SEA V.League – Second Leg	Jakarta, Indonesia
Cambodia	July 18, 2025	3–1	25–23	25–22	23–25	25–18		98–88	+4.91	2025 SEA V.League – Second Leg	Jakarta, Indonesia
Thailand	July 19, 2025	2–3	25–18	25–18	14–25	23–25	7–15	94–101	-2.59	2025 SEA V.League – Second Leg	Jakarta, Indonesia
Vietnam	July 20, 2025	1–3	23–25	25–21	17–25	16–25		81–96	-4.59	2025 SEA V.League – Second Leg	Jakarta, Indonesia
Tunisia	September 12, 2025	0–3	13–25	17–25	23–25			53–75	-8.1	2025 FIVB World Championship	Pasay, Philippines
Egypt	September 16, 2025	3–1	29–27	23–25	25–21	25–21		102–94	+18.14	2025 FIVB World Championship	Pasay, Philippines
Iran	September 18, 2025	2–3	25–21	21–25	25–17	23–25	20–22	114–110	-0.01	2025 FIVB World Championship	Pasay, Philippines
Myanmar	December 13, 2025	3–0	25–23	25–20	25–21			75–64	—N/a	2025 Southeast Asian Games	Bangkok, Thailand
Indonesia	December 16, 2025	0–3	17–25	25–27	24–26			66–78	—N/a	2025 Southeast Asian Games	Bangkok, Thailand
Thailand	December 18, 2025	0–3	20–25	19–25	21–25			60–75	—N/a	2025 Southeast Asian Games	Bangkok, Thailand
Vietnam	December 19, 2025	3–2	23–25	23–25	25–18	25–22	16–14	112–104	—N/a	2025 Southeast Asian Games	Bangkok, Thailand

=== 2026 ===
Opponent	Date	Result	Set						WR Pts.^{[5]}	Event	Location
Opponent	Date	Result	1	2	3	4	5	Total	WR Pts.^{[5]}	Event	Location
Cambodia	July 15, 2026	2–3	23–25	30–28	20–25	25–22	8–15	106–115	—N/a	2026 SEA V Cup – First Leg	Candon, Philippines
Indonesia	July 17, 2026	0–3	20–25	23–25	25–27			68–77	—N/a	2026 SEA V Cup – First Leg	Candon, Philippines
Myanmar	July 18, 2026	3–0	25–21	28–26	25–22			78–69	—N/a	2026 SEA V Cup – First Leg	Candon, Philippines
Cambodia	July 23, 2026	0–3	20–25	21–25	24–26			65–76	-6.03	2026 SEA V Cup – Second Leg	Jakarta, Indonesia
Indonesia	July 24, 2026	1–3	18–25	17–25	25–23	19–25		79–98	-1.86	2026 SEA V Cup – Second Leg	Jakarta, Indonesia
Myanmar	July 25, 2026	3–0	28–26	25–17	25–23			78–66	+5.43	2026 SEA V Cup – Second Leg	Jakarta, Indonesia
South Korea	September 27, 2026	0–3	16–25	25–27	22–25			63–77	—N/a	2026 Asian Games	Aichi, Japan
China	September 28, 2026	0–3	21–25	20–25	22–25			63–75	—N/a	2026 Asian Games	Aichi, Japan
Chinese Taipei	September 29, 2026	1–3	25–21	20–25	17–25	27–29		89–100	—N/a	2026 Asian Games	Aichi, Japan
Indonesia	October 1, 2029	1–3	23–25	26–24	22–25	21–25		92–99	—N/a	2026 Asian Games	Aichi, Japan
Uzbekistan	October 2, 2026	3–1	25–19	25–15	23–25	25–17		98–76	—N/a	2026 Asian Games	Aichi, Japan
Kyrgyzstan	October 3, 2026	3–0	25–0	25–0	25–0			75–0	—N/a	2026 Asian Games	Aichi, Japan

== Invitational tournaments and exhibition games results ==
Opponent	Date	Result	Set						Event	Location
Opponent	Date	Result	1	2	3	4	5	Total	Event	Location
South Korea U19	July 24, 2017	2–3	26–24	17–25	22–25	25–22	11–15		Exhibition game	Suwon, South Korea
South Korea Universiade	July 25, 2017	0–4	16–25	20–25	19–25	25–27		80–102	Exhibition game	Suwon, South Korea
South Korea U19	July 26, 2017	0–5	14–25	16–25	23–25	25–27	13–15		Exhibition game	Suwon, South Korea
(South Korea) Hwasung City	July 27, 2017	1–5	20–25	25–17	19–25	14–25	16–25		Exhibition game	Suwon, South Korea
(Thailand) Air Force Men's Volleyball Club	July 5, 2019	0–3	20–25	18–25	21–25			59–75	2019 Sealect Tuna Men's Senior Volleyball Kor Royal Cup	Sisaket, Thailand
(Thailand) Fine Chef Phitsanulok	July 6, 2019	3–1	17–25	25–12	25–22	25–20		92–79	2019 Sealect Tuna Men's Senior Volleyball Kor Royal Cup	Sisaket, Thailand
(Thailand) Royal Thai Army	July 8, 2019	1–3	19–25	21–25	25–19	19–25		84–94	2019 Sealect Tuna Men's Senior Volleyball Kor Royal Cup	Sisaket, Thailand
(Thailand) Thai-Denmark Saraburi	July 9, 2019	3–2	22–25	27–29	25–18	25–18	26–24	125–114	2019 Sealect Tuna Men's Senior Volleyball Kor Royal Cup	Sisaket, Thailand
(Japan) Saitama Azalea	November 7, 2019	0–3	20–25	23–25	23–25			66–75	Exhibition game	Tokyo, Japan
(Japan) Fujitsu Red Spirits	November 9, 2019	1–4	22–25	21–25	24–26	20–25	25–23	112–124	Exhibition game	Kawasaki, Japan
(Japan) FC Tokyo	November 12, 2019	1–3	22–25	15–25	25–21	18–25		80–96	Exhibition game	Fukugawa, Japan
(Japan) FC Tokyo	November 14, 2019	0–4	21–25	12–25	20–25	15–25		68–100	Exhibition game	Fukugawa, Japan
(Japan) Osaka Bluteon	September 7, 2024	0–3	27–29	23–25	12-25			62–79	Alas Pilipinas Invitationals (Exhibition game)	Pasig, Philippines
(Japan) Osaka Bluteon	September 8, 2024	0–3	17–25	10–25	21–25			48–75	Alas Pilipinas Invitationals (Exhibition game)	Pasig, Philippines
(United States) Fil-Am Nation Select	June 1, 2025	3–0	25–21	25–21	25–18			75–60	Serve-Spike Unite! 2 (Exhibition game)	New York City, U.S.
(Indonesia) Jakarta Bhayangkara Presisi	June 10, 2025	3–0	25–23	27–29	25–21	25–22		102–95	Alas Pilipinas Invitationals (Invitational tournament)	Quezon City, Philippines
(South Korea) Hyundai Capital Skywalkers	June 11, 2025	3–1	25–22	22–25	25–21	25–20		97–88	Alas Pilipinas Invitationals (Invitational tournament)	Quezon City, Philippines
Thailand	June 11, 2025	3–2	21–25	25–21	25–22	21–25	15–12	107–105	Alas Pilipinas Invitationals (Invitational tournament)	Quezon City, Philippines
Romania	August 14, 2025	1–3							Exhibition game	Piatra Neamț, Romania
Romania	August 15, 2025	1–3							Exhibition game	Piatra Neamț, Romania
Romania	August 16, 2025	1–3							Exhibition game	Piatra Neamț, Romania
Portugal	August 19, 2025	0–3	17–25	26–28	17–25				Exhibition game	Santo Tirso, Portugal
Portugal	August 20, 2025	0–3	20–25	21–24	22–25				Exhibition game	Santo Tirso, Portugal
Portugal	August 22, 2025	0–3	15–25	26–28	23–25				Exhibition game	Santo Tirso, Portugal

== See also ==
- Philippines women's national volleyball team results and fixtures
- Philippines national volleyball teams in FIVB club tournaments

== Notes ==
^[1] These are separate events from the traditional 6-man volleyball. Only two editions of the Men's Nine-a-side volleyball event were at the Asian Games.
^[2] Thailand won over the Philippines via walkover.
^[3] The Philippines won over Pakistan via walkover.
^[4] The Philippines won over Sri Lanka via forfeiture.
^[5] The new calculation method of the FIVB Senior World Rankings was implemented on February 1, 2020 where every match results in any annual FIVB-sanctioned event from January 1, 2019 is taken into account of a country's rating in the World Rankings.
^[6] Starting in 2025, the new FIVB Senior World Rankings calculation now includes annual zonal events held in any confederation. Hence, the SEA V.League is now a sanctioned event where Southeast Asian countries can garner world ranking points.
